= 2018 Karnataka Legislative Assembly election =

Indian state election

- 12 May 2018 (Note: Elections in the constituencies of Rajarajeshwarinagar and Jayanagar were postponed to 28 May 2018 and 11 June 2018 respectively.)

All 224 seats in the Karnataka Legislative Assembly 113 seats needed for a majority
- Opinion polls
- Registered: 50,718,198
- Turnout: 72.50% (▲0.67 pp)
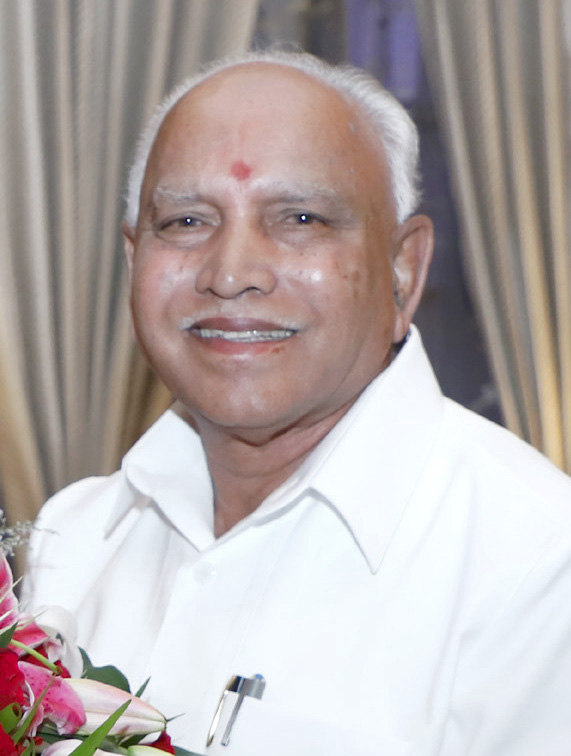

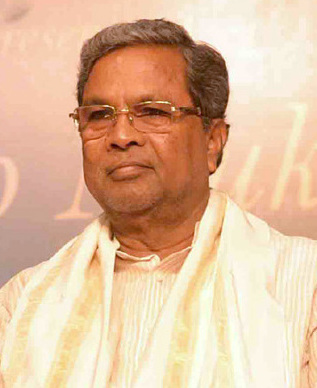

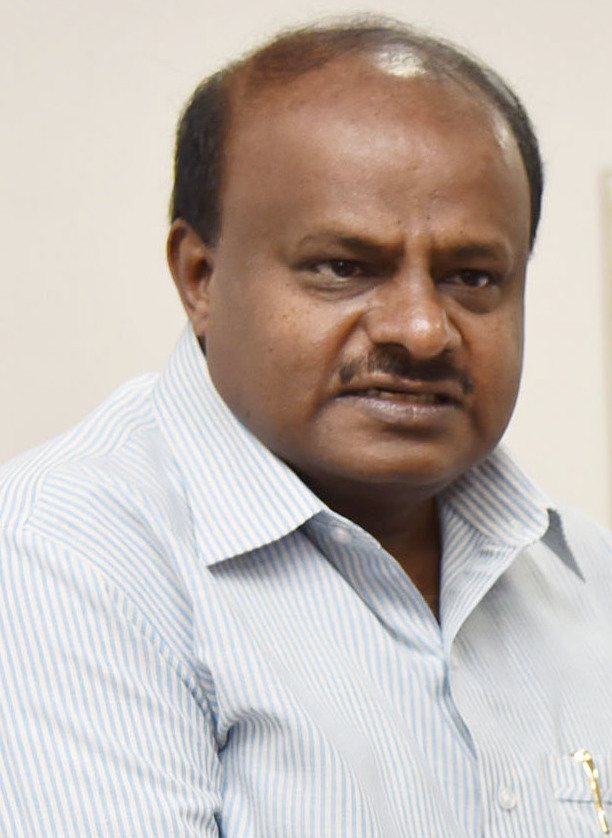
	Majority party	Minority party	Third party
Leader	B. S. Yediyurappa	Siddaramaiah	H. D. Kumaraswamy
Party	BJP	INC	JD(S)
Alliance			JD(S)+
Leader since	2018	2018	2006
Leader's seat	Shikaripura (won)	Badami (won); Chamundeshwari (lost)	Channapatna (won; retained); Ramanagara (won; vacated)
Last election	19.89%, 40 seats	36.59%, 122 seats	20.19%, 40 seats
Seats won	104	80	37
Seat change	▲64	▼42	▼3
Popular vote	13,267,956	13,986,526	6,726,667
Percentage	36.35%	38.14%	18.3%
Swing	▲16.3 pp	▲1.4 pp	▼1.9 pp

- Structure of the Karnataka Legislative Assembly after the election
Chief Minister before election
Siddaramaiah
INC
Elected Chief Minister
H. D. Kumaraswamy
JD(S)

The 2018 Karnataka Legislative Assembly election was held on 12 May 2018 in 222 constituencies to the Karnataka Legislative Assembly. The election was postponed in Jayanagar and Rajarajeshwari Nagar, following the death of the MLA B. N. Vijaya Kumar and a voter fraud scandal respectively, until 28 May. The election saw a voter turnout of 72.13 per cent, the highest in Karnataka for several decades. The counting of votes took place on 15 May 2018.

The Indian National Congress (INC) was seeking re-election, having governed the state since elections in 2013. The Bharatiya Janata Party attempted to regain office, having previously governed the state in 2007 and from 2008 to 2013. The Janata Dal (Secular), and the Bahujan Samaj Party (BSP) contested the election in an electoral alliance. The Aam Aadmi Party also made its debut in the state.

== Background ==
The tenure of the 15th Karnataka Assembly ended on 28 May 2018.

=== Organization ===
The Times of India reported in late February 2018 that the state had fewer electronic voting machines than the minimum mandated requirement to be stored going into elections for any state assembly. The report stated that only 20 percent or 11,399 EVMs were in place against the requirement of 56,994 machines, one each for a polling station. Bharat Electronics Limited, which provides 80 percent of the machines, began supplying during this time. The district election officer for the Bangalore region stated that a "vulnerability mapping exercise" would be conducted to ensure "free and fair polls". He added that 550 sector teams, each headed by a sector magistrate, a police officer (not below the rank of an assistant sub-inspector) and a videographer, were formed, one for every 15 of the 8,274 polling stations in the said region.

Voter-verified paper audit trail (VVPAT) machines were used with EVMs in all polling stations in Karnataka.

== Schedule ==
The schedule of the election was announced by the Election Commission of India on 27 March 2018. It announced that polling would be held in a single phase on 12 May and that results would be declared on 15 May. It also declared that the provisions of the Model Code of Conduct "came into force with immediate effect" with the said announcement.

Event	Date	Day
Date for nominations	17 April 2018	Tuesday
Last date for filing nominations	24 April 2018	Tuesday
Date for scrutiny of nominations	25 April 2018	Wednesday
Last date for withdrawal of candidatures	27 April 2018	Friday
Date of poll	12 May 2018	Saturday
Date of counting	15 May 2018	Tuesday
Date before which the election shall be completed	31 May 2018	Thursday

=== Controversies ===
==== Leaked election dates ====
The Election Commission of India ran into a major embarrassment on 27 March 2018, when BJP IT cell head Amit Malviya and the Karnataka Congress' social media in-charge, Srivasta, tweeted the dates before they were officially released. However, both of them got the counting day incorrect in their tweets. Both the tweets were deleted after outrage on Twitter. Malviya later claimed that he got the information from Times Now, a 24-hour English news channel. The news was reportedly also shown by a local Kannada news channel. Later it was revealed that even Times Now got the counting day incorrectly as 18 May 2018, instead of 15 May 2018.

Om Prakash Rawat, the Chief Election Commissioner of India, formed a committee to investigate the alleged leak. The terms of reference of the formed committee included probing certain media outlets and Congress' social media head Srivasta, but not BJP's Amit Malviya. This prompted allegations of the Election Commission of India being biased for the BJP by the Congress.

On 14 April 2018, the committee said that the media reports were mere speculation and not a leak.

==== Voter ID fraud case ====
On 11 May 2018, Congress MLA Munirathna and 13 others were booked in an alleged fake voter ID scam. On 8 May, almost 10,000 voter ID cards, along with several laptops, were found in a flat in Bengaluru owned by former BJP leader Manjula Nanjamari. Apart from these, Munirathna's pamphlets were also found, which turned the suspicion on Munirathna. After the FIR, he said "I've distributed 40,000 pamphlets asking for votes for me in my constituency and you will find them in every home in my segment. I've been named as accused no. 14 because one such pamphlet was found in the flat that was raided. This is an outrageous complaint against me and part of the concerted propaganda to harass and humiliate me."

The polling in RR Nagar was postponed to 28 May and the counting of votes was done on 31 May.

==== Kaveri river water scandal ====
The Karnataka Legislative Assembly election sparked criticisms from Tamil Nadu over the Karnataka's government for not addressing the issue on properly and for its delay in setting up a Kaveri Management Board. The Supreme Court also issued a strict notice to the Karnataka state government for using the Karnataka Legislative state election as an excuse to resolve the Kaveri river water crisis with Tamil Nadu cannot be acceptable. The election was one of the hottest points considered by the critics for the future of Karnataka in dealing with the rivals, Tamil Nadu over the Kaveri River water dispute.

== Parties and alliances ==
=== United Progressive Alliance ===
Party	Flag	Symbol	Leader	Contesting seats
Indian National Congress			Siddaramaiah	222

=== National Democratic Alliance ===
Party	Flag	Symbol	Leader	Contesting seats
Bharatiya Janata Party			B. S. Yediyurappa	222

=== JD(S)+ ===
Party	Flag	Symbol	Leader	Contesting seats
Janata Dal (Secular)			H. D. Kumaraswamy	199
Bahujan Samaj Party			Mayawati	18

== List of candidates ==
District	#	Constituency	BJP		INC		JD(S) + BSP	
District	#	Constituency	Party	Candidate	Party	Candidate	Party	Candidate
Belagavi	1	Nippani	BJP	Shashikala Jolle	INC	Kakaso P. Patil	BSP	Ramesh Kamat
Belagavi	2	Chikkodi-Sadalga	BJP	Annasaheb Jolle	INC	Ganesh Hukkeri	BSP	Maruti S. Walke
Belagavi	3	Athani	BJP	Laxman Savadi	INC	Mahesh Kumathalli	JD(S)	Girish K. Butali
Belagavi	4	Kagwad	BJP	Bharamgouda Kage	INC	Shrimant Patil	JD(S)	Kallappa P. Magennavar
Belagavi	5	Kudachi (SC)	BJP	P. Rajeev	INC	Amit Ghatage	JD(S)	Rajendra Aihole
Belagavi	6	Raybag (SC)	BJP	Duryodhan Aihole	INC	Pradeepkumar R. Malagi	BSP	Rajeev Kamble
Belagavi	7	Hukkeri	BJP	Umesh Katti	INC	Appayyagouda B. Patil	JD(S)	Mallikarjun B. Patil
Belagavi	8	Arabhavi	BJP	Balachandra Jarkiholi	INC	Arvind M. Dalwai	JD(S)	Bhimappa Gadad
Belagavi	9	Gokak	BJP	Ashok N. Pujari	INC	Ramesh Jarkiholi	JD(S)	Lakkappa Talawar
Belagavi	10	Yemkanmardi (ST)	BJP	Astagi Maruti Mallappa	INC	Satish Jarkiholi	JD(S)	Shankar Bharama Gasti
Belagavi	11	Belgaum Uttar	BJP	Anil S. Benake	INC	Fairoz Nuruddin Saith	JD(S)	Ashfaq Ahmed Madaki
Belagavi	12	Belgaum Dakshin	BJP	Abhay Patil	INC	M. D. Lakshminarayana	JD(S)	Changadev Kugaji
Belagavi	13	Belgaum Rural	BJP	Sanjay Patil	INC	Lakshmi Hebbalkar	JD(S)	S. Patil Shivanagouda
Belagavi	14	Khanapur	BJP	Vithal Halagekar	INC	Anjali Nimbalkar	JD(S)	Bagwan Nasir Papulsab
Belagavi	15	Kittur	BJP	Mahantesh Doddagoudar	INC	D. B. Inamdar	JD(S)	Suresh S. Marihal
Belagavi	16	Bailhongal	BJP	Vishwanath Patil	INC	Mahantesh Koujalagi	JD(S)	Shankar B. Madalagi
Belagavi	17	Saundatti Yellamma	BJP	Anand Mamani	INC	Vishwas Vaidya	JD(S)	Doddagouda F. Patil
Belagavi	18	Ramdurg	BJP	Mahadevappa Yadawad	INC	Ashok Pattan	JD(S)	M. Javeedsab
Bagalkot	19	Mudhol (SC)	BJP	Govind Karjol	INC	Satish Bandiwaddar	JD(S)	Shankar N. Nayak
Bagalkot	20	Terdal	BJP	Siddu Savadi	INC	Umashree	JD(S)	Basappa K. Konnur
Bagalkot	21	Jamkhandi	BJP	Shrikant Kulkarni	INC	Siddu Nyamagouda	JD(S)	Sadashiv Kalal
Bagalkot	22	Bilgi	BJP	Murugesh Nirani	INC	J. T. Patil	JD(S)	Sangappa T. Kandagal
Bagalkot	23	Badami	BJP	B. Sriramulu	INC	Siddaramaiah	JD(S)	Hanamant Mavinamarad
Bagalkot	24	Bagalkot	BJP	V. Charantimath	INC	H. Y. Meti	BSP	Mohan M. Jigalur
Bagalkot	25	Hungund	BJP	Doddanagouda G. Patil	INC	Vijayanand Kashappanavar		
Vijayapura	26	Muddebihal	BJP	A. S. Patil	INC	C. S. Nadagouda	JD(S)	Mangaladevi Biradar
Vijayapura	27	Devar Hippargi	BJP	Somanagouda B. Patil	INC	B. S. Patil	JD(S)	Bhimanagouda Patil
Vijayapura	28	Basavana Bagevadi	BJP	Sangaraj Desai	INC	Shivanand Patil	JD(S)	Somanagouda Patil
Vijayapura	29	Babaleshwar	BJP	Vijayakumar S. Patil	INC	M. B. Patil		
Vijayapura	30	Bijapur City	BJP	Yatnal	INC	Abdul Hameed Mushrif	JD(S)	Bellubbi S. Kallappa
Vijayapura	31	Nagthan (SC)	BJP	Govind Karjol	INC	Katakadond Dondiba	JD(S)	Devanand F. Chavan
Vijayapura	32	Indi	BJP	Dayasagar B. Patil	INC	Yashavant Patil	JD(S)	B. D. Patil
Vijayapura	33	Sindgi	BJP	Bhusanur Ramesh Balappa	INC	Sali Mallanna Ningappa	JD(S)	M. C. Managuli
Kalaburagi	34	Afzalpur	BJP	Malikayya Guttedar	INC	M. Y. Patil	JD(S)	Raju Gouda Revoor
Kalaburagi	35	Jevargi	BJP	Doddappagowda S. Patil	INC	Ajay Singh	JD(S)	Kedarlingayya Hiremath
Yadgir	36	Shorapur (ST)	BJP	Narasimha Nayak	INC	Raja Venkatappa Naik	JD(S)	Raja Krishnappa Nayak
Yadgir	37	Shahapur	BJP	Guru Patil Sirwal	INC	S. Darshanapur	JD(S)	Ameenraddi Yalagi
Yadgir	38	Yadgir	BJP	Venkatreddy Mudnal	INC	A. B. Maalakaraddy	JD(S)	A. C. Kadloor
Yadgir	39	Gurmitkal	BJP	Sayibanna	INC	Baburao Chinchansur	JD(S)	Naganagouda Kandkur
Kalaburagi	40	Chittapur (SC)	BJP	Valmiki Nayak	INC	Priyank Kharge	BSP	V. K. Devaraja
Kalaburagi	41	Sedam	BJP	Rajkumar Patil	INC	Sharan Prakash Patil	JD(S)	Sunita Malkhed
Kalaburagi	42	Chincholi (SC)	BJP	Sunil Vallyapure	INC	Umesh. G. Jadhav	JD(S)	Sushilabai B. Korvi
Kalaburagi	43	Gulbarga Rural (SC)	BJP	Basawaraj Mattimud	INC	Vijaykumar G. Ramakrishna	JD(S)	Revu Naik Belamgi
Kalaburagi	44	Gulbarga Dakshin	BJP	Dattatraya Revoor	INC	Allamprabhu Patil	JD(S)	Basavaraj Diggavi (Note: Friendly Contest between JD(S) and BSP in Gulbarga Dakshin–44)
Kalaburagi	44	Gulbarga Dakshin	BJP	Dattatraya Revoor	INC	Allamprabhu Patil	BSP	Suryakant Nimbalkar
Kalaburagi	45	Gulbarga Uttar	BJP	Chandrakant B. Patil	INC	Kaneez Fatima	JD(S)	Nasir Hussain Ustad
Kalaburagi	46	Aland	BJP	Subhash Guttedar	INC	B. R. Patil	JD(S)	Suryakant K. Koralli
Bidar	47	Basavakalyan	BJP	Mallikarjun Khuba	INC	B. Narayanrao	JD(S)	P. G. R. Sindhia
Bidar	48	Humnabad	BJP	Subhash	INC	Rajashekar Patil	JD(S)	M. Naseemoddin Patel
Bidar	49	Bidar South	BJP	Shailendra Beldale	INC	Ashok Kheny	JD(S)	Bandeppa Kashempur
Bidar	50	Bidar	BJP	Surayakanth Nagmarpalli	INC	Rahim Khan	BSP	M. Muniyappa
Bidar	51	Bhalki	BJP	D. K. Sidram	INC	Eshwara Khandre	JD(S)	Prakash Khandre
Bidar	52	Aurad (SC)	BJP	Prabhu Chauhan	INC	Vijaykumar	JD(S)	Dhanaji
Raichur	53	Raichur Rural (ST)	BJP	Tipparaju Hawaldar	INC	Basanagouda Daddal	JD(S)	Ravi Kumar Patil
Raichur	54	Raichur	BJP	S. Shivaraj Patil	INC	Syed Yaseen	JD(S)	Mahantesh Patil
Raichur	55	Manvi (ST)	BJP	Sharanappa K. Gudadinni	INC	G. Hampayya Nayak	JD(S)	Raja Venkatappa Naik
Raichur	56	Devadurga (ST)	BJP	K. Shivanagouda Naik	INC	A. Rajashekar Nayak	JD(S)	Arkera Venkatesh Pujari
Raichur	57	Lingsugur (SC)	BJP	Manappa D. Vajjal	INC	D. S. Hoolageri	JD(S)	Bandi Siddu
Raichur	58	Sindhanur	BJP	Kolla Sheshagirirao	INC	Hampanagouda Badarli	JD(S)	Venkatrao Nadagouda
Raichur	59	Maski (ST)	BJP	Basanagouda Turvihal	INC	Pratapagouda Patil	JD(S)	Rajasomanath Nayak
Koppal	60	Kushtagi	BJP	Doddanagouda Patil	INC	Amaregouda L. Patil	JD(S)	H. C. Neeravari
Koppal	61	Kanakagiri (SC)	BJP	Basavaraj Dadesugur	INC	Shivaraj Tangadagi	JD(S)	Manjula Ravikumar
Koppal	62	Gangawati	BJP	Paranna Munavalli	INC	Iqbal Ansari	JD(S)	Kariyanna Sangati
Koppal	63	Yelburga	BJP	Achar Halappa Basappa	INC	Basavaraj Rayareddi	JD(S)	Veeranagouda Ballutagi
Koppal	64	Koppal	BJP	K. S. Amarappa	INC	K. Raghavendra Hitnal	JD(S)	K. M. Syed
Gadag	65	Shirahatti (SC)	BJP	Ramappa S. Lamani	INC	Ramakrishna Shidlingappa	BSP	Chandrakanth S. Kadrolli
Gadag	66	Gadag	BJP	Anil Mensinakai	INC	H. K. Patil	BSP	Mahaboobsab R. Sompur
Gadag	67	Ron	BJP	Kalakappa Bandi	INC	Gurupadagouda Patil	JD(S)	Ravindranath J. Doddameti
Gadag	68	Nargund	BJP	C. C. Patil	INC	B. R. Yavagal	JD(S)	Girimallanagouda Patil
Dharwad	69	Navalgund	BJP	Shankar Munenakoppa	INC	Asuti Vinod Kashinath	JD(S)	N. H. Konaraddi
Dharwad	70	Kundgol	BJP	C. S. Ishwaragod	INC	C. S. Shivalli	JD(S)	S. Akki Mallikarjuna
Dharwad	71	Dharwad	BJP	Amrut Desai	INC	Vinay Kulkarni	JD(S)	Tirakappa S. Jamanal
Dharwad	72	Hubli-Dharwad-East (SC)	BJP	Chandrashekar Gokak	INC	Abbayya Prasad	BSP	Shobha Ballari
Dharwad	73	Hubli-Dharwad Central	BJP	Jagadish Shettar	INC	Mahesh Nalwad	JD(S)	Rajanna M. Koravi
Dharwad	74	Hubli-Dharwad-West	BJP	Arvind Bellad	INC	Md. Ismail Tamatgar		
Dharwad	75	Kalghatgi	BJP	C. M. Nimbannavar	INC	Santosh Lad	JD(S)	Ambadagatti S. Rudrappa
Uttara Kannada	76	Haliyal	BJP	Sunil Hegade	INC	R. V. Deshpande	JD(S)	K. R. Ramesh
Uttara Kannada	77	Karwar	BJP	Roopali Naik	INC	Satish Krishna Sail	JD(S)	Anand Asnotikar
Uttara Kannada	78	Kumta	BJP	Dinakar Shetty	INC	Sharada Shetty	JD(S)	Nayak Pradeep Dayanand
Uttara Kannada	79	Bhatkal	BJP	Sunil Biliya Naik	INC	Mankala Vaidya		
Uttara Kannada	80	Sirsi	BJP	Vishweshwar Kageri	INC	Bhimanna Naik	JD(S)	Shashibhushan Hegde
Uttara Kannada	81	Yellapur	BJP	Andalagi Patil	INC	Arabail Hebbar Shivaram	JD(S)	Naik Ravindra A.
Haveri	82	Hangal	BJP	C. M. Udasi	INC	Srinivas Mane	JD(S)	Bommanahalli Babu
Haveri	83	Shiggaon	BJP	Basavaraj Bommai	INC	Syed A. Khadri	JD(S)	Ashok Bevinamar
Haveri	84	Haveri (SC)	BJP	Neharu Olekar	INC	Rudrappa Lamani	JD(S)	Sanjay Dange
Haveri	85	Byadgi	BJP	Virupakshappa Ballary	INC	S. R. Patil	BSP	S. Bagannanavar
Haveri	86	Hirekerur	BJP	U. B. Banakar	INC	Basavanagouda Patil	JD(S)	Siddappa Gudadappanavar
Haveri	87	Ranibennur	BJP	Basavaraj Kelagar	INC	K. B. Koliwad	JD(S)	Shripad Sawkar
Vijayanagara	88	Hadagalli (SC)	BJP	B. Chandranaik	INC	P. T. Parameshwar Naik	JD(S)	Kayannanavara Putrappa
Vijayanagara	89	Hagaribommanahalli (SC)	BJP	K. Nemiraj Naik	INC	L. B. P. Bheema Naik	JD(S)	S. Krushna Naik
Vijayanagara	90	Vijayanagara	BJP	H. R. Gaviyappa	INC	Anand Singh	JD(S)	Deepak Singh
Ballary	91	Kampli (ST)	BJP	T. H. Suresh Babu	INC	J. N. Ganesh	JD(S)	K. Raghavendra
Ballary	92	Siruguppa (ST)	BJP	M. S. Somalingappa	INC	B. Murali Krishna	JD(S)	Hosamane B. Maruthi
Ballary	93	Bellary (ST)	BJP	Sanna Pakkirappa	INC	B Nagendra	JD(S)	D Ramesh
Ballary	94	Bellary City	BJP	G. Somashekara Reddy	INC	Anil Lad	JD(S)	Mohamad Iqbal Hothur
Ballary	95	Sandur (ST)	BJP	D. Raghavendra	INC	E. Tukaram	JD(S)	B. Vasanth Kumar
Vijayanagara	96	Kudligi (ST)	BJP	N. Y. Gopalakrishna	INC	Raghu Gujjal	JD(S)	N. T. Bommanna
Chitradurga	97	Molakalmuru (ST)	BJP	B. Sriramulu	INC	B. Yogesh Babu	JD(S)	G. M. Thippeswamy Patel
Chitradurga	98	Challakere (ST)	BJP	K. T. Kumaraswamy	INC	T. Raghumurthy	JD(S)	Raveesh Kumar
Chitradurga	99	Chitradurga	BJP	G. H. Thippareddy	INC	H. A. Shanmukhappa	JD(S)	K. C. Veerendra Puppy
Chitradurga	100	Hiriyur	BJP	Poornima Krishnappa	INC	D. Sudhakar	JD(S)	D. Yashodhara
Chitradurga	101	Hosadurga	BJP	Gulihatti D. Shekar	INC	B. G. Govindappa	JD(S)	Shashikumar
Chitradurga	102	Holalkere (SC)	BJP	M. Chandrappa	INC	H. Anjaneya	JD(S)	T. Srinivasa Gaddige
Davanagere	103	Jagalur (ST)	BJP	S. V. Ramachandra	INC	H. P. Rajesh	JD(S)	B. Devendrappa
Vijayanagara	104	Harapanahalli	BJP	G. Karunakara Reddy	INC	M. P. Ravindra	JD(S)	Arasikere N. Kotresh
Davanagere	105	Harihar	BJP	B. P. Harish	INC	S. Ramappa	JD(S)	H. S. Shivashankar
Davanagere	106	Davanagere North	BJP	S. A. Ravindranath	INC	S. S. Mallikarjun	JD(S)	M. Ananda
Davanagere	107	Davanagere South	BJP	Yashavantha Rao Jadhav	INC	Shamanuru	JD(S)	J. Amanulla Khan
Davanagere	108	Mayakonda (SC)	BJP	N. Linganna	INC	K. S. Basavanthappa	JD(S)	Sheela Naik
Davanagere	109	Channagiri	BJP	K. Madalu Virupakshappa	INC	Vadnal Rajanna	JD(S)	D. Ramesha
Davanagere	110	Honnali	BJP	M. P. Renukacharya	INC	D. G. Shanthana Gowda	BSP	Kathari Satyanarayana Rao
Shimoga	111	Shimoga Rural (SC)	BJP	K. B. Ashok Naik	INC	Sreenivas Kariyanna	JD(S)	Sharada Puryanaik
Shimoga	112	Bhadravati	BJP	G. R. Praveen Patel	INC	B. K. Sangameshwar	JD(S)	M. J. Appaji
Shimoga	113	Shimoga	BJP	K. S. Eshwarappa	INC	K. B. Prasanna Kumar	JD(S)	H. N. Niranjan
Shimoga	114	Tirthahalli	BJP	Araga Jnanendra	INC	Kimmane Rathnakar	JD(S)	R. M. Manjunatha Gowda
Shimoga	115	Shikaripura	BJP	B. S. Yediyurappa	INC	Goni Malatesha	JD(S)	H. T. Balegar
Shimoga	116	Sorab	BJP	Kumar Bangarappa	INC	Raju Talluru	JD(S)	Madhu Bangarappa
Shimoga	117	Sagar	BJP	Hartalu Halappa	INC	Kagodu Thimmappa	JD(S)	M. B. Girishgowda
Udupi	118	Byndoor	BJP	B. M. Sukumar Shetty	INC	K. Gopala Poojary	JD(S)	Ravi Shetty
Udupi	119	Kundapura	BJP	Halady Srinivas Shetty	INC	Rakesh Malli	JD(S)	Thekkatte Prakash Shetty
Udupi	120	Udupi	BJP	K. Raghupati Bhat	INC	Pramod Madhwaraj	JD(S)	Birthi G. Bhandary
Udupi	121	Kapu	BJP	Lalaji Mendon	INC	Vinay Kumar Sorake	JD(S)	M. Mansoor Ibrahim
Udupi	122	Karkal	BJP	V. Sunil Kumar	INC	H. Gopal Bhandary	BSP	Uday Kumar
Chikmagalur	123	Sringeri	BJP	D. N. Jeevaraj	INC	T. D. Rajegowda	JD(S)	H. G. Venkatesh
Chikmagalur	124	Mudigere (SC)	BJP	M. P. Kumaraswamy	INC	C. Motamma	JD(S)	B. B. Ningaiah
Chikmagalur	125	Chikmagalur	BJP	C. T. Ravi	INC	B. L. Shankar	JD(S)	B. H. Harisha
Chikmagalur	126	Tarikere	BJP	D. S. Suresh	INC	S. M. Nagaraju	JD(S)	T. H. Shivashankarappa
Chikmagalur	127	Kadur	BJP	K. S. Prakash	INC	K. S. Anand	JD(S)	Y. S. V. Datta
Tumakuru	128	Chiknayakanhalli	BJP	J. C. Madhu Swamy	INC	Santhosh Jayachandra	JD(S)	C. B. Suresh Babu
Tumakuru	129	Tiptur	BJP	B. C. Nagesh	INC	K. Shadakshari	JD(S)	Lokeshwara
Tumakuru	130	Turuvekere	BJP	A. S. Jayaram	INC	Rangappa T. Chowdri	JD(S)	M. T. Krishnappa
Tumakuru	131	Kunigal	BJP	D. Krishna Kumar	INC	H. D. Ranganath	JD(S)	D. Nagarajaiah
Tumakuru	132	Tumkur City	BJP	G. B. Jyothi Ganesh	INC	S. Rafeeq Ahmed	JD(S)	N. Govindaraju
Tumakuru	133	Tumkur Rural	BJP	B. Suresh Gowda	INC	Rayasandra Ravikumar	JD(S)	D. C. Gowri Shankar
Tumakuru	134	Koratagere (SC)	BJP	Y. H. Huchhaiah	INC	G. Parameshwara	JD(S)	P. R. Sudhakara Lal
Tumakuru	135	Gubbi	BJP	G. N. Bettaswamy	INC	K. Kumar	JD(S)	S. R. Srinivas
Tumakuru	136	Sira	BJP	S. R. Gowda	INC	T. B. Jayachandra	JD(S)	B. Sathyanarayana
Tumakuru	137	Pavagada (SC)	BJP	G. V. Balaram	INC	Venkataramanappa	JD(S)	K. M. Thimmarayappa
Tumakuru	138	Madhugiri	BJP	S. E. Ramesh Reddy	INC	K. N. Rajanna	JD(S)	M. V. Veerabhadraiah
Chikkaballapura	139	Gauribidanur	BJP	K. Jaipal Reddy	INC	N. H. Shivashankara Reddy	JD(S)	C. R. Narasimhamurthy
Chikkaballapura	140	Bagepalli	BJP	P. Saikumar	INC	S. N. Subbareddy	JD(S)	C. R. Manohar
Chikkaballapura	141	Chikkaballapur	BJP	G. V. Manjunatha	INC	K. Sudhakar	JD(S)	K. P. Bachegowda
Chikkaballapura	142	Sidlaghatta	BJP	H. Suresh	INC	V. Muniyappa	JD(S)	B. N. Ravikumar
Chikkaballapura	143	Chintamani	BJP	Naa Shankar	INC	Vani Krishnareddy	JD(S)	J. K. Krishna Reddy
Kolar	144	Srinivaspur	BJP	K. N. Venugopal	INC	K. R. Ramesh Kumar	JD(S)	G. K. Venkatashiva Reddy
Kolar	145	Mulbagal (SC)	BJP	Amaresh	(Note: The Congress party was unable to contest the Mulbagal constituency because its nominated candidate, G. Manjunath, was disqualified by the High Court for submitting a false caste certificate. As the nomination deadline had expired, the party had no time to field an alternative candidate, resulting in its absence from the electoral contest in that seat.)		JD(S)	Samruddhi Manjunath
Kolar	146	Kolar Gold Field (SC)	BJP	Ashwini Sampangi	INC	M. Roopakala	JD(S)	M. Backthavachalam
Kolar	147	Bangarapet (SC)	BJP	B. P. Venkatamuniyappa	INC	S. N. Narayanaswamy	JD(S)	M. Mallesh Babu
Kolar	148	Kolar	BJP	R. Venkatachalapathi	INC	Sy. Zameer Pasha	JD(S)	K. Srinivasa Gowda
Kolar	149	Malur	BJP	Krisshnaiah Setty	INC	K. Y. Nanjegowda	JD(S)	K. S. Manjunath Gowda
Bangalore Urban	150	Yelahanka	BJP	S. R. Vishwanath	INC	M. N. Gopalakrishna	JD(S)	A. M. Hanumanthegowda
Bangalore Urban	151	K.R. Pura	BJP	N. S. Nandiesha Reddy	INC	Byrati Basavaraj	JD(S)	D. A. Gopala
Bangalore Urban	152	Byatarayanapura	BJP	A. Ravi	INC	Krishna Byre Gowda	JD(S)	T. G. Chandra
Bangalore Urban	153	Yeshvanthapura	BJP	Jaggesh	INC	S. T. Somashekhar	JD(S)	T. N. Javarayi Gowda
Bangalore Urban	154	Rajarajeshwarinagar (Note: ECI postponed the Rajarajeshwarinagar Assembly election from May 12 to May 28, 2018, after 9,746 fake voter ID cards were seized, citing the need for a thorough probe to ensure electoral integrity.)	BJP	P. Muniraju Gowda	INC	Munirathna	JD(S)	G. H. Ramachandra
Bangalore Urban	155	Dasarahalli	BJP	S. Muniraju	INC	P. N. Krishnamurthy	JD(S)	R. Manjunatha
Bangalore Urban	156	Mahalakshmi Layout	BJP	N. L. Narendra Babu	INC	H. S. Manjunatha	JD(S)	K. Gopalaiah
Bangalore Urban	157	Malleshwaram	BJP	C. N. Ashwath Narayan	INC	Kengal Shreepada Renu	JD(S)	N. Madhusudhan
Bangalore Urban	158	Hebbal	BJP	Y. A. Narayanaswamy	INC	B. S. Suresh	JD(S)	Hanumanthe Gowda
Bangalore Urban	159	Pulakeshinagar (SC)	BJP	Susheela Devaraj	INC	Akhanda S. Murthy	JD(S)	B. Prasannakumar
Bangalore Urban	160	Sarvagnanagar	BJP	M. N. Reddy	INC	K. J. George	JD(S)	Anwar Sharieff
Bangalore Urban	161	C.V. Raman Nagar (SC)	BJP	S. Raghu	INC	R. Sampath Raj	JD(S)	P. Ramesh
Bangalore Urban	162	Shivajinagar	BJP	K. Subramanya Naidu	INC	R. Roshan Baig	JD(S)	Shaik Masthan Ali
Bangalore Urban	163	Shanti Nagar	BJP	K. Vasudevamurthy	INC	N. A. Haris	JD(S)	N. R. Sridhar Reddy
Bangalore Urban	164	Gandhi Nagar	BJP	A. R. Sapthagiri Gowda	INC	Dinesh Gundu Rao	JD(S)	V. Narayanaswamy
Bangalore Urban	165	Rajaji Nagar	BJP	S. Suresh Kumar	INC	G. Padmavathi	JD(S)	H. M. Krishnamurthy
Bangalore Urban	166	Govindraj Nagar	BJP	V. Somanna	INC	Priyakrishna	JD(S)	A. Nagendra Prasad
Bangalore Urban	167	Vijay Nagar	BJP	H. Ravindra	INC	M. Krishnappa	JD(S)	N. E. Paramashiva
Bangalore Urban	168	Chamrajpet	BJP	M. Lakshminarayana	INC	B. Z. Zameer Khan	JD(S)	B. K. Altaf Khan
Bangalore Urban	169	Chickpet	BJP	Uday Garudachar	INC	R. V. Devraj	JD(S)	D. Hemachandra Sagar
Bangalore Urban	170	Basavanagudi	BJP	L. A. Ravi Subramanya	INC	M. Boregowda	JD(S)	K. Bagegowda
Bangalore Urban	171	Padmanaba Nagar	BJP	R. Ashoka	INC	M. Srinivas	JD(S)	V. K. Gopal
Bangalore Urban	172	B. T. M. Layout	BJP	Lallesh Reddy	INC	Ramalinga Reddy	JD(S)	K. Devadas
Bangalore Urban	173	Jayanagar (Note: The Jayanagar Assembly election was postponed after the BJP candidate and sitting MLA, B. N. Vijaya Kumar, passed away due to a cardiac arrest just before polling day. The bypoll was later held on June 11, 2018, and was won by Congress candidate Sowmya Reddy.)	BJP	B. N. Prahlad	INC	Sowmya Reddy	JD(S)	Kalegowda
Bangalore Urban	174	Mahadevapura (SC)	BJP	Arvind Limbavali	INC	A. C. Srinivasa	JD(S)	K. Sathish
Bangalore Urban	175	Bommanahalli	BJP	M. Satish Reddy	INC	Sushma Rajagopala Reddy	JD(S)	T. R. Prasad
Bangalore Urban	176	Bangalore South	BJP	M. Krishnappa	INC	R. K. Ramesh	JD(S)	R. Prabhakar Reddy
Bangalore Urban	177	Anekal (SC)	BJP	A. Narayanaswamy	INC	B. Shivanna	BSP	G. Srinivas
Bangalore Rural	178	Hosakote	BJP	Sharath Bache Gowda	INC	M. T. B. Nagaraj	JD(S)	Krishna Murthy R.
Bangalore Rural	179	Devanahalli (SC)	BJP	K. Nagesh	INC	Venkataswamy	JD(S)	L. N. Narayanaswamy
Bangalore Rural	180	Doddaballapur	BJP	J. Narasimhaswamy	INC	T. Venkataramanaiah	JD(S)	B. Munegowda
Bangalore Rural	181	Nelamangala (SC)	BJP	M. V. Nagaraju	INC	R. Narayanaswamy	JD(S)	K. Sreenivasamurthy
Ramanagara	182	Magadi	BJP	M. C. Hanumantharaj	INC	H. C. Balakrishna	JD(S)	A. Manjunath
Ramanagara	183	Ramanagaram	BJP	Leelavathi	INC	H. A. Iqbal Hussain	JD(S)	H. D. Kumaraswamy
Ramanagara	184	Kanakapura	BJP	Nandini Gowda	INC	D. K. Shivakumar	JD(S)	Narayana Gowda
Ramanagara	185	Channapatna	BJP	C. P. Yogeshwara	INC	H. M. Revanna	JD(S)	H. D. Kumaraswamy
Mandya	186	Malavalli (SC)	BJP	B. Somashekhar	INC	P. M. Narendraswamy	JD(S)	K. Annadani
Mandya	187	Maddur	BJP	Madduru Sathisha	INC	Madhu G. Madegowda	JD(S)	D. C. Thammanna
Mandya	188	Melukote	BJP	Sundahalli Somashekara	(Note: Congress party did not contest the Melukote seat and instead supported Darshan Puttannaiah of the Swaraj India party.)		JD(S)	C. S. Puttaraju
Mandya	189	Mandya	BJP	N. Shivanna	INC	P. Ravikumar	JD(S)	M. Srinivas
Mandya	190	Shrirangapattana	BJP	K. S. Nanjundegowda	INC	Ramesha Bandisidde	JD(S)	Ravindra Srikantaiah
Mandya	191	Nagamangala	BJP	Parthasarathy Gowda	INC	N. Chaluvaraya Swamy	JD(S)	Suresh Gowdaa
Mandya	192	Krishnarajapete	BJP	B. C. Manju	INC	K. B. Chandrashekar	JD(S)	Narayana Gowda
Hassan	193	Shravanabelagola	BJP	Shivananjegowda	INC	C. S. Puttegowda	JD(S)	C. N. Balakrishna
Hassan	194	Arsikere	BJP	G. Mariswamy	INC	G. B. Shashidhara	JD(S)	K. M. Shivalinge Gowda
Hassan	195	Belur	BJP	H. K. Suresh	INC	Keerthana Rudreshagowda	JD(S)	K. S. Lingesha
Hassan	196	Hassan	BJP	Preetham J. Gowda	INC	H. K. Mahesh	JD(S)	H. S. Prakash
Hassan	197	Holenarasipur	BJP	M. N. Raju	INC	B. P. Manjegowda	JD(S)	H. D. Revanna
Hassan	198	Arkalgud	BJP	H. Yogaramesha	INC	A. Manju	JD(S)	A. T. Ramaswamy
Hassan	199	Sakleshpur (SC)	BJP	Somashekar Jayaraj	INC	M. Siddaiah	JD(S)	H. K. Kumaraswamy
Dakshina Kannada	200	Belthangady	BJP	Harish Poonja	INC	K. Vasantha Bangera	JD(S)	Sumathi S. Hegde
Dakshina Kannada	201	Moodabidri	BJP	Umanatha Kotian	INC	Abhayachandra Jain	JD(S)	Jeevan Krishna Shetty
Dakshina Kannada	202	Mangalore City North	BJP	Y. Bharath Shetty	INC	Mohiuddin Bava		
Dakshina Kannada	203	Mangalore City South	BJP	D. Vedavyas Kamath	INC	J. R. Lobo	JD(S)	Rathnakara Suvarna
Dakshina Kannada	204	Mangalore	BJP	Santhosh Kumar Rai	INC	U. T. Khader	JD(S)	K. Ashraf
Dakshina Kannada	205	Bantval	BJP	U. Rajesh Naik	INC	Ramanath Rai		
Dakshina Kannada	206	Puttur	BJP	Sanjeeva Matandoor	INC	Shakunthala T. Shetty	JD(S)	I. C. Kailas Gowda
Dakshina Kannada	207	Sullia (SC)	BJP	S. Angara	INC	B. Raghu	BSP	Raghu
Kodagu	208	Madikeri	BJP	Appachu Ranjan	INC	K. P. Chandrakala	JD(S)	B. A. Jivijaya
Kodagu	209	Virajpet	BJP	K. G. Bopaiah	INC	C. S. Arun Machaiah	JD(S)	M. M. Sanketh Poovaiah
Mysore	210	Periyapatna	BJP	S. Manjunatha	INC	K. Venkatesh	JD(S)	K. Mahadeva
Mysore	211	Krishnarajanagara	BJP	H. G. Shwetha Gopala	INC	D. Ravishankar	JD(S)	S. R. Mahesh
Mysore	212	Hunasuru	BJP	J. S. Ramesh Kumar	INC	H. P. Manjunath	JD(S)	Adagur Vishwanath
Mysore	213	Heggadadevankote (ST)	BJP	Siddaraju	INC	Anil Chikkamadhu	JD(S)	Chikkanna
Mysore	214	Nanjangud (SC)	BJP	B. Harshavardhan	INC	Kalale N. Keshavamurthy	JD(S)	H. S. Dayanandamurthy
Mysore	215	Chamundeshwari	BJP	S. R. Gopalrao	INC	Siddaramaiah	JD(S)	G. T. Devegowda
Mysore	216	Krishnaraja	BJP	S. A. Ramadas	INC	M. K. Somashekar	JD(S)	K. V. Mallesh
Mysore	217	Chamaraja	BJP	L. Nagendra	INC	Vasu	JD(S)	K. S. Rangappa
Mysore	218	Narasimharaja	BJP	S. Satheesh	INC	Tanveer Sait	JD(S)	Abdul Azeez
Mysore	219	Varuna	BJP	T. Basavaraju	INC	Yathindra S.	JD(S)	Abhishek S. Manegar
Mysore	220	T.Narasipur (SC)	BJP	S. Shankar	INC	H. C. Mahadevappa	JD(S)	M. Ashvin Kumar
Chamarajanagar	221	Hanur	BJP	Preethan Nagappa	INC	R. Narendra	JD(S)	M. R. Manjunath
Chamarajanagar	222	Kollegal (SC)	BJP	G. N. Nanjunda Swamy	INC	A. R. Krishnamurthy	BSP	N. Mahesh
Chamarajanagar	223	Chamarajanagar	BJP	K. R. Mallikarjunappa	INC	C. Puttarangashetty	BSP	A. M. Mallikarjunaswamy
Chamarajanagar	224	Gundlupet	BJP	C. S. Niranjan Kumar	INC	M. C. Mohan Kumari	BSP	S. Guruprasad

== Election campaign ==
The Bharatiya Janata Party (BJP) officially began its election campaign on 2 November 2017. The party spent 85 days covering all the assembly constituencies, culminating in Bangalore on 4 February 2018, with Prime Minister Narendra Modi addressing it. In early March, the party launched a 14-day Protect Bengaluru March travelling across Bangalore aimed at, according to the party, "reviving" and "rebuilding" the city from Indian National Congress' "criminal neglect".

In December 2017, the Karnataka Pradesh Congress Committee, although not part of the election campaign, undertook a task of setting up booth-level committees at 54,261 locations in the state which will be responsible to disseminate information on various programs of the ruling Indian National Congress and their implementation. The move was seen as an "extensive outreach program" preceding the elections.

== Opinion polls ==
Polling firm/commissioner	Date published					Majority
Polling firm/commissioner	Date published	BJP	INC	JD(S)+	Others	Majority
Public TV	2 January 2018	85–90	90–95	40–45	0–6	Hung
CHS	13 January 2018	75–76; 36.40%	77–81; 33.20%	64–66; 24.90%		Hung
Creative Center for Political and Social Studies	2 February 2018	113	85	25	1	BJP
C-Fore	26 March 2018	80; 31.00%	126; 46.00%	27; 16.00%	1; 7.00%	INC
India Today-Karvy Insights	13 April 2018	78–86; 35%	90–101; 37%	34–43; 19%	2–12; 9%	Hung
BTV	19 April 2018	82–87; 35%	94–99; 37%	39–44; 19%	2–6; 9%	Hung
Times Now-VMR	23 April 2018	89; 35%	91; 37%	40; 19%	4; 9%	Hung
C-Fore	1 May 2018	63–73; 35%	118–128; 37%	29–36; 20%	2–7; 8%	INC
ABP News-CSDS	7 May 2018	79–89; 33%	92–102; 38%	34–42; 22%	1–7; 7%	Hung
Flash News – TV 5	7 May 2018	110–120; 36–38%	65–75; 33–35%	38–42; 20–22%	2–6	BJP
Spick Media	9 May 2018	88	101	31	3	Hung
India TV	9 May 2018	85	96	38	4	Hung
News X-CNX	9 May 2018	87	90	39	7	Hung
Average as on 8 May 2018		87	96	36	05	Hung

=== Preferred chief minister polling ===
Some opinion pollsters asked voters which party leader they would prefer as chief minister – Siddaramaiah (Indian National Congress), B. S. Yeddyurappa (Bharatiya Janata Party), or H. D. Kumaraswamy (Janata Dal (Secular)). Lokniti-CSDS conducted surveys between 11 and 15 January interviewing 878 people. While 34 percent of the sample wanted Siddaramaiah to remain the chief minister for the next term, 19 percent chose Kumaraswamy and 14 percent chose Yeddyurappa. A poll conducted by CHS in the same month found that Kumaraswamy was the first choice, followed by Yeddyurappa and Siddaramaiah in that order. C-Fore's survey of a sample size of 22,357 voters across 154 assembly constituencies between 1 and 25 March showed that Siddaramaiah, with 45 percent, was the most popular choice for chief minister, followed by Yeddyurappa at 26 percent and Kumaraswamy at 13 percent, while 16 percent preferred 'others'.

== Exit polls ==
The exit polls remained divided, with only one predicting that a party – BJP – would get past the majority mark. Five polls predicted that BJP would have the most seats, while two predicted that the Congress was in a comfortable lead, and one predicted a cliffhanger. Today's Chanakya's exit poll, which was released last and took into account voting right until polling closure time, predicted a clear majority for BJP.

Exit polls
Polling firm/commissioner	Date published					Majority
Polling firm/commissioner	Date published	BJP	INC	JD(S)	Others	Majority
IndiaTV-VMR	12 May 2018	94	97	28	3	Hung
ABP News-C Voter	12 May 2018	110	88	24	2	Hung
Times Now-VMR	12 May 2018	87	97	35	3	Hung
Times Now-Today's Chanakya	12 May 2018	120	73	26	3	BJP
India Today-Axis My India	12 May 2018	85	111	26	0	Hung
NewsX-CNX	12 May 2018	106	75	37	4	Hung
News Nation	12 May 2018	107	73	38	4	Hung
Average	12 May 2018	101	88	31	4	Hung

== Results ==
Seat share
1. BJP (46.4%)
2. INC (35.2%)
3. JD(S) (16.5%)
4. Others (1.34%)

Parties and coalitions	Popular vote			Seats	
Parties and coalitions	Votes	%	±pp	Won	+/−
Bharatiya Janata Party (BJP)	13,328,524	36.35	▲16.3	104	▲64
Indian National Congress (INC)	13,986,526	38.14	▲1.4	80	▼42
Janata Dal (Secular) (JDS)	6,726,667	18.3	▼1.9	37	▼3
Independents (IND)	1,438,106	3.9	▼3.5	1	▼8
Bahujan Samaj Party (BSP)	108,592	0.32		1	▲1
Karnataka Pragnyavantha Janatha Party (KPJP)	74,229	0.2		1	▲1
Other parties and candidates	683,632	2.2		0	▼13
None of the Above (NOTA)	322,841	0.9			
Total	36,739,562	100.00		224	±0
Valid votes	36,739,562	99.92			
Invalid votes	30,392	0.08			
Votes cast / turnout	36,769,954	72.50			
Abstentions	13,948,244	27.50			
Registered voters	50,718,198				

=== Region-wise break-up ===
Vote share
1. INC (38.1%)
2. BJP (36.4%)
3. JD(S) (18.3%)
4. Others (7.21%)

Region	Seats				
Region	Seats	BJP	INC	JDS	OTH
Mysuru Karnataka	57	11	17	27	2
Kitturu Karnataka	50	30	17	2	1
Kalyana Karnataka	40	15	21	4	—N/a
Greater Bengaluru	32	11	17	4	—N/a
Madhya Karnataka	26	21	5	—N/a	—N/a
Karavali Karnataka	19	16	3	—N/a	—N/a
Total	224	104	80	37	3

=== District-wise break-up ===
District	Seats				
District	Seats	BJP	INC	JDS	OTH
Belagavi	18	10	8	—N/a	—N/a
Bagalkote	7	5	2	—N/a	—N/a
Vijayapura	8	3	3	2	—N/a
Kalaburagi	9	4	5	—N/a	—N/a
Yadagiri	4	2	1	1	—N/a
Bidar	6	1	4	1	—N/a
Raichuru	7	2	3	2	—N/a
Koppala	5	3	2	—N/a	—N/a
Gadaga	4	3	1	—N/a	—N/a
Dharwada	7	5	2	—N/a	—N/a
Uttara Kannada (Karwara)	6	4	2	—N/a	—N/a
Haveri	6	4	1	—N/a	1
Ballari	9	3	6	—N/a	—N/a
Chitradurga	6	5	1	—N/a	—N/a
Davanagere	8	6	2	—N/a	—N/a
Shivamogga	7	6	1	—N/a	—N/a
Udupi	5	5	—N/a	—N/a	—N/a
Chikkamagaluru	5	4	1	—N/a	—N/a
Tumakuru	11	4	3	4	—N/a
Chikkaballapura	5	—N/a	4	1	—N/a
Kolar	6	—N/a	4	1	1
Bengaluru Urban	28	11	15	2	—N/a
Bengaluru Rural	4	—N/a	2	2	—N/a
Mandya	7	—N/a	—N/a	7	—N/a
Hassana	7	1	—N/a	6	—N/a
Kodagu	2	2	—N/a	—N/a	—N/a
Mysuru	11	3	3	5	—N/a
Chamarajanagara	4	1	2	—N/a	1
Ramanagara	4	—N/a	1	3	—N/a
Dakshina Kannada	8	7	1	—N/a	—N/a
Total	224	104	80	37	3

=== List of winning candidates ===
The election results for each constituency are as follows:

District	Constituency		Winner				Runner up				Margin	%
District	#	Name	Candidate	Party	Votes	%	Candidate	Party	Votes	%	Margin	%
Belagavi	1	Nippani	Shashikala Jolle	BJP	87,006	50.51	Kakaso P. Patil	INC	78,500	45.57	8,506	4.94
Belagavi	2	Chikkodi-Sadalga	Ganesh Hukkeri	INC	91,467	51.04	Annasaheb Jolle	BJP	80,898	45.14	10,569	5.90
Belagavi	3	Athani	Mahesh Kumathalli	INC	82,094	48.13	Laxman Savadi	BJP	79,763	46.76	2,331	1.37
Belagavi	4	Kagwad	Shrimant Patil	INC	83,060	56.99	Bharamgouda A. Kage	BJP	50,118	34.39	32,942	22.60
Belagavi	5	Kudachi (SC)	P. Rajeev	BJP	67,781	49.60	Amit S. Ghatage	INC	52,773	38.62	15,008	10.98
Belagavi	6	Raybag (SC)	Duryodhan Aihole	BJP	67,502	44.88	Pradeepkumar R. Malagi	INC	50,954	33.88	16,548	11.00
Belagavi	7	Hukkeri	Umesh Katti	BJP	83,588	52.94	Appayyagouda B. Patil	INC	68,203	43.20	15,385	9.74
Belagavi	8	Arabhavi	Balachandra Jarkiholi	BJP	96,144	54.34	Bhimappa Gundappa Gadad	JD(S)	48,816	27.59	47,328	26.75
Belagavi	9	Gokak	Ramesh Jarkiholi	INC	90,249	51.87	Ashok Pujari	BJP	75,969	43.67	14,280	8.20
Belagavi	10	Yemkanmardi (ST)	Satish Jarkiholi	INC	73,512	49.16	Astagi Maruti Mallappa	BJP	70,662	47.26	2,850	1.90
Belagavi	11	Belgaum Uttar	Anil S. Benake	BJP	79,060	53.63	Fairoz Nuruddin Saith	INC	61,793	41.91	17,267	11.72
Belagavi	12	Belgaum Dakshin	Abhay Patil	BJP	84,498	57.59	M. D. Lakshminarayana	INC	25,806	17.59	58,692	40.00
Belagavi	13	Belgaum Rural	Lakshmi Hebbalkar	INC	1,02,040	54.74	Sanjay Patil	BJP	50,316	26.99	51,724	27.75
Belagavi	14	Khanapur	Anjali Nimbalkar	INC	36,649	23.76	Vithal Halagekar	BJP	31,516	20.44	5,133	3.32
Belagavi	15	Kittur	D. M. Basavantaray	BJP	73,155	49.26	D. B. Inamdar	INC	40,293	27.13	32,862	22.13
Belagavi	16	Bailhongal	Mahantesh Koujalagi	INC	47,040	32.49	Jagdish C. Metgud	IND	41,918	28.95	5,122	3.54
Belagavi	17	Saundatti Yellamma	Anand Mamani	BJP	62,480	40.65	Anand Chopra	IND	56,189	36.56	6,291	4.09
Belagavi	18	Ramdurg	Mahadevappa Yadawad	BJP	68,349	45.17	Ashok Pattan	INC	65,474	43.27	2,875	1.90
Bagalkot	19	Mudhol (SC)	Govind Karjol	BJP	76,431	51.63	Bandiwaddar Chinnappa	INC	60,949	41.17	15,482	10.46
Bagalkot	20	Terdal	Siddu Savadi	BJP	87,583	50.45	Umashree	INC	66,470	38.29	21,113	12.16
Bagalkot	21	Jamkhandi	Anand Nyamagouda	INC	49,245	32.06	Kulkarni Shrikant Subrao	BJP	46,450	30.24	2,795	1.82
Bagalkot	22	Bilgi	Murugesh Nirani	BJP	85,135	49.12	J. T. Patil	INC	80,324	46.34	4,811	2.78
Bagalkot	23	Badami	Siddaramaiah	INC	67,599	41.24	B. Sriramulu	BJP	65,903	40.20	1,696	1.04
Bagalkot	24	Bagalkot	Veerabhadrayya Charantimath	BJP	85,653	53.03	H. Y. Meti	INC	69,719	43.17	15,934	9.86
Bagalkot	25	Hungund	Doddanagouda G. Patil	BJP	65,012	41.53	Vijayanand Kashappanavar	INC	59,785	38.19	5,227	3.34
Vijayapura	26	Muddebihal	A. S. Patil	BJP	63,512	45.76	C. S. Nadagouda	INC	54,879	39.54	8,633	6.22
Vijayapura	27	Devar Hippargi	Somanagouda B. Patil	BJP	48,245	34.69	Bhimanagouda Patil	JD(S)	44,892	32.28	3,353	2.41
Vijayapura	28	Basavana Bagevadi	Shivanand Patil	INC	58,647	39.79	Somanagouda B. Patil	JD(S)	55,461	37.63	3,186	2.16
Vijayapura	29	Babaleshwar	M. B. Patil	INC	98,339	57.29	Vijayakumar S. Patil	BJP	68,624	39.98	29,715	17.31
Vijayapura	30	Bijapur City	Basangouda Patil Yatnal	BJP	76,308	50.30	Abdul Hameed Mushrif	INC	69,895	46.07	6,413	4.23
Vijayapura	31	Nagthan (SC)	Devanand Fulasing Chavan	JD(S)	59,709	34.00	Katakadond Vittal Dondiba	INC	54,108	30.81	5,601	3.19
Vijayapura	32	Indi	Y. R. Pati	INC	50,401	29.98	B. D. Patil Hanjagi	JD(S)	40,463	24.07	9,938	5.91
Vijayapura	33	Sindgi	M. C. Managuli	JD(S)	70,865	44.15	Ramesh Bhusanur	BJP	61,560	38.36	9,305	5.79
Kalaburagi	34	Afzalpur	M. Y. Patil	INC	71,735	47.92	Malikayya Guttedar	BJP	61,141	40.84	10,594	7.08
Kalaburagi	35	Jevargi	Ajay Singh	INC	68,508	42.36	Doddappa Gouda S. Patil Naribol	BJP	52,452	32.43	16,056	9.93
Yadgir	36	Shorapur (ST)	Narasimha Nayak	BJP	1,04,426	52.96	Raja Venkatappa Naik	INC	81,858	41.51	22,568	11.45
Yadgir	37	Shahapur	Sharanabasappa Darshanapur	INC	78,642	50.27	Guru Patil Sirwal	BJP	47,668	30.47	30,974	19.80
Yadgir	38	Yadgir	Venkatreddy Mudnal	BJP	62,227	43.08	Dr. A. B. Malaka Reddy	INC	49,346	34.16	12,881	8.92
Yadgir	39	Gurmitkal	Naganagouda Kandkur	JD(S)	79,627	52.40	Baburao Chinchansur	INC	55,147	36.29	24,480	16.11
Kalaburagi	40	Chittapur (SC)	Priyank Kharge	INC	69,700	49.65	Valmiki Nayak	BJP	65,307	46.53	4,393	3.12
Kalaburagi	41	Sedam	Rajkumar Patil	BJP	80,668	50.87	Sharan Prakash Patil	INC	73,468	46.33	7,200	4.54
Kalaburagi	42	Chincholi (SC)	Umesh. G. Jadhav	INC	73,905	55.57	Sunil Vallyapure	BJP	54,693	41.12	19,212	14.45
Kalaburagi	43	Gulbarga Rural (SC)	Basawaraj Mattimud	BJP	61,750	40.49	Vijaykumar G. Ramakrishna	INC	49,364	32.37	12,386	8.12
Kalaburagi	44	Gulbarga Dakshin	Dattatraya C. Patil Revoor	BJP	64,788	44.88	Allamprabhu Patil	INC	59,357	41.12	5,431	3.76
Kalaburagi	45	Gulbarga Uttar	Kaneez Fathima	INC	64,311	43.29	Chandrakant Patil	BJP	58,371	39.29	5,940	4.00
Kalaburagi	46	Aland	Subhash Guttedar	BJP	76,815	47.83	B. R. Patil	INC	76,118	47.39	697	0.44
Bidar	47	Basavakalyan	B. Narayan Rao	INC	61,425	42.27	Mallikarjun Khuba	BJP	44,153	30.38	17,272	11.89
Bidar	48	Humnabad	Rajashekar Patil	INC	74,945	47.04	Subhash	BJP	43,131	27.07	31,814	19.97
Bidar	49	Bidar South	Bandeppa Kashempur	JD(S)	55,107	39.68	Dr. Shailendra Beldale	BJP	42,365	30.50	12,742	9.18
Bidar	50	Bidar	Rahim Khan	INC	73,270	52.10	Surayakanth Nagmarpalli	BJP	63,025	44.82	10,245	7.28
Bidar	51	Bhalki	Eshwara Khandre	INC	84,673	50.68	D. K. Sidram	BJP	63,235	37.85	21,438	12.83
Bidar	52	Aurad (SC)	Prabhu Chauhan	BJP	75,061	50.92	Vijaykumar	INC	64,469	43.73	10,592	7.19
Raichur	53	Raichur Rural (ST)	Basanagouda Daddal	INC	66,656	41.23	Tipparaju Hawaldar	BJP	56,692	35.06	9,964	6.17
Raichur	54	Raichur	S. Shivaraj Patil	BJP	56,511	45.61	Syed Yaseen	INC	45,520	36.74	10,991	8.87
Raichur	55	Manvi (ST)	Raja Venkatappa Nayak	JD(S)	53,548	34.76	Dr. Tanusree Preeti	IND	37,733	24.49	15,815	10.27
Raichur	56	Devadurga (ST)	K. Shivanagouda Naik	BJP	67,003	42.58	A Rajashekar Nayak	INC	45,958	29.20	21,045	13.38
Raichur	57	Lingsugur (SC)	D. S. Hoolageri	INC	54,230	33.04	Bandi Shiddu	JD(S)	49,284	30.02	4,946	3.02
Raichur	58	Sindhanur	Venkatrao Nadagouda	JD(S)	71,514	43.75	Hampanagouda Badarli	INC	69,917	42.77	1,597	0.98
Raichur	59	Maski (ST)	Pratapagouda Patil	INC	60,387	44.17	Basanagouda Turvihal	BJP	60,174	44.01	213	0.16
Koppal	60	Kushtagi	Amaregowda Bayyapur	INC	87,566	52.73	Doddanagouda H. Patil	BJP	69,535	41.87	18,031	10.86
Koppal	61	Kanakagiri (SC)	Basavaraj Dadesugur	BJP	87,735	52.38	Shivaraj Tangadagi	INC	73,510	43.88	14,225	8.50
Koppal	62	Gangawati	Paranna Munavalli	BJP	67,617	45.91	Iqbal Ansari	INC	59,644	40.50	7,973	5.41
Koppal	63	Yelburga	Halappa Achar	BJP	79,072	48.02	Basavaraj Rayareddy	INC	65,754	39.93	13,318	8.09
Koppal	64	Koppal	K. Raghavendra Hitnal	INC	98,783	54.64	Amaresh Sanganna Karadi	BJP	72,432	40.07	26,351	14.57
Gadag	65	Shirahatti (SC)	Ramappa Sobeppa Lamani	BJP	91,967	57.26	Ramakrishna S. Doddamani	INC	61,974	38.59	29,993	18.67
Gadag	66	Gadag	H. K. Patil	INC	77,699	48.41	Anil Mensinakai	BJP	75,831	47.25	1,868	1.16
Gadag	67	Ron	Kalakappa Bandi	BJP	83,735	49.09	Gurupadagouda Patil	INC	76,401	44.79	7,334	4.30
Gadag	68	Nargund	C. C. Patil	BJP	73,045	50.52	B. R. Yavagal	INC	65,066	45.00	7,979	5.52
Dharwad	69	Navalgund	Shankar Patil Munenakoppa	BJP	65,718	41.19	N. H. Konaraddi	JD(S)	45,197	28.33	20,521	12.86
Dharwad	70	Kundgol	C. S. Shivalli	INC	64,871	43.97	C. S. Ishwaragod	BJP	64,237	43.54	634	0.43
Dharwad	71	Dharwad	Amrut Desai	BJP	85,123	54.70	Vinay Kulkarni	INC	64,783	41.63	20,340	13.07
Dharwad	72	Hubli-Dharwad-East (SC)	Abbayya Prasad	INC	77,080	56.64	Chandrashekar Gokak	BJP	55,613	40.86	21,467	15.78
Dharwad	73	Hubli-Dharwad Central	Jagadish Shettar	BJP	75,794	51.31	Dr. Mahesh Nalwad	INC	54,488	36.89	21,306	14.42
Dharwad	74	Hubli-Dharwad-West	Arvind Bellad	BJP	96,462	61.16	Mhd. Ismail Tamatgar	INC	55,975	35.49	40,487	25.67
Dharwad	75	Kalghatgi	C M Nimbannavar	BJP	83,267	54.82	Santosh Lad	INC	57,270	37.70	25,997	17.12
Uttara Kannada	76	Haliyal	R. V. Deshpande	INC	61,577	46.41	Sunil Hegade	BJP	56,437	42.53	5,140	3.88
Uttara Kannada	77	Karwar	Roopali Naik	BJP	60,339	37.69	Anand Asnotikar	JD(S)	46,275	28.90	14,064	8.79
Uttara Kannada	78	Kumta	Dinakar Keshav Shetty	BJP	59,392	40.63	Sharada Mohan Shetty	INC	26,642	18.23	32,750	22.40
Uttara Kannada	79	Bhatkal	Sunil Biliya Naik	BJP	83,172	50.14	Mankala Vaidya	INC	77,242	46.56	5,930	3.58
Uttara Kannada	80	Sirsi	V. H. Kageri	BJP	70,595	45.52	Bhimanna T. Naik	INC	53,134	34.26	17,461	11.26
Uttara Kannada	81	Yellapur	Arbail Shivaram Hebbar	INC	66,290	47.26	Andalagi V. S. Patil	BJP	64,807	46.20	1,483	1.06
Haveri	82	Hangal	C. M. Udasi	BJP	80,529	49.10	Srinivas Mane	INC	74,015	45.13	6,514	3.97
Haveri	83	Shiggaon	Basavaraj Bommai	BJP	83,868	49.02	Syed Azeempeer Khadri	INC	74,603	43.61	9,265	5.41
Haveri	84	Haveri (SC)	Neharu Olekar	BJP	86,565	50.74	Rudrappa Lamani	INC	75,261	44.12	11,304	6.62
Haveri	85	Byadgi	Ballary V. Rudrappa	BJP	91,721	54.98	S. R. Patil	INC	70,450	42.23	21,271	12.75
Haveri	86	Hirekerur	B. C. Patil	INC	72,461	48.10	U. B. Banakar	BJP	71,906	47.73	555	0.37
Haveri	87	Ranibennur	R. Shankar	KPJP	63,910	35.64	K. B. Koliwad	INC	59,572	33.22	4,338	2.42
Vijayanagara	88	Hadagalli (SC)	P. T. Parameshwar Naik	INC	54,097	38.65	Odo Gangappa	IND	44,919	32.09	9,178	6.56
Vijayanagara	89	Hagaribommanahalli (SC)	L. B. P. Bheema Naik	INC	78,337	44.46	K. Nemiraj Naik	BJP	71,105	40.36	7,232	4.10
Vijayanagara	90	Vijayanagara	Anand Singh	INC	83,214	50.09	H. R. Gaviyappa	BJP	74,986	45.14	8,228	4.95
Ballary	91	Kampli (ST)	J. N. Ganesh	INC	80,592	48.62	T. H. Suresh Babu	BJP	75,037	45.27	5,555	3.35
Ballary	92	Siruguppa (ST)	M. S. Somalingappa	BJP	82,546	54.25	B. Murali Krishna	INC	61,275	40.27	21,271	13.98
Ballary	93	Bellary (ST)	B. Nagendra	INC	79,186	48.54	Sanna Pakirappa	BJP	76,507	46.90	2,679	1.64
Ballary	94	Bellary City	G. Somashekara Reddy	BJP	76,589	50.63	Anil Lad	INC	60,434	39.95	16,155	10.68
Ballary	95	Sandur (ST)	E. Tukaram	INC	78,106	49.53	D. Raghavendra Manju	BJP	64,096	40.64	14,010	8.89
Vijayanagara	96	Kudligi (ST)	N. Y. Gopalakrishna	BJP	50,085	32.93	N. T. Bommanna	JD(S)	39,272	25.82	10,813	7.11
Chitradurga	97	Molakalmuru (ST)	B. Sriramulu	BJP	84,018	43.63	Dr. B. Yogesh Babu	INC	41,973	21.80	42,045	21.83
Chitradurga	98	Challakere (ST)	T. Raghumurthy	INC	72,874	43.12	Raveesh Kumar	JD(S)	59,335	35.11	13,539	8.01
Chitradurga	99	Chitradurga	G. H. Thippareddy	BJP	82,896	43.78	K. C. Veerendra Puppy	JD(S)	49,911	26.36	32,985	17.42
Chitradurga	100	Hiriyur	Poornima Krishnappa	BJP	77,733	41.17	D. Sudhakar	INC	64,858	34.36	12,875	6.81
Chitradurga	101	Hosadurga	Gulihatti D. Shekar	BJP	90,562	56.66	B. G. Govindappa	INC	64,570	40.40	25,992	16.26
Chitradurga	102	Holalkere (SC)	M. Chandrappa	BJP	1,07,976	57.29	H. Anjaneya	INC	69,036	36.63	38,940	20.66
Devangere	103	Jagalur (ST)	S. V. Ramachandra	BJP	78,948	53.22	H. P. Rajesh	INC	49,727	33.52	29,221	19.70
Vijayanagara	104	Harapanahalli	G. Karunakara Reddy	BJP	67,603	40.14	M. P. Ravindra	INC	57,956	34.41	9,647	5.73
Devangere	105	Harihar	S. Ramappa	INC	64,801	39.29	B. P. Harish	BJP	57,541	34.89	7,260	4.40
Devangere	106	Davanagere North	S. A. Ravindranath	BJP	76,540	48.65	S. S. Mallikarjun	INC	72,469	46.06	4,071	2.59
Devangere	107	Davanagere South	Shamanuru Shivashankarappa	INC	71,369	52.45	Yashavantha Rao Jadhav	BJP	55,485	40.78	15,884	11.67
Devangere	108	Mayakonda (SC)	N. Linganna	BJP	50,556	32.58	K. S. Basavanthappa	INC	44,098	28.42	6,458	4.16
Devangere	109	Channagiri	K. Madalu Virupakshappa	BJP	73,794	46.68	Vadnal Rajanna	INC	48,014	30.37	25,780	16.31
Devangere	110	Honnali	M. P. Renukacharya	BJP	80,624	49.81	D. G. Shanthana Gowda	INC	76,391	47.19	4,233	2.62
Shimoga	111	Shimoga Rural (SC)	K. B. Ashok Naik	BJP	69,326	40.25	Sharada Puryanaik	JD(S)	65,549	38.06	3,777	2.19
Shimoga	112	Bhadravati	B. K. Sangameshwara	INC	75,722	49.53	M. J. Appaji Gowda	JD(S)	64,155	41.97	11,567	7.56
Shimoga	113	Shimoga	K. S. Eshwarappa	BJP	1,04,027	60.36	K. B. Prasanna Kumar	INC	57,920	33.61	46,107	26.75
Shimoga	114	Tirthahalli	Araga Jnanendra	BJP	67,527	43.03	Kimmane Rathnakar	INC	45,572	29.04	21,955	13.99
Shimoga	115	Shikaripura	B. S. Yediyurappa	BJP	86,983	56.16	Goni Malatesha	INC	51,586	33.31	35,397	22.85
Shimoga	116	Sorab	Kumar Bangarappa	BJP	72,091	46.15	Madhu Bangarappa	JD(S)	58,805	37.65	13,286	8.50
Shimoga	117	Sagar	Hartalu Halappa	BJP	78,475	50.65	Kagodu Thimmappa	INC	70,436	45.46	8,039	5.19
Udupi	118	Byndoor	B. M. Sukumar Shetty	BJP	96,029	54.34	K. Gopala Poojary	INC	71,636	40.54	24,393	13.80
Udupi	119	Kundapura	Halady Srinivas Shetty	BJP	1,03,434	65.20	Rakesh Malli	INC	47,029	29.64	56,405	35.56
Udupi	120	Udupi	K. Raghupati Bhat	BJP	84,946	52.31	Pramod Madhwaraj	INC	72,902	44.89	12,044	7.42
Udupi	121	Kapu	Lalaji Mendon	BJP	75,893	52.54	Vinay Kumar Sorake	INC	63,976	44.29	11,917	8.25
Udupi	122	Karkal	V. Sunil Kumar	BJP	91,245	62.52	H. Gopal Bhandary	INC	48,679	33.36	42,566	29.16
Chikmagalur	123	Sringeri	T. D. Rajegowda	INC	62,780	45.81	D. N. Jeevaraj	BJP	60,791	44.36	1,989	1.45
Chikmagalur	124	Mudigere (SC)	M. P. Kumaraswamy	BJP	58,783	44.76	C. Motamma	INC	46,271	35.24	12,512	9.52
Chikmagalur	125	Chikmagalur	C. T. Ravi	BJP	70,863	43.98	B. L. Shankar	INC	44,549	27.65	26,314	16.33
Chikmagalur	126	Tarikere	D. S. Suresh	BJP	44,940	30.04	G. H. Srinivasa	IND	33,253	22.23	11,687	7.81
Chikmagalur	127	Kadur	K. S. Prakash	BJP	62,232	38.97	Y. S. V. Datta	JD(S)	46,860	29.34	15,372	9.63
Tumakuru	128	Chiknayakanhalli	J. C. Madhu Swamy	BJP	69,612	38.53	C. B. Suresh Babu	JD(S)	59,335	32.84	10,277	5.69
Tumakuru	129	Tiptur	B. C. Nagesh	BJP	61,383	40.50	K. Shadakshari	INC	35,820	23.63	25,563	16.87
Tumakuru	130	Turuvekere	A. S. Jayaram	BJP	60,710	39.54	M. T. Krishnappa	JD(S)	58,661	38.21	2,049	1.33
Tumakuru	131	Kunigal	H. D. Ranganath	INC	58,697	36.25	D. Krishna Kumar	BJP	53,097	32.79	5,600	3.46
Tumakuru	132	Tumkur City	G. B. Jyothi Ganesh	BJP	60,421	35.57	N. Govindaraju	JD(S)	55,128	32.45	5,293	3.12
Tumakuru	133	Tumkur Rural	D. C. Gowri Shankar	JD(S)	82,740	48.01	B. Suresh Gowda	BJP	77,100	44.74	5,640	3.27
Tumakuru	134	Koratagere (SC)	G. Parameshwara	INC	81,598	47.64	P. R. Sudhakara Lal	JD(S)	73,979	43.19	7,619	4.45
Tumakuru	135	Gubbi	S. R. Srinivas	JD(S)	55,572	35.76	G. N. Bettaswamy	BJP	46,491	29.91	9,081	5.85
Tumakuru	136	Sira	B. Sathyanarayana	JD(S)	74,338	41.24	T. B. Jayachandra	INC	63,973	35.49	10,365	5.75
Tumakuru	137	Pavagada (SC)	Venkataramanappa	INC	72,974	44.79	K. M. Thimmarayappa	JD(S)	72,565	44.54	409	0.25
Tumakuru	138	Madhugiri	M. V. Veerabhadraiah	JD(S)	88,521	53.31	K. N. Rajanna	INC	69,947	42.12	18,574	11.19
Chikkaballapura	139	Gauribidanur	N. H. Shivashankara Reddy	INC	69,000	40.91	C. R. Narasimhamurthy	JD(S)	59,832	35.47	9,168	5.44
Chikkaballapura	140	Bagepalli	S. N. Subbareddy	INC	65,710	39.94	G. V. Sreeramareddy	CPI(M)	51,697	31.42	14,013	8.52
Chikkaballapura	141	Chikkaballapur	K. Sudhakar	INC	82,006	47.27	K. P. Bachegowda	JD(S)	51,575	29.73	30,431	17.54
Chikkaballapura	142	Sidlaghatta	V. Muniyappa	INC	76,240	44.76	B. N. Ravikumar	JD(S)	66,531	39.06	9,709	5.70
Chikkaballapura	143	Chintamani	J. K. Krishna Reddy	JD(S)	87,753	48.55	M. C. Sudhakar	BPJP	82,513	45.65	5,240	2.90
Kolar	144	Srinivaspur	K. R. Ramesh Kumar	INC	93,571	50.71	G. K. Venkatashivareddy	JD(S)	83,019	44.99	10,552	5.72
Kolar	145	Mulbagal (SC)	H. Nagesh	IND	74,213	45.12	Samruddhi Manjunath	JD(S)	67,498	41.03	6,715	4.09
Kolar	146	Kolar Gold Field (SC)	M. Roopakala	INC	71,151	50.98	Ashwini Sampangi	BJP	30,324	21.73	40,827	29.25
Kolar	147	Bangarapet (SC)	S. N. Narayanaswamy	INC	71,171	45.29	M. Mallesh Babu	JD(S)	49,300	31.37	21,871	13.92
Kolar	148	Kolar	K. Srinivasa Gowda	JD(S)	82,788	46.22	Syed Zameer Pasha	INC	38,537	21.52	44,251	24.70
Kolar	149	Malur	K. Y. Nanjegowda	INC	75,677	46.90	K. S. Manjunath Gowda	JD(S)	57,762	35.80	17,915	11.10
Bangalore Urban	150	Yelahanka	S. R. Vishwanath	BJP	1,20,110	49.00	A. M. Hanumanthegowda	JD(S)	77,607	31.66	42,503	17.34
Bangalore Urban	151	K. R. Pura	Byrati Basavaraj	INC	1,35,404	53.31	N. S. Nandiesha Reddy	BJP	1,02,675	40.42	32,729	12.89
Bangalore Urban	152	Byatarayanapura	Krishna Byre Gowda	INC	1,14,964	45.31	A. Ravi	BJP	1,09,293	43.08	5,671	2.23
Bangalore Urban	153	Yeshvanthapura	S. T. Somashekhar	INC	1,15,273	40.14	T. N. Javarayi Gowda	JD(S)	1,04,562	36.41	10,711	3.73
Bangalore Urban	154	Rajarajeshwarinagar	Munirathna	INC	1,08,065	42.14	P. Muniraju Gowda	BJP	82,573	32.20	25,492	9.94
Bangalore Urban	155	Dasarahalli	R. Manjunatha	JD(S)	94,044	43.48	S. Muniraju	BJP	83,369	38.55	10,675	4.93
Bangalore Urban	156	Mahalakshmi Layout	K. Gopalaiah	JD(S)	88,218	55.18	N. L. Narendra Babu	BJP	47,118	29.47	41,100	25.71
Bangalore Urban	157	Malleshwaram	C. N. Ashwath Narayan	BJP	83,130	67.22	Kengal Shreepada Renu	INC	29,130	23.56	54,000	43.66
Bangalore Urban	158	Hebbal	Byrathi Suresh	INC	74,453	50.76	Y. A. Narayanaswamy	BJP	53,313	36.34	21,140	14.42
Bangalore Urban	159	Pulakeshinagar (SC)	Akhanda Srinivas Murthy	INC	97,574	77.18	B. Prasanna Kumar	JD(S)	15,948	12.61	81,626	64.57
Bangalore Urban	160	Sarvagnanagar	K. J. George	INC	1,09,955	61.74	M. N. Reddy	BJP	56,651	31.81	53,304	29.93
Bangalore Urban	161	C. V. Raman Nagar (SC)	S. Raghu	BJP	58,887	44.61	R. Sampath Raj	INC	46,660	35.35	12,227	9.26
Bangalore Urban	162	Shivajinagar	R. Roshan Baig	INC	59,742	55.04	Katta Subramanya Naidu	BJP	44,702	41.19	15,040	13.85
Bangalore Urban	163	Shanti Nagar	N. A. Haris	INC	60,009	49.42	K. Vasudevamurthy	BJP	41,804	34.43	18,205	14.99
Bangalore Urban	164	Gandhi Nagar	Dinesh Gundu Rao	INC	47,354	37.34	A. R. Sapthagiri Gowda	BJP	37,284	29.40	10,070	7.94
Bangalore Urban	165	Rajaji Nagar	S. Suresh Kumar	BJP	56,271	46.86	G. Padmavathi	INC	46,818	38.99	9,453	7.87
Bangalore Urban	166	Govindraj Nagar	V. Somanna	BJP	79,135	50.33	Priya Krishna	INC	67,760	43.10	11,375	7.23
Bangalore Urban	167	Vijay Nagar	M. Krishnappa	INC	73,353	46.90	H. Ravindra	BJP	70,578	45.13	2,775	1.77
Bangalore Urban	168	Chamrajpet	B. Z. Zameer Ahmed Khan	INC	65,339	54.35	M Lakshminarayana	BJP	32,202	26.79	33,137	27.56
Bangalore Urban	169	Chickpet	Uday Garudachar	BJP	57,312	44.46	R. V. Devraj	INC	49,378	38.30	7,934	6.16
Bangalore Urban	170	Basavanagudi	L. A. Ravi Subramanya	BJP	76,018	58.46	K. Bagegowda	JD(S)	38,009	29.23	38,009	29.23
Bangalore Urban	171	Padmanaba Nagar	R. Ashoka	BJP	77,868	48.18	V. K. Gopal	JD(S)	45,702	28.28	32,166	19.90
Bangalore Urban	172	B.T.M. Layout	Ramalinga Reddy	INC	67,085	49.35	Lallesh Reddy	BJP	46,607	34.29	20,478	15.06
Bangalore Urban	173	Jayanagar	Sowmya Reddy	INC	54,458	49.18	B. N. Prahlad	BJP	51,571	46.57	2,887	2.61
Bangalore Urban	174	Mahadevapura (SC)	Arvind Limbavali	BJP	1,41,682	49.83	A. C. Srinivasa	INC	1,23,898	43.57	17,784	6.26
Bangalore Urban	175	Bommanahalli	M. Satish Reddy	BJP	1,11,863	57.22	Sushma Rajagopala Reddy	INC	64,701	33.09	47,162	24.13
Bangalore Urban	176	Bangalore South	M. Krishnappa	BJP	1,52,427	47.74	R. K. Ramesh	INC	1,22,068	38.24	30,359	9.50
Bangalore Urban	177	Anekal (SC)	B. Shivanna	INC	1,13,894	50.02	A. Narayanaswamy	BJP	1,05,267	46.24	8,627	3.78
Bangalore Rural	178	Hosakote	M. T. B. Nagaraj	INC	98,824	51.19	Sharath Kumar Bache Gowda	BJP	91,227	47.25	7,597	3.94
Bangalore Rural	179	Devanahalli (SC)	L. N. Narayanaswamy	JD(S)	86,966	50.81	Venkataswamy	INC	69,956	40.87	17,010	9.94
Bangalore Rural	180	Doddaballapur	T. Venkataramanaiah	INC	73,225	43.39	B. Munegowda	JD(S)	63,280	37.50	9,945	5.89
Bangalore Rural	181	Nelamangala (SC)	K. Sreenivasamurthy	JD(S)	69,277	42.91	R. Narayanaswamy	INC	44,956	27.85	24,321	15.06
Ramanagara	182	Magadi	A. Manjunath	JD(S)	1,19,492	61.52	H. C. Balakrishna	INC	68,067	35.05	51,425	26.47
Ramanagara	183	Ramanagaram	H. D. Kumaraswamy	JD(S)	92,626	53.96	H. A. Iqbal Hussain	INC	69,990	40.77	22,636	13.19
Ramanagara	184	Kanakapura	D. K. Shivakumar	INC	1,27,552	68.52	Narayana Gowda	JD(S)	47,643	25.59	79,909	42.93
Ramanagara	185	Channapatna	H. D. Kumaraswamy	JD(S)	87,995	46.55	C. P. Yogeshwara	BJP	66,465	35.16	21,530	11.39
Mandya	186	Malavalli (SC)	K. Annadani	JD(S)	1,03,038	52.93	P. M. Narendraswamy	INC	76,278	39.18	26,760	13.75
Mandya	187	Maddur	D. C. Thammanna	JD(S)	1,09,239	63.48	Madhu G. Madegowda	INC	55,209	32.08	54,030	31.40
Mandya	188	Melukote	C. S. Puttaraju	JD(S)	96,003	54.87	Darshan Puttannaiah	SA	73,779	42.17	22,224	12.70
Mandya	189	Mandya	M. Srinivas	JD(S)	69,421	41.99	P. Ravikumar	INC	47,813	28.92	21,608	13.07
Mandya	190	Shrirangapattana	Ravindra Srikantaiah	JD(S)	1,01,307	57.35	Ramesha Bandisiddegowda	INC	57,619	32.62	43,688	24.73
Mandya	191	Nagamangala	Suresh Gowda	JD(S)	1,12,396	61.94	N. Chaluvaraya Swamy	INC	64,729	35.67	47,667	26.27
Mandya	192	Krishnarajapete	Narayana Gowda	JD(S)	88,016	50.58	K. B. Chandrashekar	INC	70,897	40.74	17,119	9.84
Hassan	193	Shravanabelagola	C. N. Balakrishna	JD(S)	1,05,516	63.08	C. S. Puttegowda	INC	52,504	31.39	53,012	31.69
Hassan	194	Arsikere	K. L. Shivalinge Gowda	JD(S)	93,986	54.34	G. B. Shashidhara	INC	50,297	29.08	43,689	25.26
Hassan	195	Belur	K. S. Lingesha	JD(S)	64,268	42.20	H. K. Suresh	BJP	44,578	29.27	19,690	12.93
Hassan	196	Hassan	Preetham J. Gowda	BJP	63,348	41.02	H. S. Prakash	JD(S)	50,342	32.60	13,006	8.42
Hassan	197	Holenarasipur	H. D. Revanna	JD(S)	1,08,541	60.13	B. P. Manjegowda	INC	64,709	35.85	43,832	24.28
Hassan	198	Arkalgud	A. T. Ramaswamy	JD(S)	85,064	45.03	A. Manju	INC	74,411	39.39	10,653	5.64
Hassan	199	Sakleshpur (SC)	H. K. Kumaraswamy	JD(S)	62,262	38.67	Somashekar Jayaraj	BJP	57,320	35.60	4,942	3.07
Dakshina Kannada	200	Belthangady	Harish Poonja	BJP	98,417	54.81	K. Vasantha Bangera	INC	75,443	42.02	22,974	12.79
Dakshina Kannada	201	Moodabidri	Umanatha Kotian	BJP	87,444	57.44	Abhayachandra Jain	INC	57,645	37.86	29,799	19.58
Dakshina Kannada	202	Mangalore City North	Y. Bharath Shetty	BJP	98,648	56.02	Mohiuddin Bava	INC	72,000	40.88	26,648	15.14
Dakshina Kannada	203	Mangalore City South	D. Vedavyas Kamath	BJP	86,545	52.97	John Richard Lobo	INC	70,470	43.13	16,075	9.84
Dakshina Kannada	204	Mangalore	U. T. Khader	INC	80,813	54.11	Santhosh Kumar Rai Boliyaru	BJP	61,074	40.89	19,739	13.22
Dakshina Kannada	205	Bantval	U. Rajesh Naik	BJP	97,802	53.57	Ramanath Rai	INC	81,831	44.83	15,971	8.74
Dakshina Kannada	206	Puttur	Sanjeeva Matandoor	BJP	90,073	54.17	Shakunthala T. Shetty	INC	70,596	42.46	19,477	11.71
Dakshina Kannada	207	Sullia (SC)	S. Angara	BJP	95,205	56.53	Dr. B. Raghu	INC	69,137	41.05	26,068	15.48
Kodagu	208	Madikeri	Appachu Ranjan	BJP	70,631	41.68	B. A. Jivijaya	JD(S)	54,616	32.23	16,015	9.45
Kodagu	209	Virajpet	K. G. Bopaiah	BJP	77,944	49.40	C. S. Arun Machaiah	INC	64,591	40.94	13,353	8.46
Mysore	210	Periyapatna	K. Mahadeva	JD(S)	77,770	49.94	K. Venkatesh	INC	70,277	45.13	7,493	4.81
Mysore	211	Krishnarajanagara	S. R. Mahesh	JD(S)	85,011	48.57	D. Ravishankar	INC	83,232	47.56	1,779	1.01
Mysore	212	Hunasuru	Adagur H. Vishwanath	JD(S)	91,667	49.22	H. P. Manjunath	INC	83,092	44.62	8,575	4.60
Mysore	213	Heggadadevankote (ST)	Anil Chikkamadhu	INC	76,652	44.81	Chikkanna	JD(S)	54,559	31.90	22,093	12.91
Mysore	214	Nanjangud (SC)	B. Harshavardhan	BJP	78,030	47.59	Kalale N. Keshavamurthy	INC	65,551	39.98	12,479	7.61
Mysore	215	Chamundeshwari	G. T. Devegowda	JD(S)	1,21,325	53.62	Siddaramaiah	INC	85,283	37.69	36,042	15.93
Mysore	216	Krishnaraja	S. A. Ramadas	BJP	78,573	53.48	M. K. Somashekar	INC	52,226	35.55	26,347	17.93
Mysore	217	Chamaraja	L. Nagendra	BJP	51,683	36.77	Vasu	INC	36,747	26.14	14,936	10.63
Mysore	218	Narasimharaja	Tanveer Sait	INC	62,268	38.46	Sandesh Swamy	BJP	44,141	27.27	18,127	11.19
Mysore	219	Varuna	Yathindra Siddaramaiah	INC	96,435	55.09	T. Basavaraju	BJP	37,819	21.60	58,616	33.49
Mysore	220	T. Narasipur (SC)	M. Ashvin Kumar	JD(S)	83,929	54.05	H. C. Mahadevappa	INC	55,451	35.71	28,478	18.34
Chamarajanagar	221	Hanur	R. Narendra	INC	60,444	35.49	Dr. Preethan Nagappa	BJP	56,931	33.42	3,513	2.07
Chamarajanagar	222	Kollegal (SC)	N. Mahesh	BSP	71,792	42.51	A. R. Krishnamurthy	INC	52,338	30.99	19,454	11.52
Chamarajanagar	223	Chamarajanagar	C. Puttarangashetty	INC	75,963	45.46	K. R. Mallikarjunappa	BJP	71,050	42.52	4,913	2.94
Chamarajanagar	224	Gundlupet	C. S. Niranjan Kumar	BJP	94,151	51.48	M. C. Mohan Kumari	INC	77,467	42.35	16,684	9.13

=== By-election ===
#	Reason	Date	Constituency		MLA before election		MLA after election	
#	Reason	Date	#	Name	Candidate	Party	Candidate	Party
1	(Note: Jamkhandi Assembly seat became vacant due to the death of Congress MLA Siddu Nyamagouda in a road accident on 28 May 2018. His son, Anand Nyamagouda, contested and won the by-election on behalf of the Congress.)	6-Nov-2018	21	Jamkhandi	Siddu Nyamagouda	INC	Anand Nyamagouda	INC
2	(Note: Ramanagara Assembly seat fell vacant when Chief Minister H. D. Kumaraswamy (Janata Dal (Secular)) resigned from the assembly after winning the Chennapatna constituency in the May 2018 state elections. Kumaraswamy’s wife, Anitha Kumaraswamy, contested and won the by-election for the JD(S).)	6-Nov-2018	183	Ramanagara	H. D. Kumaraswamy	JD(S)	Anitha Kumaraswamy	JD(S)
3	(Note: Kundgol seat fell vacant following the death of C.S. Shivalli, a Congress minister and MLA, in March 2019. His wife, Kusumavati Shivalli, contested the by-election on a Congress ticket.)	23-Apr-2019	70	Kundgol	C. S. Shivalli	INC	Kusuma Shivalli	INC
4	(Note: Chincholi seat fell vacant after Umesh Jadhav resigned as the Congress MLA and joined the BJP to contest the Lok Sabha polls from the Kalaburagi (Gulbarga) parliamentary constituency. His son, Avinash Jadhav, contested the assembly by-election on a BJP ticket.)	23-Apr-2019	42	Chincholi	Umesh Jadhav	INC	Avinash Jadhav	BJP
5	(Note: The by-elections for 15 Karnataka assembly constituencies were held on 5 December 2019 to fill vacancies created by the disqualification of 17 rebel MLAs from the Congress and JD(S) parties, whose defection caused the collapse of the H D Kumaraswamy-led coalition government. Originally scheduled for 21 October 2019, the Election Commission deferred the polls following a Supreme Court judgment on 13 November 2019. The Court upheld the disqualification of the MLAs but ruled that they were eligible to contest the by-elections, prompting the BJP to field 13 of the disqualified legislators as its candidates. The results were subsequently declared on 9 December 2019, with the BJP retaining power by winning 12 of the 15 seats.)	5-Dec-2019	3	Athani	Mahesh Kumathalli	INC	Mahesh Kumathalli	BJP
6		5-Dec-2019	4	Kagwad	Shrimant Patil	INC	Shrimant Patil	BJP
7		5-Dec-2019	9	Gokak	Ramesh Jarkiholi	INC	Ramesh Jarkiholi	BJP
8		5-Dec-2019	81	Yellapur	Shivaram Hebbar	INC	Shivaram Hebbar	BJP
9		5-Dec-2019	86	Hirekerur	B. C. Patil	INC	B. C. Patil	BJP
10		5-Dec-2019	90	Vijayanagara	Anand Singh	INC	Anand Singh	BJP
11		5-Dec-2019	141	Chikkaballapur	Dr. K. Sudhakar	INC	Dr. K. Sudhakar	BJP
12		5-Dec-2019	151	K.R. Puram	Byrati Basavaraj	INC	Byrati Basavaraj	BJP
13		5-Dec-2019	153	Yeshvanthapura	S. T. Somashekhar	INC	S. T. Somashekhar	BJP
14		5-Dec-2019	87	Ranibennur	R. Shankar	INC	Arunkumar Guththur	BJP
15		5-Dec-2019	156	Mahalakshmi Layout	K. Gopalaiah	JD(S)	K. Gopalaiah	BJP
16		5-Dec-2019	192	Krishnarajpete	Narayana Gowda	JD(S)	Narayana Gowda	BJP
17		5-Dec-2019	212	Hunsur	A. H. Vishwanath	JD(S)	H. P. Manjunath	INC
18		5-Dec-2019	162	Shivajinagar	R. Roshan Baig	INC	Rizwan Arshad	INC
19		5-Dec-2019	178	Hosakote	M. T. B. Nagaraj	INC	Sharath Bache Gowda	IND
20	(Note: Sira seat became vacant following the death of the sitting JD(S) legislator B. Sathyanarayana in August 2020.)	3-Nov-2020	136	Sira	B Sathyanarayana	JD(S)	Rajesh Gowda	BJP
21	(Note: Rajarajeshwari Nagar (RR Nagar) seat fell vacant due to the disqualification of the then Congress MLA N. Munirathna under the anti-defection law after he resigned from the assembly.)	3-Nov-2020	154	R. R. Nagar	Munirathna	INC	Munirathna	BJP
22	(Note: Basavakalyan seat became vacant following the death of the incumbent Congress MLA, B Narayan Rao, who succumbed to COVID-19 in September 2020.)	17-Apr-2021	47	Basavakalyan	B. Narayan Rao	INC	Sharanu Salagar	BJP
23	(Note: Maski seat was declared vacant due to the disqualification of the sitting Congress MLA, Prathapagouda Patil, who had resigned from the Assembly and joined the BJP in 2019.)	17-Apr-2021	59	Maski	Pratapgouda Patil	INC	Basangouda Turvihal	INC
24	(Note: The Sindagi and Hangal assembly by-elections were held on October 30, 2021, to fill vacant seats necessitated by the deaths of the respective sitting legislators, M. C. Managuli (JD(S)) and C. M. Udasi (BJP). M. C. Managuli, the JD(S) MLA for Sindgi, passed away in January 2021 and C. M. Udasi, the BJP MLA for Hangal, passed away in June 2021.)	30-Oct-2021	33	Sindagi	Mallappa Managuli	JD(S)	Ramesh Bhusanur	BJP
25	(Note: The Sindagi and Hangal assembly by-elections were held on October 30, 2021, to fill vacant seats necessitated by the deaths of the respective sitting legislators, M. C. Managuli (JD(S)) and C. M. Udasi (BJP). M. C. Managuli, the JD(S) MLA for Sindgi, passed away in January 2021 and C. M. Udasi, the BJP MLA for Hangal, passed away in June 2021.)	30-Oct-2021	82	Hangal	C. M. Udasi	BJP	Srinivas Mane	INC

== Government formation ==
=== Hung assembly ===
The election led to a hung assembly, with the BJP emerging as the single largest party, with 104 seats and the Congress winning the popular vote. BJP, under the leadership of Yediyurappa, formed the government, based on being the single largest party of the house, despite the Congress and JD(S) post-result alliance having a majority. The governor then gave a 15-day window for the new government to prove the majority in the legislature, which was shunned by the opposition as favoring the BJP. The Supreme Court limited the window to three days, and then Chief minister Yeddyurappa resigned 10 minutes before the trust vote. The INC-JD(S) coalition then formed the cabinet with HD Kumarasamy as Chief minister. This coalition government lasted for 14 months before turmoil started again. 16 Legislators from the ruling coalition resigned within a span of two days, and two independent MLAs switched their support to BJP. This shrunk the house majority to 105 and ruling coalition to 101, and the opposition BJP to 107. After three weeks of turmoil, HD Kumarasamy lost the trust vote by 100–107 in the house (held on 23 July 2019) and resigned. Afterward on 26 July 2019, B.S. Yeddiyurapa took the oath as the chief minister of Karnataka once again.

== Bypolls ==
Bypolls were due to be held in three seats: Jayanagar and Rajarajeshwari Nagar in Bangalore and in Ramanagaram.

Rajarajeshwari Nagar election results were declared on 31 May 2018, and INC candidate Munirathna won by a margin of 28,000 votes taking the Congress' tally to 79 seats and the JD(S)-INC coalition to 118 seats.

Jayanagar Assembly Election result was declared on 13 June 2018. Sowmya Reddy, daughter of former minister Ramalinga Reddy, won the constituency by defeating BJP's BN Prahlad by 2889 votes. 55% polling was recorded in the Jayanagar Assembly constituency on 11 June. The assembly elections were held across the state on 12 May, but the poll in Jayanagar was countermanded following the death of BJP candidate B N Vijayakumar, who was holding the seat. The JDS had earlier pulled out its candidate, formally supporting its coalition partner Congress. This win took the Congress' tally to 79 in the 224 seats assembly and the INC-JD(S) coalition to 118 seats.

The elected Congress MLA for Jamkhandi died in a road accident on 28 May 2018.

The results of Jamkhandi and Ramanagaram were declared on 5 November 2018. In Jamkhandi, INC (JD(S)-Congress coalition) candidate Ananda nyamagouda (son of ex MLA Siddu nyamagouda) won by a margin of 39479 votes, taking Congress' tally to 80 seats.

In Ramanagaram, (JD(S)-Congress coalition) candidate Anitha Kumaraswamy (wife of Karnataka Chief Minister HD Kumaraswamy) won by a margin of 109137 votes. The Congress-JD(S) coalition took 120 seats.

=== Bypolls in 2019 ===
After the death of Kundagol MLA C.S. Shivalli and resignation of Chincholi MLA Umesh Jadhav for Karnataka Assembly, the bypolls of Karnataka Assembly were held on 19 May along with Parliamentary election. Out of two seats, Kundagol seat was won by Kusuma Shivalli (wife of the late C.S. Shivalli) from Indian National Congress and Avinash Jadhav from BJP won Chincholi Legislative Assembly seat (son of BJP MP Umesh Jadhav)

== See also ==
- Elections in India
- 2018 elections in India
- 2019 Karnataka resignation crisis
- 2019 Karnataka Legislative Assembly by-elections
