= Allamprabhu Patil =

Indian politician (born 1956)

Allamprabhu Patil (born 5 December 1956) is an Indian politician from Karnataka. He is a member of the Karnataka Legislative Assembly representing the Indian National Congress from Gulbarga Dakshin Assembly constituency in Kalaburagi district. He was elected in the 2023 Karnataka Legislative Assembly election.

== Early life ==
Patil hails from Kalaburagi, Kalaburagi district, Karnataka. His father Sharanappa Gouda Patil was a farmer. He completed his graduation in arts at SB College of Arts, Kalaburagi in the year 1979.

== Career ==
Patil contested the 2018 Karnataka Legislative Assembly Election and lost to the BJP candidate Dattatraya C. Patil Revoor by a margin of 5,431 votes. After some delay, the Congress announced Patil as its candidate from Gulbarga Dakshin. He faced tough competition from former Minister Revu Naik Belamagi and Vijaykumar G Ramakrishna, the son of another former Minister G. Ramakrishna. He was elected in the 2023 Karnataka Legislative Assembly election representing Indian National Congress and defeated his nearest rival and the same candidate, Dattatraya C. Patil Revoor of the Bharatiya Janata Party, by a margin of 21,048 votes.

In September 2024, he demanded a cabinet meeting in Kalaburagi to discuss the setting up of a Bhima River Tribunal to resolve the water disputes with the neighbouring Maharashtra which is affecting about 155 villages in his constituency. He alleged Maharashtra has not been fair in releasing water through the Ujani dam to Bhima river to serve these areas in the state. He also demanded Rs.100 crore from the government for the development of Kalaburagi.
