= Aralimatti =

Aralimatti ಬಸವ ಭೂಮಿ
- Village
- Nickname: ಸಕ್ಕರೆ ನಾಡು
- Country: India
- State: Karnataka
- District: Belagavi
- Talukas: Mudalagi

Languages
  - Official: Kannada
- Time zone: UTC+5:30 (IST)

Aralimatti is a village in Belagavi district in the southern state of Karnataka, India.
