= Belgaum Uttar Assembly constituency =

Legislative Assembly constituency in Karnataka, India

Coordinates: 15.90°N 74.52°E

Belgaum Uttar
- Constituency No. 11 for the Karnataka Legislative Assembly

Constituency details
- Country: India
- Region: South India
- State: Karnataka
- District: Belagavi
- Lok Sabha constituency: Belagavi
- Established: 2008
- Total electors: 2,51,578
- Reservation: None

Member of Legislative Assembly
- 16th Karnataka Legislative Assembly
- Incumbent Asif Sait
- Party: Indian National Congress
- Elected year: 2023
- Preceded by: Anil S Benake

Belgaum Uttar (North Belgaum) Assembly constituency is one of the seats in Karnataka Legislative Assembly in India. It is a segment of Belgaum Lok Sabha constituency. The seat came into existence when the assembly map was redrawn in 2008. Prior to that most of its area was under the now-defunct Uchagaon Assembly constituency.

== Members of Assembly ==
Year	Name	Party
1967-2008: See Belgaum, Uchagaon and Hire Bagewadi
2008	Firoz Nuruddin Sait	Indian National Congress
2013	Firoz Nuruddin Sait	Indian National Congress
2018	Anil S. Benake	Bharatiya Janata Party
2023	Asif Sait	Indian National Congress

== Election results ==
=== 2023 ===
2023 Karnataka Legislative Assembly election: Belgaum Uttar
Party	Candidate	Votes	%	±%
INC	Asif Sait	69,184	46.28	+4.37
BJP	Ravi. B. Patil	64,953	43.45	−10.18
Independent	Amar Kisan Yallurakar	11,743	7.86	
NOTA	None of the Above	1,161	0.78	−0.14
Majority		4,231	2.83	−8.89
Turnout		1,49,478		
INC gain from BJP		Swing		

=== 2018 ===
2018 Karnataka Legislative Assembly election: Belgaum Uttar
Party	Candidate	Votes	%	±%
BJP	Anil S Benake	79,060	53.63	
INC	Fairoz Nuruddin Saith	61,793	41.91	
Independent	Balasaheb Shivajirav Kakatkar	1,869	1.27	
NOTA	None of the Above	1,361	0.92	
Majority		17,267	11.72	
Turnout		1,47,426	62.71	
BJP gain from INC		Swing		

=== 2013 ===
- Fairoz Nuruddin Saith (INC): 45,125 votes
- Renu Suhas Killekar (IND/MES): 26,915 votes

=== 2008 ===
- Fairoz Nuruddin Saith (INC): 37,527 votes
- Shankargouda I Patil (BJP): 34,154 votes

== See also ==
- Belagavi district
- List of constituencies of Karnataka Legislative Assembly
