= Munyal =

- Village
- Country: India
- State: Karnataka
- District: Belagavi
- Talukas: Mudalgi

Languages
  - Official: Kannada
- Time zone: UTC+5:30 (IST)

Munyal is a village in Mudalgi Talluk I.e. Belagavi district of Karnataka, India.
