= Bhimappa Gadad =

Bhimappa Gundappa Gadad is an RTI (Right To Information) activist and a small agriculturist who hails from Mudalgi town of Mudalagi taluk in Belgaum district. He has been a whistleblower in many cases such as uncovering the amount of money spent on Prime minister Narendra Modi's foreign visits and also he exposed the arrears owed by politicians to government due to their over stay at government Bungalow as well as he was instrumental in making Karnataka Government admit that Yellur, Belgaum belongs to Karnataka.

He contested 2018 Karnataka Legislative Assembly election from Janata Dal (Secular) from Arabhavi (Vidhan Sabha constituency) and was defeated against Bharatiya Janata Party candidate Balachandra Jarkiholi with a margin of 47,328 votes.

== Notable works ==
- He exposed the fact that over 355 crores of taxpayer money was spent on Prime Minister Narendra Modi's foreign trips in 48 months of his office stay.
- He was instrumental in making Karnataka Government admit that Yellur, Belgaum village comes under its territory in Belgaum district through his Public interest litigation at Karnataka high court when no Karnataka Government's arms gave no reply to his RTI's. Finally, it laid to the demolition of Maharashtra state sign board on July 25, 2014.
- He exposed the fact that a total of 198 lakh rupees of taxpayer money was spent on room furnishings and renovation of the circuit house at Belgaum during the visit of former president Pranab Mukherjee where the president spent just an hour.
