= Basanagouda Turvihal =

Indian politician (born 1965)

Basanagouda Turvihal (born 1965) is an Indian politician from Karnataka. He is a member of the Karnataka Legislative Assembly from Maski Assembly constituency which is reserved for ST community in Raichur district representing Indian National Congress. He won the 2023 Karnataka Legislative Assembly election.

He was appointed chairman for Khadi and Village Industries Board on 26 January 2024.

== Early life and education ==
Turvihal is from Maski, Raichur district Karnataka. His father Somalingappa is a farmer. He studied SSLC at Sri Vasavi High School, Sindhanur.

== Career ==
Turvihal won from Maski Assembly constituency representing Indian National Congress in the 2023 Karnataka Legislative Assembly election. He polled 79,566 votes and defeated his nearest rival, Pratapagouda Patil of Bharatiya Janata Party, by a margin of 13,053 votes. Turvihal lost the 2018 Karntaka Legislative Assembly election on Bharatiya Janata Party ticket to Pratapgouda Patil of Congress, by a slender margin of 200 votes. Later he joined Indian National Congress while his opponent switched to BJP. However, Turvihal won the 2021 Karnataka Legislative Assembly by election defeating the same opponent, Patil. Then, he retained the seat in the 2023 election.
