= Pratapagouda Patil =

Indian politician (born 1955)

Member of Karnataka Legislative Assembly
- In office 2008–2021
- Preceded by: New Constituency Established
- Succeeded by: Basanagouda Turvihal
- Constituency: Maski

Personal details
- Born: 1 October 1955 (age 70) Maski, Karnataka, India
- Party: Bharatiya Janata Party (May 2021–present)
- Other political affiliations: Indian National Congress (until May 2021)

Pratap Gowda Patil is an Indian politician from Karnataka. He was elected three times (hat trick) to the Karnataka Legislative Assembly from Maski Assembly constituency. He last won the 2018 Karnataka Legislative Assembly election as a member of the Indian National Congress and later shifted to Bharatiya Janata Party but lost the bye election in 2021 and the 2023 Karnataka Legislative Assembly election.
