= Gulbarga Dakshin Assembly constituency =

Legislative Assembly constituency in Karnataka, India

Coordinates: 17.31°N 76.82°E

Gulbarga Dakshin
- Constituency No. 44 for the Karnataka Legislative Assembly

Constituency details
- Country: India
- Region: South India
- State: Karnataka
- District: Kalaburagi
- Lok Sabha constituency: Gulbarga
- Established: 2008
- Total electors: 279,251
- Reservation: None

Member of Legislative Assembly
- 16th Karnataka Legislative Assembly
- Incumbent Allamprabhu Patil
- Party: Indian National Congress
- Elected year: 2023

Gulbarga Dakshin Assembly constituency is one of the seats in Karnataka state assembly in India, established in 2008. It is part of Gulbarga Lok Sabha constituency.

== Members of the Legislative Assembly ==
Election	Member	Party
2008	Chandrashekhar Patil Revoor	Bharatiya Janata Party
2010 By-election	Aruna C. Patil Revoor	Janata Dal
2013	Dattatraya C. Patil Revoor	Bharatiya Janata Party
2018	Dattatraya C. Patil Revoor	Bharatiya Janata Party
2023	Allamprabhu Patil	Indian National Congress

== Election results ==
=== Assembly Election 2023 ===
2023 Karnataka Legislative Assembly election : Gulbarga Dakshin
Party	Candidate	Votes	%	±%
INC	Allamprabhu Patil	87,345	54.74	▲13.62
BJP	Dattatraya C. Patil Revoor	66,297	41.55	▼3.33
JD(S)	Krishna Reddy	1,409	0.88	▼9.07
NOTA	None of the above	1,284	0.80	▲0.03
Independent	Sharanabasappa. Pappa	1,050	0.66	New
Margin of victory		21,048	13.19	▲9.43
Turnout		159,789	57.22	▲2.42
Total valid votes		159,567		
Registered electors		279,251		▲5.91
INC gain from BJP		Swing	▲9.86	

=== Assembly Election 2018 ===
2018 Karnataka Legislative Assembly election : Gulbarga Dakshin
Party	Candidate	Votes	%	±%
BJP	Dattatraya C. Patil Revoor	64,788	44.88	▲9.73
INC	Allamprabhu Patil	59,357	41.12	▲20.06
JD(S)	Basavaraj Diggavi	14,359	9.95	▼15.69
BSP	Suryakant Nimbalkar	1,853	1.28	▼0.10
NOTA	None of the above	1,114	0.77	New
Margin of victory		5,431	3.76	▼5.75
Turnout		144,480	54.80	▼1.14
Total valid votes		144,362		
Registered electors		263,662		▲24.37
BJP hold		Swing	▲9.73	

=== Assembly Election 2013 ===
2013 Karnataka Legislative Assembly election : Gulbarga Dakshin
Party	Candidate	Votes	%	±%
BJP	Dattatraya C. Patil Revoor	36,850	35.15	▲4.04
JD(S)	Shashil. G. Namoshi	26,880	25.64	▼8.53
INC	Kailash Veerendra Patil	22,074	21.06	▼9.77
KJP	S. K. Kanta	22,065	21.05	New
BSP	Vasudev Rao Bheemrao	1,444	1.38	New
Independent	Poojari Dharmaveer. S. Pattan	708	0.68	New
Margin of victory		9,970	9.51	▲6.45
Turnout		118,588	55.94	▲1.06
Total valid votes		104,839		
Registered electors		212,000		▲0.83
BJP gain from JD(S)		Swing	▲0.98	

=== Assembly By-election 2010 ===
2010 Karnataka Legislative Assembly by-election : Gulbarga Dakshin
Party	Candidate	Votes	%	±%
JD(S)	Aruna C. Patil Revoor	39,430	34.17	▲20.10
BJP	S. G. Namoshi	35,898	31.11	▼14.90
INC	A. Dharamasingh	35,567	30.83	▼0.69
Independent	V. Dorepalli	1,282	1.11	New
Independent	S. M. S. Hussaini	950	0.82	New
Margin of victory		3,532	3.06	▼11.43
Turnout		115,378	54.88	▲3.98
Total valid votes		115,378		
Registered electors		210,255		▲8.27
JD(S) gain from BJP		Swing	▼11.84	

=== Assembly Election 2008 ===
2008 Karnataka Legislative Assembly election : Gulbarga Dakshin
Party	Candidate	Votes	%	±%
BJP	Chandrashekhar Patil Revoor	45,380	46.01	New
INC	Basawaraj Bhimalli	31,090	31.52	New
JD(S)	S. K. Kanta	13,876	14.07	New
BSP	Gulam Rabbani	3,467	3.52	New
Independent	Sayyad Sajjad Ali	1,630	1.65	New
Rashtriya Hindustan Sena Karnataka	Ambaray Mahamuni	656	0.67	New
Margin of victory		14,290	14.49	
Turnout		98,845	50.90	
Total valid votes		98,634		
Registered electors		194,199		
BJP win (new seat)				

== See also ==
- List of constituencies of Karnataka Legislative Assembly
