= Devanand Fulasing Chavan =

Indian politician

Member of Karnataka Legislative Assembly
- In office 2018–2023
- Preceded by: Raju Alagur
- Succeeded by: Katakadond Vittal Dondiba
- Constituency: Nagthan

Personal details
- Born: 1 June 1970 (age 56)
- Party: Janata Dal (Secular)
- Occupation: Politician

Devanand Fulasing Chavan is a leader of Janata Dal (Secular) and he was a member of the Karnataka Legislative Assembly 2018 elected from Nagthan Assembly constituency.

== Positions held ==
- Member of Karnataka Legislative Assembly - 2018.
