= Asif Sait =

Indian politician

Member of the Karnataka Legislative Assembly
- Incumbent
- Assumed office 2023
- Preceded by: Anil S Benake
- Constituency: Belgaum Uttar

Personal details
- Born: 1959, Belagavi
- Party: Indian National Congress
- Education: PUC
- Alma mater: Gogte College Of Commerce
- Occupation: Business

Asif Sait is an Indian politician from Karnataka who is a member of the Karnataka Legislative Assembly, representing the Belgaum Uttar as a member of the Indian National Congress.
