= P. Muniraju Gowda =

Indian politician

Muniraju Gowda P M
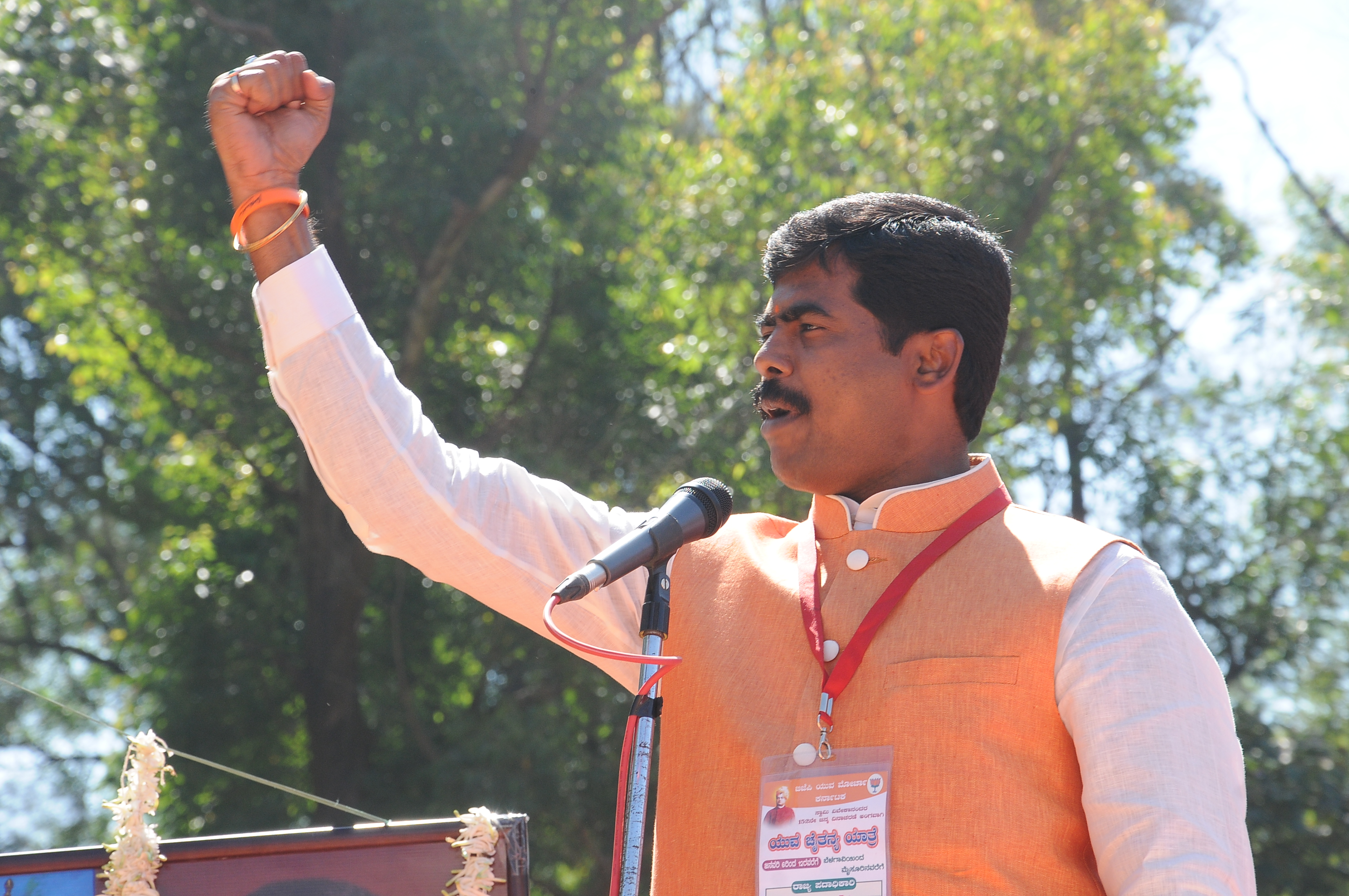

Member of Karnataka Legislative Council
- In office 17 March 2021 – 17 June 2024
- Preceded by: S. L. Dharmegowda
- Succeeded by: Marutirao Muley
- Constituency: elected by Legislative Assembly members

Personal details
- Born: 3 October 1978 (age 48) Bangalore
- Party: Bharatiya Janata Party
- Occupation: Politician

Muniraju Gowda P M (born 3 October 1978) is the current Member of Legislative Council (MLC) and State Secretary of BJP Karnataka. He was ex-state president of BJP Yuva Morcha Karnataka in Karnataka. Muniraju was a leader of Bharatiya Janata Party. He has served the party with various responsibilities such as Vice-President and General Secretary of BJP Yuva Morcha Karnataka in Karnataka. He was the youngest candidate in Karnataka to contest the Parliamentary elections in 2014.

== Early life and career ==
Muniraju Gowda P M was born on 3 October 1978. Hailing from an agricultural background, Muniraju always envisioned providing quality education for rural children. He was inspired by many people such as Chandrashekhar Azad and Swami Vivekananda. He started an organisation called "Vivekananda Yuva Vedika" to encourage meritorious students to study in the under-developed places of the state.

As a youth, he became a volunteer at RSS. He joined the BJP party and worked at various levels, eventually becoming General Secretary of the BJYM. In that role, he organised and monitored various mandal meetings building youngsters organisationally across 14 mandals. He was also the founder and president of Vivekanada Yuva Vedika – an organisation to encourage education and for building morale among the youth. Later, as vice president, he collaborated with the "Jana Chetana Yatra" prabhandhak led by Sri L. K. Advani, ex Deputy Prime Minister of India, across 21 states and 12,000 km for 40 days across India. He conducted various yathres like Rasthriya Suraksha Yathre, Tiranga Yathre, Jana Sangarsha Andolana Padayatre and contested BBMP elections. He represented the BJP in the 2014 Indian General Election to the Lok Sabha from the Bangalore Rural constituency.

== Education ==
Holds Degree in Master of Arts "POLITICAL SCIENCE"

Year of examination Oct./Nov. 2016

Date of convocation 2 Dec. 2017

== As State President of BJP Yuva Morcha ==
As the President of BJYM, he toured all 36 organisational districts and contested the parliamentary elections from Bengaluru Rural Constituency. He started Shashwatha Neerigagi horata – Padayatra to address the water crisis in rural Bengaluru areas. Yuva Chaitanya Yatre – Rathayatra from Belgavi to Mysuru calling for action against narcotics in Karnataka. He organised protests against corruption and inefficiency in the Karnataka state government. He also conducted over 100 bike rallies and torch-light marches. He also plays a major role in the further development and initiations of various campaigns like Gorata.

== State Secretary ==
On 25 May 2016, he was appointed the State Secretary of Bharatiya Janata Party of Karnataka. He is currently serving as State Secretary of BJP for the 2nd term.

=== 1st term as State Secretary ===
During his first term he oversaw the call center operations across Karnataka during 2019 parliamentary elections.

=== 2nd term as State Secretary ===
Currently he is serving as State secretary for 2nd term. He travelled across many districts of Karnataka during Gram panchayat elections to polarize voters for BJP supported candidates. He organized Gramaswarajya rallies for the same.

BJP had organized Janasevaka yatra to felicitate Grama Panchayat members. Muniraju was given the responsibility to organize the rally in many districts including the Validictory event held at Belagavi which was attended by Union Home Ministier Shri. Amit Shah ji.

== Rajarajeshwarinagar Assembly Candidate ==
Muniraju, was given opportunity to contest 2018 assembly elections from Rajarajeshwarinagar assembly constituency. He had the popularity across constituency. He was instrumental in unearthing faking voter id racket in the constituency. The Congress candidate used malpractice in printing voter id cards, collecting id's illegally. Thousands of voter id's were seized by election commission and the elections were countermanded. A case is still running in the high court of Karnataka.
