= Nagthan Assembly constituency =

Constituency of the Karnataka legislative assembly in India

Coordinates: 16.93°N 75.84°E

Nagthan
- Constituency No. 31 for the Karnataka Legislative Assembly

Constituency details
- Country: India
- Region: South India
- State: Karnataka
- District: Bijapur
- Lok Sabha constituency: Bijapur
- Total electors: 269,309
- Reservation: SC

Member of Legislative Assembly
- 16th Karnataka Legislative Assembly
- Incumbent Katakadond Vittal Dondiba
- Party: Indian National Congress
- Elected year: 2023

Nagthan Assembly constituency is one of 224 assembly constituencies in Karnataka, in India. It is part of Bijapur Lok Sabha constituency.

== Members of the Legislative Assembly ==
Election	Member	Party
2008	Katakadond Vittal Dondiba	Bharatiya Janata Party
2013	Raju Alagur	Indian National Congress
2018	Devanand Fulasing Chavan	Janata Dal
2023	Katakadond Vittal Dondiba	Indian National Congress

== Election results ==
=== Assembly Election 2023 ===
2023 Karnataka Legislative Assembly election : Nagthan
Party	Candidate	Votes	%	±%
INC	Katakadond Vittal Dondiba	78,990	43.75%	▲12.94
BJP	Sanjeev Malasiddappa Aihole	48,175	26.68%	▼3.82
JD(S)	Devanand Fulasing Chavan	34,114	18.90%	▼15.10
KRPP	Bandi Shrikant Hanamantappa	10,770	5.97%	New
AAP	Guru Munnu Chavan	2,974	1.65%	New
NOTA	None of the above	1,016	0.56%	▼0.34
Margin of victory		30,815	17.07%	▲13.88
Turnout		180,933	67.18%	▼0.44
Total valid votes		180,540		
Registered electors		269,309		▲3.40
INC gain from JD(S)		Swing	▲9.75	

=== Assembly Election 2018 ===
2018 Karnataka Legislative Assembly election : Nagthan
Party	Candidate	Votes	%	±%
JD(S)	Devanand Fulasing Chavan	59,709	34.00%	▲1.64
INC	Katakadond Vittal Dondiba	54,108	30.81%	▼2.03
BJP	Gopal Govind Karjol	53,562	30.50%	▲19.24
Bhaarateeya Janashakthi Congress	Irasur Sagar Mallappa	1,624	0.92%	New
NOTA	None of the above	1,578	0.90%	New
Independent	Rahul Tippanna Bhaskar	1,276	0.73%	New
Margin of victory		5,601	3.19%	▲2.71
Turnout		176,110	67.62%	▲5.44
Total valid votes		175,608		
Registered electors		260,452		▲15.42
JD(S) gain from INC		Swing	▲1.16	

=== Assembly Election 2013 ===
2013 Karnataka Legislative Assembly election : Nagthan
Party	Candidate	Votes	%	±%
INC	Raju Alagur	45,570	32.84%	▼0.88
JD(S)	Devanand Fulasing Chavan	44,903	32.36%	▲11.93
KJP	Katakdhonda Vitthal Dhondiba	24,104	17.37%	New
BJP	Nagendra Devendrappa Mayavanshi	15,627	11.26%	▼26.40
Independent	Katakdhond Deepak Gangaram	1,521	1.10%	New
Independent	Sanjeev Pundlik Mane	1,278	0.92%	New
BSP	Sudhakar Kanamadi	1,260	0.91%	▼0.92
Independent	Nirmala Shrinivas Arakeri	1,212	0.87%	New
Independent	Parimala Mahadev Kambale	1,141	0.82%	New
Margin of victory		667	0.48%	▼3.46
Turnout		140,312	62.18%	▲6.64
Total valid votes		138,775		
Registered electors		225,647		▲17.30
INC gain from BJP		Swing	▼4.82	

=== Assembly Election 2008 ===
2008 Karnataka Legislative Assembly election : Nagthan
Party	Candidate	Votes	%	±%
BJP	Katakadond Vittal Dondiba	40,225	37.66%	New
INC	H. R. Algur (Raju)	36,018	33.72%	New
JD(S)	R. K. Rathod	21,815	20.43%	New
Independent	Harijan Ambanna Tukaram	2,677	2.51%	New
BSP	Dodamani Basavant Shivappa	1,956	1.83%	New
JD(U)	Rathod Thavarasingh Ramasingh	1,725	1.62%	New
Independent	P. M. Harale	1,015	0.95%	New
Independent	Shridhar S. Waghamore	790	0.74%	New
Margin of victory		4,207	3.94%	
Turnout		106,832	55.54%	
Total valid votes		106,805		
Registered electors		192,368		
BJP win (new seat)				

== See also ==
- List of constituencies of the Karnataka Legislative Assembly
