= Hagaribommanahalli Assembly constituency =

Legislative Assembly constituency in Karnataka State, India

Coordinates: 15.05°N 76.21°E

Hagaribommanahalli
- Constituency No. 89 for the Karnataka Legislative Assembly

Constituency details
- Country: India
- Region: South India
- State: Karnataka
- District: Ballari / Vijayanagara
- Lok Sabha constituency: Bellary
- Established: 2008
- Total electors: 230,042
- Reservation: SC

Member of Legislative Assembly
- 16th Karnataka Legislative Assembly
- Incumbent K. Nemiraj Naik
- Party: JD(S)
- Alliance: NDA
- Preceded by: L. B. P. Bheema Naik

Hagaribommanahalli Assembly constituency is one of the 224 Legislative Assembly constituencies of Karnataka in India.

It is part of Ballari district, and is reserved for candidates of the Scheduled Castes. K. Nemiraj Naik is the current MLA of Hagaribommanahalli Assembly constituency.

== Members of the Legislative Assembly ==
Election	Member	Party
2008	K. Nemiraj Naik	Bharatiya Janata Party
2013	L. B. P. Bheema Naik	Janata Dal
2018	L. B. P. Bheema Naik	Indian National Congress
2023	K. Nemiraj Naik	Janata Dal

== Election results ==
=== Assembly Election 2023 ===
2023 Karnataka Legislative Assembly election : Hagaribommanahalli
Party	Candidate	Votes	%	±%
JD(S)	K. Nemiraj Naik	84,023	44.44	▲41.55
INC	L. B. P. Bheema Naik	72,679	38.44	▼6.02
BJP	Ramanna. B	27,026	14.29	▼26.07
AAP	Dr. V. H. Hanumanthappa	1,622	0.86	New
NOTA	None of the above	846	0.45	▼0.31
Margin of victory		11,344	6.00	▲1.90
Turnout		190,454	82.79	▲2.97
Total valid votes		189,065		
Registered electors		230,042		▲3.99
JD(S) gain from INC		Swing	▼0.02	

=== Assembly Election 2018 ===
2018 Karnataka Legislative Assembly election : Hagaribommanahalli
Party	Candidate	Votes	%	±%
INC	L. B. P. Bheema Naik	78,337	44.46	▲25.33
BJP	K. Nemiraj Naik	71,105	40.36	▼1.21
Independent	Parameshwara. L	17,058	9.68	New
JD(S)	S. Krushna Naik	5,100	2.89	▼38.78
CPI(M)	B. Malamma	1,493	0.85	New
NOTA	None of the above	1,345	0.76	New
Margin of victory		7,232	4.10	▲4.00
Turnout		176,564	79.82	▲1.58
Total valid votes		176,196		
Registered electors		221,213		▲19.48
INC gain from JD(S)		Swing	▲2.79	

=== Assembly Election 2013 ===
2013 Karnataka Legislative Assembly election : Hagaribommanahalli
Party	Candidate	Votes	%	±%
JD(S)	L. B. P. Bheema Naik	51,972	41.67	▲20.75
BJP	K. Nemiraj Naik	51,847	41.57	▼3.28
INC	Marenna. L	23,860	19.13	▼1.40
KJP	Dodda Ramanna	5,836	4.68	New
BSRCP	Ekambresh Naik	2,555	2.05	New
Independent	Mohan Dasari	1,963	1.57	New
Independent	Ravikumar. V	1,522	1.22	New
Independent	Manasvi	1,071	0.86	New
BSP	Nagaraja. V	1,017	0.82	▼6.50
Margin of victory		125	0.10	▼23.82
Turnout		144,866	78.24	▲8.07
Total valid votes		124,713		
Registered electors		185,145		▲13.82
JD(S) gain from BJP		Swing	▼3.18	

=== Assembly Election 2008 ===
2008 Karnataka Legislative Assembly election : Hagaribommanahalli
Party	Candidate	Votes	%	±%
BJP	K. Nemiraj Naik	51,156	44.85	New
JD(S)	L. B. P. Bheema Naik	23,865	20.92	New
INC	Hegdal Ramanna	23,414	20.53	New
BSP	Mundrigi Nagaraja	8,345	7.32	New
Independent	M. Rama Swamy	2,316	2.03	New
Independent	M. D. Basappa	1,538	1.35	New
LJP	H. Yerriswamy	1,111	0.97	New
Independent	K. R. Ravi Kumar	886	0.78	New
JD(U)	L. C. Meetya Naik	765	0.67	New
Margin of victory		27,291	23.92	
Turnout		114,149	70.17	
Total valid votes		114,072		
Registered electors		162,671		
BJP win (new seat)				

== See also ==
- List of constituencies of the Karnataka Legislative Assembly
- Vijayanagara district
