= Maski Assembly constituency =

Legislative Assembly constituency in Karnataka State, India

Coordinates: 15.96°N 76.66°E

Maski
- Constituency No. 59 for the Karnataka Legislative Assembly

Constituency details
- Country: India
- Region: South India
- State: Karnataka
- District: Raichur
- Lok Sabha constituency: Koppal
- Established: 2008
- Total electors: 211,183
- Reservation: ST

Member of Legislative Assembly
- 16th Karnataka Legislative Assembly
- Incumbent Basanagouda Turvihal
- Party: Indian National Congress
- Elected year: 2023

Maski Assembly constituency is one of the 224 Legislative Assembly constituencies of Karnataka in India.

It is part of Raichur district and is reserved for candidates belonging to the Scheduled Tribes. Basanagouda Turvihal is the current MLA from Maski.

== Members of the Legislative Assembly ==
Election	Member	Party
2008	Pratapagouda Patil	Bharatiya Janata Party
2013	Pratapagouda Patil	Indian National Congress
2018	Pratapagouda Patil	Indian National Congress
2021 By-election (Note: Disqualified by the Hon'ble Speaker under the 10th Schedule of the Constitution with effect from 28/07/2019)	Basanagouda Turvihal	Indian National Congress
2023	Basanagouda Turvihal	Indian National Congress

== Election results ==
=== Assembly Election 2023 ===
2023 Karnataka Legislative Assembly election : Maski
Party	Candidate	Votes	%	±%
INC	Basanagouda Turvihal	79,566	52.76%	▼6.95
BJP	Pratapagouda Patil	66,513	44.11%	▲5.57
JD(S)	Raghavendra Nayak Balganur	1,906	1.26%	New
NOTA	None of the above	1,295	0.86%	▲0.12
Margin of victory		13,053	8.66%	▼12.51
Turnout		150,964	71.48%	▲1.02
Total valid votes		150,798		
Registered electors		211,183		▲2.30
INC hold		Swing	▼6.95	

=== Assembly By-election 2021 ===
2021 Karnataka Legislative Assembly by-election : Maski
Party	Candidate	Votes	%	±%
INC	Basanagouda Turvihal	86,337	59.71%	▲15.54
BJP	Pratapagouda Patil	55,731	38.54%	▼5.47
NOTA	None of the above	1,075	0.74%	▼0.76
KRS	B. T. Obaleshappa Nayaka	962	0.67%	New
Margin of victory		30,606	21.17%	▲21.01
Turnout		145,459	70.46%	▲1.49
Total valid votes		144,588		
Registered electors		206,443		▲4.03
INC hold		Swing	▲15.54	

=== Assembly Election 2018 ===
2018 Karnataka Legislative Assembly election : Maski
Party	Candidate	Votes	%	±%
INC	Pratapagouda Patil	60,387	44.17%	▲11.22
BJP	Basanagouda Turvihal	60,174	44.01%	▲40.93
JD(S)	Rajasomanath Nayak	11,392	8.33%	▲5.81
NOTA	None of the above	2,049	1.50%	New
Independent	Basavanagaud	983	0.72%	New
AIMEP	Babu Nayak	910	0.67%	New
Independent	Amaresh Matur	821	0.60%	New
Margin of victory		213	0.16%	▼13.69
Turnout		136,878	68.97%	▲4.83
Total valid votes		136,716		
Registered electors		198,451		▲20.35
INC hold		Swing	▲11.22	

=== Assembly Election 2013 ===
2013 Karnataka Legislative Assembly election : Maski
Party	Candidate	Votes	%	±%
INC	Pratapagouda Patil	45,552	32.95%	▼0.26
KJP	Mahadevappa Gowda	26,405	19.10%	New
BSRCP	Shekharappa Talwar	18,197	13.16%	New
BJP	Shankarkumara Medara	4,264	3.08%	▼39.18
JD(S)	Amaresh	3,488	2.52%	▼7.84
Independent	R. Rangappa Nayaka	2,877	2.08%	New
Sarva Janata Party	Amaresh Nayak	2,152	1.56%	New
CPI(ML) Red Star	Nagaraj Medar	1,107	0.80%	New
Independent	Tirupati	1,036	0.75%	New
Margin of victory		19,147	13.85%	▲4.81
Turnout		105,759	64.14%	▲10.57
Total valid votes		138,246		
Registered electors		164,897		▲4.49
INC gain from BJP		Swing	▼9.31	

=== Assembly Election 2008 ===
2008 Karnataka Legislative Assembly election : Maski
Party	Candidate	Votes	%	±%
BJP	Pratapagouda Patil	35,711	42.26%	New
INC	Timmappa	28,068	33.21%	New
JD(S)	Ayyana Gouda Ayanur	8,756	10.36%	New
Independent	K. R. Kandgal	3,401	4.02%	New
Independent	Somana Gouda	2,605	3.08%	New
LJP	H. R. Shivakumar	2,110	2.50%	New
BSP	Nagaraj Basappa Chigari	1,595	1.89%	New
Independent	Comrade Sivappa Auukayi	1,222	1.45%	New
Independent	Amaresh Nayak	1,041	1.23%	New
Margin of victory		7,643	9.04%	
Turnout		84,532	53.57%	
Total valid votes		84,509		
Registered electors		157,804		
BJP win (new seat)				

== See also ==
- List of constituencies of the Karnataka Legislative Assembly
- Raichur district
