= Anil S Benake =

Indian politician

Member of the Karnataka Legislative Assembly.
- In office 2018–2023
- Preceded by: Firoz Nuruddin Sait
- Succeeded by: Asif Sait
- Constituency: Belgaum Uttar

Personal details
- Born: Anil S Benake; 13 July 1965 (age 61) Belgaum
- Party: Bharatiya Janata Party
- Education: RL Law College

Anil S Benake is an Indian politician. He is former member of the Karnataka Legislative Assembly who represented Belgaum Uttar. He is a member of the Bhartiya Janata Party.

== History ==
He was born on 13 July 1965 and completed his graduation from RL Law College in 1991.
