= Gorta, Bidar =

Village in Karnataka, India

Coordinates: 17°57′37″N 77°04′28″E

Gorta, also called Gorta (B) is a village located in Bidar district, Karnataka, India. It is located in Hulsur taluk.

== Demography ==
As per 2001 census, Gorta village has a population of 2991 distributed in 577 house holds. The village has post office with pin code 585327.

== Gorta massacre ==
During 1948, during post-independence violence, hundreds of villagers in Gorta village were massacred by Razakars of Hyderabad. The village is also described as Jallianwalabag of Karnataka in view of mass killings witnessed on 9 and 10 May 1948. A stone plaque installed in front of the village gives the date of mass killing as 5 May 1948 and the fight continued for about two weeks. It is estimated that more than 200 people were killed by Razakars, the private army of Nizam of Hyderabad but the exact number of deaths was not recorded by body count. Shri K.M.Munshi, then Agent General of Union Government (of India), who visited the village after the massacre, in his book "End of an Era" (page 131 and 132) puts total deaths figures around 200 and property destruction worth Rs.70 lakhs.

The bitter memories of the massacre are remembered by the women folk of the village by way of songs called Bhulai pada, a semi-folk song. There is a long-standing demand from local people for construction of a memorial at Gorta. Local people and certain political parties have collected Rs.27 lakhs (as of September 2014) with an intention to construct a 35-foot-tall (11 m) memorial in the village, and foundation stone was laid on 17 September 2014 (Hyderabad-Karnataka Liberation day) for the same.
