= R. Narayanaswamy =

- Born: 1956 or 1957
- Education: University of Madras (BCom); University of New South Wales (PhD); Institute of Chartered Accountants of India; Institute of Cost and Works Accountants of India; Institute of Company Secretaries of India
- Occupations: Accountant, academic

R. Narayanaswamy is a retired Indian accountant and educator. He was a Professor of Finance at the Indian Institute of Management Bangalore (IIMB) between 1986 and 2021.

== Education ==
Narayanaswamy received a Bachelor of Commerce from St. Joseph's College, Tiruchirappalli, University of Madras in 1976. He subsequently became a chartered accountant in 1979. He was an Associate Chartered Accountant (ACA) of Institute of Chartered Accountants of India (ICAI), and an Associate Member (AICWA) of Institute of Cost and Works Accountants of India (ICWAI) and the Institute of Company Secretaries of India (ICSI). He obtained his Ph.D. in accounting from University of New South Wales, Sydney in 2002.

== Career ==
Narayanaswamy worked in Steel Authority of India from 1980 to 1984. He joined the Institute of Chartered Accountants of India in 1984 before joining Indian Institute of Management Bangalore as an assistant professor in 1986. In 2006, Business Today listed him as one of the best business school professors in India. He became a Professor in the area of Finance and taught financial accounting and financial statement analysis. He was a visiting fellow at Manchester Business School, United Kingdom and a visiting professor at Osaka University, Japan.

He served as an independent director and chairman of the audit committee of Indian Railway Finance Corporation from 2005 to 2011 and independent director and chairman of the audit committee of Bank of Baroda from 2014 to 2017. He has been part of the Accounting Standards Board (2001–02 and 2009–10), the Auditing and Assurance Standards Board (2008–09 and 2010–11), the Committee on Accounting Standards for Local Bodies of Institute of Chartered Accountants of India (2014–15) and the National Group of the Accounting Standards Board (2011–12). He also served as a Jury member for the ICAI Awards for Excellence in Financial Reporting in 2013–14.

Narayanaswamy served as the chairperson of the committee to advise on valuation matters and a member of the committee of experts to develop an institutional framework for the development of valuation professionals of the Government of India and was appointed Chair of Technical Advisory Committee of National Financial Reporting Authority, Ministry of Corporate Affairs in 2020.

== Bibliography ==
- Narayanaswamy, R (2022). Financial Accounting: A Managerial Perspective. PHI. ISBN 9789354437656.
- Narayanaswamy, R. Financial Reporting Asia Pacific: Financial Reporting in India. Singapore: CCH Asia.
- Narayanaswamy, R. Political Connections and Earnings Quality: Evidence from India. Bangalore: IIM Bangalore. SSRN 2359322.
