= K. Nemiraj Naik =

Indian politician (born 1970)

Member of the Karnataka Legislative Assembly
- Incumbent
- Assumed office 2023
- Preceded by: L. B. P. Bheema Naik
- Constituency: Hagaribommanahalli
- In office 2008–2013
- Preceded by: Constituency Established
- Succeeded by: L. B. P. Bheema Naik
- Constituency: Hagaribommanahalli

Personal details
- Born: 1970 (age 55–56) Hagaribommanahalli, Vijayanagara district, Karnataka, India
- Party: JDS
- Other political affiliations: BJP (till 2023)
- Parent: Kashya Naik (father)
- Education: Magadh University, Patna (B.A)
- Occupation: Politician

K. Nemiraj Naik (born 1970) is an Indian politician from Karnataka. He is an MLA from Hagaribommanahalli Assembly constituency which is reserved for SC community in Ballari district. He won the 2023 Karnataka Legislative Assembly election representing Janata Dal (Secular).

== Early life and education ==
Naik is from Hagaribommanahalli, Ballari district (now Vijayanagara district). His father Kashya Naik is a farmer. He completed his B.A. in 2006 at Magadh University, Patna.

== Career ==
Naik quit Bharatiya Janata party after he was denied a ticket and joined Janata Dal (Secular) before the election. He got the ticket from his new party and won from Hagaribommanahalli Assembly constituency representing Janata Dal (Secular) in the 2023 Karnataka Legislative Assembly election. He polled 84,023 votes and defeated his nearest rival, L. P. B. Bheemanaik of Indian National Congress by a margin of11,344 votes. Earlier, he lost the 2018 Karnataka Legislative Assembly election Bheemanaik of Congress. He became an MLA for the first time winning the 2008 Karnataka Legislative Assembly election on BJP ticket.
