= Katakadond Vittal Dondiba =

Indian politician

Vittal Dhondiba Katakdhond
- ವಿಠ್ಠಲ್ ದೊಂಡಿಬಾ ಕಟಕಧೊಂಡ

Member of the Karnataka Legislative Assembly
- Incumbent
- Assumed office 2023
- Preceded by: Devanand Fulasing Chavan
- Constituency: Nagthan

Member of the Karnataka Legislative Assembly
- In office 2008–2013
- Preceded by: Constituency established
- Succeeded by: Raju Alagur
- Constituency: Nagthan

Personal details
- Born: September 12, 1959 (age 66)
- Party: Indian National Congress
- Education: Bachelor of Commerce (B.Com.)
- Occupation: Politician

Vittal Dhondiba Katakdhond (Kannada: ವಿಠ್ಠಲ್ ದೊಂಡಿಬಾ ಕಟಕಧೊಂಡ; born 12 September 1959) is an Indian politician from the state of Karnataka and a member of the Indian National Congress (INC). He is serving as the Member of the Karnataka Legislative Assembly representing the Nagthan (SC) Assembly constituency in Vijayapura district since 2023.

Katakdhond was first elected to the Karnataka Legislative Assembly in the 2008 Karnataka Legislative Assembly election as a candidate of the Bharatiya Janata Party (BJP), becoming the first MLA of the newly created Nagthan Assembly constituency following the delimitation of constituencies in Karnataka.

He was re-elected from the same constituency in the 2023 Karnataka Legislative Assembly election as an Indian National Congress candidate, defeating Bharatiya Janata Party candidate Sanjeev Malasiddappa Aihole by a margin of 30,815 votes.

== Early life and education ==
Vittal Dhondiba Katakdhond was born on 12 September 1959. He completed his Bachelor of Commerce (B.Com.) degree before entering public life.

== Political career ==
Katakdhond entered public life in 1989 when he was elected as a member of the Indi Municipal Council as an Independent candidate.

Later in 1989, he joined the Bharatiya Janata Party and served as the President of the BJP District Dalit Morcha. In 1990, he was appointed District General Secretary of the BJP, a position he held for twelve consecutive years.

From 2006 to 2009, he served as the District President of the Bharatiya Janata Party.

=== First term as MLA (2008–2013) ===
Following the delimitation of assembly constituencies in Karnataka, the Nagthan (SC) Assembly constituency was created in 2008. Katakdhond contested the inaugural election from the newly formed constituency as the Bharatiya Janata Party candidate and defeated H. R. Algur of the Indian National Congress, becoming the first Member of the Karnataka Legislative Assembly representing Nagthan.

=== 2013 Assembly election ===
In the 2013 Karnataka Legislative Assembly election, Katakdhond contested from Nagthan as a candidate of the Karnataka Janata Party (KJP). He secured 42,017 votes and finished in third place.

=== 2018 Assembly election ===
Katakdhond later returned to the Bharatiya Janata Party and served as its District President from 2016 to 2018. Ahead of the 2018 Karnataka Legislative Assembly election, he was denied the BJP nomination for the Nagthan constituency. He subsequently joined the Indian National Congress and contested the election from Nagthan as the party's candidate.

He secured 54,108 votes and finished as the runner-up, losing to Janata Dal (Secular) candidate Devanand Fulasing Chavan by a margin of 5,601 votes.

=== Second term as MLA (2023–present) ===
In the 2023 Karnataka Legislative Assembly election, Katakdhond contested from Nagthan as the Indian National Congress candidate. He won the election by defeating Bharatiya Janata Party candidate Sanjeev Malasiddappa Aihole by 30,815 votes, securing 78,990 votes.

He currently serves as the Member of the Karnataka Legislative Assembly representing the Nagthan constituency.

== Other positions ==
Apart from his legislative career, Katakdhond has held several political and social positions.

- President, BJP District Dalit Morcha (1989)
- District General Secretary, Bharatiya Janata Party (1990–2002)
- District President, Bharatiya Janata Party (2006–2009)
- District President, Karnataka Janata Party (2013)
- District President, Bharatiya Janata Party (2016–2018)
- Founding Director, Sri Jnanayogi Shivakumar Sugar Factory, Hirebevanur, Indi Taluk
- Honorary President, Vijayapura District 108 Employees Association
- State Honorary President, Karnataka Trimastara Charmakara Parishat (KTCP)

== Electoral performance ==
| Year | Election | Constituency | Party | Votes | Result | Ref. |
|---|---|---|---|---|---|---|
| 2008 | Karnataka Legislative Assembly | Nagthan (SC) | Bharatiya Janata Party | 40,225 | Elected; First MLA of Nagthan constituency | |
| 2013 | Karnataka Legislative Assembly | Nagthan (SC) | Karnataka Janata Party | 42,017 | Third place | |
| 2018 | Karnataka Legislative Assembly | Nagthan (SC) | Indian National Congress | 54,108 | Runner-up | |
| 2023 | Karnataka Legislative Assembly | Nagthan (SC) | Indian National Congress | 78,990 | Elected | |

== See also ==
- Nagthan Assembly constituency
- Karnataka Legislative Assembly
- Indian National Congress
- Bharatiya Janata Party
