= Dattatraya C. Patil Revoor =

Indian politician (born 1983)

MLA Dattatraya Patil Revoor
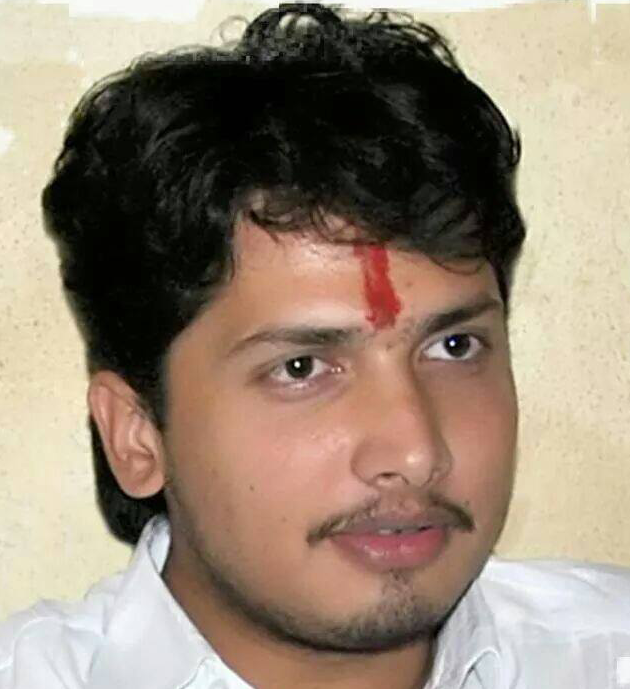

President of Kalyan Karnataka Region Development Board
- In office 2020–2023
- Succeeded by: Dr.Ajay Singh

Member of Karnataka Legislative Assembly
- In office 2013–2023
- Preceded by: Smt Aruna C Patil Revoor
- Succeeded by: Allamprabhu Patil
- Constituency: Gulbarga South

Personal details
- Born: Dattatraya Chandrashekhar Patil; 27 February 1983 (age 43) Kalaburagi
- Party: Bharatiya Janata Party
- Spouse: Laxmi

Dattatraya Chandrashekhar Patil Revoor, also known as Appu Gouda Patil, is an Indian politician and who was the former chairman of Kalyana-Karnataka Region Development Board and Member of Legislative Assembly from Kalaburagi South Constituency from 2013 to 2023. He is also a director of Adaarsh pharmacon company.

== Early life and education ==
Dattatraya C. Patil Revoor was born in Kalaburagi. He is the son of former MLA Chandrashekar Patil Revoor from Gulbarga Dakshin Assembly constituency.

== Positions held ==
- Zilla Panchayat Member, Kalaburagi
- Member Of Legislative Assembly Kalaburagi South (2013)
- National Secretary BJP YUVA MORCHA
- Member Of Legislative Assembly Kalaburagi South (2018)
- Chairman Kalyan Karnataka Regional Development Board (2020)
- 2018
