= Fairoz Nuruddin Saith =

Indian politician

Member of Karnataka Legislative Assembly for Belagavi Uttar
- In office 25 May 2008 – 2018
- Preceded by: Ramesh Kudchi
- Succeeded by: Anil S Benake
- Constituency: Belgaum Uttar

Personal details
- Born: 18 August 1951 (age 74) Amreli
- Party: Indian National Congress
- Spouse: Ruksana Saith
- Children: 1 daughter, 1 son
- Parent(s): Gulbano Saith (mother); Nuruddin Saith (father)
- Education: Bachelor of Science

Fairoz Nuruddin Saith is an Indian Politician and who served as the Member of the Legislative Assembly for the Belgaum Uttar constituency from 2008 to 2018. He is member of the Indian National Congress.

Firoz Sait has been appointed as Karnataka State Tourism Development Corporation Chairman in 2016.
