= Mudalgi =

Mudalgi Mudalagi
- Town
- Location in Karnataka, India
- Coordinates: 16.33°N 74.97°E
- Country: India
- State: Karnataka
- District: Belgaum

Area
  - Total: 13.85 km^{2} (5.35 sq mi)

Population (2011)
  - Total: 41,279
  - Density: 2,387.7/km^{2} (6,184/sq mi)

Languages
  - Official: Kannada
- Time zone: UTC+5:30 (IST)
- PIN: 591 312
- Telephone code: 08334
- ISO 3166 code: IN-KA
- Vehicle registration: KA
- Website: mudalagitown.mrc.gov.in

Mudalgi also spelled as the Mudalagi is a town and Taluk of Belagavi district in the Karnataka, India.

== History ==
The Town Panchayat Council Mudalagi was established in 1949. The government of Mysore awarded the First Prize to the Local Body as the Best "TPC Mudalagi" in the state for the year 1962-63.

Mudalgi was announced taluk based on four commissioned but its not listed by government announcement on 4 September 2017, Mudalgi and nearby village people united and protested for 34 days and demanded the taluk status. On 11 October Chief Minister of Karnataka was approved in cabinet meeting and announced Mudalgi as new talluk in Karnataka.

== Demographics ==
As of 2011 India census, Mudalgi had a population of 41,279. Males constitute 51% of the population and females 49%. Mudalgi has an average literacy rate of 70%, more than the national average of 59.5%: male literacy is 54%, and female literacy is 36%. In Mudalgi, 17% of the population is under 6 years of age.

== Crops ==
Mudalagi is famous as a cattle market in the state of Karnataka. Sugarcane and Maize are the main crop grown. The main water source, the canal Ghataprabha River passes through Mudalagi for 8 months of the year.

== Geography ==
Mudalagi TMC is 90 kilometres (56 mi) from Belgaum district. The TMC has 23 wards and an equal number of Councilors. Mudalagi TMC surrounding area has 13.85 square kilometres (5.35 mi^{2}). The town is 28 kilometres (17 mi) from Gokak and 25 kilometres (16 mi) from Ghataprabha.
