= Tumkur Lok Sabha constituency =

Constituency of the Indian parliament in Karnataka

Coordinates: 13.3°N 77.1°E

Tumkur
- Lok Sabha constituency
- Tumkur Lok Sabha Constituency Map

Constituency details
- Country: India
- Region: South India
- State: Karnataka
- Assembly constituencies: Chiknayakanhalli; Tiptur; Turuvekere; Tumkur City; Tumkur Rural; Koratagere; Gubbi; Madhugiri
- Established: 1951
- Reservation: None

Member of Parliament
- 18th Lok Sabha
- Incumbent V. Somanna
- Party: Bharatiya Janata Party
- Elected year: 2024

Tumkur Lok Sabha constituency is one of the 28 Lok Sabha constituencies in Karnataka state in southern India.

== Assembly segments ==
Tumkur Lok Sabha constituency presently comprises the following eight Legislative Assembly segments:

No	Name	District	Member	Party	Party Leading (in 2024)
128	Chiknayakanhalli	Tumkur	C. B. Suresh Babu	JD(S)	BJP
129	Tiptur	Tumkur	K. Shadakshari	INC	BJP
130	Turuvekere	Tumkur	M. T. Krishnappa	JD(S)	BJP
132	Tumkur City	Tumkur	G. B. Jyothi Ganesh	BJP	BJP
133	Tumkur Rural	Tumkur	B. Suresh Gowda	BJP	BJP
134	Koratagere (SC)	Tumkur	G. Parameshwara	INC	BJP
135	Gubbi	Tumkur	S. R. Srinivas	INC	BJP
138	Madhugiri	Tumkur	K. N. Rajanna	INC	BJP

== Members of Parliament ==
Year	Member	Party
1952	C. R. Basappa	Indian National Congress
1957	M. V. Krishnappa	Indian National Congress
1962	M. V. Krishnappa	Indian National Congress
1962^	Ajit Prasad Jain	Indian National Congress
1965^	Mali Mariyappa	Indian National Congress
1967	K. Lakkappa	Praja Socialist Party
1971	K. Lakkappa	Indian National Congress
1977	K. Lakkappa	Indian National Congress
1980	K. Lakkappa	Indian National Congress
1984	G. S. Basavaraj	Indian National Congress
1989	G. S. Basavaraj	Indian National Congress
1991	S. Mallikarjunaiah	Bharatiya Janata Party
1996	C. N. Bhaskarappa	Janata Dal (Secular)
1998	S. Mallikarjunaiah	Bharatiya Janata Party
1999	G. S. Basavaraj	Indian National Congress
2004	S. Mallikarjunaiah	Bharatiya Janata Party
2009	G. S. Basavaraj	Bharatiya Janata Party
2014	S. P. Muddahanumegowda	Indian National Congress
2019	G. S. Basavaraj	Bharatiya Janata Party
2024	V. Somanna	Bharatiya Janata Party

^ denotes by-poll

== Election results ==
=== 2024 ===
2024 Indian general election: Tumkur
Party	Candidate	Votes	%	±%
BJP	V. Somanna	720,946	55.31	▲7.42
INC	S. P. Muddahanumegowda	5,45,352	41.84	N/A
NOTA	None of the above	6,460	0.50	▼0.33
Majority		1,75,594	13.47	▲12.40
Turnout		13,04,308	78.49	▲1.06
BJP hold		Swing	▲7.24	

=== 2019 ===
2019 Indian general elections: Tumkur
Party	Candidate	Votes	%	±%
BJP	G. S. Basavaraj	596,127	47.89	▲15.59
JD(S)	H. D. Deve Gowda	5,82,788	46.82	▲23.34
CPI	N. Shivanna	17,227	1.38	N/A
NOTA	None of the Above	10,295	0.83	▼0.34
Majority		13,339	1.07	
Turnout		12,45,469	77.43	▲4.86
BJP gain from INC		Swing	▲15.64	

=== 2014 ===
2014 Indian general elections: Tumkur
Party	Candidate	Votes	%	±%
INC	S. P. Muddahanumegowda	429,868	39.03	
BJP	G. S. Basavaraj	3,55,827	32.30	
JD(S)	A. Krishnappa	2,58,683	23.48	
NOTA	None of the Above	12,934	1.17	
Majority		74,041	6.72	
Turnout		11,02,012	72.57	
INC gain from BJP		Swing		

=== 2009 ===
2009 Indian general election: Tumkur
Party	Candidate	Votes	%	±%
BJP	G. S. Basavaraj	331,064	36.79	
JD(S)	S. P. Muddahanumegowda	3,09,619	34.41	
INC	P. Kodandaramaiah	1,77,726	19.75	
SP	Sri Gowrishankara Swamigalu	28,923	3.21	
BSP	Ashok	15,044	1.67	
Independent	C. S. Niranjana	12,853	1.43	
Independent	S. C. Shashibhushan	10,715	1.19	
Independent	Mohamed Khasim	5,219	0.58	
Independent	G. Nagendra	4,713	0.52	
Independent	D. R. Nagaraja	3,908	0.43	
Majority		21,445	2.38	
Turnout				
Swing to BJP from JD(S)		Swing		

=== 2004 ===
2004 Indian general election: Tumkur
Party	Candidate	Votes	%	±%
BJP	S. Mallikarjunaiah	303,016	35.08	
JD(S)	D. L. Jagadeesh	3,00,665	34.81	
INC	G. S. Basavaraj	2,27,701	26.36	
Independent	Pavagada Sreeram	22,120	2.56	
SP	Choudhari Veer Singh	10,241	1.19	
Majority		2,351	0.27	
Turnout		8,63,743		
Swing to BJP from JD(S)		Swing		

=== 1999 ===
1999 Indian general election: Tumkur
Party	Candidate	Votes	%	±%
INC	G. S. Basavaraj	318,922	41.21	
BJP	S. Mallikarjunaiah	2,54,985	32.95	
JD(S)	C. N. Bhaskarappa	1,90,295	24.59	
BSP	V. Nagaraju	9,644	1.25	
Majority		63,937	8.26	
Turnout		8,00,907	73.68	
Swing to INC from BJP		Swing		

=== 1998 ===
1998 Indian general election: Tumkur
Party	Candidate	Votes	%	±%
BJP	S. Mallikarjunaiah	327,312	45.50	
INC	R. Narayana	2,56,125	35.60	
JD	C. N. Bhaskarappa	1,32,663	18.44	
Karnataka Vikas Party	Abdul Sattar	3,271	0.45	
Majority		71,187	9.90	
Turnout		7,28,992	67.45	
Swing to BJP from INC		Swing		

=== 1996 ===
1996 Indian general election: Tumkur
Party	Candidate	Votes	%	±%
JD	C. N. Bhaskarappa	192,228	28.60	
BJP	S. Mallikarjunaiah	1,76,516	26.26	
INC	R. Manjunath	1,51,353	22.52	
SP	Y. K. Ramaiah	1,27,161	18.92	
Independent	14 Independent Candidates	24,897	3.73	
Majority		15,712	2.34	
Turnout				
Swing to JD from BJP		Swing		

=== 1991 ===
1991 Indian general election: Tumkur
Party	Candidate	Votes	%	±%
BJP	S. Mallikarjunaiah	255,186	43.29	
INC	G. S. Basavaraj	2,36,269	40.08	
JP	D. Nagarajaiah	73,587	12.48	
Independent	8 Independent Candidates	24,387	4.15	
Majority		18,917	3.21	
Turnout				
Swing to BJP from INC		Swing		

=== 1989 ===
1989 Indian general election: Tumkur
Party	Candidate	Votes	%	±%
INC	G. S. Basavaraj	376,878	55.91	
JP	Y. K. Ramalah	1,77,740	26.37	
JD	D. T. Mayanna	1,09,673	16.27	
Independent	Nagabhushana R.	4,304	0.64	
Independent	T. R. Renuka Prasad	3,012	0.45	
Independent	T. S. Virupaksha	2,433	0.36	
Majority		1,99,138	29.54	
Turnout		7,05,124	73.22	
Swing to INC from JP		Swing		

=== 1984 ===
1984 Indian general election: Tumkur
Party	Candidate	Votes	%	±%
INC	G. S. Basavaraju	265,249	51.00	
JP	Y. K. Ramaiah	2,34,839	45.15	
Independent	7 Independent Candidates	20,023	3.86	
Majority		30,410	5.85	
Turnout				
Swing to INC from JP		Swing		

=== 1980 ===
1980 Indian general election: Tumkur
Party	Candidate	Votes	%	±%
INC(I)	K. Lakkappa	243,229	55.46	
JP	S. Mallikarjuniah	1,26,168	28.77	
INC(U)	N. Hutchamasthy Gowda	53,285	12.15	
JP(S)	A. V. Hamea Gowda	8,404	1.92	
Independent	K. V. Subramanyaswamy	5,276	1.20	
Independent	Mohan Appasaheb Patil	2,180	0.50	
Majority		1,17,061	26.69	
Turnout		4,51,867	67.87	
Swing to INC(I) from JP		Swing		

=== 1977 ===
1977 Indian general election: Tumkur
Party	Candidate	Votes	%	±%
INC	K. Lakkappa	237,086	57.65	
JP	S. Mallikarjuniah	1,70,269	41.41	
Independent	Abdul Subhan	3,861	0.94	
Majority		66,817	16.24	
Turnout		4,19,806	69.51	
Swing to INC from JP		Swing		

=== 1971 ===
1971 Indian general election: Tumkur
Party	Candidate	Votes	%	±%
INC	K. Lakkappa	240,718	74.48	
INC(O)	M. R. Ramanna	78,939	24.42	
PSP	H. Hanumanthagowda	3,553	1.10	
Majority		1,61,779	50.06	
Turnout		3,30,690	68.06	
Swing to INC from INC(O)		Swing		

=== 1967 ===
1967 Indian general election: Tumkur
Party	Candidate	Votes	%	±%
PSP	K. Lakkappa	115,312	42.90	
INC	C. R. Basappa	1,15,051	42.81	
Independent	V. M. Dao	19,941	7.42	
Independent	K. V. Subramanyaswamy	18,475	6.87	
Majority		261	0.09	
Turnout		2,82,424	63.24	
Swing to PSP from INC		Swing		

=== 1962 ===
1962 Indian general election: Tumkur
Party	Candidate	Votes	%	±%
INC	M. V. Krishnappa	119,617	47.48	
PSP	K. N. Shankaralingappa	70,724	28.07	
Independent	Ramappa	45,040	17.88	
ABJS	K. V. Subramanyaswamy	16,543	6.57	
Majority		48,893	19.41	
Turnout		2,64,046	62.12	
Swing to INC from PSP		Swing		

=== 1957 ===
1957 Indian general election: Tumkur
Party	Candidate	Votes	%	±%
INC	M. V. Krishnappa	116,863	60.18	
PSP	B. P. Gangadharaiah	52,475	27.02	
ABJS	K. V. Subranmanya Swamy	24,863	12.80	
Majority		64,388	33.16	
Turnout		1,94,201	50.84	
Swing to INC from PSP		Swing		

=== 1951 ===
1951 Indian general election: Tumkur
Party	Candidate	Votes	%	±%
INC	C. R. Basappa	116,596	52.17	
Socialist	Kadri Shamanna	47,756	21.37	
KMPP	M. L. Srikantiah	39,052	17.47	
ABJS	K. V. Subramanyaswamy	20,101	8.99	
Majority		68,840	30.80	
Turnout		2,23,505	59.71	
Swing to INC from Socialist		Swing		

== See also ==
- List of constituencies of the Lok Sabha
- Madhugiri Lok Sabha constituency
- Tiptur Lok Sabha constituency
- Tumkur district
