= Tumkur Assembly constituency =

Former Assembly constituency in Karnataka, India

Coordinates: 13.332177°N 77.112713°E

Tumkur
- Former constituency for the Karnataka Legislative Assembly

Constituency details
- Country: India
- Region: South India
- State: Karnataka
- Division: Mysore
- District: Tumkur
- Lok Sabha constituency: Tumkur
- Established: 1951
- Abolished: 2008
- Reservation: None

Tumkur Assembly constituency was one of the constituencies in Karnataka state assembly in India until 2008 when it was split into Tumkur Rural and Tumkur City Assembly constituencies. It was part of Tumkur Lok Sabha constituency.

== Members of the Legislative Assembly ==
Election	Member	Party
1952	M. V. Rama Rao	Indian National Congress
1957	G. N. Puttanna	Praja Socialist Party
1962	G. C. Bhageerathamma	Indian National Congress
1967	B. P. Gangadhar	Praja Socialist Party
1972	K. Abdul Subhan	Indian National Congress
1978	Nazeer Ahmed	Indian National Congress
1980 By-election (Note: Resigned on 26 March 1979)	S. Shafi Ahmed	Indian National Congress
1983	Lakshmi Narasimhaiah	Janata Party
1985	Lakshmi Narasimhaiah	Janata Party
1989	S. Shafi Ahmed	Indian National Congress
1994	Sogadu Shivanna	Bharatiya Janata Party
1999	Sogadu Shivanna	Bharatiya Janata Party
2004	Sogadu Shivanna	Bharatiya Janata Party

== Election results ==
=== Assembly Election 2004 ===
2004 Karnataka Legislative Assembly election : Tumkur
Party	Candidate	Votes	%	±%
BJP	Sogadu Shivanna	59,977	41.53%	▼5.42
INC	S. Shafi Ahmed	51,332	35.54%	▼4.77
JD(S)	Somasekhar. G. S	26,883	18.61%	▲7.25
JP	Rama Murthy (Gowda)	2,132	1.48%	New
Kannada Nadu Party	Sadashivaiah N. (Jyoyhi Sadanna)	1,071	0.74%	New
Margin of victory		8,645	5.99%	▼0.65
Turnout		144,784	60.32%	▼5.27
Total valid votes		144,429		
Registered electors		240,035		▲18.05
BJP hold		Swing	▼5.42	

=== Assembly Election 1999 ===
1999 Karnataka Legislative Assembly election : Tumkur
Party	Candidate	Votes	%	±%
BJP	Sogadu Shivanna	60,699	46.95%	▲15.31
INC	S. Shafi Ahmed	52,111	40.31%	▲16.04
JD(S)	T. N. Krisnnappa	14,686	11.36%	New
Independent	C. H. Maridevaru	1,065	0.82%	New
Margin of victory		8,588	6.64%	▼0.73
Turnout		133,359	65.59%	▼3.37
Total valid votes		129,275		
Rejected ballots		3,911	2.93%	▲1.08
Registered electors		203,327		▲11.37
BJP hold		Swing	▲15.31	

=== Assembly Election 1994 ===
1994 Karnataka Legislative Assembly election : Tumkur
Party	Candidate	Votes	%	±%
BJP	Sogadu Shivanna	39,101	31.64%	▲27.44
INC	S. Shafi Ahmed	29,997	24.27%	▼19.66
JD	Lakshmi Narasimhaiah	27,100	21.93%	▼16.96
Independent	K. N. Rajanna	25,144	20.35%	New
Margin of victory		9,104	7.37%	▲2.33
Turnout		125,910	68.96%	▲4.21
Total valid votes		123,582		
Rejected ballots		2,328	1.85%	▼4.78
Registered electors		182,571		▲8.27
BJP gain from INC		Swing	▼12.29	

=== Assembly Election 1989 ===
1989 Karnataka Legislative Assembly election : Tumkur
Party	Candidate	Votes	%	±%
INC	S. Shafi Ahmed	44,786	43.93%	▲7.73
JD	Lakshmi Narasimhaiah	39,646	38.89%	New
JP	B. Vishveshwaraiah	11,133	10.92%	New
BJP	Giridara Pai	4,286	4.20%	▼1.52
Margin of victory		5,140	5.04%	▼13.16
Turnout		109,179	64.75%	▲2.45
Total valid votes		101,937		
Rejected ballots		7,242	6.63%	▲5.01
Registered electors		168,626		▲39.01
INC gain from JP		Swing	▼10.47	

=== Assembly Election 1985 ===
1985 Karnataka Legislative Assembly election : Tumkur
Party	Candidate	Votes	%	±%
JP	Lakshmi Narasimhaiah	40,440	54.40%	▲0.29
INC	Aliya Begum	26,910	36.20%	▼1.48
BJP	Sogadu Shivanna	4,252	5.72%	New
LKD	B. G. Vijaya Prakash	1,871	2.52%	New
Margin of victory		13,530	18.20%	▲1.78
Turnout		75,571	62.30%	▼5.31
Total valid votes		74,345		
Rejected ballots		1,226	1.62%	▼0.77
Registered electors		121,302		▲24.86
JP hold		Swing	▲0.29	

=== Assembly Election 1983 ===
1983 Karnataka Legislative Assembly election : Tumkur
Party	Candidate	Votes	%	±%
JP	Lakshmi Narasimhaiah	34,689	54.11%	▲22.31
INC	S. Shafi Ahmed	24,159	37.68%	New
Independent	B. P. Gangadhar	3,342	5.21%	New
Independent	I. P. Cheriyan	946	1.48%	New
Independent	Nazeer Baig	654	1.02%	New
Margin of victory		10,530	16.42%	▼19.02
Turnout		65,679	67.61%	
Total valid votes		64,112		
Rejected ballots		1,567	2.39%	
Registered electors		97,150		
JP gain from INC(I)		Swing	▼13.12	

=== Assembly By-election 1980 ===
1980 Karnataka Legislative Assembly by-election : Tumkur
Party	Candidate	Votes	%	±%
INC(I)	S. Shafi Ahmed	32,639	67.23%	▲13.42
JP	Veeranna	15,436	31.80%	▼7.11
Margin of victory		17,203	35.44%	▲20.55
Total valid votes		48,548		
INC(I) hold		Swing	▲13.42	

=== Assembly Election 1978 ===
1978 Karnataka Legislative Assembly election : Tumkur
Party	Candidate	Votes	%	±%
INC(I)	Nazeer Ahmed	34,199	53.81%	New
JP	Mohamed Gaiban Khan	24,733	38.91%	New
INC	Abdul Sudhan. K	1,267	1.99%	▼32.56
Independent	Chikkaveeraiah. V	948	1.49%	New
Independent	Krishnagowda. S. H	780	1.23%	New
Independent	Nazeer Baig	522	0.82%	New
Margin of victory		9,466	14.89%	▲8.66
Turnout		65,013	74.39%	▲21.06
Total valid votes		63,558		
Rejected ballots		1,455	2.24%	▲2.24
Registered electors		87,400		▲35.42
INC(I) gain from INC		Swing	▲19.26	

=== Assembly Election 1972 ===
1972 Mysore State Legislative Assembly election : Tumkur
Party	Candidate	Votes	%	±%
INC	K. Abdul Subhan	11,547	34.55%	▲0.50
ABJS	S. Mallikarjunaiah	9,464	28.32%	New
Independent	S. H. Krishne Gowda	6,531	19.54%	New
INC(O)	T. S. L. Murthy	4,646	13.90%	New
Independent	Mumtaj Ahmed	557	1.67%	New
Independent	S. Ramaiah	542	1.62%	New
Margin of victory		2,083	6.23%	▼4.81
Turnout		34,420	53.33%	▲5.91
Total valid votes		33,421		
Registered electors		64,542		▲20.19
INC gain from PSP		Swing	▼10.54	

=== Assembly Election 1967 ===
1967 Mysore State Legislative Assembly election : Tumkur
Party	Candidate	Votes	%	±%
PSP	B. P. Gangadhar	10,509	45.09%	▲36.22
INC	G. C. Bhageerathamma	7,936	34.05%	▼14.58
Independent	K. Mallanna	4,861	20.86%	New
Margin of victory		2,573	11.04%	▼2.61
Turnout		25,468	47.42%	▼11.83
Total valid votes		23,306		
Registered electors		53,702		▼5.79
PSP gain from INC		Swing	▼3.54	

=== Assembly Election 1962 ===
1962 Mysore State Legislative Assembly election : Tumkur
Party	Candidate	Votes	%	±%
INC	G. C. Bhageerathamma	15,178	48.63%	▲4.26
Independent	T. S. Mallikarjunaiah	10,919	34.99%	New
PSP	G. N. Puttanna	2,769	8.87%	▼41.07
ABJS	S. Mallikarjunaiah	1,488	4.77%	New
Independent	R. S. Siddaramaiah	855	2.74%	New
Margin of victory		4,259	13.65%	▲8.07
Turnout		33,771	59.25%	▲0.95
Total valid votes		31,209		
Registered electors		57,001		▲18.07
INC gain from PSP		Swing	▼1.31	

=== Assembly Election 1957 ===
1957 Mysore State Legislative Assembly election : Tumkur
Party	Candidate	Votes	%	±%
PSP	G. N. Puttanna	14,055	49.94%	New
INC	M. V. Rama Rao	12,486	44.37%	▼9.01
CPI	T. L. Thimmappa	1,602	5.69%	New
Margin of victory		1,569	5.58%	▼28.05
Turnout		28,143	58.30%	▼0.72
Total valid votes		28,143		
Registered electors		48,276		▲13.23
PSP gain from INC		Swing	▼3.44	

=== Assembly Election 1952 ===
1952 Mysore State Legislative Assembly election : Tumkur
Party	Candidate	Votes	%	±%
INC	M. V. Rama Rao	13,434	53.38%	New
KMPP	T. N. Kempahonnaiah	4,972	19.76%	New
ABJS	K. Bheemaiah	3,787	15.05%	New
Socialist Party (India)	K. A. Gubbanna	2,171	8.63%	New
Independent	Kempahanumaiah	801	3.18%	New
Margin of victory		8,462	33.63%	
Turnout		25,165	59.02%	
Total valid votes		25,165		
Registered electors		42,636		
INC win (new seat)				

== See also ==
- List of constituencies of the Karnataka Legislative Assembly
