= G. S. Basavaraj =

Indian politician

Gangasandra Siddappa Basavaraj
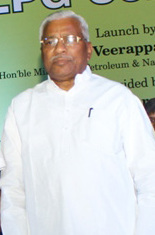
- G S Basavaraju in 2013

Member of the Indian Parliament for Tumkur
- In office 23 May 2019 – 4 June 2024
- Preceded by: S. P. Muddahanumegowda
- Succeeded by: V. Somanna
- In office 2009–2014
- Preceded by: S. Mallikarjunaiah
- Succeeded by: S. P. Muddahanumegowda

Personal details
- Born: 4 May 1941 (age 85) Gangasandra, Tumkur, Tumkur District, Karnataka
- Party: Bharatiya Janata Party (2004–present); Indian National Congress (until 2004)
- Spouse: S. Shakunthala
- Children: 2 sons

Gangasandra Siddappa Basavaraj (born 1941) is an Indian politician from Karnataka. He is a five time MLA from Tumkur Lok Sabha constituency who represents Bharatiya Janata Party.

== Early life and education ==
Basavaraj was born in Tumkur to Siddappa and Nanjamma. He married S Shakunthala and they have two sons. One son, G. B. Jyothi Ganesh, is an MLA from Tumkur City. He completed his graduation in science.

== Career ==
Basavaraj started his political career with Indian National Congress and then became a member of the Bharatiya Janata Party (BJP). He defeated former prime minister H. D. Deve Gowda in the 2019 Indian general elections in Karnataka by a margin of nearly 15,000 votes in Tumkur Lok Sabha constituency.

He has been elected to Lok Sabha from Tumkur five times, in 1984, 1989 and 1999 as member of Indian National Congress, and in 2009 and 2019 as member of BJP.

In the 2004 elections, he finished third as Congress candidate behind BJP and JD (S) candidates in Tumkur. He joined BJP after this defeat. In 2014, he was the losing candidate for BJP. However, he won in 2019.

== Political career ==
- Member of 8th Lok Sabha
- Member of 9th Lok Sabha (1989-1991)
- Member of 13th Lok Sabha (1999-2004)
- Member of 15th Lok Sabha (2009-2014)
- Member of 17th Lok Sabha
