= C. N. Bhaskarappa =

Indian politician

Member of Parliament, Lok Sabha
- In office 1996–1998
- Preceded by: S. Mallikarjunaiah
- Succeeded by: S. Mallikarjunaiah
- Constituency: Tumkur, Karnataka

Personal details
- Born: 13 November 1942 (age 83)
- Party: Janata Dal

C. N. Bhaskarappa is an Indian politician, elected to the Lok Sabha, the lower house of the Parliament of India as a member of the Janata Dal.
