= Bellavi Assembly constituency =

Former Assembly constituency in Karnataka, India

Coordinates: 13.415122°N 77.017489°E

Bellavi
- Former constituency for the Karnataka Legislative Assembly

Constituency details
- Country: India
- Region: South India
- State: Karnataka
- Division: Bangalore
- District: Tumkur
- Lok Sabha constituency: Tumkur
- Established: 1978
- Abolished: 2008
- Reservation: None

Bellavi Assembly constituency was one of the constituencies in Karnataka state assembly in India until 2008 when it was made defunct. It was part of Tumkur Lok Sabha constituency.

== Members of the Legislative Assembly ==
Election	Member	Party
1978	G. S. Shivananjappa	Janata Party
1983	T. H. H. Anumantharayappa	Indian National Congress
1985	C. N. Bhaskarappa	Janata Party
1989	R. Narayana	Indian National Congress
1994	R. Narayana	Indian National Congress
1999	R. Narayana	Indian National Congress
2004	K. N. Rajanna	Janata Dal

== Election results ==
=== Assembly Election 2004 ===
2004 Karnataka Legislative Assembly election : Bellavi
Party	Candidate	Votes	%	±%
JD(S)	K. N. Rajanna	35,099	31.07%	▲23.23
BJP	Mahadevaiah. C. V	33,595	29.74%	▲8.78
INC	R. Narayana	29,481	26.10%	▼20.50
JP	Srinivas. B. P	7,343	6.50%	New
Independent	Shivanna. M. J	3,760	3.33%	New
SP	Kodiyala Krishnamurthy	994	0.88%	New
Kannada Nadu Party	Dr B. Yellappa	730	0.65%	New
Margin of victory		1,504	1.33%	▼24.30
Turnout		112,960	75.11%	▲1.09
Total valid votes		112,960		
Registered electors		150,402		▲11.71
JD(S) gain from INC		Swing	▼15.53	

=== Assembly Election 1999 ===
1999 Karnataka Legislative Assembly election : Bellavi
Party	Candidate	Votes	%	±%
INC	R. Narayana	43,803	46.60%	▲22.06
BJP	V. N. Murthy	19,707	20.96%	▲6.26
JD(U)	Lakshminarasimhaiah	14,353	15.27%	New
JD(S)	T. R. Nagaraja	7,373	7.84%	New
Independent	Sagaranahally Revanna	2,319	2.47%	New
Independent	A. M. Nagaraj	1,747	1.86%	New
Independent	Lakshmi Devi	1,528	1.63%	New
Independent	Shivakumar	1,230	1.31%	New
BSP	Muniraju	1,100	1.17%	New
Margin of victory		24,096	25.63%	▲23.66
Turnout		99,664	74.02%	▲0.28
Total valid votes		94,004		
Rejected ballots		5,660	5.68%	▲3.41
Registered electors		134,641		▲4.51
INC hold		Swing	▲22.06	

=== Assembly Election 1994 ===
1994 Karnataka Legislative Assembly election : Bellavi
Party	Candidate	Votes	%	±%
INC	R. Narayana	22,777	24.54%	▼17.10
JD	C. N. Bhaskarappa	20,946	22.56%	▲4.10
BJP	V. N. Murthy	13,645	14.70%	▲3.93
INC	G. Mudligirigowda	10,792	11.63%	New
Independent	S. Ramalingaiah	8,365	9.01%	New
SJP	H. Ningaiah	6,648	7.16%	New
Independent	J. V. Sadashivaiah	5,871	6.32%	New
JP	Renuka Paramesh	1,150	1.24%	New
Independent	R. Devaraju	1,033	1.11%	New
Margin of victory		1,831	1.97%	▼21.21
Turnout		94,995	73.74%	▲3.40
Total valid votes		92,834		
Rejected ballots		2,161	2.27%	▼5.08
Registered electors		128,826		▲6.44
INC hold		Swing	▼17.10	

=== Assembly Election 1989 ===
1989 Karnataka Legislative Assembly election : Bellavi
Party	Candidate	Votes	%	±%
INC	R. Narayana	32,846	41.64%	▲4.51
JD	C. N. Bhaskarappa	14,560	18.46%	New
BJP	S. Ramalingaiah	8,496	10.77%	▲7.41
Independent	D. B. Jayadevappa	7,169	9.09%	New
JP	A. C. Rangaswamy	4,868	6.17%	New
Independent	A. M. Lingappa	3,116	3.95%	New
Independent	M. Puttathimmaiah	2,486	3.15%	New
Independent	M. P. Puttushamaiah	2,054	2.60%	New
Independent	Sanneerappa	534	0.68%	New
Margin of victory		18,286	23.18%	▲6.75
Turnout		85,133	70.34%	▼2.17
Total valid votes		78,873		
Rejected ballots		6,260	7.35%	▲5.80
Registered electors		121,028		▲25.36
INC gain from JP		Swing	▼11.91	

=== Assembly Election 1985 ===
1985 Karnataka Legislative Assembly election : Bellavi
Party	Candidate	Votes	%	±%
JP	C. N. Bhaskarappa	36,909	53.55%	▲7.26
INC	C. Shivamurthy	25,586	37.13%	▼10.80
LKD	K. S. Siddaraju	2,376	3.45%	New
BJP	G. V. Krishnamurthy	2,314	3.36%	New
Independent	Kempanna	649	0.94%	New
Margin of victory		11,323	16.43%	▲14.79
Turnout		70,003	72.51%	▲0.61
Total valid votes		68,918		
Rejected ballots		1,085	1.55%	▼0.72
Registered electors		96,541		▲10.53
JP gain from INC		Swing	▲5.62	

=== Assembly Election 1983 ===
1983 Karnataka Legislative Assembly election : Bellavi
Party	Candidate	Votes	%	±%
INC	T. H. H. Anumantharayappa	29,418	47.93%	▲45.29
JP	C. N. Bhaskarappa	28,410	46.29%	▼1.16
Independent	B. C. Narayanappa	1,554	2.53%	New
Independent	Krishnamurthy	850	1.38%	New
Independent	G. D. Navarathnakumar	718	1.17%	New
Independent	A. S. Chandraiah	423	0.69%	New
Margin of victory		1,008	1.64%	▲0.61
Turnout		62,797	71.90%	▼2.39
Total valid votes		61,373		
Rejected ballots		1,424	2.27%	▼0.26
Registered electors		87,342		▲8.20
INC gain from JP		Swing	▲0.48	

=== Assembly Election 1978 ===
1978 Karnataka Legislative Assembly election : Bellavi
Party	Candidate	Votes	%	±%
JP	G. S. Shivananjappa	27,736	47.45%	New
INC(I)	R. Narayana	27,134	46.42%	New
INC	T. Govindaraju	1,543	2.64%	New
Independent	T. V. N. Prasad Jain	1,013	1.73%	New
Independent	Chinnakotappa	550	0.94%	New
Margin of victory		602	1.03%	
Turnout		59,972	74.29%	
Total valid votes		58,455		
Rejected ballots		1,517	2.53%	
Registered electors		80,724		
JP win (new seat)				

== See also ==
- List of constituencies of the Karnataka Legislative Assembly
