= Madhugiri Assembly constituency =

Legislative Assembly constituency in Karnataka, India

Coordinates: 13.66°N 77.21°E

Madhugiri
- Constituency No. 138 for the Karnataka Legislative Assembly

Constituency details
- Country: India
- Region: South India
- State: Karnataka
- District: Tumkur
- Lok Sabha constituency: Tumkur
- Established: 1956
- Total electors: 193,581 (2023)
- Reservation: None

Member of Legislative Assembly
- 16th Karnataka Legislative Assembly
- Incumbent K. N. Rajanna
- Party: Indian National Congress
- Elected year: 2023
- Preceded by: M.V. Veerabhadraiah

Madhugiri Assembly constituency is one of the 224 constituencies in the Karnataka Legislative Assembly of Karnataka, a southern state of India. It is also part of Tumkur Lok Sabha constituency.

== Members of the Legislative Assembly ==
Election	Member	Party
1957	Mali Mariyappa	Indian National Congress
1957	R. Channigaramaiah	Indian National Congress
1962	T. S. Shivanna	Praja Socialist Party
1967	G. T. G. Reddy	Indian National Congress
1972	Chikkaiah. R	Indian National Congress
1978	Ganga Hanumaiah	Indian National Congress
1983	Rajavardhan	Janata Party
1985	Rajavardhan	Janata Party
1989	G. Parameshwara	Indian National Congress
1994	Ganga Hanumaiah	Janata Dal
1999	Dr. G. Parameshwara	Indian National Congress
2004	Dr. G. Parameshwara	Indian National Congress
2008	D. C. Gowri Shankar	Janata Dal
2008 By-election (Note: Resigned on 18/08/2008)	Anitha Kumaraswamy	Janata Dal
2013	K. N. Rajanna	Indian National Congress
2018	M. V. Veerabhadraiah	Janata Dal
2023	K. N. Rajanna	Indian National Congress

== Election results ==
=== Assembly Election 2023 ===
2023 Karnataka Legislative Assembly election : Madhugiri
Party	Candidate	Votes	%	±%
INC	K. N. Rajanna	91,166	54.72%	▲12.60
JD(S)	M. V. Veerabhadraiah	55,643	33.40%	▼19.91
BJP	L. C. Nagaraja	15,612	9.37%	▲7.62
NOTA	None of the above	618	0.37%	▲0.11
Margin of victory		35,523	21.32%	▲10.13
Turnout		167,699	86.63%	▲0.70
Total valid votes		166,615		
Registered electors		193,581		▲0.12
INC gain from JD(S)		Swing	▲1.41	

=== Assembly Election 2018 ===
2018 Karnataka Legislative Assembly election : Madhugiri
Party	Candidate	Votes	%	±%
JD(S)	M. V. Veerabhadraiah	88,521	53.31%	▲12.65
INC	K. N. Rajanna	69,947	42.12%	▼8.22
BJP	Ramesh Reddy. S. E	2,911	1.75%	▲0.58
Independent	Veerabhadreshaiah	1,532	0.92%	New
NOTA	None of the above	428	0.26%	New
Margin of victory		18,574	11.19%	▲1.52
Turnout		166,157	85.93%	▲5.21
Total valid votes		166,060		
Registered electors		193,354		▲5.92
JD(S) gain from INC		Swing	▲2.97	

=== Assembly Election 2013 ===
2013 Karnataka Legislative Assembly election : Madhugiri
Party	Candidate	Votes	%	±%
INC	K. N. Rajanna	75,086	50.34%	New
JD(S)	M. V. Veerabhadraiah	60,659	40.66%	New
Independent	Lakshminarayana	2,183	1.46%	New
BSP	Koramangala Muniyappa	1,992	1.34%	New
Independent	Rajanna	1,929	1.29%	New
BJP	B. Sumitradevi	1,741	1.17%	New
Margin of victory		14,427	9.67%	
Turnout		147,353	80.72%	
Total valid votes		149,168		
Registered electors		182,550		
INC gain from JD(S)				

=== Assembly By-election 2008 ===
2008 Karnataka Legislative Assembly by-election : Madhugiri
Party	Candidate	Votes	%	±%
JD(S)	Anitha Kumaraswamy			
JD(S) hold		Swing	▼42.01	

=== Assembly Election 2008 ===
2008 Karnataka Legislative Assembly election : Madhugiri
Party	Candidate	Votes	%	±%
JD(S)	D. C. Gowri Shankar	51,971	42.01%	▲15.19
INC	K. N. Rajanna	51,408	41.55%	▼0.75
BJP	Dr. G. K. Jayaram	7,565	6.11%	▼10.67
Independent	Ashwath Narayana Reddy	4,229	3.42%	New
Independent	M. N. Venugopala Rao	2,441	1.97%	New
Independent	M. Vishwanathareddy	1,363	1.10%	New
Independent	Vijaya Kumar. N	1,171	0.95%	New
BSP	Pandurangaiah	769	0.62%	▼0.96
Margin of victory		563	0.46%	▼15.02
Turnout		123,866	75.18%	▲7.92
Total valid votes		123,713		
Registered electors		164,750		▼0.38
JD(S) gain from INC		Swing	▼0.29	

=== Assembly Election 2004 ===
2004 Karnataka Legislative Assembly election : Madhugiri
Party	Candidate	Votes	%	±%
INC	Dr. G. Parameshwara	47,039	42.30%	▼25.97
JD(S)	Kenchamaraiah. H	29,826	26.82%	▲11.54
BJP	Ashok Rajavardhan	18,658	16.78%	New
Independent	Ganga Hanumaiah	8,726	7.85%	New
JP	Dr. Narasimhappa. K	2,612	2.35%	New
BSP	Bheemappa. T	1,760	1.58%	▲0.92
Independent	Chandra Mohan. H	1,382	1.24%	New
SP	Lakshminarasaiah. N	1,192	1.07%	New
Margin of victory		17,213	15.48%	▼37.51
Turnout		111,243	67.26%	▼4.70
Total valid votes		111,195		
Registered electors		165,385		▲9.21
INC hold		Swing	▼25.97	

=== Assembly Election 1999 ===
1999 Karnataka Legislative Assembly election : Madhugiri
Party	Candidate	Votes	%	±%
INC	Dr. G. Parameshwara	71,895	68.27%	▲27.75
JD(S)	Ganga Hanumaiah	16,093	15.28%	New
JD(U)	Rajavardhan	13,664	12.98%	New
Independent	S. D. Krishnappa	2,611	2.48%	New
BSP	S. H. Anjinappa	695	0.66%	New
Margin of victory		55,802	52.99%	▲49.94
Turnout		108,977	71.96%	▼2.53
Total valid votes		105,305		
Rejected ballots		3,672	3.37%	▲1.50
Registered electors		151,432		▲6.43
INC gain from JD		Swing	▲24.70	

=== Assembly Election 1994 ===
1994 Karnataka Legislative Assembly election : Madhugiri
Party	Candidate	Votes	%	±%
JD	Ganga Hanumaiah	45,303	43.57%	▲10.98
INC	Dr. G. Parameshwara	42,131	40.52%	▼11.64
BJP	D. Gangappa	7,251	6.97%	New
Kranti Sabha	Doddarangaiah	5,968	5.74%	▲5.00
INC	Chandra Mohan. H	968	0.93%	New
Margin of victory		3,172	3.05%	▼16.51
Turnout		105,983	74.49%	▲2.20
Total valid votes		103,975		
Rejected ballots		1,985	1.87%	▼3.54
Registered electors		142,279		▲6.88
JD gain from INC		Swing	▼8.59	

=== Assembly Election 1989 ===
1989 Karnataka Legislative Assembly election : Madhugiri
Party	Candidate	Votes	%	±%
INC	G. Parameswara	47,477	52.16%	▲12.64
JD	Rajavardhan	29,670	32.59%	New
JP	B. M. Thippewamy	9,886	10.86%	New
Bharatiya Rashtriya Party	Hemasudha Reddy	2,149	2.36%	New
Kranti Sabha	T. Narasimhaiah	670	0.74%	New
Margin of victory		17,807	19.56%	▲4.59
Turnout		96,237	72.29%	▲0.25
Total valid votes		91,028		
Rejected ballots		5,209	5.41%	▲3.87
Registered electors		133,125		▲22.52
INC gain from JP		Swing	▼2.33	

=== Assembly Election 1985 ===
1985 Karnataka Legislative Assembly election : Madhugiri
Party	Candidate	Votes	%	±%
JP	Rajavardhan	41,992	54.49%	▲6.62
INC	Ganga Hanumaiah	30,456	39.52%	▼7.24
Independent	Dhena Naik	2,252	2.92%	New
Independent	H. Thimmaiah	1,454	1.89%	New
Margin of victory		11,536	14.97%	▲13.86
Turnout		78,272	72.04%	▲9.01
Total valid votes		77,065		
Rejected ballots		1,207	1.54%	▼1.15
Registered electors		108,655		▲9.41
JP hold		Swing	▲6.62	

=== Assembly Election 1983 ===
1983 Karnataka Legislative Assembly election : Madhugiri
Party	Candidate	Votes	%	±%
JP	Rajavardhan	29,159	47.87%	▲6.84
INC	Ganga Hanumaiah	28,483	46.76%	▲43.36
Independent	Nagaratna	1,072	1.76%	New
Independent	P. Narasimhappa	917	1.51%	New
Independent	S. N. Narasimhalu	667	1.09%	New
Independent	Huliramaiah	620	1.02%	New
Margin of victory		676	1.11%	▼9.80
Turnout		62,599	63.03%	▼7.00
Total valid votes		60,918		
Rejected ballots		1,681	2.69%	▼0.09
Registered electors		99,312		▲7.45
JP gain from INC(I)		Swing	▼4.07	

=== Assembly Election 1978 ===
1978 Karnataka Legislative Assembly election : Madhugiri
Party	Candidate	Votes	%	±%
INC(I)	Ganga Hanumaiah	32,686	51.94%	New
JP	Gangabovi	25,820	41.03%	New
INC	H. Hanumantharayappa	2,141	3.40%	▼51.94
Independent	K. C. Rajavardhana	968	1.54%	New
Independent	S. N. Narasimhalu	684	1.09%	New
Independent	S. Anjaiah	632	1.00%	New
Margin of victory		6,866	10.91%	▲0.23
Turnout		64,730	70.03%	▲3.43
Total valid votes		62,931		
Rejected ballots		1,799	2.78%	▲2.78
Registered electors		92,428		▲37.85
INC(I) gain from INC		Swing	▼3.40	

=== Assembly Election 1972 ===
1972 Mysore State Legislative Assembly election : Madhugiri
Party	Candidate	Votes	%	±%
INC	Chikkaiah. R	24,071	55.34%	▲0.41
INC(O)	M. N. Nagabhushana	19,425	44.66%	New
Margin of victory		4,646	10.68%	▼21.61
Turnout		44,653	66.60%	▲14.79
Total valid votes		43,496		
Registered electors		67,050		▲0.13
INC hold		Swing	▲0.41	

=== Assembly Election 1967 ===
1967 Mysore State Legislative Assembly election : Madhugiri
Party	Candidate	Votes	%	±%
INC	G. T. G. Reddy	17,183	54.93%	▲13.01
Independent	T. H. Hanumantharayappa	7,083	22.64%	New
Independent	B. Rangaiah	5,061	16.18%	New
Margin of victory		10,100	32.29%	▲22.57
Turnout		34,696	51.81%	▼13.26
Total valid votes		31,280		
Registered electors		66,962		▲11.40
INC gain from PSP		Swing	▲3.30	

=== Assembly Election 1962 ===
1962 Mysore State Legislative Assembly election : Madhugiri
Party	Candidate	Votes	%	±%
PSP	T. S. Shivanna	19,083	51.63%	▲6.21
INC	G. T. Govinda Reddy	15,492	41.92%	▼12.66
ABJS	T. S. Gundu Rao	2,385	6.45%	New
Margin of victory		3,591	9.72%	▲5.19
Turnout		39,112	65.07%	▲17.77
Total valid votes		36,960		
Registered electors		60,110		▼40.19
PSP gain from INC		Swing	▲23.44	

=== Assembly Election 1957 ===
1957 Mysore State Legislative Assembly election : Madhugiri
Party	Candidate	Votes	%	±%
INC	Mali Mariyappa	26,807	28.19%	New
INC	R. Channigaramaiah	25,095	26.39%	New
PSP	T. S. Shivanna	22,501	23.66%	New
PSP	S. Anjaiah	20,682	21.75%	New
Margin of victory		4,306	4.53%	
Turnout		95,085	47.30%	
Total valid votes		95,085		
Registered electors		100,506		
INC win (new seat)				

== See also ==
- List of constituencies of Karnataka Legislative Assembly
- Tumkur district
