= Hebbur Assembly constituency =

Former Assembly constituency in Karnataka, India

Coordinates: 17.354827°N 77.154110°E

Hebbur
- Former constituency for the State Legislative Assembly

Constituency details
- Country: India
- State: Mysore State
- Division: Bangalore
- District: Tumkur
- Lok Sabha constituency: Tumkur
- Established: 1957
- Abolished: 1967

Hebbur Assembly constituency was one of the constituencies in Mysore state assembly in India until 1967 when it was made defunct. It was part of Tumkur Lok Sabha constituency.

== Members of the Legislative Assembly ==
Election	Member	Party
1957	K. L. Narasimhaiah	Indian National Congress
1962	K. Lakkappa	Praja Socialist Party

== Election results ==
=== Assembly Election 1962 ===
1962 Mysore State Legislative Assembly election : Hebbur
Party	Candidate	Votes	%	±%
PSP	K. Lakkappa	21,822	54.61%	▲17.82
INC	K. L. Narasimhaiah	18,140	45.39%	▼17.82
Margin of victory		3,682	9.21%	▼17.20
Turnout		41,742	72.15%	▲17.20
Total valid votes		39,962		
Registered electors		57,851		▲12.37
PSP gain from INC		Swing	▼8.60	

=== Assembly Election 1957 ===
1957 Mysore State Legislative Assembly election : Hebbur
Party	Candidate	Votes	%	±%
INC	K. L. Narasimhaiah	17,882	63.21%	New
PSP	K. Lakkappa	10,409	36.79%	New
Margin of victory		7,473	26.41%	
Turnout		28,291	54.95%	
Total valid votes		28,291		
Registered electors		51,484		
INC win (new seat)				

== See also ==
- List of constituencies of the Mysore Legislative Assembly
