= Gubbi Assembly constituency =

Legislative Assembly constituency in Karnataka, India

Coordinates: 13.31°N 76.94°E

Gubbi
- Constituency No. 135 for the Karnataka Legislative Assembly

Constituency details
- Country: India
- Region: South India
- State: Karnataka
- District: Tumkur
- Lok Sabha constituency: Tumkur
- Established: 1951
- Total electors: 181,139 (2023)
- Reservation: None

Member of Legislative Assembly
- 16th Karnataka Legislative Assembly
- Incumbent S. R. Srinivas
- Party: Indian National Congress
- Elected year: 2023
- Preceded by: N. Veeranna Gowda

Gubbi Assembly constituency is one of the 224 constituencies in the Karnataka Legislative Assembly of Karnataka, a southern state of India. It is also part of Tumkur Lok Sabha constituency.

== Members of the Legislative Assembly ==
Election	Member	Party
1952	C. M. Annayyappa	Indian National Congress
1957	C. J. Mukkannappa	Independent politician
1962	V. M. Deo	Independent politician
1967	Chikkegowda	Indian National Congress
1972	Gatti Chandrasekhar	Indian National Congress
1978	Gatti Chandrasekhar	Indian National Congress
1983	S. Revanna	Janata Party
1985	G. S. Shivananiaha	Indian National Congress
1989	G. S. Shivananiaha	Indian National Congress
1994	G. S. Shivananiaha	Independent politician
1999	N. Veeranna Gowda	Janata Dal
2004	S. R. Srinivas	Independent politician
2008	S. R. Srinivas	Janata Dal
2013	S. R. Srinivas	Janata Dal
2018	S. R. Srinivas	Janata Dal
2023	S. R. Srinivas	Indian National Congress

== Election results ==
=== Assembly Election 2023 ===
2023 Karnataka Legislative Assembly election : Gubbi
Party	Candidate	Votes	%	±%
INC	S. R. Srinivas	60,520	37.79%	▲28.82
BJP	S. D. Dilipkumar	51,979	32.46%	▲2.55
JD(S)	Nagaraju. B. S	43,046	26.88%	▼8.88
AAP	Prabhuswamy. B. S	1,834	1.15%	▲0.42
NOTA	None of the above	726	0.45%	▲0.16
Margin of victory		8,541	5.33%	▼0.51
Turnout		160,166	88.42%	▲3.43
Total valid votes		160,136		
Registered electors		181,139		▼0.96
INC gain from JD(S)		Swing	▲2.03	

=== Assembly Election 2018 ===
2018 Karnataka Legislative Assembly election : Gubbi
Party	Candidate	Votes	%	±%
JD(S)	S. R. Srinivas	55,572	35.76%	▼1.11
BJP	G. N. Bettaswamy	46,491	29.91%	▲28.41
Independent	S. D. Dilipkumar	30,528	19.64%	New
INC	K. Kumar (Balaji Kumar)	13,938	8.97%	▼2.66
Independent	H. T. Krishnappa	3,296	2.12%	New
AAP	Prabhuswamy. B. S	1,129	0.73%	New
Independent	Bettaswamy	983	0.63%	New
NOTA	None of the above	457	0.29%	New
Margin of victory		9,081	5.84%	▲1.30
Turnout		155,440	84.99%	▲1.77
Total valid votes		155,420		
Registered electors		182,902		▲8.94
JD(S) hold		Swing	▼1.11	

=== Assembly Election 2013 ===
2013 Karnataka Legislative Assembly election : Gubbi
Party	Candidate	Votes	%	±%
JD(S)	S. R. Srinivas	58,783	36.87%	▼5.24
KJP	G. N. Bettaswamy	51,539	32.32%	New
INC	Honnagirigowda	18,548	11.63%	▼10.33
BJP	Nataraja Sagaranahally	2,396	1.50%	▼28.80
BSRCP	G. K. Hucchegowda	2,233	1.40%	New
Independent	Bettaswamy	1,798	1.13%	New
Margin of victory		7,244	4.54%	▼7.27
Turnout		139,733	83.22%	▲2.76
Total valid votes		159,445		
Registered electors		167,900		▲8.76
JD(S) hold		Swing	▼5.24	

=== Assembly Election 2008 ===
2008 Karnataka Legislative Assembly election : Gubbi
Party	Candidate	Votes	%	±%
JD(S)	S. R. Srinivas	52,302	42.11%	▲14.58
BJP	C. V. Mahadevaiah	37,630	30.30%	▲14.55
INC	Shivakumara	27,280	21.96%	▲10.64
Independent	Srinivasa. M. N	3,335	2.69%	New
BSP	Shivanna	2,143	1.73%	New
Independent	Udayakumar	1,512	1.22%	New
Margin of victory		14,672	11.81%	▲0.77
Turnout		124,205	80.46%	▲5.31
Total valid votes		124,202		
Registered electors		154,375		▲10.62
JD(S) gain from Independent		Swing	▲3.54	

=== Assembly Election 2004 ===
2004 Karnataka Legislative Assembly election : Gubbi
Party	Candidate	Votes	%	±%
Independent	S. R. Srinivas	40,431	38.57%	New
JD(S)	Shivananjappa. G. S	28,854	27.53%	▼14.39
BJP	Nanje Gowda	16,509	15.75%	New
INC	Paramashivaiah	11,865	11.32%	▼26.27
Kannada Nadu Party	Mallikarjunaiah. B. T	3,820	3.64%	New
JP	Chandrashekaraiah. B. S	2,319	2.21%	New
Independent	Chikkananjaiah	1,023	0.98%	New
Margin of victory		11,577	11.04%	▲6.71
Turnout		104,877	75.15%	▼2.32
Total valid votes		104,821		
Registered electors		139,558		▲10.70
Independent gain from JD(S)		Swing	▼3.35	

=== Assembly Election 1999 ===
1999 Karnataka Legislative Assembly election : Gubbi
Party	Candidate	Votes	%	±%
JD(S)	N. Veeranna Gowda	39,272	41.92%	New
INC	G. S. Shivananjappa	35,217	37.59%	▲6.46
JD(U)	K. R. Tataiah	13,648	14.57%	New
Independent	B. Shivananjappa	2,520	2.69%	New
Independent	N. S. Jothi Prakash	1,617	1.73%	New
BSP	Shivanna	1,417	1.51%	New
Margin of victory		4,055	4.33%	▼5.10
Turnout		97,669	77.47%	▼0.72
Total valid votes		93,691		
Rejected ballots		3,978	4.07%	▲2.64
Registered electors		126,072		▲5.44
JD(S) gain from Independent		Swing	▲1.36	

=== Assembly Election 1994 ===
1994 Karnataka Legislative Assembly election : Gubbi
Party	Candidate	Votes	%	±%
Independent	G. S. Shivananjappa	37,374	40.56%	New
INC	G. S. Basavaraj	28,684	31.13%	▼11.72
JD	S. M. Shivakumaraswamy	15,516	16.84%	▼5.32
BJP	Dr. Chandrashekharachar	5,527	6.00%	▲3.79
KRRS	A. Govindaraju	3,297	3.58%	New
INC	G. V. Guruswamy	884	0.96%	New
Margin of victory		8,690	9.43%	▼11.26
Turnout		93,487	78.19%	▲4.14
Total valid votes		92,148		
Rejected ballots		1,339	1.43%	▼4.16
Registered electors		119,567		▲6.84
Independent gain from INC		Swing	▼2.29	

=== Assembly Election 1989 ===
1989 Karnataka Legislative Assembly election : Gubbi
Party	Candidate	Votes	%	±%
INC	G. S. Shivananjappa	33,524	42.85%	▼1.52
JD	K. R. Thathaiah	17,339	22.16%	New
JP	B. S. Siddalingegowda	16,650	21.28%	New
Independent	G. H. Bhashasab	3,433	4.39%	New
Independent	Nijananda Murthy	2,737	3.50%	New
Independent	N. Chikkarangaiah	1,788	2.29%	New
BJP	B. M. Gangadharaiah	1,728	2.21%	▼1.41
Margin of victory		16,185	20.69%	▲11.48
Turnout		82,867	74.05%	▲4.66
Total valid votes		78,237		
Rejected ballots		4,630	5.59%	▲4.11
Registered electors		111,912		▲26.45
INC hold		Swing	▼1.52	

=== Assembly Election 1985 ===
1985 Karnataka Legislative Assembly election : Gubbi
Party	Candidate	Votes	%	±%
INC	G. S. Shivananiaha	26,847	44.37%	▲10.18
Independent	S. M. Shivakumaraswamy	21,277	35.16%	New
JP	K. R. Tataiah	8,484	14.02%	▼35.60
BJP	S. Nanjundaiah	2,191	3.62%	▼5.44
Independent	G. S. Girish	1,031	1.70%	New
Margin of victory		5,570	9.21%	▼6.22
Turnout		61,416	69.39%	▼4.43
Total valid votes		60,509		
Rejected ballots		907	1.48%	▼0.38
Registered electors		88,506		▲8.18
INC gain from JP		Swing	▼5.25	

=== Assembly Election 1983 ===
1983 Karnataka Legislative Assembly election : Gubbi
Party	Candidate	Votes	%	±%
JP	S. Revanna	29,409	49.62%	▲7.78
INC	Gatti Chandrasekhar	20,264	34.19%	▲28.85
BJP	Nanje Gowda	5,367	9.06%	New
LKD	Krishnamurthy	2,880	4.86%	New
Margin of victory		9,145	15.43%	▲8.37
Turnout		60,392	73.82%	▼5.23
Total valid votes		59,268		
Rejected ballots		1,124	1.86%	▼0.06
Registered electors		81,815		▲10.05
JP gain from INC(I)		Swing	▲0.72	

=== Assembly Election 1978 ===
1978 Karnataka Legislative Assembly election : Gubbi
Party	Candidate	Votes	%	±%
INC(I)	Gatti Chandrasekhar	28,186	48.90%	New
JP	S. Revanna	24,117	41.84%	New
INC	G. S. Basavaraj	3,076	5.34%	▼53.15
Independent	Javare Gowda	1,331	2.31%	New
Independent	Maniyappa	927	1.61%	New
Margin of victory		4,069	7.06%	▼9.91
Turnout		58,766	79.05%	▲18.43
Total valid votes		57,637		
Rejected ballots		1,129	1.92%	▲1.92
Registered electors		74,343		▲5.98
INC(I) gain from INC		Swing	▼9.59	

=== Assembly Election 1972 ===
1972 Mysore State Legislative Assembly election : Gubbi
Party	Candidate	Votes	%	±%
INC	Gatti Chandrasekhar	24,214	58.49%	▲23.19
INC(O)	S. Revanna	17,187	41.51%	New
Margin of victory		7,027	16.97%	▲15.05
Turnout		42,521	60.62%	▼1.72
Total valid votes		41,401		
Registered electors		70,145		▲19.29
INC hold		Swing	▲23.19	

=== Assembly Election 1967 ===
1967 Mysore State Legislative Assembly election : Gubbi
Party	Candidate	Votes	%	±%
INC	Chikkegowda	11,962	35.30%	▲1.85
PSP	B. G. Bhagavan	11,311	33.37%	New
SWA	R. Narasimhiah	5,778	17.05%	New
Independent	H. V. Nanjamma	4,840	14.28%	New
Margin of victory		651	1.92%	▲0.15
Turnout		36,656	62.34%	▲4.61
Total valid votes		33,891		
Registered electors		58,803		▲5.46
INC gain from Independent		Swing	▲0.08	

=== Assembly Election 1962 ===
1962 Mysore State Legislative Assembly election : Gubbi
Party	Candidate	Votes	%	±%
Independent	V. M. Deo	10,420	35.22%	New
INC	R. S. Aradhya	9,896	33.45%	▲7.14
Independent	Doddahalappa	6,046	20.43%	New
CPI	K. Mallana	3,225	10.90%	▲7.26
Margin of victory		524	1.77%	▼4.08
Turnout		32,188	57.73%	▲5.40
Total valid votes		29,587		
Registered electors		55,760		▲10.11
Independent hold		Swing	▲3.06	

=== Assembly Election 1957 ===
1957 Mysore State Legislative Assembly election : Gubbi
Party	Candidate	Votes	%	±%
Independent	C. J. Mukkannappa	8,521	32.16%	New
INC	Gatti Revanna	6,972	26.31%	▼7.29
Independent	N. Channappa	6,373	24.05%	New
Independent	S. Revanna	2,801	10.57%	New
CPI	H. C. Channappa	964	3.64%	New
Independent	S. N. Srirangappa	868	3.28%	New
Margin of victory		1,549	5.85%	▼0.70
Turnout		26,499	52.33%	▼6.04
Total valid votes		26,499		
Registered electors		50,639		▲21.56
Independent gain from INC		Swing	▼1.44	

=== Assembly Election 1952 ===
1952 Mysore State Legislative Assembly election : Gubbi
Party	Candidate	Votes	%	±%
INC	C. M. Annayyappa	8,171	33.60%	New
Socialist Party (India)	N. Channappa	6,578	27.05%	New
Independent	G. S. Mahadevappa	3,325	13.67%	New
KMPP	B. G. Bhagavan	2,241	9.22%	New
Independent	A. Siddaramaiah	1,956	8.04%	New
Independent	R. Narasimhiah	1,329	5.47%	New
ABJS	G. S. Thammaiah	717	2.95%	New
Margin of victory		1,593	6.55%	
Turnout		24,317	58.37%	
Total valid votes		24,317		
Registered electors		41,657		
INC win (new seat)				

== See also ==
- List of constituencies of Karnataka Legislative Assembly
- Tumkur district
