= K. Shadakshari =

Indian politician (born 1949)

K. Shadakshari (born 1949) is an Indian politician from Karnataka who is an MLA from Tumkur district representing Indian National Congress. He won the Tiptur Assembly constituency in the 2023 Karnataka Legislative Assembly election.

== Early life and education ==
Shadakshari is from Tiptur, Tumkur district. His father Kallappa was a farmer. He completed his Bachelor of Commerce degree at R.V. College, which is affiliated with Bangalore University.

== Career ==
Shadakshari won the Tiptur Assembly constituency representing Indian National Congress in the 2023 Karnataka Legislative Assembly election. He polled 71,999 votes and defeated his nearest rival, B. C. Nagesh of Bharatiya Janata Party, by a margin of 17,652 votes. Earlier in 2018 he lost to the same candidate, Nagesh, in the 2018 Karnataka Legislative Assembly election. He won as an MLA for the first time winning the 1999 Karnataka Legislative Assembly election representing Indian National Congress from Tiptur. He was elected for the second time winning the 2013 Karnataka Legislative Assembly election.
