= Mali Mariyappa =

Indian politician

Member of Parliament, Lok Sabha
- In office 1965–1967
- Preceded by: Ajit Prasad Jain
- Succeeded by: K. Lakkappa
- Constituency: Tumkur, Karnataka

Personal details
- Born: 18 February 1912
- Died: 1968 (aged 55–56)
- Party: Indian National Congress
- Profession: Advocate and Agriculturist

Mali Mariyappa (18 February 1912 – 1968) was an Indian politician, elected to the Lok Sabha, the lower house of the Parliament of India as a member of the Indian National Congress.

== Early life and background ==
Mali Mariyappa was born on 18 February 1912 in Sira town. Mali Dodda Madappa was his father. He completed his B.A. and LLB education from Maharaja's College, Mysore and Ferguson College, Poona.

== Personal life ==
Mariyappa married Laxmamma on 2 June 1932 and the couple had two sons and three daughters.

== Political career ==
Mali Mariyappa was active Member of the Congress since 1936 and served as a President and Secretary of District Congress Committee of Tumkur. He was Chairman of Reception Committee of Mysore Congress Annual Session held at Tumkur. In 1962, He became the member of Pradesh Election Committee.

== Position held ==
- Member of State Congress Executive Committee.
- Member of M.P.C.C. (Since 1936)
- Chairman of Reception Committee of Mysore Congress Annual Session held at Tumkur.
- Member of Pradesh Election Committee (1962)
- President of Vallabhbhai Patel Memorial National Society Ltd.
- President of Mahatma Gandhi National Education Society Ltd. Madhugiri.
- Member of Executive Committee in District Central Co-operative Bank Ltd., Tumkur.
- Member of Managing Committee in Seva Mandir, Hindupur.
- Member of All India Khadi and Village Industries Board.
- Director of Bellary Spinning and Weaving Co. Ltd. Bellary.
- Member of Tata Institute of Science, Bangalore.

#	From	To	Position
1.	1947	1951	Member of Mysore state Constituent Assembly
2.	1951	1952	MLA (1st term) from Pavagada (Mysore State)
3.	1952	1957	MLA (2st term) from Koratagere (Mysore State)
4.	1957	1962	MLA (3st term) from Koratagere (Mysore State): Chairman of Public Accounts Committee, State Government of Mysore (1958–1962)
5.	1962	1967	MP (1st term) in 3rd Lok Sabha from Madhugiri (Mysore State)
6.	1967	1970	MP (2nd term) in 4th Lok Sabha from Madhugiri (Mysore State)
