= Tiptur Lok Sabha constituency =

Former constituency of the Indian parliament in Karnataka

Coordinates: 13.3°N 76.5°E

Tiptur
- Former Lok Sabha constituency

Constituency details
- Country: India
- Region: South India
- State: Karnataka
- Established: 1957
- Abolished: 1966
- Reservation: None

Tiptur Lok Sabha constituency was a former Lok Sabha constituency in Mysore State (Karnataka from 1957 to 1967). This seat came into existence in 1957 and ceased to exist in 1966, before 1967 Lok Sabha Elections. This constituency was later merged with Tumkur Lok Sabha constituency.

== Members of Parliament ==
- 1952:Constituency does not exist
- 1957: C. R. Basappa, Indian National Congress
- 1962: C. R. Basappa, Indian National Congress
- 1966 onwards:Constituency does not exist.See Tumkur Lok Sabha constituency

== Election results ==
=== 1957 ===
1957 Indian general election: Tiptur
Party	Candidate	Votes	%	±%
INC	C. R. Basappa	117,681	54.76	
PSP	B. Hutchegowda	75,855	35.30	
Independent (politician)	C. P. Gopalakrishna Setty	21,376	9.95	
Majority				
Turnout		214,912	53.54	
INC win (new seat)				

== See also ==
- Madhugiri Lok Sabha constituency
- Tumkur Lok Sabha constituency
- Tumkur district
- List of former constituencies of the Lok Sabha
