= Turuvekere Assembly constituency =

Legislative Assembly constituency in Karnataka, India

Coordinates: 13.16°N 76.67°E

Turuvekere
- Constituency No. 130 for the Karnataka Legislative Assembly

Constituency details
- Country: India
- Region: South India
- State: Karnataka
- District: Tumkur
- Lok Sabha constituency: Tumkur
- Established: 1956
- Total electors: 199,012
- Reservation: None

Member of Legislative Assembly
- 16th Karnataka Legislative Assembly
- Incumbent M. T. Krishnappa
- Party: JD(S)
- Alliance: NDA
- Elected year: 2023
- Preceded by: A. S. Jayaram

Turuvekere Assembly constituency is one of the 224 constituencies in the Karnataka Legislative Assembly of Karnataka, a southern state of India. It is also part of Tumkur Lok Sabha constituency.

M. T. Krishnappa is the current MLA from Turuvekere.

== Members of the Legislative Assembly ==
Election	Member	Party
1952	B. Hutche Gowda	Kisan Mazdoor Praja Party
1957	T. Subramanya	Indian National Congress
1962	B. Hutche Gowda	Praja Socialist Party
1963 By-election (Note: Died on 05/06/1963)	B. Byrappaji	Praja Socialist Party
1967	M. N. Ramanna	Indian National Congress
1972	B. Byrappaji	Indian National Congress
1978	K. H. Ramakrishnaiah	Indian National Congress
1983	B. Byrappaji	Indian National Congress
1985	K. H. Ramakrishnaiah	Janata Party
1989	S. Rudrappa	Indian National Congress
1994	H. B. Nanjegowda (Murthy)	Janata Dal
1999	M. D. Lakshminarayana	Bharatiya Janata Party
2004	M. T. Krishnappa	Janata Dal
2008	Jaggesh	Indian National Congress
2008 By-election (Note: Resigned on 10/07/2008)	M. T. Krishnappa	Janata Dal
2013	M. T. Krishnappa	Janata Dal
2018	Jayaram. A. S	Bharatiya Janata Party
2023	M. T. Krishnappa	Janata Dal

== Election results ==
=== Assembly Election 2023 ===
2023 Karnataka Legislative Assembly election : Turuvekere
Party	Candidate	Votes	%	±%
JD(S)	M. T. Krishnappa	68,163	42.51%	▲4.30
BJP	Masala Jayaram	58,240	36.32%	▼3.22
INC	Bml. Kanthraj	30,536	19.04%	▲3.03
AAP	Jayaram. G. C	1,018	0.63%	New
NOTA	None of the above	588	0.37%	▼0.25
Margin of victory		9,923	6.19%	▲4.86
Turnout		160,443	87.81%	▲3.05
Total valid votes		160,338		
Registered electors		182,717		▲0.84
JD(S) gain from BJP		Swing	▲2.97	

=== Assembly Election 2018 ===
2018 Karnataka Legislative Assembly election : Turuvekere
Party	Candidate	Votes	%	±%
BJP	Jayaram. A. S	60,710	39.54%	▲37.06
JD(S)	M. T. Krishnappa	58,661	38.21%	▼8.15
INC	Rangappa T. Chowdri	24,584	16.01%	▲10.74
Independent	M. Narayan Gowda	4,566	2.97%	New
Independent	M. D. Ramesh	2,148	1.40%	New
NOTA	None of the above	954	0.62%	New
Margin of victory		2,049	1.33%	▼4.93
Turnout		153,591	84.76%	▲5.16
Total valid votes		153,539		
Registered electors		181,202		▲2.94
BJP gain from JD(S)		Swing	▼6.82	

=== Assembly Election 2013 ===
2013 Karnataka Legislative Assembly election : Turuvekere
Party	Candidate	Votes	%	±%
JD(S)	M. T. Krishnappa	66,089	46.36%	New
KJP	Masala Jayaram	57,164	40.10%	New
INC	Geetha Rajanna	7,513	5.27%	New
BJP	B. K. Somashekara	3,542	2.48%	New
Independent	Shivakumar	1,121	0.79%	New
BSRCP	Rajashekara	1,068	0.75%	New
Margin of victory		8,925	6.26%	
Turnout		140,120	79.60%	
Total valid votes		142,545		
Registered electors		176,022		
JD(S) hold		Swing		

=== Assembly By-election 2008 ===
2008 Karnataka Legislative Assembly by-election : Turuvekere
Party	Candidate	Votes	%	±%
JD(S)	M. T. Krishnappa			
JD(S) gain from INC		Swing	▼37.49	

=== Assembly Election 2008 ===
2008 Karnataka Legislative Assembly election : Turuvekere
Party	Candidate	Votes	%	±%
INC	Jaggesh	47,849	37.49%	▲10.17
BJP	M. D. Lakshminarayana Annaiah	38,323	30.02%	▲0.01
JD(S)	M. T. Krishnappa	35,459	27.78%	▼11.17
Independent	M. R. Rajashekar Shekar	2,798	2.19%	New
BSP	D. S. Umesh	1,624	1.27%	New
Swarna Yuga Party	G. S. Basavalingaiah	1,586	1.24%	New
Margin of victory		9,526	7.46%	▼1.47
Turnout		127,717	78.05%	▲4.19
Total valid votes		127,639		
Registered electors		163,631		▲17.68
INC gain from JD(S)		Swing	▼1.46	

=== Assembly Election 2004 ===
2004 Karnataka Legislative Assembly election : Turuvekere
Party	Candidate	Votes	%	±%
JD(S)	M. T. Krishnappa	39,934	38.95%	▲31.20
BJP	Lakshmi Narayana M. D(annaiah)	30,776	30.01%	▼10.45
INC	Jaggesh	28,009	27.32%	▲13.89
JP	Visheshwaraiah. M	2,095	2.04%	New
Kannada Nadu Party	Siddabasappa. M. B	904	0.88%	New
Independent	Krishnappa	819	0.80%	New
Margin of victory		9,158	8.93%	▼7.34
Turnout		102,699	73.86%	▼3.84
Total valid votes		102,537		
Registered electors		139,046		▲10.21
JD(S) gain from BJP		Swing	▼1.51	

=== Assembly Election 1999 ===
1999 Karnataka Legislative Assembly election : Turuvekere
Party	Candidate	Votes	%	±%
BJP	M. D. Lakshminarayana	38,122	40.46%	▲8.91
Independent	M. T. Krishnappa	22,790	24.19%	New
INC	S. Rudrappa	12,650	13.43%	▼5.70
JD(S)	H. B. Nanjegowda (Murthy)	7,304	7.75%	New
Independent	K. H. Hanumanthe Gowda	7,274	7.72%	New
Independent	H. M. Siddananjappa	5,849	6.21%	New
Margin of victory		15,332	16.27%	▲0.80
Turnout		98,029	77.70%	▼0.66
Total valid votes		94,219		
Rejected ballots		3,807	3.88%	▲2.87
Registered electors		126,162		▲3.07
BJP gain from JD		Swing	▼6.55	

=== Assembly Election 1994 ===
1994 Karnataka Legislative Assembly election : Turuvekere
Party	Candidate	Votes	%	±%
JD	H. B. Nanjegowda (Murthy)	44,384	47.01%	▲34.26
BJP	M. D. Lakshminarayana	29,780	31.55%	▲19.56
INC	M. T. Krishnappa	18,062	19.13%	▼35.05
INC	T. Sivanna	1,219	1.29%	New
Margin of victory		14,604	15.47%	▼19.43
Turnout		95,911	78.36%	▲2.40
Total valid votes		94,404		
Rejected ballots		967	1.01%	▼3.99
Registered electors		122,403		▲9.26
JD gain from INC		Swing	▼7.17	

=== Assembly Election 1989 ===
1989 Karnataka Legislative Assembly election : Turuvekere
Party	Candidate	Votes	%	±%
INC	S. Rudrappa	43,803	54.18%	▲9.39
JP	H. B. Nanjegowda	15,586	19.28%	New
JD	K. H. Ramakrishnaiah	10,308	12.75%	New
BJP	G. B. Kumaraswamy	9,696	11.99%	▲9.96
Independent	Chandraiah	582	0.72%	New
Margin of victory		28,217	34.90%	▲28.38
Turnout		85,101	75.96%	▼0.52
Total valid votes		80,848		
Rejected ballots		4,253	5.00%	▲3.77
Registered electors		112,030		▲23.11
INC gain from JP		Swing	▲2.87	

=== Assembly Election 1985 ===
1985 Karnataka Legislative Assembly election : Turuvekere
Party	Candidate	Votes	%	±%
JP	K. H. Ramakrishnaiah	35,272	51.31%	▲44.98
INC	B. Byrappaji	30,788	44.79%	▼9.28
BJP	M. S. Shanthakumar	1,392	2.03%	▼10.39
Independent	Bommegowda	781	1.14%	New
Margin of victory		4,484	6.52%	▼20.73
Turnout		69,593	76.48%	▼0.42
Total valid votes		68,737		
Rejected ballots		856	1.23%	▼0.18
Registered electors		90,998		▲12.66
JP gain from INC		Swing	▼2.76	

=== Assembly Election 1983 ===
1983 Karnataka Legislative Assembly election : Turuvekere
Party	Candidate	Votes	%	±%
INC	B. Byrappaji	33,110	54.07%	▲29.52
Independent	K. H. Ramakrishnaiah	16,423	26.82%	New
BJP	M. S. Shanthakumar	7,603	12.42%	New
JP	H. A. Ramaiah	3,878	6.33%	▼28.68
Margin of victory		16,687	27.25%	▲22.99
Turnout		62,113	76.90%	▼4.36
Total valid votes		61,238		
Rejected ballots		875	1.41%	▼0.30
Registered electors		80,774		▲8.85
INC gain from INC(I)		Swing	▲14.81	

=== Assembly Election 1978 ===
1978 Karnataka Legislative Assembly election : Turuvekere
Party	Candidate	Votes	%	±%
INC(I)	K. H. Ramakrishnaiah	23,270	39.26%	New
JP	D. M. Nanjappa	20,747	35.01%	New
INC	B. Byrappaji	14,550	24.55%	▼39.63
Independent	K. N. N. Murthy	698	1.18%	New
Margin of victory		2,523	4.26%	▼26.46
Turnout		60,299	81.26%	▲8.15
Total valid votes		59,265		
Rejected ballots		1,034	1.71%	▲1.71
Registered electors		74,209		▲9.80
INC(I) gain from INC		Swing	▼24.92	

=== Assembly Election 1972 ===
1972 Mysore State Legislative Assembly election : Turuvekere
Party	Candidate	Votes	%	±%
INC	B. Byrappaji	30,990	64.18%	▲17.87
INC(O)	T. Sivanna	16,157	33.46%	New
SWA	B. Seetharamaiah	1,141	2.36%	New
Margin of victory		14,833	30.72%	▲28.26
Turnout		49,411	73.11%	▲1.12
Total valid votes		48,288		
Registered electors		67,584		▲18.80
INC hold		Swing	▲17.87	

=== Assembly Election 1967 ===
1967 Mysore State Legislative Assembly election : Turuvekere
Party	Candidate	Votes	%	±%
INC	M. N. Ramanna	18,022	46.31%	▲6.83
PSP	B. Byrappaji	17,065	43.85%	▼16.67
Independent	D. Shivana Gowda	3,830	9.84%	New
Margin of victory		957	2.46%	▼18.57
Turnout		40,955	71.99%	
Total valid votes		38,917		
Registered electors		56,889		
INC gain from PSP		Swing	▼14.21	

=== Assembly By-election 1963 ===
1963 Mysore State Legislative Assembly by-election : Turuvekere
Party	Candidate	Votes	%	±%
PSP	B. Byrappaji	20,289	60.52%	▲6.03
INC	B. H. Padmavathi	13,238	39.48%	▼6.03
Margin of victory		7,051	21.03%	▲12.05
Total valid votes		33,527		
PSP hold		Swing	▲6.03	

=== Assembly Election 1962 ===
1962 Mysore State Legislative Assembly election : Turuvekere
Party	Candidate	Votes	%	±%
PSP	B. Hutche Gowda	18,695	54.49%	▲16.15
INC	T. Subramanya	15,615	45.51%	▼16.15
Margin of victory		3,080	8.98%	▼14.34
Turnout		36,110	72.78%	▲2.54
Total valid votes		34,310		
Registered electors		49,618		▲11.27
PSP gain from INC		Swing	▼7.17	

=== Assembly Election 1957 ===
1957 Mysore State Legislative Assembly election : Turuvekere
Party	Candidate	Votes	%	±%
INC	T. Subramanya	19,313	61.66%	▲26.29
PSP	D. Shivana Gowda	12,010	38.34%	New
Margin of victory		7,303	23.32%	▲20.51
Turnout		31,323	70.24%	▲0.41
Total valid votes		31,323		
Registered electors		44,593		▲12.14
INC gain from KMPP		Swing	▲23.48	

=== Assembly Election 1952 ===
1952 Mysore State Legislative Assembly election : Turuvekere
Party	Candidate	Votes	%	±%
KMPP	B. Hutche Gowda	10,603	38.18%	New
INC	T. Subramanya	9,823	35.37%	New
Socialist Party (India)	T. Sivanna	7,345	26.45%	New
Margin of victory		780	2.81%	
Turnout		27,771	69.83%	
Total valid votes		27,771		
Registered electors		39,767		
KMPP win (new seat)				

== See also ==
- List of constituencies of Karnataka Legislative Assembly
- Tumkur district
