= M. V. Rama Rao =

Indian freedom fighter, lawyer and politician (born 1907)

MV Rama Rao

Member of the Karnataka Legislative Council
- In office 1972–1978
- Constituency: Mysore South East - Graduates Constituency

Minister of State for Home
- Incumbent
- Assumed office 7 June 1965

Minister of State for Law
- Incumbent
- Assumed office 14 March 1962

Member of the Karnataka Legislative Council
- In office 1960–1972
- Constituency: Mysore South - Graduates Constituency

Minister of State for Home
- In office 1 November 1956 – 19 April 1957

Member of the Karnataka Legislative Assembly
- In office 1952–1957
- Constituency: Tumkur

Personal details
- Born: 24 August 1907
- Citizenship: India
- Party: Indian National Congress
- Profession: Advocate

MV Rama Rao (24 August 1907) was an Indian freedom fighter, lawyer and politician. He practiced at the Mysore High Court. He served in the Constituent Assembly of India, Karnataka Legislative Assembly, and later the Karnataka Legislative Council. He was a member of the Indian National Congress.

== Early life ==
MV Rama Rao was born to C Vasudeva Rao, on 24 August 1907, at Tumkur, Mysore State. He went to college at Central College, Bangalore obtaining a BA, and later obtained a degree in law (LLB) from Government Law College, Mumbai. After college, he enrolled as a lawyer at the Mysore High Court in 1934.

In 1942, he became President of the Tumkur Bar Association, from 1942 to 1944 was President of the Tumkur Municipal Council, and in 1941 and 1945 was President of the Tumkur Town Congress Committee. During the Quit India Movement and larger Indian independence movement, he was imprisoned three times for participating in Congress activities, in 1942, 1943 and 1947. When imprisoned in 1942, he was at Bangalore Central Jail.

He was elected to the Mysore Representative Assembly in 1945, the Senate of the University of Mysore in 1948, and the Constituent Assembly from Mysore in 1948. During the Provisional Parliament of India, he represented Mysore from 1950 to 1952.

== Political career ==
In 1952, he won the first legislative assembly election from Tumkur and served as an MLA in the Mysore State Assembly until 1957. From 1955 to 1956, he was the General Secretary of the Mysore Congress. He served as the Home Minister for Mysore from 1 November 1956 to 19 April 1957, in the Nijalingappa cabinet.

From 1960 to 1978, he served as a Member of the Karnataka Legislative Council. While an MLC, he was appointed as the Minister of Law on 14 March 1962 and the Minister of Home on 7 June 1965.
