= Tiptur Assembly constituency =

Legislative Assembly constituency in Karnataka, India

Coordinates: 13.26°N 76.47°E

Tiptur
- Constituency No. 129 for the Karnataka Legislative Assembly

Constituency details
- Country: India
- Region: South India
- State: Karnataka
- District: Tumkur
- Lok Sabha constituency: Tumkur
- Established: 1951
- Total electors: 184,334
- Reservation: None

Member of Legislative Assembly
- 16th Karnataka Legislative Assembly
- Incumbent K. Shadakshari
- Party: Indian National Congress
- Elected year: 2023
- Preceded by: B. C. Nagesh

Tiptur Assembly constituency is one of the 224 constituencies in the Karnataka Legislative Assembly of Karnataka, a southern state of India. It is also part of Tumkur Lok Sabha constituency.

== Members of the Legislative Assembly ==
Election	Member	Party
1952	T. G. Thimme Gowda	Indian National Congress
1957	K. P. Revanasiddappa	Praja Socialist Party
1962	K. P. Revanasiddappa	Praja Socialist Party
1967	M. S. Neelakantaswamy	Indian National Congress
1967 By-election (Note: Died on 26/07/1967)	V. L. Sivappa	Praja Socialist Party
1972	T. M. Manjanath	Indian National Congress
1978	V. L. Sivappa	Indian National Congress
1983	S. P. Gangadharappa	Indian National Congress
1985	B. S. Chandrashekaraiah	Janata Party
1989	T. M. Manjanath	Indian National Congress
1994	B. Nanjamari	Bharatiya Janata Party
1999	K. Shadakshari	Indian National Congress
2004	B. Nanjamari	Janata Dal
2008	B. C. Nagesh	Bharatiya Janata Party
2013	K. Shadakshari	Indian National Congress
2018	B. C. Nagesh	Bharatiya Janata Party
2023	K. Shadakshari	Indian National Congress

== Election results ==
=== Assembly Election 2023 ===
2023 Karnataka Legislative Assembly election : Tiptur
Party	Candidate	Votes	%	±%
INC	K. Shadakshari	71,999	46.13%	▲22.50
BJP	B. C. Nagesh	54,347	34.82%	▼5.68
JD(S)	K. T. Shanthakumar	26,014	16.67%	▲5.44
NOTA	None of the above	635	0.41%	▼0.15
Margin of victory		17,652	11.31%	▼5.56
Turnout		156,179	84.73%	▲1.12
Total valid votes		156,069		
Registered electors		184,334		▲1.55
INC gain from BJP		Swing	▲5.63	

=== Assembly Election 2018 ===
2018 Karnataka Legislative Assembly election : Tiptur
Party	Candidate	Votes	%	±%
BJP	B. C. Nagesh	61,383	40.50%	▲8.22
INC	K. Shadakshari	35,820	23.63%	▼16.93
JD(S)	Lokeshwara	17,027	11.23%	▲6.87
Independent	K. T. Shanthakumar	13,506	8.91%	New
Independent	G. Narayan	8,689	5.73%	New
Independent	B. Nanjamari	6,212	4.10%	New
Independent	T. N. Kumaraswamy	3,018	1.99%	New
Independent	Mylari. M	2,348	1.55%	New
NOTA	None of the above	856	0.56%	New
Margin of victory		25,563	16.87%	▲8.59
Turnout		151,765	83.61%	▲1.75
Total valid votes		151,571		
Registered electors		181,513		▲5.84
BJP gain from INC		Swing	▼0.06	

=== Assembly Election 2013 ===
2013 Karnataka Legislative Assembly election : Tiptur
Party	Candidate	Votes	%	±%
INC	K. Shadakshari	56,817	40.56%	▲8.31
BJP	B. C. Nagesh	45,215	32.28%	▼5.63
KJP	Lokeshwara	28,667	20.47%	New
JD(S)	M. Lingaraju (Jakkanahalli)	6,104	4.36%	▼11.24
Independent	Veerabhadraiah. M. C	880	0.63%	New
BSP	Abdulwakeel	847	0.60%	▼6.01
Margin of victory		11,602	8.28%	▲2.63
Turnout		140,375	81.86%	▲3.85
Total valid votes		140,074		
Registered electors		171,491		▲10.06
INC gain from BJP		Swing	▲2.65	

=== Assembly Election 2008 ===
2008 Karnataka Legislative Assembly election : Tiptur
Party	Candidate	Votes	%	±%
BJP	B. C. Nagesh	46,034	37.91%	▲15.25
INC	K. Shadakshari	39,168	32.25%	▲3.46
JD(S)	B. Nanjamari	18,943	15.60%	▼29.24
BSP	M. Lingaraju	8,021	6.61%	New
Independent	Anandaravi. N. R	6,749	5.56%	New
Independent	G. B. Lokesh Mama	1,383	1.14%	New
Margin of victory		6,866	5.65%	▼10.40
Turnout		121,542	78.01%	▲4.90
Total valid votes		121,433		
Registered electors		155,811		▲8.63
BJP gain from JD(S)		Swing	▼6.93	

=== Assembly Election 2004 ===
2004 Karnataka Legislative Assembly election : Tiptur
Party	Candidate	Votes	%	±%
JD(S)	B. Nanjamari	46,996	44.84%	▲41.37
INC	K. Shadakshari	30,173	28.79%	▼20.49
BJP	B. C. Nagesh	23,747	22.66%	▼23.71
JP	M. Lingaraju	2,478	2.36%	New
Urs Samyuktha Paksha	Lokesh. G. B	1,405	1.34%	New
Margin of victory		16,823	16.05%	▲13.14
Turnout		104,860	73.11%	▼3.51
Total valid votes		104,799		
Registered electors		143,431		▲12.44
JD(S) gain from INC		Swing	▼4.44	

=== Assembly Election 1999 ===
1999 Karnataka Legislative Assembly election : Tiptur
Party	Candidate	Votes	%	±%
INC	K. Shadakshari	46,489	49.28%	▲19.46
BJP	B. Nanjamari	43,742	46.37%	▼0.74
JD(S)	M. Renukarya	3,276	3.47%	New
Independent	Basavaraju	832	0.88%	New
Margin of victory		2,747	2.91%	▼14.38
Turnout		97,740	76.62%	▲1.77
Total valid votes		94,339		
Rejected ballots		3,366	3.44%	▲1.95
Registered electors		127,558		▲1.22
INC gain from BJP		Swing	▲2.17	

=== Assembly Election 1994 ===
1994 Karnataka Legislative Assembly election : Tiptur
Party	Candidate	Votes	%	±%
BJP	B. Nanjamari	43,769	47.11%	▲38.57
INC	Annapurnamma Manjunath	27,708	29.82%	▼39.01
JD	V. L. Sivappa	14,077	15.15%	▲0.74
INC	Annadanaiah	4,946	5.32%	New
Independent	G. K. Basavaraju	871	0.94%	New
Kranti Sabha	B. S. Devaraju	723	0.78%	▼0.14
Margin of victory		16,061	17.29%	▼37.13
Turnout		94,325	74.85%	▼1.27
Total valid votes		92,915		
Rejected ballots		1,410	1.49%	▼1.92
Registered electors		126,016		▲4.46
BJP gain from INC		Swing	▼21.72	

=== Assembly Election 1989 ===
1989 Karnataka Legislative Assembly election : Tiptur
Party	Candidate	Votes	%	±%
INC	T. M. Manjanath	61,052	68.83%	▲21.43
JD	B. S. Chandrashekaraiah	12,783	14.41%	New
BJP	Kaa Borapa	7,579	8.54%	▲8.03
JP	M. Renukarya	6,233	7.03%	New
Kranti Sabha	Devarraju	813	0.92%	New
Margin of victory		48,269	54.42%	▲50.59
Turnout		91,832	76.12%	▼1.11
Total valid votes		88,705		
Rejected ballots		3,127	3.41%	▲1.71
Registered electors		120,634		▲28.23
INC gain from JP		Swing	▲17.59	

=== Assembly Election 1985 ===
1985 Karnataka Legislative Assembly election : Tiptur
Party	Candidate	Votes	%	±%
JP	B. S. Chandrashekaraiah	36,594	51.24%	▲49.21
INC	T. M. Manjanath	33,857	47.40%	▼5.55
Independent	K. Nagaraj	606	0.85%	New
Margin of victory		2,737	3.83%	▼17.66
Turnout		72,658	77.23%	▲4.83
Total valid votes		71,423		
Rejected ballots		1,235	1.70%	▼0.12
Registered electors		94,079		▲10.37
JP gain from INC		Swing	▼1.71	

=== Assembly Election 1983 ===
1983 Karnataka Legislative Assembly election : Tiptur
Party	Candidate	Votes	%	±%
INC	S. P. Gangadharappa	32,087	52.95%	▲42.81
Independent	V. L. Sivappa	19,064	31.46%	New
BJP	B. Siddaramaiah	3,369	5.56%	New
LKD	K. P. Revanasiddappa	2,354	3.88%	New
Independent	B. Shivakumar	1,532	2.53%	New
JP	V. G. Chathrapathi	1,232	2.03%	▼41.40
Independent	N. C. Ramesh	563	0.93%	New
Margin of victory		13,023	21.49%	▲18.50
Turnout		61,718	72.40%	▼8.72
Total valid votes		60,593		
Rejected ballots		1,125	1.82%	
Registered electors		85,240		▲11.22
INC gain from INC(I)		Swing	▲6.52	

=== Assembly Election 1978 ===
1978 Karnataka Legislative Assembly election : Tiptur
Party	Candidate	Votes	%	±%
INC(I)	V. L. Sivappa	28,339	46.43%	New
JP	M. R. Ramanna	26,511	43.43%	New
INC	P. Choudri Shankar	6,187	10.14%	▼18.03
Margin of victory		1,828	2.99%	▼30.01
Turnout		62,169	81.12%	▲10.30
Total valid votes		61,037		
Rejected ballots		1,132	1.82%	▲1.82
Registered electors		76,642		▼2.46
INC(I) gain from INC(O)		Swing	▼14.74	

=== Assembly Election 1972 ===
1972 Mysore State Legislative Assembly election : Tiptur
Party	Candidate	Votes	%	±%
INC(O)	T. M. Manjanath	33,192	61.17%	New
INC	V. L. Sivappa	15,287	28.17%	▼14.52
Independent	P. Choudri Shankar	3,295	6.07%	New
ABJS	Kaa Borapa	1,654	3.05%	New
Independent	K. P. Revanasiddappa	513	0.95%	New
Margin of victory		17,905	33.00%	▲18.39
Turnout		55,646	70.82%	
Total valid votes		54,262		
Registered electors		78,578		
INC(O) gain from PSP		Swing	▲3.86	

=== Assembly By-election 1967 ===
1967 Mysore State Legislative Assembly by-election : Tiptur
Party	Candidate	Votes	%	±%
PSP	V. L. Sivappa	26,742	57.31%	▲38.17
INC	T. M. Manjanath	19,923	42.69%	▼9.49
Margin of victory		6,819	14.61%	▼5.54
Total valid votes		46,665		
PSP gain from INC		Swing	▲5.13	

=== Assembly Election 1967 ===
1967 Mysore State Legislative Assembly election : Tiptur
Party	Candidate	Votes	%	±%
INC	M. S. Neelakantaswamy	19,056	52.18%	▲9.01
Independent	V. L. Sivappa	11,699	32.04%	New
PSP	K. P. Revanasiddappa	6,991	19.14%	▼37.69
Independent	T. T. Gowda	3,419	9.36%	New
Margin of victory		7,357	20.15%	▲6.48
Turnout		38,939	69.45%	▲11.01
Total valid votes		36,517		
Registered electors		56,066		▲0.21
INC gain from PSP		Swing	▼4.65	

=== Assembly Election 1962 ===
1962 Mysore State Legislative Assembly election : Tiptur
Party	Candidate	Votes	%	±%
PSP	K. P. Revanasiddappa	17,754	56.83%	▼0.36
INC	M. S. Neelakantaswamy	13,484	43.17%	▲0.36
Margin of victory		4,270	13.67%	▼0.70
Turnout		32,698	58.44%	▲0.69
Total valid votes		31,238		
Registered electors		55,951		▲15.04
PSP hold		Swing	▼0.36	

=== Assembly Election 1957 ===
1957 Mysore State Legislative Assembly election : Tiptur
Party	Candidate	Votes	%	±%
PSP	K. P. Revanasiddappa	16,063	57.19%	New
INC	T. G. Thimme Gowda	12,026	42.81%	▲3.85
Margin of victory		4,037	14.37%	▲1.16
Turnout		28,089	57.75%	▼1.60
Total valid votes		28,089		
Registered electors		48,638		▲12.70
PSP gain from INC		Swing	▲18.23	

=== Assembly Election 1952 ===
1952 Mysore State Legislative Assembly election : Tiptur
Party	Candidate	Votes	%	±%
INC	T. G. Thimme Gowda	9,980	38.96%	New
Independent	D. M. Chandrasekhar	6,597	25.76%	New
Socialist Party (India)	K. P. Revanasiddappa	4,760	18.58%	New
Independent	M. R. Sivappa	2,444	9.54%	New
KMPP	Gangamma	1,247	4.87%	New
Independent	M. B. Shankarappa	585	2.28%	New
Margin of victory		3,383	13.21%	
Turnout		25,613	59.35%	
Total valid votes		25,613		
Registered electors		43,157		
INC win (new seat)				

== See also ==
- List of constituencies of Karnataka Legislative Assembly
- Tumkur district
