= S. P. Muddahanumegowda =

Indian politician

Member of Parliament for Tumkur
- In office 26 May 2014 – 30 May 2019
- Preceded by: G. S. Basavaraj
- Succeeded by: G. S. Basavaraj

Member of the Legislative Assembly, Karnataka
- In office 1994–2004
- Constituency: Kunigal

Personal details
- Born: 8 June 1954 (age 72) Kunigal, Tumkur, Mysore State
- Citizenship: Indian
- Party: Indian National Congress
- Spouse: Kalpana (m. 1987)
- Children: 3
- Education: B.A., LL.B.
- Alma mater: J.S.S. College, Mysore and S.J.R. College of Law, Bangalore
- Occupation: Politician
- Profession: Advocate, agriculturist
- As of 28 June, 2016

Sobaganahalli Papegowda Muddahanumegowda (born 4 March 1954) is an Indian former advocate, former Judicial Officer and Member of Parliament in 16th Lok Sabha. He belongs to the Indian National Congress party.

== Early life and background ==
Muddahanumegowda was born to Karigowda alias Papegowda and Sharadamma on 8 June 1954 in Sobaganahalli, Tumkur District, Karnataka. He completed his B.A. and LL.B education from J.S.S. College, Mysore and S.J.R. College of Law, Bangalore.

== Political career ==
In the 2014 general election, Muddahanumegowda defeated the sitting Bharatiya Janata Party candidate G. S. Basavaraj by 74,041 votes and became a member of the 16th Lok Sabha representing Tumkur in Karnataka. He has previously worked as a judge for a few years and later as a member of the legislative assembly for ten years from Kunigal constituency in Karnataka.

On 2 September 2022, he resigned from Indian National Congress and Joined Bharatiya Janata Party, Karnataka in presence of Chief Minister of Karnataka Basavaraj Bommai, on 3 November 2022. In February 2024, he rejoined the Congress, and contested from Tumkur again in the 2024 general election.

== Personal life ==
Muddahanumegowda married Kalpana on 29 May 1987 and the couple has one son and two daughters.

== Positions held ==
#	From	To	Position	Party
1.	1994	1999	Member of Karnataka Legislative Assembly (1st term) from Kunigal.	INC
2.	1999	2004	Member of Karnataka Legislative Assembly (2nd term) from Kunigal.	INC
3.	2014	2019	Member of Parliament in 16th Lok Sabha from Tumkur.: Member of Committee on Subordinate Legislation.; Member of the Standing Committee on Industry.; Member of Consultative Committee, Ministry of Road Transport and Highways and Shipping.	INC
