= Chikkanayakanahalli Assembly constituency =

Legislative Assembly constituency in Karnataka, India

Coordinates: 13.4°N 76.6°E

Chikkanayakanahalli
- Constituency No. 128 for the Karnataka Legislative Assembly

Constituency details
- Country: India
- Region: South India
- State: Karnataka
- Division: Bangalore
- District: Tumkur
- Lok Sabha constituency: Tumkur
- Established: 1951
- Total electors: 218,952
- Reservation: None

Member of Legislative Assembly
- 16th Karnataka Legislative Assembly
- Incumbent C. B. Suresh Babu
- Party: JD(S)
- Alliance: NDA
- Elected year: 2023
- Preceded by: J. C. Madhu Swamy

Chikkanayakanahalli Assembly constituency is one of the 224 constituencies in the Karnataka Legislative Assembly of Karnataka, a southern state of India. It is also part of Tumkur Lok Sabha constituency.

== Members of the Legislative Assembly ==
Election	Member	Party
1952	C. H. Lingadevaru	Indian National Congress
1957	C. K. Rajaiasetty	Praja Socialist Party
1962	C. H. Lingadevaru	Indian National Congress
1967	M. S. Neelakantaswamy	Indian National Congress
1972	N. Basavaiah	Indian National Congress
1978	N. Basavaiah	Indian National Congress
1983	S. G. Ramalingaiah	Bharatiya Janata Party
1985	B. Lakkappa	Indian National Congress
1989	J. C. Madhu Swamy	Janata Dal
1994	N. Basavaiah	Karnataka Pradesh Congress Committee
1997 By-election	J. C. Madhu Swamy	Independent politician
1999	C. B. Suresh Babu	Janata Dal
2004	J. C. Madhu Swamy	Janata Dal
2008	C. B. Suresh Babu	Janata Dal
2013	C. B. Suresh Babu	Janata Dal
2018	J. C. Madhu Swamy	Bharatiya Janata Party
2023	C. B. Suresh Babu	Janata Dal

== Election results ==
=== Assembly Election 2023 ===
2023 Karnataka Legislative Assembly election : Chikkanayakanahalli
Party	Candidate	Votes	%	±%
JD(S)	C. B. Suresh Babu	71,036	37.65%	▲4.81
BJP	J. C. Madhu Swamy	60,994	32.33%	▼6.20
INC	K. S. Kiran Kumar	50,996	27.03%	▲1.63
AAP	Ningaraju. S. C	1,771	0.94%	New
NOTA	None of the above	778	0.41%	▼0.21
Margin of victory		10,042	5.32%	▼0.37
Turnout		188,680	86.17%	▲1.03
Total valid votes		188,657		
Registered electors		218,952		▲3.17
JD(S) gain from BJP		Swing	▼0.88	

=== Assembly Election 2018 ===
2018 Karnataka Legislative Assembly election : Chikkanayakanahalli
Party	Candidate	Votes	%	±%
BJP	J. C. Madhu Swamy	69,612	38.53%	▲17.75
JD(S)	C. B. Suresh Babu	59,335	32.84%	▼10.48
INC	Santhosh Jayachandra	45,893	25.40%	▲18.02
Indian New Congress Party	Ramachandraiah	1,154	0.64%	New
NOTA	None of the above	1,116	0.62%	New
Margin of victory		10,277	5.69%	▼2.25
Turnout		180,672	85.14%	▲4.07
Total valid votes		180,663		
Registered electors		212,217		▲6.96
BJP gain from JD(S)		Swing	▼4.79	

=== Assembly Election 2013 ===
2013 Karnataka Legislative Assembly election : Chikkanayakanahalli
Party	Candidate	Votes	%	±%
JD(S)	C. B. Suresh Babu	60,759	43.32%	▼3.37
KJP	J. C. Madhu Swamy	49,620	35.38%	New
BJP	K. S. Kiran Kumar	29,150	20.78%	▼5.69
INC	Sathish Sasalu	10,344	7.38%	▲4.64
KRRS	Kenkere Sathish	2,086	1.49%	New
BSP	Captain Somashekar	1,743	1.24%	▼0.15
Independent	C. M. Manjula Nagaraju	1,725	1.23%	New
Independent	Ramachandraiah Baraguru	1,648	1.18%	New
BSRCP	Devaraju. K. L	1,624	1.16%	New
Margin of victory		11,139	7.94%	▼12.29
Turnout		160,860	81.07%	▲3.00
Total valid votes		140,253		
Registered electors		198,417		▲7.68
JD(S) hold		Swing	▼3.37	

=== Assembly Election 2008 ===
2008 Karnataka Legislative Assembly election : Chikkanayakanahalli
Party	Candidate	Votes	%	±%
JD(S)	C. B. Suresh Babu	67,046	46.69%	▲3.64
BJP	K. S. Kiran Kumar	38,002	26.47%	New
JD(U)	J. C. Madhu Swamy	24,308	16.93%	▼27.81
INC	N. Renuka Prasad	3,941	2.74%	▼4.40
Swarna Yuga Party	Aruna. Y. M. Yalanadu	3,550	2.47%	New
Independent	K. S. Satish Kumar	2,327	1.62%	New
BSP	Hemashree. H. N	1,991	1.39%	New
SP	Ananthaiah	1,598	1.11%	New
Margin of victory		29,044	20.23%	▲18.54
Turnout		143,844	78.07%	▲4.22
Total valid votes		143,589		
Registered electors		184,261		▲41.46
JD(S) gain from JD(U)		Swing	▲1.95	

=== Assembly Election 2004 ===
2004 Karnataka Legislative Assembly election : Chikkanayakanahalli
Party	Candidate	Votes	%	±%
JD(U)	J. C. Madhu Swamy	43,040	44.74%	▲12.18
JD(S)	C. B. Suresh Babu	41,412	43.05%	▼6.28
INC	Krishnaiah N. @ Seemeyenne Krishnaiah	6,872	7.14%	▼10.98
JP	B. Lakkappa	2,510	2.61%	New
Kannada Nadu Party	Nagaraju. H. T	1,631	1.70%	New
Independent	Seebi Narasimaiah	730	0.76%	New
Margin of victory		1,628	1.69%	▼15.08
Turnout		96,195	73.85%	▼3.62
Total valid votes		96,195		
Registered electors		130,257		▲9.57
JD(U) gain from JD(S)		Swing	▼4.59	

=== Assembly Election 1999 ===
1999 Karnataka Legislative Assembly election : Chikkanayakanahalli
Party	Candidate	Votes	%	±%
JD(S)	C. B. Suresh Babu	43,961	49.33%	New
JD(U)	J. C. Madhu Swamy	29,018	32.56%	New
INC	H. M. Surendraiah	16,145	18.12%	▼3.41
Margin of victory		14,943	16.77%	▲11.67
Turnout		92,097	77.47%	▼3.41
Total valid votes		89,124		
Rejected ballots		2,852	3.10%	▲3.10
Registered electors		118,884		▲3.68
JD(S) gain from Independent		Swing	▲12.55	

=== Assembly By-election 1997 ===
1997 Karnataka Legislative Assembly by-election : Chikkanayakanahalli
Party	Candidate	Votes	%	±%
Independent	J. C. Madhu Swamy	33,768	36.78%	New
JD	C. B. Suresh Babu	29,089	31.68%	▲4.08
INC	B. Lakkappa	19,769	21.53%	▲3.71
BJP	Shankarappa	8,463	9.22%	▼1.26
Margin of victory		4,679	5.10%	▼10.78
Turnout		92,741	80.88%	▲2.02
Total valid votes		91,822		
Rejected ballots		903	0.97%	▼0.27
Registered electors		114,663		▲2.11
Independent gain from INC		Swing	▼6.70	

=== Assembly Election 1994 ===
1994 Karnataka Legislative Assembly election : Chikkanayakanahalli
Party	Candidate	Votes	%	±%
INC	N. Basavaiah	38,025	43.48%	New
JD	J. C. Madhu Swamy	24,140	27.60%	▼5.41
INC	B. Lakkappa	15,587	17.82%	▼14.40
BJP	S. G. Ramalingaiah	9,166	10.48%	▲9.70
Margin of victory		13,885	15.88%	▲15.09
Turnout		88,558	78.86%	▲1.52
Total valid votes		87,457		
Rejected ballots		1,095	1.24%	▼2.96
Registered electors		112,298		▲4.45
INC gain from JD		Swing	▲10.47	

=== Assembly Election 1989 ===
1989 Karnataka Legislative Assembly election : Chikkanayakanahalli
Party	Candidate	Votes	%	±%
JD	J. C. Madhu Swamy	26,291	33.01%	New
INC	B. Lakkappa	25,663	32.22%	▲0.24
JP	N. Basavaiah	25,317	31.78%	New
Independent	B. S. Channaiah	819	1.03%	New
BJP	B. B. Siddalingamurthy	624	0.78%	▼14.20
Independent	C. S. Narayana Rao	504	0.63%	New
Margin of victory		628	0.79%	▼3.08
Turnout		83,144	77.34%	▼1.95
Total valid votes		79,656		
Rejected ballots		3,488	4.20%	▲3.24
Registered electors		107,509		▲29.72
JD gain from INC		Swing	▲1.03	

=== Assembly Election 1985 ===
1985 Karnataka Legislative Assembly election : Chikkanayakanahalli
Party	Candidate	Votes	%	±%
INC	B. Lakkappa	20,815	31.98%	▼13.20
Independent	N. Basavaiah	18,297	28.11%	New
JP	J. C. Mahduswamy	14,513	22.30%	New
BJP	S. G. Ramalingaiah	9,750	14.98%	▼36.00
Independent	Mukkannappa	761	1.17%	New
Independent	Raghunath	520	0.80%	New
Margin of victory		2,518	3.87%	▼1.93
Turnout		65,714	79.29%	▲3.15
Total valid votes		65,080		
Rejected ballots		634	0.96%	▼0.62
Registered electors		82,877		▲6.92
INC gain from BJP		Swing	▼19.00	

=== Assembly Election 1983 ===
1983 Karnataka Legislative Assembly election : Chikkanayakanahalli
Party	Candidate	Votes	%	±%
BJP	S. G. Ramalingaiah	29,614	50.98%	New
INC	N. Basavaiah	26,243	45.18%	▲39.27
Independent	C. S. Narayana Rao	961	1.65%	New
Independent	B. Shankaralingappa	475	0.82%	New
Margin of victory		3,371	5.80%	▼9.79
Turnout		59,016	76.14%	▼7.40
Total valid votes		58,084		
Rejected ballots		932	1.58%	▼0.28
Registered electors		77,514		▲9.69
BJP gain from INC(I)		Swing	▼3.61	

=== Assembly Election 1978 ===
1978 Karnataka Legislative Assembly election : Chikkanayakanahalli
Party	Candidate	Votes	%	±%
INC(I)	N. Basavaiah	31,627	54.59%	New
JP	T. M. Majabath	22,594	39.00%	New
INC	B. Lakkappa	3,426	5.91%	▼40.48
Margin of victory		9,033	15.59%	▲11.08
Turnout		59,034	83.54%	▲19.05
Total valid votes		57,935		
Rejected ballots		1,099	1.86%	▲1.86
Registered electors		70,664		▲6.24
INC(I) gain from INC(O)		Swing	▲3.69	

=== Assembly Election 1972 ===
1972 Mysore State Legislative Assembly election : Chikkanayakanahalli
Party	Candidate	Votes	%	±%
INC(O)	N. Basavaiah	21,335	50.90%	New
INC	A. B. Mariappa	19,445	46.39%	▼40.84
Independent	K. L. Nananjaiah	1,134	2.71%	New
Margin of victory		1,890	4.51%	▲0.05
Turnout		42,896	64.49%	▼5.55
Total valid votes		41,914		
Registered electors		66,516		▲5.90
INC(O) gain from INC		Swing	▲4.61	

=== Assembly Election 1967 ===
1967 Mysore State Legislative Assembly election : Chikkanayakanahalli
Party	Candidate	Votes	%	±%
INC	M. S. Neelakantaswamy	19,056	46.29%	▼7.20
PSP	C. K. Rajaiasetty	17,220	41.83%	▲11.40
INC	C. H. Lingadevaru	16,852	40.94%	▼12.55
Independent	V. L. Shivappa	11,699	28.42%	New
PSP	K. P. Revannasiddappa	6,991	16.98%	▼13.45
Independent	T. T. Gowda	3,419	8.31%	New
Independent	C. S. A. Mitra	2,445	5.94%	New
Margin of victory		1,836	4.46%	▼18.60
Turnout		43,995	70.04%	▲9.90
Total valid votes		41,165		
Registered electors		62,812		▲11.99
INC hold		Swing	▼7.20	

=== Assembly Election 1962 ===
1962 Mysore State Legislative Assembly election : Chikkanayakanahalli
Party	Candidate	Votes	%	±%
INC	C. H. Lingadevaru	16,473	53.49%	▲12.31
PSP	C. S. Ananthaiah	9,371	30.43%	▼20.50
Independent	S. K. Channaveerappa	4,953	16.08%	New
Margin of victory		7,102	23.06%	▲13.30
Turnout		33,734	60.14%	▲0.37
Total valid votes		30,797		
Registered electors		56,088		▲14.93
INC gain from PSP		Swing	▲2.56	

=== Assembly Election 1957 ===
1957 Mysore State Legislative Assembly election : Chikkanayakanahalli
Party	Candidate	Votes	%	±%
PSP	C. K. Rajaiasetty	14,856	50.93%	New
INC	C. H. Lingadevaru	12,010	41.18%	▼1.69
Independent	K. S. Ramchandra Rao	2,301	7.89%	New
Margin of victory		2,846	9.76%	▲0.45
Turnout		29,167	59.77%	▼1.93
Total valid votes		29,167		
Registered electors		48,802		▲16.92
PSP gain from INC		Swing	▲8.06	

=== Assembly Election 1952 ===
1952 Mysore State Legislative Assembly election : Chikkanayakanahalli
Party	Candidate	Votes	%	±%
INC	C. H. Lingadevaru	11,042	42.87%	New
Independent	K. B. Mariappa	8,645	33.56%	New
Socialist Party (India)	K. N. Shankaralingappa	3,856	14.97%	New
ABJS	G. Kanchappa	1,264	4.91%	New
Independent	Rangappa	949	3.68%	New
Margin of victory		2,397	9.31%	
Turnout		25,756	61.70%	
Total valid votes		25,756		
Registered electors		41,741		
INC win (new seat)				

== See also ==
- List of constituencies of the Karnataka Legislative Assembly
- Tumkur district
