= J. C. Madhu Swamy =

Indian politician

Minister of Law & Parliamentary Affairs Government of Karnataka
- In office 4 August 2021 – 13 May 2023
- Chief Minister: Basavaraj Bommai
- Preceded by: Basavaraj Bommai
- Succeeded by: H. K. Patil
- In office 20 August 2019 – 21 January 2021
- Chief Minister: B. S. Yediyurappa
- Preceded by: G. Parameshwara
- Succeeded by: Basavaraj Bommai

Minister of Minor Irrigation Government of Karnataka
- In office 20 August 2019 – 13 May 2023
- Chief Minister: B. S. Yediyurappa; Basavaraj Bommai
- Preceded by: C. S. Puttaraju

Member of Karnataka Legislative Assembly
- In office 2018–2023
- Preceded by: C B Suresh Babu
- Constituency: Chikkanayakanahalli
- In office 2004–2008
- Preceded by: C B Suresh Babu
- Succeeded by: C B Suresh Babu
- Constituency: Chikkanayakanahalli
- In office 1997–1999
- Preceded by: N. Basavaiah
- Succeeded by: C B Suresh Babu
- Constituency: Chikkanayakanahalli
- In office 1989–1994
- Preceded by: B. Lakkappa
- Succeeded by: N. Basavaiah
- Constituency: Chikkanayakanahalli

Personal details
- Born: 5 August 1953 (age 73) JC Pura
- Party: Bharatiya Janata Party
- Other political affiliations: Karnataka Janata Paksha (2013-2018); Janata Dal (United) (1999-2013); Independent (1997–1999); Janata Dal (1988–1997); Janata Party (Till 1988)
- Education: University of Mysore (B.Sc.), Vidyodaya Law College, Tumkuru (LLB), MA

Jayachamarajapura Chandrashekaraiah Madhuswamy is an Indian politician who was the Minister of Law, Parliamentary affairs and Legislation and Minor Irrigation of Karnataka from 20 August 2019 to 13 May 2023. He was a member of the Karnataka Legislative Assembly representing Chikkanayakanahalli Constituency. Madhu Swamy belongs to Bharatiya Janata Party.
