= H. D. Ranganath =

Indian politician (born 1971)

H. D. Ranganath (born 28 July 1971) is an Indian politician from Karnataka. He is an MLA from Tumkur district representing Indian National Congress. He won the Kunigal Assembly constituency in the 2023 Karnataka Legislative Assembly election.

== Early life and education ==
Ranganath is from Kunigal, Tumkur district of India. He is the son of H. R. Doddaiah. A medical doctor by profession, he completed his master’s degree in orthopaedics in 2001 from J.C. Medical College, Mysore. Earlier, he did his M.B.B.S. at Kempegowda Institute of Medical Sciences, Bangalore from 1989 to 1996. He also married a doctor.

== Career ==
Ranganath won from Kunigal Assembly constituency representing Indian National Congress in the 2023 Karnataka Legislative Assembly election. He polled 74,724 votes and defeated his nearest rival, D. Krishna Kumar of Bharatiya Janata Party, by a huge margin of 26,573 votes. Earlier, he contested the Kunigal seat representing Indian National Congress and became an MLA for the first time as he won the 2018 Karnataka Legislative Assembly election. He polled 58,697 votes and defeated his nearest rival, D. Krishna Kumar of Bharatiya Janata Party, by a margin of 5,600 votes.

He is a renowned doctor and has performed free surgeries to a couple of poor patients in his constituency.
