= K. N. Rajanna =

Indian politician

Cabinet Minister Government of Karnataka
- In office 27 May 2023 – 11 August 2025
- Chief Minister: Siddaramaiah
- Ministry and Departments: Co-operation (excluding Agricultural Marketing)

President of the Karnataka State Co-operative Apex Bank Ltd.
- In office October 2001 – April 2005
- Preceded by: Kotoji Rao
- Succeeded by: M. N. Rajendra Kumar
- In office 12 August 2015 – September 2020
- Preceded by: R. M. Manjunatha Gowda
- Succeeded by: S. Ziyaullah

Member of Karnataka Legislative Assembly
- Incumbent
- Assumed office May 2023
- Preceded by: M. V. Veerabhadraiah
- Constituency: Madhugiri
- In office 2013–2018
- Preceded by: Anitha Kumaraswamy
- Succeeded by: M. V. Veerabhadraiah
- Constituency: Madhugiri
- In office 2004–2007
- Preceded by: R. Narayana
- Succeeded by: Seat abolished
- Constituency: Bellavi

Personal details
- Born: 13 April 1951 (age 75)
- Party: Indian National Congress (1972–2004, 2007–present)
- Other political affiliations: Janata Dal (Secular) (2004–2007)
- Spouse: Shantala

Kyathasandra N. Rajanna (born 13 April 1951) is an Indian politician from the state of Karnataka. He served as Cabinet Minister for Cooperation in the Second Siddaramaiah Ministry until his sacking in August of 2025. He is member of Karnataka Legislative Assembly from Indian National Congress (INC) representing Madhugiri. Having begun his career in the cooperative sector, Rajanna has previously served as director of National Agricultural Cooperative Marketing Federation of India and president of the Karnataka State Co-operative Apex Bank Ltd. In August 2025, he was removed from the Karnataka state cabinet for criticising Rahul Gandhi’s “vote theft” allegation.

== Biography ==
Rajanna was involved in the cooperative sector since 1972. His public life began around the same period when he served as secretary of the Kyathasandra taluk unit of the Indian National Congress. In 1976, he was elected president of the nagar panchayat Kyathasandra, before heading INC's Youth Congress wing of the Tumkur district-unit between 1980 and 1984.

Rajanna was elected to the Karnataka Legislative Council in 1998 and completed the six-year term till 2004. After being denied an INC ticket to contest the 2004 Legislative Assembly election from Bellavi, Rajanna quit the party and joined the Janata Dal (Secular) (JD(S)), with whose ticket he successfully contested. Rajanna entered the assembly again in 2013, this time from Madhugiri, and again in 2023. He served two terms as president of the Karnataka State Co-operative Apex Bank Ltd., the first from 2001 to 2005, and the second from 2015 to 2020. In May 2023, he was appointed a cabinet minister, and was handed the Cooperation portfolio (excluding Agriculture Marketing).
