= Sogadu Shivanna =

Indian politician

Minister of Environment Government of Karnataka
- In office 12 July 2012 – 13 May 2013
- Chief Minister: Jagadish Shettar
- Preceded by: J. Krishna Palemar
- Succeeded by: Ramanath Rai

Minister of Sericulture Government of Karnataka
- In office 25 January 2007 – 8 October 2007
- Chief Minister: H. D. Kumaraswamy
- Preceded by: Ramachandra Gowda
- Succeeded by: Venkataramanappa

Member of Karnataka Legislative Assembly
- In office 2008–2013
- Preceded by: Constituency created
- Succeeded by: Rafeeq Ahmed
- Constituency: Tumkur City
- In office 1994–2007
- Preceded by: S Shafi Ahmed
- Succeeded by: Constituency ceased to exist
- Constituency: Tumkur

Personal details
- Political party: Bharatiya Janata Party

Sogadu Shivanna is a senior politician associated with Bharatiya Janata Party, Karnataka. He has served as Minister of Environment under Jagadish Shettar and as Minister of Sericulture under H. D. Kumaraswamy.

== Political career ==
Shivanna contested 1994 Karnataka Assembly election on a BJP ticket from Tumkur City and defeated the sitting MLA S. Shafi Ahmed of Congress by a margin of 9104 votes. He went on to retain the seat in 1999 & 2004 election. He was inducted as a Minister in the Kumaraswamy cabinet which was supported by the BJP on 25 January 2007 and was allotted the Sericulture Department. In 2008 election, he managed to retain seat. In July 2012 he was inducted into the cabinet of Jagadish Shettar and was allotted Environment portfolio. He however lost 2013 election to the Congress candidate Dr Rafeeq Ahmed. In 2018 election he was denied ticket from Tumkur City in favour of G.B. Jyoti Ganesh at the behest of Yediyurappa since Shivanna did not join the KJP when it was formed by Yediyurappa.
