= Kunigal Assembly constituency =

Legislative Assembly constituency in Karnataka State, India

Coordinates: 13.02°N 77.02°E

Kunigal
- Constituency No. 131 for the Karnataka Legislative Assembly

Constituency details
- Country: India
- Region: South India
- State: Karnataka
- District: Tumkur
- Lok Sabha constituency: Bangalore Rural
- Established: 1951
- Total electors: 198,794
- Reservation: None

Member of Legislative Assembly
- 16th Karnataka Legislative Assembly
- Incumbent H. D. Ranganath
- Party: Indian National Congress
- Elected year: 2023
- Preceded by: D. Nagarajaiah

Kunigal Assembly constituency is one of the 224 Legislative Assembly constituencies of Karnataka in India.

It is part of Tumkur district. H. D. Ranganath is the current MLA from Kunigal.

== Members of the Legislative Assembly ==
Election	Member	Party
1952	T. N. Mudalagiri Gowda	Indian National Congress
1957	T. N. Mudalagiri Gowda	Indian National Congress
1962	Andanaiah	Independent politician
1967	G. Thammanna	Indian National Congress
1972	Andanaiah	Indian National Congress
1978	Andanaiah	Indian National Congress
1983	Y. K. Ramaiah	Janata Party
1985	Y. K. Ramaiah	Janata Party
1989	K. Lakkappa	Indian National Congress
1992 By-election	Y. K. Ramaiah	Janata Party
1994	S. P. Muddahanumegowda	Indian National Congress
1999	S. P. Muddahanumegowda	Indian National Congress
2004	H. Ningappa	Janata Dal
2008	B. B. Ramaswamy Gowda	Indian National Congress
2013	D. Nagarajaiah	Janata Dal
2018	Dr. H. D. Ranganath	Indian National Congress
2023	Dr. H. D. Ranganath	Indian National Congress

== Election results ==
=== Assembly Election 2023 ===
2023 Karnataka Legislative Assembly election : Kunigal
Party	Candidate	Votes	%	±%
INC	Dr. H. D. Ranganath	74,724	42.88%	▲6.63
BJP	D. Krishna Kumar	48,151	27.63%	▼5.16
JD(S)	Dr. Ravi Nagarajaiah	46,974	26.95%	▼0.52
AAP	Jayaramaiah Hithalapura	1,672	0.96%	New
NOTA	None of the above	630	0.36%	▼0.15
Margin of victory		26,573	15.25%	▲11.79
Turnout		174,409	87.73%	▲2.62
Total valid votes		174,277		
Registered electors		198,794		▲4.40
INC hold		Swing	▲6.63	

=== Assembly Election 2018 ===
2018 Karnataka Legislative Assembly election : Kunigal
Party	Candidate	Votes	%	±%
INC	Dr. H. D. Ranganath	58,697	36.25%	▲11.73
BJP	D. Krishna Kumar	53,097	32.79%	▲7.53
JD(S)	D. Nagarajaiah	44,476	27.47%	▼4.76
KRRS	Anand Patel Hulikatte	2,869	1.77%	New
NOTA	None of the above	830	0.51%	New
Margin of victory		5,600	3.46%	▼3.50
Turnout		162,074	85.11%	▲1.66
Total valid votes		161,923		
Registered electors		190,424		▲11.46
INC gain from JD(S)		Swing	▲4.02	

=== Assembly Election 2013 ===
2013 Karnataka Legislative Assembly election : Kunigal
Party	Candidate	Votes	%	±%
JD(S)	D. Nagarajaiah	44,575	32.23%	▲5.26
BJP	D. Krishna Kumar	34,943	25.26%	▼3.22
INC	B. B. Ramaswamy Gowda	33,918	24.52%	▼15.40
Independent	C. N. Ravikiran	24,604	17.79%	New
RPI	Dhanaraj Herur	1,280	0.93%	New
KJP	B. V. Prakash	1,029	0.74%	New
Independent	A. L. Nanjappa	926	0.67%	New
Margin of victory		9,632	6.96%	▼4.47
Turnout		142,569	83.45%	▲5.80
Total valid votes		138,317		
Registered electors		170,844		▲9.90
JD(S) gain from INC		Swing	▼7.69	

=== Assembly Election 2008 ===
2008 Karnataka Legislative Assembly election : Kunigal
Party	Candidate	Votes	%	±%
INC	B. B. Ramaswamy Gowda	48,160	39.92%	▲10.49
BJP	D. Krishna Kumar	34,366	28.48%	▲6.58
JD(S)	D. Nagarajaiah	32,545	26.97%	▼19.34
BSP	K. K. Ramakrishna	2,975	2.47%	New
Independent	Anitha	2,607	2.16%	New
Margin of victory		13,794	11.43%	▼5.45
Turnout		120,710	77.65%	▲3.36
Total valid votes		120,653		
Registered electors		155,450		▲2.01
INC gain from JD(S)		Swing	▼6.39	

=== Assembly Election 2004 ===
2004 Karnataka Legislative Assembly election : Kunigal
Party	Candidate	Votes	%	±%
JD(S)	H. Ningappa	52,370	46.31%	▲2.63
INC	S. P. Muddahanumegowda	33,280	29.43%	▼17.97
BJP	Suresh. B	24,766	21.90%	▲13.76
Margin of victory		19,090	16.88%	▲13.16
Turnout		113,200	74.29%	▲1.60
Total valid votes		113,086		
Registered electors		152,382		▲11.49
JD(S) gain from INC		Swing	▼1.09	

=== Assembly Election 1999 ===
1999 Karnataka Legislative Assembly election : Kunigal
Party	Candidate	Votes	%	±%
INC	S. P. Muddahanumegowda	45,659	47.40%	▲8.55
JD(S)	H. Ningappa	42,078	43.68%	New
BJP	B. Nagaraja	7,842	8.14%	▲4.37
BSP	Narasimhamurthy	625	0.65%	New
Margin of victory		3,581	3.72%	▼5.69
Turnout		99,353	72.69%	▼0.87
Total valid votes		96,327		
Rejected ballots		2,965	2.98%	▲1.87
Registered electors		136,676		▲2.07
INC hold		Swing	▲8.55	

=== Assembly Election 1994 ===
1994 Karnataka Legislative Assembly election : Kunigal
Party	Candidate	Votes	%	±%
INC	S. P. Muddahanumegowda	37,823	38.85%	▼4.89
SP	Y. K. Ramaiah	28,666	29.45%	New
JD	H. Ningappa	26,503	27.22%	New
BJP	K. C. Channabasappa	3,671	3.77%	New
Margin of victory		9,157	9.41%	▼3.11
Turnout		98,495	73.56%	
Total valid votes		97,353		
Rejected ballots		1,098	1.11%	
Registered electors		133,903		
INC gain from JP		Swing	▼17.41	

=== Assembly By-election 1992 ===
1992 Karnataka Legislative Assembly by-election : Kunigal
Party	Candidate	Votes	%	±%
JP	Y. K. Ramaiah	41,678	56.26%	New
INC	S. P. Muddahanumegowda	32,400	43.74%	▲2.88
Margin of victory		9,278	12.52%	▲11.18
Total valid votes		74,078		
JP gain from INC		Swing	▲15.40	

=== Assembly Election 1989 ===
1989 Karnataka Legislative Assembly election : Kunigal
Party	Candidate	Votes	%	±%
INC	K. Lakkappa	34,942	40.86%	▲7.52
JP	Y. K. Ramaiah	33,796	39.52%	New
JD	H. Ningappa	15,382	17.99%	New
Margin of victory		1,146	1.34%	▼31.06
Turnout		90,506	74.84%	▼1.01
Total valid votes		85,513		
Rejected ballots		4,993	5.52%	▲4.24
Registered electors		120,937		▲20.75
INC gain from JP		Swing	▼24.89	

=== Assembly Election 1985 ===
1985 Karnataka Legislative Assembly election : Kunigal
Party	Candidate	Votes	%	±%
JP	Y. K. Ramaiah	49,309	65.75%	▲7.20
INC	Andanaiah	25,007	33.34%	▼5.69
BJP	B. K. Venkatakrishmarao	683	0.91%	New
Margin of victory		24,302	32.40%	▲12.88
Turnout		75,968	75.85%	▲3.09
Total valid votes		74,999		
Rejected ballots		969	1.28%	▼0.61
Registered electors		100,154		▲12.53
JP hold		Swing	▲7.20	

=== Assembly Election 1983 ===
1983 Karnataka Legislative Assembly election : Kunigal
Party	Candidate	Votes	%	±%
JP	Y. K. Ramaiah	37,198	58.55%	▲18.61
INC	B. Rudraiah	24,799	39.03%	▲35.20
Independent	G. R. Nagaraju	846	1.33%	New
Independent	A. P. Rajachar	689	1.08%	New
Margin of victory		12,399	19.52%	▲6.15
Turnout		64,755	72.76%	▼3.81
Total valid votes		63,532		
Rejected ballots		1,223	1.89%	▼0.24
Registered electors		88,999		▲8.89
JP gain from INC(I)		Swing	▲5.23	

=== Assembly Election 1978 ===
1978 Karnataka Legislative Assembly election : Kunigal
Party	Candidate	Votes	%	±%
INC(I)	Andanaiah	32,654	53.32%	New
JP	G. Thammanna	24,463	39.94%	New
INC	Venkate Gowda. S	2,345	3.83%	▼63.89
Independent	Rahamathullakhan	1,286	2.10%	New
Independent	Sheshappa. K. V	498	0.81%	New
Margin of victory		8,191	13.37%	▼22.07
Turnout		62,577	76.57%	▲13.97
Total valid votes		61,246		
Rejected ballots		1,331	2.13%	▲2.13
Registered electors		81,730		▲44.22
INC(I) gain from INC		Swing	▼14.40	

=== Assembly Election 1972 ===
1972 Mysore State Legislative Assembly election : Kunigal
Party	Candidate	Votes	%	±%
INC	Andanaiah	23,499	67.72%	▲13.47
INC(O)	Mohammad Gaiban Khan	11,200	32.28%	New
Margin of victory		12,299	35.44%	▲17.20
Turnout		35,477	62.60%	▼4.21
Total valid votes		34,699		
Registered electors		56,669		▲15.83
INC hold		Swing	▲13.47	

=== Assembly Election 1967 ===
1967 Mysore State Legislative Assembly election : Kunigal
Party	Candidate	Votes	%	±%
INC	G. Thammanna	16,930	54.25%	▲26.93
PSP	Andanaiah	11,238	36.01%	▲15.22
Independent	T. N. Mudalagiri Gowda	3,037	9.73%	New
Margin of victory		5,692	18.24%	▼6.34
Turnout		32,689	66.81%	▼1.13
Total valid votes		31,205		
Registered electors		48,925		▼6.20
INC gain from Independent		Swing	▲2.35	

=== Assembly Election 1962 ===
1962 Mysore State Legislative Assembly election : Kunigal
Party	Candidate	Votes	%	±%
Independent	Andanaiah	17,410	51.90%	New
INC	T. N. Mudalagiri Gowda	9,165	27.32%	▼6.67
PSP	B. Thimmegowda	6,973	20.79%	New
Margin of victory		8,245	24.58%	▲18.98
Turnout		35,440	67.94%	▲15.86
Total valid votes		33,548		
Registered electors		52,161		▲10.30
Independent gain from INC		Swing	▲17.91	

=== Assembly Election 1957 ===
1957 Mysore State Legislative Assembly election : Kunigal
Party	Candidate	Votes	%	±%
INC	T. N. Mudalagiri Gowda	8,371	33.99%	▼9.60
Independent	Andanaiah	6,991	28.39%	New
Independent	B. Thimmegowda	5,596	22.72%	New
ABJS	Y. C. Nanjundaiah	2,749	11.16%	New
CPI	K. V. Krishnaswamy	921	3.74%	New
Margin of victory		1,380	5.60%	▼11.38
Turnout		24,628	52.08%	▼12.72
Total valid votes		24,628		
Registered electors		47,291		▲15.16
INC hold		Swing	▼9.60	

=== Assembly Election 1952 ===
1952 Mysore State Legislative Assembly election : Kunigal
Party	Candidate	Votes	%	±%
INC	T. N. Mudalagiri Gowda	11,598	43.59%	New
KMPP	B. Byrappa	7,081	26.61%	New
Socialist Party (India)	Chenuveere Gowda	5,041	18.95%	New
Independent	T. C. Chikkanna Gowda	2,888	10.85%	New
Margin of victory		4,517	16.98%	
Turnout		26,608	64.80%	
Total valid votes		26,608		
Registered electors		41,064		
INC win (new seat)				

== See also ==
- List of constituencies of the Karnataka Legislative Assembly
- Tumkur district
