= Madhugiri Lok Sabha constituency =

Former constituency of the Indian Lok Sabha

Coordinates: 13.7°N 77.2°E

Madhugiri
- Former Lok Sabha constituency

Constituency details
- Country: India
- State: Mysore State
- Established: 1967
- Abolished: 1976

Madhugiri Lok Sabha constituency was a former Lok Sabha constituency in Mysore State (Karnataka from 1967 to 1977). This seat came into existence in 1967 and ceased to exist in 1976, before 1977 Lok Sabha Elections. This constituency was later merged with Tumkur Lok Sabha constituency.

== Members of Parliament ==
- 1952-66: Constituency does not exist
- 1967: Mali Mariappa, Indian National Congress
- 1967: Sudha V Reddy, Indian National Congress
- 1971: K. Mallanna, Indian National Congress
- 1977 Onwards: Constituency does not exist

== Election results ==
=== 1971 ===
1971 Indian general election: Madhugiri
Party	Candidate	Votes	%	±%
INC	K. Mallanna	247,907	83.93%	
INC(O)	B. N. Ramegowda	36,914	12.50%	
Majority				
Turnout		304,314	56.46%	
INC hold		Swing		

== See also ==
- Tiptur Lok Sabha constituency
- Tumkur Lok Sabha constituency
- Tumkur district
- List of former constituencies of the Lok Sabha
