= M. D. Lakshminarayana =

Indian politician

Member of Karnataka Legislative Council
- In office 10 August 2012 – 9 August 2018
- Constituency: Nominated

Member of the Legislative Assembly, Karnataka
- In office October 1999 – May 2004
- Preceded by: H. B. Nanjegowda
- Succeeded by: M. T. Krishnappa
- Constituency: Turuvekere

Personal details
- Party: Bharatiya Janata Party (1990-present)
- Other political affiliations: Karnataka Janata Paksha (2012-2014)

M. D. Lakshminarayana is a Bharatiya Janata Party political activist and a former member of the Karnataka Legislative Council. He was nominated to the council.

== See also ==
- TA/DA scam
