= Tumkur City Assembly constituency =

Legislative Assembly constituency in Karnataka, India

Coordinates: 13.34°N 77.11°E

Tumkur City
- Constituency No. 132 for the Karnataka Legislative Assembly

Constituency details
- Country: India
- Region: South India
- State: Karnataka
- District: Tumkur
- Lok Sabha constituency: Tumkur
- Established: 2008
- Total electors: 258,925
- Reservation: None

Member of Legislative Assembly
- 16th Karnataka Legislative Assembly
- Incumbent G. B. Jyothi Ganesh
- Party: Bharatiya Janata Party
- Elected year: 2023
- Preceded by: Rafeeq Ahmed

Tumkur City Assembly constituency is one of the 224 constituencies in the Karnataka Legislative Assembly of Karnataka, a southern state of India. It is also part of Tumkur Lok Sabha constituency. It represents Tumkur City.

== Members of the Legislative Assembly ==
Election	Member	Party
2008	Sogadu Shivanna	Bharatiya Janata Party
2013	Dr. Rafeeq Ahmed. S	Indian National Congress
2018	G. B. Jyothi Ganesh	Bharatiya Janata Party
2023	G. B. Jyothi Ganesh	Bharatiya Janata Party

== Election results ==
=== Assembly Election 2023 ===
2023 Karnataka Legislative Assembly election : Tumkur City
Party	Candidate	Votes	%	±%
BJP	G. B. Jyothi Ganesh	59,165	33.79%	▼1.78
JD(S)	N. Govindaraju	55,967	31.97%	▼0.48
INC	Iqbal Ahmed	46,900	26.79%	▼3.36
Independent	Sogadu Shivanna	8,954	5.11%	New
NOTA	None of the above	1,131	0.65%	▼0.12
Margin of victory		3,198	1.83%	▼1.29
Turnout		175,356	67.72%	▲2.27
Total valid votes		175,085		
Registered electors		258,925		▼0.24
BJP hold		Swing	▼1.78	

=== Assembly Election 2018 ===
2018 Karnataka Legislative Assembly election : Tumkur City
Party	Candidate	Votes	%	±%
BJP	G. B. Jyothi Ganesh	60,421	35.57%	▲26.60
JD(S)	N. Govindaraju	55,128	32.45%	▲6.33
INC	Dr. Rafeeq Ahmed. S	51,219	30.15%	▲0.38
NOTA	None of the above	1,309	0.77%	New
Margin of victory		5,293	3.12%	▲0.66
Turnout		169,877	65.45%	▼0.34
Total valid votes		169,871		
Registered electors		259,542		▲23.35
BJP gain from INC		Swing	▲5.80	

=== Assembly Election 2013 ===
2013 Karnataka Legislative Assembly election : Tumkur City
Party	Candidate	Votes	%	±%
INC	Dr. Rafeeq Ahmed. S	43,681	29.77%	▼5.87
KJP	G. B. Jyothi Ganesh	40,073	27.31%	New
JD(S)	N. Govindaraju	38,322	26.12%	▲2.74
BJP	S. Shivannasogadu	13,159	8.97%	▼28.52
Margin of victory		3,608	2.46%	▲0.61
Turnout		138,424	65.79%	▲13.01
Total valid votes		146,725		
Registered electors		210,412		▲5.29
INC gain from BJP		Swing	▼7.72	

=== Assembly Election 2008 ===
2008 Karnataka Legislative Assembly election : Tumkur City
Party	Candidate	Votes	%	±%
BJP	Sogadu Shivanna	39,435	37.49%	New
INC	Dr. Rafeeq Ahmed. S	37,486	35.64%	New
JD(S)	Ravisha	24,595	23.38%	New
BSP	Veera Dilip Kumara	1,053	1.00%	New
Independent	Siddagangappa. T	831	0.79%	New
Margin of victory		1,949	1.85%	
Turnout		105,484	52.78%	
Total valid votes		105,192		
Registered electors		199,842		
BJP win (new seat)				

== See also ==
- List of constituencies of Karnataka Legislative Assembly
- Tumkur district
