= C. B. Suresh Babu =

Indian politician

C B Suresh Babu

Member of the Karnataka Legislative Assembly
- In office 2008–2018
- Preceded by: J. C. Madhu Swamy
- Succeeded by: J. C. Madhu Swamy
- Constituency: Chikkanayakanahalli
- In office 1999–2004
- Preceded by: J. C. Madhu Swamy
- Succeeded by: J. C. Madhu Swamy
- Constituency: Chikkanayakanahalli

Personal details
- Born: 16 February 1971 (age 55)
- Party: Janata Dal (Secular)
- Spouse: Smt Babitha
- Children: 2
- Parent(s): N.Basavaiah and Ratnamma
- Occupation: Politician and Agriculturist

Suresh Baabu C B is a politician from Karnataka, India. He is a leader of Janata Dal (Secular) and he is married to Smt Babitha. He won three times as MLA from Chikkanayakanahalli constituency.

== Political life ==
Babu entered politics by contesting by-elections in 1997 but lost to J. C. Madhu Swamy. In 1999 he became MLA of the Chikkanayakanahalli by defeating Madhu Swamy. Later he won two consecutive terms in 2008 and 2013. In 2018 Assembly elections he lost to J. C. Madhu Swamy. His father Late N Basavaiah was also a politician.
