= S. R. Srinivas =

Indian politician

Minister of Primary and secondary education, Govt of Karnataka
- In office 2018–2019
- Preceded by: Tanveer Sait
- Succeeded by: S. Suresh Kumar
- Constituency: Gubbi

Member of the Karnataka Legislative Assembly
- Incumbent
- Assumed office 2004 - Present
- Preceded by: N. Veeranna Gowda
- Constituency: Gubbi

Personal details
- Born: 13 July 1962 (age 64) Gubbi, Tumkur, Karnataka
- Party: Indian National Congress
- Spouse: Bharathi Srinivas
- Children: Dushyanth S Srinivas, Tejaswini S Srinivas
- Occupation: Politician
- Profession: Farmer, Business

S. R. Srinivas is an Indian politician from the state of Karnataka. He is a five term member of the Karnataka Legislative Assembly and has remained undefeated in all the 6 elections he has faced in his lifetime, including his initial Zilla Panchayath election in 2000. Gubbi Srinivas is the only Vokkaliga MLA to have won 5 consecutive legislative elections without ever facing an electoral defeat in the history of Karnataka politics.

S. R. Srinivas’ political journey began with Congress and his first electoral victory was in 2000 as Congress Zilla Panchayat Member and later won the assembly election in 2004 as independent candidate. His family is a true Congress family as his father Late RameGowda served as block Congress president for over 23 years from 1970s to late 1990s.

In the 2023 Karnataka Legislative Assembly elections, the Gubbi constituency received significant media coverage following Srinivas's departure from the JDS. The election was characterized as a high-profile contest between Srinivas and the JDS leadership under H. D. Kumaraswamy. Srinivas won the seat, while the JDS candidate finished in third place. This victory marked Srinivas's fifth consecutive term, making him the first MLA from the Tumakuru district to achieve this milestone.

Congress had lost previous 6 elections in Gubbi, also losing deposit in 2013 and 2018 general elections. With S. R. Srinivas contesting from the Congress party, INC won the seat after 34 years with a comfortable margin. The BJP campaign in Gubbi saw biggies like Prime Minister Narendra Modi, Home Minister Amit Shah, Karnataka Chief Minister Basavaraj Bommai. The JDS camp had former PM HD Devegowda and former CM H. D. Kumaraswamy campaigning extensively & repeatedly in Gubbi to bring down Srinivas.

After Gubbi Srinivas switched sides from JDS to Congress, JDS has come down to 2 seats in Tumakuru district (lowest ever) and Congress won 7 seats (highest after several decades). This also attributes to the popularity of Srinivas across the district.

Gubbi Srinivas was instrumental in bringing an end to ‘Operation Lotus’ in 2010 when he exposed how the then BS Yediyurappa led BJP Govt. offered him 50 crores of cash and Ministerial birth to switch sides. Srinivas recorded conversations with former Deputy Chief Minister R. Ashoka, Tumkur rural MLA B. Suresh Gowda, Turuverkere former MLA Masala Jayaram and released video clipping of the BJP offering him cash & power to switch to BJP. However, due to his secular ideology, he denied BJP’s offers twice in 2010 & 2019.

He is also the only MLA in the country to have received the prestigious Bravery Award from the President of India for saving the life of a child.

He was appointed chairman for Karnataka State Road Transport Corporation (KSRTC) on 26 January 2024.

== Constituency ==
He represents the Gubbi constituency.

== Political Party ==
He is from the Indian National Congress.
