= G. B. Jyothi Ganesh =

Indian politician (born 1975)

G. B. Jyothi Ganesh (born 1 May 1975) is an Indian politician from Karnataka. He is an MLA from Tumkur City Assembly constituency in Tumkur district. He won the 2023 Karnataka Legislative Assembly election representing the Bharatiya Janata Party.

== Early life and education ==
Ganesh is from Tumkur. His father G.S. Basavaraj is a five time MP from Tumkur. He completed his post graduate diploma in Management Science in 1999 at Sri Dharmasthala Manjunatheshwara Institute for Management, Mysore and then did B.E. in Mechanical Engineering in 1996 at Siddaganga Institute of Technology, Tumkur, which is affiliated with Bangalore University.

== Career ==
Ganesh won from Tumkur City Assembly constituency representing the Bharatiya Janata Party in the 2023 Karnataka Legislative Assembly election. He polled 59,165 votes and defeated his nearest rival, N. Govindaraju of the Janata Dal (Secular), by a margin of 3,198 votes. Earlier, he became an MLA for the first time winning the 2018 Karnataka Legislative Assembly election.
