= M. T. Krishnappa =

Indian politician (born 1971)

M. T. Krishnappa (born 10 june 1952) is an Indian politician from Karnataka. He is an MLA from the Turuvekere Assembly constituency in Tumkur district. He won the 2023 Karnataka Legislative Assembly election representing Janata Dal (Secular).

== Early life and education ==
Krishnappa is from Turuvekere, Tumkur district. His late father was M Thimmaiah a farmer. He graduated in Commerce in 1974 from a college affiliated with Bangalore University.

== Career ==
Krishnappa won from the Turuvekere Assembly constituency representing Janata Dal (Secular) in the 2023 Karnataka Legislative Assembly election. He polled 68,163 votes and defeated his nearest rival, Masala Jayaram of the Bharatiya Janata Party, by a margin of 9,923 votes. He first became an MLA in 2004, winning the Turuvekere Assembly seat on JD (S) seat. He won the 2004 Karnataka Legislative Assembly election defeating M. D. Lakshminarayana of Bharatiya Janata Party but lost the 2008 Assembly election which was won by Jaggesh of the Indian National Congress. However, he won the 2008 by election held on 27 December 2008. He regained the seat winning the 2013 Karnataka Legislative Assembly election but lost to A. S. Jayaram in the 2018 Karnataka Legislative Assembly election.
