= C. R. Basappa =

Indian politician (1913–1991)

Member of Mysore Constituent Assembly
- In office 1948–1950

Member of Mysore Legislative Assembly
- In office 1950–1952

Member of Lok Sabha
- In office 1952–1957
- Constituency: Tiptur Lok Sabha constituency
- In office 5 April 1957 – 31 March 1962
- Constituency: Tiptur Lok Sabha constituency
- In office 2 April 1962 – 3 March 1967
- Constituency: Tiptur Lok Sabha constituency

Personal details
- Born: 13 April 1913
- Died: 29 January 1991 (aged 77)
- Party: Indian National Congress

C. R. Basappa (13 April 1913 – 29 January 1991) was an Indian politician and he served as 3 times Member of Parliament (MP), represented the Tiptur in Lok Sabha the lower house of the Parliament of India. Secy. Congress Party in Parliament.

== Early life and background ==
C. R. Basappa was born on 13 April 1913 in Chikanaya Kanhalli of Mysore (in present-day Chikanaya Kanhalli, Karnataka). He obtained his B.A., B.T., LL.B. degree from Government High School Tumkur, Maharaja's College, Mysore and Government Law College, Bombay.

== Personal life ==
C. R. Basappa married C. R. Puttathayamma in 1937 and couple has 3 sons and 1 daughter.

== Position held ==
#	From	To	Position
1.	1948	1950	Member of Mysore Constituent Assembly
2.	1950	1952	MLA from Mysore
3.	1952	1957	MP (1st term) in 1st Lok Sabha from Tiptur
4.	1957	1962	MP (2nd term) in 2nd Lok Sabha from Tiptur
5.	1962	1967	MP (3rd term) in 3rd Lok Sabha from Tiptur

== Death ==
C. R. Basappa died on 29 January 1991 at the age of 77.
