= K. Lakkappa =

Indian politician (1929–1991)

Member of Mysore Legislative Assembly
- In office 1962–1967
- Preceded by: K. L. Narasimhaiah
- Succeeded by: Constituency did not exist
- Constituency: Hebbur

Member of Parliament in 4th Lok Sabha
- In office 1967–1970
- Constituency: Tumkur (Lok Sabha constituency) (Mysore State)

Member of Parliament in 5th Lok Sabha
- In office 1971–1977
- Constituency: Tumkur (Lok Sabha constituency) (Mysore State)

Member of Parliament in 6th Lok Sabha
- In office 1977–1979
- Constituency: Tumkur (Lok Sabha constituency) (Karnataka State)

Member of Parliament in 6th Lok Sabha
- In office 1980–1984
- Constituency: Tumkur (Lok Sabha constituency) (Karnataka State)

Personal details
- Born: 23 December 1929 Kondapura, Tumkur District, British India
- Died: 8 November 1991 (aged 61)
- Party: Indian National Congress (since 1970)
- Other political affiliations: Praja Socialist Party
- Spouse: Smt B G Puttamma
- Children: 4 sons and 2 daughters
- Parent: Shri Thope Gowda (father)
- Education: B.A. and B.L.
- Alma mater: Mysore University
- Profession: Advocate and Politician

Kondapura Lakkappa (23 December 1929 – 8 November 1991) was an Indian politician who was the Member of Parliament in the Lok Sabha, from the Tumkur in 1967 as a Praja Socialist Party candidate. In 1970, he joined the Indian National Congress and was re-elected as its candidate in 1971, 1977, and 1980 from the same constituency in Karnataka.

== Early life and background ==
K. Lakkappa was born on 23 December 1929 in Kondapura, Tumkur District. Shri Thope Gowda was his father. He completed his education in B.A. and B.L. from Mysore University.

== Political career ==
K. Lakkappa was associated with Praja Socialist Party and served as a Member of Mysore State Executive of Praja Socialist Party.

Later in 1970, He joined Indian National Congress and became a member of K.P.P.C. (Karnataka Pradesh Congress Committee) and A.I.C.C. (All India Congress Committee).

Lakkappa founded many educational instructions in the rural areas of Tumkur District. He also founded the Association of unemployed educated youth in Karnataka. He worked for the uplifting of poor farmers (Kisan), labours and youth living in rural areas of the country.

== Personal life and death ==
K. Lakkappa married Smt B G Puttamma and the couple had four sons and two daughters. He died on 8 November 1991, at the age of 61.

== Positions held ==
- Served as a Member of several Government committees at the Centre, Cardamom Board and Spices Development Board.
- Appointed as a Member of the Catering Committee in Indian Airlines by the Government of India.

#	From	To	Position
1.	1962	1967	Member of Mysore Legislative Assembly for Hebbur: Member of the Public Accounts Committee and Estimates Committee of the State Legislature.
2.	1967	1970	MP (1st term) in 4th Lok Sabha from Tumkur (Mysore State)
3.	1967	1968	Member of Maharashtra, Karnataka Border Disputes Committee constituted by Government of Karnataka.
4.	1971	1977	MP (2nd term) in 5th Lok Sabha from Tumkur (Mysore State)
5.	1977	1979	MP (3rd term) in 6th Lok Sabha from Tumkur (Karnataka State): Member of Committee on Public Undertakings.
6.	1980	1984	MP (4th term) in 7th Lok Sabha from Tumkur (Karnataka State): Member of Business Advisory Committee.; Member of Committee on Subordinate Legislation.
