= M. V. Veerabhadraiah =

Indian politician

M.V. Veerabhadraiah (born 8 March 1955) is an Indian politician. He is a Member of the Karnataka Legislative Assembly from the Madhugiri Assembly constituency since 2018. He is associated with the Janata Dal (Secular). He quit politics in 2022. He was an IAS Officer before joining politics.
