= B. C. Nagesh =

Indian politician (1959–2026)

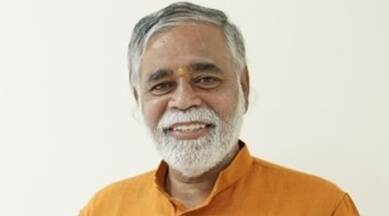

Minister of School Education and Literacy & Sakala of Karnataka
- In office 4 August 2021 – 13 May 2023
- Chief Minister: Basavaraj Bommai
- Preceded by: S. Suresh Kumar
- Succeeded by: Madhu Bangarappa

Member of Karnataka Legislative Assembly
- In office 2018 – 13 May 2023
- Preceded by: B H M Yashwanth
- Constituency: Tiptur
- In office 2008–2013
- Preceded by: B. Nanjamari
- Succeeded by: K. Shadakshari
- Constituency: Tiptur

Personal details
- Born: 1 July 1959 Chikkamagaluru, Mysore State, India
- Died: 18 August 2026 (aged 67) Bengaluru, Karnataka, India
- Party: Bharatiya Janata party
- Education: Bachelors of Engineering in Computer Science and Engineering
- Alma mater: B.M.S. College of Engineering, B.M.S. Institute of Technology and Management

Bellur Chandrashekharaiah Nagesh (1 July 1959 – 18 August 2026) was an Indian politician who was the Minister of School Education and Literacy & Sakala of Karnataka from 4 August 2021 to 13 May 2023. He was a two times Member of Karnataka Legislative Assembly from Tiptur.

== Early life and education ==
Bellur Chandrashekharaiah Nagesh was born in Chikkamagaluru, Mysuru State on 1 July 1959, to B.S. Chandrashekaraiah and B.C. Savithramma. He attained Bachelor of Engineering from B.M.S. College of Engineering and was part of the Akhil Bharatiya Vidyarthi Parishad (ABVP) during his student days.

== Political career ==
Nagesh joined the Bharatiya Janata Party in 1984. He was closely associated with B. L. Santhosh, the National General Secretary (Organisation) of the BJP.

He won the state assembly elections from Tiptur constituency in 2008 and 2018.

In 2021, he was inducted into the Basavaraj Bommai ministry and was made the Minister of Primary & Secondary Education.

== Death ==
Nagesh died after a brief illness at his daughter's house in Bengaluru, on 18 August 2026. He was 67.
