= S. Mallikarjunaiah =

Indian politician

10th Deputy Speaker of the Lok Sabha
- In office 13 August 1991 – 10 May 1996
- Speaker: Shivraj Patil
- Preceded by: Shivraj Patil
- Succeeded by: Suraj Bhan

Member of Parliament, Lok Sabha
- In office 1991 to 2009
- Constituency: Tumkur

Deputy Chairman of Karnataka Legislative Council
- In office 12 July 1990 – 02 July 1991
- Preceded by: Himself
- Succeeded by: B. R. Patil
- In office 10 April 1985 – 30 June 1990
- Preceded by: Dr. A. B. Malaka Reddy
- Succeeded by: Himself

Personal details
- Born: 26 June 1931 Tumkur, Kingdom of Mysore, British India
- Died: 13 March 2014 (aged 82) Tumkur, Karnataka, India
- Party: BJP
- Spouse: Jayadevamma
- Children: 1 son and 2 daughters
- As of 23 September, 2006

Siddananjappa Mallikarjunaiah (1931 – 2014) was an Indian politician. He represented the Tumkur constituency of Karnataka in Lok Sabha thrice, and was a member of the Bharatiya Janata Party (BJP).

He was Deputy Speaker of Lok-sabha in the Tenth Lok Sabha (1991–1996). He was elected to the Lok Sabha thrice from Tumkur in 1991, 1998 and 2004. He lost Lok Sabha election from Tumkur four times, in 1977, 1980, 1996, 1999. He started his political career as an MLC representing Tumkur on the Karnataka Legislative Council from 1971–1991 for Jana Sangh, Janata Party, and Bharatiya Janata Party. He also served as the Deputy Chairman of the council from 1980–1986. He was the State President of the Jana Sangh.

He was born in Tumkur on 26 June 1931. He died on 13 March 2014 in Tumkur at the age of 82 from a heart attack.
