= Hassan Lok Sabha constituency =

Constituency of the Indian parliament in Karnataka

Coordinates: 13.0°N 76.1°E

- Lok Sabha constituency
- Haasana Lok Sabha Constituency Map

Constituency details
- Country: India
- Region: South India
- State: Karnataka
- Assembly constituencies: Kadur; Shravanabelagola; Arsikere; Belur; Hassan; Holenarasipur; Arkalgud; Sakleshpur
- Established: 1952
- Reservation: None

Member of Parliament
- 18th Lok Sabha
- Incumbent Shreyas M. Patel
- Party: Indian National Congress
- Elected year: 2024

Lok Sabha Constituency Map by Assembly segments and Hoblis

Hassan Lok Sabha constituency Lok Sabha (lower house of Parliament) constituency is in Karnataka state in Southern India. The constituency was represented by Former Prime Minister H.D. Deve Gowda from 1991 to 1994, 1998 to 1999 and again from 2004 and 2014. This constituency comprises Hassan district and Kaduru Taluk in Chikmagaluru district.

== Legislative Assembly segments and demographics ==
Hassan Lok Sabha constituency currently comprises the following eight Legislative Assembly segments:

No	Name	District	MLA, from 2023	MLA's Party	Leading (in 2024 Lok Sabha)
127	Kadur	Chikmagalur	K. S. Anand	INC	JD(S)
193	Shravanabelagola	Hassan	C. N. Balakrishna	JD(S)	INC
194	Arsikere	Hassan	K. M. Shivalinge Gowda	INC	INC
195	Belur	Hassan	H. K. Suresh	BJP	JD(S)
196	Hassan	Hassan	Swaroop Prakash	JD(S)	INC
197	Holenarasipur	Hassan	H. D. Revanna	JD(S)	INC
198	Arkalgud	Hassan	A. Manju	JD(S)	INC
199	Sakleshpur (SC)	Hassan	Cement Manju	BJP	JD(S)

=== Demographics ===
The constituency has nearly 78% rural and 22% urban voter base. The electorate is nearly 90% Hindus, 5% Muslims and rest others. Scheduled Castes and Scheduled Tribes constitutes 21.5% in the constituency. Hassan is one of the Lok Sabha constituencies with Vokkaliga concentration in south Karnataka.

== Members of Lok Sabha ==
Year	Name	Party
1952-57 : See Hassan Chickmagalur
1957	H. Siddananjappa	Indian National Congress
1962	H. Siddananjappa	Indian National Congress
1967	N. Shivappa	Swatantra Party
1971	N. Shivappa	Indian National Congress
1974^	H. R. Laxman	Indian National Congress
1977	S. Nanjesha Gowda	Bharatiya Lok Dal
1980	H. N. Nanje Gowda	Indian National Congress (I)
1984	H. N. Nanje Gowda	Indian National Congress
1989	H. C. Srikantaiah	Indian National Congress
1991	H. D. Deve Gowda	Janata Dal
1996	Rudresh Gowda	Janata Dal
1998	H. D. Deve Gowda	Janata Dal
1999	G. Puttaswamy Gowda	Indian National Congress
2004	H. D. Deve Gowda	Janata Dal (Secular)
2009	H. D. Deve Gowda	Janata Dal (Secular)
2014	H. D. Deve Gowda	Janata Dal (Secular)
2019	Prajwal Revanna	Janata Dal (Secular)
2024	Shreyas. M. Patel	Indian National Congress

^By poll

== Election results ==
Vote share of Winning candidates
2024	49.67%
2019	52.96%
2014	44.44%
2009	50.64%
2004	50.72%
1999	46.39%
1998	39.41%
1996	41.35%
1991	37.61%
1989	54.15%
1984	49.52%
1980	49.20%
1977	49.70%
1971	62.33%
1967	57.20%
1962	46.03%
1957	%

=== 2024 ===
2024 Indian general election: Hassan
Party	Candidate	Votes	%	±%
INC	Shreyas M. Patel	672,988	49.67	
JD(S)	Prajwal Revanna	630,339	46.52	▼6.44
BSP	Gangadhar Bahujan	12,173	0.90	▼2.13
NOTA	None of the above	8,541	0.63	▼0.28
IND	7 Independent Candidates	14,809	1.09	
Others	5 Other Party Candidates	16,157	1.19	
Majority		42,649	3.15	▼7.91
Swing to INC from JD(S)		Swing		

=== 2019 ===
2019 Indian general election: Hassan
Party	Candidate	Votes	%	±%
JD(S)	Prajwal Revanna	676,606	52.96	▲8.52
BJP	A. Manju	535,282	41.90	▲27.46
BSP	K. H. Vinodraj	38,761	3.03	▲1.38
NOTA	None of the Above	11,662	0.91	▲0.27
IND	2 Independent Candidates	8,218	0.64	
Others	1 Other Party Candidate	7,023	0.55	
Majority		141,324	11.06	▲2.31
JD(S) hold		Swing		

=== 2014 ===
2014 Indian general election: Hassan
Party	Candidate	Votes	%	±%
JD(S)	H. D. Deve Gowda	509,841	44.44	▼6.20
INC	A. Manju	409,379	35.69	▲15.17
BJP	C. H. Vijayashankar	165,688	14.44	▼6.50
BSP	A. P. Ahamad	18,905	1.65	▼0.70
AAP	Santhosh Mohan	8,018	0.70	
NOTA	None of the above	7,334	0.64	
IND	6 Independent Candidates	14,411	1.26	
Others	3 Other Party Candidates	13,596	1.19	
Majority		100,462	8.75	▼20.95
JD(S) hold		Swing		

=== 2009 ===
2009 Indian general election: Hassan
Party	Candidate	Votes	%	±%
JD(S)	H. D. Deve Gowda	496,429	50.64	▼0.08
BJP	K. H. Hanume Gowda	205,316	20.94	
INC	B. Shivaramu	201,147	20.52	▼9.33
BSP	A. P. Ahamed	23,002	2.35	▼3.45
IND	9 Independent Candidates	54,454	5.55	
Majority		291,113	29.70	▲8.83
JD(S) hold		Swing		

=== 2004 ===
2004 Indian general election: Hassan
Party	Candidate	Votes	%	±%
JD(S)	H. D. Deve Gowda	462,625	50.72	▲20.84
INC	H. C. Srikantaiah	272,320	29.85	▼16.54
JD(U)	H. N. Nanje Gowda	86,940	9.53	
BSP	Aijaz Ahmed Farooqui	52,922	5.80	
IND	Kovibabanna	22,795	2.50	
KNDP	Siddesh Gowda	14,593	1.60	
Majority		190,305	20.87	▲4.36
Turnout		912,195		
Swing to JD(S) from INC		Swing		

=== 1999 ===
1999 Indian general election: Hassan
Party	Candidate	Votes	%	±%
INC	G. Puttaswamy Gowda	398,344	46.39	▲10.69
JD(S)	H. D. Deve Gowda	256,587	29.88	
BJP	B. D. Basavaraju	171,604	19.99	▼4.10
IND	Kovi Babanna	16,397	1.91	
IND	M. Chikke Gowda	15,694	1.83	
Majority		141,757	16.51	▲12.80
Turnout		892,801	73.36	▼0.38
Swing to INC from JD		Swing		

=== 1998 ===
1998 Indian general election: Hassan
Party	Candidate	Votes	%	±%
JD	H. D. Deve Gowda	336,407	39.41	▼1.94
INC	H. C. Srikantaiah	304,753	35.70	▲5.01
BJP	Susheela Shivappa	205,628	24.09	▼0.51
BSP	M. D. Gangaiah	6,116	0.72	
IND	U. M. Komalata	718	0.08	
Majority		31,654	3.71	▼6.95
Turnout		864,621	73.74	▲5.68
JD hold		Swing		

=== 1996 ===
1996 Indian general election: Hassan
Party	Candidate	Votes	%	±%
JD	Rudresh Gowda	313,241	41.35	
INC	S. M. Anand	232,454	30.69	▼6.46
BJP	K. H. Hanumegowda	186,338	24.60	▲3.11
IND	11 Independent Candidates	25,512	3.35	
Majority		80,787	10.66	▲10.20
Turnout		772,298	68.06	▲1.04
JD hold		Swing		

=== 1991 ===
1991 Indian general election: Hassan
Party	Candidate	Votes	%	±%
JP	H. D. Deve Gowda	260,761	37.61	▲8.86
INC	H. C. Srikantaiah	257,570	37.15	▼17.00
BJP	B. B. Shivappa	149,033	21.49	
IND	9 Independent Candidates	25,982	3.75	
Majority		3,191	0.46	▼24.94
Turnout		708,765	67.02	▼6.76
Swing to JP from INC		Swing		

=== 1989 ===
1989 Indian general election: Hassan
Party	Candidate	Votes	%	±%
INC	H. C. Srikantaiah	403,286	54.15	▲4.63
JP	H. N. Nanje Gowda	214,131	28.75	▼14.81
JD	S. Nanjesha Gowda	110,121	14.79	
IND	4 Independent Candidates	17,196	2.31	
Majority		189,155	25.40	▲19.44
Turnout		773,964	73.78	▲3.20
INC hold		Swing		

=== 1984 ===
1984 Indian general election: Hassan
Party	Candidate	Votes	%	±%
INC	H. N. Nanje Gowda	265,488	49.52	▲0.32
JP	K. B. Mallappa	233,519	43.56	▲15.55
IND	K. C. Basavaraj	28,792	5.37	
IND	3 Independent Candidates	8,312	1.56	
Majority		31,969	5.96	▼15.23
Turnout		546,793	70.58	▲7.30
Swing to INC from INC(I)		Swing		

=== 1980 ===
1980 Indian general election: Hassan
Party	Candidate	Votes	%	±%
INC(I)	H. N. Nanje Gowda	219,969	49.20	▼0.24
JP	B. B. Shivappa	125,221	28.01	▼21.69
INC(U)	G. L. Nallure Gowda	80,386	17.98	
JP(S)	S. Nanjesha Gowda	15,887	3.55	
IND	3 Independent Candidates	5,638	1.26	
Majority		94,748	21.19	▲20.93
Turnout		459,611	63.28	▼5.99
Swing to INC(I) from JP		Swing		

=== 1977 ===
1977 Indian general election: Hassan
Party	Candidate	Votes	%	±%
JP	S. Nanjesha Gowda	207,560	49.70	
INC	G. L. Nalluregowda	206,479	49.44	▼12.89
IND	H. P. Sannadevaiah	3,562	0.85	
Majority		1,081	0.26	▼28.90
Turnout		429,300	69.27	▲16.63
Swing to JP from INC		Swing		

=== 1971 ===
1971 Indian general election: Hassan
Party	Candidate	Votes	%	±%
INC	N. Shivappa	161,072	62.33	▲19.53
PSP	S. Shivappa	85,727	33.17	
SWA	H. B. Jwalanaiah	11,617	4.50	▼52.70
Majority		75,345	29.16	▲14.76
Turnout		268,070	52.64	▼13.05
Swing to INC from SWA		Swing		

=== 1967 ===
1967 Indian general election: Hassan
Party	Candidate	Votes	%	±%
SWA	N. Shivappa	168,620	57.20	
INC	H. Ramaswamy	126,168	42.80	▼3.23
Majority		42,452	14.40	▲11.85
Turnout		307,979	65.69	▲10.05
Swing to SWA from INC		Swing		

=== 1962 ===
1962 Indian general election: Hassan
Party	Candidate	Votes	%	±%
INC	H. Siddananjappa	104,898	46.03	
PSP	D. R. Karigowda	99,083	43.48	
IND	H. B. Gundappa Gowda	23,922	10.50	
Majority		5,815	2.55	
Turnout		241,184	55.64	
INC hold		Swing		

=== 1957 ===
1957 Indian general election: Hassan
Party	Candidate	Votes	%	±%
INC	H. Siddananjappa	Unopposed		
Turnout		0	0.00	
INC win (new seat)				

== See also ==
- Hassan Chikmagalur Lok Sabha constituency
- Hassan district
- List of constituencies of the Lok Sabha
