= Belur Assembly constituency =

Legislative Assembly constituency in Karnataka State, India

Coordinates: 13.16°N 75.86°E

Belur
- Constituency No. 195 for the Karnataka Legislative Assembly
- Map of Belur Assembly constituency

Constituency details
- Country: India
- Region: South India
- State: Karnataka
- District: Hassan
- Lok Sabha constituency: Hassan
- Established: 1951
- Total electors: 197,840
- Reservation: None

Member of Legislative Assembly
- 16th Karnataka Legislative Assembly
- Incumbent H. K. Suresh
- Party: Bharatiya Janata Party
- Elected year: 2023
- Preceded by: K. S. Lingesha

Belur Assembly constituency is one of the 224 Legislative Assembly constituencies of Karnataka state in India.

It is part of Hassan district. H. K. Suresh is the current MLA from Belur.

== Members of the Legislative Assembly ==
Election	Member	Party
1952	H. K. Siddaiah	Indian National Congress
1952	B. N. Boranna Gowda	Indian National Congress
1957	B. N. Boranna Gowda	Indian National Congress
1957	H. K. Siddaiah	Indian National Congress
1960 By-election	B. H. Lakshmanaiah	Indian National Congress
1962	B. H. Lakshmanaiah	Indian National Congress
1967	S. H. Puttaranganath	Swatantra Party
1972	S. H. Puttaranganath	Indian National Congress
1978	B. H. Lakshmanaiah	Janata Party
1983	D. Mallesha	Janata Party
1985	H. K. Kumaraswamy	Janata Party
1989	B. H. Lakshmanaiah	Indian National Congress
1994	H. K. Kumaraswamy	Janata Dal
1999	S. H. Puttaranganath	Bharatiya Janata Party
2004	H. K. Kumaraswamy	Janata Dal
2008	Rudresh Gowda	Indian National Congress
2013	Rudresh Gowda	Indian National Congress
2018	K. S. Lingesha	Janata Dal
2023	H. K. Suresh	Bharatiya Janata Party

== Election results ==
=== Assembly Election 2023 ===
2023 Karnataka Legislative Assembly election : Belur
Party	Candidate	Votes	%	±%
BJP	H. K. Suresh	63,571	38.76%	▲9.49
INC	B. Shivaramu	55,835	34.04%	▲8.09
JD(S)	K. S. Lingesha	38,893	23.71%	▼18.49
BSP	Gangadhar Bahujan	1,520	0.93%	New
AAP	H. P. Parvathe Gowda	1,010	0.62%	New
NOTA	None of the above	767	0.47%	▼0.26
Margin of victory		7,736	4.72%	▼8.21
Turnout		164,087	82.94%	▲3.02
Total valid votes		164,021		
Registered electors		197,840		▲3.83
BJP gain from JD(S)		Swing	▼3.44	

=== Assembly Election 2018 ===
2018 Karnataka Legislative Assembly election : Belur
Party	Candidate	Votes	%	±%
JD(S)	K. S. Lingesha	64,268	42.20%	▲10.71
BJP	H. K. Suresh	44,578	29.27%	▲21.43
INC	Keerthana Rudreshagowda	39,519	25.95%	▼11.29
Independent	Tholachanayka. B. D	1,170	0.77%	New
NOTA	None of the above	1,106	0.73%	New
Margin of victory		19,690	12.93%	▲7.19
Turnout		152,288	79.92%	▲3.86
Total valid votes		152,279		
Registered electors		190,544		▲8.98
JD(S) gain from INC		Swing	▲4.96	

=== Assembly Election 2013 ===
2013 Karnataka Legislative Assembly election : Belur
Party	Candidate	Votes	%	±%
INC	Rudresh Gowda	48,802	37.24%	▼1.78
JD(S)	K. S. Lingesha	41,273	31.49%	▲9.86
KJP	H. M. Viswanath	22,203	16.94%	New
BJP	Eshwarahally Lakshmana	10,281	7.84%	▼16.21
BSP	Gangadhar Bahujan	5,326	4.06%	▼5.98
Independent	Ramanna	1,499	1.14%	New
JD(U)	Channegowda	1,023	0.78%	New
BSRCP	Bujendra. B. R	830	0.63%	New
Margin of victory		7,529	5.74%	▼9.23
Turnout		132,992	76.06%	▲1.38
Total valid votes		131,059		
Registered electors		174,846		▲9.67
INC hold		Swing	▼1.78	

=== Assembly Election 2008 ===
2008 Karnataka Legislative Assembly election : Belur
Party	Candidate	Votes	%	±%
INC	Rudresh Gowda	46,451	39.02%	▲10.98
BJP	Shivarudrappa. B	28,630	24.05%	▼3.35
JD(S)	H. B. Appannaiah	25,747	21.63%	▼11.65
BSP	Yogesh. N	11,947	10.04%	▲3.66
Independent	E. H. Lakshmana	5,088	4.27%	New
Independent	B. M. Poornesh	1,170	0.98%	New
Margin of victory		17,821	14.97%	▲9.73
Turnout		119,070	74.68%	▲5.42
Total valid votes		119,033		
Registered electors		159,431		▲16.77
INC gain from JD(S)		Swing	▲5.74	

=== Assembly Election 2004 ===
2004 Karnataka Legislative Assembly election : Belur
Party	Candidate	Votes	%	±%
JD(S)	H. K. Kumaraswamy	31,438	33.28%	▲7.82
INC	D. Mallesha	26,489	28.04%	▼8.63
BJP	Gangadhara	25,884	27.40%	▼10.48
BSP	Yogesh. N	6,027	6.38%	New
JP	Kumar Kaliveer	2,487	2.63%	New
Kannada Nadu Party	Shivanna. D. S	1,250	1.32%	New
Urs Samyuktha Paksha	Puttaiah	885	0.94%	New
Margin of victory		4,949	5.24%	▲4.03
Turnout		94,565	69.26%	▼0.26
Total valid votes		94,460		
Registered electors		136,540		▲4.53
JD(S) gain from BJP		Swing	▼4.60	

=== Assembly Election 1999 ===
1999 Karnataka Legislative Assembly election : Belur
Party	Candidate	Votes	%	±%
BJP	S. H. Puttaranganath	32,770	37.88%	▲16.11
INC	D. Mallesha	31,724	36.67%	▲22.27
JD(S)	H. K. Kumaraswamy	22,024	25.46%	New
Margin of victory		1,046	1.21%	▼1.20
Turnout		90,807	69.52%	▲1.67
Total valid votes		86,518		
Rejected ballots		4,219	4.65%	▲2.91
Registered electors		130,629		▲7.44
BJP gain from JD		Swing	▲7.12	

=== Assembly Election 1994 ===
1994 Karnataka Legislative Assembly election : Belur
Party	Candidate	Votes	%	±%
JD	H. K. Kumaraswamy	24,927	30.76%	New
Independent	S. H. Puttaranganath	22,974	28.35%	New
BJP	Gangadhara	17,641	21.77%	New
INC	B. H. Lakshmanaiah	11,669	14.40%	▼32.33
INC	B. H. Venkata Swamy	2,820	3.48%	New
BSP	Doreyappa	853	1.05%	New
Margin of victory		1,953	2.41%	▼15.96
Turnout		82,497	67.85%	▼1.56
Total valid votes		81,050		
Rejected ballots		1,432	1.74%	▼4.49
Registered electors		121,588		▲8.07
JD gain from INC		Swing	▼15.97	

=== Assembly Election 1989 ===
1989 Karnataka Legislative Assembly election : Belur
Party	Candidate	Votes	%	±%
INC	B. H. Lakshmanaiah	34,220	46.73%	▲8.57
Independent	N. Srinivasa Murthy	20,764	28.35%	New
JP	H. K. Kumaraswamy	15,104	20.63%	New
Independent	Doreyappa	1,923	2.63%	New
Margin of victory		13,456	18.37%	▼2.26
Turnout		78,094	69.41%	▲1.66
Total valid votes		73,230		
Rejected ballots		4,864	6.23%	▲4.89
Registered electors		112,510		▲32.44
INC gain from JP		Swing	▼12.06	

=== Assembly Election 1985 ===
1985 Karnataka Legislative Assembly election : Belur
Party	Candidate	Votes	%	±%
JP	H. K. Kumaraswamy	33,382	58.79%	▲8.12
INC	H. K. Naraswmahaswamy	21,669	38.16%	▼0.97
BJP	H. M. Malleshappa	610	1.07%	▼0.52
Independent	Javaraiah	556	0.98%	New
Independent	G. S. Paramesh	496	0.87%	New
Margin of victory		11,713	20.63%	▲9.09
Turnout		57,552	67.75%	▲3.50
Total valid votes		56,782		
Rejected ballots		770	1.34%	▼1.17
Registered electors		84,949		▲5.12
JP hold		Swing	▲8.12	

=== Assembly Election 1983 ===
1983 Karnataka Legislative Assembly election : Belur
Party	Candidate	Votes	%	±%
JP	D. Mallesha	25,648	50.67%	▲0.56
INC	S. H. Puttaranganath	19,806	39.13%	▲34.04
LKD	K. Gopalaswamy	3,007	5.94%	New
BJP	Ramanna	806	1.59%	New
Independent	Basavaiah	619	1.22%	New
Independent	Puttaswamy	427	0.84%	New
Independent	H. N. Javaraiah	307	0.61%	New
Margin of victory		5,842	11.54%	▲6.23
Turnout		51,924	64.25%	▼9.94
Total valid votes		50,620		
Rejected ballots		1,304	2.51%	▼0.01
Registered electors		80,814		▲12.45
JP hold		Swing	▲0.56	

=== Assembly Election 1978 ===
1978 Karnataka Legislative Assembly election : Belur
Party	Candidate	Votes	%	±%
JP	B. H. Lakshmanaiah	26,045	50.11%	New
INC(I)	Udayakumar	23,286	44.80%	New
INC	S. H. Puttaranganath	2,647	5.09%	▼54.43
Margin of victory		2,759	5.31%	▼18.18
Turnout		53,321	74.19%	▲21.31
Total valid votes		51,978		
Rejected ballots		1,343	2.52%	▲2.52
Registered electors		71,868		▲18.83
JP gain from INC		Swing	▼9.41	

=== Assembly Election 1972 ===
1972 Mysore State Legislative Assembly election : Belur
Party	Candidate	Votes	%	±%
INC	S. H. Puttaranganath	18,283	59.52%	▲26.98
INC(O)	B. H. Lakshmanaiah	11,068	36.03%	New
SWA	Channakeshavaiah	1,367	4.45%	▼59.23
Margin of victory		7,215	23.49%	▼7.65
Turnout		31,980	52.88%	▲7.37
Total valid votes		30,718		
Registered electors		60,482		▲22.41
INC gain from SWA		Swing	▼4.16	

=== Assembly Election 1967 ===
1967 Mysore State Legislative Assembly election : Belur
Party	Candidate	Votes	%	±%
SWA	S. H. Puttaranganath	13,478	63.68%	▲58.80
INC	B. H. Lakshmanaiah	6,887	32.54%	▼28.15
ABJS	Kalasaiah	799	3.78%	New
Margin of victory		6,591	31.14%	▼14.19
Turnout		22,488	45.51%	▲10.66
Total valid votes		21,164		
Registered electors		49,410		▼13.37
SWA gain from INC		Swing	▲2.99	

=== Assembly Election 1962 ===
1962 Mysore State Legislative Assembly election : Belur
Party	Candidate	Votes	%	±%
INC	B. H. Lakshmanaiah	10,801	60.69%	▼6.57
ABJS	Ranga Boyi	2,734	15.36%	New
PSP	Kalasaiah	2,415	13.57%	New
Independent	Manjaiah Setty	978	5.50%	New
SWA	B. Hanumanthiah	868	4.88%	New
Margin of victory		8,067	45.33%	▲10.80
Turnout		19,880	34.85%	
Total valid votes		17,796		
Registered electors		57,037		
INC hold		Swing	▼6.57	

=== Assembly By-election 1960 ===
1960 Mysore State Legislative Assembly by-election : Belur
Party	Candidate	Votes	%	±%
INC	B. H. Lakshmanaiah	15,521	67.26%	▲10.57
Independent	Kalasaiah	7,554	32.74%	New
Margin of victory		7,967	34.53%	▲34.17
Total valid votes		23,075		
INC hold		Swing	▲36.84	

=== Assembly Election 1957 ===
1957 Mysore State Legislative Assembly election : Belur
Party	Candidate	Votes	%	±%
INC	B. N. Boranna Gowda	33,144	30.42%	▼36.82
Independent	Gurappa. B. G	32,755	30.06%	New
INC	H. K. Siddaiah	28,618	26.27%	▼40.97
Independent	Kalasaiah	10,720	9.84%	New
Independent	Devarajaiah	3,715	3.41%	New
Margin of victory		389	0.36%	▼10.80
Turnout		108,952	58.83%	▼40.86
Total valid votes		108,952		
Registered electors		92,605		▲14.36
INC hold		Swing	▼5.21	

=== Assembly Election 1952 ===
1952 Mysore State Legislative Assembly election : Belur
Party	Candidate	Votes	%	±%
INC	H. K. Siddaiah	28,761	35.63%	New
INC	B. N. Boranna Gowda	25,516	31.61%	New
KMPP	Y. Dharmappa	19,754	24.47%	New
KMPP	Veerabhadraiah	6,691	8.29%	New
Margin of victory		9,007	11.16%	
Turnout		80,722	49.84%	
Total valid votes		80,722		
Registered electors		80,974		
INC win (new seat)				

== See also ==
- List of constituencies of the Karnataka Legislative Assembly
- Hassan district
