= Hassan Assembly constituency =

Karnataka state constituency

Coordinates: 13.01°N 76.10°E

Hassan
- Constituency No. 196 for the Karnataka Legislative Assembly
- Map of Hassan Assembly constituency

Constituency details
- Country: India
- Region: South India
- State: Karnataka
- District: Hassan
- Lok Sabha constituency: Hassan
- Established: 1956
- Total electors: 228,436 (2023)
- Reservation: None

Member of Legislative Assembly
- 16th Karnataka Legislative Assembly
- Incumbent Swaroop Prakash
- Party: JD(S)
- Alliance: NDA
- Elected year: 2023
- Preceded by: Preetham J. Gowda

Hassan Assembly constituency is one of the 224 seats in Karnataka state assembly in India. It is part of Hassan Lok Sabha constituency.

K. H. Hanumegowda (1930-2018) and H. S. Prakash have won this seat four times each. Hanumegowda lost three elections from here, in 1983 and 1994 as Congress candidate, and in 2008 as Bahujan Samaj Party candidate. H. S. Prakash lost in 1999 and 2018.

== Members of the Legislative Assembly ==
| Election | Member | Party |
|---|---|---|
| 1952 | D. R. Kari Gowda | Indian National Congress |
| 1957 | K. T. Dasappa | Independent politician |
| 1962 | Yashodharamma | Indian National Congress |
| 1967 | H. B. Jwalaniah | Swatantra Party |
| 1972 | K. H. Hanume Gowda | Indian National Congress |
| 1978 | K. H. Hanume Gowda | Indian National Congress |
| 1983 | B. V. Kari Gowda | Janata Party |
| 1985 | B. V. Kari Gowda | Janata Party |
| 1989 | K. H. Hanume Gowda | Indian National Congress |
| 1994 | H. S. Prakash | Janata Dal |
| 1999 | K. H. Hanume Gowda | Bharatiya Janata Party |
| 2004 | H. S. Prakash | Janata Dal |
| 2008 | H. S. Prakash | Janata Dal |
| 2013 | H. S. Prakash | Janata Dal |
| 2018 | Preetham J. Gowda | Bharatiya Janata Party |
| 2023 | Swaroop Prakash | Janata Dal |

== Election results ==
=== Assembly Election 2023 ===
2023 Karnataka Legislative Assembly election : Hassan
| Party | Candidate | Votes | % | ±% |
|---|---|---|---|---|
| JD(S) | Swaroop Prakash | 85,176 | 49.80% | ▲17.20 |
| BJP | Preetham J. Gowda | 77,322 | 45.21% | ▲4.19 |
| INC | Banavase Rangaswamy | 4,305 | 2.52% | ▼22.15 |
| AAP | Agile Yogish | 1,301 | 0.76% | New |
| NOTA | None of the above | 889 | 0.52% | ▼0.10 |
| Margin of victory | | 7,854 | 4.59% | ▼3.83 |
| Turnout | | 171,175 | 74.93% | ▲2.38 |
| Total valid votes | | 171,038 | | |
| Registered electors | | 228,436 | | ▲7.27 |
| JD(S) gain from BJP | | Swing | ▲8.78 | |

=== Assembly Election 2018 ===
2018 Karnataka Legislative Assembly election : Hassan
| Party | Candidate | Votes | % | ±% |
|---|---|---|---|---|
| BJP | Preetham J. Gowda | 63,348 | 41.02% | ▲37.27 |
| JD(S) | H. S. Prakash | 50,342 | 32.60% | ▼5.18 |
| INC | H. K. Mahesh | 38,101 | 24.67% | ▼10.53 |
| NOTA | None of the above | 953 | 0.62% | New |
| Margin of victory | | 13,006 | 8.42% | ▲5.83 |
| Turnout | | 154,498 | 72.55% | ▲2.98 |
| Total valid votes | | 154,438 | | |
| Registered electors | | 212,952 | | ▲13.01 |
| BJP gain from JD(S) | | Swing | ▲3.24 | |

=== Assembly Election 2013 ===
2013 Karnataka Legislative Assembly election : Hassan
| Party | Candidate | Votes | % | ±% |
|---|---|---|---|---|
| JD(S) | H. S. Prakash | 61,306 | 37.78% | ▼8.83 |
| INC | H. K. Mahesh | 57,110 | 35.20% | ▲3.58 |
| BJP | Guruprasad @ Picture Palace Guruji | 6,083 | 3.75% | ▼14.08 |
| Independent | A. P. Ahamad | 1,299 | 0.80% | New |
| Margin of victory | | 4,196 | 2.59% | ▼12.39 |
| Turnout | | 131,100 | 69.57% | ▲3.36 |
| Total valid votes | | 162,263 | | |
| Registered electors | | 188,430 | | ▲11.04 |
| JD(S) hold | | Swing | ▼8.83 | |

=== Assembly Election 2008 ===
2008 Karnataka Legislative Assembly election : Hassan
| Party | Candidate | Votes | % | ±% |
|---|---|---|---|---|
| JD(S) | H. S. Prakash | 52,266 | 46.61% | ▼3.02 |
| INC | B. Shivaramu | 35,462 | 31.62% | ▲3.65 |
| BJP | H. K. Suresh | 19,991 | 17.83% | ▲2.83 |
| BSP | K. H. Hanume Gowda | 2,202 | 1.96% | ▼1.23 |
| Independent | G. P. Santhosh Gupta | 1,376 | 1.23% | New |
| Margin of victory | | 16,804 | 14.98% | ▼6.68 |
| Turnout | | 112,355 | 66.21% | ▲4.11 |
| Total valid votes | | 112,146 | | |
| Registered electors | | 169,692 | | ▼17.80 |
| JD(S) hold | | Swing | ▼3.02 | |

=== Assembly Election 2004 ===
2004 Karnataka Legislative Assembly election : Hassan
| Party | Candidate | Votes | % | ±% |
|---|---|---|---|---|
| JD(S) | H. S. Prakash | 63,527 | 49.63% | ▲21.77 |
| INC | K. M. Rajegowda | 35,804 | 27.97% | ▼1.36 |
| BJP | Karigowda. B. V | 19,205 | 15.00% | ▼19.06 |
| BSP | Muzammil Sherief | 4,085 | 3.19% | New |
| JP | Girishkumar | 3,179 | 2.48% | New |
| Kannada Nadu Party | Hullivare Srinivasa | 2,199 | 1.72% | New |
| Margin of victory | | 27,723 | 21.66% | ▲16.93 |
| Turnout | | 128,192 | 62.10% | ▼3.72 |
| Total valid votes | | 127,999 | | |
| Registered electors | | 206,428 | | ▲7.49 |
| JD(S) gain from BJP | | Swing | ▲15.57 | |

=== Assembly Election 1999 ===
1999 Karnataka Legislative Assembly election : Hassan
| Party | Candidate | Votes | % | ±% |
|---|---|---|---|---|
| BJP | K. H. Hanume Gowda | 40,378 | 34.06% | ▲25.60 |
| INC | K. M. Rajegowda | 34,774 | 29.33% | ▼8.95 |
| JD(S) | H. S. Prakash | 33,029 | 27.86% | New |
| Independent | B. K. Rangaswamy | 10,160 | 8.57% | New |
| Margin of victory | | 5,604 | 4.73% | ▼6.45 |
| Turnout | | 126,392 | 65.82% | ▼0.80 |
| Total valid votes | | 118,557 | | |
| Rejected ballots | | 7,777 | 6.15% | ▲4.49 |
| Registered electors | | 192,041 | | ▲12.90 |
| BJP gain from JD | | Swing | ▼15.40 | |

=== Assembly Election 1994 ===
1994 Karnataka Legislative Assembly election : Hassan
| Party | Candidate | Votes | % | ±% |
|---|---|---|---|---|
| JD | H. S. Prakash | 55,121 | 49.46% | ▲41.43 |
| INC | K. H. Hanume Gowda | 42,658 | 38.28% | ▼26.66 |
| BJP | Chowdavalli Puttaraju | 9,428 | 8.46% | ▲6.63 |
| INC | H. A. Rangegowda | 1,826 | 1.64% | New |
| JP | M. D. Chandrashekar | 1,146 | 1.03% | New |
| Margin of victory | | 12,463 | 11.18% | ▼29.76 |
| Turnout | | 113,325 | 66.62% | ▼0.11 |
| Total valid votes | | 111,443 | | |
| Rejected ballots | | 1,882 | 1.66% | ▼1.71 |
| Registered electors | | 170,094 | | ▲4.41 |
| JD gain from INC | | Swing | ▼15.48 | |

=== Assembly Election 1989 ===
1989 Karnataka Legislative Assembly election : Hassan
| Party | Candidate | Votes | % | ±% |
|---|---|---|---|---|
| INC | K. H. Hanume Gowda | 68,210 | 64.94% | ▲24.41 |
| JP | Karigowda. B. V | 25,209 | 24.00% | New |
| JD | Vasanta Kumar. M. S | 8,431 | 8.03% | New |
| BJP | Manjunath. S | 1,923 | 1.83% | ▼1.57 |
| Independent | Fiaz Ahmed Shariff | 867 | 0.83% | New |
| Margin of victory | | 43,001 | 40.94% | ▲27.48 |
| Turnout | | 108,701 | 66.73% | ▼1.41 |
| Total valid votes | | 105,036 | | |
| Rejected ballots | | 3,665 | 3.37% | ▲1.86 |
| Registered electors | | 162,903 | | ▲35.21 |
| INC gain from JP | | Swing | ▲10.95 | |

=== Assembly Election 1985 ===
1985 Karnataka Legislative Assembly election : Hassan
| Party | Candidate | Votes | % | ±% |
|---|---|---|---|---|
| JP | B. V. Kari Gowda | 43,650 | 53.99% | ▲14.52 |
| INC | G. L. Nallure Gowda | 32,769 | 40.53% | ▲7.33 |
| BJP | B. R. Krishnamurthy | 2,753 | 3.40% | ▼11.27 |
| Independent | M. B. Channabassappa | 607 | 0.75% | New |
| Margin of victory | | 10,881 | 13.46% | ▲7.19 |
| Turnout | | 82,094 | 68.14% | ▲4.66 |
| Total valid votes | | 80,852 | | |
| Rejected ballots | | 1,242 | 1.51% | ▼0.93 |
| Registered electors | | 120,483 | | ▲18.22 |
| JP hold | | Swing | ▲14.52 | |

=== Assembly Election 1983 ===
1983 Karnataka Legislative Assembly election : Hassan
| Party | Candidate | Votes | % | ±% |
|---|---|---|---|---|
| JP | B. V. Kari Gowda | 24,911 | 39.47% | ▲0.04 |
| INC | K. H. Hanume Gowda | 20,952 | 33.20% | ▲30.26 |
| BJP | M. T. Venkatarame Howda | 9,256 | 14.67% | New |
| Independent | H. B. Jwalaniah | 4,445 | 7.04% | New |
| LKD | Anne Gowda. M. L | 1,986 | 3.15% | New |
| Independent | G. R. Gunde Gowda | 1,049 | 1.66% | New |
| Independent | M. B. Channabassappa | 516 | 0.82% | New |
| Margin of victory | | 3,959 | 6.27% | ▼9.05 |
| Turnout | | 64,696 | 63.48% | ▼6.70 |
| Total valid votes | | 63,115 | | |
| Rejected ballots | | 1,581 | 2.44% | ▲0.34 |
| Registered electors | | 101,916 | | ▲11.63 |
| JP gain from INC(I) | | Swing | ▼15.28 | |

=== Assembly Election 1978 ===
1978 Karnataka Legislative Assembly election : Hassan
| Party | Candidate | Votes | % | ±% |
|---|---|---|---|---|
| INC(I) | K. H. Hanume Gowda | 34,344 | 54.75% | New |
| JP | Munivenkate Gowda. A. C | 24,731 | 39.43% | New |
| INC | Thimmegowda Kabbathi | 1,847 | 2.94% | ▼41.14 |
| Independent | Sharma. B. A. N | 783 | 1.25% | New |
| Independent | Seshachar. G. B | 393 | 0.63% | New |
| Margin of victory | | 9,613 | 15.32% | ▲9.52 |
| Turnout | | 64,072 | 70.18% | ▲13.95 |
| Total valid votes | | 62,728 | | |
| Rejected ballots | | 1,344 | 2.10% | ▲2.10 |
| Registered electors | | 91,297 | | ▲21.68 |
| INC(I) gain from INC(O) | | Swing | ▲4.86 | |

=== Assembly Election 1972 ===
1972 Mysore State Legislative Assembly election : Hassan
| Party | Candidate | Votes | % | ±% |
|---|---|---|---|---|
| INC(O) | K. H. Hanume Gowda | 20,464 | 49.89% | New |
| INC | G. A. Thimmappagowda | 18,083 | 44.08% | ▼4.52 |
| ABJS | B. L. Krishna Murthy | 2,473 | 6.03% | ▲3.98 |
| Margin of victory | | 2,381 | 5.80% | ▲5.04 |
| Turnout | | 42,193 | 56.23% | ▼7.99 |
| Total valid votes | | 41,020 | | |
| Registered electors | | 75,032 | | ▲22.59 |
| INC(O) gain from SWA | | Swing | ▲0.54 | |

=== Assembly Election 1967 ===
1967 Mysore State Legislative Assembly election : Hassan
| Party | Candidate | Votes | % | ±% |
|---|---|---|---|---|
| SWA | H. B. Jwalaniah | 18,212 | 49.35% | ▲48.27 |
| INC | L. T. Karle | 17,933 | 48.60% | ▲7.13 |
| ABJS | S. S. Ram | 757 | 2.05% | New |
| Margin of victory | | 279 | 0.76% | ▼7.29 |
| Turnout | | 39,306 | 64.22% | ▲7.00 |
| Total valid votes | | 36,902 | | |
| Registered electors | | 61,208 | | ▲16.10 |
| SWA gain from INC | | Swing | ▲7.88 | |

=== Assembly Election 1962 ===
1962 Mysore State Legislative Assembly election : Hassan
| Party | Candidate | Votes | % | ±% |
|---|---|---|---|---|
| INC | Yashodharamma | 11,498 | 41.47% | ▼1.99 |
| Independent | H. B. Jwalaniah | 9,265 | 33.42% | New |
| PSP | M. R. Puttaswamiah | 6,166 | 22.24% | New |
| ABJS | G. R. Ramachandra Iyer | 498 | 1.80% | New |
| SWA | S. V. Shama Rao | 300 | 1.08% | New |
| Margin of victory | | 2,233 | 8.05% | ▼2.50 |
| Turnout | | 30,169 | 57.22% | ▼9.34 |
| Total valid votes | | 27,727 | | |
| Registered electors | | 52,721 | | ▲16.68 |
| INC gain from Independent | | Swing | ▼12.54 | |

=== Assembly Election 1957 ===
1957 Mysore State Legislative Assembly election : Hassan
| Party | Candidate | Votes | % | ±% |
|---|---|---|---|---|
| Independent | K. T. Dasappa | 16,244 | 54.01% | New |
| INC | L. T. Karle | 13,070 | 43.46% | ▼25.96 |
| Independent | Dyavegowda | 762 | 2.53% | New |
| Margin of victory | | 3,174 | 10.55% | ▼32.85 |
| Turnout | | 30,076 | 66.56% | ▲21.61 |
| Total valid votes | | 30,076 | | |
| Registered electors | | 45,186 | | ▲9.49 |
| Independent gain from INC | | Swing | ▼15.41 | |

=== Assembly Election 1952 ===
1952 Mysore State Legislative Assembly election : Hassan
| Party | Candidate | Votes | % | ±% |
|---|---|---|---|---|
| INC | D. R. Kari Gowda | 12,878 | 69.42% | New |
| Socialist Party (India) | C. P. Jagadeesh | 4,827 | 26.02% | New |
| Independent | B. M. Manjappa Gowda | 845 | 4.56% | New |
| Margin of victory | | 8,051 | 43.40% | |
| Turnout | | 18,550 | 44.95% | |
| Total valid votes | | 18,550 | | |
| Registered electors | | 41,270 | | |
| INC win (new seat) | | | | |

== See also ==
- Hassan District
- List of constituencies of Karnataka Legislative Assembly
