= Preetham J. Gowda =

Indian politician

Preetham J. Gowda (born 1982) is an Indian politician from Karnataka. He was elected as the Member of Legislative Assembly from Hassan Assembly constituency representing the Bharatiya Janata Party in 2018.

Gowda is from Hassan. He is the son of Javaregowda. He completed his Bachelor of Engineering in computer science in 2003 at Malnad College of Engineering which is affiliated with the Visvesvaraya Technological University, Belagavi.

He first became an MLA winning the 2018 Karnataka Legislative Assembly election from Hassan Assembly constituency in Hassan district representing the Bharatiya Janata Party. He polled 63,348 votes and defeated his nearest rival, H. S. Prakash of the Janata Dal (S), by a margin of 13,006 votes. He lost the Hassan seat in the 2023 Karnataka Legislative Assembly election. He polled 77,322 votes and lost to Swaroop Prakash of the JDS by a margin of 7,854 votes.
