= Cement Manju =

Indian politician (born 1982)

S. Manjunatha (born 1 January 1982), also known as Cement Manju, is an Indian politician from Karnataka. He is a member of the Karnataka Legislative Assembly from Sakleshpur Assembly constituency which is reserved for SC community in Hassan district. He represents Bharatiya Janata Party and won the 2023 Karnataka Legislative Assembly election.

== Early life and education ==
Manju is from Sakleshpur. He is the son of Shivananjappa. He runs his own business. He completed his schooling in 1997 from M Manasa High School, Sakaleshpura.

== Career ==
Manju won from Sakleshpur Assembly constituency representing Bharatiya Janata Party , which was in an alliance with Janata Dal (S), in the 2023 Karnataka Legislative Assembly election. He polled 58,604 votes and defeated his nearest rival, H. K. Kumaraswamy of Janata Dal (Secular), by a margin of 2,056 votes.
