= A. Manju =

Indian politician

Minister of Animal Husbandry and Sericulture of Karnataka
- In office 2013 – 17 May 2018
- Preceded by: T. B. Jayachandra
- Succeeded by: Venkatrao Nadgouda
- Constituency: Arkalgud

Member of the Karnataka Legislative Assembly
- In office 1999–2004
- Preceded by: A. T. Ramaswamy
- Succeeded by: A. T. Ramaswamy
- Constituency: Arkalgud

Member of the Karnataka Legislative Assembly
- In office 2008–2018
- Preceded by: A. T. Ramaswamy
- Succeeded by: A. T. Ramaswamy

Personal details
- Born: 1 November 1957 (age 68) Hanyal
- Party: Janata Dal (Secular)
- Other political affiliations: Bhartiya Janata Party; Indian National Congress
- Children: Mantar Gowda; Laghna Gowda
- Occupation: Politician
- Profession: Lawyer

A. Manju is an Indian Politician from the state of Karnataka. He was a four-term member of the Karnataka Legislative Assembly representing the Arkalgud constituency.

== Political party ==
He was elected as MLA from Arkalgud as BJP's candidate in 1999. Later he joined Congress Party and won Arkalgud Vidhan Sabha seats in 2008 and 2013. After the 2013 elections, he was a minister under Chief Minister Siddaramaiah.

He contested the 2014 Lok Sabha elections as a Congress candidate from Hassan constituency but lost to Deve Gowda. Later he re-joined Bhartiya Janata Party, and was its losing candidate in the Hassan Lok Sabha constituency in 2019, this time losing to Deve Gowda's grandson Prajwal Revanna.

== Ministry ==
He was the Minister for Animal Husbandry, Fisheries Department in the K. Siddaramaiah led Karnataka Government.

== Gallery ==
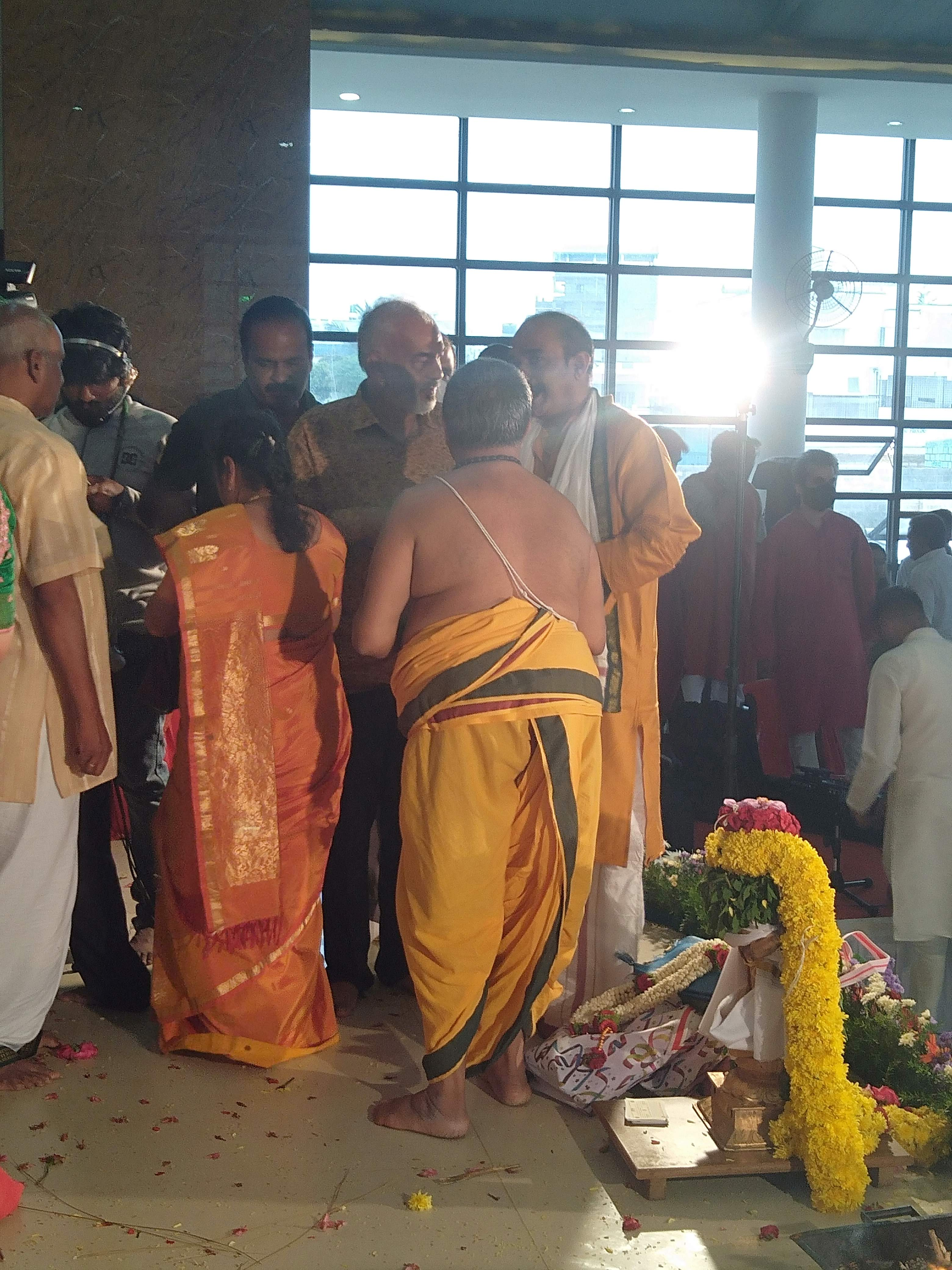
A. Manju attending a private function

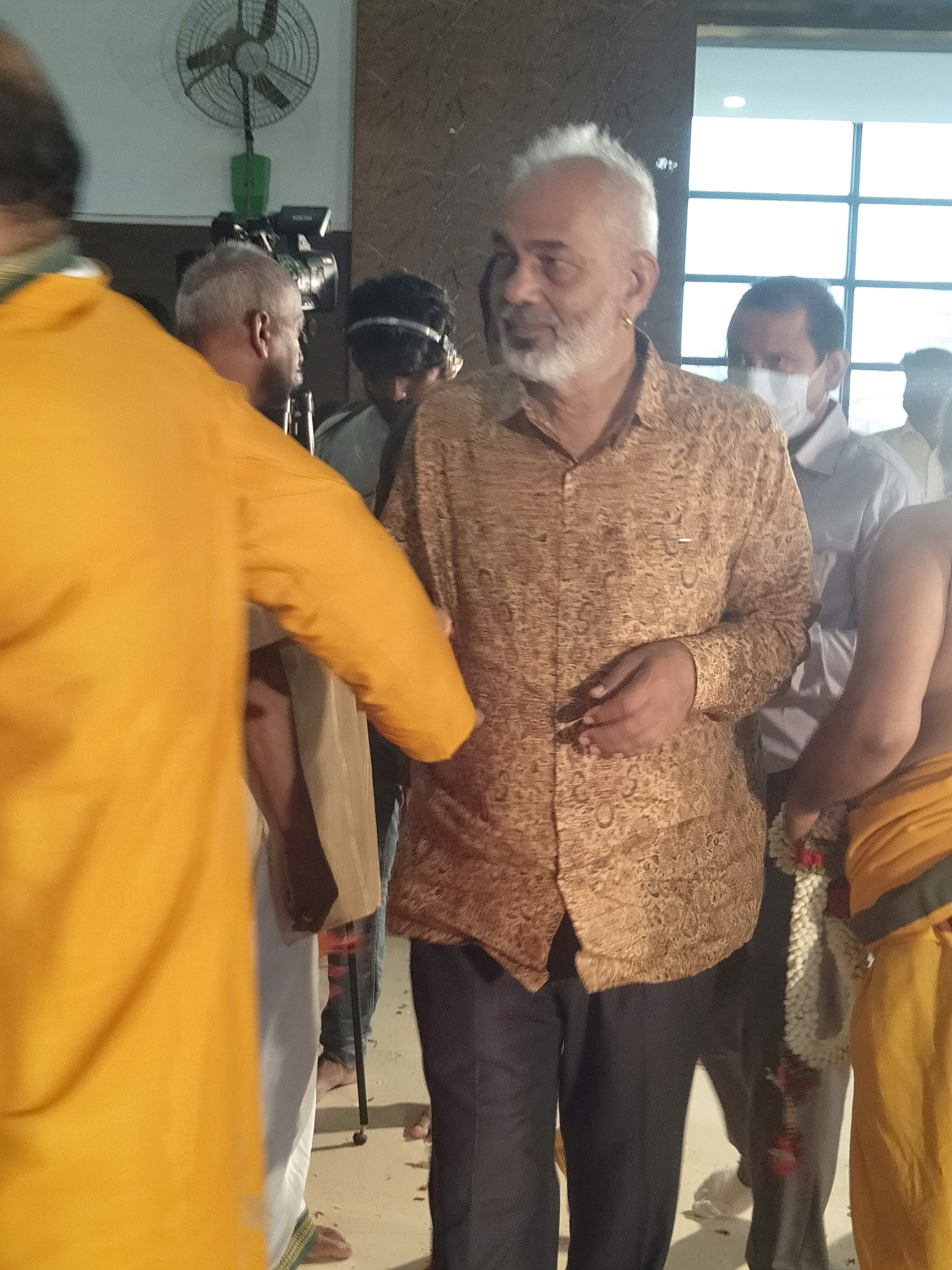
A. Manju attending a Kalyanotsava
