= H. N. Nanje Gowda =

Indian politician (1935–2008)

H. N. Nanje Gowda (born 12 February 1935 in Hanyalu Village, Hassan District - died 19 December 2008 in Bangalore, Karnataka) was an Indian politician from Karnataka.

He was a member of the Praja Socialist Party, then the Swatantra Party, then the Indian National Congress, then the Bharatiya Janata Party, then the Janata Dal (United) and finally the Janata Dal (Secular).

Nanje Gowda was a member of the Lok Sabha for two terms from Hassan constituency from 1980 to 1989 and was also Minister for Irrigation in the D. Devaraj Urs Ministry.

Nanje Gowda was a member of the Karnataka Legislative Assembly from the Arkalgud constituency which he won Swatantra Party ticket from 1967 to 1971 and Basavanagudi constituency in 1994 to 1999 on Bharatiya Janata Party ticket.

== Electoral History ==
=== Legislative Assembly ===
Year	Constituency	Party	Votes	%	Opponent	Party	Votes	%	Result	Margin	%

=== Lok Sabha ===
Year	Constituency	Party	Votes	%	Opponent	Party	Votes	%	Result	Margin	%
2004	Hassan	JD(U)	86,940	9.53	H. D. Devegowda	JD(S)	4,62,625	50.72	Lost	-3,75,685	-41.19
1989	Hassan	JP	2,14,131	28.75	H. C. Srikantaiah	INC	4,03,286	54.15	Lost	-1,89,155	-25.40
1984	Hassan	INC	2,65,488	49.52	K. B. Mallappa	JP	2,33,519	43.56	Won	31,969	5.96
1980	Hassan	INC(I)	2,19,969	49.20	B. B. Shivappa	JP	1,25,221	28.01	Won	94,748	21.19
