= Arsikere Assembly constituency =

Legislative Assembly constituency in Karnataka State, India

Coordinates: 13.32°N 76.25°E

Arsikere
- Constituency No. 194 for the Karnataka Legislative Assembly
- Map of Arsikere Vidhana Sabha constituency

Constituency details
- Country: India
- Region: South India
- State: Karnataka
- District: Hassan
- Lok Sabha constituency: Hassan
- Established: 1951
- Total electors: 216,204 (2023)
- Reservation: None

Member of Legislative Assembly
- 16th Karnataka Legislative Assembly
- Incumbent K. M. Shivalinge Gowda
- Party: Indian National Congress
- Elected year: 2023
- Preceded by: A. S. Basavaraj

Arsikere Assembly constituency is one of the 224 Legislative Assembly constituencies of Karnataka state in India.

It is part of Hassan district.

== Members of the Legislative Assembly ==
Election	Member	Party
1952	K. Panchaksharaiah	Indian National Congress
1957	A. R. Karisiddappa	Indian National Congress
1962	P. B. Bommanna	Praja Socialist Party
1967	G. Channabasappa	Indian National Congress
1972	H. S. Siddappa	Indian National Congress
1974 By-election (Note: Died on 12/06/1974)	Anivalada Nanjappa	Indian National Congress
1978	D. B. Gangadharappa	Indian National Congress
1983	G. S. Basavaraju	Indian National Congress
1985	D. B. Gangadharappa	Independent politician
1989	K. P. Prabhu Kumar	Indian National Congress
1994	G. S. Parameshwarappa	Janata Dal
1999	G. V. Siddappa	Indian National Congress
2004	A. S. Basavaraju	Bharatiya Janata Party
2008	K. M. Shivalinge Gowda	Janata Dal
2013	K. M. Shivalinge Gowda	Janata Dal
2018	K. M. Shivalinge Gowda	Janata Dal
2023	K. M. Shivalinge Gowda	Indian National Congress

== Election results ==
=== Assembly Election 2023 ===
2023 Karnataka Legislative Assembly election : Arsikere
Party	Candidate	Votes	%	±%
INC	K. M. Shivalinge Gowda	98,375	52.86	▼1.48
JD(S)	N. R. Santhosh	78,198	42.02	
BJP	G. V. T. Basavaraja	6,538	3.51	
NOTA	None of the above	617	0.33	▼0.29
Margin of victory		20,177	10.84	▼14.42
Turnout		186,156	86.10	▲3.09
Total valid votes		186,111		
Registered electors		216,204		▲3.75
INC gain from JD(S)		Swing	▼1.48	

=== Assembly Election 2018 ===
2018 Karnataka Legislative Assembly election : Arsikere
Party	Candidate	Votes	%	±%
JD(S)	K. M. Shivalinge Gowda	93,986	54.34	▼3.26
INC	G. B. Shashidhara	50,297	29.08	
BJP	G. Mariswamy	25,258	14.60	
RPI(A)	N. C. Chandrashekara	1,354	0.78	
NOTA	None of the above	1,079	0.62	
Margin of victory		43,689	25.26	▲2.97
Turnout		172,981	83.01	▲2.51
Total valid votes		172,959		
Registered electors		208,389		▲5.55
JD(S) hold		Swing	▼3.26	

=== Assembly Election 2013 ===
2013 Karnataka Legislative Assembly election : Arsikere
Party	Candidate	Votes	%	±%
JD(S)	K. M. Shivalinge Gowda	76,579	57.60	▲4.48
INC	B. Shivaramu	46,948	35.32	
KJP	Dr. Lokesh. D. G	26,312	19.79	
BJP	D. B. Gangadhar Dummenahalli	2,464	1.85	
Margin of victory		29,631	22.29	▼2.27
Turnout		158,944	80.50	▲2.41
Total valid votes		132,940		
Registered electors		197,438		▲10.59
JD(S) hold		Swing	▲4.48	

=== Assembly Election 2008 ===
2008 Karnataka Legislative Assembly election : Arsikere
Party	Candidate	Votes	%	±%
JD(S)	K. M. Shivalinge Gowda	74,025	53.12	
INC	G. V. Siddappa	39,799	28.56	
BJP	B. N. Ravi	19,824	14.23	
BSP	K. M. Basavaraj	2,301	1.65	
Independent	Praveen. M. P	1,949	1.40	
JD(U)	B. N. Ramesh	1,445	1.04	
Margin of victory		34,226	24.56	▲18.45
Turnout		139,422	78.09	▲10.98
Total valid votes		139,343		
Registered electors		178,536		▲13.34
JD(S) gain from BJP		Swing	▲18.21	

=== Assembly Election 2004 ===
2004 Karnataka Legislative Assembly election : Arsikere
Party	Candidate	Votes	%	±%
BJP	A. S. Basavaraju	36,867	34.91	
INC	Siddappa Gv	30,418	28.81	
JD(S)	Prabhukumar Kp	20,381	19.30	
Independent	Bilichowdaiah	9,996	9.47	
JP	Vidyadara Bn	5,497	5.21	
Urs Samyuktha Paksha	Uralingappa. G	1,397	1.32	
Kannada Nadu Party	Thontadarya Br	1,036	0.98	
Margin of victory		6,449	6.11	▼4.81
Turnout		105,711	67.11	▼4.06
Total valid votes		105,592		
Registered electors		157,517		▲7.26
BJP gain from INC		Swing	▼8.04	

=== Assembly Election 1999 ===
1999 Karnataka Legislative Assembly election : Arsikere
Party	Candidate	Votes	%	±%
INC	G. V. Siddappa	43,224	42.95	
BJP	Basavaraju As	32,235	32.03	
JD(S)	K. P. Prabhu Kumar	22,208	22.07	
Independent	Sn Ramachandra Shastry	1,238	1.23	
Independent	At Thimmappa	1,194	1.19	
Margin of victory		10,989	10.92	▲8.13
Turnout		104,522	71.17	▼0.10
Total valid votes		100,639		
Registered electors		146,857		▲4.92
INC gain from JD		Swing	▲10.43	

=== Assembly Election 1994 ===
1994 Karnataka Legislative Assembly election : Arsikere
Party	Candidate	Votes	%	±%
JD	G. S. Parameshwarappa	31,845	32.52	
INC	Haranahalli Ramaswamy	29,113	29.73	
BJP	A. S. Basavaraju	20,326	20.76	▲4.78
INC	S. C. Siddaramappa	12,636	12.90	
Karnataka Rajya Ryota Sangha	K. R. Chandra Shekar	2,668	2.72	
Kannada Chalavali Vatal Paksha	Shivarudrappa	635	0.65	
Margin of victory		2,732	2.79	▼10.05
Turnout		99,753	71.27	▲1.95
Total valid votes		97,921		
Registered electors		139,970		▲6.55
JD gain from INC		Swing	▼3.30	

=== Assembly Election 1989 ===
1989 Karnataka Legislative Assembly election : Arsikere
Party	Candidate	Votes	%	±%
INC	K. P. Prabhu Kumar	30,533	35.82	
JD	G. S. Parameswarappa	19,591	22.98	
JP	D. B. Gangadharappa	15,776	18.51	▼30.16
BJP	A. S. Basavaraju	13,622	15.98	▲10.61
Independent	G. Uralingappa	2,278	2.67	
Kranti Sabha	B. P. Dayanand	891	1.05	
Margin of victory		10,942	12.84	▲5.67
Turnout		91,058	69.32	▲0.11
Total valid votes		85,248		
Registered electors		131,362		▲23.11
INC gain from Independent		Swing	▼12.85	

=== Assembly Election 1985 ===
1985 Karnataka Legislative Assembly election : Arsikere
Party	Candidate	Votes	%	±%
Independent	D. B. Gangadharappa	35,356	48.67	
Independent	G. S. Basavaraju	30,148	41.50	
BJP	A. S. Basavaraju	3,902	5.37	
Independent	Venkataramanappa	604	0.83	
Independent	G. Kenchappa	547	0.75	
Margin of victory		5,208	7.17	▼14.39
Turnout		73,845	69.21	▲0.96
Total valid votes		72,640		
Registered electors		106,704		▲11.96
Independent gain from INC		Swing	▼2.76	

=== Assembly Election 1983 ===
1983 Karnataka Legislative Assembly election : Arsikere
Party	Candidate	Votes	%	±%
INC	G. S. Basavaraju	32,877	51.43	▲39.57
Independent	D. B. Gangadharappa	19,095	29.87	
BJP	K. N. Durgappa Setty	11,950	18.69	▼12.01
Margin of victory		13,782	21.56	▼4.27
Turnout		65,048	68.25	▼6.72
Total valid votes		63,922		
Registered electors		95,307		▲9.57
INC gain from INC(I)		Swing	▼5.11	

=== Assembly Election 1978 ===
1978 Karnataka Legislative Assembly election : Arsikere
Party	Candidate	Votes	%	±%
INC(I)	D. B. Gangadharappa	36,062	56.54	
JP	K. N. Durgappa Setty	19,585	30.70	
INC	G. S. Basavaraju	7,563	11.86	
Independent	Krishna Naik	575	0.90	
Margin of victory		16,477	25.83	▲23.55
Turnout		65,210	74.97	▲6.94
Total valid votes		63,785		
Rejected ballots		1,425	2.19	▲2.19
Registered electors		86,981		▲18.96
INC(I) gain from INC(O)		Swing	▲8.77	

=== Assembly Election 1972 ===
1972 Mysore State Legislative Assembly election : Arsikere
Party	Candidate	Votes	%	±%
INC(O)	H. S. Siddappa	23,026	47.77	▲8.76
INC	Gangadharappa	21,925	45.49	
ABJS	N. M. Basavaraj	1,668	3.46	
Independent	Papiah	837	1.74	
Independent	Basappa Odeyar	745	1.55	
Margin of victory		1,101	2.28	▼14.61
Turnout		49,747	68.03	▼1.19
Total valid votes		48,201		
Registered electors		73,120		▲17.82
INC(O) gain from INC		Swing	▼8.13	

=== Assembly Election 1967 ===
1967 Mysore State Legislative Assembly election : Arsikere
Party	Candidate	Votes	%	±%
INC	G. Channabasappa	22,847	55.90	
SWA	H. S. Siddappa	15,942	39.01	
ABJS	K. N. D. Setty	2,082	5.09	
Margin of victory		6,905	16.89	▲6.25
Turnout		42,958	69.22	▲11.86
Total valid votes		40,871		
Registered electors		62,060		▲18.05
INC gain from PSP		Swing	▲3.70	

=== Assembly Election 1962 ===
1962 Mysore State Legislative Assembly election : Arsikere
Party	Candidate	Votes	%	±%
PSP	P. B. Bommanna	14,639	52.20	
INC	A. R. Karisiddappa	11,655	41.56	▼14.11
Independent	T. Mohamed Ismail	928	3.31	
ABJS	K. M. Basavaraj	824	2.94	▼2.10
Margin of victory		2,984	10.64	▼5.74
Turnout		30,155	57.36	▼1.72
Total valid votes		28,046		
Registered electors		52,573		▲16.57
PSP gain from INC		Swing	▼3.47	

=== Assembly Election 1957 ===
1957 Mysore State Legislative Assembly election : Arsikere
Party	Candidate	Votes	%	±%
INC	A. R. Karisiddappa	14,834	55.67	
Independent	Y. Dharmappa	10,469	39.29	
PSP	K. M. Basavaraj	1,343	5.04	▼4.02
Margin of victory		4,365	16.38	▲14.86
Turnout		26,646	59.08	▲13.41
Total valid votes		26,646		
Registered electors		45,101		▲10.31
INC hold		Swing	▲9.44	

=== Assembly Election 1952 ===
1952 Mysore State Legislative Assembly election : Arsikere
Party	Candidate	Votes	%	±%
INC	K. Panchaksharaiah	8,631	46.23	
KMPP	P. B. Bommanna	8,348	44.71	
Independent	K. M. Basavaraj	1,692	9.06	
Margin of victory		283	1.52	
Turnout		18,671	45.67	
Total valid votes		18,671		
Registered electors		40,884		
INC gain from				

== See also ==
- List of constituencies of the Karnataka Legislative Assembly
- Hassan district
