= Arkalgud Assembly constituency =

Constituency of the Karnataka legislative assembly in India

Coordinates: 12.76°N 76.06°E

Arkalgud
- Constituency No. 198 for the Karnataka Legislative Assembly

Constituency details
- Country: India
- Region: South India
- State: Karnataka
- District: Hassan
- Lok Sabha constituency: Hassan
- Established: 1951
- Total electors: 227,985 (2023)
- Reservation: None

Member of Legislative Assembly
- 16th Karnataka Legislative Assembly
- Incumbent A. Manju
- Party: JD(S)
- Alliance: NDA
- Elected year: 2023
- Preceded by: A. T. Ramaswamy

Arkalgud Assembly constituency is one of the 224 constituencies in the Karnataka Legislative Assembly of Karnataka, a southern state of India. Arkalgud is also part of Hassan Lok Sabha constituency.

== Members of the Legislative Assembly ==
Election	Member	Party
1952	G. A. Thimmappa Gowda	Indian National Congress
1957	Puttegowda Alias Puttaswamyy Gowda	Independent politician
1962	G. A. Thimmappa Gowda	Indian National Congress
1967	H. N. Nanje Gowda	Swatantra Party
1972	H. N. Nanje Gowda	Indian National Congress
1978	K. B. Mallappa	Janata Party
1983	K. B. Mallappa	Janata Party
1985	K. B. Mallappa	Janata Party
1989	A. T. Ramaswamy	Indian National Congress
1994	A. T. Ramaswamy	Indian National Congress
1999	A. Manju	Bharatiya Janata Party
2004	A. T. Ramaswamy	Janata Dal
2008	A. Manju	Indian National Congress
2013	A. Manju	Indian National Congress
2018	A. T. Ramaswamy	Janata Dal
2023	A. Manju	Janata Dal

== Election results ==
=== Assembly Election 2023 ===
2023 Karnataka Legislative Assembly election : Arkalgud
Party	Candidate	Votes	%	±%
JD(S)	A. Manju	74,844	38.57%	▼0.82
Independent	M. T. Krishnegowda	54,946	28.31%	New
INC	H. P. Sridhargowda	35,974	18.54%	New
BJP	H. Yogaramesha	19,549	10.07%	▼1.94
BSP	Harish Athni	2,400	1.24%	New
AAP	B. T. Javaregowda	2,024	1.04%	New
NOTA	None of the above	624	0.32%	▼0.31
Margin of victory		19,898	10.25%	▲4.61
Turnout		194,632	85.37%	▼2.33
Total valid votes		194,067		
Registered electors		227,985		▲5.74
JD(S) hold		Swing	▼6.46	

=== Assembly Election 2018 ===
2018 Karnataka Legislative Assembly election : Arkalgud
Party	Candidate	Votes	%	±%
JD(S)	A. T. Ramaswamy	85,064	45.03%	▲7.61
INC	A. Manju	74,411	39.39%	▼4.29
BJP	H. Yogaramesha	22,679	12.01%	▼11.11
Indian New Congress Party	Sheshegowda	3,559	1.88%	New
NOTA	None of the above	1,189	0.63%	New
Margin of victory		10,653	5.64%	▼0.62
Turnout		189,074	87.70%	▲1.68
Total valid votes		188,904		
Registered electors		215,604		▲8.92
JD(S) gain from INC		Swing	▲1.35	

=== Assembly Election 2013 ===
2013 Karnataka Legislative Assembly election : Arkalgud
Party	Candidate	Votes	%	±%
INC	A. Manju	61,369	43.68%	▼3.28
JD(S)	A. T. Ramaswamy	52,575	37.42%	▼3.32
Independent	H. Yogaramesha	32,477	23.12%	New
KJP	S. Puttaswamy	12,259	8.73%	New
Independent	K. K Yogeshappa	2,789	1.99%	New
BSP	B. C. Rajesh	2,774	1.97%	New
BJP	M. K. Nataraj	1,775	1.26%	New
Independent	H. S Yogesha	1,021	0.73%	New
Margin of victory		8,794	6.26%	▲0.04
Turnout		170,283	86.02%	▲4.41
Total valid votes		140,486		
Registered electors		197,950		▲11.08
INC hold		Swing	▼3.28	

=== Assembly Election 2008 ===
2008 Karnataka Legislative Assembly election : Arkalgud
Party	Candidate	Votes	%	±%
INC	A. Manju	68,257	46.96%	▲6.66
JD(S)	A. T. Ramaswamy	59,217	40.74%	▼2.24
BJP	K. Nanjunde Gowda	9,206	6.33%	New
BSP	K. S. Ramegowda	3,521	2.42%	New
SKP	H. T. Huchappa	2,598	1.79%	New
Independent	H. D. Krishna	2,554	1.76%	New
Margin of victory		9,040	6.22%	▲3.54
Turnout		145,439	81.61%	▲6.29
Total valid votes		145,353		
Registered electors		178,209		▲22.27
INC gain from JD(S)		Swing	▲3.98	

=== Assembly Election 2004 ===
2004 Karnataka Legislative Assembly election : Arkalgud
Party	Candidate	Votes	%	±%
JD(S)	A. T. Ramaswamy	47,131	42.98%	▲5.27
INC	A. Manju	44,192	40.30%	▼12.77
BSP	Rajesha Bc	6,220	5.67%	New
Independent	Mohana Km	3,169	2.89%	New
BJP	Vageesh Prasad Bs	2,325	2.12%	New
JD(U)	Purushotham Hn	2,242	2.04%	New
JP	Lokesh Kumar Es	1,961	1.79%	New
Independent	Ramesh Vatal	1,025	0.93%	New
Kannada Nadu Party	Ningachar H E (swamy)	774	0.71%	New
Margin of victory		2,939	2.68%	▼12.67
Turnout		109,773	75.32%	▼4.33
Total valid votes		109,668		
Registered electors		145,751		▲9.88
JD(S) gain from BJP		Swing	▼10.09	

=== Assembly Election 1999 ===
1999 Karnataka Legislative Assembly election : Arkalgud
Party	Candidate	Votes	%	±%
BJP	A. Manju	53,732	53.07%	▲20.06
INC	A. T. Ramaswamy	38,187	37.71%	▼1.50
JD(S)	K. B. Mallappa	8,979	8.87%	▼16.92
Margin of victory		15,545	15.35%	▲9.15
Turnout		105,649	79.65%	▲1.68
Total valid votes		101,253		
Registered electors		132,644		▲4.57
BJP gain from INC		Swing	▲13.86	

=== Assembly Election 1994 ===
1994 Karnataka Legislative Assembly election : Arkalgud
Party	Candidate	Votes	%	±%
INC	A. T. Ramaswamy	38,222	39.21%	▲2.92
BJP	A. Manju	32,181	33.01%	▲9.02
JD	K. B. Mallappa	25,145	25.79%	New
INC	H. G. Shetty Gowda	1,549	1.59%	New
Margin of victory		6,041	6.20%	▼5.24
Turnout		98,895	77.97%	▲1.79
Total valid votes		97,490		
Registered electors		126,843		▲7.58
INC hold		Swing	▲2.92	

=== Assembly Election 1989 ===
1989 Karnataka Legislative Assembly election : Arkalgud
Party	Candidate	Votes	%	±%
INC	A. T. Ramaswamy	30,507	36.29%	New
JD	K. B. Maliappa	20,889	24.85%	New
Independent	A. Manju	20,167	23.99%	New
JP	Byre Gowada	10,846	12.90%	New
Margin of victory		9,618	11.44%	▼9.39
Turnout		89,824	76.18%	▲0.77
Total valid votes		84,062		
Registered electors		117,905		▲29.96
INC gain from JP		Swing	▼21.24	

=== Assembly Election 1985 ===
1985 Karnataka Legislative Assembly election : Arkalgud
Party	Candidate	Votes	%	±%
JP	K. B. Mallappa	38,779	57.53%	▼2.32
INC	G. T. Krishna Murthy	24,738	36.70%	New
BJP	A. J. Subbegowda	1,344	1.99%	New
Independent	A. T. Ramaiah	736	1.09%	New
Independent	Rangegowda	551	0.82%	New
Independent	Dyavegowda	533	0.79%	New
Margin of victory		14,041	20.83%	▲0.19
Turnout		68,420	75.41%	▲7.07
Total valid votes		67,405		
Registered electors		90,727		▲7.25
JP hold		Swing	▼2.32	

=== Assembly Election 1983 ===
1983 Karnataka Legislative Assembly election : Arkalgud
Party	Candidate	Votes	%	±%
JP	K. B. Mallappa	33,927	59.85%	▲4.83
INC	B. N. Puttegowda	22,225	39.21%	New
Independent	Setty Gowda	537	0.95%	New
Margin of victory		11,702	20.64%	▼10.84
Turnout		57,809	68.34%	▼10.15
Total valid votes		56,689		
Registered electors		84,592		▲10.84
JP hold		Swing	▲4.83	

=== Assembly Election 1978 ===
1978 Karnataka Legislative Assembly election : Arkalgud
Party	Candidate	Votes	%	±%
JP	K. B. Mallappa	32,315	55.02%	▲35.71
INC(I)	Puttalingegowda	13,824	23.54%	New
INC	Nanjegowda. H. N	11,717	19.95%	New
Independent	Sannadevaiah. H. P	674	1.15%	New
Margin of victory		18,491	31.48%	▼6.41
Turnout		59,899	78.49%	▲13.05
Total valid votes		58,736		
Rejected ballots		1,163	1.94%	▲1.94
Registered electors		76,319		▲14.14
JP gain from INC		Swing	▼2.17	

=== Assembly Election 1972 ===
1972 Mysore State Legislative Assembly election : Arkalgud
Party	Candidate	Votes	%	±%
INC	H. N. Nanje Gowda	24,441	57.19%	▼7.31
INC(O)	K. B. Mallappa	8,251	19.31%	New
SWA	Ramaiah	4,547	10.64%	New
Independent	V. N. Saligram	2,637	6.17%	New
Independent	A. G. Annaiah	1,732	4.05%	New
ABJS	T. B. Kaluanabasappa	1,126	2.63%	New
Margin of victory		16,190	37.89%	▲8.88
Turnout		43,755	65.44%	▼3.47
Total valid votes		42,734		
Registered electors		66,864		▲24.33
INC gain from SWA		Swing	▼7.31	

=== Assembly Election 1967 ===
1967 Mysore State Legislative Assembly election : Arkalgud
Party	Candidate	Votes	%	±%
SWA	H. N. Nanje Gowda	22,876	64.50%	New
INC	G. A. Thimmappa Gowda	12,589	35.50%	▼22.00
Margin of victory		10,287	29.01%	▲7.49
Turnout		37,058	68.91%	▲0.83
Total valid votes		35,465		
Registered electors		53,780		▲3.74
SWA gain from INC		Swing	▲7.00	

=== Assembly Election 1962 ===
1962 Mysore State Legislative Assembly election : Arkalgud
Party	Candidate	Votes	%	±%
INC	G. A. Thimmappa Gowda	18,967	57.50%	New
PSP	H. N. Nanje Gowda	11,870	35.99%	New
Independent	D. H. Jawaraiah	1,069	3.24%	New
ABJS	K. Nagaraja Rao	739	2.24%	New
Independent	S. Kadegowda	340	1.03%	New
Margin of victory		7,097	21.52%	▲10.47
Turnout		35,296	68.08%	▲11.90
Total valid votes		32,985		
Registered electors		51,843		▲16.93
INC gain from Independent		Swing	▲1.98	

=== Assembly Election 1957 ===
1957 Mysore State Legislative Assembly election : Arkalgud
Party	Candidate	Votes	%	±%
Independent	Puttegowda Alias Puttaswamyy Gowda	13,831	55.52%	New
INC	G. A. Thimmappagowda	11,079	44.48%	New
Margin of victory		2,752	11.05%	▼12.15
Turnout		24,910	56.18%	▼0.35
Total valid votes		24,910		
Registered electors		44,336		▲17.97
Independent gain from INC		Swing	▼6.08	

=== Assembly Election 1952 ===
1952 Mysore State Legislative Assembly election : Arkalgud
Party	Candidate	Votes	%	±%
INC	G. A. Thimmappa Gowda	13,087	61.60%	New
KMPP	K. Keshava Murthy	8,158	38.40%	New
Margin of victory		4,929	23.20%	
Turnout		21,245	56.53%	
Total valid votes		21,245		
Registered electors		37,583		
INC gain from				

== See also ==
- Arkalgud
- Hassan district
- List of constituencies of Karnataka Legislative Assembly
