= A. T. Ramaswamy =

Former Indian politician

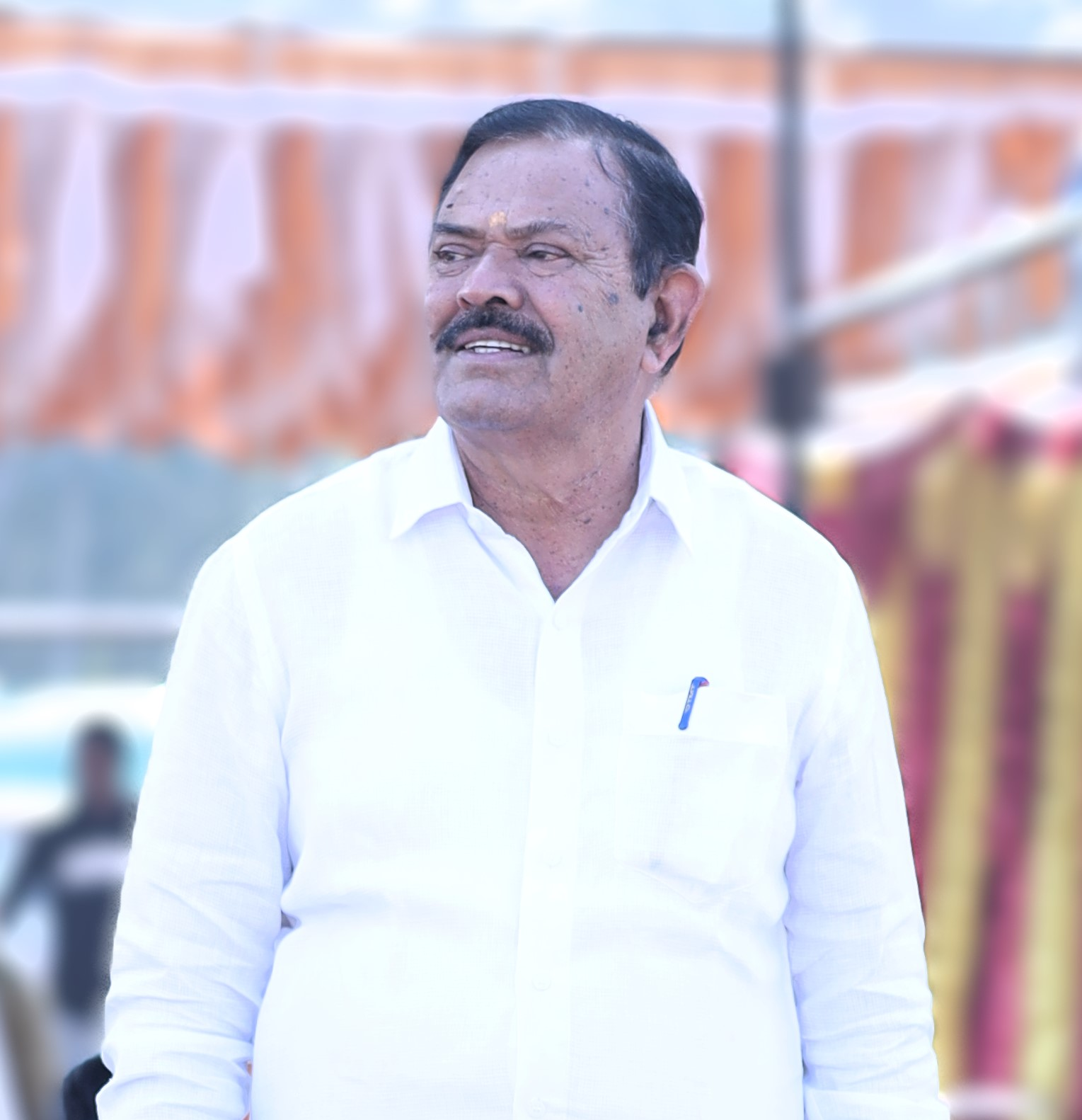

Bisilahalli, Aakalgud | Agriculturist
- In office 16 May 2018 – 10 May 2023
- Preceded by: A. Manju
- Succeeded by: A. Manju
- Constituency: Arkalgud

Personal details
- Born: 26 November 1951 (age 74) K Abbur
- Spouse: Asha Ramaswamy
- Parent: A.T. Timmegowda
- Education: B.Sc.Agriculture
- Alma mater: Darwad Agriculture College
- Known for: Agriculturist and Social Activist

A. T. Ramaswamy is a former Member of the Legislative Assembly in Karnataka. He has been elected to the Karnataka Legislative Assembly four times from the Arkalgud Vidhana Sabha constituency (1989, 1994, 2004, 2018).

The environmental organisation "Parisarakkagi Naavu", led by former MLA and environmentalist A.T. Ramaswamy, will officially be launched on 12 April. The initiative aims to unite environmental experts, students, citizens, and organisations across the state to work together for environmental conservation.
