= Shreyas M. Patel =

Indian politician

Member of Parliament, Lok Sabha
- Incumbent
- Assumed office 4 June 2024
- Preceded by: Prajwal Revanna
- Constituency: Hassan

Personal details
- Born: Karnataka, India
- Party: Indian National Congress
- Spouse: Akshatha B L (13 March 2023)
- Parent(s): P Mahesh, S G Anupama
- Profession: Politician

Shreyas M. Patel is an Indian politician and the elected candidate for Lok Sabha from Hassan Lok Sabha constituency in the 2024 general elections. He is a member of the Indian National Congress and secured 672,988 (49.67%) votes defeating Prajwal Revanna of Janata Dal (Secular) with a margin of 42,649 votes.

== See also ==
- 18th Lok Sabha
- Indian National Congress
