= H. Siddananjappa =

H. Siddananjappa (born 1908) was a veteran Indian politician and a member of the Indian National Congress. He served as a Member of Parliament (MP) representing the Mysore State (now Karnataka) for three consecutive terms, starting with the 1st Lok Sabha in 1952. He is widely cited in Indian political history as a model of integrity and simplicity, most notably for never owning a personal vehicle throughout his fifteen-year tenure in Parliament. He is described as a lawyer by profession, a Congress politician from Hassan, and a three-time Lok Sabha MP who won in 1952, 1957, and 1962.

== Political career ==
=== Member of Parliament (1st Lok Sabha) ===
In the inaugural 1951–52 Indian general election, Siddananjappa was elected to the 1st Lok Sabha from the Hassan Chickmagalur constituency in the then-Mysore State. During this landmark term (1952–1957), he was a member of the Indian National Congress under the leadership of Jawaharlal Nehru.

=== Successive terms ===
Following the reorganization of states and constituencies, he continued to represent the region in the lower house of Parliament:

- 2nd Lok Sabha (1957–1962): Elected from the Hassan constituency.
- 3rd Lok Sabha (1962–1967): Re-elected from the Hassan constituency.

=== Committee service ===
Siddananjappa was an active participant in parliamentary oversight. Most notably, he served as the Chairperson of the Committee on Government Assurances from 1964 to 1966. This committee is responsible for ensuring that promises made by Ministers on the floor of the House are fulfilled.

== Personal life and legacy ==
Siddananjappa was known for his simplicity and integrity. Even after serving three consecutive terms in the Lok Sabha, he maintained a humble lifestyle. Reports from The New Indian Express highlight that he lived by high ethical standards and never owned a car, often using public transport or walking to meet his constituents.
