= N. Shivappa =

Indian politician

Nuggehalli Shivappa was an Indian politician. He was a Member of Parliament of 4th and 5th Lok Sabha of India. He served the Hassan Lok Sabha Constituency.

== Personal Details ==
He hailed from a small town in Hassan district of Karnataka called Nuggehalli. He was a well known lawyer.

== Political career ==
He contested for the first time in 1967 in the 4th Lok Sabha Elections from the Swatantra Party and won by defeating S Shivappa. He became the youngest MP then at the age of 34. He supported Indira Gandhi during the hung parliament which helped her in becoming the Prime Minister of India. He was preceded by H. Siddananjappa of the Indian National Congress.

In 1971, in the 5th Lok Sabha Elections, he contested from the Indian National Congress
