= Sakleshpur Assembly constituency =

Legislative Assembly constituency in Karnataka State, India

Coordinates: 12.94°N 75.78°E

Sakleshpur
- Constituency No. 199 for the Karnataka Legislative Assembly

Constituency details
- Country: India
- Region: South India
- State: Karnataka
- District: Hassan
- Lok Sabha constituency: Hassan
- Established: 1961
- Total electors: 205,876 (2023)
- Reservation: SC

Member of Legislative Assembly
- 16th Karnataka Legislative Assembly
- Incumbent Cement Manju
- Party: Bharatiya Janata Party
- Elected year: 2023
- Preceded by: H. K. Kumaraswamy

Sakleshpur Assembly constituency is one of the 224 Legislative Assembly constituencies of Karnataka in India.

It is part of Hassan district and is reserved for candidates belonging to the Scheduled Castes. Cement Manju is the current MLA as he won the 2023 Karnataka Legislative Assembly election.

== Members of the Legislative Assembly ==
Election	Member	Party
1962	S. A. Vasanna Setty	Indian National Congress
1967	K. P. Chikkegowda	Swatantra Party
1972	K. M. Rudrappa	Indian National Congress
1978	J. D. Somappa	Indian National Congress
1983	J. D. Somappa	Indian National Congress
1985	B. D. Basavaraju	Janata Party
1989	Gurudev	Indian National Congress
1994	B. B. Shivappa	Bharatiya Janata Party
1999	B. B. Shivappa	Bharatiya Janata Party
2004	H. M. Viswanath	Janata Dal
2008	H. K. Kumaraswamy	Janata Dal
2013	H. K. Kumaraswamy	Janata Dal
2018	H. K. Kumaraswamy	Janata Dal
2023	Cement Manju	Bharatiya Janata Party

== Election results ==
=== Assembly Election 2023 ===
2023 Karnataka Legislative Assembly election : Sakleshpur
Party	Candidate	Votes	%	±%
BJP	Cement Manju	58,604	35.54	▼0.06
JD(S)	H. K. Kumaraswamy	56,548	34.29	▼4.38
INC	Murali Mohan	42,811	25.96	▲2.98
BSP	D. Shivamma	1,536	0.93	New
NOTA	None of the above	1,231	0.75	▼0.24
AAP	K. S. Pavan Kumar	1,002	0.61	New
UPP	Prathap. K. A	1,000	0.61	New
Margin of victory		2,056	1.25	▼1.82
Turnout		164,941	80.12	▼2.24
Total valid votes		164,898		
Registered electors		205,876		▲5.19
BJP gain from JD(S)		Swing	▼3.13	

=== Assembly Election 2018 ===
2018 Karnataka Legislative Assembly election : Sakleshpur
Party	Candidate	Votes	%	±%
JD(S)	H. K. Kumaraswamy	62,262	38.67	▼4.82
BJP	Somashekar Jayaraj	57,320	35.60	▲30.58
INC	Siddaiah	37,002	22.98	▲2.10
NOTA	None of the above	1,597	0.99	New
AIMEP	K. R. Pradeep Kumar	1,148	0.71	New
Margin of victory		4,942	3.07	▼19.54
Turnout		161,199	82.36	▲4.94
Total valid votes		161,008		
Registered electors		195,717		▲7.77
JD(S) hold		Swing	▼4.82	

=== Assembly Election 2013 ===
2013 Karnataka Legislative Assembly election : Sakleshpur
Party	Candidate	Votes	%	±%
JD(S)	H. K. Kumaraswamy	63,602	43.49	▲4.05
INC	D. Mallesh	30,533	20.88	
KJP	Umesh Belagodu	28,117	19.23	New
BJP	Dr. H. R. Narayanaswamy	7,336	5.02	▼23.88
BSP	Kumargourav Hethur	4,424	3.03	▼3.43
Independent	Sanjay Babu. V	2,069	1.41	New
HND	Puttaiah	1,309	0.90	New
Independent	Valalahalli Veeresha	1,032	0.71	New
Margin of victory		33,069	22.61	▲12.07
Turnout		140,591	77.42	▲2.21
Total valid votes		146,229		
Registered electors		181,602		▲8.20
JD(S) hold		Swing	▲4.05	

=== Assembly Election 2008 ===
2008 Karnataka Legislative Assembly election : Sakleshpur
Party	Candidate	Votes	%	±%
JD(S)	H. K. Kumaraswamy	49,768	39.44	▲1.11
BJP	Nirvanaiah	36,473	28.90	▲23.75
INC	D. C. Sannaswamy	26,352	20.88	▲2.58
BSP	Sridhara Kaliveera	8,154	6.46	▼9.32
Independent	Gangadhara Prasad	3,058	2.42	New
LJP	Virupaksha. T. R	1,299	1.03	New
RPI(A)	K. Shanmukha Kallaiah	1,083	0.86	New
Margin of victory		13,295	10.54	▼9.49
Turnout		126,230	75.21	▲3.21
Total valid votes		126,187		
Registered electors		167,833		▲10.93
JD(S) hold		Swing	▲1.11	

=== Assembly Election 2004 ===
2004 Karnataka Legislative Assembly election : Sakleshpur
Party	Candidate	Votes	%	±%
JD(S)	H. M. Viswanath	41,704	38.33	▲9.48
INC	B. B. Shivappa	19,911	18.30	▼11.21
Independent	B. D. Basavaraju	19,375	17.81	New
BSP	Sridhara Kaliveera	17,174	15.78	▲10.08
BJP	Chandrashekar. E. S	5,605	5.15	▼25.67
JP	Ganesh. H. S	3,140	2.89	New
Kannada Nadu Party	Patel N. B. Anand	1,144	1.05	New
Independent	Komalanatha @ Bhagya. U. M	751	0.69	New
Margin of victory		21,793	20.03	▲18.72
Turnout		108,937	72.00	▼1.53
Total valid votes		108,804		
Registered electors		151,293		▲3.11
JD(S) gain from BJP		Swing	▲7.51	

=== Assembly Election 1999 ===
1999 Karnataka Legislative Assembly election : Sakleshpur
Party	Candidate	Votes	%	±%
BJP	B. B. Shivappa	31,702	30.82	▼9.46
INC	B. R. Gurudev	30,358	29.51	▲0.01
JD(S)	H. M. Viswanath	29,682	28.85	New
BSP	B. C. Shankarachar	5,863	5.70	▲4.62
Independent	J. D. Somappa	4,621	4.49	New
Independent	Thammayanna	646	0.63	New
Margin of victory		1,344	1.31	▼9.47
Turnout		107,890	73.53	▲0.59
Total valid votes		102,872		
Rejected ballots		4,969	4.61	▲3.05
Registered electors		146,735		▲4.12
BJP hold		Swing	▼9.46	

=== Assembly Election 1994 ===
1994 Karnataka Legislative Assembly election : Sakleshpur
Party	Candidate	Votes	%	±%
BJP	B. B. Shivappa	40,761	40.28	New
INC	J. D. Somappa	29,852	29.50	▼11.30
JD	B. D. Basavaraju	25,630	25.33	▲1.97
INC	H. B. Balaraj	2,178	2.15	New
BSP	S. Lakshmana	1,090	1.08	New
Independent	T. D. Khande Rao	690	0.68	New
Margin of victory		10,909	10.78	▲4.65
Turnout		102,798	72.94	▼3.21
Total valid votes		101,197		
Rejected ballots		1,601	1.56	▼3.12
Registered electors		140,930		▲4.24
BJP gain from INC		Swing	▼0.52	

=== Assembly Election 1989 ===
1989 Karnataka Legislative Assembly election : Sakleshpur
Party	Candidate	Votes	%	±%
INC	Gurudev	40,039	40.80	▲6.11
JP	H. B. Yajaman	34,025	34.67	New
JD	B. D. Basavaraju	22,927	23.36	New
Margin of victory		6,014	6.13	▼18.95
Turnout		102,957	76.15	▲2.05
Total valid votes		98,136		
Rejected ballots		4,821	4.68	▲3.13
Registered electors		135,195		▲26.75
INC gain from JP		Swing	▼18.97	

=== Assembly Election 1985 ===
1985 Karnataka Legislative Assembly election : Sakleshpur
Party	Candidate	Votes	%	±%
JP	B. D. Basavaraju	46,511	59.77	▲53.99
INC	H. B. Yajaman	26,997	34.69	▼7.20
BJP	M. P. Nanjunath	2,230	2.87	▼31.67
Independent	Byraiah	1,096	1.41	New
Margin of victory		19,514	25.08	▲17.73
Turnout		79,039	74.10	▲12.45
Total valid votes		77,815		
Rejected ballots		1,224	1.55	▼0.74
Registered electors		106,662		▲4.41
JP gain from INC		Swing	▲17.88	

=== Assembly Election 1983 ===
1983 Karnataka Legislative Assembly election : Sakleshpur
Party	Candidate	Votes	%	±%
INC	J. D. Somappa	25,778	41.89	▲24.23
BJP	M. P. Nanjunath	21,253	34.54	New
Independent	B. M. Bhuvanaksha	5,902	9.59	New
JP	N. B. Kalingan	3,554	5.78	▼27.17
Independent	Siddaiah	1,910	3.10	New
Independent	T. D. Khande Rao	1,747	2.84	New
Margin of victory		4,525	7.35	▼7.82
Turnout		62,983	61.65	▼16.57
Total valid votes		61,538		
Rejected ballots		1,445	2.29	▼0.08
Registered electors		102,160		▲14.95
INC gain from INC(I)		Swing	▼6.23	

=== Assembly Election 1978 ===
1978 Karnataka Legislative Assembly election : Sakleshpur
Party	Candidate	Votes	%	±%
INC(I)	J. D. Somappa	32,658	48.12	New
JP	B. B. Shivappa	22,361	32.95	New
INC	Lokeshgowda. D. S	11,985	17.66	▼45.51
Independent	Siddegowda. A. V	689	1.02	New
Margin of victory		10,297	15.17	▼24.70
Turnout		69,519	78.22	▲17.54
Total valid votes		67,869		
Rejected ballots		1,650	2.37	▲2.37
Registered electors		88,876		▲20.94
INC(I) gain from INC		Swing	▼15.05	

=== Assembly Election 1972 ===
1972 Mysore State Legislative Assembly election : Sakleshpur
Party	Candidate	Votes	%	±%
INC	K. M. Rudrappa	27,233	63.17	▲15.91
INC(O)	M. N. Venkataramana	10,046	23.30	New
ABJS	D. S. Lokesha	4,025	9.34	New
SWA	Puttaiah	1,807	4.19	▼48.55
Margin of victory		17,187	39.87	▲34.38
Turnout		44,591	60.68	▼16.30
Total valid votes		43,111		
Registered electors		73,488		▲25.73
INC gain from SWA		Swing	▲10.43	

=== Assembly Election 1967 ===
1967 Mysore State Legislative Assembly election : Sakleshpur
Party	Candidate	Votes	%	±%
SWA	K. P. Chikkegowda	22,650	52.74	New
INC	B. G. Gurappa	20,293	47.26	▼16.04
Margin of victory		2,357	5.49	▼29.14
Turnout		44,994	76.98	▲21.27
Total valid votes		42,943		
Registered electors		58,449		▲1.37
SWA gain from INC		Swing	▼10.56	

=== Assembly Election 1962 ===
1962 Mysore State Legislative Assembly election : Sakleshpur
Party	Candidate	Votes	%	±%
INC	S. A. Vasanna Setty	18,623	63.30	New
ABJS	N. B. Shetty	8,437	28.68	New
CPI	S. M. John Taylor	2,358	8.02	New
Margin of victory		10,186	34.63	
Turnout		32,120	55.71	
Total valid votes		29,418		
Registered electors		57,659		
INC win (new seat)				

== See also ==
- List of constituencies of the Karnataka Legislative Assembly
- Hassan district
