= H. K. Suresh =

Indian politician (born 1971)

Hullalli K. Suresh (born 1971) is an Indian politician from Karnataka. He is a member of the Karnataka Legislative Assembly from Belur Assembly constituency in Hassan district. He represents Bharatiya Janata Party and won the 2023 Karnataka Legislative Assembly election.

== Early life and education ==
Suresh is born in Belur to Kempe Gowda. He runs his own business. He completed his Civil Engineering in 1991 from Amaragin Polytechnic, Arasikere, Hassan District.

== Career ==
Suresh won the Belur Assembly seat representing Bharatiya Janata Party in the 2023 Karnataka Legislative Assembly election. He polled 63,571 votes and defeated his nearest rival, B. Shivaramu of Indian National Congress, by a margin of 7.736 votes. In the 2018 Karnataka Legislative Assembly election he polled 44,578 votes as a BJP candidate but lost to KS Lingesha of Janata Dal (Secular) by a margin of 19,690 votes.

In March 2025, he demanded compensation to the kin of the two people who died in a private building collapse in Belur, Hassan district. He alleged that the negligence of the municipal authorities caused the tragedy.
