= B. B. Shivappa =

Indian politician

Belooru Basappa Shivappa

Member of Karnataka Legislative Council
- In office 19 March 2013 – 20 June 2014
- Preceded by: Vijay Sankeshwar
- Constituency: Nominated
- In office 1 July 1984 – 30 June 1990
- Constituency: elected by Legislative Assembly Members

Member of Karnataka Legislative Assembly
- In office 1994–2004
- Preceded by: Gurudev
- Succeeded by: H. M. Vishwanath
- Constituency: Sakleshpur

President Bharatiya Janata Party, Karnataka
- In office 1983–1988
- Preceded by: A. K. Subbaiah
- Succeeded by: B. S. Yediyurappa

Personal details
- Born: 19 September 1929 Somwarpet, Kodagu; Karnataka
- Died: 31 July 2017 (aged 87)
- Party: Bharatiya Janata Party
- Spouse: Smt. Susheela
- Profession: Politician

B. B. Shivappa (19 September 1929 – 31 July 2017) was a senior Bharatiya Janata Party (BJP) leader and one of the founders of the BJP in Karnataka, India. He has the distinction of having been elected in both houses of Karnataka Legislature.

== Early life and political career ==
Shivappa was born on 19 September 1929 in Somwarpet, Coorg State (present day Karnataka). He belonged to Lingayat community.

His political career began with his initial association with Congress (O) before joining Janata Party. He later became one of the founding fathers of the BJP Karnataka. He was the second state President of the party after A. K. Subbaiah in 1983.

In 1984, he was elected to the Karnataka Legislative Council from the legislative assembly and continued to be the member of the house till 1990. He later went on to contest elections from Sakleshpur and was elected in 1994 for the first time. He was re-elected in 1999 and continued to be a member till 2004.

Following the ouster of Yediyurappa from the BJP in 2012, he was nominated as Member of Karnataka Legislative Council for the remainder term of Vijay Sankeshwar who had quit as MLC to join Karnataka Janata Paksha led by Yediyurappa.
