= Rudresh Gowda =

Indian politician

Member of Lok Sabha
- In office 15 May 1996 – 4 December 1997
- Succeeded by: H. D. Deve Gowda
- Constituency: Hassan

Member of the Legislative Assembly
- In office 22 May 2008 – 23 March 2018
- Succeeded by: K. S. Lingesha
- Constituency: Belur

Personal details
- Born: Rudresh Gowda; 17 October 1955 Belur, Karnataka, India
- Died: 24 March 2018 (aged 62) Bangalore, Karnataka, India
- Party: Indian National Congress (2004– 2018) , Janata Dal (Secular) (1999-2004) , Janata Party (1985-1999)
- Children: 2
- Education: LLB

Rudresh Gowda (16 October 1955 – 24 March 2018) was an Indian politician.

Gowda trained to be a lawyer. He joined the Janata Party in 1985 and was elected to the Hassan District Council until 1996. Gowda sat in the 11th Lok Sabha, representing Janata Dal and the Janata Party between 1996 and 1997. He left Janata Dal (Secular) in 2004 for the Indian National Congress. Gowda won election to the Karnataka Legislative Assembly as a representative of Belur in 2008 and 2013. He suffered a heart attack on 23 March 2018 and died of multiple organ failure the next day at a hospital in Bangalore, aged 62.
