= H. S. Prakash =

Indian politician

H.S.Prakash

Member of the Legislative Assembly of Karnataka for Hassan
- In office 8 May 2013 – 16 May 2018
- In office May 2008 – May 2013
- In office May 2004 – October 2007
- In office December 1994 – August 1999

Personal details
- Born: 13 September 1951 Hassan, Mysore State, India
- Died: 27 November 2018 (aged 67) Hassan, India
- Party: Janata Dal (Secular)
- Spouse: Lalitha Prakash
- Children: 2 sons, 1 daughter
- Occupation: Agriculture

Hassan Sanniah Prakash (13 September 1951 – 27 November 2018) was an Indian politician and a four-term MLA in the state of Karnataka, representing the Hassan constituency. He was a member of Janata Dal (Secular). Prakash served as a member of Hassan city municipal council from 1983 to 1989, and was president of the municipal council from 1985 to 1987. He was elected for the fourth time as a member of the legislative assembly in the 2013 Karnataka state assembly election.

He was first elected as MLA for the Hassan constituency in the 1994 election. He unsuccessfully contested the next elections in 1999, but was elected again in the 2004, 2008 and 2013 Karnataka state assembly elections. His son Swaroop Prakash is the present sitting MLA from Hassan assembly constituency.

He was also the chairman of Sanjeevini co-operative hospital from 2001, co-founded by Dr. A. C. Munivenkate Gowda and Dr. Gururaj Hebbar, which also runs an institution H. D. Deve Gowda college of nursing and paramedical science.
