= Swaroop Prakash =

Indian politician

Swaroop Prakash MLA

Member of Karnataka Legislative Assembly
- Incumbent
- Assumed office May 2023
- Constituency: Hassan

Personal details
- Party: Janata Dal (Secular)
- As of September, 2023

Swaroop Prakash (born 1983) is an Indian politician from Karnataka. He is elected to Karnataka Legislative Assembly from Hassan constituency representing Janata Dal (Secular).

== Early life ==
Prakash is from Hassan. He is the son of former MLA H. S. Prakash. He runs his own business and his wife is a doctor. He completed his graduation in Engineering in 2001 from Bahubali Engineering College, Shravanabelagola.

== Career ==
He has earlier served as a Zilla panchayat member from Kandli constituency, Hassan district and vice president of Hassan Zilla Panchayat. He won the 2023 Karnataka Legislative Assembly election from Hassan Assembly constituency representing Janata Dal (Secular). He polled 85,176 votes and defeated his nearest rival, Preetham J. Gowda of Bharatiya Janata Party, by a margin of 7,854 votes.
