= Hassan Chickmagalur Lok Sabha constituency =

Former constituency of the Indian parliament in Karnataka

Coordinates: 13.2°N 75.9°E

Hassan Chickmagalur
- Former Lok Sabha constituency

Constituency details
- Country: India
- Region: South India
- State: Karnataka
- Established: 1952
- Abolished: 1957
- Reservation: None

Hassan Chickmagalur Lok Sabha constituency was a former Lok Sabha constituency in Mysore State (Karnataka from 1952 to 1956). This seat came into existence in 1951 and ceased to exist in 1956, before 1957 Lok Sabha Elections. This constituency was later merged with Hassan Lok Sabha constituency and later got spitted to Hassan and Chikmagalur Lok Sabha constituencies during 1967 Lok Sabha Elections. Major portion of Chikmagalur district got merged to Udupi Chikmagalur Lok Sabha constituency with the implementation of the delimitation of parliamentary constituencies in 2008.

== Members of Parliament ==
Election	Name	Party
1952	H.Siddananjappa	Indian National Congress

== Election results ==
=== 1951 ===
1951 Indian general election: Hassan Chikmagalur
Party	Candidate	Votes	%	±%
INC	H. Siddananjappa	116,561	67.83	
Socialist	S. Sivappa	55,289	32.17	
Majority		61,272	35.66	
Turnout		171,850	48.52	
INC win (new seat)				

== See also ==
- Hassan Lok Sabha constituency
- Chikmagalur Lok Sabha constituency
- Udupi Chikmagalur Lok Sabha constituency
- Hassan district
- Chikmagalur district
- List of former constituencies of the Lok Sabha
