= K. M. Shivalinge Gowda =

Indian politician

- Minister Shivalinge Gowda addressing a press conference in September 2026.

Minister of Excise, Government of Karnataka
- Incumbent
- Assumed office 12 August 2026
- Governor: Thawar Chand Gehlot; Sudha Yadav
- Chief Minister: D. K. Shivakumar
- Preceded by: R. B. Timmapur

Member of the Karnataka Legislative Assembly
- Incumbent
- Assumed office 2008
- Preceded by: A. S. Basavaraju
- Constituency: Arsikere

Personal details
- Born: 14 February 1958 (age 68) Kudukundi, Arsikere taluk, Hassan district, Karnataka
- Party: Indian National Congress (2023–present), Janata Dal (Secular) (until 2023)
- Spouse: H. D. Pushpavathi
- Children: 3

K. M. Shivalinge Gowda (born 14 February 1958) is an Indian politician from Karnataka who serves as the Minister for Excise in the Government of Karnataka. He is a four-time member of the Karnataka Legislative Assembly from Arsikere Assembly constituency. He belongs to the Indian National Congress.

A legislator from the Janata Dal (Secular) for three terms (2008-2023), Gowda quit the party ahead of the 2023 Karnataka Legislative Assembly election and joined the Congress, and won the Arsikere constituency for the fourth consecutive term.

He was inducted to the Karnataka Cabinet for the first time on 3 August 2026. He also serves as the minister in charge of Hassan district.

== Early life and education ==
Shivalinge Gowda was born on 14 February 1958 in Kudukundi village in Arsikere Taluk of Hassan District to Manje Gowda and Dyavamma.

== Early political career ==
Gowda's involvement in politics began during his students days when he served as secretary of the students' union at Government College, Hassan, and later as a director of the Gandasi Seva Sahakara Sangha - a local cooperative institution.

He later served as a member of the Hassan Zilla Panchayat from 2001 to 2006 during which period he first contested an Assembly election.

== Political career ==
=== 2004 Assembly election - defeat ===
He first contested a Karnataka Assembly Election in 2004 on Janata Dal (Secular) ticket from the then Gandasi Constituency in Hassan. But, he lost to Congress candidate B. Shivaramu by 18 votes.

=== As member of Legislative Assembly from JD(S) ===
Gowda was elected as MLA for the first time in 2008 from Arsikere as a JD(S) candidate. He defeated the Congress candidate G. V. Siddappa by a comfortable margin of 34,226 votes.

He was re-elected from the same constituency in 2013 by defeating the Congress candidate B. Shivaramu by a margin of 29,631 votes.

In the 2018 Assembly election, he won the same constituency for the third consecutive time. He defeated the Congress candidate G. B. Shashidhara by a good margin of 43,689 votes.

=== As Karnataka Housing Board (KHB) chairman ===
In February 2019, during the Congress-JD(S) government headed by Chief Minister H. D. Kumaraswamy, Gowda was appointed chairman of the Karnataka Housing Board (KHB).

He was reappointed chairman of the Board in January 2024, when the Congress government under Chief Minister Siddaramaiah appointed several legislators to head state-run boards and corporations. This is a position that carries Cabinet rank.

=== Quitting JD(S) and joining Congress ===
By the end of his third term in the Assembly, Gowda developed differences with the JD(S) leadership and submitted his resignation as an MLA to Karnataka Assembly Speaker Vishweshwar Hegde Kageri on 2 April 2023.

By stating that his supporters in his constituency favoured his move to the Congress, he formally joined the party on 9 April 2023 at a programme held in Arsikere. He was welcomed into the party by Karnataka Congress leaders Siddaramaiah and D. K. Shivakumar.

=== 2023 Assembly election - elected as Congress MLA ===
The Congress fielded Gowda from Arsikere in the 2023 Assembly election. He defeated JD(S) candidate N. R. Santhosh by a margin of 20,177 votes and was elected to a fourth consecutive term as the MLA from Arsikere.

=== 2026 - As minister ===
On August 3, 2026, Gowda took oath as a Cabinet minister in the government headed by Chief Minister D. K. Shivakumar. On 12 August, he was allocated the Excise portfolio. He was subsequently assigned responsibility as the minister in charge of Hassan district.

== Personal life ==
Gowda is married to H. D. Pushpavathi. The couple has three children: a son, and two daughters.

In 2011, his elder daughter, S. Manasa, drew public attention when she chose to marry in a mass marriage ceremony held in Arsikere. His younger daughter, Shubhashree also married at a similar ceremony in Arsikere in February 2013.

His son, Dr. Adarsh S. Gowda is a medical professional and is also involved in public service via youth and community actitivities.
