= H. K. Kumaraswamy =

Indian politician

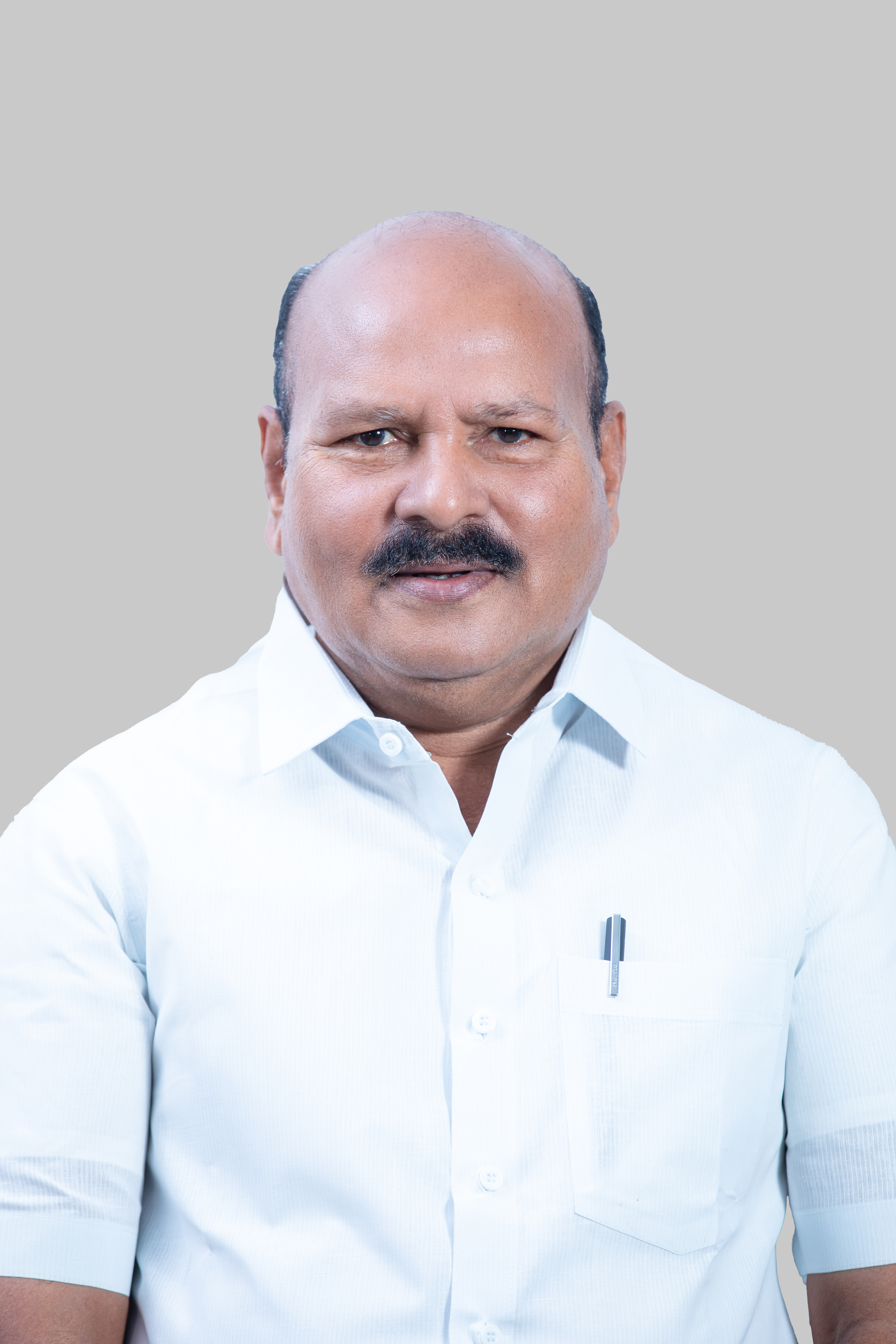

Member of Karnataka Legislative Assembly
- In office 2008–2018
- Preceded by: H. M. Vishwanath
- Succeeded by: Cement Manju
- Constituency: Sakleshpur

Personal details
- Born: 31 May 1955 (age 70) Kuppagadde
- Party: Janata Dal (Secular) (since 1984)
- Spouse: C. T. Chanchala Kumari
- Children: 3
- Education: B.Sc., B.Ed., LLB
- Profession: Politician, coffee planter

H. K. Kumaraswamy (born 31 May 1955) is an Indian politician and a six-time member of the Karnataka Legislative Assembly. As of 2018, he has been the MLA for the Sakaleshpur constituency for the third consecutive term and serves as the JD(S) parliamentary board chairman.

He has served as JD(S) state president and as the Cabinet Minister for Women and Child Welfare in the Karnataka government.

== Personal life ==
Kumaraswamy is married to C.T. Chanchala Kumari. He has a son and two daughters.
