= Venkata Rao III =

- Raja of Sandur
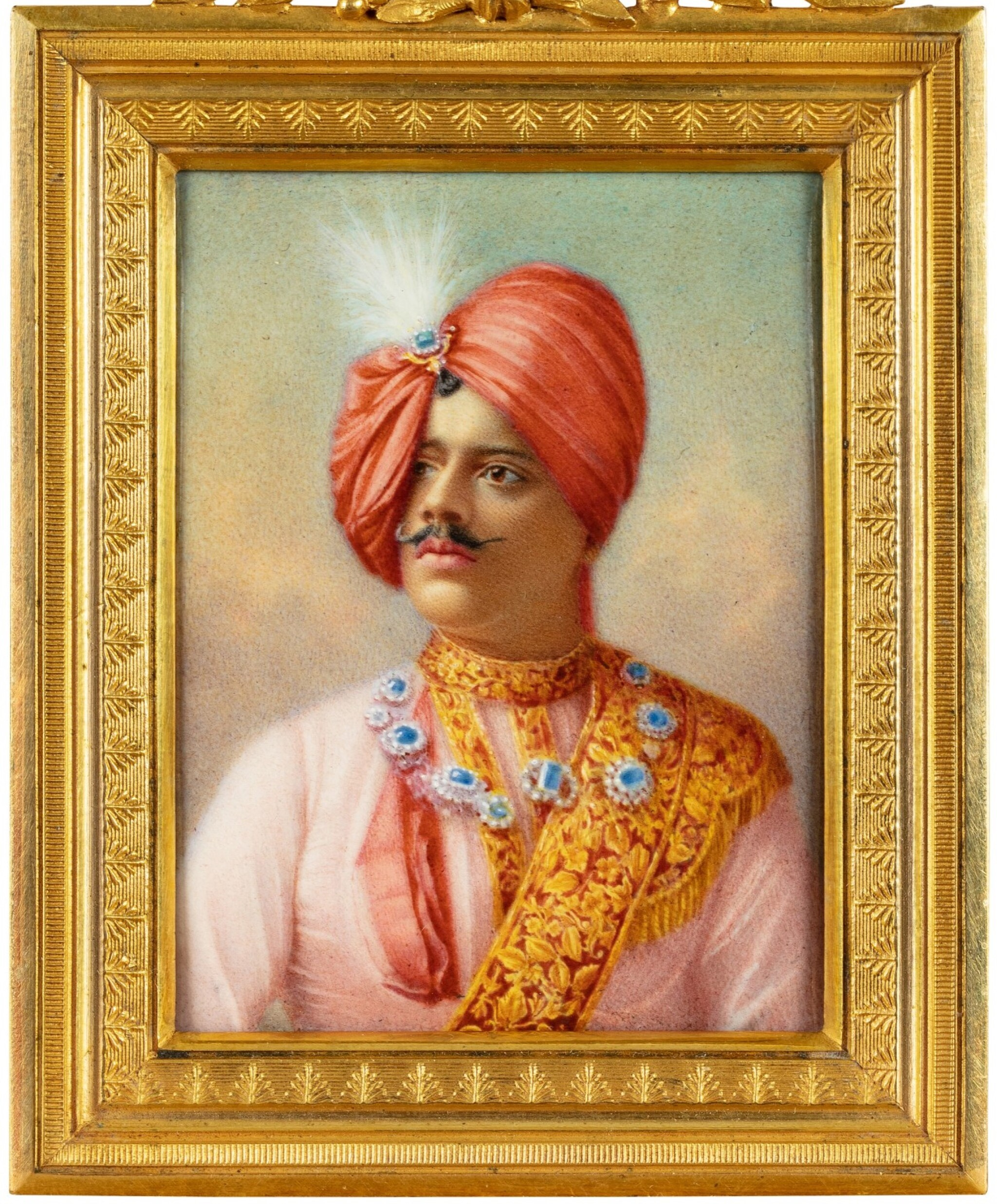
- Portrait by Raoul Hideux, 1915
- Reign: 3 December 1892 – 24 July 1927
- Coronation: 1893
- Predecessor: Ramachandra Vitthala Rao
- Regent: Srimanth Maloji Rao Bala Sahib
- Successor: Venkata Rao III
- Born: 10 July 1892; Sanduru
- Died: 24 July 1927 (aged 35); Sanduru
Names
- Srimant Raja Venkata Rao Rao Sahib Hindurao Ghorpade Senapati Mamalikat Madar
Regnal name
- Srimant Raja Venkata Rao Rao Sahib Hindurao Ghorpade, Raja of Sandur
- House: Ghorpade Dynasty
- Religion: Hinduism

Raja Shrimant Venkatarao Ramchandrarao Ghorpade (10 July 1892 – 24 July 1927) was the ruler of the princely state of Sandur from 1892 to 1927. The state was administered by a council of regency till 1913 when he was invested with full ruling powers. Venkata Rao was a recipient of the 1903 Delhi Durbar and 1911 Delhi Durbar medals. On his death in 1927 and in the absence of a male heir, Venkata Rao was succeeded as ruler by his cousin Yeshwantrao Ghorpade.

Venkata Rao III Ghorpade Dynasty Born: 10 July 1892 Died: 24 July 1927
Regnal titles
Preceded by Ramachandra Vitthala Rao	Raja of Sandur; 1892–1927	Succeeded by Yeshwantrao Ghorpade
