= Shivashanmukha Rao =

- Raja of Sandur
- Reign: 1861 - 3 May 1878
- Coronation: 1863
- Predecessor: Venkata Rao II
- Successor: Ramachandra Vitthala Rao
- Born: 17 October 1847; Sanduru
- Died: 3 May 1878 (aged 30); Bellary
Names
- Srimant Raja Shivahsanmukha Rao Vitthala Rao Hindurao Ghorpade
- House: Ghorpade Dynasty
- Religion: Hinduism

Shivashanmukha Rao (17 October 1847 - 3 May 1878) was a member of the Ghorpade Dynasty who served as the Raja of Sandur State from 1861 to 1878. His reign was noted for its progressive reforms.

== Early life ==
Shivashanmukha Rao was born on 17 October 1847 to Venkata Rao II, the reigning Raja of Sandur. Being the eldest son, Shivashanmukha Rao was heir-apparent to the throne. Shivashanmukha Rao was educated in private.

== Reign ==
When Venkata Rao died in 1861, 14-year old Shivashanmukha Rao ascended the throne. As he was yet a minor, the administration was handled by a regency. Shivashanmukha Rao did not have a full formal coronation till 1863, when his sanad was renewed by the Madras government. In 1876, he was accorded the title of "Raja" by the British.

As soon as he assumed the throne in 1863, Shivashanmukha Rao selected J. Macartney, a missionary of the LMS as his agent and advisor. During his tenure, Macartney introduced many reforms and improved the administration of the state. Macartney retired in 1885 and was succeeded by J. G. Firth, a former tahsildar of Bellary.

Venkata Rao was a recipient of the Prince of Wales medal (1876). In 1877, he was awarded a Kaisar-i-Hind Medal on the occasion of the Delhi Durbar.

== Personal life ==
Shivashanmukha Rao was the oldest surviving son of Venkata Rao through his six wives. He married Rani Sundarabai Ghorpade and they had two sons - Vittal Rao and Maloji Rao, both of whom predeceased their father.

== Death ==
Shivashanmukha Rao died at Sandur on 3 May 1878 after a long illness. As he did not have sons of his own, Shivashanmukha Rao was succeeded as Raj by his younger brother Ramachandra Vitthala Rao.
