= Ramachandra Vitthala Rao =

- Raja of Sandur
- Reign: 3 May 1878 - 3 December 1892
- Coronation: 5 February 1879
- Predecessor: Shivashanmukha Rao
- Successor: Venkata Rao III
- Born: 29 March 1850; Sanduru
- Died: 3 December 1892 (aged 42); Bellary
Names
- Srimant Raja Ramachandrarao Vitthala Rao Hindurao Ghorpade
- House: Ghorpade Dynasty
- Religion: Hinduism

Raja Srimant Ramachandrarao Vitthala Rao Ghorpade CIE (29 March 1850 – 3 December 1892) was a member of the Ghorpade Dynasty who served as the Maharaja of the princely state of Sandur from 1878 to 1892.

== Early life ==
Ramachandra Vitthala Rao was born on 29 March 1850 in Sanduru to Venkata Rao, the Raja of Sandur, a princely state under the jurisdiction of the Bellary District of the Madras Presidency. Ramachandra Vitthala Rao was educated in private.

== Reign ==
Ramachandra Vitthala Rao succeeded his brother Shivashanmukha Rao as Raja on 3 May 1878 when the latter died without any offspring. Ramachandra Vitthala Rao celebrated his official coronation on 5 February 1879. In 1882, Ramachandra Vitthala Rao leased 40,000 acres of forests in Sandur state to the Madras government. In September 1885, J. G. Firth a retired tahsildar in Bellary was appointed the Agent of the Madras government to Sandur state. He was subsequently appointed as the first diwan of Sandur. Ramachandra Vitthala Rao was made a Companion of the Order of the Indian Empire in July 1892.

== Death ==
Ramachandra Vitthala Rao died on 3 December 1892 at Bellary where he had gone for treatment. Ramachandra Vitthala Rao was succeeded by his son Venkata Rao III.

Ramachandra Vitthala Rao Ghorpade Dynasty Born: 28 March 1850
Regnal titles
Preceded by Shivashanmukha Rao	Raja of Sandur; 1878–1892	Succeeded by Venkata Rao III
