= 55 Mallapura =

- village
- Location in Karnataka, India 55 Mallapura (India)
- Coordinates: 15.030310°N 76.419000°E
- Country: India
- State: Karnataka
- District: Bellary
- Talukas: Sandur

Government
  - Body: Gram panchayat Village Panchayat

Languages
  - Official: Kannada
- Time zone: UTC+5:30 (IST)
- ISO 3166 code: IN-KA
- Vehicle registration: KA
- Nearest city: Bellary
- Civic agency: Village Panchayat
- Website: karnataka.gov.in

55 Mallapura is a village in the southern state of Karnataka, India. It is located in the Sandur taluk of Bellary district in Karnataka.

== See also ==
- Bellary
- Districts of Karnataka
