= Sandur State Council =

1931 council of princely Indian state

Sandur State Council, also known as Praja Mandal, was the name of the lower house of the bicameral legislative council of Sandur State. It was representative in nature and was inaugurated on 20 April 1931 by the Raja of Sandur, Yeshwantrao Ghorpade through the Sandur State Council (Prajamandal) Act of 1931 with a total of 25 members, 21 of whom were elected and the rest, nominated. The upper house was called Durbar and consisted of the landed aristocracy.
