= Santosh Lad =

Indian politician

Santosh S Lad
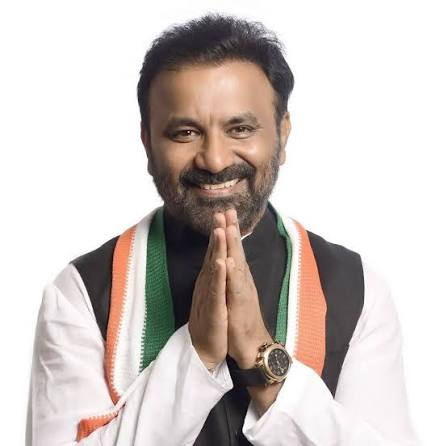

Cabinet Minister Government of Karnataka
- Incumbent
- Assumed office 27 May 2023
- Cabinet: Shivakumar ministry Second Siddaramaiah ministry
- Chief Minister: D. K. Shivakumar; Siddaramaiah
- Ministry and Departments: Labour
- In office 2013–2013
- Cabinet: First Siddaramaiah ministry
- Chief Minister: Siddaramaiah
- Ministry and Departments: Labour; Information & Infrastructure (MOS)

Member of Karnataka Legislative Assembly
- In office 2016–2018
- Preceded by: C. M. Nimbannavar
- Constituency: Kalghatgi-Alnavar
- In office 2008–2018
- Preceded by: Siddanagouda Chikkanagoudra
- Succeeded by: C. M. Nimbannavar
- Constituency: Kalghatgi-Alnavar
- In office 2004–2008
- Preceded by: Venkatrao Ghorpade
- Succeeded by: E. Tukaram
- Constituency: Sandur

Personal details
- Born: 27 February 1975 (age 51) Sandur, Bellary, Karnataka, India
- Party: Indian National Congress
- Spouse: Keerthi
- Website: https://santoshlad.com/, https://www.santoshladfoundation.org/

Santosh Shivaji Lad (born 27 February 1975) is an Indian politician from Karnataka and a member of the Indian National Congress. He has been elected to the Karnataka Legislative Assembly four times, first from Sandur in 2004 and subsequently from Kalaghatgi in 2008, 2013 and 2023. He currently serves as the Cabinet Minister for Labour and Employment in Government of Karnataka, and is a member of Karnataka Legislative Assembly representing Kalaghatgi-Alnavar constituency in the Dharwad district of Karnataka state.

Lad has served as a minister in successive Karnataka government. He served as Minister of State for Information and Infrastructure Development in the Siddaramaiah ministry from 2013, resigned from the ministry in November 2013 following allegations concerning illegal mining involving his company, and returned to the state cabinet in 2016 as Labour Minister, later also holding the Skill Development portfolio.

He was re-elected from Kalaghatgi in 2023 and appointed Labour Minister in the second Siddaramaiah ministry. He subsequently continued in the Labour portfolio after the 2026 reconstitution of the Karnataka cabinet, where the Karnataka Legislative Assembly lists him as Minister for Labour and Employment.

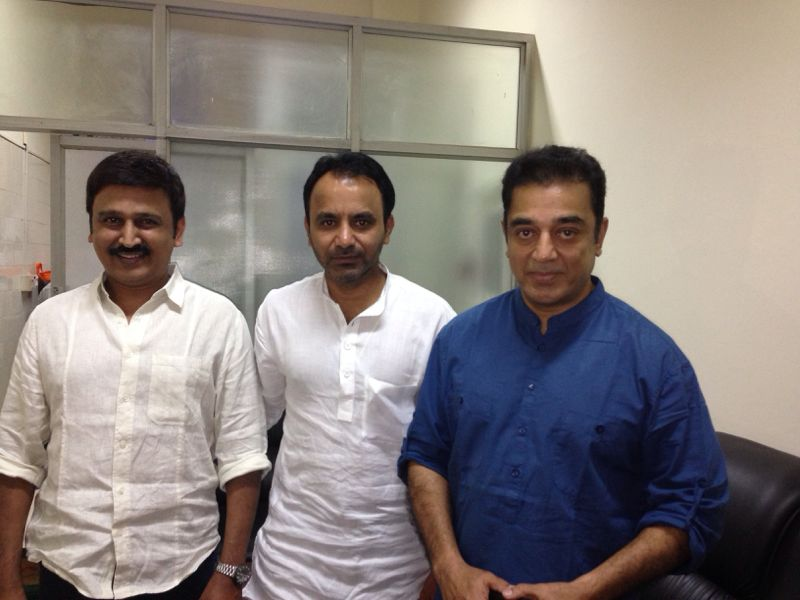
Santosh Lad with South Indian Actors

== Early life and education ==
Santosh Lad, son of Shailaja and Lt. Shivaji Lad, was born on 27 February 1975 in Sandur taluk of Karnataka's Bellary district. He has one elder sister. Lad completed a Bachelor of Commerce degree from SESS College, Sandur, in 1997, according to his election affidavit.

Lad's family has been associated with business interests in Sandur and the Ballari region. His professional occupation was listed as business/entrepreneur in his 2023 election affidavit.

== Political career ==
=== Early political career ===
According to Lad's published biography, he began his political career through the Sandur municipal council in 2002.

He contested the 2004 Karnataka Legislative Assembly election from the Sandur constituency as a candidate of the Janata Dal (Secular). He defeated Congress candidate V. Y. Ghorpade, receiving 65,600 votes against Ghorpade's 30,022, a margin of 35,578 votes.

Lad subsequently joined the Indian National Congress in 2007.

=== Kalaghatgi ===
Following the 2008 delimitation of Karnataka's constituencies, Lad contested the Kalaghatgi Assembly constituency on a Congress ticket. He defeated BJP candidate C. M. Nimbannavar by 11,642 votes, receiving 49,733 votes.

In the 2013 Karnataka Legislative Assembly election, Lad was re-elected from Kalaghatgi. He received 76,802 votes, defeating his nearest rival by more than 45,000 votes.

In 2018, Lad contested Kalaghatgi again but was defeated by BJP candidate C. M. Nimbannavar. Nimbannavar received 83,267 votes compared with Lad's 57,270, a margin of 25,997 votes.

Lad returned to the Assembly in the 2023 Karnataka election. He won Kalaghatgi with 85,761 votes, defeating BJP candidate Nagaraj Chebbi, who received 71,404 votes. The margin was 14,357 votes.

=== Ministerial career ===
==== Information and Infrastructure Development ====
In 2013, Lad was appointed as Minister of State for Information and Infrastructure Development in the Congress government headed by Chief Minister Siddaramaiah.

As minister in charge of Dharwad district, Lad was involved in reviewing district-level development and administrative issues.

==== 2013 resignation ====
In November 2013, Lad resigned from the Karnataka cabinet following allegations relating to illegal mining involving V. S. Lad & Sons, a company associated with his family. Contemporary reports stated that the company had been accused of illegal extraction and supply/export of iron ore. Lad said he resigned to avoid embarrassment to the Congress government and described his decision as a moral one.

The resignation followed scrutiny of mining activity in the Ballari region and allegations concerning the classification of the company's mining lease. Reporting at the time also noted that the Karnataka Lokayukta had raised allegations concerning the company's mining activities.

==== Labour and Skill Development, 2016–2018 ====
Lad returned to the Karnataka cabinet in June 2016 as Labour Minister during a cabinet reshuffle under Chief Minister Siddaramaiah.

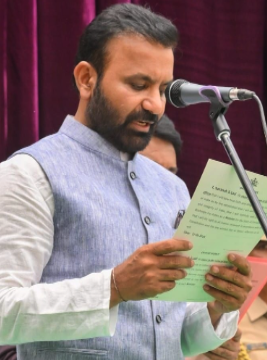
Santosh Lad Swearing in as Labour Minister

In 2017, he was given the additional charge of Skill Development.

As Labour Minister, Lad publicly supported women's participation in night-shift employment and opposed recommendations that women should be restricted from night work because of domestic responsibilities.

==== Return to government in 2023 ====
Lad was re-elected from Kalaghatgi in the 2023 Karnataka Assembly election and was inducted into Siddaramaiah's cabinet on 27 May 2023 as Minister for Labour.

He was also appointed minister in charge of Dharwad district in June 2023.

==== Labour and Employment, 2026-present ====
Lad is Inducted as Labour and Employment Minister of DK Shivakumar's Cabinet after reconstitution of Karnataka in 2026.

He is also entrusted with responsibility of overseeing Dharwad District as In charge Minister.

== Rescue and relief operations ==
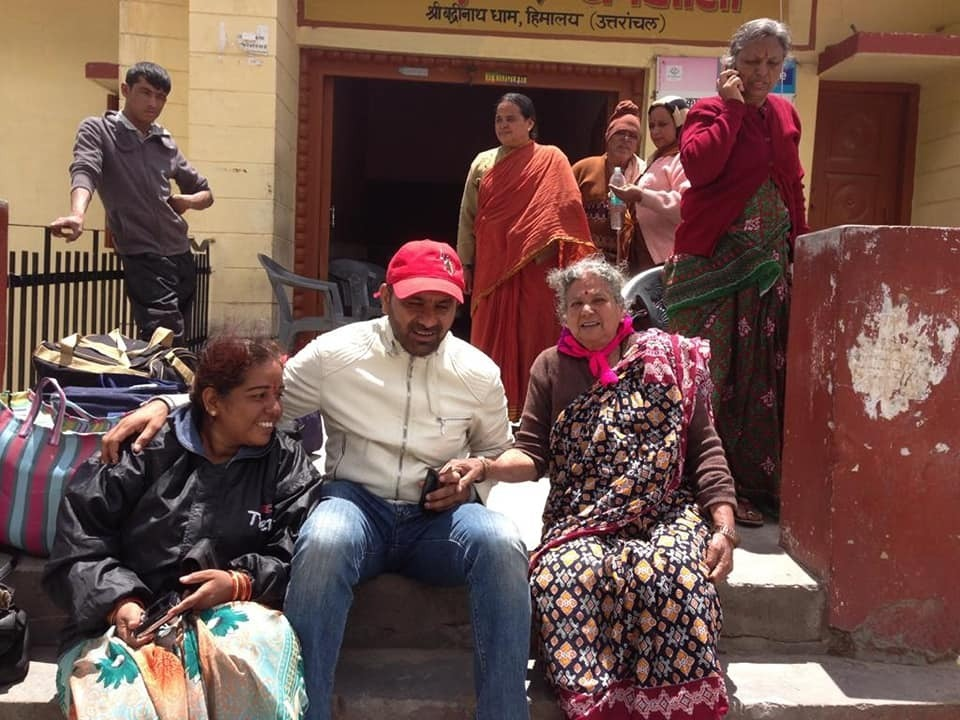
Santosh Lad in Uttarakhand rescue operation

=== 2013 Uttarakhand floods ===
During the 2013 Uttarakhand floods, Lad was assigned responsibility for coordinating rescue and relief operations involving stranded Kannadigas. Reporting from the disaster area described Lad and a team of officials, doctors and nurses providing food, water, medicines and evacuation assistance to stranded pilgrims.

The New Indian Express reported that the team had helped evacuate more than 1,000 pilgrims from Karnataka during the operation.

=== 2023 Odisha train accident ===
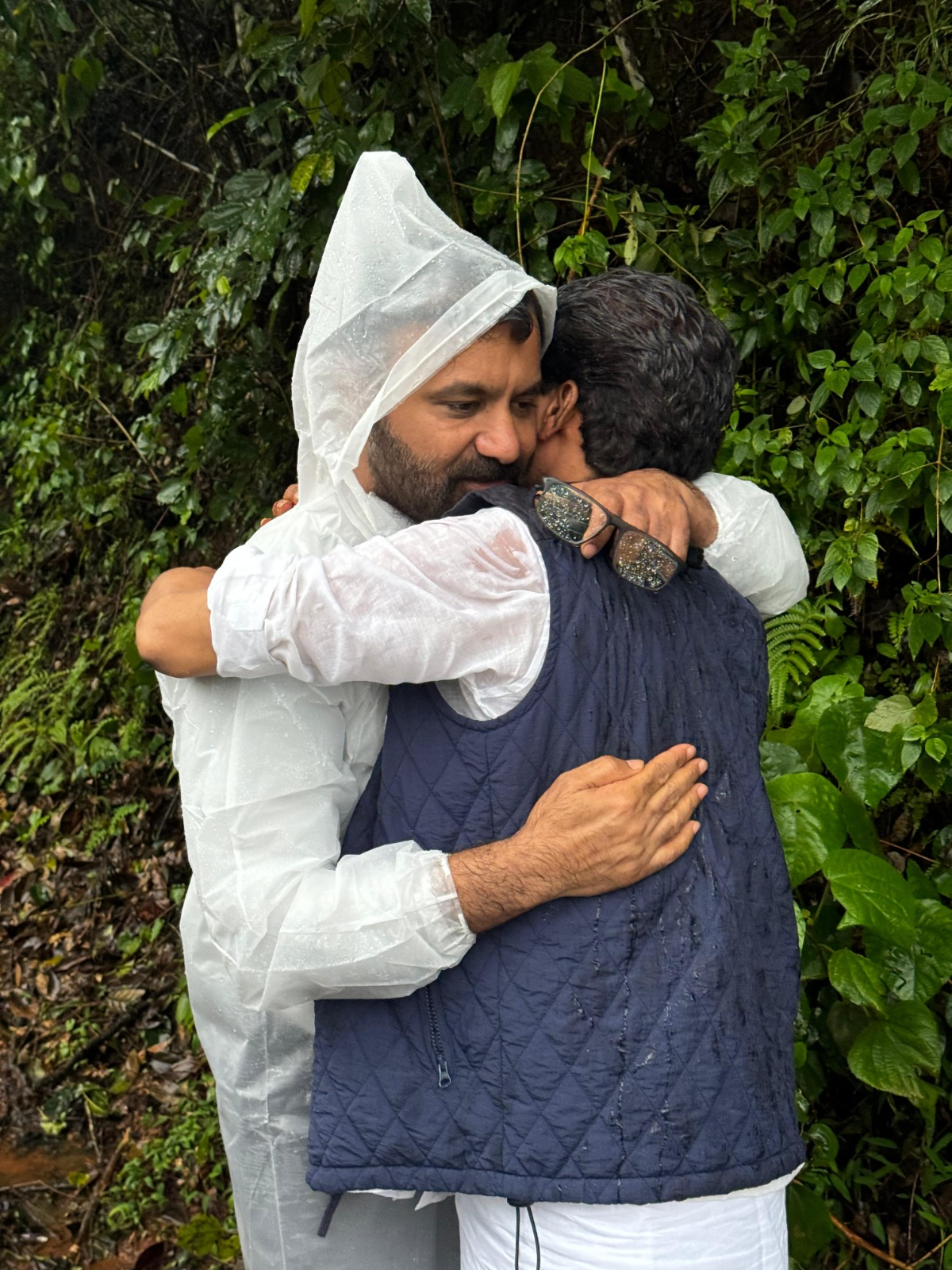
Santosh Lad in Wayanad Landslide Rescue Operation

Following the Balasore train accident in Odisha in June 2023, Chief Minister Siddaramaiah appointed Lad to coordinate rescue and assistance for Kannadigas affected by the disaster. He was directed to travel to the site and assist injured people from Karnataka.

=== 2024 Wayanad landslides ===
In August 2024, the Karnataka government deputed Lad to assist rescue and relief operations in Wayanad, Kerala, following devastating landslides. He camped in the affected area and coordinated with the Kerala government and Karnataka officials concerning people from Karnataka who were stranded or affected.

=== 2025 Pahalgam Rescue Operation ===
At the time of Pahalgam terror attack April 2025, Santosh Lad was instructed to reach Kashmir and rescue people of Karnataka over three intense days, he coordinated the safe return of 177 Kannadigas from different parts of Kashmir.

== Labour minister ==
Lad's second period as Labour Minister has been marked by measures concerning gig workers, unorganized workers, minimum wages and women's workplace rights.

=== Gig workers ===
In July 2023, the Karnataka government announced a free life and accident insurance cover of ₹4 lakh for gig workers, consisting of ₹2 lakh each for life and accidental insurance. Lad said the initiative followed representations from gig-worker organizations.

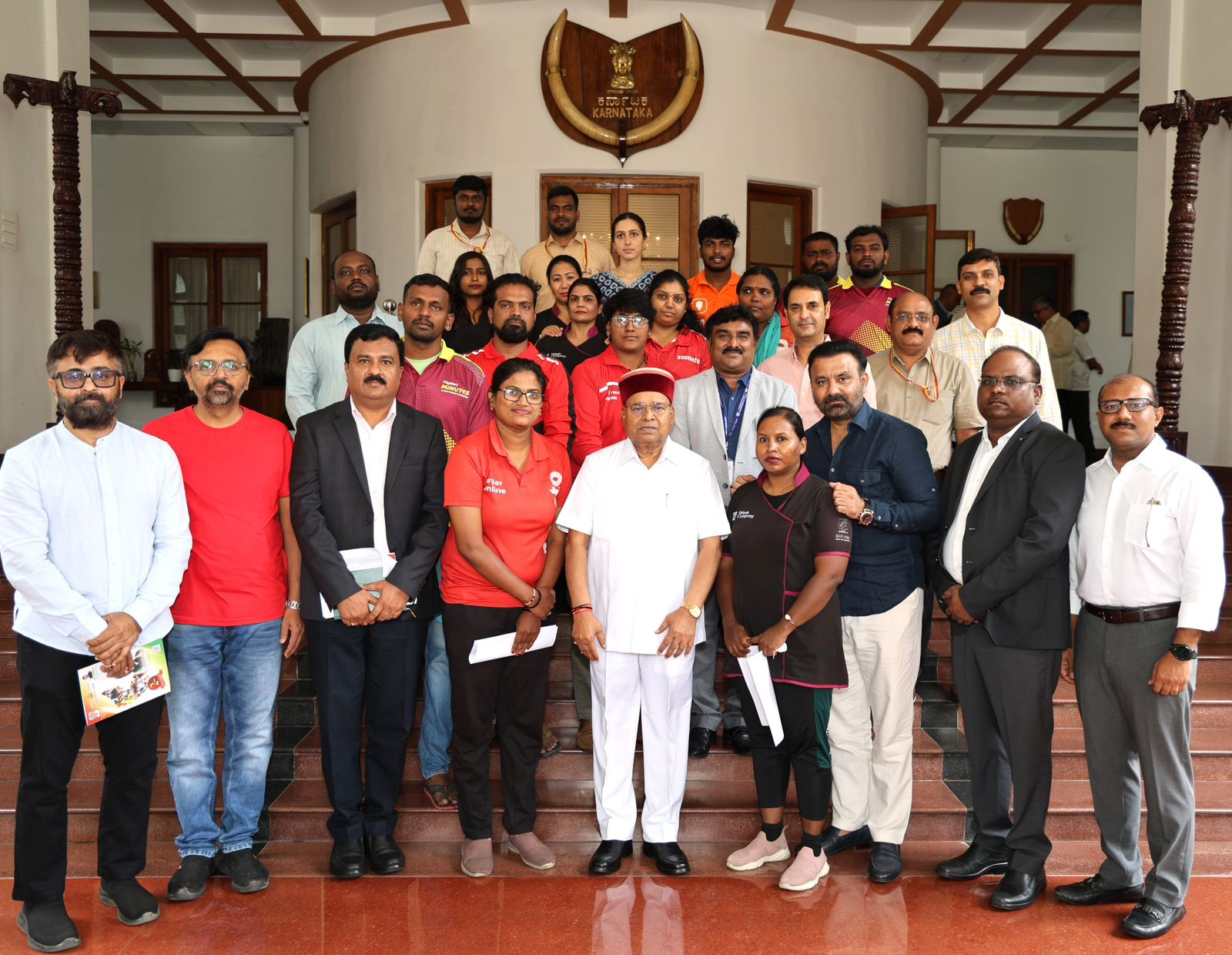
Santosh Lad with Gig Workers representing workers organizations.

The Labour Department subsequently notified the health and insurance cover for gig workers, Lad said the department would develop a portal through which gig workers could apply for the scheme.

In 2025, the Karnataka Legislative Assembly passed the Karnataka Platform Based Gig Workers (Social Security and Welfare) Act, 2025. The legislation created a framework for registration of gig workers and aggregators, a welfare board and welfare fund, social-security obligations, occupational health and safety provisions, and dispute-resolution mechanisms.

The Act applies to platform-based services including ride sharing, food and grocery delivery, logistics, e-marketplace services, healthcare, travel and hospitality, and content and media services. The legislation allows a welfare fee to be levied on aggregators, with the rate to be determined under the statutory framework.

=== Minimum wages ===
In May 2026, the Karnataka government revised minimum wages by approximately 60 percent across 81 scheduled sectors. Under the revised structure, the minimum monthly wage for unskilled workers in the Greater Bengaluru area was reported at ₹23,376, while highly skilled workers were entitled to ₹31,114. Rates elsewhere in Karnataka ranged between ₹19,300 and ₹21,251 depending on location and category.

Lad described the revision as a long-standing demand of the labour community and said the revised framework was intended to provide greater economic security to workers in the unorganized and specified sectors.

=== Menstrual leave policy ===
In October 2025, the Karnataka cabinet approved a policy providing women employees with one paid menstrual-leave day per month, amounting to up to 12 days annually Lad described the measure as a progressive labour policy and said it was intended to support women's health and participation in the workforce.

The policy was subsequently implemented through government orders. In December 2025, Karnataka extended the paid menstrual-leave benefit to women government employees, including contractual workers.

=== Welfare of unorganized workers ===
The Labour Department under Lad has also pursued measures aimed at extending social-security coverage to workers outside conventional organized employment. In 2024, the state introduced the Ambedkar Karmikara Sahaya Hasta Yojane for additional categories of unorganized workers, with benefits including insurance and other forms of assistance.

In 2025, Lad proposed a ₹1-per-litre fuel cess to create a dedicated healthcare fund for unorganized workers. He said such a mechanism could generate substantial resources for worker healthcare and support a proposed health-card system.

=== Cinema and cultural workers ===
In July 2024, the Karnataka Legislative Assembly passed the Karnataka Cine and Cultural Activists (Welfare) Bill, providing for a welfare framework for workers in the cinema and cultural sector. The legislation included a proposed 2 percent cess on movie tickets and OTT subscriptions and provided for a welfare board.

=== Persons with disabilities ===
During 2025, the Karnataka Labour Department worked on a proposed legislative framework for reservations for persons with disabilities in education and private-sector employment. The draft framework proposed up to 10 percent reservation in educational institutions and 5 percent in private-sector employment, subject to legislative and policy processes.

== Political organization ==
Lad served as General Secretary of the Karnataka Pradesh Congress Committee (KPCC) and was given responsibility for Raichur district organization during his earlier period in Congress politics.

In January 2023, the Congress appointed Lad as a co-chairman in the party's Karnataka Assembly election campaign committee, with responsibility for the Belagavi division.

He also participated in Congress's Bharat Jodo Yatra activities in Karnataka in 2022.

Lad started his political career as a counsellor from Sandur taluk. He had very little success in Pattana panchayat elections, where he lost marginally in his first election. He went on to win both seats he contested in the following election, contributing to his party gaining the majority during that period.

Lad contested the MLA election against a strong contender from the Congress Party. He represented the Janata Dal (Secular) party and was the youngest MLA (aged 29), along with the first person from his party to win Sandur constituency; the election was won with a record margin. Lad was part of the government formation under H. D. Kumaraswamy, ex-chief minister of the Karnataka state.

In the 2008 Karnataka Assembly elections, he won the Kalaghatgi constituency in the Dharwad district. He currently is an active member and represents Indian National Congress. In the 2013 Karnataka state assembly election, Santosh Lad won with a margin of over 45,000 votes, to win consecutively for the second time from Kalaghatgi and third time overall. Congress secured an absolute majority to form the government. Santosh Lad was appointed Minister of State for Information and Infrastructure. In 2018, legislative elections, he lost to C.M. Nimbannanavar of the BJP, with a margin of 20,997 votes.

=== Initiatives ===
Santosh Lad was appointed state representative to oversee the rescue operation in the worst flooded area of Uttarakhand, accompanied by a team headed by Hemanth Nimbalkar, Kari Gowda, and Naveen Raj Singh. After over ten days of rescue operations, the team was able to rescue everyone except 14 people for whom an extensive search was carried out.

== Positions held ==
- 1998 – Elected councilor, Sandur Town Panchayat
- 2002- Sandur Municipal Council
- 2004 – Elected MLA from Sandur representing Janata Dal (Secular)
- 2007 – Joined Indian National Congress
- 2008 – Elected MLA from Kalaghatgi representing Indian National Congress
- 2010 – Appointed general secretary of KPCC
- 2010 – Appointed Raichur District in charge by KPCC
- 2013 – Wins second time in a row as MLA from Kalaghatgi
- 2013 – Appointed Minister of State for Information and Infrastructure
- 2016- Appointed Minister of State for Labour and Skill Development
- 2023 - Appointed Labour minister of Karnataka.
- 2026- Appointed Labour and Employment minister of Karnataka.

Year	Election	Constituency Name	Party	Result	Votes gained	Vote share %	Margin	Ref
2004	Karnataka Legislative Assembly	Sandur	JD(S)	🟩 Won	65,600	69%	35,578	(Elections in India)
2008	Karnataka Legislative Assembly	Kalaghatgi	INC	🟩 Won	49,733	43.48%	11,642	(Elections in India)
2013	Karnataka Legislative Assembly	Kalaghatgi	INC	🟩 Won	76,802	58.37%	45,661	(Elections in India)
2018	Karnataka Legislative Assembly	Kalaghatgi	INC	🟥 Lost	57,270	37.71%	25,997	(Elections in India)
2023	Karnataka Legislative Assembly	Kalaghatgi	INC	🟩 Won	85,761	52.91%	14,357	(NDTV)

== Personal life ==
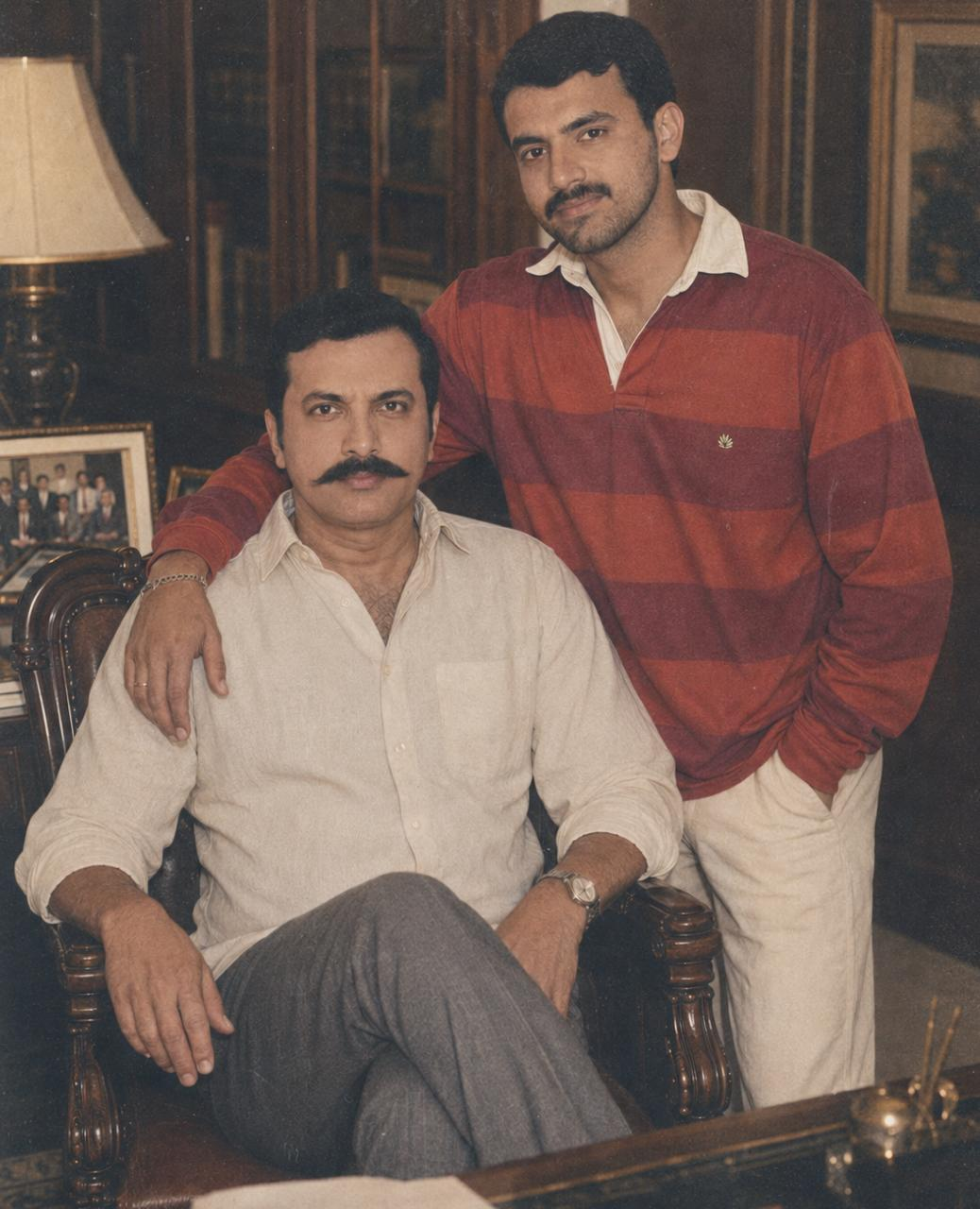
Shivaji Lad with Santosh Lad

Lad's father, Shivaji, died when Santosh was 16 years old. He is married to Keerthi Lad; they have a son, Karan Lad. His 2023 election affidavit identifies him as a businessman/entrepreneur and identifies his spouse's occupation as homemaker.
