= E. Tukaram =

Indian politician

Member of Parliament, Lok Sabha
- Incumbent
- Assumed office 4 June 2024
- Preceded by: Y. Devendrappa
- Constituency: Ballari

Member of the Karnataka Legislative Assembly
- In office 25 May 2008 – 4 June 2024
- Preceded by: Santosh Lad
- Constituency: Sandur

Minister of Medical Education of Karnataka
- In office 22 December 2018 – 8 July 2019
- Preceded by: D. K. Shivakumar
- Succeeded by: C. N. Ashwath Narayan

Personal details
- Born: 26 July 1967 (age 59) Yeswanthanagar, Sandur Taluka, Ballari district, Mysuru State (present–day Karnataka), India
- Party: INC
- Spouse: E. Annapoorna Tukaram
- Education: M.Com, PGDBA (Finance)
- Occupation: Politician

Eregar Tukaram (born 26 July 1967) is an Indian politician from Karnataka. He is an MP of Bellary Lok Sabha constituency and a four time MLA from Sandur Assembly constituency in Ballari District. He was the Minister of Medical Education and Bellary District in-charge minister in the second H D Kumaraswamy ministry.

== Early life and education ==
Tukaram was born in Yeshwantanagar, Bellary district. He completed his M.Com. in 1992 at Nandihalli Masters Centre, Sandur which is affiliated with Gulbarga University College. Later, he also did a PG diploma in Business Administration (Finance) at St.Josephs College of Commerce, Bangalore in 1993.

== Career ==
Tukaram won from Sandur Assembly constituency representing Indian National Congress in the 2023 Karnataka Legislative Assembly election. He polled 85,223 votes and defeated his nearest rival, Shilpa Raghavendra of Bharatiya Janata Party by a huge margin of 35,532 votes.

He was first elected as an MLA after winning the 2008 Karnataka Legislative Assembly election on Indian National Congress ticket from Sandur seat. He retained the seat for Congress in the 2013 Karnataka Legislative Assembly election and won for the third consecutive time winning the 2018 Karnataka Legislative Assembly election. He won for Congress again for a fourth time in the 2023 Karnataka Legislative Assembly election.
