= Yeshwantrao Ghorpade =

- Raja of Sandur
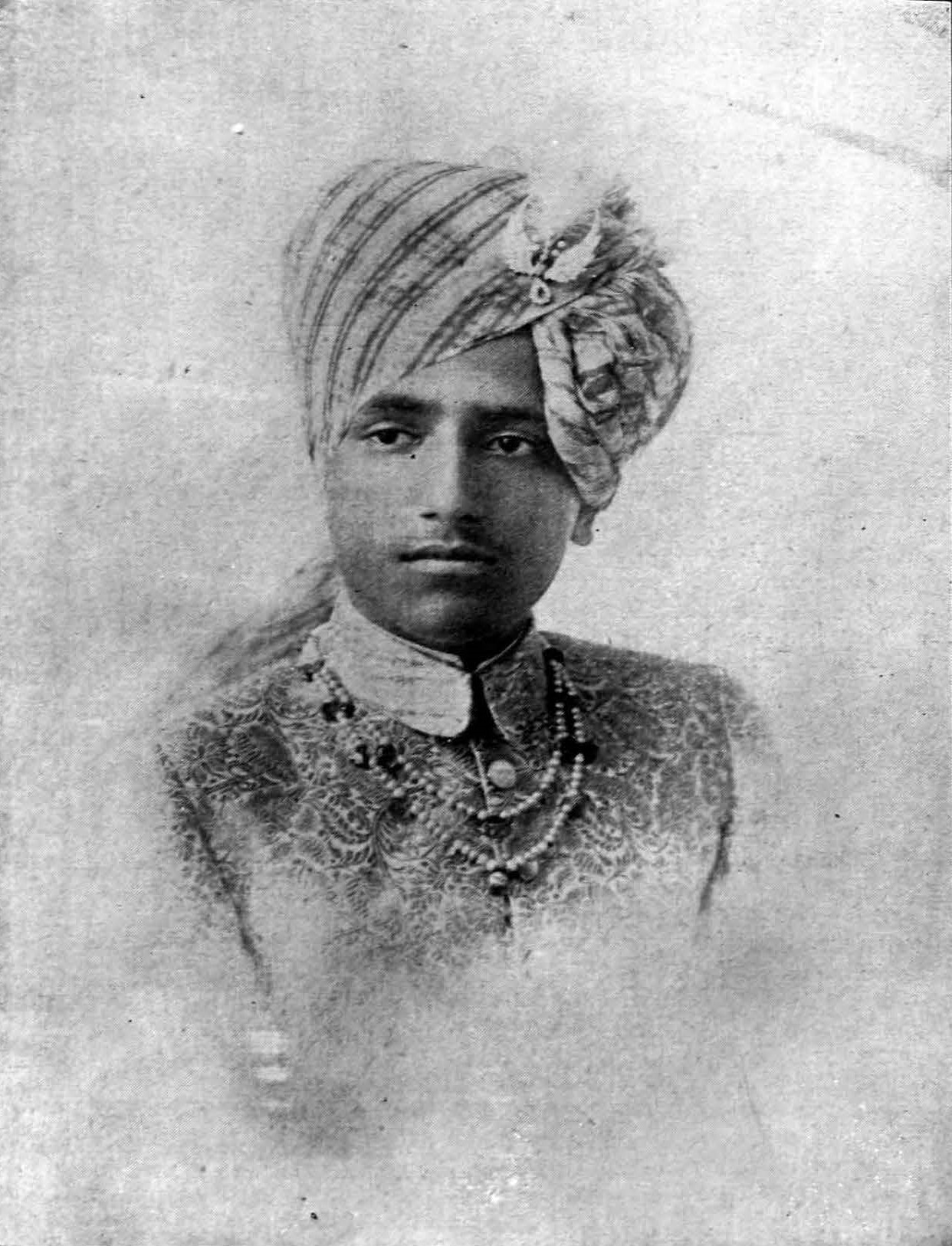
- Yeshwantrao in 1938
- Reign: 5 May 1928 - 1 April 1949
- Coronation: 20 June 1928
- Predecessor: Venkata Rao III
- Successor: Murarirao
- Born: 13 November 1908; Sanduru
- Died: 11 October 1996 (aged 87); Sanduru
Names
- Srimant Raja Yeshwantrao Hindurrao Ghorpade
- House: Ghorpade Dynasty
- Religion: Hinduism

Maharaja Srimant Yeshwantrao Hindurao Ghorpade (13 November 1908 - 11 October 1996) was the ruler of the princely state of Sandur from 1928 to 1949. He was the last Rajah of Sandur and presided over the accession of the state to the Dominion of India. He was also an ardent wildlife conservationist and member of the Bombay Natural History Society.

== Early life and education ==
Yeshwantrao was born on 13 November 1908 in Sanduru, the capital of Sandur state to Bhujangrao Yeshwantrao Raje Ghorpade, the jagirdar of Gajendragad and his wife, Tarabai Sahib Ghorpade. Yeshwantrao had his education at Baldwin High School, Bangalore and Holkar College, Indore and graduated from the Allahabad University. On 5 May 1928, he succeeded his deceased cousin, Venkata Rao III as the Raja of Sandur and was formally installed on 20 June 1928. Murarirao and Shivarao are his sons.

== Reign ==
Yeshwantrao ruled as the Rajah of Sandur till the state's accession to India on 10 August 1947. The state was initially governed by an administrator till 5 February 1930 when he assumed full administrative powers. Yeshwantrao's reign is notable for his social and administrative reforms apart from his efforts at wildlife conservation. Yeshwantrao abolished untouchability and opened the gates of Hindu temples to all castes through legislation in 1932. In 1931, he set up a legislature comprising an upper and a lower house, the Sandur State Council.

The famous writer and wildlife conservationist, Madhavaiah Krishnan was an employee of the Sandur State Civil Service and was instrumental in drawing the Rajah's attention to wildlife conservation. After independence, Ghorpade served as Vice-President of the Expert Committee of Wildlife Conservation in India.

In 1954, Yeshwantrao took over the General Sandur Manganese (GSM), and made it Sandur Manganese and Iron Ore; in 1964 it was listed as a public limited company.

== Honours ==
Yeshwantrao was a recipient of the King George V Silver Jubilee medal (1935), King George VI coronation medal (1937) and the Indian Independence Medal (1948).

Yeshwantrao Ghorpade Ghorpade Dynasty Born: 13 November 1908
Regnal titles
Preceded by Venkata Rao III	Raja of Sandur; 1928–1949	Succeeded by Monarchy abolished
Political offices
Titles in pretence
Preceded by None	— TITULAR — Raja of Sandur; 1949–1996; Reason for succession failure: Monarchy abolished	Succeeded by M. Y. Ghorpade
