= Bandri =

- village
- Location in Karnataka, India Bandri (India)
- Coordinates: 15.07°N 76.55°E
- Country: India
- State: Karnataka
- District: Bellary
- Talukas: Sandur

Government
  - Body: Gram panchayat

Population (2001)
  - Total: 5,772

Languages
  - Official: Kannada
- Time zone: UTC+5:30 (IST)
- ISO 3166 code: IN-KA
- Vehicle registration: KA
- Website: karnataka.gov.in

Bandri is a village in the southern state of Karnataka, India. It is located in the Sandur taluk of Bellary district in Karnataka.

== Demographics ==
As of 2001 India census, Bandri had a population of 5772 with 2928 males and 2844 females.

== See also ==
- Bellary
- Districts of Karnataka
