= Yeswanthanagar =

- village
- Location in Karnataka, India Yeswanthanagar (India)
- Coordinates: 15.07°N 76.55°E
- Country: India
- State: Karnataka
- District: Bellary
- Talukas: Sandur

Government
  - Body: Gram panchayat

Population (2001)
  - Total: 5,157

Languages
  - Official: Kannada
- Time zone: UTC+5:30 (IST)
- ISO 3166 code: IN-KA
- Vehicle registration: KA
- Website: karnataka.gov.in

Yeswanthanagar is a village in the southern state of Karnataka, India. It is located in the Sandur taluk of Bellary district in Karnataka.

== Demographics ==
As of 2001 India census, Yeswanthanagar had a population of 5157 with 2685 males and 2472 females.

The village is growing very fast because of the huge availability of the Iron and Manganese ore.

The places to be seen here are:

1. Gandi Narasimha Swamy Temple: nice location for a day picnic where Narasimha Swamy Temple is a place in the valley of hills and in the banks of Narihalla, which cuts the hill.
2. Sandur polytechnic college is placed here which is very good and famous college for it excellent education.

== See also ==
- Bellary
- Districts of Karnataka
