= M. Y. Ghorpade =

Indian politician and photographer (1931–2011)

Murarirao Yeshwantrao Ghorpade (7 December 1931 – 29 October 2011) was an Indian politician. He was the son of the last Raja of the Sandur State, a former Princely State. He was a former MLA from Sandur and one-time MP from Raichur, Karnataka. He also served as Minister for Rural Development, Panchayat Raj and Finance in the Karnataka State Government. Ghorpade was the Chairman-emeritus of Sandur Manganese and Iron Ore Pvt. Ltd. (SMIORE). He held a Master's Degree in Economics from the University of Cambridge.

Ghorpade was a wildlife photographer famous for his black-and-white photography.

M. Y. Ghorpade Ghorpade Dynasty Born: 7 December 1931
Titles in pretence
Preceded by Yeshwantrao Ghorpade	— TITULAR — Raja of Sandur; 1996–2011; Reason for succession failure: Monarchy abolished	Succeeded by Ajai M. Ghorpade
