= Kalghatgi Assembly constituency =

Legislative Assembly constituency in Karnataka State, India

Coordinates: 15.18°N 74.97°E

Kalghatgi-Alnavar
- Constituency No. 75 for the Karnataka Legislative Assembly

Constituency details
- Country: India
- Region: South India
- State: Karnataka
- District: Dharwad
- Lok Sabha constituency: Dharwad
- Established: 1956
- Total electors: 194,742
- Reservation: None

Member of Legislative Assembly
- 16th Karnataka Legislative Assembly
- Incumbent Santosh Lad
- Party: Indian National Congress
- Elected year: 2023
- Preceded by: C. M. Nimbannavar

Kalghatgi- Alnavar Assembly constituency is one of the 224 Legislative Assembly constituencies of Karnataka in India.

It is part of Dharwad district. As of 2023, it is represented by Santosh Lad of the Indian National Congress party.

== Members of the Legislative Assembly ==
Election	Member	Party
1952	Tambakad Basawannappa Ramappa	Indian National Congress
1957	Tambakad Basawannappa Ramappa	Indian National Congress
1957 By-election (Note: Died in 1957)	B. A. Desai	Independent politician
1962	Fakirappa Muddappa Hasbi	Indian National Congress
1967	P. P. Shivanagouda	Independent politician
1972	P. G. Channappagouda	Indian National Congress
1978	Fakiragouda Shivanagouda Patil	Janata Party
1983	Fathar Jacob Pallipurathu	Independent politician
1985	Siddanagouda Parvatagouda Chanaveeranagouda	Janata Party
1989	Shiddanagoudar Parwat Agouda	Janata Dal
1994	Siddanagouda Parvatagouda Chanaveeranagouda	Janata Dal
1999	Chikkanagoudra Siddanagouda Ishwaragouda	Bharatiya Janata Party
2004	Chikkanagoudra Siddanagouda Ishwaragouda	Bharatiya Janata Party
2008	Santosh Lad	Indian National Congress
2013	Santosh Lad	Indian National Congress
2018	C. M. Nimbannavar	Bharatiya Janata Party
2023	Santosh Lad	Indian National Congress

== Election results ==
=== Assembly Election 2023 ===
2023 Karnataka Legislative Assembly election : Kalghatgi
Party	Candidate	Votes	%	±%
INC	Santosh Lad	85,761	52.86%	▲15.16
BJP	Chabbi Nagaraj	71,404	44.01%	▼10.81
NOTA	None of the above	1,137	0.70%	▼0.25
Margin of victory		14,357	8.85%	▼8.26
Turnout		162,421	83.40%	▲3.27
Total valid votes		162,253		
Registered electors		194,742		▲2.66
INC gain from BJP		Swing	▼1.96	

=== Assembly Election 2018 ===
2018 Karnataka Legislative Assembly election : Kalghatgi
Party	Candidate	Votes	%	±%
BJP	C. M. Nimbannavar	83,267	54.82%	▲49.11
INC	Santosh Lad	57,270	37.70%	▼26.22
Independent	Raju R. Kalaghatagi	4,898	3.22%	New
NOTA	None of the above	1,440	0.95%	New
JD(S)	Ambadagatti Shivanand Rudrappa	1,174	0.77%	▼9.47
Margin of victory		25,997	17.11%	▼20.89
Turnout		152,007	80.13%	▲1.88
Total valid votes		151,902		
Registered electors		189,693		▲12.67
BJP gain from INC		Swing	▼9.10	

=== Assembly Election 2013 ===
2013 Karnataka Legislative Assembly election : Kalghatgi
Party	Candidate	Votes	%	±%
INC	Santosh Lad	76,802	63.92%	▲20.45
KJP	Nimbannavar Channappa Mallappa	31,141	25.92%	New
JD(S)	P. C. Siddanagoudar	12,300	10.24%	▲6.21
BJP	Irappa Channappa Salagar	6,863	5.71%	▼27.59
Independent	Husainasab Mahaboobasab Torgal	1,908	1.59%	New
Independent	Akki Shivappa Yallappa	1,152	0.96%	New
Independent	Basava Prasad Jadhav	818	0.68%	New
Margin of victory		45,661	38.00%	▲27.82
Turnout		131,731	78.25%	▲3.22
Total valid votes		120,150		
Registered electors		168,356		▲10.41
INC hold		Swing	▲20.45	

=== Assembly Election 2008 ===
2008 Karnataka Legislative Assembly election : Kalghatgi
Party	Candidate	Votes	%	±%
INC	Santosh Lad	49,733	43.47%	▲18.52
BJP	Nimbannavar Channappa Mallappa	38,091	33.30%	▲6.39
BSP	Kashimanavar Babusab Kashimasab	14,992	13.10%	▲10.61
JD(S)	Irappa Chanabasappa Gokul	4,613	4.03%	▼5.65
Independent	G. Basavaraj	2,118	1.85%	New
Rashtriya Hindustan Sena Karnataka	Irappa Kallappa Koti	1,240	1.08%	New
SP	Irappa Channappa Salagar	1,147	1.00%	New
Independent	Dodamani Bhimappa Irabasappa	739	0.65%	New
Margin of victory		11,642	10.18%	▲8.30
Turnout		114,416	75.03%	▼0.83
Total valid votes		114,403		
Registered electors		152,486		▲10.93
INC gain from BJP		Swing	▲16.56	

=== Assembly Election 2004 ===
2004 Karnataka Legislative Assembly election : Kalghatgi
Party	Candidate	Votes	%	±%
BJP	Chikkanagoudra Siddanagouda Ishwaragouda	28,065	26.91%	▼9.17
JP	Babusab K. Kashimanavar	26,107	25.04%	New
INC	Siddanagouda Parvatagouda Chanaveeranagouda	26,016	24.95%	▼4.60
JD(S)	Keshav M. Yadav	10,096	9.68%	▲7.89
Independent	Vishwaprakash Rajashekhariah Ullagaddimath	6,880	6.60%	New
BSP	Parashuram D. Koddaddi	2,592	2.49%	New
Independent	Swamy Shivanand. H	1,693	1.62%	New
Kannada Nadu Party	Dr. Dambal. Y. B	1,416	1.36%	New
Sirpanch Samaj Party	Renuka Bhimappa Maraditota	1,415	1.36%	New
Margin of victory		1,958	1.88%	▼2.18
Turnout		104,280	75.86%	▼1.86
Total valid votes		104,280		
Registered electors		137,457		▲10.99
BJP hold		Swing	▼9.17	

=== Assembly Election 1999 ===
1999 Karnataka Legislative Assembly election : Kalghatgi
Party	Candidate	Votes	%	±%
BJP	Chikkanagoudra Siddanagouda Ishwaragouda	32,977	36.08%	▲19.23
Independent	Kashimanavar Babusab Kashimasab	29,265	32.02%	New
INC	Siddanagouda Parvatagouda Chanaveeranagouda	27,006	29.55%	▲24.19
JD(S)	Deepa Dayanand Murakumbi	1,632	1.79%	New
Margin of victory		3,712	4.06%	▼8.36
Turnout		96,252	77.72%	▲1.67
Total valid votes		91,405		
Rejected ballots		4,847	5.04%	▲2.48
Registered electors		123,841		▲6.81
BJP gain from JD		Swing	▲6.52	

=== Assembly Election 1994 ===
1994 Karnataka Legislative Assembly election : Kalghatgi
Party	Candidate	Votes	%	±%
JD	Siddanagouda Parvatagouda Chanaveeranagouda	25,392	29.56%	▲2.19
KRRS	Khesnarao Marutirao Yadav	14,718	17.13%	New
BJP	Shiddanagouda Chikkanagoudra Chanaveeragouda Bharamagoudra	14,473	16.85%	New
Independent	Kashimanavar Babusab Kashimasab	11,189	13.02%	New
INC	Nimbannavar Channappa Mallappa	6,755	7.86%	New
INC	Buniyan Monorama. V	4,604	5.36%	▼15.04
Independent	Basavaraj Chandrashekear Patil	3,993	4.65%	New
Independent	Tadasamath Veerayya Fakkirayya	2,910	3.39%	New
Independent	Neelavv Basappa Talikoti	861	1.00%	New
Margin of victory		10,674	12.42%	▲11.41
Turnout		88,177	76.05%	▲2.73
Total valid votes		85,913		
Rejected ballots		2,255	2.56%	▼6.39
Registered electors		115,944		▲9.13
JD hold		Swing	▲2.19	

=== Assembly Election 1989 ===
1989 Karnataka Legislative Assembly election : Kalghatgi
Party	Candidate	Votes	%	±%
JD	Shiddanagoudar Parwat Agouda	19,417	27.37%	New
Kranti Sabha	Kelageri Mahadevappa Sangappa	18,700	26.36%	New
INC	Manorama Victor Buniyan	14,467	20.40%	▼20.30
Independent	Jakob. P. J	10,896	15.36%	New
Independent	Yadava Keshavarao Marutirao	2,170	3.06%	New
CPI	Guruppanavar Veerappa Basavantappa	2,007	2.83%	New
JP	Nesragi Shankaraling Basavanneppa	1,750	2.47%	New
Independent	Kampli Kuravatteppa Chanabasappa	457	0.64%	New
Margin of victory		717	1.01%	▼14.82
Turnout		77,904	73.32%	▼2.14
Total valid votes		70,931		
Rejected ballots		6,973	8.95%	▲6.47
Registered electors		106,247		▲29.20
JD gain from JP		Swing	▼29.16	

=== Assembly Election 1985 ===
1985 Karnataka Legislative Assembly election : Kalghatgi
Party	Candidate	Votes	%	±%
JP	Siddanagouda Parvatagouda Chanaveeranagouda	34,211	56.53%	New
INC	Gurushantagouda Chennappagouda Patil	24,631	40.70%	▼4.88
Independent	Bidaralli Gopal Nagappa	1,018	1.68%	New
Independent	Narapanahali Shivamurti Ninigappa	417	0.69%	New
Margin of victory		9,580	15.83%	▲14.85
Turnout		62,054	75.46%	▲4.47
Total valid votes		60,513		
Rejected ballots		1,541	2.48%	▼0.52
Registered electors		82,237		▲11.42
JP gain from Independent		Swing	▲9.97	

=== Assembly Election 1983 ===
1983 Karnataka Legislative Assembly election : Kalghatgi
Party	Candidate	Votes	%	±%
Independent	Fathar Jacob Pallipurathu	23,664	46.56%	New
INC	Fakiragouda Shivanagouda Patil	23,168	45.58%	▲32.80
Independent	Mathad Shantakka Basabantayya	3,037	5.98%	New
Independent	Pujar Gangadharayya Vasavannayya	423	0.83%	New
Margin of victory		496	0.98%	▼11.42
Turnout		52,397	70.99%	▼1.03
Total valid votes		50,827		
Rejected ballots		1,570	3.00%	▼0.79
Registered electors		73,806		▲4.77
Independent gain from JP		Swing	▼2.18	

=== Assembly Election 1978 ===
1978 Karnataka Legislative Assembly election : Kalghatgi
Party	Candidate	Votes	%	±%
JP	Fakiragouda Shivanagouda Patil	23,789	48.74%	New
INC(I)	Kurawatti Chana - Basappa Basappa	17,736	36.34%	New
INC	Gurushantagouda Chennappagouda Patil	6,237	12.78%	▼39.16
Independent	Khanagouda Parwathagaude Khanagouda	1,049	2.15%	New
Margin of victory		6,053	12.40%	▲5.60
Turnout		50,732	72.02%	▲4.44
Total valid votes		48,811		
Rejected ballots		1,921	3.79%	▲3.79
Registered electors		70,446		▲27.40
JP gain from INC		Swing	▼3.20	

=== Assembly Election 1972 ===
1972 Mysore State Legislative Assembly election : Kalghatgi
Party	Candidate	Votes	%	±%
INC	P. G. Channappagouda	18,708	51.94%	▲14.33
INC(O)	Fakiragouda Shivanagouda Patil	16,259	45.14%	New
Independent	M. A. Mallappa	1,054	2.93%	New
Margin of victory		2,449	6.80%	▼17.98
Turnout		37,371	67.58%	▼4.14
Total valid votes		36,021		
Registered electors		55,295		▲13.08
INC gain from Independent		Swing	▼10.45	

=== Assembly Election 1967 ===
1967 Mysore State Legislative Assembly election : Kalghatgi
Party	Candidate	Votes	%	±%
Independent	P. P. Shivanagouda	20,188	62.39%	New
INC	P. A. Shiddanagouda	12,170	37.61%	▼8.34
Margin of victory		8,018	24.78%	▲18.82
Turnout		35,071	71.72%	▲12.49
Total valid votes		32,358		
Registered electors		48,900		▼12.77
Independent gain from INC		Swing	▲16.44	

=== Assembly Election 1962 ===
1962 Mysore State Legislative Assembly election : Kalghatgi
Party	Candidate	Votes	%	±%
INC	Fakirappa Muddappa Hasbi	13,842	45.95%	▲7.09
Lok Sewak Sangh	Basavraj Appayya Desai	12,047	39.99%	New
Socialist Party (India)	N. B. Pujar	3,431	11.39%	New
ABJS	Yeshavantrao Bacharam Shindhe	803	2.67%	New
Margin of victory		1,795	5.96%	▼16.32
Turnout		33,202	59.23%	
Total valid votes		30,123		
Registered electors		56,060		
INC gain from Independent		Swing	▼15.19	

=== Assembly By-election 1957 ===
1957 Mysore State Legislative Assembly by-election : Kalghatgi
Party	Candidate	Votes	%	±%
Independent	B. A. Desai	17,865	61.14%	New
INC	A. V. Kowdi	11,354	38.86%	▼45.78
Margin of victory		6,511	22.28%	▼53.15
Total valid votes		29,219		
Independent gain from INC		Swing	▼23.50	

=== Assembly Election 1957 ===
1957 Mysore State Legislative Assembly election : Kalghatgi
Party	Candidate	Votes	%	±%
INC	Tambakad Basawannappa Ramappa	16,928	84.64%	▲27.56
Independent	Yavagal Virappa Murusavirappa	1,842	9.21%	New
Independent	Kambar Siddappa Mallappa	1,229	6.15%	New
Margin of victory		15,086	75.43%	▲47.49
Turnout		19,999	39.03%	▼16.80
Total valid votes		19,999		
Registered electors		51,242		▲8.78
INC hold		Swing	▲27.56	

=== Assembly Election 1952 ===
1952 Bombay State Legislative Assembly election : Dharwar Kalghatgi
Party	Candidate	Votes	%	±%
INC	Tambakad Basawannappa Ramappa	15,010	57.08%	New
KMPP	Patil Basanagauda Chanabasanagauda	7,663	29.14%	New
SP	Sogi Basappa Gurappa	3,625	13.78%	New
Margin of victory		7,347	27.94%	
Turnout		26,298	55.83%	
Total valid votes		26,298		
Registered electors		47,104		
INC win (new seat)				

== See also ==
- List of constituencies of the Karnataka Legislative Assembly
- Dharwad district
