= Ubbalagandi =

Coordinates: 15°03′N 76°39′E

- village
- Interactive map of Ubbalagandi
- Country: India
- State: Karnataka
- District: Bellary

Government
  - Body: Gram Panchayat Rajapura

Languages
  - Official: Kannada
- Time zone: UTC+5:30 (IST)
- Vehicle registration: KA-
- Coastline: 0 kilometres (0 mi)

Ubbalagandi is a village in Sanduru taluk, Bellary district, Karnataka, India, located around 65 km (40 mi) from Bellary and Hospet. The village is known for a rich forest and Switzerland of Bellary. Veerabhadreshwara temple is located between two pillars (rocks locally called as vadeu). There is a waterfall (springs from Donimalai) near the temple. This is compared to Yana. Donimalai and Byreveshwara temples are also located nearby. The nearest town is Sanduru.

Ugadi is celebrated with Veerabhadhra Rathothsava (Chariot) and is known for its history. The place is rich with iron ore mines. Ugadi is celebrated every year with a newly built Chariot for Sri Veerabhadreswar (Powerful Ganadishwar of Shiva).

Weather is different from Bellary with moderate, comfortable temperatures and with light to moderate winds. Land is fertile but nowadays most of the livelihood is from mining of iron ore.

The village's natural environment was captured in a Kannada movie Manasa Sarovar acted by Srinath.

Shree Verabhadreshwara Seva Kendra Trust is formed and registered to improve the area related to temple facilities, education, health...etc
