= Sandur Assembly constituency =

Legislative Assembly constituency in Karnataka State, India

Coordinates: 15.09°N 76.55°E

Sandur
- Constituency No. 95 for the Karnataka Legislative Assembly

Constituency details
- Country: India
- Region: South India
- State: Karnataka
- District: Ballari
- Lok Sabha constituency: Bellary
- Established: 1956
- Total electors: 223,337
- Reservation: ST

Member of Legislative Assembly
- 16th Karnataka Legislative Assembly
- Incumbent E. Annapoorna Tukaram
- Party: Indian National Congress
- Elected year: 2024
- Preceded by: Santosh Lad

Sandur Assembly constituency is one of the 224 Legislative Assembly constituencies of Karnataka in India.

It is part of Ballari district and is reserved for candidates belonging to the Scheduled Tribes.

== Members of the Legislative Assembly ==
Election	Member	Party
1957	H. Rayana Gouda	Indian National Congress
1959 By-election (Note: Died in 1959)	M. Y. Ghorpade	Indian National Congress
1962	M. Y. Ghorpade	Indian National Congress
1967	M. Y. Ghorpade	Indian National Congress
1972	M. Y. Ghorpade	Indian National Congress
1978	C. Rudrappa	Indian National Congress
1983	Heeroji. V. S. Lad	Indian National Congress
1985	U. Bhupathi	Janata Party
1989	M. Y. Ghorpade	Indian National Congress
1994	M. Y. Ghorpade	Indian National Congress
1999	M. Y. Ghorpade	Indian National Congress
2004	Santosh Lad	Janata Dal
2008	E. Tukaram	Indian National Congress
2013	E. Tukaram	Indian National Congress
2018	E. Tukaram	Indian National Congress
2023	E. Tukaram	Indian National Congress
2024 By-election (Note: Elected to Lok Sabha on 4 June 2024)	E. Annapoorna Tukaram	Indian National Congress

== Election results ==
=== Assembly By-election 2024 ===
2024 Karnataka Legislative Assembly by-election : Sandur
Party	Candidate	Votes	%	±%
INC	E. Annapoorna Tukaram	93,616	52.25	▲2.94
BJP	Bangara Hanumantha	83,967	46.87	▲18.11
NOTA	None of the above	1,040	0.58	▼0.04
Margin of victory		9,649	5.39	▼15.16
Turnout		180,189	76.22	▼1.26
Total valid votes		179,165		
Registered electors		236,402		▲5.85
INC hold		Swing	▲2.94	

=== Assembly Election 2023 ===
2023 Karnataka Legislative Assembly election : Sandur
Party	Candidate	Votes	%	±%
INC	E. Tukaram	85,223	49.31	▼0.22
BJP	Shilpa Raghavendra	49,701	28.76	▼11.88
KRPP	K. S. Divakar	31,375	18.15	New
JD(S)	N. Somappa	2,617	1.51	▼1.24
NOTA	None of the above	1,065	0.62	▼0.52
Margin of victory		35,522	20.55	▲11.67
Turnout		173,039	77.48	▲2.86
Total valid votes		172,833		
Registered electors		223,337		▲5.59
INC hold		Swing	▼0.22	

=== Assembly Election 2018 ===
2018 Karnataka Legislative Assembly election : Sandur
Party	Candidate	Votes	%	±%
INC	E. Tukaram	78,106	49.53	▲2.71
BJP	D. Raghavendra (Manju)	64,096	40.64	▲38.15
Independent	Bangara Hanumantha	7,191	4.56	New
JD(S)	B. Vasanth Kumar	4,343	2.75	▼18.02
NOTA	None of the above	1,803	1.14	New
SUCI(C)	A. Ramanjanappa	1,243	0.79	New
Margin of victory		14,010	8.88	▼17.17
Turnout		157,815	74.62	▼0.13
Total valid votes		157,710		
Registered electors		211,504		▲23.07
INC hold		Swing	▲2.71	

=== Assembly Election 2013 ===
2013 Karnataka Legislative Assembly election : Sandur
Party	Candidate	Votes	%	±%
INC	E. Tukaram	62,246	46.82	▲0.19
JD(S)	Dhananjaya. R	27,615	20.77	▲5.53
BSRCP	Chinnabasappa. G	23,359	17.57	New
KJP	B. Raviprakash	4,355	3.28	New
BJP	Marenna. E	3,314	2.49	▼24.63
CPI	Hanumantappa	2,699	2.03	New
Independent	P. Pandurangaiah	1,935	1.46	New
Independent	Shivarama Bhimappa	1,911	1.44	New
Independent	G. Veeranagouda	950	0.71	New
Margin of victory		34,631	26.05	▲6.55
Turnout		128,453	74.75	▼2.05
Total valid votes		132,941		
Registered electors		171,854		▲24.23
INC hold		Swing	▲0.19	

=== Assembly Election 2008 ===
2008 Karnataka Legislative Assembly election : Sandur
Party	Candidate	Votes	%	±%
INC	E. Tukaram	49,535	46.63	▲20.90
BJP	T. Nagaraj	28,816	27.12	▲19.89
JD(S)	Basavaraj. T	16,195	15.24	▼40.92
BSP	B. Jayanna	6,019	5.67	▲4.75
Independent	N. Venkanna	3,702	3.48	New
Independent	Venkatesha	1,968	1.85	New
Margin of victory		20,719	19.50	▼10.93
Turnout		106,247	76.80	▲3.08
Total valid votes		106,235		
Registered electors		138,339		▼12.74
INC gain from JD(S)		Swing	▼9.53	

=== Assembly Election 2004 ===
2004 Karnataka Legislative Assembly election : Sandur
Party	Candidate	Votes	%	±%
JD(S)	Santosh Lad	65,600	56.16	▲53.98
INC	Venkatarao Ghorpade	30,056	25.73	▼27.32
BJP	Prathiba Kotrappa. T	8,448	7.23	New
Independent	Kanthikeya Ghorpade	4,475	3.83	New
JP	Shekar Babu. B	1,881	1.61	New
Kannada Nadu Party	Raghavendra. G	1,513	1.30	New
Independent	Jilan Sab. N	1,503	1.29	New
Independent	Rajashekar Goud. B	1,448	1.24	New
BSP	Basappa Nayaka. V. K	1,080	0.92	▼0.80
Margin of victory		35,544	30.43	▲20.42
Turnout		116,875	73.72	▲3.13
Total valid votes		116,811		
Registered electors		158,530		▲15.63
JD(S) gain from INC		Swing	▲3.11	

=== Assembly Election 1999 ===
1999 Karnataka Legislative Assembly election : Sandur
Party	Candidate	Votes	%	±%
INC	M. Y. Ghorpade	47,681	53.05	▼0.19
JD(U)	Heeroji Lad	38,688	43.05	New
JD(S)	Kurubara Pompanna	1,961	2.18	New
BSP	G. M. Raghunath	1,547	1.72	New
Margin of victory		8,993	10.01	▼23.12
Turnout		96,775	70.59	▲6.48
Total valid votes		89,877		
Rejected ballots		6,865	7.09	▲2.94
Registered electors		137,099		▲14.47
INC hold		Swing	▼0.19	

=== Assembly Election 1994 ===
1994 Karnataka Legislative Assembly election : Sandur
Party	Candidate	Votes	%	±%
INC	M. Y. Ghorpade	39,176	53.24	▼4.95
INC	Sudhakar Hiremath	14,797	20.11	New
JD	U. Bhupathi	12,946	17.59	▼20.23
BJP	Gopinath Rao	5,040	6.85	New
Independent	Maresha	1,341	1.82	New
Margin of victory		24,379	33.13	▲12.76
Turnout		76,777	64.11	▼3.43
Total valid votes		73,588		
Rejected ballots		3,189	4.15	▼2.43
Registered electors		119,766		▲3.52
INC hold		Swing	▼4.95	

=== Assembly Election 1989 ===
1989 Karnataka Legislative Assembly election : Sandur
Party	Candidate	Votes	%	±%
INC	M. Y. Ghorpade	42,475	58.19	▲23.28
JD	Ayyalu Thimmappa	27,605	37.82	New
JP	J. M. Vrushabhendraiah	1,850	2.53	New
Independent	B. Dharna Naik	523	0.72	New
Margin of victory		14,870	20.37	▼0.88
Turnout		78,135	67.54	▲13.12
Total valid votes		72,993		
Rejected ballots		5,142	6.58	▲4.14
Registered electors		115,694		▲28.96
INC gain from JP		Swing	▲2.03	

=== Assembly Election 1985 ===
1985 Karnataka Legislative Assembly election : Sandur
Party	Candidate	Votes	%	±%
JP	U. Bhupathi	26,748	56.16	New
INC	K. S. Veerabhadrappa	16,628	34.91	▼28.76
BJP	A. Prakash	3,093	6.49	New
Independent	K. Basavaraj	766	1.61	New
Independent	Revadi Kumaraswamy Setty	396	0.83	New
Margin of victory		10,120	21.25	▼6.08
Turnout		48,821	54.42	▼5.32
Total valid votes		47,631		
Rejected ballots		1,190	2.44	▼1.83
Registered electors		89,716		▲7.12
JP gain from INC		Swing	▼7.51	

=== Assembly Election 1983 ===
1983 Karnataka Legislative Assembly election : Sandur
Party	Candidate	Votes	%	±%
INC	Heeroji. V. S. Lad	30,496	63.67	▲56.44
CPI	Aravind Malebennur	17,404	36.33	New
Margin of victory		13,092	27.33	▼4.35
Turnout		50,035	59.74	▼6.70
Total valid votes		47,900		
Rejected ballots		2,135	4.27	▼0.62
Registered electors		83,755		▲5.53
INC gain from INC(I)		Swing	▲1.45	

=== Assembly Election 1978 ===
1978 Karnataka Legislative Assembly election : Sandur
Party	Candidate	Votes	%	±%
INC(I)	C. Rudrappa	31,206	62.22	New
JP	Y. Thimmappa	15,318	30.54	New
INC	Heeroji	3,628	7.23	▼53.20
Margin of victory		15,888	31.68	▲9.81
Turnout		52,728	66.44	▲0.14
Total valid votes		50,152		
Rejected ballots		2,576	4.89	▲4.89
Registered electors		79,364		▲17.22
INC(I) gain from INC		Swing	▲1.79	

=== Assembly Election 1972 ===
1972 Mysore State Legislative Assembly election : Sandur
Party	Candidate	Votes	%	±%
INC	M. Y. Ghorpade	26,030	60.43	New
INC(O)	Yali Thimmappa	16,608	38.56	New
Independent	Maleppa	436	1.01	New
Margin of victory		9,422	21.87	
Turnout		44,889	66.30	
Total valid votes		43,074		
Registered electors		67,707		
INC hold		Swing		

=== Assembly Election 1967 ===
1967 Mysore State Legislative Assembly election : Sandur
Party	Candidate	Votes	%	±%
INC	M. Y. Ghorpade	Unopposed		
Registered electors		56,684		▼9.58
INC hold		Swing		

=== Assembly Election 1962 ===
1962 Mysore State Legislative Assembly election : Sandur
Party	Candidate	Votes	%	±%
INC	M. Y. Ghorpade	23,893	81.40	▲7.93
SWA	Hanumantappa	4,118	14.03	New
PSP	Thimmapa	1,343	4.58	New
Margin of victory		19,775	67.37	▲17.81
Turnout		31,651	50.49	
Total valid votes		29,354		
Registered electors		62,687		
INC hold		Swing	▲7.93	

=== Assembly By-election 1959 ===
1959 Mysore State Legislative Assembly by-election : Sandur
Party	Candidate	Votes	%	±%
INC	M. Y. Ghorpade	22,334	73.47	▲22.89
Independent	H. M. Veerabhadraiah	7,269	23.91	New
Independent	M. G. M. Gowd	618	2.03	New
Margin of victory		15,065	49.56	▲35.59
Total valid votes		30,399		
INC hold		Swing	▲22.89	

=== Assembly Election 1957 ===
1957 Mysore State Legislative Assembly election : Sandur
Party	Candidate	Votes	%	±%
INC	H. Rayana Gouda	13,955	50.58	New
Independent	K. R. Shadakshari Goud	10,101	36.61	New
Independent	K. Husain Peera Sab	3,536	12.82	New
Margin of victory		3,854	13.97	
Turnout		27,592	50.82	
Total valid votes		27,592		
Registered electors		54,292		
INC win (new seat)				

== See also ==
- List of constituencies of the Karnataka Legislative Assembly
- Ballari district
