= E. Annapoorna Tukaram =

Indian politician

Member of the Karnataka Legislative Assembly
- Incumbent
- Assumed office 23 November 2024
- Preceded by: E. Tukaram
- Constituency: Sandur

Personal details
- Born: 1970 (age 55–56) Karnataka, India
- Party: Indian National Congress
- Spouse: E. Tukaram
- Occupation: Politician

Eregar Annapoorna Tukaram is an Indian politician. She was elected to the Karnataka Legislative Assembly from Sandur in the 2024 by-poll as a member of the Indian National Congress.

The by-poll for the Sandur seat was necessitated following the election of E Tukaram of Congress to Lok Sabha in May 2024 elections. The by-election was held on 13 November, E. Annapoorna winning the Assembly bypoll by a margin of 9,649 votes. Annapoorna secured 93,616 votes, while her opponent Hanumanthu got 83,967 votes.

Annapurna had completed her graduation in Arts in 2014 from Kuvempu University, Shivamogga. She belongs to the Scheduled Tribe (ST) Valmiki Nayak community.
