= K. V. Ghorpade =

Indian pathologist (born 1919)

- Born: 17 March 1919; India
- Died: 23 December 1997 (aged 78)
- Education: Victoria Hospital
- Scientific career
- Fields: Pathology
- Workplaces: Kidwai Memorial Cancer Hospital

Krishna Rao Voomaji Rao Ghorpade, better known as K. V. Ghorpade (17 March 1919 – 23 December 1997) was an Indian pathologist.

He was born on 17 March 1919. After medical education, he worked under Dr. P. Krishna Rao and obtained Ph.D. from Victoria Hospital.

He worked on the toxicity of Abrus precatorius on the maternal and fetal tissues, Kyasanur forest disease and South Indian Paraplegia.

He held many administrative jobs as member of various University boards, Vice Dean of K.M.C., Hubli and Dean of Kidwai Memorian Cancer Hospital, Bangalore.

He established the Pathology laboratories in Victoria Hospital, M. S. Ramaiah Medical College and St. Martha's Hospital.

== Bibliography ==
- K. V. Ghorpade : Comparison of two commercial Meinicke Antigens, Report on the use of three different qualities of saline in the preparation of each antigen for serological testing. Bulletin of the World Health Organization, 1952, 5: 513–16.
- Weinbren, K.; Ghorpade, K. V. (1960). "The Effect of Bile Duct Ligation on Latent Irradiation Effects in the Rat Liver". British Journal of Radiology. 33 (391): 426–429. doi:10.1259/0007-1285-33-391-426. PMID 13843563.
- Weinbren, K.; Ghorpade, K. V. (1962). "The Enhancement of Ductal Proliferation by Deprivation of the Portal Blood Supply in the Rat Liver". Cancer Research. 22: 881–884. PMID 14005702.
- Ghorpade, K. V.; Hirinaiah, H. (1975). "Lymphangiectatic fibrous polyp of tonsil". Indian Journal of Otolaryngology and Head & Neck Surgery. 27 (3): 160–163. doi:10.1007/BF03047858.
