= Sandur State =

Princely state of India during the British Raj, 1713–1949

Coordinates: 15.1°N 76.55°E

- Princely State
- 1713–1949
- Flag

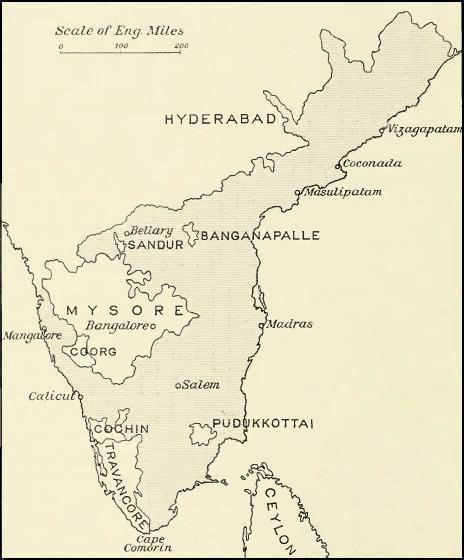
- 1913 map of the Madras Presidency
- Area
  - 1901: 433 km^{2} (167 sq mi)
- Population
  - 1901: 11,200
- History
  - Established: 1713
  - Indian independence: 1949
Preceded by	Succeeded by
Maratha Empire	India
- Today part of: Karnataka, India

Sandur State was a Maratha princely state of India during the British Raj, part of the Madras States Agency. Its capital was the town of Sanduru.

== History ==
From 1731 until the accession to India, the Sandur state was ruled by Maratha royals. In 1776 – 1790 its territory was annexed to the Mysore Kingdom. Between 27 October 1817 and 1 July 1818 Sandur was annexed to the Marathas's Dominions. In 1801, Bellary district was transferred to British India, and the Rajas of Sandur came under the political authority of the Madras Presidency. On 1 July 1818 Sandur formally became a British protectorate.

The area of the state was 433 km^{2}. (161 sq. mi.); its population in 1901 was 11,200. The military sanatorium of Ramandurg is located in a range of hills on the western border of the district.

The Raja of Sandur acceded to the Union of India on 10 August 1947. The ruler commanded an estimated annual revenue of Rs.3,500/-. Sandur remained a separate territorial entity till 1 April 1949 when it was merged with the neighbouring Bellary district of Madras State (the previous directly ruled colonial Madras Province).

Sandur state was later incorporated into Bellary district, then part of the Madras Presidency. In 1953, Bellary District was transferred to Mysore State, which was later renamed Karnataka.

The instrument of accession to the Dominion of India was signed by Yeshwantrao Ghorpade on 10 August 1947, thereby merging Sandur State with the Madras Presidency in 1949. After formation of states on linguistic basis, Sandur was transferred to the Mysore State in 1956. Raja Yeshwantrao continued playing an influential and active role in public life, till his death in 1996. He was succeeded by is son, M. Y. Ghorpade as the titular Raja. M. Y. Ghorpade served as a state Minister for Finance, Rural Development & Panchayats, Member of the Karnataka Legislative Assembly and Member of Parliament the Indian Parliament (Lok Shabha).

== Royal insignia ==
=== Arms ===
A fess, argent, thereon a "ghorpad" (monitor lizard) fesswise, proper; in the base, pink, a cannon, proper; in the chief, pink, a "Shiv Linga" vert, between two tower or. Helmet: with visor, all or. Crest: A "Chhatra" (parasol) on a wreath, all or. Supporters: Elephants with raised trunks, dexter, the rear left foot, and sinister, the front feet on the compartment, all proper. Motto: "Hindurao" in Marathi, azure on a pink riband. Compartment: Vines and creepers proper. Lambrequins: Argent and azure.

=== Royal standard ===
Rectangular 4x7, swallow-tailed, saffron in colour, with a white strip at the hoist. Near the hoist, in the centre - a golden sun in splendour of saffron rays having a "Ghoo" in centre with natural colouring, under a saffron "Chhatra" of having bistre spots.

== Royal Titulature ==
Role	Royal Title
The Ruling Prince	Shrimant Maharaj Shri (personal name) (alias) (father's name) Ghorpade, Hindurao, Mamlukatmadar Senapati, Raja of Sandur
The Consort of the Ruling Prince	Shrimant Akhand Soubhagyavati Rani (personal name) Ghorpade, Rani Sahib of Sandur
The Heir Apparent	Yuvraj Shrimant Shri (personal name) (alias) (father's name) Ghorpade, Yuvraj Sahib of Sandur
The sons of the ruling prince	Rajkumar Shrimant (personal name) (alias) (father's name) Raje Sahib Ghorpade
The unmarried daughters of the ruling prince	Rajkumari Shrimant (personal name) Raje Sahib Ghorpade
The married daughters of the ruling prince	Shrimant Akhand Soubhagyavati (personal name) Raje (husband's family name)

== Rulers ==
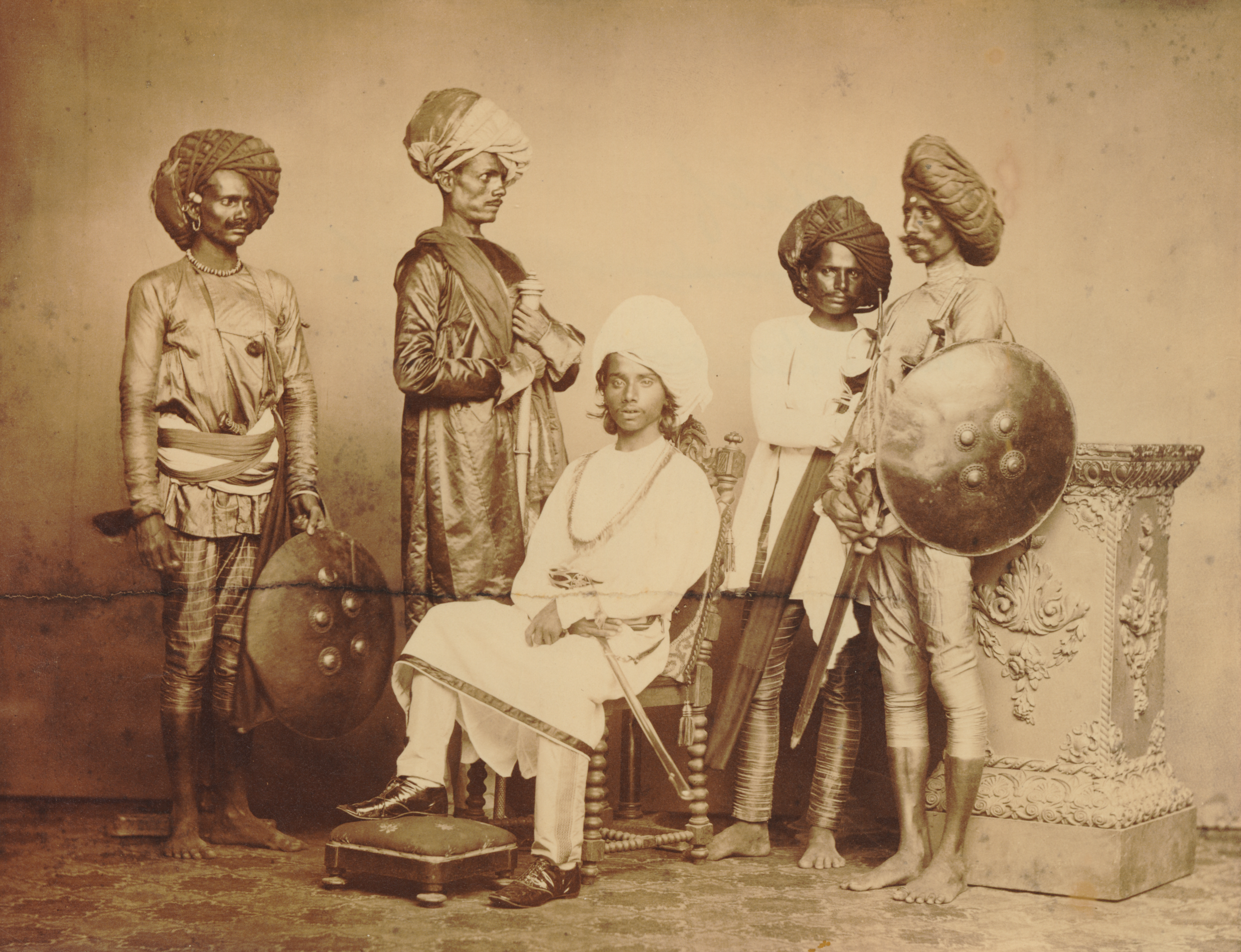
Prince of Sandur with attendants. c. 1880

The male line has failed several times, necessitating adoptions from junior branches of the family. The right to adopt an heir and successor was confirmed by a British sanad of adoption in 1862.

- 1713 – 1731 Sidhoji Rao I (b. c.1683 – d. 1731)
- 1731 – 15 March 1776 Murari Rao (b. c.1699 – d. 1779)
- 1790 – 1796 Sidhoji Rao II (b. 1783 – d. 1796)
- 1796 – 27 Oct 1817 Shiva Rao II (1st time) (d. 1840; cfr. below)
- 27 Oct 1817 – 1 July 1818 annexed to the Maratha Peshwa's Dominions
- 1 July 1818 – 2 May 1840 Shiva Rao II (2nd time) (s.a.)
- 2 May 1840 – 1861 Venkata Rao II
- 1861 – 1878 Shivashanmukha Rao
- 3 May 1878 – 3 Dec 1892 Ramachandra Vitthala Rao
- 3 Dec 1892 – 24 Jul 1927 Venkata Rao III
- 5 May 1928 – 15 Aug 1947 Yeshwantrao Ghorpade

== Diwans ==
- J. G. Firth (1885-1897)
- T. Kodandarama Nayudu (1897-1914)
- A. Subbaraya Mudaliar
- T. Ramachandra Iyer

== See also ==
- Maratha
- Maratha Empire
- List of Maratha dynasties and states
- List of Indian princely states

== External links and sources ==
- Media related to Sandur State at Wikimedia Commons
- Indian Princely States, as archived on www.uq.net.au - Genealogy of Sandur princely state
