= Ghorpade =

Ghorpade is a surname and family name found among Marathas, Marathi Brahmins, Mahar and even Chambhar caste in the Indian states of Maharashtra and Karnataka.

== Notable people ==
- Santaji Ghorpade (1645–1696), Maratha warrior, chief general of Rajaram Maharaj
- Yeshwantrao Ghorpade (1908–1996), last raja of Sandur
- M. Y. Ghorpade (1931–2011), politician from Karnataka
- Jayasinghrao Ghorpade, Indian cricketer
- Sujay Ghorpade (born 1965), Indian table tennis player
- K. V. Ghorpade (1919–1997), Indian pathologist

== Sources ==
=== Marathi ===
- Balagi Nathugi Gavand; Govind Moroba Karlekar (1997). Kshytriya Marathyanchi Vanshavali and Shannavkuli aani Surya, Som, Bhramh and Sheshvant. Tukaram book Depo, Madhavbag, Mumbai 4.
