= Sanduru =

- Town
- Location in Karnataka, India
- Coordinates: 15.1°N 76.55°E
- Country: India
- State: Karnataka
- District: Ballari

Government
  - Body: Town Municipal Council

Area
  - Town: 22.13 km^{2} (8.54 sq mi)
  - Rural: 1,234.35 km^{2} (476.59 sq mi)
- Elevation: 564 m (1,850 ft)

Population (2011)
  - Town: 37,431
  - Density: 1,691/km^{2} (4,381/sq mi)
  - Rural: 222,782

Languages
  - Official: Kannada
- Time zone: UTC+5:30 (IST)
- PIN: 583 119
- Telephone code: (+91)8395
- ISO 3166 code: IN-KA
- Vehicle registration: KA-34
- Website: sandoortown.mrc.gov.in

Sandūru (often written Sandur) is a town in Ballari district in the Indian state of Karnataka. It is the administrative seat of Sanduru taluka Sandur was ruled by the Ghorpade royal family of the Marathas.

== Geography ==
Sanduru is located at 15.1°N 76.55°E. It has an average elevation of 565 metres (1853 feet).

Sandur, like the surrounding villages of Dowlthpur, Ramgad, Swamihalli, Donimalai, Ubbalagandi is set among green mountains, valleys, and deep gorges.

== Climate ==
Sandur has a tropical savannah climate, lying near the transition from the semi-arid type of neighboring Ballari and Hospet. Due to its elevation, Sandur is generally cooler than its surroundings. The maximum recorded temperature is 42.2 °C (108.0 °F), and the minimum is 5.5 °C (41.9 °F) degrees. Sandur typically receives 750 millimetres (30 in) of precipitation per year but has also seen more than 1,000 millimetres (39 in).

Climate data for Sandur
Month	Jan	Feb	Mar	Apr	May	Jun	Jul	Aug	Sep	Oct	Nov	Dec	Year
Record high °C (°F)	34.0 (93.2)	36.0 (96.8)	39.5 (103.1)	42.2 (108.0)	41.5 (106.7)	39.0 (102.2)	34.0 (93.2)	35.5 (95.9)	34.8 (94.6)	36.0 (96.8)	33.5 (92.3)	32.0 (89.6)	42.2 (108.0)
Mean daily maximum °C (°F)	27.8 (82.0)	32.0 (89.6)	35.0 (95.0)	37.5 (99.5)	36.8 (98.2)	32.0 (89.6)	29.0 (84.2)	28.5 (83.3)	27.0 (80.6)	29.0 (84.2)	28.6 (83.5)	27.0 (80.6)	30.9 (87.5)
Mean daily minimum °C (°F)	14.3 (57.7)	16.6 (61.9)	19.8 (67.6)	22.8 (73.0)	22.2 (72.0)	20.8 (69.4)	20.5 (68.9)	19.5 (67.1)	19.0 (66.2)	19.0 (66.2)	15.9 (60.6)	13.0 (55.4)	18.6 (65.5)
Record low °C (°F)	5.5 (41.9)	7.5 (45.5)	9.0 (48.2)	15.0 (59.0)	16.0 (60.8)	16.0 (60.8)	15.0 (59.0)	15.0 (59.0)	12.0 (53.6)	12.0 (53.6)	7.4 (45.3)	6.0 (42.8)	5.5 (41.9)
Average precipitation mm (inches)	2.7 (0.11)	3 (0.1)	15 (0.6)	23 (0.9)	61 (2.4)	69 (2.7)	107 (4.2)	148 (5.8)	181 (7.1)	100 (3.9)	44 (1.7)	14 (0.6)	767.7 (30.11)

== Demographics ==
As of 2011, Sandur had a population of 37,431. Males constituted about 51% of the population and females 49%. 14% of the population was under 6 years of age. The literacy rate was 67%.

== See also ==
- Sandur
