= T. S. Srivatsa =

Indian politician

Member of Karnataka Legislative Assembly
- Incumbent
- Assumed office 22 May 2023
- Preceded by: S. A. Ramdas
- Constituency: Krishnaraja

Personal details
- Born: 3 November 1967 (age 58)
- Party: Bharatiya Janata party
- Education: Banumaiah College, Mysuru

Talakadu Srinivasatatachar Srivatsa (born 1967) is an Indian politician from Karnataka. He is a member of the Karnataka Legislative Assembly representing Krishnaraja Assembly constituency in Mysore City. He won the 2023 Assembly election.

== Career ==
Srivatsa won from Krishnaraja Assembly constituency representing BJP in the 2023 Karnataka Legislative Assembly election. He succeeded S. A. Ramdas, a four time MLA, also from BJP. He polled 73,670 votes and defeated his nearest rival and two time MLA, M. K. Somashekar of Indian National Congress by a margin of 7,213 votes. He is the lone BJP MLA from Mysuru District in the 2023 election.

He is also BJP president for Mysore City.

== Electoral statistics ==
| Year | Constituency | Party | Result | Votes | Opposition Candidate | Opposition Party | Opposition votes | Margin |
|---|---|---|---|---|---|---|---|---|
| 2023 | Krishnaraja | BJP | Won | 73,670 | M.K.Somashekar | INC | 66,457 | 7,213 |
