= Shettar ministry =

Government of Karnataka, India (2012–13)

- 29th Ministry of Karnataka
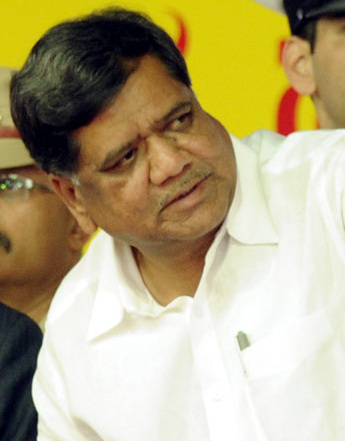
- Jagadish Shettar
- Date formed: 12 July 2012
- Date dissolved: 13 May 2013

People and organisations
- Head of state: Hans Raj Bhardwaj (24 June 2009 – 29 June 2014)
- Head of government: Jagadish Shettar
- Member parties: Bharatiya Janata Party
- Status in legislature: Majority
- Opposition party: Indian National Congress; Janata Dal (Secular)
- Opposition leader: Siddaramaiah(assembly)

History
- Election: 2008
- Outgoing election: 2013
- Legislature term: 5 years
- Predecessor: D. V. Sadananda Gowda ministry
- Successor: First Siddaramaiah ministry

This is a list of minister from Jagadish Shettar cabinets starting from 12 July 2012 to 13 May 2013. Jagadish Shettar is the leader of Bharatiya Janata Party was sworn in the Chief Minister of Karnataka on 12 July 2012. Here is the list of the ministers of his ministry.

== Council of Ministers ==
Souyrce:

Portfolio	Minister	Took office	Left office	Party
Chief Minister; Department Personnel and Administrative Reforms; Cabinet Affairs; Intelligence; Finance; Bangalore Development; Tourism; IT & BT; Mines & Geology; Other departments not allocated to any Minister	Jagadish Shettar	12 July 2012	13 May 2013	BJP
Deputy Chief Minister; Minister of Home Affairs; Minister of Transport	R. Ashoka	12 July 2012	13 May 2013	BJP
Deputy Chief Minister; Minister of Revenue; Minister of Rural Development & Panchayat Raj	K. S. Eshwarappa	12 July 2012	13 May 2013	BJP
Minister of Minor Irrigation; Minister of Kannada & Culture	Govind Karjol	12 July 2012	13 May 2013	BJP
Minister of Law & Justice; Minister of Parliamentary Affairs & Legislation; Minister of Urban Development	S. Suresh Kumar	12 July 2012	13 May 2013	BJP
Minister of Primary & Secondary Education	Vishweshwar Hegde Kageri	12 July 2012	13 May 2013	BJP
Minister of Major & Medium Irrigation	Basavaraj Bommai	12 July 2012	13 May 2013	BJP
Minister of Public Works Department	C. M. Udasi	12 July 2012	23 January 2013	BJP
Minister of Agriculture	Umesh Katti	12 July 2012	13 May 2013	BJP
Minister of Energy	Shobha Karandlaje	12 July 2012	23 January 2013	BJP
Minister of Large & Medium Scale Industries	Murugesh Nirani	12 July 2012	13 May 2013	BJP
Minister of Housing	V. Somanna	12 July 2012	13 May 2013	BJP
Minister of Labour; Minister of Sericulture	B. N. Bache Gowda	12 July 2012	13 May 2013	BJP
Minister of Excise	M. P. Renukacharya	12 July 2012	27 March 2013	BJP
Minister of Forest	C. P. Yogeeshwara	12 July 2012	21 February 2013	BJP
Minister of Sugar Industries; Minister of Horticulture	S. A. Ravindranath	12 July 2012	13 May 2013	BJP
Minister of Animal Husbandry	Revu Naik Belamgi	12 July 2012	13 May 2013	BJP
Minister of Municipal Administration; Minister of Public Enterprises Department	Balachandra Jarkiholi	12 July 2012	13 May 2013	BJP
Minister of Medical Education	S. A. Ramdas	12 July 2012	13 May 2013	BJP
Minister of Fisheries; Minister of Science & Technology	Anand Asnotikar	12 July 2012	13 May 2013	BJP
Minister of Social Welfare	A. Narayanswamy	12 July 2012	13 May 2013	BJP
Minister of Textiles	Varthur Prakash	12 July 2012	13 May 2013	Independent
Minister of Small Scale Industries	Narasimha Nayak	12 July 2012	21 February 2013	BJP
Minister of Ecology & Environment; Minister of Planning & Statistics	Sogadu Shivanna	12 July 2012	13 May 2013	BJP
Minister of Higher Education	C. T. Ravi	12 July 2012	13 May 2013	BJP
Minister of Food & Civil Supplies	D. N. Jeevaraj	12 July 2012	13 May 2013	BJP
Minister of Haj & Wakf; Minister of Agriculture Marketing	S. K. Bellubbi	12 July 2012	13 May 2013	BJP
Minister of Health & Family Welfare	Arvind Limbavali	12 July 2012	13 May 2013	BJP
Minister of Cooperation	B. J. Puttaswamy	12 July 2012	13 May 2013	BJP
Minister of Tourism	Anand Singh	12 July 2012	13 May 2013	BJP
Minister of Women & Child Development	Kalakappa G Bandi	12 July 2012	13 May 2013	BJP
Minister of Ports & Inland Transport; Minister of Muzrai	Kota Srinivas Poojary	12 July 2012	13 May 2013	BJP
Minister of Youth Affairs & Sports	Appachu Ranjan	12 July 2012	13 May 2013	BJP
Minister of Infrastructure Development	Sunil Vallyapure	12 July 2012	11 December 2012	BJP

== See also ==
- Politics of Karnataka
