= Sadananda Gowda ministry =

Government of Karnataka, India (2011–12)

- 28th Ministry of Karnataka
- 2011 - 2012
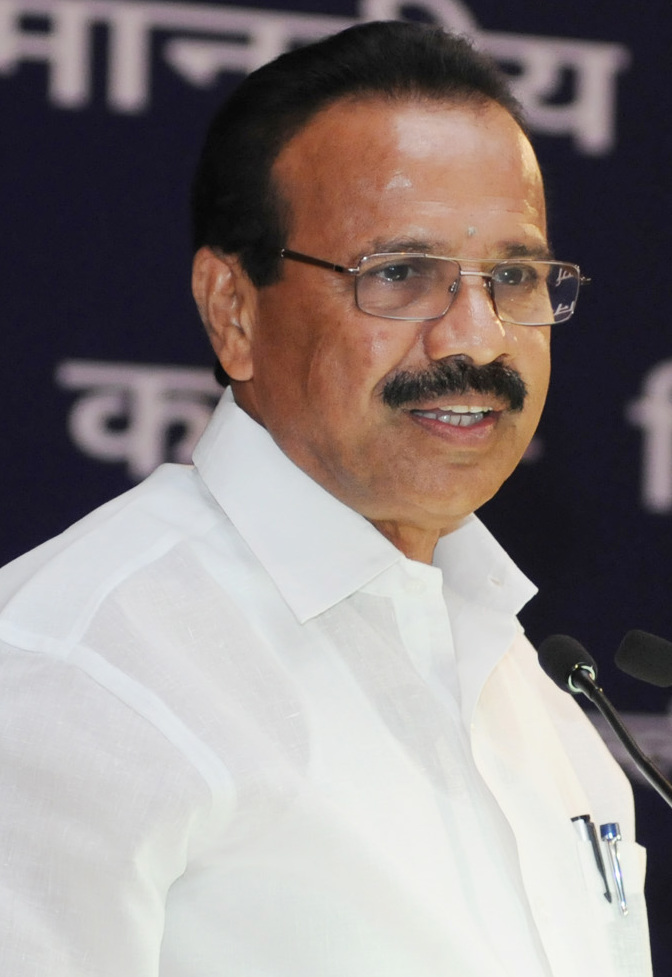
- D. V. Sadananda Gowda; Hon'ble Chief Minister of Karnataka
- Date formed: 4 August 2011
- Date dissolved: 12 July 2012

People and organisations
- Head of state: Hon'ble Governor of Karnataka; Hans Raj Bhardwaj (24 June 2009 – 29 June 2014)
- Head of government: D. V. Sadananda Gowda
- No. of ministers: 32
- Total no. of members: 33
- Member parties: Bharatiya Janata Party
- Status in legislature: Majority
- Opposition party: Indian National Congress; Janata Dal (Secular)

History
- Election: 2008
- Outgoing election: 2013 (After Shettar ministry)
- Legislature term: 5 years
- Predecessor: Second Yeddyurappa ministry
- Successor: Shettar ministry

This is a list of minister from D. V. Sadananda Gowda cabinets starting from 4 August 2011 to 12 July 2012. D. V. Sadananda Gowda is the leader of Bharatiya Janata Party was sworn in the Chief Ministers of Karnataka on 4 August 2011. Here is the list of the ministers of his ministry.

== Council of Ministers ==
Cabinet
Portfolio	Minister	Took office	Left office	Party
Chief Minister; Department Personnel and Administrative Reforms; Cabinet Affairs; Intelligence; Finance; Revenue; Health & Family Welfare; Tourism; Infrastructure Development; Mines & Geology; Other departments not allocated to any Minister	D. V. Sadananda Gowda	4 August 2011	12 July 2012	BJP
Minister of Home Affairs; Minister of Transport	R. Ashoka	4 August 2011	12 July 2012	BJP
Minister of Rural Development & Panchayat Raj	Jagadish Shettar	4 August 2011	12 July 2012	BJP
Minister of Minor Irrigation; Minister of Kannada & Culture	Govind Karjol	4 August 2011	12 July 2012	BJP
Minister of Higher Education; Minister of IT & BT; Minister of Planning & Statistics	V. S. Acharya	4 August 2011	14 February 2012	BJP
Minister of Public Works Department	C. M. Udasi	4 August 2011	12 July 2012	BJP
Minister of Law & Justice; Minister of Parliamentary Affairs & Legislation; Minister of Urban Development	S. Suresh Kumar	4 August 2011	12 July 2012	BJP
Minister of Cooperation	Laxman Savadi	4 August 2011	9 February 2012	BJP
Minister of Primary & Secondary Education	Vishweshwar Hegde Kageri	4 August 2011	12 July 2012	BJP
Minister of Energy	Shobha Karandlaje	4 August 2011	12 July 2012	BJP
Minister of Excise	M. P. Renukacharya	4 August 2011	12 July 2012	BJP
Minister of Major & Medium Irrigation	Basavaraj Bommai	4 August 2011	12 July 2012	BJP
Minister of Large & Medium Scale Industries	Murugesh Nirani	4 August 2011	12 July 2012	BJP
Minister of Ports & Inland Transport; Minister of Environment & Ecology; Minister of Muzrai	J. Krishna Palemar	4 August 2011	9 February 2012	BJP
Minister of Labour; Minister of Sericulture	B. N. Bache Gowda	4 August 2011	12 July 2012	BJP
Minister of Sugar Industries; Minister of Horticulture	S. A. Ravindranath	4 August 2011	12 July 2012	BJP
Minister of Municipal Administration; Minister of Public Enterprises Department	Balachandra Jarkiholi	4 August 2011	12 July 2012	BJP
Minister of Fisheries; Minister of Science & Technology	Anand Asnotikar	4 August 2011	12 July 2012	BJP
Minister of Agriculture	Umesh Katti	4 August 2011	12 July 2012	BJP
Minister of Social Welfare	A. Narayanswamy	4 August 2011	12 July 2012	BJP
Minister of Women & Child Development	C. C. Patil	4 August 2011	9 February 2012	BJP
Minister of Housing	V. Somanna	4 August 2011	12 July 2012	BJP
Minister of Medical Education	S. A. Ramdas	4 August 2011	12 July 2012	BJP
Minister of Animal Husbandry	Revu Naik Belamgi	4 August 2011	12 July 2012	BJP
Minister of Textiles	Varthur Prakash	4 August 2011	12 July 2012	Independent
Minister of Small Scale Industries	Narasimha Nayak	4 August 2011	12 July 2012	BJP
Minister of Forest	C. P. Yogeeshwara	4 August 2011	12 July 2012	BJP

== See also ==
- Government of Karnataka
- Karnataka Legislative Assembly
