= D. G. Shanthana Gowda =

Indian politician (born 1949)

D. G. Shanthana Gowda is an Indian politician from Karnataka. He is a four time MLA from Honnali Assembly constituency in Davangere district. He won the 2023 Karnataka Legislative Assembly election representing Indian National Congress.

== Early life and education ==
Gowda is from Honnali, Davangere district. His father Shankarappa Gowda was a farmer. He completed his B.Sc. in 1969 at P.C. Jabin Science College, which is affiliated with Karnataka University, Hubli.

== Career ==
Gowda won from Honnali Assembly constituency representing Indian National Congress in the 2023 Karnataka Legislative Assembly election. He polled 92,392 votes and defeated his nearest rival, M. P. Renukacharya of Bharatiya Janata Party, by a margin of 17,560 votes. Earlier, he lost the 2018 Karnataka Legislative Assembly election to the same opponent, M. P. Renukacharya of Bharatiya Janata party by a narrow margin of 4,233 votes.

Gowda became an MLA for the first time winning as an independent candidate in the 1999 Karnataka Legislative Assembly election. He polled 56,149 votes and defeated the Indian National Congress representative H. B. Krishnamurthy by a margin of 28,993 votes.
