= T. D. Rajegowda =

Indian politician (born 1958)

T. D. Rajegowda (born 27 July 1958) is an Indian politician from Karnataka. He is an MLA from Sringeri Assembly constituency in Chikmagalur district who was elected in the 2023 Karnataka Legislative Assembly election representing Indian National Congress.

== Early life and education ==
Rajegowda is from Bassapura, Khandya, Chikmagalur Taluk and district. His father Devegowda is a planter. He completed his B.Com. in 1980 from Bandakar Graduate College, Kundapura. He has a daughter, Sanjana. and Son Rajdev

== Political career ==
Rajegowda won from Sringeri Assembly constituency representing Indian National Congress in the 2023 Karnataka Legislative Assembly election. He polled 59,171 votes and defeated his nearest rival, D. N. Jeevaraj of Bharatiya Janata Party, by a narrow margin of 201 votes. Earlier he won as an MLA for the first time in the 2018 Karnataka Legislative Assembly election.

He was appointed chairman for Renewable Energy Development Corporation on 26 January 2024.

Rajegowda also served as the President of Zilla Panchayat Chikmagalur District
