= H. V. Rajeeva =

Indian Politician

- Constituency: Krishnaraja

Personal details
- Born: 21 June 1968 (age 57) Chamarajanagar, Karnataka, India
- Party: Indian National Congress
- Education: Bachelor of Science in 1989
- Occupation: Politician, Social worker

Hebbasuru Vittal Rao Rajeeva is an Indian politician, Mysore, Karnataka.This long time BJP leader embraced and joined the Congress party in March 2024.

== Early life ==
Rajeeva was born in Hebbasuru, Chamarajanagar. His father was Hebbasuru Vithalarao and his mother was Saralamba. He studied at JSS, Chamarajanagar, and his degree in Science (BSc) at the University of Mysore.

== Career ==
20+ years BJP leader, joined Congress in 2024. He received a grand welcome into the Congress.

Rajeeva was a member of the BJP and of the RSS. He has worked in the Krishnaraja constituency since 1994. He was appointed general secretary of the Mysore BJP. In 2004 Rajeeva instituted the Pramati Educational and Cultural Trust. In 2008 he became the chairman of the Yuva Dasara program in Mysore. He became co-convener for BJP Sahakari Prakoshta Karnataka in 2010. He is the Director and Vice president, Federation of Karnataka state co-operatives. In October 2014, Rajeev set up a Rajeev Sneha Balaga and supported Narendra Modi's Swachh Bharat campaign. More than 150 programs have been organised in different parts of the city.

== Awards ==
- Pride of Mysore in 2017 by Pragathi Pratisthan
- Basava Rathna award in June 2017
