= Sringeri Assembly constituency =

Legislative Assembly constituency in Karnataka, India

Coordinates: 13.42°N 75.26°E

Sringeri
- Constituency No. 123 for the Karnataka Legislative Assembly

Constituency details
- Country: India
- Region: South India
- State: Karnataka
- District: Chikkamagaluru
- Lok Sabha constituency: Udupi Chikmagalur
- Established: 1956
- Total electors: 170,579
- Reservation: None

Member of Legislative Assembly
- 16th Karnataka Legislative Assembly
- Incumbent T. D. Rajegowda
- Party: Indian National Congress
- Elected year: 2023* (After Supreme Court Restoration)
- Preceded by: D. N. Jeevaraj

Sringeri Assembly constituency is one of the 224 seats in Karnataka State Assembly in India. It is part of Udupi Chikmagalur Lok Sabha constituency.

== Members of the Legislative Assembly ==
Election	Member	Party
1957	Kadidal Manjappa	Indian National Congress
1962	Kadidal Manjappa	Indian National Congress
1967	K. N. Veerappa Gowda	Indian National Congress
1972	K. N. Veerappa Gowda	Indian National Congress
1978	B. Ramaiah	Indian National Congress
1983	H. G. Govinde Gowda	Janata Party
1985	N. P. Govinda Gowda	Janata Party
1989	U. K. Shamanna	Indian National Congress
1994	H. G. Govinde Gowda	Janata Dal
1999	D. B. Chandregowda	Indian National Congress
2004	D. N. Jeevaraj	Bharatiya Janata Party
2008	D. N. Jeevaraj	Bharatiya Janata Party
2013	D. N. Jeevaraj	Bharatiya Janata Party
2018	T. D. Rajegowda	Indian National Congress
2023	T. D. Rajegowda	Indian National Congress

== Election results ==
=== Assembly Election 2023 ===
2023 Karnataka Legislative Assembly election : Sringeri
Party	Candidate	Votes	%	±%
INC	T. D. Rajegowda	59,171	41.79	▼4.02
BJP	D. N. Jeevaraj	58,970	41.65	▼2.71
JD(S)	Sudhakara. S. Shetty	19,417	13.71	▲6.56
AAP	Rajan Gowda. H. S	1,150	0.81	New
NOTA	None of the above	678	0.48	▼0.26
Margin of victory		201	0.14	▼1.31
Turnout		141,859	83.16	▲0.57
Total valid votes		141,580		
Registered electors		170,579		▲2.74
INC hold		Swing	▼4.02	

=== Assembly Election 2018 ===
2018 Karnataka Legislative Assembly election : Sringeri
Party	Candidate	Votes	%	±%
INC	T. D. Rajegowda	62,780	45.81	▼4.04
BJP	D. N. Jeevaraj	60,791	44.36	▼8.62
JD(S)	H. G. Venkatesh	9,799	7.15	▲3.57
Independent	Praveen Khandya	1,294	0.94	New
NOTA	None of the above	1,015	0.74	New
Margin of victory		1,989	1.45	▼1.68
Turnout		137,128	82.59	▲2.51
Total valid votes		137,053		
Registered electors		166,026		▲10.64
INC gain from BJP		Swing	▼7.17	

=== Assembly Election 2013 ===
2013 Karnataka Legislative Assembly election : Sringeri
Party	Candidate	Votes	%	±%
BJP	D. N. Jeevaraj	58,402	52.98	▲12.62
INC	T. D. Rajegowda	54,950	49.85	▲11.57
JD(S)	T. C. Rajendra	3,941	3.58	▼10.38
Independent	K. V. Mahesh Kumar	1,018	0.92	New
Margin of victory		3,452	3.13	▲1.05
Turnout		120,178	80.08	▲3.51
Total valid votes		110,237		
Registered electors		150,064		▲6.16
BJP hold		Swing	▲12.62	

=== Assembly Election 2008 ===
2008 Karnataka Legislative Assembly election : Sringeri
Party	Candidate	Votes	%	±%
BJP	D. N. Jeevaraj	43,646	40.36	▼5.61
INC	D. B. Chandregowda	41,396	38.28	▲10.03
JD(S)	Rajendra. H. T	15,095	13.96	▼4.47
BSP	Ravishankar. M. R	4,758	4.40	▼1.57
Independent	K. C. Prakash	1,773	1.64	New
Rashtriya Hindustan Sena Karnataka	Shree Prasad. B. M	842	0.78	New
Margin of victory		2,250	2.08	▼15.64
Turnout		108,237	76.57	▲1.61
Total valid votes		108,145		
Registered electors		141,356		▲2.96
BJP hold		Swing	▼5.61	

=== Assembly Election 2004 ===
2004 Karnataka Legislative Assembly election : Sringeri
Party	Candidate	Votes	%	±%
BJP	D. N. Jeevaraj	47,263	45.97	▼0.08
INC	D. B. Chandregowda	29,042	28.25	▼22.82
JD(S)	Rajendra. H. T	18,951	18.43	▲16.12
BSP	K. M. Gopala	6,134	5.97	New
Kannada Nadu Party	Ramananda. K. G	1,422	1.38	New
Margin of victory		18,221	17.72	▲12.71
Turnout		102,915	74.96	▲3.74
Total valid votes		102,812		
Registered electors		137,293		▲4.70
BJP gain from INC		Swing	▼5.10	

=== Assembly Election 1999 ===
1999 Karnataka Legislative Assembly election : Sringeri
Party	Candidate	Votes	%	±%
INC	D. B. Chandregowda	46,579	51.07	▲29.91
BJP	D. N. Jeevaraj	42,008	46.05	▲14.24
JD(S)	Kolale Redrappa	2,106	2.31	New
Margin of victory		4,571	5.01	▼4.16
Turnout		93,398	71.22	▼0.62
Total valid votes		91,215		
Rejected ballots		2,096	2.24	▲1.03
Registered electors		131,132		▲5.97
INC gain from JD		Swing	▲10.09	

=== Assembly Election 1994 ===
1994 Karnataka Legislative Assembly election : Sringeri
Party	Candidate	Votes	%	±%
JD	H. G. Govinde Gowda	35,991	40.98	▲13.19
BJP	D. N. Jeevaraj	27,939	31.81	New
INC	U. K. Shamanna	18,581	21.16	▼23.20
INC	B. G. Chidambar	4,498	5.12	New
Margin of victory		8,052	9.17	▼7.40
Turnout		88,898	71.84	▼2.67
Total valid votes		87,823		
Rejected ballots		1,075	1.21	▼3.20
Registered electors		123,746		▲5.91
JD gain from INC		Swing	▼3.38	

=== Assembly Election 1989 ===
1989 Karnataka Legislative Assembly election : Sringeri
Party	Candidate	Votes	%	±%
INC	U. K. Shamanna	36,912	44.36	▼1.80
JD	H. G. Govinde Gowda	23,122	27.79	New
JP	T. Prakash	8,731	10.49	New
Independent	K. V. Ramappaiah	7,094	8.52	New
CPI	M. L. Xavier	6,564	7.89	New
Margin of victory		13,790	16.57	▲16.44
Turnout		87,058	74.51	▲0.84
Total valid votes		83,215		
Rejected ballots		3,843	4.41	▲3.41
Registered electors		116,846		▲29.20
INC gain from JP		Swing	▼1.92	

=== Assembly Election 1985 ===
1985 Karnataka Legislative Assembly election : Sringeri
Party	Candidate	Votes	%	±%
JP	N. P. Govinda Gowda	30,529	46.28	▼8.39
INC	U. K. Shamanna	30,446	46.16	▲2.19
BJP	A. M. Srikantagowda	3,827	5.80	New
Independent	M. K. Dayananda	579	0.88	New
Margin of victory		83	0.13	▼10.56
Turnout		66,625	73.67	▲6.35
Total valid votes		65,959		
Rejected ballots		666	1.00	▼0.34
Registered electors		90,441		▲8.49
JP hold		Swing	▼8.39	

=== Assembly Election 1983 ===
1983 Karnataka Legislative Assembly election : Sringeri
Party	Candidate	Votes	%	±%
JP	H. G. Govinde Gowda	30,270	54.67	▲19.41
INC	B. Ramaiah Begane	24,349	43.97	▲39.07
Independent	S. B. Prabhakara	579	1.05	New
Margin of victory		5,921	10.69	▼13.88
Turnout		56,123	67.32	▼10.90
Total valid votes		55,373		
Rejected ballots		750	1.34	▼0.48
Registered electors		83,366		▲10.35
JP gain from INC(I)		Swing	▼5.17	

=== Assembly Election 1978 ===
1978 Karnataka Legislative Assembly election : Sringeri
Party	Candidate	Votes	%	±%
INC(I)	B. Ramaiah	34,716	59.84	New
JP	H. V. Srikanta Bhatta	20,458	35.26	New
INC	K. N. Veerappa Gowda	2,845	4.90	▼52.08
Margin of victory		14,258	24.57	▼9.83
Turnout		59,092	78.22	▲7.60
Total valid votes		58,019		
Rejected ballots		1,073	1.82	▲1.82
Registered electors		75,545		▲14.67
INC(I) gain from INC		Swing	▲2.86	

=== Assembly Election 1972 ===
1972 Mysore State Legislative Assembly election : Sringeri
Party	Candidate	Votes	%	±%
INC	K. N. Veerappa Gowda	25,807	56.98	▲12.85
ABJS	H. V. Srikanta Bhatta	10,226	22.58	▼16.44
SSP	Dyananda Ramappa Kalle	9,261	20.45	New
Margin of victory		15,581	34.40	▲29.30
Turnout		46,524	70.62	▲10.21
Total valid votes		45,294		
Registered electors		65,883		▲27.28
INC hold		Swing	▲12.85	

=== Assembly Election 1967 ===
1967 Mysore State Legislative Assembly election : Sringeri
Party	Candidate	Votes	%	±%
INC	K. N. Veerappa Gowda	12,509	44.13	▼26.36
ABJS	H. V. S. Bhatta	11,062	39.02	New
Independent	N. M. Bhide	4,776	16.85	New
Margin of victory		1,447	5.10	▼38.17
Turnout		31,269	60.41	▼1.98
Total valid votes		28,347		
Registered electors		51,763		▼12.72
INC hold		Swing	▼26.36	

=== Assembly Election 1962 ===
1962 Mysore State Legislative Assembly election : Sringeri
Party	Candidate	Votes	%	±%
INC	Kadidal Manjappa	24,824	70.49	New
Independent	N. P. Govinda Gowda	9,587	27.22	New
Independent	H. P. Ganapathi Prabhu	805	2.29	New
Margin of victory		15,237	43.27	
Turnout		37,002	62.39	
Total valid votes		35,216		
Registered electors		59,304		
INC hold		Swing		

=== Assembly Election 1957 ===
1957 Mysore State Legislative Assembly election : Sringeri
Party	Candidate	Votes	%	±%
INC	Kadidal Manjappa	Unopposed		
Registered electors		45,179		
INC win (new seat)				

== See also ==
- Chikkamagaluru district
- List of constituencies of Karnataka Legislative Assembly
