= M. K. Somashekar =

Indian politician

M. K. Somashekhar

MLA
- In office 2013–2018
- Preceded by: S. A. Ramadas
- Succeeded by: S. A. Ramadas
- Constituency: Krishnaraja

MLA
- In office 2004–2008
- Preceded by: S. A. Ramadas
- Succeeded by: S. A. Ramadas
- Constituency: Krishnaraja

Personal details
- Party: Indian National Congress
- Occupation: Politician

M. K. Somashekar is a politician from Karnataka state. He is a leader of Indian National Congress . He was elected twice as MLA from Krishnaraja Constituency.

== Political career ==
He won twice as MLA from Krishnaraja constituency in 2004 and 2013. But in 2018 elections he was defeated by S.A. Ramadas of Bharatiya Janata party. M.K. Somashekar has been appointed as Chairman for Karnataka Silk Development Corporation in 2016.
