= D. N. Jeevaraj =

Indian politician

Political Secretary to the Chief Minister of Karnataka
- In office 2021‍–‍2023 Serving with M. P. Renukacharya
- Chief Minister: Basavaraj Bommai
- In office 19 December 2020 – 4 August 2021 Serving with M. P. Renukacharya
- Chief Minister: B. S. Yediyurappa

Cabinet Minister Government of Karnataka
- In office 12 July 2012 – 13 May 2013
- Ministry: Term
- Minister of Food, Civil Supplies & Consumer Affairs: 12 July 2012 - 13 May 2013

Member of Karnataka Legislative Assembly
- In office 2004–2018
- Preceded by: D. B. Chandregowda
- Succeeded by: T. D. Raje Gowda
- Constituency: Sringeri
- Incumbent
- Assumed office 2026
- Preceded by: T.D. Rajegowda
- Constituency: Sringeri

Personal details
- Born: 3 October 1964 (age 61) Thirthahalli
- Party: Bharatiya Janata Party
- Occupation: Politician

D. N. Jeevaraj is an Indian politician associated with Bharatiya Janata Party in Karnataka. He was serving as Political Secretary to the Chief Minister of Karnataka along with M. P. Renukacharya.

== Political career ==
D. N. Jeevaraj entered mainstream politics by contesting 1994 Karnataka election from Sringeri. He lost the election against H. G. Govinda Gowda of Janata Dal. He contested from Sringeri again in 1999 Karnataka election and lost to D. B. Chandregowda who had contested from the ticket of Indian National Congress.

In 2004 he defeated sitting MLA D. B. Chandregowda by a margin of 18,221 votes and was consecutively re-elected in 2008 and 2013. He was sworn in as a Minister in the Jagadish Shettar ministry and allotted the department of Food, Civil Supplies & Consumer Affairs, a post which he held till the Jagadish Shettar led Govt lost power to the Indian National Congress in the 2013 Karnataka Legislative Assembly election.

He lost the 2018 Karnataka Legislative Assembly election from Sringeri to T. D. Rajegowda of Congress with a meagre margin of 1989 votes. He was appointed Political Secretary to the Chief Minister of Karnataka B. S. Yediyurappa on 19 December 2020 after S. R. Vishwanath resigned. On 30 September 2021 Basavaraj Bommai re-appointed him as his Political Secretary, despite the fact that Bommai himself had relieved him of this responsibility.
