= Krishnaraja Assembly constituency =

Legislative Assembly constituency in Karnataka, India

Coordinates: 12.276°N 76.630°E

Krishnaraja
- Constituency No. 216 for the Karnataka Legislative Assembly
- Map of Assembly constituency

Constituency details
- Country: India
- Region: South India
- State: Karnataka
- District: Mysore
- Lok Sabha constituency: Mysore
- Established: 1967
- Total electors: 250,435 (2023)
- Reservation: None

Member of Legislative Assembly
- 16th Karnataka Legislative Assembly
- Incumbent T. S. Srivatsa
- Party: Bharatiya Janata Party
- Elected year: 2023
- Preceded by: S. A. Ramadas

Assembly Constituencies of Mysore district

Krishnaraja Assembly constituency is one of the 224 constituencies in the Karnataka Legislative Assembly of Karnataka, having all the areas under the zone of Mysore South such as Ashokapuram, Vidyaranyapuram, JP Nagar, Srirampura, Mysore Palace, Agrahara, KR circle, and Vishweranagara. It is also part of Mysore Lok Sabha constituency.

== Members of the Legislative Assembly ==
Election	Member	Party
1967	S. Channaiah	Independent politician
1972	D. Suryanarayana	Indian National Congress
1978	H. Gangadharan	Janata Party
1983	N. H. Gangadhara	Bharatiya Janata Party
1985	Vedant Hemmige	Janata Party
1989	K. N. Somasundaram	Indian National Congress
1994	S. A. Ramadas	Bharatiya Janata Party
1999	S. A. Ramadas	Bharatiya Janata Party
2004	M. K. Somashekar	Janata Dal
2008	S. A. Ramadas	Bharatiya Janata Party
2013	M. K. Somashekar	Indian National Congress
2018	S. A. Ramadas	Bharatiya Janata Party
2023	T. S. Srivatsa	Bharatiya Janata Party

== Election results ==
=== Assembly Election 2023 ===
2023 Karnataka Legislative Assembly election : Krishnaraja
Party	Candidate	Votes	%	±%
BJP	T. S. Srivatsa	73,670	49.01	▼4.47
INC	M. K. Somashekar	66,457	44.21	▲8.66
JD(S)	K. V. Mallesh	5,027	3.34	▼4.56
NOTA	None of the above	1,306	0.87	▼0.11
UPP	Sumalatha. S	1,159	0.77	New
Margin of victory		7,213	4.80	▼13.13
Turnout		151,322	60.42	▲0.88
Total valid votes		150,322		
Registered electors		250,435		▲1.34
BJP hold		Swing	▼4.47	

=== Assembly Election 2018 ===
2018 Karnataka Legislative Assembly election : Krishnaraja
Party	Candidate	Votes	%	±%
BJP	S. A. Ramadas	78,573	53.48	▲13.27
INC	M. K. Somashekar	52,226	35.55	▼9.90
JD(S)	K. V. Mallesh	11,607	7.90	▲1.43
NOTA	None of the above	1,441	0.98	New
Margin of victory		26,347	17.93	▲12.69
Turnout		147,135	59.54	▲0.41
Total valid votes		146,908		
Registered electors		247,135		▲14.23
BJP gain from INC		Swing	▲8.03	

=== Assembly Election 2013 ===
2013 Karnataka Legislative Assembly election : Krishnaraja
Party	Candidate	Votes	%	±%
INC	M. K. Somashekar	52,611	45.45	▲7.63
BJP	S. A. Ramadas	46,546	40.21	▼14.35
KJP	H. V. Rajeeva	15,573	13.45	New
JD(S)	Vasu. H	7,486	6.47	▲1.82
LSP	Naveena. C. K	1,245	1.08	New
BSP	C. Mohankumar	799	0.69	▼0.18
Independent	M. Pradeep Kumar	765	0.66	New
Margin of victory		6,065	5.24	▼11.50
Turnout		127,914	59.13	▲2.91
Total valid votes		115,764		
Registered electors		216,340		▲4.76
INC gain from BJP		Swing	▼9.11	

=== Assembly Election 2008 ===
2008 Karnataka Legislative Assembly election : Krishnaraja
Party	Candidate	Votes	%	±%
BJP	S. A. Ramadas	63,314	54.56	▲17.28
INC	M. K. Somashekar	43,892	37.82	▲23.27
JD(S)	Shivabasappa	5,398	4.65	▼38.37
Independent	M. Somashekar	1,107	0.95	New
BSP	K. N. Sundar Raju	1,005	0.87	▼0.91
Margin of victory		19,422	16.74	▲11.00
Turnout		116,096	56.22	▲0.46
Total valid votes		116,042		
Registered electors		206,516		▲94.31
BJP gain from JD(S)		Swing	▲11.54	

=== Assembly Election 2004 ===
2004 Karnataka Legislative Assembly election : Krishnaraja
Party	Candidate	Votes	%	±%
JD(S)	M. K. Somashekar	25,439	43.02	▲12.30
BJP	S. A. Ramadas	22,045	37.28	▼8.37
INC	Ramesh. S	8,605	14.55	▼6.14
BSP	Rajashekar. V. B	1,054	1.78	New
JP	Ravindra Ms	792	1.34	New
Kannada Nadu Party	Janardhan. N	554	0.94	New
Independent	Ramdas	379	0.64	New
Margin of victory		3,394	5.74	▼9.19
Turnout		59,263	55.76	▼3.65
Total valid votes		59,136		
Registered electors		106,282		▼3.36
JD(S) gain from BJP		Swing	▼2.63	

=== Assembly Election 1999 ===
1999 Karnataka Legislative Assembly election : Krishnaraja
Party	Candidate	Votes	%	±%
BJP	S. A. Ramadas	29,813	45.65	▼1.90
JD(S)	M. K. Somashekar	20,061	30.72	New
INC	T. S. Ravishankar	13,511	20.69	▲10.00
Kannada Chalavali Vatal Paksha	M. Suneel	797	1.22	New
Independent	Dr. S. M. Sheshanna	697	1.07	New
Independent	H. V. Venkatesubbarao	422	0.65	New
Margin of victory		9,752	14.93	▼0.86
Turnout		65,332	59.41	▲3.46
Total valid votes		65,301		
Rejected ballots		17	0.03	▼1.58
Registered electors		109,974		▲2.10
BJP hold		Swing	▼1.90	

=== Assembly Election 1994 ===
1994 Karnataka Legislative Assembly election : Krishnaraja
Party	Candidate	Votes	%	±%
BJP	S. A. Ramadas	28,190	47.55	▲37.25
JD	M. Vedantha Hemmige	18,827	31.76	▼1.79
INC	K. N. Somasundaram	6,336	10.69	▼40.05
Independent	Kiran	2,224	3.75	New
JP	S. Srinivasa Murthy	944	1.59	New
INC	M. P. Shankar	785	1.32	New
Margin of victory		9,363	15.79	▼1.40
Turnout		60,262	55.95	▼0.97
Total valid votes		59,279		
Rejected ballots		970	1.61	▼2.69
Registered electors		107,707		▲3.64
BJP gain from INC		Swing	▼3.19	

=== Assembly Election 1989 ===
1989 Karnataka Legislative Assembly election : Krishnaraja
Party	Candidate	Votes	%	±%
INC	K. N. Somasundaram	28,722	50.74	▲18.04
JD	M. Vedantha Hemmige	18,990	33.55	New
BJP	H. Veerarhadraiah	5,830	10.30	▼1.75
JP	C. N. N. Murthy	2,871	5.07	New
Margin of victory		9,732	17.19	▲1.52
Turnout		59,148	56.92	▲4.97
Total valid votes		56,607		
Rejected ballots		2,541	4.30	▲3.17
Registered electors		103,921		▲25.00
INC gain from JP		Swing	▲2.37	

=== Assembly Election 1985 ===
1985 Karnataka Legislative Assembly election : Krishnaraja
Party	Candidate	Votes	%	±%
JP	Vedant Hemmige	20,657	48.37	▲27.30
INC	Srikanta Sharma	13,965	32.70	▲15.46
BJP	H. Gangadharan	5,146	12.05	▼36.88
Independent	S. Jnana Shankar	1,043	2.44	New
Independent	V. Dasappa	949	2.22	New
Independent	S. Boregowda	302	0.71	New
Margin of victory		6,692	15.67	▼12.18
Turnout		43,195	51.95	▼6.61
Total valid votes		42,707		
Rejected ballots		488	1.13	▼1.03
Registered electors		83,140		▲10.12
JP gain from BJP		Swing	▼0.56	

=== Assembly Election 1983 ===
1983 Karnataka Legislative Assembly election : Krishnaraja
Party	Candidate	Votes	%	±%
BJP	N. H. Gangadhara	21,163	48.93	New
JP	T. V. Srinivasa Rao	9,116	21.07	▼39.22
INC	J. Kamalaraman	7,459	17.24	▲15.47
Independent	V. Venkataesh	3,406	7.87	New
Independent	C. Nataraj	556	1.29	New
Independent	Vittala Rao	348	0.80	New
Independent	B. K. Athmaram	341	0.79	New
Independent	H. Lakshminarayana Rao	306	0.71	New
Margin of victory		12,047	27.85	▲3.96
Turnout		44,209	58.56	▼4.81
Total valid votes		43,256		
Rejected ballots		953	2.16	▲0.34
Registered electors		75,497		▲12.88
BJP gain from JP		Swing	▼11.36	

=== Assembly Election 1978 ===
1978 Karnataka Legislative Assembly election : Krishnaraja
Party	Candidate	Votes	%	±%
JP	H. Gangadharan	25,091	60.29	New
INC(I)	K. S. Suryanarayana Rao	15,150	36.41	New
INC	M. S. Neamath Khan	736	1.77	▼42.27
Margin of victory		9,941	23.89	▼1.49
Turnout		42,386	63.37	▲12.98
Total valid votes		41,615		
Rejected ballots		771	1.82	▲1.82
Registered electors		66,884		▲1.41
JP gain from INC		Swing	▲16.25	

=== Assembly Election 1972 ===
1972 Mysore State Legislative Assembly election : Krishnaraja
Party	Candidate	Votes	%	±%
INC	D. Suryanarayana	14,150	44.04	▲18.48
ABJS	H. Gangadharan	5,994	18.66	▲3.62
Independent	M. Venkatalingaiah	3,502	10.90	New
CPI(M)	B. A. Belliappa	3,122	9.72	New
Independent	Srikanta Sharma	2,367	7.37	New
SSP	M. Vedantha Hemmige	1,414	4.40	New
INC(O)	K. Siddaiah	1,236	3.85	New
Independent	H. K. Anantha	245	0.76	New
Margin of victory		8,156	25.38	▲17.64
Turnout		33,235	50.39	▲3.76
Total valid votes		32,130		
Registered electors		65,955		▲4.86
INC gain from Independent		Swing	▲10.74	

=== Assembly Election 1967 ===
1967 Mysore State Legislative Assembly election : Krishnaraja
Party	Candidate	Votes	%	±%
Independent	S. Channaiah	9,041	33.30	New
INC	B. N. Swamy	6,940	25.56	New
SSP	S. Sharma	5,649	20.81	New
ABJS	J. K. Raman	4,084	15.04	New
Independent	M. Sannaiah	1,115	4.11	New
Independent	N. C. B. Rangaiah	320	1.18	New
Margin of victory		2,101	7.74	
Turnout		29,328	46.63	
Total valid votes		27,149		
Registered electors		62,896		
Independent win (new seat)				

== See also ==
- Mysore City South Assembly constituency
- Mysore City North Assembly constituency
- Mysore Taluk Assembly constituency
- Mysore South
- Mysore district
- Mysore Lok Sabha constituency
- List of constituencies of Karnataka Legislative Assembly
