= Honnali Assembly constituency =

Legislative Assembly constituency in Karnataka State, India

Coordinates: 14.24°N 75.64°E

Honnali
- Constituency No. 110 for the Karnataka Legislative Assembly

Constituency details
- Country: India
- Region: South India
- State: Karnataka
- District: Davanagere
- Lok Sabha constituency: Davangere
- Established: 1956
- Total electors: 199,012
- Reservation: None

Member of Legislative Assembly
- 16th Karnataka Legislative Assembly
- Incumbent D. G. Shantana Gowda
- Party: Indian National Congress
- Elected year: 2023
- Preceded by: M. P. Renukacharya

Honnali Assembly constituency is one of the 224 Legislative Assembly constituencies of Karnataka in India.

It is part of Davanagere district. D. G. Shanthana Gowda is the current MLA from Honnali.

== Members of the Legislative Assembly ==
Election	Member	Party
1952	H. S. Rudrappa	Indian National Congress
1957	H. S. Rudrappa	Indian National Congress
1957	A. S. Dudhya Naik	Indian National Congress
1962	D. Parameswarappa	Praja Socialist Party
1967	D. Parameswarappa	Indian National Congress
1972	H. B. Kadasiddappa	Indian National Congress
1978	H. B. Kadasiddappa	Indian National Congress
1983	D. G. Basavana Gowda	Independent politician
1985	D. G. Basavana Gowda	Janata Party
1989	D. B. Gangappa	Indian National Congress
1994	H. B. Krishnamurthy	Karnataka Pradesh Congress Committee
1999	D. G. Shanthana Gowda	Independent politician
2004	M. P. Renukacharya	Bharatiya Janata Party
2008	M. P. Renukacharya	Bharatiya Janata Party
2013	D. G. Shanthana Gowda	Indian National Congress
2018	M. P. Renukacharya	Bharatiya Janata Party
2023	D. G. Shanthana Gowda	Indian National Congress

== Election results ==
=== Assembly Election 2023 ===
2023 Karnataka Legislative Assembly election : Honnali
Party	Candidate	Votes	%	±%
INC	D. G. Shanthana Gowda	92,392	54.31	▲7.12
BJP	M. P. Renukacharya	74,832	43.99	▼5.82
NOTA	None of the above	560	0.33	▼0.44
Margin of victory		17,560	10.32	▲7.70
Turnout		170,266	85.56	▲1.81
Total valid votes		170,124		
Registered electors		199,012		▲2.94
INC gain from BJP		Swing	▲4.50	

=== Assembly Election 2018 ===
2018 Karnataka Legislative Assembly election : Honnali
Party	Candidate	Votes	%	±%
BJP	M. P. Renukacharya	80,624	49.81	▲48.03
INC	Shanthanagowda. D. G	76,391	47.19	▼7.80
BSP	Kathari Satyanarayana Rao	1,395	0.86	New
NOTA	None of the above	1,250	0.77	New
Margin of victory		4,233	2.62	▼10.46
Turnout		161,922	83.75	▼1.95
Total valid votes		161,867		
Registered electors		193,335		▲10.78
BJP gain from INC		Swing	▼5.18	

=== Assembly Election 2013 ===
2013 Karnataka Legislative Assembly election : Honnali
Party	Candidate	Votes	%	±%
INC	D. G. Shanthana Gowda	78,789	54.99	▲11.53
KJP	M. P. Renukacharya	60,051	41.91	New
BJP	Dr. Rajkumar. H. P	2,549	1.78	▼46.65
Sarva Janata Party	Asha. R. Patel	1,563	1.09	New
Independent	Sayedagouse. H. P	1,435	1.00	New
JD(S)	M. R. Mahesh	1,340	0.94	▼1.37
BSRCP	K. Renukachari	1,030	0.72	New
Margin of victory		18,738	13.08	▲8.11
Turnout		149,568	85.70	▲3.06
Total valid votes		143,288		
Registered electors		174,518		▲12.01
INC gain from BJP		Swing	▲6.56	

=== Assembly Election 2008 ===
2008 Karnataka Legislative Assembly election : Honnali
Party	Candidate	Votes	%	±%
BJP	M. P. Renukacharya	62,283	48.43	▲9.87
INC	D. G. Shanthana Gowda	55,897	43.46	▲11.09
JD(S)	Dr. D. B. Gangappa	2,971	2.31	▼19.44
SP	H. B. Shivayogi	2,855	2.22	New
Independent	L. H. Patil	1,470	1.14	New
BSP	M. P. Karibasappa	1,243	0.97	▼3.60
JD(U)	Dr. Thakarsimha	1,060	0.82	New
Margin of victory		6,386	4.97	▼1.21
Turnout		128,758	82.64	▲8.13
Total valid votes		128,604		
Registered electors		155,806		▼4.09
BJP hold		Swing	▲9.87	

=== Assembly Election 2004 ===
2004 Karnataka Legislative Assembly election : Honnali
Party	Candidate	Votes	%	±%
BJP	M. P. Renukacharya	46,593	38.56	▲28.19
INC	Shanthanagowda. D. G	39,119	32.37	▲7.10
JD(S)	H. B. Krishnamurthy	26,283	21.75	▲13.98
BSP	Kuberanaik. S	5,520	4.57	▲1.01
Kannada Nadu Party	Rajkumar. H. P	2,201	1.82	New
Urs Samyuktha Paksha	Thakarsimha. G. R	1,125	0.93	New
Margin of victory		7,474	6.18	▼20.80
Turnout		121,037	74.51	▼2.38
Total valid votes		120,841		
Registered electors		162,445		▲8.56
BJP gain from Independent		Swing	▼13.68	

=== Assembly Election 1999 ===
1999 Karnataka Legislative Assembly election : Honnali
Party	Candidate	Votes	%	±%
Independent	D. G. Shanthana Gowda	56,149	52.24	New
INC	H. B. Krishnamurthy	27,156	25.27	▲9.53
BJP	K. H. Gurumurthy	11,143	10.37	▼1.89
JD(S)	M. Ramesha	8,354	7.77	New
BSP	R. Nagappa	3,821	3.56	New
Independent	Haladappa Dasannara	857	0.80	New
Margin of victory		28,993	26.98	▲25.11
Turnout		115,055	76.89	▲0.16
Total valid votes		107,480		
Rejected ballots		7,503	6.52	▲4.66
Registered electors		149,642		▲4.88
Independent gain from INC		Swing	▲19.74	

=== Assembly Election 1994 ===
1994 Karnataka Legislative Assembly election : Honnali
Party	Candidate	Votes	%	±%
INC	H. B. Krishnamurthy	34,893	32.50	New
Independent	D. G. Basavana Gowda	32,889	30.64	New
INC	D. B. Gangappa	16,902	15.74	▼33.19
BJP	K. H. Gurumurthy	13,159	12.26	New
KRRS	D. K. Bharmappa	3,024	2.82	New
JD	G. Shankaramurthy	2,701	2.52	▼35.40
Independent	M. Rayappa	2,421	2.26	New
Margin of victory		2,004	1.87	▼9.15
Turnout		109,481	76.73	▼1.50
Total valid votes		107,354		
Rejected ballots		2,032	1.86	▼1.82
Registered electors		142,682		▲6.97
INC gain from INC		Swing	▼16.43	

=== Assembly Election 1989 ===
1989 Karnataka Legislative Assembly election : Honnali
Party	Candidate	Votes	%	±%
INC	D. B. Gangappa	49,177	48.93	▲10.82
JD	D. G. Basavana Gowda	38,105	37.92	New
Kranti Sabha	K. Ganeshappa	7,023	6.99	New
JP	Arabagatte Hanumantappa	2,895	2.88	New
Independent	M. Chandrasekharappa	2,510	2.50	New
Margin of victory		11,072	11.02	▼10.78
Turnout		104,339	78.23	▼4.73
Total valid votes		100,498		
Rejected ballots		3,841	3.68	▲2.25
Registered electors		133,382		▲20.83
INC gain from JP		Swing	▼10.98	

=== Assembly Election 1985 ===
1985 Karnataka Legislative Assembly election : Honnali
Party	Candidate	Votes	%	±%
JP	D. G. Basavana Gowda	54,076	59.91	▲34.67
INC	H. B. Krishnamurthy	34,399	38.11	▲17.71
Margin of victory		19,677	21.80	▼7.31
Turnout		91,581	82.96	▲1.94
Total valid votes		90,269		
Rejected ballots		1,312	1.43	▼0.56
Registered electors		110,386		▲14.34
JP gain from Independent		Swing	▲5.55	

=== Assembly Election 1983 ===
1983 Karnataka Legislative Assembly election : Honnali
Party	Candidate	Votes	%	±%
Independent	D. G. Basavana Gowda	41,672	54.36	New
JP	M. Lakshmana	19,352	25.24	▼21.59
INC	M. Rayappa	15,640	20.40	▲17.52
Margin of victory		22,320	29.11	▲26.00
Turnout		78,217	81.02	▼0.58
Total valid votes		76,664		
Rejected ballots		1,553	1.99	▼0.64
Registered electors		96,545		▲13.17
Independent gain from INC(I)		Swing	▲4.43	

=== Assembly Election 1978 ===
1978 Karnataka Legislative Assembly election : Honnali
Party	Candidate	Votes	%	±%
INC(I)	H. B. Kadasiddappa	33,845	49.93	New
JP	D. G. Basavana Gowda	31,740	46.83	New
INC	S. G. Balachandrappa	1,952	2.88	▼66.41
Margin of victory		2,105	3.11	▼35.48
Turnout		69,612	81.60	▲15.89
Total valid votes		67,780		
Rejected ballots		1,832	2.63	▲2.63
Registered electors		85,306		▲8.13
INC(I) gain from INC		Swing	▼19.36	

=== Assembly Election 1972 ===
1972 Mysore State Legislative Assembly election : Honnali
Party	Candidate	Votes	%	±%
INC	H. B. Kadasiddappa	34,803	69.29	▲20.76
INC(O)	D. Parameswarappa	15,423	30.71	New
Margin of victory		19,380	38.59	▲28.18
Turnout		51,841	65.71	▼3.29
Total valid votes		50,226		
Registered electors		78,890		▲26.31
INC hold		Swing	▲20.76	

=== Assembly Election 1967 ===
1967 Mysore State Legislative Assembly election : Honnali
Party	Candidate	Votes	%	±%
INC	D. Parameswarappa	19,045	48.53	▲9.25
Independent	H. B. Kadasiddappa	14,960	38.12	New
SSP	S. G. Halappa	5,240	13.35	New
Margin of victory		4,085	10.41	▼5.11
Turnout		43,097	69.00	▼2.82
Total valid votes		39,245		
Registered electors		62,457		▲13.30
INC gain from PSP		Swing	▼6.27	

=== Assembly Election 1962 ===
1962 Mysore State Legislative Assembly election : Honnali
Party	Candidate	Votes	%	±%
PSP	D. Parameswarappa	20,192	54.80	▲30.02
INC	H. S. Rudrappa	14,475	39.28	▼21.69
ABJS	Parameshwaraiah	2,181	5.92	New
Margin of victory		5,717	15.52	▼3.05
Turnout		39,591	71.82	▲15.00
Total valid votes		36,848		
Registered electors		55,123		▼45.48
PSP gain from INC		Swing	▲21.69	

=== Assembly Election 1957 ===
1957 Mysore State Legislative Assembly election : Honnali
Party	Candidate	Votes	%	±%
INC	H. S. Rudrappa	38,042	33.11	▼24.96
INC	A. S. Dudhya Naik	32,014	27.86	▼30.21
PSP	D. Parameswarappa	16,704	14.54	New
PSP	H. Hala Naik	11,763	10.24	New
Independent	Hanumappa	5,111	4.45	New
Independent	Chakadi Ramappa	4,250	3.70	New
Independent	R. Yellappa	3,603	3.14	New
Independent	Mallarappa	3,409	2.97	New
Margin of victory		21,338	18.57	▲2.42
Turnout		114,896	56.82	▼17.24
Total valid votes		114,896		
Registered electors		101,101		▲158.08
INC hold		Swing	▼24.96	

=== Assembly Election 1952 ===
1952 Mysore State Legislative Assembly election : Honnali
Party	Candidate	Votes	%	±%
INC	H. S. Rudrappa	16,848	58.07	New
Independent	Patnasetra Murigeppa	12,164	41.93	New
Margin of victory		4,684	16.15	
Turnout		29,012	74.06	
Total valid votes		29,012		
Registered electors		39,175		
INC win (new seat)				

== See also ==
- List of constituencies of the Karnataka Legislative Assembly
- Davanagere district
