= Agrahara Belaguli =

Agrahara Belaguli Agrahara Belaguli, Belaguli
- village
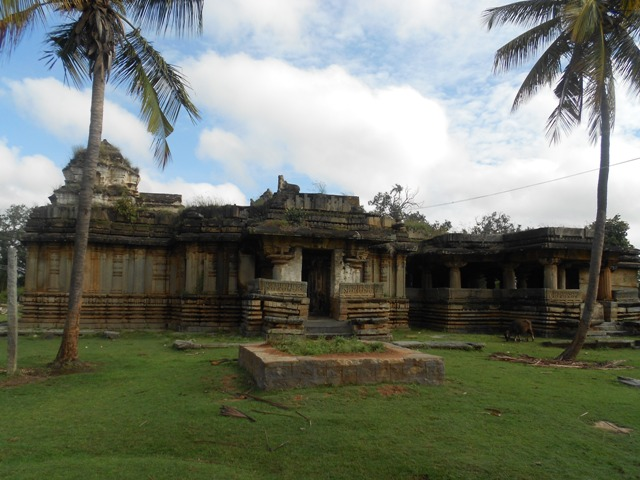
- Hoysala-era Betteshvara temple

- Location in Karnataka, India Agrahara Belaguli (India)
- Coordinates: 13°03′13.3″N 76°28′38.2″E
- Country: India
- State: Karnataka
- District: Hassan
- Talukas: Channarayapatna

Government
  - Body: Village Panchayat

Languages
  - Official: Kannada
- Time zone: UTC+5:30 (IST)
- PIN: 573131
- Telephone code: 08176
- Nearest city: Hassan, India
- Lok Sabha constituency: Shravanabelagola
- Vidhan Sabha constituency: Shravanabelagola
- Civic agency: Village Panchayat

Agrahara Belaguli is a village in Karnataka, India. It is situated about 25 km northeast from Channarayapattana in Hassan district. It was a major town before the 14th century during the Hoysala times. Early inscriptions here date from the 11th and 12th-century. Kesava Dannayaka – a general of king Vira Ballala, added several Hoysala temples dedicated to Shiva and Vishnu here in early 13th-century. He also constructed a water reservoir called Kesavasamudra. This historic water infrastructure is now to the west of the village. The village became an Agrahara who were believed to be following Shatkarmas (ADHYAYANA (Study), ADHYAAPANA (Teaching), YAJANA (Fire-Sacrifice), YAAJANA (Instructing Yajana), DAANA (Offerings/Donations), PRATIGRAHA (Receiving Daana)) in the second half of the 13th century, renamed as Kesavapura. This town was destroyed after the 13th century. Belaguli is now a small village, and most of the historic temples ruined. Of these, the Betteshvara temple – Kesavesvara temple in inscriptions survives in the most preserved form. This is a twin-temple, with two equal sanctums, one dedicated to Kesava-Vishnu and other to Isvara-Shiva. It has beautifully carved pillars and partly mutilated remains of Shaivism, Vaishnavism, Shaktism and Vedic deity relief panels.

== Attractions ==
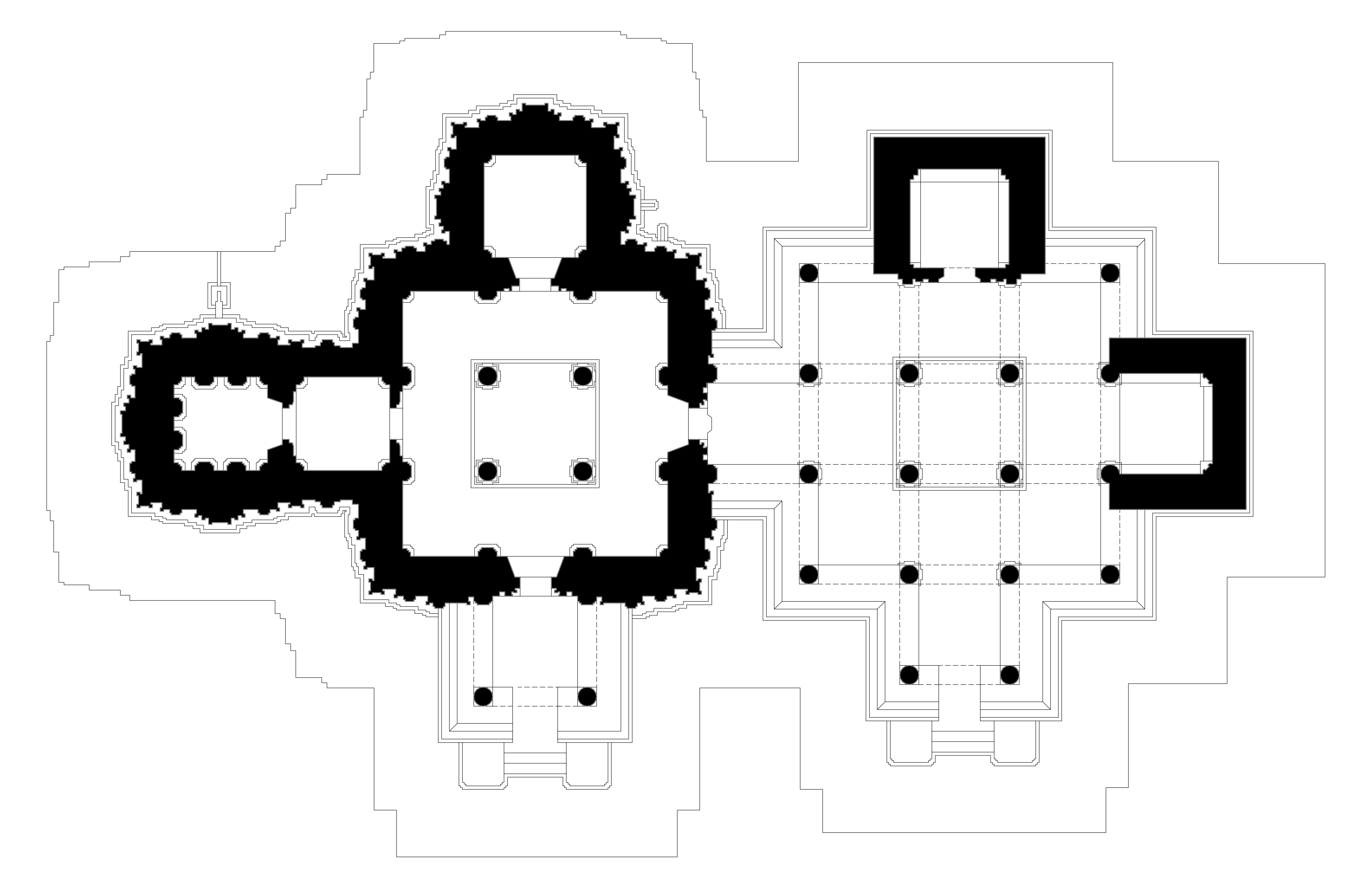
The floor plan of the Bettesvara twin temple at Agrahara Belguli

This village has a large Hoysala era twin temple, called Betteshvara temple. It is also called the Keshaveshwara temple in its inscriptions. In a poor state of maintenance, this soapstone carved historic temple integrates Shaivism and Vaishnavism themes. It has exquisitely carved statues of Saraswati, Durga Mahisasuramardini, Ganesha, Kesava, Vishnu avataras, and Nandi.

The village also has other temples, including:

- Kattappa (Ganapati) temple
- Honnadevi Devi temple
- Someshwara temple (ruined Hoysala era)

The two big tanks Honnammanakere (formerly Lakshmi Samudra) and Naachkere (formerly KeshavaSamudra) situated at the either ends of the village also have historical importance. The annual cart festival for the Village deity Honnadevi takes place every year during the spring.

== Occupation ==
The main occupation of the villagers is agriculture along with cattle rearing. Coconut farms are widely spread. The main crops grown here are Coconut, Ragi and Maize. Copra available here are of very high quality, since it lies in the Tiptur belt.

== Notable personalities ==
B.S. Jayaprakash, renowned Kannada writer and journalist, hails from this village.

== Gallery ==
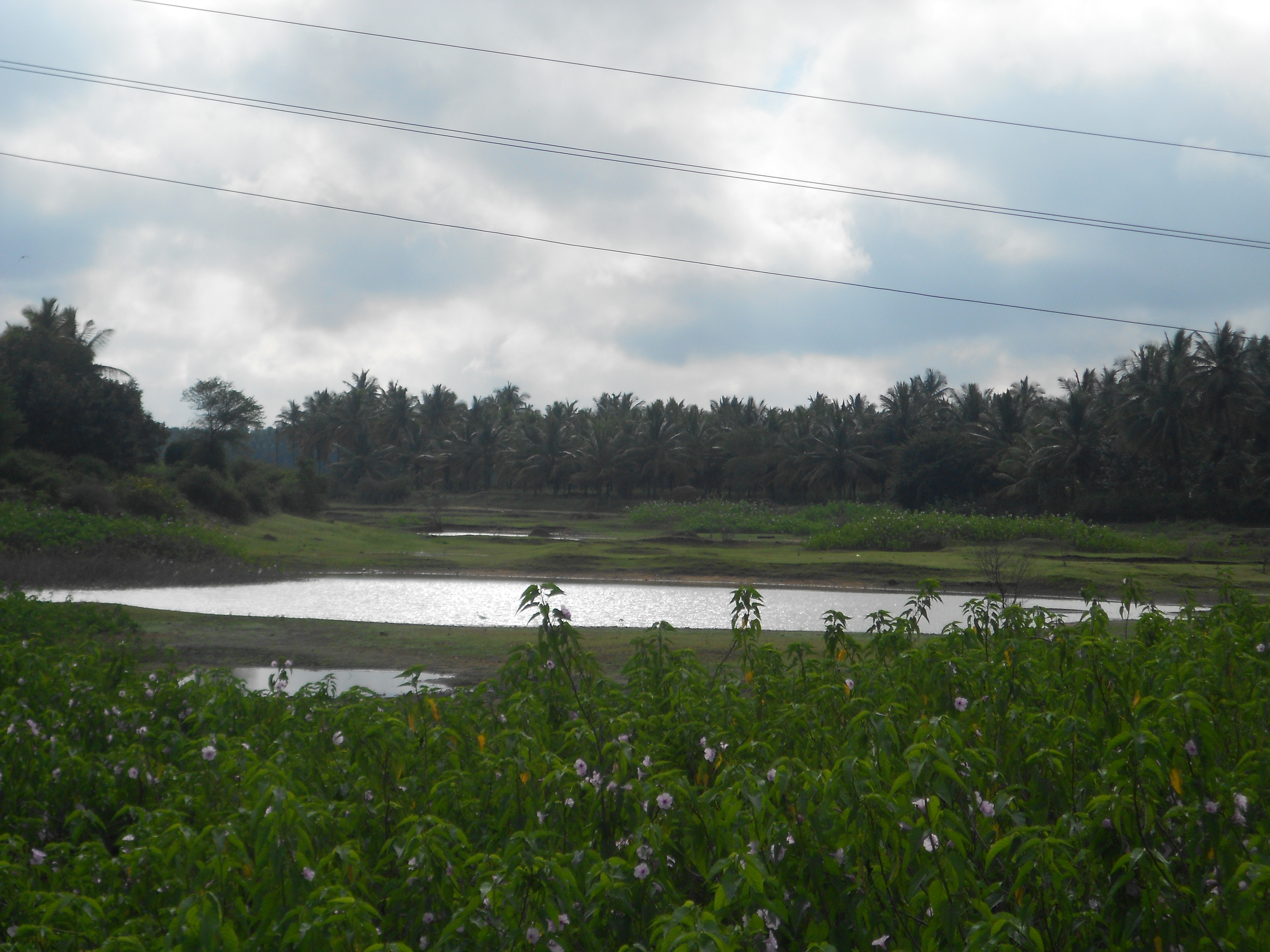

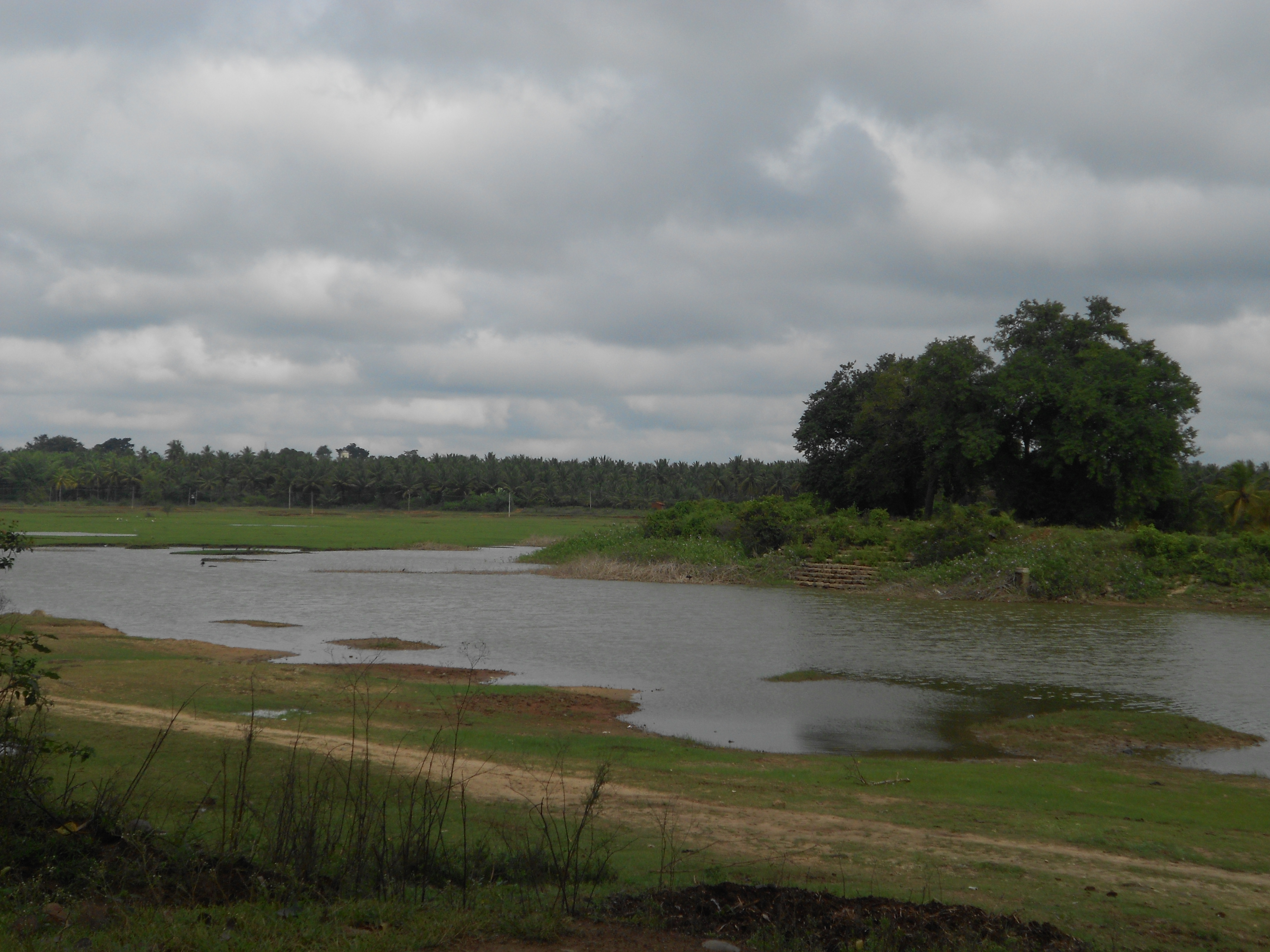

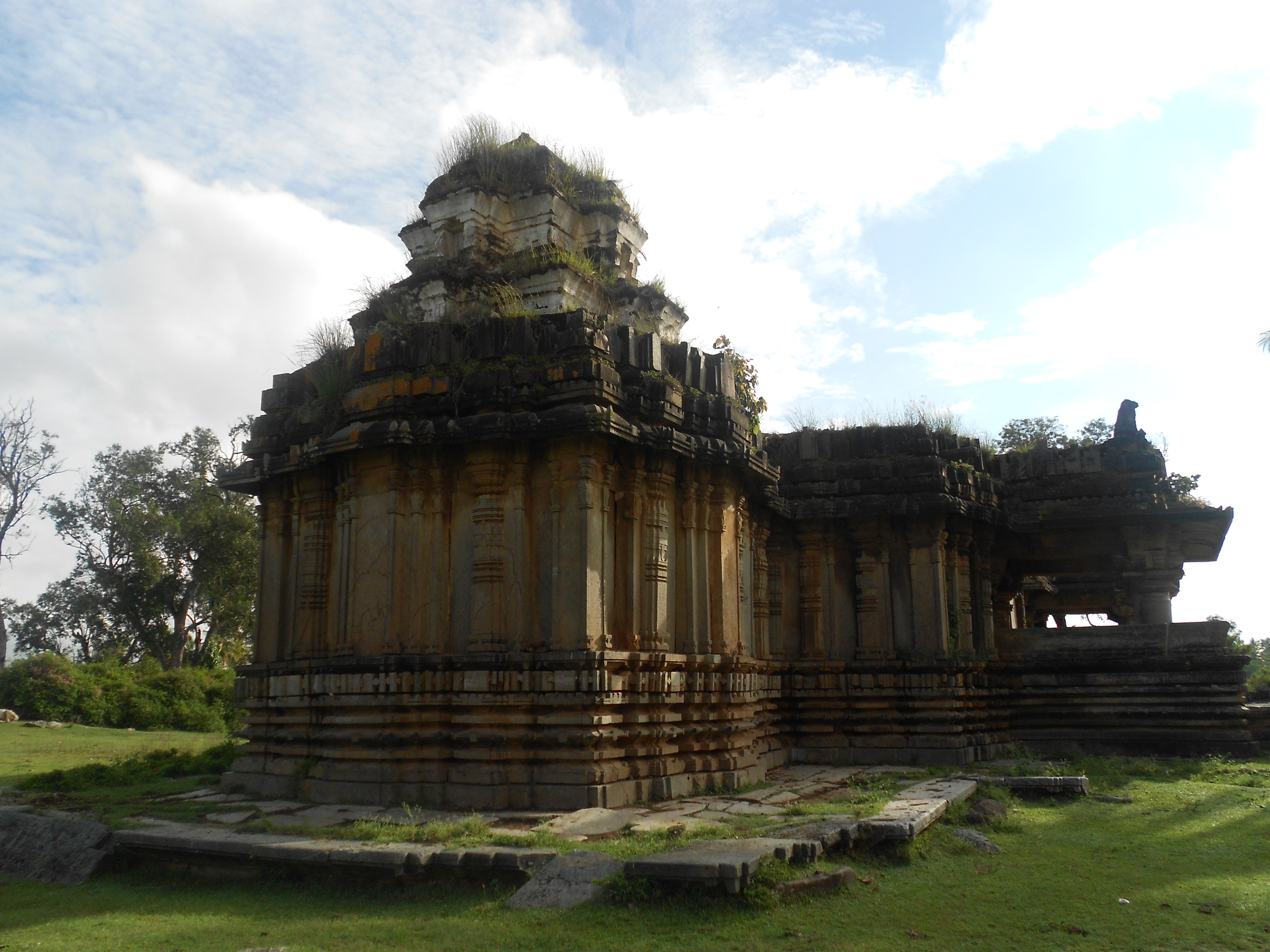

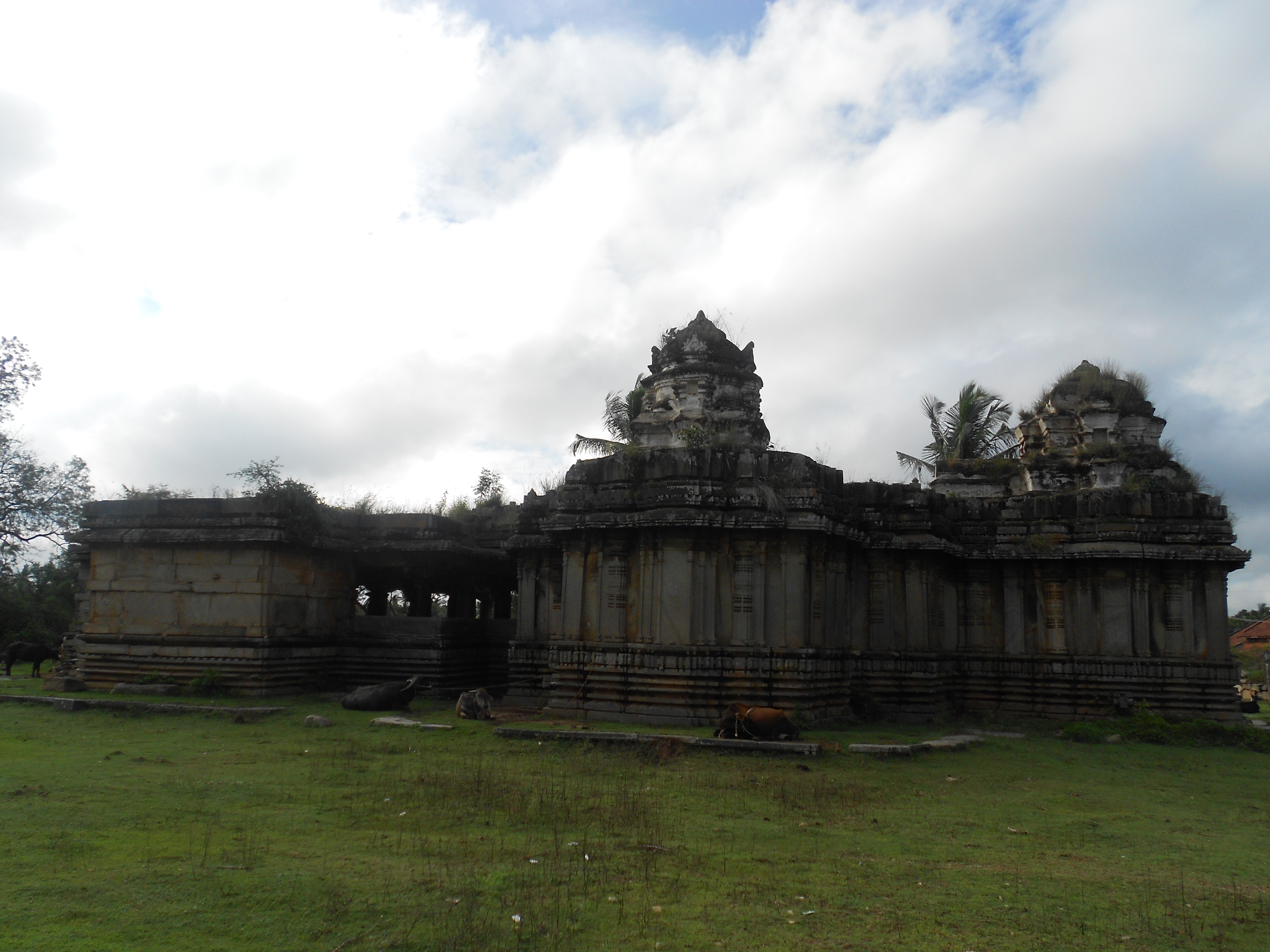

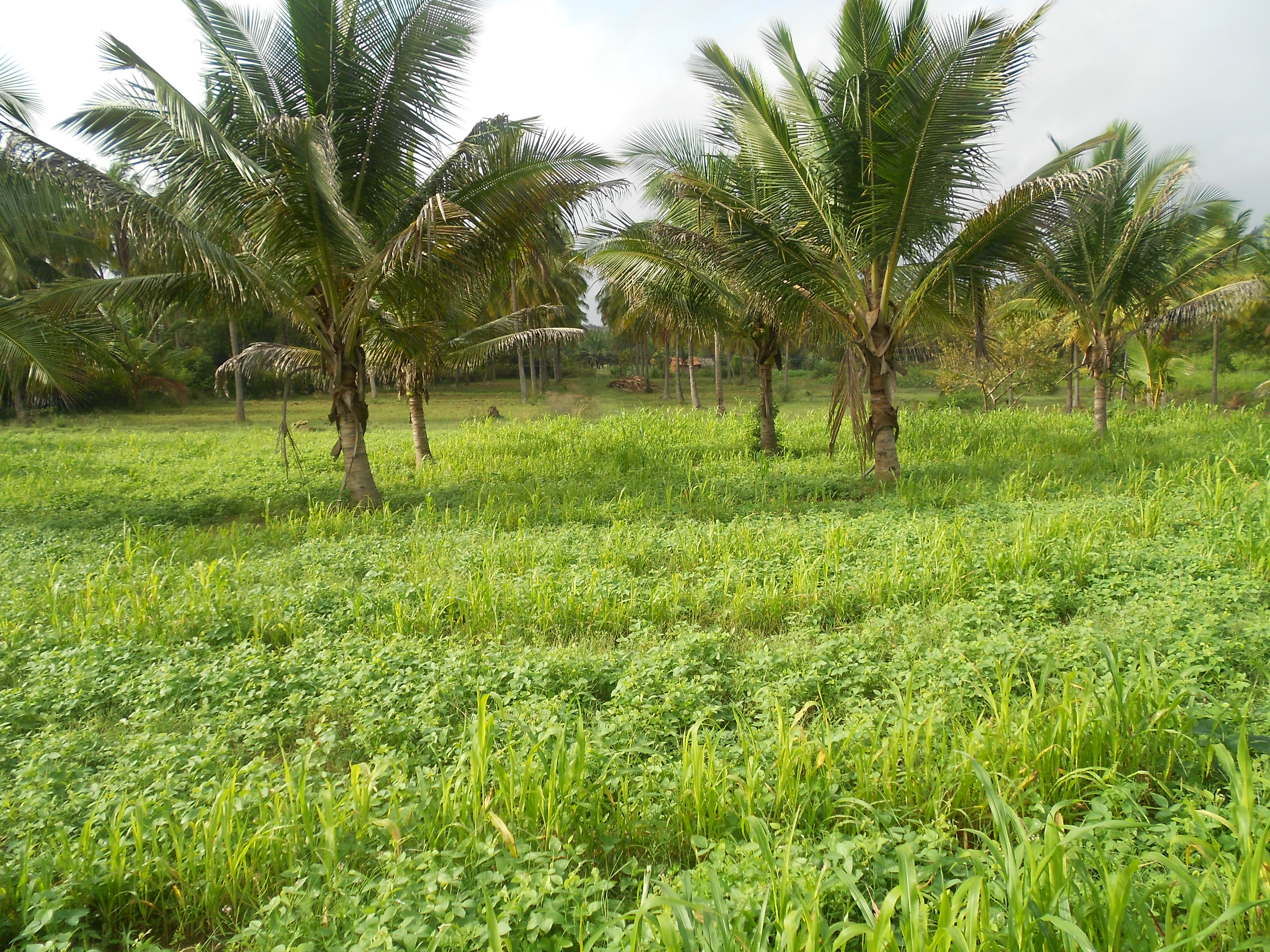

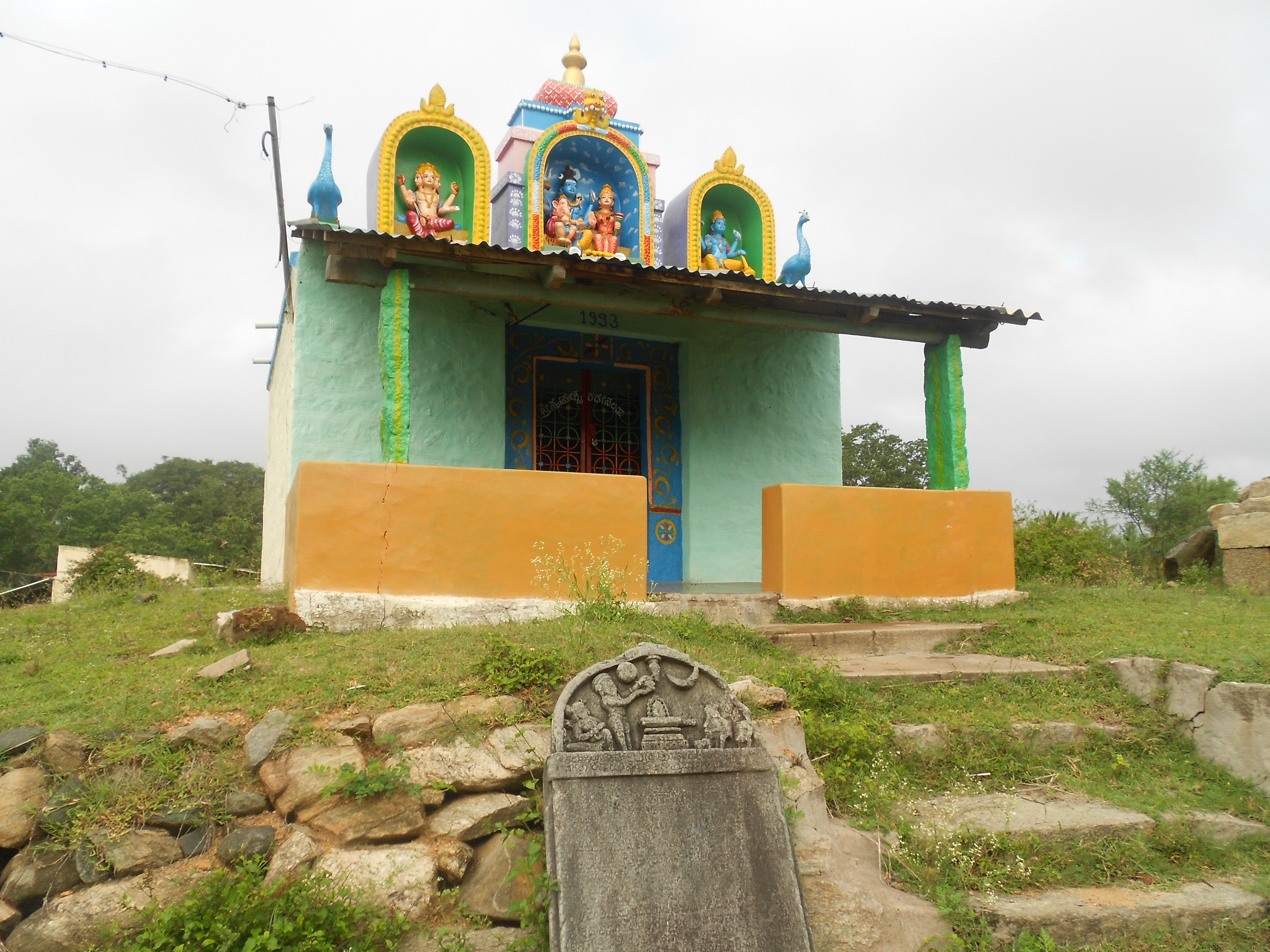

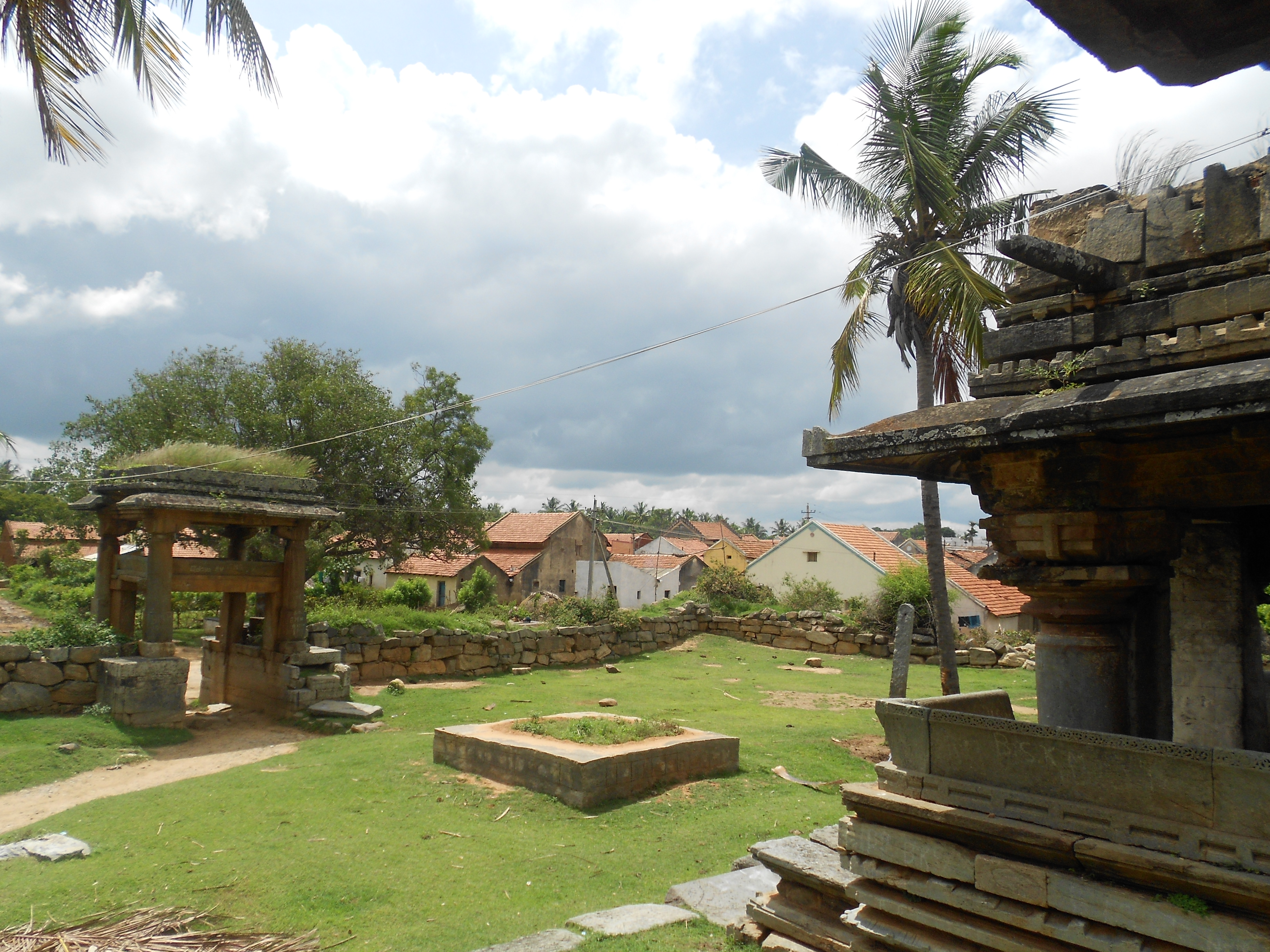

== See also ==
- Hassan
- Districts of Karnataka
