= D. B. Chandregowda =

Indian politician (1936–2023)

Minister of Law and Parliamentary Affairs, Government of Karnataka
- In office 21 January 1996 – 27 May 2004
- Preceded by: Office established
- Succeeded by: H. K. Patil

5th Speaker of the Karnataka Legislative Assembly
- In office 24 January 1983 – 17 March 1985
- Preceded by: K. H. Ranganath, INC
- Succeeded by: B. G. Banakar, JP

Member of Parliament, Lok Sabha
- In office 2009–2014
- Preceded by: H. T. Sangliana
- Succeeded by: D. V. Sadananda Gowda
- Constituency: Bangalore North

Personal details
- Born: Daradahalli Byregowda Chandregowda; 26 August 1936 Daradahalli, Mudigere taluk, Chikkamagaluru district, Mysore, India
- Died: 7 November 2023 (aged 87) Daradahalli, Mudigere taluk, Chikkamagaluru district, Karnataka, India
- Spouse: Poornachandre Gowda

Daradahalli Byregowda Chandregowda (26 August 1936 – 7 November 2023) was an Indian politician who was Speaker of Karnataka Legislative Assembly, three-term MLA, one-term MLC, and Member of Parliament—three-terms from Lok Sabha and one-term from Rajya Sabha.

Chandregowda worked as Leader of Opposition in Karnataka Legislative Assembly and Minister for Law and Parliamentary Affairs in Government of Karnataka representing several political parties in his long political career – Praja Socialist Party, Janata Dal, Congress, and Bharatiya Janata Party.

== Biography ==
Daradahalli Byregowda Chandregowda was born at Daradahalli of Mudigere taluk, Chikkamagaluru district, Karnataka on 26 August 1936 to D. A. Byre Gowda and Puttamma. He did his BSc education from Renukacharya College, Bangalore and LLB from R. L. Law College, Belgaum. He married Purna Chandre Gowda on 22 May 1966 and had four daughters.

Chandregowda learnt his leadership skills paving the way for a long political career during his college days; he was elected vice-president of the Renukacharya college students association. While at R. L. Law College, he became the General Secretary of the college student union. He was in the Praja Socialist Party till 1967. In 1971, he got elected to 5th Lok Sabha from Chikmagalur constituency representing Indian National Congress. He was re-elected to the 6th Lok Sabha from Chikmagalur, but vacated his seat later to allow Indira Gandhi to contest election from there.

Between 1978 and 1983, he became a member of Karnataka Legislative Council and worked as Cabinet minister in Government of Karnataka from 1979 to 1980. In 1980, he resigned from Congress and joined Karnataka Kranti Ranga, became President of Karnataka State Congress (U), and served as Leader of Opposition in Karnataka Legislative Council from 1980 to 1981.

Chandregowda entered into Karnataka Legislative Assembly as M.L.A. in 1983 representing Thirthahalli constituency and served as Speaker in Legislative Assembly from 1983 to 1985. In 1986, he was elected as a Member of Parliament in Rajya Sabha representing Janata Dal political party. In 1989, he was re-elected as M.L.A. from Thirthahalli constituency and became the Leader of opposition. In 1999, he was elected for a third term as M.L.A. representing Shringeri constituency and became Minister of Law and Parliamentary Affairs until 2004.

In 2008, he resigned from Congress and joined BJP; subsequently, he became a Member of Parliament in 15th Lok Sabha representing Bangalore North from BJP in 2009. In 2011, he also entered Silver screen by acting in Kannada film Nanna Gopala, produced and directed by writer "Lakshman". He was a member of the Committee on Personnel, Public Grievances, Law and Justice; Committee on Subordinate Legislation; and Committee on members of parliament Local Area Development Scheme from 2009.

D.B. Chandregowda died at his residence at Daradahalli in Mudigere taluk on 7 November 2023, at the age of 87.

== Elections contested ==
- 1971: Lok Sabha member from Chikmagalur (Congress)
- 1977: Lok Sabha member from Chikmagalur (Congress)
  - Resigned in 1978 to allow Indira Gandhi to contest and enter Lok Sabha
- 1978–1983: MLC in Karnataka Legislative Council (Congress)
  - Left Congress to join Karnataka Kranti Ranga of Devaraj Urs
- 1983–1985: M.L.A in 1983 representing Thirthahalli constituency (Janata Party)
- 1986: Rajya Sabha MP (Janata Party, later renamed Janata Dal)
- 1989: Karnataka Assembly member representing Thirthahalli constituency (Janata Dal)
- 1999: M.L.A representing Shringeri (Congress)
- 2009: Lok Sabha member from Bangalore (North) for BJP

== Autobiography ==
An autobiography of D.B. Chandre Gowda with the name Poornachandra was released on the occasion of his 75th birthday by D. V. Sadananda Gowda, former Chief Minister of Karnataka, and B. S. Yeddyurappa, former Chief Minister of Karnataka. Speaking on occasion B. S. Yeddyurappa said:

I have seen him closely. Self-confidence and stability are his virtues.

D. V. Sadananda Gowda calling him his friend, philosopher, and the guide said:

This book is not really required to be read, as a look at Gowda's personality and deeds are enough to know all about him. There are those who dream and those who strive to make that dream a reality. Gowda has always tried to do that. As a Law Minister, his invaluable input to me contributed to what I am today.

== See also ==
- List of Rajya Sabha members from Karnataka
- List of members of the 15th Lok Sabha of India
- Bangalore North (Lok Sabha constituency)
