= M. P. Renukacharya =

Indian politician and film actor

Political Secretary to the Chief Minister of Karnataka
- Incumbent
- Assumed office 30 September 2021 Serving with D. N. Jeevaraj
- Chief Minister: Basavaraj Bommai
- In office 6 September 2019 – 4 August 2021 Serving with S. R. Vishwanath; D. N. Jeevaraj
- Chief Minister: B. S. Yediyurappa

Cabinet Minister Government of Karnataka
- In office 23 September 2010 – 8 December 2012
- Ministry: Term
- Minister of Excise: 23 September 2010 - 8 December 2012

Member of Karnataka Legislative Assembly
- Incumbent
- Assumed office 2018
- Preceded by: D. G. Shantana Gowda
- Constituency: Honnali
- In office 2004–2013
- Preceded by: D. G. Shantana Gowda
- Succeeded by: D. G. Shantana Gowda
- Constituency: Honnali

Personal details
- Born: 28 February 1961 (age 65) Kundur
- Party: Bharatiya Janata Party
- Occupation: Politician

M. Panchaksarya Renukacharya is an Indian politician and film actor who is the Political Secretary to the Chief Minister of Karnataka Basavaraj Bommai. He also served as the Political Secretary to the Chief Minister B. S. Yediyurappa from 6 September 2019 to 26 July 2021. He is a current Member of Karnataka Legislative Assembly from Honnali Constituency from 2018. He is a member of the Bharatiya Janata Party. He was the former Minister for Excise in the Government of Karnataka from 2008 to 2013.
