= S. A. Ramadas =

Indian politician

Minister of State for Medical Education of Karnataka
- In office 23 September 2010 – 13 May 2013

Member of Karnataka Legislative Assembly
- In office 2018–2023
- Preceded by: M. K. Somashekhar
- Succeeded by: T. S. Srivatsa
- Constituency: Krishnaraja
- In office 2008–2013
- Preceded by: M. K. Somashekhar
- Succeeded by: M. K. Somashekhar
- Constituency: Krishnaraja
- In office 1994–2004
- Preceded by: K. M. Somasundaram
- Succeeded by: M. K. Somashekhar
- Constituency: Krishnaraja

Personal details
- Born: 4 November 1959 (age 66) Mysore
- Party: BJP
- Occupation: Politician, Social worker

S. Ashwath Narayan Rao Ramadas is an Indian politician from Karnataka. He is a four time Member of the Legislative Assembly (India) from Krishnaraja Assembly constituency in Mysore representing the Bharatiya Janata Party.

== Early life and education ==
Ramadas was born in Mysore, Karnataka. He is the son of late Ashwath Narayan Rao. He completed his Bachelor of Arts at a college affiliated with Mysore University in 1977. He heads a voluntary organisation called Aasare Foundation in Mysore.

== Career ==
Ramadas became an MLA for the first time winning the 1994 Karnataka Legislative Assembly election. In 1994, he polled 28,190 votes and defeated his nearest rival, M. Vedantha Hemmige of Janata Dal by a margin of 9,363 votes. He retained the seat for BJP winning again in the 1999 Karnataka Legislative Assembly election defeating M. K. Somashekar, also of JDS, by a margin of 9,752 votes. However, he lost the 2004 Assembly election to Somashekar.

He won again in the 2008 Assembly election defeating the same opponenet, Somashekar, by a margin of 19,422 votes. Following the historic victory of the BJP in Karnataka, he was appointed Parliamentary Secretary to the Chief Minister B. S. Yeddyurappa in May 2008. In 2010, he was appointed a Cabinet minister in the Yeddyurappa government and was entrusted with the Medical Education portfolio. He continued in the same post in the D.V. Sadananda Gowda government. He was also the district in-charge minister for Mysore district from 2008 to 2013. In 2013, he contested from Krishnaraja constituency again but lost to M. K. Somashekar, who won on INC ticket this time. However, he won the 2018 Assembly election.

In 2014, he attempted suicide after a woman named Premkumari, a widow with two children, exposed their affair to the media.
