= 1983 Karnataka Legislative Assembly election =

- 5 January 1983

All 224 seats of the Karnataka Legislative Assembly 113 seats needed for a majority
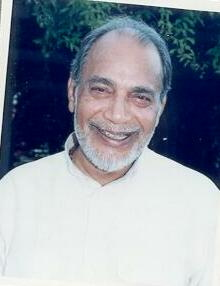

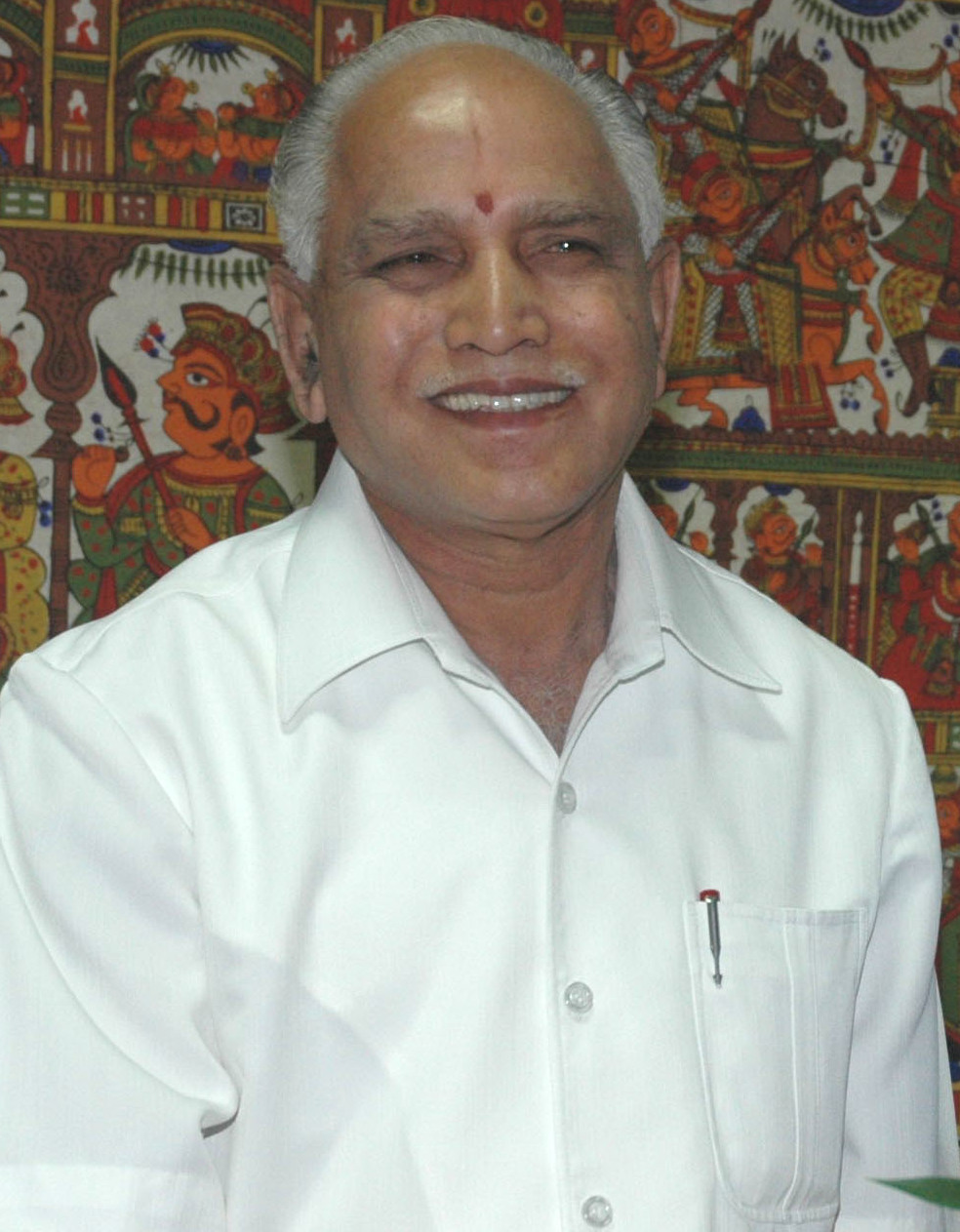
	Majority party	Minority party	Third party
Leader	Ramakrishna Hegde	R. Gundu Rao	B. S. Yeddyurappa
Party	JP	INC	BJP
Leader's seat	Did not contest	Somwarpet Assembly constituency (lost)	Shikaripura
Last election	59	149
Seats before			New
Seats won	95	82	18
Seat change	▲36	▼67	▲18
Popular vote	4,272,318	5,221,419	1,024,892
Percentage	33.07%	40.42%	7.93
Swing	▼4.88%	▼3.83%	▲7.93
Chief Minister before election
R. Gundu Rao
INC
Elected Chief Minister
Ramakrishna Hegde
JP

The 1983 Karnataka State Legislative Assembly election was held on the 5th of January 1983 in the Indian state of Karnataka to elect 224 members of the Karnataka Legislative Assembly. The elections resulted in a hung assembly with the Janata Party emerging as the single largest party winning 95 seats. Later, Janata Party leader Ramakrishna Hegde formed the first non-Congress government in Karnataka with the support of BJP and other smaller parties.

== Results ==
Summary of results of the Karnataka Legislative Assembly election, 1983
Political party	Seats contested	Seats won	Number of votes	% of votes	Seat change
Janata Party	193	95	4,272,318	33.07%	▲36
Indian National Congress	221	82	5,221,419	40.42%	▼67
Bharatiya Janata Party	110	18	1,024,892	7.93%	▲18
Communist Party of India	7	3	161,192	1.25%	Steady
Communist Party of India (Marxist)	4	3	115,320	0.89%	▲3
All India Anna Dravida Munnetra Kazhagam	1	1	16,234	0.13%	▲1
Independents	751	22	1,998,256	15.47%	▲12
Total		224	12,919,459		

=== District wise results ===
District	Seats					
District	Seats	JNP	INC	BJP	IND	OTH
Bidar	6	1	4	1	—N/a	—N/a
Gulbarga	13	6	5	1	—N/a	1
Raichur	11	1	8	—N/a	2	—N/a
Bellary	9	4	5	—N/a	—N/a	—N/a
Chitradurga	11	7	3	—N/a	—N/a	1
Tumkur	13	6	3	1	3	—N/a
Kolar	12	2	5	—N/a	3	2
Bangalore	25	20	3	—N/a	—N/a	2
Mandya	9	4	4	—N/a	1	—N/a
Mysore	16	8	5	1	2	—N/a
Kodagu	3	1	2	—N/a	—N/a	—N/a
Hassan	8	5	3	—N/a	—N/a	—N/a
Dakshina Kannada	15	3	3	8	—N/a	1
Chikmagalur	6	4	2	—N/a	—N/a	—N/a
Shimoga	10	6	1	2	1	—N/a
Uttara Kannada	6	3	2	1	—N/a	—N/a
Dharwad	18	5	8	1	4	—N/a
Belagavi	18	5	8	—N/a	5	—N/a
Bijapur	15	4	8	2	1	—N/a
Total	224	95	82	18	22	7

=== Results by constituency ===
District	Constituency		Turnout	Winner				Runner-up				Margin
District	No.	Name	%	Candidate	Party	Votes	%	Candidate	Party	Votes	%	Margin
Bidar	1	Aurad	69.38	Manik Patil	INC	28,218	42.94	Bapurao Patil	Ind	21,620	32.90	6,598
Bidar	2	Bhalki	67.56	Bheemanna Khandre	INC	32,239	61.31	Baburao Cholik	JP	20,342	38.69	11,897
Bidar	3	Hulsoor	43.49	Ramchander Veerappa	INC	17,847	49.18	Jayaraj Chature	JP	12,216	33.66	5,631
Bidar	4	Bidar	61.38	Narayan Manhalli	BJP	27,756	48.88	Mohsin Kamal	Ind	21,602	38.05	6,154
Bidar	5	Humnabad	58.95	Basavaraj Havgiappa Patil	INC	26,528	53.73	Manik Rao	BJP	14,611	29.59	11,917
Bidar	6	Basavakalyan	69.14	Basawaraj Patil	JP	27,494	44.40	S. M. Kamaloddin Nawab	Ind	14,144	22.84	13,350
Gulbarga	7	Chincholi	61.07	Devendrappa Ghalappa Jamadar	INC	19,513	38.65	Vaijnath Patil	JP	19,425	38.47	88
Gulbarga	8	Kamalapur	50.47	Govind P. Vadeyraj	INC	18,830	48.73	Shamarao Pyati	JP	13,713	35.49	5,117
Gulbarga	9	Aland	59.08	B. R. Patil	JP	19,507	44.93	B. B. Patil Okaly	INC	16,163	37.23	3,344
Gulbarga	10	Gulbarga	63.83	S. K. Kanta	JP	25,503	36.79	Quamarul Islam	Ind	23,515	33.92	1,988
Gulbarga	11	Shahabad	39.79	K. B. Shanappa	CPI	16,888	44.65	Narsing Jadhav	INC	16,590	43.86	298
Gulbarga	12	Afzalpur	59.72	Hanumantrao Desai	JP	24,648	49.01	M. Y. Patil	INC	19,390	38.55	5,258
Gulbarga	13	Chittapur	52.36	Vishawanath Patil	JP	22,096	56.10	Prabhaker Raghavendrarao	INC	12,911	32.78	9,185
Gulbarga	14	Sedam	56.74	Nagareddy Sedam	BJP	20,800	46.07	Sher Khan	INC	18,757	41.54	2,043
Gulbarga	15	Jevargi	58.59	Dharam Singh	INC	26,643	54.34	Hanumantharaya Revansiddappa	JP	16,781	34.23	9,862
Gulbarga	16	Gurmitkal	58.52	Mallikarjun Kharge	INC	30,933	67.65	B. S. Gajanana	JP	14,790	32.35	16,143
Gulbarga	17	Yadgir	58.61	Vishwanath Reddy	JP	25,606	55.38	Ishwar Kollur	INC	16,904	36.56	8,702
Gulbarga	18	Shahapur	60.79	Bapugouda	JP	31,089	56.86	Shivanna Sawoor	INC	23,583	43.14	7,506
Gulbarga	19	Shorapur	53.19	Raja Nayak	INC	26,062	53.96	Raja Naik	JP	11,177	23.14	14,885
Raichur	20	Devadurga	43.24	B. Shivanna	INC	17,251	52.67	Yellappa Rangappa	JP	13,708	41.86	3,543
Raichur	21	Raichur	53.10	Sangameshwar Sardar	JP	24,777	53.49	M. Omer	INC	20,094	43.38	4,683
Raichur	22	Kalmala	52.20	Sudhendra Kasbe	INC	19,519	48.24	Krishnamurthy	JP	16,124	39.85	3,395
Raichur	23	Manvi	58.38	Raja Naik	INC	22,235	52.51	Shiva Gouda	JP	13,635	32.20	8,600
Raichur	24	Lingsugur	54.79	Basavaraj Patil Anwari	INC	31,034	69.97	Ranghavendra Jagannath	BJP	13,321	30.03	17,713
Raichur	25	Sindhanur	60.51	Mal Lappa	Ind	27,942	49.40	R. Narayanappa	INC	25,596	45.26	2,346
Raichur	26	Kushtagi	48.63	Hanume Shekhargounda	INC	24,955	60.08	Sharbhendra Turkani	BJP	12,426	29.91	12,529
Raichur	27	Yelburga	52.67	Lingaraj Desai	INC	23,387	53.59	Shankar Deshpande	Ind	19,339	44.31	4,048
Raichur	28	Kanakagiri	38.62	Srirangadevarayalu Venkarayalu	INC	25,992	79.11	Durgadas	Ind	5,629	17.13	20,363
Raichur	29	Gangawati	52.51	H. S. Muralidhar	Ind	24,064	48.98	C. Yadawrao	INC	17,108	34.82	6,956
Raichur	30	Koppal	61.45	Mallikarajun Diwatar	INC	28,542	58.53	Shankargouda Singatalur	BJP	20,219	41.47	8,323
Bellary	31	Siruguppa	63.25	M. Shankar Reddy	INC	43,591	68.73	Mallanna Kenchanaguddada	Ind	19,062	30.05	24,529
Bellary	32	Kurugodu	59.74	Naganagouda H.	INC	22,734	46.23	Rajashekharagouda N.	Ind	20,575	41.84	2,159
Bellary	33	Bellary	58.61	M. Ramappa	JP	30,350	50.08	Raja Saheb	INC	25,876	42.70	4,474
Bellary	34	Hospet	64.04	G. Shankar Goud	INC	29,572	42.88	Gujjala Hanumanthappa	Ind	20,381	29.55	9,191
Bellary	35	Sandur	59.74	Heeroji V. S. Lad	INC	30,496	63.67	Aravind Malebennur	CPI	17,404	36.33	13,092
Bellary	36	Kudligi	64.84	K. Channabasavana Gowd	JP	24,683	48.56	N. T. Bommanna	INC	24,281	47.77	402
Bellary	37	Kottur	69.75	B. S. Veerabhadrappa	JP	34,439	61.85	M. M. J. Sadyoatha	INC	20,507	36.83	13,932
Bellary	38	Hoovina Hadagali	70.91	M. P. Prakash	JP	36,740	59.83	B. Lankeppa	INC	21,719	35.37	15,021
Bellary	39	Harapanahalli	67.95	B. H. Yanka Naik	INC	29,249	56.63	D. Seelya Naik	JP	15,532	30.07	13,717
Chitradurga	40	Harihar	73.62	Kannavara Mallappa	JP	43,196	58.21	H. Shivappa	INC	29,309	39.50	13,887
Chitradurga	41	Davanagere	74.57	Pampapathi	CPI	36,507	48.20	Mohammed Sab	Ind	17,928	23.67	18,579
Chitradurga	42	Mayakonda	68.77	K. G. Maheshwarappa	JP	32,113	51.38	H. D. Maheshwarappa	INC	25,036	40.06	7,077
Chitradurga	43	Bharamasagara	70.27	Shivamurthy K.	JP	35,163	63.74	T. Chowdaiah	INC	19,540	35.42	15,623
Chitradurga	44	Chitradurga	66.01	B. L. Gowda	JP	33,536	56.40	V. Masiyappa	INC	17,513	29.45	16,023
Chitradurga	45	Jagalur	74.68	G. H. Ashwath Reddy	INC	37,998	58.72	M. Basappa	JP	24,832	38.38	13,166
Chitradurga	46	Molakalmuru	64.45	N. G. Naik	INC	27,659	50.23	B. M. Thippeswamy	JP	19,220	34.91	8,439
Chitradurga	47	Challakere	67.85	H. C. Shivashankarappa	JP	38,146	65.20	B. K. Seetharamaiah	INC	17,149	29.31	20,997
Chitradurga	48	Hiriyur	67.39	K. H. Ranganath	INC	31,667	52.83	T. Thippanna	JP	27,069	45.16	4,598
Chitradurga	49	Holalkere	72.72	G. Shivalingappa	JP	36,050	55.36	M. B. Thipperudrappa	INC	26,637	40.91	9,413
Chitradurga	50	Hosadurga	75.15	G. Basappa	JP	39,877	57.06	M. V. Rudrappa	INC	27,913	39.94	11,964
Tumkur	51	Pavagada	68.56	Ugranarashimappa	Ind	42,274	60.70	Krishnamurthy K. B.	INC	25,285	36.30	16,989
Tumkur	52	Sira	70.84	P. Mudle Gowda	Ind	42,015	69.76	Krishnaiah S. N.	INC	14,800	24.57	27,215
Tumkur	53	Kallambella	73.17	B. Ganganna	JP	30,969	53.82	T. B. Jayachandra	INC	24,094	41.87	6,875
Tumkur	54	Bellavi	71.90	T. H. H. Anumantharayappa	INC	29,418	47.93	C. N. Bhaskarappa	JP	28,410	46.29	1,008
Tumkur	55	Madhugiri	63.03	Rajavardhan	JP	29,159	47.87	Ganga Hanumaiah	INC	28,483	46.76	676
Tumkur	56	Koratagere	70.20	C. Veeranna	JP	37,139	56.45	Mudduramaiah	INC	24,136	36.68	13,003
Tumkur	57	Tumkur	67.61	Lakshmi Narasimhaiah	JP	34,689	54.11	S. Shafi Ahmed	INC	24,159	37.68	10,530
Tumkur	58	Kunigal	72.76	Y. K. Ramaiah	JP	37,198	58.55	B. Rudraiah	INC	24,799	39.03	12,399
Tumkur	59	Huliyurdurga	76.36	N. Huchamasti Gowda	Ind	21,342	38.73	H. Boregowda	INC	16,671	30.26	4,671
Tumkur	60	Gubbi	73.82	S. Revanna	JP	29,409	49.62	Gatti Chandrasekhar	INC	20,264	34.19	9,145
Tumkur	61	Turuvekere	76.90	B. Byrappaji	INC	33,110	54.07	K. H. Ramakrishnaiah	Ind	16,423	26.82	16,687
Tumkur	62	Tiptur	72.40	S. P. Gangadharappa	INC	32,087	52.95	V. L. Sivappa	Ind	19,064	31.46	13,023
Tumkur	63	Chikkanayakanahalli	76.14	S. G. Ramalingaiah	BJP	29,614	50.98	N. Basavaiah	INC	26,243	45.18	3,371
Kolar	64	Gauribidanur	75.67	R. N. Lakshmipathi	JP	34,260	52.16	V. Krishna Rao	INC	30,426	46.32	3,834
Kolar	65	Chikballapur	70.98	A. Muniyappa	Ind	40,751	63.82	Renuka Rajendran	INC	21,823	34.18	18,928
Kolar	66	Sidlaghatta	77.76	V. Muniyappa	INC	34,757	51.54	S. Munishainappa	Ind	32,244	47.82	2,513
Kolar	67	Bagepalli	73.71	A. V. Appaswamy Reddy	CPI(M)	35,699	58.77	S. Muniraju	INC	24,137	39.74	11,562
Kolar	68	Chintamani	77.72	Chowda Reddy	INC	39,525	57.35	K. M. Krishna Reddy	JP	29,395	42.65	10,130
Kolar	69	Srinivasapur	78.73	G. K. Venkatashiva Reddy	INC	30,031	49.30	K. R. Ramesh Kumar	Ind	29,389	48.24	642
Kolar	70	Mulbagal	74.37	Beere Gowda	Ind	31,862	45.91	J. M. Reddy	INC	18,091	26.07	13,771
Kolar	71	Kolar Gold Field	64.40	M. Backthavachalam	AIADMK	16,234	35.87	T. S. Mani	CPI(M)	14,854	32.82	1,380
Kolar	72	Bethamangala	58.27	C. Venkateshappa	INC	20,253	38.86	Lakshmamma Narayanaraju	Ind	20,152	38.67	101
Kolar	73	Kolar	72.90	K. R. Shrinivasaiah	JP	39,005	64.88	Naseer Ahmed	INC	19,250	32.02	19,755
Kolar	74	Vemagal	78.77	C. Byre Gowda	Ind	48,061	71.88	Muniyappa K.	INC	14,154	21.17	33,907
Kolar	75	Malur	71.08	A. Nagaraju	INC	23,371	43.12	H. B. Dyavarappa	Ind	18,235	33.64	5,136
Bangalore	76	Malleshwaram	61.05	P. Ramdev	JP	43,083	66.02	K. V. Achar	INC	14,483	22.20	28,600
Bangalore	77	Rajaji Nagar	62.64	M. S. Krishnan	CPI	54,467	54.91	H. D. Gangaraj	INC	18,964	19.12	35,503
Bangalore	78	Gandhi Nagar	63.23	M. S. Narayana Rao	JP	28,604	54.69	Hariprasad B. K.	INC	19,511	37.30	9,093
Bangalore	79	Chickpet	62.81	A. Lakshmisagar	JP	26,113	57.08	M. V. Thiwary	INC	14,692	32.12	11,421
Bangalore	80	Binnypet	63.52	G. Narayana Kumar	JP	41,291	45.33	I. P. D. Salappa	INC	17,187	18.87	24,104
Bangalore	81	Chamrajpet	11.65	M. Obanna Raju	JP	17,455	36.18	S. Pramila	INC	9,553	19.80	7,902
Bangalore	82	Basavanagudi	62.10	H. L. Thimme Gowda	JP	32,567	45.32	S. B. Swethadri	BJP	21,108	29.37	11,459
Bangalore	83	Jayanagar	55.24	M. Chandrasekhar	JP	37,687	53.96	Mallur Rao	INC	19,381	27.75	18,306
Bangalore	84	Shanti Nagar	56.68	P. D. Govinda Raj	JP	29,404	59.90	P. K. Ranganathan	INC	15,142	30.85	14,262
Bangalore	85	Shivajinagar	56.91	M. Raghupathy	JP	21,319	54.81	C. M. Ibrahim	INC	13,792	35.46	7,527
Bangalore	86	Bharathinagar	60.38	Michael Fernandes	JP	20,369	40.50	K. J. George	INC	15,285	30.39	5,084
Bangalore	87	Jayamahal	60.85	Jeevaraj Alva	JP	35,622	60.92	S. Hameed Shah	INC	19,407	33.19	16,215
Bangalore	88	Yelahanka	61.44	V. Sreenivasan	JP	43,851	55.98	B. Basavalingappa	INC	31,783	40.58	12,068
Bangalore	89	Uttarahalli	62.02	M. Srinivas	JP	52,175	50.60	C. Narayana Reddy	INC	44,018	42.69	8,157
Bangalore	90	Varthur	65.49	S. Suryanarayana Rao	CPI(M)	48,344	59.08	B. V. Ramachandra Reddy	INC	28,533	34.87	19,811
Bangalore	91	Kanakapura	76.49	P. G. R. Sindhia	JP	37,467	58.46	C. Appaji	INC	24,603	38.39	12,864
Bangalore	92	Sathanur	74.38	K. G. Srinivasa Murthy	JP	38,723	61.60	V. C. Siyaramu	INC	21,921	34.87	16,802
Bangalore	93	Channapatna	74.74	M. Varade Gowda	JP	36,910	52.23	T. V. Krishnappa	INC	31,094	44.00	5,816
Bangalore	94	Ramanagara	80.23	C. Boraiah	JP	45,076	62.02	A. K. Abdul Samad	INC	26,200	36.05	18,876
Bangalore	95	Magadi	71.60	H. G. Channappa	INC	30,947	47.67	T. A. Rangaiah	JP	29,277	45.10	1,670
Bangalore	96	Nelamangala	66.22	Sathyanarayana M. G.	JP	28,185	56.14	Anjana Murthy	INC	18,769	37.39	9,416
Bangalore	97	Doddaballapur	75.21	R. L. Jalappa	JP	39,896	56.03	Gurujappa K. C.	INC	26,316	36.96	13,580
Bangalore	98	Devanahalli	72.07	Mariyappa A. M.	JP	37,462	53.07	Venkatappa M.	INC	31,991	45.32	5,471
Bangalore	99	Hosakote	78.15	N. Chikke Gowda	INC	47,822	61.09	S. N. Thabasappa	JP	27,425	35.04	20,397
Bangalore	100	Anekal	68.61	Y. Ramakrishna	INC	31,021	47.28	B. Allallappa	BJP	24,494	37.33	6,527
Mandya	101	Nagamangala	77.41	Chigarigowda	Ind	36,966	59.03	H. T. Krishnappa	INC	15,332	24.48	21,634
Mandya	102	Maddur	76.55	M. Manchegowda	INC	33,600	50.99	T. Channegowda	Ind	19,758	29.98	13,842
Mandya	103	Kirugavalu	81.73	G. Made Gowda	INC	36,310	55.92	Rame Gowda	JP	25,454	39.20	10,856
Mandya	104	Malavalli	71.86	Somasekhar	JP	31,966	51.51	M. Madaiah	INC	25,345	40.84	6,621
Mandya	105	Mandya	71.04	B. Dodda Boregowda	JP	37,984	57.66	Sadath Khan	INC	26,335	39.98	11,649
Mandya	106	Keragodu	81.41	H. D. Chowdiah	INC	32,483	54.64	K. V. Shankara Gowda	JP	26,966	45.36	5,517
Mandya	107	Shrirangapattana	76.43	A. S. Bandisiddegowda	JP	36,634	57.78	M. Srinivas	INC	25,843	40.76	10,791
Mandya	108	Pandavapura	73.81	K. Kempegowda	JP	29,030	45.55	K. M. Kengegowda	INC	22,371	35.10	6,659
Mandya	109	Krishnarajpete	72.84	M. Puttaswamy Gowda	INC	31,499	51.81	Krishna	JP	25,766	42.38	5,733
Mysore	110	Hanur	73.27	K. P. Shantamurthy	INC	31,357	45.91	G. Raju Gouda	Ind	29,951	43.85	1,406
Mysore	111	Kollegal	64.83	B. Basavaiah	JP	28,485	51.40	K. Shivasankaraiah	INC	18,779	33.88	9,706
Mysore	112	Bannur	78.53	T. P. Boraiah	Ind	30,982	48.16	K. Made Gowda	INC	24,957	38.80	6,025
Mysore	113	T. Narasipur	65.91	V. Vasudeva	JP	28,817	53.09	Venkataramana P.	INC	18,398	33.89	10,419
Mysore	114	Krishnaraja	58.56	N. H. Gangadhara	BJP	21,163	48.93	T. V. Srinivasa Rao	JP	9,116	21.07	12,047
Mysore	115	Chamaraja	57.85	H. Kempegowda	JP	23,967	48.35	Puttegowda	BJP	11,932	24.07	12,035
Mysore	116	Narasimharaja	56.27	Azeez Sait	JP	26,576	51.26	R. Q. Arshad	INC	17,512	33.78	9,064
Mysore	117	Chamundeshwari	69.16	Siddaramaiah	Ind	26,614	43.33	D. Jayadevaraja Urs	INC	23,110	37.63	3,504
Mysore	118	Nanjangud	64.51	M. Mahadev	INC	19,124	38.62	K. Narasegowda	JP	19,079	38.53	45
Mysore	119	Santhemarahalli	63.72	B. Rachaiah	JP	30,954	59.26	M. Shivanna	INC	17,922	34.31	13,032
Mysore	120	Chamarajanagar	72.43	S. Puttaswamy	INC	34,607	47.51	Vatal Nagaraj	Ind	28,690	39.39	5,917
Mysore	121	Gundlupet	78.82	K. S. Nagarathnamma	INC	44,085	62.45	H. N. Srikanta Shetty	JP	25,427	36.02	18,658
Mysore	122	Heggadadevankote	67.94	H. B. Chaluvaiah	JP	33,840	54.31	Susheela	INC	13,652	21.91	20,188
Mysore	123	Hunasuru	75.29	Chandraprabha Urs	JP	50,951	74.10	Prema Kumar H. N.	INC	15,363	22.34	35,588
Mysore	124	Krishnarajanagara	80.29	S. Nanjappa	JP	35,896	54.39	Viswanath H.	INC	28,546	43.26	7,350
Mysore	125	Periyapatna	73.37	K. S. Kalamarigowda	INC	23,338	33.91	C. Ramaraje Urs	JP	16,807	24.42	6,531
Kodagu	126	Virajpet	53.65	G. K. Subhaiah	INC	22,581	54.38	Paniyeravara P. Choma	BJP	14,009	33.73	8,572
Kodagu	127	Madikeri	63.91	M. C. Nanaiah	INC	20,762	40.00	Chengapa M. M.	BJP	15,030	28.95	5,732
Kodagu	128	Somwarpet	70.42	B. A. Jivijaya	JP	31,544	52.66	R. Gundu Rao	INC	26,162	43.67	5,382
Hassan	129	Belur	64.25	D. Mallesha	JP	25,648	50.67	S. H. Puttaranganath	INC	19,806	39.13	5,842
Hassan	130	Arsikere	68.25	G. S. Basavaraju	INC	32,877	51.43	D. B. Gangadharappa	Ind	19,095	29.87	13,782
Hassan	131	Gandasi	73.11	B. Nanjappa	JP	32,433	53.61	Haranahalli Ramaswamy	INC	18,736	30.97	13,697
Hassan	132	Shravanabelagola	75.12	H. C. Srikantaiah	INC	41,164	55.26	N. Gangadhar	JP	29,662	39.82	11,502
Hassan	133	Holenarasipur	80.98	H. D. Deve Gowda	JP	37,239	54.54	K. Kumaraswamy	INC	28,158	41.24	9,081
Hassan	134	Arkalgud	68.34	K. B. Mallappa	JP	33,927	59.85	B. N. Puttegowda	INC	22,225	39.21	11,702
Hassan	135	Hassan	63.48	B. V. Kari Gowda	JP	24,911	39.47	K. H. Hanume Gowda	INC	20,952	33.20	3,959
Hassan	136	Sakleshpur	61.65	J. D. Somappa	INC	25,778	41.89	M. P. Nanjunath	BJP	21,253	34.54	4,525
Dakshina Kannada	137	Sullia	66.50	Bakila Hukrappa	BJP	21,975	42.64	N. Sheena	INC	15,426	29.93	6,549
Dakshina Kannada	138	Puttur	71.94	K. Rama Bhat	BJP	26,618	45.63	B. Sankappa Rai	INC	25,189	43.18	1,429
Dakshina Kannada	139	Vittal	72.99	A. Rukmayya Poojari	BJP	22,277	37.90	B. Shivarama Shetty	INC	14,779	25.14	7,498
Dakshina Kannada	140	Belthangady	71.89	K. Vasantha Bangera	BJP	35,579	62.16	K. Gangadhara Gowda	INC	21,660	37.84	13,919
Dakshina Kannada	141	Bantval	68.17	N. Shiva Rao	BJP	17,690	38.12	K. P. Abdulla	INC	14,217	30.63	3,473
Dakshina Kannada	142	Mangalore	69.92	V. Dhananjay Kumar	BJP	22,909	44.80	P. F. Rodrigues	INC	19,062	37.28	3,847
Dakshina Kannada	143	Ullal	67.23	P. Ramachandra Rao	CPI(M)	16,423	32.44	K. S. Mohammed Massod	INC	13,903	27.46	2,520
Dakshina Kannada	144	Surathkal	64.66	Lokayya Shetty	JP	29,082	61.83	N. M. Adyanthaya	INC	17,951	38.17	11,131
Dakshina Kannada	145	Kapu	66.15	Vasanth V. Salian	INC	22,839	50.58	Gangadhara	BJP	16,442	36.41	6,397
Dakshina Kannada	146	Udupi	70.05	V. S. Acharya	BJP	26,385	49.30	M. Manorama Madhavaraj	INC	23,146	43.25	3,239
Dakshina Kannada	147	Brahmavar	68.92	B. B. Shetty	BJP	27,504	47.75	P. Basavaraj	INC	26,550	46.09	954
Dakshina Kannada	148	Kundapura	69.50	K. Prathapachandra Shetty	INC	32,469	54.89	Mani Gopal	JP	25,197	42.59	7,272
Dakshina Kannada	149	Byndoor	66.83	Appanna Hegde B.	JP	25,771	49.26	G. S. Achar	INC	25,747	49.22	24
Dakshina Kannada	150	Karkala	69.65	Veerappa Moily	INC	26,176	51.85	M. K. Vijaya Kumar	BJP	20,272	40.16	5,904
Dakshina Kannada	151	Moodabidri	68.90	Amarnatha Sheety K.	JP	24,433	55.39	Devdas Kattemar	INC	19,676	44.61	4,757
Chikmagalur	152	Sringeri	67.32	H. G. Govinde Gowda	JP	30,270	54.67	B. Ramaiah Begane	INC	24,349	43.97	5,921
Chikmagalur	153	Mudigere	53.45	P. Thippaiah	JP	20,830	48.46	C. Motamma	INC	20,111	46.79	719
Chikmagalur	154	Chikmagalur	60.14	H. A. Narayana Gowda	JP	26,766	58.65	K. R. Hiriyanna Gowda	INC	17,134	37.55	9,632
Chikmagalur	155	Birur	67.78	S. R. Lakshmaiah	JP	23,698	47.27	K. S. Mallikarjuna Pasanna	INC	23,158	46.19	540
Chikmagalur	156	Kadur	71.52	N. K. Hutchappa	INC	15,223	28.52	K. M. Krishnamurthy	Ind	13,563	25.41	1,660
Chikmagalur	157	Tarikere	73.09	H. R. Raju	INC	38,516	61.97	T. H. Shivashankarappa	JP	21,809	35.09	16,707
Shimoga	158	Channagiri	71.56	J. H. Patel	JP	34,571	55.09	N. G. Halappa	INC	28,188	44.91	6,383
Shimoga	159	Holehonnur	64.07	G. Basavannappa	JP	30,056	52.24	K. G. Chenna Naik	INC	25,413	44.17	4,643
Shimoga	160	Bhadravati	71.35	Salera S. Siddappa	JP	34,576	49.25	D. Mnjappa	INC	26,343	37.52	8,233
Shimoga	161	Honnali	81.02	D. G. Basavana Gowda	Ind	41,672	54.36	M. Lakshmana	JP	19,352	25.24	22,320
Shimoga	162	Shimoga	69.33	M. Ananda Rao	BJP	25,475	35.11	M. C. Maheswarappa	JP	22,211	30.61	3,264
Shimoga	163	Tirthahalli	68.78	D. B. Chandregowda	JP	21,442	36.89	Kadilal Divakar	INC	19,071	32.81	2,371
Shimoga	164	Hosanagar	70.84	B. Swamy Rao	JP	29,542	51.42	S. M. Sheeranaly Chandrashrkhar	INC	20,143	35.06	9,399
Shimoga	165	Sagar	67.98	L. T. Toimmappa Hegde	INC	20,895	37.13	K. G. Shivappa	JP	19,229	34.17	1,666
Shimoga	166	Soraba	79.61	Sarekoppa Bangarappa	JP	37,081	64.33	Kagodu Thimmappa	INC	20,559	35.67	16,522
Shimoga	167	Shikaripura	73.74	B. S. Yediyurappa	BJP	40,687	64.20	K. Yenkatappa	INC	18,504	29.20	22,183
Uttara Kannada	168	Sirsi	68.57	Gopal Kanade	JP	23,540	40.42	Shankar Revankar	INC	18,575	31.89	4,965
Uttara Kannada	169	Bhatkal	69.60	Rama Naik	JP	30,119	52.05	Yahya Umar	INC	27,746	47.95	2,373
Uttara Kannada	170	Kumta	63.98	Karki M. P.	BJP	21,004	37.29	Seetaram Nayak	INC	19,026	33.78	1,978
Uttara Kannada	171	Ankola	64.18	Shripad Hegde	INC	16,379	34.12	Anasuya Kallal	JP	13,479	28.08	2,900
Uttara Kannada	172	Karwar	61.72	Prabhakar Rane	INC	21,657	42.28	Mota Naik	Ind	12,123	23.67	9,534
Uttara Kannada	173	Haliyal	71.10	R. V. Deshpande	JP	41,926	58.64	Virupaksh Ghadi	INC	29,065	40.65	12,861
Dharwad	174	Dharwad Rural	69.08	Channabasappa Pudakalakatti	INC	30,240	56.00	M. A. Contractor	JP	21,946	40.64	8,294
Dharwad	175	Dharwad	67.73	Morey S. R.	INC	17,991	31.21	Chandrakant Bellad	JP	17,859	30.98	132
Dharwad	176	Hubli City	64.08	Mahadevsa Jaratarghar	BJP	22,938	40.80	Abdularahiman Mudhol	CPI	18,424	32.77	4,514
Dharwad	177	Hubli Rural	66.69	S. R. Bommai	JP	31,644	49.38	Rachappa Wali	INC	22,341	34.86	9,303
Dharwad	178	Kalghatgi	70.99	Jacob Pallipurathu	Ind	23,664	46.56	Shivanagouda Patil	INC	23,168	45.58	496
Dharwad	179	Kundgol	67.19	Veerappa Kubihal	INC	28,848	54.43	Shankargouda Mulkipatil	JP	22,489	42.43	6,359
Dharwad	180	Shiggaon	65.42	Mohammed Nadaf	INC	26,801	48.12	Hanamanatagoud Patil	JP	24,250	43.54	2,551
Dharwad	181	Hangal	78.40	C. M. Udasi	Ind	35,617	56.56	Manohar Tahasildar	INC	25,565	40.60	10,052
Dharwad	182	Hirekerur	71.37	Basavannappa Gadlappa	Ind	32,268	51.17	Shankarrao Gubbi	INC	27,517	43.64	4,751
Dharwad	183	Ranibennur	73.12	Basanagouda Patil	JP	36,395	54.41	Maradeppa Karur	Ind	13,302	19.88	23,093
Dharwad	184	Byadgi	62.84	Heggappa Lamani	INC	20,377	42.42	Kallokappa Beelagi	JP	13,488	28.08	6,889
Dharwad	185	Haveri	68.83	Chittaranjan Kalakoti	JP	33,316	53.63	Rajashekhar Girji	INC	26,813	43.16	6,503
Dharwad	186	Shirahatti	69.65	Gulappa Upanal	Ind	25,825	49.14	Narayan Kulkarni	INC	20,540	39.08	5,285
Dharwad	187	Mundargi	67.94	Kuberappa Kurudigi	INC	23,264	45.91	Nagappa Humbarwadi	Ind	19,784	39.04	3,480
Dharwad	188	Gadag	61.42	Chanaveerayya Muttinapendimath	INC	25,104	45.94	Hanamantagouda Desai	JP	20,697	37.88	4,407
Dharwad	189	Ron	66.17	Jananadev Doddameti	JP	31,721	59.10	Veerabhadrappa Muthikatti	INC	20,979	39.09	10,742
Dharwad	190	Nargund	63.52	B. R. Yavagal	JP	22,675	55.02	B. R. Patil	INC	14,156	34.35	8,519
Dharwad	191	Navalgund	60.42	Mallappa Kulkarni	INC	25,524	56.43	Nemachandra Desai	JP	13,857	30.63	11,667
Belagavi	192	Ramdurg	57.59	Fakirappa Koppad	INC	31,688	64.78	Ramesh Gouroji	JP	11,877	24.28	19,811
Belagavi	193	Parasgad	67.59	Ramanagouda Patil	INC	28,126	45.71	Yallappa Nugganatti	JP	26,053	42.34	2,073
Belagavi	194	Bailhongal	72.63	Ramalingappa Balekundargi	INC	30,957	56.44	Veerappa Deyannavar	JP	23,159	42.22	7,798
Belagavi	195	Kittur	77.11	D. B. Inamdar	JP	34,866	56.06	Mugatsaheb Naghnoor	INC	24,894	40.03	9,972
Belagavi	196	Khanapur	74.93	Vasantrao Patil	Ind	40,633	61.60	Masnu Ambadagatti	INC	16,501	25.02	24,132
Belagavi	197	Belagavi City	80.30	Rajabhau Mane	Ind	42,763	54.06	Surendra Doddannavar	INC	30,159	38.12	12,604
Belagavi	198	Uchagaon	76.37	Basavant Patil	Ind	41,940	56.94	Parashuram Nandihalli	INC	28,544	38.75	13,396
Belagavi	199	Hire Bagewadi	71.75	Govind Astekar	Ind	21,333	37.20	Ninganagouda Patil	JP	16,981	29.61	4,352
Belagavi	200	Gokak	63.99	Mallappa Muttennavar	JP	26,258	49.72	Laxman Naik	INC	23,253	44.03	3,005
Belagavi	201	Arabhavi	62.14	Veeranna Koujalgi	INC	32,974	57.61	Shidlingappa Gotadki	JP	9,125	15.94	23,849
Belagavi	202	Hukkeri	66.04	Alagoud Desai	INC	20,855	44.29	Shivayogi Janashetti	JP	20,034	42.55	821
Belagavi	203	Sankeshwar	72.15	Malhargouda Patil	INC	27,335	48.03	Lakmappa Khot	JP	26,965	47.38	370
Belagavi	204	Nippani	69.86	Balasaheb Shinde	Ind	21,658	38.13	Subhash Joshi	Ind	18,043	31.76	3,615
Belagavi	205	Sadalga	73.05	Ajitsingh Nimbalkar	INC	31,114	53.65	Malagouda Patil	Ind	25,076	43.24	6,038
Belagavi	206	Chikkodi	62.78	Parashuram Hegre	JP	22,446	46.47	Shidram Chikodi	INC	21,817	45.17	629
Belagavi	207	Raibag	71.91	Shravana Kamble	JP	31,365	50.72	Rama Nadoni	INC	28,071	45.40	3,294
Belagavi	208	Kagwad	72.21	V. L. Patil	JP	35,007	62.58	Annarao Jakanur	INC	20,933	37.42	14,074
Belagavi	209	Athani	55.33	Dhairyashil Pawar	INC	24,336	48.61	Alagouda Kage	JP	19,795	39.54	4,541
Bijapur	210	Jamkhandi	72.46	Gurupadappa Bagalkot	JP	41,445	57.08	B. D. Jatti	INC	17,580	24.21	23,865
Bijapur	211	Bilgi	62.32	Siddanagoud Patil	INC	27,413	50.56	Pampakevi Belagali	JP	13,273	24.48	14,140
Bijapur	212	Mudhol	64.58	Ashok Kattimani	INC	30,713	60.35	Surendra Kale	Ind	15,204	29.87	15,509
Bijapur	213	Bagalkot	70.44	Goolappa Mantur	Ind	25,213	42.34	Parappa Kalligudd	INC	17,364	29.16	7,849
Bijapur	214	Badami	66.65	B. B. Chimmanakatti	INC	27,336	50.88	Ravasaheb Desai	Ind	24,360	45.34	2,976
Bijapur	215	Guledgud	64.76	Mallikarjun Banni	BJP	23,166	43.83	Basanagouda Janali	INC	22,640	42.83	526
Bijapur	216	Hungund	63.96	Shivasangappa Kadapatti	JP	27,254	56.62	Shivayya Patil	INC	19,286	40.07	7,968
Bijapur	217	Muddebihal	67.43	Jagadevarao Deshmukh	JP	21,885	46.74	Ramarao Bhagawant	Ind	9,530	20.35	12,355
Bijapur	218	Huvina Hippargi	66.76	Basanagoud Patil	INC	30,320	58.74	Basanagoud Patil	JP	17,872	34.63	12,448
Bijapur	219	Basavana Bagevadi	59.93	Somanagouda Patil	INC	34,386	68.82	Rajashekhar Pattanashetti	BJP	15,577	31.18	18,809
Bijapur	220	Tikota	65.37	M. B. Patil	INC	27,884	58.31	Basagond Kotihal	JP	18,092	37.84	9,792
Bijapur	221	Bijapur	59.66	Chandrashekar Gachinmath	BJP	28,795	50.31	Sayed Jahagirdar	INC	24,974	43.64	3,821
Bijapur	222	Ballolli	59.97	Ramesh Jigajinagi	JP	24,603	50.26	Siddharth Arakeri	INC	11,876	24.26	12,727
Bijapur	223	Indi	55.50	Revanasiddappa Kallur	INC	24,132	50.81	Basanagouda Patil	Ind	11,098	23.37	13,034
Bijapur	224	Sindagi	54.15	Ninganagoud Patil	INC	25,778	52.08	Mallanagouda Biradar	JP	18,788	37.96	6,990
