= Haveri Lok Sabha constituency =

Lok Sabha constituency in Karnataka

Coordinates: 14.80°N 75.40°E

Haveri
- Lok Sabha constituency
- Haveri Lok Sabha Constituency Map

Constituency details
- Country: India
- Region: South India
- State: Karnataka
- Assembly constituencies: (District = Gadag) Shirahatti(SC); Gadag; Ron (District = Haveri) Hangal; Haveri(SC); Byadgi; Hirekerur; Ranibennur
- Established: 2008
- Total electors: 17,06,917
- Reservation: None

Member of Parliament
- 18th Lok Sabha
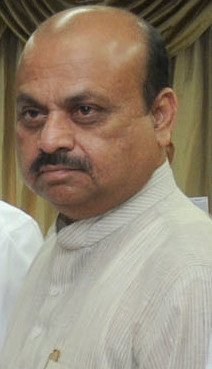
- Incumbent Basavaraj Bommai
- Party: Bharatiya Janata Party
- Elected year: 2024

Haveri Lok Sabha constituency is one of the 28 Lok Sabha (lower house of the Indian parliament) constituencies in Karnataka, a state in southern India. This constituency was created as part of the delimitation of the parliamentary constituencies in 2008. It first held elections in 2009 and its first member of parliament (MP) was Shivkumar Chanabasappa Udasi of the Bharatiya Janata Party. As of the latest elections in 2024, Basavaraj Bommai of the same party represents this constituency.

== Assembly segments ==
As of 2008, Haveri Lok Sabha constituency comprises the following eight Vidhan Sabha (legislative assembly) segments:

No	Name	District	Member	Party	Party Leading (in 2024)
65	Shirahatti (SC)	Gadag	Chandru Lamani	BJP	INC
66	Gadag	Gadag	H. K. Patil	INC	BJP
67	Ron	Gadag	Gurupadagouda Patil	INC	INC
82	Hangal	Haveri	Srinivas Mane	INC	BJP
84	Haveri (SC)	Haveri	Rudrappa Lamani	INC	BJP
85	Byadgi	Haveri	Basavaraj Shivannanavar	INC	BJP
86	Hirekerur	Haveri	U. B. Banakar	INC	BJP
87	Ranibennur	Haveri	Prakash Koliwad	INC	BJP

Haveri, Shirahatti, Hangal, Hirekerur, Byadgi, and Ranibennur Legislative Assembly segments were earlier in the former Dharwad South constituency. Gadag and Ron Legislative Assembly segments were in the former Dharwad North and Bagalkot constituencies respectively.

== Members of Parliament ==
Year	Member	Party
1952-2008 : See Dharwad South
2009	Shivkumar Udasi	Bharatiya Janata Party
2014	Shivkumar Udasi	Bharatiya Janata Party
2019	Shivkumar Udasi	Bharatiya Janata Party
2024	Basavaraj Bommai	Bharatiya Janata Party

== Election results ==
=== 2024 ===
2024 Indian general election: Haveri
Party	Candidate	Votes	%	±%
BJP	Basavaraj Bommai	705,538	50.55	−3.42
INC	Anandswamy Gaddadevarmath	6,62,025	47.43	+4.58
NOTA	None of the above	10,865	0.78	+0.19
Majority		43,513	3.12	−7.99
Turnout		13,97,131	77.86	+3.65
BJP hold		Swing		

=== 2019 ===
2019 Indian general election: Haveri
Party	Candidate	Votes	%	±%
BJP	Shivkumar Chanabasappa Udasi	683,660	53.97	+3.18
INC	D. R. Patil	5,42,778	42.85	−0.09
BSP	Ayubkhan A Pathan	7,479	0.59	+0.03
NOTA	None of the above	7,412	0.59	0.25
Margin of victory		1,40,882	11.11	
Turnout		12,67,888	74.21	+2.60
BJP hold		Swing		

=== 2014 ===
2014 Indian general election: Haveri
Party	Candidate	Votes	%	±%
BJP	Shivkumar Chanabasappa Udasi	566,790	50.79	+1.46
INC	Saleem Ahmed	4,79,219	42.94	+3.65
IND	Shiddappa Kallappa Poojar	15,656	1.40	N/A
JD(S)	Ravi Menasinakai	9,814	0.88	−4.35
IND.	Rudresh Ramanna Hadagali	7,320	0.66	N/A
BSP	Halappa Timmenahalli	6,229	0.56	−0.28
Margin of victory		87,571	7.85	−2.23
Turnout		11,16,368	71.62	+8.03
BJP hold		Swing		

=== 2009 ===
2009 Indian general election: Haveri
Party	Candidate	Votes	%	±%
BJP	Shivkumar Chanabasappa Udasi	430,293	49.33	N/A
INC	Saleem Ahmed	3,42,373	39.25	N/A
JD(S)	Shivkumargoud Shidlingangouda Patil	45,659	5.23	N/A
IND.	Basavaraj Shankrappa Desai	11,372	1.30	N/A
NCP	Ashok Mallappa Javali	8,334	0.96	N/A
ABHM	Krishnaji Raghavendrarao Onkar	7,376	0.85	N/A
BSP	Igala Dilleppa Kariyappa	7,341	0.84	N/A
Margin of victory		87,920	10.08	N/A
Turnout		8,72,241	63.59	N/A
BJP win (new seat)				

== See also ==
- Dharwad North Lok Sabha constituency
- Dharwad South Lok Sabha constituency
- Haveri district
- List of constituencies of the Lok Sabha
