= Shivkumar Chanabasappa Udasi =

Indian politician

Member of Parliament, Lok Sabha
- In office 16 May 2009 – 4 June 2024
- Constituency: Haveri

Personal details
- Born: 20 May 1967 (age 58) Haveri, Karnataka, India
- Party: Bharatiya Janata Party
- Spouse: Revathi (m. 2003)
- Children: 2
- Parents: Neelambika C. Udasi (mother); C. M. Udasi (father)
- Education: B.E.
- Alma mater: Sainik school Bijapur Vijayapura, Bangalore Institute of Technology, Bangalore, Karnataka.
- Occupation: Builder and politician

Shivkumar Chanabasappa Udasi is a member of the 17th Lok Sabha of India. He represents the Haveri-Gadag constituency of Karnataka and is a member of the Bharatiya Janata Party (BJP) political party. He is a member of Standing Committee on Energy and Consultative Committee, Ministry of Jal Shakti.

== Education and background ==
Shivkumar Chanabasappa Udasi studied from the Sainik school, Bijapur and holds a B.E. degree from Bangalore Institute of Technology, Bangalore, Karnataka. He was a builder by profession before joining politics.

== Posts held ==
No.	From	To	Position
01	2009	Date	Elected to 15th Lok Sabha
02	2009	Date	Member, Committee on Urban Development
03	2009	Date	Member, Committee on External Affairs
04	2014	Date	Elected to 16th Lok Sabha
05	2019	Date	Elected to 17th Lok Sabha

== See also ==
- List of members of the 15th Lok Sabha of India
- List of members of the 16th Lok Sabha of India
- List of members of the 17th Lok Sabha of India
