= Chincholi Assembly constituency =

Constituency of the Karnataka Legislative Assembly

Coordinates: 17.46°N 77.42°E

Chincholi
- Constituency No. 42 for the Karnataka Legislative Assembly

Constituency details
- Country: India
- Region: South India
- State: Karnataka
- District: Kalaburagi
- Lok Sabha constituency: Bidar
- Established: 1951
- Total electors: 203,600
- Reservation: SC

Member of Legislative Assembly
- 16th Karnataka Legislative Assembly
- Incumbent Avinash Umesh Jadhav
- Party: Bharatiya Janata Party
- Elected year: 2019
- Preceded by: Umesh. G. Jadhav

Chincholi Assembly constituency is one of the 224 assembly constituencies of Karnataka, a southern state of India. This constituency falls under Bidar Lok Sabha constituency.

== Members of the Legislative Assembly ==
Election	Member	Party
1952	Ramchari. G	Indian National Congress
1952 By-election	Shankerappa	Indian National Congress
1957	Veerendra Patil	Indian National Congress
1962	Veerendra Patil	Indian National Congress
1967	V. P. Basappa	Indian National Congress
1972	Devendrappa Ghalappa Jamadar	Indian National Congress
1978	Devendrappa Ghalappa Jamadar	Indian National Congress
1983	Devendrappa Ghalappa Jamadar	Indian National Congress
1985	Veerayya Swami Mahalingayya	Indian National Congress
1989	Veerendra Patil	Indian National Congress
1994	Vaijnath Patil	Janata Dal
1999	Kailashnath Patil	Indian National Congress
2004	Vaijnath Patil	Janata Dal
2008	Sunil Vallyapure	Bharatiya Janata Party
2013	Dr. Umesh. G. Jadhav	Indian National Congress
2018	Dr. Umesh. G. Jadhav	Indian National Congress
2019 By-election (Note: Resigned on 01/04/2019)	Dr. Avinash Umesh Jadhav	Bharatiya Janata Party
2023	Dr. Avinash Umesh Jadhav	Bharatiya Janata Party

== Election results ==
=== Assembly Election 2023 ===
2023 Karnataka Legislative Assembly election : Chincholi
Party	Candidate	Votes	%	±%
BJP	Dr. Avinash Umesh Jadhav	69,963	46.66	▼3.79
INC	Subhash V. Rathod	69,105	46.09	▲1.51
JD(S)	Sanjeevan Yakapur	6,555	4.37	New
BSP	Goutam	1,078	0.72	▼0.65
NOTA	None of the above	1,003	0.67	▲0.37
Margin of victory		858	0.57	▼5.29
Turnout		150,090	73.72	▲2.89
Total valid votes		149,940		
Registered electors		203,600		▲4.97
BJP hold		Swing	▼3.79	

=== Assembly By-election 2019 ===
2019 Karnataka Legislative Assembly by-election : Chincholi
Party	Candidate	Votes	%	±%
BJP	Avinash Umesh Jadhav	69,109	50.45	▲9.33
INC	Subhash V. Rathod	61,079	44.58	▼10.99
BSP	Goutam Bomnalli	1,873	1.37	New
Independent	Hanumantha Rama Naik. M. B	1,268	0.93	New
NOTA	None of the above	416	0.30	▼0.51
Margin of victory		8,030	5.86	▼8.59
Turnout		137,386	70.83	▲2.05
Total valid votes		136,995		
Registered electors		193,956		▲0.16
BJP gain from INC		Swing	▼5.12	

=== Assembly Election 2018 ===
2018 Karnataka Legislative Assembly election : Chincholi
Party	Candidate	Votes	%	±%
INC	Dr. Umesh. G. Jadhav	73,905	55.57	▲8.09
BJP	Sunil Vallyapure	54,693	41.12	▲31.13
JD(S)	Sushilabai B. Korvi	1,621	1.22	▲0.23
NOTA	None of the above	1,082	0.81	New
Margin of victory		19,212	14.45	▼6.67
Turnout		133,188	68.78	▲1.85
Total valid votes		132,998		
Registered electors		193,648		▲14.36
INC hold		Swing	▲8.09	

=== Assembly Election 2013 ===
2013 Karnataka Legislative Assembly election : Chincholi
Party	Candidate	Votes	%	±%
INC	Dr. Umesh. G. Jadhav	58,599	47.48	▲13.58
KJP	Sunil Vallyapure	32,539	26.36	New
BJP	Ramesh Yakapur	12,333	9.99	▼32.11
Independent	Sunil Mothilal	3,081	2.50	New
BSP	Goutam Bomnalli	1,374	1.11	▼2.92
Independent	Sandeep Chawan	1,288	1.04	New
JD(S)	Mallikarjun Gajre	1,218	0.99	▼8.39
Margin of victory		26,060	21.12	▲12.92
Turnout		113,341	66.93	▲12.89
Total valid votes		123,418		
Registered electors		169,337		▲8.51
INC gain from BJP		Swing	▲5.38	

=== Assembly Election 2008 ===
2008 Karnataka Legislative Assembly election : Chincholi
Party	Candidate	Votes	%	±%
BJP	Sunil Vallyapure	35,491	42.10	▲22.89
INC	Baburao Chauhan	28,580	33.90	▲0.36
JD(S)	Gopalrao Kattimani	7,909	9.38	▼29.69
BSP	Shankar Bayya	3,395	4.03	▲2.41
Independent	Mallikarjun Gajre	2,834	3.36	New
Independent	Shivukumar Kollur	1,981	2.35	New
SP	S. H. Hosamani	1,184	1.40	▲0.52
Independent	Manik	871	1.03	New
Independent	Basvaraj Anwarkar	608	0.72	New
Margin of victory		6,911	8.20	▲2.68
Turnout		84,335	54.04	▼5.28
Total valid votes		84,295		
Registered electors		156,050		▼0.16
BJP gain from JD(S)		Swing	▲3.03	

=== Assembly Election 2004 ===
2004 Karnataka Legislative Assembly election : Chincholi
Party	Candidate	Votes	%	±%
JD(S)	Vaijnath Patil	36,184	39.07	▲18.82
INC	Kailashnath Patil	31,067	33.54	▼18.84
BJP	Veerayya Swami. M	17,794	19.21	▼0.03
JP	Dr. Omnath Rathod	1,972	2.13	New
Independent	Basvaraj Anwarkar	1,672	1.81	New
BSP	Dr. Shivakumar Swamy	1,497	1.62	▲0.73
Kannada Nadu Party	Jagnnath Reddy Mali Patil	834	0.90	New
SP	R. R. Patil	818	0.88	▼1.62
Independent	Amjad Ali S/o Ahmed Patil	782	0.84	New
Margin of victory		5,117	5.52	▼26.61
Turnout		92,717	59.32	▼3.60
Total valid votes		92,620		
Registered electors		156,293		▲13.51
JD(S) gain from INC		Swing	▼13.31	

=== Assembly Election 1999 ===
1999 Karnataka Legislative Assembly election : Chincholi
Party	Candidate	Votes	%	±%
INC	Kailashnath Patil	42,814	52.38	▲31.14
JD(S)	Vaijnath Patil	16,551	20.25	New
BJP	Shivasharnappa Japatti	15,724	19.24	▲17.17
Independent	Syed Mastan Ali	3,462	4.24	New
SP	R. R. Patil	2,047	2.50	New
BSP	Dr. H. S. Shivpur	731	0.89	New
Margin of victory		26,263	32.13	▼15.76
Turnout		86,635	62.92	▼3.51
Total valid votes		81,739		
Rejected ballots		4,896	5.65	▲3.20
Registered electors		137,689		▲9.41
INC gain from JD		Swing	▼16.75	

=== Assembly Election 1994 ===
1994 Karnataka Legislative Assembly election : Chincholi
Party	Candidate	Votes	%	±%
JD	Vaijnath Patil	56,373	69.13	▲60.77
INC	Kailashnath Patil	17,320	21.24	▼19.74
INC	Jarnappa Chincholi	4,549	5.58	New
BJP	Subhas	1,688	2.07	New
RPI	Jagadev. S. Anawarker	578	0.71	New
Margin of victory		39,053	47.89	▲45.07
Turnout		83,597	66.43	▼0.63
Total valid votes		81,552		
Rejected ballots		2,045	2.45	▼4.34
Registered electors		125,842		▲8.29
JD gain from INC		Swing	▲28.15	

=== Assembly Election 1989 ===
1989 Karnataka Legislative Assembly election : Chincholi
Party	Candidate	Votes	%	±%
INC	Veerendra Patil	29,762	40.98	▼5.34
JP	Vaijnath Patil	27,717	38.16	New
Independent	Kishan	7,303	10.06	New
JD	Bassayya	6,072	8.36	New
Independent	Bhimanna	1,286	1.77	New
Margin of victory		2,045	2.82	▼0.68
Turnout		77,923	67.06	▲18.79
Total valid votes		72,629		
Rejected ballots		5,294	6.79	▲4.75
Registered electors		116,207		▲24.86
INC hold		Swing	▼5.34	

=== Assembly Election 1985 ===
1985 Karnataka Legislative Assembly election : Chincholi
Party	Candidate	Votes	%	±%
INC	Veerayya Swami Mahalingayya	20,387	46.32	▲7.67
JP	Chander Rao Patil	18,847	42.82	▲4.35
BJP	B. N. Patil	1,482	3.37	▼0.81
Independent	Shamrao Ramteerth	1,090	2.48	New
Independent	Shantappa Narasappa	607	1.38	New
Independent	K. Basireddy Tippareddy Patil	583	1.32	New
Independent	Kailas Nagappa	314	0.71	New
Margin of victory		1,540	3.50	▲3.33
Turnout		44,925	48.27	▼12.80
Total valid votes		44,010		
Rejected ballots		915	2.04	▼1.25
Registered electors		93,067		▲8.86
INC hold		Swing	▲7.67	

=== Assembly Election 1983 ===
1983 Karnataka Legislative Assembly election : Chincholi
Party	Candidate	Votes	%	±%
INC	Devendrappa Ghalappa Jamadar	19,513	38.65	▲30.46
JP	Vaijnath Sangappa Patil	19,425	38.47	▼0.30
Independent	Abdul Rasid. M. Abdul Karimsab	5,937	11.76	New
BJP	Shivaram Naik Govind Naik	2,109	4.18	New
Independent	Baswaraj Sangappa Kanakeri	1,131	2.24	New
Independent	Baswaraj Revansiddappa	942	1.87	New
Independent	Kalyanappa Gundappa Patil	862	1.71	New
Independent	Sham Sunder Mooli	573	1.13	New
Margin of victory		88	0.17	▼12.66
Turnout		52,211	61.07	▼6.48
Total valid votes		50,492		
Rejected ballots		1,719	3.29	▼0.29
Registered electors		85,493		▲10.65
INC gain from INC(I)		Swing	▼12.94	

=== Assembly Election 1978 ===
1978 Karnataka Legislative Assembly election : Chincholi
Party	Candidate	Votes	%	±%
INC(I)	Devendrappa Ghalappa Jamadar	25,963	51.59	New
JP	Vaijnath Patil Sangappa Patil	19,508	38.77	New
INC	Veerareddy Seri	4,123	8.19	▼51.33
Independent	Shankarappa Shivpure	727	1.44	New
Margin of victory		6,455	12.83	▼9.26
Turnout		52,192	67.55	▲11.75
Total valid votes		50,321		
Rejected ballots		1,871	3.58	▲3.58
Registered electors		77,266		▲2.23
INC(I) gain from INC		Swing	▼7.93	

=== Assembly Election 1972 ===
1972 Mysore State Legislative Assembly election : Chincholi
Party	Candidate	Votes	%	±%
INC	Devendrappa Ghalappa Jamadar	24,364	59.52	▼28.46
INC(O)	C. P. Baswantrao Patil	15,322	37.43	New
Independent	V. Bassappa Imdapur	1,247	3.05	New
Margin of victory		9,042	22.09	▼55.64
Turnout		42,177	55.80	▼3.83
Total valid votes		40,933		
Registered electors		75,584		▲21.52
INC hold		Swing	▼28.46	

=== Assembly Election 1967 ===
1967 Mysore State Legislative Assembly election : Chincholi
Party	Candidate	Votes	%	±%
INC	V. P. Basappa	31,030	87.98	▲31.58
SWA	R. R. J. Rao	3,617	10.26	▼33.34
Independent	S. Sharnappa	621	1.76	New
Margin of victory		27,413	77.73	▲64.94
Turnout		37,091	59.63	▲13.21
Total valid votes		35,268		
Registered electors		62,199		▲17.40
INC hold		Swing	▲31.58	

=== Assembly Election 1962 ===
1962 Mysore State Legislative Assembly election : Chincholi
Party	Candidate	Votes	%	±%
INC	Veerendra Patil	13,391	56.40	▼3.86
SWA	Sharangowda Sidramayya	10,353	43.60	New
Margin of victory		3,038	12.79	▼7.73
Turnout		24,591	46.42	▲14.42
Total valid votes		23,744		
Registered electors		52,980		▲7.09
INC hold		Swing	▼3.86	

=== Assembly Election 1957 ===
1957 Mysore State Legislative Assembly election : Chincholi
Party	Candidate	Votes	%	±%
INC	Veerendra Patil	9,539	60.26	▼12.70
Independent	Saibanna Narsappa	6,291	39.74	New
Margin of victory		3,248	20.52	▼33.70
Turnout		15,830	32.00	
Total valid votes		15,830		
Registered electors		49,473		
INC hold		Swing	▼12.70	

=== Assembly By-election 1952 ===
1952 Hyderabad State Legislative Assembly by-election : Chincholi
Party	Candidate	Votes	%	±%
INC	Shankerappa	11,871	72.96	▲13.90
PDF	V. Rao	3,050	18.75	New
PSP	G. Shankar	1,349	8.29	New
Margin of victory		8,821	54.22	▲33.26
Total valid votes		16,270		
INC hold		Swing	▲13.90	

=== Assembly Election 1952 ===
1952 Hyderabad State Legislative Assembly election : Chincholi
Party	Candidate	Votes	%	±%
INC	Ramchari. G	7,603	59.06	New
RPI	Hari Kishan	4,905	38.10	New
Independent	Shankrappa	365	2.84	New
Margin of victory		2,698	20.96	
Turnout		12,873	26.61	
Total valid votes		12,873		
Registered electors		48,380		
INC win (new seat)				

== See also ==
- Bidar (Lok Sabha constituency)
- Kalaburagi district
