= Shahabad, Karnataka Assembly constituency =

Former Assembly constituency in Karnataka, India

Coordinates: 17.33°N 76.83°E

Shahabad
- Former constituency for the Karnataka Legislative Assembly

Constituency details
- Country: India
- Region: South India
- State: Karnataka
- Division: Gulbarga
- District: Gulbarga
- Lok Sabha constituency: Gulbarga
- Established: 1978
- Abolished: 2008
- Reservation: SC

Shahabad Assembly constituency was one of the constituencies in Karnataka state assembly in India until 2008 when it was made defunct. It was part of Gulbarga Lok Sabha constituency.

== Members of the Legislative Assembly ==
Year	Member	Party
1978	Sharnappa Fakeerappa Bhairy	Communist Party of India
1983	K. B. Shanappa	Communist Party of India
1985	K. B. Shanappa	Communist Party of India
1989	Baburao Chavan	Indian National Congress
1994	Gurunath Chandram	Janata Dal
1999	Baburao Chavan	Indian National Congress
2004	Sunil Vallyapure	Bharatiya Janata Party
2008 onwards: Seat does not exist

== Election results ==
=== Assembly Election 2004 ===
2004 Karnataka Legislative Assembly election : Shahabad
Party	Candidate	Votes	%	±%
BJP	Sunil Vallyapure	32,625	30.41%	▼2.46
INC	Chavan R B	31,607	29.46%	▼11.97
JD(S)	Gurunath Chandram	31,365	29.23%	▲25.49
JP	Subhash S Pawar	3,704	3.45%	New
BSP	Chandrashekhar Naik Siddu Naik	2,976	2.77%	▼3.50
Independent	Mohan Huli	2,229	2.08%	New
Independent	Diwakar H V	1,123	1.05%	New
Kannada Nadu Party	Suresh Basanna Goure	908	0.85%	New
Independent	Timmayya B Aramani	750	0.70%	New
Margin of victory		1,018	0.95%	▼7.61
Turnout		1,07,287	50.52%	▼0.86
Registered electors		2,12,365		▲18.72
BJP gain from INC		Swing	▼11.02	

=== Assembly Election 1999 ===
1999 Karnataka Legislative Assembly election : Shahabad
Party	Candidate	Votes	%	±%
INC	Baburao Chavhan	38,072	41.43%	▲21.73
BJP	Valmik Kamalu Naik	30,206	32.87%	▲14.73
JD(U)	C. Gurunath	12,777	13.90%	New
BSP	Dr. S.H. Katti	5,769	6.28%	▲2.06
JD(S)	Ashok Lakhe	3,441	3.74%	New
Independent	Mapanna Hadanur	1,636	1.78%	New
Margin of victory		7,866	8.56%	▼12.08
Turnout		91,901	54.41%	▲1.55
Registered electors		1,78,880		▲9.13
INC gain from JD		Swing	▲1.10	

=== Assembly Election 1994 ===
1994 Karnataka Legislative Assembly election : Shahabad
Party	Candidate	Votes	%	±%
JD	C. Gurunath	32,937	40.33%	New
INC	Baburao Chavhan	16,086	19.70%	▼18.98
BJP	Arvind Guruji	14,811	18.14%	▲14.29
INC	Jemsing Chavan	8,074	9.89%	New
BSP	D.G. Sagar	3,447	4.22%	New
CPI	Sharanappa Bhairi	3,117	3.82%	▼22.05
Independent	Vadde Nagappa	2,010	2.46%	New
Independent	Chandrakant Harsur	514	0.63%	New
Independent	Dr. Aruna Sanjeevkumar	421	0.52%	New
Margin of victory		16,851	20.63%	▲10.17
Turnout		81,665	51.62%	▲1.70
Registered electors		1,63,910		
JD gain from INC		Swing	▲1.66	

=== Assembly Election 1989 ===
1989 Karnataka Legislative Assembly election : Shahabad
Party	Candidate	Votes	%	±%
INC	Baburao Chavhan	26,189	38.67%	▲12.36
JP	Gurunath Chandram	19,104	28.21%	New
CPI	Bhajentri Saibanna	17,518	25.87%	▼1.54
BJP	Shanker Desai	2,602	3.84%	▲0.16
Kranti Sabha	Devala	1,501	2.22%	New
Independent	Annappa	435	0.64%	New
Independent	Hanamanth Bhavimani Hagarga	367	0.54%	New
Margin of victory		7,085	10.46%	▲10.34
Turnout		67,716	52.91%	▼4.58
Registered electors		1,40,721		
INC gain from CPI		Swing	▲11.27	

=== Assembly Election 1985 ===
1985 Karnataka Legislative Assembly election : Shahabad
Party	Candidate	Votes	%	±%
CPI	K. B. Shanappa	16,263	27.41%	▼17.24
Independent	Gurunath Chandram	16,188	27.28%	New
INC	Govind P. Vedyaraj	15,612	26.31%	▼17.55
Independent	Ramu Bhimla Chavan	7,495	12.63%	New
BJP	Shanker Iranna Desai	2,183	3.68%	▼1.74
Independent	Devasunder Martur	905	1.53%	New
LKD	Sangolgi Prabhu R.	691	1.16%	New
Margin of victory		75	0.13%	▼0.66
Turnout		59,337	54.65%	▲14.45
Registered electors		1,12,603		▲13.86
CPI hold		Swing	▼17.24	

=== Assembly Election 1983 ===
1983 Karnataka Legislative Assembly election : Shahabad
Party	Candidate	Votes	%	±%
CPI	K. B. Shanappa	16,888	44.65%	▼6.86
INC	Narsing Rao Jadhav	16,590	43.86%	▲36.60
BJP	Arjun Ramanna	2,048	5.41%	New
Independent	Prabhu	854	2.26%	New
Independent	Shivaram Moga Sambaji	734	1.94%	New
Independent	Saibanna Sharanappa	711	1.88%	New
Margin of victory		298	0.79%	▼18.82
Turnout		37,825	39.79%	▼9.27
Registered electors		98,894		▲6.70
CPI hold		Swing	▼6.86	

=== Assembly Election 1978 ===
1978 Karnataka Legislative Assembly election : Shahabad
Party	Candidate	Votes	%	±%
CPI	Sharnappa Fakeerappa Bhairy	22,685	51.50%	New
JP	S.M.Hagaragi	14,047	31.89%	New
RPI(K)	Shivaram Mogha	4,114	9.34%	New
INC	Hirasingh Rathod	3,199	7.26%	New
Margin of victory		8,638	19.61%	
Turnout		44,045	49.84%	
Registered electors		92,687		
CPI win (new seat)				

== See also ==
- List of constituencies of the Karnataka Legislative Assembly
