= Umesh. G. Jadhav =

Indian politician (born 1959)

Dr. Umesh Jadhav
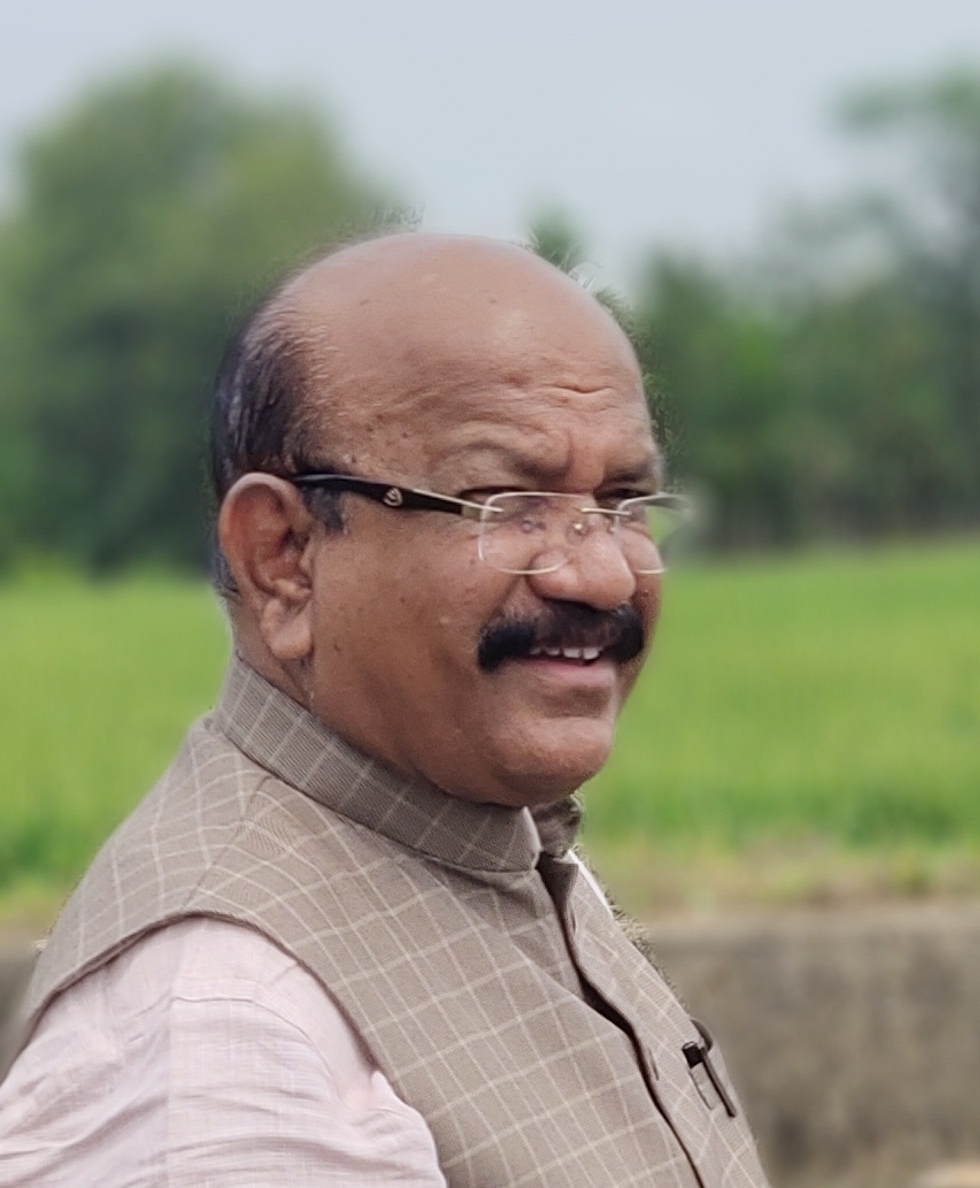
- Umesh Jadhav in 2021

Member of Parliament, Lok Sabha
- In office 23 May 2019 – 04 June 2024
- Preceded by: Mallikarjun Kharge
- Succeeded by: Radhakrishna Doddamani
- Constituency: Gulbarga

Member of Karnataka Legislative Assembly
- In office 2013–2019
- Preceded by: Sunil Vallyapure
- Succeeded by: Avinash Umesh Jadhav
- Constituency: Chincholi

Personal details
- Born: 24 March 1959 (age 67) Bhedsur
- Party: Bharatiya Janata Party (2019-Present)
- Other political affiliations: Indian National Congress (2013-6 March 2019)
- Children: Avinash Umesh Jadhav
- Education: Master of Surgery in General Surgery (1991)
- Alma mater: Bangalore Medical College
- Profession: Doctor

Umesh Gopaldev Jadhav is an Indian politician served as Member of Parliament in the 17th Lok Sabha from Kalaburagi Lok Sabha constituency from 23 May 2019 to 4 June 2024. He was an Indian National Congress party's MLA from Chincholi Assembly Constituency. Later, he resigned from the Congress party in March 2019 and then he joined (BJP) Bharatiya Janata Party and contested Lok Sabha elections from Gulbarga and was elected as a Member of Parliament (Lok Sabha).

== Life and education ==
Jadhav was born to Gopaldev and hails from Gulbarga. He completed his Master of Surgery in General Surgery in 1991 from Bangalore Medical College. He is a Surgeon by profession.

== Positions held ==
- Member of the Legislative Assembly from Chincholi : 2013 to 2018
- Parliamentary Secretary Health and Family welfare department.
- Member of the Legislative Assembly from Chincholi 2018– 2 April 2019
- Member Of Parliament 17th Loksabha from Gulbarga Lok Sabha constituency.
