= Avinash Umesh Jadhav =

Indian politician

Member of the Karnataka Legislative Assembly
- Incumbent
- Assumed office 2019
- Preceded by: Umesh Jadhav
- Constituency: Chincholi

Personal details
- Parent: Umesh Jadhav (father)

Dr. Avinash Umesh Jadhav is an Indian politician serving as a member of the Karnataka Legislative Assembly, representing Chincholi assembly constituency since from 2019. He contested and won the 2023 Karnataka elections gaining 69963 votes. He first won the constituency in 2019 Karnataka bypolls by a margin of 8,030 votes, defeating Congress candidate Subash Rathod.

== Political career ==
Avinash Umesh Jadhav began his political career with the BJP, winning the Chincholi seat in the 2019 Karnataka Legislative Assembly byelection. He successfully retained the seat in 2023 as a Bharatiya Janata Party candidate. Avinash Umesh Jadhav's development agenda.

=== Constituency work ===
During his tenure (2019–present), Avinash Umesh Jadhav has focused on:

- Water infrastructure: Initiated pipeline projects and new borewells in drought-affected villages
- Rural connectivity: Upgraded 35 km of roads connecting agricultural lands to markets (Karnataka Assembly Records, 2022)
- Education support: Distributed scholarships to 1,200 SC/ST students (Vijaya Karnataka, 15 June 2023)
- Healthcare access: Established 3 new primary health centers in remote areas (Prajavani, 8 March 2024)
