= Sunitha Veerappa Gowda =

Indian politician

Sunitha Veerappa Gowda is an Indian politician from Karnataka. She is a former Member of the Legislative Assembly from Bannur Assembly constituency in Mysore district representing the Bharatiya Janata Party.

Sunitha is from Somanathapura, Mysore.

Sunitha became an MLA for the first time winning the 2004 Karnataka Legislative Assembly election from Bannur Assembly constituency representing the Bharatiya Janata Party. She polled 33,522 votes and defeated her nearest rival, Chikkamada Nayaka of the Indian National Congress, by a margin of 5,663 votes. She later shifted to the Janata Dal (S) in January 2023 joined the Indian National Congress Party.

In February 2011, she was elected as the president of the Mysuru Zilla Parishad for the second time following an alliance between JD (S) and BJP.
