= Bannur Assembly constituency =

Former constituency in Karnataka State, India

Coordinates: 12.33°N 76.86°E

Bannur
- Former constituency for the Karnataka Legislative Assembly

Constituency details
- Country: India
- Region: South India
- State: Karnataka
- District: Mysore
- Lok Sabha constituency: Chamarajanagar
- Established: 1972
- Abolished: 2008
- Reservation: None

Bannur Assembly constituency was one of the 224 Assembly constituencies in Karnataka Legislative Assembly. It used to come under Mysore district and was abolished after the 2008 delimitation exercise with most of its area being merged into T. Narasipur Assembly constituency.

== Members of the Legislative Assembly ==
Election	Member	Party
1962	S. Siddiah	Praja Socialist Party
1967	T. P. Boraiah	Independent politician
1972	K. Made Gowda	Indian National Congress
1978	K. Made Gowda	Indian National Congress
1983	T. P. Boraiah	Independent politician
1985	K. J. Ramaswamy	Janata Party
1989	K. M. Chikkamadanaik	Indian National Congress
1994	S. Krishnappa	Janata Dal
1999	K. M. Chikkamadanaik	Indian National Congress
2004	Sunitha Veerappa Gowda	Bharatiya Janata Party

== Election results ==
=== Assembly Election 2004 ===
2004 Karnataka Legislative Assembly election : Bannur
Party	Candidate	Votes	%	±%
BJP	Sunitha Veerappa Gowda	33,522	34.00%	▲22.17
INC	Chikkamada Nayaka	27,859	28.26%	▼20.72
JD(S)	Nagaraju. M	27,647	28.04%	▲7.61
BSP	Krishna. S	5,944	6.03%	New
Urs Samyuktha Paksha	Raju. D	1,883	1.91%	New
Kannada Nadu Party	Kemparaj Talakad. G	1,736	1.76%	New
Margin of victory		5,663	5.74%	▼22.82
Turnout		98,591	70.19%	▼5.79
Total valid votes		98,591		
Registered electors		140,468		▲8.33
BJP gain from INC		Swing	▼14.98	

=== Assembly Election 1999 ===
1999 Karnataka Legislative Assembly election : Bannur
Party	Candidate	Votes	%	±%
INC	K. M. Chikkamadanaik	45,706	48.98%	▲13.13
JD(S)	S. Krishnappa	19,060	20.43%	New
JD(U)	K. Made Gowda	12,993	13.92%	New
BJP	R. Shankaregowda	11,035	11.83%	▲9.11
BRP	H. P. Udayakumar	2,134	2.29%	New
Independent	S. Govindaraju	2,029	2.17%	New
Margin of victory		26,646	28.56%	▲15.43
Turnout		98,515	75.98%	▼2.61
Total valid votes		93,313		
Rejected ballots		5,166	5.24%	▲3.66
Registered electors		129,661		▲4.51
INC gain from JD		Swing	▲0.01	

=== Assembly Election 1994 ===
1994 Karnataka Legislative Assembly election : Bannur
Party	Candidate	Votes	%	±%
JD	S. Krishnappa	46,992	48.97%	▲32.82
INC	K. M. Chikkamadanaik	34,398	35.85%	▼5.65
KRRS	A. S. Kempegowda	5,487	5.72%	New
BJP	K. P. Mahadevaswamy	2,611	2.72%	New
Independent	S. Sundar	2,065	2.15%	New
INC	R. Shankaregowda	1,858	1.94%	New
Independent	K. Kempegowda	789	0.82%	New
Independent	V. S. Ganesh	724	0.75%	New
Margin of victory		12,594	13.13%	▼5.15
Turnout		97,496	78.59%	▲0.21
Total valid votes		95,951		
Rejected ballots		1,545	1.58%	▼4.00
Registered electors		124,064		▲11.40
JD gain from INC		Swing	▲7.47	

=== Assembly Election 1989 ===
1989 Karnataka Legislative Assembly election : Bannur
Party	Candidate	Votes	%	±%
INC	K. M. Chikkamadanaik	34,204	41.50%	▲1.49
JP	S. Krishnappa	19,137	23.22%	New
JD	K. P. Mahadevaswamy	13,308	16.15%	New
Independent	T. P. Boraiah	10,784	13.09%	New
Independent	B. H. Channakeshavamurthy	2,322	2.82%	New
Independent	Puttamadegowda	667	0.81%	New
Independent	C. Nanjundaiah	529	0.64%	New
Margin of victory		15,067	18.28%	▲7.55
Turnout		87,288	78.38%	▼0.31
Total valid votes		82,413		
Rejected ballots		4,875	5.58%	▲3.82
Registered electors		111,371		▲22.53
INC gain from JP		Swing	▼9.25	

=== Assembly Election 1985 ===
1985 Karnataka Legislative Assembly election : Bannur
Party	Candidate	Votes	%	±%
JP	K. J. Ramaswamy	35,656	50.75%	▲41.84
INC	K. M. Chikkamadanaik	28,114	40.01%	▲1.21
LKD	R. Lakshmanaswamy	2,380	3.39%	New
Independent	N. Rachaiah	2,276	3.24%	New
Independent	B. K. Siddaraju	499	0.71%	New
Independent	Venkatachalaiah	455	0.65%	New
Margin of victory		7,542	10.73%	▲1.36
Turnout		71,522	78.69%	▲0.16
Total valid votes		70,265		
Rejected ballots		1,257	1.76%	▼0.59
Registered electors		90,891		▲8.35
JP gain from Independent		Swing	▲2.59	

=== Assembly Election 1983 ===
1983 Karnataka Legislative Assembly election : Bannur
Party	Candidate	Votes	%	±%
Independent	T. P. Boraiah	30,982	48.16%	New
INC	K. Made Gowda	24,957	38.80%	▲33.67
JP	Sosale Javaraiah	5,731	8.91%	▼26.72
INC(J)	Mahadevaswamy. S	1,605	2.49%	New
Independent	Ahmed Sheref. S. M	589	0.92%	New
Independent	Nanjuundaswamy	465	0.72%	New
Margin of victory		6,025	9.37%	▲2.80
Turnout		65,875	78.53%	▼4.79
Total valid votes		64,329		
Rejected ballots		1,546	2.35%	▼0.23
Registered electors		83,885		▲8.75
Independent gain from INC(I)		Swing	▲5.96	

=== Assembly Election 1978 ===
1978 Karnataka Legislative Assembly election : Bannur
Party	Candidate	Votes	%	±%
INC(I)	K. Made Gowda	26,422	42.20%	New
JP	K. J. Ramaswamy	22,307	35.63%	New
Independent	K. M. Chikkamadanaik	9,982	15.94%	New
INC	S. Siddiah	3,211	5.13%	▼41.79
Independent	Shivaswamy. M. S	688	1.10%	New
Margin of victory		4,115	6.57%	▲4.16
Turnout		64,270	83.32%	▲14.50
Total valid votes		62,610		
Rejected ballots		1,660	2.58%	▲2.58
Registered electors		77,135		▲16.16
INC(I) gain from INC(O)		Swing	▼7.13	

=== Assembly Election 1972 ===
1972 Mysore State Legislative Assembly election : Bannur
Party	Candidate	Votes	%	±%
INC(O)	K. Made Gowda	21,880	49.33%	New
INC	T. P. Boraiah	20,809	46.92%	▲16.32
Independent	M. Kempaiah	1,663	3.75%	New
Margin of victory		1,071	2.41%	▼8.88
Turnout		45,697	68.82%	▼6.55
Total valid votes		44,352		
Registered electors		66,404		▲20.57
INC(O) gain from Independent		Swing	▲7.44	

=== Assembly Election 1967 ===
1967 Mysore State Legislative Assembly election : Bannur
Party	Candidate	Votes	%	±%
Independent	T. P. Boraiah	16,360	41.89%	New
INC	S. Siddiah	11,950	30.60%	▼18.33
SWA	K. M. C. Naika	8,573	21.95%	New
Independent	Ramalingiah	2,168	5.55%	New
Margin of victory		4,410	11.29%	▲9.15
Turnout		41,509	75.37%	▲17.53
Total valid votes		39,051		
Registered electors		55,076		▲9.21
Independent gain from PSP		Swing	▼9.18	

=== Assembly Election 1962 ===
1962 Mysore State Legislative Assembly election : Bannur
Party	Candidate	Votes	%	±%
PSP	S. Siddiah	13,849	51.07%	New
INC	T. P. Boraiah	13,268	48.93%	New
Margin of victory		581	2.14%	
Turnout		29,169	57.84%	
Total valid votes		27,117		
Registered electors		50,431		
PSP win (new seat)				
