= Sunil Vallyapure =

Indian politician

Sunil Vallyapur

Deputy Leader of the Opposition Karnataka Legislative Council
- In office 25 December 2023 – 30 June 2026

Member of the Karnataka Legislative Council
- In office 1 July 2020 – 30 June 2026

Minister of Infrastructure Development Government of Karnataka
- In office 2012–2013

Member of the Karnataka Legislative Assembly
- In office 2008–2013
- Preceded by: Vaijnath Patil
- Constituency: Chincholi, Karnataka, India
- In office 2004–2008
- Preceded by: Baburao Chavan
- Constituency: Shahabad, Karnataka, India

Personal details
- Born: 16 February 1966 (age 60) Chandapura
- Party: Bharatiya Janata Party
- Other political affiliations: Karnataka Janata Paksha (2013–2018)
- Children: 2

Sunil Yamanappa Vallyapur is an Indian politician and a member of Karnataka Legislative Council from Bharatiya Janata Party. Sunil Vallyapure is serving as Deputy Leader of the Opposition in Karnataka Legislative Council.

== Early life and education ==
Vallyapure was born to Yamanappa and hails from Koli caste of Chandapur, Chincholi, Karnataka. He completed pre-university education from Sri Siddeshwar Junior College, Bijapur in 1983.

== Positions held ==
- State unit Secretary of the Scheduled Castes Morcha of the BJP 2003
- Member of the Legislative Assembly from Shahabad 2004
- Member of the Legislative Assembly from Chincholi 2008
- Minister of Infrastructure Development for Government of Karnataka 2012
- Member of Legislative Council from Karnataka 2020
- 2023 - Ongoing, Deputy Leader of the Opposition in Karnataka Legislative Council

== MLA election defeat ==
- Member of the Legislative Assembly election 2013 from Chincholi
- Member of the Legislative Assembly election 2018 from Chincholi
