= Byadgi Assembly constituency =

Legislative Assembly constituency in Karnataka State, India

Coordinates: 14.68°N 75.49°E

Byadgi
- Constituency No. 85 for the Karnataka Legislative Assembly

Constituency details
- Country: India
- Region: South India
- State: Karnataka
- District: Haveri
- Lok Sabha constituency: Haveri
- Established: 1961
- Total electors: 208,910
- Reservation: None

Member of Legislative Assembly
- 16th Karnataka Legislative Assembly
- Incumbent Basavaraj Neelappa Shivannanavar
- Party: Indian National Congress
- Elected year: 2023
- Preceded by: Ballary Virupakshappa Rudrappa

Byadgi Assembly constituency is one of the 224 Legislative Assembly constituencies of Karnataka state in India.

It is part of Haveri district. As of 2023, it is represented by Basavaraj Neelappa Shivannanavar of the Indian National Congress party.

== Members of the Legislative Assembly ==
Election	Member	Party
1962	Shiddamma Mahadevappa Mailar	Indian National Congress
1967	B. M. Gadigeppa	Praja Socialist Party
1972	K. F. Patil	Indian National Congress
1978	Malagi Mariyappa Mudakappa	Indian National Congress
1983	Heggappa Deshappa Lamani	Indian National Congress
1985	Beelagi Kallokappa Sabanna	Janata Party
1989	Heggappa Deshappa Lamani	Indian National Congress
1994	Beelagi Kallokappa Sabanna	Janata Dal
1999	Rudrappa Lamani	Indian National Congress
2004	Chanabasappa Nehru Olekar	Bharatiya Janata Party
2008	Sureshagoudra Basalingagoudra Patil	Bharatiya Janata Party
2013	Basavaraj Shivannanavar	Indian National Congress
2018	Ballari Virupakshappa Rudrappa	Bharatiya Janata Party
2023	Basavaraj Shivannanavar	Indian National Congress

== Election results ==
=== Assembly Election 2023 ===
2023 Karnataka Legislative Assembly election : Byadgi
Party	Candidate	Votes	%	±%
INC	Basavaraj Shivannanavar	97,740	55.58%	▲13.35
BJP	Ballari Virupakshappa Rudrappa	73,899	42.02%	▼12.96
NOTA	None of the above	1,491	0.85%	▼0.03
Margin of victory		23,841	13.56%	▲0.81
Turnout		175,934	84.22%	▲1.14
Total valid votes		175,863		
Registered electors		208,910		▲4.00
INC gain from BJP		Swing	▲0.60	

=== Assembly Election 2018 ===
2018 Karnataka Legislative Assembly election : Byadgi
Party	Candidate	Votes	%	±%
BJP	Ballari Virupakshappa Rudrappa	91,721	54.98%	▲26.50
INC	S. R. Patil	70,450	42.23%	▼1.16
NOTA	None of the above	1,469	0.88%	New
Margin of victory		21,271	12.75%	▲2.71
Turnout		166,894	83.08%	▲0.06
Total valid votes		166,833		
Registered electors		200,878		▲11.26
BJP gain from INC		Swing	▲11.59	

=== Assembly Election 2013 ===
2013 Karnataka Legislative Assembly election : Byadgi
Party	Candidate	Votes	%	±%
INC	Basavaraj Shivannanavar	57,707	43.39%	▲3.34
KJP	Shivaraj Sajjanar	44,348	33.35%	New
BJP	Ballari Virupakshappa Rudrappa	37,877	28.48%	▼21.04
Independent	Shivanna Hugar	1,675	1.26%	New
BSRCP	Dadapeer Mardansab Bhoosi	1,563	1.18%	New
Independent	Halappa Timmenahalli	1,438	1.08%	New
JD(S)	Chandrappa Bharamappa Karagi	1,163	0.87%	▼3.31
BSP	Basavantappa Guddappa Gonemmanavar	1,023	0.77%	▼0.71
Margin of victory		13,359	10.04%	▲0.57
Turnout		149,896	83.02%	▲9.10
Total valid votes		132,997		
Registered electors		180,548		▲10.79
INC gain from BJP		Swing	▼6.13	

=== Assembly Election 2008 ===
2008 Karnataka Legislative Assembly election : Byadgi
Party	Candidate	Votes	%	±%
BJP	Sureshagoudra Basalingagoudra Patil	59,642	49.52%	▼3.02
INC	Basavaraj Shivannanavar	48,238	40.05%	▼1.24
JD(S)	Ballari Veeranna Holabasappa	5,031	4.18%	▲1.37
BSP	Kombali Lingappa Shivappa	1,781	1.48%	New
Independent	Hulakellappanavar Devappa Ramappa	1,529	1.27%	New
Independent	Basavantappa Honnappa Hullatti	1,077	0.89%	New
LJP	Talawar Subhasachandra Yellappa	897	0.74%	New
Independent	Dr. V. Jayalaxmi J. Venkatesh	735	0.61%	New
Margin of victory		11,404	9.47%	▼1.78
Turnout		120,464	73.92%	▲0.64
Total valid votes		120,443		
Registered electors		162,964		▲18.99
BJP hold		Swing	▼3.02	

=== Assembly Election 2004 ===
2004 Karnataka Legislative Assembly election : Byadgi
Party	Candidate	Votes	%	±%
BJP	Chanabasappa Nehru Olekar	52,686	52.54%	New
INC	Rudrappa Lamani	41,408	41.29%	▼3.66
JD(S)	Laxman Beelagi. K	2,815	2.81%	▼8.82
Independent	Terdal Sadanand Bheemappa	1,346	1.34%	New
Kannada Nadu Party	Hareeshkumar. V	1,066	1.06%	New
JP	Dyamappa Mudakappa Vinayak	965	0.96%	New
Margin of victory		11,278	11.25%	▼9.89
Turnout		100,352	73.28%	▲1.21
Total valid votes		100,286		
Registered electors		136,952		▲10.27
BJP gain from INC		Swing	▲7.59	

=== Assembly Election 1999 ===
1999 Karnataka Legislative Assembly election : Byadgi
Party	Candidate	Votes	%	±%
INC	Rudrappa Lamani	37,712	44.95%	▲10.40
Independent	Neharu Channabasappa Olekar	19,976	23.81%	New
JD(U)	Kalloleppa Sabanna Beelagi	13,990	16.67%	New
JD(S)	Durgesh Mariyappa Malagi	9,759	11.63%	New
NCP	Heddannavar Neelappa Kannappa	1,155	1.38%	New
Independent	Chennumalligavad	601	0.72%	New
Margin of victory		17,736	21.14%	▲17.49
Turnout		89,515	72.07%	▲2.22
Total valid votes		83,900		
Rejected ballots		5,598	6.25%	▲3.19
Registered electors		124,202		▲7.44
INC gain from JD		Swing	▲6.75	

=== Assembly Election 1994 ===
1994 Karnataka Legislative Assembly election : Byadgi
Party	Candidate	Votes	%	±%
JD	Beelagi Kallokappa Sabanna	29,905	38.20%	▼5.22
INC	Rudrappa Lamani	27,045	34.55%	▼12.78
BJP	Lamani Venkappa Gemanaik	11,669	14.91%	New
INC	Choudappa. B. Malagi	5,300	6.77%	New
KRRS	Kattennavar Devappa Rangappa	2,140	2.73%	New
JP	R. G. Rajendra	726	0.93%	New
Margin of victory		2,860	3.65%	▼0.26
Turnout		80,750	69.85%	▼1.85
Total valid votes		78,278		
Rejected ballots		2,472	3.06%	▼2.45
Registered electors		115,604		▲7.74
JD gain from INC		Swing	▼9.13	

=== Assembly Election 1989 ===
1989 Karnataka Legislative Assembly election : Byadgi
Party	Candidate	Votes	%	±%
INC	Heggappa Deshappa Lamani	34,405	47.33%	▲6.10
JD	Beelagi Kallokappa Sabanna	31,565	43.42%	New
Independent	K. M. Chandrashekharayya	2,793	3.84%	New
JP	Malagi Tirkappa Basappa	1,293	1.78%	New
Independent	Heddannavar Neelappa Kannappa	1,086	1.49%	New
Independent	Vadeyar Venkappa Kallappa	972	1.34%	New
Margin of victory		2,840	3.91%	▼12.63
Turnout		76,932	71.70%	▼1.44
Total valid votes		72,692		
Rejected ballots		4,240	5.51%	▲3.63
Registered electors		107,302		▲21.22
INC gain from JP		Swing	▼10.44	

=== Assembly Election 1985 ===
1985 Karnataka Legislative Assembly election : Byadgi
Party	Candidate	Votes	%	±%
JP	Beelagi Kallokappa Sabanna	36,694	57.77%	▲29.69
INC	Heggappa Deshappa Lamani	26,187	41.23%	▼1.19
Independent	Mallappa Rajappa Hangaji	641	1.01%	New
Margin of victory		10,507	16.54%	▲2.20
Turnout		64,741	73.14%	▲10.30
Total valid votes		63,522		
Rejected ballots		1,219	1.88%	▼1.44
Registered electors		88,519		▲11.95
JP gain from INC		Swing	▲15.35	

=== Assembly Election 1983 ===
1983 Karnataka Legislative Assembly election : Byadgi
Party	Candidate	Votes	%	±%
INC	Heggappa Deshappa Lamani	20,377	42.42%	▲37.90
JP	Beelagi Kallokappa Sabanna	13,488	28.08%	▼6.27
Independent	Malagi Mariyappa Mudakappa	10,204	21.24%	New
Independent	Chalavadi Olekar Nehru Chanabasappa	2,914	6.07%	New
Independent	Shanta Pawadeppa	487	1.01%	New
Independent	Shivannanavar Hanamappa Honnappa	427	0.89%	New
Margin of victory		6,889	14.34%	▼9.60
Turnout		49,688	62.84%	▼5.74
Total valid votes		48,039		
Rejected ballots		1,649	3.32%	▲0.25
Registered electors		79,068		▲10.85
INC gain from INC(I)		Swing	▼15.88	

=== Assembly Election 1978 ===
1978 Karnataka Legislative Assembly election : Byadgi
Party	Candidate	Votes	%	±%
INC(I)	Malagi Mariyappa Mudakappa	27,640	58.30%	New
JP	Annigeri Kariyappa Laxmanappa	16,289	34.35%	New
INC	Hosangadi Keshav Ningappa	2,144	4.52%	▼43.14
Independent	Wadder Alias Wadivar Venkappa Kallappa	1,037	2.19%	New
Independent	H. S. Kankanawadi	304	0.64%	New
Margin of victory		11,351	23.94%	▲6.18
Turnout		48,916	68.58%	▼5.01
Total valid votes		47,414		
Rejected ballots		1,502	3.07%	▲3.07
Registered electors		71,332		▲22.05
INC(I) gain from INC		Swing	▲10.64	

=== Assembly Election 1972 ===
1972 Mysore State Legislative Assembly election : Byadgi
Party	Candidate	Votes	%	±%
INC	K. F. Patil	19,792	47.66%	▲10.56
INC(O)	H. R. Kalineerappa	12,419	29.91%	New
Independent	B. M. Gadigeppa	8,766	21.11%	New
Independent	C. Mahadevaswamigalu	319	0.77%	New
Margin of victory		7,373	17.76%	▼6.55
Turnout		43,011	73.59%	▼0.01
Total valid votes		41,526		
Registered electors		58,445		▲9.54
INC gain from PSP		Swing	▼13.75	

=== Assembly Election 1967 ===
1967 Mysore State Legislative Assembly election : Byadgi
Party	Candidate	Votes	%	±%
PSP	B. M. Gadigeppa	23,055	61.41%	▲21.59
INC	M. S. Mahadevappa	13,928	37.10%	▼23.08
Independent	H. B. Doddirayya	562	1.50%	New
Margin of victory		9,127	24.31%	▲3.96
Turnout		39,268	73.60%	▲4.46
Total valid votes		37,545		
Registered electors		53,354		▲0.89
PSP gain from INC		Swing	▲1.23	

=== Assembly Election 1962 ===
1962 Mysore State Legislative Assembly election : Byadgi
Party	Candidate	Votes	%	±%
INC	Shiddamma Mahadevappa Mailar	21,092	60.18%	New
PSP	Mahadeva Gadigeppa Banakar	13,958	39.82%	New
Margin of victory		7,134	20.35%	
Turnout		36,563	69.14%	
Total valid votes		35,050		
Registered electors		52,885		
INC win (new seat)				

== See also ==
- List of constituencies of the Karnataka Legislative Assembly
- Haveri district
