= Devendrappa Ghalappa Jamadar =

Indian politician

Devendrappa Ghalappa Jamadar is an Indian politician.

He was elected to the Karnataka Legislative Assembly from Chincholi as a member of the Indian National Congress.

Devendrappa was a minister in the Devaraj Urs cabinet and won the Chincholi seat three times in 1972, 1978 and 1983. He belongs to the Kabbaliga community.
