= Gadag Assembly constituency =

Legislative Assembly constituency in Karnataka, India

Coordinates: 15.43°N 75.63°E

Gadag
- Constituency No. 66 for the Karnataka Legislative Assembly

Constituency details
- Country: India
- Region: South India
- State: Karnataka
- District: Gadag
- Lok Sabha constituency: Haveri
- Established: 1951
- Total electors: 222,792
- Reservation: None

Member of Legislative Assembly
- 16th Karnataka Legislative Assembly
- Incumbent H. K. Patil
- Party: Indian National Congress
- Elected year: 2023
- Preceded by: Bidarur Srishailappa Veerupakshappa

Gadag Assembly constituency is one of the 224 constituencies in the Karnataka Legislative Assembly, in India. It is also part of Haveri Lok Sabha constituency.

== Members of the Legislative Assembly ==
Election	Member	Party
1952	Kuberappa Parappa Gadag	Indian National Congress
1957	Kuberappa Parappa Gadag	Indian National Congress
1962	Kuberappa Parappa Gadag	Indian National Congress
1967	Kristagouda Hanamantgouda Patil	Independent politician
1972	Kristagouda Hanamantgouda Patil	Indian National Congress
1978	Muttinapendimath Chanaveerayya Shantayya	Janata Party
1983	Muttinapendimath Chanaveerayya Shantayya	Indian National Congress
1985	Kristagouda Hanamantgouda Patil	Indian National Congress
1989	Kristagouda Hanamantgouda Patil	Indian National Congress
1992 By-election	D. R. Patil	Indian National Congress
1994	D. R. Patil	Indian National Congress
1999	D. R. Patil	Indian National Congress
2004	D. R. Patil	Indian National Congress
2008	Bidarur Srishilappa Veerupakshappa	Bharatiya Janata Party
2013	H. K. Patil	Indian National Congress
2018	H. K. Patil	Indian National Congress
2023	H. K. Patil	Indian National Congress

== Election results ==
=== Assembly Election 2023 ===
2023 Karnataka Legislative Assembly election : Gadag
Party	Candidate	Votes	%	±%
INC	H. K. Patil	89,958	52.84	▲4.43
BJP	Anil. P. Menasinakai	74,828	43.96	▼3.29
NOTA	None of the above	1,543	0.91	▼0.34
Margin of victory		15,130	8.89	▲7.73
Turnout		170,370	76.47	▲3.33
Total valid votes		170,232		
Registered electors		222,792		▲1.47
INC hold		Swing	▲4.43	

=== Assembly Election 2018 ===
2018 Karnataka Legislative Assembly election : Gadag
Party	Candidate	Votes	%	±%
INC	H. K. Patil	77,699	48.41	▲0.11
BJP	Anil. P. Menasinakai	75,831	47.25	▲34.42
NOTA	None of the above	2,007	1.25	New
Margin of victory		1,868	1.16	▼21.96
Turnout		160,598	73.14	▲1.80
Total valid votes		160,490		
Registered electors		219,575		▲14.89
INC hold		Swing	▲0.11	

=== Assembly Election 2013 ===
2013 Karnataka Legislative Assembly election : Gadag
Party	Candidate	Votes	%	±%
INC	H. K. Patil	70,475	48.30	▲5.71
BSRCP	Anil Prakashbabu Mensinkai	36,748	25.19	New
BJP	Bidarur Shreeshailappa Virupaxappa	18,715	12.83	▼37.78
KJP	S. B. Sankannavar	4,808	3.30	New
JD(S)	Andanayya Gurupadayya Kurtakoti	1,339	0.92	▼2.49
Independent	Satyappanavar Bimappa Goneppa	1,062	0.73	New
Margin of victory		33,727	23.12	▲15.11
Turnout		136,345	71.34	▲9.03
Total valid votes		145,905		
Registered electors		191,115		▲10.75
INC gain from BJP		Swing	▼2.31	

=== Assembly Election 2008 ===
2008 Karnataka Legislative Assembly election : Gadag
Party	Candidate	Votes	%	±%
BJP	B. S. Veerupakshappa	54,414	50.61	▲14.27
INC	H. K. Patil	45,798	42.59	▼9.37
JD(S)	Kalasad Shamshuddin Babajan	3,665	3.41	▲0.35
SP	Ashok Mallappa Jawali	2,092	1.95	New
BSP	S. Basavnneyya Hiremath	1,553	1.44	New
Margin of victory		8,616	8.01	▼7.61
Turnout		107,524	62.31	▲0.42
Total valid votes		107,522		
Registered electors		172,571		▲9.71
BJP gain from INC		Swing	▼1.35	

=== Assembly Election 2004 ===
2004 Karnataka Legislative Assembly election : Gadag
Party	Candidate	Votes	%	±%
INC	D. R. Patil	50,580	51.96	▼6.80
BJP	S. B. Sankannavar	35,376	36.34	New
Kannada Nadu Party	Gaddi Vijakumar Fakirappa	5,402	5.55	New
JD(S)	Hebasur Fakkirappa Irappa	2,980	3.06	New
Independent	Mallikarjun Basappa Desai	1,191	1.22	New
JP	Rampur Ramanna Bhimanna	871	0.89	New
Margin of victory		15,204	15.62	▼7.07
Turnout		97,356	61.89	▼5.66
Total valid votes		97,339		
Registered electors		157,301		▲11.24
INC hold		Swing	▼6.80	

=== Assembly Election 1999 ===
1999 Karnataka Legislative Assembly election : Gadag
Party	Candidate	Votes	%	±%
INC	D. R. Patil	53,425	58.76	▲3.26
JD(U)	Chanaveerayya Muttinapendimath	32,794	36.07	New
BSP	Belur Kalmeshwar Hanumappa	2,743	3.02	New
Independent	Satyappanavar Bimappa Goneppa	1,952	2.15	New
Margin of victory		20,631	22.69	▼7.84
Turnout		95,519	67.55	▲5.94
Total valid votes		90,914		
Rejected ballots		4,528	4.74	▲1.95
Registered electors		141,410		▲5.89
INC hold		Swing	▲3.26	

=== Assembly Election 1994 ===
1994 Karnataka Legislative Assembly election : Gadag
Party	Candidate	Votes	%	±%
INC	D. R. Patil	44,388	55.50	▼0.19
JD	Dandin Bistappa Fakeerappa	19,971	24.97	▼10.93
BJP	Pawar Laxmansa Dongarsa	9,883	12.36	▲10.34
INC	Andanappa Veerappa Pattan Shetti	4,347	5.44	New
KRRS	Basavaraj Malakajeppa Konchigeri	876	1.10	New
Margin of victory		24,417	30.53	▲10.74
Turnout		82,275	61.61	▼6.62
Total valid votes		79,979		
Rejected ballots		2,293	2.79	▼2.16
Registered electors		133,545		▲9.23
INC hold		Swing	▼0.19	

=== Assembly Election 1989 ===
1989 Karnataka Legislative Assembly election : Gadag
Party	Candidate	Votes	%	±%
INC	Kristagouda Hanamantgouda Patil	44,155	55.69	▲2.48
JD	Muttinapendimath Chanaveerayya Shantayya	28,463	35.90	New
JP	Shet Srinivasa Bhagirath	2,289	2.89	New
BJP	Chandur. K. V	1,600	2.02	New
Independent	Sankati Hanumantappa Fakirappa	978	1.23	New
Margin of victory		15,692	19.79	▲12.62
Turnout		83,420	68.23	▼5.19
Total valid votes		79,287		
Rejected ballots		4,133	4.95	▲3.21
Registered electors		122,258		▲19.64
INC hold		Swing	▲2.48	

=== Assembly Election 1985 ===
1985 Karnataka Legislative Assembly election : Gadag
Party	Candidate	Votes	%	±%
INC	Kristagouda Hanamantgouda Patil	39,226	53.21	▲7.27
JP	Rotti Gangadharappa	33,943	46.04	▲8.16
Margin of victory		5,283	7.17	▼0.90
Turnout		75,028	73.42	▲12.00
Total valid votes		73,719		
Rejected ballots		1,309	1.74	▼1.71
Registered electors		102,185		▲10.89
INC hold		Swing	▲7.27	

=== Assembly Election 1983 ===
1983 Karnataka Legislative Assembly election : Gadag
Party	Candidate	Votes	%	±%
INC	Muttinapendimath Chanaveerayya Shantayya	25,104	45.94	▲5.40
JP	Desai Hanamantagouda Yallanagouda	20,697	37.88	▼6.53
BJP	Ganachari Huchchappa Ramachandrappa	8,039	14.71	New
Independent	Khanapur Andanappa Mariyappa	458	0.84	New
Independent	Kanavi Mallappa Koteppa	343	0.63	New
Margin of victory		4,407	8.07	▲4.21
Turnout		56,594	61.42	▼17.38
Total valid votes		54,641		
Rejected ballots		1,953	3.45	▲0.19
Registered electors		92,148		▲11.03
INC gain from JP		Swing	▲1.53	

=== Assembly Election 1978 ===
1978 Karnataka Legislative Assembly election : Gadag
Party	Candidate	Votes	%	±%
JP	Muttinapendimath Chanaveerayya Shantayya	28,094	44.41	New
INC	Kristagouda Hanamantgouda Patil	25,649	40.54	▼13.65
INC(I)	Jamadar Mohammad Budan Husainasab	9,205	14.55	New
Margin of victory		2,445	3.86	▼8.81
Turnout		65,396	78.80	
Total valid votes		63,267		
Rejected ballots		2,129	3.26	▲3.26
Registered electors		82,993		▲15.74
JP gain from INC		Swing	▼9.78	

=== Assembly Election 1972 ===
1972 Mysore State Legislative Assembly election : Gadag
Party	Candidate	Votes	%	±%
INC	Kristagouda Hanamantgouda Patil	29,638	54.19	▲9.30
INC(O)	M. V. Rudrappa	22,709	41.52	New
ABJS	H. S. Padmanabhacarya	2,350	4.30	New
Margin of victory		6,929	12.67	▲2.45
Turnout		56,508	78.80	▼2.66
Total valid votes		54,697		
Registered electors		71,709		▲11.45
INC gain from Independent		Swing	▼0.92	

=== Assembly Election 1967 ===
1967 Mysore State Legislative Assembly election : Gadag
Party	Candidate	Votes	%	±%
Independent	Kristagouda Hanamantgouda Patil	27,759	55.11	New
INC	M. V. Rudrappa	22,609	44.89	▼4.30
Margin of victory		5,150	10.22	▲6.76
Turnout		52,410	81.46	▲3.12
Total valid votes		50,368		
Registered electors		64,342		▲26.16
Independent gain from INC		Swing	▲5.92	

=== Assembly Election 1962 ===
1962 Mysore State Legislative Assembly election : Gadag
Party	Candidate	Votes	%	±%
INC	Gadag Kuberappa Parappa	18,539	49.19	▼28.16
Independent	Kristagouda Hanamantgouda Patil	17,234	45.72	New
ABJS	Ramchandra Anantarao Jalihal	1,918	5.09	New
Margin of victory		1,305	3.46	▼60.20
Turnout		39,956	78.34	▲29.72
Total valid votes		37,691		
Registered electors		51,001		▲13.35
INC hold		Swing	▼28.16	

=== Assembly Election 1957 ===
1957 Mysore State Legislative Assembly election : Gadag
Party	Candidate	Votes	%	±%
INC	Gadag Kuberappa Parappa	16,922	77.35	▲17.10
ABJS	Ramchandra Anantarao Jalihal	2,995	13.69	New
Independent	Honnagudi Ishwarappa Kachappa	1,160	5.30	New
Independent	Dandi Hampanna Laxmappa	800	3.66	New
Margin of victory		13,927	63.66	▲43.16
Turnout		21,877	48.62	▼9.70
Total valid votes		21,877		
Registered electors		44,994		▼15.96
INC hold		Swing	▲17.10	

=== Assembly Election 1952 ===
1952 Bombay State Legislative Assembly election : Gadag
Party	Candidate	Votes	%	±%
INC	Gadag Kuberappa Parappa	18,813	60.25	New
Independent	Kashappagouda Sanganagouda Patil	12,412	39.75	New
Margin of victory		6,401	20.50	
Turnout		31,225	58.32	
Total valid votes		31,225		
Registered electors		53,541		
INC win (new seat)				
