= Hangal Assembly constituency =

Seat in the Karnataka Legislative Assembly

Coordinates: 14.77°N 75.13°E

Hanagal
- Constituency No. 82 for the Karnataka Legislative Assembly
- Map of Hangal Taluk and Assembly constituency

Constituency details
- Country: India
- Region: South India
- State: Karnataka
- District: Haveri
- Lok Sabha constituency: Haveri
- Established: 1951
- Total electors: 211,927 (2023)
- Reservation: None

Member of Legislative Assembly
- 16th Karnataka Legislative Assembly
- Incumbent Srinivas Mane
- Party: Indian National Congress
- Elected year: 2023
- Preceded by: C. M. Udasi

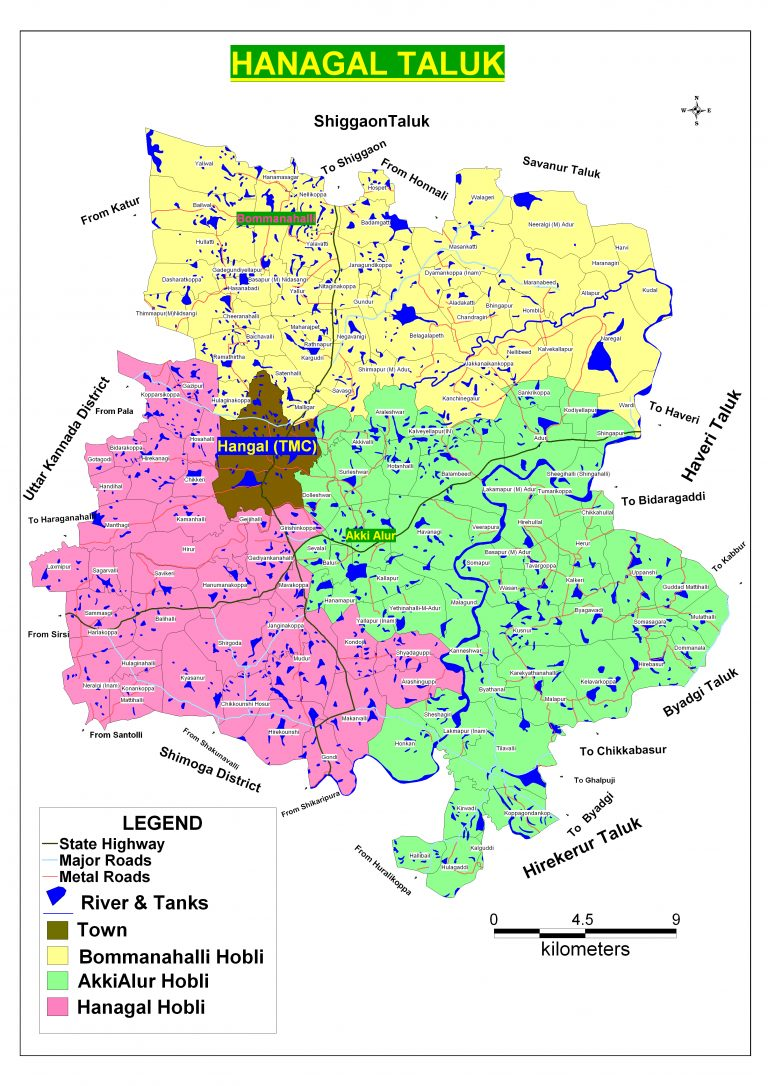

Hangal Assembly constituency is one of the seats in Karnataka Legislative Assembly in India. It is part of Haveri Lok Sabha constituency in Haveri district. It consists of Hangal taluk.

== Members of the Legislative Assembly ==
Election	Member	Party
1952	Sindhur Siddappa Chandbasappa	Indian National Congress
1957	Basanagouda Rudragouda Patil	Independent politician
1962	Gururao Narasingarao Desai	Indian National Congress
1967	Basanagouda Rudragouda Patil	Independent politician
1968 By-election (Note: Due to Death of P. B. Rudragouda)	Gururao Narasingarao Desai	Indian National Congress
1972	S. P. Chandrashekharappa	Indian National Congress
1978	Manohar Tahasildar	Indian National Congress
1983	C. M. Udasi	Independent politician
1985	C. M. Udasi	Janata Party
1989	Manohar Tahasildar	Indian National Congress
1994	C. M. Udasi	Janata Dal
1999	Manohar Tahasildar	Indian National Congress
2004	C. M. Udasi	Bharatiya Janata Party
2008	C. M. Udasi	Bharatiya Janata Party
2013	Manohar Tahasildar	Indian National Congress
2018	C. M. Udasi	Bharatiya Janata Party
2021 By-election (Note: Due to Death of C. M. Udasi)	Srinivas Mane	Indian National Congress
2023	Srinivas Mane	Indian National Congress

== Election results ==
=== Assembly Election 2023 ===
2023 Karnataka Legislative Assembly election : Hangal
Party	Candidate	Votes	%	±%
INC	Srinivas Mane	94,590	52.76%	▲1.66
BJP	Shivaraj Sharanappa Sajjanar	72,645	40.52%	▼6.28
JD(S)	Manohar Tahasildar	8,834	4.93%	▲4.39
NOTA	None of the above	725	0.40%	▲0.09
Margin of victory		21,945	12.24%	▲7.93
Turnout		179,382	84.64%	▲0.92
Total valid votes		179,272		
Registered electors		211,927		▲3.60
INC hold		Swing	▲1.66	

=== Assembly By-election 2021 ===
2021 Karnataka Legislative Assembly by-election : Hangal
Party	Candidate	Votes	%	±%
INC	Srinivas Mane	87,490	51.10%	▲5.97
BJP	Shivaraj Sharanappa Sajjanar	80,117	46.80%	▼2.30
NOTA	None of the above	529	0.31%	▼0.14
Margin of victory		7,373	4.31%	▲0.34
Turnout		171,261	83.72%	▼0.70
Total valid votes		171,197		
Registered electors		204,564		▲5.25
INC gain from BJP		Swing	▲2.00	

=== Assembly Election 2018 ===
2018 Karnataka Legislative Assembly election : Hangal
Party	Candidate	Votes	%	±%
BJP	C. M. Udasi	80,529	49.10%	▲44.40
INC	Srinivas Mane	74,015	45.13%	▲0.94
Independent	Chandrappa Jalagar	4,263	2.60%	New
Independent	Hanamantappa C. Talavar	1,176	0.72%	New
JD(S)	Bommanahalli Babu	1,028	0.63%	▼2.52
NOTA	None of the above	731	0.45%	New
Margin of victory		6,514	3.97%	▲0.18
Turnout		164,082	84.42%	▲1.36
Total valid votes		163,997		
Registered electors		194,354		▲11.74
BJP gain from INC		Swing	▲4.91	

=== Assembly Election 2013 ===
2013 Karnataka Legislative Assembly election : Hangal
Party	Candidate	Votes	%	±%
INC	Manohar Tahasildar	66,324	44.19%	▲0.29
KJP	C. M. Udasi	60,638	40.40%	New
BJP	Basavaraj Hadimani	7,052	4.70%	▼44.00
JD(S)	Mohankumar. B. K	4,723	3.15%	▲0.51
Independent	Shiddappa Kallappa Pujar	2,834	1.89%	New
Independent	Ramu. H. Yallura	2,015	1.34%	New
Margin of victory		5,686	3.79%	▼1.02
Turnout		144,473	83.06%	▲6.80
Total valid votes		150,102		
Registered electors		173,938		▲7.62
INC gain from BJP		Swing	▼4.51	

=== Assembly Election 2008 ===
2008 Karnataka Legislative Assembly election : Hangal
Party	Candidate	Votes	%	±%
BJP	C. M. Udasi	60,025	48.70%	▼2.44
INC	Manohar Tahasildar	54,103	43.90%	▲7.88
JD(S)	A. M. Pathan	3,253	2.64%	▼0.90
SP	Ganter Guddappa Sanna Siddappa	2,924	2.37%	New
Independent	Pundlik. T. Bhadravati	1,240	1.01%	New
BSP	Padeppanavar Nageshappa Shivarudrappa	831	0.67%	▼0.66
Margin of victory		5,922	4.81%	▼10.31
Turnout		123,254	76.26%	▼1.07
Total valid votes		123,242		
Registered electors		161,625		▲4.42
BJP hold		Swing	▼2.44	

=== Assembly Election 2004 ===
2004 Karnataka Legislative Assembly election : Hangal
Party	Candidate	Votes	%	±%
BJP	C. M. Udasi	61,167	51.14%	New
INC	Manohar Tahasildar	43,080	36.02%	▼19.40
Independent	Ganter Guddappa Sanna Siddappa	7,942	6.64%	New
JD(S)	Poojar Ningappa Basappa	4,238	3.54%	▲2.96
BSP	Mohamed Gous Ismail Turewale	1,595	1.33%	New
Kannada Nadu Party	Umesh R. Talwar	996	0.83%	New
Margin of victory		18,087	15.12%	▲0.94
Turnout		119,693	77.33%	▼2.33
Total valid votes		119,601		
Registered electors		154,788		▲12.00
BJP gain from INC		Swing	▼4.28	

=== Assembly Election 1999 ===
1999 Karnataka Legislative Assembly election : Hangal
Party	Candidate	Votes	%	±%
INC	Manohar Tahasildar	59,628	55.42%	▲17.37
JD(U)	C. M. Udasi	44,370	41.24%	New
CPI(M)	Fakkirappa Hotanhalli	2,415	2.24%	New
Margin of victory		15,258	14.18%	▼2.94
Turnout		110,100	79.66%	▼0.02
Total valid votes		107,584		
Rejected ballots		2,516	2.29%	▲0.57
Registered electors		138,206		▲5.95
INC gain from JD		Swing	▲0.26	

=== Assembly Election 1994 ===
1994 Karnataka Legislative Assembly election : Hangal
Party	Candidate	Votes	%	±%
JD	C. M. Udasi	56,348	55.16%	▲14.22
INC	Manohar Tahasildar	38,865	38.05%	▼19.41
BJP	Babji Manjunath Krishnajappa	3,391	3.32%	New
INC	Fakirappa Totappa Ningoji	2,980	2.92%	New
Margin of victory		17,483	17.12%	▲0.61
Turnout		103,935	79.68%	▼4.20
Total valid votes		102,148		
Rejected ballots		1,787	1.72%	▼1.30
Registered electors		130,441		▲11.33
JD gain from INC		Swing	▼2.30	

=== Assembly Election 1989 ===
1989 Karnataka Legislative Assembly election : Hangal
Party	Candidate	Votes	%	±%
INC	Manohar Tahasildar	54,760	57.46%	▲10.22
JD	C. M. Udasi	39,023	40.94%	New
JP	Patil Narayangouda Dyavanagouda	1,525	1.60%	New
Margin of victory		15,737	16.51%	▲12.52
Turnout		98,276	83.88%	▲1.86
Total valid votes		95,308		
Rejected ballots		2,968	3.02%	▲1.44
Registered electors		117,163		▲23.40
INC gain from JP		Swing	▲6.23	

=== Assembly Election 1985 ===
1985 Karnataka Legislative Assembly election : Hangal
Party	Candidate	Votes	%	±%
JP	C. M. Udasi	39,264	51.23%	▲48.74
INC	Manohar Tahasildar	36,205	47.24%	▲6.64
Independent	Angadi Guleppa Rudrappa	531	0.69%	New
Margin of victory		3,059	3.99%	▼11.97
Turnout		77,874	82.02%	▲3.62
Total valid votes		76,643		
Rejected ballots		1,231	1.58%	▼0.77
Registered electors		94,945		▲15.42
JP gain from Independent		Swing	▼5.33	

=== Assembly Election 1983 ===
1983 Karnataka Legislative Assembly election : Hangal
Party	Candidate	Votes	%	±%
Independent	C. M. Udasi	35,617	56.56%	New
INC	Manohar Tahasildar	25,565	40.60%	▲25.04
JP	Patil Shivanagoud Rudragouda	1,568	2.49%	▼15.34
Margin of victory		10,052	15.96%	▼29.87
Turnout		64,489	78.40%	▲3.81
Total valid votes		62,974		
Rejected ballots		1,515	2.35%	▼0.91
Registered electors		82,260		▲7.27
Independent gain from INC(I)		Swing	▼7.10	

=== Assembly Election 1978 ===
1978 Karnataka Legislative Assembly election : Hangal
Party	Candidate	Votes	%	±%
INC(I)	Manohar Tahasildar	35,228	63.66%	New
JP	Malagi Mahamadhusen Maktumhusen	9,866	17.83%	New
INC	Patil Sureshagouda Basanagouda	8,609	15.56%	▼50.03
Independent	Balur Bharamappa Ningappa	866	1.56%	New
Independent	Patil Veeranagouda Shivanagouda	772	1.39%	New
Margin of victory		25,362	45.83%	▲11.63
Turnout		57,203	74.59%	▲1.17
Total valid votes		55,341		
Rejected ballots		1,862	3.26%	▲3.26
Registered electors		76,686		▲14.43
INC(I) gain from INC		Swing	▼1.93	

=== Assembly Election 1972 ===
1972 Mysore State Legislative Assembly election : Hangal
Party	Candidate	Votes	%	±%
INC	S. P. Chandrashekharappa	31,348	65.59%	▲13.50
INC(O)	S. M. Shivalingappa	15,002	31.39%	New
Independent	C. B. Yallappa	806	1.69%	New
ABJS	W. B. Devappawadiyar	636	1.33%	New
Margin of victory		16,346	34.20%	▲16.64
Turnout		49,200	73.42%	
Total valid votes		47,792		
Registered electors		67,015		
INC hold		Swing	▲13.50	

=== Assembly By-election 1968 ===
1968 Mysore State Legislative Assembly by-election : Hangal
Party	Candidate	Votes	%	±%
INC	D. G. Narasingrao	20,759	52.09%	▲7.20
PSP	S. P. Chandrashekharappa	13,762	34.53%	New
SSP	A. M. I. Moulasahab	4,328	10.86%	New
Independent	A. R. Sardar	1,006	2.52%	New
Margin of victory		6,997	17.56%	▲12.31
Total valid votes		39,855		
INC gain from Independent		Swing	▲1.95	

=== Assembly Election 1967 ===
1967 Mysore State Legislative Assembly election : Hangal
Party	Candidate	Votes	%	±%
Independent	P. B. Rudragouda	18,742	50.14%	New
INC	S. S. Chanabasappa	16,781	44.89%	▼6.34
ABJS	I. S. Shivaramashastry	1,859	4.97%	New
Margin of victory		1,961	5.25%	▲2.79
Turnout		40,427	68.87%	▼7.66
Total valid votes		37,382		
Registered electors		58,703		▲11.67
Independent gain from INC		Swing	▼1.09	

=== Assembly Election 1962 ===
1962 Mysore State Legislative Assembly election : Hangal
Party	Candidate	Votes	%	±%
INC	Gururao Narasingarao Desai	19,843	51.23%	▲2.90
PSP	Basanagouda Rudragouda Patil	18,890	48.77%	New
Margin of victory		953	2.46%	▼0.88
Turnout		40,229	76.53%	▲9.73
Total valid votes		38,733		
Registered electors		52,569		▲37.96
INC gain from Independent		Swing	▼0.44	

=== Assembly Election 1957 ===
1957 Mysore State Legislative Assembly election : Hangal
Party	Candidate	Votes	%	±%
Independent	Basanagouda Rudragouda Patil	13,152	51.67%	New
INC	Sindhur Siddappa Chandbasappa	12,303	48.33%	▼25.10
Margin of victory		849	3.34%	▼43.51
Turnout		25,455	66.80%	▲8.90
Total valid votes		25,455		
Registered electors		38,104		▼32.55
Independent gain from INC		Swing	▼21.76	

=== Assembly Election 1952 ===
1952 Bombay State Legislative Assembly election : Hangal
Party	Candidate	Votes	%	±%
INC	Sindhur Siddappa Chandbasappa	24,019	73.43%	New
KMPP	Basanagouda Rudragouda Patil	8,693	26.57%	New
Margin of victory		15,326	46.85%	
Turnout		32,712	57.90%	
Total valid votes		32,712		
Registered electors		56,493		
INC win (new seat)				

== See also ==
- List of constituencies of Karnataka Legislative Assembly
