= Shirahatti Assembly constituency =

Legislative Assembly constituency in Karnataka State, India

Coordinates: 15.23°N 75.58°E

Shirahatti
- Constituency No. 65 for the Karnataka Legislative Assembly

Constituency details
- Country: India
- Region: South India
- State: Karnataka
- District: Gadag
- Lok Sabha constituency: Haveri
- Total electors: 226,999
- Reservation: SC

Member of Legislative Assembly
- 16th Karnataka Legislative Assembly
- Incumbent Chandru Lamani
- Party: Bharatiya Janata Party
- Elected year: 2023
- Preceded by: Ramappa Lamani

Shirahatti Assembly constituency is one of the 224 Legislative Assembly constituencies of Karnataka in India.

It is part of Gadag district and is reserved for candidates belonging to the Scheduled Castes. Chandru Lamani is the current MLA from Shirahatti.

== Members of the Legislative Assembly ==
Election	Member	Party
1952	Magadi, Venkatesh Timmanna	Indian National Congress
1957	Magadi Leelavati Venkatesh	Indian National Congress
1962	Kashimath Shiddaiah Veeraiah	Swatantra Party
1967	Kashimath Shiddaiah Veeraiah	Swatantra Party
1972	W. V. Vadirajcharya	Indian National Congress
1978	Upanal Gulappa Fakeerappa	Indian National Congress
1983	Upanal Gulappa Fakeerappa	Independent politician
1985	Balikai Tippanna Basavanneppa	Janata Party
1989	Patil Shankaragouda Ninganagouda	Indian National Congress
1994	Ganganna Malleshappa Mahantashettar	Janata Dal
1999	Gaddadevaramath Gaddayya Shivamurthyya	Indian National Congress
2004	Gaddadevaramath Gaddayya Shivamurthyya	Indian National Congress
2008	Ramanna Sobeppa Lamani	Bharatiya Janata Party
2013	Doddamani Ramakrishna Shiddlingappa	Indian National Congress
2018	Ramappa Sobeppa Lamani	Bharatiya Janata Party
2023	Dr. Chandru Lamani	Bharatiya Janata Party

== Election results ==
=== Assembly Election 2023 ===
2023 Karnataka Legislative Assembly election : Shirahatti
Party	Candidate	Votes	%	±%
BJP	Dr. Chandru Lamani	74,489	45.43%	▼11.83
Independent	Doddamani Ramakrishna Shiddlingappa	45,969	28.03%	New
INC	Sujata Ningappa Doddamani	34,791	21.22%	▼17.37
JD(S)	Hanamantappa. M. Nayak	2,065	1.26%	New
NOTA	None of the above	1,642	1.00%	▲0.25
Margin of victory		28,520	17.39%	▼1.29
Turnout		164,105	72.29%	▼3.41
Total valid votes		163,974		
Registered electors		226,999		▲6.94
BJP hold		Swing	▼11.83	

=== Assembly Election 2018 ===
2018 Karnataka Legislative Assembly election : Shirahatti
Party	Candidate	Votes	%	±%
BJP	Ramappa Sobeppa Lamani	91,967	57.26%	▲24.67
INC	Doddamani Ramakrishna Shiddlingappa	61,974	38.59%	▲5.77
NOTA	None of the above	1,209	0.75%	New
Margin of victory		29,993	18.68%	▲18.45
Turnout		160,675	75.70%	▲3.82
Total valid votes		160,604		
Registered electors		212,260		▲16.14
BJP gain from INC		Swing	▲24.44	

=== Assembly Election 2013 ===
2013 Karnataka Legislative Assembly election : Shirahatti
Party	Candidate	Votes	%	±%
INC	Doddamani Ramakrishna Shiddlingappa	44,738	32.82%	▲4.53
BJP	Ramappa Sobeppa Lamani	44,423	32.59%	▼5.82
BSRCP	Jayashree Mahantesh Halleppanavar	26,791	19.65%	New
JD(S)	Gurappa Shiddappa Vaddar	5,520	4.05%	▼9.58
KJP	Shobha Krishnappa Lamani	3,841	2.82%	New
Independent	Sandakad Doddahuchappa Doddayallappa	1,947	1.43%	New
Margin of victory		315	0.23%	▼9.89
Turnout		131,376	71.88%	▲8.94
Total valid votes		136,314		
Registered electors		182,768		▲10.74
INC gain from BJP		Swing	▼5.59	

=== Assembly Election 2008 ===
2008 Karnataka Legislative Assembly election : Shirahatti
Party	Candidate	Votes	%	±%
BJP	Ramanna S. Lamani	39,859	38.41%	New
INC	H. R. Nayak	29,358	28.29%	▼9.50
Independent	Jayashree Mahantesh Halleppanavar	16,397	15.80%	New
JD(S)	Alkod Hanumantappa Yallappa	14,144	13.63%	▼9.44
BSP	Ambika Irappa Nayak	1,494	1.44%	New
SP	Kharate Purnajeppa Bharmajeppa	1,448	1.40%	New
Independent	Koradal Shivappa Fakkeerappa	1,079	1.04%	New
Margin of victory		10,501	10.12%	▲6.86
Turnout		103,873	62.94%	▼4.84
Total valid votes		103,779		
Registered electors		165,042		▲23.79
BJP gain from INC		Swing	▲0.62	

=== Assembly Election 2004 ===
2004 Karnataka Legislative Assembly election : Shirahatti
Party	Candidate	Votes	%	±%
INC	Gaddadevaramath Gaddayya Shivamurthyya	34,151	37.79%	▼5.06
JD(U)	Ganganna Malleshappa Mahantashettar	31,205	34.53%	▲18.83
JD(S)	Kappattanavar Vishvanath Virupakshappa	20,845	23.07%	▲11.45
Independent	Rajesh Siddayya Kashimath	1,431	1.58%	New
Urs Samyuktha Paksha	Aramani Chandrashekar Mahadevappa	1,417	1.57%	New
Kannada Nadu Party	Dalayath Khurshidahmad Fakruddin	1,313	1.45%	New
Margin of victory		2,946	3.26%	▼23.89
Turnout		90,371	67.78%	▼2.59
Total valid votes		90,362		
Registered electors		133,322		▲8.72
INC hold		Swing	▼5.06	

=== Assembly Election 1999 ===
1999 Karnataka Legislative Assembly election : Shirahatti
Party	Candidate	Votes	%	±%
INC	Gaddadevaramath Gaddayya Shivamurthyya	34,547	42.85%	▲25.81
JD(U)	Ganganna Malleshappa Mahantashettar	12,659	15.70%	New
JD(S)	Betageri Basappa Ningappa	9,371	11.62%	New
BJP	Jagali Channabasappa Shankarappa	9,206	11.42%	▲8.27
BSP	Basavaraj Murigeppa Hattikal	5,729	7.11%	New
Independent	Swamy Shipramappa Ramappa	4,010	4.97%	New
Independent	Balikayai Thippanna Basavanappa	2,372	2.94%	New
Independent	Shalagara Ahmed Annisab	1,257	1.56%	New
Independent	Chinchalli Gondappa Mallappa	940	1.17%	New
Margin of victory		21,888	27.15%	▲23.50
Turnout		86,295	70.37%	▼0.76
Total valid votes		80,627		
Rejected ballots		5,663	6.56%	▲3.52
Registered electors		122,634		▲9.58
INC gain from JD		Swing	▲8.55	

=== Assembly Election 1994 ===
1994 Karnataka Legislative Assembly election : Shirahatti
Party	Candidate	Votes	%	±%
JD	Ganganna Malleshappa Mahantashettar	26,449	34.30%	▲2.29
Independent	Upanal Gulappa Fakeerappa	23,637	30.66%	New
INC	Patil Shankaragouda Ninganagouda	13,139	17.04%	▼16.55
KRRS	Baligar Shivalingappa Parameshwarappa	4,902	6.36%	New
BJP	N. S. Patil	2,427	3.15%	▲2.48
Independent	Patavegar Sirajudin Miyyasab	1,870	2.43%	New
INC	Fakkirappa Shidramappa Ganji	1,640	2.13%	New
Independent	Hanamant Neelappa Nandennavar	1,319	1.71%	New
Kannada Chalavali Vatal Paksha	Neela. F. Talawar	858	1.11%	New
Margin of victory		2,812	3.65%	▲2.07
Turnout		79,597	71.13%	▼3.52
Total valid votes		77,102		
Rejected ballots		2,419	3.04%	▼2.35
Registered electors		111,908		▲6.69
JD gain from INC		Swing	▲0.71	

=== Assembly Election 1989 ===
1989 Karnataka Legislative Assembly election : Shirahatti
Party	Candidate	Votes	%	±%
INC	Patil Shankaragouda Ninganagouda	24,882	33.59%	▼3.39
JD	Ganganna Malleshappa Mahantashettar	23,715	32.01%	New
Independent	Upanal Gulappa Fakeerappa	19,865	26.82%	New
Kranti Sabha	Batagurki Hanumantappa Nilappa	2,864	3.87%	New
Lok Dal (B)	Shalagar. N. A	995	1.34%	New
JP	Halasur Gurushiddappa Jogeppa	707	0.95%	New
BJP	Kuber Vasudev Subbanna	495	0.67%	New
Margin of victory		1,167	1.58%	▼3.21
Turnout		78,297	74.65%	▲1.64
Total valid votes		74,075		
Rejected ballots		4,222	5.39%	▲3.29
Registered electors		104,887		▲28.55
INC gain from JP		Swing	▼8.18	

=== Assembly Election 1985 ===
1985 Karnataka Legislative Assembly election : Shirahatti
Party	Candidate	Votes	%	±%
JP	Balikai Tippanna Basavanneppa	24,362	41.77%	▲32.35
INC	Patil Shankaragouda Ninganagouda	21,568	36.98%	▼2.10
Independent	Upanal Gulappa Fakeerappa	10,724	18.39%	New
Independent	Konchigeri Basavaraj Malkappa	528	0.91%	New
Independent	Lamani Lalsing Dakappa	402	0.69%	New
Independent	Shirunj Yallappa Hanamappa	383	0.66%	New
Margin of victory		2,794	4.79%	▼5.27
Turnout		59,576	73.01%	▲3.36
Total valid votes		58,326		
Rejected ballots		1,250	2.10%	▼1.07
Registered electors		81,595		▲4.70
JP gain from Independent		Swing	▼7.37	

=== Assembly Election 1983 ===
1983 Karnataka Legislative Assembly election : Shirahatti
Party	Candidate	Votes	%	±%
Independent	Upanal Gulappa Fakeerappa	25,825	49.14%	New
INC	Kulkarni Narayan Gurunath	20,540	39.08%	▲23.33
JP	Baligar Shivappa Veerabhadrappa	4,952	9.42%	▼18.41
Independent	Kadakol Takanagouda Yallappagouda	490	0.93%	New
Margin of victory		5,285	10.06%	▼17.14
Turnout		54,279	69.65%	▼5.86
Total valid votes		52,557		
Rejected ballots		1,722	3.17%	▼0.88
Registered electors		77,930		▲8.61
Independent gain from INC(I)		Swing	▼5.89	

=== Assembly Election 1978 ===
1978 Karnataka Legislative Assembly election : Shirahatti
Party	Candidate	Votes	%	±%
INC(I)	Upanal Gulappa Fakeerappa	28,606	55.03%	New
JP	Noorashettar Irappa Chandabasappa	14,466	27.83%	New
INC	Kappattanavar Virapakshappa Basappa	8,190	15.75%	▼29.53
Independent	Patil Veeranagouda Rudragouda	611	1.18%	New
Margin of victory		14,140	27.20%	▲2.73
Turnout		54,179	75.51%	▲4.13
Total valid votes		51,984		
Rejected ballots		2,195	4.05%	▲4.05
Registered electors		71,750		▲5.35
INC(I) gain from INC		Swing	▲9.75	

=== Assembly Election 1972 ===
1972 Mysore State Legislative Assembly election : Shirahatti
Party	Candidate	Votes	%	±%
INC	W. V. Vadirajcharya	21,314	45.28%	▼3.66
SWA	K. S. Veeraiah	9,797	20.81%	▼30.25
Independent	U. G. Fakirappa	8,711	18.51%	New
INC(O)	G. B. Rajappa	3,430	7.29%	New
Independent	G. B. Ramappa	1,888	4.01%	New
Independent	P. V. Budragouda	1,318	2.80%	New
Independent	I. V. Siddappa	610	1.30%	New
Margin of victory		11,517	24.47%	▲22.34
Turnout		48,615	71.38%	▼6.95
Total valid votes		47,068		
Registered electors		68,107		▲9.76
INC gain from SWA		Swing	▼5.78	

=== Assembly Election 1967 ===
1967 Mysore State Legislative Assembly election : Shirahatti
Party	Candidate	Votes	%	±%
SWA	Kashimath Shiddaiah Veeraiah	23,646	51.06%	▲0.31
INC	M. L. Venkatesh	22,661	48.94%	▼0.31
Margin of victory		985	2.13%	▲0.62
Turnout		48,605	78.33%	▲7.47
Total valid votes		46,307		
Registered electors		62,053		▲21.99
SWA hold		Swing	▲0.31	

=== Assembly Election 1962 ===
1962 Mysore State Legislative Assembly election : Shirahatti
Party	Candidate	Votes	%	±%
SWA	Kashimath Shiddaiah Veeraiah	17,347	50.75%	New
INC	Magadi Leelavati Venkatesh	16,832	49.25%	▼10.86
Margin of victory		515	1.51%	▼28.47
Turnout		36,048	70.86%	▲6.27
Total valid votes		34,179		
Registered electors		50,869		▲18.66
SWA gain from INC		Swing	▼9.36	

=== Assembly Election 1957 ===
1957 Mysore State Legislative Assembly election : Shirahatti
Party	Candidate	Votes	%	±%
INC	Magadi Leelavati Venkatesh	16,644	60.11%	▲6.63
Independent	Kashimath Siddaya Veerayya	8,343	30.13%	New
Independent	Ranade Hanumanta Chintamani	2,703	9.76%	New
Margin of victory		8,301	29.98%	▲2.73
Turnout		27,690	64.59%	▲0.31
Total valid votes		27,690		
Registered electors		42,868		▼24.84
INC hold		Swing	▲6.63	

=== Assembly Election 1952 ===
1952 Bombay State Legislative Assembly election : Shirahatti
Party	Candidate	Votes	%	±%
INC	Magadi, Venkatesh Timmanna	19,604	53.48%	New
KMPP	Salimath, Shivilingappa Shivapujaya	9,613	26.22%	New
Independent	Meti, Mallangouda Adiveppa	5,608	15.30%	New
FBL(MG)	Hesarur, Tajuddinsab Rajesab	1,507	4.11%	New
Independent	Bhorshetli, Fakirappa Shidhappa	326	0.89%	New
Margin of victory		9,991	27.25%	
Turnout		36,658	64.28%	
Total valid votes		36,658		
Registered electors		57,032		
INC win (new seat)				

== See also ==
- List of constituencies of the Karnataka Legislative Assembly
- Gadag district
