= Basavaraj Shivannanavar =

Indian politician (born 1956)

Basavaraj Neelappa Shivannanavar (born 1956) is an Indian politician from Karnataka. He is a member of the Karnataka Legislative Assembly from Bydagi Assembly constituency in Haveri district. He won the 2023 Karnataka Legislative Assembly election representing the Indian National Congress.

== Early life and education ==
Shivannanavar is from Byadagi, Haveri district, Karnataka. His father Neelappa Basappa Shivannanavar was a farmer. He completed his B.A. in 1978 at G.H College which is affiliated with Karnatak University, Dharwad.

== Career ==
Shivannanavar won from Bydagi Assembly constituency representing the Indian National Congress in the 2023 Karnataka Legislative Assembly election. He polled 97,740 votes and defeated his nearest rival and sitting MLA, Ballari Virupakshappa Rudrappa of the Bharatiya Janata Party, by a margin of 23,841 votes. He first became an MLA winning the 2013 Karnataka Legislative Assembly election and regained the Bydagi seat in the 2023 Assembly election. In 2013, he polled 57,707 votes and defeated his nearest opponent, Shivaraj Sajjanar of the Karnataka Janata Paksha, by a margin of 13,359 votes. Sajjanar got 44,348 votes.

He was Appointed as chairman for Forest Development Corporation on 26 January 2024.
