= Srinivas Mane =

Indian politician

Member of Karnataka Legislative Assembly
- Incumbent
- Assumed office 2 November 2021
- Preceded by: C. M. Udasi
- Constituency: Hangal

Member of Karnataka Legislative Council
- In office 6 January 2010 – 2 November 2021
- Preceded by: Abdul Hakim M. Hindasagari
- Succeeded by: Saleem Ahmed
- Constituency: Dharwad Local Authorities

Personal details
- Born: Srinivas Mane; 6 August 1974 (age 51) Nippani, Karnataka
- Party: Indian National Congress
- Spouse: Usha Mane
- Children: Suraj, Vishal
- Parent(s): Vishnurao Mane, Nirmala Mane
- Occupation: Politician

Srinivas Mane is an Indian politician and Member of Legislative Assembly (MLA) representing Hangal (Vidhana Sabha constituency) in the Karnataka Legislative Assembly in India. He was elected on 2 November 2021.

He was also the Member of Legislative Council (MLC) representing Dharwad Local Authorities constituency in the Karnataka Legislative Council from 2010 to 2021 and the Vice president of Karnataka Pradesh Youth congress committee.
