= Bestha =

Bestha is a major caste in Karnataka, Telangana and Andhra Pradesh in southern India. The major occupation of this community is fishing and boating.

The Bestha population in Telangana are much involved with fish farming in tanks and lakes.
