= Manohar Tahasildar =

Indian politician (1946–2024)

Minister of Excise and Muzrai of Karnataka
- In office 29 October 2015 – 19 June 2016
- Preceded by: Satish Jarkiholi
- Succeeded by: H. Y. Meti

Member of the Karnataka Legislative Assembly for Hangal
- In office May 2013 – May 2018
- Preceded by: C. M. Udasi
- Succeeded by: C. M. Udasi
- In office 1999–2004
- Preceded by: C. M. Udasi
- Succeeded by: C. M. Udasi
- In office 1989–1994
- Preceded by: C. M. Udasi
- Succeeded by: C. M. Udasi
- In office 1978–1983
- Preceded by: S. P. Chandrashekharappa
- Succeeded by: C. M. Udasi

Personal details
- Born: 21 July 1946 Harihar, Kingdom of Mysore, British Raj (present–day Karnataka, India)
- Died: 18 November 2024 (aged 78) Bengaluru, Karnataka, India
- Party: Bharatiya Janata Party (2 March 2024 – 18 November 2024)
- Occupation: Politician

Manohar Tahsildar (21 July 1946 – 18 November 2024) was an Indian politician from the state of Karnataka.

== Life and career ==
Tahsildar was a member of the Indian National Congress. He contested every Karnataka Vidhan Sabha election from 1978 to 2013 from Hangal constituency, winning the seat in 1978, 1989, 1999, and 2013. He lost from Hangal five times to C M Udasi, in 1983, 1985, 1994, 2004, 2008. He did not contest 2018 Vidhan Sabha Election.

He served as the Deputy Speaker from 30 October 1999 to 23 February 2004 and Minister for Excise and Muzrai in the Siddaramaiah-led government between 29 October 2015 and 19 June 2016. He Joined BJP in March 2024.

Tahasildar died in Bengaluru on 18 November 2024, at the age of 78. He is survived by three sons and two daughters.
