= Chandru Lamani =

Indian politician

Chandru Lamani (born 1989) is an Indian politician from Karnataka. He is an MLA from Shirahatti Assembly constituency which is reserved for Scheduled Caste community in Gadag district. He won the 2023 Karnataka Legislative Assembly election representing the Bharatiya Janata Party.

== Early life and education ==
Lamani is from Shirahatti, Gadag district. He is the son of Kuberappa Lamani. He is a doctor. He completed his M.D. in 2018 at ESI Post Graduate Institute of Medical Science and Research, Bangalore, which is affiliated with Rajiv Gandhi University of Health Sciences, Karnataka.

== Career ==
Lamani won from Shirahatti Assembly constituency representing the Bharatiya Janata Party in the 2023 Karnataka Legislative Assembly election. He polled 74,489 votes and defeated his nearest rival, Ramakrishna Shidlingappa Doddamani, an independent candidate, by a margin of 28,520 votes.

Chandru Lamani, along with 17 other BJP MLAs, was suspended by Karnataka's Legislative Assembly Speaker U. T. Khader for a period of six months for allegedly showing disrespect to the speaker's chair and also demonstrating unruly behaviour, while demanding a probe into a purported "honey trap" attempt involving a minister and other politicians. They allegedly climbed up to the speaker's chair and threw papers at him on the last day of the budget session on 22 March 2025.
