= C. M. Udasi =

Indian politician (1937–2021)

Channabasappa Mahalingappa Udasi

Cabinet Minister Government of Karnataka
- In office 30 May 2008 – 23 January 2013
- Ministry: Term
- Minister of Public Works Department: 30 May 2008 - 23 January 2013
- In office 18 February 2006 – 8 October 2007
- Ministry: Term
- Minister of Rural Development & Panchayat Raj: 18 February 2006 - 8 October 2007

Member of Karnataka Legislative Assembly
- In office 2018–2021
- Preceded by: Manohar Tahasildar
- Succeeded by: Srinivas Mane
- Constituency: Hangal
- In office 2004–2013
- Preceded by: Manohar Tahasildar
- Succeeded by: Manohar Tahasildar
- Constituency: Hangal
- In office 1994–1999
- Preceded by: Manohar Tahasildar
- Succeeded by: Manohar Tahasildar
- Constituency: Hangal
- In office 1983–1989
- Preceded by: Manohar Tahasildar
- Succeeded by: Manohar Tahasildar
- Constituency: Hangal

Personal details
- Born: 2 February 1937 Hangal
- Died: 8 June 2021 (aged 84) Bengaluru
- Party: Bharatiya Janata Party
- Other political affiliations: Janata Party; Janata Dal; Janata Dal (United); Karnataka Janata Paksha
- Profession: Agriculturist

Channabasappa Mahalingappa Udasi (1937–2021) was an Indian politician from Karnataka, who was once with Janata Dal, and later with Bharatiya Janata Party at the time of his death. He joined BJP in 2004. Later he had left BJP briefly and joined Yediyurappa's Karnataka Janata Paksha in 2013.

Udasi contested every Karnataka Vidhan Sabha election from Hangal (constituency) from 1983 to 2018. He was elected in 1983, 1985, 1994, 2004, 2008 and 2018. He lost in 1989, 1999, 2013, each time to Manohar Tahasildar. Five of his six wins were gained by defeating Tahasildar.

Udasi was the minister of rural development and Panchayati raj, minister of minor irrigation, minister for handlooms and textiles, and public works department under three Chief Ministers J. H. Patel, Ramakrishna Hegde and B. S. Yediyurappa. Udasi died from age related factors aged 84.
