= K. B. Shanappa =

Indian politician (1938–2021)

- Born: 16 May 1938; Shahabad, Gulbarga
- Died: 9 May 2021 (aged 82); Gulbarga

Kamalar Bhimsha Shanappa (16 May 1938 – 9 May 2021) was an Indian politician from the State of Karnataka.

== Biography ==
As member of the Bharatiya Janata Party, he was nominated to the Karnataka Legislative Council, the upper house of the Karnataka Legislature, in 2012, and remained a member till 2018. Between 2006 and 2012, he represented Karnataka in Rajya Sabha, the upper house of the Indian Parliament. Shanappa was a member of the Janata Dal till 1998, when he quit to join Lok Shakti.

Shanappa died on 9 May 2021, aged 83. Having tested positive for COVID-19 and developed complications, he had been hospitalised. He was survived by his wife, two daughters and two sons.
