= Vaijnath Patil =

Indian politician and social worker (1938–2019)

Vaijanath Patil

Member of Legislative Council Karnataka
- In office 1984–1990

Member of Legislative Assembly Karnataka
- In office 1994–1999
- Preceded by: Veerendra Patil
- Constituency: Chincholi, Karnataka
- In office 2004–2008
- Preceded by: Kailashnath Patil
- Constituency: Chincholi, Karnataka

Minister of Horticulture of Karnataka
- In office 1984–1989

Minister of Urban Development excluding Bengaluru city of Karnataka
- In office 1994–1999

Personal details
- Born: 29 July 1938 Hakkyal
- Died: 2 November 2019 (aged 81)
- Party: Indian National Congress (1999 - 2008, 8 August 2013 – 11 March 2019)
- Other political affiliations: Bharatiya Janata Party (2008 - 2013); Karnataka Janata Paksha (2013 - 2013); Janata Dal (1990–1999); Janata Party (1977–1990)
- Education: BVB degree college Bidar (1964), SSL law college Gulbarga (1968)

Vaijanath Sangappa Patil (29 July 1938 – 2 November 2019) was an Indian politician and social worker who was the Minister of state for Minister of Urban Development (excluding Bangalore) of Karnataka from 1994 to 1999. He was also Minister of Horticulture of Karnataka from 1984 to 1989.

== Early life and education ==
Patil was born on 29 July 1938 in agricultural family at Hakyala village of Aurad taluk Bidar district. He completed his BA at BVB degree college Bidar, and LLB from SSL law college in Gulbarga. For his service to society Gulbarga University conferred an honorary doctorate upon him during its 31st Annual Convocation.

== Politics ==
He served as Minister for Horticulture in the Ramakrishna Hegde government in 1984 and as Urban Development Minister in the Deve Gowda government in 1994. Vaijnath Patil was elected MLA from Chincholi constituency two times and MLC from Gulbarga constituency.
