= 1972 Mysore State Legislative Assembly election =

1972 Mysore Legislative Assembly election
- 1972

All 216 seats in the Mysore Legislative Assembly 109 seats needed for a majority
	First party	Second party
		INC(O)
Party	INC(R)	INC(O)
Last election	126	Party did not exist
Seats won	165	24
Seat change	▲39	▲24
Popular vote	4,698,824	2,361,308
Percentage	52.17%	26.22%
Swing	▲3.74%	▲26.22%
Chief Minister of Mysore before election
President's rule
Chief Minister of Mysore
D. Devaraj Urs
INC

The 1972 Mysore State Legislative Assembly election was held in the Indian state of Mysore (currently Karnataka) to elect 216 members to the Mysore Legislative Assembly. Indian National Congress (Requisitionists) allied with Communist Party of India. D. Devaraj Urs of INC(R) and M. S. Krishnan of CPI came together and forged a pre-pol alliance.

== Results ==
Summary of results of the Mysore Legislative Assembly election, 1972
Political party	Contestants	Seats won	Seat change	Votes	Vote share	Net change
Indian National Congress (Requisitionists)	212	165	▲39	4,698,824	52.17%	▲3.74%
Indian National Congress (Organisation)	176	24		2,361,308	26.22%	▲26.22%
Communist Party of India	4	3		88,978	0.99%	
Samyukta Socialist Party	29	3	▼3	152,556	1.69%	▼0.78%
Janata Paksha Party	2	1		14,390	0.16%	
Independents		20	▼21	1,159,383	12.87%	
Total		216				

=== District wise results ===
District	Seats				
District	Seats	INC(R)	INC(O)	IND	OTH
Bidar	6	4	—N/a	1	1
Gulbarga	13	10	1	2	—N/a
Raichur	10	9	1	—N/a	—N/a
Bellary	8	6	2	—N/a	—N/a
Chitradurga	10	9	—N/a	1	—N/a
Tumkur	13	11	2	—N/a	—N/a
Kolar	12	6	1	5	—N/a
Bangalore	23	14	1	6	2
Mandya	8	7	1	—N/a	—N/a
Mysore	16	12	3	1	—N/a
Kodagu	3	3	—N/a	—N/a	—N/a
Hassan	8	4	3	1	—N/a
Dakshina Kannada	14	13	—N/a	—N/a	1
Chikmagalur	6	6	—N/a	—N/a	—N/a
Shimoga	9	6	—N/a	—N/a	3
Uttara Kannada	6	6	—N/a	—N/a	—N/a
Dharwad	18	17	1	—N/a	—N/a
Belagavi	18	12	3	3	—N/a
Bijapur	15	10	5	—N/a	—N/a
Total	216	165	24	20	7

=== Results by constituency ===
District	Constituency		Turnout	Winner				Runner-up				Margin
District	No.	Name	%	Candidate	Party	Votes	%	Candidate	Party	Votes	%	Margin
Bidar	1	Aurad	66.02	Bapurao Patil	Ind	22,431	41.25	Manik Patil	INC(O)	18,570	34.15	3,861
Bidar	2	Bhalki	44.52	Subhash Asture	INC	22,561	73.11	Heerachand Waghmare	SSP	7,628	24.72	14,933
Bidar	3	Hulsoor	30.59	Mahendra Kallappa	INC	13,282	67.13	Maruthi Devendra	SSP	4,159	21.02	9,123
Bidar	4	Bidar	54.67	Manikrao R. Phuleker	INC	16,562	41.08	G. Madivalappa Kheny	Ind	14,253	35.35	2,309
Bidar	5	Humnabad	57.27	V. N. Patil Neelappa	CPI	14,376	33.95	Manik Ramanna	INC(O)	13,935	32.91	441
Bidar	6	Basavakalyan	60.59	Bapurao Rao	INC	24,995	55.10	Sidramappa Sanganbasappa	Ind	20,367	44.90	4,628
Gulbarga	7	Chincholi	55.80	Devendrappa G. Jamadar	INC	24,364	59.52	C. P. Baswantrao Patil	INC(O)	15,322	37.43	9,042
Gulbarga	8	Kamalapur	49.38	Subhash Shankershetty	INC	22,196	70.31	Hanmanth Sharnappa	SSP	9,375	29.69	12,821
Gulbarga	9	Aland	67.55	Anna Veerbhadrappa	INC	32,181	73.78	Anna Rao	INC(O)	10,721	24.58	21,460
Gulbarga	10	Gulbarga	61.45	Mohammed Ali	INC	22,657	47.97	A. Sharma Jaitirthachary	BJS	11,663	24.70	10,994
Gulbarga	11	Afzalpur	54.29	Digambar Balwantrao	INC	19,729	53.23	Anna Madiwalappa	INC(O)	17,333	46.77	2,396
Gulbarga	12	Kalgi	41.80	Prabhaker Telker	INC	14,707	50.28	Shivalingappa	INC(O)	12,485	42.68	2,222
Gulbarga	13	Chittapur	47.19	Vijay Desai	INC	18,392	52.51	B. Revansidappa Kanta	INC(O)	14,119	40.31	4,273
Gulbarga	14	Sedam	53.55	Papiah Jamadanda	INC	15,682	49.80	Bhojappa Mogalappa	INC(O)	14,713	46.72	969
Gulbarga	15	Jevargi	50.96	O. S. Narayan Singh	INC	20,500	57.99	Mahadevappa Yeshwantrao	INC(O)	13,896	39.31	6,604
Gulbarga	16	Gurmitkal	37.87	Mallikarjun Kharge	INC	16,796	62.68	Murtheppa	Ind	7,356	27.45	9,440
Gulbarga	17	Yadgir	58.84	Vishwanath Reddy	Ind	21,068	49.44	Shivanna	INC	20,423	47.93	645
Gulbarga	18	Shahapur	52.60	Bapu Rayappa	INC(O)	19,575	53.79	H. G. Ramayyagouda	INC	16,819	46.21	2,756
Gulbarga	19	Shorapur	45.91	Raja Pidnaik	Ind	16,541	54.18	Abbas Ali	INC	8,648	28.33	7,893
Raichur	20	Devadurga	46.78	Sharanappa	INC(O)	12,795	42.01	Ambanna	INC	10,579	34.73	2,216
Raichur	21	Raichur	44.12	Nazeer Siddiqui	INC	13,953	45.50	Sangameshwar Sardar	INC(O)	10,575	34.48	3,378
Raichur	22	Kalmala	32.16	Shivanna Bheemappa	INC	11,167	60.38	B. Nagamma Seshappa	INC(O)	6,307	34.10	4,860
Raichur	23	Manvi	53.55	Bhimanna Narsappa	INC	22,434	61.53	A. B. Patel	INC(O)	13,142	36.05	9,292
Raichur	24	Lingsugur	50.41	Chandrasekar N. Patil	INC	22,223	62.96	Mallangouda Sangangouda	INC(O)	12,348	34.98	9,875
Raichur	25	Sindhanur	63.06	Baswantrao Bassanagouda	INC	25,599	58.54	Amare Gouda	CPI(M)	18,130	41.46	7,469
Raichur	26	Kushtagi	58.64	Kantha Desai	INC	23,144	55.88	B. Sharanabasvaraj	INC(O)	16,201	39.12	6,943
Raichur	27	Yelburga	48.13	Prabhuraj L. Patil	INC	24,430	70.15	A. G. Virupakshagouda Patil	INC(O)	9,005	25.86	15,425
Raichur	28	Gangawati	66.06	H. R. Sriramulu	INC	38,967	65.85	Pampanagouda Basanagouda	INC(O)	20,209	34.15	18,758
Raichur	29	Koppal	56.12	M. Virupakshappa Shivappa	INC	32,218	76.49	B. Mudieppa Ballolli	INC(O)	8,379	19.89	23,839
Bellary	30	Siruguppa	69.29	B. E. Ramaiah	INC	27,600	58.40	M. Doudangowd	INC(O)	19,659	41.60	7,941
Bellary	31	Kurugodu	71.43	H. Linga Reddy	INC	26,914	55.56	Allum Veerabhadrappa	INC(O)	21,531	44.44	5,383
Bellary	32	Bellary	63.41	V. Nagappa	INC(O)	25,866	49.71	K. Bhasker Naidu	INC	23,024	44.25	2,842
Bellary	33	Hospet	68.53	N. Chikkegowda	INC	40,227	80.22	B. Satyanarayana Singh	INC	26,717	53.28	13,510
Bellary	34	Sandur	66.30	M. Y. Ghorpade	INC	26,030	60.43	Yali Thimmappa	INC(O)	16,608	38.56	9,422
Bellary	35	Kudligi	67.71	B. S. Veerabhadrappa	INC(O)	34,110	69.38	P. J. Krishnavarma Raju	INC	15,056	30.62	19,054
Bellary	36	Hadagali	73.09	Andaneppa C.	INC	31,859	60.32	N. M. Kotrabasavaiah Sogi	INC(O)	20,956	39.68	10,903
Bellary	37	Harapanahalli	59.47	Dinarayanada	INC	28,033	60.33	B. Y. Nemya Naik	INC(O)	16,939	36.45	11,094
Chitradurga	38	Harihar	72.08	H. Siddhaveerappa	INC	35,620	55.55	Ganji Veerappa	INC(O)	26,704	41.65	8,916
Chitradurga	39	Davanagere	57.46	Nagamma C. Keshavamurthy	INC	33,163	70.70	K. G. Maheshwarappa	SSP	10,113	21.56	23,050
Chitradurga	40	Bharamasagara	51.35	H. B. Lakshmana	Ind	11,871	32.12	T. Chowdaiah	INC	11,637	31.48	234
Chitradurga	41	Chitradurga	57.11	C. R. Mohammad Saifuddin	INC	23,057	58.10	T. M. K. Peer Sab	INC(O)	9,665	24.36	13,392
Chitradurga	42	Jagalur	64.04	G. H. Ashwath Reddy	INC	26,132	55.31	B. H. Sreenivasa Naik	INC(O)	18,010	38.12	8,122
Chitradurga	43	Molakalmuru	67.27	Papanaik	INC	28,038	59.38	H. C. Boraiah	INC(O)	19,183	40.62	8,855
Chitradurga	44	Challakere	59.17	V. Masiyappa	INC	23,643	55.96	H. C. Shivashankarappa	INC(O)	16,798	39.76	6,845
Chitradurga	45	Hiriyur	54.47	K. H. Ranganath	INC	33,314	84.88	P. Rangappa	INC(O)	5,933	15.12	27,381
Chitradurga	46	Holalkere	71.70	B. Parameswarappa	INC	29,587	57.84	M. B. Thipperudrappa	INC(O)	21,566	42.16	8,021
Chitradurga	47	Hosadurga	66.40	M. V. Rudrappa	INC	31,375	63.36	G. Basappa	INC(O)	18,141	36.64	13,234
Tumkur	48	Pavagada	42.93	K. R. Thimmarayappa	INC	26,245	76.84	P. Anajanappa	Ind	4,853	14.21	21,392
Tumkur	49	Sira	61.72	B. Puttakamaiah	INC	22,669	54.20	P. Mudle Gowda	Ind	16,796	40.16	5,873
Tumkur	50	Kallambella	64.45	T. Taregowda	INC	17,862	43.75	B. Ganganna	Ind	7,929	19.42	9,933
Tumkur	51	Gubbi	60.62	Gatti Chandrasekhar	INC	24,214	58.49	S. Revanna	INC(O)	17,187	41.51	7,027
Tumkur	52	Chikkanayakanahalli	64.49	N. Basavaiah	INC(O)	21,335	50.90	A. B. Mariappa	INC	19,445	46.39	1,890
Tumkur	53	Tiptur	70.82	T. M. Manjanath	INC(O)	33,192	61.17	V. L. Sivappa	INC	15,287	28.17	17,905
Tumkur	54	Turuvekere	73.11	B. Byrappaji	INC	30,990	64.18	T. Sivanna	INC(O)	16,157	33.46	14,833
Tumkur	55	Kunigal	62.60	Andanaiah	INC	23,499	67.72	Mohammad Khan	INC(O)	11,200	32.28	12,299
Tumkur	56	Huliyurdurga	66.63	N. Huchamasti Gowda	INC	27,591	69.99	D. T. Mayanna	INC(O)	11,828	30.01	15,763
Tumkur	57	Gulur	55.26	Dodda Thimmaiah	INC	18,307	52.59	Gangabovi	INC(O)	15,448	44.38	2,859
Tumkur	58	Tumkur	53.33	K. Abdul Subhan	INC	11,547	34.55	S. Mallikarjunaiah	BJS	9,464	28.32	2,083
Tumkur	59	Koratagere	55.65	Mudduramaiah	INC	20,998	51.30	T. H. Hanumantharayappa	Ind	7,564	18.48	13,434
Tumkur	60	Madhugiri	66.60	Chikkaiah R.	INC	24,071	55.34	M. N. Nagabhushana	INC(O)	19,425	44.66	4,646
Kolar	61	Gowribidanur	69.84	V. Krishna Rao	INC	30,469	59.90	R. N. Lakshmipathi	INC(O)	19,556	38.45	10,913
Kolar	62	Chikballapur	68.09	C. V. Venkatarayappa	INC	27,804	55.83	R. B. Pillappa	Ind	20,733	41.63	7,071
Kolar	63	Sidlaghatta	77.88	J. Venkatappa	INC	31,308	60.81	B. Venkatarayappa	Ind	16,874	32.78	14,434
Kolar	64	Bagepalli	45.23	Renuka Rajendran	INC	19,461	55.00	A. Muniyappa	Ind	6,890	19.47	12,571
Kolar	65	Chintamani	72.26	Chowda Reddy	Ind	30,277	53.73	V. Seethappa	INC	22,402	39.75	7,875
Kolar	66	Srinivasapur	59.90	S. Bachi Reddy	INC(O)	29,616	71.63	Syed Aleem	INC	11,728	28.37	17,888
Kolar	67	Mulbagal	50.17	P. Muniyappa	Ind	17,112	47.18	Buchappa	INC(O)	11,097	30.59	6,015
Kolar	68	Kolar Gold Field	69.75	C. M. Armugam	Ind	16,077	43.06	A. K. Selvaraj	INC	14,317	38.35	1,760
Kolar	69	Bethamangala	63.73	K. M. Doreswamy Naidu	Ind	20,380	56.92	K. C. Venkatesh	INC	14,490	40.47	5,890
Kolar	70	Kolar	49.64	D. Venkataramiah	INC	14,639	47.53	P. Venkatagiriappa	Ind	13,147	42.69	1,492
Kolar	71	Vemagal	69.86	C. Byre Gowda	Ind	21,258	51.49	S. Govinda Gowda	INC	20,031	48.51	1,227
Kolar	72	Malur	64.56	A. V. Muniswamy	INC	23,581	58.30	H. C. Linga Reddy	Ind	15,605	38.58	7,976
Bangalore	73	Malleshwaram	50.73	M. S. Krishnan	CPI	31,925	53.56	P. Ramdev	Ind	13,506	22.66	18,419
Bangalore	74	Gandhi Nagar	52.97	K. Sreeramulu	INC	12,812	34.26	S. E. Venugopal	Ind	11,535	30.84	1,277
Bangalore	75	Chickpet	46.99	K. M. Naganna	JPP	8,936	35.53	Kalapanda Thimmaiah	INC	7,714	30.67	1,222
Bangalore	76	Chamrajpet	55.83	Vatal Nagaraj	Ind	15,456	29.32	R. Dayananda Sagar	INC	14,412	27.34	1,044
Bangalore	77	Fort	53.01	T. R. Shamanna	Ind	13,625	33.13	D. S. Narasinga Rao	INC	11,209	27.26	2,416
Bangalore	78	Basavanagudi	50.05	Amir Khan	INC	15,320	33.80	S. P. Rajanna	INC(O)	11,126	24.55	4,194
Bangalore	79	Shivajinagar	42.67	S. Hameed Shah	INC	12,989	44.59	A. Azeez Menon	Ind	7,267	24.95	5,722
Bangalore	80	Bharathinagar	52.87	D. Poosalingam	Ind	15,810	40.95	C. Sharada	INC	13,450	34.84	2,360
Bangalore	81	Shanti Nagar	48.53	K. R. Sreenivasulu Nayudu	INC	14,346	41.53	V. Shivashankara	Ind	10,342	29.94	4,004
Bangalore	82	Yelahanka	50.09	A. M. Suryanarayana Gowda	INC	18,751	58.12	B. V. Ramachandra Reddy	INC(O)	8,793	27.25	9,958
Bangalore	83	Uttarahalli	49.23	B. Basavalingappa	INC	21,903	63.29	Y. Ramakrishna	INC(O)	12,704	36.71	9,199
Bangalore	84	Varthur	40.49	K. Prabhakar	INC	19,774	60.36	D. Munichinnappa	INC(O)	11,500	35.11	8,274
Bangalore	85	Kanakapura	64.00	S. Kariyappa	INC	25,121	66.74	K. G. Srinivasmurthy	INC(O)	12,517	33.26	12,604
Bangalore	86	Sathanur	58.76	H. Puttadasa	INC	23,740	70.62	G. C. Chandrasekhar	INC(O)	9,878	29.38	13,862
Bangalore	87	Channapatna	64.21	T. V. Krishnappa	INC	29,120	54.64	Sivvaramaiah	INC(O)	20,656	38.76	8,464
Bangalore	88	Ramanagara	66.27	B. Puttaswamaiah	INC(O)	26,775	56.07	A. K. Abdul Samad	INC	20,978	43.93	5,797
Bangalore	89	Magadi	63.20	H. G. Channappa	Ind	19,948	50.74	C. R. Range Gowda	INC(O)	9,738	24.77	10,210
Bangalore	90	Kudur	70.01	Bettaswamy Gowda	Ind	24,848	58.38	T. D. Maranna	INC	17,715	41.62	7,133
Bangalore	91	Nelamangala	59.50	H. Maregowda	Ind	21,977	56.57	T. V. Manumantharaju	INC	16,871	43.43	5,106
Bangalore	92	Doddaballapur	63.94	G. Rame Gowda	INC	36,196	75.34	D. Pillegowda	BJS	10,086	20.99	26,110
Bangalore	93	Devanahalli	65.52	M. R. Jayaram	INC	28,211	53.36	B. M. Krishnapppagowda	Ind	24,657	46.64	3,554
Bangalore	94	Hosakote	68.53	N. Chikke Gowda	INC	40,227	80.22	T. Kembarai	INC(O)	6,937	13.83	33,290
Bangalore	95	Anekal	56.22	M. B. Ramaswamy	INC	19,891	52.85	M. Muniswamaiah	INC(O)	7,986	21.22	11,905
Mandya	96	Nagamangala	61.60	T. N. Madappa Gowda	INC	24,729	57.74	H. T. Krishnappa	INC(O)	15,365	35.88	9,364
Mandya	97	Maddur	72.14	A. D. Bili Gowda	INC	27,550	48.54	M. Manchegowda	Ind	23,458	41.33	4,092
Mandya	98	Kirugavalu	75.34	G. Made Gowda	INC(O)	25,829	51.05	K. N. Nagegowda	INC	23,819	47.08	2,010
Mandya	99	Malavalli	60.19	M. Malikarjnna Swamy	INC	26,231	64.06	D. Rudraiah	INC(O)	14,717	35.94	11,514
Mandya	100	Mandya	64.30	M. H. Borauiah	INC	28,552	49.30	K. V. Shankara Gowda	INC(O)	28,405	49.05	147
Mandya	101	Shrirangapattana	64.43	Damayanthi Gowda	INC	25,965	46.71	A. C. Srikantaiah	INC(O)	18,826	33.86	7,139
Mandya	102	Pandavapura	75.17	D. Halagegowda	INC	36,900	70.89	K. M. Kengegowda	INC(O)	15,156	29.11	21,744
Mandya	103	Krishnarajpete	66.08	S. M. Lingappa	INC	29,424	65.63	M. K. Bommognoa	Ind	15,410	34.37	14,014
Mysore	104	Hanur	74.84	R. Rache Gowda	INC	25,887	54.14	H. N. A. Appa	INC(O)	21,930	45.86	3,957
Mysore	105	Kollegal	54.22	M. Siddamadaiah	INC	21,455	56.63	R. Bharanaiah	INC(O)	13,667	36.07	7,788
Mysore	106	Bannur	68.82	K. Made Gowda	INC(O)	21,880	49.33	T. P. Boraiah	INC	20,809	46.92	1,071
Mysore	107	T. Narasipur	69.96	M. Rajasekara Murthy	INC(O)	24,002	53.44	K. Kempeere Gowda	INC	20,178	44.93	3,824
Mysore	108	Krishnaraja	50.39	D. Suryanarayana	INC	14,150	44.04	H. Gangadharan	BJS	5,994	18.66	8,156
Mysore	109	Narasimharaja	44.47	Azeez Sait	INC	17,784	64.19	A. Ramanna	JPP	5,454	19.68	12,330
Mysore	110	Chamundeshwari	56.95	Kalastavadi Puttaswamy	INC	20,981	55.74	K. Javare Gowda	Ind	10,849	28.82	10,132
Mysore	111	Nanjangud	58.36	K. B. Shivaiah	INC	16,334	48.16	Slrikantaiah	Ind	9,212	27.16	7,122
Mysore	112	Biligere	60.09	N. S. Gurusiddappa	Ind	17,105	47.34	M. Krishnaiah	INC	16,540	45.78	565
Mysore	113	Santhemarahalli	45.14	K. Siddaiah	INC	14,769	57.00	B. Baavanna	INC(O)	8,112	31.31	6,657
Mysore	114	Chamarajanagar	74.38	S. Puttaswamy	INC	24,218	50.43	M. C. Basappa	INC(O)	22,764	47.40	1,454
Mysore	115	Gundlupet	70.73	K. S. Nagarathnamma	INC	30,055	59.74	B. Basappa	INC(O)	20,255	40.26	9,800
Mysore	116	Heggadadevankote	62.34	R. Peeranna	INC(O)	21,859	51.45	H. B. Chaluvaiah	INC	20,628	48.55	1,231
Mysore	117	Hunasuru	66.24	U. Kariyappa Gowda	INC	25,711	51.53	H. Hombe Gowda	INC(O)	11,960	23.97	13,751
Mysore	118	Krishnarajanagara	65.62	H. B. Kenche Gowda	INC	15,604	37.87	H. L. Thimmegowda	INC(O)	10,526	25.55	5,078
Mysore	119	Periyapatna	69.88	H. M. Channabasappa	INC	26,027	55.81	K. P. Kariyappa	INC(O)	20,611	44.19	5,416
Kodagu	120	Virajpet	50.24	G. K. Subhaiah	INC	20,023	63.71	N. Lokayya Naik	BJS	10,866	34.58	9,157
Kodagu	121	Madikeri	55.02	A. M. Bellaippa	INC	24,442	60.28	D. A. Chinnappa	INC(O)	8,109	20.00	16,333
Kodagu	122	Somwarpet	59.65	R. Gundu Rao	INC	23,448	56.24	C. K. Kalappa	INC(O)	13,489	32.35	9,959
Hassan	123	Belur	52.88	S. H. Puttaranganath	INC	18,283	59.52	B. H. Lakshmanaiah	INC(O)	11,068	36.03	7,215
Hassan	124	Arsikere	68.03	H. S. Siddappa	INC(O)	23,026	47.77	Gangadharappa	INC	21,925	45.49	1,101
Hassan	125	Gandasi	58.98	M. Nanje Gowda	INC	14,502	38.78	B. Nanjappa	Ind	8,781	23.48	5,721
Hassan	126	Shravanabelagola	66.75	H. C. Srikantaiah	Ind	30,308	60.70	Sakuntalamma	INC	18,174	36.40	12,134
Hassan	127	Holenarasipur	76.75	H. D. Deve Gowda	INC(O)	26,639	53.80	K. Kumaraswamy	INC	20,475	41.35	6,164
Hassan	128	Arkalgud	65.44	H. N. Nanje Gowda	INC	24,441	57.19	K. B. Mallappa	INC(O)	8,251	19.31	16,190
Hassan	129	Hassan	56.23	K. H. Hanume Gowda	INC(O)	20,464	49.89	G. A. Thimmappagowda	INC	18,083	44.08	2,381
Hassan	130	Sakleshpur	60.68	K. M. Rudrappa	INC	27,233	63.17	M. N. Venkataramana	INC(O)	10,046	23.30	17,187
Dakshina Kannada	131	Sullia	57.71	P. D. Bangera	INC	23,089	63.02	Mundara	BJS	11,802	32.21	11,287
Dakshina Kannada	132	Puttur	68.99	A. Shanker Alva	INC	29,630	56.42	K. Rama Bhat	BJS	15,695	29.89	13,935
Dakshina Kannada	133	Belthangady	68.85	K. Subramanya Gowda	INC	24,126	57.97	K. Chidananda	INC(O)	8,004	19.23	16,122
Dakshina Kannada	134	Bantval	68.43	B. V. Kakkilaya	CPI	30,031	62.51	A. Rukmayya Poojari	BJS	11,762	24.48	18,269
Dakshina Kannada	135	Mangalore I	70.10	Addy Saldanha	INC	21,994	49.74	C. G. Kamath	BJS	8,476	19.17	13,518
Dakshina Kannada	136	Mangalore II	71.37	U. T. Fareed	INC	30,048	53.79	A. Krishna Shetty	CPI(M)	14,383	25.75	15,665
Dakshina Kannada	137	Surathkal	66.57	B. Subbayya Shetty	INC	27,720	64.30	Rathankumar Kattemar	SWA	6,148	14.26	21,572
Dakshina Kannada	138	Kapu	70.32	B. Bhaskar Shetty	INC	25,358	62.26	K. Muddu Suvarna	Ind	13,504	33.16	11,854
Dakshina Kannada	139	Udupi	76.12	Manorama Madhwaraj	INC	26,020	58.49	V. S. Acharya	BJS	11,076	24.90	14,944
Dakshina Kannada	140	Brahmavar	64.62	Jayaprakash S. Kolkebail	INC	22,421	58.28	M. M. Hegde	INC(O)	7,846	20.39	14,575
Dakshina Kannada	141	Kundapura	64.57	Winnifred E. Fernandes	INC	18,776	48.05	Sanjeeva Shetty	INC(O)	16,954	43.38	1,822
Dakshina Kannada	142	Byndoor	52.59	A. G. Kodgi	INC	29,496	71.79	D. Ganapayya	Ind	6,104	14.86	23,392
Dakshina Kannada	143	Karkala	63.26	Veerappa Moily	INC	25,360	67.73	Sunder Hegde	INC(O)	5,224	13.95	20,136
Dakshina Kannada	144	Moodabidri	71.19	Damodar Moolki	INC	25,121	64.94	K. Amarnath Shetty	INC(O)	12,727	32.90	12,394
Chikmagalur	145	Sringeri	70.62	K. N. Veerappa Gowda	INC	25,807	56.98	H. V. Srikanta Bhatta	BJS	10,226	22.58	15,581
Chikmagalur	146	Mudigere	52.37	G. Puttuswamy	INC	24,425	86.92	B. M. Shamanaika	INC(O)	3,676	13.08	20,749
Chikmagalur	147	Chikmagalur	52.16	E. E. Vaz	INC	21,288	65.15	C. R. Shivananda	INC(O)	7,528	23.04	13,760
Chikmagalur	148	Birur	64.07	M. Mallappa	INC	20,333	53.42	N. K. Huchappa	INC(O)	17,729	46.58	2,604
Chikmagalur	149	Kadur	60.86	K. R. Honnappa	INC	15,558	43.34	K. M. Thammaiah	Ind	10,131	28.22	5,427
Chikmagalur	150	Tarikere	65.78	Hanji Shivanna	INC	16,628	35.95	H. R. Basavaraju	INC(O)	10,890	23.55	5,738
Shimoga	151	Channagiri	61.62	N. G. Halappa	INC	27,097	54.46	D. M. Raghavappa	Ind	18,677	37.54	8,420
Shimoga	152	Bhadravati	67.38	Abdul Anwar	INC	23,527	42.79	K. M. Javaraiah	INC(O)	21,987	39.99	1,540
Shimoga	153	Honnali	65.71	H. B. Kadasiddappa	INC	34,803	69.29	D. Parameswarappa	INC(O)	15,423	30.71	19,380
Shimoga	154	Shimoga	61.72	A. B. B. Narayanaiyengar	INC	30,889	58.82	Y. R. Parameshwarappa	SSP	12,630	24.05	18,259
Shimoga	155	Tirthahalli	67.76	Konandur Lingappa	SSP	15,425	36.72	K. T. Danamma	INC	12,859	30.61	2,566
Shimoga	156	Hosanagar	68.62	Sheeranaly Chandrashekar	INC	17,158	41.69	B. Swamy Rao	SSP	15,043	36.55	2,115
Shimoga	157	Sagar	70.15	Kagodu Thimmappa	SSP	16,694	57.74	L. T. Toimmappa Hegde	INC	11,477	39.70	5,217
Shimoga	158	Soraba	77.81	Sarekoppa Bangarappa	SSP	22,537	46.08	R. C. Patil	INC	15,243	31.16	7,294
Shimoga	159	Shikaripura	59.27	K. Yenkatappa	INC	26,156	69.30	E. P. Chandya Naik	INC(O)	8,092	21.44	18,064
Uttara Kannada	160	Sirsi	59.88	M. H. Jayaprakashanarayan	INC	24,373	66.20	Umakant Borkar	BJS	12,444	33.80	11,929
Uttara Kannada	161	Bhatkal	61.94	Yahya Umar	INC	22,751	55.94	Madev Naik	INC(O)	14,074	34.60	8,677
Uttara Kannada	162	Kumta	63.93	Sitaram Naik	INC	21,698	55.98	S. Ramachandra Bhagwat	INC(O)	14,088	36.34	7,610
Uttara Kannada	163	Ankola	57.12	R. K. Mahabaleshwar	INC	14,241	41.80	V. K. Ramakant Narvekar	INC(O)	8,667	25.44	5,574
Uttara Kannada	164	Karwar	60.40	Balsu Kadam	INC	19,195	51.28	Krishnapur Demu	BJS	8,084	21.59	11,111
Uttara Kannada	165	Haliyal	60.22	Virupaksh Ghadi	INC	26,086	61.59	Maruti Patil	INC(O)	9,122	21.54	16,964
Dharwad	166	Dharwad Rural	57.14	M. Sumatibalachandra	INC	22,710	70.37	V. L. Patil	INC(O)	7,392	22.91	15,318
Dharwad	167	Dharwad	65.82	D. K. Naikar	INC	18,653	51.62	P. Y. Shankaragouda	BJS	10,117	28.00	8,536
Dharwad	168	Hubli City	69.16	Imam Sanadi	INC	24,741	57.51	S. S. Shivamurteppa	BJS	16,432	38.20	8,309
Dharwad	169	Hubli Rural	69.14	G. Rangaswamy Sandra	INC	27,745	60.05	Rachappa Wali	INC(O)	10,515	22.76	17,230
Dharwad	170	Kalghatgi	67.58	P. G. Channappagouda	INC	18,708	51.94	Fakiragouda Patil	INC(O)	16,259	45.14	2,449
Dharwad	171	Kundgol	78.85	R. V. Rangangowda	INC	25,694	60.67	B. S. Rayappa	INC(O)	16,659	39.33	9,035
Dharwad	172	Shiggaon	62.08	Mohammed Nadaf	INC	19,799	48.79	P. B. Hanmantgouda	Ind	16,270	40.10	3,529
Dharwad	173	Hangal	73.42	S. P. Chandrashekharappa	INC	31,348	65.59	S. M. Shivalingappa	INC(O)	15,002	31.39	16,346
Dharwad	174	Hirekerur	77.75	B. B. Gadlappa	INC	28,205	53.15	G. S. R. Basalingappagouda	INC(O)	24,529	46.22	3,676
Dharwad	175	Ranibennur	72.85	K. B. Koliwad	INC	28,540	61.00	B. C. Patil	INC(O)	17,043	36.43	11,497
Dharwad	176	Byadgi	73.59	K. F. Patil	INC	19,792	47.66	H. R. Kalineerappa	INC(O)	12,419	29.91	7,373
Dharwad	177	Haveri	66.67	Fakirappa Taware	INC	25,061	57.16	S. M. Danappa	INC(O)	15,650	35.70	9,411
Dharwad	178	Shirahatti	71.38	W. V. Vadirajcharya	INC	21,314	45.28	K. S. Veeraiah	SWA	9,797	20.81	11,517
Dharwad	179	Mundargi	70.77	Kuberappa Kurudigi	INC	28,054	60.46	R. G. Gulappa	INC(O)	16,993	36.62	11,061
Dharwad	180	Gadag	78.80	P. K. Hanamanta Gouda	INC	29,638	54.19	M. V. Rudrappa	INC(O)	22,709	41.52	6,929
Dharwad	181	Ron	62.60	A. V. Patil	INC	20,567	58.59	N. Basayya Pujal	Ind	13,121	37.38	7,446
Dharwad	182	Nargund	59.31	J. Y. Venkappa	INC	20,070	60.05	Bhaskar Pujar	INC(O)	13,350	39.95	6,720
Dharwad	183	Navalgund	77.95	K. M. Karaveerappa	INC(O)	21,716	51.31	R. M. Patil	INC	19,594	46.30	2,122
Belagavi	184	Ramdurg	62.95	R. S. Patil	INC	23,968	57.93	Sharadaua Pattan	INC(O)	14,409	34.83	9,559
Belagavi	185	Parasgad	70.67	Shankarrao Padaki	INC	31,810	64.51	T. R. Patil	INC(O)	17,001	34.48	14,809
Belagavi	186	Bailhongal	74.30	P. B. Arvbali Patil	INC(O)	23,655	52.07	B. R. Chanabasappa	INC	21,775	47.93	1,880
Belagavi	187	Kittur	78.87	D. B. Inamdar	INC(O)	27,299	54.68	S. S. Basappa	INC	22,625	45.32	4,674
Belagavi	188	Khanapur	64.03	S. N. Bhagvantrao	Ind	23,081	55.50	B. B. Veerabhadrappa	INC(O)	10,674	25.67	12,407
Belagavi	189	Belagavi City	76.95	Sw. B. Annappa	Ind	24,814	45.11	P. R. Bhimarao	INC(O)	13,783	25.06	11,031
Belagavi	190	Uchagaon	55.22	Prabhakar Pawashe	Ind	13,916	38.09	K. M. Basavaneppa	Ind	10,727	29.36	3,189
Belagavi	191	Hire Bagewadi	63.78	S. A. Patil	INC	15,621	38.57	M. B. Patil	INC(O)	10,362	25.58	5,259
Belagavi	192	Gokak	65.27	G. C. Tammanna	INC	28,005	66.26	B. M. Patil	INC(O)	11,144	26.37	16,861
Belagavi	193	Arabhavi	51.97	Veeranna Koujalgi	INC	21,362	61.85	Ningayya Pujeri	INC(O)	8,934	25.87	12,428
Belagavi	194	Hukkeri	63.82	Virupaxappa Nooli	INC(O)	19,079	48.22	S. H. Utubuddi Peepzade	INC	17,629	44.55	1,450
Belagavi	195	Sankeshwar	73.32	Lalagouda Patil	INC	23,756	55.23	S. Satagouda Patil	INC(O)	19,253	44.77	4,503
Belagavi	196	Nippani	76.61	K. R. Vithalrao	INC	28,494	58.56	Balavant Chavan	Ind	18,950	38.95	9,544
Belagavi	197	Sadalga	66.42	A. J. Sripal	INC	35,857	82.37	V. B. Bashetteppa	BJS	6,842	15.72	29,015
Belagavi	198	Chikkodi	56.57	Parashuram Hegre	INC	22,005	64.67	Pandit Bagewadi	INC(O)	9,530	28.01	12,475
Belagavi	199	Raibag	71.31	V. L. Patil	INC	36,372	70.08	Sidling Bane	INC(O)	15,526	29.92	20,846
Belagavi	200	Kagwad	47.34	Ragunath Kittur	INC	19,643	66.80	Laxman Karale	INC(O)	8,718	29.65	10,925
Belagavi	201	Athani	60.51	Anandrao Desai	INC	25,532	60.93	S. Virangoud Patil	INC(O)	15,556	37.12	9,976
Bijapur	202	Jamkhandi	66.45	Pavadeppa Bangi	INC	26,029	55.89	A. G. Desai	INC(O)	19,411	41.68	6,618
Bijapur	203	Bilgi	62.41	G. K. Maritammappa	INC	25,216	59.78	S. S. Shivasiddappa	INC(O)	15,867	37.62	9,349
Bijapur	204	Mudhol	69.12	N. K. Pandappa	INC	26,851	55.53	Hiralal Shah	INC(O)	21,040	43.51	5,811
Bijapur	205	Bagalkot	68.69	Basappa Muranal	INC	23,900	47.77	N. P. Mallanagouda	INC(O)	23,688	47.34	212
Bijapur	206	Badami	72.79	Raosaheb Desai	INC	29,832	62.54	P. K. Mahagundappa	INC(O)	17,086	35.82	12,746
Bijapur	207	Guledgud	62.33	G. P. Nanjayyanamath	INC	24,362	68.96	Bajirao Hatagar	INC(O)	6,314	17.87	18,048
Bijapur	208	Hungund	62.90	Sangappa Nagaral	INC	25,128	63.78	N. T. Basaraddeppa	INC(O)	12,966	32.91	12,162
Bijapur	209	Muddebihal	64.21	S. M. Murigeppa	INC	17,778	40.32	G. S. Mallappa	INC(O)	17,021	38.60	757
Bijapur	210	Huvina Hippargi	65.36	K. D. Patil	INC(O)	18,331	57.97	L. R. Naik	INC	12,855	40.66	5,476
Bijapur	211	Basavana Bagevadi	63.78	Somanagouda Patil	INC(O)	23,061	56.94	G. V. Patil	INC	16,250	40.12	6,811
Bijapur	212	Tikota	55.67	G. N. Patil	INC(O)	22,119	60.01	Shivaram Jiddi	INC	14,156	38.41	7,963
Bijapur	213	Bijapur	58.90	K. T. Rathod	INC	23,205	58.54	Vishnu Pantdit	INC(O)	13,970	35.24	9,235
Bijapur	214	Ballolli	47.41	Jatteppa Kabade	INC(O)	15,537	52.16	Baburao Hujure	INC	11,204	37.61	4,333
Bijapur	215	Indi	56.55	S. Mallappa Karbasappa	INC	17,517	49.64	K. R. Ramagondappa	INC(O)	14,490	41.06	3,027
Bijapur	216	Sindagi	52.29	S. Y. Patil	INC(O)	17,516	51.44	M. H. Bekinalkar	INC	16,538	48.56	978
