= 1978 Karnataka Legislative Assembly election =

- 27 February 1978

All 224 seats in the Karnataka Legislative Assembly 113 seats needed for a majority
	First party	Second party
		JP
Leader	Devaraj Urs
Party	INC(I)	JP
Last election	165	Party did not exist
Seats won	149	59
Seat change	▼16	▲59
Popular vote	5,543,756	4,754,114
Percentage	44.25%	37.95%
Swing	▼7.92%	▲37.95%
Chief Minister of Mysore before election
President's rule
Chief Minister of Karnataka
D. Devaraj Urs
INC(I)

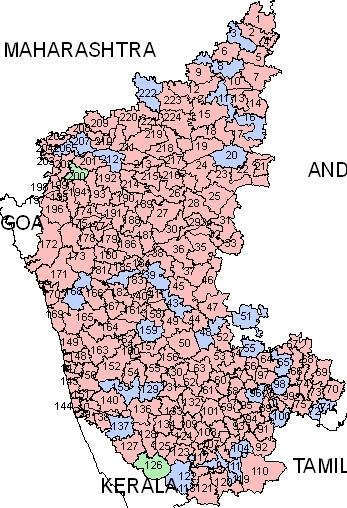
Karnataka Legislative Assembly constituencies (1978–2008)

The 1978 Karnataka State Legislative Assembly election was held on 27 February 1978 in the Indian state of Karnataka to elect 224 members of the Karnataka Legislative Assembly. Riding on the popularity of the various social welfare measures initiated by Chief Minister Devaraj Urs, the Congress-I emerged victorious, winning 149 seats.

== Results ==
Summary of results of the Karnataka Legislative Assembly election, 1978
Political party	Contestants	Seats won	Seat change	Number of votes	Vote share
Indian National Congress (Indira)	214	149	▼16	5,543,756	▼7.92%
Janata Party	222	59	▲59	4,754,114	▲37.95%
Communist Party of India	6	3	Steady	148,567	▲0.20%
Indian National Congress (Organisation)	212	2	▼22	1,001,553	▼18.23%
Republican Party of India	3	1	▲1	22,443	▲0.18%
Independents		10	▼10	940,677	N/A
Total		224			

=== District wise results ===
District	Seats				
District	Seats	INC	JNP	IND	OTH
Bidar	6	4	1	—N/a	1
Gulbarga	13	8	3	1	1
Raichur	11	11	—N/a	—N/a	—N/a
Bellary	9	9	—N/a	—N/a	—N/a
Chitradurga	11	9	1	—N/a	1
Tumkur	13	10	3	—N/a	—N/a
Kolar	12	11	—N/a	—N/a	1
Bangalore	25	10	14	1	—N/a
Mandya	9	—N/a	8	1	—N/a
Mysore	16	11	4	1	—N/a
Kodagu	3	3	—N/a	—N/a	—N/a
Hassan	8	4	4	—N/a	—N/a
Dakshina Kannada	15	11	3	—N/a	1
Chikmagalur	6	5	1	—N/a	—N/a
Shimoga	10	9	1	—N/a	—N/a
Uttara Kannada	6	4	2	—N/a	—N/a
Dharwad	18	12	5	1	—N/a
Belagavi	18	9	2	6	1
Bijapur	15	9	6	—N/a	—N/a
Total	224	149	59	10	6

=== Results by constituency ===
District	Constituency		Turnout	Winner				Runner-up				Margin
District	No.	Name	%	Candidate	Party	Votes	%	Candidate	Party	Votes	%	Margin
Bidar	1	Aurad	73.06	Manik Patil	INC(I)	36,381	55.22	Bapurao Patil	Ind	18,946	28.76	17,435
Bidar	2	Bhalki	70.60	Bheemanna Khandre	INC	22,806	44.57	Bidu Gorehinchollikar	INC(I)	17,999	35.17	4,807
Bidar	3	Hulsoor	50.84	Madanlal Badeappa	INC(I)	14,562	36.08	Tataya Kamble	JP	13,027	32.28	1,535
Bidar	4	Bidar	64.71	Veershetty Kusnoor	INC(I)	29,809	57.25	Kashinath Gurappa	JP	13,515	25.96	16,294
Bidar	5	Humnabad	68.16	Basavaraj Havgiappa Patil	JP	16,167	29.67	V. N. Patil Neelappa	CPI	14,297	26.24	1,870
Bidar	6	Basavakalyan	61.65	Bapurao Hulsoorkar	INC(I)	23,827	45.96	Tajuddin Nawazbhai	JP	18,868	36.39	4,959
Gulbarga	7	Chincholi	67.55	Devendrappa Ghalappa Jamadar	INC(I)	25,963	51.59	Vaijnath Patil	JP	19,508	38.77	6,455
Gulbarga	8	Kamalapur	62.13	Govind P. Vadeyraj	JP	23,110	51.59	Narsing Jadhav	INC(I)	17,301	38.62	5,809
Gulbarga	9	Aland	66.50	Anna Kotalli	JP	26,232	56.53	Digamber Kalmanker	INC(I)	16,956	36.54	9,276
Gulbarga	10	Gulbarga	60.88	Qamar ul Islam	Ind	18,005	32.80	Ustad Hussain	JP	17,242	31.41	763
Gulbarga	11	Shahabad	49.84	Sharnappa Bhairy	CPI	22,685	51.50	S. M. Hagaragi	JP	14,047	31.89	8,638
Gulbarga	12	Afzalpur	66.23	M. Y. Patil	JP	23,823	47.52	Hanumantrao Desai	INC(I)	23,436	46.75	387
Gulbarga	13	Chittapur	52.90	Prabhakar R. Telkar	INC(I)	20,814	56.08	Kusumakar Desai	JP	10,015	26.98	10,799
Gulbarga	14	Sedam	66.83	Sher Khan	INC(I)	22,397	45.31	Baswanth Reddy	JP	18,761	37.96	3,636
Gulbarga	15	Jevargi	63.32	Dharam Singh	INC(I)	26,584	54.13	Mallappa Alur	JP	14,989	30.52	11,595
Gulbarga	16	Gurmitkal	63.28	Mallikarjun Kharge	INC(I)	30,380	64.99	G. Mahadevappa Tamanna	JP	13,781	29.48	16,599
Gulbarga	17	Yadgir	67.67	Sharnapa Kalburgi	INC(I)	28,309	55.53	Vishwanathreddy Rachabngouda	JP	20,759	40.72	7,550
Gulbarga	18	Shahapur	60.04	Shivanna Sawoor	INC(I)	29,132	59.94	Inayatur Siddigi	JP	16,098	33.12	13,034
Gulbarga	19	Shorapur	56.46	Raja Naik	INC(I)	23,201	51.96	Raja Naik	JP	16,461	36.86	6,740
Raichur	20	Devadurga	48.04	B. Shivanna	INC(I)	21,752	62.59	Noorya Naik	JP	9,921	28.55	11,831
Raichur	21	Raichur	51.47	Nazeer Siddiqui	INC(I)	20,619	54.55	V. Rajanna Laxayya	Ind	9,013	23.84	11,606
Raichur	22	Kalmala	53.42	Sudhendra Kasbe	INC(I)	19,301	50.17	Muniyappa Muddappa B.	JP	11,957	31.08	7,344
Raichur	23	Manvi	64.60	R. Ambanna Naik	INC(I)	17,325	39.26	K. Rajasekharappa	JP	15,817	35.84	1,508
Raichur	24	Lingsugur	69.80	Baswaraj Anwari	INC(I)	28,510	54.85	Raja Amareshwara Naik	JP	20,809	40.03	7,701
Raichur	25	Sindhanur	71.50	Narayanappa Hanumanthappa	INC(I)	21,536	37.14	Amare Gouda	INC	18,875	32.55	2,661
Raichur	26	Kushtagi	60.88	M. Ganganna Bheemappa	INC(I)	27,908	57.36	Vittappa Kantli	JP	9,699	19.93	18,209
Raichur	27	Yelburga	65.32	Shrilingraj Rao	INC(I)	32,453	63.56	Shankarappa Siddappa	JP	14,504	28.41	17,949
Raichur	28	Kanakagiri	63.40	M. Nagappa Mukappa	INC(I)	27,932	57.67	Mariyappa Bhatada	JP	12,924	26.68	15,008
Raichur	29	Gangawati	68.03	C. Yadave Rao	INC(I)	31,973	57.27	Srirangadevarayalu Vceeravenkatadevarayalu	JP	18,652	33.41	13,321
Raichur	30	Koppal	66.77	Veeranna Mudgal	INC(I)	30,402	61.70	Shankragouda Singataloor	JP	13,353	27.10	17,049
Bellary	31	Siruguppa	70.85	B. E. Ramaiah	INC(I)	34,465	52.76	Narayana Swamy K.	JP	25,596	39.18	8,869
Bellary	32	Kurugodu	70.40	M. Ramappa	INC(I)	26,833	51.08	Allum Veerabhadrappa	JP	19,168	36.49	7,665
Bellary	33	Bellary	60.87	K. Bhasker Naidu	INC(I)	25,911	48.53	Abdul Huq	JP	21,147	39.61	4,764
Bellary	34	Hospet	66.08	K. Gudusaheb	INC(I)	34,855	53.92	G. Shankar Goud	JP	26,754	41.39	8,101
Bellary	35	Sandur	66.44	C. Rudrappa	INC(I)	31,206	62.22	Y. Thimmappa	JP	15,318	30.54	15,888
Bellary	36	Kudligi	68.12	T. Somappa	INC(I)	31,136	63.84	B. Sathyanarayana Sing	JP	13,942	28.58	17,194
Bellary	37	Kottur	72.33	M. M. J. Sadyoatha	INC(I)	26,076	49.14	B. S. Veerabhadrappa	JP	17,401	32.79	8,675
Bellary	38	Hoovina Hadagali	71.53	Karibasavanagoud Kogali	INC(I)	26,962	47.20	M. P. Prakash	JP	22,952	40.18	4,010
Bellary	39	Harapanahalli	72.01	D. Narayana Das	INC(I)	26,244	51.93	B. Y. Nemya Naik	JP	20,151	39.87	6,093
Chitradurga	40	Harihar	75.33	P. Basavana Gowda	INC(I)	36,644	55.38	H. Shivappa	JP	26,359	39.83	10,285
Chitradurga	41	Davanagere	72.42	Pampapathi	CPI	32,199	51.08	K. Mallappa	JP	24,410	38.72	7,789
Chitradurga	42	Mayakonda	72.55	Nagamma C. Keshavamurty	INC(I)	28,277	47.04	K. G. Maheswarappa	JP	22,556	37.52	5,721
Chitradurga	43	Bharamasagara	68.39	T. Chowdaiah	INC(I)	26,124	53.08	H. Putta Bai	JP	14,659	29.78	11,465
Chitradurga	44	Chitradurga	62.33	V. Masiyappa	INC(I)	32,697	57.49	C. Abdul Rahim	JP	21,621	38.02	11,076
Chitradurga	45	Jagalur	73.00	G. H. Ashwath Reddy	JP	23,555	40.12	B. H. Sreenivasa Naik	INC(I)	23,496	40.02	59
Chitradurga	46	Molakalmuru	76.98	Papanaik Patil	INC(I)	30,316	50.53	H. C. Boraiah	JP	27,075	45.13	3,241
Chitradurga	47	Challakere	76.16	N. Jayanna	INC(I)	38,411	63.17	B. L. Gowda	JP	21,120	34.73	17,291
Chitradurga	48	Hiriyur	75.02	K. H. Ranganath	INC(I)	40,938	68.71	D. Manjunath	JP	16,730	28.08	24,208
Chitradurga	49	Holalkere	77.72	K. H. Siddarampna	INC(I)	20,573	33.54	M. B. Thipperudrappa	INC	19,904	32.45	669
Chitradurga	50	Hosadurga	72.87	K. Venkataramaiah	INC(I)	30,539	51.33	K. R. Shivaprakash	INC	13,285	22.33	17,254
Tumkur	51	Pavagada	71.64	Nagappa	INC(I)	31,511	48.15	D. Anjanappa	JP	20,341	31.08	11,170
Tumkur	52	Sira	78.07	S. A. Lingaiah	INC(I)	32,270	54.90	P. Mudle Gowda	JP	22,775	38.74	9,495
Tumkur	53	Kallambella	74.69	T. B. Jayachandra	INC(I)	27,645	52.93	B. Ganganna	JP	19,833	37.98	7,812
Tumkur	54	Bellavi	74.29	G. S. Shivananjappa	JP	27,736	47.45	R. Narayana	INC(I)	27,134	46.42	602
Tumkur	55	Madhugiri	70.03	Ganga Hanumaiah	INC(I)	32,686	51.94	Gangabovi	JP	25,820	41.03	6,866
Tumkur	56	Koratagere	73.72	Mudduramaiah	INC(I)	29,833	46.82	C. Veeranna	JP	24,835	38.98	4,998
Tumkur	57	Tumkur	74.39	Nazeer Ahmed	INC(I)	34,199	53.81	Mohamed Khan	JP	24,733	38.91	9,466
Tumkur	58	Kunigal	76.57	Andanaiah	INC(I)	32,654	53.32	G. Thammanna	JP	24,463	39.94	8,191
Tumkur	59	Huliyurdurga	79.05	D. T. Mayanna	JP	25,045	47.66	H. Boregowda	INC(I)	15,595	29.67	9,450
Tumkur	60	Gubbi	79.05	Gatti Chandrasekhar	INC(I)	28,186	48.90	S. Revanna	JP	24,117	41.84	4,069
Tumkur	61	Turuvekere	81.26	K. H. Ramakrishnaiah	INC(I)	23,270	39.26	D. M. Nanjappa	JP	20,747	35.01	2,523
Tumkur	62	Tiptur	81.12	V. L. Sivappa	INC(I)	28,339	46.43	M. R. Ramanna	JP	26,511	43.43	1,828
Tumkur	63	Chikkanayakanahalli	83.54	N. Basavaiah	INC(I)	31,627	54.59	T. M. Majabath	JP	22,594	39.00	9,033
Kolar	64	Gauribidanur	82.26	B. N. K. Papaiah	INC(I)	33,756	51.41	R. N. Lakshmipathi	JP	29,932	45.59	3,824
Kolar	65	Chikballapur	70.95	Renuka Rajendran	INC(I)	32,378	55.58	A. Muniyappa	JP	22,008	37.78	10,370
Kolar	66	Sidlaghatta	84.04	S. Munishainappa	INC(I)	34,683	52.77	E. Venkmatarayappa	JP	27,106	41.24	7,577
Kolar	67	Bagepalli	75.09	S. Muni Kaju	INC(I)	27,052	47.46	V. Krishna Rao	INC	10,337	18.14	16,715
Kolar	68	Chintamani	82.61	Chowda Reddy	INC(I)	46,062	68.52	T. K. Gangi Reddy	JP	19,692	29.29	26,370
Kolar	69	Srinivasapur	77.17	K. R. Ramesh Kumar	INC(I)	31,867	58.86	R. G. Narayanareddy	INC	12,067	22.29	19,800
Kolar	70	Mulbagal	76.98	J. M. Reddy	INC(I)	22,300	34.93	Beere Gowda	JP	17,871	27.99	4,429
Kolar	71	Kolar Gold Field	70.75	C. M. Armugam	RPI	21,920	47.51	S. Rajagopal	JP	13,784	29.88	8,136
Kolar	72	Bethamangala	62.58	C. Venkateshappa	INC(I)	27,715	53.28	T. Channaiah	JP	14,098	27.10	13,617
Kolar	73	Kolar	76.21	M. Abdul Latheef	INC(I)	26,576	46.80	P. Venkatagiriappa	JP	26,182	46.11	394
Kolar	74	Vemagal	82.80	S. Govinda Gowda	INC(I)	36,000	55.76	C. Byre Gowda	JP	26,239	40.64	9,761
Kolar	75	Malur	74.94	P. N. Reddy	INC(I)	23,656	45.37	Lakshmidevi Ramanna	JP	14,866	28.51	8,790
Bangalore	76	Malleshwaram	66.39	P. Ramdev	JP	32,936	56.95	M. S. Krishnan	CPI	20,918	36.17	12,018
Bangalore	77	Rajaji Nagar	66.95	Mallur Rao	JP	42,693	52.62	B. C. Somasekhar	INC(I)	25,173	31.02	17,520
Bangalore	78	Gandhi Nagar	66.67	K. Lakshman	INC(I)	18,372	37.24	M. R. Jayaram	JP	15,202	30.82	3,170
Bangalore	79	Chickpet	64.77	A. Lakshmisagar	JP	19,459	43.19	M. V. Thiwary	INC(I)	14,756	32.75	4,703
Bangalore	80	Binnypet	60.26	I. P. D. Salappa	INC(I)	28,037	44.67	K. Prabhakar Reddy	JP	15,474	24.65	12,563
Bangalore	81	Chamrajpet	62.30	S. Pramila	JP	20,806	42.69	Prabhakar T. S.	INC(I)	15,697	32.21	5,109
Bangalore	82	Basavanagudi	65.91	T. R. Shamanna	JP	47,362	74.75	Narasinga Rao D. S.	INC(I)	14,418	22.76	32,944
Bangalore	83	Jayanagar	62.41	M. Chandrasekhar	JP	35,209	56.59	Sathyanarayana M. G.	INC(I)	17,941	28.84	17,268
Bangalore	84	Shanti Nagar	61.63	P. K. Ranganathan	INC(I)	17,851	40.78	Govindaraja P. D.	JP	14,511	33.15	3,340
Bangalore	85	Shivajinagar	57.89	C. M. Ibrahim	JP	17,725	49.33	Srinivasulu Naidu K. R.	INC(I)	13,717	38.18	4,008
Bangalore	86	Bharathinagar	65.01	Michael Fernandes	JP	14,106	29.39	Muniswamy M.	INC(I)	13,498	28.12	608
Bangalore	87	Jayamahal	62.00	Jeevaraj Alva	JP	18,316	39.68	S. Hameed Shah	INC(I)	15,991	34.64	2,325
Bangalore	88	Yelahanka	69.27	B. Basavalingappa	INC(I)	33,662	53.57	D. Munichinnappa	JP	28,587	45.49	5,075
Bangalore	89	Uttarahalli	69.53	M. V. Rajasekharan	JP	34,081	48.57	S. C. Venkatesh	INC(I)	30,944	44.10	3,137
Bangalore	90	Varthur	71.11	B. V. Ramachandra Reddy	JP	28,613	41.09	H. T. Somashekara Reddy	INC(I)	19,301	27.72	9,312
Bangalore	91	Kanakapura	82.30	C. Appaji	INC(I)	30,883	50.74	Srinivasa Murthy K. G.	JP	27,590	45.33	3,293
Bangalore	92	Sathanur	81.60	K. L. Shivalinge Gowda	JP	29,243	46.90	Kariappa S.	INC(I)	28,840	46.25	403
Bangalore	93	Channapatna	80.30	D. T. Ramu	INC(I)	32,601	46.30	B. J. Linge Gowda	Ind	19,190	27.26	13,411
Bangalore	94	Ramanagara	81.04	A. K. Abdul Samad	INC(I)	27,837	42.79	C. Boraiah	JP	20,875	32.09	6,962
Bangalore	95	Magadi	78.06	Berraswamy Gowda	JP	31,628	49.08	Hulikatte G. Channappa	INC(I)	26,255	40.74	5,373
Bangalore	96	Nelamangala	67.75	K. Prabhakar	INC(I)	20,666	44.12	Doddathimmaiah	JP	19,388	41.39	1,278
Bangalore	97	Doddaballapur	81.90	G. Rame Gowda	INC(I)	39,476	56.89	A. Neelakantaiah	JP	28,338	40.84	11,138
Bangalore	98	Devanahalli	78.20	B. N. Bache Gowda	JP	32,919	47.95	Munu Gowda	INC(I)	27,246	39.69	5,673
Bangalore	99	Hosakote	82.80	B. N. Bache Gowda	JP	35,387	47.46	Mune Gowda	INC	20,795	27.89	14,592
Bangalore	100	Anekal	72.26	Y. Ramakrishna	JP	36,041	55.88	M. Annappa	INC(I)	24,289	37.66	11,752
Mandya	101	Nagamangala	79.74	H. T. Krishnappa	Ind	23,721	39.71	K. Singarigowda	JP	18,475	30.93	5,246
Mandya	102	Maddur	82.64	M. Manchegowda	JP	37,261	57.16	A. D. Bili Gowda	INC(I)	14,700	22.55	22,561
Mandya	103	Kirugavalu	87.87	G. Made Gowda	JP	40,711	64.00	Rame Gowda	INC(I)	19,480	30.62	21,231
Mandya	104	Malavalli	75.04	K. L. Mariswami	JP	27,774	45.92	M. Shivaiah	INC(I)	27,712	45.82	62
Mandya	105	Mandya	75.71	M. S. Athmananda	JP	31,041	48.69	Sadath Khan	INC(I)	28,294	44.38	2,747
Mandya	106	Keragodu	83.21	H. D. Choudaiah	JP	34,515	61.62	M. D. Siddaramaiah	INC(I)	14,556	25.99	19,959
Mandya	107	Shrirangapattana	79.72	M. Srinivas	JP	20,127	33.67	C. L. Govindaraju	INC(I)	18,647	31.19	1,480
Mandya	108	Pandavapura	75.92	K. Rajagopal	JP	27,341	45.16	C. B. Marigowda	INC(I)	17,885	29.54	9,456
Mandya	109	Krishnarajpete	78.94	S. M. Lingappa	JP	26,352	43.36	K. Ujjinilingeswar	INC(I)	20,040	32.97	6,312
Mysore	110	Hanur	83.80	G. Raju Gouda	INC(I)	37,530	54.09	H. Nagappa	JP	29,447	42.44	8,083
Mysore	111	Kollegal	75.00	M. Siddamadaiah	INC(I)	28,188	48.36	B. Basavaiah	JP	26,646	45.71	1,542
Mysore	112	Bannur	83.32	K. Made Gowda	INC(I)	26,422	42.20	K. J. Ramaswamy	JP	22,307	35.63	4,115
Mysore	113	T. Narasipur	71.08	Venkataramana P.	INC(I)	28,061	51.79	Sreenivasa Prasad V.	JP	20,334	37.53	7,727
Mysore	114	Krishnaraja	63.37	H. Gangadharan	JP	25,091	60.29	K. S. Suryanarayana Rao	INC(I)	15,150	36.41	9,941
Mysore	115	Chamaraja	64.28	Kalastavadi Puttaswamy	JP	24,524	54.54	B. N. Kengegowda	INC(I)	18,103	40.26	6,421
Mysore	116	Narasimharaja	65.09	Azeez Sait	INC(I)	28,718	58.81	B. Ilyas Ahmad	JP	16,070	32.91	12,648
Mysore	117	Chamundeshwari	73.16	D. Jayadevaraja Urs	INC(I)	20,529	36.36	M. Rajasekara Murthy	JP	19,450	34.44	1,079
Mysore	118	Nanjangud	74.13	K. B. Shivaiah	INC(I)	19,639	37.75	Puttaveer Tharak	JP	12,854	24.70	6,785
Mysore	119	Santhemarahalli	67.78	M. Madaiah	INC(I)	23,026	44.79	S. M. Siddayya	JP	21,398	41.62	1,628
Mysore	120	Chamarajanagar	80.71	M. C. Basappa	JP	36,389	48.84	S. Puttaswamy	INC	20,511	27.53	15,878
Mysore	121	Gundlupet	83.02	H. K. Shivarudrappa	Ind	27,141	39.55	K. S. Nagarathnamma	Ind	26,870	39.15	271
Mysore	122	Heggadadevankote	70.41	Susheela Cheluvaraj	INC(I)	27,821	48.25	H. B. Chaluvaiah	JP	16,661	28.90	11,160
Mysore	123	Hunasuru	82.45	D. Devaraj Urs	INC(I)	36,766	55.24	H. L. Thimmegowda	JP	24,711	37.13	12,055
Mysore	124	Krishnarajanagara	79.55	Adagur H. Vishwanath	INC(I)	33,571	54.89	S. Nanjappa	JP	24,441	39.97	9,130
Mysore	125	Periyapatna	81.83	K. S. Kalamarigowda	JP	28,152	42.30	K. P. Kariyappa	INC(I)	20,847	31.32	7,305
Kodagu	126	Virajpet	70.06	G. K. Subhaiah	INC(I)	25,309	48.48	Paniyeravara P. Choma	JP	23,040	44.13	2,269
Kodagu	127	Madikeri	76.04	M. C. Nanaiah	INC(I)	25,327	44.23	A. K. Subbaiah	JP	22,453	39.21	2,874
Kodagu	128	Somwarpet	79.96	R. Gundu Rao	INC(I)	31,588	51.27	B. A. Jivijaya	JP	27,982	45.42	3,606
Hassan	129	Belur	74.19	B. H. Lakshmanaiah	JP	26,045	50.11	Udayakumar	INC(I)	23,286	44.80	2,759
Hassan	130	Arsikere	74.97	D. B. Gangadharappa	INC(I)	36,062	56.54	K. N. Durgappa Setty	JP	19,585	30.70	16,477
Hassan	131	Gandasi	72.64	Haranahalli Ramaswamy	INC(I)	23,352	42.92	B. Nanjappa	JP	21,484	39.49	1,868
Hassan	132	Shravanabelagola	78.79	H. C. Srikantaiah	INC(I)	43,045	60.75	N. Gangadhar	JP	25,440	35.90	17,605
Hassan	133	Holenarasipur	84.90	H. D. Deve Gowda	JP	33,992	52.44	K. Kumaraswamy	INC(I)	28,472	43.92	5,520
Hassan	134	Arkalgud	78.49	K. B. Mallappa	JP	32,315	55.02	Puttalingegowda	INC(I)	13,824	23.54	18,491
Hassan	135	Hassan	70.18	K. H. Hanume Gowda	INC(I)	34,344	54.75	Munivenkate Gowda A. C.	JP	24,731	39.43	9,613
Hassan	136	Sakleshpur	78.22	J. D. Somappa	INC(I)	32,658	48.12	B. B. Shivappa	JP	22,361	32.95	10,297
Dakshina Kannada	137	Sullia	74.95	A. Ramachandra	JP	24,148	44.54	P. D. Bangera	INC(I)	20,874	38.50	3,274
Dakshina Kannada	138	Puttur	78.82	K. Rama Bhat	JP	25,751	43.32	Betta Bhat	INC(I)	25,109	42.24	642
Dakshina Kannada	139	Vittal	78.91	B. V. Kakkilaya	CPI	31,030	51.89	B. A. Ummarabba	JP	20,838	34.85	10,192
Dakshina Kannada	140	Belthangady	76.39	K. Gangadhara Gowda	INC(I)	31,255	55.53	K. Chidananda	JP	21,388	38.00	9,867
Dakshina Kannada	141	Bantval	78.18	B. A. Mohideen	INC(I)	30,790	60.12	A. Rukmayya Poojari	JP	18,409	35.95	12,381
Dakshina Kannada	142	Mangalore	75.71	P. F. Rodrigues	INC(I)	26,579	50.13	Sharda Achar	JP	25,344	47.80	1,235
Dakshina Kannada	143	Ullal	73.21	U. T. Fareed	INC(I)	30,174	57.07	P. Ramachandra Rao	CPI(M)	12,445	23.54	17,729
Dakshina Kannada	144	Surathkal	74.54	B. Subbayya Shetty	INC(I)	29,452	58.63	J. R. Pais	JP	15,203	30.26	14,249
Dakshina Kannada	145	Kapu	75.14	B. Bhaskar Shetty	INC(I)	29,030	57.67	Dayanatha K. Kotian	JP	20,312	40.35	8,718
Dakshina Kannada	146	Udupi	77.79	Manorama Madhwaraj	INC(I)	30,899	55.58	Shridhara M. Kalmady	JP	22,819	41.05	8,080
Dakshina Kannada	147	Brahmavar	75.19	Ananda Hegde	INC(I)	29,021	49.28	V. S. Acharya	JP	26,158	44.42	2,863
Dakshina Kannada	148	Kundapura	72.04	Sanjiva Shetty	JP	28,612	49.09	Mani Gopal	INC(I)	26,748	45.89	1,864
Dakshina Kannada	149	Byndoor	66.87	Gopalrishna Kodgi	INC(I)	29,622	59.24	Elwin P. Crasto	JP	17,655	35.31	11,967
Dakshina Kannada	150	Karkala	77.51	Veerappa Moily	INC(I)	29,941	55.56	M. K. Vijaya Kumar	JP	20,985	38.94	8,956
Dakshina Kannada	151	Moodabidri	76.88	Damodar Mulky	INC(I)	25,800	52.55	K. Amarnath Shetty	JP	21,121	43.02	4,679
Chikmagalur	152	Sringeri	78.22	B. Ramaiah	INC(I)	34,716	59.84	H. V. Srikanta Bhatta	JP	20,458	35.26	14,258
Chikmagalur	153	Mudigere	73.02	C. Motamma	INC(I)	34,449	66.57	N. U. Sagunaiah	JP	16,217	31.34	18,232
Chikmagalur	154	Chikmagalur	70.72	C. A. Chandre Gowda	INC(I)	26,113	54.11	B. L. Subbamma	JP	18,102	37.51	8,011
Chikmagalur	155	Birur	75.60	M. Mallappa	INC(I)	24,078	46.60	N. K. Huchappa	JP	23,591	45.65	487
Chikmagalur	156	Kadur	76.42	K. M. Thammaiah	JP	19,223	36.00	K. T. Muddiyappa	INC(I)	13,732	25.72	5,491
Chikmagalur	157	Tarikere	78.47	H. M. Mallikarjunappa	INC(I)	30,016	48.39	H. R. Basavaraju	JP	22,478	36.24	7,538
Shimoga	158	Channagiri	79.50	J. H. Patel	JP	30,227	48.96	Abdul Khan	INC(I)	19,826	32.11	10,401
Shimoga	159	Holehonnur	71.28	G. Basavannappa	INC(I)	28,160	50.43	K. G. Chenna Naik	JP	22,487	40.27	5,673
Shimoga	160	Bhadravati	73.50	G. Rajashekar	INC(I)	32,573	49.64	K. M. Javaraiah	JP	29,099	44.34	3,474
Shimoga	161	Honnali	81.60	H. B. Kadasiddappa	INC(I)	33,845	49.93	D. G. Basavana Gowda	JP	31,740	46.83	2,105
Shimoga	162	Shimoga	73.90	K. H. Srinivasa	INC(I)	33,047	52.49	D. H. Shankara Murthy	JP	21,373	33.95	11,674
Shimoga	163	Tirthahalli	78.16	Kadilal Divakar	INC(I)	32,798	56.08	Konandur Lingappa	JP	14,938	25.54	17,860
Shimoga	164	Hosanagar	78.01	S. M. S. Chandrashrkhar	INC(I)	28,092	50.23	B. Swamy Rao	JP	24,174	43.22	3,918
Shimoga	165	Sagar	80.33	L. T. Toimmappa Hegde	INC(I)	30,903	52.27	Kagodu Thimmappa	JP	28,220	47.73	2,683
Shimoga	166	Soraba	79.42	Sarekoppa Bangarappa	INC(I)	32,426	60.40	S. Nagappa	JP	10,131	18.87	22,295
Shimoga	167	Shikaripura	73.51	K. Yenkatappa	INC(I)	28,760	52.42	H. Basavannappa	JP	17,574	32.03	11,186
Uttara Kannada	168	Sirsi	79.66	Umakant Borkar	JP	31,506	50.70	Shankar Revankar	INC(I)	28,793	46.33	2,713
Uttara Kannada	169	Bhatkal	74.46	Mohamed Siddiq	INC(I)	30,800	54.39	U. Chittaranjan	JP	22,867	40.38	7,933
Uttara Kannada	170	Kumta	69.93	Seetaram Nayak	INC(I)	27,894	47.73	Ranayya Naik	JP	25,001	42.78	2,893
Uttara Kannada	171	Ankola	71.79	Anasuya Sharma	JP	27,897	55.60	Ramachandra Naik	INC(I)	18,100	36.08	9,797
Uttara Kannada	172	Karwar	66.03	Dattatraya Waingankar	INC(I)	22,044	44.27	Sakharam Gaonkar	JP	19,602	39.37	2,442
Uttara Kannada	173	Haliyal	73.74	Virupaksh Ghadi	INC(I)	34,566	50.25	Maruti Patil	JP	23,948	34.81	10,618
Dharwad	174	Dharwad Rural	68.86	Sumati Madiman	INC(I)	30,354	63.72	Abdul Dasankop	JP	15,378	32.28	14,976
Dharwad	175	Dharwad	72.11	Bhavurao Deshpande	JP	27,530	51.89	D. K. Naikar	INC(I)	23,182	43.70	4,348
Dharwad	176	Hubli City	74.24	Mahadevsa Jaratarghar	JP	27,694	47.88	Abdularahiman Mudhol	CPI	27,438	47.43	256
Dharwad	177	Hubli Rural	73.24	S. R. Bommai	JP	31,771	53.35	F. M. Kittur	INC(I)	23,137	38.85	8,634
Dharwad	178	Kalghatgi	72.02	Shivanagouda Patil	JP	23,789	48.74	Chana Kurawatti	INC(I)	17,736	36.34	6,053
Dharwad	179	Kundgol	77.44	Mahadevappa Katagi	INC(I)	34,761	60.74	Munir Haidarsab	JP	16,884	29.50	17,877
Dharwad	180	Shiggaon	75.94	Mohammed Nadaf	INC(I)	33,669	56.36	Shankaragouda Patil	JP	22,496	37.66	11,173
Dharwad	181	Hangal	74.59	Manohar Tahasildar	INC(I)	35,228	63.66	Mahamadhusen Malagi	JP	9,866	17.83	25,362
Dharwad	182	Hirekerur	76.92	Shankarrao Gubbi	Ind	32,103	52.83	Basavannappa Gadlappa	INC(I)	23,695	38.99	8,408
Dharwad	183	Ranibennur	75.30	Somalingappa Nalawagal	INC(I)	25,675	43.51	Basanagouda Patil	JP	24,892	42.18	783
Dharwad	184	Byadgi	68.58	Mariyappa Malagi	INC(I)	27,640	58.30	Kariyappa Annigeri	JP	16,289	34.35	11,351
Dharwad	185	Haveri	70.30	Fakirappa Taware	INC(I)	34,067	58.99	Shivaputra Wadeyar	JP	17,105	29.62	16,962
Dharwad	186	Shirahatti	75.51	Gulappa Upanal	INC(I)	28,606	55.03	Irappa Noorashettar	JP	14,466	27.83	14,140
Dharwad	187	Mundargi	70.14	Vasantappa Bhavi	INC(I)	19,069	39.19	Bishtappa Dandin	JP	18,363	37.74	706
Dharwad	188	Gadag	78.80	Chanaveerayya Muttinapendimath	JP	28,094	44.41	Kristagouda Patil	INC	25,649	40.54	2,445
Dharwad	189	Ron	67.38	Veerabhadrappa Muthikatti	INC(I)	26,546	51.33	Neelagangayya Pujar	JP	20,709	40.04	5,837
Dharwad	190	Nargund	74.68	B. R. Patil	INC(I)	16,496	36.93	Parwatagouda Patil	JP	15,450	34.59	1,046
Dharwad	191	Navalgund	75.57	Shankaragouda Patil	INC(I)	22,825	43.86	Mallappa Kulkarni	JP	20,205	38.82	2,620
Belagavi	192	Ramdurg	74.97	Ramanagouda Patil	INC(I)	33,010	56.06	Basavantappa Hireraddi	JP	20,355	34.57	12,655
Belagavi	193	Parasgad	72.34	Gudanshah Takked	INC(I)	23,475	40.10	Shivanand Koujalgi	JP	21,698	37.06	1,777
Belagavi	194	Bailhongal	77.11	Ramalingappa Balekundargi	INC	22,110	40.51	Basavantray Doddagoudar	INC(I)	20,764	38.05	1,346
Belagavi	195	Kittur	73.79	Parvatgouda Patil	JP	28,575	51.00	Shivaputrappa Tonni	INC(I)	27,449	49.00	1,126
Belagavi	196	Khanapur	72.01	Nilkanthrao Sirdesai	Ind	16,610	29.87	Krishnaji Babshet	JP	13,595	24.45	3,015
Belagavi	197	Belagavi City	81.31	Balwant Sayanak	Ind	39,736	56.97	M. N. Naghnoor	Ind	27,720	39.74	12,016
Belagavi	198	Uchagaon	75.10	Prabhakar Pawashe	Ind	24,377	40.13	Parashuram Nandihalli	Ind	17,207	28.32	7,170
Belagavi	199	Hire Bagewadi	71.50	Govind Astekar	Ind	18,507	35.27	Gangadhar Malagali	INC(I)	14,915	28.43	3,592
Belagavi	200	Gokak	66.51	Laxman Nail	INC(I)	31,447	61.60	Chandappa Kattimani	JP	13,980	27.38	17,467
Belagavi	201	Arabhavi	70.34	Veeranna Koujalgi	INC(I)	31,462	55.41	Vasantrao Patil	INC	13,964	24.59	17,498
Belagavi	202	Hukkeri	71.94	Shivayogi Janashetti	INC(I)	25,471	52.82	Virupaxappa Nooli	JP	19,547	40.54	5,924
Belagavi	203	Sankeshwar	75.83	Malhargouda Patil	INC(I)	31,839	56.28	Lakhamappa Khot	JP	22,452	39.69	9,387
Belagavi	204	Nippani	73.35	Balavant Chavan	Ind	35,548	64.27	Gopinath Dhariya	Ind	11,904	21.52	23,644
Belagavi	205	Sadalga	79.17	Anna Bedage	INC(I)	33,598	57.49	Raosaheb Patil	JP	17,099	29.26	16,499
Belagavi	206	Chikkodi	57.40	Parashuram Hegre	INC(I)	22,345	55.17	Shripathi Kamble	JP	13,104	32.36	9,241
Belagavi	207	Raibag	65.18	Rama Nadoni	JP	18,562	37.50	Laxman Holer	INC	15,830	31.98	2,732
Belagavi	208	Kagwad	76.07	Annarao Jakanur	INC(I)	27,892	51.08	Parappa Padanad	JP	21,593	39.54	6,299
Belagavi	209	Athani	63.53	Dhairyashil Pawar	INC(I)	27,214	50.57	Leeladevi R. Prasad	JP	22,394	41.62	4,820
Bijapur	210	Jamkhandi	73.95	Venkappa Pattar	INC(I)	32,461	48.46	Gurupadappa Bagalkot	JP	28,460	42.48	4,001
Bijapur	211	Bilgi	67.48	Siddanagoud Patil	INC(I)	28,005	50.42	Venkanaik Patil	JP	23,485	42.28	4,520
Bijapur	212	Mudhol	70.29	Jayawant Hadimani	INC(I)	25,334	49.91	Ashok Kattimani	JP	20,944	41.26	4,390
Bijapur	213	Bagalkot	69.66	Parappa Kalligudd	INC(I)	22,851	44.01	Ganapatarao Kamble	JP	18,126	34.91	4,725
Bijapur	214	Badami	73.59	B. B. Chimmanakatti	INC(I)	24,249	44.70	Kallappa Pattanashetti	JP	19,772	36.45	4,477
Bijapur	215	Guledgud	66.54	Basanagouda Janali	INC(I)	27,245	53.09	Bajeevarao Hatagar	JP	20,050	39.07	7,195
Bijapur	216	Hungund	68.57	Shankarappa Sugurappa	Ind	19,276	39.77	Shivayya Patil	INC(I)	19,174	39.56	102
Bijapur	217	Muddebihal	74.14	Jagadevarao Deshmukh	JP	28,857	59.85	Mallappa Murigeppasajjan	INC(I)	11,486	23.82	17,371
Bijapur	218	Huvina Hippargi	69.69	Basangouda Patil	JP	26,814	52.77	Kumaragouda Patil	INC(I)	22,531	44.34	4,283
Bijapur	219	Basavana Bagevadi	63.15	Somanagouda Patil	JP	27,806	55.31	Ramesh Sulibhavi	INC(I)	16,048	31.92	11,758
Bijapur	220	Tikota	60.43	Badugouda Patil	JP	21,317	52.07	Basagond Kotihal	INC(I)	16,899	41.28	4,418
Bijapur	221	Bijapur	63.61	Habibuddin Bakshi	JP	26,191	49.39	Khubasing Tathod	INC(I)	16,663	31.43	9,528
Bijapur	222	Ballolli	52.38	Siddharth Arakeri	JP	23,023	57.71	Chandrashekhar Hosamani	INC(I)	14,204	35.60	8,819
Bijapur	223	Indi	60.13	Revanasiddappa Kallur	JP	26,022	55.34	Siddaba Misale	INC(I)	15,856	33.72	10,166
Bijapur	224	Sindagi	55.52	Maibubsaheb Bekinalkar	INC(I)	19,592	43.08	Shankargouda Patil	JP	18,268	40.17	1,324
