= 1967 Mysore State Legislative Assembly election =

Local election in Mysore, India to elect politicians

1967 Mysore Legislative Assembly election
- 1967

All 216 seats in the Mysore Legislative Assembly 109 seats needed for a majority
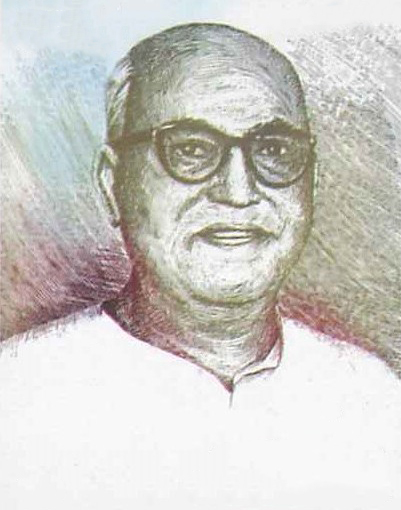
	First party	Second party
		PSP
Party	INC	PSP
Last election	138	20
Seats won	126	20
Seat change	▼12	Steady
Popular vote	3,636,374	666,662
Percentage	48.43%	8.88%
Swing	▼5.20%	▼1.79%
Chief Minister of Mysore before election
S. Nijalingappa
INC
Chief Minister of Mysore
S. Nijalingappa
INC

The 1967 Mysore State Legislative Assembly election was held in the Indian state of Mysore (currently Karnataka) to elect 216 members to the Mysore Legislative Assembly.

== Results ==
Summary of results of the Mysore Legislative Assembly election, 1967
Political party	Contestants	Seats won	Seat change	Number of votes	Vote share	Net change
Indian National Congress	216	126	▼12	3,636,374	48.43%	▼1.79
Praja Socialist Party	52	20	0	666,662	8.88%	▼5.20
Swatantra Party	45	16	▲7	497,055	6.62%	▼0.53
Samyukta Socialist Party	17	6		185,222	2.47%	
Bharatiya Jana Sangh	37	4		211,966	2.82%	
Communist Party of India	10	1		82,531	1.10%	N/A
Republican Party of India	12	1		57,739	0.77%	N/A
Communist Party of India	6	1		38,737	0.52%	N/A
Independents		41	▲14	2,129,786	28.36%	N/A
Total		216				

=== District wise results ===
District	Seats							
District	Seats	INC	PSP	SWP	SSP	BJS	IND	OTH
Bidar	6	3	—N/a	—N/a	—N/a	1	1	1
Gulbarga	13	8	1	3	—N/a	—N/a	1	—N/a
Raichur	10	7	—N/a	1	1	—N/a	1	—N/a
Bellary	8	7	—N/a	1	—N/a	—N/a	—N/a	—N/a
Chitradurga	10	7	—N/a	1	—N/a	—N/a	2	—N/a
Tumkur	13	9	3	—N/a	—N/a	—N/a	1	—N/a
Kolar	12	8	—N/a	—N/a	—N/a	—N/a	4	—N/a
Bangalore	23	13	1	—N/a	—N/a	—N/a	8	1
Mandya	8	5	—N/a	—N/a	—N/a	—N/a	3	—N/a
Mysore	16	9	—N/a	—N/a	1	—N/a	6	—N/a
Coorg	3	1	—N/a	1	—N/a	1	—N/a	—N/a
Hassan	8	2	1	4	—N/a	—N/a	1	—N/a
South Kanara	14	6	4	2	—N/a	1	1	—N/a
Chikmagalur	6	1	4	—N/a	—N/a	—N/a	1	—N/a
Shimoga	9	4	1	—N/a	4	—N/a	—N/a	—N/a
Uttara Kannada	6	1	3	—N/a	—N/a	—N/a	2	—N/a
Dharwad	18	10	2	1	—N/a	1	4	—N/a
Belagavi	18	14	—N/a	—N/a	—N/a	—N/a	4	—N/a
Bijapur	15	11	—N/a	2	—N/a	—N/a	1	1
Total	216	126	20	16	6	4	41	3

=== Results by constituency ===
District	Constituency		Turnout	Winner				Runner-up				Margin
District	No.	Name	%	Candidate	Party	Votes	%	Candidate	Party	Votes	%	Margin
Bidar	1	Aurad	70.37	M. R. S. Rao	INC	25,965	57.36	P. G. R. Patil	Ind	19,299	42.64	6,666
Bidar	2	Bhalki	63.21	B. Shivalingappa	INC	23,210	65.73	B. R. L. Rao	Ind	12,099	34.27	11,111
Bidar	3	Hulsoor	45.42	P. R. Dhondibha	INC	13,220	53.44	B. D. Tipkurle	RPI	10,785	43.60	2,435
Bidar	4	Bidar	64.99	C. Gurupadappa	BJS	21,514	57.53	M. A. Khan	INC	15,880	42.47	5,634
Bidar	5	Humnabad	60.07	V. N. Patil	CPI	16,019	45.93	G. M. Kheny	INC	14,488	41.54	1,531
Bidar	6	Basavakalyan	65.32	S. Sanganbasappa	Ind	16,115	44.61	B. Anandrao	Ind	10,233	28.33	5,882
Gulbarga	7	Chincholi	59.63	V. P. Basappa	INC	31,030	87.98	R. R. J. Rao	SWA	3,617	10.26	27,413
Gulbarga	8	Kamalapur	55.33	L. Chandrashekhar	INC	12,682	46.35	S. Shankershetty	Ind	8,801	32.17	3,881
Gulbarga	9	Aland	61.29	D. R. B. Rao	PSP	15,916	50.60	A. R. B. Rao	INC	15,536	49.40	380
Gulbarga	10	Gulbarga	51.87	Mohammed Mehtab Ali	INC	17,694	53.96	Gangadhar Namoshi	CPI(M)	13,075	39.87	4,619
Gulbarga	11	Afzalpur	49.82	N. S. Patil	INC	19,761	72.17	G. A. R. Basappa	Ind	7,620	27.83	12,141
Gulbarga	12	Kalgi	37.28	K. R. Mallappa	INC	16,533	76.46	A. Rao	SWA	4,223	19.53	12,310
Gulbarga	13	Chittapur	51.41	R. Nagappa	INC	17,088	59.76	P. Ramreddy	SWA	8,867	31.01	8,221
Gulbarga	14	Sedam	54.44	Papiah Jamadanda	SWA	13,173	50.35	G. Tippanna	INC	11,943	45.65	1,230
Gulbarga	15	Jevargi	52.83	S. Siddramgouda	SWA	16,340	54.73	N. Sharnappa	INC	10,881	36.45	5,459
Gulbarga	16	Gurmitkal	41.42	N. Yenkappa	INC	14,127	51.70	S. Bhimappa	SWA	13,200	48.30	927
Gulbarga	17	Yadgir	67.78	V. R. Rachangouda	Ind	23,318	55.04	K. R. Nadgouda	INC	19,050	44.96	4,268
Gulbarga	18	Shahapur	58.79	R. V. N. R. K. Naik	SWA	17,864	50.71	B. Rayappagouda	INC	17,364	49.29	500
Gulbarga	19	Shorapur	42.97	Raja Pidnaik	INC	20,117	81.70	A. Wahed	Ind	4,505	18.30	15,612
Raichur	20	Devadurga	52.68	S. P. B. Patil	SWA	19,074	63.73	Sharnappa	INC	10,857	36.27	8,217
Raichur	21	Raichur	37.84	M. N. Basappa	SSP	14,637	63.24	M. G. Mohiuddin	INC	5,463	23.60	9,174
Raichur	22	Kalmala	20.02	N. Seshappa	INC	6,001	61.28	B. Kristappa	Ind	2,690	27.47	3,311
Raichur	23	Manvi	45.49	B. Sharanabasawaraj	INC	15,032	60.63	C. B. Bettadur	Ind	9,760	39.37	5,272
Raichur	24	Lingsugur	52.01	K. S. Paranagouda	INC	20,024	67.66	R. K. N. V. Naik	SWA	9,573	32.34	10,451
Raichur	25	Sindhanur	70.21	A. Channanagowda	Ind	23,389	64.39	B. R. Basangouda	INC	12,936	35.61	10,453
Raichur	26	Kushtagi	56.74	P. Eshwarappa	INC	17,485	51.98	V. Rajappayya	Ind	16,150	48.02	1,335
Raichur	27	Yelburga	62.29	C. Gouda	INC	24,256	61.92	Veerabahadrappa	Ind	14,126	36.06	10,130
Raichur	28	Gangawati	55.22	T. D. Raya	INC	22,014	60.75	H. R. Rao	Ind	14,221	39.25	7,793
Raichur	29	Koppal	60.14	Virupaxgouda	INC	18,770	51.05	Shankragoudaru	Ind	17,998	48.95	772
Bellary	30	Siruguppa	73.69	M. D. Gowd	INC	22,563	54.96	B. E. Ramaiah	SWA	18,489	45.04	4,074
Bellary	31	Kurugodu	72.91	A. Karibasappa	INC	24,892	63.27	C. M. Revanasiddaiah	SWA	14,453	36.73	10,439
Bellary	32	Bellary	65.99	V. Nagappa	SWA	27,052	62.59	T. G. Sathyanarayan	INC	11,963	27.68	15,089
Bellary	33	Hospet	54.08	R. N. Gouda	INC	19,718	58.06	P. Naglingaiah	Ind	12,736	37.50	6,982
Bellary	34	Sandur	—	M. Y. Ghorpade	INC	Unopposed		—				
Bellary	35	Kudligi	70.77	M. M. J. Sadyojatha	INC	24,488	57.83	T. S. Goud	Ind	16,840	39.77	7,648
Bellary	36	Hadagali	72.73	N. M. K. Sogi	INC	27,462	60.99	C. Andanappa	PSP	17,563	39.01	9,899
Bellary	37	Harapanahalli	56.66	Y. Nayak	INC	22,201	60.14	V. Shivanna	Ind	14,716	39.86	7,485
Chitradurga	38	Harihar	78.65	H. Siddhaveerappa	Ind	22,601	50.56	G. Veerappa	INC	22,097	49.44	504
Chitradurga	39	Davanagere	67.27	Kondajji Basappa	INC	17,809	42.65	C. K. Murthy	PSP	14,351	34.37	3,458
Chitradurga	40	Bharamasagara	61.43	G. Duggappa	Ind	18,617	54.98	M. N. K. Singh	INC	15,247	45.02	3,370
Chitradurga	41	Chitradurga	71.89	H. C. Boraiah	INC	23,906	57.05	V. T. R. Reddy	PSP	16,970	40.50	6,936
Chitradurga	42	Jagalur	74.80	J. R. Halsaswamy	INC	27,787	58.80	T. Thoriyappa	PSP	19,468	41.20	8,319
Chitradurga	43	Molakalmuru	66.48	S. H. Basanna	INC	20,801	53.54	K. B. Obaiah	PSP	17,388	44.76	3,413
Chitradurga	44	Challakere	76.28	B. L. Gowda	INC	22,194	50.84	G. V. Anjanappa	PSP	18,609	42.63	3,585
Chitradurga	45	Hiriyur	54.08	D. Manjunath	INC	17,034	51.67	Yellabovi	Ind	14,882	45.14	2,152
Chitradurga	46	Holalkere	71.84	B. Parameswarappa	SWA	18,261	44.46	G. Sivappa	INC	10,701	26.05	7,560
Chitradurga	47	Hosadurga	66.81	M. Ramappa	INC	22,157	55.48	M. V. Rudrappa	PSP	17,781	44.52	4,376
Tumkur	48	Pavagada	58.34	P. Anjinappa	INC	19,321	53.48	Ramappa	Ind	15,889	43.98	3,432
Tumkur	49	Sira	67.04	B. N. Ramegowda	INC	16,356	44.65	B. Puttakamaiah	Ind	7,242	19.77	9,114
Tumkur	50	Kallambella	61.32	B. Ganganna	INC	16,176	49.69	G. Marulappa	Ind	8,095	24.87	8,081
Tumkur	51	Gubbi	62.34	Chikkegowda	INC	11,962	35.30	B. G. Bhagavan	PSP	11,311	33.37	651
Tumkur	52	Chikkanayakanahalli	69.45	C. K. R. Setty	PSP	17,220	47.16	C. H. Lingadevaru	INC	16,852	46.15	368
Tumkur	53	Tiptur	70.04	M. S. Neelakantaswamy	INC	19,056	46.29	V. L. Shivappa	Ind	11,699	28.42	7,357
Tumkur	54	Turuvekere	71.99	M. N. Ramanna	INC	18,022	46.31	B. Byrappaji	PSP	17,065	43.85	957
Tumkur	55	Kunigal	66.81	G. Thammanna	INC	16,930	54.25	Andanaiah	PSP	11,238	36.01	5,692
Tumkur	56	Huliyurdurga	68.65	N. Huchamastigowda	Ind	15,126	45.08	D. T. Mayanna	INC	15,050	44.85	76
Tumkur	57	Gulur	48.85	G. Bovi	PSP	11,903	46.15	S. Chikkasiddaiah	INC	7,531	29.20	4,372
Tumkur	58	Tumkur	47.42	B. P. Gangadhar	PSP	10,509	45.09	G. C. Bhageerathamma	INC	7,936	34.05	2,573
Tumkur	59	Koratagere	51.81	T. S. Sivanna	INC	15,938	50.95	V. A. Reddy	Ind	7,938	25.38	8,000
Tumkur	60	Madhugiri	56.01	G. T. G. Reddy	INC	17,183	58.59	T. H. Hanumantharayappa	Ind	7,083	24.15	10,100
Kolar	61	Gowribidanur	75.17	R. N. Lakshmipathi	Ind	23,598	52.96	K. H. V. Reddi	INC	20,959	47.04	2,639
Kolar	62	Chikballapur	63.72	K. M. Puttaswamy	INC	16,302	42.87	K. Venkatakrishnappa	Ind	12,984	34.14	3,318
Kolar	63	Sidlaghatta	72.26	B. Venkatarayappa	INC	21,908	54.32	G. Papanna	Ind	18,422	45.68	3,486
Kolar	64	Bagepalli	49.06	A. Muniyappa	INC	16,517	51.62	N. Adinarayana	CPI(M)	9,408	29.40	7,109
Kolar	65	Chintamani	77.77	T. K. G. Reddy	Ind	29,975	60.34	M. C. A. Reddy	INC	19,705	39.66	10,270
Kolar	66	Srinivasapur	59.33	B. L. Narayanswamy	Ind	18,801	53.88	S. B. Reddy	INC	16,094	46.12	2,707
Kolar	67	Mulbagal	42.00	T. Channaiah	INC	13,917	53.21	P. Muniyappa	Ind	11,581	44.28	2,336
Kolar	68	Kolar Gold Field	72.51	S. R. Gopal	INC	20,024	56.75	C. M. Armugam	RPI	15,261	43.25	4,763
Kolar	69	Bethamangala	61.34	E. N. Gowda	INC	18,059	60.39	B. M. S. Gowda	Ind	11,843	39.61	6,216
Kolar	70	Kolar	58.15	P. Venkatagiriyappa	Ind	13,216	44.56	D. A. Rashid	INC	9,042	30.49	4,174
Kolar	71	Vemagal	64.23	G. N. Gowda	INC	17,014	53.76	C. Byre Gowda	Ind	12,410	39.21	4,604
Kolar	72	Malur	69.00	H. C. L. Reddy	INC	26,284	71.25	M. R. Ramanna	Ind	8,340	22.61	17,944
Bangalore	73	Malleshwaram	51.65	M. S. Krishnan	CPI(M)	12,977	30.26	T. K. T. Gowda	INC	11,641	27.14	1,336
Bangalore	74	Gandhi Nagar	51.90	Nagarathnamma Hiremath	INC	11,638	34.72	S. V. Pathi	Ind	9,238	27.56	2,400
Bangalore	75	Chickpet	61.01	V. Nagaraj	Ind	13,884	39.98	K. M. Naganna	Ind	8,835	25.44	5,049
Bangalore	76	Chamrajpet	51.39	R. D. Sagar	INC	14,241	36.84	B. K. Krishniah	Ind	10,590	27.39	3,651
Bangalore	77	Fort	52.96	T. R. Shamanna	Ind	18,116	53.03	P. N. S. Murthy	INC	7,327	21.45	10,789
Bangalore	78	Basavanagudi	45.79	P. Thimmaiah	Ind	10,495	35.40	M. Krishnappa	INC	9,653	32.56	842
Bangalore	79	Shivajinagar	50.36	H. R. A. Gaffar	INC	10,148	33.45	V. Ahmed	SWA	5,646	18.61	4,502
Bangalore	80	Bharathinagar	52.11	M. A. Amalorpavam	INC	10,808	33.15	D. Poosalingam	Ind	10,560	32.39	248
Bangalore	81	Shanti Nagar	52.86	A. Nanjappa	INC	11,345	32.88	B. Nanjappa	Ind	10,898	31.58	447
Bangalore	82	Yelahanka	63.59	B. Narayanaswamappa	Ind	16,307	49.82	K. V. B. Gowda	INC	15,046	45.97	1,261
Bangalore	83	Uttarahalli	34.77	Y. Ramakrishna	INC	11,886	67.31	C. V. Shamabhovi	Ind	1,550	8.78	10,336
Bangalore	84	Varthur	49.74	K. Prabhakar	INC	10,061	37.01	D. Munichinnappa	Ind	7,282	26.79	2,779
Bangalore	85	Kanakapura	76.07	K. G. Thimmegowda	INC	20,115	54.88	S. Kariappa	Ind	16,539	45.12	3,576
Bangalore	86	Sathanur	63.93	H. Puttadasa	Ind	13,199	44.18	S. Honnaiah	INC	12,700	42.51	499
Bangalore	87	Channapatna	76.73	T. V. Krishnappa	Ind	24,875	50.90	B. J. Lingegowda	INC	22,991	47.05	1,884
Bangalore	88	Ramanagara	55.57	B. R. Dhananjiah	Ind	22,893	65.31	T. V. Ramanna	INC	10,151	28.96	12,742
Bangalore	89	Magadi	64.54	C. R. R. Gowda	PSP	16,738	53.64	H. G. Channappa	INC	10,562	33.85	6,176
Bangalore	90	Kudur	59.92	S. Siddappa	INC	8,892	31.37	Thimmappa	PSP	8,272	29.19	620
Bangalore	91	Nelamangala	62.62	A. Hanumanthappa	INC	17,508	56.21	H. Maregowda	Ind	9,911	31.82	7,597
Bangalore	92	Doddaballapur	76.81	G. R. Gowda	Ind	23,376	49.46	A. Neelakantaiah	INC	21,822	46.17	1,554
Bangalore	93	Devanahalli	64.02	D. S. Gowdh	INC	19,439	48.91	B. Venkatarayappa	Ind	18,845	47.41	594
Bangalore	94	Hosakote	78.06	N. C. Gowda	INC	30,530	66.63	B. C. Gowda	SWA	13,337	29.11	17,193
Bangalore	95	Anekal	39.05	R. Muniswamiah	INC	12,651	56.71	B. Munivenkatappa	Ind	6,529	29.27	6,122
Mandya	96	Nagamangala	70.81	K. S Gowda	INC	24,428	57.59	T. N. Madappagowda	Ind	16,219	38.24	8,209
Mandya	97	Maddur	83.60	M. M. Gowda	INC	27,148	52.16	S. M. Krishna	PSP	22,714	43.64	4,434
Mandya	98	Kirugavalu	75.95	G. Made Gowda	INC	27,377	69.46	H. K. V. Gowdh	Ind	12,039	30.54	15,338
Mandya	99	Malavalli	57.51	M. Mallikarjunaswamy	INC	21,077	65.62	M. Mahadevaswamy	PSP	7,316	22.78	13,761
Mandya	100	Mandya	73.24	Nagappa	INC	25,462	53.54	K. Chikkalingaiah	Ind	22,099	46.46	3,363
Mandya	101	Shrirangapattana	66.00	B. Doddaboregowda	Ind	13,883	33.32	A. C. Srikantaiah	INC	13,794	33.11	89
Mandya	102	Pandavapura	65.82	N. A. Channegowda	Ind	19,460	52.18	D. Halagegowda	INC	15,599	41.83	3,861
Mandya	103	Krishnarajpete	72.11	M. K. Bommegowda	Ind	28,512	70.69	S. M. Lingappa	INC	11,048	27.39	17,464
Mysore	104	Hanur	85.35	H. Nagappa	INC	22,939	52.07	G. Venkategowda	Ind	21,113	47.93	1,826
Mysore	105	Kollegal	54.53	B. Basavaiah	INC	16,893	51.02	M. Siddamadiah	Ind	14,097	42.58	2,796
Mysore	106	Bannur	75.37	T. P. Boraiah	Ind	16,360	41.89	S. Siddiah	INC	11,950	30.60	4,410
Mysore	107	T. Narasipur	68.88	M. Rajasekara Murthy	INC	21,455	57.53	K. K. Gowda	Ind	13,339	35.77	8,116
Mysore	108	Krishnaraja	46.63	S. Channaiah	Ind	9,041	33.30	B. N. Swamy	INC	6,940	25.56	2,101
Mysore	109	Narasimharaja	52.39	Azeez Sait	SSP	13,166	44.89	B. K. Puttaiah	PSP	10,123	34.51	3,043
Mysore	110	Chamundeshwari	50.25	Kalastavadi Puttaswamy	INC	15,721	58.12	M. N. Thimmaiah	PSP	9,540	35.27	6,181
Mysore	111	Nanjangud	62.37	L. Srikantaiah	Ind	12,787	41.67	N. Rachiah	INC	8,695	28.34	4,092
Mysore	112	Biligere	62.57	D. M. Siddiah	INC	14,793	45.46	N. S. Gurusiddappa	Ind	11,975	36.80	2,818
Mysore	113	Santhemarahalli	69.06	B. Rachaiah	INC	24,082	73.31	L. H. Siddaiah	Ind	4,861	14.80	19,221
Mysore	114	Chamarajanagar	74.28	S. Puttaswamy	Ind	17,948	47.39	M. C. Basappa	INC	16,686	44.06	1,262
Mysore	115	Gundlupet	67.64	K. S. Nagarathnamma	INC	30,778	76.69	K. B. Jayadevappa	Ind	9,355	23.31	21,423
Mysore	116	Heggadadevankote	60.94	R. Peeranna	INC	20,689	67.97	H. B. Chaluviah	Ind	6,732	22.12	13,957
Mysore	117	Hunasuru	68.52	D. Devaraj Urs	INC	23,420	58.68	Thimmappa	Ind	15,583	39.04	7,837
Mysore	118	Krishnarajanagara	69.76	M. Basavaraju	Ind	10,418	29.66	S. H. R. Gowda	Ind	6,983	19.88	3,435
Mysore	119	Periyapatna	74.79	H. M. Channabasappa	Ind	31,287	77.48	K. P. Kariyappa	INC	9,095	22.52	22,192
Coorg	120	Virajpet	60.64	N. L. Naik	BJS	14,444	52.39	A. N. Belli	INC	13,128	47.61	1,316
Coorg	121	Madikeri	67.23	A. P. Appanna	INC	12,977	39.88	M. C. Nanayya	Ind	6,766	20.79	6,211
Coorg	122	Somwarpet	72.59	Gundugutti Manjanathaya	SWA	19,379	54.47	C. K. Kalappa	INC	16,201	45.53	3,178
Hassan	123	Belur	45.51	S. H. Puttarangnath	SWA	13,478	63.68	B. H. Lakshmanaiah	INC	6,887	32.54	6,591
Hassan	124	Arsikere	69.22	G. Channabasappa	INC	22,847	55.90	H. S. Siddappa	SWA	15,942	39.01	6,905
Hassan	125	Gandasi	57.14	B. Nanjappa	INC	12,971	43.10	H. R. K. Murthy	PSP	11,505	38.23	1,466
Hassan	126	Shravanabelagola	74.93	S. Shivappa	PSP	30,637	64.59	H. C. Srikantaiah	INC	16,798	35.41	13,839
Hassan	127	Holenarasipur	63.98	H. D. Deve Gowda	Ind	20,594	59.12	H. D. Doddegowda	INC	12,191	35.00	8,403
Hassan	128	Arkalgud	68.91	H. N. Nanje Gowda	SWA	22,876	64.50	G. A. T. Gowda	INC	12,589	35.50	10,287
Hassan	129	Hassan	64.22	H. B. Jwalaniah	SWA	18,212	49.35	L. T. Karle	INC	17,933	48.60	279
Hassan	130	Sakleshpur	76.98	K. P. Chikkegowda	SWA	22,650	52.74	B. G. Gurappa	INC	20,293	47.26	2,357
South Kanara	131	Sullia	63.52	A. Ramachandra	SWA	15,487	46.43	K. B. Naika	INC	15,247	45.71	240
South Kanara	132	Puttur	70.75	B. Vittaldas Shetty	INC	21,534	48.34	R. Bhat	BJS	14,102	31.66	7,432
South Kanara	133	Belthangady	66.84	Bantwal Vaikunta Baliga	INC	15,476	46.56	J. B. Pereira	SWA	7,213	21.70	8,263
South Kanara	134	Bantval	73.12	K. L. Rai	INC	20,347	47.20	A. Somayaji	Ind	10,993	25.50	9,354
South Kanara	135	Mangalore I	75.19	M. S. Nayak	INC	15,105	36.82	A. R. Ahmed	Ind	9,099	22.18	6,006
South Kanara	136	Mangalore II	71.52	B. M. Idinabba	INC	21,365	50.44	A. K. Shetmy	CPI(M)	14,051	33.17	7,314
South Kanara	137	Surathkal	75.91	P. V. Aithala	PSP	25,090	61.68	K. N. Alva	INC	15,586	38.32	9,504
South Kanara	138	Kapu	74.43	B. B. Shetty	PSP	20,956	57.17	D. R. Heggade	INC	13,771	37.57	7,185
South Kanara	139	Udupi	73.68	S. K. Amin	INC	11,737	33.35	U. S. Nayak	PSP	10,611	30.15	1,126
South Kanara	140	Brahmavar	68.65	Sowkoor Jayaprakash Shetty	Ind	22,551	62.89	F. X. D. Pinto	INC	9,909	27.63	12,642
South Kanara	141	Kundapura	68.00	W. F. Fernandes	PSP	18,881	51.76	M. M. Hegde	INC	16,360	44.85	2,521
South Kanara	142	Byndoor	56.74	S. R. Halsnad	PSP	18,700	47.99	A. G. Kodgi	INC	14,791	37.96	3,909
South Kanara	143	Karkala	68.68	B. R. Shetty	BJS	20,112	57.04	N. Hegde	INC	14,548	41.26	5,564
South Kanara	144	Moodabidri	69.05	K. R. Shetty	SWA	13,940	43.42	B. G. Das	INC	12,126	37.77	1,814
Chikmagalur	145	Sringeri	60.41	K. N. V. Gowda	INC	12,509	44.13	H. V. S. Bhatta	BJS	11,062	39.02	1,447
Chikmagalur	146	Mudigere	57.45	K. H. Ranganath	PSP	12,213	51.71	G. Puttaswamy	INC	11,407	48.29	806
Chikmagalur	147	Chikmagalur	48.25	C. M. S. Sasthri	PSP	12,397	55.32	B. L. Subbamma	INC	10,011	44.68	2,386
Chikmagalur	148	Birur	64.69	M. Mallappa	Ind	13,866	47.38	D. H. Rudrappa	INC	11,737	40.10	2,129
Chikmagalur	149	Kadur	65.70	K. M. Thammaiah	PSP	18,663	59.27	Y. M. Gangadharappa	INC	12,823	40.73	5,840
Chikmagalur	150	Tarikere	71.59	H. Shivanna	PSP	22,107	60.88	T. R. Parameshwaraiah	INC	12,261	33.77	9,846
Shimoga	151	Channagiri	70.15	N. G. Halappa	SSP	27,077	62.68	K. Rudrappa	INC	16,122	37.32	10,955
Shimoga	152	Bhadravati	63.59	Abdul Anwar	PSP	15,862	39.95	D. R. Gurushantappa	INC	15,380	38.73	482
Shimoga	153	Honnali	69.00	D. Parameshwarappa	INC	19,045	48.53	H. B. Kadasiddappa	Ind	14,960	38.12	4,085
Shimoga	154	Shimoga	59.43	A. R. Badrinarayan	INC	18,695	47.54	Y. R. Parameshwarappa	SSP	11,598	29.50	7,097
Shimoga	155	Tirthahalli	74.70	Shantaveri Gopala Gowda	SSP	21,963	57.46	B. S. Viswanath	INC	16,262	42.54	5,701
Shimoga	156	Hosanagar	66.35	I. Somasekharappa	INC	14,535	46.41	B. S. Rao	SSP	12,400	39.60	2,135
Shimoga	157	Sagar	65.55	K. H. Sreenivasa	INC	11,860	47.88	Kagodu Thimmappa	SSP	11,111	44.86	749
Shimoga	158	Soraba	76.98	Sarekoppa Bangarappa	SSP	25,724	62.31	M. P. Eswarappa	INC	14,990	36.31	10,734
Shimoga	159	Shikaripura	61.14	G. Basavannappa	SSP	21,241	69.72	Veerappa	INC	9,227	30.28	12,014
Uttara Kannada	160	Sirsi	61.55	M. H. Jayaprakashanarayan	PSP	11,282	39.15	R. S. Purushottam	INC	10,516	36.49	766
Uttara Kannada	161	Bhatkal	53.18	J. M. Manjanath	PSP	16,655	55.97	H. R. Suraya	INC	9,224	31.00	7,431
Uttara Kannada	162	Kumta	65.97	H. R. Manjanath	Ind	25,049	70.75	M. V. Vimalanand	INC	8,957	25.30	16,092
Uttara Kannada	163	Ankola	60.87	N. D. Sarveshwar	PSP	14,352	46.39	A. G. Venkatesh	INC	8,418	27.21	5,934
Uttara Kannada	164	Karwar	66.95	K. D. Purso	Ind	23,079	62.65	G. S. Dattatraya	INC	13,759	37.35	9,320
Uttara Kannada	165	Haliyal	65.34	H. R. Mableshwar	INC	17,410	50.45	P. V. R. Bheemaraya	Ind	8,664	25.10	8,746
Dharwad	166	Dharwad Rural	62.47	A. S. Vishwanathaprasad	INC	22,267	70.86	S. V. Veerabasayyaswami	SWA	9,157	29.14	13,110
Dharwad	167	Dharwad	61.69	D. K. Mahaboobsab	INC	15,325	53.98	S. B. Y. Laxman	BJS	11,786	41.52	3,539
Dharwad	168	Hubli City	63.22	S. S. Shankarappa	BJS	14,898	43.60	H. M. Mirasaheb	INC	9,830	28.77	5,068
Dharwad	169	Hubli Rural	61.23	P. M. Ramangouda	INC	22,540	64.27	K. C. Shiddappa	BJS	8,713	24.84	13,827
Dharwad	170	Kalghatgi	71.72	P. P. Shivanagouda	Ind	20,188	62.39	P. A. Shiddanagouda	INC	12,170	37.61	8,018
Dharwad	171	Kundgol	68.63	B. S. Rayappa	Ind	20,291	63.21	K. T. Kenchappa	INC	9,371	29.19	10,920
Dharwad	172	Shiggaon	—	S. Nijalingappa	INC	Unopposed		—				
Dharwad	173	Hangal	68.87	P. B. Rudragouda	Ind	18,742	50.14	S. S. Chanabasappa	INC	16,781	44.89	1,961
Dharwad	174	Hirekerur	75.63	G. S. Basalingappagouda	INC	30,368	66.75	B. B. Gadlappa	PSP	15,126	33.25	15,242
Dharwad	175	Ranibennur	71.59	B. N. Lingappa	PSP	25,550	61.71	M. B. Uliweppa	INC	15,262	36.86	10,288
Dharwad	176	Byadgi	73.60	B. M. Gadigeppa	PSP	23,055	61.41	M. S. Mahadevappa	INC	13,928	37.10	9,127
Dharwad	177	Haveri	58.98	Basavaraj Magavi	INC	20,494	59.37	Panchakshari Valasangada	CPI(M)	11,905	34.49	8,589
Dharwad	178	Shirahatti	78.33	Shiddaiah Kashimath	SWA	23,646	51.06	M. L. Venkatesh	INC	22,661	48.94	985
Dharwad	179	Mundargi	74.35	C. C. Mahantayya	INC	26,220	59.90	P. M. Martandagouda	Ind	17,552	40.10	8,668
Dharwad	180	Gadag	81.46	P. K. Hanamantagouda	Ind	27,759	55.11	M. V. Rudrappagouda	INC	22,609	44.89	5,150
Dharwad	181	Ron	70.30	Andanappa Doddameti	INC	21,573	61.89	P. M. Sanganagouda	Ind	13,285	38.11	8,288
Dharwad	182	Nargund	41.80	D. R. Veerappa	INC	14,402	73.52	M. M. Mudakappa	SSP	4,714	24.06	9,688
Dharwad	183	Navalgund	76.57	P. R. Marigouda	INC	25,973	74.64	B. B. Mallaoppa	Ind	7,791	22.39	18,182
Belagavi	184	Ramdurg	69.76	P. S. Madevappa	INC	26,386	66.51	H. B. Basappa	Ind	11,768	29.66	14,618
Belagavi	185	Parasgad	69.63	K. H. Veerabhadrappa	INC	21,916	51.80	P. S. Bindurao	Ind	20,396	48.20	1,520
Belagavi	186	Bailhongal	62.94	B. B. Annappa	INC	27,656	80.70	C. S. Irasangappa	Ind	6,614	19.30	21,042
Belagavi	187	Kittur	62.78	S. B. Mallappa	INC	31,281	86.93	Y. B. Shantalingappa	Ind	4,357	12.11	26,924
Belagavi	188	Khanapur	75.80	S. N. Bhagwantrao	Ind	21,281	48.27	T. K. Ningappa	INC	14,490	32.87	6,791
Belagavi	189	Belagavi City	84.24	Balwant Sayanak	Ind	27,818	52.64	P. B. Bharmagauda	INC	24,224	45.84	3,594
Belagavi	190	Uchagaon	73.04	N. P. Bharaman	Ind	28,066	72.69	B. B. Peter	INC	10,543	27.31	17,523
Belagavi	191	Hire Bagewadi	77.28	P. C. Lingappa	INC	26,092	62.41	K. M. Basawani	Ind	15,005	35.89	11,087
Belagavi	192	Gokak	58.95	L. S. Naik	INC	17,522	56.02	P. H. Karaning	Ind	7,144	22.84	10,378
Belagavi	193	Arabhavi	54.45	A. R. Panchaganvi	INC	18,584	63.34	A. Y. Siddappa	Ind	5,708	19.46	12,876
Belagavi	194	Hukkeri	60.57	Appanagouda Bagewadi	INC	15,933	51.82	M. S. Shivalingappa	Ind	13,345	43.40	2,588
Belagavi	195	Sankeshwar	67.03	S. D. Kothawale	INC	19,828	60.08	S. Y. Patil	Ind	6,063	18.37	13,765
Belagavi	196	Nippani	84.59	Govind Manavi	Ind	29,041	61.67	M. S. Yeshwantapa	INC	17,575	37.32	11,466
Belagavi	197	Sadalga	76.86	Shidagouda Patil	INC	25,518	60.19	U. C. Balapa	Ind	14,713	34.70	10,805
Belagavi	198	Chikkodi	53.73	S. B. Sidray	INC	21,455	78.54	M. A. Devaray	RPI	4,273	15.64	17,182
Belagavi	199	Raibag	63.78	V. L. Patil	INC	31,732	81.97	N. B. Kamappa	Ind	6,981	18.03	24,751
Belagavi	200	Kagwad	42.13	B. C. Peeraji	INC	18,544	79.68	T. S. Pradhani	RPI	3,451	14.83	15,093
Belagavi	201	Athani	60.39	Dhairyashil Pawar	INC	26,018	70.68	Anagouda Patil	Ind	7,908	21.48	18,110
Bijapur	202	Jamkhandi	76.66	B. D. Jatti	INC	24,578	53.62	M. M. Shivappa	Ind	21,261	46.38	3,317
Bijapur	203	Bilgi	61.71	Rachappa Desai	INC	26,016	72.44	T. B. Venkappa	PSP	7,844	21.84	18,172
Bijapur	204	Mudhol	70.27	N. K. Pandappa	SWA	20,186	51.85	N. N. Kallappa	INC	17,922	46.03	2,264
Bijapur	205	Bagalkot	58.27	Basappa Muranal	INC	19,903	58.06	M. T. Karabasappa	Ind	11,537	33.65	8,366
Bijapur	206	Badami	73.58	P. K. Mahagundappa	Ind	25,849	63.44	P. V. Hanamantagouda	INC	14,897	36.56	10,952
Bijapur	207	Guledgud	63.30	P. M. Rudrappa	INC	16,778	52.60	Shrinivas Kasat	BJS	15,119	47.40	1,659
Bijapur	208	Hungund	62.47	K. S. Rudrappa	INC	23,364	69.25	N. G. Parayya	Ind	9,732	28.84	13,632
Bijapur	209	Muddebihal	60.49	G. S. Mallappa	INC	19,452	55.90	M. S. Channappa	SWA	14,740	42.36	4,712
Bijapur	210	Huvina Hippargi	54.37	P. G. Ninganagounda	INC	15,189	68.30	H. K. Martandappa	SWA	7,050	31.70	8,139
Bijapur	211	Basavana Bagevadi	51.75	Somanagouda Patil	INC	25,173	90.12	G. B. Irayya	Ind	2,759	9.88	22,414
Bijapur	212	Tikota	42.86	V. S. Basalingayya	INC	16,329	69.56	N. K. Upadhayaya	CPI(M)	3,353	14.28	12,976
Bijapur	213	Bijapur	53.98	P. B. Mallanagauda	INC	18,818	67.82	N. D. S. B. Karabasappa	Ind	5,396	19.45	13,422
Bijapur	214	Ballolli	49.30	Siddharth Arakeri	RPI	14,653	57.71	K. J. Laxman	INC	10,738	42.29	3,915
Bijapur	215	Indi	62.45	S. M. Karabasappa	SWA	15,769	48.58	K. R. Ramagondappa	INC	11,703	36.05	4,066
Bijapur	216	Sindagi	52.94	Channappa Desai	INC	16,668	55.62	S. Y. Patil	Ind	13,298	44.38	3,370
