= Varthur Assembly constituency =

Former Assembly constituency in Karnataka, India

Coordinates: 12.9°N 77.7°E

Varthur
- Former constituency for the Karnataka Legislative Assembly

Constituency details
- Country: India
- Region: South India
- State: Karnataka
- District: Bangalore Urban
- Established: 1967
- Abolished: 2008
- Reservation: None

Varthur Assembly constituency was one of the constituencies in Karnataka Legislative Assembly in India. It was abolished in the 2008 delimitation exercise, which redrew the boundaries of constituencies.

== Members of the Legislative Assembly ==
Election	Member	Party
1967	K. Prabhakar	Indian National Congress
1972	K. Prabhakar	Indian National Congress
1978	B. V. Ramachandra Reddy	Janata Party
1983	S. Suryanarayana Rao	Communist Party of India
1985	A. Krishnappa	Indian National Congress
1989	A. Krishnappa	Indian National Congress
1994	Ashwatha Narayana Reddy	Janata Dal
1999	A. Krishnappa	Indian National Congress
2004	A. Krishnappa	Indian National Congress

== Election results ==
=== Assembly Election 2004 ===
2004 Karnataka Legislative Assembly election : Varthur
Party	Candidate	Votes	%	±%
INC	A. Krishnappa	127,490	49.52%	▼1.61
BJP	Ashwatha Narayana Reddy	114,352	44.42%	New
JD(S)	Ravi Prakash	8,349	3.24%	▼0.09
BSP	Bhaskar Reddy. P	2,649	1.03%	New
Margin of victory		13,138	5.10%	▼7.13
Turnout		257,458	50.44%	▼2.04
Total valid votes		257,458		
Registered electors		510,436		▲25.57
INC hold		Swing	▼1.61	

=== Assembly Election 1999 ===
1999 Karnataka Legislative Assembly election : Varthur
Party	Candidate	Votes	%	±%
INC	A. Krishnappa	109,076	51.13%	▲16.50
JD(U)	Ashwatha Narayana Reddy	82,975	38.89%	New
JD(S)	M. Shankar	7,103	3.33%	New
CPI(M)	Gopala Gowda. H. N	6,876	3.22%	New
Independent	Ramanuj Singh	2,087	0.98%	New
Independent	K. Sathya Narayana	1,881	0.88%	New
Independent	I. P. Muniyappa	1,684	0.79%	New
Independent	A. Krishnappa	1,654	0.78%	New
Margin of victory		26,101	12.23%	▼4.30
Turnout		213,336	52.48%	▼8.88
Total valid votes		213,336		
Registered electors		406,494		▲43.24
INC gain from JD		Swing	▼0.03	

=== Assembly Election 1994 ===
1994 Karnataka Legislative Assembly election : Varthur
Party	Candidate	Votes	%	±%
JD	Ashwatha Narayana Reddy	87,295	51.16%	▲7.90
INC	A. Krishnappa	59,085	34.63%	▼13.63
BJP	N. Thimma Reddy	19,233	11.27%	▲8.97
INC	V. Premakumaraiah	1,453	0.85%	New
Margin of victory		28,210	16.53%	▲11.53
Turnout		174,136	61.36%	▲2.63
Total valid votes		170,619		
Rejected ballots		3,303	1.90%	▼2.41
Registered electors		283,793		▲10.62
JD gain from INC		Swing	▲2.90	

=== Assembly Election 1989 ===
1989 Karnataka Legislative Assembly election : Varthur
Party	Candidate	Votes	%	±%
INC	A. Krishnappa	69,586	48.26%	▲14.42
JD	Ashwatha Narayana Reddy	62,375	43.26%	New
JP	R. Ananda Reddy	4,526	3.14%	New
BJP	M. Venkataswamy	3,316	2.30%	▼6.54
Independent	K. Krishnan	913	0.63%	New
Margin of victory		7,211	5.00%	▲4.89
Turnout		150,677	58.73%	▲2.80
Total valid votes		144,182		
Rejected ballots		6,495	4.31%	▲2.53
Registered electors		256,538		▲57.73
INC hold		Swing	▲14.42	

=== Assembly Election 1985 ===
1985 Karnataka Legislative Assembly election : Varthur
Party	Candidate	Votes	%	±%
INC	A. Krishnappa	30,242	33.84%	▼1.03
Independent	Ashwatha Narayana Reddy	30,144	33.73%	New
CPI(M)	S. Suryanarayana Rao	17,871	20.00%	▼39.08
BJP	N. Thimma Reddy	7,896	8.84%	▲6.59
Independent	N. Krishnachari	710	0.79%	New
Independent	A. Somashekar Reddy	616	0.69%	New
Margin of victory		98	0.11%	▼24.10
Turnout		90,972	55.93%	▼9.56
Total valid votes		89,357		
Rejected ballots		1,615	1.78%	▼0.54
Registered electors		162,648		▲27.14
INC gain from CPI(M)		Swing	▼25.24	

=== Assembly Election 1983 ===
1983 Karnataka Legislative Assembly election : Varthur
Party	Candidate	Votes	%	±%
CPI(M)	S. Suryanarayana Rao	48,344	59.08%	▲49.01
INC	B. V. Ramachandra Reddy	28,533	34.87%	▲30.78
BJP	M. Ramachandra	1,845	2.25%	New
LKD	P. H. Krishnappa	746	0.91%	New
Margin of victory		19,811	24.21%	▲10.84
Turnout		83,777	65.49%	▼5.62
Total valid votes		81,834		
Rejected ballots		1,943	2.32%	▼0.39
Registered electors		127,925		▲27.12
CPI(M) gain from JP		Swing	▲17.99	

=== Assembly Election 1978 ===
1978 Karnataka Legislative Assembly election : Varthur
Party	Candidate	Votes	%	±%
JP	B. V. Ramachandra Reddy	28,613	41.09%	New
INC(I)	H. T. Somashekara Reddy	19,301	27.72%	New
Independent	G. T. Mariswamy Reddy	7,651	10.99%	New
CPI(M)	S. Suryanarayana Rao	7,009	10.07%	New
Independent	A. T. Ranganatha	4,000	5.74%	New
INC	Ramaswamy	2,849	4.09%	▼56.27
Margin of victory		9,312	13.37%	▼11.89
Turnout		71,565	71.11%	▲30.62
Total valid votes		69,627		
Rejected ballots		1,938	2.71%	▲2.71
Registered electors		100,633		▲20.28
JP gain from INC		Swing	▼19.27	

=== Assembly Election 1972 ===
1972 Mysore State Legislative Assembly election : Varthur
Party	Candidate	Votes	%	±%
INC	K. Prabhakar	19,774	60.36%	▲23.35
INC(O)	D. Munichinnappa	11,500	35.11%	New
Independent	Munishamy	1,484	4.53%	New
Margin of victory		8,274	25.26%	▲15.04
Turnout		33,879	40.49%	▼9.25
Total valid votes		32,758		
Registered electors		83,667		▲37.73
INC hold		Swing	▲23.35	

=== Assembly Election 1967 ===
1967 Mysore State Legislative Assembly election : Varthur
Party	Candidate	Votes	%	±%
INC	K. Prabhakar	10,061	37.01%	New
Independent	D. Munichinnappa	7,282	26.79%	New
Independent	K. Chickanna	5,939	21.85%	New
RPI	T. K. Murthy	1,943	7.15%	New
SWA	H. V. Nanjiah	1,140	4.19%	New
Independent	B. Ramappa	817	3.01%	New
Margin of victory		2,779	10.22%	
Turnout		30,212	49.74%	
Total valid votes		27,182		
Registered electors		60,745		
INC win (new seat)				

== See also ==
- List of constituencies of Karnataka Legislative Assembly
