= Fort Assembly constituency =

Former Assembly constituency in Karnataka, India

Coordinates: 12.962846°N 77.575889°E

Fort
- Former constituency No. 77 for the State Legislative Assembly

Constituency details
- Country: India
- State: Mysore State
- Division: Bangalore
- District: Bangalore
- Lok Sabha constituency: Bangalore
- Established: 1967
- Abolished: 1978
- Reservation: None

Fort Assembly constituency was one of the constituencies in Mysore state assembly in India until 1978 when it was made defunct. It was part of Bangalore Lok Sabha constituency.

== Jurisdiction ==
The places under the constituency: Chamarajpet (East), Fort, Visveswarapuram, Shankarapuram, Kempegowdanagar, Hanumantanagar and Basaveshwara Temple divisions of Bangalore Mahanagara Palike.

== Members of the Legislative Assembly ==
Election	Member	Party
1967	T. R. Shamanna	Independent politician
1972	T. R. Shamanna	Independent politician

== Election results ==
=== Assembly Election 1972 ===
1972 Mysore State Legislative Assembly election : Fort
Party	Candidate	Votes	%	±%
Independent	T. R. Shamanna	13,625	33.13%	New
INC	D. S. Narasinga Rao	11,209	27.26%	▲5.81
Independent	T. K. Thimmarayi Gowda	9,262	22.52%	New
ABJS	K. G. Subbarama Setty	6,746	16.41%	▲7.07
Margin of victory		2,416	5.88%	▼25.70
Turnout		42,201	53.01%	▲0.05
Total valid votes		41,120		
Registered electors		79,602		▲18.69
Independent hold		Swing	▼19.90	

=== Assembly Election 1967 ===
1967 Mysore State Legislative Assembly election : Fort
Party	Candidate	Votes	%	±%
Independent	T. R. Shamanna	18,116	53.03%	New
INC	P. N. S. Murthy	7,327	21.45%	New
Independent	M. K. T. Prabhu	5,529	16.18%	New
ABJS	G. Setty	3,192	9.34%	New
Margin of victory		10,789	31.58%	
Turnout		35,522	52.96%	
Total valid votes		34,164		
Registered electors		67,069		
Independent win (new seat)				

== See also ==
- List of constituencies of the Mysore Legislative Assembly
