= Kudur Assembly constituency =

Former Assembly constituency in Karnataka, India

Coordinates: 13.107989°N 77.165269°E

Kudur
- Former constituency No. 90 for the State Legislative Assembly

Constituency details
- Country: India
- State: Mysore State
- Division: Bangalore
- District: Bangalore
- Lok Sabha constituency: Kanakapura
- Established: 1967
- Abolished: 1978
- Reservation: None

Kudur Assembly constituency was one of the constituencies in Mysore state assembly in India until 1978 when it was made defunct. It was part of Kanakapura Lok Sabha constituency.

== Members of the Legislative Assembly ==
Election	Member	Party
1967	S. Siddappa	Indian National Congress
1972	Bettaswamy Gowda	Independent politician

== Election results ==
=== Assembly Election 1972 ===
1972 Mysore State Legislative Assembly election : Kudur
Party	Candidate	Votes	%	±%
Independent	Bettaswamy Gowda	24,848	58.38%	New
INC	T. D. Maranna	17,715	41.62%	▲10.25
Margin of victory		7,133	16.76%	▲14.57
Turnout		43,507	70.01%	▲10.09
Total valid votes		42,563		
Registered electors		62,141		▲20.47
Independent gain from INC		Swing	▲27.01	

=== Assembly Election 1967 ===
1967 Mysore State Legislative Assembly election : Kudur
Party	Candidate	Votes	%	±%
INC	S. Siddappa	8,892	31.37%	New
PSP	Thimmappa	8,272	29.19%	New
Independent	T. D. Maranna	8,133	28.70%	New
Independent	H. S. Ganganna	1,841	6.50%	New
Independent	Gangappa	1,204	4.25%	New
Margin of victory		620	2.19%	
Turnout		30,910	59.92%	
Total valid votes		28,342		
Registered electors		51,582		
INC win (new seat)				

== See also ==
- List of constituencies of the Mysore Legislative Assembly
