= Gulur Assembly constituency =

Former Assembly constituency in Karnataka, India

Coordinates: 13.292245°N 77.092609°E

Gulur
- Former constituency for the State Legislative Assembly

Constituency details
- Country: India
- State: Mysore state
- Division: Bangalore
- District: Tumkur
- Lok Sabha constituency: Tumkur
- Established: 1967
- Abolished: 1978
- Reservation: SC

Gulur Assembly constituency was one of the constituencies in Mysore state assembly in India until 1978 when it was made defunct. It was part of Tumkur Lok Sabha constituency.

== Members of the Legislative Assembly ==
Election	Member	Party
1967	G. Bovi	Praja Socialist Party
1972	Dodda Thimmaiah	Indian National Congress

== Election results ==
=== Assembly Election 1972 ===
1972 Mysore State Legislative Assembly election : Gulur
Party	Candidate	Votes	%	±%
INC	Dodda Thimmaiah	18,307	52.59%	▲23.39
INC(O)	Gangabovi	15,448	44.38%	New
ABJS	Chikkamariyappa	1,056	3.03%	New
Margin of victory		2,859	8.21%	▼8.74
Turnout		35,648	55.26%	▲6.41
Total valid votes		34,811		
Registered electors		64,514		▲12.57
INC gain from PSP		Swing	▲6.44	

=== Assembly Election 1967 ===
1967 Mysore State Legislative Assembly election : Gulur
Party	Candidate	Votes	%	±%
PSP	G. Bovi	11,903	46.15%	New
INC	S. Chikkasiddaiah	7,531	29.20%	New
Independent	L. Lingaiah	3,582	13.89%	New
Independent	Ramagiriyappa	1,261	4.89%	New
Independent	T. N. Lakshminarasimhaiam	1,048	4.06%	New
SWA	C. N. Avenkatanarasappa	468	1.81%	New
Margin of victory		4,372	16.95%	
Turnout		27,993	48.85%	
Total valid votes		25,793		
Registered electors		57,308		
PSP win (new seat)				

== See also ==
- List of constituencies of the Mysore Legislative Assembly
