= Bethamangala Assembly constituency =

Former constituency in Karnataka, India

Coordinates: 13.01°N 78.33°E

Bethamangala
- Former constituency for the Karnataka Legislative Assembly

Constituency details
- Country: India
- Region: South India
- State: Karnataka
- District: Kolar
- Lok Sabha constituency: Kolar
- Established: 1967
- Abolished: 2008
- Reservation: None

Bethamangala Assembly constituency was one of the 224 constituencies in the Karnataka Legislative Assembly of Karnataka a southern state of India. It was also part of Kolar Lok Sabha constituency.

== Members of the Legislative Assembly ==
Election	Member	Party
1967	E. N. Gowda	Indian National Congress
1972	K. M. Doreswamy Naidu	Independent politician
1978	C. Venkateshappa	Indian National Congress
1983	C. Venkateshappa	Indian National Congress
1985	A. Chinnappa	Janata Party
1989	M. Narayanaswamy	Janata Dal
1994	M. Narayanaswamy	Janata Dal
1999	C. Venkateshappa	Indian National Congress
2004	Venkatamuniyappa B. P	Bharatiya Janata Party

== Election results ==
=== Assembly Election 2004 ===
2004 Karnataka Legislative Assembly election : Bethamangala
Party	Candidate	Votes	%	±%
BJP	Venkatamuniyappa B. P	41,117	33.54%	New
Independent	M. Narayanaswamy	40,570	33.09%	New
INC	Ramachandra	32,096	26.18%	▼42.75
Independent	Ravi	3,150	2.57%	New
JD(S)	Dr. Mohan. C	1,768	1.44%	▲0.01
JP	Srinivasaiah. V	1,657	1.35%	New
Independent	Krishnappa. A	1,203	0.98%	New
Kannada Nadu Party	Sampathkumar Kv	1,043	0.85%	New
Margin of victory		547	0.45%	▼38.85
Turnout		122,612	68.89%	▼1.89
Total valid votes		122,604		
Registered electors		177,972		▲8.85
BJP gain from INC		Swing	▼35.39	

=== Assembly Election 1999 ===
1999 Karnataka Legislative Assembly election : Bethamangala
Party	Candidate	Votes	%	±%
INC	C. Venkateshappa	75,844	68.93%	▲64.36
JD(U)	M. Narayanaswamy	32,604	29.63%	New
JD(S)	V. Srinivasan	1,578	1.43%	New
Margin of victory		43,240	39.30%	▲34.75
Turnout		115,726	70.78%	▼1.09
Total valid votes		110,026		
Rejected ballots		5,625	4.86%	▲2.89
Registered electors		163,498		▲12.24
INC gain from JD		Swing	▲26.88	

=== Assembly Election 1994 ===
1994 Karnataka Legislative Assembly election : Bethamangala
Party	Candidate	Votes	%	±%
JD	M. Narayanaswamy	43,157	42.05%	▲5.90
Independent	C. Venkateshappa	38,483	37.50%	New
BJP	V. Hanumappa	7,353	7.17%	New
INC	G. Nagaraja	6,123	5.97%	New
INC	M. Srikrishna	4,686	4.57%	▼22.85
BSP	Dr. M. Ravichandra	790	0.77%	New
Margin of victory		4,674	4.55%	▼1.72
Turnout		104,681	71.87%	▲6.01
Total valid votes		102,622		
Rejected ballots		2,059	1.97%	▼6.92
Registered electors		145,662		▲12.19
JD hold		Swing	▲5.90	

=== Assembly Election 1989 ===
1989 Karnataka Legislative Assembly election : Bethamangala
Party	Candidate	Votes	%	±%
JD	M. Narayanaswamy	28,162	36.15%	New
Independent	C. Venkateshappa	23,281	29.89%	New
INC	V. Venkatesh	21,358	27.42%	▲0.05
JP	M. Narayanaswamy	1,939	2.49%	New
Independent	Venkateshappa	713	0.92%	New
Independent	R. Muniswamy	576	0.74%	New
Independent	Venhateshappa	482	0.62%	New
Margin of victory		4,881	6.27%	▼31.49
Turnout		85,501	65.86%	▲5.93
Total valid votes		77,896		
Rejected ballots		7,605	8.89%	▲7.12
Registered electors		129,830		▲28.14
JD gain from JP		Swing	▼28.98	

=== Assembly Election 1985 ===
1985 Karnataka Legislative Assembly election : Bethamangala
Party	Candidate	Votes	%	±%
JP	A. Chinnappa	38,843	65.13%	▲56.45
INC	V. Venkatamuni	16,321	27.37%	▼11.49
Independent	A. Pulieindiran	2,570	4.31%	New
Independent	D. Balu	861	1.44%	New
Independent	B. H. Hunumappa	393	0.66%	New
Independent	M. Narayanaswamy	378	0.63%	New
Margin of victory		22,522	37.76%	▲37.57
Turnout		60,716	59.93%	▲1.66
Total valid votes		59,640		
Rejected ballots		1,076	1.77%	▼1.19
Registered electors		101,316		▲9.93
JP gain from INC		Swing	▲26.27	

=== Assembly Election 1983 ===
1983 Karnataka Legislative Assembly election : Bethamangala
Party	Candidate	Votes	%	±%
INC	C. Venkateshappa	20,253	38.86%	▲24.34
Independent	Lakshmamma Narayanaraju	20,152	38.67%	New
JP	P. Narayanamma	4,525	8.68%	▼18.42
IC(S)	N. Ravi	2,100	4.03%	New
Independent	G. Narayanan	2,080	3.99%	New
Independent	D. Balu	1,320	2.53%	New
Independent	Lorry Venkatashappa	667	1.28%	New
Independent	R. Muniswamy	612	1.17%	New
Independent	Ramappa	347	0.67%	New
Margin of victory		101	0.19%	▼25.99
Turnout		53,703	58.27%	▼4.31
Total valid votes		52,114		
Rejected ballots		1,589	2.96%	▲0.11
Registered electors		92,167		▲7.73
INC gain from INC(I)		Swing	▼14.42	

=== Assembly Election 1978 ===
1978 Karnataka Legislative Assembly election : Bethamangala
Party	Candidate	Votes	%	±%
INC(I)	C. Venkateshappa	27,715	53.28%	New
JP	T. Channaiah	14,098	27.10%	New
INC	M. Narayana	7,554	14.52%	▼25.95
Independent	Ramappa	1,168	2.25%	New
Independent	V. Bhimanna	818	1.57%	New
Independent	W. Muniyappa	663	1.27%	New
Margin of victory		13,617	26.18%	▲9.73
Turnout		53,541	62.58%	▼1.15
Total valid votes		52,016		
Rejected ballots		1,525	2.85%	▲2.85
Registered electors		85,555		▲47.87
INC(I) gain from Independent		Swing	▼3.64	

=== Assembly Election 1972 ===
1972 Mysore State Legislative Assembly election : Bethamangala
Party	Candidate	Votes	%	±%
Independent	K. M. Doreswamy Naidu	20,380	56.92%	New
INC	K. C. Venkatesh	14,490	40.47%	▼19.92
Independent	C. Padamanabhan	550	1.54%	New
Independent	K. A. Gangadharam	386	1.08%	New
Margin of victory		5,890	16.45%	▼4.34
Turnout		36,876	63.73%	▲2.39
Total valid votes		35,806		
Registered electors		57,860		▲11.89
Independent gain from INC		Swing	▼3.47	

=== Assembly Election 1967 ===
1967 Mysore State Legislative Assembly election : Bethamangala
Party	Candidate	Votes	%	±%
INC	E. N. Gowda	18,059	60.39%	New
Independent	B. M. S. Gowda	11,843	39.61%	New
Margin of victory		6,216	20.79%	
Turnout		31,722	61.34%	
Total valid votes		29,902		
Registered electors		51,711		
INC win (new seat)				

== See also ==
- Kolar district
- List of constituencies of Karnataka Legislative Assembly
