= Huvina Hippargi Assembly constituency =

Former Assembly constituency in Karnataka, India

Coordinates: 16.558522°N 76.076502°E

Huvina Hippargi
- Former constituency No. 218 for the Karnataka Legislative Assembly

Constituency details
- Country: India
- Region: South India
- State: Karnataka
- Division: Belagavi
- District: Bijapur
- Lok Sabha constituency: Bijapur
- Established: 1967
- Abolished: 2008
- Reservation: None

Huvina Hippargi Assembly constituency was one of the constituencies in Karnataka state assembly in India until 2008 when it was made defunct. It was part of Bijapur Lok Sabha constituency.

== Members of the Legislative Assembly ==
Election	Member	Party
1967	P. G. Ninganagounda	Indian National Congress
1972	K. D. Patil	Indian National Congress
1978	Patil Basangouda Somanagouda	Janata Party
1983	Basanagoud Somanagoud Patil	Indian National Congress
1985	Shivputrappa Madiwalappa Desai	Janata Party
1989	Basanagoud Somanagoud Patil	Indian National Congress
1994	Shivputrappa Madiwalappa Desai	Janata Dal
1999	Basanagoud Somanagoud Patil	Indian National Congress
2004	Shivputrappa Madiwalappa Desai	Bharatiya Janata Party

== Election results ==
=== Assembly Election 2004 ===
2004 Karnataka Legislative Assembly election : Huvina Hippargi
Party	Candidate	Votes	%	±%
BJP	Shivputrappa Madiwalappa Desai	39,224	43.61%	New
INC	Patil. B. S	32,927	36.61%	▼19.50
JD(S)	Patil Malakendragouda Basangowda	12,774	14.20%	▲6.27
Independent	Patil Mahmadumar Rajapatel	1,767	1.96%	New
Kannada Nadu Party	Patil Sangangouda Dyamangowda	1,652	1.84%	New
JP	Hosakoti Namdev Ramappa	1,591	1.77%	New
Margin of victory		6,297	7.00%	▼14.42
Turnout		89,949	58.67%	▼4.70
Total valid votes		89,935		
Registered electors		153,302		▲12.33
BJP gain from INC		Swing	▼12.50	

=== Assembly Election 1999 ===
1999 Karnataka Legislative Assembly election : Huvina Hippargi
Party	Candidate	Votes	%	±%
INC	Basanagoud Somanagoud Patil	46,088	56.11%	▲24.02
JD(U)	Shivputrappa Madiwalappa Desai	28,492	34.69%	New
JD(S)	Patil Rayana Gouda Basanagouda	6,510	7.93%	New
BSP	Talikoti Imamsab Dastageersa	1,042	1.27%	New
Margin of victory		17,596	21.42%	▲4.39
Turnout		86,487	63.37%	▲2.26
Total valid votes		82,132		
Rejected ballots		4,355	5.04%	▲1.89
Registered electors		136,471		▲10.65
INC gain from JD		Swing	▲6.99	

=== Assembly Election 1994 ===
1994 Karnataka Legislative Assembly election : Huvina Hippargi
Party	Candidate	Votes	%	±%
JD	Shivputrappa Madiwalappa Desai	35,849	49.12%	▲18.51
INC	Patil. B. S	23,422	32.09%	▼20.75
BJP	Kumbar. B. S	6,080	8.33%	▲7.47
INC	Patil. S. G	4,707	6.45%	New
Independent	Madar. R. M	686	0.94%	New
Independent	Chittaragi. R. T	659	0.90%	New
Independent	Naikodi. S. G	491	0.67%	New
Margin of victory		12,427	17.03%	▼5.21
Turnout		75,362	61.11%	▼2.95
Total valid votes		72,987		
Rejected ballots		2,375	3.15%	▼1.59
Registered electors		123,331		▲8.71
JD gain from INC		Swing	▼3.72	

=== Assembly Election 1989 ===
1989 Karnataka Legislative Assembly election : Huvina Hippargi
Party	Candidate	Votes	%	±%
INC	Basanagoud Somanagoud Patil	36,588	52.84%	▲6.95
JD	Shivputrappa Madiwalappa Desai	21,193	30.61%	New
JP	Patil Basanagoud Linganagoud	10,582	15.28%	New
BJP	Biradar Nanagoud Mallanagoud	598	0.86%	▼0.63
Margin of victory		15,395	22.24%	▲16.00
Turnout		72,680	64.06%	▼6.19
Total valid votes		69,237		
Rejected ballots		3,443	4.74%	▲2.32
Registered electors		113,452		▲27.69
INC gain from JP		Swing	▲0.72	

=== Assembly Election 1985 ===
1985 Karnataka Legislative Assembly election : Huvina Hippargi
Party	Candidate	Votes	%	±%
JP	Shivputrappa Madiwalappa Desai	31,748	52.12%	▲17.49
INC	Basanagoud Somanagoud Patil	27,949	45.89%	▼12.85
BJP	Patil Sanganagouda Irappagouda	910	1.49%	New
Margin of victory		3,799	6.24%	▼17.88
Turnout		62,419	70.25%	▲3.49
Total valid votes		60,909		
Rejected ballots		1,510	2.42%	▼1.34
Registered electors		88,847		▲10.59
JP gain from INC		Swing	▼6.62	

=== Assembly Election 1983 ===
1983 Karnataka Legislative Assembly election : Huvina Hippargi
Party	Candidate	Votes	%	±%
INC	Basanagoud Somanagoud Patil	30,320	58.74%	▲55.84
JP	Patil Basanagoud Linganagoud	17,872	34.63%	▼18.14
Independent	Patil Basana Gouda Hanamantgouda	2,945	5.71%	New
Independent	Mathapathi Basavaraj Rudrayya	478	0.93%	New
Margin of victory		12,448	24.12%	▲15.69
Turnout		53,633	66.76%	▼2.93
Total valid votes		51,615		
Rejected ballots		2,018	3.76%	▲0.44
Registered electors		80,336		▲6.52
INC gain from JP		Swing	▲5.97	

=== Assembly Election 1978 ===
1978 Karnataka Legislative Assembly election : Huvina Hippargi
Party	Candidate	Votes	%	±%
JP	Patil Basangouda Somanagouda	26,814	52.77%	New
INC(I)	Patil Kumaragouda Adiveppagouda	22,531	44.34%	New
INC	Patil Shankaragouda Dandappagouda	1,472	2.90%	▼37.76
Margin of victory		4,283	8.43%	▼8.89
Turnout		52,563	69.69%	▲4.33
Total valid votes		50,817		
Rejected ballots		1,746	3.32%	▲3.32
Registered electors		75,419		▲50.23
JP gain from INC(O)		Swing	▼5.20	

=== Assembly Election 1972 ===
1972 Mysore State Legislative Assembly election : Huvina Hippargi
Party	Candidate	Votes	%	±%
INC(O)	K. D. Patil	18,331	57.97%	New
INC	L. R. Naik	12,855	40.66%	▼27.64
ABJS	Ganakumar Basayyaeerayya	433	1.37%	New
Margin of victory		5,476	17.32%	▼19.28
Turnout		32,810	65.36%	▲10.99
Total valid votes		31,619		
Registered electors		50,201		▲13.19
INC(O) gain from INC		Swing	▼10.33	

=== Assembly Election 1967 ===
1967 Mysore State Legislative Assembly election : Huvina Hippargi
Party	Candidate	Votes	%	±%
INC	P. G. Ninganagounda	15,189	68.30%	New
SWA	H. K. Martandappa	7,050	31.70%	New
Margin of victory		8,139	36.60%	
Turnout		24,114	54.37%	
Total valid votes		22,239		
Registered electors		44,353		
INC win (new seat)				

== See also ==
- List of constituencies of the Karnataka Legislative Assembly
