= Dodda Thimmaiah =

Indian politician

Member of Parliament, Lok Sabha
- In office 1952–1967
- Succeeded by: G.Y. Krishnan
- Constituency: Kolar, Karnataka

Member of Mysore Legislative Assembly
- In office 1967–1972
- Preceded by: Constituency did not exist
- Succeeded by: G. Bovi
- Constituency: Gulur

Personal details
- Born: 16 April 1920 Hosapalaya, Tumkur District, British India
- Party: Indian National Congress
- Spouse: Govindamma (1952)
- Children: 1 son 1 daughter
- Parent: Shri Thimmaiah (father)
- Education: B.A., B.L.
- Alma mater: Government Central High School, Government Intermediate College, Bangalore, Maharaja's College, Mysore and Government Law College, Bangalore

Dodda Thimmaiah is an Indian politician. He was elected to the lower House of the Indian Parliament, the Lok Sabha, from the Kolar as a member of the Indian National Congress.

== Early life and background ==
Dodda Thimmaiah was born on 16 April 1920 in Hosapalaya of Tumkur District. Shri Thimmaiah was his father.

Dodda Thimmaiah completed his education in B.A., and B.L. from Government Central High School, Government Intermediate College, Bangalore, Maharaja's College, Mysore and Government Law College, Bangalore.

== Personal life ==
Thimmaiah married Govindamma in 1952. The couple has 1 son and 1 daughter.

== Political career ==
In 1942, Dodda Thimmaiah started working as a Congress party worker and started actively participating in the 1942 Movement. He was imprisoned and suspended from education for 2 years in B.A. Class. Later in 1947, He was again imprisoned for actively participating in the struggle for responsible Govt in Mysore.

After Independence of India Thimmaiah represented kolar in Lok Sabha (the Lower House of the Indian Parliament) for 2 times from (1952 to 1957) and (1957 to 1962).

== Position held ==
#	From	To	Position
1.			President of State Literary Association
2.	1946		Secretary of Maharaja's College Union
3.	1948		Secretary of Law College Union
4.			Member of the Food Council Development Committee; Member of Working Committee - Mysore State Adijambava Sangh, Bangalore; Member of District Rural Development Committee, Shimoga; Member of District Food Council, Shimoga; President of Harijanabhivridhi Sangh, Shimoga
5.	1952	1957	MP (1st term) in 1st Lok Sabha from Kolar
6.	1957	1962	MP (2nd term) in 2nd Lok Sabha from Kolar: Parliamentary Secretary attached to the Minister of Mines and Fuel
7.	1962	1967	Member of Mysore Legislative Assembly from Gulur
