= M. S. Krishnan (politician) =

Indian politician

M. S. Krishnan, or MSK, was an Indian trade unionist and leader of Communist Party of India. MSK became involved in student movement, and would leave his studies unfinished to become a full-time labour organizer in Bangalore. He was jailed on a number of occasions. He donated all property he had inherited to the Communist Party. MSK was elected to the Karnataka Legislative Assembly four times as a CPI candidate (1967, 1972, 1978, 1983) - twice from the Malleswaram constituency and twice from the Rajajinagar constituency. As of the late 1970s he was the publisher of the Kannada-language monthly Aruna.

As of the mid-1980s he served as the Secretary of the CPI Karnataka State Council.

He served as President of the All India Trade Union Congress 1990–1995. MSK was active in organizing public sector unions in Bangalore, and took active part in the Joint Action Front as a measure to mobilize public sector workers.

MSK died on September 5, 2000.
