= T. R. Shamanna =

Member of Parliament (Lok Sabha) for Bangalore South
- In office 1980–1984
- Prime Minister: Indira Gandhi

Member of Mysore Legislative Assembly
- In office 1967–1978
- Preceded by: Constituency did not exist
- Succeeded by: Constituency did not exist
- Constituency: Fort

Member of the Karnataka Legislative Council
- In office 1988–1985

Personal details
- Born: 13 March 1912 Tirumale, Magadi Ramanagara district
- Died: 30 August 1990 (aged 78) Bangalore
- Party: Janata Party
- Spouse: Late Muthulakshmi
- Children: 7
- Profession: Chartered Accountant; educationist; social worker; politician

Tirumale Ranganatha Shamanna (13 March 1912 – 30 August 1990) was an Indian politician, social activist educationist, and independence movement activist from the state of Karnataka. He served as member of Parliament 7th Lok Sabha for Bangalore South from 1980 to 1984.

== Career ==
Shamanna started his career as a corporator to the Bangalore city corporation, now called Bruhat Bengaluru Mahanagara Palike in 1957 then also represented as Member to the Karnataka Legislative Assembly four times. Throughout the political career, he represented the same party from where he had the initial stint. In 1980, he was the only non-ruling Janata party candidate to win the elections to the parliament.

== Public service ==
Shamanna was known for his simplicity and simple living; he was revered as Karnataka Gandhi. He used his own three-wheeled vehicle for all public and private work. Remembered as the father of the city council, he led a movement to abolish cycle tax and water cess and reduce the burden of property tax that earned him the name Cycle Shamanna in the general public. In the early 1950s, Bengaluru witnessed severe water and power shortages. Shamanna led a representation to the central government to get the required quantity of water and electricity supplied to the citizens of the city.

== Entrepreneur ==
Shamanna started Shri Ranganatha Institute of Commerce in 1938 to provide typing and stenography (shorthand) skills to the emerging working population of South Bangalore. Realizing the growing need of Bengaluru city, Shamanna initiated formation of new layouts for residential purposes of citizens. In 1975, Shamanna co-founded the National Co-operative Bank, which is now one of the largest co-operative banks in Karnataka. He was instrumental in mobilizing initial share capital and getting the society registered as a bank by getting the Reserve Bank of India license within a short period.

== Educational Institutions ==
Shamanna was instrumental directly or indirectly in setting up educational institutions in Bengaluru. He was the trustee of the Achaya Patashala and Vijaya College. He also served as secretary, treasurer and finally as vice president of National College, Bangalore run by the National Education Society of Karnataka (NES). He also served as Chairman of Board of visitors of Victoria Hospital at Banalore Medical College. He assisted the set-up of B.M.S. College of Engineering by helping to procure the land for the proposed institution.

== Social service ==
As chairman of Central relief committee, beggar relief centers were set up in different parts of Karnataka. He ensured beggars and socially deprived segment of the population were treated with dignity. He was also responsible for setting up several social organizations for the welfare of women and underprivileged. Shamanna initiated and executed a transit accommodation for the patients and relatives visiting the government run Victoria Hospital (Bangalore Medical College). Similar effort was done at Kidwai Memorial Cancer Hospital.

== Recognition ==
Recognizing his yeoman service to the society, the park adjoining the Bugle Rock in Bengaluru has been named after him. As his social service centered on socially deprived population, one such locality in Bengaluru bears his name.
