= 2008 Karnataka Legislative Assembly election =

- 10–22 May 2008

All 224 Karnataka Legislative Assembly constituencies 113 seats needed for a majority
- Turnout: 64.68 pp (▼0.47 pp)
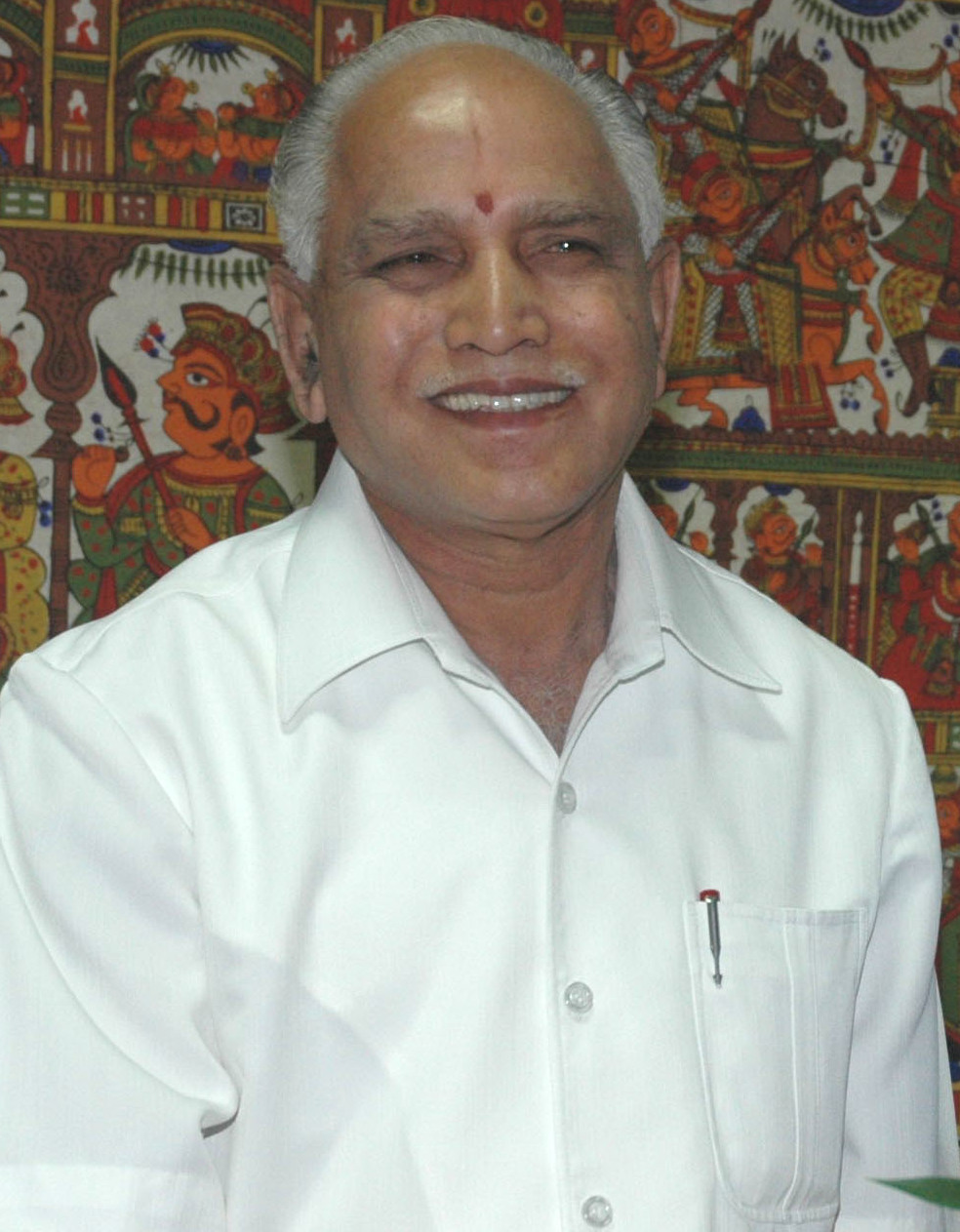

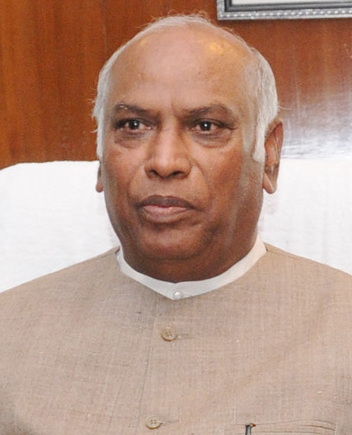

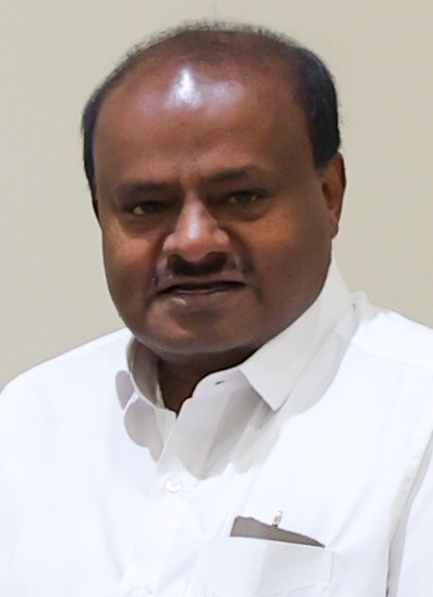
	Majority party	Minority party	Third party
Leader	B. S. Yeddyurappa	Mallikarjun Kharge	H. D. Kumaraswamy
Party	BJP	INC	JD(S)
Leader since	1984	2005	2006
Leader's seat	Shikaripura	Chittapur	Ramanagara
Last election	79	65	58
Seats won	110	80	28
Seat change	▲31	▲15	▼30
Popular vote	8,857,754	9,091,364	4,959,252
Percentage	33.86%	34.76%	18.96%
Swing	▲5.53 pp	▼0.51 pp	▼1.81 pp
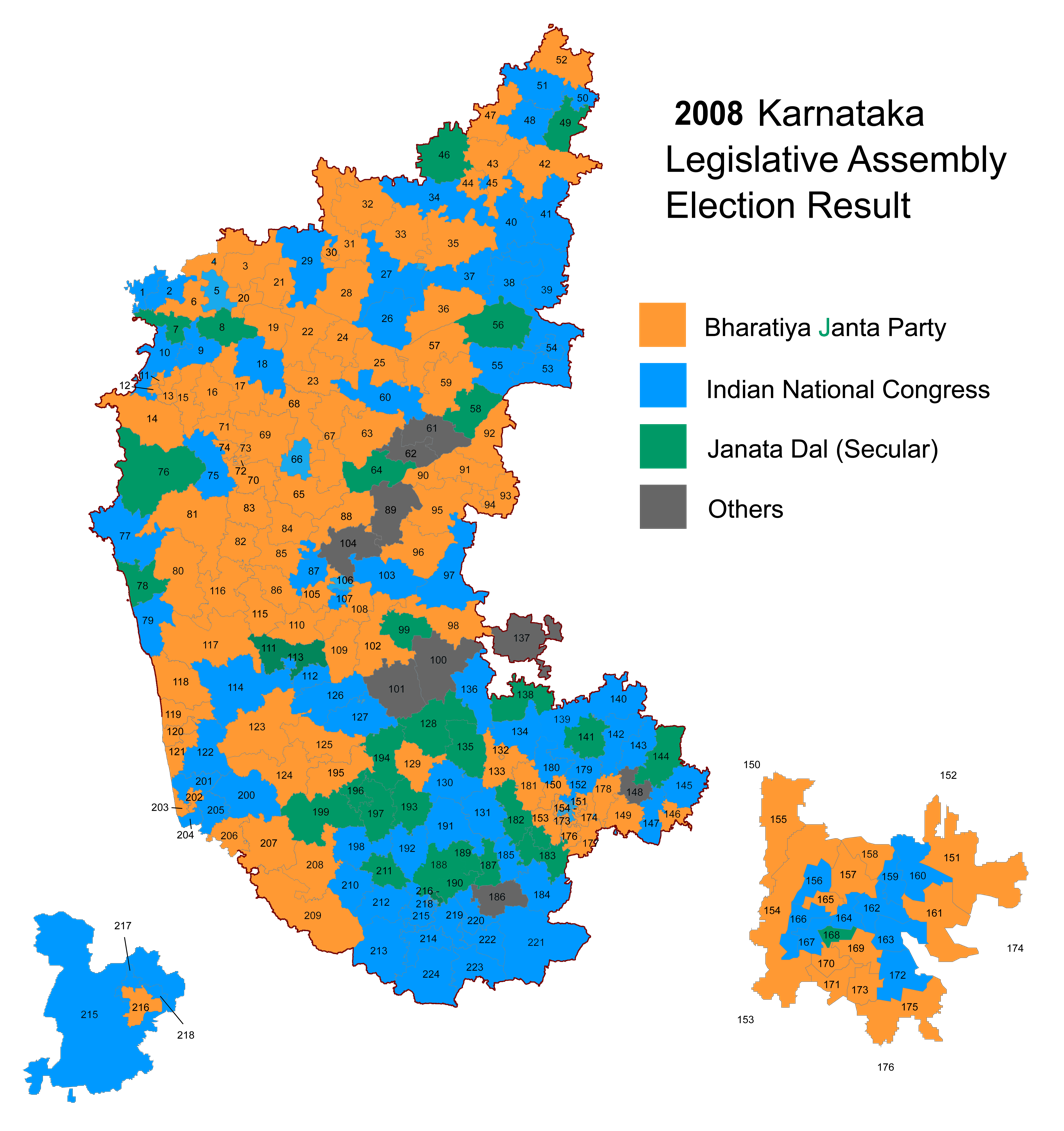
Chief Minister before election
President's rule
Elected Chief Minister
B. S. Yeddyurappa
BJP

The 2008 Karnataka Legislative Assembly election took place in three phases on 10, 16 and 22 May 2008 in all the 224 assembly constituencies in Karnataka, India. The elections were conducted to elect a government in the state of Karnataka for the next five years. The votes were counted on 25 May, and due to the use of electronic voting machines, all the results were out by the afternoon itself. The Bharatiya Janata Party emerged victorious winning 110 seats. Although the party fell short of a clear majority, it was able to form the government with the support of six independents. This was the first time BJP came to power on its own in Karnataka and any south Indian state.

== Background ==
In the 2004 Karnataka elections, the BJP emerged as the single largest party winning 79 out of the 224 seats. However, the Indian National Congress with 65 members and the Janata Dal (Secular) with 58 members formed a coalition government with Dharam Singh of the Congress as Chief minister. However, in early 2006, the JD(S) withdrew its support to the government and instead formed an alliance with the BJP and H. D. Kumaraswamy of the JD(S) became chief minister. The arrangement was based on an agreement that Kumaraswamy would be the chief minister for the first 20 months and B.S. Yeddyurappa of the BJP would be chief minister for the next 20 months.

The alliance between the BJP and the JD(S) collapsed in October 2007 after Kumaraswamy refused to let Yeddyurappa take over as chief minister as had been agreed upon in 2006. They briefly got together and formed a short-lived government headed by Yeddyurappa in November 2007, but it quickly collapsed due to disagreements over power-sharing. As a result, the state came under the president's rule and new elections were called for.

== Schedule ==
Schedule by districts

Schedule by seats

The Election Commission of India announced that polling would be held in a three phases on 10th, 16th and 22 May, and that results would be declared on 25 May.

It also declared that the provisions of the Model Code of Conduct "came into force with immediate effect" with the said announcement.

Event	Date		
Event	Phase-I	Phase-II	Phase-III
No. of assembly constituencies	89	66	69
Date for nominations	16 April 2008	22 April 2008	26 April 2008
Last date for filing nominations	22 April 2008	29 April 2008	3 May 2008
Date for scrutiny of nominations	24 April 2008	30 April 2008	5 May 2008
Last date for withdrawal of candidatures	26 April 2008	2 May 2008	7 May 2008
Date of poll	10 May 2008	16 May 2008	22 May 2008
Hours of poll	7:00 AM to 5:00 PM		
Date of counting	25 May 2008		
Date before which the election shall be completed	28 May 2008		

== Parties and alliances ==
=== National Democratic Alliance ===
Party	Flag	Symbol	Leader	Contesting seats
Bharatiya Janata Party			B. S. Yediyurappa	224

=== United Progressive Alliance ===
Party	Flag	Symbol	Leader	Contesting seats
Indian National Congress			Mallikarjun Kharge	222

=== Janata Dal (Secular) ===
Party	Flag	Symbol	Leader	Contesting seats
Janata Dal (Secular)			H. D. Kumaraswamy	219

== Campaign ==
The state was the first in India to vote after the electoral constituencies had been redrawn based on new population data. The BJP campaigned on the high rate of inflation and criticized the national United Progressive Alliance government for being soft on terrorism. The party called on the voters to give the party a chance in Karnataka.

The main election plank of the party was the betrayal of the JD(S) and the good budgets presented by Yeddyurappa when he was finance minister in the coalition government. The Congress party pledged to reign in prices, improve the infrastructure of the state, and provide a stable government.

== Results ==
Vote share by party
1. Indian National Congress (34.8%)
2. Bharatiya Janata Party (33.9%)
3. Janata Dal (Secular) (19.0%)
4. Independent (6.92%)
5. Other (5.50%)
Seat share by party
1. Bharatiya Janata Party (49.1%)
2. Indian National Congress (35.7%)
3. Janata Dal (Secular) (12.5%)
4. Independent (2.68%)

Parties and coalitions	Popular vote			Seats	
Parties and coalitions	Votes	%	±pp	Won	+/−
Bharatiya Janata Party (BJP)	88,57,754	33.86	▲5.53	110	▲31
Indian National Congress (INC)	90,91,364	34.76	▼0.51	80	▲15
Janata Dal (Secular) (JDS)	49,59,252	18.96	▼1.81	28	▼30
Janata Dal (United) (JDU)	86,735	0.33	▼1.73	0	▼5
Independents (IND)	18,10,525	6.92	▲0.06	6	▼7
Others	13,50,675	5.17	▼1.54	0	▼4
Total	2,61,56,305	100.00		224	±0
Valid votes	2,61,56,305	99.94			
Invalid votes	15,812	0.06			
Votes cast / turnout	2,61,72,117	64.87			
Abstentions	1,41,47,825	35.14			
Registered voters	4,03,19,942				

=== District wise results ===
District	Seats				
District	Seats	BJP	INC	JDS	IND
Belagavi	18	9	7	2	—N/a
Bijapur	8	5	3	—N/a	—N/a
Kalaburagi	12	5	6	1	—N/a
Bidar	6	2	3	1	—N/a
Raichur	7	2	3	2	—N/a
Koppal	5	2	1	1	1
Gadag	4	4	—N/a	—N/a	—N/a
Dharwad	7	6	1	—N/a	—N/a
Uttara Kannada	6	2	2	2	—N/a
Haveri	6	5	1	—N/a	—N/a
Ballari	9	8	1	—N/a	—N/a
Chitradurga	6	2	1	1	2
Davanagere	8	6	2	—N/a	—N/a
Shivamogga	7	5	2	—N/a	—N/a
Udupi	5	4	1	—N/a	—N/a
Chikkamagaluru	5	4	1	—N/a	—N/a
Dakshina Kannada	8	4	4	—N/a	—N/a
Tumakuru	11	3	4	3	1
Chikkaballapur	5	—N/a	4	1	—N/a
Kolar	6	2	2	1	1
Bengaluru Urban	28	17	10	1	—N/a
Bengaluru Rural	4	2	2	—N/a	—N/a
Ramanagara	4	—N/a	2	2	—N/a
Mandya	7	—N/a	2	4	1
Hassan	7	—N/a	2	5	—N/a
Kodagu	2	2	—N/a	—N/a	—N/a
Mysuru	11	2	8	1	—N/a
Chamarajanagar	4	—N/a	4	—N/a	—N/a
Total	224	110	80	28	6

=== Results by constituency ===
District	Constituency		Winner				Runner up				Margin	%
District	#	Name	Candidate	Party	Votes	%	Candidate	Party	Votes	%	Margin	%
Belagavi	1	Nippani	Kakaso Pandurang Patil	INC	46,070	35.73	Shashikala Annasaheb Jolle	BJP	38,583	29.92	7,487	5.81
Belagavi	2	Chikkodi-Sadalga	Prakash Hukkeri	INC	68,575	54.83	Ramesh Jigajinagi	BJP	44,505	35.58	24,070	19.25
Belagavi	3	Athani	Laxman Savadi	BJP	56,847	45.91	Kirana Kumar Patil	INC	35,179	28.41	21,668	17.50
Belagavi	4	Kagwad	Raju Kage	BJP	45,286	41.95	Digvijaya Pawar Desai	INC	36,304	33.63	8,982	8.32
Belagavi	5	Kudachi (SC)	Ghatage Shama Bhima	INC	29,481	31.69	Mahendra K. Tammannavar	BJP	28,715	30.87	766	0.82
Belagavi	6	Raibag (SC)	Duryodhan Aihole	BJP	39,378	40.69	Omprakash S. Kanagali	INC	24,818	25.65	14,560	15.04
Belagavi	7	Hukkeri	Umesh Katti	JD(S)	63,328	50.20	Appayyagouda Patil	INC	45,692	36.22	17,636	13.98
Belagavi	8	Arabhavi	Balachandra Jarkiholi	JD(S)	53,206	41.81	Vivekrao Vasanthrao Patil	BJP	47,838	37.59	5,368	4.22
Belagavi	9	Gokak	Ramesh Jarkiholi	INC	44,989	36.10	Ashok Ningayya Pujari	JD(S)	37,229	29.87	7,760	6.23
Belagavi	10	Yamkanamardi (ST)	Satish Jarkiholi	INC	46,132	42.47	Balagouda Patil	JD(S)	29,351	27.02	16,781	15.45
Belagavi	11	Belgaum Uttar	Fairoz Nuruddin Saith	INC	37,527	33.93	Shankargouda I. Patil	BJP	34,154	30.88	3,373	3.05
Belagavi	12	Belgaum Dakshin	Abhay Patil	BJP	45,713	39.96	Kiran Krishnarao Sayanak	IND	32,723	28.61	12,990	11.35
Belagavi	13	Belgaum Rural	Sanjay Patil	BJP	42,208	31.73	Shivaputrappa Malagi	INC	33,899	25.49	8,309	6.24
Belagavi	14	Khanapur	Pralhad Remani	BJP	36,288	31.71	Rafique Khatalsab Khanapuri	INC	24,634	21.52	11,654	10.19
Belagavi	15	Kittur	Suresh Marihal	BJP	48,581	43.48	D. B. Inamdar	INC	44,216	39.58	4,365	3.90
Belagavi	16	Bailhongal	Jagdish Metgud	BJP	48,988	46.85	Mahantesh Koujalagi	INC	39,748	38.01	9,240	8.84
Belagavi	17	Saundatti Yellamma	Anand Mamani	BJP	48,255	44.21	Koujalagi Subhash Shidramappa	INC	43,678	40.02	4,577	4.19
Belagavi	18	Ramdurg	Ashok Pattan	INC	49,246	45.29	Mahadevappa Yadawad	BJP	48,862	44.94	384	0.35
Bagalkot	19	Mudhol (SC)	Govind Karjol	BJP	51,835	48.31	R. B. Timmapur	INC	44,457	41.43	7,378	6.88
Bagalkot	20	Terdal	Siddu Savadi	BJP	62,595	50.30	Umashree	INC	50,351	40.46	12,244	9.84
Bagalkot	21	Jamkhandi	Kulkarni Shrikanth Subbrao	BJP	59,930	54.86	Siddu Nyamagouda	INC	40,240	36.83	19,690	18.03
Bagalkot	22	Bilgi	Murugesh Nirani	BJP	53,474	43.32	Ajaykumar Saranayak	INC	50,350	40.79	3,124	2.53
Bagalkot	23	Badami	Mahagundappa K. Pattanshetty	BJP	53,409	44.85	B. B. Chimmanakatti	INC	48,302	40.56	5,107	4.29
Bagalkot	24	Bagalkot	Veeranna Charantimath	BJP	46,452	42.02	H. Y. Meti	INC	37,206	33.66	9,246	8.36
Bagalkot	25	Hungund	Doddanagowda Patil	BJP	53,644	47.74	Vijayanand Kashappanavar	INC	48,575	43.23	5,069	4.51
Vijayapura	26	Muddebihal	C. S. Nadagouda	INC	24,065	24.97	Biradar Mangala Shantagoudru	BJP	21,662	22.48	2,403	2.49
Vijayapura	27	Devar Hippargi	A. S. Patil	INC	54,879	54.22	Basangouda Patil Yatnal	BJP	23,986	23.70	30,893	30.52
Vijayapura	28	Basavana Bagevadi	Bellubbi S. Kallappa	BJP	48,481	46.53	Shivanand Patil	INC	34,594	33.20	13,887	13.33
Vijayapura	29	Babaleshwar	M. B. Patil	INC	55,525	50.90	Vijugouda Patil	JD(S)	38,886	35.65	16,639	15.25
Vijayapura	30	Bijapur City	Appu Pattanshetty	BJP	34,217	41.45	Horti Sahebmoddin Abdularahiman	INC	16,653	20.17	17,564	21.28
Vijayapura	31	Nagthan (SC)	Katakadond Vittal Dondiba	BJP	40,225	37.66	H. R. Algur (Raju)	INC	36,018	33.72	4,207	3.94
Vijayapura	32	Indi	Bagali S. Satagouda	BJP	29,456	27.95	Yashvatraygouda V. Patil	INC	28,885	27.41	571	0.54
Vijayapura	33	Sindagi	Bhusanur Balappa	BJP	35,227	33.93	Managuli M. Chanveerappa	JD(S)	20,466	19.71	14,761	14.22
Kalaburagi	34	Afzalpur	Malikayya Guttedar	INC	50,082	47.83	M. Y. Patil	BJP	42,216	40.32	7,866	7.51
Kalaburagi	35	Jewargi	Doddappagouda S. Patil Naribol	BJP	46,531	40.28	Dharam Singh	INC	46,461	40.22	70	0.06
Yadgir	36	Shorapur (ST)	Narasimha Nayak	BJP	60,542	47.37	Raja Venkatappa Naik	INC	55,961	43.79	4,581	3.58
Yadgir	37	Shahapur	Sharanabasappa Darshanapur	INC	47,343	46.71	Shivshekharappagouda Shirwal	JD(S)	36,207	35.72	11,136	10.99
Yadgir	38	Yadgir	Dr. Maalakareddy	INC	36,348	39.02	Dr. Veerabaswanth Reddy	BJP	31,812	34.15	4,536	4.87
Yadgir	39	Gurumitkal	Baburao Chinchansur	INC	35,721	35.84	Nagan Gouda Kandakur	JD(S)	26,513	26.60	9,208	9.24
Kalaburagi	40	Chittapur (SC)	Mallikarjun Kharge	INC	49,837	52.13	Valmiki Kamalu Nayak	BJP	32,395	33.89	17,442	18.24
Kalaburagi	41	Sedam	Sharan Prakash Patil	INC	41,686	37.23	Rajkumar Patil Telkur	BJP	35,762	31.94	5,924	5.29
Kalaburagi	42	Chincholi (SC)	Sunil Vallyapur	BJP	35,491	42.10	Baburao Chauhan	INC	28,580	33.90	6,911	8.20
Kalaburagi	43	Gulbarga Rural (SC)	Revu Naik Belamgi	BJP	41,239	38.73	Chandrika Parameshwar	INC	24,116	22.65	17,123	16.08
Kalaburagi	44	Gulbarga Dakshin	Dattatraya Revoor	BJP	45,380	46.01	Basawaraj Bhimalli	INC	31,090	31.52	14,290	14.49
Kalaburagi	45	Gulbarga Uttar	Qamarul Islam	INC	54,123	54.26	B. G. Patil	BJP	39,168	39.27	14,955	14.99
Kalaburagi	46	Aland	Subhash Guttedar	JD(S)	42,425	37.51	B. R. Patil	INC	36,594	32.35	5,831	5.16
Bidar	47	Basavakalyan	Basavaraj Patil Attur	BJP	39,015	36.49	M. G. Muley	INC	31,077	29.07	7,938	7.42
Bidar	48	Homnabad	Rajashekar Baswaraj Patil	INC	49,603	42.97	Subhash Kallur	BJP	27,867	24.14	21,736	18.83
Bidar	49	Bidar South	Bandeppa Khashempur	JD(S)	32,054	32.93	Sanjay Kheny	BJP	30,783	31.63	1,271	1.30
Bidar	50	Bidar	Gurupadappa Nagmarpally	INC	33,557	37.83	Raheem Khan	BSP	30,627	34.53	2,930	3.30
Bidar	51	Bhalki	Eshwara Khandre	INC	64,492	50.01	Prakash Khandre	BJP	43,521	33.75	20,971	16.26
Bidar	52	Aurad (SC)	Prabhu Chavhan	BJP	56,964	55.61	Narsingrao Suryawanshi	INC	29,186	28.49	27,778	27.12
Raichur	53	Raichur Rural (ST)	Raja Rayappa Naik	INC	34,432	32.92	Raja Rangappa Naik	JD(S)	32,555	31.13	1,877	1.79
Raichur	54	Raichur	Syed Yasin	INC	28,801	35.69	M. Earanna	JD(S)	20,440	25.33	8,361	10.36
Raichur	55	Manvi (ST)	G. Hampayya Nayak	INC	38,290	35.86	Gangadhar Nayak	BJP	35,771	33.50	2,519	2.36
Raichur	56	Devadurga (ST)	K. Shivana Gouda Naik	JD(S)	37,226	41.82	A. Venkatesh Naik	INC	32,639	36.67	4,587	5.15
Raichur	57	Lingsugur (SC)	Manappa Vajjal	BJP	51,017	53.29	A. Vasanthkumar	INC	31,837	33.25	19,180	20.04
Raichur	58	Sindhanur	Nadagouda Venkatarao	JD(S)	53,621	47.40	Badarli Hampanagouda	INC	38,747	34.25	14,874	13.15
Raichur	59	Maski (ST)	Pratap Gouda Patil	BJP	35,711	42.26	Timmappa	INC	28,068	33.21	7,643	9.05
Koppal	60	Kushtagi	Amaregouda Bayyapur	INC	33,699	32.70	K Sharanappa Vakeelaru	JD(S)	31,929	30.98	1,770	1.72
Koppal	61	Kanakagiri (SC)	Shivaraj Tangadagi	IND	32,743	33.88	Bhavanimath Mukundarao	INC	30,560	31.62	2,183	2.26
Koppal	62	Gangawati	Paranna Munavalli	BJP	37,121	37.37	Iqbal Ansari	JD(S)	34,236	34.47	2,885	2.90
Koppal	63	Yelburga	Eshanna Gulagannavar	BJP	59,562	56.21	Basavaraj Rayaraddi	INC	29,781	28.10	29,781	28.11
Koppal	64	Koppal	Karadi Sanganna Amarappa	JD(S)	48,372	40.57	K. Basavaraj Bheemappa Hitnal	INC	38,027	31.89	10,345	8.68
Gadag	65	Shirahatti (SC)	Ramanna S Lamani	BJP	39,859	38.41	H R Nayak	INC	29,358	28.29	10,501	10.12
Gadag	66	Gadag	Srishilappa Bidarur	BJP	54,414	50.61	H K Patil	INC	45,798	42.59	8,616	8.02
Gadag	67	Ron	Kalakappa Bandi	BJP	50,145	42.01	Gurupadagouda Patil	INC	48,315	40.47	1,830	1.54
Gadag	68	Nargund	C. C. Patil	BJP	46,824	43.38	B. R. Yavagal	IND	29,210	27.06	17,614	16.32
Dharwad	69	Navalgund	Shankar Patil Munenakoppa	BJP	49,436	40.93	Gaddi Kallappa Nagappa	INC	32,541	26.94	16,895	13.99
Dharwad	70	Kundgol	Siddangouda Chikkangoudra	BJP	43,307	39.03	C. S. Shivalli	INC	36,931	33.28	6,376	5.75
Dharwad	71	Dharwad	Seema Ashok Masuti	BJP	35,417	31.75	Vinay Kulkarni	INC	34,694	31.10	723	0.65
Dharwad	72	Hubli-Dharwad-East (SC)	Veerabhadrappa Halaharavi	BJP	41,029	44.36	F. H. Jakkappanavar	INC	28,861	31.20	12,168	13.16
Dharwad	73	Hubli-Dharwad-Central	Jagadish Shettar	BJP	58,747	54.75	Munavalli Shankranna Ishwarappa	INC	32,738	30.51	26,009	24.24
Dharwad	74	Hubli-Dharwad-West	Chandrakant Bellad	BJP	60,800	55.97	Honnalli Jabbarkhan Hayatakhan	INC	27,453	25.27	33,347	30.70
Dharwad	75	Kalghatgi	Santosh S. Lad	INC	49,733	43.47	Channappa Nimbannavar	BJP	38,091	33.30	11,642	10.17
Uttara Kannada	76	Haliyal	Sunil V. Hegde	JD(S)	46,031	46.31	Deshpande Raghunath V.	INC	40,606	40.85	5,425	5.46
Uttara Kannada	77	Karwar	Asnotikar Anand Vasant	INC	47,477	40.86	Ganapati Dumma Ulvekar	IND	27,768	23.90	19,709	16.96
Uttara Kannada	78	Kumta	Dinakar Keshav Shetty	JD(S)	30,792	28.76	Mohan Krishna Shetty	INC	30,772	28.74	20	0.02
Uttara Kannada	79	Bhatkal	J D Naik	INC	49,079	44.72	Naik Shivananda Narayana	BJP	36,913	33.64	12,166	11.08
Uttara Kannada	80	Sirsi	Vishweshwar Kageri	BJP	53,438	45.40	Naik Raveendranath Narayan	INC	22,705	19.29	30,733	26.11
Uttara Kannada	81	Yellapur	V S Patil	BJP	39,109	37.46	Arbail Hebbar Shivram	INC	36,624	35.08	2,485	2.38
Haveri	82	Hangal	C. M. Udasi	BJP	60,025	48.70	Manohar Tasildar	INC	54,103	43.90	5,922	4.80
Haveri	83	Shiggaon	Basavaraj Bommai	BJP	63,780	51.76	Syed Khadri	INC	50,918	41.32	12,862	10.44
Haveri	84	Haveri (SC)	Neharu Olekar	BJP	41,068	36.17	Rudrappa Lamani	IND	23,002	20.26	18,066	15.91
Haveri	85	Byadgi	Sureshagoudra Patil	BJP	59,642	49.52	Basavaraj Shivannanavar	INC	48,238	40.05	11,404	9.47
Haveri	86	Hirekerur	B.C. Patil	INC	35,322	30.97	U.B. Banakar	IND	31,132	27.29	4,190	3.68
Haveri	87	Ranibennur	G. Shivanna	BJP	59,399	47.29	K.B. Koliwad	INC	56,667	45.12	2,732	2.17
Vijayanagara	88	Hadagalli (SC)	B. Chandra Naik	BJP	43,992	48.27	P.T. Parameswara Naik	INC	37,474	41.12	6,518	7.15
Vijayanagara	89	Hagaribommanahalli (SC)	K. Nemaraj Naik	BJP	51,156	44.85	L.B. P. Bheema Naik	JD(S)	23,865	20.92	27,291	23.93
Vijayanagara	90	Vijayanagara	Anand Singh	BJP	52,418	48.49	H.R. Gaviappa	INC	25,921	23.98	26,497	24.51
Ballary	91	Kampli (ST)	T.H. Suresh Babu	BJP	61,388	50.96	Sanna Hanumakka	INC	39,052	32.42	22,336	18.54
Ballary	92	Siruguppa (ST)	Somalingappa M.S.	BJP	43,359	37.70	Nagaraj B.M.	INC	38,535	33.50	4,824	4.20
Ballary	93	Bellary (ST)	B. Sreeramulu	BJP	61,991	56.23	B. Ramprasad	INC	36,275	32.91	25,716	23.32
Ballary	94	Bellary City	Gali Somashekar Reddy	BJP	54,831	47.42	Anil H. Lad	INC	53,809	46.54	1,022	0.88
Ballary	95	Sandur (ST)	E. Tukaram	INC	49,535	46.63	T. Nagaraj	BJP	28,816	27.12	20,719	19.51
Vijayanagara	96	Kudligi (ST)	B. Nagendra	BJP	54,443	48.52	S. Venkatesh	INC	45,686	40.72	8,757	7.80
Chitradurga	97	Molakalmuru (ST)	N.Y. Gopala Krishna	INC	51,402	37.11	S. Thippeswamy	BJP	46,326	33.45	5,076	3.66
Chitradurga	98	Challakere (ST)	Thippeswamy	BJP	42,591	36.01	Shashi Kumar	INC	42,302	35.77	289	0.24
Chitradurga	99	Chitradurga	Basavarajann (Basanna)	JD(S)	55,906	40.49	G.H. Thippareddy	INC	39,584	28.67	16,322	11.82
Chitradurga	100	Hiriyur	Sudhakar D.	IND	43,299	31.94	Lakshmikantha N.R.	BJP	26,921	19.86	16,378	12.08
Chitradurga	101	Hosadurga	Goolihatti D. Shekar	IND	41,798	33.92	B.G. Govindappa	INC	40,630	32.97	1,168	0.95
Chitradurga	102	Holalkere (SC)	M Chandrappa	BJP	54,322	40.66	H Anjaneya	INC	39,010	29.20	15,312	11.46
Devangere	103	Jagalur (ST)	S.V. Ramachandra	INC	38,574	36.79	H.P. Rajesh	BJP	35,763	34.11	2,811	2.68
Vijayanagara	104	Harapanahalli	G Karunakara Reddy	BJP	69,235	56.23	M P Prakash	INC	44,017	35.75	25,218	20.48
Devangere	105	Harihar	B.P. Harish	BJP	47,238	37.76	H. Shivappa	JD(S)	36,220	28.95	11,018	8.81
Devangere	106	Davanagere North	S.A. Ravindranath	BJP	75,798	72.12	B.M. Satish	JD(S)	21,888	20.83	53,910	51.29
Devangere	107	Davanagere South	Shamanuru Shivashankarappa	INC	41,675	41.50	Yashwanth Rao Jadav	BJP	35,317	35.17	6,358	6.33
Devangere	108	Mayakonda (SC)	M Basavaraja Naika	BJP	52,128	46.50	Dr Y Ramappa	INC	35,471	31.64	16,657	14.86
Devangere	109	Channagiri	K. Madal Virupakshappa	BJP	39,526	34.80	Vadnal Rajanna	INC	38,533	33.92	993	0.88
Devangere	110	Honnali	M. P. Renukacharya	BJP	62,283	48.43	D.G. Shanthanagowda	INC	55,897	43.46	6,386	4.97
Shimoga	111	Shimoga Rural (SC)	K.G. Kumaraswamy	BJP	56,979	45.38	Kariyanna	INC	32,714	26.05	24,265	19.33
Shimoga	112	Bhadravati	B.K. Sangameshwara	INC	53,257	42.50	Appaji M.J.	JD(S)	52,770	42.11	487	0.39
Shimoga	113	Shimoga	K.S. Eshwarappa	BJP	58,982	53.58	Ismail Khan	INC	26,563	24.13	32,419	29.45
Shimoga	114	Tirthahalli	Kimmane Rathnakar	INC	57,932	46.62	Araga Jnanendra	BJP	54,106	43.54	3,826	3.08
Shimoga	115	Shikaripura	B.S. Yeddyurappa	BJP	83,491	66.22	S. Bangarappa	SP	37,564	29.79	45,927	36.43
Shimoga	116	Sorab	H. Halappa	BJP	53,552	43.36	S. Kumara Bangarappa	INC	32,499	26.31	21,053	17.05
Shimoga	117	Sagar	Gopalkrishna Beluru	BJP	57,706	46.61	Kagodu Thimmappa	INC	54,861	44.32	2,845	2.29
Udupi	118	Byndoor	K. Laxminarayana	BJP	62,196	48.64	K. Gopala Poojary	INC	54,226	42.40	7,970	6.24
Udupi	119	Kundapura	Haladi Srinivas Shetty	BJP	71,695	57.49	K. Jayaprakash Hegde	INC	46,612	37.37	25,083	20.12
Udupi	120	Udupi	K. Raghupathy Bhat	BJP	58,920	50.02	Pramod Madhwaraj	INC	56,441	47.91	2,479	2.11
Udupi	121	Kapu	Lalaji R. Mendon	BJP	45,961	46.59	Vasantha V. Salian	INC	44,994	45.61	967	0.98
Udupi	122	Karkal	H. Gopal Bhandary	INC	56,529	50.69	V. Sunil Kumar	BJP	54,992	49.31	1,537	1.38
Chikmagalur	123	Sringeri	D.N. Jeevaraja	BJP	43,646	40.36	D.B. Chandre Gowda	INC	41,396	38.28	2,250	2.08
Chikmagalur	124	Mudigere (SC)	M.P. Kumara Swamy	BJP	34,579	34.64	B.N. Chandrappa	INC	26,084	26.13	8,495	8.51
Chikmagalur	125	Chikmagalur	C.T. Ravi	BJP	48,915	41.02	S.L. Bhojegowda	JD(S)	33,831	28.37	15,084	12.65
Chikmagalur	126	Tarikere	Suresh D.S.	BJP	52,167	47.38	T.V. Shivashankarappa	INC	33,748	30.65	18,419	16.73
Chikmagalur	127	Kadur	K.M. Krishnamurthy	INC	39,411	32.30	Y.S.V. Datta	JD(S)	36,000	29.51	3,411	2.79
Tumakuru	128	Chiknayakanhalli	C.B. Suresh Babu	JD(S)	67,046	46.69	K.S. Kiran Kumar	BJP	38,002	26.47	29,044	20.22
Tumakuru	129	Tiptur	B.C. Nagesh	BJP	46,034	37.91	K. Shadakshari	INC	39,168	32.25	6,866	5.66
Tumakuru	130	Turuvekere	Jaggesh	INC	47,849	37.49	M.D. Lakshminarayana	BJP	38,323	30.02	9,526	7.47
Tumakuru	131	Kunigal	B.B. Ramaswamy Gowda	INC	48,160	39.92	D. Krishna Kumar	BJP	34,366	28.48	13,794	11.44
Tumakuru	132	Tumkur City	S. Shivanna Sogadu	BJP	39,435	37.49	Rafiq Ahmed	INC	37,486	35.64	1,949	1.85
Tumakuru	133	Tumkur Rural	B. Suresh Gowda	BJP	60,904	50.08	H. Ningappa	JD(S)	32,512	26.73	28,392	23.35
Tumakuru	134	Koratagere (SC)	Dr. G. Parameswara	INC	49,276	38.65	Chandraiah	JD(S)	37,719	29.59	11,557	9.06
Tumakuru	135	Gubbi	S.R. Srinivas	JD(S)	52,302	42.11	C.V. Mahadevaiah	BJP	37,630	30.30	14,672	11.81
Tumakuru	136	Sira	T.B. Jayachandra	INC	60,793	45.02	B. Sathyanarayana	JD(S)	34,297	25.40	26,496	19.62
Tumakuru	137	Pavagada (SC)	Venkataramanappa	IND	43,562	33.60	K.M. Thimmarayappa	JD(S)	30,515	23.54	13,047	10.06
Tumakuru	138	Madhugiri	Gowri Shankar D.C.	JD(S)	51,971	42.01	Kyatasandra N. Rajanna	INC	51,408	41.55	563	0.46
Chikkaballapura	139	Gauribidanur	N.H. Shivashankar Reddy	INC	39,127	30.41	Ravinarayana Reddy N.M.	BJP	27,959	21.73	11,168	8.68
Chikkaballapura	140	Bagepalli	Sampangi N.	INC	32,244	25.86	G.V. Srirama Reddy	CPI(M)	31,306	25.10	938	0.76
Chikkaballapura	141	Chikkaballapur	K.P. Bachche Gowda	JD(S)	49,774	39.49	S.V. Ashwathanarayana Reddy	INC	26,473	21.01	23,301	18.48
Chikkaballapura	142	Sidlaghatta	V. Muniyappa	INC	65,939	49.95	M. Rajanna	JD(S)	59,437	45.02	6,502	4.93
Chikkaballapura	143	Chintamani	M.C. Sudhakar	INC	58,103	44.45	K.M. Krishna Reddy	JD(S)	56,857	43.50	1,246	0.95
Kolar	144	Srinivaspur	G.K. Venkata Shiva Reddy	JD(S)	70,282	47.58	K.R. Ramesh Kumar	INC	66,613	45.10	3,669	2.48
Kolar	145	Mulbagal (SC)	Amaresh	INC	31,280	27.42	N. Munianjappa	JD(S)	29,452	25.82	1,828	1.60
Kolar	146	Kolar Gold Field (SC)	Y. Sampangi	BJP	29,643	28.44	S. Rajendiran	RPI	26,323	25.26	3,320	3.18
Kolar	147	Bangarpet (SC)	Narayanaswamy M.	INC	49,556	44.89	Venkatamuniyappa B.P.	BJP	42,051	38.09	7,505	6.80
Kolar	148	Kolar	R. Varthur Prakash	IND	66,446	52.45	K. Srinivasagowda	INC	45,417	35.85	21,029	16.60
Kolar	149	Malur	Es.En. Krishnaiah Shetty	BJP	78,280	65.83	R. Prabhakar	JD(S)	25,879	21.76	52,401	44.07
Bangalore Urban	150	Yelahanka	S.R. Vishwanath	BJP	60,975	41.36	B. Chandrappa	INC	44,953	30.49	16,022	10.87
Bangalore Urban	151	K.R. Pura	N.S. Nandiesha Reddy	BJP	66,741	49.23	A. Krishnappa	INC	56,971	42.02	9,770	7.21
Bangalore Urban	152	Byatarayanapura	Krishna Byregowda	INC	60,979	43.01	A. Ravi	BJP	51,627	36.41	9,352	6.60
Bangalore Urban	153	Yeshvanthapura	Shobha Karandlaje	BJP	57,643	38.29	S.T. Somashekar	INC	56,561	37.57	1,082	0.72
Bangalore Urban	154	Rajarajeshwarinagar	M. Srinivas	BJP	60,187	41.82	P.N. Krishnamurthy	INC	40,595	28.21	19,592	13.61
Bangalore Urban	155	Dasarahalli	S. Muniraju	BJP	59,004	46.30	K.C. Ashoka	INC	36,849	28.91	22,155	17.39
Bangalore Urban	156	Mahalakshmi Layout	N.L. Narendra Babu	INC	42,652	37.62	R.V. Hareesh	BJP	39,427	34.77	3,225	2.85
Bangalore Urban	157	Malleshwaram	Dr. Aswath Narayan C.N.	BJP	53,794	52.13	M.R. Seetharam	INC	45,611	44.20	8,183	7.93
Bangalore Urban	158	Hebbal	Katta Subramanya Naidu	BJP	46,715	48.89	H.M. Revanna	INC	41,763	43.71	4,952	5.18
Bangalore Urban	159	Pulakeshinagar (SC)	B. Prasanna Kumar	INC	39,577	50.41	R. Srinivasa Murthy	JD(S)	21,908	27.90	17,669	22.51
Bangalore Urban	160	Sarvagnanagar	K.J. George	INC	45,488	42.14	R. Shankar	BJP	22,880	21.20	22,608	20.94
Bangalore Urban	161	C.V. Raman Nagar (SC)	S. Raghu	BJP	47,369	53.03	K.C. Vijayakumar	INC	30,714	34.38	16,655	18.65
Bangalore Urban	162	Shivajinagar	R. Rhoshan Baig	INC	43,013	53.53	Nirmal Surana	BJP	32,617	40.59	10,396	12.94
Bangalore Urban	163	Shanti Nagar	N.A. Haris	INC	42,423	52.35	D.U. Mallikarjuna	BJP	28,626	35.32	13,797	17.03
Bangalore Urban	164	Gandhi Nagar	Dinesh Gundu Rao	INC	41,188	41.01	P.C. Mohan	BJP	34,242	34.09	6,946	6.92
Bangalore Urban	165	Rajaji Nagar	Suresh Kumar S.	BJP	49,655	51.45	Padmavathi G.	INC	34,995	36.26	14,660	15.19
Bangalore Urban	166	Govindraj Nagar	V. Somanna	INC	53,297	51.01	R. Ravindra	BJP	28,935	27.69	24,362	23.32
Bangalore Urban	167	Vijay Nagar	M. Krishnappa	INC	70,457	64.43	Pramila Nesargi	BJP	31,832	29.11	38,625	35.32
Bangalore Urban	168	Chamrajpet	B.Z. Zameer Ahmed Khan	JD(S)	43,004	48.41	V.S. Shama Sundar	BJP	23,414	26.36	19,590	22.05
Bangalore Urban	169	Chickpet	Dr. Hemachandra Sagar	BJP	40,252	40.23	R.V. Devaraj	INC	32,971	32.95	7,281	7.28
Bangalore Urban	170	Basavanagudi	Ravisubramanya L.A.	BJP	50,294	52.21	K. Chandrashekar	INC	37,094	38.50	13,200	13.71
Bangalore Urban	171	Padmanaba Nagar	R. Ashoka	BJP	61,561	51.87	M.V. Prasad Babu	JD(S)	30,285	25.52	31,276	26.35
Bangalore Urban	172	B.T.M. Layout	Ramalinga Reddy	INC	46,811	46.26	G. Prasad Reddy	BJP	44,954	44.43	1,857	1.83
Bangalore Urban	173	Jayanagar	B.N. Vijaya Kumar	BJP	43,164	48.43	M. Suresh	INC	20,570	23.08	22,594	25.35
Bangalore Urban	174	Mahadevapura (SC)	Aravind Limbavali	BJP	76,376	52.16	B. Shivanna	INC	63,018	43.04	13,358	9.12
Bangalore Urban	175	Bommanahalli	Satish Reddy M.	BJP	62,993	51.89	Kupendra Reddy D.	INC	49,353	40.66	13,640	11.23
Bangalore Urban	176	Bangalore South	M. Krishnappa	BJP	71,114	42.57	Sadananda M.	INC	36,979	22.13	34,135	20.44
Bangalore Urban	177	Anekal (SC)	A. Narayanaswamy	BJP	62,455	44.82	B. Gopal	INC	52,593	37.74	9,862	7.08
Bangalore Rural	178	Hosakote	B.N. Bachhe Gowda	BJP	71,069	50.07	M.T.B. Nagaraju	INC	67,191	47.33	3,878	2.74
Bangalore Rural	179	Devanahalli (SC)	Venkataswamy	INC	57,181	43.19	G. Chandranna	JD(S)	50,559	38.19	6,622	5.00
Bangalore Rural	180	Doddaballapur	J. Narasimhaswamy	INC	51,724	41.32	C. Channigappa	JD(S)	47,970	38.33	3,754	2.99
Bangalore Rural	181	Nelamangala (SC)	M.V. Nagaraju	BJP	37,892	32.96	Anjanamurthy	INC	35,741	31.09	2,151	1.87
Ramanagara	182	Magadi	H.C. Balakrishna	JD(S)	75,991	52.75	P. Nagaraju	BJP	51,072	35.46	24,919	17.29
Ramanagara	183	Ramanagaram	H. D. Kumaraswamy	JD(S)	71,700	56.09	M. Rudresha	BJP	24,440	19.12	47,260	36.97
Ramanagara	184	Kanakapura	D.K. Shivakumar	INC	68,096	48.34	D.M. Vishwanath	JD(S)	60,917	43.24	7,179	5.10
Ramanagara	185	Channapatna	C.P. Yogeshwara	INC	69,356	48.31	M.C. Ashwath	JD(S)	64,426	44.88	4,930	3.43
Mandya	186	Malavalli (SC)	P.M. Narendraswamy	IND	45,288	31.40	Dr. K. Annadani	JD(S)	33,369	23.14	11,919	8.26
Mandya	187	Maddur	M.S. Siddaraju	JD(S)	49,954	36.85	D.C. Thammanna	INC	42,364	31.25	7,590	5.60
Mandya	188	Melukote	C.S. Puttaraju	JD(S)	66,626	47.80	K.S. Puttannaiah	SKP	54,681	39.23	11,945	8.57
Mandya	189	Mandya	M. Srinivas	JD(S)	47,265	36.39	Vidya Nagendra	BJP	36,736	28.29	10,529	8.10
Mandya	190	Shrirangapattana	Ramesha Bandisiddegowda	JD(S)	52,234	36.98	Ambaresh	INC	47,074	33.32	5,160	3.66
Mandya	191	Nagamangala	Suresh Gowda	INC	69,259	49.40	N. Chaluvarayaswamy	JD(S)	63,766	45.48	5,493	3.92
Mandya	192	Krishnarajpet	K.B. Chandrashekar	INC	48,556	35.72	Krishna	JD(S)	45,500	33.47	3,056	2.25
Hassan	193	Shravanabelagola	C.S. Putte Gowda	JD(S)	65,726	49.62	H.C. Shrikantaiah	INC	56,280	42.49	9,446	7.13
Hassan	194	Arsikere	K.M. Shivalingegowda	JD(S)	74,025	53.12	G.V. Siddappa	INC	39,799	28.56	34,226	24.56
Hassan	195	Belur	Rudresh Gowda Y.N.	INC	46,451	39.02	Shivarudrappa B.	BJP	28,630	24.05	17,821	14.97
Hassan	196	Hassan	H.S. Prakash	JD(S)	52,266	46.61	B. Shivaramu	INC	35,462	31.62	16,804	14.99
Hassan	197	Holenarasipur	H.D. Revanna	JD(S)	77,448	54.58	Anupama S.G.	INC	49,842	35.13	27,606	19.45
Hassan	198	Arkalgud	Manju A.	INC	68,257	46.96	A.T. Ramaswamy	JD(S)	59,217	40.74	9,040	6.22
Hassan	199	Sakleshpur (SC)	H.K. Kumaraswamy	JD(S)	49,768	39.44	Nirvanaiah	BJP	36,473	28.90	13,295	10.54
Dakshina Kannada	200	Belthangady	K. Vasantha Bangera	INC	59,528	46.13	K. Prabhakara Bangera	BJP	43,425	33.65	16,103	12.48
Dakshina Kannada	201	Moodabidri	K. Abhayachandra	INC	44,744	40.31	K. P. Jagadish Adhikari	BJP	34,841	31.39	9,903	8.92
Dakshina Kannada	202	Mangalore City North	J. Krishna Palemar	BJP	70,057	53.10	B. A. Mohiuddin Bava	INC	55,631	42.16	14,426	10.94
Dakshina Kannada	203	Mangalore City South	N. Yogish Bhat	BJP	60,133	50.52	Ivan D'Souza	INC	51,373	43.16	8,760	7.36
Dakshina Kannada	204	Mangalore	U. T. Khadar	INC	50,718	48.44	K. Padmanabha Kottary	BJP	43,669	41.71	7,049	6.73
Dakshina Kannada	205	Bantval	B. Ramanatha Rai	INC	61,560	45.52	Nagaraj Shetty B.	BJP	60,309	44.60	1,251	0.92
Dakshina Kannada	206	Puttur	Mallika Prasada	BJP	46,605	37.77	Bondala Jagannatha Shetty	INC	45,180	36.61	1,425	1.16
Dakshina Kannada	207	Sullia (SC)	Angara S.	BJP	61,144	49.41	Dr. B. Raghu	INC	56,822	45.91	4,322	3.50
Kodagu	208	Madikeri	Appachu (Ranjan)	BJP	60,084	47.06	B. A. Jeevijaya	INC	53,499	41.90	6,585	5.16
Kodagu	209	Virajpet	Bopaiah K. G.	BJP	48,605	41.78	Veena Achaiah	INC	33,532	28.82	15,073	12.96
Mysore	210	Piriyapatna	K. Venkatesh	INC	38,453	32.77	K. Mahadeva	JD(S)	37,574	32.02	879	0.75
Mysore	211	Krishnarajanagara	S. R. Mahesh	JD(S)	77,322	53.68	Adaguru H. Vishwanath	INC	56,774	39.41	20,548	14.27
Mysore	212	Hunsur	H. P. Manjunatha	INC	57,497	39.57	Chikkamadu S.	JD(S)	42,456	29.22	15,041	10.35
Mysore	213	Heggadadevanakote (ST)	Chikkanna	INC	43,222	34.48	K. Chikaveeranayaka	BJP	30,680	24.47	12,542	10.01
Mysore	214	Nanjangud (SC)	V. Srinivasa Prasad	INC	42,867	34.77	S. Mahadevaiah	BJP	42,159	34.19	708	0.58
Mysore	215	Chamundeshwari	M. Satyanarayana	INC	55,828	37.19	Manjegowda C. N.	BJP	41,529	27.67	14,299	9.52
Mysore	216	Krishnaraja	S. A. Ramadass	BJP	63,314	54.56	M. K. Somashekar	INC	43,892	37.82	19,422	16.74
Mysore	217	Chamaraja	H. S. Shankaralinge Gowda	BJP	44,243	41.94	Vasu	INC	34,844	33.03	9,399	8.91
Mysore	218	Narasimharaja	Tanveer Sait	INC	37,789	37.06	S. Nagaraju (Sandesh)	JD(S)	31,104	30.50	6,685	6.56
Mysore	219	Varuna	Siddaramaiah	INC	71,908	50.23	L. Revannasiddaiah	BJP	53,071	37.07	18,837	13.16
Mysore	220	T. Narasipur (SC)	H. C. Mahadevappa	INC	42,593	35.77	M. C. Sundareshan	JD(S)	28,869	24.24	13,724	11.53
Chamarajanagar	221	Hanur	R. Narendra	INC	59,523	47.30	Parimala Nagappa	BSP	36,383	28.91	23,140	18.39
Chamarajanagar	222	Kollegal (SC)	R. Dhruvanarayana	INC	37,384	28.72	S. Mahendar	BJP	25,586	19.66	11,798	9.06
Chamarajanagar	223	Chamarajanagar	C. Puttarangashetty	INC	42,017	33.93	M. Mahadev	BJP	39,405	31.82	2,612	2.11
Chamarajanagar	224	Gundlupet	H. S. Mahadeva	INC	64,824	45.15	C. S. Niranjan Kumar	BJP	62,621	43.62	2,203	1.53

Sources: Election Commission of India, Times of India, News 18, News Minute

== Aftermath ==
Although the BJP fell three seats short of getting an absolute majority, B. S. Yeddyurappa was able to become chief minister with the support of six independent members of the assembly. He was sworn in as chief minister on 30 May 2008 along with a 30 strong cabinet, which included five of the six independents who had agreed to back the BJP. Jagadish Shettar was elected speaker on 5 June and a vote of confidence was passed by voice vote on 6 June after the opposition walked out.
