= Mahadevappa Yadawad =

Indian politician

Member of the Karnataka Legislative Assembly
- In office 2018–2023
- Preceded by: Ashok Pattan
- Succeeded by: Ashok Pattan
- Constituency: Ramdurg

Personal details
- Party: Bhartiya Janta Party

Mahadevappa Shivalingappa Yadawad is an Indian politician. He was elected to the Karnataka Legislative Assembly from Ramdurg in the 2018 Karnataka Legislative Assembly election as a member of the Bharatiya Janata Party (BJP).

Bharatiya Janata Party denied BJP ticket to Mahadevappa Yadawad in the 2023 Karnataka Legislative Assembly election and he filed his candidature as BJP rebel and later withdrawn his nomination papers and supported congress candidate Jagadish Shettar.
