= N. H. Konaraddi =

Indian politician (born 1963)

Ningaraddi Hanamaraddi Konaraddi (born 1963) is an Indian politician from Karnataka. He is an MLA from Navalgund Assembly constituency in Dharwad district. He won the 2023 Karnataka Legislative Assembly election representing Indian National Congress.

== Early life and education ==
Konaraddi is from Navalgund, Dharwad district. His father Hanumareddy Konarddy is a farmer. He completed his graduation in commerce in 1983.

== Career ==
Konaraddi won from Navalgund Assembly constituency representing Indian National Congress in the 2023 Karnataka Legislative Assembly election. He polled 86,081 votes and defeated his nearest rival, Shankar Patil Munenakoppa of Bharatiya Janata Party, by a margin of 22,199 votes. He became an MLA for the first time in 2013 representing Janata Dal (Secular), winning the 2013 Karnataka Legislative Assembly election. He lost as a Janata Dal (S) candidate to BJP's Shankar B. Patil Munenakoppa in the 2018 Karnataka Legislative Assembly election. Later, he shifted to Indian National Congress in December 2021.

In August 2024, he led a protest march in Dharwad against the governor's decision to permit investigation against the chief minister in the MUDA scam.
