= Mahantesh Doddagoudar =

Indian politician

Member of the Karnataka Legislative Assembly
- In office 2018–2023
- Constituency: Kittur Assembly constituency

Personal details
- Born: 2 September 1973
- Party: Bharatiya Janata Party

Mahantesh Doddagoudar (born 2 September 1973) is an Indian politician who has been a member of the Bharatiya Janata Party (BJP). He served as the Member of the Legislative Assembly representing the Kittur constituency in Karnataka from 2018 to 2023.

== Early life ==
Mahantesh was born on 2 September 1973, to Basavantaray Doddagoudar in Karnataka. He pursued a LLB degree from R.L. College, Belagavi, graduating in 1997–98.

== Political career ==
In 2018, Mahantesh was selected by the BJP to contest the Karnataka Legislative Assembly election from the Kittur constituency. He won the election, securing 73,155 votes and defeating his main opponent, B. D. Inamdar, the candidate from the Indian National Congress (INC).

In the 2023 elections, Mahantesh sought re-election from the Kittur constituency. However, he lost the seat to Babasaheb Patil, the INC candidate.
