= Mahantesh G Kivadasannavar =

Indian sports figure and cricketer

- Born: 28 September 1970 (age 55); Neginhal, Bailhongal, Belgaum, India
- Organization: Samarthanam Trust for the Disabled Cricket Association for the Blind in India
- Website: https://www.mahanteshgk.com

Dr Mahantesh G Kivadasannavar (born 28 September 1970 in Neginhal) is an Indian former cricket player and sports executive who is the President of Differently-abled Cricket Council DCCII Cricket Association for the Blind in India (CABI), and Ex President of World Blind Cricket Ltd

== CABI ==
A blind cricket player, Mahantesh founded CABI, which trains blind cricket players to compete in India and internationally. He mentored the men's Indian Blind Cricket team which placed 1st and 2nd in the T20 World Cup in 2012 and 2017, 4th and 5th in the ODI World Championship in 2014 and 2018,

The Asia Cup in 2016, Bilateral Series 2018 and Triangular Series in 2018 are the blind cricket series won by the Indian team under Mahantesh's leadership.

== World Blind Cricket Limited ==
Mahantesh was elected twice as the President of the World Blind Cricket Limited. As president, he was able to encourage young players to pursue cricket as a career. Mahantesh advocated for the further development and increased recognition of blind cricket.
