= Ramdurg Assembly constituency =

Legislative Assembly constituency in Karnataka, India

Coordinates: 15.95°N 75.30°E

Ramdurg
- Constituency No. 18 for the Karnataka Legislative Assembly

Constituency details
- Country: India
- Region: South India
- State: Karnataka
- District: Belagavi
- Lok Sabha constituency: Belagavi
- Established: 1951
- Total electors: 203,880
- Reservation: None

Member of Legislative Assembly
- 16th Karnataka Legislative Assembly
- Incumbent Ashok Pattan
- Party: Indian National Congress
- Elected year: 2023
- Preceded by: Mahadevappa Yadawad

Ramdurg Assembly constituency is one of the 224 seats in Karnataka State Assembly in India. It is part of Belagavi Lok Sabha constituency.

== Members of the Legislative Assembly ==
Election	Member	Party
1952	Mumbaraddi Hanamanta Yallappa	Indian National Congress
1957	Pattan Mahadevappa Shivabasappa	Independent politician
1962	Ramanagouda Shivashiddappagouda Patil	Indian National Congress
1967	Pattan Mahadevappa Shivabasappa	Indian National Congress
1972	Ramanagouda Shivashiddappagouda Patil	Indian National Congress
1978	Ramanagouda Shivashiddappagouda Patil	Indian National Congress
1983	Koppad Fakirappa Allappa	Indian National Congress
1985	Hireraddi Basavantappa Basappa	Janata Party
1989	Patil Rudragouda Tikangouda	Indian National Congress
1994	Hireraddi Basavantappa Basappa	Janata Dal
1999	Patil. N. V	Indian National Congress
2004	Mahadevappa Yadawad	Bharatiya Janata Party
2008	Ashok Mahadevappa Pattan	Indian National Congress
2013	Ashok Mahadevappa Pattan	Indian National Congress
2018	Mahadevappa Yadawad	Bharatiya Janata Party
2023	Ashok Mahadevappa Pattan	Indian National Congress

== Election results ==
=== Assembly Election 2023 ===
2023 Karnataka Legislative Assembly election : Ramdurg
Party	Candidate	Votes	%	±%
INC	Ashok Mahadevappa Pattan	80,294	52.13%	▲8.86
BJP	Chikkarevanna	68,564	44.51%	▼0.66
NOTA	None of the above	1,646	1.07%	▼0.06
JD(S)	Prakash Bhirappa Mudhol	1,105	0.72%	▼0.78
Independent	Shivappa Basappa Bakadi	984	0.64%	New
Margin of victory		11,730	7.62%	▲5.72
Turnout		155,023	76.04%	▲0.51
Total valid votes		154,029		
Registered electors		203,880		▲1.65
INC gain from BJP		Swing	▲6.96	

=== Assembly Election 2018 ===
2018 Karnataka Legislative Assembly election : Ramdurg
Party	Candidate	Votes	%	±%
BJP	Mahadevappa Yadawad	68,349	45.17%	▲16.26
INC	Ashok Mahadevappa Pattan	65,474	43.27%	▲10.51
Independent	Panchakattimath Ramesh Chandrayy	8,427	5.57%	New
JD(S)	Javeedsab. M	2,266	1.50%	▼11.90
NOTA	None of the above	1,704	1.13%	New
CPI(M)	Gaibu Jainekhan	1,516	1.00%	New
Indian New Congress Party	Siddappa Maritammappa Angadi	925	0.61%	New
Margin of victory		2,875	1.90%	▼1.96
Turnout		151,498	75.53%	▲0.53
Total valid votes		151,328		
Registered electors		200,580		▲16.38
BJP gain from INC		Swing	▲12.41	

=== Assembly Election 2013 ===
2013 Karnataka Legislative Assembly election : Ramdurg
Party	Candidate	Votes	%	±%
INC	Ashok Mahadevappa Pattan	42,310	32.76%	▼12.53
BJP	Mahadevappa Yadawad	37,326	28.91%	▼16.03
JD(S)	Parappagouda Fakiragouda Patil	17,303	13.40%	▲10.15
KJP	Sangayya Chandrayya Panchakatimath	16,043	12.42%	New
JD(U)	Aravind Mahadevarao Dalawai	10,314	7.99%	New
Independent	Siddappa Maritammappa Angadi	2,053	1.59%	New
NCP	Bharat Paragouda Patil	904	0.70%	New
BSRCP	Ramesh Hanamantappa Halli	895	0.69%	New
Margin of victory		4,984	3.86%	▲3.51
Turnout		129,264	75.00%	▲2.76
Total valid votes		129,132		
Registered electors		172,345		▲14.47
INC hold		Swing	▼12.53	

=== Assembly Election 2008 ===
2008 Karnataka Legislative Assembly election : Ramdurg
Party	Candidate	Votes	%	±%
INC	Ashok Mahadevappa Pattan	49,246	45.29%	▲15.55
BJP	Mahadevappa Shivalingappa Yadawad	48,862	44.94%	▼9.27
JD(S)	Basavaraj Basavantappa Hireraddi	3,538	3.25%	▼2.29
Independent	Surekha Beerappa Midakanatti	2,283	2.10%	New
Independent	Dr. Y. B. Kulgod	1,955	1.80%	New
BSP	Shankar Munavalli	1,187	1.09%	New
Margin of victory		384	0.35%	▼24.12
Turnout		108,762	72.24%	▲4.15
Total valid votes		108,739		
Registered electors		150,553		▼1.80
INC gain from BJP		Swing	▼8.92	

=== Assembly Election 2004 ===
2004 Karnataka Legislative Assembly election : Ramdurg
Party	Candidate	Votes	%	±%
BJP	Mahadevappa Yadawad	56,585	54.21%	▲48.04
INC	Ashok Mahadevappa Pattan	31,044	29.74%	▼8.19
CPI(M)	V. P. Kulkarni	7,160	6.86%	New
JD(S)	Manoli Tippanna Parappa	5,788	5.54%	▼12.39
Kannada Nadu Party	Murkatnal Tammaji Tukaram	2,115	2.03%	New
JP	Patil Hanamantagouda Sanganagouda	1,697	1.63%	New
Margin of victory		25,541	24.47%	▲21.89
Turnout		104,390	68.09%	▲0.09
Total valid votes		104,389		
Registered electors		153,320		▲8.38
BJP gain from INC		Swing	▲16.28	

=== Assembly Election 1999 ===
1999 Karnataka Legislative Assembly election : Ramdurg
Party	Candidate	Votes	%	±%
INC	Patil. N. V	33,779	37.93%	▲23.36
JD(U)	Mahadevappa Yadawad	31,485	35.35%	New
JD(S)	Kamatar Laxman Uddappa	15,969	17.93%	New
BJP	Madannavar Shreedevi Basavaraj	5,494	6.17%	▼2.31
Independent	Patil Mohanagouda Rayanagouda	2,332	2.62%	New
Margin of victory		2,294	2.58%	▼21.73
Turnout		96,198	68.00%	▼0.64
Total valid votes		89,059		
Rejected ballots		7,039	7.32%	▲5.02
Registered electors		141,469		▲8.28
INC gain from JD		Swing	▼0.95	

=== Assembly Election 1994 ===
1994 Karnataka Legislative Assembly election : Ramdurg
Party	Candidate	Votes	%	±%
JD	Hireraddi Basavantappa Basappa	34,063	38.88%	▲6.13
INC	Patil Rudragouda Tikangouda	12,767	14.57%	▼27.45
KRRS	Sakri Mallikarjun Basavantappa	9,743	11.12%	New
INC	Mahadevgouda Ayyanagouda Patil	9,017	10.29%	New
Independent	R. S. Patil	7,885	9.00%	New
BJP	Arjun Vittal Hampiholi	7,428	8.48%	New
CPI(M)	V. P. Kulkarni	2,989	3.41%	New
Independent	Shankar Munavalli	1,293	1.48%	New
Independent	Rathi Kamalkishor Giridharlal	924	1.05%	New
Margin of victory		21,296	24.31%	▲15.03
Turnout		89,688	68.64%	▲0.20
Total valid votes		87,615		
Rejected ballots		2,062	2.30%	▼3.54
Registered electors		130,657		▲8.33
JD gain from INC		Swing	▼3.14	

=== Assembly Election 1989 ===
1989 Karnataka Legislative Assembly election : Ramdurg
Party	Candidate	Votes	%	±%
INC	Patil Rudragouda Tikangouda	32,662	42.02%	▲0.35
JD	Hireraddi Basavantappa Basappa	25,453	32.75%	New
Kranti Sabha	Sakri Mallikarjun Basavantappa	15,192	19.55%	New
JP	Gouroji Ramesh Muruteppa	2,751	3.54%	New
Independent	Shankar Hanamantappa Munavalli	645	0.83%	New
Margin of victory		7,209	9.28%	▼5.50
Turnout		82,543	68.44%	▼6.27
Total valid votes		77,722		
Rejected ballots		4,821	5.84%	▲3.79
Registered electors		120,606		▲29.64
INC gain from JP		Swing	▼14.43	

=== Assembly Election 1985 ===
1985 Karnataka Legislative Assembly election : Ramdurg
Party	Candidate	Votes	%	±%
JP	Hireraddi Basavantappa Basappa	38,425	56.45%	▲32.17
INC	Fakirappa Allappa	28,364	41.67%	▼23.11
Independent	Shankar Munavalli	649	0.95%	New
Margin of victory		10,061	14.78%	▼25.72
Turnout		69,501	74.71%	▲17.12
Total valid votes		68,075		
Rejected ballots		1,426	2.05%	▼1.48
Registered electors		93,033		▲5.67
JP gain from INC		Swing	▼8.33	

=== Assembly Election 1983 ===
1983 Karnataka Legislative Assembly election : Ramdurg
Party	Candidate	Votes	%	±%
INC	Koppad Fakirappa Allappa	31,688	64.78%	▲58.28
JP	Gouroji Ramesh Muruteppa	11,877	24.28%	▼10.29
BJP	Chandargi Maruti Yankappa	4,640	9.49%	New
Independent	Nyamagoudat Dundappagouda Hanamappagouda	708	1.45%	New
Margin of victory		19,811	40.50%	▲19.01
Turnout		50,704	57.59%	▼17.38
Total valid votes		48,913		
Rejected ballots		1,791	3.53%	▲0.25
Registered electors		88,042		▲8.43
INC gain from INC(I)		Swing	▲8.72	

=== Assembly Election 1978 ===
1978 Karnataka Legislative Assembly election : Ramdurg
Party	Candidate	Votes	%	±%
INC(I)	Ramanagouda Shivashiddappagouda Patil	33,010	56.06%	New
JP	Hireraddi Basavantappa Basappa	20,355	34.57%	New
INC	Somagonda Hanamappa Veerappa	3,825	6.50%	▼51.43
Independent	Sakri Mallikarjun Basappa	1,386	2.35%	New
Margin of victory		12,655	21.49%	▼1.61
Turnout		60,879	74.97%	▲12.02
Total valid votes		58,885		
Rejected ballots		1,994	3.28%	▲3.28
Registered electors		81,200		▲18.09
INC(I) gain from INC		Swing	▼1.87	

=== Assembly Election 1972 ===
1972 Mysore State Legislative Assembly election : Ramdurg
Party	Candidate	Votes	%	±%
INC	R. S. Patil	23,968	57.93%	▼8.58
INC(O)	Sharadaua W/o. M. Pattan	14,409	34.83%	New
Independent	S. S. Channappa	1,139	2.75%	New
ABJS	B. V. Huchappa	789	1.91%	▼0.38
Independent	K. S. Ranganathrao	674	1.63%	New
Independent	V. M. Shidalingayya	394	0.95%	New
Margin of victory		9,559	23.10%	▼13.74
Turnout		43,285	62.95%	▼6.81
Total valid votes		41,373		
Registered electors		68,760		▲13.82
INC hold		Swing	▼8.58	

=== Assembly Election 1967 ===
1967 Mysore State Legislative Assembly election : Ramdurg
Party	Candidate	Votes	%	±%
INC	P. S. Madevappa	26,386	66.51%	▲14.57
Independent	H. B. Basappa	11,768	29.66%	New
ABJS	R. Narayan	908	2.29%	New
Independent	K. S. Ranganathrao	613	1.55%	New
Margin of victory		14,618	36.84%	▲32.97
Turnout		42,140	69.76%	▼2.53
Total valid votes		39,675		
Registered electors		60,411		▲10.57
INC hold		Swing	▲14.57	

=== Assembly Election 1962 ===
1962 Mysore State Legislative Assembly election : Ramdurg
Party	Candidate	Votes	%	±%
INC	Ramanagouda Shivashiddappagouda Patil	19,287	51.94%	▲10.57
Lok Sewak Sangh	Pattan Mahadevappa Shivabasappa	17,849	48.06%	New
Margin of victory		1,438	3.87%	▼13.38
Turnout		39,499	72.29%	▲9.44
Total valid votes		37,136		
Registered electors		54,636		▲16.96
INC gain from Independent		Swing	▼6.69	

=== Assembly Election 1957 ===
1957 Mysore State Legislative Assembly election : Ramdurg
Party	Candidate	Votes	%	±%
Independent	Pattan Mahadevappa Shivabasappa	17,212	58.63%	New
INC	Timmaraddi Venkaraddi Shiddaraddi	12,147	41.37%	▼24.13
Margin of victory		5,065	17.25%	▼13.75
Turnout		29,359	62.85%	▼1.19
Total valid votes		29,359		
Registered electors		46,715		▲2.71
Independent gain from INC		Swing	▼6.87	

=== Assembly Election 1952 ===
1952 Bombay State Legislative Assembly election : Ramdurg
Party	Candidate	Votes	%	±%
INC	Mumbaraddi Hanamanta Yallappa	19,078	65.50%	New
KMPP	Patil Lingangouda Andanigouda	10,049	34.50%	New
Margin of victory		9,029	31.00%	
Turnout		29,127	64.04%	
Total valid votes		29,127		
Registered electors		45,483		
INC win (new seat)				

== See also ==
- Belagavi District
- List of constituencies of Karnataka Legislative Assembly
