= Ramesha Bandisiddegowda =

Indian politician

A. B. Ramesha Bandisiddegowda (born 1975) is an Indian politician from Karnataka. He is a three time member of the Karnataka Legislative Assembly from Shrirangapattana Assembly constituency in Mandya district. He represented Indian National Congress Party and won the 2023 Karnataka Legislative Assembly election.

== Early life and education ==
Ramesha is from Shrirangapattana. His father A S Bandisiddegowda is a former Janata Party MLA from Shrirangapattana, winning two times in 1983 and 1985. He did his Diploma in Electronic and Telecommunication at D. Banumayya College, Mysore but discontinued in the final year in 1990.

== Career ==
Ramesha won from Shrirangapattana Assembly constituency representing Indian National Congress in the 2023 Karnataka Legislative Assembly election. He polled 72,817 votes and defeated his nearest rival, Ravindra Srikantaiah of Janata Dal (Secular), by a margin of 11,137 votes. Earlier, he became an MLA for the first time winning against actor and Congress candidate M. H. Ambareesh in the 2008 Karnataka Legislative Assembly election representing Janata Dal (S) and retained the seat in the 2013 Karnataka Legislative Assembly election. He lost the next election in 2018 to Srikantaiah of JD(S) but moved to Congress and won the 2023 election from the same seat.

He was Appointed as chairman for Chamundeshwari Electricity Supply Corporation (Cescom) on 26 January 2024.
