= Samarthanam Trust for the Disabled =

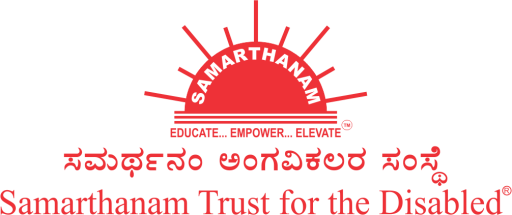
- Founded: 1997
- Type: Not for Profit - Registered Trust
- Location: Bangalore, India
- Region served: India
- Website: Official website

Samarthanam Trust for the Disabled, founded in 1997, is a non-profit organization providing education, accommodation, food, vocational training and placement based rehabilitation. It is based in Bangalore, India with centers across India and abroad. The organization is affiliated to the World Blind Union and received Special UN Consultative Status in 2015.

== History ==
Samarthanam Trust for the Disabled was established in the year 1997 by Mahantesh G Kivadasannavar along with his schoolmate and childhood friend, Late. Nagesh SP. The founders, being visually impaired and having witnessed various challenges, have together conceptualized Samarthanam, an organization which would cater to people with disabilities, including visually impaired and underprivileged. Education was conceived to be the basic right of every individual, irrespective of status and disability. And hence they initiated on the development of various programmes at primary, secondary and higher education levels and also various other initiatives solely dedicated for visually impaired and underserved. As the organization's objective and drive started gathering support, Samarthanam's areas of service also widened. The organization moved onto establishing Livelihood Resource Centres, Rehabilitation Centres, Social Enterprises and a Sports Association for the visually impaired. Samarthanam expanded and fortified to be recognized as an umbrella organization, offering services to people with disabilities, underserved and women in distress.

== Affiliations ==
- World Blind Union
- World Blind Cricket Council
- State Government of Karnataka, GOI
- Boston University
- University of Chicago
- CII
- Empanelment with Department of empowerment of Persons with disabilities
- Ministry of Social Justice, GOI
- United Way
- CAF
- Give India
- Give2Asia
- NASSCOM

== Education and nutrition ==
Samarthanam runs integrated primary and secondary schools and supports visually impaired students pursuing higher education. In the Class 10 Board exams held in 2012, the school had a pass percentage of 94.11%, with the school topper scoring 84.8%. Samarthanam uses technology to nullify disability. A barrier-free, accessible residential school is under construction. A sum of Rs. 1 crore was allocated by the Karnataka Chief Minister in the state budget towards construction of the school.

Samarthanam schools for students with intellectual disabilities have been established in Bangalore, Mysore, and Belagavi. The schools provide basic education, life skill activities, ADLS training, vocational training and aim to make the individual independent to the extent possible.

Samarthanam Residential School for children with hearing Impairments, Bangalore was set up in 2019 with classes from 1st standard to 8th standard.Currently the HI school has 40 students.

As part of 'Vidyaprasad', Samarthanam provides mid-day meals to children in government schools.

'Shrishti', Samarthanam's BPO training units in Hubli-Dharwad and Peenya, provide soft skills and call center training to people with disabilities.

== Sports ==
Samarthanam athletes took home seven medals at the 17th National Sports Meet for the Blind (2010) held at Chandigarh. Samarthanam's medal tally included three golds and Subramani broke the national record in shot put.

Samarthanam promotes chess for the blind. The FIDE rating National Open Chess Tournament for the Blind 2012 was organized by Samarthanam, in association with All India Chess Federation for the Blind.

The previous governing body handed over the responsibility of organizing cricket for the blind in India to Samarthanam. Samarthanam funded the Indian team's tour of England where the Indian team defeated England in a four-match one-day series. The Indian team, in collaboration with Samarthanam, also travelled to Pakistan to play the Indo-Pak series. Cricket Association for the Blind in India (CABI) is Samarthanam's sports initiative. The T–20 World Cup Cricket for the Blind is to be held in Bangalore in December 2012. Australia, Bangladesh, England, India, New Zealand, Pakistan, South Africa, West Indies, Sri Lanka and Nepal will be taking part, and Saurav Ganguly is the Brand Ambassador for the event.

== Rehabilitation ==
- Residential Rehabilitation and Counseling Center for Women in Distress
- Rural BPO/Call Center Unit

Samarthanam's Rural BPO - 'Kirana' - went live in 2011. The BPO was launched in association with the state-run Karnataka Biotechnology and Information Services (KBITS). The center provides employment opportunities to people with disabilities and rural youth.

== Other areas of work ==
- Culture: 'Sunadha' is Samarthanam's troupe comprising visually impaired dancers. 'Sunadha' has performed across India, the U.S. and U.K.
- Environment: 'Parisara' is Samarthanam's environmental initiative.

== Awards ==
- Samarthanam was awarded the Governor's award for Excellence from the government of Karnataka, in 2002
- Founder Managing Trustee Mr. Mahantesh received the National Award for Child Welfare 2009 from the President of India
- Mr. Mahantesh was conferred with the Aryabhatta International Award, in 2009
- Mr. Mahantesh was honoured with the NDTV Spirit of Sport Award for 2011, in the Against the Odds - Lifetime Achievement category

== See also ==
- Blind cricket
