= Shrirangapattana Assembly constituency =

Legislative Assembly constituency in Karnataka State, India

Coordinates: 12.42°N 76.69°E

Shrirangapattana
- Constituency No. 190 for the Karnataka Legislative Assembly

Constituency details
- Country: India
- Region: South India
- State: Karnataka
- District: Mandya
- Lok Sabha constituency: Mandya
- Established: 1951
- Total electors: 213,244
- Reservation: None

Member of Legislative Assembly
- 16th Karnataka Legislative Assembly
- Incumbent Ramesh Bandisiddegowda
- Party: Indian National Congress
- Elected year: 2023
- Preceded by: Ravindra Srikantaiah

Shrirangapattana Assembly constituency is one of the 224 Legislative Assembly constituencies of Karnataka in India.

It is part of Mandya district.

A. B. Ramesha Bandisiddegowda is the current MLA from this constituency.

== Members of the Legislative Assembly ==
Election	Member	Party
1952	Kalastavadi Puttaswamy	Indian National Congress
1957	A. G. Chunche Gowda	Independent politician
1962	A. G. Bandigowda	Indian National Congress
1967	B. Doddaboregowda	Independent politician
1972	Damayanthi Bore Gowda	Indian National Congress
1978	M. Srinivas	Janata Party
1983	A. S. Bandisiddegowda	Janata Party
1985	A. S. Bandisiddegowda	Janata Party
1986 by-election (Note: Death of A. S. Bandisiddegowda)	Vijayalaxmanna	Janata Party
1989	Damayanthi Bore Gowda	Indian National Congress
1994	Vijayalakshmamma Bandi Siddegowda	Janata Dal
1999	Parvathamma Srikantaiah	Indian National Congress
2004	Vijayalakshmamma Bandi Siddegowda	Janata Dal
2008	Ramesha Bandisiddegowda	Janata Dal
2013	Ramesha Bandisiddegowda	Janata Dal
2018	Ravindra Srikantaiah	Janata Dal
2023	Ramesha Bandisiddegowda	Indian National Congress

== Election results ==
=== Assembly election 2023 ===
2023 Karnataka Legislative Assembly election: Shrirangapattana
Party	Candidate	Votes	%	±%
INC	Ramesha Bandisiddegowda	72,817	39.32	▲6.70
JD(S)	Ravindra Srikantaiah	61,680	33.31	▼24.04
BJP	S. Sacchidananda	42,306	22.84	▲16.43
Independent	Taggahalli Venkatesh	3,266	1.76	New
NOTA	None of the above	1,048	0.57	▲0.03
Margin of victory		11,137	6.01	▼18.72
Turnout		185,235	86.87	▲2.32
Total valid votes		185,194		
Registered electors		213,244		▲2.06
INC gain from JD(S)		Swing	▼18.03	

=== Assembly election 2018 ===
2018 Karnataka Legislative Assembly election: Shrirangapattana
Party	Candidate	Votes	%	±%
JD(S)	Ravindra Srikantaiah	101,307	57.35	▲23.61
INC	Ramesha Bandisiddegowda	57,619	32.62	▲16.00
BJP	Nanjundegowda. K. S	11,326	6.41	▲4.93
AAP	C. S. Venkatesha	1,941	1.10	New
Independent	Mohan Kumar U. Kirangooru Paapu	1,736	0.98	New
NOTA	None of the above	946	0.54	New
Margin of victory		43,688	24.73	▲16.40
Turnout		176,659	84.55	▲3.70
Total valid votes		176,655		
Registered electors		208,945		▲6.98
JD(S) hold		Swing	▲23.61	

=== Assembly election 2013 ===
2013 Karnataka Legislative Assembly election: Shrirangapattana
Party	Candidate	Votes	%	±%
JD(S)	Ramesha Bandisiddegowda	55,204	33.74	▼3.24
Independent	Ravindra Srikantaiah	41,580	25.41	New
INC	S. L. Lingaraju	27,197	16.62	▼16.70
SKP	K. S. Nanjunde Gowda	24,075	14.71	▼4.79
BJP	T. Sridhara	2,427	1.48	▼3.65
Independent	M. Suresha	1,605	0.98	New
Independent	Shambhulingegowda Gandhivaadi	1,604	0.98	New
BSP	Rathnamma Basavaiah	1,433	0.88	▼0.92
BSRCP	Ganjam Shivu	1,014	0.62	New
Margin of victory		13,624	8.33	▲4.68
Turnout		157,922	80.85	▲2.98
Total valid votes		163,624		
Registered electors		195,318		▲7.57
JD(S) hold		Swing	▼3.24	

=== Assembly election 2008 ===
2008 Karnataka Legislative Assembly election: Shrirangapattana
Party	Candidate	Votes	%	±%
JD(S)	Ramesha Bandisiddegowda	52,234	36.98	▲12.66
INC	Ambaresh @ Amarnath	47,074	33.32	▲14.13
SKP	K. S. Nanjunde Gowda	27,547	19.50	New
BJP	Pooja M. Santhosh	7,242	5.13	▼7.06
BSP	B. Lingaiah	2,540	1.80	▼0.57
Independent	Krishnamurthy	2,161	1.53	New
Swarna Yuga Party	Sundhally Somashekar	1,802	1.28	New
Margin of victory		5,160	3.65	▲2.53
Turnout		141,398	77.87	▲3.00
Total valid votes		141,258		
Registered electors		181,581		▲20.76
JD(S) hold		Swing	▲12.66	

=== Assembly election 2004 ===
2004 Karnataka Legislative Assembly election: Shrirangapattana
Party	Candidate	Votes	%	±%
JD(S)	Vijayalakshmamma Bandi Siddegowda	27,371	24.32	▲10.02
KRRS	Nanjundegowda. K. S	26,113	23.20	▼1.84
INC	Parvathamma Srikantaiah	21,600	19.19	▼28.24
JP	Santosh. M	18,108	16.09	New
BJP	M. Srinivas	13,716	12.19	▲0.17
BSP	Suresh. V	2,669	2.37	▲1.79
Independent	Yogananda Patel Marigowda	1,876	1.67	New
Kannada Nadu Party	Anandaraju. C	1,081	0.96	New
Margin of victory		1,258	1.12	▼21.27
Turnout		112,582	74.87	▼2.57
Total valid votes		112,534		
Registered electors		150,363		▲8.71
JD(S) gain from INC		Swing	▼23.11	

=== Assembly election 1999 ===
1999 Karnataka Legislative Assembly election: Shrirangapattana
Party	Candidate	Votes	%	±%
INC	Parvathamma Srikantaiah	47,866	47.43	▲36.02
KRRS	K. S. Nanjunde Gowda	25,273	25.04	New
JD(S)	Vijayalakshmamma Bandi Siddegowda	14,428	14.30	New
BJP	K. Balaramu	12,136	12.02	▲4.75
Independent	G. S. Shankaraiah	642	0.64	New
Margin of victory		22,593	22.39	▼0.40
Turnout		107,122	77.44	▼1.28
Total valid votes		100,926		
Rejected ballots		6,196	5.78	▲4.10
Registered electors		138,321		▲4.12
INC gain from JD		Swing	▲5.55	

=== Assembly election 1994 ===
1994 Karnataka Legislative Assembly election: Shrirangapattana
Party	Candidate	Votes	%	±%
JD	Vijayalakshmamma Bandi Siddegowda	43,062	41.88	▲33.19
Independent	K. S. Nanjunde Gowda	19,635	19.10	New
Independent	A. C. Srikantaiah	16,193	15.75	New
INC	Damayanthi Bore Gowda	11,728	11.41	▼22.59
BJP	S. Linganna	7,479	7.27	▲6.44
BSP	K. Siddappa	2,487	2.42	New
Independent	Chandra Kumara	1,041	1.01	New
Margin of victory		23,427	22.79	▲18.96
Turnout		104,573	78.72	▲3.65
Total valid votes		102,811		
Rejected ballots		1,762	1.68	▼5.95
Registered electors		132,849		▲7.40
JD gain from INC		Swing	▲7.88	

=== Assembly election 1989 ===
1989 Karnataka Legislative Assembly election: Shrirangapattana
Party	Candidate	Votes	%	±%
INC	Damayanthi Bore Gowda	29,159	34.00	▼11.75
JP	Vijayalakshmanmma	25,876	30.17	New
Kranti Sabha	K. S. Nanjunde Gowda	18,851	21.98	New
JD	A. H. Narayan	7,457	8.69	New
Independent	J. Siddaiah	2,667	3.11	New
BJP	A. P. Bhramalingu	709	0.83	New
Margin of victory		3,283	3.83	▼2.34
Turnout		92,854	75.07	
Total valid votes		85,770		
Rejected ballots		7,084	7.63	
Registered electors		123,697		
INC gain from JP		Swing	▼17.92	

=== Assembly by-election 1986 ===
1986 Karnataka Legislative Assembly by-election: Shrirangapattana
Party	Candidate	Votes	%	±%
JP	Vijayalaxmanna	38,855	51.92	▼0.08
INC	A. C. Srikantaiah	34,241	45.75	▲1.38
Independent	B. Doddaboregowda	1,743	2.33	New
Margin of victory		4,614	6.17	▼1.46
Total valid votes		74,839		
JP hold		Swing	▼0.08	

=== Assembly election 1985 ===
1985 Karnataka Legislative Assembly election: Shrirangapattana
Party	Candidate	Votes	%	±%
JP	A. S. Bandisiddegowda	39,163	52.00	▼5.78
INC	A. C. Srikantaiah	33,416	44.37	▲3.61
Independent	Leela. S. V. Suresh	1,807	2.40	New
Margin of victory		5,747	7.63	▼9.39
Turnout		76,418	78.11	▲1.68
Total valid votes		75,312		
Rejected ballots		1,106	1.45	▼0.54
Registered electors		97,834		▲15.58
JP hold		Swing	▼5.78	

=== Assembly election 1983 ===
1983 Karnataka Legislative Assembly election: Shrirangapattana
Party	Candidate	Votes	%	±%
JP	A. S. Bandisiddegowda	36,634	57.78	▲24.11
INC	M. Srinivas	25,843	40.76	▲35.01
Independent	S. N. Chaluvappa	925	1.46	New
Margin of victory		10,791	17.02	▲14.54
Turnout		64,692	76.43	▼3.29
Total valid votes		63,402		
Rejected ballots		1,290	1.99	▼0.33
Registered electors		84,647		▲10.25
JP hold		Swing	▲24.11	

=== Assembly election 1978 ===
1978 Karnataka Legislative Assembly election: Shrirangapattana
Party	Candidate	Votes	%	±%
JP	M. Srinivas	20,127	33.67	New
INC(I)	C. L. Govindaraju	18,647	31.19	New
Independent	A. C. Srikantaiah	17,576	29.40	New
INC	N. Nanjegowda	3,436	5.75	▼40.96
Margin of victory		1,480	2.48	▼10.36
Turnout		61,204	79.72	▲15.29
Total valid votes		59,786		
Rejected ballots		1,418	2.32	▲2.32
Registered electors		76,777		▼13.34
JP gain from INC		Swing	▼13.04	

=== Assembly election 1972 ===
1972 Mysore State Legislative Assembly election: Shrirangapattana
Party	Candidate	Votes	%	±%
INC	Damayanthi Bore Gowda	25,965	46.71	▲13.60
INC(O)	A. C. Srikantaiah	18,826	33.86	New
Independent	B. Bouda Bors Gowda	10,801	19.43	New
Margin of victory		7,139	12.84	▲12.63
Turnout		57,084	64.43	▼1.57
Total valid votes		55,592		
Registered electors		88,598		▲27.21
INC gain from Independent		Swing	▲13.39	

=== Assembly election 1967 ===
1967 Mysore State Legislative Assembly election: Shrirangapattana
Party	Candidate	Votes	%	±%
Independent	B. Doddaboregowda	13,883	33.32	New
INC	A. C. Srikantaiah	13,794	33.11	▼37.70
Independent	A. S. Bandisiddegowda	9,651	23.17	New
Independent	L. Narasimhaswamy	4,332	10.40	New
Margin of victory		89	0.21	▼42.67
Turnout		45,963	66.00	▲7.54
Total valid votes		41,660		
Registered electors		69,646		▲13.51
Independent gain from INC		Swing	▼37.49	

=== Assembly election 1962 ===
1962 Mysore State Legislative Assembly election: Shrirangapattana
Party	Candidate	Votes	%	±%
INC	A. G. Bandigowda	23,809	70.81	▲32.63
Independent	A. G. Chunche Gowda	9,389	27.92	New
Independent	B. M. Bettegowda	427	1.27	New
Margin of victory		14,420	42.88	▲19.24
Turnout		35,870	58.46	▼0.22
Total valid votes		33,625		
Registered electors		61,358		▲21.75
INC gain from Independent		Swing	▲8.99	

=== Assembly election 1957 ===
1957 Mysore State Legislative Assembly election: Shrirangapattana
Party	Candidate	Votes	%	±%
Independent	A. G. Chunche Gowda	18,280	61.82	New
INC	A. G. Bandigowda	11,290	38.18	▼23.29
Margin of victory		6,990	23.64	▲0.70
Turnout		29,570	58.68	▲3.58
Total valid votes		29,570		
Registered electors		50,395		▲35.66
Independent gain from INC		Swing	▲0.35	

=== Assembly election 1952 ===
1952 Mysore State Legislative Assembly election: Shrirangapattana
Party	Candidate	Votes	%	±%
INC	Kalastavadi Puttaswamy	12,581	61.47	New
Independent	A. G. Chunche Gowda	7,886	38.53	New
Margin of victory		4,695	22.94	
Turnout		20,467	55.10	
Total valid votes		20,467		
Registered electors		37,147		
INC win (new seat)				

== See also ==
- List of constituencies of the Karnataka Legislative Assembly
