= Cricket Association for the Blind in India =

Apex body conducting cricket for the blind across India

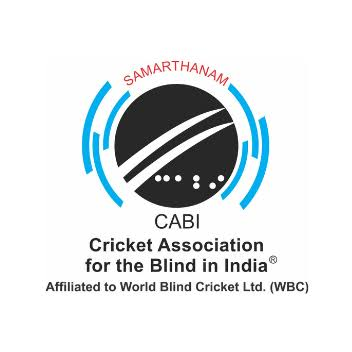
- Sport: Blind cricket
- Jurisdiction: India
- Abbreviation: CABI
- Founded: 2011
- Affiliation: World Blind Cricket Council (WBCC)
- Headquarters: Sector 4, HSR Layout, Bengaluru, India
- Chairman: Mahantesh Kivadasannavar

Official website
- www.blindcricket.in
- Other key staff: Dhiraj Sequeira - Manager Niranjan Suresh - Media Head Shika Shetty - Womens Cricket Manager
- (India)

The Cricket Association for the Blind in India (CABI) is the apex body conducting cricket for the blind across India, having inherited responsibility in 2010 from the former Association for Cricket for the Blind in India (ACBI). Registered in 2011 as a non-profit organization, CABI is affiliated with the World Blind Cricket Council (WBCC) and promotes blind cricket both as a rightful pursuit and as a platform for the physical and social development of the visually impaired. Financial support is received from a range of public- and private-sector organizations.

== Objectives ==
- To create awareness about the abilities and talent of visually impaired youth through various platforms and provide opportunities for the exhibition of skills to a large audience.
- To organize a regular domestic calendar with coaching camps, tournaments at various levels as well as bilateral series and overseas tours
- To create a strong network and infrastructure by taking on board active local bodies and blind schools; formulating guidelines to monitor the same
- To help local bodies organize local level tournaments to spot talent; form teams with coaches, physiotherapists, trainers, umpires and other personnel to oversee them
- To work towards getting support from and affiliation with relevant public and private bodies

== Officebearers ==
- George Abraham (Founder and President) - 1996
- S. P. Nagesh (President)
- G. K. Mahantesh (General Secretary)
- D. E. John (Treasurer)

== Important tournaments ==
National / International Tournaments	Year
Pakistan-India Petro Cup Series in Delhi – India won	2005
World Cup in Islamabad - Team India is runner-up	2006
India-England series in England – India won	2007
National Cricket Tournament for the Blind India-England Series in England – India won	2010 CABI is formed
National Cricket Tournament for the Blind India-Pakistan series in Pakistan – Pakistan won	2011
National Cricket Tournament for the Blind India-Pakistan series in India – India won First T-20 World Cup tournament – India won	2012
National Cricket Tournament for the Blind	2013
India-Pakistan series in Pakistan - Pakistan won National Cricket Tournament for the Blind One Day International World Cup Championship in South Africa- India won	2014
National Cricket Tournament for the Blind	2015
National Cricket Tournament for the Blind Asia Cup (Jan 2016) at Kochi, Kerala Second T-20 World Cup (Nov-Dec) in multiple cities across India	2016

== Important milestones ==
=== First T-20 World Cup Cricket Championship for the Blind – 2012 ===
- The first ever T – 20 World Cup Cricket for the Blind was held from 1 to 13 December 2012 in Bangalore.
- Participating countries included Australia, Bangladesh, England, Pakistan, South Africa, West Indies, Sri Lanka, Nepal and India
- The brand ambassador was Shri Sourav Ganguly, former captain of the Indian cricket team
- The title sponsor was State Bank of India
- 36 matches were played between 2–11 December on a league cum knockout basis
- India and Pakistan contested the final on 13 December
- Team India emerged champions

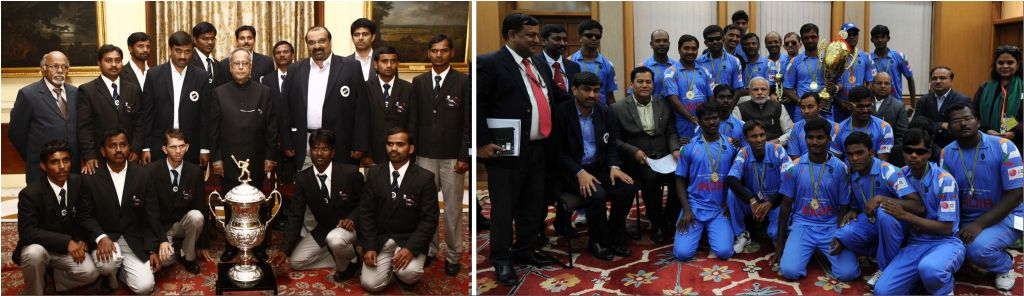
Winner s of T20 world cup 2012

=== Fourth One Day International World Cup Cricket Championship for the Blind – 2014 ===
- The 4th One Day World Cup was held in Cape Town, South Africa, from 27 November to 7 December 2014
- Participating countries included Sri Lanka, Bangladesh, South Africa, England, and Australia & India
- The Indian team comprising 17 players from 10 states in India, was led by Captain Shekhar Naik. The youngest player, simply called Golu, from Jharkhand, was 14 years old
- Team India successfully chased the stiff target of 389 runs set by Pakistan, defeating them in a pulsating climax
- The Indian Team was received at the airport by Shri Ananth Kumar, Minister of Chemicals and & Fertilizers, Shri Thawar Chand Gehlot, Minister of Social Justice & Empowerment and Shri Sarbananda Sonowal, Minister of Youth Affairs and Sports.
- The Prime Minister of India, Shri Narendra Modi, met the team at his official residence. Later in his radio address to the nation titled ‘Mann ki baat’, he portrayed the members of the blind cricket team as role models

=== First T20 Asia Cup Cricket Championship for the Blind – 2016 ===
- The first-ever T20 Asia Cup Cricket Championship for the Blind 2016, was held in Kochi, Kerala, India from 17 to 24 January 2016
- Participating countries included India Pakistan, Nepal, Bangladesh, Sri Lanka
- In all, 10 league matches were played between 8 and 22 January 2016
- The top two teams from the league matches, India & Pakistan, contested the finals played on 24 January 2016
- Chasing a massive target of 209 off 20 overs set by India, Pakistan crumbled to defeat with 163 off 18.4 overs
- The Indian team is now the only team to win all three International Championships including the T20 World Cup, ODI World Cup and T20 Asia Cup
- Congratulatory calls were received by the team from Mr Thawar Chand Gehlot, Minister for Social Justice & Empowerment and Mr Ananth Kumar, Union Minister for Chemicals & Fertilizers

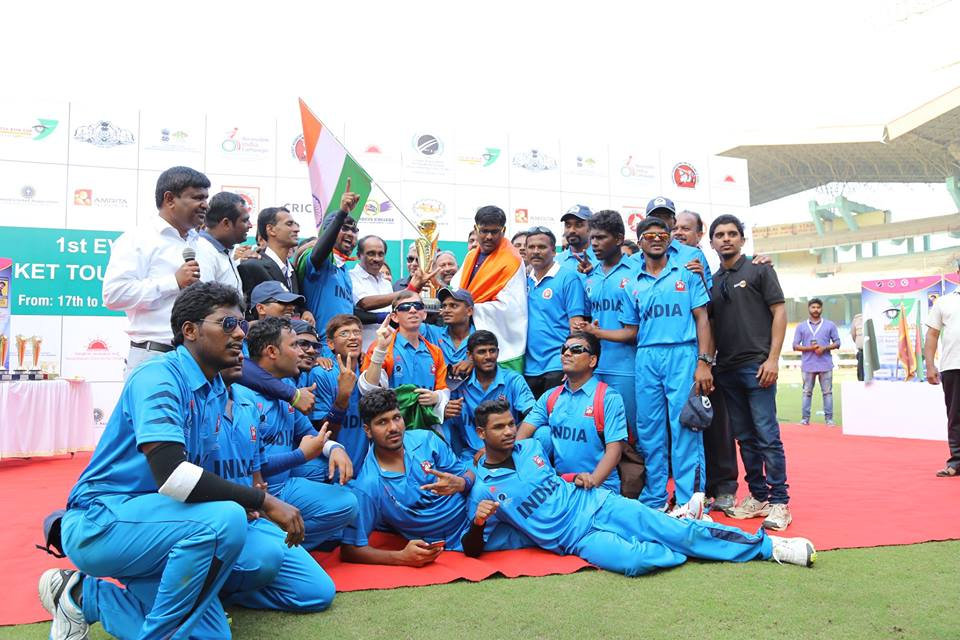

=== Second T20 World Cup Cricket Tournament for the Blind ===
CABI-Samarthanam is glad to announce the Second T–20 World Cup Cricket Tournament for the Blind which will be organized jointly by Cricket Association for the Blind in India (CABI) in association with Samarthanam from 28 January to 12 February 2017. The hosting rights for the World Cup were conferred to CABI by World Blind Cricket Ltd. (WBC) during the 17th Annual General Meeting of WBC held in Cape Town, South Africa on 25 November 2014.

In T-20 World Cup 2017, all major test-playing countries will be participating. Confirmed participating nations include Australia, Bangladesh, England, Nepal, New Zealand, Pakistan, South Africa, Sri Lanka and West Indies and the host, India. 48 Matches will be played including Semi finals and Finals, on league cum knockout basis in multi cities across India.

A grand opening ceremony will be held with a ceremonial march past by all the participating teams, followed by cultural events, celebrity appearances and dance performances by known artists. Over 40,000 people are expected to be a part of the inaugural ceremony. The event will greatly bolster the game of blind cricket and the cricketers.
