= D. B. Inamdar =

Former Karnataka minister

Danappagouda Basanagouda Inamdar

Minister of Information Technology

Member of the Karnataka Legislative Assembly
- In office 1983–1989
- Constituency: Kittur

Member of the Karnataka Legislative Assembly
- In office 1994–1999
- Constituency: Kittur

Member of the Karnataka Legislative Assembly
- In office 1999–2004
- Constituency: Kittur

Member of the Karnataka Legislative Assembly
- In office 2013–2018
- Constituency: Kittur

Personal details
- Born: Neginhal, Karnataka
- Died: 25 April 2023 Manipal Hospital, Bengaluru, Karnataka
- Party: Indian National Congress
- Other political affiliations: Janata Party
- Children: 2 sons, 1 daughter
- Parent: B.D. Inamdar

Danappagouda Basanagouda Inamdar was an Indian politician and a member of the Indian National Congress who served as the Minister of Information Technology for the state of Karnataka. Inamdar was elected to the Karnataka Legislative Assembly five times, representing the Kittur constituency in the elections of 1983, 1985, 1994, 1999, and 2013.

== Early life ==
Inamdar was from Neginhal village in Kittur taluk and was popularly known across the state as Kittur Dhani.

== Career ==
Inamdar contested the Karnataka Assembly elections from the Kittur constituency nine times, winning five of those contests. He was elected as a Janata Party candidate in 1983 and 1985 and as a Congress candidate in 1994, 1999, and 2013. He was defeated in 1989, 2004 (twice), and 2018 by Suresh Marihal and Mahantesh Doddagoudar, both of whom were considered his protégés.

== Death ==
Inamdar had expressed his intention to contest the assembly elections for another term and was preparing for it in the Kittur constituency. He participated in the Congress Praja Dhwani program held in Kittur on 3 March. However, his health deteriorated shortly afterward, and he was admitted to Manipal Hospital in Bengaluru on 8 March after he complained of uneasiness and difficulty in breathing.

His followers protested and urged the Congress leadership to award the ticket to his daughter-in-law, Laxmi Inamdar. However, the party chose Babasaheb Patil as its candidate, which upset the Inamdar family and their supporters, but they chose to remain silent as Inamdar's condition worsened. Inamdar had been receiving treatment for one month and died on a Tuesday morning in 2023. He is survived by two sons and a daughter.
