= Vishwanath Patil =

Indian politician

Member of the Karnataka Legislative Assembly
- In office 2013–2018
- Preceded by: Jagadish Metgud
- Succeeded by: Mahantesh Koujalagi
- Constituency: Bailhongal

Personal details
- Party: Bharatiya Janata Party
- Other political affiliations: Karnataka Janata Paksha

Vishwanath Patil is an Indian politician and member of the Bharatiya Janata Party. Patil was a member of the Karnataka Legislative Assembly from the Bailhongal Assembly constituency in Belgaum district on Karnataka Janata Paksha.
