= Bailhongal Assembly constituency =

Constituency of the Karnataka legislative assembly in India

Coordinates: 15.82°N 74.86°E

Bailhongal
- Constituency No. 16 for the Karnataka Legislative Assembly

Constituency details
- Country: India
- Region: South India
- State: Karnataka
- District: Belagavi
- Lok Sabha constituency: Belagavi
- Established: 1967
- Total electors: 195,828
- Reservation: None

Member of Legislative Assembly
- 16th Karnataka Legislative Assembly
- Incumbent Mahantesh Koujalagi
- Party: Indian National Congress
- Elected year: 2023
- Preceded by: Vishwanath Patil

Bailhongal Assembly constituency is one of the 225 constituencies in the Karnataka Legislative Assembly of Karnataka, a southern state of India. Bailhongal is also part of Belagavi Lok Sabha constituency.

== Members of the Legislative Assembly ==
Election	Member	Party
1952	Metgud Holibasappa Shivalingappa	Indian National Congress
1967	B. B. Annappa	Indian National Congress
1972	P. B. Arvbali Patil	Indian National Congress
1978	Balekundargi Ramalingappa Channabasappa	Indian National Congress
1983	Balekundargi Ramalingappa Channabasappa	Indian National Congress
1985	Koujalagi Shivanand Hemappa	Janata Party
1989	Koujalagi Shivanand Hemappa	Janata Dal
1994	Koujalagi Shivanand Hemappa	Janata Dal
1996 By-election	Koujatagi Mahantesh Shivanand	Janata Dal
1999	Koujatagi Mahantesh Shivanand	Janata Dal
2004	Jagadish Virupakshi C. Matgud	Bharatiya Janata Party
2008	Jagadish Virupakshi C. Matgud	Bharatiya Janata Party
2013	Dr. Vishwanath Patil	Karnataka Janata Paksha
2018	Koujatagi Mahantesh Shivanand	Indian National Congress
2023	Koujatagi Mahantesh Shivanand	Indian National Congress

== Election results ==
=== Assembly election 2023 ===
2023 Karnataka Legislative Assembly election: Bailhongal
Party	Candidate	Votes	%	±%
INC	Koujatagi Mahantesh Shivanand	58,408	38.28	▲5.79
BJP	Jagdish Channappa Metgud	55,630	36.46	▲10.56
Independent	Dr. Vishwanath Patil	25,060	16.42	New
JD(S)	Shankar. Bharamappa. Madalagi	9,427	6.18	▼3.18
AAP	Basanagouda. M. Chikkanagoudar	970	0.64	New
NOTA	None of the above	1,319	0.86	▼0.07
Margin of victory		2,778	1.82	▼1.72
Turnout		152,779	78.02	▼0.36
Total valid votes		152,596		
Registered electors		195,828		▲5.96
INC hold		Swing	▲5.79	

=== Assembly election 2018 ===
2018 Karnataka Legislative Assembly election: Bailhongal
Party	Candidate	Votes	%	±%
INC	Koujatagi Mahantesh Shivanand	47,040	32.49	▲4.07
Independent	Jagdish Channappa Metgud	41,918	28.95	New
BJP	Dr. Vishwanath Patil	37,498	25.90	▼3.35
JD(S)	Shankar. Bharamappa. Madalagi	13,548	9.36	▲1.89
Independent	Sunil. L. Guddakayu	1,767	1.22	New
AIMEP	Duragamma Basappa Yarazaravi	984	0.68	New
NOTA	None of the above	1,352	0.93	New
Margin of victory		5,122	3.54	▲0.68
Turnout		144,862	78.38	▲0.65
Total valid votes		144,800		
Registered electors		184,815		▲13.19
INC gain from KJP		Swing	▲0.38	

=== Assembly election 2013 ===
2013 Karnataka Legislative Assembly election: Bailhongal
Party	Candidate	Votes	%	±%
KJP	Dr. Vishwanath Patil	40,709	32.11	New
BJP	Jagadish. C. Metgud	37,088	29.25	▼17.60
INC	Basavaraj Shivanand Koujalgi	36,042	28.42	▼9.59
JD(S)	Shankar B. Madalagi	9,475	7.47	▼2.98
Independent	Madhav Venkatesh Kulkarni	1,746	1.38	New
BSP	Vittal Siddappa Harijan	975	0.77	▲0.02
SP	Dayanand. G. Chikkamath	762	0.60	New
Margin of victory		3,621	2.86	▼5.98
Turnout		126,913	77.73	▲5.96
Total valid votes		126,797		
Registered electors		163,273		▲11.73
KJP gain from BJP		Swing	▼14.74	

=== Assembly election 2008 ===
2008 Karnataka Legislative Assembly election: Bailhongal
Party	Candidate	Votes	%	±%
BJP	Jagadish Virupakshi C. Matgud	48,988	46.85	▼3.73
INC	Koujatagi Mahantesh Shivanand	39,748	38.01	▼0.43
JD(S)	Chandrashekhar Shivalingappa Sadhunavar	10,923	10.45	▲4.49
Independent	Balappa Somappa Chalakopp	1,608	1.54	New
LJP	Batagi Mallikarjun Huchchappa	1,017	0.97	New
BSP	Panchaksharayya Neelakanthayya Ganachari	786	0.75	New
Margin of victory		9,240	8.84	▼3.31
Turnout		104,874	71.77	▲4.81
Total valid votes		104,564		
Registered electors		146,129		▲2.61
BJP hold		Swing	▼3.73	

=== Assembly election 2004 ===
2004 Karnataka Legislative Assembly election: Bailhongal
Party	Candidate	Votes	%	±%
BJP	Jagadish Virupakshi C. Matgud	48,208	50.58	▲31.97
INC	Koujatagi Mahantesh Shivanand	36,633	38.44	▲14.44
JD(S)	Chandrashekhar Shivalingappa Sadhunavar	5,680	5.96	▲4.25
Kannada Nadu Party	Babu Mudakappa Mugabasav	1,941	2.04	New
JP	Ashfaqahmed Akbarsabhed Mirjannavar	1,446	1.52	New
Urs Samyuktha Paksha	Maruti Ningappa Tigadi	1,395	1.46	New
Margin of victory		11,575	12.15	▲5.60
Turnout		95,357	66.96	▼2.81
Total valid votes		95,303		
Registered electors		142,416		▲9.84
BJP gain from JD(U)		Swing	▲20.03	

=== Assembly election 1999 ===
1999 Karnataka Legislative Assembly election: Bailhongal
Party	Candidate	Votes	%	±%
JD(U)	Koujatagi Mahantesh Shivanand	25,856	30.55	New
INC	Sidnal Shanmukhappa Basappa	20,309	24.00	▲1.21
Independent	Balekundaragi Ramesh Chanabasappa	18,217	21.52	New
BJP	Virupakshappa Alias Jagadeesh Channappa Mategud	15,754	18.61	▲16.70
JD(S)	Chikkanagoudar Basanagouda Mallanagouda	1,444	1.71	New
Independent	Bolashetti Annappa Baburao	1,380	1.63	New
Independent	Balappa Somappa Chalakopp	991	1.17	New
Margin of victory		5,547	6.55	▼10.52
Turnout		90,456	69.77	▲10.66
Total valid votes		84,635		
Rejected ballots		5,803	6.42	▲4.59
Registered electors		129,653		▲4.57
JD(U) gain from JD		Swing	▼15.64	

=== Assembly by-election 1996 ===
1996 Karnataka Legislative Assembly by-election: Bailhongal
Party	Candidate	Votes	%	±%
JD	Koujatagi Mahantesh Shivanand	33,220	46.19	▼6.59
Independent	Bolasheeti Baburao Annappa	20,941	29.11	New
INC	Muragod Mallappa Gangappa	16,392	22.79	▲4.92
BJP	Shankarayya Shivalingayya Mallayyanavaramath	1,373	1.91	▼1.93
Margin of victory		12,279	17.07	▼17.84
Turnout		73,289	59.11	▼14.13
Total valid votes		71,926		
Rejected ballots		1,344	1.83	▼0.79
Registered electors		123,984		▲7.13
JD hold		Swing	▼6.59	

=== Assembly election 1994 ===
1994 Karnataka Legislative Assembly election: Bailhongal
Party	Candidate	Votes	%	±%
JD	Koujalagi Shivanand Hemappa	43,562	52.78	▲14.70
INC	Gadataranavar Shivabasappa Gangappa	14,751	17.87	▼17.84
INC	Annasaheb Bommanaik Patil	14,423	17.48	New
KRRS	Shekhappa Somappa Itagi	6,097	7.39	New
BJP	C. P. Patil	3,166	3.84	New
Margin of victory		28,811	34.91	▲32.54
Turnout		84,764	73.24	▲0.16
Total valid votes		82,532		
Rejected ballots		2,225	2.62	▼2.96
Registered electors		115,733		▲7.74
JD hold		Swing	▲14.70	

=== Assembly election 1989 ===
1989 Karnataka Legislative Assembly election: Bailhongal
Party	Candidate	Votes	%	±%
JD	Koujalagi Shivanand Hemappa	28,223	38.08	New
INC	Patil. P. B	26,464	35.71	▼5.64
Kranti Sabha	Mokahasi Rudrappa Veerappa	15,454	20.85	New
JP	Neelagar Basavaraj Ningappa	1,453	1.96	New
Independent	Makandar Abdul Buddesab	615	0.83	New
Independent	Kari Basavanatappa Maharudrappa	547	0.74	New
Independent	Neghinhai Nabisab Hajaratsab	543	0.73	New
Margin of victory		1,759	2.37	▼14.93
Turnout		78,496	73.08	▼4.01
Total valid votes		74,116		
Rejected ballots		4,380	5.58	▲3.61
Registered electors		107,415		▲30.28
JD gain from JP		Swing	▼20.57	

=== Assembly election 1985 ===
1985 Karnataka Legislative Assembly election: Bailhongal
Party	Candidate	Votes	%	±%
JP	Koujalagi Shivanand Hemappa	36,544	58.65	▲16.43
INC	Balekundargi Ramalingappa Channabasappa	25,766	41.35	▼15.09
Margin of victory		10,778	17.30	▲3.08
Turnout		63,559	77.09	▲4.46
Total valid votes		62,310		
Rejected ballots		1,249	1.97	▼0.82
Registered electors		82,447		▲6.12
JP gain from INC		Swing	▲2.21	

=== Assembly election 1983 ===
1983 Karnataka Legislative Assembly election: Bailhongal
Party	Candidate	Votes	%	±%
INC	Balekundargi Ramalingappa Channabasappa	30,957	56.44	▲15.93
JP	Deyannavar Veerappa Kallappa	23,159	42.22	▲23.50
Independent	Mulla Jalalbeg Subhanbeg	531	0.97	New
Margin of victory		7,798	14.22	▲11.75
Turnout		56,426	72.63	▼4.48
Total valid votes		54,854		
Rejected ballots		1,572	2.79	▼0.28
Registered electors		77,694		▲6.40
INC hold		Swing	▲15.93	

=== Assembly election 1978 ===
1978 Karnataka Legislative Assembly election: Bailhongal
Party	Candidate	Votes	%	±%
INC	Balekundargi Ramalingappa Channabasappa	22,110	40.51	▼7.42
INC(I)	Doddagoudar Basavantray Basalingappa	20,764	38.05	New
JP	Basavenneppa Dundappa Metgud	10,219	18.72	New
Independent	Patil Kallanagouda Hanamantgouda	850	1.56	New
Independent	Yettinamani Basappa Kalingappa	634	1.16	New
Margin of victory		1,346	2.47	▼1.67
Turnout		56,307	77.11	▲2.81
Total valid votes		54,577		
Rejected ballots		1,730	3.07	▲3.07
Registered electors		73,020		▲14.69
INC gain from INC(O)		Swing	▼11.56	

=== Assembly election 1972 ===
1972 Mysore State Legislative Assembly election: Bailhongal
Party	Candidate	Votes	%	±%
INC(O)	P. B. Arvbali Patil	23,655	52.07	New
INC	B. R. Chanabasappa	21,775	47.93	▼32.77
Margin of victory		1,880	4.14	▼57.26
Turnout		47,305	74.30	▲11.36
Total valid votes		45,430		
Registered electors		63,670		▲11.36
INC(O) gain from INC		Swing	▼28.63	

=== Assembly election 1967 ===
1967 Mysore State Legislative Assembly election: Bailhongal
Party	Candidate	Votes	%	±%
INC	B. B. Annappa	27,656	80.70	▲20.04
Independent	C. S. Irasangappa	6,614	19.30	New
Margin of victory		21,042	61.40	▲40.08
Turnout		35,983	62.94	▼4.17
Total valid votes		34,270		
Registered electors		57,174		▼2.28
INC hold		Swing	▲20.04	

=== Assembly election 1952 ===
1952 Bombay State Legislative Assembly election: Bailhongal
Party	Candidate	Votes	%	±%
INC	Metgud Holibasappa Shivalingappa	23,816	60.66	New
KMPP	Angadi Shanmukhappa Ningappa	15,447	39.34	New
Margin of victory		8,369	21.32	
Turnout		39,263	67.11	
Total valid votes		39,263		
Registered electors		58,506		
INC win (new seat)				

== See also ==
- Bailhongal
- Belagavi district
- List of constituencies of Karnataka Legislative Assembly
