= Suresh Marihal =

Former Karnataka Legislative Assembly member

Suresh Shivarudrappa Marihal

Member of the Karnataka Legislative Assembly
- In office 2004–2008
- Constituency: Kittur

Member of the Karnataka Legislative Assembly
- In office 2008–2013

Personal details
- Party: Bharatiya Janata Party
- Profession: Politician

Suresh Shivarudrappa Marihal is an Indian politician who has served as a Member of the Legislative Assembly in Karnataka.

== Career ==
Suresh was first elected to the Karnataka Legislative Assembly in 2004, representing the Kittur Assembly constituency. He defeated former Karnataka IT Minister and senior Congress leader B. D. Inamdar in this election. He was re-elected in 2008 under the Bharatiya Janata Party. In the 2013 elections, Marihal contested the Kittur seat again but lost to Inamdar.
