= Shankar Patil Munenakoppa =

Indian politician

Minister of Sugarcane Development & Sugar Government of Karnataka
- In office 4 August 2021 – 13 May 2023
- Chief Minister: Basavaraj Bommai
- Preceded by: M. T. B. Nagaraj

Minister of Handlooms & Textiles Government of Karnataka
- In office 4 August 2021 – 13 May 2023
- Chief Minister: Basavaraj Bommai
- Preceded by: Shrimant Patil

Chairman of Karnataka Urban Infrastructure Development & Finance Corporation
- In office 28 July 2020 – 28 July 2021
- Chief Minister: B. S. Yediyurappa

Political Secretary to the Chief Minister of Karnataka
- In office 18 August 2012 – 8 May 2013 Serving with K. Shivanagouda Naik
- Chief Minister: Jagadish Shettar

Member of Karnataka Legislative Assembly
- In office 2018 – 13 May 2023
- Preceded by: N. H. Konaraddi
- Constituency: Navalgund
- In office 2008–2013
- Preceded by: Dr. R. B. Shiriyannavar
- Succeeded by: N. H. Konaraddi
- Constituency: Navalgund

Personal details
- Born: 1 June 1969 (age 56) Amaragol, Mysore State, India
- Party: Bharatiya Janata Party
- Profession: Politician

Shankar Patil Munenakoppa is an Indian politician who is currently serving as the Minister of Textiles & Sugarcane in Karnataka since 4 August 2021. He is a two time member of Karnataka Legislative Assembly from Navalgund constituency in Dharwad district. He had lost 2013 elections by a margin of 2669 votes against N. H. Konaraddi of JDS. He also served as the political secretary to Jagadish Shettar during latter's tenure as the Chief Minister.
