= Navalgund Assembly constituency =

Legislative Assembly constituency in Karnataka State, India

Coordinates: 15.56°N 75.36°E

Navalgund
- Constituency No. 69 for the Karnataka Legislative Assembly

Constituency details
- Country: India
- Region: South India
- State: Karnataka
- District: Dharwad
- Lok Sabha constituency: Dharwad
- Established: 1956
- Total electors: 207,237
- Reservation: None

Member of Legislative Assembly
- 16th Karnataka Legislative Assembly
- Incumbent N. H. Konaraddi
- Party: Indian National Congress
- Elected year: 2023
- Preceded by: Shankar Patil Munenakoppa

Navalgund Assembly constituency is one of the 224 Legislative Assembly constituencies of Karnataka in India.

It is part of Dharwad district. As of 2023, its representative is N. H. Konaraddi of the Indian National Congress party.

== Members of the Legislative Assembly ==
Election	Member	Party
1957	Ramanagouda Marigouda Patil	Indian National Congress
1962	Ramanagouda Marigouda Patil	Indian National Congress
1967	Ramanagouda Marigouda Patil	Indian National Congress
1972	Kulkarni Mallappa Karaveerappa	Indian National Congress
1978	Patil Shankaragouda Virupakshagouda	Indian National Congress
1983	Kulkarni Mallappa Karaveerappa	Indian National Congress
1985	Kulkarni Mallappa Karaveerappa	Indian National Congress
1989	Kulkarni Mallappa Karaveerappa	Indian National Congress
1994	Gaddi Kallappa Nagappa	Karnataka Pradesh Congress Committee
1999	Gaddi Kallappa Nagappa	Indian National Congress
2004	Dr. Shiriyannavar	Bharatiya Janata Party
2008	Shankar Patil Munenakoppa	Bharatiya Janata Party
2013	N. H. Konaraddi	Janata Dal
2018	Shankar Patil Munenakoppa	Bharatiya Janata Party
2023	N. H. Konaraddi	Indian National Congress

== Election results ==
=== Assembly Election 2023 ===
2023 Karnataka Legislative Assembly election : Navalgund
Party	Candidate	Votes	%	±%
INC	N. H. Konaraddi	86,081	53.16	▲28.77
BJP	Shankar Patil Munenakoppa	63,882	39.45	▼1.74
JD(S)	Gaddi Kallappa Nagappa	6,914	4.27	▼24.06
Independent	Shankrappa Rudrappa Ambali	1,134	0.70	New
NOTA	None of the above	1,120	0.69	▼0.51
Margin of victory		22,199	13.71	▲0.85
Turnout		162,262	78.30	▲0.08
Total valid votes		161,914		
Registered electors		207,237		▲1.57
INC gain from BJP		Swing	▲11.97	

=== Assembly Election 2018 ===
2018 Karnataka Legislative Assembly election : Navalgund
Party	Candidate	Votes	%	±%
BJP	Shankar Patil Munenakoppa	65,718	41.19	▲8.93
JD(S)	N. H. Konaraddi	45,197	28.33	▼5.99
INC	Asuti Vinod Kashinath	38,906	24.39	▲0.62
Independent	Shivanand Basappa Karigar	4,555	2.85	New
NOTA	None of the above	1,914	1.20	New
Independent	Raghavendra Shankrappa Teradal	980	0.61	New
Margin of victory		20,521	12.86	▲10.80
Turnout		159,593	78.22	▲3.12
Total valid votes		159,546		
Registered electors		204,041		▲11.56
BJP gain from JD(S)		Swing	▲6.87	

=== Assembly Election 2013 ===
2013 Karnataka Legislative Assembly election : Navalgund
Party	Candidate	Votes	%	±%
JD(S)	N. H. Konaraddi	44,448	34.32	▲9.27
BJP	Shankar Patil Munenakoppa	41,779	32.26	▼8.67
INC	Gaddi Kallappa Nagappa	30,780	23.77	▼3.17
Independent	Shivanand Basappa Karigar (Mudnur)	8,901	6.87	New
KJP	Dr. Shiriyannavar	4,028	3.11	New
Independent	Subhashchandragouda Bhimanagouda Patil (Chandragouda)	2,356	1.82	New
BSRCP	Shambhulinga C. Sidramashettar	1,109	0.86	New
BSP	Saidapur Yellappa Dundur	935	0.72	▼0.56
Margin of victory		2,669	2.06	▼11.93
Turnout		137,360	75.10	▲5.47
Total valid votes		129,517		
Registered electors		182,898		▲5.35
JD(S) gain from BJP		Swing	▼6.61	

=== Assembly Election 2008 ===
2008 Karnataka Legislative Assembly election : Navalgund
Party	Candidate	Votes	%	±%
BJP	Shankar Patil Munenakoppa	49,436	40.93	▲6.04
INC	Gaddi Kallappa Nagappa	32,541	26.94	▼3.51
JD(S)	N. H. Konaraddi	30,263	25.05	▲9.66
Independent	Bentur Hanamaraddi Shivaraddi	2,284	1.89	New
BSP	Shankrappa Rudrappa Ambali	1,547	1.28	New
SP	Vijayakumar Ningappa Guddad	1,222	1.01	▲0.06
Independent	Badni Hemaraj Adiveppa	891	0.74	New
Rashtriya Hindustan Sena Karnataka	Veerayya Chandrashekharayya Sobarad	833	0.69	New
JD(U)	Navalgund Mallikarjun Neelappa	814	0.67	New
Margin of victory		16,895	13.99	▲9.55
Turnout		120,888	69.63	▲1.90
Total valid votes		120,795		
Registered electors		173,616		▲35.73
BJP hold		Swing	▲6.04	

=== Assembly Election 2004 ===
2004 Karnataka Legislative Assembly election : Navalgund
Party	Candidate	Votes	%	±%
BJP	Dr. Shiriyannavar	30,195	34.89	▲16.92
INC	Gaddi Kallappa Nagappa	26,356	30.45	▲3.81
JD(S)	N. H. Konaraddi	13,318	15.39	▲3.44
JP	Ashok Erappa Kusugal	10,444	12.07	New
Kannada Nadu Party	Kallur Shivashankar Channappa	3,089	3.57	New
Independent	Rangaswamy. R. D	999	1.15	New
SP	Chalavadi Gurushamappa Hanumappa	821	0.95	New
Urs Samyuktha Paksha	Pachangi Shivanand Laxman	770	0.89	New
Independent	Mundinamani. H. N	559	0.65	New
Margin of victory		3,839	4.44	▼4.22
Turnout		86,631	67.73	▼5.25
Total valid votes		86,551		
Registered electors		127,913		▲12.87
BJP gain from INC		Swing	▲8.25	

=== Assembly Election 1999 ===
1999 Karnataka Legislative Assembly election : Navalgund
Party	Candidate	Votes	%	±%
INC	Gaddi Kallappa Nagappa	20,396	26.64	▲11.06
BJP	Dr. Shiriyannavar	13,761	17.97	▲5.85
Independent	Ashok Erappa Kusugal	13,036	17.02	New
Independent	Desaigoudi Shankara Gouda Patil	10,021	13.09	New
JD(S)	Gangadar Math Basayya Basalingaiyya	9,149	11.95	New
Independent	Manami Basappa Kallappa	5,048	6.59	New
Independent	Shamashuddin. B. Kunnibhavi	4,035	5.27	New
Independent	Chulaki Shankarappa Fakirappa	1,032	1.35	New
Margin of victory		6,635	8.66	▲3.76
Turnout		82,713	72.98	▲6.64
Total valid votes		76,575		
Rejected ballots		6,099	7.37	▲4.19
Registered electors		113,331		▲6.47
INC gain from INC		Swing	▲6.16	

=== Assembly Election 1994 ===
1994 Karnataka Legislative Assembly election : Navalgund
Party	Candidate	Votes	%	±%
INC	Gaddi Kallappa Nagappa	13,998	20.48	New
INC	Kulkarni Mallappa Karaveerappa	10,650	15.58	▼27.22
JD	Ganiger Basappa Bharamappa	10,537	15.42	▼10.49
KRRS	Eshwarchandra Hosamani	8,678	12.70	New
Independent	Dr. Shiriyannavar Rajshekhar Basappa	8,667	12.68	New
BJP	Anand Hosagoudar	8,284	12.12	New
Independent	Khaji Abdulsattar Mahadabdulla	4,607	6.74	New
Independent	Ramappa Mallappa Yalavatti	518	0.76	New
Independent	Manjunathagouda Patil	415	0.61	New
Margin of victory		3,348	4.90	▼11.60
Turnout		70,613	66.34	▼0.21
Total valid votes		68,345		
Rejected ballots		2,245	3.18	▼3.85
Registered electors		106,441		▲3.54
INC gain from INC		Swing	▼22.32	

=== Assembly Election 1989 ===
1989 Karnataka Legislative Assembly election : Navalgund
Party	Candidate	Votes	%	±%
INC	Kulkarni Mallappa Karaveerappa	27,222	42.80	▼4.06
Kranti Sabha	Mankani Vijay Lingaraddi	16,729	26.30	New
JD	Kallannavar Chandrakantha Ningappa	16,484	25.91	New
JP	Desai Nemachandra Jinnappa	2,261	3.55	New
Margin of victory		10,493	16.50	▲15.56
Turnout		68,417	66.55	▲2.69
Total valid votes		63,610		
Rejected ballots		4,807	7.03	▲4.25
Registered electors		102,802		▲27.42
INC hold		Swing	▼4.06	

=== Assembly Election 1985 ===
1985 Karnataka Legislative Assembly election : Navalgund
Party	Candidate	Votes	%	±%
INC	Kulkarni Mallappa Karaveerappa	23,469	46.86	▼9.57
JP	Chandrakant Kallannavar	22,997	45.91	▲15.28
BJP	Eshwarchandra Hosamani	1,246	2.49	▼3.58
Independent	Goundanaikar Leelappa Sannakallappa	663	1.32	New
Independent	Mantur Kushuma Sheshappa	531	1.06	New
Independent	Sunagar Rudrappa Ballappa	423	0.84	New
Margin of victory		472	0.94	▼24.85
Turnout		51,520	63.86	▲3.44
Total valid votes		50,088		
Rejected ballots		1,432	2.78	▼0.47
Registered electors		80,679		▲4.26
INC hold		Swing	▼9.57	

=== Assembly Election 1983 ===
1983 Karnataka Legislative Assembly election : Navalgund
Party	Candidate	Votes	%	±%
INC	Kulkarni Mallappa Karaveerappa	25,524	56.43	▲39.11
JP	Desai Nemachandra Jinnappa	13,857	30.63	▼8.19
BJP	Neelappagoudar Channabasagouda Virupaxagouda	2,746	6.07	New
Independent	Bentur Hanamaraddi Shivaraddi	1,408	3.11	New
Independent	Kotturshettar Irappa Chanaveerappa	1,118	2.47	New
Independent	Nidavani Chanabasappa Holiyappa	364	0.80	New
Margin of victory		11,667	25.79	▲20.76
Turnout		46,753	60.42	▼15.15
Total valid votes		45,235		
Rejected ballots		1,518	3.25	▼0.01
Registered electors		77,379		▲8.70
INC gain from INC(I)		Swing	▲12.57	

=== Assembly Election 1978 ===
1978 Karnataka Legislative Assembly election : Navalgund
Party	Candidate	Votes	%	±%
INC(I)	Patil Shankaragouda Virupakshagouda	22,825	43.86	New
JP	Kulkarni Mallappa Karaveerappa	20,205	38.82	New
INC	Yavagal Basavaraddi Rangaraddi	9,014	17.32	▼28.98
Margin of victory		2,620	5.03	▲0.02
Turnout		53,798	75.57	▼2.38
Total valid votes		52,044		
Rejected ballots		1,754	3.26	▲3.26
Registered electors		71,189		▲26.81
INC(I) gain from INC(O)		Swing	▼7.45	

=== Assembly Election 1972 ===
1972 Mysore State Legislative Assembly election : Navalgund
Party	Candidate	Votes	%	±%
INC(O)	K. M. Karaveerappa	21,716	51.31	New
INC	R. M. Patil	19,594	46.30	▼28.34
ABJS	K. K. Basapa	1,013	2.39	▼0.59
Margin of victory		2,122	5.01	▼47.24
Turnout		43,761	77.95	▲1.38
Total valid votes		42,323		
Registered electors		56,138		▲15.82
INC(O) gain from INC		Swing	▼23.33	

=== Assembly Election 1967 ===
1967 Mysore State Legislative Assembly election : Navalgund
Party	Candidate	Votes	%	±%
INC	P. R. Marigouda	25,973	74.64	▲16.41
Independent	B. B. Mallaoppa	7,791	22.39	New
ABJS	K. M. Gurubasappa	1,036	2.98	New
Margin of victory		18,182	52.25	▲31.25
Turnout		37,113	76.57	▲6.96
Total valid votes		34,800		
Registered electors		48,471		▼12.18
INC hold		Swing	▲16.41	

=== Assembly Election 1962 ===
1962 Mysore State Legislative Assembly election : Navalgund
Party	Candidate	Votes	%	±%
INC	Ramanagouda Marigouda Patil	20,618	58.23	▼11.24
Independent	Mallappa Kariveerappa Kulkarni	13,183	37.23	New
ABJS	Ramdas Annabhat Joshi	1,607	4.54	New
Margin of victory		7,435	21.00	▼17.95
Turnout		38,422	69.61	▲9.32
Total valid votes		35,408		
Registered electors		55,196		▲6.07
INC hold		Swing	▼11.24	

=== Assembly Election 1957 ===
1957 Mysore State Legislative Assembly election : Navalgund
Party	Candidate	Votes	%	±%
INC	Ramanagouda Marigouda Patil	21,798	69.47	New
Independent	Koyppanvar Malleshappa Neelappa	9,578	30.53	New
Margin of victory		12,220	38.95	
Turnout		31,376	60.29	
Total valid votes		31,376		
Registered electors		52,038		
INC win (new seat)				

== See also ==
- List of constituencies of the Karnataka Legislative Assembly
- Dharwad district
