= Mahantesh Koujalagi =

Indian politician

Member of the Karnataka Legislative Assembly
- Incumbent
- Assumed office 2018
- Preceded by: Vishwanath Patil
- Constituency: Bailhongal
- In office 1996–2004
- Preceded by: Shivananda Koujalagi
- Succeeded by: Jagadish Metgud
- Constituency: Bailhongal

Personal details
- Political party: Indian National Congress
- Parent: Shivananda Koujalagi

Mahantesh Koujalagi is an Indian politician and member of the Indian National Congress. He is a member of the Karnataka Legislative Assembly from the Bailhongal in Belgaum district.

He was appointed chairman for Karnataka State Financial Corporation (KSFC) 26 January 2024.
