= Neginhal =

- Village
- Location in Karnataka, India Neginhal (India)
- Coordinates: 15.79°N 74.75°E
- Country: India
- State: Karnataka
- District: Belgaum
- Talukas: Bailhongal

Population (2001)
  - Total: 6,813

Languages
  - Official: Kannada
- Time zone: UTC+5:30 (IST)

Neginhal is a village in the state of Karnataka, India. It is located in the Bailhongal taluk of Belgaum district in Karnataka.

== Demographics ==
As of 2001 India census, Neginhal had a population of 6,813 with 3,435 males and 3,378 females.

== Notable people ==
- B. D. Inamdar, politician

== See also ==
- Belgaum
- Districts of Karnataka
