= Kittur Assembly constituency =

Legislative Assembly constituency in Karnataka State, India

Coordinates: 15.6°N 74.79°E

Kittur
- Constituency No. 15 for the Karnataka Legislative Assembly

Constituency details
- Country: India
- Region: South India
- State: Karnataka
- District: Belgaum
- Lok Sabha constituency: Uttara Kannada
- Established: 1967
- Total electors: 195,886
- Reservation: None

Member of Legislative Assembly
- 16th Karnataka Legislative Assembly
- Incumbent Babasaheb Patil
- Party: Indian National Congress
- Elected year: 2023
- Preceded by: Mahantesh Doddagoudar

Kittur Assembly constituency is one of the 224 Legislative Assembly constituencies of Karnataka in India. It is part of Belgaum district.

== Members of the Legislative Assembly ==
Election	Member	Party
1967	S. B. Mallappa	Indian National Congress
1972	D. B. Inamdar	Indian National Congress
1978	Arawalli Patil Parvatgouda Basangouda	Janata Party
1983	D. B. Inamdar	Janata Party
1985	D. B. Inamdar	Janata Party
1989	Babagouda Patil	Kranti Sabha
1994	D. B. Inamdar	Indian National Congress
1999	D. B. Inamdar	Indian National Congress
2004	Suresh Shivarudrappa Marihal	Bharatiya Janata Party
2008	Suresh Shivarudrappa Marihal	Bharatiya Janata Party
2013	D. B. Inamdar	Indian National Congress
2018	Mahantesh Doddagoudar	Bharatiya Janata Party
2023	Babasaheb Patil	Indian National Congress

== Election results ==
=== Assembly Election 2023 ===
2023 Karnataka Legislative Assembly election : Kittur
Party	Candidate	Votes	%	±%
INC	Babasaheb Patil	77,536	49.49%	▲22.36
BJP	Mahantesh Doddagoudar	74,543	47.58%	▼1.68
NOTA	None of the above	802	0.51%	▼0.47
Margin of victory		2,993	1.91%	▼20.22
Turnout		156,824	80.06%	▲1.38
Total valid votes		156,660		
Registered electors		195,886		▲3.69
INC gain from BJP		Swing	▲0.23	

=== Assembly Election 2018 ===
2018 Karnataka Legislative Assembly election : Kittur
Party	Candidate	Votes	%	±%
BJP	Mahantesh Doddagoudar	73,155	49.26%	▲20.97
INC	D. B. Inamdar	40,293	27.13%	▼15.68
Independent	Babasaheb Patil	25,366	17.08%	New
JD(S)	Suresh Shivarudrappa Marihal	3,755	2.53%	▼13.87
NOTA	None of the above	1,456	0.98%	New
Independent	Raghavendra Vilas Naik	1,137	0.77%	New
Margin of victory		32,862	22.13%	▲7.61
Turnout		148,637	78.68%	▲3.07
Total valid votes		148,512		
Registered electors		188,915		▲13.33
BJP gain from INC		Swing	▲6.45	

=== Assembly Election 2013 ===
2013 Karnataka Legislative Assembly election : Kittur
Party	Candidate	Votes	%	±%
INC	D. B. Inamdar	53,924	42.81%	▲3.23
BJP	Suresh Shivarudrappa Marihal	35,634	28.29%	▼15.19
JD(S)	Anand Balakrishna Appugol	20,657	16.40%	▲8.11
KJP	Babugouda Chintamanigouda Patil	6,850	5.44%	New
Independent	Mahesh Ningappa Hudali	1,735	1.38%	New
Independent	Badiger Chandrashekar Madiwalappa	1,274	1.01%	New
BSP	Yamanappa Gangappa Talawar	1,142	0.91%	▼0.32
SKP	Basavaraj Rudrappa Mokhashi	1,089	0.86%	New
Independent	Annappa Marathe	932	0.74%	New
Margin of victory		18,290	14.52%	▲10.61
Turnout		126,034	75.61%	▲1.01
Total valid votes		125,970		
Registered electors		166,697		▲11.28
INC gain from BJP		Swing	▼0.67	

=== Assembly Election 2008 ===
2008 Karnataka Legislative Assembly election : Kittur
Party	Candidate	Votes	%	±%
BJP	Suresh Shivarudrappa Marihal	48,581	43.48%	▼3.56
INC	D. B. Inamdar	44,216	39.58%	▲6.39
JD(S)	Veeranagouda Vasanagouda Patil	9,266	8.29%	▼0.78
Independent	Dodagoudar Sanagoud Fakeeragoud	4,246	3.80%	New
Independent	Hotakar Mahantesh Krishna	2,167	1.94%	New
BSP	Prakash Rama Nayak	1,377	1.23%	New
SP	Ashok Gurusdiiddappa Halaki	969	0.87%	New
LJP	Yallappa Balappa Satyanaik	903	0.81%	New
Margin of victory		4,365	3.91%	▼9.93
Turnout		111,755	74.60%	▲2.25
Total valid votes		111,725		
Registered electors		149,797		▲2.01
BJP hold		Swing	▼3.56	

=== Assembly Election 2004 ===
2004 Karnataka Legislative Assembly election : Kittur
Party	Candidate	Votes	%	±%
BJP	Suresh Shivarudrappa Marihal	49,970	47.04%	▲4.83
INC	D. B. Inamdar	35,265	33.19%	▼21.01
JD(S)	Veeranagouda Vasanagouda Patil	9,633	9.07%	▲6.30
Kannada Nadu Party	Sidnal Shivakant Shanmukhappa	8,218	7.74%	New
JP	Shylaja Suresh Sakrennavar	1,721	1.62%	New
Urs Samyuktha Paksha	Abdul Mansoor Murtuja Syed	1,432	1.35%	New
Margin of victory		14,705	13.84%	▲1.86
Turnout		106,243	72.35%	▼2.57
Total valid votes		106,239		
Registered electors		146,848		▲8.65
BJP gain from INC		Swing	▼7.16	

=== Assembly Election 1999 ===
1999 Karnataka Legislative Assembly election : Kittur
Party	Candidate	Votes	%	±%
INC	D. B. Inamdar	53,051	54.20%	▲15.59
BJP	Viraktayya Shivabasayya Salimath	41,321	42.21%	▲32.96
JD(S)	Balappa Malappa Budihal	2,715	2.77%	New
Independent	Mirjannavar Asfak Ahmed Akabarsaheb	611	0.62%	New
Margin of victory		11,730	11.98%	▲3.66
Turnout		101,256	74.92%	▼2.13
Total valid votes		97,889		
Rejected ballots		3,331	3.29%	▲0.90
Registered electors		135,152		▲10.24
INC hold		Swing	▲15.59	

=== Assembly Election 1994 ===
1994 Karnataka Legislative Assembly election : Kittur
Party	Candidate	Votes	%	±%
INC	D. B. Inamdar	35,600	38.61%	▲16.97
KRRS	Babagouda Patil	27,924	30.28%	New
JD	Dodagouda Shivanagouda Patil	13,100	14.21%	▼14.74
BJP	Babusaheb Balasaheb Desai	8,533	9.25%	New
INC	Killedar Shivaputrappa Maharudrappa	5,561	6.03%	New
Independent	Hunashikatti Najeerahmed Ameersab	804	0.87%	New
Independent	Pattar Chandrashekhar Shedeppa	690	0.75%	New
Margin of victory		7,676	8.32%	▼9.02
Turnout		94,467	77.05%	▼1.11
Total valid votes		92,212		
Rejected ballots		2,255	2.39%	▼1.34
Registered electors		122,597		▲6.57
INC gain from Kranti Sabha		Swing	▼7.68	

=== Assembly Election 1989 ===
1989 Karnataka Legislative Assembly election : Kittur
Party	Candidate	Votes	%	±%
Kranti Sabha	Babagouda Patil	40,071	46.29%	New
JD	D. B. Inamdar	25,058	28.95%	New
INC	Sarojadevi Basavraj Marihal	18,733	21.64%	▼24.07
JP	Bhadrannavar Chanabasappa Neelakanthappa	1,319	1.52%	New
Margin of victory		15,013	17.34%	▲11.79
Turnout		89,922	78.16%	▼1.52
Total valid votes		86,568		
Rejected ballots		3,354	3.73%	▲1.57
Registered electors		115,042		▲31.66
Kranti Sabha gain from JP		Swing	▼4.97	

=== Assembly Election 1985 ===
1985 Karnataka Legislative Assembly election : Kittur
Party	Candidate	Votes	%	±%
JP	D. B. Inamdar	34,921	51.26%	▼4.80
INC	Doddadouder Basavantaray Basalingappa	31,138	45.71%	▲5.68
Independent	Edalli Parappa Rudrappa	499	0.73%	New
Independent	Huddar Yallappa Fakirappa	483	0.71%	New
Independent	Nagangouda Chanagouda Rudragouda	423	0.62%	New
Margin of victory		3,783	5.55%	▼10.48
Turnout		69,628	79.68%	▲2.57
Total valid votes		68,122		
Rejected ballots		1,506	2.16%	▼0.56
Registered electors		87,380		▲5.39
JP hold		Swing	▼4.80	

=== Assembly Election 1983 ===
1983 Karnataka Legislative Assembly election : Kittur
Party	Candidate	Votes	%	±%
JP	D. B. Inamdar	34,866	56.06%	▲5.06
INC	Naghnoor Mugatsaheb Nabisahab	24,894	40.03%	New
Independent	Gadag Yallappa Fakirappa	1,434	2.31%	New
Independent	Tavagamath Madadewayya Basavanneyya	997	1.60%	New
Margin of victory		9,972	16.03%	▲14.02
Turnout		63,927	77.11%	▲3.32
Total valid votes		62,191		
Rejected ballots		1,736	2.72%	▼0.36
Registered electors		82,908		▲5.83
JP hold		Swing	▲5.06	

=== Assembly Election 1978 ===
1978 Karnataka Legislative Assembly election : Kittur
Party	Candidate	Votes	%	±%
JP	Arawalli Patil Parvatgouda Basangouda	28,575	51.00%	New
INC(I)	Tonni Shivaputrappa Gurupadappa	27,449	49.00%	New
Margin of victory		1,126	2.01%	▼7.35
Turnout		57,804	73.79%	▼5.08
Total valid votes		56,024		
Rejected ballots		1,780	3.08%	▲3.08
Registered electors		78,339		▲20.06
JP gain from INC(O)		Swing	▼3.68	

=== Assembly Election 1972 ===
1972 Mysore State Legislative Assembly election : Kittur
Party	Candidate	Votes	%	±%
INC(O)	D. B. Inamdar	27,299	54.68%	New
INC	S. S. Basappa	22,625	45.32%	▼41.61
Margin of victory		4,674	9.36%	▼65.46
Turnout		51,464	78.87%	▲16.09
Total valid votes		49,924		
Registered electors		65,248		▲9.81
INC(O) gain from INC		Swing	▼32.25	

=== Assembly Election 1967 ===
1967 Mysore State Legislative Assembly election : Kittur
Party	Candidate	Votes	%	±%
INC	S. B. Mallappa	31,281	86.93%	New
Independent	Y. B. Shantalingappa	4,357	12.11%	New
Independent	P. S. Veerangouda	346	0.96%	New
Margin of victory		26,924	74.82%	
Turnout		37,304	62.78%	
Total valid votes		35,984		
Registered electors		59,421		
INC win (new seat)				

== See also ==
- List of constituencies of the Karnataka Legislative Assembly
- Belgaum district
