= Ashok Pattan =

Indian politician

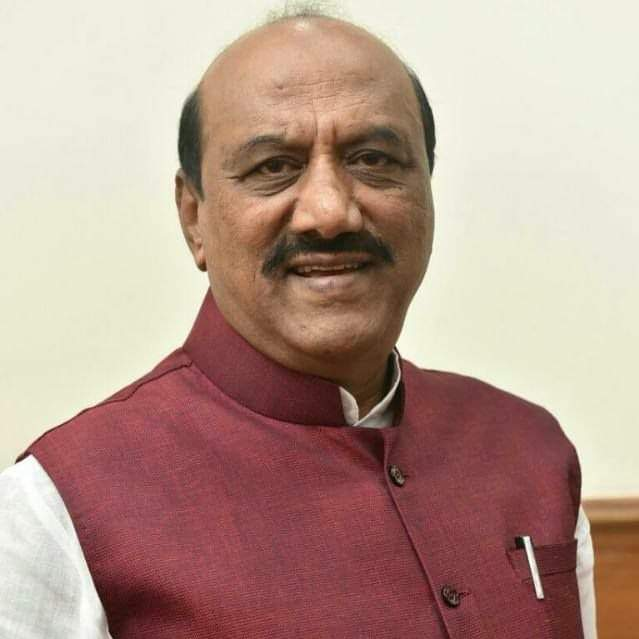

Member of the Karnataka Legislative Assembly
- Incumbent
- Assumed office 2023
- Preceded by: Mahadevappa Yadawad
- Constituency: Ramdurg
- In office 2008–2018
- Preceded by: Mahadevappa Yadawad
- Succeeded by: Mahadevappa Yadawad
- Constituency: Ramdurg

Personal details
- Party: Indian National Congress

Ashok Mahadevappa Pattan (born 1951) is an Indian politician from Karnataka. He is a member of the Indian National Congress. He is currently serving as member of the Karnataka Legislative Assembly from the Ramdurg Assembly constituency in Belgaum district.

== Early life and education ==
Pattan is from Ramdurg, Belgaum district. He is born to Sharadamma and Mahadevappa C. Pattan, who was a former MLA from Ramdurg. His father, a freedom fighter, lived for 107 years. He has two sisters, Mrunalini Siddaramappa, Madhumati Basavaraj. He completed his graduation in 1982 from APS College in Basavanagudi, Bangalore.

== Career ==
Pattan won from Ramdurga Assembly constituency representing Indian National Congress in the 2023 Karnataka Legislative Assembly election. He polled 80,294 votes and defeated his nearest rival, Chikka Revanna of Bharatiya Janata Party, by a margin of 11,730 votes. He won as an MLA for the first time in the 2008 Karntaka Legislative Assembly election from Ramdurg seat on Congress ticket polling 49,246 votes to defeat Mahadevappa Yadawad of Bharatiya Janata Party by a narrow margin of 384 votes. He retained it in the next election winning the 2013 Karnataka Legislative Assembly election. In 2013, he polled 42,310 votes and defeated his nearest rival Mahadevappa Shivalingappa Yadawad, of BJP, by a margin of 4,984 votes.
