= Babasaheb Patil =

Indian politician

Babasaheb Devanagouda Patil

Member of the Karnataka Legislative Assembly
- Incumbent
- Assumed office 2023
- Preceded by: Mahantesh Doddagoudar
- Constituency: Kittur

Personal details
- Born: Karnataka, India
- Party: Indian National Congress
- Parent: Devanagouda Patil

Babasaheb Patil is an Indian politician from Karnataka. He serves as member of Karnataka Legislative Assembly representing Kittur. He belongs to the Indian National Congress.
