= 1989 Karnataka Legislative Assembly election =

- 24 November 1989

All 224 seats of the Karnataka Legislative Assembly 113 seats needed for a majority
- Turnout: 67.57 pp
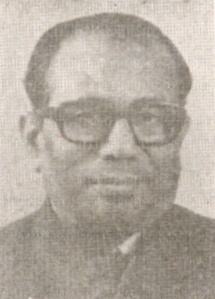

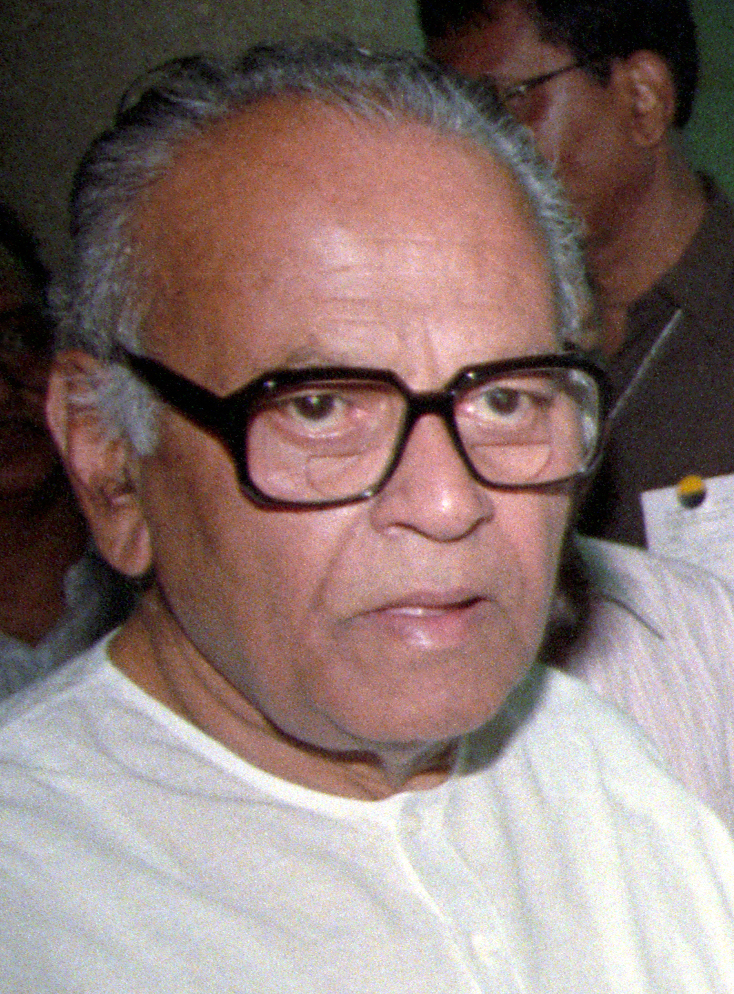
	Majority party	Minority party
Leader	Veerendra Patil	S. R. Bommai
Party	INC	JD
Leader's seat	Chincholi	Hubli Rural (lost)
Last election	65	Party did not exist
Seats won	178	24
Seat change	▲113	▲24
Popular vote	7,990,142	4,943,854
Percentage	43.76%	27.08%
Swing	▲2.94 pp	▲27.08 pp
- Map of the Karnataka Legislative Assembly after the election
Chief Minister before election
President's rule
Elected Chief Minister
Veerendra Patil
INC

The 1989 Karnataka Legislative Assembly election was held on 24 November 1989 in the Indian state of Karnataka to elect 224 members of the Karnataka Legislative Assembly. The Indian National Congress came back to power with a huge majority.

== Results ==
Parties and coalitions	Popular vote			Seats		
Parties and coalitions	Votes	%	±pp	Contested	Won	+/−
Indian National Congress	79,90,142	43.76	▲2.94	221	178	▲113
Janata Dal	49,43,854	27.08	▲27.08	209	24	▲24
Bharatiya Janata Party	7,55,032	4.14	▲0.26	118	4	▲2
Janata Party	20,70,341	11.34	▼32.26	217	2	▼137
Independents (IND)	14,82,482	8.12	▼1.35	1,088	12	▼1
Other	10,16,058	5.56	▲3.33	190	4	▼3
Total	1,82,57,909	100.00		2,043	224	±0
Valid votes	1,82,57,909	94.40				
Invalid votes	10,82,133	5.60				
Votes cast / turnout	1,93,40,042	67.57				
Abstentions	92,83,971	32.43				
Registered voters	2,86,24,013					

=== District wise results ===
District	Seats						
District	Seats	INC	JND	BJP	JNP	IND	OTH
Bidar	6	2	2	1	—N/a	1	—N/a
Gulbarga	13	12	—N/a	—N/a	—N/a	—N/a	1
Raichur	11	5	3	—N/a	—N/a	3	—N/a
Bellary	9	8	1	—N/a	—N/a	—N/a	—N/a
Chitradurga	11	9	1	—N/a	—N/a	1	—N/a
Tumkur	13	11	1	—N/a	—N/a	1	—N/a
Kolar	12	9	1	—N/a	1	—N/a	1
Bangalore	25	21	4	—N/a	—N/a	—N/a	—N/a
Mandya	9	8	—N/a	—N/a	—N/a	1	—N/a
Mysore	16	14	—N/a	—N/a	1	1	—N/a
Kodagu	3	3	—N/a	—N/a	—N/a	—N/a	—N/a
Hassan	8	8	—N/a	—N/a	—N/a	—N/a	—N/a
Dakshina Kannada	15	14	—N/a	1	—N/a	—N/a	—N/a
Chikmagalur	6	6	—N/a	—N/a	—N/a	—N/a	—N/a
Shimoga	10	7	1	2	—N/a	—N/a	—N/a
Uttara Kannada	6	5	1	—N/a	—N/a	—N/a	—N/a
Dharwad	18	15	2	—N/a	—N/a	—N/a	1
Belagavi	18	10	3	—N/a	—N/a	4	1
Bijapur	15	11	4	—N/a	—N/a	—N/a	—N/a
Total	224	178	24	4	2	12	4

=== Results by constituency ===
District	Constituency		Turnout	Winner				Runner-up				Margin
District	No.	Name	%	Candidate	Party	Votes	%	Candidate	Party	Votes	%	Margin
Bidar	1	Aurad	62.95	Gurupadappa Nagamarapalli	JD	35,508	43.75	Bapurao Patil	Ind	20,994	25.87	14,514
Bidar	2	Bhalki	64.73	Vijaykumar Khandre	Ind	32,445	47.69	Vijay Kanji	JD	20,438	30.04	12,007
Bidar	3	Hulsoor	51.95	Mahendra Kallappa	INC	16,709	29.63	Manik Pranjape	JD	15,842	28.09	867
Bidar	4	Bidar	56.04	Narayan Rao	BJP	24,922	31.80	Mohd Burhanuddin	INC	23,330	29.77	1,592
Bidar	5	Humnabad	61.34	Basavaraj Havgiappa Patil	INC	29,610	42.18	Basheeruddin Yousufoddin	JD	20,801	29.63	8,809
Bidar	6	Basavakalyan	63.09	Basavaraj Patil Attur	JD	32,404	41.15	Marutirao Muley	INC	29,705	37.72	2,699
Gulbarga	7	Chincholi	67.06	Veerendra Patil	INC	29,762	40.98	Vaijnath Patil	JP	27,717	38.16	2,045
Gulbarga	8	Kamalapur	52.88	G. Ramkrishna	INC	19,496	37.28	Vithal Doddamani	Ind	14,159	27.07	5,337
Gulbarga	9	Aland	61.55	Sharnabassappa Patil	INC	28,375	46.48	Basawaraj Malkajappa	JD	18,596	30.46	9,779
Gulbarga	10	Gulbarga	68.89	Qamar ul Islam	AIML	55,801	43.15	S. K. Kanta	JD	51,204	39.60	4,597
Gulbarga	11	Shahabad	52.91	Baburao Chavhan	INC	26,189	38.67	Gurunath Chandram	JP	19,104	28.21	7,085
Gulbarga	12	Afzalpur	61.39	Malikayya Guttedar	INC	38,810	55.57	Goudappa Rao	JP	25,964	37.17	12,846
Gulbarga	13	Chittapur	60.19	Baburao Chinchansur	INC	30,786	50.38	Vishawanath Patil	JP	19,717	32.27	11,069
Gulbarga	14	Sedam	63.85	Basavanathareddy Motakpalli	INC	39,641	56.44	Chandrashekhar Deshmukh	JD	20,925	29.79	18,716
Gulbarga	15	Jevargi	56.25	Dharam Singh	INC	30,751	47.13	Appasaheb Patil	JP	19,087	29.25	11,664
Gulbarga	16	Gurmitkal	58.43	Mallikarjun Kharge	INC	39,608	64.23	Arvind Guruji	JD	19,639	31.85	19,969
Gulbarga	17	Yadgir	56.33	Malakaraddy Lakshmareddy	INC	36,053	59.65	Sadsivreddy	JP	16,238	26.87	19,815
Gulbarga	18	Shahapur	57.28	Shivashekharappagouda Sirwal	INC	35,067	48.41	Ningangouda Hadnoor	JP	15,982	22.06	19,085
Gulbarga	19	Shorapur	59.26	Raja Nayak	INC	30,545	40.41	Shivanna Mangihal	JP	18,156	24.02	12,389
Raichur	20	Devadurga	44.44	B. Shivanna	INC	21,705	47.98	Chandrakanth	JP	9,644	21.32	12,061
Raichur	21	Raichur	45.39	M. S. Patil	JD	22,818	42.12	Mohammed Omer	INC	19,692	36.35	3,126
Raichur	22	Kalmala	53.76	K. Bheemanna	Ind	20,094	32.69	B. Muniyappa	JD	19,909	32.39	185
Raichur	23	Manvi	56.45	Basangouda Amaregouda	Ind	23,500	40.49	S. B. Amarkhed	INC	17,998	31.01	5,502
Raichur	24	Lingsugur	57.09	Raja Amareshwara Naik	INC	28,450	45.11	M. A. Patil	JD	25,051	39.72	3,399
Raichur	25	Sindhanur	66.27	Hampanagouda Badarli	JD	59,285	59.76	R. Narayanappa	INC	30,940	31.19	28,345
Raichur	26	Kushtagi	63.87	Hanamagouda Sekhkargouda	INC	36,246	48.49	K. Sharanappa	JD	33,847	45.28	2,399
Raichur	27	Yelburga	67.44	Basavaraj Rayareddy	JD	37,692	50.63	Shivasharanappa Patil	INC	35,271	47.37	2,421
Raichur	28	Kanakagiri	61.81	M. Mallikarjuna	INC	39,812	54.05	Nagappa	JD	30,279	41.11	9,533
Raichur	29	Gangawati	63.57	Srirangadevarayalu	INC	50,174	63.46	Gouli Mahadevappa	JD	22,125	27.98	28,049
Raichur	30	Koppal	66.75	Mallikarajun Diwatar	Ind	32,163	43.45	Shantanna Mudgal	INC	24,334	32.87	7,829
Bellary	31	Siruguppa	65.71	M. Shankar Reddy	INC	53,324	55.71	T. M. Chandrasekharayya	JD	38,967	40.71	14,357
Bellary	32	Kurugodu	65.44	Allum Veerabhadrappa	INC	43,189	52.66	B. Shivarama Reddy	JD	28,640	34.92	14,549
Bellary	33	Bellary	53.40	M. Ramappa	INC	26,802	34.81	Pannaraj	Ind	21,869	28.40	4,933
Bellary	34	Hospet	65.19	Gujjala Hanumanthappa	JD	63,805	63.80	H. Abdul Wahab	INC	31,603	31.60	32,202
Bellary	35	Sandur	67.54	M. Y. Ghorpade	INC	42,475	58.19	Ayyalu Thimmappa	JD	27,605	37.82	14,870
Bellary	36	Kudligi	71.19	N. T. Bommanna	INC	36,728	47.76	N. M. Nabisahib	JD	28,561	37.14	8,167
Bellary	37	Kottur	71.93	K. V. Ravindranath Babu	INC	34,161	45.07	H. Chidanandappa	JD	27,145	35.81	7,016
Bellary	38	Hoovina Hadagali	74.67	E. T. Shambunatha	INC	42,518	49.28	M. P. Prakash	JD	39,989	46.35	2,529
Bellary	39	Harapanahalli	68.65	B. H. Yanka Naik	INC	36,818	50.13	R. Chandra Naik	JD	32,492	44.24	4,326
Chitradurga	40	Harihar	67.78	Y. Nagappa	INC	41,513	44.37	Harish Basavanagouda	JD	24,439	26.12	17,074
Chitradurga	41	Davanagere	54.03	Y. M. Veeranna	INC	44,167	49.65	Pampapathi	CPI	21,408	24.07	22,759
Chitradurga	42	Mayakonda	67.96	Nagamma C. Keshavamurty	INC	31,869	36.72	K. Mallappa	JD	21,141	24.36	10,728
Chitradurga	43	Bharamasagara	66.07	K. Shiva Murthy	INC	36,103	49.24	M. Chandrappa	JD	27,330	37.27	8,773
Chitradurga	44	Chitradurga	62.11	H. Ekanthaiah	JD	31,923	38.53	C. M. Noorullasharief	INC	31,313	37.79	610
Chitradurga	45	Jagalur	72.78	G. H. Ashwath Reddy	INC	45,085	52.95	M. Basappa	JD	37,068	43.54	8,017
Chitradurga	46	Molakalmuru	69.70	N. G. Naik	INC	40,802	50.86	Purna Muthappa	JD	23,188	28.91	17,614
Chitradurga	47	Challakere	64.52	N. Jayanna	INC	32,274	40.75	Thippeswamy	JP	19,426	24.53	12,848
Chitradurga	48	Hiriyur	61.65	K. H. Ranganath	INC	33,717	43.62	B. Basappa	JD	21,479	27.79	12,238
Chitradurga	49	Holalkere	70.38	A. V. Umapathy	INC	45,978	54.62	G. Shivalingappa	JD	33,056	39.27	12,922
Chitradurga	50	Hosadurga	76.48	E. Vijayakumar	Ind	41,703	44.84	B. S. Dyamappa	Ind	18,615	20.02	23,088
Tumkur	51	Pavagada	66.54	Venkataramanappa	INC	45,626	52.19	Thippeswamy	JP	20,863	23.86	24,763
Tumkur	52	Sira	68.53	S. K. Dasappa	INC	29,699	39.31	B. Satya Narayana	JD	22,146	29.31	7,553
Tumkur	53	Kallambella	72.76	T. B. Jayachandra	Ind	37,844	50.23	B. Ganganna	JD	14,089	18.70	23,755
Tumkur	54	Bellavi	70.34	R. Narayana	INC	32,846	41.64	C. N. Bhaskarappa	JD	14,560	18.46	18,286
Tumkur	55	Madhugiri	72.29	G. Parameswara	INC	47,477	52.16	Rajavardhan	JD	29,670	32.59	17,807
Tumkur	56	Koratagere	74.16	C. Veerabhadraiah	INC	35,684	37.84	C. Veeranna	JD	32,044	33.98	3,640
Tumkur	57	Tumkur	64.75	S. Shafi Ahmed	INC	44,786	43.93	Lakshmi Narasimhaiah	JD	39,646	38.89	5,140
Tumkur	58	Kunigal	74.84	K. Lakkappa	INC	34,942	40.86	Y. K. Ramaiah	JP	33,796	39.52	1,146
Tumkur	59	Huliyurdurga	75.94	N. Huchamasti Gowda	INC	32,272	43.71	D. Nagarajaiah	JP	31,553	42.74	719
Tumkur	60	Gubbi	74.05	G. S. Shivananjappa	INC	33,524	42.85	K. R. Thathaiah	JD	17,339	22.16	16,185
Tumkur	61	Turuvekere	75.96	S. Rudrappa	INC	43,803	54.18	H. B. Nanjegowda	JP	15,586	19.28	28,217
Tumkur	62	Tiptur	76.12	T. M. Manjanath	INC	61,052	68.83	B. S. Chandrashekaraiah	JD	12,783	14.41	48,269
Tumkur	63	Chikkanayakanahalli	77.34	J. C. Madhu Swamy	JD	26,291	33.01	B. Lakkappa	INC	25,663	32.22	628
Kolar	64	Gauribidanur	73.75	S. V. Ashwathanarayana Reddy	INC	40,911	49.40	Jyothi Reddy N.	JD	30,020	36.25	10,891
Kolar	65	Chikballapur	71.24	Renuka Rajendran	INC	39,958	48.60	K. M. Muniyappa	JP	25,646	31.19	14,312
Kolar	66	Sidlaghatta	83.48	V. Muniyappa	INC	52,870	56.47	S. Munishainappa	JD	27,798	29.69	25,072
Kolar	67	Bagepalli	75.62	C. V. Venkatarayappa	INC	37,265	47.15	G. V. Sreerama Reddy	CPI(M)	35,639	45.09	1,626
Kolar	68	Chintamani	78.45	Chowda Reddy	INC	57,139	59.23	K. M. Krishna Reddy	JD	37,206	38.57	19,933
Kolar	69	Srinivasapur	84.20	G. K. Venkatashiva Reddy	INC	48,231	54.85	K. R. Ramesh Kumar	JD	38,938	44.28	9,293
Kolar	70	Mulbagal	73.02	M. V. Venkatappa	INC	33,285	36.83	K. V. Shankarappa	JP	20,787	23.00	12,498
Kolar	71	Kolar Gold Field	64.45	M. Backthavachalam	AIADMK	32,928	51.13	T. S. Mani	CPI(M)	12,192	18.93	20,736
Kolar	72	Bethamangala	65.86	M. Narayanaswamy	JD	28,162	36.15	C. Venkateshappa	Ind	23,281	29.89	4,881
Kolar	73	Kolar	73.65	K. A. Nisar Ahamed	INC	39,860	45.52	K. R. Shrinivasaiah	JD	33,796	38.60	6,064
Kolar	74	Vemagal	80.06	C. Byre Gowda	JP	42,687	48.86	K. R. Erappa	Ind	23,347	26.72	19,340
Kolar	75	Malur	78.18	A. Nagaraju	INC	42,788	53.42	B. M. Krishnappa	JD	17,680	22.07	25,108
Bangalore	76	Malleshwaram	56.02	Jeevaraj Alva	JD	34,955	42.52	P. Ramdev	Ind	31,285	38.06	3,670
Bangalore	77	Rajaji Nagar	57.64	K. Lakkanna	INC	50,707	38.00	R. V. Hareesh	JD	32,196	24.12	18,511
Bangalore	78	Gandhi Nagar	58.76	R. Dayananda Rao	INC	32,767	53.81	Leeladevi R. Prasad	JD	12,617	20.72	20,150
Bangalore	79	Chickpet	58.08	Perikal M. Mallappa	INC	28,167	55.27	Lakshmisagar	JD	10,237	20.09	17,930
Bangalore	80	Binnypet	57.72	Naseer Ahmed	INC	61,285	43.74	V. Somanna	JP	46,322	33.06	14,963
Bangalore	81	Chamrajpet	55.47	R. V. Devaraj	INC	27,526	51.07	Mohammad Moienuddin	JD	15,482	28.72	12,044
Bangalore	82	Basavanagudi	61.57	Ramakrishna Hegde	JD	35,342	38.79	Haranahalli Ramaswamy	INC	26,924	29.55	8,418
Bangalore	83	Jayanagar	36.67	Ramalinga Reddy	INC	37,836	48.56	M. Chandrasekhar	JD	20,655	26.51	17,181
Bangalore	84	Shanti Nagar	53.14	M. Muniswamy	INC	42,828	61.16	D. G. Hemavathy	JD	17,788	25.40	25,040
Bangalore	85	Shivajinagar	56.92	A. K. Anatha Krishna	INC	21,857	48.43	R. Roshan Baig	JD	21,766	48.23	91
Bangalore	86	Bharathinagar	56.54	K. J. George	INC	36,198	57.53	S. Suryanarayana Rao	CPI(M)	12,387	19.69	23,811
Bangalore	87	Jayamahal	54.60	S. M. Yahya	INC	41,884	52.60	T. Prabhakar	JD	26,159	32.85	15,725
Bangalore	88	Yelahanka	52.60	B. Basavalingappa	INC	70,882	49.94	V. Shivaraj	JD	47,520	33.48	23,362
Bangalore	89	Uttarahalli	52.69	S. Ramesh	INC	125,065	54.35	M. Srinivas	JD	71,523	31.08	53,542
Bangalore	90	Varthur	58.73	A. Krishnappa	INC	69,586	48.26	Ashwatha Reddy	JD	62,375	43.26	7,211
Bangalore	91	Kanakapura	79.04	P. G. R. Sindhia	JD	36,614	40.70	Marilinge Gowda	INC	32,245	35.85	4,369
Bangalore	92	Sathanur	79.00	D. K. Shivakumar	INC	44,595	49.77	U. K. Swamy	JP	30,945	34.53	13,650
Bangalore	93	Channapatna	79.40	Sadath Khan	INC	51,010	50.47	M. Varade Gowda	JP	42,912	42.46	8,098
Bangalore	94	Ramanagara	76.22	C. M. Lingappa	INC	60,275	62.43	C. Boraiah	JP	22,022	22.81	38,253
Bangalore	95	Magadi	74.06	H. M. Revanna	INC	46,697	52.66	Berraswamy Gowda	JP	24,001	27.07	22,696
Bangalore	96	Nelamangala	71.57	Anjana Murthy	INC	40,675	52.27	M. Shankar Naik	JD	21,491	27.62	19,184
Bangalore	97	Doddaballapur	75.73	R. L. Jalappa	JD	48,096	49.80	V. Krishnappa	INC	44,577	46.15	3,519
Bangalore	98	Devanahalli	74.44	Muninarasimhaiah	INC	58,569	58.55	M. Muniyappa	JD	34,333	34.32	24,236
Bangalore	99	Hosakote	78.46	N. Chikke Gowda	INC	57,007	50.95	B. N. Bache Gowda	JD	44,352	39.64	12,655
Bangalore	100	Anekal	69.55	M. P. Keshavamurthy	INC	39,462	40.57	M. R. Venugopal	JD	24,331	25.01	15,131
Mandya	101	Nagamangala	77.51	L. R. Shivarame Gowda	Ind	48,654	56.80	T. M. Chandrashekar	INC	17,185	20.06	31,469
Mandya	102	Maddur	76.44	S. M. Krishna	INC	37,935	42.68	H. Srinivasu	KS	24,784	27.88	13,151
Mandya	103	Kirugavalu	81.46	K. M. Puttu	INC	42,391	48.36	Rame Gowda	JP	35,102	40.04	7,289
Mandya	104	Malavalli	74.91	Mallajamma	INC	35,723	41.24	M. L. Lingarajamurthy	JP	17,936	20.70	17,787
Mandya	105	Mandya	67.54	M. S. Athmananda	INC	50,332	55.81	S. D. Jayaram	JP	22,503	24.95	27,829
Mandya	106	Keragodu	77.69	N. Thammanna	INC	30,575	40.31	G. B. Shivakumar	JP	22,634	29.84	7,941
Mandya	107	Shrirangapattana	75.07	Damayanthi Gowda	INC	29,159	34.00	Vijayalakshmanmma	JP	25,876	30.17	3,283
Mandya	108	Pandavapura	80.39	D. Halagegowda	INC	30,520	32.92	K. S. Puttannaiah	KS	27,121	29.26	3,399
Mandya	109	Krishnarajpete	75.99	M. Puttaswamy Gowda	INC	35,963	40.51	K. N. Kenge Gowda	JP	30,791	34.69	5,172
Mysore	110	Hanur	77.94	G. Raju Gouda	INC	50,008	51.66	H. Nagappa	JD	44,510	45.98	5,498
Mysore	111	Kollegal	69.27	M. Siddamadaiah	INC	46,998	63.13	B. Basavaiah	JD	22,810	30.64	24,188
Mysore	112	Bannur	78.38	K. M. Chikkamadanaik	INC	34,204	41.50	S. Krishnappa	JP	19,137	23.22	15,067
Mysore	113	T. Narasipur	71.98	M. Sreenivasaiah	INC	38,915	51.20	H. C. Mahadevappa	JD	28,491	37.49	10,424
Mysore	114	Krishnaraja	56.92	K. N. Somasundaram	INC	28,722	50.74	M. Vedantha Hemmige	JD	18,990	33.55	9,732
Mysore	115	Chamaraja	55.00	Harsha Gowda	INC	31,514	42.43	C. Basavegowda	JD	20,408	27.48	11,106
Mysore	116	Narasimharaja	57.23	Azeez Sait	INC	39,858	47.95	Maruthi Pawar	BJP	24,698	29.71	15,160
Mysore	117	Chamundeshwari	78.35	M. Rajasekara Murthy	INC	42,892	42.64	Siddaramaiah	JD	36,483	36.27	6,409
Mysore	118	Nanjangud	75.41	M. Mahadev	INC	36,176	47.63	D. T. Jayakumar	JD	23,525	30.97	12,651
Mysore	119	Santhemarahalli	70.53	K. Siddaiah	INC	40,066	56.95	A. R. Krishnamurthy	JD	22,310	31.71	17,756
Mysore	120	Chamarajanagar	74.13	Vatal Nagaraj	Ind	35,642	38.76	S. Puttaswamy	INC	29,749	32.35	5,893
Mysore	121	Gundlupet	77.59	K. S. Nagarathnamma	INC	50,643	57.06	H. S. Mahadeva Prasad	JD	32,587	36.71	18,056
Mysore	122	Heggadadevankote	74.56	M. P. Ventatesh	JP	29,676	34.80	Kote M. Shivanna	INC	27,507	32.25	2,169
Mysore	123	Hunasuru	74.93	Chandraprabha Urs	INC	51,086	54.27	D. Kariyappa Gowda	JD	18,349	19.49	32,737
Mysore	124	Krishnarajanagara	81.70	Adagur H. Vishwanath	INC	61,509	65.88	S. Nanjappa	JP	26,467	28.35	35,042
Mysore	125	Periyapatna	78.17	K. S. Kalamarigowda	INC	46,460	47.48	S. M. Anantharamu	JP	28,121	28.74	18,339
Kodagu	126	Virajpet	58.87	Suma Vasantha	INC	32,124	53.62	G. S. Pushkara	JD	16,872	28.16	15,252
Kodagu	127	Madikeri	67.14	D. A. Chinnappa	INC	30,804	42.63	Subbaya Dambekodi	BJP	23,538	32.57	7,266
Kodagu	128	Somwarpet	73.30	A. M. Belliappa	INC	38,250	44.34	B. B. Shivappa	BJP	19,104	22.15	19,146
Hassan	129	Belur	69.41	B. H. Lakshmanaiah	INC	34,220	46.73	N. Srinivasa Murthy	Ind	20,764	28.35	13,456
Hassan	130	Arsikere	69.32	K. P. Prabhu Kumar	INC	30,533	35.82	G. S. Parameswarappa	JD	19,591	22.98	10,942
Hassan	131	Gandasi	75.24	B. Shivaramu	INC	47,281	56.47	E. Nanje Gowda	JD	21,654	25.86	25,627
Hassan	132	Shravanabelagola	75.12	N. B. Nanjappa	INC	62,350	56.83	C. S. Putte Gowda	JP	41,711	38.02	20,639
Hassan	133	Holenarasipur	83.21	G. Puttaswamy Gowda	INC	53,297	53.43	H. D. Deve Gowda	JP	45,461	45.58	7,836
Hassan	134	Arkalgud	76.18	A. T. Ramaswamy	INC	30,507	36.29	K. B. Maliappa	JD	20,889	24.85	9,618
Hassan	135	Hassan	66.73	K. H. Hanume Gowda	INC	68,210	64.94	B. V. Karigowda	JP	25,209	24.00	43,001
Hassan	136	Sakleshpur	76.15	Gurudev	INC	40,039	40.80	H. B. Yajaman	JP	34,025	34.67	6,014
Dakshina Kannada	137	Sullia	75.45	K. Kushala	INC	33,560	38.61	S. Angara	BJP	27,720	31.89	5,840
Dakshina Kannada	138	Puttur	77.08	Vinay Kumar Sorake	INC	43,695	46.58	Sadananda Gowda	BJP	42,134	44.91	1,561
Dakshina Kannada	139	Vittal	74.41	A. Rukmayya Poojari	BJP	27,846	31.99	K. P. Abdulla	INC	21,164	24.32	6,682
Dakshina Kannada	140	Belthangady	74.14	K. Gangadhara Gowda	INC	40,964	44.95	K. Vasantha Bangera	Ind	39,754	43.62	1,210
Dakshina Kannada	141	Bantval	68.46	Ramanath Rai	INC	32,939	48.36	H. Narayana Rai	BJP	16,995	24.95	15,944
Dakshina Kannada	142	Mangalore	65.46	Blasius D'Souza	INC	23,739	39.29	N. Yogish Bhat	BJP	21,869	36.20	1,870
Dakshina Kannada	143	Ullal	65.43	B. M. Idinabba	INC	25,785	36.54	K. R. Shriyan	CPI(M)	20,371	28.87	5,414
Dakshina Kannada	144	Surathkal	65.80	Vijaya Shetty	INC	35,230	45.29	B. Subbayya Shetty	JD	20,000	25.71	15,230
Dakshina Kannada	145	Kapu	59.20	Vasanth V. Salian	INC	29,823	54.52	B. Bhaskar Shetty	JD	21,593	39.47	8,230
Dakshina Kannada	146	Udupi	69.02	Manorama Madhwaraj	INC	29,490	39.05	U. R. Sabhapathi	Ind	28,705	38.01	785
Dakshina Kannada	147	Brahmavar	67.87	P. Basavaraj	INC	41,709	51.72	K. Jayaprakash Hegde	JD	36,902	45.76	4,807
Dakshina Kannada	148	Kundapura	66.55	K. Prathapachandra Shetty	INC	46,641	58.60	K. N. Govardhan	JD	27,540	34.60	19,101
Dakshina Kannada	149	Byndoor	66.42	G. S. Achar	INC	35,892	48.07	Mani Gopal	JD	35,373	47.37	519
Dakshina Kannada	150	Karkala	68.86	Veerappa Moily	INC	41,171	56.80	M. K. Vijaya Kumar	JD	22,391	30.89	18,780
Dakshina Kannada	151	Moodabidri	71.88	K. Somappa Suvarna	INC	34,667	51.90	K. Amarnath Shetty	JD	29,219	43.74	5,448
Chikmagalur	152	Sringeri	74.51	U. K. Shamanna	INC	36,912	44.36	H. G. Govinde Gowda	JD	23,122	27.79	13,790
Chikmagalur	153	Mudigere	66.97	C. Motamma	INC	40,540	54.96	B. B. Ningaiah	JD	14,749	20.00	25,791
Chikmagalur	154	Chikmagalur	67.36	C. R. Sageer Ahamed	INC	31,411	41.69	S. V. Manjunath	JP	20,209	26.82	11,202
Chikmagalur	155	Birur	73.17	K. S. Mallikarjuna Pasanna	INC	33,954	45.73	S. R. Lakshmaiah	JP	17,400	23.43	16,554
Chikmagalur	156	Kadur	75.70	M. Veerabhadrappa	INC	38,494	48.49	K. M. Krishnamurthy	JD	28,729	36.19	9,765
Chikmagalur	157	Tarikere	69.71	H. R. Raju	INC	36,919	44.79	B. R. Neelakantappa	JD	18,496	22.44	18,423
Shimoga	158	Channagiri	76.00	N. G. Halappa	INC	47,179	53.85	J. H. Patel	JD	31,553	36.02	15,626
Shimoga	159	Holehonnur	69.95	Kariyanna	INC	38,674	45.44	H. Chooda Naik	KS	22,940	26.96	15,734
Shimoga	160	Bhadravati	65.94	Isamia S.	INC	36,487	40.64	M. J. Appaji Gowda	JP	25,819	28.76	10,668
Shimoga	161	Honnali	78.23	D. B. Gangappa	INC	49,177	48.93	D. G. Basavana Gowda	JD	38,105	37.92	11,072
Shimoga	162	Shimoga	59.65	K. S. Eshwarappa	BJP	32,289	34.81	K. H. Srinivasa	INC	30,987	33.40	1,302
Shimoga	163	Tirthahalli	74.05	D. B. Chandregowda	JD	31,671	37.65	Kadilal Divakar	INC	28,526	33.91	3,145
Shimoga	164	Hosanagar	75.42	B. Swamy Rao	INC	39,668	43.80	G. Nanjundappa	JD	26,316	29.06	13,352
Shimoga	165	Sagar	73.47	Kagodu Thimmappa	INC	46,234	55.57	B. R. Jayanth	JD	24,876	29.90	21,358
Shimoga	166	Soraba	79.38	Sarekoppa Bangarappa	INC	41,648	54.68	Parashuramappa Edooru	JD	27,107	35.59	14,541
Shimoga	167	Shikaripura	77.42	B. S. Yediyurappa	BJP	36,589	41.42	Mahadevappa Nagarada	Ind	34,315	38.85	2,274
Uttara Kannada	168	Sirsi	70.89	Gopal Kanade	INC	40,319	49.34	Mahabaleswara Sirasikara	JD	30,801	37.70	9,518
Uttara Kannada	169	Bhatkal	63.55	Rama Naik	INC	29,513	39.43	Damodar Gardikar	JD	27,421	36.64	2,092
Uttara Kannada	170	Kumta	68.86	Krishna Gouda	INC	34,556	43.86	Kamalakar Gokaran	JD	24,182	30.69	10,374
Uttara Kannada	171	Ankola	68.99	Umesh Bhat	INC	25,122	36.82	Ramchandra Bhat	JD	21,287	31.20	3,835
Uttara Kannada	172	Karwar	61.69	Prabhakar Rane	INC	33,741	53.98	Arvind Tendulkar	JD	17,893	28.62	15,848
Uttara Kannada	173	Haliyal	74.21	R. V. Deshpande	JD	37,274	38.07	Sahadev Kurjal	INC	36,984	37.77	290
Dharwad	174	Dharwad Rural	73.64	Babagouda Patil	KS	35,497	45.76	Shrikant Ambadagatti	INC	21,688	27.96	13,809
Dharwad	175	Dharwad	59.01	Morey S. R.	INC	36,627	48.07	Gangadhar Padaki	JD	14,736	19.34	21,891
Dharwad	176	Hubli City	65.15	A. M. Hindasageri	INC	37,832	51.77	Ashok Katwe	BJP	19,844	27.16	17,988
Dharwad	177	Hubli Rural	61.70	G. R. Sandra	INC	45,718	47.66	Somappa Bommai	JD	42,548	44.35	3,170
Dharwad	178	Kalghatgi	73.32	Parwat Shiddanagoudar	JD	19,417	27.37	Mahadevappa Kelageri	KS	18,700	26.36	717
Dharwad	179	Kundgol	70.80	Govindappa Jutal	INC	36,925	51.47	Ravasaheb Desai	JD	31,404	43.78	5,521
Dharwad	180	Shiggaon	71.07	Manjunath Kunnur	INC	40,549	49.70	Sayyadnooruddin Khadri	JD	36,035	44.16	4,514
Dharwad	181	Hangal	83.88	Manohar Tahasildar	INC	54,760	57.46	C. M. Udasi	JD	39,023	40.94	15,737
Dharwad	182	Hirekerur	74.17	B. H. Bannikod	JD	34,093	39.71	G. B. Shankar Rao	INC	30,955	36.05	3,138
Dharwad	183	Ranibennur	72.85	K. B. Koliwad	INC	43,228	49.36	Veerappa Karjagi	JD	40,350	46.07	2,878
Dharwad	184	Byadgi	71.70	Heggappa Lamani	INC	34,405	47.33	Kallokappa Beelagi	JD	31,565	43.42	2,840
Dharwad	185	Haveri	72.85	M. D. Shivapur	INC	45,331	51.47	Basavaraj Shivannanavar	JD	39,488	44.84	5,843
Dharwad	186	Shirahatti	74.65	Shankaragouda Patil	INC	24,882	33.59	Malleshappa Mahantashettar	JD	23,715	32.01	1,167
Dharwad	187	Mundargi	68.66	Kuberappa Kurudigi	INC	24,914	34.82	Chandrahas Ullagaddi	KS	23,203	32.43	1,711
Dharwad	188	Gadag	68.23	Kristagouda Patil	INC	44,155	55.69	Chanaveerayya Muttinapendimath	JD	28,463	35.90	15,692
Dharwad	189	Ron	68.97	Gurupadagouda Patil	INC	32,610	46.00	Jananadev Doddameti	JD	21,203	29.91	11,407
Dharwad	190	Nargund	70.43	Siddanagouda Patil	INC	30,284	48.69	B. R. Yavagal	JD	29,595	47.58	689
Dharwad	191	Navalgund	66.55	Mallappa Kulkarni	INC	27,222	42.80	Vijay Mankani	KS	16,729	26.30	10,493
Belagavi	192	Ramdurg	68.44	Rudragouda Patil	INC	32,662	42.02	Basavantappa Hireraddi	JD	25,453	32.75	7,209
Belagavi	193	Parasgad	73.76	Subhash Koujalgi	INC	44,777	49.88	Chandrashekhar Mamani	JD	36,627	40.80	8,150
Belagavi	194	Bailhongal	73.08	Shivanand Koujalagi	JD	28,223	38.08	P. B. Patil	INC	26,464	35.71	1,759
Belagavi	195	Kittur	78.16	Babagouda Patil	KS	40,071	46.29	D. B. Inamdar	JD	25,058	28.95	15,013
Belagavi	196	Khanapur	65.97	Bithalrao Chavan	Ind	33,662	45.59	Appaji Patil	KS	18,571	25.15	15,091
Belagavi	197	Belagavi City	67.27	Bapusaheb Mahagaonkar	Ind	35,196	38.96	Anil Potdar	JP	29,809	32.99	5,387
Belagavi	198	Uchagaon	61.13	Basavant Patil	Ind	46,625	56.97	Baburao Pisale	INC	14,518	17.74	32,107
Belagavi	199	Hire Bagewadi	71.49	Chudamani Modagekar	Ind	22,212	26.65	Kisan Yallurkar	Ind	22,049	26.45	163
Belagavi	200	Gokak	67.32	Shankar Karning	INC	37,781	48.46	Mallappa Muttennavar	JD	22,723	29.15	15,058
Belagavi	201	Arabhavi	66.84	Veeranna Koujalgi	INC	31,009	34.34	Tammanna Parsi	KS	24,389	27.01	6,620
Belagavi	202	Hukkeri	73.11	Umesh Katti	JD	27,056	39.46	Murugesh Dhapalapur	INC	19,685	28.71	7,371
Belagavi	203	Sankeshwar	73.06	Malhargouda Patil	INC	33,088	47.05	Appayyagouda Patil	JD	28,960	41.18	4,128
Belagavi	204	Nippani	70.78	Subhash Joshi	JD	26,009	36.43	Channarao Amble	INC	25,655	35.93	354
Belagavi	205	Sadalga	74.31	Veerkumar Patil	INC	35,358	46.21	Kallappa Magennavar	JD	33,185	43.37	2,173
Belagavi	206	Chikkodi	62.17	Shrikant Bhimannavar	INC	21,670	33.40	Shrikant Katti	JD	18,902	29.14	2,768
Belagavi	207	Raibag	66.13	Shama Ghatage	INC	37,948	42.89	Maruti Ghewari	JD	30,300	34.25	7,648
Belagavi	208	Kagwad	69.24	Annarao B. Jakanur	INC	30,658	41.67	Kiran T. Patil	JD	19,689	26.76	10,969
Belagavi	209	Athani	62.43	I. M. Shedshyal	INC	31,144	41.98	V. L. Patil	JD	24,130	32.52	7,014
Bijapur	210	Jamkhandi	71.11	Ramappa Kaluti	INC	55,927	55.54	Gurupadappa Bagalkot	JD	40,662	40.38	15,265
Bijapur	211	Bilgi	71.90	Gurusiddappa Yalligutti	JD	37,677	43.09	Vasappa Desai	INC	33,279	38.06	4,398
Bijapur	212	Mudhol	71.37	R. B. Timmapur	INC	42,073	51.60	Bhimappa Jamakhandi	JD	24,834	30.46	17,239
Bijapur	213	Bagalkot	67.96	Ajay Sarnaik	JD	22,551	31.14	Rajashekhar Kanthi	Ind	17,088	23.59	5,463
Bijapur	214	Badami	67.47	Mahagundappa K. Pattanshetty	JD	36,596	50.93	Shiddayya Kadayyanavar	INC	25,405	35.36	11,191
Bijapur	215	Guledgud	67.63	H. Y. Meti	JD	32,411	45.13	Shankrayya Nanjayynmath	INC	30,479	42.44	1,932
Bijapur	216	Hungund	67.15	Shivashankarappa Kashappanavar	INC	44,065	63.63	Shivasangappa Kadapatti	JD	24,129	34.84	19,936
Bijapur	217	Muddebihal	68.52	C. S. Nadagouda	INC	31,933	49.17	Jagadevrao	JD	29,840	45.95	2,093
Bijapur	218	Huvina Hippargi	64.06	Basanagoud Patil	INC	36,588	52.84	Shivputrappa Desai	JD	21,193	30.61	15,395
Bijapur	219	Basavana Bagevadi	64.07	Somanagouda Patil	INC	37,868	52.71	Kumaragouda Patil	JD	25,235	35.13	12,633
Bijapur	220	Tikota	67.95	M. B. Patil	INC	37,832	53.04	Basanagouda Patil	JD	33,228	46.59	4,604
Bijapur	221	Bijapur	61.05	Ustad Patel	INC	45,623	54.33	Rachappa Avarangbad	JD	34,355	40.91	11,268
Bijapur	222	Ballolli	61.94	Manohar Ainapur	INC	27,782	40.44	Ramesh Jigajinagi	JD	23,357	34.00	4,425
Bijapur	223	Indi	58.23	Revanasiddappa Kallur	INC	27,154	40.46	Basagondappa Patil	JD	18,438	27.47	8,716
Bijapur	224	Sindagi	60.45	Rayagondappa Choudhari	INC	29,798	41.02	Mallappa Managuli	JP	21,169	29.14	8,629
