= 1985 Karnataka Legislative Assembly election =

- 3 May 1985

All 224 seats of the Karnataka Legislative Assembly 113 seats needed for a majority
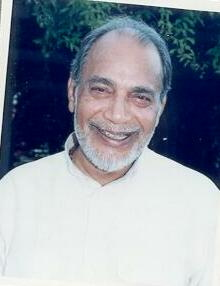

	Majority party	Minority party
Leader	Ramakrishna Hegde
Party	JP	INC
Leader's seat	Basavanagudi
Last election	95	82
Seats won	139	65
Seat change	▲44	▼17
Popular vote	6,418,795	6,009,461
Percentage	43.60%	40.82%
Swing	▲10.53%	▲0.40%
Chief Minister before election
Ramakrishna Hegde
JP
Elected Chief Minister
Ramakrishna Hegde
JP

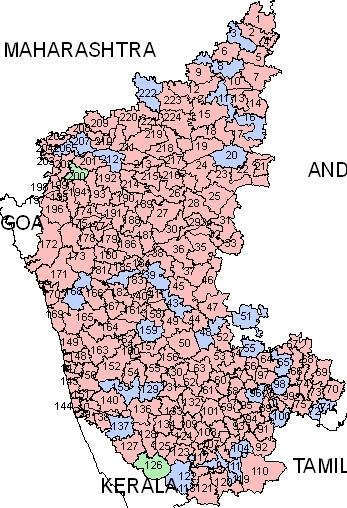
Karnataka Legislative Assembly constituencies (1978-2008)

The 1985 Karnataka Legislative Assembly election was held in the Indian state of Karnataka to elect 224 members of the Karnataka Legislative Assembly on 3 May 1985. The election resulted in a spectacular victory for the Janata Party, led by Chief minister Ramakrishna Hegde.

== Results ==
Summary of results of the Karnataka Legislative Assembly election, 1985
Party	Seats contested	Seats won	Votes	Vote %	Seat change
Janata Party	205	139	6,418,795	43.60%	▲44
Indian National Congress	223	65	6,009,461	40.82%	▼17
Communist Party of India	7	3	133,008	0.90%	Steady
Bharatiya Janata Party	116	2	571,280	3.88%	▼16
Communist Party of India (Marxist)	7	2	127,333	0.86%	▼1
Independents	1200	13	1,393,626	9.47%	▼9
Total	1795	224	14,720,634		

=== Results by district ===
District	Seats				
District	Seats	JNP	INC	IND	OTH
Bagalkot	7	6	1	—N/a	—N/a
Bengaluru Rural	4	4	—N/a	—N/a	—N/a
Bengaluru Urban	16	10	5	—N/a	1
Belagavi	18	12	2	4	—N/a
Bellary	8	5	3	—N/a	—N/a
Bidar	6	4	2	—N/a	—N/a
Bijapur	8	6	2	—N/a	—N/a
Chamarajanagar	5	2	2	1	—N/a
Chikmagalur	6	4	—N/a	2	—N/a
Chitradurga	7	5	2	—N/a	—N/a
Dakshina Kannada	9	1	7	—N/a	1
Davanagere	7	4	2	—N/a	1
Dharwad	7	4	2	1	—N/a
Gadag	5	4	1	—N/a	—N/a
Gulbarga	13	3	8	1	1
Hassan	8	7	—N/a	1	—N/a
Haveri	6	4	1	1	—N/a
Kodagu	3	1	2	—N/a	—N/a
Kolar	12	9	1	—N/a	2
Koppal	5	4	1	—N/a	—N/a
Mandya	9	6	2	1	—N/a
Mysore	11	9	2	—N/a	—N/a
Raichur	6	4	2	—N/a	—N/a
Ramanagara	5	5	—N/a	—N/a	—N/a
Shimoga	8	2	4	1	1
Tumakuru	13	10	3	—N/a	—N/a
Udupi	6	—N/a	6	—N/a	—N/a
Uttara Kannada	6	4	2	—N/a	—N/a
Total	224	139	65	13	7

=== Results by constituency ===
District	Constituency		Turnout	Winner				Runner-up				Margin
District	No.	Name	%	Candidate	Party	Votes	%	Candidate	Party	Votes	%	Margin
Bidar	1	Aurad	66.97	Gurupadappa Nagamarapalli	JP	30,972	41.91	Bapurao Patil	Ind	26,504	35.86	4,468
Bidar	2	Bhalki	65.81	Kalyan Molkheri	JP	27,994	48.96	Bhimanna Khandare	INC	26,490	46.33	1,504
Bidar	3	Hulsoor	48.45	Shivakhantha Cheture	JP	20,468	45.80	Ramachandra Veerappa	INC	11,300	25.29	9,168
Bidar	4	Bidar	48.48	Mohd Burhanuddin	INC	25,206	45.25	Narayan Manhalli	BJP	22,049	39.58	3,157
Bidar	5	Humnabad	55.37	Basavaraj Havgiappa Patil	INC	25,763	49.52	Dayanandrao Chandrabhanu	JP	21,380	41.10	4,383
Bidar	6	Basavakalyan	64.74	Basavaraj Patil Attur	JP	34,556	52.56	Marutirao Muley	INC	27,951	42.52	6,605
Gulbarga	7	Chincholi	48.27	Veerayya Swami	INC	20,387	46.32	Chander Patil	JP	18,847	42.82	1,540
Gulbarga	8	Kamalapur	47.44	G. Ramkrishna	INC	14,778	36.25	Vithal Doddamani	JP	12,546	30.77	2,232
Gulbarga	9	Aland	66.97	Sharnabassappa Patil	INC	28,085	49.42	B. R. Patil	JP	27,423	48.25	662
Gulbarga	10	Gulbarga	66.93	S. K. Kanta	JP	36,828	41.40	Qamarul Islam	Ind	35,794	40.24	1,034
Gulbarga	11	Shahabad	54.65	K. B. Shanappa	CPI	16,263	27.41	Gurunath Chandram	Ind	16,188	27.28	75
Gulbarga	12	Afzalpur	65.15	Malikayya Guttedar	INC	38,777	62.40	Hanumantrao Desai	JP	22,304	35.89	16,473
Gulbarga	13	Chittapur	55.03	Vishawanath Patil	JP	23,038	49.52	Hanumanthraya Allur	INC	19,605	42.14	3,433
Gulbarga	14	Sedam	56.05	Chandershekhar Madna	Ind	20,982	41.66	Sher Khan	INC	13,984	27.77	6,998
Gulbarga	15	Jevargi	59.80	Dharam Singh	INC	27,548	48.15	Channabassappa Kulageri	JP	22,957	40.12	4,591
Gulbarga	16	Gurmitkal	57.72	Mallikarjun Kharge	INC	32,669	66.00	B. S. Gajanana	JP	14,996	30.30	17,673
Gulbarga	17	Yadgir	62.64	Vishwanath Reddy	JP	28,756	51.74	A. B. Malaka Reddy	INC	24,374	43.86	4,382
Gulbarga	18	Shahapur	63.90	Shivashekharappagouda Sirwal	INC	33,540	51.60	Bapugouda Darshanapur	JP	27,785	42.74	5,755
Gulbarga	19	Shorapur	53.81	Raja Nayak	INC	22,411	39.96	Shivanna Mangihal	JP	21,238	37.87	1,173
Raichur	20	Devadurga	43.21	A. Purshpavathi	JP	17,127	47.17	B. Shivanna	INC	15,790	43.49	1,337
Raichur	21	Raichur	41.16	Mohamed Rahman	INC	21,896	52.86	Abdul Siddiqui	JP	8,392	20.26	13,504
Raichur	22	Kalmala	57.04	Krishnamurthy	JP	27,355	51.25	Parasmal Sukhany	INC	25,181	47.17	2,174
Raichur	23	Manvi	68.76	Thimmangouda Anwari	JP	31,929	55.67	N. S. Boseraju	INC	24,283	42.34	7,646
Raichur	24	Lingsugur	57.75	Raja Amareshwara Naik	JP	32,207	64.79	K. Sanganagouda	INC	14,219	28.60	17,988
Raichur	25	Sindhanur	66.00	R. Narayanappa	INC	41,723	51.99	M. Mallappa	JP	38,527	48.01	3,196
Raichur	26	Kushtagi	64.64	M. S. Patil	JP	32,901	55.26	Hanamagouda Patil	INC	23,816	40.00	9,085
Raichur	27	Yelburga	59.11	Basavaraj Rayareddy	JP	28,674	53.54	Subashchandra Patil	INC	23,439	43.77	5,235
Raichur	28	Kanakagiri	64.01	Srirangadevarayalu	INC	29,791	50.56	Nagappa Saloni	JP	29,128	49.44	663
Raichur	29	Gangawati	66.60	Mahadevappa Gouli	JP	37,300	54.08	H. S. Jayaprakash	INC	31,145	45.16	6,155
Raichur	30	Koppal	66.83	Virupakshappa Agadi	JP	32,131	52.88	Shantanna Mudgal	INC	27,218	44.79	4,913
Bellary	31	Siruguppa	66.83	C. M. Revana Siddaiah	JP	39,238	49.34	M. Shankar Reddy	INC	36,626	46.06	2,612
Bellary	32	Kurugodu	60.15	B. Shivarama Reddy	JP	32,446	54.65	H. Nagana Gowda	INC	26,608	44.82	5,838
Bellary	33	Bellary	42.35	M. Ramappa	INC	20,485	40.74	Sharada Bennur	CPI	17,852	35.50	2,633
Bellary	34	Hospet	60.14	Bheemaneni Kondaiah	JP	45,777	62.51	G. Shankar Goud	INC	27,452	37.49	18,325
Bellary	35	Sandur	54.42	U. Bhupathi	JP	26,748	56.16	K. S. Veerabhadrappa	INC	16,628	34.91	10,120
Bellary	36	Kudligi	67.63	N. T. Bommanna	INC	31,252	52.22	N. M. Nabisahib	JP	26,734	44.67	4,518
Bellary	37	Kottur	73.74	K. V. Ravindranath Babu	INC	32,804	51.53	B. S. Veerabhadrappa	JP	29,548	46.41	3,256
Bellary	38	Hoovina Hadagali	75.99	M. P. Prakash	JP	44,870	59.34	G. Andanappa	INC	29,268	38.71	15,602
Bellary	39	Harapanahalli	70.05	B. H. Yanka Naik	INC	29,206	48.05	D. Narayana Das	JP	23,662	38.93	5,544
Chitradurga	40	Harihar	68.94	B. G. Kotrappa	JP	40,089	51.08	Y. Nagappa	INC	35,539	45.28	4,550
Chitradurga	41	Davanagere	61.34	Pampapathi	CPI	35,639	47.93	Mothi Yajaman	INC	31,866	42.86	3,773
Chitradurga	42	Mayakonda	68.94	Kannavara Mallappa	JP	37,137	49.90	K. R. Jayadevappa	INC	33,319	44.77	3,818
Chitradurga	43	Bharamasagara	70.11	B. M. Thippesamy	JP	30,450	48.35	Shivamurthy K.	INC	30,180	47.92	270
Chitradurga	44	Chitradurga	67.73	H. Ekanthaiah	JP	40,196	55.72	T. M. Khader Basha	INC	29,166	40.43	11,030
Chitradurga	45	Jagalur	73.10	G. H. Ashwath Reddy	INC	35,365	49.58	M. Basappa	JP	33,749	47.32	1,616
Chitradurga	46	Molakalmuru	63.87	Purna Muthappa	JP	30,022	50.76	N. G. Naik	INC	29,121	49.24	901
Chitradurga	47	Challakere	64.03	Thippeswamy	JP	36,163	58.87	B. L. Gowda	INC	22,551	36.71	13,612
Chitradurga	48	Hiriyur	57.48	R. Ramaiah	INC	32,542	54.05	T. Thippanna	JP	26,464	43.95	6,078
Chitradurga	49	Holalkere	75.15	G. C. Manjunath	JP	40,165	54.00	A. V. Umapathy	INC	31,238	42.00	8,927
Chitradurga	50	Hosadurga	74.94	G. Ramdas	INC	37,562	48.21	M. Sanna Chikkanna	JP	37,328	47.91	234
Tumkur	51	Pavagada	68.10	Somlanaika	JP	40,964	53.12	Ugranarashimappa	INC	29,401	38.12	11,563
Tumkur	52	Sira	62.24	C. P. Mudalagiriyappa	INC	20,049	31.97	S. K. Siddanna	Ind	19,967	31.84	82
Tumkur	53	Kallambella	72.58	B. L. Gowda	JP	36,027	55.20	S. Lingaiah	INC	25,244	38.68	10,783
Tumkur	54	Bellavi	72.51	C. N. Bhaskarappa	JP	36,909	53.55	C. Shivamurthy	INC	25,586	37.13	11,323
Tumkur	55	Madhugiri	72.04	Rajavardhan	JP	41,992	54.49	Ganga Hanumaiah	INC	30,456	39.52	11,536
Tumkur	56	Koratagere	78.17	C. Veeranna	JP	47,395	58.52	N. Sukumar	INC	32,379	39.98	15,016
Tumkur	57	Tumkur	62.30	Lakshmi Narasimhaiah	JP	40,440	54.40	Aliya Begum	INC	26,910	36.20	13,530
Tumkur	58	Kunigal	75.85	Y. K. Ramaiah	JP	49,309	65.75	Andanaiah	INC	25,007	33.34	24,302
Tumkur	59	Huliyurdurga	78.99	D. Nagarajaiah	JP	36,434	56.20	N. Huchamasti Gowda	INC	27,454	42.35	8,980
Tumkur	60	Gubbi	69.39	G. S. Shivananiaha	INC	26,847	44.37	S. M. Shivakumaraswamy	Ind	21,277	35.16	5,570
Tumkur	61	Turuvekere	76.48	K. H. Ramakrishnaiah	JP	35,272	51.31	B. Byrappaji	INC	30,788	44.79	4,484
Tumkur	62	Tiptur	77.23	B. S. Chandrashekaraiah	JP	36,594	51.24	T. M. Manjanath	INC	33,857	47.40	2,737
Tumkur	63	Chikkanayakanahalli	79.29	B. Lakkappa	INC	20,815	31.98	N. Basavaiah	Ind	18,297	28.11	2,518
Kolar	64	Gauribidanur	73.48	Mukhyamantri Chandru	JP	34,291	52.70	B. N. K. Papaiah	INC	27,660	42.51	6,631
Kolar	65	Chikballapur	69.46	K. M. Muniyappa	JP	39,216	58.37	K. N. Nagappa	INC	27,091	40.32	12,125
Kolar	66	Sidlaghatta	81.11	S. Munishainappa	JP	44,199	55.68	V. Muniyappa	INC	33,998	42.83	10,201
Kolar	67	Bagepalli	64.39	B. Narayana Swamy	INC	20,454	35.38	G. V. Sreerama Reddy	CPI(M)	18,444	31.90	2,010
Kolar	68	Chintamani	80.74	K. M. Krishna Reddy	JP	43,965	54.53	Chowda Reddy	INC	36,665	45.47	7,300
Kolar	69	Srinivasapur	81.90	K. R. Ramesh Kumar	JP	38,074	53.90	G. K. Venkatashiva Reddy	INC	31,941	45.22	6,133
Kolar	70	Mulbagal	68.53	R. Venkataramaiah	CPI(M)	42,712	63.04	M. V. Prameelamma	INC	20,608	30.41	22,104
Kolar	71	Kolar Gold Field	67.78	T. S. Mani	CPI(M)	28,325	51.02	M. Backthavachalam	Ind	12,545	22.60	15,780
Kolar	72	Bethamangala	59.93	A. Chinnappa	JP	38,843	65.13	V. Venkatamuni	INC	16,321	27.37	22,522
Kolar	73	Kolar	71.49	K. R. Shrinivasaiah	JP	34,701	51.99	Abdul Rahim	INC	21,556	32.29	13,145
Kolar	74	Vemagal	81.57	C. Byre Gowda	JP	46,945	61.84	K. R. Iragappa	INC	28,968	38.16	17,977
Kolar	75	Malur	74.71	H. B. Dyavarappa	JP	32,663	52.42	A. Nagaraju	INC	28,660	45.99	4,003
Bangalore	76	Malleshwaram	57.43	M. Raghupathy	JP	38,445	56.29	Vijoilakshami Bhat	INC	16,746	24.52	21,699
Bangalore	77	Rajaji Nagar	53.50	M. S. Krishnan	CPI	45,477	47.34	S. G. Venkataiah	INC	28,997	30.18	16,480
Bangalore	78	Gandhi Nagar	56.63	M. S. Narayana Rao	JP	20,671	39.12	Bima Raikar	INC	16,715	31.63	3,956
Bangalore	79	Chickpet	50.17	A. Lakshmisagar	JP	22,544	53.56	L. R. Ananth	INC	16,206	38.50	6,338
Bangalore	80	Binnypet	52.57	G. Narayana Kumar	JP	37,990	42.13	Soukat Kureshi	INC	35,484	39.35	2,506
Bangalore	81	Chamrajpet	51.01	Mohammad Moienuddin	JP	19,955	42.93	C. Krishnappa	INC	15,311	32.94	4,644
Bangalore	82	Basavanagudi	61.90	Ramakrishna Hegde	JP	61,018	76.35	K. M. Nagaraj	INC	18,238	22.82	42,780
Bangalore	83	Jayanagar	52.97	M. Chandrasekhar	JP	42,391	54.06	Ramalinga Reddy	INC	29,842	38.06	12,549
Bangalore	84	Shanti Nagar	49.46	C. Kannan	INC	20,090	40.85	D. G. Hemavathy	JP	16,598	33.75	3,492
Bangalore	85	Shivajinagar	43.62	R. Roshan Baig	JP	14,735	43.96	A. K. Anatha Krishna	INC	12,914	38.53	1,821
Bangalore	86	Bharathinagar	54.31	K. J. George	INC	22,141	43.10	Michael Fernandes	JP	18,195	35.42	3,946
Bangalore	87	Jayamahal	53.56	Jeevaraj Alva	JP	31,768	51.95	A. K. A. Samad	INC	25,172	41.17	6,596
Bangalore	88	Yelahanka	55.66	B. Basavalingappa	INC	47,302	51.94	V. Shivaraj	JP	40,960	44.98	6,342
Bangalore	89	Uttarahalli	55.60	M. Srinivas	JP	73,655	52.42	S. Ramesh	INC	58,522	41.65	15,133
Bangalore	90	Varthur	55.93	A. Krishnappa	INC	30,242	33.84	Ashwatha Reddy	Ind	30,144	33.73	98
Bangalore	91	Kanakapura	81.05	P. G. R. Sindhia	JP	53,669	66.40	M. V. Rajashekaran	INC	26,534	32.83	27,135
Bangalore	92	Sathanur	80.88	H. D. Deve Gowda	JP	45,612	59.33	D. K. Shivakumar	INC	29,809	38.78	15,803
Bangalore	93	Channapatna	77.47	M. Varade Gowda	JP	47,503	55.31	D. T. Ramu	INC	37,704	43.90	9,799
Bangalore	94	Ramanagara	73.46	Puttaswamy Gowda	JP	38,284	49.48	C. M. Lingappa	INC	36,280	46.89	2,004
Bangalore	95	Magadi	71.71	H. G. Channappa	JP	38,605	54.59	H. M. Revanna	INC	30,507	43.14	8,098
Bangalore	96	Nelamangala	74.69	B. Guruprasad	JP	38,967	62.70	Anjana Murthy	INC	23,177	37.30	15,790
Bangalore	97	Doddaballapur	77.18	R. L. Jalappa	JP	48,238	60.58	Satchidananda	INC	24,246	30.45	23,992
Bangalore	98	Devanahalli	70.76	P. C. Munishamaiah	JP	40,603	52.75	H. Puttadasu	INC	34,625	44.99	5,978
Bangalore	99	Hosakote	79.77	B. N. Bache Gowda	JP	45,552	49.12	N. Chikke Gowda	INC	41,133	44.35	4,419
Bangalore	100	Anekal	65.91	M. P. Keshavamurthy	INC	34,586	46.19	C. Thopaiah	JP	30,518	40.76	4,068
Mandya	101	Nagamangala	70.08	H. T. Krishnappa	JP	36,856	57.89	T. M. Chandrashekar	INC	14,645	23.00	22,211
Mandya	102	Maddur	73.38	B. Appaji Gowda	JP	37,381	50.93	M. Manche Gowda	INC	34,047	46.39	3,334
Mandya	103	Kirugavalu	83.14	G. Made Gowda	INC	36,519	49.18	Rame Gowda	JP	35,747	48.14	772
Mandya	104	Malavalli	75.58	B. Somashekar	JP	43,497	58.28	H. D. Amaranathan	INC	28,951	38.79	14,546
Mandya	105	Mandya	64.48	S. D. Jayaram	JP	37,672	51.90	M. D. Ramesh Raju	INC	33,668	46.38	4,004
Mandya	106	Keragodu	79.65	H. D. Choudaiah	INC	35,837	52.09	G. B. Shivakumar	JP	32,101	46.66	3,736
Mandya	107	Shrirangapattana	78.11	A. S. Bandisiddegowda	JP	39,163	52.00	A. C. Srikantaiah	INC	33,416	44.37	5,747
Mandya	108	Pandavapura	77.89	K. Kempegowda	Ind	27,780	36.75	K. M. Kengegowda	INC	27,300	36.12	480
Mandya	109	Krishnarajpete	75.85	Krishna	JP	43,817	61.46	M. Puttaswamy Gowda	INC	27,482	38.54	16,335
Mysore	110	Hanur	79.80	G. Raju Gouda	Ind	36,975	46.62	H. Nagappa	JP	33,213	41.88	3,762
Mysore	111	Kollegal	64.30	B. Basavaiah	JP	27,149	46.53	M. Siddamadaiah	INC	26,037	44.63	1,112
Mysore	112	Bannur	78.69	K. J. Ramaswamy	JP	35,656	50.75	K. M. Chikkamadanaik	INC	28,114	40.01	7,542
Mysore	113	T. Narasipur	69.30	H. C. Mahadevappa	JP	33,954	55.27	Pottabasavaiah	INC	24,728	40.25	9,226
Mysore	114	Krishnaraja	51.95	Vedant Hemmige	JP	20,657	48.37	Srikanta Sharma	INC	13,965	32.70	6,692
Mysore	115	Chamaraja	50.80	K. Kempere Gowda	JP	32,077	61.36	K. Harsha Kumar	INC	16,265	31.11	15,812
Mysore	116	Narasimharaja	48.31	Mukthar Unnisa	INC	15,552	29.65	Maruthi Pawar	BJP	11,388	21.71	4,164
Mysore	117	Chamundeshwari	77.69	Siddaramaiah	JP	33,725	43.45	K. Ranganika	INC	25,454	32.80	8,271
Mysore	118	Nanjangud	70.87	D. T. Jayakumar	JP	29,644	49.49	M. Linganna	INC	25,382	42.37	4,262
Mysore	119	Santhemarahalli	72.17	B. Rachaiah	JP	31,519	51.67	M. Shivanna	INC	26,149	42.87	5,370
Mysore	120	Chamarajanagar	76.35	S. Puttaswamy	INC	33,335	40.72	M. C. Parashivappa	JP	25,625	31.30	7,710
Mysore	121	Gundlupet	71.80	K. S. Nagarathnamma	INC	40,857	60.83	H. S. Mahadeva Prasad	JP	21,717	32.34	19,140
Mysore	122	Heggadadevankote	66.11	Kote M. Shivanna	INC	26,286	39.28	H. B. Chaluvaiah	JP	24,601	36.76	1,685
Mysore	123	Hunasuru	76.99	H. L. Thimmegowda	JP	33,516	44.27	Chandraprabha Urs	INC	31,116	41.10	2,400
Mysore	124	Krishnarajanagara	72.87	S. Nanjappa	JP	33,170	50.52	H. Vishwanatha	INC	30,366	46.25	2,804
Mysore	125	Periyapatna	78.21	K. Venkatesh	JP	31,764	39.84	L. Anand	INC	21,951	27.53	9,813
Kodagu	126	Virajpet	56.28	Suma Vasantha	INC	26,716	54.90	H. D. Rajan	JP	18,496	38.01	8,220
Kodagu	127	Madikeri	68.08	D. A. Chinnappa	INC	28,645	46.94	Somaiah Ajjikuttira	JP	23,523	38.54	5,122
Kodagu	128	Somwarpet	72.90	B. A. Jivijaya	JP	38,248	50.08	A. M. Belliappa	INC	32,209	42.17	6,039
Hassan	129	Belur	67.75	H. K. Kumaraswamy	JP	33,382	58.79	H. K. Naraswmahaswamy	INC	21,669	38.16	11,713
Hassan	130	Arsikere	69.21	D. B. Gangadharappa	Ind	35,356	48.67	G. S. Basavaraju	Ind	30,148	41.50	5,208
Hassan	131	Gandasi	71.81	E. Nanje Gowda	JP	40,581	63.96	Jayalakshmi Rajannagowda	INC	21,566	33.99	19,015
Hassan	132	Shravanabelagola	74.45	N. Gangadhar	JP	44,522	51.42	N. B. Nanjappa	INC	39,155	45.22	5,367
Hassan	133	Holenarasipur	84.03	H. D. Deve Gowda	JP	41,230	49.33	G. Puttaswamy Gowda	Ind	38,063	45.54	3,167
Hassan	134	Arkalgud	75.41	K. B. Mallappa	JP	38,779	57.53	G. T. Krishna Murthy	INC	24,738	36.70	14,041
Hassan	135	Hassan	68.14	B. V. Kari Gowda	JP	43,650	53.99	G. L. Nallure Gowda	INC	32,769	40.53	10,881
Hassan	136	Sakleshpur	74.10	B. D. Basavaraju	JP	46,511	59.77	H. B. Yajaman	INC	26,997	34.69	19,514
Dakshina Kannada	137	Sullia	69.40	K. Kushala	INC	25,542	40.66	Bakila Hukrappa	JP	24,749	39.40	793
Dakshina Kannada	138	Puttur	74.15	Vinay Kumar Sorake	INC	37,426	51.46	K. Rama Bhat	BJP	16,603	22.83	20,823
Dakshina Kannada	139	Vittal	72.48	B. A. Ummarabba	INC	31,017	45.45	A. Rukmayya Poojari	BJP	23,478	34.40	7,539
Dakshina Kannada	140	Belthangady	71.23	K. Vasantha Bangera	BJP	33,378	51.11	Lokeshwari Vinayachandra	INC	27,048	41.42	6,330
Dakshina Kannada	141	Bantval	69.54	Ramanath Rai	INC	26,344	49.96	N. Shiva Rao	BJP	18,328	34.76	8,016
Dakshina Kannada	142	Mangalore	65.72	Blasius D'Souza	INC	24,494	44.43	Judith Mascarenhas	JP	15,725	28.53	8,769
Dakshina Kannada	143	Ullal	65.91	B. M. Idinabba	INC	26,184	45.81	P. Ramachandra Rao	CPI(M)	17,157	30.01	9,027
Dakshina Kannada	144	Surathkal	66.21	N. M. Adyanthaya	INC	31,846	54.59	Lokayya Shetty	JP	25,745	44.13	6,101
Dakshina Kannada	145	Kapu	64.95	Vasanth V. Salian	INC	27,356	57.38	B. Bhaskar Shetty	Ind	8,494	17.82	18,862
Dakshina Kannada	146	Udupi	68.79	Manorama Madhwaraj	INC	38,162	62.93	V. S. Acharya	BJP	22,221	36.64	15,941
Dakshina Kannada	147	Brahmavar	68.89	P. Basavaraj	INC	34,354	53.45	K. Jayaprakash Hegde	JP	26,776	41.66	7,578
Dakshina Kannada	148	Kundapura	71.56	K. Prathapachandra Shetty	INC	38,296	56.12	Appanna Hegde	JP	29,638	43.43	8,658
Dakshina Kannada	149	Byndoor	67.00	G. S. Achar	INC	28,393	48.81	Mani Gopal	JP	27,979	48.10	414
Dakshina Kannada	150	Karkala	72.89	Veerappa Moily	INC	33,330	53.19	M. K. Vijaya Kumar	BJP	28,178	44.97	5,152
Dakshina Kannada	151	Moodabidri	75.16	K. Amarnath Shetty	JP	28,683	50.71	K. Somappa Suvarna	INC	27,075	47.87	1,608
Chikmagalur	152	Sringeri	73.67	N. P. Govinda Gowda	JP	30,529	46.28	U. K. Shamanna	INC	30,446	46.16	83
Chikmagalur	153	Mudigere	64.18	B. B. Ningaiah	JP	28,600	49.12	C. Motamma	INC	28,567	49.06	33
Chikmagalur	154	Chikmagalur	68.10	B. Shankara	Ind	26,288	42.44	C. R. Sageer Ahamed	INC	22,938	37.03	3,350
Chikmagalur	155	Birur	74.01	S. R. Lakshmaiah	JP	31,405	51.24	K. S. Mallikarjuna Pasanna	INC	28,614	46.69	2,791
Chikmagalur	156	Kadur	78.64	P. B. Onkaramurthy	Ind	25,745	40.27	K. M. Krishnamurthy	JP	25,622	40.08	123
Chikmagalur	157	Tarikere	74.88	B. R. Neelakantappa	JP	40,137	54.06	S. M. Nagrajappa	INC	33,367	44.94	6,770
Shimoga	158	Channagiri	77.20	J. H. Patel	JP	35,204	49.79	N. G. Halappa	INC	32,224	45.58	2,980
Shimoga	159	Holehonnur	68.93	G. Basavannappa	JP	33,036	49.98	Kariyanna	INC	30,388	45.98	2,648
Shimoga	160	Bhadravati	66.54	Salera S. Siddappa	Ind	31,540	42.87	Isamia S.	INC	29,450	40.03	2,090
Shimoga	161	Honnali	82.96	D. G. Basavana Gowda	JP	54,076	59.91	H. B. Krishnamurthy	INC	34,399	38.11	19,677
Shimoga	162	Shimoga	63.40	K. H. Srinivasa	INC	31,472	39.96	G. Madappa	JP	21,650	27.49	9,822
Shimoga	163	Tirthahalli	75.72	Rathnakara Patamakki	INC	29,322	42.84	D. B. Chandregowda	JP	29,248	42.74	74
Shimoga	164	Hosanagar	75.14	B. Swamy Rao	INC	35,155	49.97	G. Nanjundappa	JP	32,694	46.47	2,461
Shimoga	165	Sagar	67.10	B. Dharmappa	JP	30,558	49.73	L. T. Thimmappa	INC	29,008	47.20	1,550
Shimoga	166	Soraba	74.97	Sarekoppa Bangarappa	INC	38,102	64.84	Prapulla Madhukar	JP	17,491	29.77	20,611
Shimoga	167	Shikaripura	76.49	B. S. Yediyurappa	BJP	39,077	53.52	Mahadevana Patil	INC	27,522	37.70	11,555
Uttara Kannada	168	Sirsi	70.67	Gopal Kanade	INC	32,414	46.25	Premanand Jaiwani	JP	30,955	44.17	1,459
Uttara Kannada	169	Bhatkal	62.30	Rama Naik	JP	24,621	43.07	Shambu Gouda	INC	13,890	24.30	10,731
Uttara Kannada	170	Kumta	66.68	N. H. Gouda	JP	30,959	47.76	Honnappa Nayak	INC	22,706	35.03	8,253
Uttara Kannada	171	Ankola	68.01	G. S. Hegde Ajjibal	JP	31,365	54.16	Ramakrishna Hegde	INC	22,179	38.30	9,186
Uttara Kannada	172	Karwar	59.42	Prabhakar Rane	INC	22,867	44.95	Mota Naik	JP	18,537	36.44	4,330
Uttara Kannada	173	Haliyal	71.50	R. V. Deshpande	JP	40,983	52.31	Ahmed Bashasab	INC	36,274	46.30	4,709
Dharwad	174	Dharwad Rural	72.11	Ayyappa Desai	JP	35,492	57.77	Channabasappa Pudakalakatti	INC	25,199	41.02	10,293
Dharwad	175	Dharwad	58.84	Chandrakant Bellad	Ind	15,949	25.04	Leelavati Charantimath	INC	14,662	23.02	1,287
Dharwad	176	Hubli City	69.06	A. M. Hindasageri	INC	35,856	53.32	S. S. Shettar	BJP	27,610	41.06	8,246
Dharwad	177	Hubli Rural	65.30	S. R. Bommai	JP	32,175	42.45	Gopinath Sandra	INC	30,687	40.48	1,488
Dharwad	178	Kalghatgi	75.46	Siddanagouda Chanaveeranagouda	JP	34,211	56.53	Gurushantagouda Patil	INC	24,631	40.70	9,580
Dharwad	179	Kundgol	74.91	Basappa Uppin	JP	28,038	43.77	Veerappa Kubihal	INC	21,578	33.68	6,460
Dharwad	180	Shiggaon	72.87	Neelakanthagouda Patil	Ind	35,075	51.38	Mohammed Nadaf	INC	20,736	30.38	14,339
Dharwad	181	Hangal	82.02	C. M. Udasi	JP	39,264	51.23	Manohar Tahasildar	INC	36,205	47.24	3,059
Dharwad	182	Hirekerur	76.73	U. B. Banakar	JP	36,164	52.22	D. M. Sali	INC	30,645	44.25	5,519
Dharwad	183	Ranibennur	73.06	K. B. Koliwad	INC	33,296	43.52	Basanagouda Patil	JP	32,939	43.05	357
Dharwad	184	Byadgi	73.14	Kallokappa Beelagi	JP	36,694	57.77	Heggappa Lamani	INC	26,187	41.23	10,507
Dharwad	185	Haveri	72.91	Chittaranjan Kalakoti	JP	35,564	49.74	Minaxi Girji	INC	25,628	35.84	9,936
Dharwad	186	Shirahatti	73.01	Tippanna Balikai	JP	24,362	41.77	Shankaragouda Patil	INC	21,568	36.98	2,794
Dharwad	187	Mundargi	73.06	Nagappa Humbarawadi	JP	36,764	60.62	Kuberappa Kuradgi	INC	22,023	36.31	14,741
Dharwad	188	Gadag	73.42	Kristagouda Patil	INC	39,226	53.21	Gangadharappa Rotti	JP	33,943	46.04	5,283
Dharwad	189	Ron	67.74	Jananadev Doddameti	JP	33,653	58.68	Rudragouda Patil	INC	22,911	39.95	10,742
Dharwad	190	Nargund	73.72	B. R. Yavagal	JP	36,506	68.54	S. N. Katarki	INC	16,234	30.48	20,272
Dharwad	191	Navalgund	63.86	Mallappa Kulkarni	INC	23,469	46.86	Chandrakant Kallannavar	JP	22,997	45.91	472
Belagavi	192	Ramdurg	74.71	Basavantappa Hireraddi	JP	38,425	56.45	Fakirappa Allappa	INC	28,364	41.67	10,061
Belagavi	193	Parasgad	72.31	Chandrashekhar Mamani	Ind	41,095	58.00	Ramanagouda Patil	INC	27,793	39.23	13,302
Belagavi	194	Bailhongal	77.09	Shivanand Koujalagi	JP	36,544	58.65	Ramalingappa Balekundargi	INC	25,766	41.35	10,778
Belagavi	195	Kittur	79.68	D. B. Inamdar	JP	34,921	51.26	Basavantaray Doddadouder	INC	31,138	45.71	3,783
Belagavi	196	Khanapur	63.54	Vasantrao Patil	Ind	31,298	53.82	Ramachandra Kalal	INC	15,393	26.47	15,905
Belagavi	197	Belagavi City	59.31	Rajabhau Mane	Ind	32,401	49.31	Shivajirao Kakatkar	INC	21,477	32.69	10,924
Belagavi	198	Uchagaon	59.47	Basavant Patil	Ind	35,884	57.20	Yellappa Kutre	INC	20,637	32.90	15,247
Belagavi	199	Hire Bagewadi	66.22	Shivaputrappa Malagi	JP	21,553	35.14	Govind Astekar	Ind	20,319	33.13	1,234
Belagavi	200	Gokak	68.53	Mallappa Muttennavar	JP	33,806	52.04	Ramappa Jarkiholi	INC	29,537	45.46	4,269
Belagavi	201	Arabhavi	65.18	R. M. Patil	JP	27,503	39.18	Veeranna Koujalgi	Ind	21,108	30.07	6,395
Belagavi	202	Hukkeri	75.04	Vishwanath Katti	JP	32,713	56.17	Balagoud Patil	INC	19,936	34.23	12,777
Belagavi	203	Sankeshwar	71.69	Malhargouda Patil	INC	31,643	50.65	Prabhakar Karaguppi	JP	28,627	45.82	3,016
Belagavi	204	Nippani	69.53	Veerkumar Patil	INC	46,242	74.64	Balwantrao Chavan	Ind	8,052	13.00	38,190
Belagavi	205	Sadalga	78.06	Kallappa Magennavar	JP	36,813	52.88	Prabhakar Kore	INC	32,803	47.12	4,010
Belagavi	206	Chikkodi	67.04	Shakuntala Chaugule	JP	32,257	53.56	Laxman Karale	INC	26,739	44.40	5,518
Belagavi	207	Raibag	71.45	Maruti Ghewari	JP	41,597	51.80	Shrimant Basanaik	INC	38,706	48.20	2,891
Belagavi	208	Kagwad	71.81	V. L. Patil	JP	33,707	53.59	Yashawant Huddar	INC	26,099	41.49	7,608
Belagavi	209	Athani	65.80	Leeladevi R. Prasad	JP	36,983	56.77	Yashwanthrao Pawar	INC	27,409	42.08	9,574
Bijapur	210	Jamkhandi	71.88	Gurupadappa Bagalkot	JP	44,150	53.67	Guralingappa Nyamagouda	INC	36,998	44.97	7,152
Bijapur	211	Bilgi	63.88	Baburaddi Tungal	JP	32,056	50.76	Siddanagoud Patil	INC	26,711	42.30	5,345
Bijapur	212	Mudhol	73.78	Bhimappa Jamakhandi	JP	40,656	59.89	Ashok Kattimani	INC	25,944	38.22	14,712
Bijapur	213	Bagalkot	65.59	Goolappa Mantur	JP	24,557	41.27	Rajashekhar Kanthi	INC	24,373	40.96	184
Bijapur	214	Badami	71.13	Ravasaheb Desai	JP	36,701	59.11	B. B. Chimmanakatti	INC	22,235	35.81	14,466
Bijapur	215	Guledgud	70.97	Shankrayya Nanjayynmath	INC	27,875	43.94	Veereyya Hangaragi	JP	26,202	41.30	1,673
Bijapur	216	Hungund	70.34	Shivasangappa Kadapatti	JP	30,762	52.28	Shivashankarappa Kashappanavar	INC	26,745	45.45	4,017
Bijapur	217	Muddebihal	66.80	Jagadevarao Deshmukh	JP	35,056	68.59	Basavarao Jaggal	INC	16,052	31.41	19,004
Bijapur	218	Huvina Hippargi	70.25	Shivputrappa Desai	JP	31,748	52.12	Basanagoud Patil	INC	27,949	45.89	3,799
Bijapur	219	Basavana Bagevadi	61.63	Kumaragouda Patil	JP	29,320	52.31	Bimanagouda Patil	INC	23,744	42.36	5,576
Bijapur	220	Tikota	66.87	M. B. Patil	INC	26,829	48.79	Basanagouda Patil	JP	25,914	47.13	915
Bijapur	221	Bijapur	54.82	Ustad Patel	INC	29,488	47.86	Gousmohiddin Indikar	JP	28,693	46.57	795
Bijapur	222	Ballolli	60.68	Ramesh Jigajinagi	JP	32,360	58.72	Dayanand Kondaguli	INC	21,311	38.67	11,049
Bijapur	223	Indi	61.68	Ningappa Khed	JP	30,349	54.21	Bhimanagouda Patil	INC	23,541	42.05	6,808
Bijapur	224	Sindagi	53.76	Mallanagouda Biradar	JP	31,483	61.58	Tippanna Agasar	INC	17,564	34.35	13,919
