= Nayana Motamma =

Indian politician

Member of the Karnataka Legislative Assembly
- Incumbent
- Assumed office 2023
- Preceded by: M. P. Kumaraswamy
- Constituency: Mudigere

Personal details
- Party: Indian National Congress

Nayana Motamma, née Jhawar, (1980) is an Indian politician from Karnataka. She is a member of the Indian National Congress. She became a member of the Legislative Assembly of Karnataka from Mudigere Assembly constituency which is reserved for SC community in Chikmagalur district in the 2023 Karnataka Legislative Assembly election.

== Early life and education ==
Motamma is from Mudigere, Chikmagalur district. She belongs to Dalit community. She completed her graduate in law in 2003 at National Law School of India University. Bangalore. Later, she did her LLM in 2004 at University of Pennsylvania, US. She worked as a corporate lawyer at Luthra & Luthra and with ICICI. She has been an entrepreneur. She married Bikash Jhawar, also an advocate. They have a daughter, Aarya. Before she was elected as an MLA, she was a practicing lawyer at the High Court of Karnataka. She played basketball at college level. Her mother Motamma, was a Minister of Women and Child Welfare in Karnataka.

== Career ==
Motamma is a first time MLA. She shifted from her profession as a corporate lawyer to enter politics and to avenge the defeat of her mother by BJP. She won the 2023 Karnataka Legislative Assembly election from Mudigere Assembly constituency representing Indian National Congress. She polled 50,843 votes and defeated her nearest rival, Deepak Doddaiah of Bharatiya Janata Party by a narrow margin of 722 votes. She has no cases against her and she declared assets worth Rs.10.7 crore in her affidavit to Election Commission of India. "Politics has been a great channel for me to own my identity (as Dalit) and to be able to wear it on my sleeve. Politics made me take a lot of pride in my identity," she told a popular Indian news outlet, The Wire.
