= Birur Assembly constituency =

Former Assembly constituency in Karnataka, India

Coordinates: 13.597771°N 75.972604°E

Birur
- Former constituency No. 155 for the Karnataka Legislative Assembly

Constituency details
- Country: India
- Region: South India
- State: Karnataka
- Division: Mysore
- District: Chikmagalur
- Lok Sabha constituency: Chikmagalur
- Established: 1967
- Abolished: 2008
- Reservation: None

Birur Assembly constituency was one of the constituencies in Karnataka state assembly in India until 2008 when it was made defunct. It was part of Chikmagalur Lok Sabha constituency.

== Members of the Legislative Assembly ==
Election	Member	Party
1967	M. Mallappa	Independent politician
1972	M. Mallappa	Indian National Congress
1978	M. Mallappa	Indian National Congress
1983	S. R. Lakshmaiah	Janata Party
1985	S. R. Lakshmaiah	Janata Party
1989	K. S. Mallikarjuna Pasanna	Indian National Congress
1994	S. R. Lakshmaiah	Janata Dal
1999	Mallikarjuna. K. B	Janata Dal
2004	Dharme Gowda. S. L	Janata Dal

== Election results ==
=== Assembly Election 2004 ===
2004 Karnataka Legislative Assembly election : Birur
Party	Candidate	Votes	%	±%
JD(S)	Dharme Gowda. S. L	33,164	34.59%	▲3.52
INC	Mallikarjuna. K. B	32,031	33.41%	▲9.64
JP	Devaraj. N	14,583	15.21%	New
BJP	Rekha Huliyappa Gowda. J. S	13,351	13.93%	▲6.07
Independent	Mallesha Rao	877	0.91%	New
Independent	Kantharaju	850	0.89%	New
Margin of victory		1,133	1.18%	▼5.05
Turnout		95,964	71.54%	▲3.90
Total valid votes		95,874		
Registered electors		134,140		▲3.78
JD(S) gain from JD(U)		Swing	▼2.70	

=== Assembly Election 1999 ===
1999 Karnataka Legislative Assembly election : Birur
Party	Candidate	Votes	%	±%
JD(U)	Mallikarjuna. K. B	29,864	37.29%	New
JD(S)	S. R. Lakshmaiah	24,879	31.07%	New
INC	Devaraj. N	19,039	23.77%	▼3.22
BJP	M. P. Prakashachar	6,298	7.86%	▼13.76
Margin of victory		4,985	6.23%	▼10.75
Turnout		87,421	67.64%	▼3.48
Total valid votes		80,080		
Rejected ballots		7,341	8.40%	▲6.66
Registered electors		129,250		▲11.77
JD(U) gain from JD		Swing	▼6.68	

=== Assembly Election 1994 ===
1994 Karnataka Legislative Assembly election : Birur
Party	Candidate	Votes	%	±%
JD	S. R. Lakshmaiah	35,535	43.97%	New
INC	N. K. Huchappa	21,815	26.99%	▼18.74
BJP	D. C. Sreekantappa	17,472	21.62%	New
INC	B. Somashekarappa	2,828	3.50%	New
CPI	K. N. Bommanna	2,612	3.23%	▼3.56
Margin of victory		13,720	16.98%	▼5.31
Turnout		82,250	71.12%	▼2.05
Total valid votes		80,822		
Rejected ballots		1,428	1.74%	▼5.09
Registered electors		115,644		▲6.18
JD gain from INC		Swing	▼1.76	

=== Assembly Election 1989 ===
1989 Karnataka Legislative Assembly election : Birur
Party	Candidate	Votes	%	±%
INC	K. S. Mallikarjuna Pasanna	33,954	45.73%	▼0.96
JP	S. R. Lakshmaiah	17,400	23.43%	New
Independent	B. S. Chikkabasappa	8,508	11.46%	New
Independent	Chandramma	5,308	7.15%	New
CPI	Bommanna	5,041	6.79%	New
Independent	R. Laxmaiah	2,848	3.84%	New
Margin of victory		16,554	22.29%	▲17.74
Turnout		79,692	73.17%	▼0.84
Total valid votes		74,253		
Rejected ballots		5,439	6.83%	▲5.25
Registered electors		108,917		▲29.45
INC gain from JP		Swing	▼5.51	

=== Assembly Election 1985 ===
1985 Karnataka Legislative Assembly election : Birur
Party	Candidate	Votes	%	±%
JP	S. R. Lakshmaiah	31,405	51.24%	▲3.97
INC	K. S. Mallikarjuna Pasanna	28,614	46.69%	▲0.50
Independent	U. S. Shivalinga Murthy	540	0.88%	New
Independent	Rajashekharappa	464	0.76%	New
Margin of victory		2,791	4.55%	▲3.47
Turnout		62,271	74.01%	▲6.23
Total valid votes		61,288		
Rejected ballots		983	1.58%	▼0.52
Registered electors		84,137		▲11.35
JP hold		Swing	▲3.97	

=== Assembly Election 1983 ===
1983 Karnataka Legislative Assembly election : Birur
Party	Candidate	Votes	%	±%
JP	S. R. Lakshmaiah	23,698	47.27%	▲1.62
INC	K. S. Mallikarjuna Pasanna	23,158	46.19%	▲39.62
BJP	D. C. Sreekantappa	1,695	3.38%	New
Independent	K. V. Shivamurthy	588	1.17%	New
Independent	B. Thimmaiah	535	1.07%	New
Independent	G. S. Siddappa Yena Thammanna	463	0.92%	New
Margin of victory		540	1.08%	▲0.14
Turnout		51,210	67.78%	▼7.82
Total valid votes		50,137		
Rejected ballots		1,073	2.10%	▼0.39
Registered electors		75,558		▲7.79
JP gain from INC(I)		Swing	▲0.67	

=== Assembly Election 1978 ===
1978 Karnataka Legislative Assembly election : Birur
Party	Candidate	Votes	%	±%
INC(I)	M. Mallappa	24,078	46.60%	New
JP	N. K. Huchappa	23,591	45.65%	New
INC	K. S. Mallikarjuna Pasanna	3,394	6.57%	▼46.85
Independent	U. S. Shivalinga Murthy	610	1.18%	New
Margin of victory		487	0.94%	▼5.90
Turnout		52,992	75.60%	▲11.53
Total valid votes		51,673		
Rejected ballots		1,319	2.49%	▲2.49
Registered electors		70,098		▲14.44
INC(I) gain from INC		Swing	▼6.82	

=== Assembly Election 1972 ===
1972 Mysore State Legislative Assembly election : Birur
Party	Candidate	Votes	%	±%
INC	M. Mallappa	20,333	53.42%	▲13.32
INC(O)	N. K. Huchappa	17,729	46.58%	New
Margin of victory		2,604	6.84%	▼0.43
Turnout		39,241	64.07%	▼0.62
Total valid votes		38,062		
Registered electors		61,251		▲25.30
INC gain from Independent		Swing	▲6.04	

=== Assembly Election 1967 ===
1967 Mysore State Legislative Assembly election : Birur
Party	Candidate	Votes	%	±%
Independent	M. Mallappa	13,866	47.38%	New
INC	D. H. Rudrappa	11,737	40.10%	New
PSP	K. C. Sannegowda	3,663	12.52%	New
Margin of victory		2,129	7.27%	
Turnout		31,621	64.69%	
Total valid votes		29,266		
Registered electors		48,882		
Independent win (new seat)				

== See also ==
- List of constituencies of the Karnataka Legislative Assembly
