= Kottur, Karnataka Assembly constituency =

Former Assembly constituency in Karnataka, India

Coordinates: 14.824138°N 76.222020°E

Kottur
- Former constituency for the Karnataka Legislative Assembly

Constituency details
- Country: India
- Region: South India
- State: Karnataka
- Division: Gulbarga
- District: Ballari
- Lok Sabha constituency: Bellary
- Established: 1978
- Abolished: 2008
- Reservation: None

Kottur Assembly constituency was one of the constituencies in Karnataka state assembly in India until 2008 when it was made defunct. It was part of Bellary Lok Sabha constituency.

== Members of the Legislative Assembly ==
Election	Member	Party
1978	M. M. J. Sadyoatha	Indian National Congress
1983	B. S. Veerabhadrappa	Janata Party
1985	K. V. Ravindranath Babu	Indian National Congress
1989	K. V. Ravindranath Babu	Indian National Congress
1994	T. Bhagirathi Marula Siddana Gouda	Indian National Congress
1998 By-election	T. Bhagirathi Marula Siddana Gouda	Indian National Congress
1999	T. Bhagirathi Marula Siddana Gouda	Indian National Congress
2004	T. Bhagirathi Marula Siddana Gouda	Indian National Congress

== Election results ==
=== Assembly Election 2004 ===
2004 Karnataka Legislative Assembly election : Kottur
Party	Candidate	Votes	%	±%
INC	Bhagirathi. T	29,593	27.37%	▼24.44
JD(S)	N. T. Bommanna	26,781	24.77%	▲23.67
BJP	Shetty Thindappa	16,955	15.68%	New
Independent	Harshavardana. M. M. J	14,004	12.95%	New
JP	Ravindranath. K. V	7,127	6.59%	New
KRRS	G. Veeranna	4,401	4.07%	▼0.53
BSP	Shivappa. M	3,568	3.30%	New
Independent	M. M. J. Swaroopa Nanda	2,903	2.69%	New
Independent	Koravathi Shanmukappa	1,788	1.65%	New
Margin of victory		2,812	2.60%	▼7.51
Turnout		108,187	65.69%	▼6.91
Total valid votes		108,112		
Registered electors		164,702		▲18.92
INC hold		Swing	▼24.44	

=== Assembly Election 1999 ===
1999 Karnataka Legislative Assembly election : Kottur
Party	Candidate	Votes	%	±%
INC	T. Bhagirathi Marula Siddana Gouda	49,366	51.81%	▲17.37
JD(U)	M. M. J. Swaroopa Nanda	39,732	41.70%	New
KRRS	G. Veeranna	4,386	4.60%	▼0.10
JD(S)	Budalu Basappa	1,051	1.10%	New
Independent	M. G. Swamy	739	0.78%	New
Margin of victory		9,634	10.11%	▼0.28
Turnout		100,543	72.60%	▼1.70
Total valid votes		95,274		
Rejected ballots		5,228	5.20%	▼1.06
Registered electors		138,497		▲2.13
INC hold		Swing	▲17.37	

=== Assembly By-election 1998 ===
1998 Karnataka Legislative Assembly by-election : Kottur
Party	Candidate	Votes	%	±%
INC	T. Bhagirathi Marula Siddana Gouda	32,491	34.44%	▼0.95
Lok Shakti	M. M. J. Swaroopa Nanda	22,691	24.05%	New
JD	B. Nagaraj	14,548	15.42%	▼16.64
Independent	N. T. Bommanna	13,065	13.85%	New
KTVP	K. V. Ravindranath Babu	6,597	6.99%	New
KRRS	G. Veeranna	4,436	4.70%	▼0.08
Margin of victory		9,800	10.39%	▲7.05
Turnout		100,758	74.30%	▲5.00
Total valid votes		94,331		
Rejected ballots		6,309	6.26%	▲3.37
Registered electors		135,615		▲7.93
INC hold		Swing	▼0.95	

=== Assembly Election 1994 ===
1994 Karnataka Legislative Assembly election : Kottur
Party	Candidate	Votes	%	±%
INC	T. Marulasiddana Goud	29,922	35.39%	▼9.68
JD	M. M. J. Swaroopa Nanda	27,102	32.06%	▼3.75
INC	K. V. Ravindranath Babu	20,787	24.59%	New
KRRS	Sanganna	4,041	4.78%	New
BJP	S. Thindappa	2,026	2.40%	New
Independent	K. Shanmukhappa	582	0.69%	New
Margin of victory		2,820	3.34%	▼5.92
Turnout		87,082	69.30%	▼2.63
Total valid votes		84,547		
Rejected ballots		2,516	2.89%	▼3.51
Registered electors		125,654		▲11.61
INC hold		Swing	▼9.68	

=== Assembly Election 1989 ===
1989 Karnataka Legislative Assembly election : Kottur
Party	Candidate	Votes	%	±%
INC	K. V. Ravindranath Babu	34,161	45.07%	▼6.46
JD	H. Chidanandappa	27,145	35.81%	New
JP	Kenganavara Jathappa	13,684	18.05%	New
Margin of victory		7,016	9.26%	▲4.15
Turnout		80,980	71.93%	▼1.81
Total valid votes		75,800		
Rejected ballots		5,180	6.40%	▲4.77
Registered electors		112,587		▲28.29
INC hold		Swing	▼6.46	

=== Assembly Election 1985 ===
1985 Karnataka Legislative Assembly election : Kottur
Party	Candidate	Votes	%	±%
INC	K. V. Ravindranath Babu	32,804	51.53%	▲14.70
JP	B. S. Veerabhadrappa	29,548	46.41%	▼15.44
Independent	L. Khalandar	470	0.74%	New
Margin of victory		3,256	5.11%	▼19.91
Turnout		64,713	73.74%	▲3.99
Total valid votes		63,661		
Rejected ballots		1,052	1.63%	▼0.54
Registered electors		87,762		▲7.55
INC gain from JP		Swing	▼10.32	

=== Assembly Election 1983 ===
1983 Karnataka Legislative Assembly election : Kottur
Party	Candidate	Votes	%	±%
JP	B. S. Veerabhadrappa	34,439	61.85%	▲29.06
INC	M. M. J. Sadyoatha	20,507	36.83%	▲22.55
Independent	M. G. Swamy	736	1.32%	New
Margin of victory		13,932	25.02%	▲8.67
Turnout		56,919	69.75%	▼2.58
Total valid votes		55,682		
Rejected ballots		1,237	2.17%	▼0.50
Registered electors		81,603		▲8.25
JP gain from INC(I)		Swing	▲12.71	

=== Assembly Election 1978 ===
1978 Karnataka Legislative Assembly election : Kottur
Party	Candidate	Votes	%	±%
INC(I)	M. M. J. Sadyoatha	26,076	49.14%	New
JP	B. S. Veerabhadrappa	17,401	32.79%	New
INC	T. Siddanna Goud	7,577	14.28%	New
Independent	K. Shanmukhappa	1,307	2.46%	New
Independent	H. M. Panditharadhya	357	0.67%	New
Independent	R. P. Thippeswamy Dore	349	0.66%	New
Margin of victory		8,675	16.35%	
Turnout		54,525	72.33%	
Total valid votes		53,067		
Rejected ballots		1,458	2.67%	
Registered electors		75,386		
INC(I) win (new seat)				

== See also ==
- List of constituencies of the Karnataka Legislative Assembly
