= Sadalga Assembly constituency =

Former Assembly constituency in Karnataka, India

Coordinates: 16.553771°N 74.533202°E

Sadalga
- Former constituency No. 205 for the Karnataka Legislative Assembly

Constituency details
- Country: India
- Region: South India
- State: Karnataka
- Division: Belagavi
- District: Belagavi
- Lok Sabha constituency: Chikkodi
- Established: 1957
- Abolished: 2008
- Reservation: None

Sadalga Assembly constituency was one of the constituencies in Karnataka state assembly in India until 2008 when it was made defunct. It was part of Chikkodi Lok Sabha constituency.

== Members of the Legislative Assembly ==
Election	Member	Party
1957	Khot Balaji Govind	Independent politician
1962	Shidagouda Shivagouda Patil	Indian National Congress
1967	Shidagouda Shivagouda Patil	Indian National Congress
1972	A. J. Sripal	Indian National Congress
1978	Bedage Anna Balaji	Indian National Congress
1983	Nimbalkar Ajitsingh Appasaheb	Indian National Congress
1985	Kallappa Parisha Magennavar	Janata Party
1989	Patil Veerkumar Appasaheb	Indian National Congress
1994	Prakash Hukkeri	Indian National Congress
1999	Prakash Hukkeri	Indian National Congress
2004	Prakash Hukkeri	Indian National Congress

== Election results ==
=== Assembly Election 2004 ===
2004 Karnataka Legislative Assembly election : Sadalga
Party	Candidate	Votes	%	±%
INC	Prakash Hukkeri	58,039	54.46%	▼5.37
BJP	Annasaheb Shankar Jolle	38,737	36.35%	New
BSP	Sudhir Mahadev Mali	4,240	3.98%	▲2.77
JD(S)	Bharat Devgouda Masalapure	3,371	3.16%	New
Kannada Nadu Party	Mahantesh Bheemappa Kambar	669	0.63%	New
Independent	Sunildatta Malage	651	0.61%	New
Margin of victory		19,302	18.11%	▼3.01
Turnout		106,601	79.59%	▲3.45
Total valid votes		106,569		
Registered electors		133,934		▲3.44
INC hold		Swing	▼5.37	

=== Assembly Election 1999 ===
1999 Karnataka Legislative Assembly election : Sadalga
Party	Candidate	Votes	%	±%
INC	Prakash Hukkeri	57,394	59.83%	▲11.65
JD(U)	Kallappa Parisha Magennavar	37,132	38.71%	New
BSP	M. L. Bhosale	1,163	1.21%	New
Margin of victory		20,262	21.12%	▲13.09
Turnout		98,583	76.14%	▼1.05
Total valid votes		95,927		
Rejected ballots		2,646	2.68%	▲0.66
Registered electors		129,477		▲10.49
INC hold		Swing	▲11.65	

=== Assembly Election 1994 ===
1994 Karnataka Legislative Assembly election : Sadalga
Party	Candidate	Votes	%	±%
INC	Prakash Hukkeri	42,705	48.18%	▲1.97
JD	Kallappa Parisa Magennavar	35,591	40.15%	▼3.22
INC	Ajitshinha Appasaheb Nimbalkar	7,209	8.13%	New
BJP	Chougule Annasaheb Dnyandev	1,381	1.56%	New
KRRS	Shidagouda Shivagouda Patil	965	1.09%	New
Margin of victory		7,114	8.03%	▲5.19
Turnout		90,461	77.19%	▲2.88
Total valid votes		88,635		
Rejected ballots		1,826	2.02%	▼4.62
Registered electors		117,187		▲6.26
INC hold		Swing	▲1.97	

=== Assembly Election 1989 ===
1989 Karnataka Legislative Assembly election : Sadalga
Party	Candidate	Votes	%	±%
INC	Patil Veerkumar Appasaheb	35,358	46.21%	▼0.91
JD	Kallappa Parisha Magennavar	33,185	43.37%	New
Independent	Desai Babasaheb Balagouda	7,970	10.42%	New
Margin of victory		2,173	2.84%	▼2.92
Turnout		81,959	74.31%	▼3.75
Total valid votes		76,513		
Rejected ballots		5,446	6.64%	▲5.38
Registered electors		110,287		▲22.11
INC gain from JP		Swing	▼6.67	

=== Assembly Election 1985 ===
1985 Karnataka Legislative Assembly election : Sadalga
Party	Candidate	Votes	%	±%
JP	Kallappa Parisha Magennavar	36,813	52.88%	New
INC	Kore Prabhakar Basaprabhu	32,803	47.12%	▼6.53
Margin of victory		4,010	5.76%	▼4.65
Turnout		70,506	78.06%	▲5.01
Total valid votes		69,616		
Rejected ballots		890	1.26%	▼0.87
Registered electors		90,319		▲11.34
JP gain from INC		Swing	▼0.77	

=== Assembly Election 1983 ===
1983 Karnataka Legislative Assembly election : Sadalga
Party	Candidate	Votes	%	±%
INC	Nimbalkar Ajitsingh Appasaheb	31,114	53.65%	▲41.17
Independent	Patil Malagouda Annasab	25,076	43.24%	New
BJP	Chaugala Dhanapal Bapu	1,083	1.87%	New
Independent	Phakire Mohanrao Annasaheb	633	1.09%	New
Margin of victory		6,038	10.41%	▼17.82
Turnout		59,261	73.05%	▼6.12
Total valid votes		57,997		
Rejected ballots		1,264	2.13%	▼0.22
Registered electors		81,123		▲7.32
INC gain from INC(I)		Swing	▼3.84	

=== Assembly Election 1978 ===
1978 Karnataka Legislative Assembly election : Sadalga
Party	Candidate	Votes	%	±%
INC(I)	Bedage Anna Balaji	33,598	57.49%	New
JP	Patil Raosaheb Payagouda	17,099	29.26%	New
INC	Mirje Shantappa Yeshwantappa	7,293	12.48%	▼69.89
Independent	Patil Appasaheb Chandagouda	448	0.77%	New
Margin of victory		16,499	28.23%	▼38.42
Turnout		59,846	79.17%	▲12.75
Total valid votes		58,438		
Rejected ballots		1,408	2.35%	▲2.35
Registered electors		75,590		▲11.94
INC(I) gain from INC		Swing	▼24.88	

=== Assembly Election 1972 ===
1972 Mysore State Legislative Assembly election : Sadalga
Party	Candidate	Votes	%	±%
INC	A. J. Sripal	35,857	82.37%	▲22.18
ABJS	V. B. Bashetteppa	6,842	15.72%	New
Independent	Adagouda Balagouda Patil	832	1.91%	New
Margin of victory		29,015	66.65%	▲41.17
Turnout		44,848	66.42%	▼10.44
Total valid votes		43,531		
Registered electors		67,525		▲15.94
INC hold		Swing	▲22.18	

=== Assembly Election 1967 ===
1967 Mysore State Legislative Assembly election : Sadalga
Party	Candidate	Votes	%	±%
INC	Shidagouda Shivagouda Patil	25,518	60.19%	▼2.12
Independent	U. C. Balapa	14,713	34.70%	New
SWA	C. S. Iarapa	2,167	5.11%	New
Margin of victory		10,805	25.48%	▼9.32
Turnout		44,763	76.86%	▲2.16
Total valid votes		42,398		
Registered electors		58,241		▲10.46
INC hold		Swing	▼2.12	

=== Assembly Election 1962 ===
1962 Mysore State Legislative Assembly election : Sadalga
Party	Candidate	Votes	%	±%
INC	Shidagouda Shivagouda Patil	23,092	62.31%	▲12.57
Independent	Krishna Balappa Telavekar	10,195	27.51%	New
PSP	Shanker Laxman Benadikar	3,773	10.18%	New
Margin of victory		12,897	34.80%	▲34.28
Turnout		39,386	74.70%	▼0.26
Total valid votes		37,060		
Registered electors		52,725		▲12.15
INC gain from Independent		Swing	▲12.05	

=== Assembly Election 1957 ===
1957 Mysore State Legislative Assembly election : Sadalga
Party	Candidate	Votes	%	±%
Independent	Khot Balaji Govind	17,714	50.26%	New
INC	Gunjal Padmappa Hiriyappa	17,529	49.74%	New
Margin of victory		185	0.52%	
Turnout		35,243	74.96%	
Total valid votes		35,243		
Registered electors		47,015		
Independent win (new seat)				

== See also ==
- List of constituencies of the Karnataka Legislative Assembly
