= Holehonnur Assembly constituency =

Former Assembly constituency in Karnataka, India

Coordinates: 13.987709°N 75.687507°E

Holehonnur
- Former constituency No. 159 for the Karnataka Legislative Assembly

Constituency details
- Country: India
- Region: South India
- State: Karnataka
- Division: Bangalore
- District: Shimoga
- Lok Sabha constituency: Shimoga
- Established: 1978
- Abolished: 2008
- Reservation: SC

Holehonnur Assembly constituency was one of the constituencies in Karnataka state assembly in India until 2008 when it was made defunct. It was part of Shimoga Lok Sabha constituency.

== Members of the Legislative Assembly ==
Election	Member	Party
1978	G. Basavannappa	Indian National Congress
1983	G. Basavannappa	Janata Party
1985	G. Basavannappa	Janata Party
1989	Kariyanna	Indian National Congress
1994	G. Basavannappa	Janata Dal
1999	Kariyanna	Indian National Congress
2004	G. Basavannappa	Bharatiya Janata Party

== Election results ==
=== Assembly Election 2004 ===
2004 Karnataka Legislative Assembly election : Holehonnur
Party	Candidate	Votes	%	±%
BJP	G. Basavannappa	50,071	44.73%	New
INC	Kariyanna	43,769	39.10%	▼7.02
JD(S)	Chuda Naika	12,132	10.84%	▲6.73
JP	Chandrasena Chowhan Mr	2,476	2.21%	New
Independent	Chandra Naika. B	1,438	1.28%	New
Kannada Nadu Party	Shridhara. S. P	1,021	0.91%	New
Margin of victory		6,302	5.63%	▼10.31
Turnout		111,956	71.18%	▼0.28
Total valid votes		111,944		
Registered electors		157,285		▲10.54
BJP gain from INC		Swing	▼1.39	

=== Assembly Election 1999 ===
1999 Karnataka Legislative Assembly election : Holehonnur
Party	Candidate	Votes	%	±%
INC	Kariyanna	44,512	46.12%	▲21.98
JD(U)	G. Basavannappa	29,123	30.17%	New
Independent	H. Chooda Naik	15,125	15.67%	New
JD(S)	B. T. Lalitha Naik	3,964	4.11%	New
Independent	M. Kariyappa	2,249	2.33%	New
Independent	A. K. Hanumanthappa	1,543	1.60%	New
Margin of victory		15,389	15.94%	▲14.04
Turnout		101,686	71.46%	▼1.51
Total valid votes		96,516		
Rejected ballots		5,064	4.98%	▲2.86
Registered electors		142,292		▲5.76
INC gain from JD		Swing	▲20.08	

=== Assembly Election 1994 ===
1994 Karnataka Legislative Assembly election : Holehonnur
Party	Candidate	Votes	%	±%
JD	G. Basavannappa	24,999	26.04%	▲6.85
INC	Kariyanna	23,174	24.14%	▼21.30
Kranti Sabha	H. Chooda Naik	23,047	24.01%	▼2.95
BJP	S. Lakshmana Naik	15,182	15.82%	▲12.52
INC	K. G. Chenna Naik	6,674	6.95%	New
SP	Ganesh	1,098	1.14%	New
Independent	Gurusidda Swamy	647	0.67%	New
JP	Parashurama Naik	631	0.66%	New
Margin of victory		1,825	1.90%	▼16.59
Turnout		98,176	72.97%	▲3.02
Total valid votes		95,996		
Rejected ballots		2,080	2.12%	▼4.11
Registered electors		134,545		▲3.69
JD gain from INC		Swing	▼19.40	

=== Assembly Election 1989 ===
1989 Karnataka Legislative Assembly election : Holehonnur
Party	Candidate	Votes	%	±%
INC	Kariyanna	38,674	45.44%	▼0.54
Kranti Sabha	H. Chooda Naik	22,940	26.96%	New
JD	K. G. R. Naik	16,328	19.19%	New
JP	K. B. Ramachandra Naik	2,979	3.50%	New
BJP	K. Swamy	2,805	3.30%	New
Margin of victory		15,734	18.49%	▲14.48
Turnout		90,758	69.95%	▲1.02
Total valid votes		85,102		
Rejected ballots		5,656	6.23%	▲4.48
Registered electors		129,751		▲32.94
INC gain from JP		Swing	▼4.54	

=== Assembly Election 1985 ===
1985 Karnataka Legislative Assembly election : Holehonnur
Party	Candidate	Votes	%	±%
JP	G. Basavannappa	33,036	49.98%	▼2.26
INC	Kariyanna	30,388	45.98%	▲1.81
Independent	Subbalaxmi	1,020	1.54%	New
Independent	Halanaik. H	870	1.32%	New
Independent	K. G. Chenna Naik	443	0.67%	New
Margin of victory		2,648	4.01%	▼4.06
Turnout		67,275	68.93%	▲4.86
Total valid votes		66,095		
Rejected ballots		1,180	1.75%	▼0.85
Registered electors		97,601		▲5.87
JP hold		Swing	▼2.26	

=== Assembly Election 1983 ===
1983 Karnataka Legislative Assembly election : Holehonnur
Party	Candidate	Votes	%	±%
JP	G. Basavannappa	30,056	52.24%	▲11.97
INC	K. G. Chenna Naik	25,413	44.17%	▲38.58
BJP	A. K. Hanumanthappa	965	1.68%	New
Independent	Shekarappa. B	501	0.87%	New
Independent	Yellappa. P	373	0.65%	New
Margin of victory		4,643	8.07%	▼2.09
Turnout		59,068	64.07%	▼7.21
Total valid votes		57,535		
Rejected ballots		1,533	2.60%	▼0.23
Registered electors		92,186		▲14.34
JP gain from INC(I)		Swing	▲1.81	

=== Assembly Election 1978 ===
1978 Karnataka Legislative Assembly election : Holehonnur
Party	Candidate	Votes	%	±%
INC(I)	G. Basavannappa	28,160	50.43%	New
JP	K. G. Chenna Naik	22,487	40.27%	New
INC	K. T. Krishna Naik	3,122	5.59%	New
Independent	M. Munirathanam	864	1.55%	New
Independent	N. K. Maruthy	651	1.17%	New
Independent	Narasimaiah	558	1.00%	New
Margin of victory		5,673	10.16%	
Turnout		57,467	71.28%	
Total valid votes		55,842		
Rejected ballots		1,625	2.83%	
Registered electors		80,621		
INC(I) win (new seat)				

== See also ==
- List of constituencies of the Karnataka Legislative Assembly
