= Mudigere Assembly constituency =

Legislative Assembly constituency in Karnataka State, India

Coordinates: 13.14°N 75.64°E

Mudigere
- Constituency No. 124 for the Karnataka Legislative Assembly

Constituency details
- Country: India
- Region: South India
- State: Karnataka
- District: Chikmagalur
- Lok Sabha constituency: Udupi Chikmagalur
- Established: 1961
- Total electors: 172,084
- Reservation: SC

Member of Legislative Assembly
- 16th Karnataka Legislative Assembly
- Incumbent Nayana Motamma
- Party: Indian National Congress
- Elected year: 2023
- Preceded by: M. P. Kumaraswamy

Mudigere Assembly constituency is one of the 224 Legislative Assembly constituencies of Karnataka in India.

It is part of Chikmagalur district and is reserved for candidates belonging to the Scheduled Castes.

== Members of the Legislative Assembly ==
Election	Member	Party
1962	K. H. Ranganath	Praja Socialist Party
1967	K. H. Ranganath	Praja Socialist Party
1972	G. Puttuswamy	Indian National Congress
1978	C. Motamma	Indian National Congress
1983	P. Thippaiah	Janata Party
1985	B. B. Ningaiah	Janata Party
1989	C. Motamma	Indian National Congress
1994	B. B. Ningaiah	Janata Dal
1999	C. Motamma	Indian National Congress
2004	M. P. Kumaraswamy	Bharatiya Janata Party
2008	M. P. Kumaraswamy	Bharatiya Janata Party
2013	B. B. Ningaiah	Janata Dal
2018	M. P. Kumaraswamy	Bharatiya Janata Party
2023	Nayana Motamma	Indian National Congress

== Election results ==
=== Assembly Election 2023 ===
2023 Karnataka Legislative Assembly election : Mudigere
Party	Candidate	Votes	%	±%
INC	Nayana Motamma	50,843	38.00	▲2.76
BJP	Deepak Doddaiah	50,121	37.46	▼7.30
JD(S)	M. P. Kumaraswamy	26,038	19.46	▲2.66
CPI	Ramesh Kelagur	2,785	2.08	New
NOTA	None of the above	1,166	0.87	▼0.14
BSP	Lokavalli Ramesh	933	0.70	New
Margin of victory		722	0.54	▼8.99
Turnout		134,115	77.94	▲0.76
Total valid votes		133,811		
Registered electors		172,084		▲1.09
INC gain from BJP		Swing	▼6.76	

=== Assembly Election 2018 ===
2018 Karnataka Legislative Assembly election : Mudigere
Party	Candidate	Votes	%	±%
BJP	M. P. Kumaraswamy	58,783	44.76	▲23.68
INC	C. Motamma	46,271	35.24	▲12.38
JD(S)	B. B. Ningaiah	22,063	16.80	▼6.51
NOTA	None of the above	1,321	1.01	New
AIMEP	Anilkumar. N. G	988	0.75	New
Margin of victory		12,512	9.53	▲9.07
Turnout		131,369	77.18	▲5.01
Total valid votes		131,318		
Registered electors		170,221		▲11.43
BJP gain from JD(S)		Swing	▲21.45	

=== Assembly Election 2013 ===
2013 Karnataka Legislative Assembly election : Mudigere
Party	Candidate	Votes	%	±%
JD(S)	B. B. Ningaiah	32,417	23.31	▲10.10
INC	B. N. Chandrappa	31,782	22.86	▼3.27
BJP	M. P. Kumaraswamy	29,309	21.08	▼13.56
CPI	Saathi Sundaresh	12,721	9.15	▼0.85
BSP	U. B. Manjaiah	1,660	1.19	▼10.56
Independent	B. M. Ramesh Byrigadde	1,062	0.76	New
Margin of victory		635	0.46	▼8.05
Turnout		110,249	72.17	▲2.04
Total valid votes		139,045		
Registered electors		152,759		▲7.27
JD(S) gain from BJP		Swing	▼11.33	

=== Assembly Election 2008 ===
2008 Karnataka Legislative Assembly election : Mudigere
Party	Candidate	Votes	%	±%
BJP	M. P. Kumaraswamy	34,579	34.64	▲3.16
INC	B. N. Chandrappa	26,084	26.13	▼3.80
JD(S)	H. K. Kalaiah	13,182	13.21	▼4.98
BSP	B. B. Ningaiah	11,724	11.75	New
CPI	Saathi Sundaresh	9,982	10.00	▼7.43
Independent	N. U. Sagunaiah	2,566	2.57	New
Independent	Comrede C. E. Basavaraju	956	0.96	New
Independent	B. Thippeswamy	740	0.74	New
Margin of victory		8,495	8.51	▲6.96
Turnout		99,873	70.13	▼0.22
Total valid votes		99,813		
Registered electors		142,410		▲16.17
BJP hold		Swing	▲3.16	

=== Assembly Election 2004 ===
2004 Karnataka Legislative Assembly election : Mudigere
Party	Candidate	Votes	%	±%
BJP	M. P. Kumaraswamy	27,148	31.48	▲0.51
INC	C. Motamma	25,810	29.93	▼21.87
JD(S)	B. B. Ningaiah	15,684	18.19	▲16.86
CPI	Saathi Sundaresh	15,030	17.43	▲4.47
Independent	Ramesh. B. M	1,551	1.80	New
Kannada Nadu Party	Krishna Ms	1,017	1.18	New
Margin of victory		1,338	1.55	▼19.28
Turnout		86,240	70.35	▲3.27
Total valid votes		86,240		
Registered electors		122,584		▲0.80
BJP gain from INC		Swing	▼20.32	

=== Assembly Election 1999 ===
1999 Karnataka Legislative Assembly election : Mudigere
Party	Candidate	Votes	%	±%
INC	C. Motamma	40,574	51.80	▲14.27
BJP	M. P. Kumaraswamy	24,258	30.97	▲12.05
CPI	Saathi Sundaresh	10,154	12.96	New
JD(U)	B. B. Ningaiah	2,307	2.95	New
JD(S)	B. R. Subbaiah	1,038	1.33	New
Margin of victory		16,316	20.83	▲16.67
Turnout		81,578	67.08	▲1.01
Total valid votes		78,331		
Rejected ballots		3,247	3.98	▲2.52
Registered electors		121,612		▲3.85
INC gain from JD		Swing	▲10.12	

=== Assembly Election 1994 ===
1994 Karnataka Legislative Assembly election : Mudigere
Party	Candidate	Votes	%	±%
JD	B. B. Ningaiah	31,773	41.68	▲21.68
INC	C. Motamma	28,604	37.53	▼17.43
BJP	H. S. Ramaswamy	14,424	18.92	New
INC	S. Kamalamma	1,187	1.56	New
Margin of victory		3,169	4.16	▼30.81
Turnout		77,368	66.07	▼0.90
Total valid votes		76,222		
Rejected ballots		1,127	1.46	▼4.55
Registered electors		117,099		▼0.08
JD gain from INC		Swing	▼13.28	

=== Assembly Election 1989 ===
1989 Karnataka Legislative Assembly election : Mudigere
Party	Candidate	Votes	%	±%
INC	C. Motamma	40,540	54.96	▲5.90
JD	B. B. Ningaiah	14,749	20.00	New
JP	B. E. Billiyappa	14,159	19.20	New
Independent	M. D. Gangaiah	2,618	3.55	New
Independent	Prabhuswamy	622	0.84	New
Independent	H. K. Bommaiah	562	0.76	New
Margin of victory		25,791	34.97	▲34.91
Turnout		78,479	66.97	▲2.79
Total valid votes		73,762		
Rejected ballots		4,717	6.01	▲4.84
Registered electors		117,189		▲27.66
INC gain from JP		Swing	▲5.84	

=== Assembly Election 1985 ===
1985 Karnataka Legislative Assembly election : Mudigere
Party	Candidate	Votes	%	±%
JP	B. B. Ningaiah	28,600	49.12	▲0.66
INC	C. Motamma	28,567	49.06	▲2.27
BJP	C. Nanjappa	1,056	1.81	New
Margin of victory		33	0.06	▼1.61
Turnout		58,915	64.18	▲10.73
Total valid votes		58,223		
Rejected ballots		692	1.17	▼0.84
Registered electors		91,801		▲11.87
JP hold		Swing	▲0.66	

=== Assembly Election 1983 ===
1983 Karnataka Legislative Assembly election : Mudigere
Party	Candidate	Votes	%	±%
JP	P. Thippaiah	20,830	48.46	▲17.12
INC	C. Motamma	20,111	46.79	▲44.70
LKD	L. H. Hanumanthappa	1,862	4.33	New
Margin of victory		719	1.67	▼33.56
Turnout		43,864	53.45	▼19.57
Total valid votes		42,984		
Rejected ballots		880	2.01	▼1.31
Registered electors		82,061		▲12.98
JP gain from INC(I)		Swing	▼18.11	

=== Assembly Election 1978 ===
1978 Karnataka Legislative Assembly election : Mudigere
Party	Candidate	Votes	%	±%
INC(I)	C. Motamma	34,449	66.57	New
JP	N. U. Sagunaiah	16,217	31.34	New
INC	G. Puttuswamy	1,080	2.09	▼84.83
Margin of victory		18,232	35.23	▼38.61
Turnout		53,039	73.02	▲20.65
Total valid votes		51,746		
Rejected ballots		1,761	3.32	▲3.32
Registered electors		72,632		▲29.70
INC(I) gain from INC		Swing	▼20.35	

=== Assembly Election 1972 ===
1972 Mysore State Legislative Assembly election : Mudigere
Party	Candidate	Votes	%	±%
INC	G. Puttuswamy	24,425	86.92	▲38.63
INC(O)	B. M. Shamanaika	3,676	13.08	New
Margin of victory		20,749	73.84	▲70.43
Turnout		29,324	52.37	▼5.08
Total valid votes		28,101		
Registered electors		55,998		▲27.59
INC gain from PSP		Swing	▲35.21	

=== Assembly Election 1967 ===
1967 Mysore State Legislative Assembly election : Mudigere
Party	Candidate	Votes	%	±%
PSP	K. H. Ranganath	12,213	51.71	▲4.52
INC	G. Puttuswamy	11,407	48.29	▲1.32
Margin of victory		806	3.41	▲3.18
Turnout		25,212	57.45	▲14.18
Total valid votes		23,620		
Registered electors		43,888		▼20.74
PSP hold		Swing	▲4.52	

=== Assembly Election 1962 ===
1962 Mysore State Legislative Assembly election : Mudigere
Party	Candidate	Votes	%	±%
PSP	K. H. Ranganath	10,423	47.19	New
INC	L. H. Thimmabhovi	10,373	46.97	New
Independent	D. Doddaiah	1,290	5.84	New
Margin of victory		50	0.23	
Turnout		23,958	43.27	
Total valid votes		22,086		
Registered electors		55,372		
PSP win (new seat)				

== See also ==
- List of constituencies of the Karnataka Legislative Assembly
- Chikmagalur district
