= Keragodu Assembly constituency =

Former Assembly constituency in Karnataka, India

Coordinates: 12.828261°N 77.033901°E

Keragodu
- Former constituency for the Karnataka Legislative Assembly

Constituency details
- Country: India
- Region: South India
- State: Karnataka
- Division: Mysore
- District: Mandya
- Lok Sabha constituency: Mandya
- Established: 1978
- Abolished: 2008
- Reservation: None

Keragodu Assembly constituency was one of the constituencies in Karnataka state assembly in India until 2008 when it was made defunct. It was part of Mandya Lok Sabha constituency.

== Members of the Legislative Assembly ==
Election	Member	Party
1978	H. D. Choudaiah	Janata Party
1983	H. D. Choudaiah	Indian National Congress
1985	H. D. Choudaiah	Indian National Congress
1989	N. Thammanna	Indian National Congress
1994	G. B. Shivakumar	Janata Dal
1999	H. D. Choudaiah	Independent politician
2004	Ramu. H. B	Indian National Congress

== Election results ==
=== Assembly Election 2004 ===
2004 Karnataka Legislative Assembly election : Keragodu
Party	Candidate	Votes	%	±%
INC	Ramu. H. B	39,842	44.98%	▲3.31
JD(S)	Shiva Kumar. G. B	27,366	30.90%	New
BJP	Nagarajappa	10,036	11.33%	▼4.09
JP	R. Yogish @ Shambugowda	4,142	4.68%	New
BSP	Venkatagiriyaiah	3,711	4.19%	New
KRRS	Shivaramu. H. C	2,019	2.28%	New
LJP	C. M. Dyavappa	843	0.95%	New
Kannada Nadu Party	Shiva Basavaiah. M. V	614	0.69%	New
Margin of victory		12,476	14.09%	▲12.84
Turnout		88,659	72.54%	▼4.93
Total valid votes		88,573		
Registered electors		122,224		▲7.97
INC gain from Independent		Swing	▲2.06	

=== Assembly Election 1999 ===
1999 Karnataka Legislative Assembly election : Keragodu
Party	Candidate	Votes	%	±%
Independent	H. D. Choudaiah	35,579	42.92%	New
INC	D. B. Ramu	34,543	41.67%	▲24.10
BJP	Nagarajappa	12,780	15.42%	▲11.30
Margin of victory		1,036	1.25%	▼38.17
Turnout		87,704	77.47%	▼1.14
Total valid votes		82,902		
Rejected ballots		4,802	5.48%	▲3.73
Registered electors		113,207		▲3.54
Independent gain from JD		Swing	▼14.07	

=== Assembly Election 1994 ===
1994 Karnataka Legislative Assembly election : Keragodu
Party	Candidate	Votes	%	±%
JD	G. B. Shivakumar	48,124	56.99%	▲48.56
INC	M. D. Ramesh Raju	14,838	17.57%	▼22.74
KRRS	Marilinge Gowda	10,106	11.97%	New
BSP	K. N. Guruprasad	4,602	5.45%	New
BJP	Basavegowda	3,482	4.12%	New
INC	B. S. Shivarame Gowda	2,456	2.91%	New
Margin of victory		33,286	39.42%	▲28.95
Turnout		85,955	78.61%	▲0.92
Total valid votes		84,449		
Rejected ballots		1,506	1.75%	▼3.73
Registered electors		109,338		▲5.86
JD gain from INC		Swing	▲16.68	

=== Assembly Election 1989 ===
1989 Karnataka Legislative Assembly election : Keragodu
Party	Candidate	Votes	%	±%
INC	N. Thammanna	30,575	40.31%	▼11.78
JP	G. B. Shivakumar	22,634	29.84%	New
Kranti Sabha	Marilinge Gowda	15,493	20.43%	New
JD	K. S. Sachidanandha	6,392	8.43%	New
Independent	Revananjundaswamy	558	0.74%	New
Margin of victory		7,941	10.47%	▲5.04
Turnout		80,239	77.69%	▼1.96
Total valid votes		75,841		
Rejected ballots		4,398	5.48%	▲4.20
Registered electors		103,285		▲18.04
INC hold		Swing	▼11.78	

=== Assembly Election 1985 ===
1985 Karnataka Legislative Assembly election : Keragodu
Party	Candidate	Votes	%	±%
INC	H. D. Choudaiah	35,837	52.09%	▼2.55
JP	G. B. Shivakumar	32,101	46.66%	▲1.30
Independent	C. Boraiah	864	1.26%	New
Margin of victory		3,736	5.43%	▼3.85
Turnout		69,697	79.65%	▼1.76
Total valid votes		68,802		
Rejected ballots		895	1.28%	▼0.54
Registered electors		87,503		▲17.65
INC hold		Swing	▼2.55	

=== Assembly Election 1983 ===
1983 Karnataka Legislative Assembly election : Keragodu
Party	Candidate	Votes	%	±%
INC	H. D. Chowdiah	32,483	54.64%	▲43.45
JP	K. V. Shankara Gowda	26,966	45.36%	▼16.26
Margin of victory		5,517	9.28%	▼26.35
Turnout		60,550	81.41%	▼1.80
Total valid votes		59,449		
Rejected ballots		1,101	1.82%	▼0.19
Registered electors		74,374		▲8.27
INC gain from JP		Swing	▼6.98	

=== Assembly Election 1978 ===
1978 Karnataka Legislative Assembly election : Keragodu
Party	Candidate	Votes	%	±%
JP	H. D. Choudaiah	34,515	61.62%	New
INC(I)	M. D. Siddaramaiah	14,556	25.99%	New
INC	G. Puttaswamy	6,266	11.19%	New
Independent	M. Ramalingaiah	675	1.21%	New
Margin of victory		19,959	35.63%	
Turnout		57,161	83.21%	
Total valid votes		56,012		
Rejected ballots		1,149	2.01%	
Registered electors		68,692		
JP win (new seat)				

== See also ==
- List of constituencies of the Karnataka Legislative Assembly
