= Binnypet Assembly constituency =

Former Assembly constituency in Karnataka, India

Coordinates: 12.967°N 77.558°E

Binnypet
- Former constituency for the Karnataka Legislative Assembly

Constituency details
- Country: India
- Region: South India
- State: Karnataka
- District: Bangalore Urban
- Lok Sabha constituency: Bangalore North
- Established: 1978
- Abolished: 2008
- Reservation: None

Binnypet Assembly constituency was one of the 224 constituencies in the Karnataka Legislative Assembly of Karnataka, a southern state of India. It was a part of Bangalore North Lok Sabha constituency.

== Members of the Legislative Assembly ==
Election	Member	Party
1978	I. P. D. Salappa	Indian National Congress
1983	G. Narayana Kumar	Janata Party
1985	G. Narayana Kumar	Janata Party
1989	Naseer Ahmed	Indian National Congress
1994	V. Somanna	Janata Dal
1999	V. Somanna	Independent politician
2004	V. Somanna	Indian National Congress

== Election results ==
=== Assembly Election 2004 ===
2004 Karnataka Legislative Assembly election : Binnypet
Party	Candidate	Votes	%	±%
INC	V. Somanna	77,657	42.68%	▲16.38
BJP	M. C. Aswathanarayana	50,737	27.88%	▲0.66
JD(S)	Abdul Azeem	47,786	26.26%	▲22.83
BSP	Venkatalakshmaiah. G	2,110	1.16%	▼0.04
Margin of victory		26,920	14.80%	▲1.54
Turnout		181,977	48.43%	▼8.35
Total valid votes		181,953		
Registered electors		375,753		▲16.32
INC gain from Independent		Swing	▲2.20	

=== Assembly Election 1999 ===
1999 Karnataka Legislative Assembly election : Binnypet
Party	Candidate	Votes	%	±%
Independent	V. Somanna	73,974	40.48%	New
BJP	M. C. Aswathanarayana	49,736	27.22%	▲13.59
INC	Sayyeed Ahmed. Y	48,055	26.30%	▲16.03
JD(S)	Krishnappa. B	6,274	3.43%	New
BSP	Venkatalakshmaiah. G	2,202	1.20%	New
JD(U)	G. Narayana Kumar	1,660	0.91%	New
Margin of victory		24,238	13.26%	▼16.71
Turnout		183,420	56.78%	▼5.10
Total valid votes		182,741		
Rejected ballots		11	0.01%	▼1.26
Registered electors		323,037		▲18.34
Independent gain from JD		Swing	▼8.90	

=== Assembly Election 1994 ===
1994 Karnataka Legislative Assembly election : Binnypet
Party	Candidate	Votes	%	±%
JD	V. Somanna	82,354	49.38%	▲35.08
INC	Naseer Ahmed	32,369	19.41%	New
BJP	Vimala Gowda	22,732	13.63%	▲9.31
INC	Saleem Ahmed	17,127	10.27%	▼33.47
Independent	D. Krishnappa	7,692	4.61%	New
Independent	G. Narayana Kumar	1,813	1.09%	New
Independent	K. C. Shivanna	1,069	0.64%	New
Margin of victory		49,985	29.97%	▲19.29
Turnout		168,910	61.88%	▲4.16
Total valid votes		166,771		
Rejected ballots		2,139	1.27%	▼2.92
Registered electors		272,985		▲7.75
JD gain from INC		Swing	▲5.64	

=== Assembly Election 1989 ===
1989 Karnataka Legislative Assembly election : Binnypet
Party	Candidate	Votes	%	±%
INC	Naseer Ahmed	61,285	43.74%	▲4.39
JP	V. Somanna	46,322	33.06%	New
JD	G. Narayana Kumar	20,042	14.30%	New
BJP	M. Thimmaiah	6,057	4.32%	▼3.68
BSP	Venkatalakshmaiah. G	2,050	1.46%	New
Independent	Vatal Nagaraj	928	0.66%	New
Margin of victory		14,963	10.68%	▲7.90
Turnout		146,239	57.72%	▲5.15
Total valid votes		140,118		
Rejected ballots		6,121	4.19%	▲3.27
Registered electors		253,350		▲46.33
INC gain from JP		Swing	▲1.61	

=== Assembly Election 1985 ===
1985 Karnataka Legislative Assembly election : Binnypet
Party	Candidate	Votes	%	±%
JP	G. Narayana Kumar	37,990	42.13%	▼3.20
INC	Soukat Kureshi	35,484	39.35%	▲20.48
BJP	M. C. Aswathanarayana	7,215	8.00%	▲3.81
LKD	L. Kumara Swamy	2,936	3.26%	▼1.78
Independent	D. Krishnappa	2,365	2.62%	New
Independent	P. Wincent	1,565	1.74%	New
Independent	Sattar Sherief	948	1.05%	New
Margin of victory		2,506	2.78%	▼23.68
Turnout		91,011	52.57%	▼10.95
Total valid votes		90,178		
Rejected ballots		833	0.92%	▼1.14
Registered electors		173,131		▲18.22
JP hold		Swing	▼3.20	

=== Assembly Election 1983 ===
1983 Karnataka Legislative Assembly election : Binnypet
Party	Candidate	Votes	%	±%
JP	G. Narayana Kumar	41,291	45.33%	▲20.68
INC	I. P. D. Salappa	17,187	18.87%	▲17.43
Independent	Haji Shariff Saheb	16,436	18.04%	New
LKD	V. R. Rajashekhara Kasave	4,589	5.04%	New
BJP	M. Thimmaiah	3,821	4.19%	New
Independent	A. P. Selavaraj	1,949	2.14%	New
Independent	K. Prabhakar Reddy	1,102	1.21%	New
Independent	Vatal Nagaraj	820	0.90%	New
Independent	H. V. Ramadas	778	0.85%	New
Margin of victory		24,104	26.46%	▲6.44
Turnout		93,013	63.52%	▲3.26
Total valid votes		91,097		
Rejected ballots		1,916	2.06%	▼0.10
Registered electors		146,442		▲37.55
JP gain from INC(I)		Swing	▲0.66	

=== Assembly Election 1978 ===
1978 Karnataka Legislative Assembly election : Binnypet
Party	Candidate	Votes	%	±%
INC(I)	I. P. D. Salappa	28,037	44.67%	New
JP	K. Prabhakar Reddy	15,474	24.65%	New
Independent	Gnamba Vatal Nagaraj	14,655	23.35%	New
Independent	B. M. Aswathanarayana	1,242	1.98%	New
INC	Showkat Qureshi	906	1.44%	New
Independent	Ameet Pasha	805	1.28%	New
Independent	Mohamed Mustafa	430	0.69%	New
Independent	G. Srinivasan	402	0.64%	New
Margin of victory		12,563	20.02%	
Turnout		64,154	60.26%	
Total valid votes		62,767		
Rejected ballots		1,387	2.16%	
Registered electors		106,461		
INC(I) win (new seat)				

== See also ==
- Bangalore Urban district
- List of constituencies of Karnataka Legislative Assembly
