= Jayamahal Assembly constituency =

Former constituency in Karnataka, India

Coordinates: 13.003°N 77.589°E

Jayamahal
- Former constituency for the Karnataka Legislative Assembly

Constituency details
- Country: India
- Region: South India
- State: Karnataka
- District: Bangalore Urban
- Lok Sabha constituency: Bangalore North
- Established: 1978
- Abolished: 2008
- Reservation: None

Jayamahal Assembly constituency was one of the 224 constituencies in the Karnataka Legislative Assembly of Karnataka a south state of India. It was a part of Bangalore North Lok Sabha constituency. It was replaced by Hebbal Assembly constituency in the 2008 delimitation.

== Members of the Legislative Assembly ==
Election	Member	Party
1978	Jeevaraj Alva	Janata Party
1983	Jeevaraj Alva	Janata Party
1985	Jeevaraj Alva	Janata Party
1989	S. M. Yahya	Indian National Congress
1994	R. Krishnappa	Janata Dal
1999	R. Roshan Baig	Indian National Congress
2004	R. Roshan Baig	Indian National Congress

== Election results ==
=== Assembly Election 2004 ===
2004 Karnataka Legislative Assembly election : Jayamahal
Party	Candidate	Votes	%	±%
INC	R. Roshan Baig	41,757	46.92%	▲1.38
BJP	Prof. Dr. Mumtaz Ali Khan	21,877	24.58%	New
JD(S)	R. Krishnappa	19,560	21.98%	▲11.25
Independent	Pradeepkumar Reddy. R	3,437	3.86%	New
BSP	Tulasiprakash. V	880	0.99%	New
Kannada Nadu Party	Kavitha D. Davis	787	0.88%	New
Margin of victory		19,880	22.34%	▲15.92
Turnout		88,991	48.53%	▼6.16
Total valid votes		88,991		
Registered electors		183,381		▲8.75
INC hold		Swing	▲1.38	

=== Assembly Election 1999 ===
1999 Karnataka Legislative Assembly election : Jayamahal
Party	Candidate	Votes	%	±%
INC	R. Roshan Baig	41,990	45.54%	▲11.21
JD(U)	Jeevaraj Alva	36,070	39.12%	New
JD(S)	R. Krishnappa	9,894	10.73%	New
Independent	Syad Jaleel Ahamed	992	1.08%	New
AIADMK	M. K. Balaraman	991	1.07%	New
Independent	A. Sathya	823	0.89%	New
Independent	Mustak Ahamed	646	0.70%	New
Margin of victory		5,920	6.42%	▲2.68
Turnout		92,223	54.69%	▲0.44
Total valid votes		92,203		
Rejected ballots		4	0.00%	▼1.54
Registered electors		168,629		▲18.06
INC gain from JD		Swing	▲7.47	

=== Assembly Election 1994 ===
1994 Karnataka Legislative Assembly election : Jayamahal
Party	Candidate	Votes	%	±%
JD	R. Krishnappa	29,011	38.07%	▲5.22
INC	S. M. Yahya	26,163	34.33%	▼18.27
BJP	Abbas Ali Bohra	12,810	16.81%	▲14.96
JP	V. Sathyanarayana Rao	2,715	3.56%	New
INC	S. R. Khan	2,267	2.97%	New
BSP	A. K. Subbaiah	1,457	1.91%	New
Independent	Joshuva Chella Dorai	538	0.71%	New
Margin of victory		2,848	3.74%	▼16.01
Turnout		77,490	54.25%	▼0.35
Total valid votes		76,212		
Rejected ballots		1,194	1.54%	▼2.13
Registered electors		142,831		▼5.64
JD gain from INC		Swing	▼14.53	

=== Assembly Election 1989 ===
1989 Karnataka Legislative Assembly election : Jayamahal
Party	Candidate	Votes	%	±%
INC	S. M. Yahya	41,884	52.60%	▲11.43
JD	T. Prabhakar	26,159	32.85%	New
JP	M. N. Balliappa	5,883	7.39%	New
BJP	Krishnappa	1,470	1.85%	New
Lok Dal (B)	C. Ramu	1,081	1.36%	New
Independent	V. M. Raju	612	0.77%	New
Independent	Khalid Eqbal	507	0.64%	New
Margin of victory		15,725	19.75%	▲8.96
Turnout		82,655	54.60%	▲1.04
Total valid votes		79,621		
Rejected ballots		3,034	3.67%	▲2.40
Registered electors		151,372		▲30.90
INC gain from JP		Swing	▲0.65	

=== Assembly Election 1985 ===
1985 Karnataka Legislative Assembly election : Jayamahal
Party	Candidate	Votes	%	±%
JP	Jeevaraj Alva	31,768	51.95%	▼8.97
INC	A. K. A. Samad	25,172	41.17%	▲7.98
Independent	I. Chander	1,643	2.69%	New
LKD	A. K. Syed	987	1.61%	New
Independent	Khalid Nishu	424	0.69%	New
Independent	Sanaulla	403	0.66%	New
Margin of victory		6,596	10.79%	▼16.94
Turnout		61,931	53.56%	▼7.29
Total valid votes		61,147		
Rejected ballots		784	1.27%	▼0.89
Registered electors		115,637		▲17.74
JP hold		Swing	▼8.97	

=== Assembly Election 1983 ===
1983 Karnataka Legislative Assembly election : Jayamahal
Party	Candidate	Votes	%	±%
JP	Jeevaraj Alva	35,622	60.92%	▲21.24
INC	S. Hameed Shah	19,407	33.19%	▲30.62
Independent	Pandiyan. M	1,463	2.50%	New
BJP	M. Ramakrishna Prasad	977	1.67%	New
Independent	Rahman Shariff	394	0.67%	New
Margin of victory		16,215	27.73%	▲22.69
Turnout		59,759	60.85%	▼1.15
Total valid votes		58,469		
Rejected ballots		1,290	2.16%	▼0.32
Registered electors		98,212		▲28.65
JP hold		Swing	▲21.24	

=== Assembly Election 1978 ===
1978 Karnataka Legislative Assembly election : Jayamahal
Party	Candidate	Votes	%	±%
JP	Jeevaraj Alva	18,316	39.68%	New
INC(I)	S. Hameed Shah	15,991	34.64%	New
AIADMK	Muniyappa	3,998	8.66%	New
Independent	Muniramaiah. M	3,772	8.17%	New
INC	Abdul Khudus Anvar	1,185	2.57%	New
Independent	Lasani. N. A	1,101	2.39%	New
Independent	Ramalah. C	568	1.23%	New
Independent	Chellaiah	531	1.15%	New
Independent	Manamad Mustak	307	0.67%	New
Margin of victory		2,325	5.04%	
Turnout		47,333	62.00%	
Total valid votes		46,159		
Rejected ballots		1,174	2.48%	
Registered electors		76,341		
JP win (new seat)				

== See also ==
- Bangalore Urban district
- List of constituencies of Karnataka Legislative Assembly
