= C. Motamma =

Indian politician

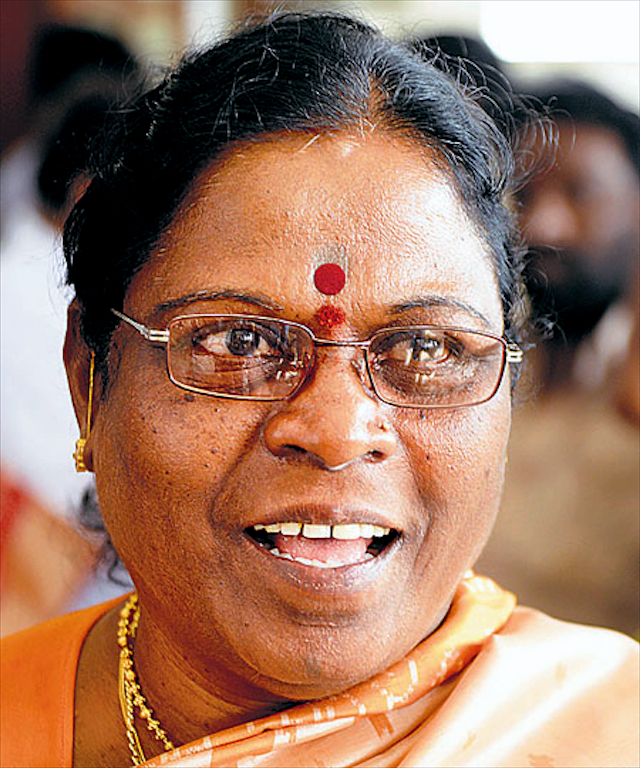

Vice-President of Karnataka Pradesh Congress Committee
- Incumbent
- Assumed office 14 July 2017
- President: G. Parameshwara

Leader of the Opposition in Karnataka Legislative Council
- In office 9 January 2010 – 17 June 2012
- Chief minister: B. S. Yeddyurappa: D. V. Sadananda Gowda
- Preceded by: Ugrappa
- Succeeded by: S. R. Patil

Minister for Women & Welfare of Karnataka
- In office 11 October 1999 – 28 May 2004
- Chief Minister: S. M. Krishna
- Preceded by: Vimalabai Deshmukh
- Succeeded by: Bhagirathi M. Gouda

Personal details
- Born: 20 March 1951 (age 75) Acharadi, Hanbal, Sakleshpur, Hassan, Mysore State (now in Karnataka)
- Party: Indian National Congress (1978–present)
- Spouse: Venkataraman S.
- Children: 3, including Nayana
- Education: Bangalore University
- Profession: Politician; agriculturist

C. Motamma (born 20 March 1951) is an Indian politician from the state of Karnataka. She served as Leader of the Opposition in the Karnataka Legislative Council between 2010 and 2012. She is the first woman to hold that position. She also served as Minister for Women & Child Welfare in the government of Karnataka as part of the Krishna ministry.

== Early life and education ==
Motamma was born as fourth child and third daughter, She has one elder brother and two elder sisters, She wasn't named her name until she joined Primary School near Maggalamakki, Mudigere, which was started newly, her nickname Motu became her name as Motamma. She did her high school in Chikmagalur. PUC, B.A. in Maharani College Bangalore, and M.A. in the Bangalore University and it was first Co-Ed College.

== Political career ==
Motamma represented Mudigere in 1978, 1989 and 1999. She was Member of Legislative Council from 2006 to 2012. She again got elected to Member of Legislative Council on 18 June 2012.

== Personal life ==
Motamma is married to Venkataraman. They have a daughter and two sons. Her daughter Nayana, who is a legislator from Mudigere.
