= B. B. Ningaiah =

Indian politician

B. B. Ningaiah (born 1959) is an Indian politician from the state of Karnataka. He was a minister in the Government of Karnataka and a two term member of the Karnataka Legislative Assembly from Mudigere Assembly constituency.

He is from Mudigere, Chikmagalur district, Karnataka. He is the son of Bommaiah. He completed his MA in economics in 1982 at Mangalore University and later did LLB in 2003 at Bangalore University.

He won from Mudigere Assembly constituency in Chikmagalur district in the 2013 Karnataka Legislative Assembly election representing Janata Dal (Secular) defeating B. N. Chandrappa of the Indian National Congress by a margin of 635 votes. He first became an MLA winning the 1985 Karnataka Legislative Assembly election on Janata Party ticket. But he lost the 2018 Assembly election to MP Kumaraswamy of the BJP.
