= Mysore Assembly constituency =

Mysore Assembly constituency or Mysore City Assembly constituency may refer to many constituencies in Mysore City of Mysore State or Karnataka:

- Mysore City South Assembly constituency, a defunct constituency
- Mysore City North Assembly constituency, a defunct constituency
- Mysore Taluk Assembly constituency, a defunct constituency
- Krishnaraja Assembly constituency
- Chamaraja Assembly constituency
- Narasimharaja Assembly constituency
- Chamundeshwari Assembly constituency
- Varuna Assembly constituency
