= Sampagaon Assembly constituency =

Sampagaon Assembly constituency may refer to many constituencies in Sampagaon, Belgaum in the Indian state of Karnataka:

- Bailhongal Assembly constituency
- Kittur Assembly constituency
- Sampagaon I Assembly constituency, a defunct constituency
- Sampagaon II Assembly constituency, a defunct constituency
