= 1962 Mysore State Legislative Assembly election =

1962 Mysore Legislative Assembly election
- 1962

All 208 seats in the Mysore Legislative Assembly 105 seats needed for a majority
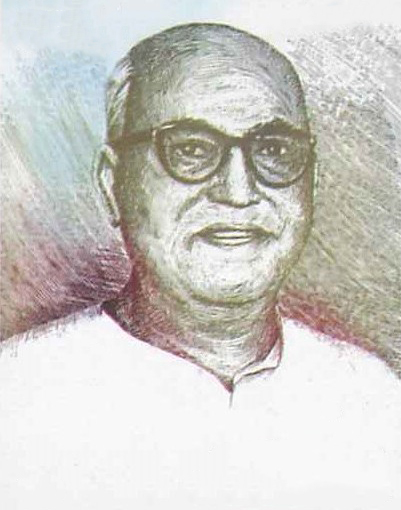
	First party	Second party
		PSP
Party	INC	PSP
Last election	150	18
Seats won	138	20
Popular vote	3,164,811	887,363
Percentage	50.22%	14.02%
Swing	▼1.86%	▲0.02%
CM before election
B. D. Jatti
INC
Elected CM
S. R. Kanthi
INC

The 1962 Mysore State Legislative Assembly election was held in the Indian state of Mysore (currently Karnataka) to elect 208 members to the Mysore Legislative Assembly.

== Results ==
Summary of results of the Mysore Legislative Assembly election, 1962
Political party	Contestants	Seats won	Seat change	Votes	Vote share	Net change
Indian National Congress	208	138	▼12	3,164,811	50.22%	▼1.80
Praja Socialist Party	84	20	▲2	887,363	14.08%	▲0.02
Swatantra Party	59	9		450,713	7.15%	
Maharashtra Ekikaran Samiti	6	6		136878	2.17%	
Lok Sewak Sangh	17	4		159,545	2.53%	
Communist Party of India	31	3		143835	2.28%	
Socialist Party	9	1		62809	1.00%	
Independent		27	▼9	1,091,011	17.31%	N/A
Total		208				

=== Results by constituency ===
District	Constituency		Turnout	Winner				Runner-up				Margin
District	No.	Name	%	Candidate	Party	Votes	%	Candidate	Party	Votes	%	Margin
Bidar	1	Santpur	34.96	Prabhoo Rao	INC	9,098	47.82	Vithal Rao Kamble	RPI	7,893	41.49	1,205
Bidar	2	Bhalki	54.90	Bhimanna Shivlingappa	PSP	12,114	48.34	Yeshwant Rao Keshav Rao	Ind	6,577	26.25	5,537
Bidar	3	Bidar	42.15	Maqsood Ali Khan	INC	14,277	67.85	R. V. Bidap	PSP	6,161	29.28	8,116
Bidar	4	Hulsoor	61.67	Bapu Rao	Ind	13,424	43.09	Subhadra Bai	INC	13,386	42.97	38
Bidar	5	Kalyani	48.26	Annapurna Bai	INC	12,868	52.11	Krishnaji Shastry	Ind	6,481	26.25	6,387
Bidar	6	Humnabad	50.44	Gopal Rao Mudbi	INC	11,476	50.61	Vishwanath	CPI	11,201	49.39	275
Gulbarga	7	Chincholi	46.42	Veerendra Patil	INC	13,391	56.40	Sharangowda Sidramayya	SWA	10,353	43.60	3,038
Gulbarga	8	Kamalapur	44.58	L. Chandrashekhar	INC	14,484	69.60	Hanmanth Rao	PSP	3,949	18.98	10,535
Gulbarga	9	Aland	38.93	Devappa Shamanna	INC	11,631	65.11	B. Shamsunder	PSP	4,141	23.18	7,490
Gulbarga	10	Gulbarga	52.28	Gangadhar Namoshi	CPI	14,208	53.72	Mohammed Mehtab Ali	INC	10,920	41.29	3,288
Gulbarga	11	Afzalpur	35.27	Anna Rao Ganamukhi	INC	14,078	86.52	Sharnappa Rukkappa	RPI	1,411	8.67	12,667
Gulbarga	12	Kalgi	37.99	S. Rudrappa	INC	10,608	60.49	Sharangowda Siddaramayya	SWA	3,779	21.55	6,829
Gulbarga	13	Chittapur	43.26	Vijaya Devi	INC	11,296	53.01	Shantmallappa Bhankur	SWA	6,167	28.94	5,129
Gulbarga	14	Sedam	39.46	Papiah Jamadanda	INC	10,012	58.92	Devendra Kumar	SWA	6,981	41.08	3,031
Gulbarga	15	Gurmitkal	50.99	Vidyadhar Guruji Sayanna	SWA	19,378	67.18	Mallappa Kollur	INC	9,469	32.82	9,909
Gulbarga	16	Jevargi	49.45	Nilkanthappa Sharnappa	INC	12,251	51.38	Channabasappa Dandappa	SWA	11,595	48.62	656
Gulbarga	17	Yadgir	53.53	Bhoj Raj	LSS	15,872	53.51	Konappa Nadagouda	INC	13,788	46.49	2,084
Gulbarga	18	Shahapur	37.79	Mahantswami Verupakshaya	SWA	11,915	59.55	Virupakshappa	INC	8,094	40.45	3,821
Gulbarga	19	Shorapur	52.44	Raja Pidnaik	SWA	18,841	70.64	Dharmrao Sharnappa	INC	7,830	29.36	11,011
Bijapur	20	Badami	62.30	Venkanagouda Patil	INC	17,573	58.93	Shankarappa Pattanshetti	SWA	11,585	38.85	5,988
Bijapur	21	Guledgud	59.29	Madivalappa Pattanshetti	INC	18,160	61.24	Shrinivas Kasta	BJS	11,496	38.76	6,664
Bijapur	22	Hungund	62.12	S. R. Kanthi	INC	20,010	66.71	Gaigayya Nanjayanmath	Ind	8,427	28.09	11,583
Bijapur	23	Bagalkot	54.18	Basappa Muranal	INC	23,212	78.28	Ganapat Kamble	BJS	6,439	21.72	16,773
Bijapur	24	Mudhol	68.31	Ningappa Naik	INC	19,575	52.78	Krishnappa Nadgouda	SWA	17,105	46.12	2,470
Bijapur	25	Bilgi	59.51	Rachappa Desai	INC	23,158	74.32	Gurupadayya Advimath	SWA	4,359	13.99	18,799
Bijapur	26	Jamkhandi	68.55	B. D. Jatti	INC	22,776	63.71	Mahadevappa Murgod	LSS	11,844	33.13	10,932
Bijapur	27	Tikota	51.51	M. B. Patil	INC	19,957	83.22	Bhimangouda Biradar	SWA	4,024	16.78	15,933
Bijapur	28	Bijapur	60.49	Revansiddapa Navadagi	INC	13,828	49.71	Nabisab Balasing	Ind	4,846	17.42	8,982
Bijapur	29	Basavana Bagevadi	52.35	Sushilabai Shah	INC	11,941	51.57	Ramangouda Patil	Ind	6,113	26.40	5,828
Bijapur	30	Muddebihal	54.92	Sivashankarappa Guraddi	INC	13,969	56.67	Shrishailappa Masali	SWA	10,680	43.33	3,289
Bijapur	31	Talikot	—	Gadigeppagouda Patil	INC	Unopposed		—				
Bijapur	32	Indi	60.11	Gurulingappa Patil	SWA	14,624	51.11	Mallappa Surpur	INC	13,673	47.79	951
Bijapur	33	Baradol	33.13	Jatteppa Kabadi	INC	9,792	65.61	Shivappa Kamble	RPI	2,623	17.57	7,169
Bijapur	34	Sindagi	52.11	Channappa Desai	INC	14,012	57.42	Shidappa Raddewadgi	SWA	7,432	30.46	6,580
Belagavi	35	Athani	62.97	Dhairyashil Pawar	INC	20,119	66.96	Narasagauda Patil	Ind	9,307	30.98	10,812
Belagavi	36	Kagwad	61.35	Shankaragaud Patil	INC	19,302	66.33	Jinadatta Desai	SWA	7,371	25.33	11,931
Belagavi	37	Raibag	60.50	Balu Soudagar	INC	26,049	89.29	Vasant Pattan	RPI	3,125	10.71	22,924
Belagavi	38	Chikkodi	66.35	Mallappa Shetti	Ind	17,994	57.52	Shankarrao Kothaval	INC	13,287	42.48	4,707
Belagavi	39	Sadalga	74.70	Shidagouda Patil	INC	23,092	62.31	Krishna Telavekar	Ind	10,195	27.51	12,897
Belagavi	40	Nippani	73.04	Govind Manavi	MES	27,280	74.63	Balkrishna Patwardhan	INC	9,274	25.37	18,006
Belagavi	41	Sankeshwar	56.51	Champabai Bhogale	INC	14,273	60.09	B. Shankaranand	RPI	9,478	39.91	4,795
Belagavi	42	Hukkeri	54.01	Satigouda Patil	INC	16,161	69.36	Virupaxappa Heddurshetti	PSP	7,139	30.64	9,022
Belagavi	43	Belagavi City	74.39	Balakrishna Sunthankar	MES	27,643	67.00	Sidaram Kanabargi	INC	13,614	33.00	14,029
Belagavi	44	Belgaum I	64.75	Vithal S. Patil	MES	17,778	57.18	Vithal K. Patil	INC	13,312	42.82	4,466
Belagavi	45	Belgaum II	71.77	Nagendra Samaji	MES	18,505	51.26	Chandrappa Pattanshetti	INC	17,592	48.74	913
Belagavi	46	Gokak I	56.69	Ningappa Karlingannavar	INC	19,245	69.70	Shivangouda Patil	Ind	8,366	30.30	10,879
Belagavi	47	Gokak II	48.33	Appanna Panchagavi	INC	18,420	82.39	Kamappa Hosamani	Ind	2,754	12.32	15,666
Belagavi	48	Ramdurg	72.29	Ramanagouda Patil	INC	19,287	51.94	Mahadevappa Pattan	LSS	17,849	48.06	1,438
Belagavi	49	Parasgad	67.06	Venkaraddi Timmaraddi	INC	17,811	53.89	Shankarrao Padaki	Ind	15,242	46.11	2,569
Belagavi	50	Sampagaon I	60.79	Chanappa Kallur	INC	19,370	66.71	Basavaraj Naik	PSP	9,665	33.29	9,705
Belagavi	51	Sampagaon II	78.68	Mugatsab Nagnur	INC	21,856	57.79	Parwatgouda Patil	Ind	14,592	38.58	7,264
Belagavi	52	Khanapur	69.23	Laxman Birje	MES	25,162	63.26	Rohinibai Wagale	INC	14,614	36.74	10,548
Uttara Kannada	53	Karwar	57.93	Balsu Kadam	MES	20,510	61.66	Anant Bale	INC	12,752	38.34	7,758
Uttara Kannada	54	Ankola	51.93	Shakar Phayde	INC	19,235	61.68	Narashimha Hebbar	PSP	8,502	27.26	10,733
Uttara Kannada	55	Kumta	53.62	Vasantlata Mirjankar	INC	14,225	50.48	Narayan Pai	PSP	11,197	39.73	3,028
Uttara Kannada	56	Honawar	58.30	Shamsuddin Jukaku	INC	18,506	58.47	Honna Naik	PSP	10,986	34.71	7,520
Uttara Kannada	57	Sirsi	71.28	Ramakrishna Hegde	INC	19,817	53.33	H. Ganapatiyappa	PSP	9,421	25.35	10,396
Dharwad	58	Hirekerur	69.79	Shankarrao Gubbi	INC	23,284	64.27	Shiddanagouda Karegoudar	SWA	12,946	35.73	10,338
Dharwad	59	Ranibennur	65.40	Yallawa Sambrani	INC	18,715	58.56	Yallappa Jogannowar	PSP	12,596	39.41	6,119
Dharwad	60	Byadgi	69.14	Shiddamma Mailar	INC	21,092	60.18	Mahadeva Banakar	PSP	13,958	39.82	7,134
Dharwad	61	Hangal	76.53	Gururao Desai	INC	19,843	51.23	Basanagouda Patil	PSP	18,890	48.77	953
Dharwad	62	Shiggaon	54.19	Fakkirappa Taware	INC	20,838	75.93	Fakkiragouda Patil	PSP	6,606	24.07	14,232
Dharwad	63	Haveri	68.51	Basavaraj Magavi	INC	18,945	57.78	Shivaraj Nelavigi	SWA	9,790	29.86	9,155
Dharwad	64	Shirahatti	70.86	Shiddaiah Kashimath	SWA	17,347	50.75	Leelavati Magadi	INC	16,832	49.25	515
Dharwad	65	Kundgol	62.67	Timmanna Kamble	INC	13,265	44.15	Somanna Bommai	Ind	11,465	38.16	1,800
Dharwad	66	Hubli City	65.84	Rajesab Koppal	INC	21,169	57.28	Sadashiva Shettar	BJS	11,900	32.20	9,269
Dharwad	67	Hubli	59.53	P. M. Ramangouda	INC	23,356	74.82	Shivalingayya Tadasadmath	Ind	4,489	14.38	18,867
Dharwad	68	Kalghatgi	59.23	Fakirappa Hasbi	INC	13,842	45.95	Basavraj Desai	LSS	12,047	39.99	1,795
Dharwad	69	Dharwad	55.16	Hasansab Dasankop	INC	17,092	68.65	Yellappagouda Patil	BJS	5,185	20.83	11,907
Dharwad	70	Navalgund	69.61	Ramanagouda Patil	INC	20,618	58.23	Mallappa Kulkarni	Ind	13,183	37.23	7,435
Dharwad	71	Nargund	60.67	Adiveppagouda Patil	INC	24,601	73.40	Shiddangouda Patil	Ind	7,951	23.72	16,650
Dharwad	72	Gadag	78.34	Kuberappa Gadag	INC	18,539	49.19	Kristagouda Patil	Ind	17,234	45.72	1,305
Dharwad	73	Mundargi	54.65	Chanabasappa Hulkoti	INC	18,303	66.46	Tamminagouda Patil	Ind	7,574	27.50	10,729
Dharwad	74	Ron	64.80	Andanappa Doddameti	INC	18,640	63.92	Sivamurtayya Math	Ind	8,543	29.30	10,097
Raichur	75	Raichur	34.45	M. Mohiuddin Ghouse	INC	9,699	53.84	Narayanappa Gandhal	LSS	8,317	46.16	1,382
Raichur	76	Kalmala	22.86	Nagamma	INC	7,396	68.35	B. Bheemayya	LSS	3,035	28.05	4,361
Raichur	77	Devadurga	43.49	Sharanappa	INC	16,143	71.03	C. M. Devindra Naik	LSS	6,583	28.97	9,560
Raichur	78	Manvi	42.66	Baswarajeshwari	INC	15,139	69.09	Ramachandra Rao	SWA	3,856	17.60	11,283
Raichur	79	Lingsugur	53.05	Linganna	LSS	13,289	56.35	Raja Naik	INC	7,551	32.02	5,738
Raichur	80	Sindhanur	51.16	Baswantrao Bassanagouda	INC	15,073	51.47	Amaregouda	LSS	14,212	48.53	861
Raichur	81	Kushtagi	55.51	Kata Rao	LSS	15,233	51.77	Pundalikappa	INC	14,194	48.23	1,039
Raichur	82	Yelburga	51.70	Veerabhadrappa Irappa	LSS	16,104	52.95	Shankargouda Basangouda	INC	14,310	47.05	1,794
Raichur	83	Koppal	52.18	Malikarjungouda Sanganagouda	INC	10,701	50.82	Patreppa Madnur	LSS	10,355	49.18	346
Raichur	84	Gangawati	41.41	Tirumaladeva Rangadevarayalu	INC	15,823	72.42	Shanamukhappa Bhimappa	LSS	6,027	27.58	9,796
Bellary	85	Hadagali	64.50	Channabasappa Angadi	PSP	22,694	57.95	Bhavi Lingappa	INC	16,469	42.05	6,225
Bellary	86	Hospet	72.54	Murari Sreeramulu	PSP	21,913	64.95	R. Nagana Gowda	INC	11,153	33.06	10,760
Bellary	87	Siruguppa	67.79	C. M. Revana Siddaiah	SWA	22,517	62.00	H. Linga Reddy	INC	12,940	35.63	9,577
Bellary	88	Kurugodu	64.51	Allum Karibasappa	INC	18,995	62.13	Hampa Reddy	Ind	11,580	37.87	7,415
Bellary	89	Bellary	52.90	T. G. Sathyanarayan	INC	17,250	51.68	R. A. Subhan	SWA	15,560	46.62	1,690
Bellary	90	Sandur	50.49	M. Y. Ghorpade	INC	23,893	81.40	Hanumantappa	SWA	4,118	14.03	19,775
Bellary	91	Harapanahalli	79.99	Sirasappa Ijari	INC	28,440	56.81	Sanganna Mudenur	PSP	21,620	43.19	6,820
Bellary	92	Kudligi	58.84	V. Nagappa	Ind	15,687	54.22	Basavva	INC	8,704	30.08	6,983
Chitradurga	93	Molakalmuru	71.05	S. H. Basanna	INC	20,845	54.04	G. Veeranna	PSP	15,041	38.99	5,804
Chitradurga	94	Challakere	65.16	B. L. Gowda	PSP	17,067	43.14	Ratnagiri Venkatarangan	INC	14,075	35.57	2,992
Chitradurga	95	Jagalur	54.35	M. N. Krishna Singh	INC	12,390	44.23	K. V. Venkatappa	PSP	7,938	28.34	4,452
Chitradurga	96	Davanagere	65.89	Kondajji Basappa	INC	23,739	55.28	C. Keshava Murthy	PSP	17,977	41.86	5,762
Chitradurga	97	Harihar	73.18	Ganji Veerappa	INC	22,528	51.26	Y. Neelappa	PSP	20,127	45.80	2,401
Chitradurga	98	Chitradurga	62.15	H. C. Boraiah	INC	19,897	56.67	M. Gangadharaiah	PSP	15,215	43.33	4,682
Chitradurga	99	Holalkere	55.12	G. Duggappa	INC	16,752	61.41	B. Rangappa	Ind	8,926	32.72	7,826
Chitradurga	100	Hiriyur	73.28	V. Masiyappa	INC	29,018	56.83	P. T. Eswarappa	PSP	11,655	22.82	17,363
Chitradurga	101	Hosadurga	73.64	G. T. Rangappa	PSP	22,024	57.45	S. Nijalingappa	INC	16,315	42.55	5,709
Shimoga	102	Channagiri	65.75	Kundur Rudrappa	INC	21,368	58.37	J. H. Patel	SP	14,041	38.36	7,327
Shimoga	103	Bhadravati	57.01	T. D. Devendrappa	INC	19,604	51.57	B. Krishna Bhatt	PSP	15,256	40.13	4,348
Shimoga	104	Shimoga	54.10	Ratnamma Madhava Rao	INC	14,087	44.44	G. M. Channappa	PSP	9,011	28.43	5,076
Shimoga	105	Honnali	71.82	D. Parameswarappa	PSP	20,192	54.80	H. S. Rudrappa	INC	14,475	39.28	5,717
Shimoga	106	Shikaripura	51.48	Veerappa	INC	17,313	54.90	G. Basavanappa	PSP	12,385	39.28	4,928
Shimoga	107	Sagar	55.18	V. S. Laxmikanthappa	INC	20,854	51.83	Kagodu Thimmappa	SP	17,555	43.63	3,299
Shimoga	108	Tirthahalli	62.25	Shantaveri Gopala Gowda	SP	18,649	56.25	K. T. Danamma	INC	6,085	18.35	12,564
South Kanara	109	Sullia	53.24	K. Subbayya Naika	INC	12,787	49.38	Venkappa Naika	SWA	9,991	38.58	2,796
South Kanara	110	Puttur	55.52	K. Venkatramana Gowda	INC	14,259	48.45	K. Uggappa Shetty	SWA	8,163	27.74	6,096
South Kanara	111	Belthangady	60.31	Bantwal Vaikunta Baliga	INC	15,991	46.18	K. B. Jinaraja Hegde	SWA	12,486	36.06	3,505
South Kanara	112	Panemangalore	61.55	K. Nagappa Alva	INC	16,170	47.69	M. H. Krishnappa	CPI	10,805	31.87	5,365
South Kanara	113	Mangalore I	80.20	M. Shrinivasa Nayak	INC	16,785	41.37	A. Shantharam Pai	CPI	11,059	27.26	5,726
South Kanara	114	Mangalore II	75.61	A. Krishna Shetty	CPI	17,725	42.37	B. M. Idinabba	INC	16,912	40.42	813
South Kanara	115	Surathkal	53.30	Sanjeevanath Aikal	PSP	13,148	48.90	K. Doomappa	INC	9,981	37.12	3,167
South Kanara	116	Kaup	58.18	B. Bhaskar Shetty	PSP	13,624	48.77	F. X. D. Pinto	INC	13,441	48.12	183
South Kanara	117	Udupi	72.56	M. Madhvaraja	INC	17,511	53.58	Upendra Nayak	PSP	8,003	24.49	9,508
South Kanara	118	Brahmavar	57.51	S. D. Samrajya	INC	14,601	53.47	Sheenappa Shetty	PSP	6,915	25.32	7,686
South Kanara	119	Kundapura	59.26	S. S. Kolkebail	INC	16,975	52.57	V. Srinivasa Shetty	PSP	14,858	46.01	2,117
South Kanara	120	Byndoor	50.44	Y. Manjayya Shetty	INC	16,591	49.01	H. Subba Rao	PSP	14,752	43.58	1,839
South Kanara	121	Karkala	64.63	Dayanand R. Kalle	PSP	17,234	59.05	K. K. Hegde	INC	11,372	38.97	5,862
South Kanara	122	Moodabidri	44.54	Gopal Salenna	SWA	10,431	50.63	Manjappa Ullal	INC	10,173	49.37	258
Chikmagalur	123	Sringeri	62.39	Kadidal Manjappa	INC	24,824	70.49	N. P. Govinda Gowda	Ind	9,587	27.22	15,237
Chikmagalur	124	Tarikere	64.99	T. R. Parameshwaraiah	INC	18,357	47.13	Hanji Shivanna	PSP	17,990	46.19	367
Chikmagalur	125	Kadur	58.96	G. Marulappa	Ind	21,736	67.79	D. H. Rudrappa	INC	10,329	32.21	11,407
Chikmagalur	126	Chikmagalur	44.66	B. L. Subbamma	INC	9,717	44.67	C. M. S. Sasthri	PSP	6,378	29.32	3,339
Chikmagalur	127	Mudigere	43.27	K. H. Ranganath	PSP	10,423	47.19	L. H. Thimmabhovi	INC	10,373	46.97	50
Hassan	128	Arsikere	57.36	P. B. Bommanna	PSP	14,639	52.20	A. R. Karisiddappa	INC	11,655	41.56	2,984
Hassan	129	Belur	34.85	B. H. Lakshmanaiah	INC	10,801	60.69	Ranga Boyi	BJS	2,734	15.36	8,067
Hassan	130	Sakleshpur	55.71	S. A. Vasanna Setty	INC	18,623	63.30	N. B. Shetty	BJS	8,437	28.68	10,186
Hassan	131	Arkalgud	68.08	G. A. Thimmappa Gowda	INC	18,967	57.50	H. N. Nanje Gowda	PSP	11,870	35.99	7,097
Hassan	132	Hassan	57.22	Yashodharamma	INC	11,498	41.47	H. B. Jwalaniah	Ind	9,265	33.42	2,233
Hassan	133	Gandasi	42.93	H. R. Keshava Murthy	PSP	8,637	36.02	Chikkegowda	SWA	8,267	34.48	370
Hassan	134	Shravanabelagola	70.29	S. Shivappa	PSP	21,136	62.87	K. Lakkappa	INC	12,483	37.13	8,653
Hassan	135	Holenarasipur	63.55	H. D. Deve Gowda	Ind	12,622	42.49	H. D. Doddegowda	INC	7,338	24.70	5,284
Tumkur	136	Turuvekere	72.78	B. Hutche Gowda	PSP	18,695	54.49	T. Subramanya	INC	15,615	45.51	3,080
Tumkur	137	Tiptur	58.44	K. P. Revanasiddappa	PSP	17,754	56.83	M. S. Neelakantaswamy	INC	13,484	43.17	4,270
Tumkur	138	Chikkanayakanahalli	60.14	C. H. Lingadevaru	INC	16,473	53.49	C. S. Ananthaiah	PSP	9,371	30.43	7,102
Tumkur	139	Sira	64.73	C. J. Muckkannappa	Ind	21,746	53.25	Mali Mariappa	INC	18,002	44.08	3,744
Tumkur	140	Pavagada	43.68	R. Kenchappa	INC	12,976	55.32	N. B. Hanumantha Rayappa	PSP	7,478	31.88	5,498
Tumkur	141	Gubbi	57.73	V. M. Deo	Ind	10,420	35.22	R. S. Aradhya	INC	9,896	33.45	524
Tumkur	142	Chandrashekarapura	71.80	N. Huchamasthy Gowda	INC	14,012	37.28	G. Thammanna	Ind	13,138	34.95	874
Tumkur	143	Kunigal	67.94	Andanaiah	Ind	17,410	51.90	T. N. Mudalagiri Gowda	INC	9,165	27.32	8,245
Tumkur	144	Hebbur	72.15	K. Lakkappa	PSP	21,822	54.61	K. L. Narasimhaiah	INC	18,140	45.39	3,682
Tumkur	145	Tumkur	59.25	G. C. Bhageerathamma	INC	15,178	48.63	T. S. Mallikarjunaiah	Ind	10,919	34.99	4,259
Tumkur	146	Koratagere	39.35	R. Channigaramaiah	INC	9,053	46.69	S. Anjaiah	PSP	8,885	45.82	168
Tumkur	147	Madhugiri	65.07	T. S. Shivanna	PSP	19,083	51.63	G. T. Govinda Reddy	INC	15,492	41.92	3,591
Kolar	148	Gauribidanur	72.25	R. N. Lakshmipathi	Ind	24,391	59.33	K. H. Venkata Reddy	INC	16,718	40.67	7,673
Kolar	149	Chikballapur	64.35	C. V. Venkatarayappa	Ind	23,362	63.60	T. S. Venkataramanaiah	INC	13,373	36.40	9,989
Kolar	150	Bagepalli	46.08	B. Subbarayappa	INC	12,949	50.77	K. M. Muniyappa	Ind	12,556	49.23	393
Kolar	151	Sidlaghatta	70.27	S. Avala Reddy	INC	21,696	57.57	J. Venkatappa	Ind	15,989	42.43	5,707
Kolar	152	Chintamani	69.86	M. C. Anjaneya Reddy	Ind	21,664	56.13	V. Seethappa	INC	16,931	43.87	4,733
Kolar	153	Srinivasapur	61.94	G. Narayana Gowda	INC	20,311	57.39	B. L. Narayanaswamy	Ind	15,082	42.61	5,229
Kolar	154	Mulbagal	35.45	J. Narayanappa	INC	12,070	64.69	P. Muniyappa	Ind	4,021	21.55	8,049
Kolar	155	Kolar	62.37	P. Venkatagiriappa	Ind	20,898	57.78	D. Abdul Rasheed	INC	15,272	42.22	5,626
Kolar	156	Robertsonpet	60.81	D. Venkata Ramiah	INC	14,536	69.73	V. M. Govindan	CPI	2,935	14.08	11,601
Kolar	157	Kolar Gold Field	76.23	S. Rajagopal	CPI	6,886	26.71	C. M. Armugam	RPI	6,758	26.21	128
Kolar	158	Bangarapet	54.74	E. Narayana Gowda	Ind	19,626	64.40	K. V. Narayana Reddy	INC	9,513	31.22	10,113
Kolar	159	Malur	67.65	S. V. Rame Gowda	Ind	17,135	51.15	H. C. Linga Reddy	INC	15,723	46.94	1,412
Bangalore	160	Malleshwaram	55.23	K. Devaya	Ind	8,097	22.41	K. Sriramulu	INC	7,832	21.67	265
Bangalore	161	Gandhi Nagar	51.76	Nagarathnamma Hiremath	INC	12,958	48.67	H. L. Nanjappa	Ind	7,041	26.45	5,917
Bangalore	162	Chickpet	58.34	Y. Ramachandra	INC	10,777	44.49	K. M. Naganna	Ind	6,430	26.54	4,347
Bangalore	163	Chamrajpet	46.92	R. Dayananda Sagar	INC	11,897	53.25	M. Rangaiah Naidu	SWA	7,882	35.28	4,015
Bangalore	164	Basavanagudi	53.58	M. Krishnappa	INC	12,676	48.45	V. T. Sreenivasan	SWA	6,053	23.14	6,623
Bangalore	165	Cubbonpet	67.95	B. Nanjappa	Ind	18,750	66.03	V. P. Deenadayalu Naidu	INC	6,874	24.21	11,876
Bangalore	166	Halasuru	59.78	Grace Tucker	INC	6,753	27.10	D. Bashkaran	Ind	6,177	24.79	576
Bangalore	167	Broadway	56.74	H. R. Abdul Gaffar	INC	6,243	27.86	H. Syed Ahamed	Ind	4,718	21.06	1,525
Bangalore	168	Yeshvanthapura	58.61	K. V. Byre Gowda	INC	14,215	44.59	B. Narayanaswamappa	Ind	13,570	42.57	645
Bangalore	169	Yelahanka	60.74	Y. Ramakrishna	INC	17,217	62.79	C. Balasundaram	RPI	5,403	19.71	11,814
Bangalore	170	Hosakote	69.54	B. Chanabyre Gowda	SWA	20,643	56.32	N. Chikke Gowda	INC	16,012	43.68	4,631
Bangalore	171	Devanahalli	37.80	R. Muniswamiah	INC	12,103	62.98	H. V. Nanjaiah	SWA	7,115	37.02	4,988
Bangalore	172	Doddaballapur	73.28	G. Rame Gowda	Ind	25,288	63.36	A. Neelakantaiah	INC	9,450	23.68	15,838
Bangalore	173	Solur	66.62	Alur Hanumanthappa	INC	12,858	44.06	K. V. Nanjappa	PSP	8,346	28.60	4,512
Bangalore	174	Nelamangala	49.15	K. Prabhakar	INC	10,352	53.48	M. Hanumanthaiah	Ind	6,591	34.05	3,761
Bangalore	175	Magadi	61.55	C. R. Range Gowda	PSP	20,441	69.20	T. D. Maranna	INC	9,100	30.80	11,341
Bangalore	176	Ramanagara	56.85	T. Madiah Gowda	INC	15,517	54.06	C. Ramaiah	Ind	9,870	34.39	5,647
Bangalore	177	Channapatna	79.60	B. J. Linge Gowda	INC	22,256	58.17	B. K. Puttaramaiah	PSP	16,003	41.83	6,253
Bangalore	178	Virupakshipura	76.33	K. L. Shivalinge Gowda	INC	19,666	55.36	B. Sidde Gowda	Ind	15,860	44.64	3,806
Bangalore	179	Kanakapura	77.22	S. Kariyappa	Ind	21,085	51.96	K. G. Thimme Gowda	INC	19,492	48.04	1,593
Bangalore	180	Uttarahalli	61.53	J. Srinivasa Reddy	Ind	17,139	53.53	A. V. Narasimha Reddy	INC	14,881	46.47	2,258
Bangalore	181	Bangalore South	62.28	D. Munichinnappa	Ind	17,441	52.79	B. Basavalingappa	INC	11,540	34.93	5,901
Bangalore	182	Anekal	72.67	R. K. Prasad	INC	18,755	51.65	B. N. Venkataramana Reddy	Ind	17,559	48.35	1,196
Mandya	183	Krishnarajpete	65.22	N. Nanje Gowda	Ind	18,236	53.20	M. K. Bomme Gowda	INC	16,040	46.80	2,196
Mandya	184	Pandavapura	60.86	B. Y. Neelegowda	INC	14,089	45.32	N. A. Channegowda	Ind	11,084	35.65	3,005
Mandya	185	Shrirangapattana	58.46	A. G. Bandigowda	INC	23,809	70.81	A. G. Chunche Gowda	Ind	9,389	27.92	14,420
Mandya	186	Mandya	74.98	J. Devaiah	Ind	23,299	47.32	K. V. Shankara Gowda	INC	22,639	45.97	660
Mandya	187	Malavalli	73.46	G. Made Gowda	INC	21,167	64.10	M. C. Doddaiah	PSP	11,149	33.76	10,018
Mandya	188	Kirugavalu	56.23	M. Mallikarjunaswamy	INC	15,039	60.30	M. Chikkalingaiah	PSP	9,901	39.70	5,138
Mandya	189	Maddur	80.83	S. M. Krishna	Ind	24,269	50.07	H. K. Veeranna Gowda	INC	22,313	46.04	1,956
Mandya	190	Nagamangala	70.65	T. N. Madappa Gowda	Ind	19,275	56.15	K. Singarigowda	INC	15,050	43.85	4,225
Mysore	191	Palya	68.58	G. Venkatai Gowda	Ind	19,132	50.09	H. Nagappa	INC	19,065	49.91	67
Mysore	192	Bannur	57.84	S. Siddiah	PSP	13,849	51.07	T. P. Boraiah	INC	13,268	48.93	581
Mysore	193	Kollegal	45.43	B. Basavaiah	INC	12,721	60.04	M. Puttaswamy	PSP	4,729	22.32	7,992
Mysore	194	T. Narasipur	67.29	M. Rajasekara Murthy	INC	15,469	47.54	J. B. Mallaradhya	PSP	12,300	37.80	3,169
Mysore	195	Mysore City	53.46	K. S. Suryanarayana Rao	INC	7,571	31.52	Srikantasharma	SP	4,007	16.68	3,564
Mysore	196	Mysore City North	55.58	B. K. Puttaiah	PSP	8,546	36.59	M. J. Mohamad Yakub	INC	5,018	21.49	3,528
Mysore	197	Mysore	58.73	Kalastavadi Puttaswamy	INC	17,946	56.13	T. V. Srinivasa Rao	PSP	7,191	22.49	10,755
Mysore	198	Nanjangud	61.30	N. Rachaiah	INC	14,855	51.36	L. Srikantaiah	Ind	12,070	41.73	2,785
Mysore	199	Biligere	43.44	D. M. Siddaiah	INC	15,417	81.26	C. Devaiah	Ind	2,053	10.82	13,364
Mysore	200	Santhemarahalli	67.82	B. Rachaiah	INC	16,796	53.32	B. Basaviah	PSP	14,240	45.21	2,556
Mysore	201	Chamarajanagar	69.97	M. C. Basappa	INC	18,783	55.18	U. M. Madappa	PSP	15,255	44.82	3,528
Mysore	202	Gundlupet	76.49	K. S. Nagarathnamma	Ind	22,765	53.22	H. K. Shivarudrappa	INC	20,010	46.78	2,755
Mysore	203	Heggadadevankote	58.69	R. Peeranna	SWA	14,788	47.24	N. Rachaiah	INC	9,942	31.76	4,846
Mysore	204	Hunasuru	—	D. Devaraj Urs	INC	Unopposed		—				
Mysore	205	Krishnarajanagara	70.33	K. S. Gowdaiah	Ind	20,976	53.06	H. M. Channabasappa	INC	18,557	46.94	2,419
Mysore	206	Periyapatna	55.21	K. M. Devayya	INC	16,359	53.99	T. Venkataram	SWA	13,943	46.01	2,416
Coorg	207	Virajpet	59.60	A. P. Appanna	INC	15,292	50.55	Checkera B. Muthanna	Ind	6,973	23.05	8,319
Coorg	208	Madikeri	69.15	K. Mallapa	INC	19,914	49.15	B. D. Appaiah	SWA	9,969	24.60	9,945
