= Baradol Assembly constituency =

Former Assembly constituency in Karnataka, India

Coordinates: 17.278324°N 75.726845°E

Baradol
- Former constituency for the State Legislative Assembly

Constituency details
- Country: India
- State: Mysore State
- Division: Belagavi
- District: Bijapur
- Lok Sabha constituency: Bijapur
- Established: 1962
- Abolished: 1967
- Reservation: SC

Baradol Assembly constituency was one of the seats in Mysore state assembly in India until 1967 when it was made defunct. It was part of Bijapur Lok Sabha constituency.

== Members of the Legislative Assembly ==
Election	Member	Party
1962	Jatteppa Laxman Kabadi	Indian National Congress

== Election results ==
=== Assembly Election 1962 ===
1962 Mysore State Legislative Assembly election : Baradol
Party	Candidate	Votes	%	±%
INC	Jatteppa Laxman Kabadi	9,792	65.61%	New
RPI	Shivappa Dhareppa Kamble	2,623	17.57%	New
SWA	Shivayogi Bhimanna Talakeri	2,113	14.16%	New
Independent	Bislappa Vithoba Harijan	397	2.66%	New
Margin of victory		7,169	48.03%	
Turnout		15,976	33.13%	
Total valid votes		14,925		
Registered electors		48,229		
INC win (new seat)				

== See also ==
- List of constituencies of the Mysore Legislative Assembly
