= Chikkodi Assembly constituency =

Former Assembly constituency in Karnataka, India

Coordinates: 16.428649°N 74.585235°E

Chikkodi
- Former constituency No. 206 for the Karnataka Legislative Assembly

Constituency details
- Country: India
- Region: South India
- State: Karnataka
- Division: Belagavi
- District: Belagavi
- Lok Sabha constituency: Chikkodi
- Established: 1951
- Abolished: 2008
- Reservation: None

Chikkodi Assembly constituency was one of the constituencies in Karnataka state assembly in India until 2008 when it was made defunct. It was part of Chikkodi Lok Sabha constituency.

== Members of the Legislative Assembly ==
Election	Member	Party
1952	Kothavale Shankar Rao Dada Saheb Alias Dadoba	Indian National Congress
1952	Shreyakar Radhabai Maruti	Indian National Congress
1957	Kothavale Shankar Rao Dada Saheb Alias Dadoba	Indian National Congress
1962	Mallappa Virappa Shetti	Independent politician
1967	S. B. Sidray	Indian National Congress
1972	Parashuram Padmanna Hegre	Indian National Congress
1978	Parashuram Padmanna Hegre	Indian National Congress
1983	Parashuram Padmanna Hegre	Janata Party
1985	Chaugule Shakuntala Tukaram	Janata Party
1989	Shrikant Shetteppa Bhimannavar	Indian National Congress
1994	Balasaheb Shamarao Waddar	Janata Dal
1999	Kattimani Manohar Shivaputra	Janata Dal
2004	Hakkyagol Dattu Yellappa	Bharatiya Janata Party

== Election results ==
=== Assembly Election 2004 ===
2004 Karnataka Legislative Assembly election : Chikkodi
Party	Candidate	Votes	%	±%
BJP	Hakkyagol Dattu Yellappa	32,663	34.61%	New
INC	Bhimannavar. S. S	30,121	31.92%	▼6.52
JD(S)	Balasaheb Shamarao Waddar	21,699	22.99%	▲20.76
BSP	Dr. Rajeev Kamble	4,975	5.27%	▲0.88
JP	Ashok Krishna Bhandarkar	2,451	2.60%	New
Independent	Sujata Ramesh Kamble	1,310	1.39%	New
Kannada Nadu Party	Kamble Rau Krishna	1,156	1.22%	New
Margin of victory		2,542	2.69%	▼10.97
Turnout		94,381	64.70%	▲3.92
Total valid votes		94,375		
Registered electors		145,879		▲6.79
BJP gain from JD(U)		Swing	▼17.49	

=== Assembly Election 1999 ===
1999 Karnataka Legislative Assembly election : Chikkodi
Party	Candidate	Votes	%	±%
JD(U)	Kattimani Manohar Shivaputra	41,375	52.10%	New
INC	Rathnamala Savanoor	30,528	38.44%	▲10.82
BSP	Dr. Rajeev Kamble	3,488	4.39%	New
JD(S)	Appasaheb Siddappa Byle	1,773	2.23%	New
Independent	Shamarant Shivappa Rachappa	634	0.80%	New
Independent	Prakash Maruti Waddar	614	0.77%	New
Independent	Shankar Munavalli	507	0.64%	New
BRP	Karale Sanjeev Laxman	501	0.63%	New
Margin of victory		10,847	13.66%	▼19.02
Turnout		83,032	60.78%	▼0.95
Total valid votes		79,420		
Rejected ballots		3,528	4.25%	▲1.35
Registered electors		136,602		▲10.98
JD(U) gain from JD		Swing	▼8.20	

=== Assembly Election 1994 ===
1994 Karnataka Legislative Assembly election : Chikkodi
Party	Candidate	Votes	%	±%
JD	Balasaheb Shamarao Waddar	44,491	60.30%	▲31.16
INC	Omprakash Shankaranand Kanagali	20,378	27.62%	▼5.78
INC	Ashok Kumar. I. Asode	3,360	4.55%	New
Kranti Sabha	Dattu Ratnappa Goundi	3,154	4.27%	▼18.04
BJP	Chougule Ashok Shivappa	1,461	1.98%	New
Margin of victory		24,113	32.68%	▲28.41
Turnout		75,987	61.73%	▼0.44
Total valid votes		73,780		
Rejected ballots		2,207	2.90%	▼5.37
Registered electors		123,091		▲8.19
JD gain from INC		Swing	▲26.90	

=== Assembly Election 1989 ===
1989 Karnataka Legislative Assembly election : Chikkodi
Party	Candidate	Votes	%	±%
INC	Shrikant Shetteppa Bhimannavar	21,670	33.40%	▼11.00
JD	Shrikant Laxman Katti	18,902	29.14%	New
Kranti Sabha	Gundu Manappa Rayamane	14,477	22.31%	New
Independent	Chougule Ashok Shivappa	5,866	9.04%	New
JP	Shankuntala Tukkaram Chaugule	1,637	2.52%	New
Independent	Yadav Manohar Sadashiv	1,055	1.63%	New
Independent	Chikodi Shidram Dundappa	641	0.99%	New
Margin of victory		2,768	4.27%	▼4.89
Turnout		70,729	62.17%	▼4.87
Total valid votes		64,877		
Rejected ballots		5,852	8.27%	▲6.87
Registered electors		113,769		▲24.87
INC gain from JP		Swing	▼20.16	

=== Assembly Election 1985 ===
1985 Karnataka Legislative Assembly election : Chikkodi
Party	Candidate	Votes	%	±%
JP	Chaugule Shakuntala Tukaram	32,257	53.56%	▲7.09
INC	Karale Laxman Bhimrao	26,739	44.40%	▼0.77
Independent	Umrao Ramchandra Gaikwad	546	0.91%	New
Margin of victory		5,518	9.16%	▲7.86
Turnout		61,077	67.04%	▲4.26
Total valid votes		60,222		
Rejected ballots		855	1.40%	▼1.49
Registered electors		91,108		▲14.99
JP hold		Swing	▲7.09	

=== Assembly Election 1983 ===
1983 Karnataka Legislative Assembly election : Chikkodi
Party	Candidate	Votes	%	±%
JP	Parashuram Padmanna Hegre	22,446	46.47%	▲14.11
INC	Chikodi Shidram Dundappa	21,817	45.17%	New
BJP	Maruti Tukaram	2,128	4.41%	New
Independent	Shrikant Shetteppa Bhimannavar	783	1.62%	New
Independent	Balapgol Ningappa Santappa	604	1.25%	New
Independent	Vibhute Shripati Maruti	355	0.73%	New
Margin of victory		629	1.30%	▼21.52
Turnout		49,743	62.78%	▲5.38
Total valid votes		48,303		
Rejected ballots		1,440	2.89%	▲0.36
Registered electors		79,228		▲9.45
JP gain from INC(I)		Swing	▼8.70	

=== Assembly Election 1978 ===
1978 Karnataka Legislative Assembly election : Chikkodi
Party	Candidate	Votes	%	±%
INC(I)	Parashuram Padmanna Hegre	22,345	55.17%	New
JP	Kamble Shripathi	13,104	32.36%	New
RPI(K)	Madhale Laxman Devarayappa	4,682	11.56%	New
Independent	Varale Shidleppa Babu	369	0.91%	New
Margin of victory		9,241	22.82%	▼13.84
Turnout		41,552	57.40%	▲0.83
Total valid votes		40,500		
Rejected ballots		1,052	2.53%	▲2.53
Registered electors		72,386		▲16.76
INC(I) gain from INC		Swing	▼9.50	

=== Assembly Election 1972 ===
1972 Mysore State Legislative Assembly election : Chikkodi
Party	Candidate	Votes	%	±%
INC	Parashuram Padmanna Hegre	22,005	64.67%	▼13.87
INC(O)	Pandit Seetaram Bagewadi	9,530	28.01%	New
ABJS	Sakharam Bhagoji Shinde	1,409	4.14%	New
Independent	Avinash Dattatray Katti	1,084	3.19%	New
Margin of victory		12,475	36.66%	▼26.24
Turnout		35,069	56.57%	▲2.84
Total valid votes		34,028		
Registered electors		61,994		▲15.50
INC hold		Swing	▼13.87	

=== Assembly Election 1967 ===
1967 Mysore State Legislative Assembly election : Chikkodi
Party	Candidate	Votes	%	±%
INC	S. B. Sidray	21,455	78.54%	▲36.06
RPI	M. A. Devaray	4,273	15.64%	New
Independent	H. P. Padmanna	1,589	5.82%	New
Margin of victory		17,182	62.90%	▲47.85
Turnout		28,841	53.73%	▼12.62
Total valid votes		27,317		
Registered electors		53,675		▲7.30
INC gain from Independent		Swing	▲21.02	

=== Assembly Election 1962 ===
1962 Mysore State Legislative Assembly election : Chikkodi
Party	Candidate	Votes	%	±%
Independent	Mallappa Virappa Shetti	17,994	57.52%	New
INC	Shankarrao Dadasaheb Kothaval Alias Dadoba	13,287	42.48%	▼9.68
Margin of victory		4,707	15.05%	▲10.74
Turnout		33,190	66.35%	▲1.43
Total valid votes		31,281		
Registered electors		50,022		▲14.71
Independent gain from INC		Swing	▲5.36	

=== Assembly Election 1957 ===
1957 Mysore State Legislative Assembly election : Chikkodi
Party	Candidate	Votes	%	±%
INC	Kothavale Shankar Rao Dada Saheb Alias Dadoba	14,766	52.16%	▲0.21
Independent	Shetti Mallappa Veerappa	13,545	47.84%	New
Margin of victory		1,221	4.31%	▼3.96
Turnout		28,311	64.92%	▼65.10
Total valid votes		28,311		
Registered electors		43,609		▼57.73
INC hold		Swing	▲24.42	

=== Assembly Election 1952 ===
1952 Bombay State Legislative Assembly election : Chikkodi
Party	Candidate	Votes	%	±%
INC	Kothavale Shankar Dadoba	37,217	27.74%	New
INC	Shreyakar Radhabai Maruti	32,473	24.21%	New
Independent	Desai Appasaheb Tulajaramrao	26,125	19.48%	New
SCF	Varale Balwant Hanmant	15,153	11.30%	New
Socialist Party (India)	Shetti Mallappa Veerappa	7,257	5.41%	New
Independent	Bhogale Peerappa Krishna	5,471	4.08%	New
Independent	Patil Malagouda Hari	4,214	3.14%	New
Independent	Honshetti Bhausaheb Devendra	3,678	2.74%	New
Independent	Pratap Shiddojirao Umajirao	2,553	1.90%	New
Margin of victory		11,092	8.27%	
Turnout		134,141	69.07%	
Total valid votes		134,141		
Registered electors		103,171		
INC win (new seat)				

== See also ==
- List of constituencies of the Karnataka Legislative Assembly
