= Talikoti Assembly constituency =

Former Assembly constituency in Karnataka, India

Coordinates: 16.476214°N 76.310990°E

Talikoti
- Former constituency for the State Legislative Assembly

Constituency details
- Country: India
- State: Mysore State
- Division: Belagavi
- District: Bijapur district
- Lok Sabha constituency: Bijapur
- Established: 1957
- Abolished: 1967
- Reservation: None

Talikoti Assembly constituency was one of the Karnataka Legislative Assemblies or Vidhan Sabha constituencies in Karnataka. It was part of Bijapur Lok Sabha constituency.

== Members of the Legislative Assembly ==
Election	Member	Party
1957	Kumargouda Adiveppagouda Patil	Independent politician
1962	Gadigeppagouda Ningangouda Patil	Indian National Congress

== Election results ==
=== Assembly Election 1962 ===
1962 Mysore State Legislative Assembly election : Talikot
Party	Candidate	Votes	%	±%
INC	Gadigeppagouda Ningangouda Patil	Unopposed		
Registered electors		48,825		▲5.65
INC win (new seat)				

=== Assembly Election 1957 ===
1957 Mysore State Legislative Assembly election : Talikot
Party	Candidate	Votes	%	±%
Independent	Kumargouda Adiveppagouda Patil	15,200	54.28%	New
INC	Vastrad Sharnayya Basalingayya	12,804	45.72%	New
Margin of victory		2,396	8.56%	
Turnout		28,004	60.60%	
Total valid votes		28,004		
Registered electors		46,213		
Independent win (new seat)				
