= 1957 Mysore State Legislative Assembly election =

1957 Mysore Legislative Assembly election
- 25 February 1957

All 208 seats in the Mysore Legislative Assembly 105 seats needed for a majority
- Turnout: 51.3%
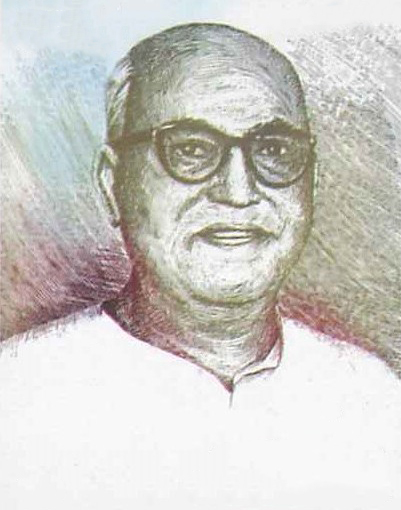
	First party	Second party
		PSP
Leader	S. Nijalingappa
Party	INC	PSP
Leader's seat	Molakalmuru
Last election	74	Did not contest
Seats won	150	18
Popular vote	33,43,839	9,02,373
Percentage	52.08%	14.06%
Chief Minister before election
S. Nijalingappa
INC
Elected Chief Minister
S. Nijalingappa
INC

Elections to the Mysore Legislative Assembly were held on 25 February 1957. 589 candidates contested for the 208 seats of the 179 constituencies in the Assembly.

== State reorganization ==
On 1 November 1956, Mysore state was enlarged by the addition of Kannada speaking areas like Coorg State, the Kollegal taluk of the Coimbatore district and the South Kanara district (except the Kasaragod taluk) of Madras State, the districts of Raichur, Gulbarga and Taluks of Bidar, Bhalki, Humnabad, Aurad and Basavakalyan from Bidar district of western Hyderabad State and the districts of Dharwar, Bijapur, North Kanara, and Belgaum, (except the Chandgad taluk of Belgaum district) from southern Bombay State under States Reorganisation Act, 1956. The Siruguppa taluk, the Bellary taluk, the Hospet taluk, and a small area of the Mallapuram sub-taluk were attached to the Mysore State. This resulted in an increase in assembly constituencies from 80 with 99 seats, to 179 with 208 seats in 1957 assembly elections.

== Constituencies ==
There were 29 two-member constituencies and 179 single-member constituencies. Out of the 179 constituencies, 27 were reserved for Scheduled Castes and 1 was reserved for Scheduled Tribe. There were 73,01,080 electors in single-member constituencies while 27,05,851 electors in two-member constituencies. Total electors in the state were 100,06,931 and the electors who were entitled to vote were 1,25,15,312 (including two-member constituencies). 39,59,518 electors voted in single-member constituency while 24,60,641 electors cast their vote in double-member constituencies. The poll percentage in the state was 51.3%.

== Results ==
Summary of results of the 1957 Mysore Legislative Assembly election
Political party	Flag	Seats contested	Won	Net change in seats	% of seats	Votes	Vote %	Change in vote %
Indian National Congress		207	150	▲76	72.12	33,43,839	52.08	▲5.73
Praja Socialist Party		79	18	New	8.65	9,02,373	14.06	New
Communist Party of India		20	1	0	0.48	1,23,403	1.92	▲1.01
Scheduled Caste Federation		6	2	0	0.96	83,542	1.30	▼0.44
Peasants and Workers Party of India		2	2	New	0.96	35,462	0.55	New
Independent		251	35	▲11	16.83	18,45,456	28.74	N/A
		Total seats	208 (▲109)	Voters	1,25,15,312	Turnout	64,20,159 (51.3%)	

=== District wise results ===
District	Seats					
District	Seats	INC	PSP	PWP	IND	OTH
Belagavi	18	7	—N/a	2	8	1
Uttara Kannada	5	5	—N/a	—N/a	—N/a	—N/a
Dharwad	17	16	—N/a	—N/a	1	—N/a
Bijapur	15	13	—N/a	—N/a	2	—N/a
Bidar	6	3	1	—N/a	2	—N/a
Gulbarga	13	10	—N/a	—N/a	3	—N/a
Raichur	10	10	—N/a	—N/a	—N/a	—N/a
Bellary	8	5	2	—N/a	1	—N/a
Chitradurga	9	5	3	—N/a	1	—N/a
Shimoga	7	7	—N/a	—N/a	—N/a	—N/a
Chikmagalur	5	4	—N/a	—N/a	1	—N/a
Hassan	8	4	2	—N/a	2	—N/a
Mandya	8	5	1	—N/a	2	—N/a
Tumkur	12	8	3	—N/a	1	—N/a
Kolar	12	5	—N/a	—N/a	5	2
Bangalore	24	18	3	—N/a	3	—N/a
Mysore	15	11	1	—N/a	3	—N/a
Coorg	2	2	—N/a	—N/a	—N/a	—N/a
South Kanara	14	12	2	—N/a	—N/a	—N/a
Total	208	150	18	2	35	3

=== Results by constituency ===
District	Constituency		Turnout	Winner				Runner-up				Margin
District	No.	Name	%	Candidate	Party	Votes	%	Candidate	Party	Votes	%	Margin
Belagavi	1	Athani	50.82	Jayawantrao Pawar	Ind	14,384	62.23	Ningappa Dalvai	INC	8,730	37.77	5,654
Belagavi	2	Raibag	60.88	V. L. Patil	Ind	37,070	32.62	Balachandra Shah	INC	23,152	20.38	13,918
Belagavi	2	Raibag	60.88	Sampatrao Talwalkar	SCF	32,553	28.65	Shivrudrappa Kambale	INC	18,593	16.36	13,960
Belagavi	3	Sadalga	74.96	Balaji Khot	Ind	17,714	50.26	Padmappa Gunjal	INC	17,529	49.74	185
Belagavi	4	Chikkodi	64.92	Shankar Rao Kothavale	INC	14,766	52.16	Mallappa Shetti	Ind	13,545	47.84	1,221
Belagavi	5	Nipani	74.19	Balvant Naik	Ind	26,069	76.14	Pandurang Patil	INC	7,737	22.60	18,332
Belagavi	6	Hukkeri	51.43	Malgouda Patil	INC	29,716	33.69	Bapusaheb Patil	Ind	16,172	18.33	13,544
Belagavi	6	Hukkeri	51.43	Champabai Bhogale	INC	26,097	29.59	Bandopant Tipakurle	SCF	13,812	15.66	12,285
Belagavi	7	Belgaum City	71.18	Balakrishna Sunthankar	Ind	22,179	58.22	Mohamed Husain Qazi	INC	15,915	41.78	6,264
Belagavi	8	Belgaum I	70.00	Vithal S. Patil	PWP	18,016	59.90	Vithal K. Patil	INC	12,063	40.10	5,953
Belagavi	9	Belgaum II	69.88	Nagendra Samaji	PWP	17,446	52.87	Shiyangoud Patil	INC	15,549	47.13	1,897
Belagavi	10	Gokak I	60.27	Ningappa Karlingannavar	INC	19,384	74.90	Gangadhar Hidkal	BJS	6,497	25.10	12,887
Belagavi	11	Gokak II	43.95	Appanna Panchagavi	INC	14,141	74.38	Rayappa Nayaki	Ind	3,141	16.52	11,000
Belagavi	12	Ramdurg	62.85	Mahadevappa Pattan	Ind	17,212	58.63	Venkaraddi Timmaraddi	INC	12,147	41.37	5,065
Belagavi	13	Parasgad	63.92	Shankarrao Padaki	Ind	16,274	52.69	Pramila Kamat	INC	14,610	47.31	1,664
Belagavi	14	Sampagaon I	63.97	Hemappa Joujalgi	INC	21,461	71.69	Madivalappa Hosur	PSP	8,474	28.31	12,987
Belagavi	15	Sampagaon II	—	Mugatsab Nagnur	INC	Unopposed		—				
Belagavi	16	Khanapur	62.16	Laxman Birje	Ind	26,401	67.31	Basappa Aragavi	INC	12,822	32.69	13,579
Uttara Kannada	17	Karwar	59.26	Sakharam Gaonkar	INC	11,832	37.77	Gopinath Pawar	Ind	11,340	36.20	492
Uttara Kannada	18	Ankola	53.45	Ramchandra Kamat	INC	16,715	54.08	Shiva Gunaga	PSP	9,657	31.25	7,058
Uttara Kannada	19	Kumta	55.43	Vasantlata Mirjankar	INC	14,034	45.99	Damodhar Chittal	PSP	8,938	29.29	5,096
Uttara Kannada	20	Honawar	59.03	Shamsuddin Jukaku	INC	16,172	51.70	Devendra Naik	PSP	10,287	32.88	5,885
Uttara Kannada	21	Sirsi	65.11	Ramakrishna Hegde	INC	21,974	72.64	Shriram Dhakappa	PSP	7,166	23.69	14,808
Dharwad	22	Hirekerur	62.26	Shankarrao Gubbi	INC	18,137	59.93	Basalingappagouda Patil	Ind	10,060	33.24	8,077
Dharwad	23	Ranibennur	57.34	Kallanagouda Patil	INC	33,937	35.59	Panchazarayya Madapurmath	Ind	19,804	20.77	14,133
Dharwad	23	Ranibennur	57.34	Yallawwa Sambrani	INC	28,988	30.40	Mallappa Gabbur	Ind	12,624	13.24	16,364
Dharwad	24	Hangal	66.80	Basanagouda Patil	Ind	13,152	51.67	Siddappa Sindhur	INC	12,303	48.33	849
Dharwad	25	Shiggaon	54.14	Rudgragouda Patil	INC	16,412	62.41	Gadigeppagouda Patil	Ind	9,884	37.59	6,528
Dharwad	26	Haveri	47.32	Shiddavva Mailar	INC	17,286	86.57	Panchaxarappa Walasangad	Ind	2,067	10.35	15,219
Dharwad	27	Shirahatti	64.59	Leelavati Magadi	INC	16,644	60.11	Siddaya Kashimath	Ind	8,343	30.13	8,301
Dharwad	28	Kundgol	62.41	Timmanna Kambali	INC	15,819	54.03	Kenchanagouda Nadger	Ind	13,458	45.97	2,361
Dharwad	29	Hubli City	55.84	Fakruddinsab Hussensab Mohsin	INC	17,609	64.96	Mahadevsa Jaratarghar	BJS	4,779	17.63	12,830
Dharwad	30	Hubli	60.72	P. M. Ramangouda	INC	20,858	68.96	Andaneppa Kabli	Ind	9,388	31.04	11,470
Dharwad	31	Kalghatgi	39.03	Basavannappa Tambakad	INC	16,928	84.64	Virappa Yavagal	Ind	1,842	9.21	15,086
Dharwad	32	Dharwad	60.84	Mallappa Inamati	INC	13,317	47.84	Basavaraj Desai	Ind	11,590	41.64	1,727
Dharwad	33	Navalgund	60.29	Ramanagouda Patil	INC	21,798	69.47	Malleshappa Koyppanvar	Ind	9,578	30.53	12,220
Dharwad	34	Nargund	50.86	Adiveppagouda Patil	INC	18,143	67.74	Shiddangouda Patil	Ind	8,640	32.26	9,503
Dharwad	35	Gadag	48.62	Kuberappa Gadag	INC	16,922	77.35	Ramchandra Jalihal	BJS	2,995	13.69	13,927
Dharwad	36	Mundargi	50.13	Chanabasappa Hulkoti	INC	18,926	84.30	Tirkappa Mirgani	Ind	3,526	15.70	15,400
Dharwad	37	Ron	70.77	Andanappa Doddameti	INC	17,836	55.82	Andanagouda Patil	Ind	14,116	44.18	3,720
Bijapur	38	Badami	62.72	Venkanagouda Patil	INC	18,460	60.73	Shankarappagouda Desai	Ind	11,938	39.27	6,522
Bijapur	39	Guledgud	64.51	Madivalappa Pattanshetti	INC	19,514	60.92	Lummanna Katti	Ind	12,520	39.08	6,994
Bijapur	40	Hungund	58.85	S. R. Kanthi	INC	17,467	61.18	Gadigeyya Nanjayyanamath	Ind	11,081	38.82	6,386
Bijapur	41	Bagalkot	59.60	Basappa Muranal	INC	21,177	69.64	Sharaschandra Saranaik	Ind	9,233	30.36	11,944
Bijapur	42	Mudhol	62.15	Hiralal Shah	INC	20,036	64.76	Krishnappa Nadgouda	Ind	10,904	35.24	9,132
Bijapur	43	Bilgi	64.72	Rachappa Desai	INC	24,732	79.12	Pavadeppa Bangi	Ind	6,527	20.88	18,205
Bijapur	44	Jamkhandi	63.28	B. D. Jatti	INC	15,481	55.16	Mahadevappa Murgod	Ind	12,587	44.84	2,894
Bijapur	45	Bijapur	54.02	Basavraj Nagur	Ind	11,827	50.86	Gous Mohiddin Madhaldar	INC	7,995	34.38	3,832
Bijapur	46	Tikota	52.88	Chanbasappa Ambli	INC	12,933	61.02	Basavraj Nagur	Ind	8,262	38.98	4,671
Bijapur	47	Basavana Bagevadi	51.02	Sushilabai Shah	INC	12,365	51.69	Ramanna Kallur	Ind	4,883	20.41	7,482
Bijapur	48	Muddebihal	55.29	Pranesh Sidhanti	INC	12,888	52.51	Shivabasavaswami Viraktamath	Ind	11,657	47.49	1,231
Bijapur	49	Talikot	60.60	Kumargouda Patil	Ind	15,200	54.28	Sharnayya Vastrad	INC	12,804	45.72	2,396
Bijapur	50	Indi	40.95	Mallappa Surpur	INC	23,033	33.12	Yeshawanta Rao Patil	Ind	16,390	23.57	6,643
Bijapur	50	Indi	40.95	Jattappa Kabadi	INC	17,402	25.02	Lachappa Sandimani	SCF	6,586	9.47	10,816
Bijapur	51	Sindagi	43.85	Shankargouda Patil	INC	10,149	48.61	Gavadappa Konnur	Ind	7,739	37.07	2,410
Bidar	52	Bhalki	44.93	Balwantrao	Ind	16,087	22.56	Bheemanna	PSP	14,493	20.32	1,594
Bidar	52	Bhalki	44.93	Sham Sunder	Ind	15,718	22.04	Sharanappa	PSP	13,444	18.85	2,274
Bidar	53	Bidar	26.06	Maqsood Ali Khan	INC	6,314	50.79	Rangnath Rao	Ind	3,758	30.23	2,556
Bidar	54	Hulsoor	47.64	Mahadeo Rao	PSP	12,114	58.54	Bhimarao	INC	8,578	41.46	3,536
Bidar	55	Kalyani	70.94	Annapurna Bai	INC	13,133	58.73	Zampa Bai	Ind	5,659	25.31	7,474
Bidar	56	Humnabad	42.97	Murlidhar Rao	INC	7,923	45.52	Vishwanath	Ind	5,229	30.04	2,694
Gulbarga	57	Chincholi	32.00	Veerendra Patil	INC	9,539	60.26	Saibanna Narsappa	Ind	6,291	39.74	3,248
Gulbarga	58	Aland	38.36	Ramchandra Veerappa	INC	18,920	29.18	Shivaram Sambhu	PSP	11,911	18.37	7,009
Gulbarga	58	Aland	38.36	Chandrashekhar S. Patil	INC	16,393	25.28	Hanmatrao Sharnappa	PSP	8,872	13.68	7,521
Gulbarga	59	Gulbarga	42.19	Mehtab Ali	INC	8,864	44.83	Gangadhar Namoshi	CPI	5,075	25.67	3,789
Gulbarga	60	Afzalpur	—	Anna Rao Ganamukhi	INC	Unopposed		—				
Gulbarga	61	Kalgi	30.82	Rachappa Shankarshetti	INC	9,044	62.95	Gulam Nabi Azad	CPI	4,030	28.05	5,014
Gulbarga	62	Chittapur	35.66	Vijaya Devi	INC	7,018	39.67	Shantappa Herur	Ind	5,629	31.82	1,389
Gulbarga	63	Sedam	37.60	Kollur Mallappa	INC	20,220	51.86	Vishwanath Reddy	Ind	18,768	48.14	1,452
Gulbarga	63	Sedam	37.60	Papiah Jamadanda	Ind	Unopposed		—				
Gulbarga	64	Jevargi	37.07	Sharangouda Sidramayya	Ind	7,326	41.71	Rudrappa Nagappa	INC	7,226	41.14	100
Gulbarga	65	Yadgir	45.24	Baswantaraya	Ind	12,600	52.08	Jagannath Rao	INC	11,595	47.92	1,005
Gulbarga	66	Shahapur	—	Virupakshappa	INC	Unopposed		—				
Gulbarga	67	Shorapur	51.94	Kumar Naik	INC	15,561	59.37	Mahant Swami	Ind	10,650	40.63	4,911
Raichur	68	Raichur	52.87	Bhimanna	INC	15,044	29.26	Basappa	Ind	6,797	13.22	8,247
Raichur	68	Raichur	52.87	Syed Easa	INC	13,744	26.73	M. Nagappa	Ind	8,254	16.05	5,490
Raichur	69	Devadurga	31.29	Shivanna	INC	9,595	58.03	Sidramappa	Ind	6,940	41.97	2,655
Raichur	70	Manvi	35.28	Baswarajeshwari	INC	9,023	47.07	Abdul Basit	Ind	4,964	25.90	4,059
Raichur	71	Lingsugur	44.33	Basangouda	INC	12,672	65.57	Shivshankar Rao	Ind	5,151	26.65	7,521
Raichur	72	Sindhanur	44.10	Baswantrao	INC	11,752	48.10	Amaregouda	Ind	8,129	33.27	3,623
Raichur	73	Kushtagi	47.61	Pundlikappa	INC	18,226	69.92	Basatappa	Ind	7,840	30.08	10,386
Raichur	74	Yelburga	62.22	Shankargouda Alwandi	INC	20,548	58.63	Veerabhadrappa Sirur	Ind	14,500	41.37	6,048
Raichur	75	Koppal	53.63	Mallikarjun Patil	INC	10,222	48.57	Pattadayya Huchappayyanmath	Ind	7,161	34.03	3,061
Raichur	76	Gangawati	43.57	Bhimsain Rao Desai	INC	12,862	60.28	Achappa	Ind	5,243	24.57	7,619
Bellary	77	Hadagali	70.06	M. P. Mariswamiah	INC	20,673	51.24	Channabasappa Angadi	PSP	19,671	48.76	1,002
Bellary	78	Hospet	69.10	R. Nagana Gowda	INC	15,656	53.69	Venkataswamy Murarai	Ind	13,505	46.31	2,151
Bellary	79	Siruguppa	56.20	B. E. Ramaiah	INC	18,361	59.95	C. M. Revana Siddaiah	PSP	10,416	34.01	7,945
Bellary	80	Kurugodu	69.33	Sumangalamma Allam	INC	18,332	58.61	Doddabasappa Kavithalada	Ind	12,946	41.39	5,386
Bellary	81	Bellary	60.83	Gangappa Mundlur	Ind	18,551	53.71	Abdur Razack	INC	14,984	43.39	3,567
Bellary	82	Sandur	50.82	H. Rayana Gouda	INC	13,955	50.58	K. R. Shadakshari Goud	Ind	10,101	36.61	3,854
Bellary	83	Harapanahalli	66.29	M. M. J. Sadyojathapaiah	PSP	38,550	27.23	Sirasappa Ijari	INC	33,988	24.01	4,562
Bellary	83	Harapanahalli	66.29	M. Danappa	PSP	36,162	25.55	M. Muniya Naik	INC	32,860	23.21	3,302
Chitradurga	84	Molakalmuru	65.11	S. Nijalingappa	INC	19,167	58.21	G. V. Anjanappa	PSP	13,758	41.79	5,409
Chitradurga	85	Challakere	57.21	A. Bheemappa Naik	INC	35,883	27.71	Mulka Govinda Reddy	Ind	31,170	24.07	4,713
Chitradurga	85	Challakere	57.21	T. Hanumaiah	INC	33,283	25.70	Yangatappa Vaddara	Ind	29,152	22.51	4,131
Chitradurga	86	Davanagere	61.77	K. T. Jambanna	PSP	19,568	58.75	Ganji Veerappa	INC	13,157	39.50	6,411
Chitradurga	87	Harihar	79.12	M. Ramappa	PSP	22,212	53.06	H. Siddaveerappa	INC	19,647	46.94	2,565
Chitradurga	88	Chitradurga	46.04	G. Sivappa	INC	30,638	32.53	C. Maleshiddappa	Ind	21,394	22.71	9,244
Chitradurga	88	Chitradurga	46.04	G. Duggappa	INC	24,640	26.16	D. N. Mallappa	Ind	10,768	11.43	13,872
Chitradurga	89	Hiriyur	69.92	K. Kenchappa	PSP	21,249	50.30	V. Masiyappa	INC	20,998	49.70	251
Chitradurga	90	Hosadurga	57.18	B. S. Shankarappa	Ind	12,727	47.96	Gangamma	INC	8,175	30.80	4,552
Shimoga	91	Channagiri	—	Kundur Rudrappa	INC	Unopposed		—				
Shimoga	92	Bhadravathi	54.86	D. T. Seetarama Rao	INC	15,002	50.81	M. P. Eswarappa	PSP	9,056	30.67	5,946
Shimoga	93	Shimoga	48.60	Ratnamma Madhava Rao	INC	13,223	53.61	C. L. Ramanna	BJS	5,849	23.71	7,374
Shimoga	94	Honnali	56.82	H. S. Rudrappa	INC	38,042	33.11	D. Paraemeshwarappa	PSP	16,704	14.54	21,338
Shimoga	94	Honnali	56.82	A. S. Dudhya Naik	INC	32,014	27.86	H. Hala Naik	PSP	11,763	10.24	20,251
Shimoga	95	Sagar	54.09	D. Mookappa	INC	16,473	54.47	Mariyappa	Ind	10,911	36.08	5,562
Shimoga	96	Tirthahalli	73.85	A. R. Badri Narayan	INC	23,131	61.37	J. S. Gopala Gouda	Ind	14,557	38.63	8,574
Chikmagalur	97	Sringeri	—	Kadidal Manjappa	INC	Unopposed		—				
Chikmagalur	98	Tarikere	58.67	T. R. Parameshwaraiah	INC	18,328	55.10	C. M. Chandrashekarappa	Ind	14,936	44.90	3,392
Chikmagalur	99	Chikmagalur	43.12	A. M. Basava Gowda	Ind	18,851	25.08	M. Huche Gowda	INC	17,041	22.67	1,810
Chikmagalur	99	Chikmagalur	43.12	L. H. Thimma Bovi	INC	17,495	23.28	G. Puttaswamy	Ind	7,236	9.63	10,259
Chikmagalur	100	Kadur	58.85	D. H. Rudrappa	INC	10,986	37.06	G. Marulappa	PSP	9,448	31.87	1,538
Hassan	101	Arsikere	59.08	A. R. Karisiddappa	INC	14,834	55.67	Y. Dharmappa	Ind	10,469	39.29	4,365
Hassan	102	Belur	58.83	B. N. Boranna Gowda	INC	33,144	30.42	B. G. Gurappa	Ind	32,755	30.06	389
Hassan	102	Belur	58.83	H. K. Siddaiah	INC	28,618	26.27	Kalasiah	Ind	10,720	9.84	17,898
Hassan	103	Arkalgud	56.18	Puttegowda	Ind	13,831	55.52	G. A. Thimmappagowda	INC	11,079	44.48	2,752
Hassan	104	Hassan	66.56	K. T. Dasappa	Ind	16,244	54.01	L. T. Karle	INC	13,070	43.46	3,174
Hassan	105	Gandasi	46.07	Dyavamma Manjappa	INC	8,388	34.38	H. R. Keshava Murthy	Ind	6,746	27.65	1,642
Hassan	106	Shravanabelagola	68.24	N. G. Narasimhegowda	PSP	16,923	57.32	K. Lakkappa	INC	7,086	24.00	9,837
Hassan	107	Holenarasipur	66.42	Y. Veerappa	PSP	17,233	59.24	A. G. Ramachandra	INC	11,857	40.76	5,376
Mandya	108	Krishnarajpete	61.39	M. K. Bomme Gowda	INC	17,419	59.57	N. Nanje Gowda	Ind	7,323	25.05	10,096
Mandya	109	Pandavapura	60.38	B. Chamaiah	PSP	12,677	43.94	Damayanthiyamma	INC	8,837	30.63	3,840
Mandya	110	Shrirangapattana	58.68	A. G. Chunche Gowda	Ind	18,280	61.82	A. G. Bandigowda	INC	11,290	38.18	6,990
Mandya	111	Mandya	63.64	G. S. Bomme Gowda	Ind	17,910	46.82	S. Channaiah	INC	16,035	41.92	1,875
Mandya	112	Malavalli	49.52	H. V. Veeregowda	INC	28,454	34.40	B. P. Nagaraja Murthy	PSP	12,449	15.05	16,005
Mandya	112	Malavalli	49.52	M. Malikarjnna Swamy	INC	27,102	32.76	M. Chikkalingaiah	SCF	9,723	11.75	17,379
Mandya	113	Maddur	61.46	H. K. Veeranna Gowda	INC	19,187	59.80	S. K. Chikkanna	PSP	12,900	40.20	6,287
Mandya	114	Nagamangala	67.07	T. Mariappa	INC	15,985	52.25	K. Mariappa	PSP	14,607	47.75	1,378
Tumkur	115	Turuvekere	70.24	T. Subramanya	INC	19,313	61.66	D. Shivana Gowda	PSP	12,010	38.34	7,303
Tumkur	116	Tiptur	57.75	K. P. Revanasiddappa	PSP	16,063	57.19	T. G. Thimme Gowda	INC	12,026	42.81	4,037
Tumkur	117	Chikkanayakanahalli	59.77	C. K. Rajaiasetty	PSP	14,856	50.93	C. H. Lingadevaru	INC	12,010	41.18	2,846
Tumkur	118	Sira	39.08	T. Taregowda	INC	33,195	38.13	Davanam Satyanarayana	Ind	7,022	8.07	26,173
Tumkur	118	Sira	39.08	P. Anjanappa	INC	24,926	28.63	C. Doddagobari Naik	BJS	6,739	7.74	18,187
Tumkur	119	Gubbi	52.33	C. J. Mukkannappa	Ind	8,521	32.16	Gatti Revanna	INC	6,972	26.31	1,549
Tumkur	120	Chandrashekarapura	53.15	N. Huchamasthy Gowda	INC	9,478	37.99	G. Thammanna	Ind	5,940	23.81	3,538
Tumkur	121	Kunigal	52.08	T. N. Mudalagiri Gowda	INC	8,371	33.99	Andanaiah	Ind	6,991	28.39	1,380
Tumkur	122	Tumkur	58.30	G. N. Puttanna	PSP	14,055	49.94	M. V. Rama Rao	INC	12,486	44.37	1,569
Tumkur	123	Hebbur	54.95	K. L. Narasimhaiah	INC	17,882	63.21	K. Lakkappa	PSP	10,409	36.79	7,473
Tumkur	124	Madhugiri	47.30	Mali Mariyappa	INC	26,807	28.19	T. S. Shivanna	PSP	22,501	23.66	4,306
Tumkur	124	Madhugiri	47.30	R. Channigaramaiah	INC	25,095	26.39	S. Anjaiah	PSP	20,682	21.75	4,413
Kolar	125	Gauribidanur	69.77	K. H. Venkata Reddy	Ind	25,203	66.69	N. C. Nagaiah Reddy	INC	11,476	30.37	13,727
Kolar	126	Chikballapur	51.01	S. Muni Raju	INC	29,149	27.20	C. V. Venkatarayappa	Ind	27,947	26.07	1,202
Kolar	126	Chikballapur	51.01	A. Muniyappa	INC	25,652	23.93	Bandi Muniyappa	Ind	24,436	22.80	1,216
Kolar	127	Sidlaghatta	61.00	J. Venkatappa	Ind	17,490	58.85	S. Avala Reddy	INC	12,230	41.15	5,260
Kolar	128	Chintamani	66.37	T. K. Gangi Reddy	Ind	16,411	51.62	M. C. Anjaneya Reddy	INC	12,595	39.62	3,816
Kolar	129	Mulbagal	43.28	B. L. Narayana Swamy	Ind	32,662	35.38	G. Narayana Gowda	INC	19,327	20.93	13,335
Kolar	129	Mulbagal	43.28	Narayanappa	INC	18,870	20.44	G. Narayanaswamy	Ind	16,902	18.31	1,968
Kolar	130	Kolar	45.61	D. Abdul Rasheed	INC	10,539	44.69	P. Venkatagiriappa	Ind	7,825	33.18	2,714
Kolar	131	Kolar Gold Field	50.56	M. C. Narasimhan	CPI	19,973	27.36	S. O. Bhagyanathan	INC	13,608	18.64	6,365
Kolar	131	Kolar Gold Field	50.56	C. M. Armugam	SCF	19,548	26.78	T. Channaiah	INC	13,053	17.88	6,495
Kolar	132	Bangarapet	47.89	E. Narayana Gowda	Ind	13,467	56.04	D. Venkataramaiah	INC	10,563	43.96	2,904
Kolar	133	Malur	42.63	H. C. Linga Reddy	INC	10,490	55.43	M. A. Krishnappa	Ind	8,434	44.57	2,056
Bangalore	134	Malleshwaram	43.06	T. Parthasarathy	Ind	10,552	42.80	K. S. Kumaran	INC	8,866	35.96	1,686
Bangalore	135	Gandhi Nagar	42.04	Nagarathnamma Hiremath	INC	12,679	62.81	J. Lingaiah	Ind	4,581	22.69	8,098
Bangalore	136	Chickpet	47.17	G. E. Hoover	Ind	10,537	51.75	R. Anantharaman	INC	9,825	48.25	712
Bangalore	137	Chamrajpet	34.49	Lakshmidevi Ramanna	INC	7,433	49.45	M. Rangaiah Naidu	Ind	5,296	35.23	2,137
Bangalore	138	Basavanagudi	43.76	L. S. Venkaji Rao	INC	10,804	58.51	C. S. Lakshminarayana Gupta	Ind	4,587	24.84	6,217
Bangalore	139	Cubbonpet	46.57	V. P. Deenadayalu Naidu	INC	9,596	51.95	B. Nanjappa	Ind	8,877	48.05	719
Bangalore	140	Halasuru	46.74	Grace Tucker	INC	8,977	48.66	K. Kannan	Ind	5,047	27.36	3,930
Bangalore	141	Broadway	42.93	Mohammad Shariff	INC	9,159	51.30	S. Hameed Shah	Ind	7,019	39.32	2,140
Bangalore	142	Bangalore North	34.46	K. V. Byregowda	INC	13,462	24.47	B. M. Anjanappa	Ind	11,128	20.22	2,334
Bangalore	142	Bangalore North	34.46	Y. Ramakrishna	INC	10,199	18.54	Anandu	CPI	4,747	8.63	5,452
Bangalore	143	Hosakote	52.74	S. R. Ramaiah	INC	29,100	30.13	H. V. Nanjiah	PSP	23,143	23.96	5,957
Bangalore	143	Hosakote	52.74	Rukmaniamma	INC	24,149	25.01	B. Channabyre Gowda	PSP	20,181	20.90	3,968
Bangalore	144	Doddaballapur	53.00	Totappa Siddalingiah	INC	17,527	64.55	T. C. Gangadharappa	BJS	6,084	22.41	11,443
Bangalore	145	Nelamangala	41.17	Alur Hanumanthappa	INC	29,458	42.99	Nanjappa	Ind	5,399	7.88	24,059
Bangalore	145	Nelamangala	41.17	M. Hanumanthaiah	INC	20,897	30.49	V. Chickayellappa	PSP	2,761	4.03	18,136
Bangalore	146	Magadi	64.72	B. Singri Gowda	PSP	16,165	55.73	T. D. Maranna	INC	12,843	44.27	3,322
Bangalore	147	Ramanagara	71.05	Kengal Hanumanthaiah	INC	20,865	63.66	B. T. Ramaiah	Ind	11,913	36.34	8,952
Bangalore	148	Channapatna	70.45	B. K. Puttaramaiah	PSP	16,343	51.19	B. J. Linge Gowda	INC	12,651	39.63	3,692
Bangalore	149	Virupakshipura	60.13	S. Kariappa	INC	15,484	58.41	B. L. Channe Gowda	PSP	11,027	41.59	4,457
Bangalore	150	Kanakapura	65.32	M. Linge Gowda	PSP	15,624	50.78	K. G. Thimme Gowda	INC	11,459	37.24	4,165
Bangalore	151	Bangalore South	34.69	A. V. Narasimha Reddy	INC	13,702	23.77	R. Rangappa Reddy	Ind	13,452	23.33	250
Bangalore	151	Bangalore South	34.69	B. Basavalingappa	INC	12,365	21.45	B. T. Kempa Raj	Ind	5,449	9.45	6,916
Bangalore	152	Anekal	56.28	J. C. Ramaswami Reddy	INC	11,686	45.29	S. Sharabhanna	Ind	9,706	37.62	1,980
Bangalore	153	Palya	52.27	G. Venkate Gowda	Ind	17,773	63.23	S. C. Viruprakshaiah	INC	10,337	36.77	7,436
Mysore	154	Kollegal	43.73	T. P. Boraiah	INC	27,147	31.72	K. P. Shantha Murthy	PSP	15,577	18.20	11,570
Mysore	154	Kollegal	43.73	Kempamma	INC	20,286	23.71	V. R. Puttaraju	PSP	14,424	16.86	5,862
Mysore	155	T. Narasipur	56.32	M. Rajasekara Murthy	INC	14,028	55.06	S. Sreenivasa Iyenger	PSP	11,448	44.94	2,580
Mysore	156	Mysore City	50.79	K. S. Suryanarayana Rao	INC	7,366	36.42	L. Srikanthiah	Ind	5,626	27.82	1,740
Mysore	157	Mysore City North	53.58	A. Mohammad Sait	Ind	7,400	36.17	Ahmad Ali Khan	INC	7,174	35.06	226
Mysore	158	Mysore	44.79	Kalastavadi Puttaswamy	INC	11,753	54.24	V. Srikantappa	PSP	5,755	26.56	5,998
Mysore	159	Nanjangud	55.78	P. Mahadevaiah	INC	15,391	63.22	B. N. S. Aradhya	PSP	8,955	36.78	6,436
Mysore	160	Biligere	44.34	G. M. Chinnaswamy	Ind	6,476	33.06	J. B. Mallaradhya	PSP	5,857	29.90	619
Mysore	161	Chamarajanagar	46.72	U. M. Madappa	PSP	21,648	26.39	Venkataranganaika	INC	16,413	20.01	5,235
Mysore	161	Chamarajanagar	46.72	B. Rachaiah	INC	18,874	23.01	B. Basavaiah	PSP	18,832	22.95	42
Mysore	162	Gundlupet	72.74	K. S. Nagarathnamma	Ind	24,955	65.66	H. K. Shivarudrappa	INC	13,053	34.34	11,902
Mysore	163	Hunasuru	45.10	D. Devaraj Urs	INC	21,259	24.14	K. Lingappa	Ind	19,874	22.57	1,385
Mysore	163	Hunasuru	45.10	N. Rachiah	INC	20,583	23.38	S. Kuntaiah	Ind	13,333	15.14	7,250
Mysore	164	Krishnarajanagara	68.63	H. M. Channabasappa	INC	18,615	54.94	K. S. Gowdaiah	Ind	12,659	37.36	5,956
Mysore	165	Periyapatna	58.01	N. R. Somanna	INC	19,714	68.08	T. Venkataram	Ind	9,244	31.92	10,470
Coorg	166	Virajpet	71.30	C. M. Poonacha	INC	18,223	54.85	Karumbayya Kolera	PSP	15,002	45.15	3,221
Coorg	167	Madikeri	67.78	K. Mallapa	INC	20,039	51.70	Y. T. Aiyappa	CPI	14,947	38.56	5,092
South Kanara	168	Puttur	44.43	Subbaya Naik	INC	29,763	33.15	Aithappa Naik	BJS	10,759	11.98	19,004
South Kanara	168	Puttur	44.43	K. Venkatramana Gowda	INC	28,691	31.96	Rama Bhat	BJS	11,684	13.01	17,007
South Kanara	169	Belthangady	51.98	Ratnavarma Heggade	INC	20,563	69.75	Ramanath Shenoy	Ind	8,920	30.25	11,643
South Kanara	170	Panemangalore	61.52	K. Nagappa Alva	INC	19,533	58.63	M. H. Krishnappa	CPI	13,782	41.37	5,751
South Kanara	171	Mangalore I	54.96	Bantwal Vaikunta Baliga	INC	16,365	48.94	A. Shantharam Pai	CPI	10,364	30.99	6,001
South Kanara	172	Mangalore II	58.97	Gajanan Pandit	INC	20,332	58.33	B. V. Kakkilaya	CPI	14,526	41.67	5,806
South Kanara	173	Surathkal	51.83	B. R. Karkera	INC	15,629	57.00	Sanjeevanath Aikal	PSP	11,789	43.00	3,840
South Kanara	174	Kaup	60.12	Denis Pinto	INC	18,761	62.79	M. Navinchandra	PSP	7,170	24.00	11,591
South Kanara	175	Udupi	69.28	Upendra Nayak	PSP	17,598	56.97	P. V. Achar	INC	13,291	43.03	4,307
South Kanara	176	Brahmavar	53.84	Jagajjeevandas Shetty	INC	16,964	61.93	Sheenappa Shetty	PSP	10,429	38.07	6,535
South Kanara	177	Kundapura	59.11	V. Srinivasa Shetty	PSP	16,693	50.65	K. Suryanarayana Adiga	INC	16,266	49.35	427
South Kanara	178	Byndoor	—	Y. Manjayya Shetty	INC	Unopposed		—				
South Kanara	179	Karkala	45.31	Kanthappa Hegde	INC	26,696	62.82	Devaraya Sheonoy	PSP	15,801	37.18	10,895
South Kanara	179	Karkala	45.31	Manjappa Ullal	INC	Unopposed		—				

== See also ==
- 1957 elections in India
- Mysore State
- 1952 Mysore Legislative Assembly election
