= Mundargi Assembly constituency =

Former Assembly constituency in Karnataka, India

Coordinates: 15.206757°N 75.885121°E

Mundargi
- Former constituency No. 187 for the Karnataka Legislative Assembly

Constituency details
- Country: India
- Region: South India
- State: Karnataka
- Division: Belgaum
- District: Dharwad
- Lok Sabha constituency: Koppal
- Established: 1957
- Abolished: 2008
- Reservation: None

Mundargi Assembly constituency was one of the constituencies in Karnataka state assembly in India until 2008 when it was made defunct. It was part of Koppal Lok Sabha constituency.

== Members of the Legislative Assembly ==
Election	Member	Party
1952	Chanabasappa Sadashivappa Hulkoti	Indian National Congress
1957	Chanabasappa Sadashivappa Hulkoti	Indian National Congress
1962	Chanabasappa Sadashivappa Hulkoti	Indian National Congress
1967	C. C. Mahantayya	Indian National Congress
1972	Kurudigi Kuberappa Hanamantappa	Indian National Congress
1978	Bhavi Vasantappa Basappa	Indian National Congress
1983	Kurudigi Kuberappa Hanamantappa	Indian National Congress
1985	Humbarawadi Nagappa Shivalingappa	Janata Party
1989	Kurudigi Kuberappa Hanamantappa	Indian National Congress
1994	Shidlinganagouda Shiddanagouda Patil	Janata Dal
1999	Shidlinganagouda Shiddanagouda Patil	Janata Dal
2004	Shidlinganagouda Shiddanagouda Patil	Indian National Congress

== Election results ==
=== Assembly Election 2004 ===
2004 Karnataka Legislative Assembly election : Mundargi
Party	Candidate	Votes	%	±%
INC	Shidlinganagouda Shiddanagouda Patil	40,287	45.72%	▼1.89
JD(S)	Dandin Bishtappa Fakirappa	21,071	23.91%	▲22.31
BJP	Dr. Shekar Sajjanar	14,522	16.48%	New
Independent	Rathod Bheemasingh	5,813	6.60%	New
Kannada Nadu Party	Basavanneppa Somappa Chinchali	2,609	2.96%	New
JP	Bagali Khatunabi Pheerasab	1,669	1.89%	New
Independent	Vasanagouda Ninganagouda Bhandi	1,413	1.60%	New
Urs Samyuktha Paksha	Bandi Sahadevappa Veerappa	733	0.83%	New
Margin of victory		19,216	21.81%	▲19.57
Turnout		88,121	65.10%	▼5.62
Total valid votes		88,117		
Registered electors		135,362		▲12.46
INC gain from JD(U)		Swing	▼4.13	

=== Assembly Election 1999 ===
1999 Karnataka Legislative Assembly election : Mundargi
Party	Candidate	Votes	%	±%
JD(U)	Shidlinganagouda Shiddanagouda Patil	41,032	49.85%	New
INC	Kuradagi Vasappa Kuberappa	39,188	47.61%	▲33.78
JD(S)	Padagad Ningappa Kottrappa	1,321	1.60%	New
Independent	Kotragouda Siddanagouda Patil	767	0.93%	New
Margin of victory		1,844	2.24%	▼6.13
Turnout		85,123	70.72%	▲1.63
Total valid votes		82,308		
Rejected ballots		2,779	3.26%	▲0.27
Registered electors		120,365		▲4.83
JD(U) gain from JD		Swing	▲22.37	

=== Assembly Election 1994 ===
1994 Karnataka Legislative Assembly election : Mundargi
Party	Candidate	Votes	%	±%
JD	Shidlinganagouda Shiddanagouda Patil	21,145	27.48%	▲0.55
Independent	Goudar Yallanagouda Ninganagouda	14,706	19.11%	New
Independent	Chandrashekarappa Basappa Badni	12,633	16.42%	New
INC	Kurudigi Kuberappa Hanamantappa	10,641	13.83%	▼20.99
KRRS	Ullagaddi Chandrahas Bharamappa	9,393	12.21%	New
Independent	Bellad Andanappa Kallappa	2,981	3.87%	New
INC	Mulla Paravesahamed Dastagirsab	2,143	2.78%	New
BJP	Bhavi Vasant Basappa	1,152	1.50%	New
JP	Valikar Basavaraj Beerappa	738	0.96%	New
Margin of victory		6,439	8.37%	▲5.98
Turnout		79,325	69.09%	▲0.43
Total valid votes		76,950		
Rejected ballots		2,375	2.99%	▼0.03
Registered electors		114,814		▲6.85
JD gain from INC		Swing	▼7.34	

=== Assembly Election 1989 ===
1989 Karnataka Legislative Assembly election : Mundargi
Party	Candidate	Votes	%	±%
INC	Kurudigi Kuberappa Hanamantappa	24,914	34.82%	▼1.49
Kranti Sabha	Ullagaddi Chandrahas Bharamappa	23,203	32.43%	New
JD	Shidlinganagouda Shiddanagouda Patil	19,266	26.93%	New
JP	Humbarawadi Nagappa Shivalingappa	2,180	3.05%	New
Independent	Halakeri Shanmukhappa Andanappa Patil Krishtagouda	610	0.85%	New
Independent	Patil Krishtagouda Ranganagouda	553	0.77%	New
Margin of victory		1,711	2.39%	▼21.91
Turnout		73,772	68.66%	▼4.40
Total valid votes		71,544		
Rejected ballots		2,228	3.02%	▲0.85
Registered electors		107,451		▲26.63
INC gain from JP		Swing	▼25.80	

=== Assembly Election 1985 ===
1985 Karnataka Legislative Assembly election : Mundargi
Party	Candidate	Votes	%	±%
JP	Humbarawadi Nagappa Shivalingappa	36,764	60.62%	New
INC	Kuradgi Kuberappa	22,023	36.31%	▼9.60
Independent	Tofin Vijay Fakirappa	569	0.94%	New
Independent	Tadedamath Gangayya Fakirayya	441	0.73%	New
Independent	Lamani Laxman Thavarappa	364	0.60%	New
Margin of victory		14,741	24.30%	▲17.43
Turnout		61,997	73.06%	▲5.12
Total valid votes		60,651		
Rejected ballots		1,346	2.17%	▼1.25
Registered electors		84,856		▲9.88
JP gain from INC		Swing	▲14.71	

=== Assembly Election 1983 ===
1983 Karnataka Legislative Assembly election : Mundargi
Party	Candidate	Votes	%	±%
INC	Kurudigi Kuberappa Hanamantappa	23,264	45.91%	▲26.18
Independent	Humbarwadi Nagappa	19,784	39.04%	New
Independent	Kavalur Shankrappa Veerappa	1,591	3.14%	New
Independent	Hadimani Hanamappa Siddappa	1,450	2.86%	New
Independent	Pujar Ramachandra Lokappa	1,272	2.51%	New
Independent	Manashetra Basavaraj Anadanashetti	992	1.96%	New
Independent	Karabhari Devaraj Thakareppa	739	1.46%	New
Independent	Doddamani Veerappaagappa	406	0.80%	New
Independent	Tadedamath Gangayya Fakirayya	374	0.74%	New
Margin of victory		3,480	6.87%	▲5.42
Turnout		52,468	67.94%	▼2.20
Total valid votes		50,671		
Rejected ballots		1,797	3.42%	▼0.88
Registered electors		77,229		▲6.54
INC gain from INC(I)		Swing	▲6.72	

=== Assembly Election 1978 ===
1978 Karnataka Legislative Assembly election : Mundargi
Party	Candidate	Votes	%	±%
INC(I)	Bhavi Vasantappa Basappa	19,069	39.19%	New
JP	Dandin Bishtappa Fakirappa	18,363	37.74%	New
INC	Kurudigi Kuberappa Hanamantappa	9,598	19.73%	▼40.73
Independent	Baraker Honnappa Durgarappa	1,622	3.33%	New
Margin of victory		706	1.45%	▼22.39
Turnout		50,839	70.14%	▼0.63
Total valid votes		48,652		
Rejected ballots		2,187	4.30%	▲4.30
Registered electors		72,485		▲5.76
INC(I) gain from INC		Swing	▼21.27	

=== Assembly Election 1972 ===
1972 Mysore State Legislative Assembly election : Mundargi
Party	Candidate	Votes	%	±%
INC	Kurudigi Kuberappa Hanamantappa	28,054	60.46%	▲0.56
INC(O)	R. G. Gulappa	16,993	36.62%	New
ABJS	Neelanagouda Fakiragouda	1,355	2.92%	New
Margin of victory		11,061	23.84%	▲4.04
Turnout		48,500	70.77%	▼3.58
Total valid votes		46,402		
Registered electors		68,536		▲10.62
INC hold		Swing	▲0.56	

=== Assembly Election 1967 ===
1967 Mysore State Legislative Assembly election : Mundargi
Party	Candidate	Votes	%	±%
INC	C. C. Mahantayya	26,220	59.90%	▼6.56
Independent	P. M. Martandagouda	17,552	40.10%	New
Margin of victory		8,668	19.80%	▼19.16
Turnout		46,064	74.35%	▲19.70
Total valid votes		43,772		
Registered electors		61,955		▲13.92
INC hold		Swing	▼6.56	

=== Assembly Election 1962 ===
1962 Mysore State Legislative Assembly election : Mundargi
Party	Candidate	Votes	%	±%
INC	Chanabasappa Sadashivappa Hulkoti	18,303	66.46%	▼17.84
Independent	Tamminagouda Yallappagouda Patil	7,574	27.50%	New
ABJS	Venkatesh Basudev Joshi	1,663	6.04%	New
Margin of victory		10,729	38.96%	▼29.63
Turnout		29,723	54.65%	▲4.52
Total valid votes		27,540		
Registered electors		54,383		▲21.43
INC hold		Swing	▼17.84	

=== Assembly Election 1957 ===
1957 Mysore State Legislative Assembly election : Mundargi
Party	Candidate	Votes	%	±%
INC	Chanabasappa Sadashivappa Hulkoti	18,926	84.30%	▲21.71
Independent	Mirgani Tirkappa Fakirappa	3,526	15.70%	New
Margin of victory		15,400	68.59%	▲35.73
Turnout		22,452	50.13%	▼16.19
Total valid votes		22,452		
Registered electors		44,785		▼3.54
INC hold		Swing	▲21.71	

=== Assembly Election 1952 ===
1952 Bombay State Legislative Assembly election : Gadag Mundargi
Party	Candidate	Votes	%	±%
INC	Chanabasappa Sadashivappa Hulkoti	19,270	62.59%	New
KMPP	Patil, Fakirgouda Goudappagouda	9,152	29.72%	New
Independent	Patil, Dattatraya Gururao	2,368	7.69%	New
Margin of victory		10,118	32.86%	
Turnout		30,790	66.32%	
Total valid votes		30,790		
Registered electors		46,429		
INC win (new seat)				

== See also ==
- List of constituencies of the Karnataka Legislative Assembly
