= Broadway Assembly constituency =

Former constituency in Karnataka, India

Coordinates: 12.988271°N 77.603150°E

Broadway
- Former constituency for the State Legislative Assembly

Constituency details
- Country: India
- State: Mysore State
- District: Bangalore
- Lok Sabha constituency: Bangalore City
- Established: 1957
- Abolished: 1967
- Reservation: None

Broadway Assembly constituency was one of the vidhana sabha constituencies in the state assembly of Mysore State, in India. It was part of Bangalore City Lok Sabha constituency.

== Members of the Legislative Assembly ==
Election	Member	Party
1957	Mohammad Shariff	Indian National Congress
1962	H. R. Abdul Gaffar	Indian National Congress

== Election results ==
=== Assembly Election 1962 ===
1962 Mysore State Legislative Assembly election : Broadway
Party	Candidate	Votes	%	±%
INC	H. R. Abdul Gaffar	6,243	27.86%	▼23.44
Independent	H. Syed Ahamed	4,718	21.06%	New
SWA	N. Neelaveni	3,489	15.57%	New
Independent	D. Ponnurangam	2,862	12.77%	New
PSP	S. Hameed Shah	2,529	11.29%	New
DMK	S. V. Pathy	2,265	10.11%	New
Independent	N. R. Murthy	300	1.34%	New
Margin of victory		1,525	6.81%	▼5.18
Turnout		23,326	56.74%	▲13.81
Total valid votes		22,406		
Registered electors		41,111		▼1.15
INC hold		Swing	▼23.44	

=== Assembly Election 1957 ===
1957 Mysore State Legislative Assembly election : Broadway
Party	Candidate	Votes	%	±%
INC	Mohammad Shariff	9,159	51.30%	New
Independent	S. Hameed Shah	7,019	39.32%	New
Independent	M. Nagaraj	1,675	9.38%	New
Margin of victory		2,140	11.99%	
Turnout		17,853	42.93%	
Total valid votes		17,853		
Registered electors		41,589		
INC win (new seat)				
