= Halasuru Assembly constituency =

Former constituency in Karnataka, India

Coordinates: 12.977076°N 77.625351°E

Ulsoor
- Former constituency for the State Legislative Assembly

Constituency details
- Country: India
- State: Mysore State
- District: Bangalore
- Lok Sabha constituency: Bangalore City
- Established: 1951
- Abolished: 1967
- Reservation: None

Ulsoor Assembly constituency was one of the Vidhan Sabha constituencies in the state assembly of Mysore State, in India. It was part of Bangalore City Lok Sabha constituency.

== Members of the Legislative Assembly ==
Election	Member	Party
1952	M. Palaniappan	Indian National Congress
1957	Grace Tucker	Indian National Congress
1962	Grace Tucker	Indian National Congress

== Election results ==
=== Assembly Election 1962 ===
1962 Mysore State Legislative Assembly election : Halasuru
Party	Candidate	Votes	%	±%
INC	Grace Tucker	6,753	27.10%	▼21.56
Independent	D. Bashkaran	6,177	24.79%	New
PSP	K. Kannan	6,078	24.39%	New
SWA	R. C. Paranjothi	2,403	9.64%	New
Independent	P. Ramamurthy	1,759	7.06%	New
Socialist Party (India)	B. K. Sriramaiah	1,531	6.14%	New
Independent	Kulashekharan	220	0.88%	New
Margin of victory		576	2.31%	▼18.99
Turnout		25,733	59.78%	▲13.04
Total valid votes		24,921		
Registered electors		43,048		▲9.07
INC hold		Swing	▼21.56	

=== Assembly Election 1957 ===
1957 Mysore State Legislative Assembly election : Halasuru
Party	Candidate	Votes	%	±%
INC	Grace Tucker	8,977	48.66%	▲11.77
Independent	K. Kannan	5,047	27.36%	New
Independent	D. Bhaskaran	4,424	23.98%	New
Margin of victory		3,930	21.30%	▲3.19
Turnout		18,448	46.74%	▼0.71
Total valid votes		18,448		
Registered electors		39,470		▼5.44
INC hold		Swing	▲11.77	

=== Assembly Election 1952 ===
1952 Mysore State Legislative Assembly election : Halasuru
Party	Candidate	Votes	%	±%
INC	M. Palaniappan	7,307	36.89%	New
Independent	Thamarai Kannan Doraiswamy	3,720	18.78%	New
Independent	Mohamed Ismail Tabish	2,640	13.33%	New
Independent	M. B. Singh	2,408	12.16%	New
Socialist Party (India)	K. Kannan	1,968	9.94%	New
KMPP	U. K. Kalappa	1,266	6.39%	New
Independent	A. M. Dharmalingam	496	2.50%	New
Margin of victory		3,587	18.11%	
Turnout		19,805	47.45%	
Total valid votes		19,805		
Registered electors		41,742		
INC win (new seat)				
