= Palya Assembly constituency =

Former Assembly constituency in Karnataka, India

Coordinates: 12.178654°N 77.175848°E

Palya
- Former constituency for the State Legislative Assembly

Constituency details
- Country: India
- State: Mysore State
- Division: Mysore
- District: Mysore
- Lok Sabha constituency: Chamarajanagar
- Established: 1957
- Abolished: 1967
- Reservation: None

Palya Assembly constituency was one of the constituencies in Mysore state assembly in India until 1967 when it was made defunct. It was part of Chamarajanagar Lok Sabha constituency.

== Members of Assembly ==
=== Mysore State ===
Year	Member	Party
Until 1957: Seat does not exist. See Kollegal
1957	G. Venkate Gowda	Independent politician
1962	G. Venkate Gowda	Independent politician
1967 onwards: Seat does not exist. See Hanur

== Election results ==
=== Assembly Election 1962 ===
1962 Mysore State Legislative Assembly election : Palya
Party	Candidate	Votes	%	±%
Independent	G. Venkatai Gowda	19,132	50.09%	New
INC	H. Nagappa	19,065	49.91%	▲13.14
Margin of victory		67	0.18%	▼26.28
Turnout		39,602	68.58%	▲16.31
Total valid votes		38,197		
Registered electors		57,745		▲7.37
Independent hold		Swing	▼13.14	

=== Assembly Election 1957 ===
1957 Mysore State Legislative Assembly election : Palya
Party	Candidate	Votes	%	±%
Independent	G. Venkate Gowda	17,773	63.23%	New
INC	S. C. Viruprakshaiah	10,337	36.77%	New
Margin of victory		7,436	26.45%	
Turnout		28,110	52.27%	
Total valid votes		28,110		
Registered electors		53,782		
Independent win (new seat)				

== See also ==
- List of constituencies of the Mysore Legislative Assembly
