= Gokak II Assembly constituency =

Former constituency in Karnataka, India

Coordinates: 16.164942°N 74.823850°E

Gokak II
- Former constituency for the State Legislative Assembly

Constituency details
- Country: India
- State: Mysore State
- District: Belagavi
- Lok Sabha constituency: Belagavi
- Established: 1957
- Abolished: 1967
- Reservation: None

Gokak II Assembly constituency was one of the Vidhan Sabha seats in the state assembly of Mysore, in India. It was part of Belagavi Lok Sabha constituency, which is adjacent to Chikkodi Lok Sabha constituency.

== Members of the Legislative Assembly ==
Election	Member	Party
1957	Panchagavi Appanna Ramappa	Indian National Congress
1962	Panchagavi Appanna Ramappa	Indian National Congress

== Election results ==
=== Assembly Election 1962 ===
1962 Mysore State Legislative Assembly election : Gokak II
Party	Candidate	Votes	%	±%
INC	Panchagavi Appanna Ramappa	18,420	82.39%	▲8.01
Independent	Kamappa Bhimappa Hosamani	2,754	12.32%	New
Lok Sewak Sangh	Nayakapa Rayappa Nayaki	1,182	5.29%	New
Margin of victory		15,666	70.08%	▲12.22
Turnout		23,807	48.33%	▲4.38
Total valid votes		22,356		
Registered electors		49,259		▲13.88
INC hold		Swing	▲8.01	

=== Assembly Election 1957 ===
1957 Mysore State Legislative Assembly election : Gokak II
Party	Candidate	Votes	%	±%
INC	Panchagavi Appanna Ramappa	14,141	74.38%	New
Independent	Nayakapa Rayappa Nayaki	3,141	16.52%	New
PSP	Konnur Shantharayan. S	1,730	9.10%	New
Margin of victory		11,000	57.86%	
Turnout		19,012	43.95%	
Total valid votes		19,012		
Registered electors		43,254		
INC win (new seat)				
