= Biligere Assembly constituency =

Former Assembly constituency in Karnataka, India

Coordinates: 12.153053°N 76.801943°E

Biligere
- Former constituency No. 112 for the State Legislative Assembly

Constituency details
- Country: India
- State: Mysore state
- Division: Mysore
- District: Mysore
- Lok Sabha constituency: Chamarajanagar
- Established: 1957
- Abolished: 1978
- Reservation: None

Biligere Assembly constituency was one of the constituencies in Mysore state assembly in India until 1978 when it was made defunct. It was part of Chamarajanagar Lok Sabha constituency.

== Members of the Legislative Assembly ==
Election	Member	Party
1957	G. M. Chinnaswamy	Independent politician
1962	D. M. Siddaiah	Indian National Congress
1967	D. M. Siddaiah	Indian National Congress
1972	N. S. Gurusiddappa	Independent politician

== Election results ==
=== Assembly Election 1972 ===
1972 Mysore State Legislative Assembly election : Biligere
Party	Candidate	Votes	%	±%
Independent	N. S. Gurusiddappa	17,105	47.34	New
INC	M. Krishnaiah	16,540	45.78	▲0.32
Independent	N. S. Veerasbhadraiah	1,789	4.95	New
Independent	R. Rajanaika	699	1.93	New
Margin of victory		565	1.56	▼7.10
Turnout		37,623	60.09	▼2.48
Total valid votes		36,133		
Registered electors		62,611		▲11.30
Independent gain from INC		Swing	▲1.88	

=== Assembly Election 1967 ===
1967 Mysore State Legislative Assembly election : Biligere
Party	Candidate	Votes	%	±%
INC	D. M. Siddaiah	14,793	45.46	▼35.80
Independent	N. S. Gurusiddappa	11,975	36.80	New
Independent	M. Krishnaiah	5,776	17.75	New
Margin of victory		2,818	8.66	▼61.78
Turnout		35,200	62.57	▲19.13
Total valid votes		32,544		
Registered electors		56,256		▲20.34
INC hold		Swing	▼35.80	

=== Assembly Election 1962 ===
1962 Mysore State Legislative Assembly election : Biligere
Party	Candidate	Votes	%	±%
INC	D. M. Siddaiah	15,417	81.26	▲61.42
Independent	C. Devaiah	2,053	10.82	New
Independent	G. Puttanna	956	5.04	New
SWA	N. C. Sanjeevan	547	2.88	New
Margin of victory		13,364	70.44	▲67.28
Turnout		20,308	43.44	▼0.90
Total valid votes		18,973		
Registered electors		46,746		▲5.84
INC gain from Independent		Swing	▲48.20	

=== Assembly Election 1957 ===
1957 Mysore State Legislative Assembly election : Biligere
Party	Candidate	Votes	%	±%
Independent	G. M. Chinnaswamy	6,476	33.06	New
PSP	J. B. Mallaradhya	5,857	29.90	New
INC	H. Madappa	3,885	19.84	New
Independent	C. Devaiah	3,368	17.20	New
Margin of victory		619	3.16	
Turnout		19,586	44.34	
Total valid votes		19,586		
Registered electors		44,168		
Independent win (new seat)				

== See also ==
- List of constituencies of the Mysore Legislative Assembly
