= Parasgad Assembly constituency =

Former Assembly constituency in Karnataka, India

Coordinates: 15.75°N 75.14°E

Parasgad
- Former constituency for the Karnataka Legislative Assembly

Constituency details
- Country: India
- Region: South India
- State: Karnataka
- Lok Sabha constituency: Belagavi
- Established: 1951
- Abolished: 2008
- Reservation: None

Parasgad Assembly constituency was a constituency of the Legislative Assembly in the Indian state of Karnataka. The constituency ceased to exist in 2008, following the redrawing of constituency boundaries. It was a part of the larger Belagavi Lok Sabha constituency. It was succeeded by Saundatti Yellamma Assembly constituency.

== Members of the Legislative Assembly ==
Election	Member	Party
1952	Kaujalgi Hemappa Veerbhadrappa	Indian National Congress
1957	Padaki Shankarrao Bindurao	Independent politician
1962	Venkaraddi Shidaraddi Timmaraddi	Indian National Congress
1967	K. H. Veerabhadrappa	Indian National Congress
1972	Padaki Shankarrao Bindurao	Indian National Congress
1978	Gudanshah Khanashah Takked	Indian National Congress
1983	Ramanagouda Venkanagouda Patil	Indian National Congress
1985	Chandrashekhar Mallikarjun Mamani	Independent politician
1989	Koujalgi Subhash Siddramappa	Indian National Congress
1994	Chandrashekhar Mallikarjun Mamani	Janata Dal
1999	Koujalgi Subhash Siddramappa	Independent politician
2004	Mamani Vishwanath Karabasappa	Independent politician

== Election results ==
=== Assembly Election 2004 ===
2004 Karnataka Legislative Assembly election : Parasgad
Party	Candidate	Votes	%	±%
Independent	Mamani Vishwanath Karabasappa	38,451	34.24	New
INC	Koujalgi Subhash Siddramappa	37,006	32.95	▲14.71
BJP	Bali Virupaxappa Balappa	21,500	19.14	▲7.93
JD(S)	Fakidrappa Laxmappa Mallad	10,435	9.29	▲1.90
Independent	Talawar Ningappa Basappa	1,849	1.65	New
Kannada Nadu Party	Chikkummi Irappa Basappa	1,263	1.12	New
Independent	Karalagi Shivappa Ramappa	1,228	1.09	New
Margin of victory		1,445	1.29	▼16.08
Turnout		112,359	69.62	▼0.34
Total valid votes		112,303		
Registered electors		161,400		▲2.37
Independent hold		Swing	▼5.07	

=== Assembly Election 1999 ===
1999 Karnataka Legislative Assembly election : Parasgad
Party	Candidate	Votes	%	±%
Independent	Koujalgi Subhash Siddramappa	39,846	39.31	New
Independent	Mamani Gangutai Chandrashekhar	22,239	21.94	New
INC	Ramanagouda Venkanagouda Patil	18,490	18.24	▼21.50
BJP	Shankaragouda Shrinivasagouda Patilpadaki	11,367	11.21	▲8.20
JD(S)	Govannavar Kashappa Shivappa	7,489	7.39	New
Independent	Anasuya Malleshappa Kitadal	1,031	1.02	New
Independent	Chandrashekarappa Hanamappa Chalawadi	897	0.88	New
Margin of victory		17,607	17.37	▲6.67
Turnout		110,300	69.96	▼2.51
Total valid votes		101,359		
Rejected ballots		8,941	8.11	▲5.81
Registered electors		157,670		▲13.53
Independent gain from JD		Swing	▼11.13	

=== Assembly Election 1994 ===
1994 Karnataka Legislative Assembly election : Parasgad
Party	Candidate	Votes	%	±%
JD	Chandrashekhar Mallikarjun Mamani	49,568	50.44	▲9.64
INC	S. S. Koujalagi	39,050	39.74	▼10.14
BJP	A. Y. Patil	2,957	3.01	New
INC	A. M. Hadimani	2,343	2.38	New
KRRS	V. V. Kalawad	2,182	2.22	New
Independent	S. R. Karadai	1,351	1.37	New
Margin of victory		10,518	10.70	▲1.62
Turnout		100,645	72.47	▼1.29
Total valid votes		98,267		
Rejected ballots		2,319	2.30	▼2.42
Registered electors		138,882		▲8.73
JD gain from INC		Swing	▲0.56	

=== Assembly Election 1989 ===
1989 Karnataka Legislative Assembly election : Parasgad
Party	Candidate	Votes	%	±%
INC	Koujalgi Subhash Siddramappa	44,777	49.88	▲10.65
JD	Chandrashekhar Mallikarjun Mamani	36,627	40.80	New
Kranti Sabha	Rajput Manasing Hirasing	7,861	8.76	New
Margin of victory		8,150	9.08	▼9.69
Turnout		94,218	73.76	▲1.45
Total valid votes		89,775		
Rejected ballots		4,443	4.72	▲2.78
Registered electors		127,733		▲27.83
INC gain from Independent		Swing	▼8.12	

=== Assembly Election 1985 ===
1985 Karnataka Legislative Assembly election : Parasgad
Party	Candidate	Votes	%	±%
Independent	Chandrashekhar Mallikarjun Mamani	41,095	58.00	New
INC	Ramanagouda Venkanagouda Patil	27,793	39.23	▼6.48
CPI(M)	Halakatti Venkaraddi Ningareddi	1,450	2.05	New
Independent	Bekanalkar Suresh	513	0.72	New
Margin of victory		13,302	18.77	▲15.40
Turnout		72,255	72.31	▲4.72
Total valid votes		70,851		
Rejected ballots		1,404	1.94	▼1.16
Registered electors		99,928		▲6.35
Independent gain from INC		Swing	▲12.29	

=== Assembly Election 1983 ===
1983 Karnataka Legislative Assembly election : Parasgad
Party	Candidate	Votes	%	±%
INC	Ramanagouda Venkanagouda Patil	28,126	45.71	▲41.04
JP	Nugganatti Yallappa Karabasappa	26,053	42.34	▲5.28
Independent	Patil Alias Kappannavar Shankarfouda Honagouda	1,847	3.00	New
Independent	Jambagi Dileep Yallappa	1,171	1.90	New
Independent	Renukegoudra Sureeshagouda Vishwanathgouda	1,040	1.69	New
Independent	Kabbur Basavaraj Adiveppa	952	1.55	New
Independent	Arabal Yallappa Hanamappa	724	1.18	New
Independent	Rajesab Moulasab Giddannavar	542	0.88	New
Independent	Hasalkar Subhas Maruteppa	476	0.77	New
Margin of victory		2,073	3.37	▲0.33
Turnout		63,504	67.59	▼4.75
Total valid votes		61,533		
Rejected ballots		1,971	3.10	▲0.16
Registered electors		93,958		▲12.68
INC gain from INC(I)		Swing	▲5.61	

=== Assembly Election 1978 ===
1978 Karnataka Legislative Assembly election : Parasgad
Party	Candidate	Votes	%	±%
INC(I)	Gudanshah Khanashah Takked	23,475	40.10	New
JP	Koujalgi Shivanand Hemappa	21,698	37.06	New
Independent	Chikaraddi Hanamappa Laxmappa	9,487	16.20	New
INC	Galabi Dundappa Gadigeppa	2,733	4.67	▼59.84
Independent	Kappanavar Shankargouda Honagoud	612	1.05	New
Independent	Govindaraddi Ramareddi Meti	540	0.92	New
Margin of victory		1,777	3.04	▼26.99
Turnout		60,319	72.34	▲1.67
Total valid votes		58,545		
Rejected ballots		1,774	2.94	▲2.94
Registered electors		83,385		▲15.74
INC(I) gain from INC		Swing	▼24.41	

=== Assembly Election 1972 ===
1972 Mysore State Legislative Assembly election : Parasgad
Party	Candidate	Votes	%	±%
INC	Padaki Shankarrao Bindurao	31,810	64.51	▲12.71
INC(O)	T. R. Patil	17,001	34.48	New
Independent	Y. B. Shantalingappa	497	1.01	New
Margin of victory		14,809	30.03	▲26.44
Turnout		50,910	70.67	▲1.04
Total valid votes		49,308		
Registered electors		72,043		▲12.16
INC hold		Swing	▲12.71	

=== Assembly Election 1967 ===
1967 Mysore State Legislative Assembly election : Parasgad
Party	Candidate	Votes	%	±%
INC	K. H. Veerabhadrappa	21,916	51.80	▼2.09
Independent	Padaki Shankarrao Bindurao	20,396	48.20	New
Margin of victory		1,520	3.59	▼4.18
Turnout		44,727	69.63	▲2.57
Total valid votes		42,312		
Registered electors		64,232		▲21.17
INC hold		Swing	▼2.09	

=== Assembly Election 1962 ===
1962 Mysore State Legislative Assembly election : Parasgad
Party	Candidate	Votes	%	±%
INC	Venkaraddi Shidaraddi Timmaraddi	17,811	53.89	▲6.58
Independent	Padaki Shankarrao Bindurao	15,242	46.11	New
Margin of victory		2,569	7.77	▲2.38
Turnout		35,549	67.06	▲3.14
Total valid votes		33,053		
Registered electors		53,010		▲9.71
INC gain from Independent		Swing	▲1.20	

=== Assembly Election 1957 ===
1957 Mysore State Legislative Assembly election : Parasgad
Party	Candidate	Votes	%	±%
Independent	Padaki Shankarrao Bindurao	16,274	52.69	New
INC	Kamat Pramila Shrirang	14,610	47.31	▼8.21
Margin of victory		1,664	5.39	▼5.65
Turnout		30,884	63.92	▲0.46
Total valid votes		30,884		
Registered electors		48,318		▼21.18
Independent gain from INC		Swing	▼2.83	

=== Assembly Election 1952 ===
1952 Bombay State Legislative Assembly election : Parasgad
Party	Candidate	Votes	%	±%
INC	Kaujalgi Hemappa Veerbhadrappa	21,599	55.52	New
KMPP	Patil Rayangouda Lingangouda	17,303	44.48	New
Margin of victory		4,296	11.04	
Turnout		38,902	63.46	
Total valid votes		38,902		
Registered electors		61,303		
INC win (new seat)				

== See also ==
- List of constituencies of Karnataka Legislative Assembly
