= Kalgi Assembly constituency =

Former Assembly constituency in Karnataka, India

Coordinates: 17.354827°N 77.154110°E

Kalgi
- Former constituency for the State Legislative Assembly

Constituency details
- Country: India
- State: Mysore State
- Division: Kalaburagi
- District: Kalaburagi
- Lok Sabha constituency: Gulbarga
- Established: 1957
- Abolished: 1978

Kalgi Assembly constituency was one of the constituencies in Mysore state assembly in India until 1978 when it was made defunct. It was part of Gulbarga Lok Sabha constituency.

== Members of the Legislative Assembly ==
Election	Member	Party
1957	Shankarshetti Rachappa	Indian National Congress
1962	S. Rudrappa	Indian National Congress
1967	K. R. Mallappa	Indian National Congress
1972	Prabhaker Telker	Indian National Congress

== Election results ==
=== Assembly Election 1972 ===
1972 Mysore State Legislative Assembly election : Kalgi
Party	Candidate	Votes	%	±%
INC	Prabhaker Telker	14,707	50.28%	▼26.18
INC(O)	Shivalingappa	12,485	42.68%	New
SWA	Shyamsunder Rao	2,061	7.05%	▼12.48
Margin of victory		2,222	7.60%	▼49.33
Turnout		30,498	41.80%	▲4.52
Total valid votes		29,253		
Registered electors		72,961		▲17.73
INC hold		Swing	▼26.18	

=== Assembly Election 1967 ===
1967 Mysore State Legislative Assembly election : Kalgi
Party	Candidate	Votes	%	±%
INC	K. R. Mallappa	16,533	76.46%	▲15.97
SWA	A. Rao	4,223	19.53%	▼2.02
SSP	V. Channamallappa	866	4.01%	New
Margin of victory		12,310	56.93%	▲17.99
Turnout		23,106	37.28%	▼0.71
Total valid votes		21,622		
Registered electors		61,972		▲26.00
INC hold		Swing	▲15.97	

=== Assembly Election 1962 ===
1962 Mysore State Legislative Assembly election : Kalgi
Party	Candidate	Votes	%	±%
INC	S. Rudrappa	10,608	60.49%	▼2.46
SWA	Sharangowda Siddaramayya	3,779	21.55%	New
CPI	Abdul Kareem	2,285	13.03%	▼15.02
Independent	David Rao	866	4.94%	New
Margin of victory		6,829	38.94%	▲4.04
Turnout		18,683	37.99%	▲7.17
Total valid votes		17,538		
Registered electors		49,184		▲5.52
INC hold		Swing	▼2.46	

=== Assembly Election 1957 ===
1957 Mysore State Legislative Assembly election : Kalgi
Party	Candidate	Votes	%	±%
INC	Shankarshetti Rachappa	9,044	62.95%	New
CPI	Gulam Nabi Azad Shaik Dawood	4,030	28.05%	New
Independent	Iranna Chabnmallappa	1,292	8.99%	New
Margin of victory		5,014	34.90%	
Turnout		14,366	30.82%	
Total valid votes		14,366		
Registered electors		46,611		
INC win (new seat)				

== See also ==
- List of constituencies of the Mysore Legislative Assembly
