= Gokak I Assembly constituency =

Former constituency in Karnataka, India

Coordinates: 16.164942°N 74.823850°E

Gokak I
- Former constituency for the State Legislative Assembly

Constituency details
- Country: India
- State: Mysore State
- District: Belagavi
- Lok Sabha constituency: Belagavi
- Established: 1957
- Abolished: 1967
- Reservation: None

Gokak I Assembly constituency was one of the constituencies in the state assembly of Mysore, in India. It was part of Belagavi Lok Sabha constituency, which is adjacent to Chikkodi Lok Sabha constituency.

== Members of the Legislative Assembly ==
Election	Member	Party
1957	Ningappa Appayya Karlingan Navar	Indian National Congress
1962	Ningappa Appayya Karlingan Navar	Indian National Congress

== Election results ==
=== Assembly Election 1962 ===
1962 Mysore State Legislative Assembly election : Gokak I
Party	Candidate	Votes	%	±%
INC	Ningappa Appayya Karlingan Navar	19,245	69.70%	▼5.20
Independent	Shivangouda Mallangouda Patil	8,366	30.30%	New
Margin of victory		10,879	39.40%	▼10.39
Turnout		29,355	56.69%	▼3.58
Total valid votes		27,611		
Registered electors		51,786		▲20.60
INC hold		Swing	▼5.20	

=== Assembly Election 1957 ===
1957 Mysore State Legislative Assembly election : Gokak I
Party	Candidate	Votes	%	±%
INC	Ningappa Appayya Karlingan Navar	19,384	74.90%	New
ABJS	Hidkal Gangadhar Ramappa	6,497	25.10%	New
Margin of victory		12,887	49.79%	
Turnout		25,881	60.27%	
Total valid votes		25,881		
Registered electors		42,940		
INC win (new seat)				
