= Chandrashekarapura Assembly constituency =

Former Assembly constituency in Karnataka, India

Coordinates: 13.150157°N 76.883505°E

Chandrasekharapura
- Former constituency for the State Legislative Assembly

Constituency details
- Country: India
- State: Mysore state
- Division: Bangalore
- District: Tumkur
- Lok Sabha constituency: Tumkur
- Established: 1957
- Abolished: 1967

Chandrasekharapura Assembly constituency Vidhan Sabha seat was one of the constituencies in Mysore state assembly in India until 1967 when it was made defunct. It was part of Tumkur Lok Sabha constituency.

== Members of the Legislative Assembly ==
Election	Member	Party
1957	N. Huchamasthy Gowda	Indian National Congress
1962	N. Huchamasthy Gowda	Indian National Congress

== Election results ==
=== Assembly Election 1962 ===
1962 Mysore State Legislative Assembly election : Chandrashekarapura
Party	Candidate	Votes	%	±%
INC	N. Huchamasthy Gowda	14,012	37.28%	▼0.71
Independent	G. Thammanna	13,138	34.95%	New
PSP	B. G. Bhagavan	10,440	27.77%	▲5.83
Margin of victory		874	2.33%	▼11.85
Turnout		39,946	71.80%	▲18.65
Total valid votes		37,590		
Registered electors		55,633		▲18.51
INC hold		Swing	▼0.71	

=== Assembly Election 1957 ===
1957 Mysore State Legislative Assembly election : Chandrashekarapura
Party	Candidate	Votes	%	±%
INC	N. Huchamasthy Gowda	9,478	37.99%	New
Independent	G. Thammanna	5,940	23.81%	New
PSP	B. G. Bhagavan	5,474	21.94%	New
Independent	Patel Karigowda	4,056	16.26%	New
Margin of victory		3,538	14.18%	
Turnout		24,948	53.15%	
Total valid votes		24,948		
Registered electors		46,943		
INC win (new seat)				

== See also ==
- List of constituencies of the Mysore Legislative Assembly
