= Gandasi Assembly constituency =

Former Assembly constituency in Karnataka, India

Coordinates: 13.158576°N 76.306465°E

Gandasi
- Former constituency No. 131 for the Karnataka Legislative Assembly

Constituency details
- Country: India
- Region: South India
- State: Karnataka
- Division: Mysore
- District: Hassan
- Lok Sabha constituency: Hassan
- Established: 1957
- Abolished: 2008
- Reservation: None

Gandasi Assembly constituency was one of the constituencies in Karnataka state assembly in India until 2008 when it was made defunct. It was part of Hassan Lok Sabha constituency.

== Members of the Legislative Assembly ==
Election	Member	Party
1957	Dyavamma Manjappa	Indian National Congress
1962	H. R. Keshava Murthy	Praja Socialist Party
1967	B. Nanjappa	Indian National Congress
1972	M. Nanje Gowda	Indian National Congress
1978	Haranahalli Ramaswamy	Indian National Congress
1983	B. Nanjappa	Janata Party
1985	E. Nanje Gowda	Janata Party
1989	B. Shivaramu	Indian National Congress
1994	B. Shivaramu	Independent politician
1999	B. Shivaramu	Indian National Congress
2004	B. Shivaramu	Indian National Congress

== Election results ==
=== Assembly Election 2004 ===
2004 Karnataka Legislative Assembly election : Gandasi
Party	Candidate	Votes	%	±%
INC	B. Shivaramu	52,781	46.95%	▼15.41
JD(S)	K. M. Shivalinge Gowda	52,763	46.94%	▲25.54
BJP	Nanjegowda. E	4,650	4.14%	New
Kannada Nadu Party	Chandrashekar. N. C	2,218	1.97%	New
Margin of victory		18	0.02%	▼40.94
Turnout		112,528	77.93%	▲1.59
Total valid votes		112,412		
Registered electors		144,391		▲5.13
INC hold		Swing	▼15.41	

=== Assembly Election 1999 ===
1999 Karnataka Legislative Assembly election : Gandasi
Party	Candidate	Votes	%	±%
INC	B. Shivaramu	62,530	62.36%	New
JD(S)	Rajeshakarappa	21,455	21.40%	New
JD(U)	E. Nanje Gowda	14,312	14.27%	New
Independent	N. Shivaswamy	1,976	1.97%	New
Margin of victory		41,075	40.96%	▲30.30
Turnout		104,850	76.34%	▼2.86
Total valid votes		100,273		
Rejected ballots		4,557	4.35%	▲2.77
Registered electors		137,339		▲4.38
INC gain from Independent		Swing	▲10.66	

=== Assembly Election 1994 ===
1994 Karnataka Legislative Assembly election : Gandasi
Party	Candidate	Votes	%	±%
Independent	B. Shivaramu	53,002	51.70%	New
JD	E. Nanje Gowda	42,070	41.04%	▲15.18
BJP	G. R. Gopi Nath	5,605	5.47%	New
INC	G. M. Manjunatha	968	0.94%	New
Margin of victory		10,932	10.66%	▼19.95
Turnout		104,200	79.20%	▲3.96
Total valid votes		102,510		
Rejected ballots		1,647	1.58%	▼3.38
Registered electors		131,573		▲12.37
Independent gain from INC		Swing	▼4.77	

=== Assembly Election 1989 ===
1989 Karnataka Legislative Assembly election : Gandasi
Party	Candidate	Votes	%	±%
INC	B. Shivaramu	47,281	56.47%	▲22.48
JD	E. Nanje Gowda	21,654	25.86%	New
JP	Nanjunde Gowda	13,143	15.70%	New
Independent	Hanumanthe Gowda	1,067	1.27%	New
Independent	G. R. Rudranamma	577	0.69%	New
Margin of victory		25,627	30.61%	▲0.64
Turnout		88,093	75.24%	▲3.43
Total valid votes		83,722		
Rejected ballots		4,371	4.96%	▲3.28
Registered electors		117,085		▲30.29
INC gain from JP		Swing	▼7.49	

=== Assembly Election 1985 ===
1985 Karnataka Legislative Assembly election : Gandasi
Party	Candidate	Votes	%	±%
JP	E. Nanje Gowda	40,581	63.96%	▲10.35
INC	Jayalakshmi Rajannagowda	21,566	33.99%	▲3.02
Independent	Puttaiah	405	0.64%	New
Margin of victory		19,015	29.97%	▲7.33
Turnout		64,530	71.81%	▼1.30
Total valid votes		63,449		
Rejected ballots		1,081	1.68%	▼0.40
Registered electors		89,862		▲6.33
JP hold		Swing	▲10.35	

=== Assembly Election 1983 ===
1983 Karnataka Legislative Assembly election : Gandasi
Party	Candidate	Votes	%	±%
JP	B. Nanjappa	32,433	53.61%	▲14.12
INC	Haranahalli Ramaswamy	18,736	30.97%	▲27.11
Independent	Deshani Basavaraju	7,760	12.83%	New
Independent	Panchaksharaiah	632	1.04%	New
Independent	M. B. Channabasappa	519	0.86%	New
Margin of victory		13,697	22.64%	▲19.21
Turnout		61,783	73.11%	▲0.47
Total valid votes		60,498		
Rejected ballots		1,285	2.08%	▼0.86
Registered electors		84,511		▲9.53
JP gain from INC(I)		Swing	▲10.69	

=== Assembly Election 1978 ===
1978 Karnataka Legislative Assembly election : Gandasi
Party	Candidate	Votes	%	±%
INC(I)	Haranahalli Ramaswamy	23,352	42.92%	New
JP	B. Nanjappa	21,484	39.49%	New
Independent	E. Nanje Gowda	7,236	13.30%	New
INC	M. Nanje Gowda	2,101	3.86%	▼34.92
Margin of victory		1,868	3.43%	▼11.87
Turnout		56,052	72.64%	▲13.66
Total valid votes		54,404		
Rejected ballots		1,648	2.94%	▲2.94
Registered electors		77,161		▲17.86
INC(I) gain from INC		Swing	▲4.14	

=== Assembly Election 1972 ===
1972 Mysore State Legislative Assembly election : Gandasi
Party	Candidate	Votes	%	±%
INC	M. Nanje Gowda	14,502	38.78%	▼4.32
Independent	B. Nanjappa	8,781	23.48%	New
ABJS	D. T. Basavaraju	8,441	22.57%	New
SWA	Rangaswamy	2,878	7.70%	New
INC(O)	Dyavamma Manjappa	2,792	7.47%	New
Margin of victory		5,721	15.30%	▲10.43
Turnout		38,616	58.98%	▲1.84
Total valid votes		37,394		
Registered electors		65,468		▲14.35
INC hold		Swing	▼4.32	

=== Assembly Election 1967 ===
1967 Mysore State Legislative Assembly election : Gandasi
Party	Candidate	Votes	%	±%
INC	B. Nanjappa	12,971	43.10%	▲13.60
PSP	H. R. Keshava Murthy	11,505	38.23%	▲2.21
Independent	S. K. S. S. Gowda	5,616	18.66%	New
Margin of victory		1,466	4.87%	▲3.33
Turnout		32,716	57.14%	▲14.21
Total valid votes		30,092		
Registered electors		57,253		▼6.11
INC gain from PSP		Swing	▲7.08	

=== Assembly Election 1962 ===
1962 Mysore State Legislative Assembly election : Gandasi
Party	Candidate	Votes	%	±%
PSP	H. R. Keshava Murthy	8,637	36.02%	New
SWA	Chikkegowda	8,267	34.48%	New
INC	Dyavamma Manjappa	7,074	29.50%	▼4.88
Margin of victory		370	1.54%	▼5.19
Turnout		26,180	42.93%	▼3.14
Total valid votes		23,978		
Registered electors		60,978		▲15.15
PSP gain from INC		Swing	▲1.64	

=== Assembly Election 1957 ===
1957 Mysore State Legislative Assembly election : Gandasi
Party	Candidate	Votes	%	±%
INC	Dyavamma Manjappa	8,388	34.38%	New
Independent	H. R. Keshava Murthy	6,746	27.65%	New
Independent	Chickegowda	6,097	24.99%	New
Independent	B. Gangappa	3,168	12.98%	New
Margin of victory		1,642	6.73%	
Turnout		24,399	46.07%	
Total valid votes		24,399		
Registered electors		52,955		
INC win (new seat)				

== See also ==
- List of constituencies of the Karnataka Legislative Assembly
