= Santpur Assembly constituency =

Former Assembly constituency in Karnataka, India

Coordinates: 18.1611867°N 77.4396460°E

Santpur
- Former constituency No. 1 for the State Legislative Assembly

Constituency details
- Country: India
- State: Mysore State
- Division: Kalaburagi
- District: Bidar
- Lok Sabha constituency: Bidar
- Established: 1962
- Abolished: 1967
- Reservation: SC

Santpur Assembly constituency was one of the constituencies in Mysore state assembly in India until 1978 when it was made defunct. It was part of Bidar Lok Sabha constituency.

== Members of the Legislative Assembly ==
Election	Member	Party
1962	Prabhoo Rao Dhondiba	Indian National Congress

== Election results ==
=== Assembly Election 1962 ===
1962 Mysore State Legislative Assembly election : Santpur
Party	Candidate	Votes	%	±%
INC	Prabhoo Rao Dhondiba	9,098	47.82%	New
RPI	G. Vithal Rao Kamble	7,893	41.49%	New
PSP	B. Shamsunder	2,034	10.69%	New
Margin of victory		1,205	6.33%	
Turnout		20,169	34.96%	
Total valid votes		19,025		
Registered electors		57,685		
INC win (new seat)				

== See also ==
- List of constituencies of the Mysore Legislative Assembly
