= Robertsonpet Assembly constituency =

Former Assembly constituency in Karnataka, India

Coordinates: 12.961012°N 78.258923°E

Robertsonpet
- Former constituency for the State Legislative Assembly

Constituency details
- Country: India
- State: Mysore State
- Division: Bangalore
- District: Kolar
- Lok Sabha constituency: Kolar
- Established: 1962
- Abolished: 1967

Robertsonpet Assembly constituency was one of the constituencies in Mysore state assembly in India until 1967 when it was made defunct. It was part of Kolar Lok Sabha constituency.

== Members of the Legislative Assembly ==
Election	Member	Party
1962	D. Venkata Ramiah	Indian National Congress

== Election results ==
=== Assembly Election 1962 ===
1962 Mysore State Legislative Assembly election : Robertsonpet
Party	Candidate	Votes	%	±%
INC	D. Venkata Ramiah	14,536	69.73%	New
CPI	V. M. Govindan	2,935	14.08%	New
RPI	Syed Nazeer Ahmed	2,534	12.16%	New
Independent	G. Pillapa	841	4.03%	New
Margin of victory		11,601	55.65%	
Turnout		22,205	60.81%	
Total valid votes		20,846		
Registered electors		36,518		
INC win (new seat)				

== See also ==
- List of constituencies of the Mysore Legislative Assembly
