= Mysore Taluk Assembly constituency =

Former Assembly constituency in Karnataka, India

Coordinates: 12.291533°N 76.6428°E

Mysore Taluk
- Former constituency for the State Legislative Assembly

Constituency details
- Country: India
- State: Mysore State
- Division: Mysore
- District: Mysore
- Lok Sabha constituency: Mysore
- Established: 1951
- Abolished: 1967
- Reservation: None

Mysore Taluk or Mysore Assembly constituency was one of the Karnataka Legislative Assemblies or Vidhan Sabha constituencies in Mysore State. It was part of Mysore Lok Sabha constituency.

== Members of the Legislative Assembly ==
Election	Member	Party
1952	Shivananje Gowda	Indian National Congress
1957	Kalastavadi Puttaswamy	Indian National Congress
1962	Kalastavadi Puttaswamy	Indian National Congress

== Election results ==
=== Assembly Election 1962 ===
1962 Mysore State Legislative Assembly election : Mysore
Party	Candidate	Votes	%	±%
INC	Kalastavadi Puttaswamy	17,946	56.13%	▲1.89
PSP	T. V. Srinivasa Rao	7,191	22.49%	▼4.07
Independent	H. D. Shivalinge Gowda	3,433	10.74%	New
CPI	M. Chikathammiah	3,403	10.64%	New
Margin of victory		10,755	33.64%	▲5.96
Turnout		34,131	58.73%	▲13.94
Total valid votes		31,973		
Registered electors		58,116		▲20.13
INC hold		Swing	▲1.89	

=== Assembly Election 1957 ===
1957 Mysore State Legislative Assembly election : Mysore
Party	Candidate	Votes	%	±%
INC	Kalastavadi Puttaswamy	11,753	54.24%	▲21.36
PSP	V. Srikantappa	5,755	26.56%	New
Independent	T. C. Honnappa	4,160	19.20%	New
Margin of victory		5,998	27.68%	▲13.49
Turnout		21,668	44.79%	▲7.83
Total valid votes		21,668		
Registered electors		48,377		▲20.37
INC hold		Swing	▲21.36	

=== Assembly Election 1952 ===
1952 Mysore State Legislative Assembly election : Mysore Taluk
Party	Candidate	Votes	%	±%
INC	Shivananje Gowda	4,883	32.88%	New
Independent	M. C. Mahadeva Swamy	2,776	18.69%	New
KMPP	T. C. Honnappa	2,460	16.56%	New
Independent	H. K. Kumaraswamy	2,433	16.38%	New
Independent	K. Siddiah	1,859	12.52%	New
ABJS	M. S. Basavanna	442	2.98%	New
Margin of victory		2,107	14.19%	
Turnout		14,853	36.96%	
Total valid votes		14,853		
Registered electors		40,189		
INC win (new seat)				

== See also ==
- Mysore City South Assembly constituency
- Mysore City North Assembly constituency
- Chamundeshwari Assembly constituency
