= Mysore City North Assembly constituency =

Former Assembly constituency in Karnataka, India

Coordinates: 12.330761°N 76.642846°E

Mysore City North
- Former constituency for the State Legislative Assembly

Constituency details
- Country: India
- State: Mysore State
- Division: Mysore
- District: Mysore
- Lok Sabha constituency: Mysore
- Established: 1951
- Abolished: 1967
- Reservation: None

Mysore City North Assembly constituency was one of the Karnataka Legislative Assemblies or Vidhan Sabha constituencies in Mysore State. It was part of Mysore Lok Sabha constituency.

== Members of the Legislative Assembly ==
Election	Member	Party
1952	T. Mariappa	Indian National Congress
1957	A. Mohammad Sait	Independent politician
1962	B. K. Puttaiah	Praja Socialist Party

== Election results ==
=== Assembly Election 1962 ===
1962 Mysore State Legislative Assembly election : Mysore City North
Party	Candidate	Votes	%	±%
PSP	B. K. Puttaiah	8,546	36.59%	▲17.72
INC	M. J. Mohamad Yakub	5,018	21.49%	▼13.57
Independent	A. Mohammad Sait	3,668	15.71%	New
Independent	Abdul Jabbar Khan	2,336	10.00%	New
ABJS	J. Kamalaraman	2,038	8.73%	New
SWA	A. M. Mohamad Budan	1,171	5.01%	New
Independent	Puttathayamma	295	1.26%	New
Independent	T. V. Krishnamurthy	215	0.92%	New
Margin of victory		3,528	15.11%	▲14.01
Turnout		24,395	55.58%	▲2.00
Total valid votes		23,353		
Registered electors		43,889		▲14.94
PSP gain from Independent		Swing	▲0.42	

=== Assembly Election 1957 ===
1957 Mysore State Legislative Assembly election : Mysore City North
Party	Candidate	Votes	%	±%
Independent	A. Mohammad Sait	7,400	36.17%	New
INC	Ahmad Ali Khan	7,174	35.06%	▼16.18
PSP	B. K. Puttaiah	3,860	18.87%	New
Independent	A. Ramanna	1,256	6.14%	New
CPI	M. N. Ugrappa	771	3.77%	New
Margin of victory		226	1.10%	▼14.89
Turnout		20,461	53.58%	▼0.68
Total valid votes		20,461		
Registered electors		38,185		▼13.74
Independent gain from INC		Swing	▼15.07	

=== Assembly Election 1952 ===
1952 Mysore State Legislative Assembly election : Mysore City North
Party	Candidate	Votes	%	±%
INC	T. Mariappa	12,307	51.24%	New
Independent	Mohammad Sheriff	8,466	35.25%	New
Independent	E. P. Nanjappa	1,515	6.31%	New
Socialist Party (India)	Mir Noor Hussain	1,100	4.58%	New
ABJS	Chandrasekhara Jois	632	2.63%	New
Margin of victory		3,841	15.99%	
Turnout		24,020	54.26%	
Total valid votes		24,020		
Registered electors		44,265		
INC win (new seat)				

== See also ==
- Mysore City South Assembly constituency
- Mysore Taluk Assembly constituency
- Narasimharaja Assembly constituency
