= Sampagaon II Assembly constituency =

Former constituency in Karnataka, India

Coordinates: 15.813525°N 74.841113°E

Sampagaon II
- Former constituency for the State Legislative Assembly

Constituency details
- Country: India
- State: Mysore State
- District: Belagavi
- Lok Sabha constituency: Belagavi
- Established: 1957
- Abolished: 1967
- Reservation: None

Sampagaon II Assembly constituency was one of the Vidhan Sabha constituencies in the state assembly of Mysore, in India. It was part of Belagavi Lok Sabha constituency, which is adjacent to Uttara Kannada Lok Sabha constituency.

== Members of the Legislative Assembly ==
Election	Member	Party
1957	Nagnur Mugatsab Nabisab	Indian National Congress
1962	Nagnur Mugatsab Nabisab	Indian National Congress

== Election results ==
=== Assembly Election 1962 ===
1962 Mysore State Legislative Assembly election : Sampagaon II
Party	Candidate	Votes	%	±%
INC	Nagnur Mugatsab Nabisab	21,856	57.79%	New
Independent	Parwatgouda Basangouda Patil	14,592	38.58%	New
Independent	Devengouda Kallangouda Patil	764	2.02%	New
SWA	Rachappa Mahantappa Sangoji	466	1.23%	New
Margin of victory		7,264	19.21%	
Turnout		39,282	78.68%	
Total valid votes		37,821		
Registered electors		49,924		
INC hold		Swing		

=== Assembly Election 1957 ===
1957 Mysore State Legislative Assembly election : Sampagaon II
Party	Candidate	Votes	%	±%
INC	Nagnur Mugatsab Nabisab	Unopposed		
Registered electors		46,910		
INC win (new seat)				
