= Mysore City South Assembly constituency =

Former Assembly constituency in Karnataka, India

Coordinates: 12.291533°N 76.6428°E

Mysore City South
- Former constituency for the State Legislative Assembly

Constituency details
- Country: India
- State: Mysore State
- Division: Mysore
- District: Mysore
- Lok Sabha constituency: Mysore
- Established: 1951
- Abolished: 1967
- Reservation: None

Mysore City South Assembly constituency was one of the Karnataka Legislative Assemblies or Vidhan Sabha constituencies in Mysore State. It was part of Mysore Lok Sabha constituency.

== Members of the Legislative Assembly ==
Election	Member	Party
1952	B. Narayanaswamy	Indian National Congress
1957	K. S. Suryanarayana Rao	Indian National Congress
1962	K. S. Suryanarayana Rao	Indian National Congress

== Election results ==
=== Assembly Election 1962 ===
1962 Mysore State Legislative Assembly election : Mysore City
Party	Candidate	Votes	%	±%
INC	K. S. Suryanarayana Rao	7,571	31.52%	▼4.90
Socialist Party (India)	Srikantasharma	4,007	16.68%	New
CPI	B. A. Belliapa	3,723	15.50%	New
ABJS	J. S. Raman	3,573	14.87%	New
SWA	N. S. Narayana Rao	2,541	10.58%	New
PSP	Venkamma Palahally Sitaramaiah	1,124	4.68%	▼4.21
Independent	A. Renuk	895	3.73%	New
Independent	N. G. Kambaiya	325	1.35%	New
Independent	H. N. Narasimha Murthy	264	1.10%	New
Margin of victory		3,564	14.84%	▲6.24
Turnout		25,392	53.46%	▲2.67
Total valid votes		24,023		
Registered electors		47,493		▲19.28
INC hold		Swing	▼4.90	

=== Assembly Election 1957 ===
1957 Mysore State Legislative Assembly election : Mysore City
Party	Candidate	Votes	%	±%
INC	K. S. Suryanarayana Rao	7,366	36.42%	▲5.82
Independent	L. Srikanthiah	5,626	27.82%	New
Independent	M. C. Mahadevaswamy	2,532	12.52%	New
PSP	Vedanta Hemmige	1,799	8.89%	New
Independent	Srikantasharma	1,699	8.40%	New
Independent	B. K. Vishwanath	1,203	5.95%	New
Margin of victory		1,740	8.60%	▼4.55
Turnout		20,225	50.79%	▲4.44
Total valid votes		20,225		
Registered electors		39,818		▼11.65
INC hold		Swing	▲5.82	

=== Assembly Election 1952 ===
1952 Mysore State Legislative Assembly election : Mysore City South
Party	Candidate	Votes	%	±%
INC	B. Narayanaswamy	6,391	30.60%	New
Independent	Raghavaraju	3,645	17.45%	New
KMPP	A. Venkatesiah	2,729	13.06%	New
SCF	G. S. Ramakrishnaiah	2,609	12.49%	New
Independent	B. G. Das	1,681	8.05%	New
ABJS	Rao Bahadur. M. Ramaswamy	1,348	6.45%	New
Socialist Party (India)	B. Sreekantappa	1,146	5.49%	New
Independent	S. Rangaramiah	993	4.75%	New
Independent	T. Narayana	347	1.66%	New
Margin of victory		2,746	13.15%	
Turnout		20,889	46.35%	
Total valid votes		20,889		
Registered electors		45,068		
INC win (new seat)				

== See also ==
- Mysore City North Assembly constituency
- Mysore Taluk Assembly constituency
- Krishnaraja Assembly constituency
