= Sampagaon I Assembly constituency =

Former constituency in Karnataka, India

Coordinates: 15.595333°N 74.781479°E

Sampagaon I
- Former constituency for the State Legislative Assembly

Constituency details
- Country: India
- State: Mysore State
- District: Belagavi
- Lok Sabha constituency: Uttara Kannada
- Established: 1957
- Abolished: 1967
- Reservation: None

Sampagaon I Assembly constituency was one of the Vidhan Sabha constituencies in the state assembly of Mysore, in India. It was part of Uttara Kannada Lok Sabha constituency, which is adjacent to Belagavi Lok Sabha constituency.

== Members of the Legislative Assembly ==
Election	Member	Party
1957	Joujalgi Hemappa Virabhadrappa	Indian National Congress
1962	Kallur Alias Wali Chanappa Shankarappa	Indian National Congress

== Election results ==
=== Assembly Election 1962 ===
1962 Mysore State Legislative Assembly election : Sampagaon I
Party	Candidate	Votes	%	±%
INC	Kallur Alias Wali Chanappa Shankarappa	19,370	66.71%	▼4.98
PSP	Basavaraj Gurunaik Naik	9,665	33.29%	▲4.98
Margin of victory		9,705	33.43%	▼9.95
Turnout		30,922	60.79%	▼3.18
Total valid votes		29,035		
Registered electors		50,869		▲8.70
INC hold		Swing	▼4.98	

=== Assembly Election 1957 ===
1957 Mysore State Legislative Assembly election : Sampagaon I
Party	Candidate	Votes	%	±%
INC	Joujalgi Hemappa Virabhadrappa	21,461	71.69%	New
PSP	Hosur Madivalappa Lingappa	8,474	28.31%	New
Margin of victory		12,987	43.38%	
Turnout		29,935	63.97%	
Total valid votes		29,935		
Registered electors		46,798		
INC win (new seat)				
