= Grace Tucker =

Indian politician

Member of the Legislative Assembly
- In office 1957–1967
- Constituency: Halasuru

Deputy Minister of Education
- In office 1957–1967
- Chief Minister: S. Nijalingappa

Personal details
- Citizenship: India
- Party: Indian National Congress

Grace Tucker was an Indian politician and a former Congress MLA in Mysore State who represented Halasuru from 1957 to 1967. She was the first woman to get a cabinet post in Karnataka, serving as the Deputy Minister of Education during the Nijalingappa ministry. As the Deputy Minister of Education, she was involved with the Kothari Commission.

== Biography ==
Grace Tucker was the second principal of Jyoti Nivas College. She served on the Board of Management and as the former Headmistress of C.E.Z.M. English Primary School. On 20 October 1963, she inaugurated the Wilcox Block at Clarence High School.
