= Belagavi division =

Coordinates: 15.85°N 74.5°E

Belagavi division Belgaum division
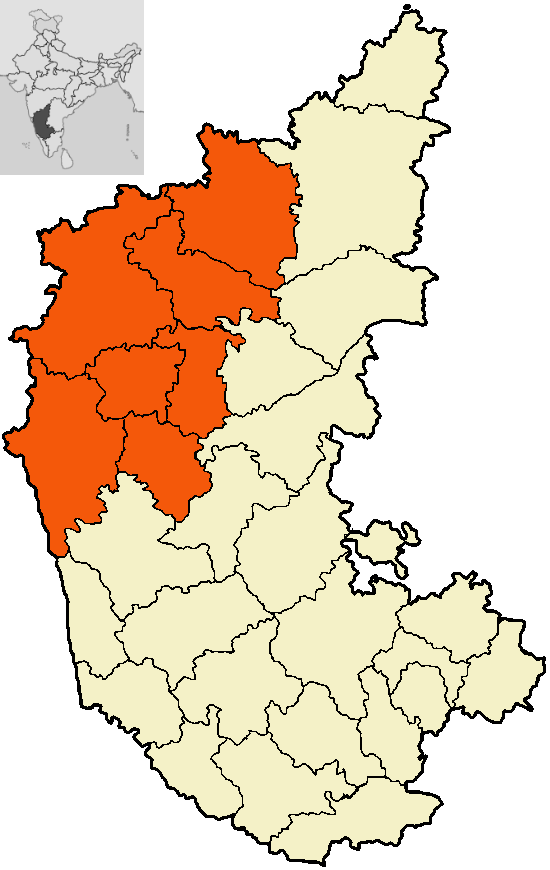
- Belagavi division
- Country: India
- State: Karnataka
- Region: Malenadu; Karavali; Bayalu Seeme
- Headquarters: Belagavi
- District: Belagavi; Uttara Kannada; Haveri; Bagalkot; Bijapur; Dharwad; Gadag

Government
  - Type: Divisional Administration
  - Body: Belagavi Divisional Commissioner

Area
  - Total: 44,538 km^{2} (17,196 sq mi)
  - Rank: 2

Population (2011)
  - Total: 13,499,721
  - Rank: 2
  - Density: 303.11/km^{2} (785.04/sq mi)

Languages
  - Official: Kannada
- Time zone: UTC+5:30 (IST)
- Website: www.karnataka.gov.in/english

Belagavi division, formerly Belgaum division, is one of the four divisions of Indian state of Karnataka. The region is also called as Kitturu Karnataka. The division comprises the districts of Bagalkot, Belgavi, Bijapur, Dharwad, Gadag, Haveri and Uttara Kannada. It covers a geographical area of 44,538 square kilometres (17,196 sq mi) and had a population of 13,499,721 at the 2011 census. The population density of the division was 239 per square kilometre (620/sq mi).

== See also ==
- Sirsi
- North Western Karnataka Road Transport Corporation
- North Karnataka
