= List of constituencies of the Karnataka Legislative Assembly =

Karnataka Legislative Assembly
- 16th Legislative Assembly of Karnataka

Type
- Type: Lower house of Karnataka Legislature
- Term limits: 5 years

Elections
- Voting system: First past the post
- Last election: 10 May 2023
- Next election: May 2028

Meeting place
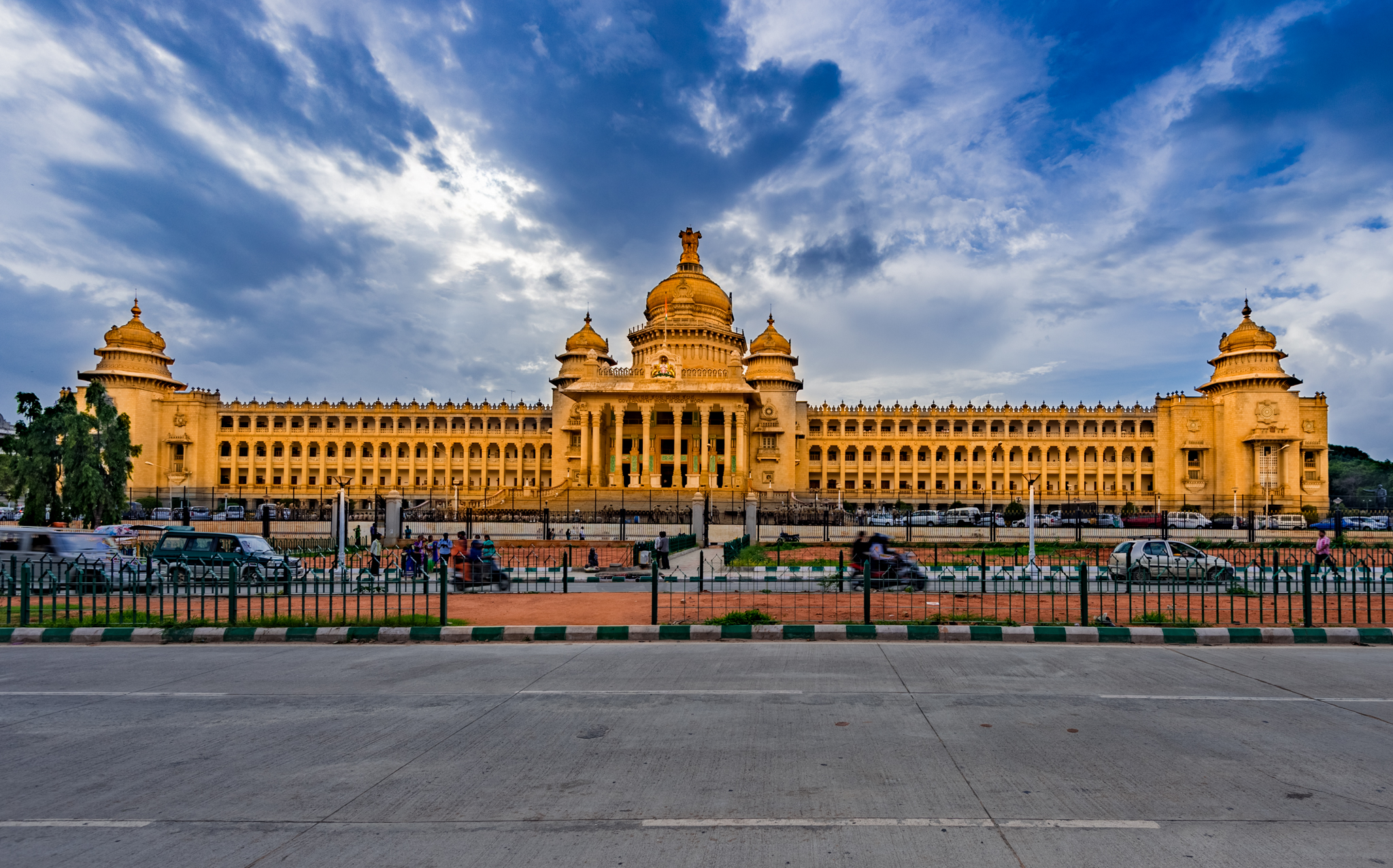
- Legislative Assembly building, Vidhana Soudha, Bangalore, Karnataka, India.
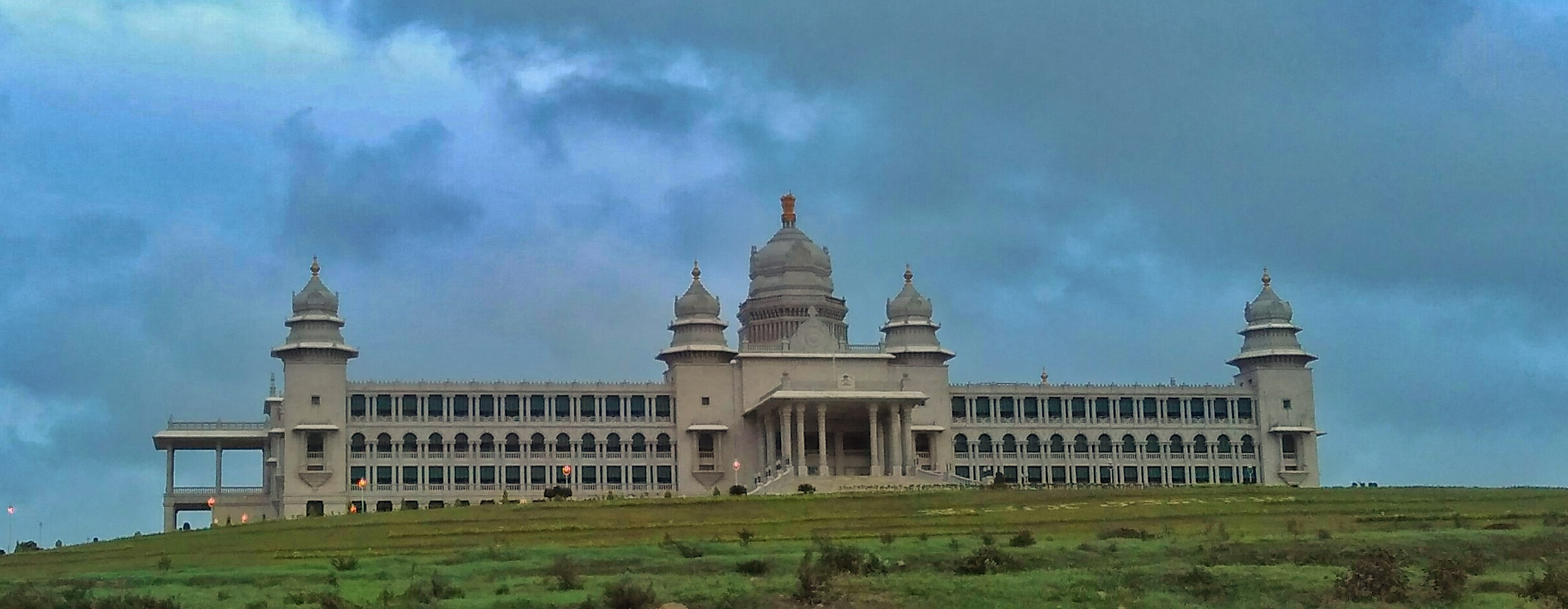
- Legislative Assembly building, Suvarna Vidhana Soudha, Belagavi, Karnataka, India (Winter session)

Website
- Karnataka Legislative Assembly

Footnotes
- The Council was established in 1881 for the Princely State of Mysore. The princely state was merged with the Dominion of India and became Mysore State in 1947; Mysore State was re-organized to its current territorial state in 1956 and renamed as Karnataka on 1 November 1973.

The Karnataka Legislative Assembly is the lower house of the bicameral legislature of Karnataka state in India. Karnataka is one of the six states in India, where the state legislature is bicameral, comprising two houses. The two houses are the Vidhan Sabha (lower house) and the Vidhan Parishad (upper house).

In summer, the seat of the Legislative Assembly is in Bangalore, the capital of the state, while in winter it is at Belagavi, in the northern part of the state. The term of the Legislative Assembly is five years, unless dissolved earlier. Presently, it comprises 224 members who are directly elected from single-seat constituencies.

Since the independence of India, the Scheduled Castes (SC) and Scheduled Tribes (ST) have been given Reservation status, guaranteeing political representation, and the Constitution lays down the general principles of positive discrimination for SCs and STs. The 2011 census of India stated that indigenous people constitute 7% of the state's total population, while people from the Scheduled Castes constitute 17.5% of the total population. Accordingly, the Scheduled Tribes have been granted a reservation of 15 seats in the assembly, while 36 constituencies are reserved for candidates of the Scheduled Castes.

== Current constituencies ==
Map of Karnataka Legislative Assembly constituencies

Assembly seats by Lok Sabha constituencies and districts, 2010

Assembly seats by Lok Sabha constituencies and districts, 2007

The following is a list of the constituencies of the Karnataka Legislative Assembly since the delimitation of legislative assembly constituencies in 2008.

#	Name	District	Lok Sabha constituency	Voters / electors	Map
1	Nippani	Belagavi	Chikkodi	2,26,662	
2	Chikkodi-Sadalga	Belagavi	Chikkodi	2,24,693	
3	Athani	Belagavi	Chikkodi	2,29,195	
4	Kagwad	Belagavi	Chikkodi	1,95,985	
5	Kudachi (SC)	Belagavi	Chikkodi	1,93,564	
6	Raibag (SC)	Belagavi	Chikkodi	2,11,461	
7	Hukkeri	Belagavi	Chikkodi	2,08,204	
8	Arabhavi	Belagavi	Belgaum	2,48,632	
9	Gokak	Belagavi	Belgaum	2,56,471	
10	Yemkanmardi (ST)	Belagavi	Chikkodi	2,03,082	
11	Belgaum Uttar	Belagavi	Belgaum	2,51,578	
12	Belgaum Dakshin	Belagavi	Belgaum	2,48,626	
13	Belgaum Rural	Belagavi	Belgaum	2,59,537	
14	Khanapur	Belagavi	Uttara Kannada	2,14,456	
15	Kittur	Belagavi	Uttara Kannada	1,95,886	
16	Bailhongal	Belagavi	Belgaum	1,95,828	
17	Saundatti Yellamma	Belagavi	Belgaum	1,99,847	
18	Ramdurg	Belagavi	Belgaum	2,03,880	
19	Mudhol (SC)	Bagalkot	Bagalkot	2,01,307	
20	Terdal	Bagalkot	Bagalkot	2,27,749	
21	Jamkhandi	Bagalkot	Bagalkot	2,14,797	
22	Bilgi	Bagalkot	Bagalkot	2,31,594	
23	Badami	Bagalkot	Bagalkot	2,20,435	
24	Bagalkot	Bagalkot	Bagalkot	2,45,532	
25	Hungund	Bagalkot	Bagalkot	2,22,676	
26	Muddebihal	Vijayapura	Bijapur	2,17,281	
27	Devar Hippargi	Vijayapura	Bijapur	2,19,228	
28	Basavana Bagevadi	Vijayapura	Bijapur	2,10,088	
29	Babaleshwar	Vijayapura	Bijapur	2,17,491	
30	Bijapur City	Vijayapura	Bijapur	2,81,726	
31	Nagathan (SC)	Vijayapura	Bijapur	2,69,309	
32	Indi	Vijayapura	Bijapur	2,42,910	
33	Sindagi	Vijayapura	Bijapur	2,36,670	
34	Afzalpur	Kalaburagi	Gulbarga	2,28,171	
35	Jevargi	Kalaburagi	Gulbarga	2,39,914	
36	Shorapur (ST)	Yadgir	Raichur	2,75,483	
37	Shahapur	Yadgir	Raichur	2,38,979	
38	Yadgir	Yadgir	Raichur	2,37,435	
39	Gurmitkal	Yadgir	Gulbarga	2,48,181	
40	Chittapur (SC)	Kalaburagi	Gulbarga	2,35,755	
41	Sedam	Kalaburagi	Gulbarga	2,25,688	
42	Chincholi (SC)	Kalaburagi	Bidar	2,03,600	
43	Gulbarga Rural (SC)	Kalaburagi	Gulbarga	2,57,752	
44	Gulbarga Dakshin	Kalaburagi	Gulbarga	2,79,251	
45	Gulbarga Uttar	Kalaburagi	Gulbarga	3,07,091	
46	Aland	Kalaburagi	Bidar	2,41,750	
47	Basavakalyan	Bidar	Bidar	2,46,581	
48	Humnabad	Bidar	Bidar	2,45,996	
49	Bidar South	Bidar	Bidar	2,05,201	
50	Bidar	Bidar	Bidar	2,28,035	
51	Bhalki	Bidar	Bidar	2,30,959	
52	Aurad (SC)	Bidar	Bidar	2,19,444	
53	Raichur Rural (ST)	Raichur	Raichur	2,29,071	
54	Raichur	Raichur	Raichur	2,32,744	
55	Manvi (ST)	Raichur	Raichur	2,33,867	
56	Devadurga (ST)	Raichur	Raichur	2,33,492	
57	Lingsugur (SC)	Raichur	Raichur	2,55,628	
58	Sindhanur	Raichur	Koppal	2,39,285	
59	Maski (ST)	Raichur	Koppal	2,11,183	
60	Kushtagi	Koppal	Koppal	2,33,835	
61	Kanakagiri (SC)	Koppal	Koppal	2,24,068	
62	Gangawati	Koppal	Koppal	2,02,243	
63	Yelburga	Koppal	Koppal	2,23,211	
64	Koppal	Koppal	Koppal	2,54,021	
65	Shirahatti (SC)	Gadag	Haveri	2,26,999	
66	Gadag	Gadag	Haveri	2,22,792	
67	Ron	Gadag	Haveri	2,32,510	
68	Nargund	Gadag	Bagalkot	1,87,212	
69	Navalgund	Dharwad	Dharwad	2,07,237	
70	Kundgol	Dharwad	Dharwad	1,86,825	
71	Dharwad	Dharwad	Dharwad	2,14,132	
72	Hubli-Dharwad East (SC)	Dharwad	Dharwad	2,09,530	
73	Hubli-Dharwad Central	Dharwad	Dharwad	2,49,371	
74	Hubli-Dharwad West	Dharwad	Dharwad	2,63,230	
75	Kalghatgi	Dharwad	Dharwad	1,94,742	
76	Haliyal	Uttara Kannada	Uttara Kannada	1,81,519	
77	Karwar	Uttara Kannada	Uttara Kannada	2,19,544	
78	Kumta	Uttara Kannada	Uttara Kannada	1,88,894	
79	Bhatkal	Uttara Kannada	Uttara Kannada	2,22,794	
80	Sirsi	Uttara Kannada	Uttara Kannada	2,00,755	
81	Yellapur	Uttara Kannada	Uttara Kannada	1,82,472	
82	Hangal	Haveri	Haveri	2,11,927	
83	Shiggaon	Haveri	Dharwad	2,26,226	
84	Haveri (SC)	Haveri	Haveri	2,33,307	
85	Byadgi	Haveri	Haveri	2,08,910	
86	Hirekerur	Haveri	Haveri	1,85,982	
87	Ranebennur	Haveri	Haveri	2,37,234	
88	Hoovina Hadagali (SC)	Vijayanagara	Bellary	1,91,338	
89	Hagaribommanahalli (SC)	Vijayanagara	Bellary	2,30,042	
90	Vijayanagara	Vijayanagara	Bellary	2,49,956	
91	Kampli (ST)	Ballary	Bellary	2,14,473	
92	Siruguppa (ST)	Ballary	Koppal	2,17,209	
93	Bellary Rural (ST)	Ballary	Bellary	2,38,361	
94	Bellary City	Ballary	Bellary	2,59,221	
95	Sandur (ST)	Ballary	Bellary	2,23,337	
96	Kudligi (ST)	Vijayanagara	Bellary	2,03,802	
97	Molakalmuru (ST)	Chitradurga	Chitradurga	2,43,788	
98	Challakere (ST)	Chitradurga	Chitradurga	2,20,968	
99	Chitradurga	Chitradurga	Chitradurga	2,62,552	
100	Hiriyur	Chitradurga	Chitradurga	2,43,619	
101	Hosadurga	Chitradurga	Chitradurga	1,97,693	
102	Holalkere (SC)	Chitradurga	Chitradurga	2,35,346	
103	Jagalur (ST)	Devangere	Davangere	1,93,028	
104	Harapanahalli	Vijayanagara	Davangere	2,17,175	
105	Harihar	Devangere	Davangere	2,07,589	
106	Davanagere North	Devangere	Davangere	2,41,278	
107	Davanagere South	Devangere	Davangere	2,10,708	
108	Mayakonda (SC)	Devangere	Davangere	1,91,421	
109	Channagiri	Devangere	Davangere	1,99,517	
110	Honnali	Devangere	Davangere	1,99,012	
111	Shimoga Rural (SC)	Shimoga	Shimoga	2,12,458	
112	Bhadravati	Shimoga	Shimoga	2,12,359	
113	Shimoga	Shimoga	Shimoga	2,60,757	
114	Tirthahalli	Shimoga	Shimoga	1,88,267	
115	Shikaripura	Shimoga	Shimoga	1,98,883	
116	Soraba	Shimoga	Shimoga	1,95,341	
117	Sagar	Shimoga	Shimoga	2,05,262	
118	Byndoor	Udupi	Shimoga	2,35,716	
119	Kundapura	Udupi	Udupi Chikmagalur	2,09,592	
120	Udupi	Udupi	Udupi Chikmagalur	2,16,989	
121	Kapu	Udupi	Udupi Chikmagalur	1,89,007	
122	Karkala	Udupi	Udupi Chikmagalur	1,90,611	
123	Sringeri	Chikmagalur	Udupi Chikmagalur	1,70,579	
124	Mudigere (SC)	Chikmagalur	Udupi Chikmagalur	1,72,084	
125	Chikmagalur	Chikmagalur	Udupi Chikmagalur	2,30,738	
126	Tarikere	Chikmagalur	Udupi Chikmagalur	1,93,745	
127	Kadur	Chikmagalur	Hassan	2,06,584	
128	Chiknayakanhalli	Tumakuru	Tumkur	2,18,952	
129	Tiptur	Tumakuru	Tumkur	1,84,334	
130	Turuvekere	Tumakuru	Tumkur	1,82,717	
131	Kunigal	Tumakuru	Bangalore Rural	1,98,794	
132	Tumkur City	Tumakuru	Tumkur	2,58,925	
133	Tumkur Rural	Tumakuru	Tumkur	2,08,826	
134	Koratagere (SC)	Tumakuru	Tumkur	2,04,692	
135	Gubbi	Tumakuru	Tumkur	1,81,139	
136	Sira	Tumakuru	Chitradurga	2,23,648	
137	Pavagada (SC)	Tumakuru	Chitradurga	1,93,100	
138	Madhugiri	Tumakuru	Tumkur	1,93,581	
139	Gauribidanur	Chikkaballapura	Chikballapur	2,10,462	
140	Bagepalli	Chikkaballapura	Chikballapur	2,01,055	
141	Chikkaballapur	Chikkaballapura	Chikballapur	2,09,846	
142	Sidlaghatta	Chikkaballapura	Kolar	2,03,564	
143	Chintamani	Chikkaballapura	Kolar	2,25,460	
144	Srinivaspur	Kolar	Kolar	2,16,763	
145	Mulbagal (SC)	Kolar	Kolar	2,16,636	
146	Kolar Gold Field (SC)	Kolar	Kolar	1,99,982	
147	Bangarapet (SC)	Kolar	Kolar	2,05,294	
148	Kolar	Kolar	Kolar	2,40,487	
149	Malur	Kolar	Kolar	1,92,717	
150	Yelahanka	Bangalore Urban	Chikballapur	4,39,087	
151	Krishnarajapuram	Bangalore Urban	Bangalore North	5,10,777	
152	Byatarayanapura	Bangalore Urban	Bangalore North	5,08,799	
153	Yeshwantpur	Bangalore Urban	Bangalore North	5,64,208	
154	Rajarajeshwarinagar	Bangalore Urban	Bangalore Rural	4,85,815	
155	Dasarahalli	Bangalore Urban	Bangalore North	4,57,187	
156	Mahalakshmi Layout	Bangalore Urban	Bangalore North	2,92,040	
157	Malleshwaram	Bangalore Urban	Bangalore North	2,27,484	
158	Hebbal	Bangalore Urban	Bangalore North	2,88,971	
159	Pulakeshinagar (SC)	Bangalore Urban	Bangalore North	2,39,090	
160	Sarvagnanagar	Bangalore Urban	Bangalore Central	3,66,876	
161	C. V. Raman Nagar (SC)	Bangalore Urban	Bangalore Central	2,71,340	
162	Shivajinagar	Bangalore Urban	Bangalore Central	1,94,070	
163	Shanti Nagar	Bangalore Urban	Bangalore Central	2,20,880	
164	Gandhi Nagar	Bangalore Urban	Bangalore Central	2,31,449	
165	Rajaji Nagar	Bangalore Urban	Bangalore Central	2,07,557	
166	Govindraj Nagar	Bangalore Urban	Bangalore South	2,96,389	
167	Vijay Nagar	Bangalore Urban	Bangalore South	3,05,856	
168	Chamrajpet	Bangalore Urban	Bangalore Central	2,29,914	
169	Chickpet	Bangalore Urban	Bangalore South	2,21,216	
170	Basavanagudi	Bangalore Urban	Bangalore South	2,33,600	
171	Padmanabhanagar	Bangalore Urban	Bangalore South	2,78,959	
172	B.T.M. Layout	Bangalore Urban	Bangalore South	2,75,067	
173	Jayanagar	Bangalore Urban	Bangalore South	2,10,079	
174	Mahadevapura (SC)	Bangalore Urban	Bangalore Central	6,07,255	
175	Bommanahalli	Bangalore Urban	Bangalore South	4,52,808	
176	Bangalore South	Bangalore Urban	Bangalore Rural	6,95,797	
177	Anekal (SC)	Bangalore Urban	Bangalore Rural	4,02,620	
178	Hosakote	Bangalore Rural	Chikballapur	2,34,098	
179	Devanahalli (SC)	Bangalore Rural	Chikballapur	2,12,209	
180	Doddaballapur	Bangalore Rural	Chikballapur	2,14,240	
181	Nelamangala (SC)	Bangalore Rural	Chikballapur	2,17,473	
182	Magadi	Ramanagara	Bangalore Rural	2,33,433	
183	Ramanagaram	Ramanagara	Bangalore Rural	2,16,086	
184	Kanakapura	Ramanagara	Bangalore Rural	2,24,987	
185	Channapatna	Ramanagara	Bangalore Rural	2,30,381	
186	Malavalli (SC)	Mandya	Mandya	2,48,577	
187	Maddur	Mandya	Mandya	2,13,854	
188	Melukote	Mandya	Mandya	2,00,184	
189	Mandya	Mandya	Mandya	2,24,370	
190	Shrirangapattana	Mandya	Mandya	2,13,244	
191	Nagamangala	Mandya	Mandya	2,14,272	
192	Krishnarajapet	Mandya	Mandya	2,19,983	
193	Shravanabelagola	Hassan	Hassan	2,05,242	
194	Arsikere	Hassan	Hassan	2,16,204	
195	Belur	Hassan	Hassan	1,97,840	
196	Hassan	Hassan	Hassan	2,28,436	
197	Holenarasipur	Hassan	Hassan	2,20,511	
198	Arkalgud	Hassan	Hassan	2,27,985	
199	Sakleshpur (SC)	Hassan	Hassan	2,05,876	
200	Belthangady	Dakshina Kannada	Dakshina Kannada	2,28,941	
201	Moodabidri	Dakshina Kannada	Dakshina Kannada	2,05,099	
202	Mangalore City North	Dakshina Kannada	Dakshina Kannada	2,49,464	
203	Mangalore City South	Dakshina Kannada	Dakshina Kannada	2,45,805	
204	Mangalore	Dakshina Kannada	Dakshina Kannada	2,05,149	
205	Bantval	Dakshina Kannada	Dakshina Kannada	2,28,415	
206	Puttur	Dakshina Kannada	Dakshina Kannada	2,12,848	
207	Sullia (SC)	Dakshina Kannada	Dakshina Kannada	2,06,210	
208	Madikeri	Kodagu	Mysore	2,32,799	
209	Virajpet	Kodagu	Mysore	2,24,936	
210	Periyapatna	Mysore	Mysore	1,95,631	
211	Krishnarajanagara	Mysore	Mandya	2,18,050	
212	Hunsur	Mysore	Mysore	2,41,653	
213	Heggadadevankote (ST)	Mysore	Chamarajanagar	2,25,857	
214	Nanjangud (SC)	Mysore	Chamarajanagar	2,20,420	
215	Chamundeshwari	Mysore	Mysore	3,29,223	
216	Krishnaraja	Mysore	Mysore	2,50,435	
217	Chamaraja	Mysore	Mysore	2,46,297	
218	Narasimharaja	Mysore	Mysore	2,88,775	
219	Varuna	Mysore	Chamarajanagar	2,34,533	
220	T. Narasipur (SC)	Mysore	Chamarajanagar	2,04,865	
221	Hanur	Chamarajanagar	Chamarajanagar	2,21,630	
222	Kollegal (SC)	Chamarajanagar	Chamarajanagar	2,16,643	
223	Chamarajanagar	Chamarajanagar	Chamarajanagar	2,09,521	
224	Gundlupet	Chamarajanagar	Chamarajanagar	2,13,888	

== Former constituencies ==
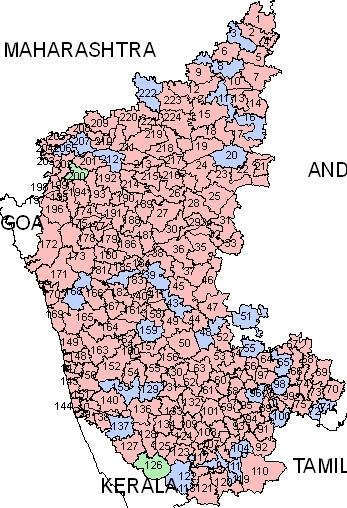
Karnataka Legislative Assembly constituencies (1978-2008)

#	Name	Reserved for (SC/ST/)	District	Remarks
	Ankola		Uttara Kannada	
	Bagepalli Gudibande		Kolar district	
	Ballolli		Bijapur district	
	Bangalore North		Bangalore district	
	Bannur		Mysore district	
	Baradol		Bijapur district	
	Belgaum		Belagavi district	
	Belgaum I		Belagavi district	
	Belgaum II		Belagavi district	
	Bellary		Ballari district	
	Bellavi		Tumakuru district	
	Bethamangala		Kolar district	
	Bhagamandala Nad		Kodagu district	Part of Coorg State until 31 October 1956 (before merger to Mysore State)
	Bharamasagara		Chitradurga district	
	Bharathinagar		Bengaluru Urban district	
	Bijapur		Bijapur district	
	Biligere		Mysore district	
	Binnypet		Bengaluru Urban district	
	Birur		Chikmagalur district	
	Brahmavar		Udupi district	
	Broadway		Bengaluru Urban district	
	Chandrashekarapura		Tumakuru district	
	Channarayapatna		Hassan district	
	Chikkodi		Belagavi district	
	Chikmagalur Mudigere		Chikmagalur district	
	Cubbonpet		Bangalore district	
	Davanagere		Davanagere district	
	Dharwad Rural		Dharwad district	
	Fort		Bangalore district	
	Gandasi		Hassan district	
	Gokak I		Belagavi district	
	Gokak II		Belagavi district	
	Gulbarga		Gulbarga district	
	Guledgud		Bagalkot district	
	Gulur		Tumakuru district	
	Gundlupet Heggadadevanakote		Mysore district	
	Halasuru		Bangalore district	
	Hebbur		Tumakuru district	
	Hire Bagewadi		Belagavi district	
	Holehonnur		Shimoga district	
	Honnavar		Uttara Kannada	
	Hubli City		Dharwad district	
	Hubli Rural		Dharwad district	
	Hosakote Anekal		Bangalore district	
	Hosanagar		Shimoga district	
	Hospet		Ballari district	
	Huliyurdurga		Tumakuru district	
	Hulsoor		Bidar district	
	Huvina Hippargi		Bijapur district	
	Javagal		Hassan district	
	Jayamahal		Bengaluru Urban district	
	Kalgi		Kalaburagi district	
	Kallambella		Tumakuru district	
	Kalmala		Raichur district	
	Kamalapur		Gulbarga district	
	Keragodu		Mandya district	
	Kiragaval		Mandya district	
	Kora		Tumakuru district	
	Koratagere-Madhugiri		Tumakuru district	
	Kottur		Bellary district	
	Kudur		Bangalore district	
	Kurugodu		Bellary district	
	Kushalnagar		Kodagu district	Part of Coorg State until 31 October 1956 (before merger to Mysore State)
	Madikeri Town		Kodagu district	Part of Coorg State until 31 October 1956 (before merger to Mysore State)
	Mangalore City		Dakshina Kannada	
	Mulbagal Srinivasapur		Kolar district	
	Mundargi		Gadag district	
	Murnad		Kodagu district	Part of Coorg State until 31 October 1956 (before merger to Mysore State)
	Mysore City North		Mysore district	
	Mysore City South		Mysore district	
	Mysore Taluk		Mysore district	
	Palya		Mysore district	
	Pandavapura		Mandya district	
	Panemangalore		Dakshina Kannada	
	Parasgad		Belagavi district	
	Robertsonpet		Kolar district	
	Sadalga		Belagavi district	
	Sagar Hosanagar		Shimoga district	
	Sampagaon I		Belagavi district	
	Sampagaon II		Belagavi district	
	Sankeshwar		Belagavi district	
	Santhemarahalli		Chamarajanagar district	
	Sathanur		Bangalore Rural district	
	Santpur		Bidar district	
	Shahabad		Gulbarga district	
	Sanivarasanthe		Kodagu district	Part of Coorg State until 31 October 1956 (before merger to Mysore State)
	Sidlaghatta Chikballapur		Kolar district	
	Solur		Bangalore district	
	Somvarpet		Kodagu district	
	Somwarpet North		Kodagu district	Part of Coorg State until 31 October 1956 (before merger to Mysore State)
	Somwarpet South		Kodagu district	Part of Coorg State until 31 October 1956 (before merger to Mysore State)
	Soraba Shikaripur		Shimoga district	
	St. John's Hill		Bengaluru Urban district	
	Suntikoppa		Kodagu district	Part of Coorg State until 31 October 1956 (before merger to Mysore State)
	Surathkal		Dakshina Kannada	
	Talikoti		Bijapur district	
	Tirthahalli Koppa		Shimoga district and Chikmagalur district	
	Tikota		Bijapur district	
	Tumkur		Tumkur district	
	Uchagaon		Belagavi district	
	Ullal		Dakshina Kannada	
	Uttarahalli		Bengaluru Urban district	
	Varthur		Bengaluru Urban district	
	Vemgal		Kolar district	
	Vittal		Dakshina Kannada	
	Virupakshipura		Bangalore district	
	Yelandur		Mysore district	

== See also ==
- State legislative assemblies of India
- Karnataka Legislative Assembly
