= H. C. L. Reddy =

Indian politician

H. C. Linga Reddy was a prominent Indian National Congress (INC) politician from Karnataka who served as the Member of Parliament for Chikballapur in the 3rd Lok Sabha following a 1965 by-election victory. A veteran state leader, he also represented the Malur Assembly constituency as an MLA in 1952, 1957, and 1967.

== Political career ==
Reddy's political career was primarily centered in the state of Karnataka. He was elected as a Member of the Legislative Assembly (MLA) from the Malur constituency in the 1967 Karnataka state assembly elections, running as a candidate for the Indian National Congress. His tenure followed that of S. V. Rame Gowda (an Independent) and preceded the 1972 election of A. V. Muniswamy. The Malur constituency has historically been a competitive seat, represented by various parties including the INC, Janata Party, and Bharatiya Janata Party.

== Election history ==
The following table highlights his participation in the Malur legislative elections:

Election Year	Member	Political Party
1952	H. C. Linga Reddy	Indian National Congress
1962	S. V. Rame Gowda	Independent
1967	H. C. L. Reddy	Indian National Congress
1972	A. V. Muniswamy	Indian National Congress
