= Adigarakallahalli =

- village
- Location in Karnataka, India Adigarakallahalli (India)
- Coordinates: 12.8235600°N 77.8005200°E
- Country: India
- State: Karnataka
- District: Bangalore
- Talukas: Anekal

Government
  - Body: Village Panchayat

Languages
  - Official: Kannada
- Time zone: UTC+5:30 (IST)
- PIN: 562 107
- Nearest city: Bangalore
- Civic agency: Village Panchayat

Adigarakallahalli is a village in the southern state of Karnataka, India. It is located in the Anekal taluk of Bangalore district in Karnataka.

== Demographics ==
As of 2011 India census, A Medihalli had a population of 2,915. Males constitute 1,519 of the population and females 1,396. Kannada is the official and most widely spoken language in A Medihalli. A Medihalli has an average literacy rate of 68.30 percent, higher than the national average of 59.5 percent, with 71.49 percent of the males and 64.83 percent of females literate.
