= P. R. Brahmananda =

Indian economist (1926–2003)

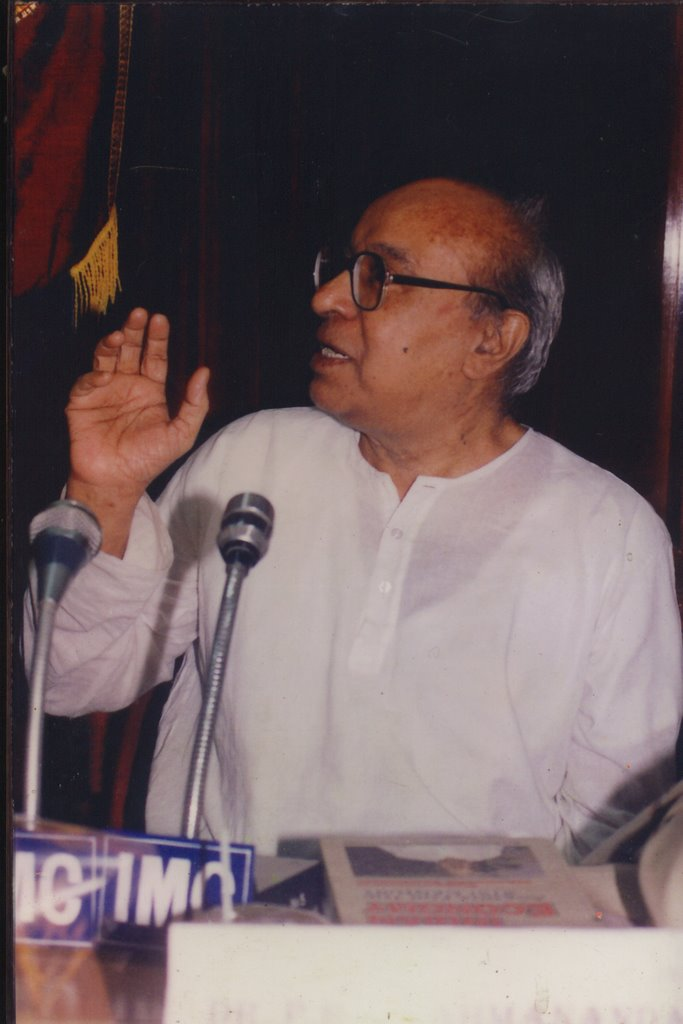
- Brahmananda
- Born: Palahalli Ramaiya Brahmananda; 27 September 1926
- Died: 23 January 2003 (aged 76)
- Education: Maharaja's College, Mysore; University of Mysore; University of Mumbai
- Years active: 1949–1986
- Known for: Monetary economics

Palahalli Ramaiya Brahmananda (27 September 1926 – 23 January 2003) was an Indian monetary economist. He co-developed the Wage Goods Model with Chandulal Nagindas Vakil in 1956 and took part in India's anti-inflation policies during the economic crisis of the 1970s. He has published over 150 books and 1,000 articles.

== Early life and education ==
Brahmananda was born on 27 September 1926 in the Kingdom of Mysore as the eldest of four children to P.R. Ramaiya (a former Member of the Karnataka Legislative Assembly and Kannada journalist) and P.R. Jayalakshamma (a former deputy mayor of Bengaluru). After completing his early schooling at Fort High School in Chamrajpet, Brahmananda moved to Mysore to pursue undergraduate studies at Maharaja's College.

== Career ==
Brahmananda joined Mumbai University as a research assistant in 1949. In 1953, he earned his PhD under the guidance of D.T. Lakdawala with his thesis "Studies in Economics of Welfare Maximisation". It was later published as a monograph by the Bombay University Press.

Brahmananda worked at Mumbai University for 37 years. He would eventually become the Reserve Bank of India Endowment Professor in Monetary Economics in 1962 and the Director of the Department of Economics in 1976. He retired from the department in 1986.

During his last year at Mumbai University, he was also a visiting professor at the Delhi School of Economics. Following retirement, he was a UGC National Fellow and an ICSSR National Fellow. He was also an Honorary Visiting Fellow at the Institute of Social and Economic Change (ISEC) and an Honorary Professor at the Indian Statistical Institute in Bengaluru until he died in 2003.

Throughout his career, Brahmananda held various positions in academia and government. In government roles, he served as the president of the Diamond Jubilee Conference (1976), the chairman of the Platinum Jubilee Committee (1993–94) of the Indian Economic Association, a member of the panel of economists to the Planning Commission and Finance Ministry, and was an honorary economic advisor to the Government of Maharashtra after its formation. In 1996, he was awarded the Outstanding Economist award by Financial Express. In 2002, he was made the Honorary President of the International Economic Association.

== Contributions to economics ==
=== Development of the Wage Goods Model ===
In late 1956, Brahmananda and economist C.N. Vakil published "Planning for an Expanding Economy," a critique of the emphasis on capital goods and heavy industries in the Second Five-Year Plan.

Brahmananda and Vakil argued that the plan's strategy was inequitable and that, in a capital-deficient economy such as India, it would result in insufficient investment in other sectors. They further contended that the approach would generate inflation as rising incomes increased demand for consumer goods. As an alternative to the Mahalanobis strategy underpinning the Second Five-Year Plan, they proposed the Wage Goods Model. The Wage Goods Model prioritised goods commonly consumed by wage earners, including food grains, dairy products, fish, eggs, meat, salt, sugar, soap, and medicines, as well as basic services such as education, healthcare, and electricity. Vakil and Brahmananda maintained that investment in these sectors would address supply shortages and contribute to reducing poverty, unemployment, and disguised unemployment.

The proposal did not gain official adoption. At a meeting of the Panel of Senior Economists, 20 of 21 members endorsed the Mahalanobis plan, which was subsequently implemented by the Government of India and continued to influence Indian planning strategy for several subsequent years. In a later interview, Brahmananda stated that their critique of the Second Five-Year Plan resulted in his and Vakil's exclusion from official planning discussions. He recalled to V.N. Balasubramanian that critics of the Mahalanobis model at the time were characterised as "anti-national" or accused of being CIA agents. Brahmananda continued to develop the Wage Goods Model throughout his career.

=== Engagement with development theory and classical economics ===
Brahmananda was interested in the theoretical aspects of Economics. His major contribution to economic theory was the reconstruction of classical economics for developing countries, and he provided conceptual refinements for many precepts of welfare economics. In 1961, Piero Sraffa of Cambridge University released his book "Production of Commodities by Means of Commodities”, a reworking of Ricardian value theory. Brahmananda was the first economist to praise and critique Sraffa's theory, delivering six lectures and publishing three articles between 1962 and 1963. Sraffa considered the articles an achievement, and Jacob Viner thought them equal to Sraffa's in abstraction and thought.

He conducted a parallel exercise to the 'Sraffa Revolution' in search of an invariant measure of value and is credited with enriching India's monetary traditions. In monetary theory, Brahmananda focused on the effect of commodity hoarding on output and prices in developing countries. He also developed a general theory of the interest rate incorporating ideas of Böhm-Bawerk, Schumpeter, and Sraffa.

=== Monetary economics and anti-inflation policies ===
In February 1974, when inflation in India reached 25.3%, Brahmananda prepared a memorandum with proposals to reduce inflation and submitted it to the Prime Minister Indira Gandhi. The memorandum, entitled ‘A policy to contain inflation,’ was supplemented with a Scheme of the Economists for Monetary Immobilization through Bond Medallions and Blocked Accounts, also called SEMIBOMBLA. The memorandum, supported by 140 economists, is believed to have influenced the anti-inflation policies announced in July 1974.

His statements and papers on the Indian economy, including government policies, received public attention. He remained independent from government commitments, enabling him to present standpoints that were often unpalatable to authorities. He advocated for the autonomy of the Reserve Bank of India. A proposed reason for the occasional lack of acceptance of Brahmananda's ideas was that they were often couched in pedagogic terms.

=== Teaching career ===
Throughout his teaching career at Mumbai University, he regularly offered courses in development economics, monetary theory, and central banking. For his decades of teaching in Economics, he was awarded the Best Teacher Award by the Government of Maharashtra. Brahmananda was the editor of the Indian Economic Journal almost since its inception in 1952–53.

=== Final years, death and legacy ===
Brahmananda never married. He wrote two books in the last few years of his life. The history of economic thought from a classical point took the form of ‘Nobel Economics’ in 1999. According to American economist Robert Solow, the book was "a work of remarkable scope for a single scholar to write." His last work, 'Money, Income, Prices in 19th Century India', is a historical and theoretical study. Lord Meghnad Desai described the book as a source of information on the Indian economy and the high points of the monetary history of many other nations.

Brahmananda died on 23 January 2003 at the age of 76 in his home in Bengaluru. The Financial Express called him the "unsung hero of Indian economics" and said that "his knowledge of economic theory and the grip on empirical economics was almost encyclopedic."

In 2004, the Reserve Bank of India instituted the P R Brahmananda Memorial Lecture Series in his memory. The inaugural lecture was delivered by Lord Meghnad Desai in September 2004. Four more lectures were delivered until 2018. In 2009, the Professor P R Brahmananda Endowment Research Grant was set up at the Institute for Social and Economic Change as an annual research award on monetary policy.
