= Bhadravati Assembly constituency =

Legislative Assembly constituency in Karnataka State, India

Coordinates: 13.84°N 75.71°E

Bhadravati
- Constituency No. 112 for the Karnataka Legislative Assembly

Constituency details
- Country: India
- Region: South India
- State: Karnataka
- District: Shimoga
- Lok Sabha constituency: Shimoga
- Established: 1951
- Total electors: 212,359
- Reservation: None

Member of Legislative Assembly
- 16th Karnataka Legislative Assembly
- Incumbent B. K. Sangameshwara
- Party: Indian National Congress
- Elected year: 2023
- Preceded by: M. J. Appaji Gowda

Bhadravati Assembly constituency is one of the 224 Legislative Assembly constituencies of Karnataka state in India.

It is part of Shimoga district. B. K. Sangameshwara is the current MLA from Bhadravati.

== Members of the Legislative Assembly ==
Election	Member	Party
1952	B. Madhavachar	Indian National Congress
1957	D. T. Seetarama Rao	Indian National Congress
1962	T. D. Devendrappa	Indian National Congress
1967	Abdul Khuddus Anwar	Praja Socialist Party
1972	Abdul Khuddus Anwar	Indian National Congress
1978	G. Rajashekar	Indian National Congress
1983	Salera. S. Siddappa	Janata Party
1985	Salera. S. Siddappa	Independent politician
1989	Isamia. S	Indian National Congress
1994	M. J. Appaji Gowda	Independent politician
1999	M. J. Appaji Gowda	Independent politician
2004	B. K. Sangameshwara	Independent politician
2008	B. K. Sangameshwara	Indian National Congress
2013	M. J. Appaji Gowda	Janata Dal
2018	B. K. Sangameshwara	Indian National Congress
2023	B. K. Sangameshwara	Indian National Congress

== Election results ==
=== Assembly Election 2023 ===
2023 Karnataka Legislative Assembly election : Bhadravati
Party	Candidate	Votes	%	±%
INC	B. K. Sangameshwara	66,208	42.63%	▼6.90
JD(S)	Sharada Appaji	63,503	40.89%	▼1.08
BJP	Mangote Rudresh	21,279	13.70%	▲7.83
AAP	Ananda Maruthi Medicals	1,387	0.89%	New
NOTA	None of the above	803	0.52%	▼0.41
Margin of victory		2,705	1.74%	▼5.83
Turnout		155,480	73.22%	▼0.45
Total valid votes		155,311		
Registered electors		212,359		▲2.22
INC hold		Swing	▼6.90	

=== Assembly Election 2018 ===
2018 Karnataka Legislative Assembly election : Bhadravati
Party	Candidate	Votes	%	±%
INC	B. K. Sangameshwara	75,722	49.53%	▲33.54
JD(S)	M. J. Appaji Gowda	64,155	41.97%	▼14.15
BJP	Praveen Patel. G. R	8,974	5.87%	▲4.60
NOTA	None of the above	1,427	0.93%	New
Margin of victory		11,567	7.57%	▼24.01
Turnout		153,056	73.67%	▲1.64
Total valid votes		152,877		
Registered electors		207,749		▲4.21
INC gain from JD(S)		Swing	▼6.59	

=== Assembly Election 2013 ===
2013 Karnataka Legislative Assembly election : Bhadravati
Party	Candidate	Votes	%	±%
JD(S)	M. J. Appaji Gowda	78,370	56.12%	▲14.01
Independent	B. K. Sangameshwara	34,271	24.54%	New
INC	C. M. Ibrahim	22,329	15.99%	▼26.51
Independent	Hanumantharao	2,254	1.61%	New
BJP	S. B. Shivaji Rao Sindhya	1,779	1.27%	▼9.40
Independent	Hanumanthappa	1,282	0.92%	New
Independent	Ahamed Ali	1,084	0.78%	New
Margin of victory		44,099	31.58%	▲31.19
Turnout		143,596	72.03%	▲8.17
Total valid votes		139,648		
Registered electors		199,362		▲1.53
JD(S) gain from INC		Swing	▲13.62	

=== Assembly Election 2008 ===
2008 Karnataka Legislative Assembly election : Bhadravati
Party	Candidate	Votes	%	±%
INC	B. K. Sangameshwara	53,257	42.50%	▲6.61
JD(S)	M. J. Appaji Gowda	52,770	42.11%	▲41.53
BJP	Ayanur Manjunatha	13,374	10.67%	▲2.28
BSP	C. Maheshkumar	2,532	2.02%	New
Independent	Akhil Ahmed	1,721	1.37%	New
SP	Babajan	829	0.66%	New
Swarna Yuga Party	S. Sathisha	817	0.65%	New
Margin of victory		487	0.39%	▼17.41
Turnout		125,391	63.86%	▲1.09
Total valid votes		125,300		
Registered electors		196,363		▲25.85
INC gain from Independent		Swing	▼11.19	

=== Assembly Election 2004 ===
2004 Karnataka Legislative Assembly election : Bhadravati
Party	Candidate	Votes	%	±%
Independent	B. K. Sangameshwara	52,572	53.69%	New
INC	M. J. Appaji Gowda	35,141	35.89%	▼0.99
BJP	M. Manjunath (kudligere)	8,218	8.39%	▼2.98
Margin of victory		17,431	17.80%	▲10.35
Turnout		97,934	62.77%	▼8.75
Total valid votes		97,922		
Registered electors		156,028		▲7.89
Independent hold		Swing	▲9.36	

=== Assembly Election 1999 ===
1999 Karnataka Legislative Assembly election : Bhadravati
Party	Candidate	Votes	%	±%
Independent	M. J. Appaji Gowda	43,923	44.33%	New
INC	B. K. Sangameshwara	36,537	36.88%	▲25.28
BJP	V. Kadiresh	11,266	11.37%	▼6.45
Independent	C. Maheshkumar	3,050	3.08%	New
JD(S)	C. Ramakrishna	2,154	2.17%	New
SP	Js Raja	1,078	1.09%	New
Independent	Bhadravathi Shivaram	713	0.72%	New
Margin of victory		7,386	7.45%	▼15.05
Turnout		103,426	71.52%	▲1.17
Total valid votes		99,077		
Rejected ballots		4,349	4.20%	▲2.72
Registered electors		144,615		▲5.67
Independent hold		Swing	▲0.21	

=== Assembly Election 1994 ===
1994 Karnataka Legislative Assembly election : Bhadravati
Party	Candidate	Votes	%	±%
Independent	M. J. Appaji Gowda	41,660	44.12%	New
JD	B. P. Shivakumar	20,412	21.62%	▲7.28
BJP	Navaneetha	16,830	17.82%	▲7.99
INC	Isamia. S	10,952	11.60%	▼29.04
INC	Mir Azeez Ahmed	2,215	2.35%	New
Kranti Sabha	D. M. Chandrappa	787	0.83%	▼3.02
Independent	Bhadravathi Shivaram	602	0.64%	New
Margin of victory		21,248	22.50%	▲10.62
Turnout		96,276	70.35%	▲4.41
Total valid votes		94,429		
Rejected ballots		1,428	1.48%	▼3.41
Registered electors		136,851		▼4.41
Independent gain from INC		Swing	▲3.48	

=== Assembly Election 1989 ===
1989 Karnataka Legislative Assembly election : Bhadravati
Party	Candidate	Votes	%	±%
INC	Isamia. S	36,487	40.64%	▲0.61
JP	M. J. Appaji Gowda	25,819	28.76%	New
JD	S. N. Ganganna	12,875	14.34%	New
BJP	Navaneetha	8,821	9.83%	▼5.97
Kranti Sabha	D. M. Chandrappa	3,461	3.85%	New
CPI	D. C. Mayanna	1,190	1.33%	New
Margin of victory		10,668	11.88%	▲9.04
Turnout		94,394	65.94%	▼0.60
Total valid votes		89,780		
Rejected ballots		4,614	4.89%	▲3.58
Registered electors		143,158		▲27.77
INC gain from Independent		Swing	▼2.23	

=== Assembly Election 1985 ===
1985 Karnataka Legislative Assembly election : Bhadravati
Party	Candidate	Votes	%	±%
Independent	Salera. S. Siddappa	31,540	42.87%	New
INC	Isamia. S	29,450	40.03%	▲2.51
BJP	D. G. Shivanna Gowda	11,628	15.80%	▲6.74
Margin of victory		2,090	2.84%	▼8.89
Turnout		74,552	66.54%	▼4.81
Total valid votes		73,572		
Rejected ballots		980	1.31%	▼0.80
Registered electors		112,040		▲11.47
Independent gain from JP		Swing	▼6.38	

=== Assembly Election 1983 ===
1983 Karnataka Legislative Assembly election : Bhadravati
Party	Candidate	Votes	%	±%
JP	Salera. S. Siddappa	34,576	49.25%	▲4.91
INC	D. Mnjappa	26,343	37.52%	▲35.58
BJP	Viswanath Koti	6,359	9.06%	New
LKD	K. Jyothilinga Rao	1,628	2.32%	New
IC(S)	K. Ningaiah	810	1.15%	New
Margin of victory		8,233	11.73%	▲6.44
Turnout		71,715	71.35%	▼2.15
Total valid votes		70,202		
Rejected ballots		1,513	2.11%	▼0.07
Registered electors		100,514		▲10.12
JP gain from INC(I)		Swing	▼0.39	

=== Assembly Election 1978 ===
1978 Karnataka Legislative Assembly election : Bhadravati
Party	Candidate	Votes	%	±%
INC(I)	G. Rajashekar	32,573	49.64%	New
JP	K. M. Javaraiah	29,099	44.34%	New
AIADMK	Chokkalingam	2,018	3.08%	New
INC	D. K. Thimmegowda	1,273	1.94%	▼40.85
Margin of victory		3,474	5.29%	▲2.49
Turnout		67,085	73.50%	▲6.12
Total valid votes		65,623		
Rejected ballots		1,462	2.18%	▲2.18
Registered electors		91,273		▲8.20
INC(I) gain from INC		Swing	▲6.85	

=== Assembly Election 1972 ===
1972 Mysore State Legislative Assembly election : Bhadravati
Party	Candidate	Votes	%	±%
INC	Abdul Khuddus Anwar	23,527	42.79%	▲4.06
INC(O)	K. M. Javaraiah	21,987	39.99%	New
ABJS	H. M. Siddappa	6,487	11.80%	New
Independent	P. Kannan	2,985	5.43%	New
Margin of victory		1,540	2.80%	▲1.59
Turnout		56,839	67.38%	▲3.79
Total valid votes		54,986		
Registered electors		84,355		▲25.44
INC gain from PSP		Swing	▲2.84	

=== Assembly Election 1967 ===
1967 Mysore State Legislative Assembly election : Bhadravati
Party	Candidate	Votes	%	±%
PSP	Abdul Khuddus Anwar	15,862	39.95%	▼0.18
INC	D. R. Gurushantappa	15,380	38.73%	▼12.84
Independent	T. D. Devendrappa	5,450	13.73%	New
Independent	B. G. R. Kadam	2,216	5.58%	New
Independent	A. Nagaraj	800	2.01%	New
Margin of victory		482	1.21%	▼10.23
Turnout		42,762	63.59%	▲6.58
Total valid votes		39,708		
Registered electors		67,245		▼4.91
PSP gain from INC		Swing	▼11.62	

=== Assembly Election 1962 ===
1962 Mysore State Legislative Assembly election : Bhadravati
Party	Candidate	Votes	%	±%
INC	T. D. Devendrappa	19,604	51.57%	▲0.76
PSP	B. Krishna Bhatt	15,256	40.13%	▲9.46
ABJS	K. R. Kenchappa	2,051	5.40%	New
CPI	S. M. Venkatappa	1,104	2.90%	New
Margin of victory		4,348	11.44%	▼8.70
Turnout		40,311	57.01%	▲2.15
Total valid votes		38,015		
Registered electors		70,714		▲31.40
INC hold		Swing	▲0.76	

=== Assembly Election 1957 ===
1957 Mysore State Legislative Assembly election : Bhadravati
Party	Candidate	Votes	%	±%
INC	D. T. Seetarama Rao	15,002	50.81%	▲0.12
PSP	M. P. Eswarappa	9,056	30.67%	New
Independent	N. Basavappa	4,553	15.42%	New
ABJS	K. N. Desai	912	3.09%	▼1.17
Margin of victory		5,946	20.14%	▼5.21
Turnout		29,523	54.86%	▲5.19
Total valid votes		29,523		
Registered electors		53,817		▲32.31
INC hold		Swing	▲0.12	

=== Assembly Election 1952 ===
1952 Mysore State Legislative Assembly election : Bhadravati
Party	Candidate	Votes	%	±%
INC	B. Madhavachar	10,241	50.69%	New
Socialist Party (India)	K. S. Ramachandra Setty	5,119	25.34%	New
KMPP	Dr. Bhujanga Rao	3,501	17.33%	New
ABJS	G. Koti Maleshappa	860	4.26%	New
Independent	V. V. Aiyar	482	2.39%	New
Margin of victory		5,122	25.35%	
Turnout		20,203	49.67%	
Total valid votes		20,203		
Registered electors		40,674		
INC win (new seat)				

== See also ==
- List of constituencies of the Karnataka Legislative Assembly
- Shimoga district
