= Kodigenahalli =

Kodigenahalli gutte kodigenahalli
- city
- Location in Karnataka, India
- Coordinates: 13.72°N 77.39°E
- Country: India
- State: Karnataka
- District: Bangalore
- Elevation: 668 m (2,192 ft)

Population (2001)
  - Total: 5,448

kannada and telagu
  - Official: Kannada
- Time zone: UTC+5:30 (IST)
- ISO 3166 code: IN-KA
- Vehicle registration: KA
- Website: karnataka.gov.in

Kodigenahalli is a census town in Tumkur district in the Indian state of Karnataka.

== Geography ==
Kodigenahalli is located at 13.72°N 77.39°E. It has an average elevation of 668 metres (2191 feet).

== Demographics ==
As of 2001 India census, Kodigenahalli had a population of 5448. Males constitute 51% of the population and females 49%. Kodigenahalli has an average literacy rate of 48%, lower than the national average of 59.5%: male literacy is 55%, and female literacy is 40%. In Kodigenahalli, 15% of the population is under 6 years of age.
