= T. B. Jayachandra =

Indian politician

Minister of Law and Parliamentary Affairs of Karnataka
- In office 18 May 2013 – 15 May 2018
- Preceded by: S. Suresh Kumar
- Succeeded by: Krishna Byregowda

Member of Karnataka Legislative Assembly
- Incumbent
- Assumed office 2023
- Preceded by: Rajesh Gowda
- Constituency: Sira
- In office 2008–2018
- Preceded by: B. Satyanarayana
- Succeeded by: B. Satyanarayana
- Constituency: Sira
- In office 1989–2004
- Preceded by: B. L. Gowda
- Succeeded by: Kiran Kumar K S
- Constituency: Kallambella
- In office 1978–1983
- Preceded by: T. Taregowda
- Succeeded by: B. Ganganna
- Constituency: Kallambella

Personal details
- Born: 29 July 1949 (age 77) Thimmanahalli Chikkanayakanahalli, Tumkur, Mysore State (now Karnataka), India
- Party: Indian National Congress
- Spouse: G. H. Nirmala
- Children: 3
- Education: Bachelor of Science; Bachelor of Laws
- Website: https://tbjayachandra.com/

Thimmanahalli Boraiah Jayachandra (29 July 1949) is an Indian politician and former member of the Karnataka Legislative Assembly from the Indian National Congress. He served as the Minister of Law and Parliamentary Affairs for Karnataka before losing his seat in 2018 assembly elections.

== Political career ==
Jayachandra was first elected to the Karnataka Legislative Assembly in 1978. He was elected to the Karnataka Legislative Assembly after winning from Sira during the 2013 elections. He lost from Sira in the Karnataka assembly elections 2018 to JD(S) candidate B Satyanarayana.

He was elected as a Member of the Karnataka Legislative Assembly, from the Kallambella & Sira constituencies of Tumkur District, Karnataka for 7 terms.

=== Cabinet Minister ===
He was the Cabinet Minister from 2013 until 2018 and handled the portfolios of Law, Parliamentary Affairs, Animal Husbandry, Endowments, Higher Education and Minor Irrigation very efficiently. He was also the Chairman of 16 Cabinet Sub-Committees, Vice Chairman for one Cabinet Sub Committee and Member of 24 Cabinet Sub-Committees. Besides being Chairman of the Committee for Simplification, Strengthening, Tracking of Govt. Programmes.

==== Positions held ====
Deputy leader of Opposition, Karnataka Legislative Assembly from 1994 – 99 and 2008 to 2013

Minister for Agriculture and District In-charge Minister of Tumkur District, from 17.10.1999 to 27.06.2002

Special representative of Government of Karnataka at New Delhi from 27.06.2002 to 11.12.2003 with the Status of Cabinet Minister

Minister for Food & Civil Supplies and District In-charge Minister of Mandya District, from 12.12.2003 to 28.5.2004

Minister for Law, Parliamentary Affairs, Animal Husbandry. Endowment (18.05.2013 – 30.10.2015) and District In-charge Minister of Tumkur District

Minister for Law, Parliamentary Affairs and Higher Education (from 30.10.2015 to 20.06.2016) and District In-charge Minister of Tumkur District

Minister for Law, Parliamentary Affairs and Minor Irrigation (from 21.06.2016 to 15.05.2018) and District In-charge Minister of Tumkur District.
