= A Medihalli =

- village
- A. Medihalli is in Bangalore district

- Location in Karnataka, India A Medihalli (India)
- Coordinates: 12.7081°N 77.69426°E
- Country: India
- State: Karnataka
- District: Bangalore
- Talukas: Anekal

Government
  - Body: Village Panchayat

Languages
  - Official: Kannada
- Time zone: UTC+5:30 (IST)
- PIN: 562 106
- Nearest city: Bangalore
- Civic agency: Village Panchayat

A Medihalli is a village in the southern state of Karnataka, India. It is located in the Anekal taluk of Bangalore district in Karnataka.

== Demographics ==
As of 2011 India census, A Medihalli had a population of 451. Males constitute 236 of the population and females 215. Kannada is the official and most widely spoken language in A Medihalli. A Medihalli has an average literacy rate of 77 percent, higher than the national average of 59.5 percent, with 76.69 percent of the males and 58.60 percent of females literate.

== See also ==
- Bangalore
- Districts of Karnataka
