= Hosakote Anekal Assembly constituency =

Former constituency in Karnataka, India

Coordinates: 12.991731°N 77.613025°E

Hoskote Anekal
- Former constituency for the State Legislative Assembly

Constituency details
- Country: India
- State: Mysore State
- District: Bangalore
- Lok Sabha constituency: Kolar and Bangalore
- Established: 1951
- Abolished: 1957

Hoskote Anekal Assembly constituency was one of the Vidhan Sabha constituencies in the state assembly of Mysore State, in India. It was part of Kolar and Bangalore Lok Sabha constituencies.

== Members of the Legislative Assembly ==
Year	Reservation	Member	Party
1952		Lakshmidevi Ramanna	Indian National Congress
1952		H. T. Puttappa	Indian National Congress
1957 onwards: Seat does not exist. See Hosakote, Anekal and Bangalore South

== Election results ==
=== Assembly Election 1952 ===
1952 Mysore State Legislative Assembly election : Hosakote Anekal
Party	Candidate	Votes	%	±%
INC	Lakshmidevi Ramanna	18,081	27.96%	New
INC	H. T. Puttappa	14,423	22.31%	New
KMPP	B. Channabyregowda	8,582	13.27%	New
Independent	Sharabanna	8,071	12.48%	New
KMPP	A. K. Jayamuthuraju	5,344	8.26%	New
Independent	J. C. Gulla Reddy Alias Venkataswamy Reddy	4,453	6.89%	New
Independent	M. Byanna	3,025	4.68%	New
ABJS	Ramaiah	1,886	2.92%	New
Independent	H. M. Abdul Khareem Sait	795	1.23%	New
Margin of victory		9,499	14.69%	
Turnout		64,660	43.17%	
Total valid votes		64,660		
Registered electors		74,885		
INC win (new seat)				
