= B. K. Sangameshwara =

Indian politician (born 1970)

B. K. Sangameshwara (born 1962) is an Indian politician from Karnataka who is a four time MLA from Bhadravati Assembly constituency in Shimoga district. He won the 2023 Karnataka Legislative Assembly election representing Indian National Congress with a very slender margin of 2705 votes..

He was appointed chairman for Karnataka Rural Infrastructure Development Ltd/Land Army on 26 January 2024.

== Early life and education ==
Sangameshwara is from Bhadravati, Shimoga district. His father Kotrappa is a farmer. He discontinued his studies after passing Class X.

== Career ==
Sangameshwara won from Bhadravati Assembly constituency representing Indian National Congress in the 2023 Karnataka Legislative Assembly election. He polled 66,208 votes and defeated his nearest rival, Sharada Appaji of Janata Dal (Secular), by a narrow margin of 2,705 votes.

He became an MLA for the first time winning the 2004 Karnataka Legislative Assembly election as an independent candidate defeating M. J. Appaji Gowda of Indian National Congress by a margin of 17,431 votes. He then joined the Congress party and retained the Bhadravati seat for a second term winning the 2008 Karnataka Legislative Assembly election defeating the same opponent, M. J. Appaji Gowda, who contested this time on JD(S) ticket. However, he lost the 2013 Assembly election to M. J. Appaji Gowda of Janata Dal (Secular) by a margin of 44,099 votes. But he regained the seat for the Congress Party winning the 2018 Karnataka Legislative Assembly election and made it a fourth term in 2023 election.
