= Shivalinge Gowda =

Shivalinge Gowda may refer to:

- K. L. Shivalinge Gowda, Indian politician born 1926
- K. M. Shivalinge Gowda, Indian politician born 1958
