= 1952 Mysore State Legislative Assembly election =

1952 Mysore Legislative Assembly election
- 26 March 1952

All 99 seats in the Mysore Legislative Assembly 50 seats needed for a majority
- Turnout: 50.38%
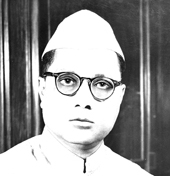
	First party	Second party
		KMPP
Leader	K. Chengalaraya Reddy
Party	INC	KMPP
Seats won	74	8
Popular vote	12,76,318	3,91,653
Percentage	46.35%	14.22%
Chief Minister before election
K. Chengalaraya Reddy
Elected Chief Minister
K. Hanumanthaiah
INC

Elections to the Legislative Assembly of the Indian state of Mysore were held on 26 March 1952. 394 candidates contested for 99 seats in 80 constituencies in the Assembly. There were 19 two-member constituencies and 61 single-member constituencies, accounting for 99 seats.

== Results ==
Summary of results of the 1952 Mysore Legislative Assembly election
Political party	Flag	Seats contested	Won	% of Seats	Votes	Vote %
Indian National Congress		99	74	74.75	12,76,318	46.35
Kisan Mazdoor Praja Party		59	8	8.08	3,91,653	14.22
Socialist Party		47	3	3.03	240390	8.73
Scheduled Caste Federation		7	2	2.02	47,916	1.74
Communist Party of India		5	1	1.01	25,116	0.91
Independent		154	11	11.11	7,10,359	25.79
Total seats		99	Voters	54,66,487	Turnout	27,53,870 (50.38%)

=== Results by constituency ===
District	Constituency		Turnout	Winner				Runner-up				Margin
District	No.	Name	%	Candidate	Party	Votes	%	Candidate	Party	Votes	%	Margin
Kolar	1	Malur	36.92	Linga Reddy	INC	6,560	42.24	Venkataramanappa	Ind	4,672	30.08	1,888
Kolar	2	Bangarapet	43.13	K. Chengalaraya Reddy	INC	10,761	63.73	Nagabhushana Gowda	SP	1,661	9.84	9,100
Kolar	3	Kolar Gold Fields	57.11	Swamidorai	SCF	19,911	22.51	Narayana Reddy	INC	17,286	19.54	2,625
Kolar	4	Kolar Gold Fields	57.11	Vasan	CPI	18,029	20.38	Muniswamy	INC	16,591	18.76	1,438
Kolar	5	Mulbagal Srinivasapur	47.34	Channiah	INC	Unopposed		—				—
Kolar	6	Mulbagal Srinivasapur	47.34	Narayana Gowda	INC	21,225	52.33	Narayana Swamy	Ind	13,789	34.00	7,436
Kolar	7	Bagepalli Gudibanda	59.37	B. V. Narayana Reddy	SP	13,446	54.35	Suryanarayana Joshi	INC	5,538	22.39	7,908
Kolar	8	Chintamani	39.61	Anjaneya Reddy	Ind	17,663	25.30	Gangi Reddy	Ind	16,844	24.13	819
Kolar	9	Chintamani	39.61	Narayanappa	Ind	9,412	13.48	—				—
Kolar	10	Kolar	40.81	Pattabhiraman	Ind	7,593	46.62	Hussain Sab	INC	4,758	29.22	2,835
Kolar	11	Sidlaghatta-Chikkaballapur	48.47	Papanna	INC	22,982	26.80	Venkatarayappa	Ind	19,082	22.25	3,900
Kolar	12	Sidlaghatta-Chikkaballapur	48.47	Muniyappa	INC	22,666	26.43	Bandi Muneppa	Ind	17,009	19.84	5,657
Kolar	13	Gowribidanur	60.25	Nagiah Reddy	INC	14,087	52.92	Venkatasami Gowda	Ind	11,066	41.57	3,021
Tumkur	14	Pavagada	50.93	Hanumanthiah	INC	24,332	31.51	Narayana Naika	KMPP	8,490	11.00	15,842
Tumkur	15	Pavagada	50.93	Mali Mariyappa	INC	22,883	29.64	Madhava Rao	SP	8,105	10.50	14,778
Tumkur	16	Koratagere-Madhugiri	48.30	Chennigaramiah	INC	17,590	22.08	Mukkannappa	Ind	10,257	12.88	7,333
Tumkur	17	Koratagere-Madhugiri	48.30	Mudduramaiah	INC	16,067	20.17	Bhimaiah	SP	8,163	10.25	7,904
Tumkur	18	Huliyurdurga	57.52	Hutchmastigowda	INC	14,863	61.28	Revanna Gowda	KMPP	5,864	24.18	8,999
Tumkur	19	Kunigal	64.80	Mudlagirigowda	INC	11,598	43.59	Byrappa	KMPP	7,081	26.61	4,517
Tumkur	20	Tumkur	59.02	M. V. Rama Rao	INC	13,434	53.38	Kempahonnaiah	KMPP	4,972	19.76	8,462
Tumkur	21	Kora	51.50	Nanjundaiah	INC	9,553	44.19	Sette Gowda	Ind	4,138	19.14	5,415
Tumkur	22	Sira	63.03	Ramegowda	Ind	11,387	41.61	Tharegowdaru	INC	10,401	38.01	986
Tumkur	23	Gubbi	58.37	Annayyappa	INC	8,171	33.60	Chennappa	SP	6,578	27.05	1,593
Tumkur	24	Turuvekere	69.83	B. Hutche Gowda	KMPP	10,603	38.18	Subramanyam	INC	9,823	35.37	780
Tumkur	25	Tiptur	59.35	Thimme Gowda	INC	9,980	38.96	Chandrasekhar	Ind	6,597	25.76	3,383
Tumkur	26	Chiknayakanahalli	61.70	Lingadevaru	INC	11,042	42.87	Mariappa	Ind	8,645	33.56	2,397
Bangalore	27	Malleswaram	50.43	Naidu	INC	9,441	40.65	Parthasarathy	SP	6,554	28.22	2,887
Bangalore	28	Gandhinagar	53.87	Venkatesh	INC	13,045	60.29	Sreenivasamurthy	KMPP	4,467	20.65	8,578
Bangalore	29	Chamarajpet	50.82	Anantharaman	INC	14,042	63.24	Lankappa	KMPP	3,512	15.82	10,530
Bangalore	30	Basavangudi	46.39	P. R. Ramaiya	INC	10,003	54.67	Sreekanteswar	SP	3,548	19.39	6,455
Bangalore	31	Cubbonpet	52.66	Seenappa	INC	8,226	37.00	Naganna	KMPP	4,334	19.50	3,892
Bangalore	32	Halasuru	47.45	Palaniappan	INC	7,307	36.89	Thamarai Kannan Doraiswamy	Ind	3,720	18.78	3,587
Bangalore	33	St. John's Hill	45.46	Mascarenhas	INC	7,870	42.62	Syed Abdur Rahman	Ind	4,745	25.70	3,125
Bangalore	34	Bangalore North	29.32	Byregowda	INC	15,189	26.96	Veeranna	Ind	5,186	9.21	10,003
Bangalore	35	Bangalore North	29.32	Munisamaiah	INC	13,203	23.44	Mune Gowda	SP	5,041	8.95	8,162
Bangalore	36	Doddaballapura	70.59	Totappa Siddalingiah	INC	20,130	70.36	Subbanna	KMPP	7,092	24.79	13,038
Bangalore	37	Nelamangala	36.68	Govindaraju	INC	14,771	26.37	Hanumantharaya	KMPP	10,865	19.40	3,906
Bangalore	38	Nelamangala	36.68	Prabhakar	INC	8,394	14.99	—				—
Bangalore	39	Magadi	55.62	Sidappa	INC	10,999	49.26	Singri Gowda	KMPP	9,803	43.90	1,196
Bangalore	40	Bangalore South	29.74	Narasimha Reddy	INC	9,637	21.20	Narayana Reddy	Ind	6,471	14.23	3,166
Bangalore	41	Bangalore South	29.74	Kempa Raj	INC	8,586	18.89	Nilgiri Sanjeevaiah	Ind	5,377	11.83	3,209
Bangalore	42	Hosakote Anekal	43.17	Lakshmidevi Ramanna	INC	18,081	27.96	Channabyregowda	KMPP	8,582	13.27	9,499
Bangalore	43	Hosakote Anekal	43.17	Puttappa	INC	14,423	22.31	Sharabanna	Ind	8,071	12.48	6,352
Bangalore	44	Ramanagaram	74.96	Hanumanthiah	INC	16,640	59.19	Ramaiah	KMPP	7,937	28.23	8,703
Bangalore	45	Kankanahalli	60.45	Thimmegowda	INC	16,888	55.07	Linge Gowda	KMPP	13,778	44.93	3,110
Bangalore	46	Virupakshipura	58.50	Kariappa	INC	12,979	57.09	Channappa	KMPP	9,756	42.91	3,223
Bangalore	47	Channapatna	74.19	V. Venkatappa	INC	14,741	52.44	Puttaramaiah	KMPP	13,369	47.56	1,372
Mandya	48	Malavalli	47.70	Nagaraja Murthy	KMPP	18,314	25.04	Veerappa	INC	18,144	24.81	170
Mandya	49	Malavalli	47.70	Chikkalingaiah	SCF	13,339	18.24	—				—
Mandya	50	Maddur	67.34	Veeranna Gowda	INC	16,724	66.61	Malliah	KMPP	8,385	33.39	8,339
Mandya	51	Mandya	60.05	Shankare Gowda	INC	12,980	50.68	Chikkalingiah	KMPP	6,727	26.27	6,253
Mandya	52	Srirangapatna	55.10	K. Puttaswamy	INC	12,581	61.47	Chunche Gowda	Ind	7,886	38.53	4,695
Mandya	53	Pandavapura	53.87	Neelegowda	INC	7,116	34.87	Channaiah	KMPP	5,407	26.49	1,709
Mandya	54	Nagamangala	57.49	Shankaralinge Gowda	Ind	14,908	55.58	Singarigowda	INC	11,914	44.42	2,994
Mandya	55	Krishnarajpete	51.16	Lingappa	INC	11,258	43.17	Kempegowda	Ind	7,552	28.96	3,706
Mysore	56	Mysore City North	54.26	T. Mariappa	INC	12,307	51.24	Mohammad Sheriff	Ind	8,466	35.25	3,841
Mysore	57	Mysore City South	46.35	Narayanaswamy	INC	6,391	30.60	Raghavaraju	Ind	3,645	17.45	2,746
Mysore	58	Mysore Taluk	36.96	Shivananje Gowda	INC	4,883	32.88	Mahadeva Swamy	Ind	2,776	18.69	2,107
Mysore	59	Nanjangud	34.43	Linganna	Ind	11,122	20.94	Aradhya	Ind	10,778	20.29	344
Mysore	60	Nanjangud	34.43	Madaiah	INC	6,930	13.05	—				—
Mysore	61	T Narsipur	65.68	S. Srinivasa Iyengar	KMPP	10,057	37.69	Boriah	INC	8,607	32.26	1,450
Mysore	62	Yelandur	36.45	M. Rajasekara Murthy	Ind	9,872	15.68	Venkataranga Naika	Ind	8,932	14.19	940
Mysore	63	Yelandur	36.45	B. Rachaiah	KMPP	6,726	10.68	—				—
Mysore	64	Chamarajanagar	50.48	U. M. Madappa	KMPP	7,509	43.68	Basappa	Ind	5,263	30.62	2,246
Mysore	65	Hunasuru	44.83	D. Devaraj Urs	INC	6,216	36.76	Mari Gowda	Ind	2,726	16.12	3,490
Mysore	66	Gundlupet Heggadadevanakote	50.47	Shivarudrappa	Ind	18,469	23.32	Adbul Gafoor Khan	Ind	15,360	19.40	3,109
Mysore	67	Gundlupet Heggadadevanakote	50.47	H. Siddaiah	Ind	12,608	15.92	—				—
Mysore	68	Krishnarajanagar	58.59	Thammaiya	Ind	7,820	34.95	Nanjaraja Urs	INC	6,056	27.06	1,764
Mysore	69	Periyapatna	64.37	Mariyappa	Ind	12,447	51.10	Channabasappa	INC	11,913	48.90	534
Hassan	70	Holenarasipur	55.38	Ramachandra Rao	INC	12,515	60.76	Veerappa	SP	4,643	22.54	7,872
Hassan	71	Arkalgud	56.53	Thimmappa Gowda	INC	13,087	61.60	Keshava Murthy	KMPP	8,158	38.40	4,929
Hassan	72	Channarayapatna	60.40	Lakkappa	INC	10,723	46.85	Narasimhe Gowda	KMPP	7,828	34.20	2,895
Hassan	73	Javagal	42.87	Chikkanna	INC	12,296	73.13	Range Gowda	Ind	4,518	26.87	7,778
Hassan	74	Arsikere	45.67	Panchaksharaiah	INC	8,631	46.23	Bommanna	KMPP	8,348	44.71	283
Hassan	75	Hassan	44.95	Kari Gowda	INC	12,878	69.42	Jagadeesh	SP	4,827	26.02	8,051
Hassan	76	Belur	49.84	H. K. Siddaiah	INC	28,761	35.63	Dharmappa	KMPP	19,754	24.47	9,007
Hassan	77	Belur	49.84	B. N. Boranna Gowda	INC	25,516	31.61	Veerabhadraiah	KMPP	6,691	8.29	18,825
Chikmagalur	78	Chikmagalur Mudigere	29.83	B. L. Subbamma	INC	14,167	30.06	Lakshmana Gowda	SP	6,647	14.10	7,520
Chikmagalur	79	Chikmagalur Mudigere	29.83	G. Puttaswamy	INC	13,561	28.77	Govinda Gowda	BJS	5,255	11.15	8,306
Chikmagalur	80	Kadur	62.62	Chandrasekaraiah	INC	9,799	44.80	Mudiyappa	Ind	5,144	23.52	4,655
Chikmagalur	81	Bhadravati	49.67	Madhavachar	INC	10,241	50.69	Ramachandra Setty	SP	5,119	25.34	5,122
Shimoga and Chikmagalur	82	Tirthahalli Koppa	70.48	Kadidal Manjappa	INC	16,570	59.55	Ramakrishna Rao	BJS	7,552	27.14	9,018
Shimoga	83	Tarikere	65.19	T. Nagappa	KMPP	8,093	32.14	Basappa	INC	8,059	32.01	34
Shimoga	84	Shimoga	53.55	S. R. Nagappa Setty	INC	10,069	46.38	Maheswarappa	SP	4,203	19.36	5,866
Shimoga	85	Channagiri	78.45	L. Siddappa	KMPP	17,297	51.29	Kundur Rudrappa	INC	16,430	48.71	867
Shimoga	86	Honnali	74.06	H. S. Rudrappa	INC	16,848	58.07	Patnasetra Murigeppa	Ind	12,164	41.93	4,684
Shimoga	87	Soraba Shikaripur	65.29	H. Siddaiah	INC	20,737	21.37	Halanaik	SP	12,938	13.33	7,799
Shimoga	88	Soraba Shikaripur	65.29	Ganganayak	INC	19,519	20.12	Mariyappa	SP	12,846	13.24	6,673
Shimoga	89	Sagar Hosanagar	65.43	Gopala Gowda	SP	13,722	54.44	Badri Narayan	INC	11,485	45.56	2,237
Chitradurga	90	Harihar	63.76	H. Siddhaveerappa	INC	12,760	51.45	Ramappa	SP	9,162	36.95	3,598
Chitradurga	91	Davanagere	54.11	Ballari Siddamma	INC	13,802	60.13	Bondade Hanumantha Rao	Ind	3,508	15.28	10,294
Chitradurga	92	Hosadurga	59.64	G. Basappa	INC	11,552	48.27	Channaiah Odeyar	Ind	7,608	31.79	3,944
Chitradurga	93	Molakalmuru	68.83	A. Bhimappa Naik	INC	15,444	55.86	Basanna	Ind	12,203	44.14	3,241
Chitradurga	94	Hiriyur	55.89	V. Masiyappa	INC	23,841	28.14	Kenchappa	Ind	15,018	17.72	8,823
Chitradurga	95	Hiriyur	55.89	T. Hanumiah	INC	21,100	24.90	Siddappa	Ind	10,742	12.68	10,358
Chitradurga	96	Chitradurga	58.39	Mulka Govinda Reddy	SP	11,498	43.12	Ranga Rao	INC	10,836	40.64	662
Chitradurga	97	Holalkere	55.78	G. Duggappa	INC	24,024	26.44	Hanumanthappa	Ind	11,425	12.58	12,599
Chitradurga	98	Holalkere	55.78	G. Sivappa	INC	20,671	22.75	Male Siddappa	Ind	10,478	11.53	10,193
Chitradurga	99	Jagalur	66.22	J. Mohamed Imamsab	KMPP	14,123	56.80	Kallappa	INC	10,741	43.20	3,382

== State reorganization ==
On 1 November 1956, Mysore State was enlarged by the addition of Coorg State, the Kollegal taluk of the Coimbatore district and the South Kanara district (except the Kasaragod taluk) of Madras State, the districts of Raichur and Gulbarga from western Hyderabad State and the Kannada speaking districts of Dharwar, Bijapur, North Kanara, and Belgaum, (except the Chandgad taluk of Belgaum district) from southern Bombay State under States Reorganisation Act, 1956. The Siruguppa taluk, the Bellary taluk, the Hospet taluk, and a small area of the Mallapuram sub-taluk were detached from the Mysore State. This resulted in an increase in assembly constituencies from 80 with 99 seats to 179 with 208 seats in the 1957 assembly elections.

== See also ==
- Mysore State
- 1951–52 elections in India
- 1957 Mysore Legislative Assembly election
