= St. John's Hill Assembly constituency =

Former constituency in Karnataka, India

Coordinates: 12.991731°N 77.613025°E

St. John's Hill
- Former constituency for the State Legislative Assembly

Constituency details
- Country: India
- State: Mysore
- District: Bangalore
- Lok Sabha constituency: Bangalore North
- Established: 1951
- Abolished: 1956

St. John's Hill Assembly constituency was one of the legislative assembly seats in the state assembly of Mysore, in India. It was part of Bangalore North Lok Sabha constituency.

== Members of the Legislative Assembly ==
Election	Member	Party
1952	V. M. Mascarenhas	Indian National Congress

== Election results ==
=== 1952 ===
1952 Mysore Legislative Assembly election : St. John's Hill
Party	Candidate	Votes	%	±%
INC	V. M. Mascarenhas	7,870	42.62%	New
Independent	Syed Abdur Rahman	4,745	25.70%	New
Independent	M. A. Amalorpavam	2,383	12.91%	New
KMPP	C. R. Nagappa	1,547	8.38%	New
Socialist Party (India)	M. A. H. Siddiqui	1,018	5.51%	New
CPI	I. Maridas	902	4.88%	New
Margin of victory		3,125	16.92%	
Turnout		18,465	45.46%	
Total valid votes		18,465		
Registered electors		40,616		
INC win (new seat)				
