= Y. Ramakrishna =

Indian politician

Cabinet Minister for Parliamentary Affairs, Government of Karnataka
- In office 1980–1983
- Constituency: Anekal

Cabinet Minister of Health, Government of Karnataka
- In office 1968–1971

Minister of State, Government of Karnataka
- In office 1967–1968

Member of Parliament for Kolar
- In office 1989–1991
- Preceded by: V. Venkatesh
- Succeeded by: K. H. Muniyappa

Member of the Karnataka Legislative Assembly for Anekal
- In office 1978–1985
- Preceded by: M. B. Ramaswamy
- Succeeded by: M. P. Keshavamurthy
- In office 1994–1997
- Preceded by: M. P. Keshavamurthy
- Succeeded by: A. Narayanaswamy

Member of the Karnataka Legislative Assembly for Uttarahalli
- In office 1967–1972
- Preceded by: J. Srinivasa Reddy
- Succeeded by: B. Basavalingappa

Member of the Karnataka Legislative Assembly for Yelahanka
- In office 1962–1967
- Preceded by: Position Established
- Succeeded by: B. Narayanaswamappa

Member of the Karnataka Legislative Assembly for Bangalore North
- In office 1957–1962
- Preceded by: R . Munisamaiah
- Succeeded by: Position Abolished

Personal details
- Born: 1 July 1927 Bangalore, India
- Died: 24 May 1997 (aged 69) Bangalore, India
- Party: Bharatiya Janata Party (1993 - 1997)
- Other political affiliations: Indian National Congress (till 1971) and (1980 - 1993), Indian National Congress (Organisation) (1971 - 1977), Janata Party (1977 - 1980)
- Spouse: Puttalakshmamma
- Children: 2 Daughters and 4 Sons
- Parent: Yellappa (father)
- Occupation: Advocate, Politician

Y. Ramakrishna (1 July 1927 – 24 May 1997) was an Indian politician, advocate, agriculturist and freedom fighter.

== See also ==
- Indian Independence Activists
