= Virupakshipura Assembly constituency =

Former constituency in Karnataka, India

Coordinates: 12.580051°N 77.230528°E

Virupakshipura
- Former constituency for the State Legislative Assembly

Constituency details
- Country: India
- State: Mysore State
- District: Bengaluru
- Lok Sabha constituency: Bengaluru
- Established: 1951
- Abolished: 1967
- Reservation: None

Virupakshipura Assembly constituency was one of the Vidhana Sabha constituenies in the state assembly of Mysore State, in India. It was part of Bangalore Lok Sabha constituency.

== Members of the Legislative Assembly ==
Election	Member	Party
1952	S. Kariappa	Indian National Congress
1957	S. Kariappa	Indian National Congress
1962	K. L. Shivalinge Gowda	Indian National Congress

== Election results ==
=== Assembly Election 1962 ===
1962 Mysore State Legislative Assembly election : Virupakshipura
Party	Candidate	Votes	%	±%
INC	K. L. Shivalinge Gowda	19,666	55.36%	▼3.05
Independent	B. Sidde Gowda	15,860	44.64%	New
Margin of victory		3,806	10.71%	▼6.10
Turnout		37,188	76.33%	▲16.20
Total valid votes		35,526		
Registered electors		48,720		▲10.51
INC hold		Swing	▼3.05	

=== Assembly Election 1957 ===
1957 Mysore State Legislative Assembly election : Virupakshipura
Party	Candidate	Votes	%	±%
INC	S. Kariappa	15,484	58.41%	▲1.32
PSP	B. L. Channe Gowda	11,027	41.59%	New
Margin of victory		4,457	16.81%	▲2.63
Turnout		26,511	60.13%	▲1.63
Total valid votes		26,511		
Registered electors		44,088		▲13.44
INC hold		Swing	▲1.32	

=== Assembly Election 1952 ===
1952 Mysore State Legislative Assembly election : Virupakshipura
Party	Candidate	Votes	%	±%
INC	S. Kariappa	12,979	57.09%	New
KMPP	B. L. Channappa	9,756	42.91%	New
Margin of victory		3,223	14.18%	
Turnout		22,735	58.50%	
Total valid votes		22,735		
Registered electors		38,865		
INC win (new seat)				
