= M. Krishnappa (politician, born 1962) =

Indian politician

Member of the Karnataka Legislative Assembly
- Incumbent
- Assumed office 2008
- Preceded by: Constituency established
- Constituency: Bangalore South

Personal details
- Born: 1 June 1962 (age 63); Bengaluru
- Political party: Bharatiya Janata Party
- Parent: Muniswamappa (father)

M Krishnappa is an Indian politician from the state of Karnataka.

== Personal life ==
He is the son of Late Muniswamappa. He did schooling in JSS High School and later passed PUC (Class 12). His wife is an Industrialist. He is a Wildlife conservation activist and adopted an elephant and a tigress at Bannerghatta National Park.

== Career ==
Krishnappa began his political career in 1983 helping with his brother's campaign and was first elected in the 2005 Zilla Panchayat elections for a tenure of one year from Uttarahalli, which was still not part of the Greater Bengaluru. During this tenure he became a Counselling Member for Uttarahalli govt school betterment committee. In 2011 he became the Deputy Chairman of BMTC and was still in the post till 2013. The PUC pass MLA states his occupation as entrepreneur of cottage industries.

In 2008 he was elected as Member of Karnataka Legislative Assembly for the first time from Bangalore South Constituency. He is serving as MLA for Third Consecutive Term from Bangalore South Assembly Constituency after winning the seat in 2013 and 2018 elections.

== Controversies ==
On 9 December 2014, Lokayukta Justice Y Bhaskar Rao upheld the declared that allegations against him were substantiated in denotification case and should not continue to hold his post. However, on 11 December 2014 Governor Vajubhai Rudabhai Vala rejected the Lokayukta order to dismiss the MLA from his duties later on.
