= Bangalore North Assembly constituency =

Former constituency in Karnataka, India

Coordinates: 13.104163°N 77.574101°E

Bangalore North
- Former constituency for the State Legislative Assembly

Constituency details
- Country: India
- State: Mysore State
- District: Bangalore
- Lok Sabha constituency: Kolar
- Established: 1951
- Abolished: 1962
- Reservation: SC

Bangalore North Assembly constituency was one of the Vidhana Sabha seats in the state assembly of Mysore, in India. It was part of Kolar Lok Sabha constituency.

== Members of the Legislative Assembly ==
Election	Member	Party
1952	K. V. Byregowda	Indian National Congress
1952	R. Munisamaiah	Indian National Congress
1957	K. V. Byregowda	Indian National Congress
1957	Y. Ramakrishna	Indian National Congress

== Election results ==
=== Assembly Election 1957 ===
1957 Mysore State Legislative Assembly election : Bangalore North
Party	Candidate	Votes	%	±%
INC	K. V. Byregowda	13,462	24.47%	▼25.93
Independent	B. M. Anjanappa	11,128	20.22%	New
INC	Y. Ramakrishna	10,199	18.54%	▼31.86
Independent	P. Kustibasappa	9,159	16.65%	New
CPI	Anandu	4,747	8.63%	New
CPI	M. S. Krishnan	4,353	7.91%	New
Independent	Anjanappa	1,975	3.59%	New
Margin of victory		2,334	4.24%	▼13.52
Turnout		55,023	34.46%	▼24.17
Total valid votes		55,023		
Registered electors		75,461		▼21.46
INC hold		Swing	▼2.49	

=== Assembly Election 1952 ===
1952 Mysore State Legislative Assembly election : Bangalore North
Party	Candidate	Votes	%	±%
INC	K. V. Byregowda	15,189	26.96%	New
INC	R. Munisamaiah	13,203	23.44%	New
Independent	K. Veeranna	5,186	9.21%	New
Socialist	K. S. Mune Gowda	5,041	8.95%	New
Independent	B. Rangaswami	4,709	8.36%	New
KMPP	V. Chickyellappa	3,117	5.53%	New
ABJS	S. Srinivas	2,497	4.43%	New
SCF	P. Parthasarathi	2,249	3.99%	New
Independent	Bachappa	1,777	3.15%	New
Margin of victory		10,003	17.76%	
Turnout		56,338	29.32%	
Total valid votes		56,338		
Registered electors		96,085		
INC win (new seat)				
