= Sidlaghatta-Chikballapur Assembly constituency =

Former constituency in Karnataka, India

Coordinates: 13.417837°N 77.797330°E

Sidlaghatta Chikballapur
- Former constituency for the State Legislative Assembly

Constituency details
- Country: India
- State: Mysore State
- District: Bangalore
- Lok Sabha constituency: Kolar
- Established: 1951
- Abolished: 1957

Sidlaghatta Chikballapur Assembly constituency was one of the Vidhana Sabha constituencies in the state assembly of Mysore, in India. It was part of Kolar Lok Sabha constituency.

== Members of the Legislative Assembly ==
| Election | Member | Party |
|---|---|---|
| 1952 | G. Papanna | Indian National Congress |
| 1952 | A. Muniyappa | Indian National Congress |

== Election results ==
=== Assembly Election 1952 ===
1952 Mysore State Legislative Assembly election : Sidlaghatta-Chikballapur
| Party | Candidate | Votes | % | ±% |
|---|---|---|---|---|
| INC | G. Papanna | 22,982 | 26.80% | New |
| INC | A. Muniyappa | 22,666 | 26.43% | New |
| Independent | C. V. Venkatarayappa | 19,082 | 22.25% | New |
| Independent | Bandi Muneppa | 17,009 | 19.84% | New |
| Independent | Channarayappa | 4,013 | 4.68% | New |
| Margin of victory | | 3,900 | 4.55% | |
| Turnout | | 85,752 | 48.47% | |
| Total valid votes | | 85,752 | | |
| Registered electors | | 88,459 | | |
| INC win (new seat) | | | | |
