= Kallambella Assembly constituency =

Former Assembly constituency in Karnataka, India

Coordinates: 13.629°N 76.920°E

Kallambella
- Former constituency for the Karnataka Legislative Assembly

Constituency details
- Country: India
- Region: South India
- State: Karnataka
- Division: Bangalore
- District: Tumkur
- Lok Sabha constituency: Chitradurga
- Established: 1967
- Abolished: 2008

Kallambella Assembly constituency was one of the constituencies in Karnataka state assembly in India until 2008 when it was made defunct. It was part of Chitradurga Lok Sabha constituency.

== Members of the Legislative Assembly ==
Election	Member	Party
1967	B. Ganganna	Indian National Congress
1972	T. Taregowda	Indian National Congress
1978	T. B. Jayachandra	Indian National Congress
1983	B. Ganganna	Janata Party
1985	B. L. Gowda	Janata Party
1986 By-election	B. Ganganna	Janata Party
1989	T. B. Jayachandra	Independent politician
1994	T. B. Jayachandra	Indian National Congress
1999	T. B. Jayachandra	Indian National Congress
2004	K. S. Kiran Kumar	Bharatiya Janata Party

== Election results ==
=== Assembly Election 2004 ===
2004 Karnataka Legislative Assembly election : Kallambella
Party	Candidate	Votes	%	±%
BJP	K. S. Kiran Kumar	50,108	47.19%	▲6.90
INC	T. B. Jayachandra	32,873	30.96%	▼17.00
JD(S)	K. L. Mahadevappa	19,105	17.99%	▲11.64
JP	Jagadeesh. B. R	1,383	1.30%	New
Independent	Nagaraju. M	1,078	1.02%	New
Urs Samyuktha Paksha	Gangadharaiah. D. K	843	0.79%	New
Kannada Nadu Party	Kalavathi Alias Shashikala	799	0.75%	New
Margin of victory		17,235	16.23%	▲8.56
Turnout		106,249	76.74%	▲0.36
Total valid votes		106,189		
Registered electors		138,461		▲8.73
BJP gain from INC		Swing	▼0.77	

=== Assembly Election 1999 ===
1999 Karnataka Legislative Assembly election : Kallambella
Party	Candidate	Votes	%	±%
INC	T. B. Jayachandra	44,480	47.96%	▲15.77
BJP	K. S. Kiran Kumar	37,365	40.29%	▲17.80
JD(S)	K. L. Mahadevappa	5,887	6.35%	New
JD(U)	B. G. Gopalakrishna	3,538	3.81%	New
Independent	Muralidhara	915	0.99%	New
Margin of victory		7,115	7.67%	▼1.93
Turnout		97,268	76.38%	▼0.14
Total valid votes		92,748		
Rejected ballots		4,414	4.54%	▲2.82
Registered electors		127,349		▲7.31
INC hold		Swing	▲15.77	

=== Assembly Election 1994 ===
1994 Karnataka Legislative Assembly election : Kallambella
Party	Candidate	Votes	%	±%
INC	T. B. Jayachandra	28,729	32.19%	▲15.25
JD	B. Ganganna	20,158	22.59%	▲3.89
BJP	K. S. Kiran Kumar	20,070	22.49%	New
INC	S. Lingaiah	16,812	18.84%	New
KRRS	Dhananjayaradhya	1,862	2.09%	New
Independent	N. G. Shivanna	914	1.02%	New
Margin of victory		8,571	9.60%	▼21.93
Turnout		90,814	76.52%	▲3.76
Total valid votes		89,250		
Rejected ballots		1,564	1.72%	▼5.69
Registered electors		118,679		▲6.13
INC gain from Independent		Swing	▼18.04	

=== Assembly Election 1989 ===
1989 Karnataka Legislative Assembly election : Kallambella
Party	Candidate	Votes	%	±%
Independent	T. B. Jayachandra	37,844	50.23%	New
JD	B. Ganganna	14,089	18.70%	New
INC	K. Mallanna	12,763	16.94%	▼11.75
JP	Jayaram	9,466	12.57%	New
Kranti Sabha	D. Ranganatha Gowda	552	0.73%	New
Margin of victory		23,755	31.53%	▲15.42
Turnout		81,366	72.76%	
Total valid votes		75,336		
Rejected ballots		6,030	7.41%	
Registered electors		111,823		
Independent gain from JP		Swing	▲5.43	

=== Assembly By-election 1986 ===
1986 Karnataka Legislative Assembly by-election : Kallambella
Party	Candidate	Votes	%	±%
JP	B. Ganganna	28,814	44.80%	▼10.40
INC	S. Hanumanthaiah	18,452	28.69%	▼9.99
Independent	S. Lingaiah	11,136	17.31%	New
Independent	S. G. Ramalingaiah	3,415	5.31%	New
Independent	B. M. Chandranna	941	1.46%	New
Independent	K. Kantharaju	761	1.18%	New
Margin of victory		10,362	16.11%	▼0.41
Total valid votes		64,318		
JP hold		Swing	▼10.40	

=== Assembly Election 1985 ===
1985 Karnataka Legislative Assembly election : Kallambella
Party	Candidate	Votes	%	±%
JP	B. L. Gowda	36,027	55.20%	▲1.38
INC	S. Lingaiah	25,244	38.68%	▼3.19
LKD	H. N. Bhasmangi Rudraiah	2,462	3.77%	▲0.13
BJP	G. Srinvasa Murthy	630	0.97%	New
Margin of victory		10,783	16.52%	▲4.57
Turnout		66,326	72.58%	▼0.59
Total valid votes		65,272		
Rejected ballots		1,054	1.59%	▼0.29
Registered electors		91,388		▲14.03
JP hold		Swing	▲1.38	

=== Assembly Election 1983 ===
1983 Karnataka Legislative Assembly election : Kallambella
Party	Candidate	Votes	%	±%
JP	B. Ganganna	30,969	53.82%	▲15.84
INC	T. B. Jayachandra	24,094	41.87%	▲36.28
LKD	Basappa. C. R	2,094	3.64%	New
INC(J)	Jayanna. S. K	385	0.67%	New
Margin of victory		6,875	11.95%	▼3.01
Turnout		58,643	73.17%	▼1.52
Total valid votes		57,542		
Rejected ballots		1,101	1.88%	▼1.54
Registered electors		80,142		▲10.70
JP gain from INC(I)		Swing	▲0.89	

=== Assembly Election 1978 ===
1978 Karnataka Legislative Assembly election : Kallambella
Party	Candidate	Votes	%	±%
INC(I)	T. B. Jayachandra	27,645	52.93%	New
JP	B. Ganganna	19,833	37.98%	New
INC	C. J. Mukkannappa	2,918	5.59%	▼38.16
Independent	D. M. Ramachandra Setty	662	1.27%	New
Independent	B. P. Ganganna	584	1.12%	New
Independent	M. D. Mahalingaiah	584	1.12%	New
Margin of victory		7,812	14.96%	▼9.37
Turnout		54,074	74.69%	▲10.24
Total valid votes		52,226		
Rejected ballots		1,848	3.42%	▲3.42
Registered electors		72,398		▲11.42
INC(I) gain from INC		Swing	▲9.18	

=== Assembly Election 1972 ===
1972 Mysore State Legislative Assembly election : Kallambella
Party	Candidate	Votes	%	±%
INC	T. Taregowda	17,862	43.75%	▼5.94
Independent	B. Ganganna	7,929	19.42%	New
Independent	S. Doddananjappa	7,151	17.51%	New
Independent	S. R. Muddarangappa	4,311	10.56%	New
INC(O)	Tmn Rangappa	3,579	8.77%	New
Margin of victory		9,933	24.33%	▼0.49
Turnout		41,882	64.45%	▲3.13
Total valid votes		40,832		
Registered electors		64,980		▲14.48
INC hold		Swing	▼5.94	

=== Assembly Election 1967 ===
1967 Mysore State Legislative Assembly election : Kallambella
Party	Candidate	Votes	%	±%
INC	B. Ganganna	16,176	49.69%	New
Independent	G. Marulappa	8,095	24.87%	New
Independent	H. P. Mruthunjaya Aradhya	4,721	14.50%	New
CPI(M)	H. C. Channappa	3,561	10.94%	New
Margin of victory		8,081	24.82%	
Turnout		34,809	61.32%	
Total valid votes		32,553		
Registered electors		56,763		
INC win (new seat)				

== See also ==
- List of constituencies of the Karnataka Legislative Assembly
