= K. Y. Nanjegowda =

Indian politician (born 1962)

K. Y. Nanjegowda (born 1 April 1962) is an Indian politician from Karnataka. He is a member of the Karnataka Legislative Assembly from Malur Assembly constituency in Kolar district. He represents Indian National Congress and won the 2023 Karnataka Legislative Assembly election.

== Early life and education ==
Nanjegowda is from Malur, Kolar district, Karnataka. His late father Yalle Gowda was a farmer. His wife Rathnamma Nanjegowda was a former president of Kolar Zilla Panchayat. He passed Class 8 in 1981 from Tekal Government High School and discontinued his studies during Class 9.

== Career ==
Nanjegowda won from Malur Assembly constituency representing Indian National Congress in the 2023 Karnataka Legislative Assembly election. He polled 50,955 votes and defeated his nearest rival, K. S. Manjunatha Gowda of Bharatiya Janata Party by a narrow margin of 248 votes. Earlier, he won the 2018 Karnataka Legislative Assembly election from Malur representing Congress. He polled 75,677 votes and defeated his nearest rival, K. S. Manjunath Gowda of BJP, by a margin of 17,915 votes.

In January 2024, his house was raided by Enforcement Directorate officials under Prevention of Money Laundering Act, in connection with alleged irregularities in recruitment at Kolar Chikkaballapur Milk Union, where he was the president. The MLA denied the charges.
