= Solur Assembly constituency =

Former constituency in Mysore state, India

Coordinates: 13.071°N 77.244°E

Solur
- Former constituency for the State Legislative Assembly

Constituency details
- Country: India
- State: Mysore State
- District: Bengaluru
- Lok Sabha constituency: Tumkur
- Established: 1957
- Abolished: 1967
- Reservation: None

Solur Assembly constituency was one of the vidhana sabha constituencies in the state assembly of Mysore State, in India. It was part of Tumkur Lok Sabha constituency.

== Members of the Legislative Assembly ==
Election	Member	Party
1962	Alur Hanumanthappa	Indian National Congress

== Election results ==
=== Assembly Election 1962 ===
1962 Mysore State Legislative Assembly election : Solur
Party	Candidate	Votes	%	±%
INC	Alur Hanumanthappa	12,858	44.06%	New
PSP	K. V. Nanjappa	8,346	28.60%	New
Independent	T. V. Hanumantharaju	4,856	16.64%	New
Independent	M. Revanna	3,124	10.70%	New
Margin of victory		4,512	15.46%	
Turnout		30,677	66.62%	
Total valid votes		29,184		
Registered electors		46,050		
INC win (new seat)				
