= Cubbonpet Assembly constituency =

Former constituency in Karnataka, India

Coordinates: 12.969272°N 77.583949°E

Cubbonpet
- Former constituency for the State Legislative Assembly

Constituency details
- Country: India
- State: Mysore State
- District: Bangalore
- Lok Sabha constituency: Bangalore City
- Established: 1951
- Abolished: 1967
- Reservation: None

Cubbonpet Assembly constituency was one of the vidhana sabha constituencies in the state assembly of Mysore, in India. It was part of Bangalore City Lok Sabha constituency.

== Members of the Legislative Assembly ==
| Election | Member | Party |
|---|---|---|
| 1952 | B. M. Seenappa | Indian National Congress |
| 1957 | V. P. Deenadayalu Naidu | Indian National Congress |
| 1962 | B. Nanjappa | Independent politician |

== Election results ==
=== Assembly Election 1962 ===
1962 Mysore State Legislative Assembly election : Cubbonpet
| Party | Candidate | Votes | % | ±% |
|---|---|---|---|---|
| Independent | B. Nanjappa | 18,750 | 66.03% | New |
| INC | V. P. Deenadayalu Naidu | 6,874 | 24.21% | ▼27.74 |
| SWA | G. Mathias | 1,942 | 6.84% | New |
| PSP | A. K. Anatha Krishna | 541 | 1.91% | New |
| ABJS | Allamplli Venkataram | 183 | 0.64% | New |
| Margin of victory | | 11,876 | 41.82% | ▲37.93 |
| Turnout | | 29,366 | 67.95% | ▲21.38 |
| Total valid votes | | 28,398 | | |
| Registered electors | | 43,217 | | ▲8.95 |
| Independent gain from INC | | Swing | ▲14.08 | |

=== Assembly Election 1957 ===
1957 Mysore State Legislative Assembly election : Cubbonpet
| Party | Candidate | Votes | % | ±% |
|---|---|---|---|---|
| INC | V. P. Deenadayalu Naidu | 9,596 | 51.95% | ▲14.95 |
| Independent | B. Nanjappa | 8,877 | 48.05% | New |
| Margin of victory | | 719 | 3.89% | ▼13.62 |
| Turnout | | 18,473 | 46.57% | ▼6.09 |
| Total valid votes | | 18,473 | | |
| Registered electors | | 39,665 | | ▼6.04 |
| INC hold | | Swing | ▲14.95 | |

=== Assembly Election 1952 ===
1952 Mysore State Legislative Assembly election : Cubbonpet
| Party | Candidate | Votes | % | ±% |
|---|---|---|---|---|
| INC | B. M. Seenappa | 8,226 | 37.00% | New |
| KMPP | K. M. Naganna | 4,334 | 19.50% | New |
| Independent | P. D. Narayan | 4,188 | 18.84% | New |
| Independent | Hamida Habibulla | 3,303 | 14.86% | New |
| ABJS | S. M. Munbivenkatappa | 2,179 | 9.80% | New |
| Margin of victory | | 3,892 | 17.51% | |
| Turnout | | 22,230 | 52.66% | |
| Total valid votes | | 22,230 | | |
| Registered electors | | 42,213 | | |
| INC win (new seat) | | | | |
