= Huliyurdurga Assembly constituency =

Former Assembly constituency in Karnataka, India

Coordinates: 12.828261°N 77.033901°E

Huliyurdurga
- Former constituency for the Karnataka Legislative Assembly

Constituency details
- Country: India
- Region: South India
- State: Karnataka
- Division: Bangalore
- District: Tumkur
- Lok Sabha constituency: Tumkur
- Established: 1967
- Abolished: 2008
- Reservation: None

Huliyurdurga Assembly constituency was one of the constituencies in Karnataka state assembly in India until 2008 when it was made defunct. It was part of Tumkur Lok Sabha constituency.

== Members of the Legislative Assembly ==
Election	Member	Party
1952	N. Huchamasti Gowda	Indian National Congress
1967	N. Huchamasti Gowda	Independent politician
1972	N. Huchamasti Gowda	Indian National Congress
1978	D. T. Mayanna	Janata Party
1983	N. Huchamasti Gowda	Independent politician
1985	D. Nagarajaiah	Janata Party
1989	N. Huchamasti Gowda	Indian National Congress
1994	D. Nagarajaiah	Janata Dal
1999	Y. K. Ramaiah	Indian National Congress
2004	D. Nagarajaya	Janata Dal

== Election results ==
=== Assembly Election 2004 ===
2004 Karnataka Legislative Assembly election : Huliyurdurga
Party	Candidate	Votes	%	±%
JD(S)	Nagarajaya. D	27,848	32.71%	▼0.15
BJP	Anusuyamma	23,106	27.14%	▲20.22
INC	B. B. Ramaswamy Gowda	22,001	25.84%	▼34.01
JP	Shreeramachandra Prasad	9,348	10.98%	New
BSP	Shivashankara	942	1.11%	New
Kannada Nadu Party	Manjunatha. H	594	0.70%	New
Independent	Ramakrishna. K. K	577	0.68%	New
Margin of victory		4,742	5.57%	▼21.42
Turnout		85,199	67.46%	▼5.31
Total valid votes		85,129		
Registered electors		126,297		▲11.16
JD(S) gain from INC		Swing	▼27.14	

=== Assembly Election 1999 ===
1999 Karnataka Legislative Assembly election : Huliyurdurga
Party	Candidate	Votes	%	±%
INC	Y. K. Ramaiah	47,824	59.85%	▲31.51
JD(S)	D. Nagarajaiah	26,259	32.86%	New
BJP	K. B. Boregowda	5,530	6.92%	▼2.46
Margin of victory		21,565	26.99%	▲3.88
Turnout		82,681	72.77%	▼1.05
Total valid votes		79,913		
Rejected ballots		2,630	3.18%	▲1.65
Registered electors		113,616		▲1.13
INC gain from JD		Swing	▲8.40	

=== Assembly Election 1994 ===
1994 Karnataka Legislative Assembly election : Huliyurdurga
Party	Candidate	Votes	%	±%
JD	D. Nagarajaiah	41,993	51.45%	▲45.70
INC	Ramachandra Prasad	23,128	28.34%	▼15.37
BJP	K. B. Boregowda	7,656	9.38%	New
SP	S. P. Rudraiah	4,295	5.26%	New
INC	H. B. Basavaraju	2,488	3.05%	New
Independent	S. K. Mariyappa	1,842	2.26%	New
Margin of victory		18,865	23.11%	▲22.14
Turnout		82,935	73.82%	▼2.12
Total valid votes		81,619		
Rejected ballots		1,270	1.53%	▼3.26
Registered electors		112,349		▲10.02
JD gain from INC		Swing	▲7.74	

=== Assembly Election 1989 ===
1989 Karnataka Legislative Assembly election : Huliyurdurga
Party	Candidate	Votes	%	±%
INC	N. Huchamasti Gowda	32,272	43.71%	▲1.36
JP	D. Nagarajaiah	31,553	42.74%	New
JD	H. B. Hanumaiah	4,246	5.75%	New
Independent	B. B. Ramaswamy Gowda	3,468	4.70%	New
Independent	J. T. Ramachandra	577	0.78%	New
Margin of victory		719	0.97%	▼12.88
Turnout		77,548	75.94%	▼3.05
Total valid votes		73,832		
Rejected ballots		3,716	4.79%	▲3.36
Registered electors		102,118		▲22.64
INC gain from JP		Swing	▼12.49	

=== Assembly Election 1985 ===
1985 Karnataka Legislative Assembly election : Huliyurdurga
Party	Candidate	Votes	%	±%
JP	D. Nagarajaiah	36,434	56.20%	▲27.59
INC	N. Huchamasti Gowda	27,454	42.35%	▲12.09
Independent	P. L. Shivalingaiah	810	1.25%	New
Margin of victory		8,980	13.85%	▲5.37
Turnout		65,774	78.99%	▲2.63
Total valid votes		64,834		
Rejected ballots		940	1.43%	▼0.40
Registered electors		83,265		▲13.28
JP gain from Independent		Swing	▲17.47	

=== Assembly Election 1983 ===
1983 Karnataka Legislative Assembly election : Huliyurdurga
Party	Candidate	Votes	%	±%
Independent	N. Huchamasti Gowda	21,342	38.73%	New
INC	H. Boregowda	16,671	30.26%	▲11.67
JP	D. Nagaraju	15,765	28.61%	▼19.05
Independent	Durgada Rajegowda	727	1.32%	New
Independent	P. L. Shivalingaiah	596	1.08%	New
Margin of victory		4,671	8.48%	▼9.50
Turnout		56,131	76.36%	▼2.69
Total valid votes		55,101		
Rejected ballots		1,030	1.83%	▼0.49
Registered electors		73,506		▲8.00
Independent gain from JP		Swing	▼8.93	

=== Assembly Election 1978 ===
1978 Karnataka Legislative Assembly election : Huliyurdurga
Party	Candidate	Votes	%	±%
JP	D. T. Mayanna	25,045	47.66%	New
INC(I)	H. Boregowda	15,595	29.67%	New
INC	N. Huchamasti Gowda	9,772	18.59%	▼51.40
Independent	Durgada Rajegowda	2,142	4.08%	New
Margin of victory		9,450	17.98%	▼22.01
Turnout		53,802	79.05%	▲12.42
Total valid votes		52,554		
Rejected ballots		1,248	2.32%	▲2.32
Registered electors		68,063		▲12.32
JP gain from INC		Swing	▼22.33	

=== Assembly Election 1972 ===
1972 Mysore State Legislative Assembly election : Huliyurdurga
Party	Candidate	Votes	%	±%
INC	N. Huchamasti Gowda	27,591	69.99%	▲25.14
INC(O)	D. T. Mayanna	11,828	30.01%	New
Margin of victory		15,763	39.99%	▲39.76
Turnout		40,376	66.63%	▼2.02
Total valid votes		39,419		
Registered electors		60,596		▲16.29
INC gain from Independent		Swing	▲24.91	

=== Assembly Election 1967 ===
1967 Mysore State Legislative Assembly election : Huliyurdurga
Party	Candidate	Votes	%	±%
Independent	N. Huchamasti Gowda	15,126	45.08%	New
INC	D. T. Mayanna	15,050	44.85%	▼16.43
Independent	Y. K. Ramaiah	3,379	10.07%	New
Margin of victory		76	0.23%	▼36.87
Turnout		35,771	68.65%	▲11.13
Total valid votes		33,555		
Registered electors		52,107		▲23.57
Independent gain from INC		Swing	▼16.20	

=== Assembly Election 1952 ===
1952 Mysore State Legislative Assembly election : Huliyurdurga
Party	Candidate	Votes	%	±%
INC	N. Huchamasti Gowda	14,863	61.28%	New
KMPP	Revanna Gowda	5,864	24.18%	New
Socialist Party (India)	Timmegowda	3,529	14.55%	New
Margin of victory		8,999	37.10%	
Turnout		24,256	57.52%	
Total valid votes		24,256		
Registered electors		42,169		
INC win (new seat)				

== See also ==
- List of constituencies of the Karnataka Legislative Assembly
