= Bangalore South Assembly constituency =

Vidhana Sabha constituency in Karnataka, India

Coordinates: 12.86°N 77.58°E

Bangalore South
- Constituency No. 176 for the Karnataka Legislative Assembly

Constituency details
- Country: India
- Region: South India
- State: Karnataka
- Division: Bangalore
- District: Bangalore Urban
- Lok Sabha constituency: Bangalore Rural
- Established: 1951 (first establishment); 2008 (second establishment)
- Total electors: 695,797 (2023)
- Reservation: None

Member of Legislative Assembly
- 16th Karnataka Legislative Assembly
- Incumbent M. Krishnappa
- Party: BJP
- Elected year: 2023

Bangalore South Assembly constituency is one of the seats in the Karnataka Legislative Assembly in India. It is part of Bangalore Rural Lok Sabha constituency. Notably, Bangalore South Lok Sabha constituency does not contain Bangalore South Assembly constituency.

Bangalore South Assembly seat was created for the second time when the delimitation of seats was carried out in 2008. While there are four Lok Sabha seats with the name of the city 'Bangalore' in their title, Bangalore South is the only Assembly seat among dozens in the city boundary which has the word 'Bangalore' in its title.

== Members of the Legislative Assembly ==
Election	Member	Party
1952	A. V. Narasimha Reddy	Indian National Congress
1952	B. T. Kempa Raj	Indian National Congress
1957	R. Rangappa Reddy	Independent politician
1957	A. V. Narasimha Reddy	Indian National Congress
1962	D. Munichinnappa	Independent politician
2008	M. Krishnappa	Bharatiya Janata Party
2013	M. Krishnappa	Bharatiya Janata Party
2018	M. Krishnappa	Bharatiya Janata Party
2023	M. Krishnappa	Bharatiya Janata Party

== Election results ==
=== Assembly Election 2023 ===
2023 Karnataka Legislative Assembly election : Bangalore South
Party	Candidate	Votes	%	±%
BJP	M. Krishnappa	196,220	51.35%	▲3.61
INC	R. K. Ramesh	146,521	38.35%	▲0.11
JD(S)	H. P. Rajagopala Reddy	24,612	6.44%	▼4.88
UPP	Manu. M. M	4,360	1.14%	New
NOTA	None of the above	4,006	1.05%	▼0.19
AAP	Ashok Mruthyunjaya	2,585	0.68%	New
Margin of victory		49,699	13.01%	▲3.50
Turnout		382,161	54.92%	▲2.06
Total valid votes		382,112		
Registered electors		695,797		▲15.21
BJP hold		Swing	▲3.61	

=== Assembly Election 2018 ===
2018 Karnataka Legislative Assembly election : Bangalore South
Party	Candidate	Votes	%	±%
BJP	M. Krishnappa	152,427	47.74%	▼7.07
INC	R. K. Ramesh	122,068	38.24%	▲4.00
JD(S)	R. Prabhakara Reddy	36,138	11.32%	▼27.32
NOTA	None of the above	3,952	1.24%	New
Margin of victory		30,359	9.51%	▼6.67
Turnout		319,270	52.86%	▼3.17
Total valid votes		319,255		
Registered electors		603,939		▲34.94
BJP hold		Swing	▼7.07	

=== Assembly Election 2013 ===
2013 Karnataka Legislative Assembly election : Bangalore South
Party	Candidate	Votes	%	±%
BJP	M. Krishnappa	102,207	54.81%	▲12.24
JD(S)	R. Prabhakara Reddy	72,045	38.64%	▲18.57
INC	Dr. Tejaswini Gowda	63,849	34.24%	▲12.11
KJP	Jagadish Reddy	3,936	2.11%	New
Independent	Murali Mohan	1,975	1.06%	New
Margin of victory		30,162	16.18%	▼4.25
Turnout		250,782	56.03%	▲12.04
Total valid votes		186,461		
Registered electors		447,562		▲17.82
BJP hold		Swing	▲12.24	

=== Assembly Election 2008 ===
2008 Karnataka Legislative Assembly election : Bangalore South
Party	Candidate	Votes	%	±%
BJP	M. Krishnappa	71,114	42.57%	New
INC	Sadananda. M	36,979	22.13%	▼12.80
JD(S)	C. Manjunath	33,529	20.07%	New
Independent	H. P. Rajagopala Reddy	17,726	10.61%	New
BSP	R. Manjunath	2,300	1.38%	New
Independent	A. Somashekar	1,755	1.05%	New
Independent	N. S. Ravichandra	1,494	0.89%	New
Margin of victory		34,135	20.43%	▲2.57
Turnout		167,106	43.99%	▼18.29
Total valid votes		167,068		
Registered electors		379,873		▲560.96
BJP gain from Independent		Swing	▼10.22	

=== Assembly Election 1962 ===
1962 Mysore State Legislative Assembly election : Bangalore South
Party	Candidate	Votes	%	±%
Independent	D. Munichinnappa	17,441	52.79%	New
INC	B. Basavalingappa	11,540	34.93%	▼10.29
SWA	K. Chikkanna	2,561	7.75%	New
PSP	M. Narayanappa	1,494	4.52%	▼0.01
Margin of victory		5,901	17.86%	▲15.54
Turnout		35,793	62.28%	▲27.59
Total valid votes		33,036		
Registered electors		57,473		▼30.83
Independent gain from INC		Swing	▲29.02	

=== Assembly Election 1957 ===
1957 Mysore State Legislative Assembly election : Bangalore South
Party	Candidate	Votes	%	±%
INC	A. V. Narasimha Reddy	13,702	23.77%	▼16.31
Independent	R. Rangappa Reddy	13,452	23.33%	New
INC	B. Basavalingappa	12,365	21.45%	▼18.63
Independent	B. T. Kempa Raj	5,449	9.45%	New
Independent	C. Basaviah	5,333	9.25%	New
PSP	Shivarudrappa	2,610	4.53%	New
CPI	Krishnama Raju	2,509	4.35%	New
Independent	P. S. Chinnappa	2,229	3.87%	New
Margin of victory		1,337	2.32%	▼4.64
Turnout		57,649	34.69%	▼24.80
Total valid votes		57,649		
Registered electors		83,089		▲8.73
INC hold		Swing	▲2.57	

=== Assembly Election 1952 ===
1952 Mysore State Legislative Assembly election : Bangalore South
Party	Candidate	Votes	%	±%
INC	A. V. Narasimha Reddy	9,637	21.20%	New
INC	B. T. Kempa Raj	8,586	18.89%	New
Independent	S. A. Narayana Reddy	6,471	14.23%	New
Independent	Nilgiri. G. Sanjeevaiah	5,377	11.83%	New
Socialist	R. Rama Reddy	4,714	10.37%	New
KMPP	B. M. Krishna Murthy	3,647	8.02%	New
KMPP	S. S. Pillai	2,376	5.23%	New
Independent	H. Nanjappa	2,022	4.45%	New
Independent	Mylarappa	1,317	2.90%	New
Margin of victory		3,166	6.96%	
Turnout		45,462	29.74%	
Total valid votes		45,462		
Registered electors		76,420		
INC win (new seat)				

== See also ==
- List of constituencies of the Karnataka Legislative Assembly
