= K. L. Shivalinge Gowda =

Indian politician (1926–2019)

Member of the Legislative Assembly
- In office 1978–1983
- Preceded by: Puttadasa H
- Succeeded by: K. G. Srinivasa Murthy
- Constituency: Sathanur

Member of the Legislative Assembly
- In office 1985–1989
- Preceded by: H. D. Deve Gowda
- Succeeded by: D. K. Shivakumar
- Constituency: Sathanur

Member of the Legislative Assembly
- In office 1962–1967
- Preceded by: S Kariappa
- Succeeded by: Position Abolished
- Constituency: Virupakshipura

Personal details
- Born: K. L. Shivalinge Gowda; 30 June 1926 Kanakapura, Mysore State (now Karnataka), India
- Died: 6 July 2019 (aged 93) Bangalore, India
- Party: Janata Dal (Secular) (1999–2019)
- Other political affiliations: Indian National Congress (till 1977); Janata Party (1977–1988) Janata Dal (1988–1999)

K. L. Shivalinge Gowda (30 June 1926 – 6 July 2019) was an Indian politician from the state of Karnataka. He was a member of the Janata Party (JP), and was member of the Legislative Assembly from Sathanur in 1978 and from Virupakshipura constituency in 1962 as an independent.
