= Sagar Hosanagar Assembly constituency =

Former constituency in Karnataka, India

Coordinates: 14.034777°N 75.123108°E

Sagar Hosanagar
- Former constituency for the State Legislative Assembly

Constituency details
- Country: India
- State: Mysore State
- Division: Bangalore
- District: Shimoga
- Lok Sabha constituency: Shimoga
- Established: 1951
- Abolished: 1957
- Reservation: None

Sagar Hosanagar Assembly constituency was one of the Vidhan Sabha constituencies in the state assembly of Mysore, in India. It was part of Shimoga Lok Sabha constituency.

== Members of the Legislative Assembly ==
Election	Member	Party
1952	Shantaveri Gopala Gowda	Socialist Party

== Election results ==
=== Assembly Election 1952 ===
1952 Mysore State Legislative Assembly election : Sagar Hosanagar
Party	Candidate	Votes	%	±%
Socialist Party (India)	Shantaveri Gopala Gowda	13,722	54.44%	New
INC	A. R. Badri Narayan	11,485	45.56%	New
Margin of victory		2,237	8.87%	
Turnout		25,207	65.43%	
Total valid votes		25,207		
Registered electors		38,527		
Socialist Party (India) win (new seat)				
