= Javagal Assembly constituency =

Former constituency in Karnataka, India

Coordinates: 13.298213°N 76.059379°E

Javagal
- Former constituency for the State Legislative Assembly

Constituency details
- Country: India
- State: Mysore State
- District: Hassan
- Lok Sabha constituency: Hassan Chickmagalur
- Established: 1951
- Abolished: 1957

Javagal Assembly constituency was one of the Vidhan Sabha constituencies in the state assembly of Mysore, in India. It was part of Hassan Chickmagalur.

== Members of the Legislative Assembly ==
Election	Member	Party
1952	B. Chikkanna	Indian National Congress

== Election results ==
=== Assembly Election 1952 ===
1952 Mysore State Legislative Assembly election : Javagal
Party	Candidate	Votes	%	±%
INC	B. Chikkanna	12,296	73.13%	New
Independent	Range Gowda	4,518	26.87%	New
Margin of victory		7,778	46.26%	
Turnout		16,814	42.87%	
Total valid votes		16,814		
Registered electors		39,218		
INC win (new seat)				
