= Malur Assembly constituency =

Legislative Assembly constituency in Karnataka, India

Coordinates: 13.00°N 77.94°E

Malur
- Constituency No. 149 for the Karnataka Legislative Assembly

Constituency details
- Country: India
- Region: South India
- State: Karnataka
- Division: Bangalore
- District: Kolar
- Lok Sabha constituency: Kolar
- Established: 1951
- Total electors: 192,717 (2023)
- Reservation: None

Member of Legislative Assembly
- 16th Karnataka Legislative Assembly
- Incumbent K. Y. Nanje Gowda
- Party: Indian National Congress
- Alliance: INDIA
- Elected year: 2023
- Preceded by: K. S. Manjunath Gowda

Malur Assembly constituency is one of the 224 constituencies in the Karnataka Legislative Assembly of Karnataka, a southern state of India. It is also part of Kolar Lok Sabha constituency.

== Members of the Legislative Assembly ==
Election	Member	Party
1952	H. C. Linga Reddy	Indian National Congress
1957	H. C. Linga Reddy	Indian National Congress
1962	S. V. Rame Gowda	Independent politician
1967	H. C. Linga Reddy	Indian National Congress
1972	A. V. Muniswamy	Indian National Congress
1978	P. N. Reddy	Indian National Congress
1983	A. Nagaraju	Indian National Congress
1985	H. B. Dyavarappa	Janata Party
1989	A. Nagaraju	Indian National Congress
1994	H. B. Dyavarappa	Janata Dal
1999	A. Nagaraju	Indian National Congress
2004	S. N. Krishnaiah Shetty	Bharatiya Janata Party
2008	S. N. Krishnaiah Shetty	Bharatiya Janata Party
2013	K. S. Manjunathagowda	Janata Dal
2018	K. Y. Nanjegowda	Indian National Congress
2023	K. Y. Nanjegowda	Indian National Congress

== Election results ==
=== Assembly Election 2023 ===
2023 Karnataka Legislative Assembly election : Malur
Party	Candidate	Votes	%	±%
INC	K. Y. Nanjegowda	50,955	29.40%	▼17.50
BJP	K. S. Manjunathagowda	50,707	29.26%	▲14.46
Independent	Hoodi Vijayakumar	49,362	28.48%	New
JD(S)	G. E. Ramegowda	17,627	10.17%	▼25.63
Independent	M. Vijaya Kumar	1,370	0.79%	New
NOTA	None of the above	647	0.37%	▼0.06
Margin of victory		248	0.14%	▼10.96
Turnout		173,489	90.02%	▲0.91
Total valid votes		173,292		
Registered electors		192,717		▲6.41
INC hold		Swing	▼17.50	

=== Assembly Election 2018 ===
2018 Karnataka Legislative Assembly election : Malur
Party	Candidate	Votes	%	±%
INC	K. Y. Nanjegowda	75,677	46.90%	▲36.62
JD(S)	K. S. Manjunathagowda	57,762	35.80%	▲6.41
BJP	Es. En. Krisshnaiah Setty Malur	23,889	14.80%	New
Indian New Congress Party	K. Gopalappa	1,291	0.80%	New
NOTA	None of the above	696	0.43%	New
Margin of victory		17,915	11.10%	▲1.53
Turnout		161,385	89.11%	▲1.74
Total valid votes		161,362		
Registered electors		181,112		▲10.51
INC gain from JD(S)		Swing	▲17.51	

=== Assembly Election 2013 ===
2013 Karnataka Legislative Assembly election : Malur
Party	Candidate	Votes	%	±%
JD(S)	K. S. Manjunathagowda	57,645	29.39%	▲7.63
Independent	Krisshnaiah Setty Es. En. Maluru	38,876	19.82%	New
INC	Channa Keshava	20,159	10.28%	▲2.29
Independent	G. E. Ramegowda	19,480	9.93%	New
Independent	S. R. Krishnaiah Shetty	1,283	0.65%	New
Margin of victory		18,769	9.57%	▼34.50
Turnout		143,182	87.37%	▲5.56
Total valid votes		196,147		
Registered electors		163,889		▲12.70
JD(S) gain from BJP		Swing	▼36.44	

=== Assembly Election 2008 ===
2008 Karnataka Legislative Assembly election : Malur
Party	Candidate	Votes	%	±%
BJP	S. N. Krishnaiah Shetty	78,280	65.83%	▲6.39
JD(S)	R. Prabhakar	25,879	21.76%	▲20.50
INC	J. Krishna Singh	9,496	7.99%	▼28.36
BSP	Dr. R. S. Kumar	1,571	1.32%	▲0.29
Independent	A. Nagaraju	1,049	0.88%	New
Independent	S. N. Prabhakar	837	0.70%	New
Independent	T. Munirajappa	778	0.65%	New
Margin of victory		52,401	44.07%	▲20.97
Turnout		118,958	81.81%	▲4.54
Total valid votes		118,914		
Registered electors		145,415		▼3.38
BJP hold		Swing	▲6.39	

=== Assembly Election 2004 ===
2004 Karnataka Legislative Assembly election : Malur
Party	Candidate	Votes	%	±%
BJP	Krishnaiah Shetty. H. M	69,120	59.44%	▲46.64
INC	A. Nagaraju	42,264	36.35%	▼16.78
JD(S)	Mohammad Anvar	1,468	1.26%	New
BSP	Krishnappa. J	1,199	1.03%	New
JP	Nagaraj. K. A	1,068	0.92%	New
Margin of victory		26,856	23.10%	▲4.04
Turnout		116,291	77.27%	▼1.20
Total valid votes		116,281		
Registered electors		150,495		▲11.08
BJP gain from INC		Swing	▲6.31	

=== Assembly Election 1999 ===
1999 Karnataka Legislative Assembly election : Malur
Party	Candidate	Votes	%	±%
INC	A. Nagaraju	53,762	53.13%	▲13.93
Independent	S. N. Ragunatha	34,474	34.07%	New
BJP	S. R. Krishnaiah Shetty	12,954	12.80%	▲7.47
Margin of victory		19,288	19.06%	▲15.23
Turnout		106,314	78.47%	▼0.78
Total valid votes		101,190		
Rejected ballots		5,069	4.77%	▲3.29
Registered electors		135,481		▲11.33
INC gain from JD		Swing	▲10.10	

=== Assembly Election 1994 ===
1994 Karnataka Legislative Assembly election : Malur
Party	Candidate	Votes	%	±%
JD	H. B. Dyavarappa	40,828	43.03%	▲20.96
INC	A. Nagaraju	37,194	39.20%	▼14.22
Independent	S. R. Krishnaiah Shetty	9,015	9.50%	New
BJP	S. Rajagopala Gowda	5,055	5.33%	New
INC	C. Lakshminarayana	1,824	1.92%	New
Margin of victory		3,634	3.83%	▼27.52
Turnout		96,448	79.25%	▲1.07
Total valid votes		94,876		
Rejected ballots		1,429	1.48%	▼1.92
Registered electors		121,697		▲14.74
JD gain from INC		Swing	▼10.39	

=== Assembly Election 1989 ===
1989 Karnataka Legislative Assembly election : Malur
Party	Candidate	Votes	%	±%
INC	A. Nagaraju	42,788	53.42%	▲7.43
JD	B. M. Krishnappa	17,680	22.07%	New
JP	H. B. Dyavarappa	15,924	19.88%	New
Independent	P. N. Reddy	2,772	3.46%	New
Margin of victory		25,108	31.35%	▲24.93
Turnout		82,916	78.18%	▲3.47
Total valid votes		80,099		
Rejected ballots		2,817	3.40%	▲1.89
Registered electors		106,063		▲25.24
INC gain from JP		Swing	▲1.00	

=== Assembly Election 1985 ===
1985 Karnataka Legislative Assembly election : Malur
Party	Candidate	Votes	%	±%
JP	H. B. Dyavarappa	32,663	52.42%	▲40.50
INC	A. Nagaraju	28,660	45.99%	▲2.87
Independent	V. Rajasekar Kasave	720	1.16%	New
Margin of victory		4,003	6.42%	▼3.06
Turnout		63,269	74.71%	▲3.63
Total valid votes		62,316		
Rejected ballots		953	1.51%	▼0.50
Registered electors		84,689		▲8.83
JP gain from INC		Swing	▲9.30	

=== Assembly Election 1983 ===
1983 Karnataka Legislative Assembly election : Malur
Party	Candidate	Votes	%	±%
INC	A. Nagaraju	23,371	43.12%	▲19.56
Independent	H. B. Dyavarappa	18,235	33.64%	New
JP	Narayanaswamy. B. A	6,459	11.92%	▼16.59
Independent	Krishnaswamy. H. V	5,495	10.14%	New
Margin of victory		5,136	9.48%	▼7.38
Turnout		55,312	71.08%	▼3.86
Total valid votes		54,202		
Rejected ballots		1,110	2.01%	▼0.43
Registered electors		77,818		▲9.11
INC gain from INC(I)		Swing	▼2.25	

=== Assembly Election 1978 ===
1978 Karnataka Legislative Assembly election : Malur
Party	Candidate	Votes	%	±%
INC(I)	P. N. Reddy	23,656	45.37%	New
JP	Lakshmidevi Ramanna	14,866	28.51%	New
INC	A. V. Muniswamy	12,282	23.56%	▼34.74
Independent	K. N. Nanjunda Rao	838	1.61%	New
Margin of victory		8,790	16.86%	▼2.86
Turnout		53,446	74.94%	▲10.38
Total valid votes		52,141		
Rejected ballots		1,305	2.44%	▲2.44
Registered electors		71,318		▲11.08
INC(I) gain from INC		Swing	▼12.93	

=== Assembly Election 1972 ===
1972 Mysore State Legislative Assembly election : Malur
Party	Candidate	Votes	%	±%
INC	A. V. Muniswamy	23,581	58.30%	▼12.95
Independent	H. C. Linga Reddy	15,605	38.58%	New
INC(O)	Narayanaswamy. B. A	1,039	2.57%	New
Margin of victory		7,976	19.72%	▼28.92
Turnout		41,452	64.56%	▼4.44
Total valid votes		40,451		
Registered electors		64,202		▲14.79
INC hold		Swing	▼12.95	

=== Assembly Election 1967 ===
1967 Mysore State Legislative Assembly election : Malur
Party	Candidate	Votes	%	±%
INC	H. C. L. Reddy	26,284	71.25%	▲24.31
Independent	M. R. Ramanna	8,340	22.61%	New
Independent	B. Ramappa	1,854	5.03%	New
Independent	K. Krishnappa	411	1.11%	New
Margin of victory		17,944	48.64%	▲44.42
Turnout		38,593	69.00%	▲1.35
Total valid votes		36,889		
Registered electors		55,928		▲6.64
INC gain from Independent		Swing	▲20.10	

=== Assembly Election 1962 ===
1962 Mysore State Legislative Assembly election : Malur
Party	Candidate	Votes	%	±%
Independent	S. V. Rame Gowda	17,135	51.15%	New
INC	H. C. Linga Reddy	15,723	46.94%	▼8.49
RPI	R. Vinodha Doss	639	1.91%	New
Margin of victory		1,412	4.22%	▼6.64
Turnout		35,479	67.65%	▲25.02
Total valid votes		33,497		
Registered electors		52,444		▲18.13
Independent gain from INC		Swing	▼4.28	

=== Assembly Election 1957 ===
1957 Mysore State Legislative Assembly election : Malur
Party	Candidate	Votes	%	±%
INC	H. C. Linga Reddy	10,490	55.43%	▲13.19
Independent	M. A. Krishnappa	8,434	44.57%	New
Margin of victory		2,056	10.86%	▼1.30
Turnout		18,924	42.63%	▲5.71
Total valid votes		18,924		
Registered electors		44,396		▲5.54
INC hold		Swing	▲13.19	

=== Assembly Election 1952 ===
1952 Mysore State Legislative Assembly election : Malur
Party	Candidate	Votes	%	±%
INC	H. C. Linga Reddy	6,560	42.24%	New
Independent	C. H. Venkataramanappa	4,672	30.08%	New
Independent	T. Venkatappa	2,543	16.37%	New
Independent	C. B. Venkatarame Gowda	919	5.92%	New
Socialist Party (India)	T. Narayanaswamy	837	5.39%	New
Margin of victory		1,888	12.16%	
Turnout		15,531	36.92%	
Total valid votes		15,531		
Registered electors		42,066		
INC win (new seat)				

== See also ==
- Kolar district
- List of constituencies of the Karnataka Legislative Assembly
