= Mulbagal Srinivasapur Assembly constituency =

Former constituency in Karnataka, India

Coordinates: 13.163811°N 78.393653°E

Mulbagal Srinivasapur
- Former constituency for the State Legislative Assembly

Constituency details
- Country: India
- State: Mysore State
- District: Kolar
- Lok Sabha constituency: Kolar
- Established: 1951
- Abolished: 1957

Mulbagal Srinivasapur Assembly constituency was one of the Vidhan Sabha seats in the state assembly of Mysore, in India. It was part of Kolar Lok Sabha constituency.

== Members of the Legislative Assembly ==
Year	Reservation	Member	Party
1952	General	G. Narayana Gowda	Indian National Congress
1952	SC	T. Channaiah	Indian National Congress
1957 onwards: Seat does not exist. See Mulbagal

== Election results ==
=== 1952 ===
1952 Mysore Legislative Assembly election: Malbagal Srinivasapur
Party	Candidate	Votes	%	±%
INC	T. Channiah			
INC	G. Narayana Gowda	21,225	52.33	
Independent	B. L. Narayana Swamy	13789	34.00	
Independent	G. K. Venkataramaiah	5545	13.67	
Turnout		40559	47.34	
