= Yelandur Assembly constituency =

Former Assembly constituency in Karnataka, India

Coordinates: 12.048406°N 77.029845°E

Yelandur
- Former constituency for the State Legislative Assembly

Constituency details
- Country: India
- State: Mysore State
- Division: Mysore
- District: Mysore
- Lok Sabha constituency: Mysore
- Established: 1951
- Abolished: 1957

Yelandur Assembly constituency was one of the constituencies of Karnataka Legislative Assemblies or Vidhan Sabha constituencies in Mysore State. It was part of Mysore Lok Sabha constituency.

== Members of the Legislative Assembly ==
Year	Member	Reservation	Party
1952	General	M. Rajasekara Murthy	Independent politician
1952	SC	B. Rachaiah	Kisan Mazdoor Praja Party
1957 onwards: Seat does not exist. See Kollegal, T. Narasipur and Chamarajanagar

== Election results ==
=== Assembly Election 1952 ===
1952 Mysore State Legislative Assembly election : Yelandur
Party	Candidate	Votes	%	±%
Independent	M. Rajasekara Murthy	9,872	15.68%	New
Independent	R. Venkataranga Naika	8,932	14.19%	New
INC	M. C. Sivananda Sharma	7,710	12.25%	New
KMPP	B. Rachaiah	6,726	10.68%	New
Independent	Kothagala Putta Mallappa	5,627	8.94%	New
INC	C. H. Basavaiah	5,286	8.40%	New
KMPP	K. M. Battappa	5,044	8.01%	New
Socialist	L. Venkatanaranappa	3,723	5.91%	New
Independent	K. V. Veeranna	3,479	5.53%	New
Margin of victory		940	1.49%	
Turnout		62,963	36.45%	
Total valid votes		62,963		
Registered electors		86,361		
Independent win (new seat)				

== See also ==
- Kollegal Assembly constituency
- T. Narasipur Assembly constituency
- Chamarajanagar Assembly constituency
