= Kora Assembly constituency =

Former constituency in Karnataka, India

Coordinates: 13.437041°N 77.062890°E

Kora
- Former constituency for the State Legislative Assembly

Constituency details
- Country: India
- State: Mysore State
- District: Tumkur
- Lok Sabha constituency: Tumkur and Tiptur
- Established: 1951
- Abolished: 1957

Kora Assembly constituency was one of the Vidhan Sabha constituencies in the state assembly of Mysore, in India. It was part of Tumkur and Tiptur Lok Sabha constituencies.

== Members of the Legislative Assembly ==
Election	Member	Party
1952	B. C. Nanjundaiah	Indian National Congress

== Election results ==
=== Assembly Election 1952 ===
1952 Mysore State Legislative Assembly election : Kora
Party	Candidate	Votes	%	±%
INC	B. C. Nanjundaiah	9,553	44.19%	New
Independent	Sette Gowda	4,138	19.14%	New
Socialist Party (India)	R. S. Siddaramaiah	3,622	16.75%	New
ABJS	Pujari Boraiah	1,921	8.89%	New
Independent	Muddarangappa	1,683	7.79%	New
Independent	B. S. Nanjappa	701	3.24%	New
Margin of victory		5,415	25.05%	
Turnout		21,618	51.50%	
Total valid votes		21,618		
Registered electors		41,973		
INC win (new seat)				
