= Koratagere-Madhugiri Assembly constituency =

Former constituency in Karnataka, India

Coordinates: 13.593957°N 77.235629°E

Koratagere-Madhugiri
- Former constituency for the State Legislative Assembly

Constituency details
- Country: India
- State: Mysore State
- District: Tumkur
- Lok Sabha constituency: Kolar
- Established: 1951
- Abolished: 1957

Koratagere-Madhugiri Assembly constituency was one of the Vidhan Sabha constituencies in the state assembly of Mysore, in India. It was part of Kolar Lok Sabha constituency.

== Members of the Legislative Assembly ==
Election	Member	Party
1952	R. Chennigaramiah	Indian National Congress
1952	Mudduramaiah	Indian National Congress

== Election results ==
=== Assembly Election 1952 ===
1952 Mysore State Legislative Assembly election : Koratagere-Madhugiri
Party	Candidate	Votes	%	±%
INC	R. Chennigaramiah	17,590	22.08%	New
INC	Mudduramaiah	16,067	20.17%	New
Independent	C. J. Mukkannappa	10,257	12.88%	New
Socialist	K. Bhimaiah	8,163	10.25%	New
Socialist	T. S. Sivanna	7,986	10.03%	New
Independent	H. R. Nanjappa	6,477	8.13%	New
KMPP	S. Hanumanthaiah	4,959	6.23%	New
KMPP	V. P. Nabhirajaiah	4,742	5.95%	New
Independent	K. Sreenivasaiah	3,416	4.29%	New
Margin of victory		7,333	9.21%	
Turnout		79,657	48.30%	
Total valid votes		79,657		
Registered electors		82,467		
INC win (new seat)				
