= Thimmanahalli =

Thimmanahalli Kaayi Thimmanahalli
- Village
- Location in Karnataka, India Thimmanahalli (India)
- Coordinates: 13.542395°N 76.661300°E
- Country: India
- State: Karnataka
- District: Tumkur
- Elevation: 822 m (2,697 ft)

Population (2001)
  - Total: 6,000

Languages
  - Official: Kannada
- Time zone: UTC+5:30 (IST)
- PIN: 572228
- Telephone code: 08133
- Vehicle registration: KA-44 and KA-06

Thimmanahalli is a village in Chikkanayakanahalli, a town in Tumkur District. Its estimated population is about 5500-6000. Thimmanahalli is also known as Kaayi Thimmanahalli.

== History ==
In 18th century, Thimmarasu Nayaka built fort at the site & established it as a province of the empire. The remnants of Fort could be found adjacent to Bandi-Mane (Bandimane) near Eshwar Temple. The prime crops that are grown in Thimmanahalli are coconut's Araca nut, paddy & ragi. It is famous for coconuts and sometimes referred to as Kaayi Thimmanahalli.

== Religion ==
The residents of Thimmanahalli are primarily Hindu, Muslim, and Christian and the village is home to Temples, a Mosque and a Church.

== See also ==
- Hagalavadi
- Bukkapatna
