= S. V. Rame Gowda =

Indian politician

SV Rame Gowda
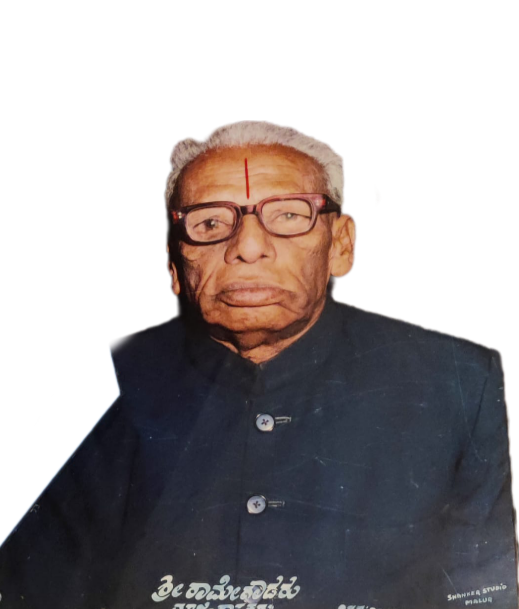

Member of the Legislative Assembly
- In office 1962–1967
- Constituency: Malur

Personal details
- Born: 1914 Santhehalli, Malur, Kolar district, Kingdom of Mysore
- Citizenship: India
- Party: Independent

Santhehalli Venkataswamy Gowda Rame Gowda (born in 1914) was an Indian politician and a former Independent MLA in Mysore State who represented Malur from 1962 to 1967.

== Personal life ==
SV Rame Gowda was born in 1914 at Santhehalli village in the Kingdom of Mysore. He completed his schooling from National High School, Bangalore and then worked as an agriculturist, Bricks and tiles industries. Father Venkataswamy Gowda, mother Muninanjamma, Grand father Ramegowda and grand mother Dodda Lakshmamma, Great grand father Venkataramana Gowda(Kartha of Hindu Undivided family). Spouse Lakshmi Devamma. He had 2 sons. First son Ashwathnarayana Gowda(former Mandal Parishad President), second son Venkataswamy Gowda. Ashwathnarayana Gowda had four sons namely Sathish Kumar, Suresh Kumar, Sarvesh Kumar and S A Ramesh Kumar (current member of Grama Panchayat)

== Political career ==
SV Rame Gowda was a member of the Taluk Congress Committee and Kolar District Board from 1943 to 1950. In 1962, he contested and won as an independent in the Mysore state legislative assembly elections, from Malur, serving as an MLA until 1967. He is the only Independent MLA in the electoral history of Malur.

He was the director of the Malur Taluk Milk Producers' Co-operative Society. He served as the chairman of Santhehalli village panchayat, and both a member and standing committee member of Malur Taluk Board. He later became director of Land Mortgage Society, Malur and director of Sheep Breeders' Association, Kolar.
