= Chikmagalur Mudigere Assembly constituency =

Former Assembly constituency in Karnataka, India

Coordinates: 13.269217°N 75.715025°E

Chikmagalur Mudigere
- Former constituency for the State Legislative Assembly

Constituency details
- Country: India
- State: Mysore state
- Division: Mysore
- District: Chikmaglur
- Lok Sabha constituency: Hassan Chickmagalur
- Established: 1951
- Abolished: 1957

Chikmagalur Mudigere Assembly constituency was one of the Karnataka Legislative Assemblies or Vidhan Sabha constituencies in Mysore State. It was part of Hassan Chickmagalur Lok Sabha constituency.

== Members of the Legislative Assembly ==
Election	Member	Party
1952	B. L. Subbamma	Indian National Congress
1952	G. Puttaswamy	Indian National Congress

== Election results ==
=== Assembly Election 1952 ===
1952 Mysore State Legislative Assembly election : Chikmagalur Mudigere
Party	Candidate	Votes	%	±%
INC	B. L. Subbamma	14,167	30.06%	New
INC	G. Puttaswamy	13,561	28.77%	New
Socialist	Lakshmana Gowda	6,647	14.10%	New
ABJS	N. P. Govinda Gowda	5,255	11.15%	New
Independent	H. M. Rudrappa Sastry	4,808	10.20%	New
ABJS	B. N. Linganna	2,697	5.72%	New
Margin of victory		7,520	15.95%	
Turnout		47,135	29.83%	
Total valid votes		47,135		
Registered electors		79,007		
INC win (new seat)				

== See also ==
- Chikmagalur Assembly constituency
- Mudigere Assembly constituency
- Kadur Assembly constituency
