= Gundlupet Heggadadevanakote Assembly constituency =

Former Assembly constituency in Karnataka, India

Coordinates: 11.943363°N 76.485988°E

Gundlupet Heggadadevanakote
- Former constituency for the State Legislative Assembly

Constituency details
- Country: India
- State: Mysore State
- Division: Mysore
- District: Mysore
- Lok Sabha constituency: Mysore
- Established: 1951
- Abolished: 1957

Gundlupet Heggadadevanakote Assembly constituency was one of the Karnataka Legislative Assemblies or Vidhan Sabha constituencies in Mysore State. It was part of Mysore Lok Sabha constituency.

== Members of the Legislative Assembly ==
Election	Member	Party
1952	H. K. Shivarudrappa	Independent politician
1952	Siddiah Alias Kunniah	Independent politician

== Election results ==
=== Assembly Election 1952 ===
1952 Mysore State Legislative Assembly election : Gundlupet Heggadadevanakote
Party	Candidate	Votes	%	±%
Independent	H. K. Shivarudrappa	18,469	23.32%	New
Independent	G. A. Adbul Gafoor Khan	15,360	19.40%	New
INC	M. D. Shivappa	12,726	16.07%	New
Independent	Siddiah Alias Kunniah	12,608	15.92%	New
Independent	K. Lingappa	10,274	12.97%	New
INC	P. Venkataramana	9,747	12.31%	New
Margin of victory		3,109	3.93%	
Turnout		79,184	50.47%	
Total valid votes		79,184		
Registered electors		78,454		
Independent win (new seat)				

== See also ==
- Hunasuru Assembly constituency
- Gundlupet Assembly constituency
- Heggadadevankote Assembly constituency
