= Bagepalli Gudibande Assembly constituency =

Former constituency in Karnataka, India

Coordinates: 13.724413°N 77.741653°E

Bagepalli Gudibanda
- Former constituency for the State Legislative Assembly

Constituency details
- Country: India
- State: Mysore State
- District: Kolar
- Lok Sabha constituency: Kolar
- Established: 1951
- Abolished: 1955
- Total electors: 41,672
- Reservation: None

Bagepalli Gudibanda Assembly constituency was one of the Vidhana Sabha seats in the state assembly of Mysore, in India. It was part of Kolar Lok Sabha constituency.

== Members of the Legislative Assembly ==
Election	Member	Party
1952	B. V. Narayana Reddy	Socialist Party
1957 onwards: Seat does not exist. See Chikballapur

== Election results ==
=== Assembly Election 1952 ===
1952 Mysore State Legislative Assembly election : Bagepalli Gudibande
Party	Candidate	Votes	%	±%
Socialist Party (India)	B. V. Narayana Reddy	13,446	54.35%	New
INC	H. Suryanarayana Joshi	5,538	22.39%	New
Independent	Appasami Reddy	3,921	15.85%	New
Independent	Gudibanda Rama Rao	1,834	7.41%	New
Margin of victory		7,908	31.97%	
Turnout		24,739	59.37%	
Total valid votes		24,739		
Registered electors		41,672		
Socialist Party (India) win (new seat)				
