= Channarayapatna Assembly constituency =

Former constituency in Mysore state, India

Coordinates: 12.857°N 76.489°E

Channarayapatna
- Former constituency for the State Legislative Assembly

Constituency details
- Country: India
- State: Mysore State
- Division: Mysore
- District: Hassan
- Lok Sabha constituency: Hassan
- Established: 1951
- Abolished: 1957

Channarayapatna Assembly constituency was one of the Vidhan Sabha constituencies in the state assembly of Mysore State, in India. It was part of Hassan Lok Sabha constituency.

== Members of the Legislative Assembly ==
Election	Member	Party
1952	K. Lakkappa	Indian National Congress

== Election results ==
=== Assembly Election 1952 ===
1952 Mysore State Legislative Assembly election : Channarayapatna
Party	Candidate	Votes	%	±%
INC	K. Lakkappa	10,723	46.85%	New
KMPP	N. G. Narasimhe Gowda	7,828	34.20%	New
Independent	S. B. Joganna Gowda	4,337	18.95%	New
Margin of victory		2,895	12.65%	
Turnout		22,888	60.40%	
Total valid votes		22,888		
Registered electors		37,891		
INC win (new seat)				
