= M. J. Appaji Gowda =

Indian politician (1951–2020)

M.J. Appaji Gowda

Member of Karnataka Legislative Council
- In office 2013–2018
- Constituency: Bhadravathi

Personal details
- Died: 2 September 2020 Shimoga, India
- Party: Janata Dal (Secular)

M. J. Appaji Gowda (20 June 1951 - 2 September 2020) was a Janata Dal (Secular) political activist and member of the Karnataka Legislative Council. He died on 2 September 2020, after testing positive for COVID-19 during the COVID-19 pandemic in India.
