= P. R. Ramaiya =

Indian politician

P. R. Ramaiya (1894–1970) was the founder of Tainadu, the premier Kannada Newspaper of the Indian state of Mysore during the freedom movement. He was also an editor at the Daily News, an evening newspaper in Bangalore.

Born in Sreerangapatna in 1894, Ramaiya went to Benares to study and completed his Bachelor of Science in 1919. He then studied for his Master of Science in Chemistry but did not take the final exam. Ramaiya met Gandhi in Benares when he was a student and became involved in Gandhi's Quit India movement. In September 1942, Ramaiya was arrested and his newspaper, Tainadu, was suspended. Ramaiya was one of the first members of the Indian National Congress in Mysore. He was elected to the MLA seat from Basavanagudi from the Congress party in their first general election in 1952. He held the position of MLA from 1952 to 1957. He was ably assisted by his wife in all ventures, P. R. Jayalakshamma. Jayalakshamma was a social worker, and was the deputy mayor of Bangalore. Ramaiya is related to the educationist Professor V. T. Srinivasan, one of the founders and Principal of Vijaya college, Bangalore, through the latter's daughter, V. T. Bhuvaneswari, the head of the college's Physics Department; Bhuvaneswari was one of the daughters-in-law of Mr. P. R. Ramiaya.
