= Bangalore district =

- Former district of India
- Country: India
- State: Karnataka
- Time zone: UTC+5:30 (IST)

Bengaluru district was a district in the state of Karnataka, India. In 1986, Bangalore district was bifurcated into Bengaluru Urban district and Bengaluru Rural district.

In July 2025, the Karnataka Cabinet renamed the Bengaluru Rural district as Bengaluru North district as part of the administrative reorganization.
