= Bellary Lok Sabha constituency =

Lok Sabha constituency in Karnataka

Coordinates: 15.15°N 76.91°E

Bellary
- Lok Sabha constituency
- Ballari Lok Sabha Constituency Map

Constituency details
- Country: India
- Region: South India
- State: Karnataka
- Assembly constituencies: Hadagali; Hagaribommanahalli; Vijayanagara; Kampli; Bellary; Bellary City; Sandur; Kudligi
- Established: 1952
- Reservation: ST

Member of Parliament
- 18th Lok Sabha
- Incumbent E. Tukaram
- Party: Indian National Congress
- Elected year: 2024

Bellary Lok Sabha constituency is one of the 28 Lok Sabha constituencies in Karnataka.

== Assembly segments ==
Presently, Bellary Lok Sabha constituency comprises the following eight Assembly segments

No	Name	District	Member	Party	Party Leading (in 2024)
88	Hadagali (SC)	Vijayanagara	Krishna Nayaka	BJP	INC
89	Hagaribommanahalli (SC)	Vijayanagara	K. Nemiraj Naik	JD(S)	INC
90	Vijayanagara	Vijayanagara	H. R. Gaviyappa	INC	BJP
91	Kampli (ST)	Bellary	J. N. Ganesh	INC	INC
93	Bellary (ST)	Bellary	B. Nagendra	INC	INC
94	Bellary City	Bellary	Nara Bharath Reddy	INC	INC
95	Sandur (ST)	Bellary	E. Annapoorna Tukaram	INC	INC
96	Kudligi (ST)	Vijayanagara	N. T. Srinivas	INC	INC

== Members of Parliament ==
Year	Member	Party
1952	Tekur Subramanyam	Indian National Congress
1957	Tekur Subramanyam	Indian National Congress
1962	Tekur Subramanyam	Indian National Congress
1967	V. K. R. V. Rao	Indian National Congress
1971	V. K. R. V. Rao	Indian National Congress
1977	K.S. Veerabhadrappa	Indian National Congress
1980	R. Y. Ghorpade	Indian National Congress
1984	Basavarajeshwari	Indian National Congress
1989	Basavarajeshwari	Indian National Congress
1991	Basavarajeshwari	Indian National Congress
1996	K. C. Kondaiah	Indian National Congress
1998	K. C. Kondaiah	Indian National Congress
1999	Sonia Gandhi	Indian National Congress
2000^	Kolur Basavanagoud	Indian National Congress
2004	Karunakara Reddy	Bharatiya Janata Party
2009	J. Shantha	Bharatiya Janata Party
2014	B. Sriramulu	Bharatiya Janata Party
2018^	V. S. Ugrappa	Indian National Congress
2019	Y. Devendrappa	Bharatiya Janata Party
2024	E. Tukaram	Indian National Congress

^By-Poll

== Election results ==
Vote share of Winning candidates
2024	52.58%
2019	49.22%
2018 (By-Poll)	59.99%
2014	51.09%
2009	46.72%
2004	33.57%
2000 (By-Poll)	50.60%
1999	51.70%
1998	39.76%
1996	43.89%
1991	45.92%
1989	51.92%
1984	56.05%
1980	64.22%
1977	69.58%
1971	72.69%
1967	53.78%
1962	51.98%
1957	54.92%
1952	56.91%

=== 2024 ===
2024 Indian general election: Bellary
Party	Candidate	Votes	%	±%
INC	E. Tukaram	730,845	52.58	▲5.49
BJP	B. Sriramulu	6,31,853	45.46	▼3.63
NOTA	None of the above	7,889	0.57	▼0.17
Majority		98,992	7.12	▲5.08
Turnout		13,89,995	73.76	
INC gain from BJP		Swing		

=== 2019 ===
2019 Indian general election: Bellary
Party	Candidate	Votes	%	±%
BJP	Y. Devendrappa	601,388	49.22	+12.36
INC	V. S. Ugrappa	5,75,681	47.09	−12.8
BSP	K. Gulappa	9,961	0.82	−0.45
NOTA	None of the Above	9,024	0.74	
Majority		25,707	2.04	
Turnout		12,21,985	69.76	
BJP gain from INC		Swing		

=== By election 2018 ===
By -election, 2018: Bellary
Party	Candidate	Votes	%	±%
INC	V. S. Ugrappa	628,365	59.99	
BJP	J. Shantha	3,85,204	36.78	
IND.	Dr. T. R. Srinivas	13,714	1.31	
IND.	Y. Pampapathi	7,697	0.73	
NOTA	None of the Above	12,413	1.19	
Majority		2,43,161	23.21	
Turnout		10,47,619	61.14	
INC gain from BJP		Swing		

=== 2014 ===
2014 Indian general elections: Bellary
Party	Candidate	Votes	%	±%
BJP	B. Sreeramulu	534,406	51.09	
INC	N. Y. Hanumanthappa	4,49,262	42.95	
JD(S)	R. Ravinayaka	12,613	1.21	
NOTA	None of the above	11,320	1.08	
Majority		85,144	8.14	
Turnout		10,45,913	70.29	
BJP hold		Swing		

=== 2009 ===
2009 Indian general election: Bellary
Party	Candidate	Votes	%	±%
BJP	J. Shanta	402,213	46.72	▲13.15
INC	N. Y. Hanumanthappa	399,970	46.46	▲16.23
Independent	A. Ramanjanappa	16,167	1.88	Steady
BSP	T. Nagendra	14,712	1.71	▼2.11
CPI(ML)L	Chowdappa	11,540	1.34	▲0.03
Independent	B. Ramaiah	9,338	1.08	Steady
Independent	D. Ganganna	6,929	0.80	Steady
Majority		2,243	0.26	▼3.08
Turnout				
BJP hold		Swing		

=== 2004 ===
2004 Indian general election: Bellary
Party	Candidate	Votes	%	±%
BJP	G. Karunakara Reddy	318,978	33.57	▼11.13
INC	K. C. Kondaiah	287,299	30.23	▼21.47
JD(S)	Gulagi Nagaraj B	247,842	26.08	▲22.48
BSP	Kamala Nabhan B	36,277	3.82	New entry
Independent	Somashekara K	19,642	2.07	Steady
Independent	Narayana Moorthy P	17,571	1.85	Steady
CPI(ML)L	Idli Ramappa	12,413	1.31	New entry
Independent	Ghousia Begum	10,306	1.08	Steady
Majority		31,679	3.34	▼3.66
Turnout				
BJP gain from INC		Swing		

=== By election 2000 ===
By Election, 2000: Bellary
Party	Candidate	Votes	%	±%
INC	Kolur Basavanagoud	259,851	50.6	
BJP	K. S. Veerbhadrappa	1,63,831	31.9	
Majority		96,020	18.7	
Turnout		5,13,164	42.45	
INC hold		Swing		

=== 1999 ===
1999 Indian general election: Bellary
Party	Candidate	Votes	%	±%
INC	Sonia Gandhi	414,650	51.70	▲11.94
BJP	Sushma Swaraj	358,550	44.70	▲37.76
JD(S)	K. Mahalingappa	28,855	3.60	New entry
Majority		56,100	7.00	▼1.90
Turnout		847,219	69.84	▲7.23
INC hold		Swing		

=== 1998 ===
1998 Indian general election: Bellary
Party	Candidate	Votes	%	±%
INC	K. C. Kondaiah	284,909	39.76	▼4.13
Lok Shakti	N. Thippanna	221,171	30.86	New entry
JD	Y. Nettakallappa	186,992	26.10	▼17.06
KTVP	Sudhakar Hiremat	10,498	1.47	New entry
Independent	P. Narayana Murthy	9,201	1.28	Steady
Independent	R. Manjunath	1,888	0.26	Steady
Independent	K. Subhan Sab	1,055	0.15	Steady
Independent	P. Prakash Reddy	862	0.12	Steady
Majority		63,738	8.90	▲8.17
Turnout		738,610	62.61	▲7.00
INC hold		Swing		

=== 1996 ===
1996 Indian general election: Bellary
Party	Candidate	Votes	%	±%
INC	K. C. Kondaiah	273,584	43.89	▼2.03
JD	N. Thippanna	269,065	43.16	▲10.14
BJP	Indushekar Sangankal	43,286	6.94	▼9.65
KCP	K. V. Ravindranath Babu	16,636	2.67	New entry
Independent	21 Independent Candidates	20,827	3.34	Steady
Majority		4,519	0.73	▼12.17
Turnout		642,633	55.61	▲4.34
INC hold		Swing		

=== 1991 ===
1991 Indian general election: Bellary
Party	Candidate	Votes	%	±%
INC	Basavarajeshwari	234,812	45.92	▼6.00
JD	Y. Netakallappa	168,831	33.02	▼7.16
BJP	K. Nagabhushanam	84,837	16.59	New entry
Independent	11 Independent Candidates	22,832	4.47	Steady
Majority		65,981	12.90	▲1.16
Turnout		531,221	51.27	▼15.63
INC hold		Swing		

=== 1989 ===
1989 Indian general election: Bellary
Party	Candidate	Votes	%	±%
INC	Basavarajesweri	336,337	51.92	▼4.13
JD	N. Thippana	260,252	40.18	New entry
JP	Kotraiah Guruvina	40,466	6.25	▼35.15
Independent	H. Sreenivasa Acharya	10,720	1.65	Steady
Majority		76,085	11.74	▼2.91
Turnout		689,764	66.90	▲0.49
INC hold		Swing		

=== 1984 ===
1984 Indian general election: Bellary
Party	Candidate	Votes	%	±%
INC	Basavarajeswari	276,640	56.05	New entry
JP	M. P. Prakash	204,354	41.40	▲34.11
Independent	S. M. Shanthaveeraiah	3,125	0.63	Steady
Independent	K. Shanmukhappa	1,967	0.40	Steady
Independent	G. M. Cholaiah	1,929	0.39	Steady
Independent	K. S. Channabasappa	1,867	0.38	Steady
Independent	H. Srinivasa Acharya	1,855	0.38	Steady
Independent	H. M. Ehsanullah	1,838	0.37	Steady
Majority		72,286	14.65	▼22.56
Turnout		510,244	66.41	▲12.16
INC gain from INC(I)		Swing		

=== 1980 ===
1980 Indian general election: Bellary
Party	Candidate	Votes	%	±%
INC(I)	R. Y. Ghorpade	234,792	64.22	New entry
INC(U)	M. Y. Ghorpade	98,755	27.01	New entry
JP	N. Rachaiah	26,641	7.29	▼23.13
Independent	D. Muhammed Ghouse	3,838	1.05	Steady
Independent	A. M. Gangappa Swamy	1,552	0.42	Steady
Majority		136,037	37.21	▼1.95
Turnout		380,495	54.25	▼10.78
INC(I) gain from INC		Swing		

=== 1977 ===
1977 Indian general election: Bellary
Party	Candidate	Votes	%	±%
INC	K. S. Veera Bhadrappa	258,589	69.58	▼3.11
JP	N. Thippanna	113,045	30.42	New entry
Majority		145,544	39.16	▼8.96
Turnout		386,059	65.03	▲2.40
INC hold		Swing		

=== 1971 ===
1971 Indian general election: Bellary
Party	Candidate	Votes	%	±%
INC	V. K. R. V. Rao	230,901	72.69	▲18.91
SWA	Y. Mahabaleswarappa	78,041	24.57	▼21.65
Independent	S. Gurunath	5,799	1.83	Steady
Independent	A. M. Gangappaswamy	2,896	0.91	Steady
Majority		152,860	48.12	▲40.56
Turnout		332,265	62.63	▼4.87
INC hold		Swing		

=== 1967 ===
1967 Indian general election: Bellary
Party	Candidate	Votes	%	±%
INC	V. K. R. V. Rao	173,402	53.78	▲1.80
SWA	Y. Mahabaleswarappa	149,022	46.22	▼1.80
Majority		24,380	7.56	▲3.60
Turnout		337,391	67.50	▲5.30
INC hold		Swing		

=== 1962 ===
1962 Indian general election: Bellary
Party	Candidate	Votes	%	±%
INC	T. Subramanyam	148,765	51.98	▼2.94
SWA	J. Mohamad Imamsab	137,448	48.02	New entry
Majority		11,317	3.96	▼5.88
Turnout		299,787	62.20	▼0.39
INC hold		Swing		

=== 1957 ===
1957 Indian general election: Bellary
Party	Candidate	Votes	%	±%
INC	T. Subramanyam	146,670	54.92	▼1.99
Independent	Y. Mahabaleswarappa	120,382	45.08	Steady
Majority		26,288	9.84	▼3.98
Turnout		267,052	62.59	▲1.38
INC hold		Swing		

=== 1952 ===
1952 Indian general election: Bellary
Party	Candidate	Votes	%	±%
INC	T. Subrahmanyam	124,976	56.91	New entry
Independent	Y. Mahabaleshwarappa	94,615	43.09	Steady
Majority		30,361	13.82	New entry
Turnout		219,591	61.21	New entry
INC win (new seat)				

== See also ==
- Bellary district
- List of constituencies of the Lok Sabha
