= Molakalmuru Assembly constituency =

Legislative Assembly constituency in Karnataka State, India

Coordinates: 14.72°N 76.75°E

Molakalmuru
- Constituency No. 97 for the Karnataka Legislative Assembly

Constituency details
- Country: India
- Region: South India
- State: Karnataka
- District: Chitradurga
- Lok Sabha constituency: Chitradurga
- Established: 1951
- Total electors: 2,43,788
- Reservation: ST

Member of Legislative Assembly
- 16th Karnataka Legislative Assembly
- Incumbent N. Y. Gopalakrishna
- Party: Indian National Congress

Molakalmuru Assembly constituency is one of the 224 Legislative Assembly constituencies of Karnataka in India.

It is part of Chitradurga district and parliamentary constituency, and is reserved for candidates belonging to the Scheduled Tribes.

== Members of the Legislative Assembly ==
Election	Member	Party
1952	A. Bhimappa Naik	Indian National Congress
1957	S. Nijalingappa	Indian National Congress
1962	S. H. Basanna	Indian National Congress
1967	S. H. Basanna	Indian National Congress
1972	Patil Papanaik	Indian National Congress
1978	Patil Papanaik	Indian National Congress
1983	N. G. Naik	Indian National Congress
1985	Purna Muthappa	Janata Party
1989	N. G. Naik	Indian National Congress
1994	Purna Muthappa	Janata Dal
1997 By-election (Note: Died on 20/01/1997)	N. Y. Gopalakrishna	Indian National Congress
1999	N. Y. Gopalakrishna	Indian National Congress
2004	N. Y. Gopalakrishna	Indian National Congress
2008	N. Y. Gopalakrishna	Indian National Congress
2013	S. Thippeswamy	Badavara Shramikara Raitara Congress
2018	B. Sriramulu	Bharatiya Janata Party
2023	N. Y. Gopalakrishna	Indian National Congress

== Election results ==
=== Assembly Election 2023 ===
2023 Karnataka Legislative Assembly election : Molakalmuru
Party	Candidate	Votes	%	±%
INC	N. Y. Gopalakrishna	109,459	53.81%	▲32.01
BJP	S. Thippeswamy	87,310	42.92%	▼0.71
JD(S)	Veerabhadrappa	1,594	0.78%	▼7.15
NOTA	None of the above	1,561	0.77%	▲0.06
Margin of victory		22,149	10.89%	▼10.95
Turnout		203,455	83.46%	▲0.13
Total valid votes		203,405		
Registered electors		243,788		▲5.47
INC gain from BJP		Swing	▲10.18	

=== Assembly Election 2018 ===
2018 Karnataka Legislative Assembly election : Molakalmuru
Party	Candidate	Votes	%	±%
BJP	B. Sriramulu	84,018	43.63%	▲41.45
INC	Dr. B. Yogesh Babu	41,973	21.80%	▼25.34
Independent	S. Thippeswamy	41,152	21.37%	New
JD(S)	G. M. Thippeswamy Patel	15,262	7.93%	▲5.06
Independent	S. Chandranna (Yattinahatty)	3,223	1.67%	New
Pyramid Party of India	K. Raghavendra	1,427	0.74%	New
Independent	S. P. Raju (Sasalahatty Rajanna)	1,366	0.71%	New
NOTA	None of the above	1,361	0.71%	New
Margin of victory		42,045	21.84%	▲16.99
Turnout		192,621	83.33%	▲3.92
Total valid votes		192,549		
Registered electors		231,151		▲11.58
BJP gain from BSRCP		Swing	▼8.36	

=== Assembly Election 2013 ===
2013 Karnataka Legislative Assembly election : Molakalmuru
Party	Candidate	Votes	%	±%
BSRCP	S. Thippeswamy	76,827	51.99%	New
INC	N. Y. Gopalakrishna	69,658	47.14%	▲10.03
JD(S)	Dr. Obanna Poojar	4,234	2.87%	▼17.18
BJP	Dasari Kirthi Kumar	3,227	2.18%	▼31.27
KJP	Dhrakshayanamma	1,832	1.24%	New
Independent	Sanna Maranna	1,536	1.04%	New
CPI	Commred Patel. G. Papanayaka	1,438	0.97%	▼1.00
Margin of victory		7,169	4.85%	▲1.18
Turnout		164,510	79.41%	▲7.49
Total valid votes		147,776		
Registered electors		207,158		▲7.56
BSRCP gain from INC		Swing	▲14.88	

=== Assembly Election 2008 ===
2008 Karnataka Legislative Assembly election : Molakalmuru
Party	Candidate	Votes	%	±%
INC	N. Y. Gopalakrishna	51,402	37.11%	▲7.63
BJP	S. Thippeswamy	46,326	33.45%	New
JD(S)	G. M. Thippeswamy Patel	27,774	20.05%	▲12.94
Independent	Sanna Maranna	2,938	2.12%	New
CPI	Patel G. Papanayak(comred)	2,732	1.97%	New
BSP	Dr. N. P. Venkatesh	2,063	1.49%	▼13.06
Swarna Yuga Party	P. Shivanna	1,160	0.84%	New
Independent	N. R. Mallaiahswamy	911	0.66%	New
Independent	D. Mahesh Kumar	892	0.64%	New
Margin of victory		5,076	3.67%	▼1.98
Turnout		138,510	71.92%	▲1.35
Total valid votes		138,495		
Registered electors		192,601		▲19.13
INC hold		Swing	▲7.63	

=== Assembly Election 2004 ===
2004 Karnataka Legislative Assembly election : Molakalmuru
Party	Candidate	Votes	%	±%
INC	N. Y. Gopalakrishna	33,592	29.48%	▼15.18
JD(U)	G. M. Thippeswamy Patel	27,155	23.83%	▼6.54
JP	Nagareddy. H. T	23,982	21.04%	New
BSP	M. Jayanna	16,581	14.55%	▲3.50
JD(S)	Ramadas. B	8,100	7.11%	▼5.89
Independent	N. R. Mallaiahswamy	1,305	1.15%	New
Kannada Nadu Party	Parameshwarappa. A. T	1,282	1.12%	New
Urs Samyuktha Paksha	Mohana. M. P	1,026	0.90%	New
Pyramid Party of India	Lakshmi. P. V	940	0.82%	New
Margin of victory		6,437	5.65%	▼8.65
Turnout		114,091	70.57%	▼2.65
Total valid votes		113,963		
Registered electors		161,671		▲14.39
INC hold		Swing	▼15.18	

=== Assembly Election 1999 ===
1999 Karnataka Legislative Assembly election : Molakalmuru
Party	Candidate	Votes	%	±%
INC	N. Y. Gopalakrishna	44,296	44.66%	▼6.74
JD(U)	G. M. Thippeswamy Patel	30,115	30.37%	New
JD(S)	Patel G. Papanayaka	12,896	13.00%	New
BSP	M. Jayanna	10,961	11.05%	New
Independent	D. Ganganna	907	0.91%	New
Margin of victory		14,181	14.30%	▲2.31
Turnout		103,483	73.22%	▼2.94
Total valid votes		99,175		
Rejected ballots		4,262	4.12%	▲2.18
Registered electors		141,331		▲4.47
INC hold		Swing	▼6.74	

=== Assembly By-election 1997 ===
1997 Karnataka Legislative Assembly by-election : Molakalmuru
Party	Candidate	Votes	%	±%
INC	N. Y. Gopalakrishna	51,916	51.40%	▲42.75
JD	Patel Gom. Thuppeswamy Ethinahatly Gewphry	39,809	39.41%	▲0.15
BJP	G. Basavaraj Mandimat	7,700	7.62%	▼3.61
Independent	G. Ramachandra Naik	1,079	1.07%	New
Margin of victory		12,107	11.99%	▲5.66
Turnout		103,030	76.16%	▲5.23
Total valid votes		101,004		
Rejected ballots		1,995	1.94%	▼0.24
Registered electors		135,279		▲4.80
INC gain from JD		Swing	▲12.14	

=== Assembly Election 1994 ===
1994 Karnataka Legislative Assembly election : Molakalmuru
Party	Candidate	Votes	%	±%
JD	Purna Muthappa	35,160	39.26%	▲10.35
Independent	N. Y. Gopalakrishna	29,492	32.93%	New
BJP	P. Ramakrishna Reddy	10,058	11.23%	▲7.76
INC	N. G. Naik	7,749	8.65%	▼42.21
KRRS	E. Nagendrappa	2,741	3.06%	New
INC	K. Shakunatala Swamy	2,518	2.81%	New
SP	R. Rajanna	852	0.95%	New
Margin of victory		5,668	6.33%	▼15.63
Turnout		91,556	70.93%	▲1.23
Total valid votes		89,547		
Rejected ballots		1,995	2.18%	▼3.33
Registered electors		129,078		▲5.98
JD gain from INC		Swing	▼11.60	

=== Assembly Election 1989 ===
1989 Karnataka Legislative Assembly election : Molakalmuru
Party	Candidate	Votes	%	±%
INC	N. G. Naik	40,802	50.86%	▲1.62
JD	Purna Muthappa	23,188	28.91%	New
JP	S. Thippeswamy	6,242	7.78%	New
Kranti Sabha	G. Naryana Reddy	5,295	6.60%	New
BJP	P. M. Chandrasekhar	2,784	3.47%	New
Independent	E. Nagendrappa	1,003	1.25%	New
Margin of victory		17,614	21.96%	▲20.44
Turnout		84,894	69.70%	▲5.83
Total valid votes		80,218		
Rejected ballots		4,676	5.51%	▲4.03
Registered electors		121,791		▲29.58
INC gain from JP		Swing	▲0.10	

=== Assembly Election 1985 ===
1985 Karnataka Legislative Assembly election : Molakalmuru
Party	Candidate	Votes	%	±%
JP	Purna Muthappa	30,022	50.76%	▲15.85
INC	N. G. Naik	29,121	49.24%	▼0.99
Margin of victory		901	1.52%	▼13.81
Turnout		60,033	63.87%	▼0.58
Total valid votes		59,143		
Rejected ballots		890	1.48%	▼0.87
Registered electors		93,987		▲7.42
JP gain from INC		Swing	▲0.53	

=== Assembly Election 1983 ===
1983 Karnataka Legislative Assembly election : Molakalmuru
Party	Candidate	Votes	%	±%
INC	N. G. Naik	27,659	50.23%	▲45.89
JP	B. M. Thippeswamy	19,220	34.91%	▼10.22
Independent	R. Rajanna	7,503	13.63%	New
Independent	Bhageerathi Naik	527	0.96%	New
Margin of victory		8,439	15.33%	▲9.93
Turnout		56,388	64.45%	▼12.53
Total valid votes		55,061		
Rejected ballots		1,327	2.35%	▲0.08
Registered electors		87,496		▲9.71
INC gain from INC(I)		Swing	▼0.30	

=== Assembly Election 1978 ===
1978 Karnataka Legislative Assembly election : Molakalmuru
Party	Candidate	Votes	%	±%
INC(I)	Patil Papanaik	30,316	50.53%	New
JP	H. C. Boraiah	27,075	45.13%	New
INC	M. R. Pundareekakshappa	2,603	4.34%	▼55.04
Margin of victory		3,241	5.40%	▼13.35
Turnout		61,389	76.98%	▲9.71
Total valid votes		59,994		
Rejected ballots		1,395	2.27%	▲2.27
Registered electors		79,751		▲11.21
INC(I) gain from INC		Swing	▼8.85	

=== Assembly Election 1972 ===
1972 Mysore State Legislative Assembly election : Molakalmuru
Party	Candidate	Votes	%	±%
INC	Patil Papanaik	28,038	59.38%	▲5.84
INC(O)	H. C. Boraiah	19,183	40.62%	New
Margin of victory		8,855	18.75%	▲9.96
Turnout		48,239	67.27%	▲0.79
Total valid votes		47,221		
Registered electors		71,709		▲14.95
INC hold		Swing	▲5.84	

=== Assembly Election 1967 ===
1967 Mysore State Legislative Assembly election : Molakalmuru
Party	Candidate	Votes	%	±%
INC	S. H. Basanna	20,801	53.54%	▼0.50
PSP	K. B. Obaiah	17,388	44.76%	▲5.77
Independent	C. L. Reddy	660	1.70%	New
Margin of victory		3,413	8.79%	▼6.26
Turnout		41,472	66.48%	▼4.57
Total valid votes		38,849		
Registered electors		62,382		▲7.36
INC hold		Swing	▼0.50	

=== Assembly Election 1962 ===
1962 Mysore State Legislative Assembly election : Molakalmuru
Party	Candidate	Votes	%	±%
INC	S. H. Basanna	20,845	54.04%	▼4.17
PSP	G. Veeranna	15,041	38.99%	▼2.80
Independent	Basavanaika	2,688	6.97%	New
Margin of victory		5,804	15.05%	▼1.38
Turnout		41,282	71.05%	▲5.94
Total valid votes		38,574		
Registered electors		58,104		▲14.91
INC hold		Swing	▼4.17	

=== Assembly Election 1957 ===
1957 Mysore State Legislative Assembly election : Molakalmuru
Party	Candidate	Votes	%	±%
INC	S. Nijalingappa	19,167	58.21%	▲2.35
PSP	G. V. Anjanappa	13,758	41.79%	New
Margin of victory		5,409	16.43%	▲4.71
Turnout		32,925	65.11%	▼3.72
Total valid votes		32,925		
Registered electors		50,565		▲25.88
INC hold		Swing	▲2.35	

=== Assembly Election 1952 ===
1952 Mysore State Legislative Assembly election : Molakalmuru
Party	Candidate	Votes	%	±%
INC	A. Bhimappa Naik	15,444	55.86%	New
Independent	S. H. Basanna	12,203	44.14%	New
Margin of victory		3,241	11.72%	
Turnout		27,647	68.83%	
Total valid votes		27,647		
Registered electors		40,168		
INC win (new seat)				

== See also ==
- List of constituencies of the Karnataka Legislative Assembly
- Chitradurga district
