= Valmiki Corporation scam (Karnataka) =

2024 Indian financial fraud scam

The Valmiki Corporation scam was a major Indian financial fraud scam involving the Karnataka Maharshi Valmiki Scheduled Tribes Development Corporation (KMVSTDC) that occurred in 2024.

The scam was discovered after the suicide of 52-year-old corporation superintendent Chandrasekaran P. who left behind a suicide note detailing corruption and involving several officials. ₹8.8 crore out of ₹18.7 crore Indian Rupees (INR) earmarked for the projects of 2024-25 were transferred to an unauthorized account of the Union Bank of India MG Road branch without the notice of the corporation chairman. On February 26, 2024, the bank transferred ₹88 million from the corporation's account to different accounts with the signatures of the corporation's managing director and accountants.

The Indian Special Investigation Team (SIT) said that the money was transferred to First Finance Credit Cooperative Society, and later transferred online to different accounts and the money was withdrawn by many people.

== History ==
=== Nature of the scam ===
The scam involved misappropriation of approximately ₹94 crore (about US$12 million) by the corporation. The funds were illegally transferred from the corporation's accounts at the Union Bank of India MG Road branch to multiple accounts, some of which were linked to fictitious entities. The fraudulent activity misappropriated funds meant for the development of Scheduled Tribes in Karnataka.

=== The suicide note ===
Corporation superintendent Chandrasekaran. P (52) died by suicide on Sunday night at his residence in Kuvempu Nagar, Shimoga. Before committing suicide, Chandrasekaran wrote a 5-page suicide note against the officials of the corporation, saying that there had been an embezzlement of INR 85 crore in the corporation. MD of the corporation JG Padmanabh, accountant Parasurama Durugannavar, and Union Bank manager Shukismita Ravul, mentioned the role of the corporation in the illegal activity. "The MD of the corporation has forcibly transferred the grant. We did not understand the intrigue. The Bank passbook and checkbook have not been given to the corporation yet. He also mentioned that the bank manager did not give a proper answer in this regard. I have not cheated the corporation, I have not been involved in malfeasance. No cheating was done. Instead, the money of the corporation is transferred illegally. I have no role in this". He wrote in his suicide note that "the mistake I made under the pressure of work was closing the account's checkbook and cash book."

=== Investigation ===
1. Several top officials, including the corporation's managing director and eight bank officials, have come under scrutiny. The Central Bureau of Investigation (CBI) has registered a First Information Report (FIR) and is actively investigating the case. The Special Investigation Team (SIT) made several arrests, including those of suspended MDs and accounts officers, as well as persons involved in the creation of fake accounts used in misappropriation.
2. The scandal led to a major political fallout, with the opposition BJP demanding the resignation of Karnataka Chief Minister Siddaramaiah. The name of Minister B Nagendra was mentioned. The minister resigned
3. The SIT froze several bank accounts and is tracking the flow of money to recover the defrauded funds. The investigation revealed that the fraud was perpetrated over some time by systematically siphoning off funds from the corporation's budget earmarked for tribal welfare.
4. On 10 July 2024, the Enforcement Directorate raided Minister B Nagendra premises and Chairman Basanavagowda Daddal
