= 1994 Karnataka Legislative Assembly election =

- 13 December 1994

All 224 Legislative Assembly seats 113 seats needed for a majority
- Turnout: 68.59 pp (▲1.02 pp)
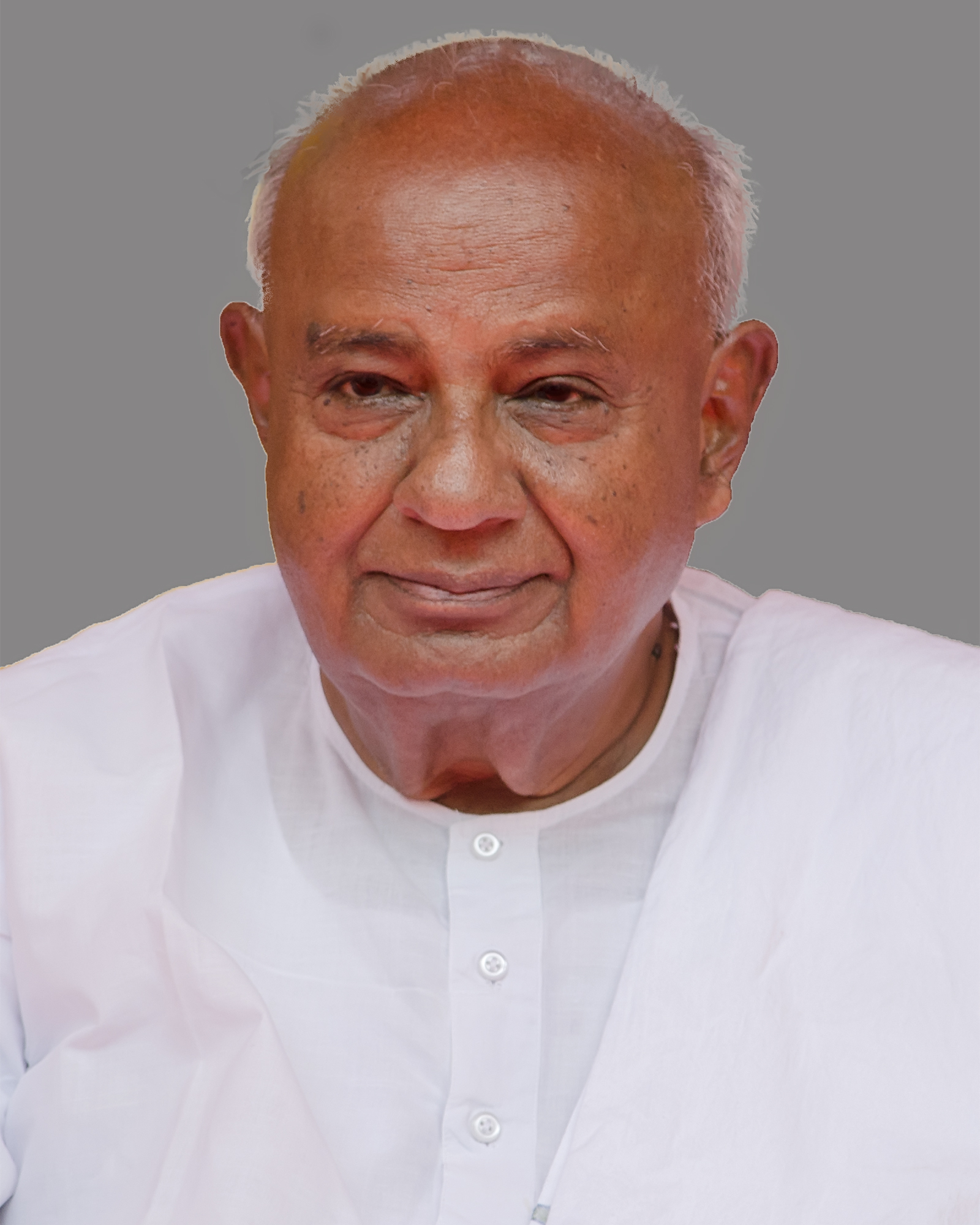

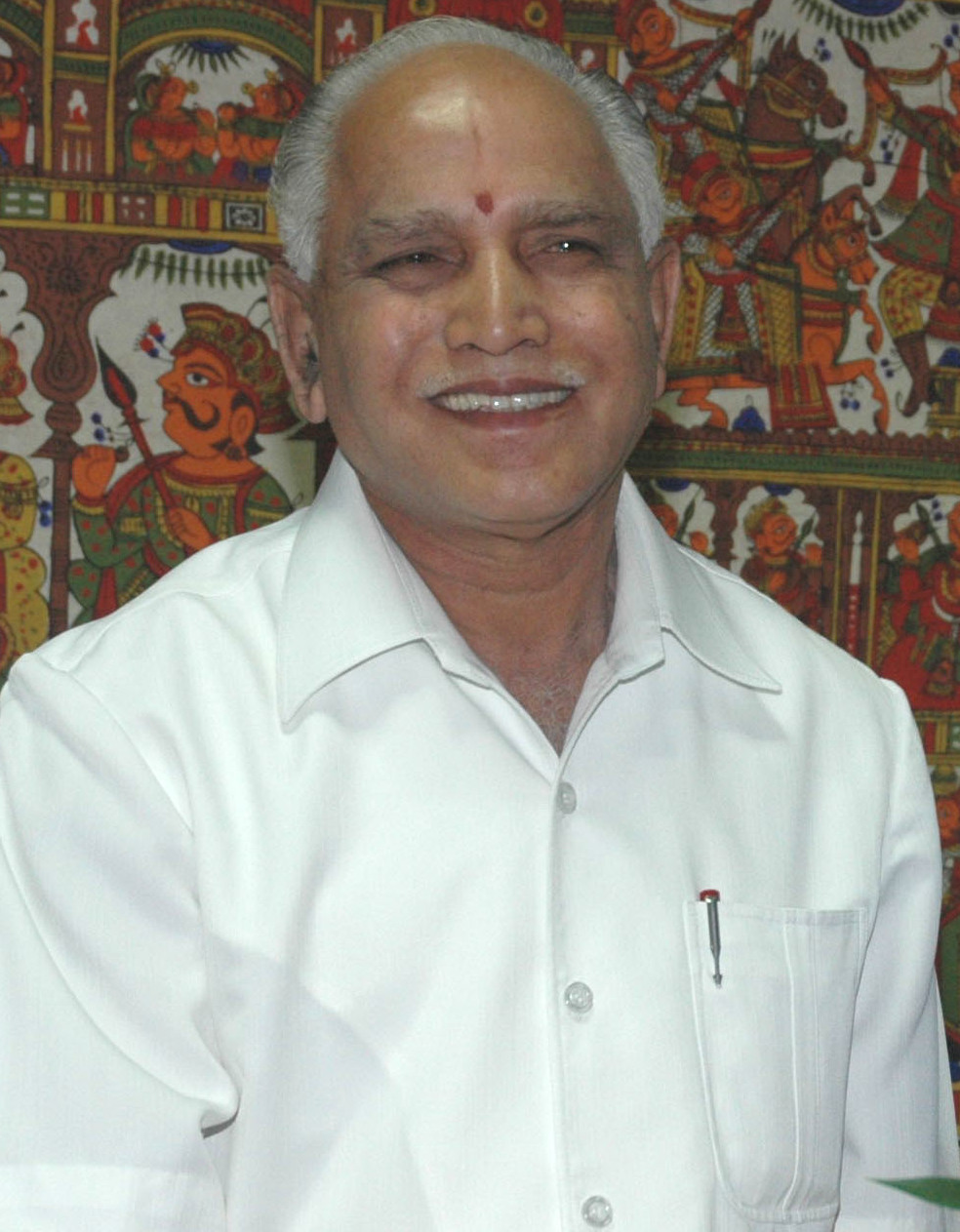

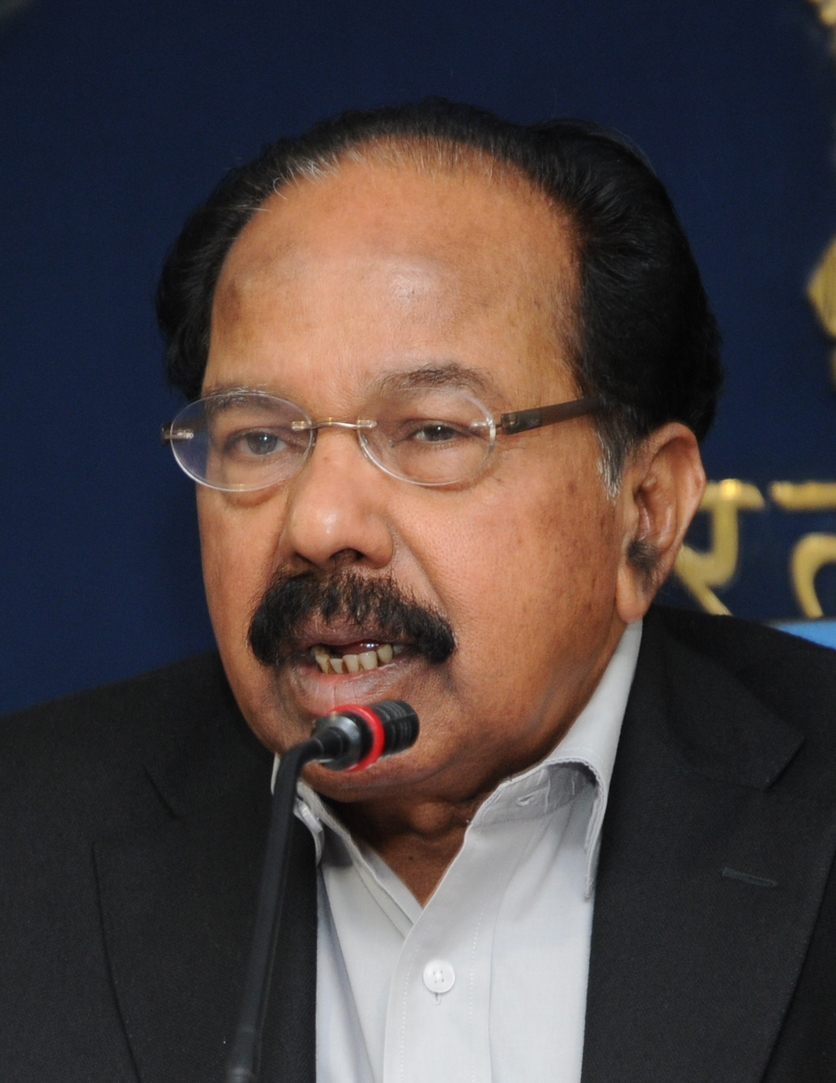
	Majority party	Minority party	Third party
Leader	H. D. Deve Gowda	B. S. Yeddyurappa	Veerappa Moily
Party	JD	BJP	INC
Leader's seat	Ramanagara	Shikaripura	Karkala
Last election	24	4	178
Seats won	115	40	34
Seat change	▲81	▲36	▼144
Popular vote	69,44,464	35,17,119	55,80,473
Percentage	33.54%	16.99%	26.95%
Swing	▲6.46 pp	▲12.85 pp	▼16.55 pp
- Map of Karnataka Legislative Assembly after the election
Chief Minister before election
Veerappa Moily
INC
Elected Chief Minister
H. D. Devegowda
JD

The 1994 Karnataka Legislative Assembly election took place in two phases on 26 November and 1 December 1994 in all the 224 legislative assembly constituencies in the Indian State of Karnataka. The Janata Dal emerged victorious, winning 115 seats.

== Parties and alliances ==
=== Bharatiya Janata Party ===
No.	Party	Flag	Symbol	Leader	Seats contested
1.	Bharatiya Janata Party			B. S. Yeddyurappa	223

=== Indian National Congress ===
No.	Party	Flag	Symbol	Leader	Seats contested
1.	Indian National Congress			Veerappa Moily	221

=== Janata Dal ===
No.	Party	Flag	Symbol	Leader	Seats contested
1.	Janata Dal			H. D. Deve Gowda	221

== Results ==
Parties and coalitions	Popular vote			Seats		
Parties and coalitions	Votes	%	±pp	Contested	Won	+/−
Janata Dal	69,44,464	33.54	▲6.46	221	115	▲77
Bharatiya Janata Party	35,17,119	16.99	▲12.85	223	40	▲36
Indian National Congress	55,80,473	26.95	▼16.55	221	34	▼143
Karnataka Congress Party	15,13,290	7.31	▲7.31	218	10	▲10
Independents (IND)	19,99,718	9.66	▼3.50	1,256	18	▼8
Other	11,50,139	5.55	▼11.35	358	7	▲1
Total	2,07,05,203	100.00		2,497	224	±0
Valid votes	2,07,05,203	97.93				
Invalid votes	4,38,448	2.07				
Votes cast / turnout	2,11,49,966	68.59				
Abstentions	96,85,449	31.41				
Registered voters	3,08,35,415					

=== District wise results ===
District	Seats						
District	Seats	JND	BJP	INC	KCP	IND	OTH
Bidar	6	3	1	1	—N/a	—N/a	1
Gulbarga	12	3	1	5	2	—N/a	1
Raichur	11	8	—N/a	2	—N/a	1	—N/a
Bellary	9	3	1	3	—N/a	2	—N/a
Chitradurga	11	5	1	—N/a	1	4	—N/a
Tumkur	13	6	2	3	1	1	—N/a
Kolar	12	8	—N/a	1	—N/a	1	2
Bangalore Urban	13	6	5	1	—N/a	—N/a	1
Bangalore Rural	9	7	1	—N/a	—N/a	1	—N/a
Mandya	9	7	—N/a	—N/a	—N/a	1	1
Mysore	16	11	4	—N/a	—N/a	—N/a	1
Kodagu	3	—N/a	3	—N/a	—N/a	—N/a	—N/a
Hassan	8	5	1	1	—N/a	1	—N/a
Dakshina Kannada	14	3	7	3	1	—N/a	—N/a
Chikmagalur	6	4	—N/a	1	—N/a	1	—N/a
Shimoga	10	2	4	1	2	1	—N/a
Uttara Kannada	6	2	3	—N/a	1	—N/a	—N/a
Dharwad	18	10	4	3	1	—N/a	—N/a
Belagavi	18	10	—N/a	5	—N/a	3	—N/a
Bijapur	15	9	1	4	—N/a	1	—N/a
Total	224	115	40	34	10	18	7

=== Results by constituency ===
District	Constituency		Turnout	Winner				Runner-up				Margin
District	No.	Name	%	Candidate	Party	Votes	%	Candidate	Party	Votes	%	Margin
Bidar	1	Aurad	63.97	Gurupadappa Nagamarapalli	JD	29,479	30.19	Shekhar Patil	INC	28,800	29.49	679
Bidar	2	Bhalki	64.98	Vijaykumar Khandre	INC	35,739	45.11	Baburao Madkatti	BJP	18,100	22.85	17,639
Bidar	3	Hulsoor	56.37	L. K. Chawan	BJP	28,402	39.45	Manik Pranjape	JD	24,034	33.38	4,368
Bidar	4	Bidar	57.98	Syed Hashmi	BSP	25,433	26.17	Amruth Chimkod	JD	21,881	22.51	3,552
Bidar	5	Humnabad	65.36	Merajuddin Patel	JD	25,704	30.61	Basavaraj Havgiappa Patil	INC	21,816	25.98	3,888
Bidar	6	Basavakalyan	62.26	Basavaraj Patil Attur	JD	34,728	40.10	Maruthirao Muley	INC	28,299	32.68	6,429
Gulbarga	7	Chincholi	66.43	Vaijnath Patil	JD	56,373	69.13	Kailashnath Patil	INC	17,320	21.24	39,053
Gulbarga	8	Kamalapur	55.99	Revu Naik Belamgi	BJP	19,389	29.77	G. Ramakrishna	INC	13,818	21.22	5,571
Gulbarga	9	Aland	64.71	Subhash Guttedar	KPCC	35,549	47.45	B. R. Patil	JD	17,225	22.99	18,324
Gulbarga	10	Gulbarga	61.88	Qamar ul Islam	INL	58,719	44.37	Shashil G. Namoshi	BJP	40,829	30.85	17,890
Gulbarga	11	Shahabad	51.62	C. Gurunath	JD	32,937	40.33	Baburao Chavhan	INC	16,086	19.70	16,851
Gulbarga	12	Afzalpur	60.52	Malikayya Guttedar	KPCC	39,924	49.27	M. Y. Patil	INC	35,703	44.06	4,221
Gulbarga	13	Chittapur	60.38	Baburao Chinchansur	INC	25,355	36.32	Vishawanath Patil	Ind	24,529	35.14	826
Gulbarga	14	Sedam	64.60	Chandrashekar Madna	JD	37,118	47.12	Baswanthreddy Motakpalli	INC	24,485	31.08	12,633
Gulbarga	15	Jevargi	56.51	Dharam Singh	INC	30,840	40.91	Shivalingappa Naribol	KPCC	26,785	35.53	4,055
Gulbarga	16	Gurmitkal	62.89	Mallikarjun Kharge	INC	42,588	58.76	K. B. Shanappa	JD	23,252	32.08	19,336
Gulbarga	17	Yadgir	58.10	Malakaraddy Lakshmareddy	INC	26,359	38.74	Sadashivaraddy Kandakur	JD	19,635	28.86	6,724
Gulbarga	18	Shahapur	62.54	Sharanabasappa Darshanapur	JD	40,984	46.42	Shivashekareppa Gouda	INC	27,158	30.76	13,826
Gulbarga	19	Shorapur	61.61	Raja Venkatappa Naik	KPCC	34,078	38.19	Shivanna Mangihal	JD	28,419	31.85	5,659
Raichur	20	Devadurga	48.64	B. T. Lalitha Naik	JD	20,946	37.72	Yellappa	KPCC	14,943	26.91	6,003
Raichur	21	Raichur	56.39	M. S. Patil	JD	28,776	37.34	Syed Yasin	INC	23,715	30.77	5,061
Raichur	22	Kalmala	60.83	B. Muniyappa	JD	32,332	38.96	Basavaraj Sirwar	INC	20,244	24.39	12,088
Raichur	23	Manvi	60.51	Gangadhar Nayak	JD	22,130	30.52	Basavana Byagwat	INC	20,420	28.16	1,710
Raichur	24	Lingsugur	60.32	Amaregouda Patil	JD	32,487	42.67	Raja Amareshwara Naik	INC	19,799	26.01	12,688
Raichur	25	Sindhanur	72.08	K. Virupaxappa	INC	51,415	41.96	Hampanagouda Badarli	JD	50,968	41.59	447
Raichur	26	Kushtagi	64.22	K. Sharnappa	JD	41,972	48.83	Hanamagouda Patil	INC	24,838	28.90	17,134
Raichur	27	Yelburga	64.62	Basavaraj Rayareddy	JD	47,215	60.15	Jayshree Patil	INC	15,347	19.55	31,868
Raichur	28	Kanakagiri	62.97	Nagappa Saloni	JD	32,238	38.41	M. Malikarjun Nagappa	INC	32,045	38.18	193
Raichur	29	Gangawati	60.88	Srirangadevarayalu	INC	25,478	31.03	Rajaseekharappa Gunjalli	JD	21,152	25.76	4,326
Raichur	30	Koppal	68.32	Karadi Sanganna Amarappa	Ind	19,850	23.13	Hanumanthappa Angadi	JD	12,596	14.68	7,254
Bellary	31	Siruguppa	69.10	T. N. Chandrashekaraiah	JD	41,673	37.62	M. Shankar Reddy	INC	31,552	28.49	10,121
Bellary	32	Kurugodu	68.94	Allum Veerabhadrappa	INC	31,341	33.67	M. Ramappa	KPCC	26,400	28.36	4,941
Bellary	33	Bellary	55.54	M. Divakar Babu	Ind	40,156	47.33	Venkat Mahipal	INC	17,280	20.37	22,876
Bellary	34	Hospet	63.39	G. Shankar Goud	BJP	48,249	48.06	H. Abdul Wahab	INC	29,988	29.87	18,261
Bellary	35	Sandur	64.11	M. Y. Ghorpade	INC	39,176	53.24	Sudhakar Hiremath	KPCC	14,797	20.11	24,379
Bellary	36	Kudligi	71.80	N. M. Nabisahib	JD	34,413	38.21	N. T. Bommanna	INC	22,696	25.20	11,717
Bellary	37	Kottur	69.30	T. Marulasiddana Goud	INC	29,922	35.39	M. M. J. Swaroopa Nanda	JD	27,102	32.06	2,820
Bellary	38	Hoovina Hadagali	74.83	M. P. Prakash	JD	59,056	60.61	Kotraiah Guruvina	INC	32,345	33.19	26,711
Bellary	39	Harapanahalli	69.81	D. Narayana Das	Ind	21,798	25.82	B. H. Yanka Naik	INC	17,514	20.75	4,284
Chitradurga	40	Harihar	72.26	H. Shivappa	Ind	39,356	37.57	Y. Nagappa	INC	37,210	35.52	2,146
Chitradurga	41	Davanagere	62.54	Shamanuru Shivashankarappa	Ind	37,794	35.83	K. B. Shankaranarayana	BJP	36,247	34.36	1,547
Chitradurga	42	Mayakonda	66.37	S. A. Ravindranath	BJP	48,955	49.01	Nagamma C. Keshavamurty	INC	22,799	22.83	26,156
Chitradurga	43	Bharamasagara	68.70	M. Chandrappa	JD	32,617	37.16	K. R. Eswar Naik	BJP	18,770	21.39	13,847
Chitradurga	44	Chitradurga	65.17	G. H. Thippareddy	Ind	38,332	39.16	H. Ekanthaiah	JD	30,149	30.80	8,183
Chitradurga	45	Jagalur	70.85	M. Basappa	KPCC	33,272	35.73	G. H. Ashwath Reddy	INC	30,526	32.78	2,746
Chitradurga	46	Molakalmuru	70.93	Purna Muthappa	JD	35,160	39.26	N. Y. Gopalakrishna	Ind	29,492	32.93	5,668
Chitradurga	47	Challakere	69.42	Thippeswamy	JD	39,560	41.68	N. Jayanna	INC	25,919	27.31	13,641
Chitradurga	48	Hiriyur	67.53	D. Manjunath	JD	43,911	49.19	K. H. Ranganath	INC	24,302	27.22	19,609
Chitradurga	49	Holalkere	71.23	U. H. Thimmanna	JD	27,026	27.80	A. V. Umapathy	Ind	26,090	26.83	936
Chitradurga	50	Hosadurga	73.85	T. H. Basavaraja	Ind	26,453	25.52	E. V. Vijay Kumar	INC	21,384	20.63	5,069
Tumkur	51	Pavagada	74.45	Somlanaika	JD	46,739	41.46	Venkataramanappa	INC	41,543	36.85	5,196
Tumkur	52	Sira	74.17	B. Sathyanarayana	JD	28,272	30.37	S. K. Siddanna	KPCC	25,513	27.41	2,759
Tumkur	53	Kallambella	76.52	T. B. Jayachandra	INC	28,729	32.19	B. Ganganna	JD	20,158	22.59	8,571
Tumkur	54	Bellavi	73.74	R. Narayana	INC	22,777	24.54	C. N. Bhaskarappa	JD	20,946	22.56	1,831
Tumkur	55	Madhugiri	74.49	Ganga Hanumaiah	JD	45,303	43.57	G. Parameshwara	INC	42,131	40.52	3,172
Tumkur	56	Koratagere	75.64	C. Channigappa	JD	35,672	33.56	G. Venkatachalaiah	INC	27,937	26.28	7,735
Tumkur	57	Tumkur	68.96	Sogadu Shivanna	BJP	39,101	31.64	S. Shafi Ahmed	INC	29,997	24.27	9,104
Tumkur	58	Kunigal	73.56	S. P. Muddahanumegowda	INC	37,823	38.85	Y. K. Ramaiah	SP	28,666	29.45	9,157
Tumkur	59	Huliyurdurga	73.82	D. Nagarajaiah	JD	41,993	51.45	Ramachandra Prasad	INC	23,128	28.34	18,865
Tumkur	60	Gubbi	78.19	G. S. Shivananjappa	Ind	37,374	40.56	G. S. Basavaraj	INC	28,684	31.13	8,690
Tumkur	61	Turuvekere	78.36	H. B. Nanjegowda	JD	44,384	47.01	M. D. Lakshminarayana	BJP	29,780	31.55	14,604
Tumkur	62	Tiptur	74.85	B. Nanjamari	BJP	43,769	47.11	Annapurnamma Manjunath	INC	27,708	29.82	16,061
Tumkur	63	Chikkanayakanahalli	78.86	N. Basavaiah	KPCC	38,025	43.48	J. C. Madhu Swamy	JD	24,140	27.60	13,885
Kolar	64	Gauribidanur	78.10	Jyothi Reddy N.	JD	42,159	43.38	S. V. Ashwathanarayana Reddy	Ind	34,274	35.27	7,885
Kolar	65	Chikballapur	74.80	M. Shivananda	Ind	39,520	40.93	K. M. Muniyappa	JD	20,544	21.28	18,976
Kolar	66	Sidlaghatta	81.86	V. Muniyappa	INC	45,679	43.21	S. Munishainappa	JD	38,692	36.60	6,987
Kolar	67	Bagepalli	73.88	G. V. Sreerama Reddy	CPI(M)	35,851	40.32	P. N. Padmanabha Rao	INC	29,405	33.07	6,446
Kolar	68	Chintamani	79.19	K. M. Krishna Reddy	JD	52,293	47.58	Chowda Reddy	INC	51,395	46.76	898
Kolar	69	Srinivasapur	85.12	K. R. Ramesh Kumar	JD	52,304	51.10	G. K. Venkatashiva Reddy	INC	48,157	47.05	4,147
Kolar	70	Mulbagal	75.87	R. Srinivas	JD	44,297	41.40	M. V. Venkatappa	INC	39,954	37.34	4,343
Kolar	71	Kolar Gold Field	65.23	S. Rajendiran	BRP	27,271	42.88	M. Backthavachalam	AIADMK	17,862	28.09	9,409
Kolar	72	Bethamangala	71.87	M. Narayanaswamy	JD	43,157	42.05	C. Venkateshappa	Ind	38,483	37.50	4,674
Kolar	73	Kolar	71.60	K. Srinivasa Gowda	JD	40,612	43.91	K. A. Nisar Ahamed	INC	27,790	30.05	12,822
Kolar	74	Vemagal	81.87	C. Byre Gowda	JD	66,049	63.51	V. Venkatamuniyappa	INC	33,001	31.73	33,048
Kolar	75	Malur	79.25	H. B. Dyavarappa	JD	40,828	43.03	A. Nagaraju	INC	37,194	39.20	3,634
Bangalore	76	Malleshwaram	60.35	Anant Nag	JD	43,772	49.10	H. N. Chandrashekara	BJP	19,142	21.47	24,630
Bangalore	77	Rajaji Nagar	59.19	S. Suresh Kumar	BJP	67,175	47.52	R. V. Hareesh	JD	47,677	33.73	19,498
Bangalore	78	Gandhi Nagar	61.27	B. Muniyappa	AIADMK	16,893	27.25	R. Dayananda Rao	INC	14,227	22.95	2,666
Bangalore	79	Chickpet	63.26	Jeevaraj Alva	BJP	14,761	28.27	Perikal M. Mallappa	INC	13,801	26.43	960
Bangalore	80	Binnypet	61.88	V. Somanna	JD	82,354	49.38	Naseer Ahmed	KPCC	32,369	19.41	49,985
Bangalore	81	Chamrajpet	59.41	Pramila Nesargi	BJP	15,665	28.31	R. V. Devaraj	KPCC	14,488	26.18	1,177
Bangalore	82	Basavanagudi	59.28	H. N. Nanje Gowda	BJP	40,013	46.10	Vajramuni	INC	23,077	26.59	16,936
Bangalore	83	Jayanagar	55.60	Ramalinga Reddy	INC	43,215	37.38	K. N. Subba Reddy	BJP	40,656	35.16	2,559
Bangalore	84	Shanti Nagar	50.22	D. G. Hemavathy	JD	21,722	31.29	M. Muniswamy	INC	21,001	30.25	721
Bangalore	85	Shivajinagar	61.16	R. Roshan Baig	JD	22,752	50.52	K. Subramanyam Naidu	BJP	14,074	31.25	8,678
Bangalore	86	Bharathinagar	56.18	N. Rajanna	JD	20,232	33.68	M. J. Victor	INC	11,086	18.45	9,146
Bangalore	87	Jayamahal	54.25	R. Krishnappa	JD	29,011	38.07	S. M. Yahya	INC	26,163	34.33	2,848
Bangalore	88	Yelahanka	54.89	M. H. Jayaprakashanarayan	JD	63,776	32.99	B. Prasanna Kumar	INC	61,755	31.94	2,021
Bangalore	89	Uttarahalli	53.99	M. Srinivas	BJP	144,193	43.02	S. Ramesh	INC	98,315	29.33	45,878
Bangalore	90	Varthur	61.36	Ashwatha Reddy	JD	87,295	51.16	A. Krishnappa	INC	59,085	34.63	28,210
Bangalore	91	Kanakapura	74.52	P. G. R. Sindhia	JD	68,561	70.58	K. T. Channabasavegowda	INC	19,559	20.14	49,002
Bangalore	92	Sathanur	81.14	D. K. Shivakumar	Ind	48,270	46.08	U. K. Swamy	JD	47,702	45.54	568
Bangalore	93	Channapatna	81.52	M. Varade Gowda	JD	67,661	58.54	Sadath Khan	INC	39,428	34.11	28,233
Bangalore	94	Ramanagara	78.84	H. D. Deve Gowda	JD	47,986	43.25	C. M. Lingappa	INC	38,392	34.60	9,594
Bangalore	95	Magadi	76.48	H. C. Balakrishna	BJP	56,735	54.01	H. M. Revanna	INC	42,131	40.11	14,604
Bangalore	96	Nelamangala	72.93	M. Shankar Naik	JD	39,459	42.64	Anjana Murthy	INC	36,408	39.34	3,051
Bangalore	97	Doddaballapur	76.70	R. L. Jalappa	JD	59,764	54.05	V. Krishnappa	INC	37,130	33.58	22,634
Bangalore	98	Devanahalli	77.77	G. Chandranna	JD	67,819	57.55	Muninarasimhaiah	INC	40,160	34.08	27,659
Bangalore	99	Hosakote	79.47	B. N. Bache Gowda	JD	70,517	53.16	Mune Gowda	INC	47,467	35.78	23,050
Bangalore	100	Anekal	74.17	Y. Ramakrishna	BJP	37,999	30.47	M. Ganapathiraja	JD	37,131	29.78	868
Mandya	101	Nagamangala	79.09	L. R. Shivarame Gowda	Ind	44,719	45.41	B. V. Dharanendra Babu	BJP	27,768	28.20	16,951
Mandya	102	Maddur	78.61	M. Mahesh Chand	JD	40,695	40.80	S. M. Krishna	INC	37,231	37.33	3,464
Mandya	103	Kirugavalu	81.91	K. N. Nagegowda	JD	36,348	37.19	B. Basavaraju	INC	28,866	29.54	7,482
Mandya	104	Malavalli	75.08	B. Somashekar	JD	63,808	64.29	Mallajamma	INC	27,435	27.64	36,373
Mandya	105	Mandya	70.83	S. D. Jayaram	JD	57,216	57.95	M. S. Athmananda	INC	27,183	27.53	30,033
Mandya	106	Keragodu	78.61	G. B. Shivakumar	JD	48,124	56.99	M. D. Ramesh Raju	INC	14,838	17.57	33,286
Mandya	107	Shrirangapattana	78.72	Vijayalakshmamma B.	JD	43,062	41.88	K. S. Nanjunde Gowda	Ind	19,635	19.10	23,427
Mandya	108	Pandavapura	79.76	K. S. Puttannaiah	KRRS	43,323	40.71	K. Kempegowda	Ind	30,739	28.88	12,584
Mandya	109	Krishnarajpete	79.01	Krishna	JD	59,841	55.06	K. N. Kengegowda	BJP	22,785	20.97	37,056
Mysore	110	Hanur	76.35	H. Nagappa	JD	65,851	58.36	G. Raju Gouda	INC	45,209	40.07	20,642
Mysore	111	Kollegal	67.39	S. Jayanna	JD	39,568	46.97	G. N. Nanjunda Swamy	BJP	13,988	16.60	25,580
Mysore	112	Bannur	78.59	S. Krishnappa	JD	46,992	48.97	K. M. Chikkamadanaik	INC	34,398	35.85	12,594
Mysore	113	T. Narasipur	71.50	H. C. Mahadevappa	JD	51,874	58.84	M. Sreenivasaiah	INC	20,615	23.38	31,259
Mysore	114	Krishnaraja	55.95	S. A. Ramadas	BJP	28,190	47.55	M. Vedantha Hemmige	JD	18,827	31.76	9,363
Mysore	115	Chamaraja	55.22	H. S. Shankaralinge Gowda	BJP	32,620	40.23	C. Basavegowda	JD	19,937	24.59	12,683
Mysore	116	Narasimharaja	73.25	Maruthi Pawar	BJP	31,592	32.04	Azeez Sait	Ind	30,141	30.57	1,451
Mysore	117	Chamundeshwari	71.76	Siddaramaiah	JD	76,823	54.46	A. S. Guruswamy	INC	44,668	31.67	32,155
Mysore	118	Nanjangud	78.57	D. T. Jayakumar	JD	56,513	60.49	M. Mahadev	INC	27,097	29.00	29,416
Mysore	119	Santhemarahalli	73.57	A. R. Krishnamurthy	JD	39,905	48.12	T. Gopal	BJP	27,652	33.34	12,253
Mysore	120	Chamarajanagar	76.17	Vatal Nagaraj	KCVP	28,334	26.69	S. Puttaswamy	INC	22,352	21.06	5,982
Mysore	121	Gundlupet	80.42	H. S. Mahadeva Prasad	JD	53,724	50.83	C. M. Shivamallappa	INC	29,668	28.07	24,056
Mysore	122	Heggadadevankote	73.60	N. Nagaraju	JD	41,208	39.64	Kote M. Shivanna	INC	40,182	38.66	1,026
Mysore	123	Hunasuru	78.45	C. H. Vijayashankar	BJP	35,973	31.04	V. Papanna	JD	33,122	28.58	2,851
Mysore	124	Krishnarajanagara	79.85	S. Nanjappa	JD	51,014	48.13	H. Vishwanatha	INC	49,707	46.89	1,307
Mysore	125	Periyapatna	79.08	K. Venkatesh	JD	53,111	45.92	K. S. Kalamarigowda	INC	34,326	29.68	18,785
Kodagu	126	Virajpet	60.07	H. D. Basavaraju	BJP	21,790	35.87	Suma Vasantha	INC	20,009	32.93	1,781
Kodagu	127	Madikeri	68.40	Subbaya Dambekodi	BJP	33,306	44.12	T. P. Ramesh	JD	22,154	29.35	11,152
Kodagu	128	Somwarpet	73.85	Appachu Ranjan	BJP	33,195	35.81	B. A. Jivijaya	JD	31,267	33.73	1,928
Hassan	129	Belur	67.85	H. K. Kumaraswamy	JD	24,927	30.76	S. H. Puttaranganath	Ind	22,974	28.35	1,953
Hassan	130	Arsikere	71.27	G. S. Parameshwarappa	JD	31,845	32.52	Haranahalli Ramaswamy	INC	29,113	29.73	2,732
Hassan	131	Gandasi	79.20	B. Shivaramu	Ind	53,002	51.70	E. Nanje Gowda	JD	42,070	41.04	10,932
Hassan	132	Shravanabelagola	74.76	C. S. Putte Gowda	JD	66,906	53.28	H. C. Srikantaiah	INC	45,871	36.53	21,035
Hassan	133	Holenarasipur	82.34	H. D. Revanna	JD	47,606	43.00	G. Puttaswamy Gowda	INC	47,484	42.89	122
Hassan	134	Arkalgud	77.97	A. T. Ramaswamy	INC	38,222	39.21	A. Manju	BJP	32,181	33.01	6,041
Hassan	135	Hassan	66.62	H. S. Prakash	JD	55,121	49.46	K. H. Hanume Gowda	INC	42,658	38.28	12,463
Hassan	136	Sakleshpur	72.94	B. B. Shivappa	BJP	40,761	40.28	J. D. Somappa	INC	29,852	29.50	10,909
Dakshina Kannada	137	Sullia	77.63	S. Angara	BJP	52,113	51.21	K. Kushala	INC	37,069	36.43	15,044
Dakshina Kannada	138	Puttur	79.27	Sadananda Gowda	BJP	53,015	48.59	Vinay Kumar Sorake	INC	52,611	48.22	404
Dakshina Kannada	139	Vittal	74.84	A. Rukmayya Poojari	BJP	41,627	43.47	H. Ramayya Naik	JD	34,507	36.03	7,120
Dakshina Kannada	140	Belthangady	77.01	K. Vasantha Bangera	JD	39,871	38.51	K. Prabhakara Bangera	BJP	32,433	31.33	7,438
Dakshina Kannada	141	Bantval	71.69	Ramanath Rai	INC	34,027	44.28	Shakunthala T. Shetty	BJP	29,734	38.69	4,293
Dakshina Kannada	142	Mangalore	63.13	N. Yogish Bhat	BJP	25,106	43.45	Blasius D'Souza	INC	17,130	29.65	7,976
Dakshina Kannada	143	Ullal	63.72	K. Jayarama Shetty	BJP	24,412	32.26	K. S. Mohammed Massod	INC	18,817	24.86	5,595
Dakshina Kannada	144	Surathkal	63.07	Kumble Sundara Rao	BJP	29,589	35.51	Vijaya Shetty	INC	25,587	30.71	4,002
Dakshina Kannada	145	Kapu	66.01	Vasanth V. Salian	INC	17,152	27.78	Lalaji R. Mendon	BJP	15,578	25.23	1,574
Dakshina Kannada	146	Udupi	66.08	U. R. Sabhapathi	KPCC	29,649	37.78	Manorama Madhwaraj	INC	24,831	31.64	4,818
Dakshina Kannada	147	Brahmavar	68.50	K. Jayaprakash Hegde	JD	38,633	46.34	P. Basavaraj	INC	25,757	30.89	12,876
Dakshina Kannada	148	Kundapura	66.91	K. Prathapachandra Shetty	INC	41,209	45.21	A. G. Kodgi	BJP	37,770	41.43	3,439
Dakshina Kannada	149	Byndoor	65.35	I. M. Jayarama Shetty	BJP	29,841	37.47	Mani Gopal	INC	18,541	23.28	11,300
Dakshina Kannada	150	Karkala	70.09	Veerappa Moily	INC	36,068	46.64	K. P. Shenoy	BJP	19,558	25.29	16,510
Dakshina Kannada	151	Moodabidri	70.56	K. Amarnath Shetty	JD	33,319	47.49	K. Somappa Suvarna	INC	19,620	27.96	13,699
Chikmagalur	152	Sringeri	71.84	H. G. Govinde Gowda	JD	35,991	40.98	D. N. Jeevaraj	BJP	27,939	31.81	8,052
Chikmagalur	153	Mudigere	66.07	B. B. Ningaiah	JD	31,773	41.68	C. Motamma	INC	28,604	37.53	3,169
Chikmagalur	154	Chikmagalur	65.19	C. R. Sageer Ahamed	INC	19,823	25.39	B. K. Sundresh	CPI	18,841	24.13	982
Chikmagalur	155	Birur	71.12	S. R. Lakshmaiah	JD	35,535	43.97	N. K. Huchappa	INC	21,815	26.99	13,720
Chikmagalur	156	Kadur	75.01	K. M. Krishnamurthy	JD	56,018	62.70	M. Veerabhadrappa	INC	24,762	27.71	31,256
Chikmagalur	157	Tarikere	74.62	S. M. Nagaraju	Ind	33,769	35.26	B. R. Neelakantappa	JD	33,212	34.68	557
Shimoga	158	Channagiri	73.93	J. H. Patel	JD	38,178	40.95	N. G. Halappa	INC	19,047	20.43	19,131
Shimoga	159	Holehonnur	72.97	G. Basavannappa	JD	24,999	26.04	Kariyanna	INC	23,174	24.14	1,825
Shimoga	160	Bhadravati	70.35	M. J. Appaji Gowda	Ind	41,660	44.12	B. P. Shivakumar	JD	20,412	21.62	21,248
Shimoga	161	Honnali	76.73	H. B. Krishnamurthy	KPCC	34,893	32.50	D. G. Basavana Gowda	Ind	32,889	30.64	2,004
Shimoga	162	Shimoga	67.10	K. S. Eshwarappa	BJP	57,385	52.16	K. H. Srinivasa	INC	41,219	37.47	16,166
Shimoga	163	Tirthahalli	76.05	Araga Jnanendra	BJP	31,440	35.61	D. B. Chandregowda	JD	28,488	32.26	2,952
Shimoga	164	Hosanagar	76.04	Ayanur Manjunath	BJP	25,505	24.52	G. Nanjundappa	JD	24,878	23.92	627
Shimoga	165	Sagar	73.89	Kagodu Thimmappa	INC	32,271	35.19	H. V. Chandrashekar	JD	23,059	25.15	9,212
Shimoga	166	Soraba	78.89	Sarekoppa Bangarappa	KPCC	45,641	51.95	Chandrappa Basur	Ind	27,171	30.93	18,470
Shimoga	167	Shikaripura	77.76	B. S. Yediyurappa	BJP	50,885	50.13	Mahadevappa Nagarada	INC	22,200	21.87	28,685
Uttara Kannada	168	Sirsi	73.55	Premanand Jaiwani	JD	26,758	27.88	Viveknand Vaidya	BJP	24,972	26.02	1,786
Uttara Kannada	169	Bhatkal	69.35	U. Chittaranjan	BJP	45,308	50.55	Laxmi Naik	INC	22,931	25.59	22,377
Uttara Kannada	170	Kumta	69.31	M. P. Karki	BJP	29,379	34.06	Dinakar Keshav Shetty	JD	25,136	29.14	4,243
Uttara Kannada	171	Ankola	73.37	Vishweshwar Hegde Kageri	BJP	28,285	34.13	Pramod Hegde	JD	23,683	28.58	4,602
Uttara Kannada	172	Karwar	63.36	Vasanth Asnotikar	KPCC	33,367	48.46	Prabhakar S. Rane	INC	22,715	32.99	10,652
Uttara Kannada	173	Haliyal	73.85	R. V. Deshpande	JD	62,722	57.69	S. K. Gouda	INC	29,953	27.55	32,769
Dharwad	174	Dharwad Rural	70.87	Shrikant Ambadagatti	INC	25,054	30.19	A. B. Desai	JD	21,812	26.28	3,242
Dharwad	175	Dharwad	53.90	Chandrakant Bellad	BJP	26,630	33.00	Mahadev Horatti	INC	17,114	21.21	9,516
Dharwad	176	Hubli City	70.35	Ashok Katwe	BJP	42,244	51.78	A. M. Hindasageri	INC	34,103	41.80	8,141
Dharwad	177	Hubli Rural	62.13	Jagadish Shettar	BJP	42,768	39.86	Basavaraj Bommai	JD	26,794	24.97	15,974
Dharwad	178	Kalghatgi	76.05	Siddanagouda Chanaveeranagouda	JD	25,392	29.56	Marutirao Yadav	KRRS	14,718	17.13	10,674
Dharwad	179	Kundgol	71.19	M. S. Akki	JD	32,707	42.01	C. S. Shivalli	KPCC	19,034	24.45	13,673
Dharwad	180	Shiggaon	70.59	Manjunath Kunnur	INC	23,552	25.89	Abdulgani Koitewale	Ind	17,778	19.54	5,774
Dharwad	181	Hangal	79.68	C. M. Udasi	JD	56,348	55.16	Manohar Tahasildar	INC	38,865	38.05	17,483
Dharwad	182	Hirekerur	71.25	U. B. Banakar	BJP	32,248	35.63	B. H. Bannikod	JD	22,855	25.25	9,393
Dharwad	183	Ranibennur	69.97	Veerappa Karjagi	JD	53,080	56.76	K. B. Koliwad	INC	28,542	30.52	24,538
Dharwad	184	Byadgi	69.85	Kallokappa Beelagi	JD	29,905	38.20	Rudrappa Lamani	INC	27,045	34.55	2,860
Dharwad	185	Haveri	71.81	Basavaraj Shivannanavar	JD	55,806	59.09	Rajashekhar Mahavi	INC	23,086	24.44	32,720
Dharwad	186	Shirahatti	71.13	Ganganna Mahantashettar	JD	26,449	34.30	Gulappa Upanal	Ind	23,637	30.66	2,812
Dharwad	187	Mundargi	69.09	Shidlinganagouda Patil	JD	21,145	27.48	Yallanagouda Goudar	Ind	14,706	19.11	6,439
Dharwad	188	Gadag	61.61	D. R. Patil	INC	44,388	55.50	Bistappa Dandin	JD	19,971	24.97	24,417
Dharwad	189	Ron	69.04	Shrishailappa Bidarur	JD	39,268	51.41	Gurupadagouda Patil	INC	30,664	40.14	8,604
Dharwad	190	Nargund	68.59	B. R. Yavagal	JD	37,154	56.03	V. A. Mattikatti	INC	18,502	27.90	18,652
Dharwad	191	Navalgund	66.34	Kallappa Gaddi	KPCC	13,998	20.48	Mallappa Kulkarni	INC	10,650	15.58	3,348
Belagavi	192	Ramdurg	68.64	Basavantappa Hireraddi	JD	34,063	38.88	Rudragouda Patil	INC	12,767	14.57	21,296
Belagavi	193	Parasgad	72.47	Chandrashekhar Mamani	JD	49,568	50.44	S. S. Koujalagi	INC	39,050	39.74	10,518
Belagavi	194	Bailhongal	73.24	Shivanand Koujalagi	JD	43,562	52.78	Shivabasappa Gadataranavar	INC	14,751	17.87	28,811
Belagavi	195	Kittur	77.05	D. B. Inamdar	INC	35,600	38.61	Babagouda Patil	KRRS	27,924	30.28	7,676
Belagavi	196	Khanapur	69.90	Ashok Patil	Ind	40,619	47.00	Mallikarjun B. Wali	KRRS	13,010	15.05	27,609
Belagavi	197	Belagavi City	56.47	Narayan Rao Tarale	Ind	35,515	44.79	Anil Potdar	Ind	24,689	31.13	10,826
Belagavi	198	Uchagaon	57.04	Basavant Patil	Ind	41,416	48.12	Yuvaraj Kadam	INC	16,096	18.70	25,320
Belagavi	199	Hire Bagewadi	71.76	Shivaputrappa Malagi	JD	26,529	29.10	Govind Astekar	Ind	21,125	23.17	5,404
Belagavi	200	Gokak	67.89	Chandrashekhar Naik	JD	37,891	44.64	Shankar Karaning	INC	24,741	29.15	13,150
Belagavi	201	Arabhavi	70.81	Veeranna Koujalgi	INC	50,866	48.63	Pratibha Patil	JD	32,686	31.25	18,180
Belagavi	202	Hukkeri	76.96	Umesh Katti	JD	39,294	49.55	Shashikanth Akkappa Naik	KRRS	16,231	20.47	23,063
Belagavi	203	Sankeshwar	75.51	Appayyagouda Patil	JD	39,885	47.81	Madhukar Nalawade	INC	23,172	27.77	16,713
Belagavi	204	Nippani	72.78	Subhash Joshi	JD	30,612	36.75	Veerkumar Patil	INC	29,017	34.84	1,595
Belagavi	205	Sadalga	77.19	Prakash Hukkeri	INC	42,705	48.18	Kallappa Magennavar	JD	35,591	40.15	7,114
Belagavi	206	Chikkodi	61.73	Balasaheb Waddar	JD	44,491	60.30	Omprakash Kanagali	INC	20,378	27.62	24,113
Belagavi	207	Raibag	59.01	Shama Ghatage	INC	32,297	35.77	Dundappa Murgod	JD	25,008	27.70	7,289
Belagavi	208	Kagwad	69.71	Mohan Shaha	JD	42,514	52.42	Annarao Jakanur	INC	25,670	31.65	16,844
Belagavi	209	Athani	59.06	Leeladevi R. Prasad	JD	27,126	34.35	Irappa Shedashyal	INC	20,313	25.73	6,813
Bijapur	210	Jamkhandi	68.00	Ramappa Kaluti	INC	42,505	41.04	Gurupadappa Bagalkot	JD	41,011	39.59	1,494
Bijapur	211	Bilgi	68.34	J. T. Patil	INC	33,424	36.00	Gangadhar Yalligutti	JD	21,877	23.56	11,547
Bijapur	212	Mudhol	69.09	Govind Karjol	JD	43,613	47.69	R. B. Timmapur	INC	20,416	22.32	23,197
Bijapur	213	Bagalkot	66.76	Ajay Sarnaik	JD	24,895	32.01	Pralhad Pujar	BJP	19,019	24.45	5,876
Bijapur	214	Badami	69.50	B. B. Chimmanakatti	INC	27,354	34.16	Mahagundappa Pattanshetty	JD	25,956	32.42	1,398
Bijapur	215	Guledgud	66.04	H. Y. Meti	JD	26,549	35.59	Rajashekhar Sheelavant	BJP	22,093	29.62	4,456
Bijapur	216	Hungund	63.39	Shivashankarappa Kashappanavar	INC	25,288	35.56	Gavishidhanagouda Patil	JD	23,108	32.50	2,180
Bijapur	217	Muddebihal	64.22	Vimalabai Deshmukh	JD	39,149	55.10	C. S. Nadagouda	INC	21,756	30.62	17,393
Bijapur	218	Huvina Hippargi	61.11	Shivputrappa Desai	JD	35,849	49.12	B. S. Patil	INC	23,422	32.09	12,427
Bijapur	219	Basavana Bagevadi	62.37	Somanagouda Patil	INC	27,557	35.63	Kumaragouda Patil	JD	19,270	24.91	8,287
Bijapur	220	Tikota	66.75	Shivanand Patil	JD	50,679	63.98	M. B. Patil	INC	25,897	32.69	24,782
Bijapur	221	Bijapur	58.23	Basangouda Patil Yatnal	BJP	45,286	49.38	Habib Maktumpatel	JD	29,158	31.80	16,128
Bijapur	222	Ballolli	60.07	Ramesh Jigajinagi	JD	29,018	37.74	Phoolsing Chavan	INC	17,591	22.88	11,427
Bijapur	223	Indi	59.45	Ravikant Patil	Ind	23,200	30.49	Basagondappa Patil	JD	19,469	25.59	3,731
Bijapur	224	Sindagi	56.16	M. C. Managuli	JD	45,356	59.56	Rayagondappa Choudhari	INC	17,137	22.51	28,219
