= Bellary Assembly constituency =

Former Legislative Assembly constituency in Karnataka, India

Coordinates: 15.15°N 76.92°E

Bellary
- Former constituency for the Karnataka Legislative Assembly

Constituency details
- Country: India
- Region: South India
- State: Karnataka
- District: Bellary
- Lok Sabha constituency: Bellary
- Established: 1951
- Abolished: 2008

Bellary Assembly constituency was one of the 224 seats in Karnataka State Assembly in India. It was part of Bellary Lok Sabha constituency. The constituency was split as Bellary Rural and Bellary City after the 2008 delimitation.

== Members of the Legislative Assembly ==
Election	Member	Party
1952	Mundlur Gangappa	Independent politician
1956 By-election	H. S. Gouda	Independent politician
1957	Mundlur Gangappa	Independent politician
1962	T. G. Sathyanarayan	Indian National Congress
1967	V. Nagappa	Swatantra Party
1972	V. Nagappa	Indian National Congress
1978	K. Bhasker Naidu	Indian National Congress
1983	M. Ramappa	Janata Party
1985	M. Ramappa	Indian National Congress
1989	M. Ramappa	Indian National Congress
1994	M. Divakar Babu	Independent politician
1999	M. Divakar Babu	Indian National Congress
2004	B. Sriramulu	Bharatiya Janata Party

== Election results ==
=== Assembly Election 2004 ===
2004 Karnataka Legislative Assembly election : Bellary
Party	Candidate	Votes	%	±%
BJP	B. Sriramulu	53,354	47.29%	▲3.05
INC	M. Divakar Babu	46,643	41.34%	▼11.40
JD(S)	Sirigeri Pannaraj	6,515	5.77%	New
BSP	Mundargi Nagaraja	3,801	3.37%	New
Margin of victory		6,711	5.95%	▼2.55
Turnout		112,835	52.67%	▼8.45
Total valid votes		112,817		
Registered electors		214,232		▲19.87
BJP gain from INC		Swing	▼5.45	

=== Assembly Election 1999 ===
1999 Karnataka Legislative Assembly election : Bellary
Party	Candidate	Votes	%	±%
INC	M. Divakar Babu	55,441	52.74%	▲32.37
BJP	B. Sriramulu	46,508	44.24%	▲30.48
Independent	P. Valli Sab	989	0.94%	New
Independent	Sayyed Karimulla	726	0.69%	New
Independent	K. Somashekar	721	0.69%	New
Margin of victory		8,933	8.50%	▼18.46
Turnout		109,244	61.12%	▲5.58
Total valid votes		105,126		
Rejected ballots		4,050	3.71%	▲1.18
Registered electors		178,723		▲13.96
INC gain from Independent		Swing	▲5.41	

=== Assembly Election 1994 ===
1994 Karnataka Legislative Assembly election : Bellary
Party	Candidate	Votes	%	±%
Independent	M. Divakar Babu	40,156	47.33%	New
INC	Venkat Mahipal	17,280	20.37%	▼14.44
BJP	S. Indu Sekhar	11,678	13.76%	New
INC	Syed Mujeeb	9,250	10.90%	New
Independent	N. D. Kamalakar	1,703	2.01%	New
JD	G. Ramachandraiah	1,522	1.79%	▼11.90
Independent	K. Somasekhar	855	1.01%	New
Independent	A. Eswarappa	782	0.92%	New
Margin of victory		22,876	26.96%	▲20.55
Turnout		87,106	55.54%	▲2.14
Total valid votes		84,850		
Rejected ballots		2,208	2.53%	▼6.98
Registered electors		156,825		▼1.58
Independent gain from INC		Swing	▲12.52	

=== Assembly Election 1989 ===
1989 Karnataka Legislative Assembly election : Bellary
Party	Candidate	Votes	%	±%
INC	M. Ramappa	26,802	34.81%	▼5.93
Independent	Pannaraj	21,869	28.40%	New
Independent	K. Bhasker Naidu	10,565	13.72%	New
JD	M. Ravi Prasad	10,538	13.69%	New
JP	Abdul Azeez	2,884	3.75%	New
CPI	Sharda Maiebennor	2,273	2.95%	▼32.55
Independent	P. Veeresh	970	1.26%	New
Margin of victory		4,933	6.41%	▲1.17
Turnout		85,088	53.40%	▲11.05
Total valid votes		76,995		
Rejected ballots		8,093	9.51%	▲7.03
Registered electors		159,347		▲30.86
INC hold		Swing	▼5.93	

=== Assembly Election 1985 ===
1985 Karnataka Legislative Assembly election : Bellary
Party	Candidate	Votes	%	±%
INC	M. Ramappa	20,485	40.74%	▼1.96
CPI	Sharada Male Bennur	17,852	35.50%	New
Independent	Sabjan	7,089	14.10%	New
BJP	Y. Changalappa	2,701	5.37%	▼0.31
Independent	V. H. Bhaskar	965	1.92%	New
Independent	P. Valli Sab	490	0.97%	New
Independent	Ramalinganagoud	383	0.76%	New
Margin of victory		2,633	5.24%	▼2.14
Turnout		51,564	42.35%	▼16.26
Total valid votes		50,286		
Rejected ballots		1,278	2.48%	▼0.41
Registered electors		121,770		▲14.37
INC gain from JP		Swing	▼9.34	

=== Assembly Election 1983 ===
1983 Karnataka Legislative Assembly election : Bellary
Party	Candidate	Votes	%	±%
JP	M. Ramappa	30,350	50.08%	▲10.47
INC	Raja Saheb	25,876	42.70%	▲31.50
BJP	Y. Changalappa	3,440	5.68%	New
Independent	N. V. Prakash Rao	931	1.54%	New
Margin of victory		4,474	7.38%	▼1.54
Turnout		62,398	58.61%	▼2.26
Total valid votes		60,597		
Rejected ballots		1,801	2.89%	▲0.32
Registered electors		106,470		▲18.28
JP gain from INC(I)		Swing	▲1.55	

=== Assembly Election 1978 ===
1978 Karnataka Legislative Assembly election : Bellary
Party	Candidate	Votes	%	±%
INC(I)	K. Bhasker Naidu	25,911	48.53%	New
JP	Abdul Huq	21,147	39.61%	New
INC	V. Nagappa	5,981	11.20%	▼33.05
Independent	P. Valli Sab	348	0.65%	New
Margin of victory		4,764	8.92%	▲3.46
Turnout		54,793	60.87%	▼2.54
Total valid votes		53,387		
Rejected ballots		1,406	2.57%	▲2.57
Registered electors		90,018		▲5.62
INC(I) gain from INC(O)		Swing	▼1.18	

=== Assembly Election 1972 ===
1972 Mysore State Legislative Assembly election : Bellary
Party	Candidate	Votes	%	±%
INC(O)	V. Nagappa	25,866	49.71%	New
INC	K. Bhasker Naidu	23,024	44.25%	▲16.57
ABJS	S. Rajagopal Chetty	1,713	3.29%	New
Independent	N. A. Nabi	1,072	2.06%	New
Margin of victory		2,842	5.46%	▼29.45
Turnout		54,042	63.41%	▼2.58
Total valid votes		52,037		
Registered electors		85,230		▲22.56
INC(O) gain from SWA		Swing	▼12.88	

=== Assembly Election 1967 ===
1967 Mysore State Legislative Assembly election : Bellary
Party	Candidate	Votes	%	±%
SWA	V. Nagappa	27,052	62.59%	▲15.97
INC	T. G. Sathyanarayan	11,963	27.68%	▼24.00
People's Front India	A. Maebennur	2,822	6.53%	New
Independent	N. A. N. Sab	1,382	3.20%	New
Margin of victory		15,089	34.91%	▲29.85
Turnout		45,889	65.99%	▲13.09
Total valid votes		43,219		
Registered electors		69,539		▲5.11
SWA gain from INC		Swing	▲10.91	

=== Assembly Election 1962 ===
1962 Mysore State Legislative Assembly election : Bellary
Party	Candidate	Votes	%	±%
INC	T. G. Sathyanarayan	17,250	51.68%	▲8.29
SWA	R. A. Subhan	15,560	46.62%	New
Independent	T. Sreenivasa Murthy	567	1.70%	New
Margin of victory		1,690	5.06%	▼5.27
Turnout		34,998	52.90%	▼7.93
Total valid votes		33,377		
Registered electors		66,161		▲16.53
INC gain from Independent		Swing	▼2.03	

=== Assembly Election 1957 ===
1957 Mysore State Legislative Assembly election : Bellary
Party	Candidate	Votes	%	±%
Independent	Mundlur Gangappa	18,551	53.71%	New
INC	Abdur Razack Sab	14,984	43.39%	New
Independent	A. C. J. Dasen Solomon	1,002	2.90%	New
Margin of victory		3,567	10.33%	▲5.73
Turnout		34,537	60.83%	
Total valid votes		34,537		
Registered electors		56,776		
Independent hold		Swing	▲1.41	

=== Assembly By-election 1956 ===
1956 Mysore State Legislative Assembly by-election : Bellary
Party	Candidate	Votes	%	±%
Independent	H. S. Goud	31,708	52.30%	New
Independent	Mundlur Gangappa	28,917	47.70%	New
Margin of victory		2,791	4.60%	▼0.54
Total valid votes		60,625		
Independent hold		Swing	▲8.93	

=== Assembly Election 1952 ===
1952 Madras State Legislative Assembly election : Bellary
Party	Candidate	Votes	%	±%
Independent	Mundlur Gangappa	19,534	43.37%	New
INC	A. Sumangalamma	17,219	38.23%	New
Independent	Abdul Hameed	3,274	7.27%	New
Socialist Party (India)	Gurubasappa	3,193	7.09%	New
KMPP	Seshagiri Rao	1,817	4.03%	New
Margin of victory		2,315	5.14%	
Turnout		45,037	60.04%	
Total valid votes		45,037		
Registered electors		75,016		
Independent win (new seat)				

== See also ==
- List of constituencies of Karnataka Legislative Assembly
