= Bellary Rural Assembly constituency =

Legislative Assembly constituency in Karnataka, India

Coordinates: 15.15°N 76.92°E

Bellary
- Constituency No. 93 for the Karnataka Legislative Assembly

Constituency details
- Country: India
- Region: South India
- State: Karnataka
- District: Bellary
- Lok Sabha constituency: Bellary
- Established: 2008
- Total electors: 238,361
- Reservation: ST

Member of Legislative Assembly
- 16th Karnataka Legislative Assembly
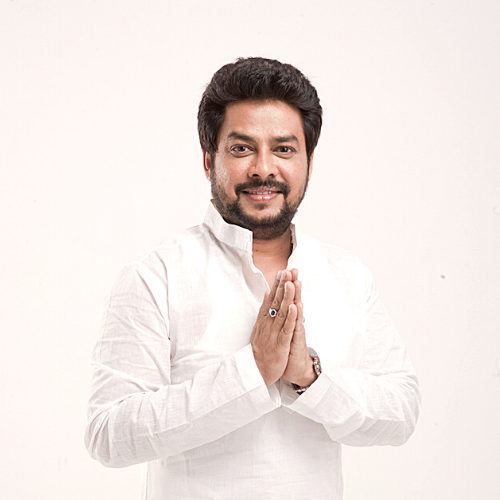
- Incumbent B. Nagendra
- Party: Indian National Congress
- Elected year: 2023
- Preceded by: N. Y. Gopalakrishna

Bellary Rural Assembly constituency (or just Bellary) is one of the 224 seats in the Karnataka State Assembly in India. It is part of Bellary Lok Sabha constituency. The constituency has been reserved for Scheduled Tribes since the 2008 delimitation. It is a stronghold of B. Sriramulu. It consists of 11 wards of Bellary City. The areas Cowl Bazar, TB Sanatorium, and Contonment belong to this constituency. It has both urban and rural voters.

== Geographical scope ==
The constituency comprises ward nos. 4, 25, 26, 27, 28, 29, 31, 32, 33, 34, 35 of Ballari Municipal Corporation lying in Ballari taluka. Urban voters in Bellary (ST) assembly were 85,124 which was 38% in the 2011 census; rural voters were 138,887 which was around 62%.

== Members of the Legislative Assembly ==
Election	Member	Party
2008	B. Sriramulu	Bharatiya Janata Party
2011^ (Note: Resigned on 13 October 2011)	B. Sriramulu	Independent politician
2013	B. Sriramulu	Badavara Shramikara Raitara Congress
2014 By-election (Note: Resigned on 19 March 2014)	N. Y. Gopalakrishna	Indian National Congress
2018	B. Nagendra	Indian National Congress
2023	B. Nagendra	Indian National Congress

^ By-election

== Election results ==
=== Assembly Election 2023 ===
2023 Karnataka Legislative Assembly election : Bellary Rural
Party	Candidate	Votes	%	±%
INC	B. Nagendra	103,836	56.84	▲8.30
BJP	B. Sriramulu	74,536	40.80	▼6.10
NOTA	None of the above	1,142	0.63	▼0.41
Margin of victory		29,300	16.04	▲14.40
Turnout		182,815	76.70	▲1.99
Total valid votes		182,692		
Registered electors		238,361		▲8.70
INC hold		Swing	▲8.30	

=== Assembly Election 2018 ===
2018 Karnataka Legislative Assembly election : Bellary Rural
Party	Candidate	Votes	%	±%
INC	B. Nagendra	79,186	48.54	▼12.77
BJP	Sanna Pakkirappa	76,507	46.90	▲9.78
JD(S)	D. Ramesh	3,212	1.97	New
NOTA	None of the above	1,695	1.04	▲0.17
Margin of victory		2,679	1.64	▼22.55
Turnout		163,834	74.71	▲1.41
Total valid votes		163,128		
Registered electors		219,291		▲16.44
INC hold		Swing	▼12.77	

=== Assembly By-election 2014 ===
2014 Karnataka Legislative Assembly by-election : Bellary Rural
Party	Candidate	Votes	%	±%
INC	N. Y. Gopalakrishna	83,906	61.31	▲26.52
BJP	Obalesh	51,802	37.12	▲35.05
NOTA	None of the above	1,190	0.87	New
Parcham Party of India	B. Raghu	1,144	0.84	New
Margin of victory		33,104	24.19	▼3.68
Turnout		138,048	73.30	▼1.98
Total valid votes		136,858		
Registered electors		188,336		▲8.79
INC gain from BSRCP		Swing	▼1.34	

=== Assembly Election 2013 ===
2013 Karnataka Legislative Assembly election : Bellary Rural
Party	Candidate	Votes	%	±%
BSRCP	B. Sriramulu	74,854	62.65	New
INC	Asundi Vannurappa	41,560	34.79	▲12.31
JD(S)	Meenalli Tayanna	3,958	3.31	New
BJP	Hulugappa Ponnuru	2,478	2.07	▼12.01
KJP	Pandu Byalachinte	2,347	1.96	New
Margin of victory		33,294	27.87	▼10.06
Turnout		130,320	75.28	▲3.62
Total valid votes		119,471		
Registered electors		173,111		▲0.54
BSRCP gain from Independent		Swing	▲2.24	

=== Assembly By-election 2011 ===
2011 Karnataka Legislative Assembly by-election : Bellary Rural
Party	Candidate	Votes	%	±%
Independent	B. Sriramulu	74,527	60.41	New
INC	B. Ramprasad	27,737	22.48	▼10.43
BJP	Gadilimgappa	17,366	14.08	▼42.15
Independent	B. Ramprasad	1,116	0.90	New
Margin of victory		46,790	37.93	▲14.60
Turnout		123,381	71.66	▲11.82
Total valid votes		123,369		
Registered electors		172,173		▼6.59
Independent gain from BJP		Swing	▲4.18	

=== Assembly Election 2008 ===
2008 Karnataka Legislative Assembly election : Bellary Rural
Party	Candidate	Votes	%	±%
BJP	B. Sriramulu	61,991	56.23	New
INC	B. Ramprasad	36,275	32.91	New
JD(S)	K. Chennappa	5,207	4.72	New
Independent	Dodda Govinda	2,593	2.35	New
Independent	Jaliyal Rudrappa	1,580	1.43	New
BSP	B. Srinivasa	1,522	1.38	New
Independent	Devadas	1,071	0.97	New
Margin of victory		25,716	23.33	
Turnout		110,300	59.84	
Total valid votes		110,239		
Registered electors		184,316		
BJP win (new seat)				

== See also ==
- List of constituencies of Karnataka Legislative Assembly
