= Kudligi Assembly constituency =

Legislative Assembly constituency in Karnataka State, India

Coordinates: 14.9°N 76.39°E

Kudligi
- Constituency No. 96 for the Karnataka Legislative Assembly

Constituency details
- Country: India
- Region: South India
- State: Karnataka
- Division: Kalaburagi
- District: Vijayanagara Before, Bellary district
- Lok Sabha constituency: Bellary
- Established: 1951
- Total electors: 203,802
- Reservation: ST

Member of Legislative Assembly
- 16th Karnataka Legislative Assembly
- Incumbent N. T. Srinivas
- Party: INC
- Elected year: 2023
- Preceded by: N. Y. Gopalakrishna

Kudligi Assembly constituency is one of the 224 Legislative Assembly constituencies of Karnataka in India.

It was part of Bellary district until 2 October 2021. After 2 October 2021, it became part of Vijayanagara district.

N. T. Srinivas is the current MLA from Kudligi.

== Members of the Legislative Assembly ==
Election	Member	Party
1952	Kotrabasavana Goud	Independent politician
1962	V. Nagappa	Independent politician
1967	M. M. J. Sadyojatha	Indian National Congress
1972	B. S. Veerabhadrappa	Indian National Congress
1978	T. Somappa	Indian National Congress
1983	K. Channabasavana Gowd	Janata Party
1985	N. T. Bommanna	Indian National Congress
1989	N. T. Bommanna	Indian National Congress
1994	N. M. Nabisahib	Janata Dal
1999	Siraj Sheikh	Indian National Congress
2004	Anil Lad	Bharatiya Janata Party
2008	B. Nagendra	Bharatiya Janata Party
2013	B. Nagendra	Independent politician
2018	N. Y. Gopalakrishna	Bharatiya Janata Party
2023	N. T. Srinivas	Indian National Congress

== Election results ==
=== Assembly Election 2023 ===
2023 Karnataka Legislative Assembly election : Kudligi
Party	Candidate	Votes	%	±%
INC	N. T. Srinivas	104,753	63.95	▲48.62
BJP	Lokesh. V. Nayaka	50,403	30.77	▼2.16
JD(S)	Pujar Bheemappa	3,138	1.92	▼23.90
CPI	H. Veeranna	1,513	0.92	▼1.32
AAP	Srinivas. N	1,341	0.82	New
NOTA	None of the above	804	0.49	▼0.86
Margin of victory		54,350	33.18	▲26.07
Turnout		163,862	80.40	▲3.43
Total valid votes		163,810		
Registered electors		203,802		▲2.82
INC gain from BJP		Swing	▲31.02	

=== Assembly Election 2018 ===
2018 Karnataka Legislative Assembly election : Kudligi
Party	Candidate	Votes	%	±%
BJP	N. Y. Gopalakrishna	50,085	32.93	▲31.33
JD(S)	N. T. Bommanna	39,272	25.82	▲25.16
Independent	Lokesh. V. Nayaka	29,514	19.41	New
INC	Raghu Gujjal	23,316	15.33	▼13.06
CPI	H. Veeranna	3,414	2.24	New
NOTA	None of the above	2,055	1.35	New
Sarva Janata Party	Basappa. N	1,412	0.93	New
AIMEP	H. P. Sharanappa	1,035	0.68	New
Independent	Mahadevappa	1,016	0.67	New
Margin of victory		10,813	7.11	▼7.98
Turnout		152,567	76.97	▼1.03
Total valid votes		152,076		
Registered electors		198,220		▲16.25
BJP gain from Independent		Swing	▼10.54	

=== Assembly Election 2013 ===
2013 Karnataka Legislative Assembly election : Kudligi
Party	Candidate	Votes	%	±%
Independent	B. Nagendra	71,477	43.47	New
INC	S. Venkatesh	46,674	28.39	▼12.33
BJP	Ramappa	2,632	1.60	▼46.92
Independent	G. Nataraja	2,321	1.41	New
Independent	B. Subhash Chandra	2,181	1.33	New
KJP	Dr. K. Tarasalappa	1,628	0.99	New
ANC	D. Karunesh	1,135	0.69	New
JD(S)	G. Karappa	1,078	0.66	▼1.88
Independent	Basavaraj. N	1,012	0.62	New
Margin of victory		24,803	15.09	▲7.29
Turnout		133,001	78.00	▲6.13
Total valid votes		164,413		
Registered electors		170,516		▲9.21
Independent gain from BJP		Swing	▼5.05	

=== Assembly Election 2008 ===
2008 Karnataka Legislative Assembly election : Kudligi
Party	Candidate	Votes	%	±%
BJP	B. Nagendra	54,443	48.52	▼0.36
INC	S. Venkatesh	45,686	40.72	▲6.08
CPI	G. Honnurappa	2,924	2.61	New
JD(S)	Raju. C	2,849	2.54	▼7.59
Independent	B. Srinivas	2,387	2.13	New
BSP	Basamma	1,495	1.33	▼0.10
Independent	Doddamani Raghavendra	923	0.82	New
Independent	T. Shivaprakash	803	0.72	New
Independent	H. P. Sharanappa	693	0.62	New
Margin of victory		8,757	7.80	▼6.44
Turnout		112,216	71.87	▼1.98
Total valid votes		112,203		
Registered electors		156,135		▼4.59
BJP hold		Swing	▼0.36	

=== Assembly Election 2004 ===
2004 Karnataka Legislative Assembly election : Kudligi
Party	Candidate	Votes	%	±%
BJP	Anil Lad	58,977	48.88	▲26.14
INC	Siraj Sheikh	41,796	34.64	▼7.02
JD(S)	N. M. Nabisahib	12,223	10.13	▼4.07
Independent	J. M. Veerasangajah	1,754	1.45	New
BSP	Suryanarayana. K. H	1,723	1.43	New
JP	Angadi Gavisiddappa	1,122	0.93	New
Independent	Sheik Mohamed Sirajuddin	986	0.82	New
Margin of victory		17,181	14.24	▼4.69
Turnout		120,857	73.85	▲1.89
Total valid votes		120,659		
Registered electors		163,647		▲13.67
BJP gain from INC		Swing	▲7.22	

=== Assembly Election 1999 ===
1999 Karnataka Legislative Assembly election : Kudligi
Party	Candidate	Votes	%	±%
INC	Siraj Sheikh	39,825	41.66	▲16.46
BJP	N. T. Bommanna	21,732	22.74	▲17.23
JD(S)	N. M. Nabisahib	13,572	14.20	New
Independent	J. M. Ratna Naik	11,293	11.81	New
Independent	Angadi Gavisiddappa	7,049	7.37	New
Independent	M. Yerriswamy	1,134	1.19	New
Independent	K. Ramappa	983	1.03	New
Margin of victory		18,093	18.93	▲5.92
Turnout		103,593	71.96	▲0.16
Total valid votes		95,588		
Rejected ballots		7,969	7.69	▲4.25
Registered electors		143,962		▲10.81
INC gain from JD		Swing	▲3.45	

=== Assembly Election 1994 ===
1994 Karnataka Legislative Assembly election : Kudligi
Party	Candidate	Votes	%	±%
JD	N. M. Nabisahib	34,413	38.21	▲1.07
INC	N. T. Bommanna	22,696	25.20	▼22.56
Independent	M. G. Kulkarni	17,213	19.11	New
CPI(M)	J. M. Veerasangajah	6,362	7.06	New
BJP	Padma Vittal	4,960	5.51	New
INC	Sathyappa	2,154	2.39	New
Independent	Kotresh	1,427	1.58	New
Margin of victory		11,717	13.01	▲2.39
Turnout		93,276	71.80	▲0.61
Total valid votes		90,065		
Rejected ballots		3,211	3.44	▼4.01
Registered electors		129,914		▲11.30
JD gain from INC		Swing	▼9.55	

=== Assembly Election 1989 ===
1989 Karnataka Legislative Assembly election : Kudligi
Party	Candidate	Votes	%	±%
INC	N. T. Bommanna	36,728	47.76	▼4.46
JD	N. M. Nabisahib	28,561	37.14	New
JP	Govindappa Kanakeri	6,137	7.98	New
CPI	K. B. Shiva Shankara	4,045	5.26	New
Margin of victory		8,167	10.62	▲3.07
Turnout		83,091	71.19	▲3.56
Total valid votes		76,898		
Rejected ballots		6,193	7.45	▲5.46
Registered electors		116,725		▲29.27
INC hold		Swing	▼4.46	

=== Assembly Election 1985 ===
1985 Karnataka Legislative Assembly election : Kudligi
Party	Candidate	Votes	%	±%
INC	N. T. Bommanna	31,252	52.22	▲4.45
JP	N. M. Nabisahib	26,734	44.67	▼3.89
BJP	N. Hanumantha Setty	1,764	2.95	New
Margin of victory		4,518	7.55	▲6.76
Turnout		61,065	67.63	▲2.79
Total valid votes		59,851		
Rejected ballots		1,214	1.99	▼1.41
Registered electors		90,295		▲11.26
INC gain from JP		Swing	▲3.66	

=== Assembly Election 1983 ===
1983 Karnataka Legislative Assembly election : Kudligi
Party	Candidate	Votes	%	±%
JP	K. Channabasavana Gowd	24,683	48.56	▲19.98
INC	N. T. Bommanna	24,281	47.77	▲42.46
Independent	Channappa	900	1.77	New
Independent	Hesanulla Seb	762	1.50	New
Margin of victory		402	0.79	▼34.46
Turnout		52,620	64.84	▼3.28
Total valid votes		50,830		
Rejected ballots		1,790	3.40	▼0.68
Registered electors		81,159		▲8.73
JP gain from INC(I)		Swing	▼15.28	

=== Assembly Election 1978 ===
1978 Karnataka Legislative Assembly election : Kudligi
Party	Candidate	Votes	%	±%
INC(I)	T. Somappa	31,136	63.84	New
JP	B. Sathyanarayana Sing	13,942	28.58	New
INC	A. Buddappa	2,590	5.31	▼25.31
Independent	Akki Rudrappa	676	1.39	New
Independent	P. Kotrappa	431	0.88	New
Margin of victory		17,194	35.25	▼3.50
Turnout		50,850	68.12	▲0.41
Total valid votes		48,775		
Rejected ballots		2,075	4.08	▲4.08
Registered electors		74,645		▲0.07
INC(I) gain from INC(O)		Swing	▼5.54	

=== Assembly Election 1972 ===
1972 Mysore State Legislative Assembly election : Kudligi
Party	Candidate	Votes	%	±%
INC(O)	B. S. Veerabhadrappa	34,110	69.38	New
INC	P. J. Krishnavarma Raju	15,056	30.62	▼27.21
Margin of victory		19,054	38.75	▲20.69
Turnout		50,510	67.71	▼3.06
Total valid votes		49,166		
Registered electors		74,595		▲15.99
INC(O) gain from INC		Swing	▲11.55	

=== Assembly Election 1967 ===
1967 Mysore State Legislative Assembly election : Kudligi
Party	Candidate	Votes	%	±%
INC	M. M. J. Sadyojatha	24,488	57.83	▲27.75
Independent	T. S. Goud	16,840	39.77	New
PSP	S. Virupakshappa	1,014	2.39	▼10.23
Margin of victory		7,648	18.06	▼6.07
Turnout		45,513	70.77	▲11.93
Total valid votes		42,342		
Registered electors		64,309		▲16.33
INC gain from Independent		Swing	▲3.61	

=== Assembly Election 1962 ===
1962 Mysore State Legislative Assembly election : Kudligi
Party	Candidate	Votes	%	±%
Independent	V. Nagappa	15,687	54.22	New
INC	Basavva	8,704	30.08	▲1.46
PSP	M. Danapa	3,651	12.62	New
Independent	Sunkappa Dodda	511	1.77	New
Independent	Lokya Naik	381	1.32	New
Margin of victory		6,983	24.13	▲3.84
Turnout		32,527	58.84	▲3.34
Total valid votes		28,934		
Registered electors		55,280		▼25.38
Independent hold		Swing	▲5.32	

=== Assembly Election 1952 ===
1952 Madras State Legislative Assembly election : Kudligi
Party	Candidate	Votes	%	±%
Independent	Kotrabasavana Goud	20,104	48.90	New
INC	T. M. Panchakshariah	11,764	28.62	New
Independent	Chennabasappa	9,243	22.48	New
Margin of victory		8,340	20.29	
Turnout		41,111	55.50	
Total valid votes		41,111		
Registered electors		74,079		
Independent win (new seat)				

== See also ==
- List of constituencies of the Karnataka Legislative Assembly
- Vijayanagara district
