= Bellary City Assembly constituency =

Legislative Assembly constituency in Karnataka, India

Coordinates: 15.14°N 76.91°E

Ballari City
- Constituency No. 94 for the Karnataka Legislative Assembly

Constituency details
- Country: India
- Region: South India
- State: Karnataka
- District: Ballari
- Lok Sabha constituency: Ballari
- Established: 2008
- Total electors: 259,221
- Reservation: None

Member of Legislative Assembly
- 16th Karnataka Legislative Assembly
- Incumbent Nara Bharath Reddy
- Party: Indian National Congress
- Elected year: 2023
- Preceded by: Gali Somasekhara Reddy

Ballari City Assembly constituency is one of the seats in Karnataka State Assembly in India. It is part of Ballari Lok Sabha constituency. The constituency includes 28 wards of Ballari Mahanagara Palika. The constituency came into existence after the 2008 delimitation. It was a part of Bellary Rural Assembly constituency.

Nara Bharath Reddy is the current MLA from Ballari City.

== Geographical scope ==
The constituency comprises ward nos. 1-24 and 36-39 wards of Ballari Municipal Corporation. Urban voters at Ballari City assembly is approximately 242,170 which is around 99.78% as per 2011 Census.

== Members of Legislative Assembly ==
Year	Member	Party
Before 2008 – See: Bellary
2008	Gali Someshkar Reddy	Bharatiya Janata Party
2013	Anil Lad	Indian National Congress
2018	Gali Somasekhara Reddy	Bharatiya Janata Party
2023	Nara Bharath Reddy	Indian National Congress

== Election results ==
=== Assembly Election 2023 ===
2023 Karnataka Legislative Assembly election : Bellary City
Party	Candidate	Votes	%	±%
INC	Nara Bharath Reddy	86,440	48.47%	▲8.52
KRPP	Gali Lakshmi Aruna	48,577	27.24%	New
BJP	G. Somasekhara Reddy	37,155	20.83%	▼29.80
NOTA	None of the above	983	0.55%	▼0.12
Margin of victory		37,863	21.23%	▲10.55
Turnout		178,899	69.01%	▲4.06
Total valid votes		178,350		
Registered electors		259,221		▲11.12
INC gain from BJP		Swing	▼2.16	

=== Assembly Election 2018 ===
2018 Karnataka Legislative Assembly election : Bellary City
Party	Candidate	Votes	%	±%
BJP	Gali Somashekar Reddy	76,589	50.63%	▲46.23
INC	Anil Lad	60,434	39.95%	▼0.63
JD(S)	Mohamad Iqbal Hothur	6,255	4.14%	▼8.54
KPJP	Mekala Eswara Reddy	913	0.60%	New
NOTA	None of the above	1,016	0.67%	New
Margin of victory		16,155	10.68%	▼3.50
Turnout		151,510	64.95%	▲3.41
Total valid votes		151,267		
Registered electors		233,284		▲20.12
BJP gain from INC		Swing	▲10.05	

=== Assembly Election 2013 ===
2013 Karnataka Legislative Assembly election : Bellary City
Party	Candidate	Votes	%	±%
INC	Anil Lad	52,098	40.58%	▼5.96
BSRCP	S. Murali Krishna	33,898	26.40%	New
JD(S)	Munna	16,285	12.68%	New
BJP	Guttiganuru Virupaksha Gouda	5,646	4.40%	▼43.02
CPI	K. Nagabhushana Rao	2,508	1.95%	New
Independent	J. B. Jayamma	877	0.68%	New
Independent	Chandrashekar Naidu	794	0.62%	New
Margin of victory		18,200	14.18%	▲13.30
Turnout		119,521	61.54%	▲9.49
Total valid votes		128,384		
Registered electors		194,202		▼12.61
INC gain from BJP		Swing	▼6.84	

=== Assembly Election 2008 ===
2008 Karnataka Legislative Assembly election : Bellary City
Party	Candidate	Votes	%	±%
BJP	Gali Somashekar Reddy	54,831	47.42%	New
INC	Anil Lad	53,809	46.54%	New
Independent	Nazeer Hussain	979	0.85%	New
Independent	G. Neelakanthappa	896	0.77%	New
Margin of victory		1,022	0.88%	
Turnout		115,664	52.05%	
Total valid votes		115,631		
Registered electors		222,217		
BJP win (new seat)				

== See also ==
- List of constituencies of Karnataka Legislative Assembly
