= Narayan Rao Tarale =

Indian politician (1936–2019)

Karnataka Legislative Assembly
- In office 1994–1999
- Preceded by: Bapusaheb Raosaheb Mahagaonkar
- Succeeded by: Kudachi Ramesh Laxman
- Constituency: Belgaum

Personal details
- Born: c. 1936
- Died: 24 November 2019 (aged 83)
- Party: Maharashtra Ekikaran Samiti (MES)

Narayan Rao Tarale (1936–2019) was an Indian politician from Karnataka. He was a member of the Karnataka Legislative Assembly.

== Biography ==
Tarale was elected as a member of the Karnataka Legislative Assembly from Belgaum in 1994. He was the vice president of Maratha Mandal which runs educational institution.

Tarale died on 24 November 2019 at the age of 83.

== Electoral performance ==
Election	Constituency	Party	Result	Votes %	Opposition Candidate	Opposition Party	Opposition vote %	Ref
1994	Belagavi City	Independent	Won	44.79%	Potdar Anil Mohanrao	Independent	31.13%	
