= J. Shantha =

Indian politician (born 1973)

Member of Parliament, Lok Sabha
- In office 2009 – 2014
- Preceded by: Gali Karunakara Reddy
- Succeeded by: B. Sriramulu
- Constituency: Bellary

Personal details
- Born: 1 June 1973 (age 52). Bellary
- Citizenship: India
- Party: YSR Congress Party (2024- present)
- Other political affiliations: Bharatiya Janata Party.
- Relations: B. Sriramulu (Brother)
- Children: 1 daughter.
- Parent(s): Mr. B. Thimmappa (Father), Mrs. B. Honnuramma (Mother)
- Profession: Social worker, politician.
- Committees: Member, Committee on Water Resources

Joladarasi Santha is an Indian politician and a Member of Parliament in the 15th Lok Sabha of India. She represents the Bellary constituency of Karnataka and is a member of the Bharatiya Janata Party political party. She is the sister of B Sriramulu.

J. Shantha joined YSRCP on 2 January 2024 in the presence of party president and Chief Minister Y. S. Jagan Mohan Reddy and declared as party candidate from Hindupur Loksabha for the upcoming 2024 Lok Sabha Elections.

== Early life and education ==
Shantha was born in Bellary, Karnataka. Her highest attained education is intermediate.

== Political career ==
Shantha, is the elected Member of Parliament from a constituency which is reserved for scheduled tribe's candidates. She also contested 2018 by election from Ballari but lost by a huge margin of 240,000 votes.

== Posts held ==
#	From	To	Position
01	2009	2014	Member, 15th Lok Sabha
02	2009	2014	Member, Committee on Water Resources

== See also ==
- 15th Lok Sabha
- Politics of India
- Parliament of India
- Government of India
- Bellary
- Bharatiya Janata Party
