= Nara Bharath Reddy =

Indian politician (born 1990)

Member of Karnataka Legislative Assembly
- Incumbent
- Assumed office 13 May 2023
- Preceded by: Gali Somashekar Reddy
- Constituency: Bellary City

Personal details
- Born: 25 October 1990 (age 35) Bellary, Karnataka
- Party: Indian National Congress, Janata Dal (Secular) until 2014
- Children: 1
- Parent: N Surayanarayana Reddy
- Education: B.BM
- Profession: Businessperson

Nara Bharath Reddy (born 25 October 1990) is an Indian politician from Karnataka. He is an MLA from Bellary Assembly constituency in Bellary district. He won the 2023 Karnataka Legislative Assembly election representing the Indian National Congress.

== Early life and education ==
Reddy is from Bellary. He was born to Nara Suryanarayana Reddy who is the former Janata Dal (Secular) MLA from Kurugodu Assembly constituency in Bellary district. He completed his B.B.M. in 2010 at Gulbarga University, and then pursued his Masters in Business Administration in London, UK.

== Career ==
Bharath Reddy first contested for Zilla Panchayat elections in 2014 and won against the BJP with highest margin in Karnataka from Korlagundi Zilla Panchayat. Reddy won from Bellary City Assembly constituency representing the Indian National Congress in the 2023 Karnataka Legislative Assembly election. He polled 86,440 votes and defeated his nearest rival, Gali Lakshmi Aruna of the KRPP, by a huge margin of 37,863 votes. It is the highest margin win ever achieved in history of bellary elections.He is also Director (Apex Bank Representative) of Bellary DCC bank.
