= Belagavi City Assembly constituency =

Former constituency in Karnataka, India

Coordinates: 15.87°N 74.51°E

Belgaum
- Former constituency for the Karnataka Legislative Assembly

Constituency details
- Country: India
- Region: South India
- State: Karnataka
- District: Belagavi
- Lok Sabha constituency: Belgaum
- Established: 1951
- Abolished: 2008
- Total electors: 185,703
- Reservation: None

Belgaum City Assembly constituency was part of the Karnataka state assembly in India, and part of Belgaum Lok Sabha constituency. The seat ceased to exist after the assembly seats' boundary was redrawn in 2008. Now the city's constituencies are Belgaum Dakshin and Belgaum Uttar.

== Members of the Legislative Assembly ==
Election	Member	Party
1952	Dalvi Bhujang Keshav	Independent politician
1957	Sunthankar Balakrishna Rangrao	Independent politician
1962	Sunthankar Balakrishna Rangrao	Maharashtra Ekikaran Samiti
1967	Sayanak Balwant Bhimrao	Independent politician
1972	S. W. B. Annappa	Independent politician
1978	Sayanak Balwant Bhimrao	Independent politician
1983	Mane Rajabhau Shankar Rao	Independent politician
1985	Mane Rajabhau Shankar Rao	Independent politician
1989	Bapusaheb Raosaheb Mahagaonkar	Independent politician
1989 By-election (Note: Died on 26 December 1991)	Arjunrao Laxmanrao Hishobkar	Independent politician
1994	Narayan Rao Tarale	Independent politician
1999	Kudachi Ramesh Laxman	Indian National Congress
2004	Kudachi Ramesh Laxman	Indian National Congress

== Election results ==
=== Assembly Election 2004 ===
2004 Karnataka Legislative Assembly election : Belagavi City
Party	Candidate	Votes	%	±%
INC	Kudachi Ramesh Laxman	32,198	32.58%	▼8.35
BJP	Vilas Ramachandra Pawar	31,181	31.55%	▲6.11
Independent	Dalvi Deepak Arjun Rao	29,051	29.40%	New
JD(S)	Madiwale. F. M	2,213	2.24%	New
SS	Prakash Ramachandra Shirolkar	1,197	1.21%	New
Kannada Nadu Party	Girish Parasharam Balekundri	1,098	1.11%	New
Independent	Satish Neminath Gouragonda	925	0.94%	New
AIML	Sayyed Bande Nawaz Mohammed Hanif	693	0.70%	New
Margin of victory		1,017	1.03%	▼7.30
Turnout		98,907	53.26%	▼6.49
Total valid votes		98,820		
Registered electors		185,703		▲16.51
INC hold		Swing	▼8.35	

=== Assembly Election 1999 ===
1999 Karnataka Legislative Assembly election : Belagavi City
Party	Candidate	Votes	%	±%
INC	Kudachi Ramesh Laxman	37,664	40.93%	▲29.11
Independent	Ashtekar Malojirao Shantaram	30,004	32.61%	New
BJP	Rajpurohit Babulal Achalsingh	23,405	25.44%	▲14.68
SP	Farook Hannan	617	0.67%	New
Margin of victory		7,660	8.33%	▼5.32
Turnout		95,227	59.75%	▲3.28
Total valid votes		92,010		
Rejected ballots		3,196	3.36%	▲1.96
Registered electors		159,386		▲11.93
INC gain from Independent		Swing	▼3.86	

=== Assembly Election 1994 ===
1994 Karnataka Legislative Assembly election : Belagavi City
Party	Candidate	Votes	%	±%
Independent	Narayan Rao Tarale	35,515	44.79%	New
Independent	Potdar Anil Mohanrao	24,689	31.13%	New
INC	Chandshawale Sayed Anwarsha Syeed Peer	9,375	11.82%	New
BJP	Patil Shankarrao Irappa	8,535	10.76%	New
Independent	Doddawani Narayan Krishnayya	478	0.60%	New
Margin of victory		10,826	13.65%	
Turnout		80,420	56.47%	
Total valid votes		79,297		
Rejected ballots		1,123	1.40%	
Registered electors		142,404		
Independent hold		Swing		

=== Assembly By-election 1989 ===
1989 Karnataka Legislative Assembly by-election : Belagavi City
Party	Candidate	Votes	%	±%
Independent	Arjunrao Laxmanrao Hishobkar			
Independent hold		Swing	▼38.96	

=== Assembly Election 1989 ===
1989 Karnataka Legislative Assembly election : Belagavi City
Party	Candidate	Votes	%	±%
Independent	Bapusaheb Raosaheb Mahagaonkar	35,196	38.96%	New
JP	Potdar Anil Mohanrao	29,809	32.99%	New
Independent	Dalvi Deepak Arjun Rao	10,037	11.11%	New
INC	Shobha Anil Herwadkar	8,382	9.28%	▼23.41
JD	Potadar Asha Vasantrao	3,973	4.40%	New
Independent	Mushtaq Hussain Faroqui	831	0.92%	New
Independent	Krishna Shankarrao Mandekar	703	0.78%	New
Margin of victory		5,387	5.96%	▼10.67
Turnout		93,644	67.27%	▲7.96
Total valid votes		90,350		
Rejected ballots		3,294	3.52%	▲2.49
Registered electors		139,206		▲24.37
Independent hold		Swing	▼10.35	

=== Assembly Election 1985 ===
1985 Karnataka Legislative Assembly election : Belagavi City
Party	Candidate	Votes	%	±%
Independent	Mane Rajabhau Shankar Rao	32,401	49.31%	New
INC	Kakatkar Shivajirao Yallappa	21,477	32.69%	▼5.43
JP	Chindak Rajendra Goverdhan	5,770	8.78%	▲3.49
Margin of victory		10,924	16.63%	▲0.70
Turnout		66,390	59.31%	▼20.99
Total valid votes		65,704		
Rejected ballots		686	1.03%	▼0.05
Registered electors		111,931		▲12.39
Independent hold		Swing	▼4.75	

=== Assembly Election 1983 ===
1983 Karnataka Legislative Assembly election : Belagavi City
Party	Candidate	Votes	%	±%
Independent	Mane Rajabhau Shankar Rao	42,763	54.06%	New
INC	Doddannavar Surendra Alias Komalanna Ramachandra	30,159	38.12%	New
JP	Sirur Chandrashekhar Neelakantappa	4,183	5.29%	New
Independent	Moulvi Farook Ahmed. A. Hannan	1,412	1.78%	New
Margin of victory		12,604	15.93%	▼1.30
Turnout		79,974	80.30%	▼1.01
Total valid votes		79,109		
Rejected ballots		865	1.08%	▼0.20
Registered electors		99,592		▲14.60
Independent hold		Swing	▼2.91	

=== Assembly Election 1978 ===
1978 Karnataka Legislative Assembly election : Belagavi City
Party	Candidate	Votes	%	±%
Independent	Sayanak Balwant Bhimrao	39,736	56.97%	New
Independent	Naghnoor. M. N	27,720	39.74%	New
Independent	Mokashi Abdulsattar Mohamad Ghouse	942	1.35%	New
Independent	K. Vidyasagar	865	1.24%	New
Margin of victory		12,016	17.23%	▼2.83
Turnout		70,658	81.31%	▲4.36
Total valid votes		69,753		
Rejected ballots		905	1.28%	▲1.28
Registered electors		86,901		▲19.87
Independent hold		Swing	▲11.86	

=== Assembly Election 1972 ===
1972 Mysore State Legislative Assembly election : Belagavi City
Party	Candidate	Votes	%	±%
Independent	S. W. B. Annappa	24,814	45.11%	New
INC(O)	P. R. Bhimarao	13,783	25.06%	New
CPI	M. K. Parasharam	12,646	22.99%	New
Independent	K. G. Shankarrao	1,995	3.63%	New
Independent	G. M. Abdul Majid	1,409	2.56%	New
SWA	A. Tatyasahab Mirji	356	0.65%	New
Margin of victory		11,031	20.06%	▲13.26
Turnout		55,785	76.95%	▼7.29
Total valid votes		55,003		
Registered electors		72,495		▲11.86
Independent hold		Swing	▼7.53	

=== Assembly Election 1967 ===
1967 Mysore State Legislative Assembly election : Belagavi City
Party	Candidate	Votes	%	±%
Independent	Sayanak Balwant Bhimrao	27,818	52.64%	New
INC	P. B. Bharmagauda	24,224	45.84%	▲12.84
Independent	M. K. Parasharam	582	1.10%	New
Margin of victory		3,594	6.80%	▼27.20
Turnout		54,595	84.24%	▲9.85
Total valid votes		52,843		
Registered electors		64,808		▲13.00
Independent gain from MES		Swing	▼14.36	

=== Assembly Election 1962 ===
1962 Mysore State Legislative Assembly election : Belagavi City
Party	Candidate	Votes	%	±%
MES	Sunthankar Balakrishna Rangrao	27,643	67.00%	New
INC	Sidaram Basappa Kanabargi	13,614	33.00%	▼8.78
Margin of victory		14,029	34.00%	▲17.56
Turnout		42,664	74.39%	▲3.21
Total valid votes		41,257		
Registered electors		57,351		▲7.16
MES gain from Independent		Swing	▲8.78	

=== Assembly Election 1957 ===
1957 Mysore State Legislative Assembly election : Belgaum City
Party	Candidate	Votes	%	±%
Independent	Sunthankar Balakrishna Rangrao	22,179	58.22%	New
INC	Qazi Mohamed Husain Mohamed Saheb	15,915	41.78%	▲5.57
Margin of victory		6,264	16.44%	▲7.49
Turnout		38,094	71.18%	▲8.72
Total valid votes		38,094		
Registered electors		53,520		▲2.47
Independent hold		Swing	▲13.06	

=== Assembly Election 1952 ===
1952 Bombay State Legislative Assembly election : Belgaum Urban
Party	Candidate	Votes	%	±%
Independent	Dalvi Bhujang Keshav	14,732	45.16%	New
INC	Potdar Bhimaji Balaji	11,812	36.21%	New
Socialist Party (India)	Pai Nath Bapu	6,078	18.63%	New
Margin of victory		2,920	8.95%	
Turnout		32,622	62.46%	
Total valid votes		32,622		
Registered electors		52,230		
Independent win (new seat)				

== See also ==
- Belagavi District
- List of constituencies of Karnataka Legislative Assembly
