= N. Y. Gopalakrishna =

Indian politician

Member of the Karnataka Legislative Assembly
- Incumbent
- Assumed office 13 May 2023
- Preceded by: B. Sriramulu
- Constituency: Molakalmuru

Member of the Karnataka Legislative Assembly
- In office 2018–2023
- Preceded by: B. Nagendra
- Succeeded by: N. T. Srinivas
- Constituency: Kudligi

Member of the Karnataka Legislative Assembly
- In office 2014–2018
- Preceded by: B. Sriramulu
- Succeeded by: B. Nagendra
- Constituency: Bellary Rural

Member of the Karnataka Legislative Assembly
- In office 1997–2013
- Preceded by: Purna Muthappa
- Succeeded by: S. Thippeswamy
- Constituency: Molakalmuru

Personal details
- Born: 3 July 1952 (age 74) Rampura
- Party: Indian National Congress (before 2018; 2023 onwards)
- Other political affiliations: Bharatiya Janata Party (2018 - 2023)
- Spouse: N. R. Gayatridevi
- Relatives: N. Y. Hanumanthappa (brother)
- Education: Master of Business Administration, Bachelor of Arts
- Occupation: Politician

N. Yallappa Gopalakrishna is an Indian social worker and politician from the state of Karnataka. He is a six-time member of the Karnataka Legislative Assembly from Molakalmuru. He represented Kudligi and Bellary Rural previously.

N. Y. Gopalakrishna has been appointed as Chairman - Committee for implementation of D.M. Nanjundappa Committee recommendations in 2016.

== Constituency ==
He is the representative of the Molakalmuru constituency, being elected in 2023. He previously served as MLA from Kudligi from 2018 till 2023. He represented Bellary Rural from 2014 till 2018. He won the polls and represented the Molakalmuru constituency from 1997 to 2013. In 2023 Karnataka Assembly Elections N. Y. Gopalakrishna contested against others from the Molakalmuru constituency, defeating the AAP Candidate S. T. Hareesh Nayaka.

== Political party ==
He belonged to Indian National Congress until 2018. He joined BJP in the year 2018. Later, he rejoined Indian National Congress in year 2023.

Karnataka Legislative Assembly
Preceded by Purna Muthappa	Member of the Legislative Assembly for Molakalmuru; 1997–2013	Succeeded by S. Thippeswamy
Preceded by B. Sriramulu	Member of the Legislative Assembly for Bellary Rural; 2014–2018	Succeeded by B. Nagendra
Preceded by B. Nagendra	Member of the Legislative Assembly for Kudligi; 2018–2023	Succeeded by N. T. Srinivas
Preceded by B. Sriramulu	Member of the Legislative Assembly for Molakalmuru; 13 May 2023 – Present	Incumbent
