= B. Sriramulu =

Indian politician (born 1971)

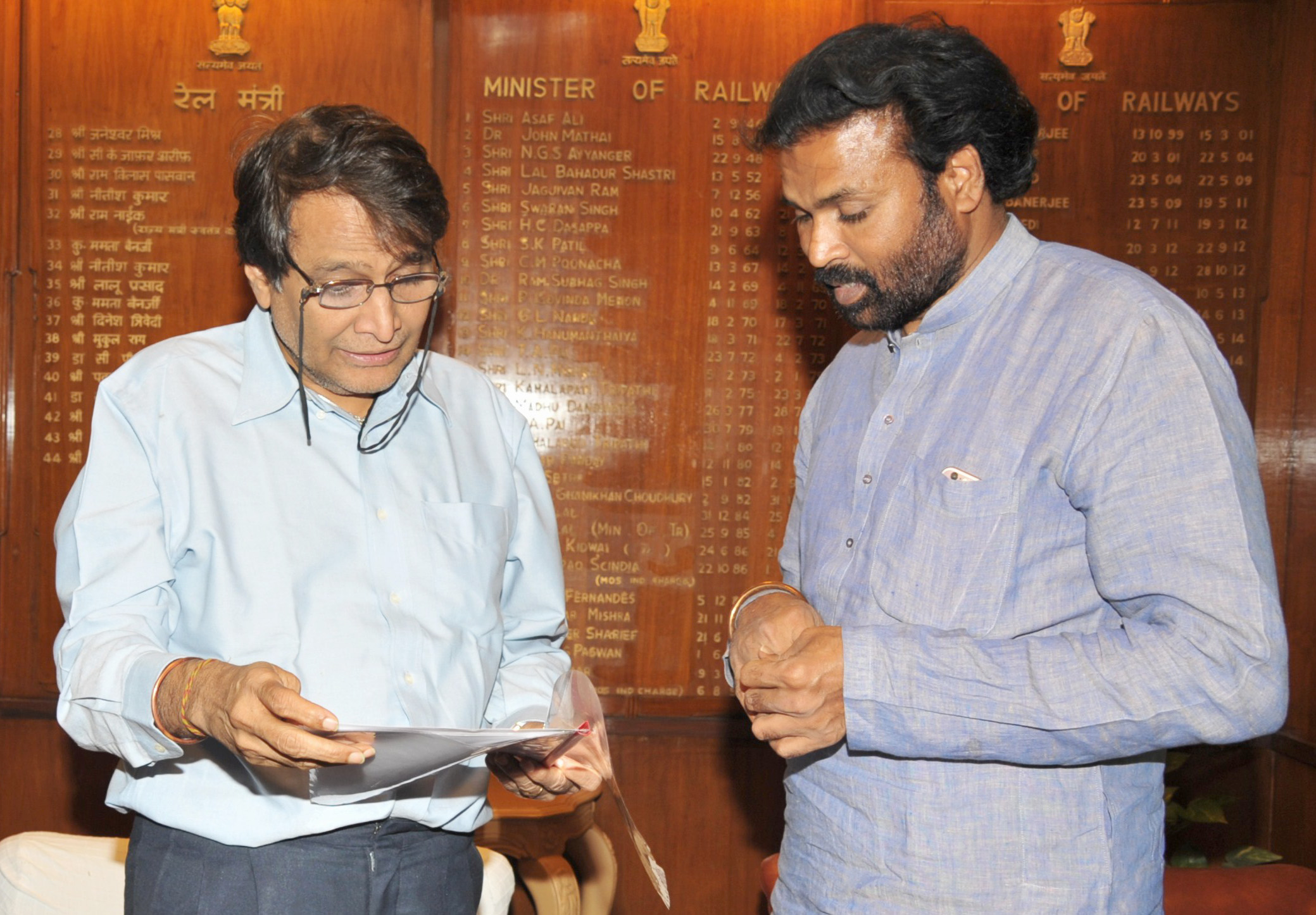
- Sriramulu (right)

Minister of Transport Government of Karnataka
- In office 4 August 2021 – 13 May 2023
- Chief Minister: Basavaraj Bommai
- Preceded by: Laxman Savadi
- Succeeded by: Ramalinga Reddy

Minister of Tribal Welfare Government of Karnataka
- In office 4 August 2021 – 13 May 2023
- Chief Minister: Basavaraj Bommai
- Preceded by: ministry created
- Succeeded by: B Nagendra

Minister of Social Welfare Government of Karnataka
- In office 12 October 2020 – 28 July 2021
- Chief Minister: B. S. Yediyurappa
- Preceded by: Govind Karjol
- Succeeded by: Kota Srinivas Poojary

Minister of Backward Classes Welfare Government of Karnataka
- In office 27 September 2019 – 12 October 2020
- Chief Minister: B. S. Yediyurappa
- Preceded by: C. Puttarangashetty
- Succeeded by: Kota Srinivas Poojary

Minister of Health & Family Welfare Government of Karnataka
- In office 20 August 2019 – 12 October 2020
- Chief Minister: B. S. Yediyurappa
- Preceded by: Shivanand Patil
- Succeeded by: K. Sudhakar
- In office 30 May 2008 – 4 August 2011
- Chief Minister: B. S. Yediyurappa
- Preceded by: R. Ashoka
- Succeeded by: Arvind Limbavali

Minister of Tourism Government of Karnataka
- In office 18 February 2006 – 8 October 2007
- Chief Minister: H. D. Kumaraswamy
- Preceded by: D. T. Jayakumar
- Succeeded by: G. Janardhana Reddy

Minister of Textiles Government of Karnataka
- In office 18 February 2006 – 25 January 2007
- Chief Minister: H. D. Kumaraswamy
- Preceded by: Amaregouda P. Bayyapur
- Succeeded by: Appu Pattanshetty

Member of the Karnataka Legislative Assembly
- In office 13 May 2018 – 13 May 2023
- Preceded by: Tippaswamy.S
- Constituency: Molakalmuru
- In office 2004–2014
- Preceded by: Diwakar Babu
- Succeeded by: Gopalkrishna K
- Constituency: Bellary Rural

Member of Parliament Lok Sabha
- In office 2014–2018
- Preceded by: J. Shantha, BJP
- Succeeded by: V. S. Ugrappa, INC
- Constituency: Bellary(LS)

Personal details
- Born: 8 August 1971 (age 55) Ballari, Mysore State, India
- Party: BJP
- Other political affiliations: Badavara Shramikara Raitara Congress (2011–2014)
- Spouse: Lakshmi
- Children: 4
- Relatives: J. Shantha (Sister)

Ballari Sreeramulu (born 8 August 1971) is an Indian politician who served as Minister of Transport Department and Tribal Welfare of Karnataka from 4 August 2021, till 13 May 2023. He was the Minister of Social Welfare Department of Karnataka from 12 October 2020, to 26 July 2021. He was a member of the Karnataka Legislative Assembly from Bellary Rural Molakalmuru Constituency in Chitradurga district. He is the Social Welfare minister in the Government of Karnataka. He served as a Health and Family welfare minister previously from (2008-2011 and August 2019 to October 2020) also as a Minister of Backward class welfare from September 2019 to October 2020. He serves in the Bharatiya Janata Party government led by B. S. Yediyurappa. He served as a member of Lok Sabha from 2014-2018 from Ballari. In March 2024, he was announced as the BJP candidate from the same constituency in the 2024 General Elections.

== Early life ==
B. Sreeramulu was born in Ballari, Karnataka on 8 August 1971 to B. Thimmappa, a railway employee and B. Honnuramma, a housewife. He is the seventh child among four brothers and four sisters.

== Career ==
In the 1999 Lok Sabha elections Sreeramulu worked as a local aide for Sushma Swaraj, who contested from Bellary Lok Sabha constituency, when she contested against the Congress giant Sonia Gandhi, to give a fierce fight and lose at a close margin. With the support of Sreeramulu and Janardhan Reddy, she later won the election from the same constituency in the next general elections.

In the 2008 Karnataka Legislative Assembly election he was elected from the Bellary constituency, where BJP had their first chance to form the government independently under the leadership of B. S. Yediyurappa. He later served as the Minister for health and family welfare for around 3 years in the Karnataka government. In September 2011, he resigned his post as the cabinet minister and also from the post of the MLA and he later quit the BJP, accusing and owing to alleged humiliation shouted out at his friend and mentor and jailed the former tourism minister Gali Janardhan Reddy for acquiring illegal wealth from various sources without documentation.

Subsequently, with much competition and considering it to be a prestige, he contested as an Independent candidate again from the Bellary Rural constituency and also won. He then floated a regional party, Badavara Shramikara Raithara Congress or BSR Congress. He also announced that his party is going to contest from all the constituencies in the 2013 Karnataka Legislative Assembly election. Though his party did not manage to win many of the seats, it gave a major setback to BJP, by dividing the vote share mainly in the Hyderabad-Karnataka region, and shut the seat share to only 40 seats for the BJP.

After his party faced the election defeat in 2013, he decided to merge his party with the BJP, saying that he and his party are keen to work, to bring Narendra Modi to power in the 2014 Indian general elections. In March 2014 he again joined BJP and contested Lok Sabha election from Bellary where he slidingly won the seat.

He is BJP Karnataka, state vice-president. B. Sreeramulu was health, tourism Ballari district minister in the Yeddyurappa government.

In 2018, Karnataka assembly elections, Sreeramulu contested from Molkalmuru and Badami. He won Molkalmuru, by a margin of 40,000 odd votes, but lost the Badami seat by 1500 votes to the former chief minister Siddaramaiah.

On 27 July 2018, Sreeramulu called for a separate state for North Karnataka due to alleged "injustice" in that part of the state. After the coalition government led by H. D. Kumaraswamy lost its majority, paving the way to BJP to form the government he was inducted as a minister into the cabinet. He serves as Minister of Health and Family Welfare in the government.

In the 2023 General election to Karnataka Legislative assembly, Sreeramulu contested in Bellary seat and lost to INC candidate B Nagendra by a margin of 29300 votes.

== Electoral History ==
=== Legislative Assembly ===
Year	Constituency	Party	Votes	%	Opponent	Party	Votes	%	Result	Margin	%
2023	Bellary	BJP	74,536	40.80	B. Nagendra	INC	1,03,836	56.84	Lost	-29,300	-16.04
2018	Molakalmuru	BJP	84,018	43.63	B. Yogesh Babu	INC	41,973	21.80	Won	+42,045	+21.83
2013	Bellary	BSR	74,854	57.44	Asundi Vannurappa	INC	41,560	31.89	Won	+33,294	+25.55
2008	Bellary	BJP	61,991	56.23	B. Ramprasad	INC	36,275	32.79	Won	+25,716	+23.44
2004	Bellary	BJP	53,354	47.29	M. Diwakar Babu	INC	46,643	41.34	Won	+6,711	+5.95

=== Lok Sabha ===
Year	Constituency	Party	Votes	%	Opponent	Party	Votes	%	Result	Margin	%
2024	Bellary	BJP	6,31,853	45.72	E. Tukaram	INC	7,30,845	52.88	Lost	-98,992	-7.16
2014	Bellary	BJP	5,34,406	51.09	N. Y. Hanumantappa	INC	4,49,262	42.95	Won	+85,144	+8.14
