= Anil Lad =

Indian politician (born 1973)

Member of Karnataka Legislative Assembly
- In office 2004–2007
- Constituency: Kudligi Assembly constituency

Member of Parliament - Rajya Sabha
- In office 25 June 2008 – 20 May 2013 (Resignation)

Member of Karnataka Legislative Assembly
- In office 2013–2018
- Constituency: Bellary City Assembly constituency

Personal details
- Spouse: Shrimati Aarti Anil Lad (6 May 1999)
- Parent(s): Shri Heeroji V. Lad and Shrimati Sakkubai Heeroji
- Education: Sandur Residential School, Sandur, Bellary District.
- Profession: Social worker, industrialist, politician

Anil Lad (born 7 December 1973) is an Indian politician who served as a Member of Parliament in Rajya Sabha the upper house of the Parliament of India, from the state of Karnataka. He also won 2013 Karnataka Legislative Assembly election from Bellary City Assembly constituency.

== Early life and background ==
Anil was born to Shri Heeroji V. Lad and Shrimati Sakkubai Heeroji Lad on 7 December 1973 in Sandur, Bellary District in Karnataka. He completed his education at Sandur Residential School in Sandur, Bellary District, Karnataka.

== Personal life ==
Anil Lad married Shrimati Aarti Anil Lad on 6 May 1999.

== Positions held ==
#	From	To	Position
1.	2004	2007	MLA (1st term) from Kudligi Assembly constituency
2.	2008	2013	MP in Rajya Sabha from Karnataka: Member - Committee on Energy (June 2009 - May 2009); Member - Committee on Science and Technology, Environment and Forests Member, Consultative Committee for the Ministry of Environment and Forests (Aug 2009 - May 2013); Member - Coffee Board (Dec 2012 - Resigned on 20 May 2013)
3.	2013	2018	MLA (2nd term) from Bellary City Assembly constituency
