= N. T. Srinivas =

Indian politician (born 1976)

N. T. Srinivas (born 1976) is an Indian politician from Karnataka. He is an MLA from Kudligi Assembly constituency which is reserved for ST community in Vijayanagara district. He won the 2023 Karnataka Legislative Assembly election representing Indian National Congress.

== Early life and education ==
Srinivas is from Kudligi, in the erstwhile Bellary district which is currently in newly formed Vijayanagara district. His father is N. T. Bommanna. He completed his M.D. in Ophthalmology in 2004 at All India Institute of Medical science, New Delhi.

== Career ==
Srinivas won from Kudligi Assembly constituency representing Indian National Congress in the 2023 Karnataka Legislative Assembly election. He polled 104,753 votes and defeated his nearest rival, Lokesh V. Nayaka of Bharatiya Janata Party, by a huge margin of 54,350 votes.
