= B. Nagendra =

Indian politician

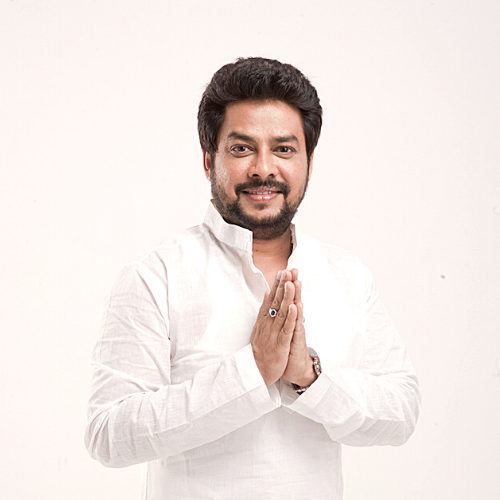

Minister of Planning, Programme and Statistics, Government of Karnataka
- In office 3 August 2026 – 28 August 2026
- Governor: Thawarchand Gehlot
- Chief Minister: D. K. Shivakumar
- Cabinet: D. K. Shivakumar ministry

Minister of Youth Services & Sports, Government of Karnataka
- In office 27 May 2023 – 31 May 2024
- Governor: Thawarchand Gehlot
- Cabinet: Second Siddaramaiah ministry
- Chief Minister: Siddaramaiah
- Ministry and Departments: Youth Services; Sports; ST Welfare
- Preceded by: Narayana Gowda, B Sriramulu
- Succeeded by: Siddaramaiah

Member of the Karnataka Legislative Assembly
- Incumbent
- Assumed office 2018
- Preceded by: NY Gopalkrishna
- Constituency: Bellary Rural
- In office 2008–2018
- Preceded by: Anil Lad
- Succeeded by: NY Gopalkrishna
- Constituency: Kudligi

Personal details
- Born: 15 September 1971 (age 54) Bellary
- Party: Indian national congress (2018 - present)
- Other political affiliations: Bhartiya Janata Party (2008-2018)
- Occupation: Politician
- Profession: Mine Owner

B. Nagendra is an Indian politician & Cabinet Minister in Karnataka. He has been elected four times as a member of the Karnataka Legislative Assembly from the Bellary & Kudligi constituency. He started his career in Bhartiya Janata Party & later shifted to Indian national congress prior to 2018 Karnataka elections in Hospet, Bellary District.

== Education ==
He is a B.com. graduate from Veerashaiva College, Bellary, Gulbarga University in the year 1993.

== Career ==
Nagendra belongs to the Scheduled Tribe (ST) Valmiki Nayak community. He represents Bellary Rural constituency from Ballari district as a member of Karnataka Legislative Assembly as an INC candidate. He was elected as Member of Legislative Assembly from Kudligi from 2008 to 2018 as BJP and Independent candidate respectively. He was a former close aide of Mining Baron Gali Janardhan Reddy. He was involved in illegal transportation of Iron Ore from Bellary mining area. He was also involved in 2024 Valmiki department funds scam & was sent to Bengaluru Jail. He defeated BJP leader and former Transport minister of Karnataka B Sriramulu by 29,500 votes in 2023 legislative assembly election representing Bellary Rural.

== Electoral statistics ==
Year	Constituency	Party	Result	Votes	Opposition Party	Opposition votes
2008	Kudligi	BJP	Won	54,443	INC	45,686
2013	Kudligi	IND	Won	71,477	INC	46,674
2018	Bellary Rural	INC	Won	79,186	BJP	76,507
2023	Bellary Rural	INC	Won	103,836	BJP	74,536

== Controversies ==
=== Valmiki Development Corporation fund misappropriation (2024) ===
In May 2024, B. Nagendra, then Karnataka's Minister for Scheduled Tribes Welfare and chairman of the Karnataka Maharshi Valmiki Scheduled Tribes Development Corporation Limited, was implicated in a financial scandal involving the alleged misappropriation of approximately ₹187 crore from the corporation's funds. The issue came to light following the suicide of accounts superintendent P. Chandrasekharan, who reportedly left a note alleging unauthorized fund transfers to private entities.

Nagendra resigned from his ministerial position in June 2024 amid mounting political pressure. On 12 July 2024, the Enforcement Directorate (ED) arrested him under the provisions of the PMLA in connection with the case. The ED's investigation revealed that ₹187 crore had been transferred from the corporation's account without proper authorization, and a portion of these funds was allegedly used for personal expenses and to support a candidate in the 2024 Lok Sabha elections.

A special court granted Nagendra bail in October 2024, directing him to cooperate with the ongoing investigation. Following his release, Nagendra alleged that the ED had pressured him to implicate Chief Minister Siddaramaiah and Deputy Chief Minister D.K. Shivakumar in the case, claims which the ED has not publicly addressed.
