= Badavara Shramikara Raitara Congress =

Badavara Shramikara Raithara Congress (BSR Congress)
- Abbreviation: BSRCP
- Founder: B. Sriramulu
- Founded: 2011
- Dissolved: 2014
- Merged into: Bharatiya Janata Party

Election symbol

The Badavara Shramikara Raithara (BSR) Congress was a political party based in Karnataka state. It was founded in 2011 by B. Sriramulu, a former minister in the Karnataka State Government. In the 2013 Karnataka Legislative Assembly elections, the party won 4 out of the 150 seats it had contested and secured about 2.7% of the total votes cast.

However, prior to the Lok Sabha elections in 2014, the party's founding leader B. Sriramulu rejoined the BJP.
