= Kannavara Mallappa =

Indian politician (1928–2020)

Member of the Legislative Assembly, Karnataka
- In office 1985–1989
- Preceded by: K. G. Maheshwarappa
- Succeeded by: Nagamma Keshavamurthy
- Constituency: Mayakonda
- In office 1983–1985
- Preceded by: H. Shivappa
- Succeeded by: B. G. Kotrappa
- Constituency: Harihar

Member of the Karnataka Legislative Council
- In office 10 June 1998 – 30 June 2002
- Preceded by: A. Lakshmisagar

Personal details
- Born: 13 April 1928 Davangere
- Died: 12 October 2020 (aged 92)
- Party: Indian National Congress
- Other political affiliations: Janata Dal (Secular) (1999–2007); Janata Dal (1988–1999); Janata Party (Till 1988)
- Profession: Businessman

Kannavara Mallappa, popularly known as K. Mallappa (13 April 1928 – 12 October 2020) was an Indian politician from the state of Karnataka.

== Career ==
Mallappa served as a member of the Karnataka Legislative Council from 10 June 1998 until 30 June 2002. He was elected to fill the vacancy created by the resignation of incumbent member A. Lashmisagar. Prior to that, he unsuccessfully contested the West Teachers’ Constituency Legislative Council Polls in 1980 against Basavaraj Horatti, who was a six-time member.

Mallappa was defeated by Pampathi of the Communist Party of India in Davanagere during the 1978 elections. He was elected to the 7th Karnataka Legislative Assembly from Harihar. Later, he won the 1985 elections from Mayakonda but was defeated by C. Nagamma Keshavamurthy in the 1989 elections.

Mallappa unsuccessfully contested the 13th Lok Sabha elections from Davangere against Gowdara Mallikarjunappa in the 1999 Indian general elections.

=== Positions held ===
- 1956–1960 & 1968–1974: Davanagere City Municipal Councillor.
- 1960: Vice President of Davanagere City Municipality.
- 1968: Member of City Municipality Davanagere.
- 1974: Twice elected as Member of Regulated Market Davanagere.
- 1983–1985: M.L.A. from Harihar Constituency.
- 1985–1989: M.L.A. from Mayakonda Constituency.
- 1984–1985: Served as State Vice President of Karnataka Pradesh Janatha Party.
- 1998–2002: Member of Legislative Council.
