= Mallikarjun =

Mallikarjun is a name. People with the name include:

- Mallikarjun (singer)
- Mallikarjun Kharge
- Prabha Mallikarjun
- Mallikarjun Mansur
- Latha Mallikarjun
- Mallikarjun Khuba
- Mallikarjun Goud
- S. S. Mallikarjun
- Samarth Mallikarjun Shamanur
- Gangambike Mallikarjun
- Mallikarjun Bande
- Dwaram Mallikarjun Reddy
- Jamalpur Mallikarjun
