= S. Ramappa =

Indian politician

Member of Legislative Assembly
- Incumbent
- Assumed office 12 May 2018
- Preceded by: H.S. Shiva Shankar
- Constituency: Harihar

Personal details
- Born: Harihar
- Party: Indian National Congress
- Parent: Sannappa (father)
- Occupation: Politician, Agriculturist

S. Ramappa is a politician from the state of Karnataka. He is a leader of Indian National Congress Party. He is current MLA of Harihar assembly constituency in the Karnataka Legislative Assembly.

== Career ==
He contested from Harihar in 2013 assembly elections but he lost to H S Shiva Shankar of JD(S). And in 2018, he won as MLA by defeating B.P.Harish of BJP.
