= Nagamma Keshavamurthy =

Former Karnataka minister

Minister of Primary and Secondary Education
- In office 1972–1983
- Constituency: Davangere

Minister of Small and Large Industries
- Incumbent
- Assumed office 1989
- Constituency: Mayakonda

Deputy Speaker of the Karnataka Legislative Assembly

Deputy Chairperson of the Karnataka Legislative Assembly

Personal details
- Born: 1933 Bengaluru, India
- Died: 16 March 2024 (age 90) Davangere
- Party: Indian National Congress
- Spouse: C. Keshavamurthy
- Children: 2
- Profession: Politician, social worker

Nagamma Keshavamurthy (1933 – 16 March 2024) was an Indian politician, social worker, and senior Congress leader. She served as a minister in the cabinets of Gundu Rao, Bangarappa, and Veerappa Moily. She was elected as an MLA three times, in 1972, 1978, and 1989, representing the Davangere and Mayakonda constituencies in the assembly.

== Early life ==
Nagamma Keshavamurthy was born in Bengaluru (now Bangalore) to M. N. Raman and Sakamma. She married C. Keshavamurthy, the son of entrepreneur Channagiri Rangappa, in 1951. With encouragement from her mother-in-law, Radhamma, she became involved in social service. In 1955, she founded Vanita Samaja, a non-profit focused on women's empowerment and community development, and opened 52 branches under it.

== Career ==
Keshavamurthy entered politics in 1972 as a candidate for the Indian National Congress and won the Davangere seat, defeating K.G. Maheshwarappa. She served as an MLA from 1972 to 1983. After losing the 1983 election to Mohammed Iqbal of the IND party, she returned to the Karnataka Legislative Assembly in 1989 by winning the Mayakonda constituency.

Throughout her political career, she held roles including Minister of Primary and Secondary Education, Deputy Speaker of the Legislative Assembly, Minister of Small and Large Industries, and Deputy Chairperson of the Karnataka Legislative Assembly. As Education Minister, she promoted Kannada medium education for early grades and supported the development of high schools in rural areas.

== Death ==
Nagamma Keshavamurthy died on 16 March 2024 at the age of 90 at her home in P.J. Badanga, Davangere. She had been dealing with age-related health issues. She is survived by her younger son, Jayanth.
