= H. Siddhaveerappa =

Indian politician

Minister of Law, Government of Karnataka
- In office 1975 – August 1977

Minister of Health and Family Welfare, Government of Karnataka
- In office 1972–1975

Leader of the Opposition in Mysore Legislative Assembly
- In office 23 December 1970 – 14 April 1971
- Preceded by: S. Shivappa
- Succeeded by: H. D. Deve Gowda

Minister of Home and Industry, Government of Karnataka
- In office 30 March 1952 – 19 August 1956
- Preceded by: T. Mariappa

Member of Mysore Legislative Assembly for Harihar
- In office 1967–1978
- Preceded by: Ganji Veerappa
- Succeeded by: P. Basavana Gowda
- In office 1952–1957
- Preceded by: Constituency established
- Succeeded by: Malalkere Ramappa

Personal details
- Born: 12 June 1906 Hanagavadi, Chitradurga, Kingdom of Mysore (now in Davangere, Karnataka, India)
- Died: 28 April 1981 (aged 74) Bangalore, Karnataka, India
- Party: Indian National Congress
- Other political affiliations: Indian National Congress (R)
- Spouse: Mahadevamma
- Education: Fergusson College
- Profession: Barrister; politician

Hanagavadi Siddhaveerappa (12 June 1906 – 28 April 1981) was an Indian barrister and politician from the State of Karnataka. He was a leader of the Indian National Congress and held multiple portfolios in the government of Karnataka including Home, Agriculture, Industries, Health, Information, and Municipal Governance. He also served as leader of the opposition in the Mysore Legislative Assembly between 1970 and 1971.

== Early life ==
Siddhaveerappa was born on 12 June 1906 in Hanagavadi, a village in Harihar taluk, in hitherto Chitradurga district (now part of Davanagere district) of the erstwhile Kingdom of Mysore (now in Karnataka). His family belonged to the Hindu family of Lingayats. He was the eldest of three children to his farmer father Gurusiddappa. The family grew up in poverty and led a hand-to-mouth existence.

Siddhaveerappa completing his schooling in Davanagere before moving to Mysore to pursue a degree in Maharaja's College, Mysore. He involved himself in student politics during this time and was elected secretary of the student union of the college. He went to secure a law degree from Fergusson College in Pune. Later, he began practice in Davanagere, usually taking up criminal more than civil cases. During this time, in the early 1940s, he also worked toward welfare of the local farmers, helping them with procuring farming implements among others.

== Career ==
Siddhaveerappa's first contested in an election for the presidency of the Chitradurga District Board in 1943, which he lost. He was successful at the second attempt, in 1946. Under his leadership, a higher secondary school was established in Kodaganur. In 1952, the first legislative assembly election of the newly formed Mysore State of independent India, he successfully contested the Harihar constituency with an Indian National Congress (INC) ticket. Siddhaveerappa was appointed the Minister of Home Affairs as part of the Hanumanthaiah ministry. He also held other portfolios during this term such as Agriculture, Horticulture, Transport, and Industry. He held the portfolios even during the chief ministership of Kadidal Manjappa that lasted a few months until 1956. After being denied an INC ticket for ten years, which saw two Assembly elections, he contested with a Janata Party (JP) ticket in 1967. Again contesting the Harihar seat, he won the election by a small margin of 504 votes. The JP secured the second most seats in the Assembly and was the opposition party to the INC government headed by Veerendra Patil. Siddhaveerappa served as the leader of the opposition between December 1970 and April 1971.

Following Siddhaveerappa's reentry into the Assembly in 1972 saw a contest between D. Devaraj Urs and himself for chief ministership. Siddhaveerappa was confident on being conferred the post considering Prime Minister Indira Gandhi had campaigned for him in Davanagere prior to the election, and had called him the next major leader of the State. However, the post went to Urs, and Siddhaveerappa was appointed the Minister of Health and Family Welfare in his cabinet. He also held the Law portfolio later, before resigning as minister in August 1977. He retired from political life that year, and spent the rest of his life in Davanagere and Bangalore. Siddhaveerappa died on 28 April 1981 in Bangalore, aged 74.

== See also ==
- Politics of Karnataka
