= Shamanuru Shivashankarappa =

Indian politician (1931–2025)

Member of Parliament, Lok Sabha
- In office 10 March 1998 – 26 April 1999
- Constituency: Davanagere

Minister of Horticulture and Agricultural Marketing, Government of Karnataka
- In office 2013–2016
- Succeeded by: S. S. Mallikarjun
- Constituency: Davangere South

Member of Karnataka Legislative Assembly
- In office 2008–2025
- Preceded by: Constituency established
- Succeeded by: Samarth Mallikarjun Shamanur
- Constituency: Davangere South
- In office 2004–2007
- Preceded by: S. S. Mallikarjun
- Succeeded by: Constituency ceased to exist
- Constituency: Davangere

Personal details
- Born: 16 June 1931 Davanagere, Kingdom of Mysore, India
- Died: 14 December 2025 (aged 94) Bangalore, Karnataka, India
- Party: Indian National Congress
- Spouse: Late Smt S.S Parvatamma
- Children: 3 sons including S. S. Mallikarjun and 4 daughters
- Relatives: Prabha Mallikarjun (daughter-in-law)

Shamanuru Shivashankarappa (16 June 1931 – 14 December 2025) was an Indian politician from the state of Karnataka who was a Member of the Legislative Assembly of Davanagere South Assembly constituency.

== Career ==
A veteran Congressman, Shivashankarappa was the treasurer of Karnataka Pradesh Congress Committee for the three decades and was also the president of the All India Veerashaiva Mahasabha. He belonged to the Sadar Lingayat community. As a well known educationalist and industrialist, he was the chairman of Bapuji Educational Association which owns a chain of educational institutions including Bapuji Institute of Engineering & Technology and many professional institutions of higher education, and also owned a group of industries known as Shamanur Group, which have sugar and distilleries as their prime business. He was also the team chairman and owner of the now-defunct Shamanoor Davangere Diamonds in the Karnataka Premier League, playing between 2009 and 2010. He was the co-producer of the 1970 Kannada movie Boregowda Bangalorige Banda.

== Personal life and death ==
Shivashankarappa's son S. S. Mallikarjun, Minister for Mines and Geology, Horticulture Government of Karnataka, is a Member of the Legislative Assembly representing Davanagere North Assembly constituency.

Shivashankarappa died from multiple organ failure in Bangalore on 14 December 2025, at the age of 94.
