= Belludi =

Coordinates: 14°27′N 75°47′E

- village
- Interactive map of Belludi
- Country: India
- State: Karnataka
- District: Davanagere
- Talukas: Harihar

Population (2001)
  - Total: 6,847

Languages
  - Official: Kannada
- Time zone: UTC+5:30 (IST)
- Postal code: 577601

Belludi is a village in the southern state of Karnataka, India. It is located in the Harihar taluk of Davanagere district in Karnataka.

== Demographics ==
As of 2001 India census, Belludi had a population of 6847 with 3600 males and 3247 females.

== See also ==
- Davanagere
- Districts of Karnataka
