= Yellamma Temple, Saundatti =

Indian pilgrimage destination

Renuka Yellamma Temple
- ರೇಣುಕಾ ಯಲ್ಲಮ್ಮ ದೇವಿ ದೇವಸ್ಥಾನ
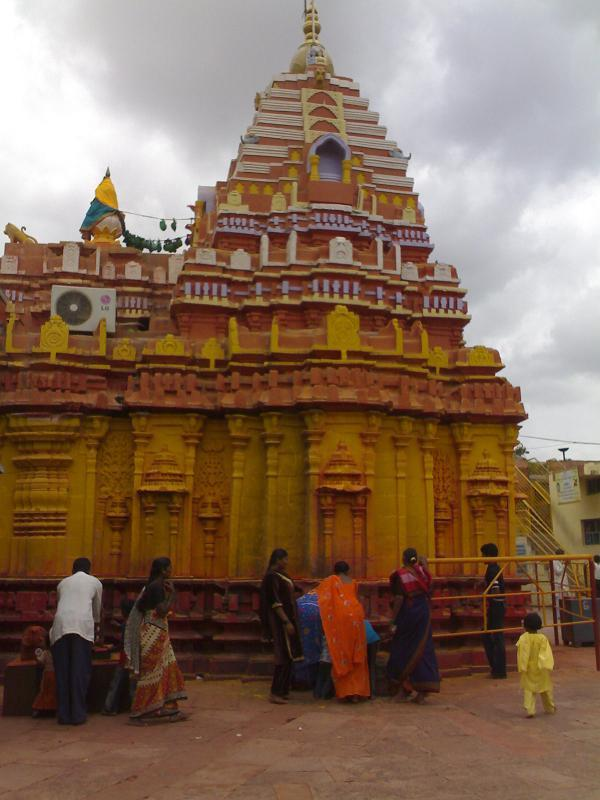
- Renuka Temple, Savadatti

- Location of Yellamma Temple, Saundatti

Religion
- Affiliation: Hinduism
- District: Belagavi
- Deity: Yellamma or Renuka

Location
- Location: Saundatti
- State: Karnataka
- Country: India
- Interactive map of Renuka Yellamma Temple
- Coordinates: 15.754°N 75.16°E

Architecture
- Type: Jain architecture of the Chalukya and Rashtrakuta Style
- Creator: Bomappa Naik of Raybag
- Completed: 1514
- Temple: 1

Yellamma Temple, also known as Renuka Temple (Kannada: ರೇಣುಕಾ ಯಲ್ಲಮ್ಮ ದೇವಿ ದೇವಸ್ಥಾನ), is a temple of Goddess (Devi) Renuka and a pilgrimage destination located about 5 kilometres (3.1 mi) away from the town of Saundatti in the Indian state of Karnataka. It is situated on a hilltop known earlier as Siddhachal Parvat and now known as "Yellammanna Gudda", named after the temple. The deity in the temple is the goddess Yellamma or Ellama or Renuka, revered as a fertility goddess. The temple is associated with the ancient Devadasi practice of dedicating girls to the temple, which the Government of Karnataka eradicated in 1982 through Devadasi Prohibition Act. The hill, a part of the Sidhachal or Ramagiri hill range which overlooks the Malaprabha river, contains archaeological evidences of occupation dating to the mid-8th to mid-11th centuries of the early Rashtrakuta or late Chalukya period, and includes megalithic tombs which predate these periods.

== Location ==
The hill on which the Yellamma Temple sits is part of the Sidhachal or Ramagiri range, oriented east–west and overlooking the Malaprabha river near the town of Savadatti. While the temple 5 kilometres (3.1 mi) away from the town, the town itself is 112 kilometres (70 mi) away from Belagavi, the district headquarters. Dharwad and Hubli are two other major cities which are at a distance of 38 kilometres (24 mi) and 58 kilometres (36 mi) respectively from Savadatti.

== History ==
The temple was built in 1514 by Bomappa Nayaka of Raybag (Bommappa Nayaka of Raibog). According to archaeological evidence found around the temple, a temple existed here either during the early Rashtrakuta or late Chalukyan period from the mid-8th to the mid-11th centuries. The megalithic tombs found here are dated to a much earlier period. Also seen on the hill are potsherds of early historic redware dated to the 3rd century BCE to the 3rd century CE, in addition to megalithic blackware and redware. It is believed that the Yellamma fertility cult was prevalent here even during the Chalukyan period, following their taking possession of this region from the Kadambas of Banavasi.

Another place of worship is the sacred "Yogarbavi Satyabamma Kunda" or tank at the lower end of the hill, where devotees bathe and put on new clothes before proceeding to the temple for worship. A notable custom observed here is called "Nimmana", which involves the circumambulation of the "Sathyamma Temple" with neem leaves in their mouths. The temple deity is also known as Jagadamba, meaning "Mother of the Universe" and is believed to be a form of Kali.

The temple has been under the management of the Government of Karnataka since 1975. Facilities for pilgrims visiting the temples, like Dharmashalas (free guest houses), health centers, and other basic facilities, have been created by the government.

== Features ==
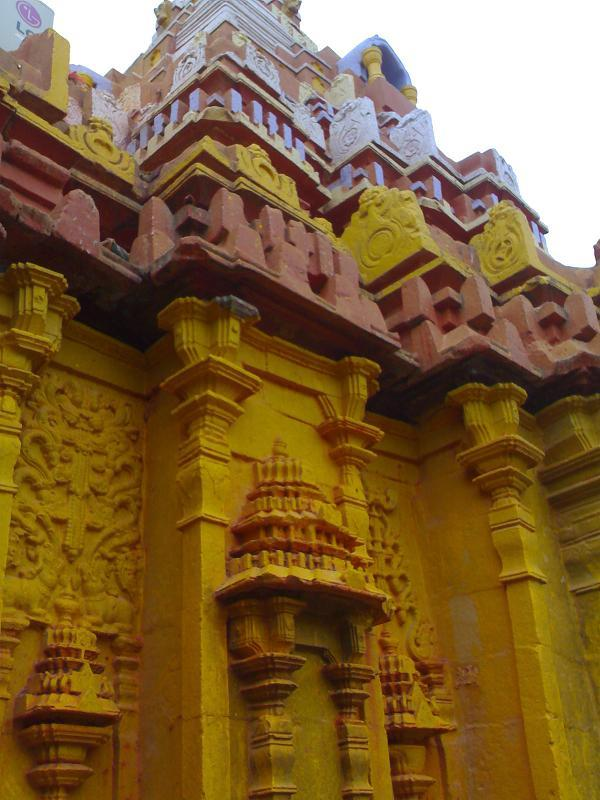
Renuka temple at Yallammagudda

The Yellamma Temple is built in the Chalukyan and Rashtrakuta style. According to the government gazetteer, the goddess worshiped in the temple is associated with Parasurama's (an incarnation of Vishnu) mother Renuka, the wife of the sage Jamadagni. She is revered as one of the Saptamatrika or seven divine mothers, who protected the earth and its rulers. The goddess is also known as Yelumakkaltai, meaning "the mother of seven children" in Kannada language. She is a cult figure worshiped by the pastoral community of the Dhangar and Kurumbas of southern Maharashtra and North Karnataka.

There are three water tanks or ponds at the back side of the temple known as Kumkum Kundam, Yoni Kundam, and Arihan Kundam. These are considered holy and are places where people bathe and offer worship. There is also a sacred well called the Jogal bhavi; the water of this well is believed to cure skin diseases. Another location adjacent to the temple known as Parasurama Kshetra is believed to be the site where Lord Parausrama sat in the penance.

Within the temple precincts stand shrines dedicated to Lord Ganesh, Mallikarjun, Parashuram, Eknath, and Siddeshwar.

== Legend ==
Jamadagni was one of the Saptarishi or Seven Sages. In his early life, he studied hard and achieved erudition in his studies of the Vedas. He is said to have acquired knowledge regarding the science of weapons without any formal instruction, with the guidance of his father.

After achieving the status of a Rishi, Jamadagni visited several holy sites and finally reached the palace of King Prasenajit of the Solar Dynasty. He fell in love with his daughter, Princess Renuka, upon seeing her, and asked the king for her hand in marriage. Subsequently, the two were married, and Renuka took on an ascetic life. Five sons were born to them: Ṛumaṇvān, Suhotra, Vasu, Viśvāvasu, and Rama, later known as Parshurama. Later the couple started to engage in penances or tapasya along the banks of the river Narmada. Jamadagni granted Renuka a boon that she would be able to bring water in unbaked clay pots, as long as her chastity was pure.

According to the Brahmanda Purana, Renuka once went to the banks of the river Narmada to fetch some water. There, she observed the king of the Shalva kingdom making love with his queen in the water. She stood there, mesmerised by the beauty of the sight. But her chastity was broken and the pot cracked. By the time she reached the hermitage of her husband with the water, she was quite late. The weary Jamadagni was furious when he divined the reason for her delay, and called forth each of his sons, one after the other, to kill her. Each of them refused to kill their mother.

Parashurama, however, came forth and beheaded his mother with an axe to show his obedience to his father's words. The sage exiled his four older sons to the forests due to their disobedience and cursed them either to become ash or live for eternity as transgenders.

Jamadagni was pleased by Parashurama's devotion to him, he granted his son any boon of his choice. Parashurama wisely wished for his mother to be restored to life, and this was granted. Jamadagni used his powers to fix Renuka's head to her body and she was alive again. Another legend narrates that in the hurry to see his mother alive again, he took a dark-skinned woman's head and attached it to his mother's body. That's how Renuka was also called Yellamma. In the pictures of Yellamma, she has a darker face than her body which represents that she has another woman's head. Other legends narrate that when she was beheaded, Renuka's head multiplied by hundreds and moved to different regions in India. This inspired her transgender children to deify and worship her.

The transgender children were found by their mother who accepted them as they were. From then on, Renuka alias Yellamma was known as the mother goddess of transgender people. Even today, you'll see a lot of transgender people on the temple premises.

But Parshuram left his mother and father. As he was Lord Vishnu's sixth incarnation, he was on his divine path. Later he became a disciple of Dattatreya. He started practising his penance and meditation with Lord Dattatreya in the Western Ghats.

Later, Jamadagni was entrusted by Brahma to take care of the divine cow Kamadhenu. where Jamadagni was killed by Kartavirya Arjuna due to the latter's lust for the cow. And Renuka committed sati (where a woman, out of mourn, throws herself on the cremation fire of her husband). Parashurama avenged his parents' deaths by killing Kartavirya's army 21 times, to relieve the Earth of her burden.

After this story, Parashurama returned to Dattatreya to continue his penances. Parashurama is a Chiranjeevi (immortal) being in Hindu Mythology. Parashurama is believed to be alive and does his penance in the Himalayas. His mentor, Dattatreya, still roams in the western ghats.

== Festivals ==
Festivals are held at the venue of the temple twice a year during October to April. A very large number of pilgrims from Karnataka Andhra Pradesh, Goa, and Maharashtra visit the temple during these festivals.

== See also ==
- Marikamba Temple, Sirsi

== Bibliography ==
- Mowli, V. Chandra (1992). "Jogin" girl-child labour studies. Sterling Publishers. ISBN 978-81-207-1415-1.
- Singh, Nagendra Kr (1 January 1997). Divine Prostitution. APH Publishing. ISBN 978-81-7024-821-7.
- Subburaj, V.V.K. (2009). Tourist Guide to Karnataka. Sura Books. ISBN 978-81-7478-062-1.
- Yoffee, Norman (2007). Negotiating the Past in the Past: Identity, Memory, and Landscape in Archaeological Research. University of Arizona Press. ISBN 978-0-8165-2670-3.
