= List of leaders of the opposition in the Karnataka Legislative Assembly =

Leader of Opposition of the Indian state of Karnataka

Leader of the Opposition of Karnataka Legislative Assembly
- Karnāṭaka Vidhānasabheya Virōdha Pakṣada Nāyaka
- Emblem of Karnataka

- Flag of India

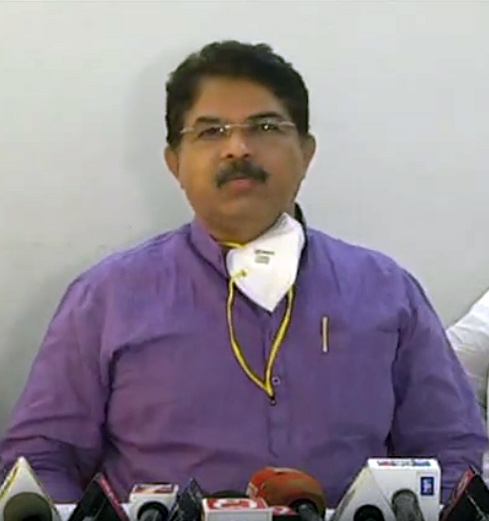
- Incumbent; R. Ashoka since 17 November 2023
- Karnataka Legislative Assembly
- Style: The Honourable
- Status: Leader of Opposition
- Member of: Karnataka Legislative Assembly
- Nominator: Members of the Official Opposition in the Karnataka Legislative Assembly
- Appointer: Speaker of Karnataka Legislative Assembly
- Term length: During the life of the Karnataka Legislative Assembly (5 years)
- Inaugural holder: S. Shivappa
- Formation: 22 March 1962; 64 years ago
- Deputy: Arvind Bellad ,Deputy Leader of the Opposition of the Karnataka Legislative Assembly

The leader of the opposition of the Karnataka Legislative Assembly is the politician who leads the official opposition in the Karnataka Legislative Assembly. The position is currently held by R. Ashoka of the Bharatiya Janata Party.

== Leaders of opposition ==
#	Portrait	Name	Constituency	Tenure			Assembly	Party
Mysore
1		S. Shivappa	Shravanabelagola	22 March 1962	28 January 1967	8 years, 229 days	3rd (1962 election)	Praja Socialist Party
1		S. Shivappa	Shravanabelagola	15 March 1967	22 February 1970	8 years, 229 days	4th (1967 election)	Praja Socialist Party
1		S. Shivappa	Shravanabelagola	23 February 1970	22 December 1970	8 years, 229 days	4th (1967 election)	Praja Socialist Party
2		H. Siddhaveerappa	Harihar	23 December 1970	14 April 1971	112 days	4th (1967 election)	Indian National Congress (R)
3		H. D. Deve Gowda	Holenarasipur	24 March 1972	17 March 1976	3 years, 359 days	5th (1972 election)	Indian National Congress (O)
Karanataka
1		H. T. Krishnappa	Nagamangala	18 March 1976	25 October 1976	221 days		Indian National Congress (O)
2		H. D. Deve Gowda	Holenarasipur	18 November 1976	31 December 1977	1 year, 43 days		United Opposition
3		S. R. Bommai	Hubli Rural	18 March 1978	17 July 1979	1 year, 121 days	6th (1978 election)	Janata Party
4		R. Gundu Rao	Somvarpet	17 December 1979	22 January 1980	36 days	6th (1978 election)	Indian National Congress (I)
5		D. Devaraj Urs	Hunsur	23 January 1980	11 June 1981	1 year, 139 days	6th (1978 election)	Indian National Congress (U)
6		A. Lakshmisagar	Chickpet	10 February 1982	8 January 1983	332 days	6th (1978 election)	Janata Party
7		Veerappa Moily	Karkala	24 January 1983	2 January 1985	1 year, 344 days	7th (1983 election)	Indian National Congress (I)
8		Sarekoppa Bangarappa	Soraba	18 March 1985	11 June 1986	1 year, 85 days	8th (1985 election)	Indian National Congress (I)
9		K. S. Nagarathanamma	Gundlupet	29 January 1987	21 April 1989	2 years, 82 days	8th (1985 election)	Indian National Congress (I)
10		D. B. Chandregowda	Tirthahalli	18 December 1989	17 August 1992	2 years, 243 days	9th (1989 election)	Janata Dal
11		R. V. Deshpande	Haliyal	18 August 1992	16 December 1994	2 years, 120 days	9th (1989 election)	Janata Dal
12		B. S. Yediyurappa	Shikaripur	27 December 1994	18 December 1996	1 year, 357 days	10th (1994 election)	Bharatiya Janata Party
13		Mallikarjun Kharge	Gurmitkal	19 December 1996	7 July 1999	2 years, 200 days	10th (1994 election)	Indian National Congress
14		Jagadish Shettar	Hubli Rural	26 October 1999	23 February 2004	4 years, 120 days	11th (1999 election)	Bharatiya Janata Party
(12)		B. S. Yediyurappa	Shikaripur	9 June 2004	2 February 2006	1 year, 238 days	12th (2004 election)	Bharatiya Janata Party
15		Dharam Singh	Jevargi	8 February 2006	28 November 2007	1 year, 293 days	12th (2004 election)	Indian National Congress
(13)		Mallikarjun Kharge	Chittapur	5 June 2008	28 May 2009	357 days	13th (2008 election)	Indian National Congress
16		Siddaramaiah	Varuna	8 June 2009	12 May 2013	3 years, 338 days	13th (2008 election)	Indian National Congress
17		H. D. Kumaraswamy	Ramanagara	31 May 2013	22 January 2014	236 days	14th (2013 election)	Janata Dal (Secular)
(14)		Jagadish Shettar	Hubli-Dharwad Central	23 January 2014	17 May 2018	4 years, 114 days	14th (2013 election)	Bharatiya Janata Party
(12)		B. S. Yediyurappa	Shikaripura	25 May 2018	26 July 2019	1 year, 62 days	15th (2018 election)	Bharatiya Janata Party
(16)		Siddaramaiah	Badami	9 October 2019	20 May 2023	3 years, 223 days	15th (2018 election)	Indian National Congress
Interim		Basavaraj Bommai	Shiggaon	4 July 2023	17 November 2023	136 days	16th (2023 election)	Bharatiya Janata Party
18		R. Ashoka	Padmanaba Nagar	17 November 2023	Incumbent	2 years, 294 days	16th (2023 election)	Bharatiya Janata Party

== Statistics ==
#	Opposition Leader	Party	Term of office	
#	Opposition Leader	Party	Longest continuous term	Total duration of Opposition Leader
1	Jagadish Shettar	BJP	4 years, 120 days	8 years, 234 days
2	S. Shivappa	PSP	8 years, 229 days	8 years, 229 days
3	Siddaramaiah	INC	3 years, 338 days	7 years, 196 days
4	H. D. Deve Gowda	INC(O) / UOP	3 years, 359 days	5 years, 37 days
5	Mallikarjun Kharge	INC	2 years, 200 days	3 years, 192 days
6	B. S. Yediyurappa	BJP	1 year, 357 days	4 years, 292 days
7	D. B. Chandregowda	JD	2 years, 243 days	2 years, 243 days
8	R. V. Deshpande	JD	2 year, 120 days	2 year, 120 days
9	K. S. Nagarathanamma	INC(I)	2 years, 82 days	2 years, 82 days
10	Veerappa Moily	INC(I)	1 year, 344 days	1 year, 344 days
11	Dharam Singh	INC	1 year, 293 days	1 year, 293 days
12	D. Devaraj Urs	INC(U)	1 year, 139 days	1 year, 139 days
13	S. R. Bommai	JP	1 year, 121 days	1 year, 121 days
14	Sarekoppa Bangarappa	INC(I)	1 year, 85 days	1 year, 85 days
15	R. Ashoka	BJP	2 years, 294 days	2 years, 294 days
16	A. Lakshmisagar	JP	332 days	332 days
17	H. D. Kumaraswamy	JD(S)	236 days	236 days
18	H. T. Krishnappa	INC(O)	221 days	221 days
19	Basavaraj Bommai	BJP	136 days	136 days
20	H. Siddhaveerappa	INC(R)	112 days	112 days
21	R. Gundu Rao	INC(I)	36 days	36 days
