= K. Mallappa =

K. Mallappa may refer to

- Kollur Mallappa, Indian Politician from Kalyana-Karnataka.
- Kannavara Mallappa, Indian Politician from Davanagere, Karnataka.
- Kuttur Mallappa, Indian Politician from Kodagu, Karnataka.
