= Samarth Mallikarjun Shamanur =

Indian politician

Member of Karnataka Legislative Assembly
- Incumbent
- Assumed office 4 May 2026
- Preceded by: Shamanuru Shivashankarappa
- Constituency: Davanagere South

Personal details
- Born: 2 February 1999 (age 27) Davangere, Karnataka, India
- Party: Indian National Congress
- Parents: S. S. Mallikarjun (father); Prabha Mallikarjun (mother)
- Relatives: Shamanuru Shivashankarappa (Grandfather)
- Education: Bachelor of Arts (BA) from University of Exeter, United Kingdom

Samarth Mallikarjun Shamanur (born 9 February 1999) is an Indian politician from Karnataka. He is a member of the Karnataka Legislative Assembly from Davanagere South in Davangere district representing the Indian National Congress.

== Early life and education ==
Samarth is from Davangere. He is the grandson of Lingayat leader late Shamanur Shivashankarappa and son of Member of Parliament Prabha Mallikarjun and minister S.S. Mallikarjun. He studied at Kodaikanal International School up to Class 12 in 2017 and completed his BA in Business and Management at University of Exeter, United Kingdom, in 2020.

== Career ==
Shamanur became an MLA for the first time making a winning debut in the 2026 by election from Davangere South Assembly constituency representing the Indian National Congress. He polled 69,578 votes and defeated his nearest rival, Shrinivasa T. Dasakariyappa of the Bharatiya Janata Party, by a margin of 5708 votes.
