= Davanagere Assembly constituency =

Former Assembly constituency in Karnataka, India

Coordinates: 14.467043°N 75.919995°E

Davanagere
- Former constituency for the Karnataka Legislative Assembly

Constituency details
- Country: India
- Region: South India
- State: Karnataka
- Division: Bangalore
- District: Davanagere
- Lok Sabha constituency: Davangere
- Established: 1951
- Abolished: 2008

Davanagere Assembly constituency was one of the constituencies in Karnataka state assembly in India until 2008 when it was made defunct. It was part of Davangere Lok Sabha constituency.

== Members of the Legislative Assembly ==
Election	Member	Party
1952	Ballari Siddamma	Indian National Congress
1957	K. T. Jambanna	Praja Socialist Party
1962	Kondajji Basappa	Indian National Congress
1967	Kondajji Basappa	Indian National Congress
1972	Nagamma. C. Keshavamurthy	Indian National Congress
1978	Pampapathi	Communist Party of India
1983	Pampapathi	Communist Party of India
1985	Pampapathi	Communist Party of India
1989	Y. M. Veeranna	Indian National Congress
1994	Shamanuru Shivashankarappa	Independent politician
1998 By-election (Note: Resigned on 20 March 1998)	S. S. Mallikarjun	Indian National Congress
1999	S. S. Mallikarjun	Indian National Congress
2004	Shamanuru Shivashankarappa	Indian National Congress

== Election results ==
=== Assembly Election 2004 ===
2004 Karnataka Legislative Assembly election : Davanagere
Party	Candidate	Votes	%	±%
INC	Shamanuru Shivashankarappa	63,499	56.74%	▲8.27
BJP	Yashawantha Rao	41,366	36.96%	▼7.69
JD(S)	Yajaman Mothi Veeranna	4,896	4.37%	▼1.75
JP	Shamanur Geetha	1,194	1.07%	New
Kannada Nadu Party	Rekha. M. C	967	0.86%	New
Margin of victory		22,133	19.78%	▲15.95
Turnout		111,922	55.35%	▼7.05
Total valid votes		111,922		
Registered electors		202,216		▲9.49
INC hold		Swing	▲8.27	

=== Assembly Election 1999 ===
1999 Karnataka Legislative Assembly election : Davanagere
Party	Candidate	Votes	%	±%
INC	S. S. Mallikarjun	54,401	48.47%	New
BJP	Yashawantha Rao	50,108	44.65%	▲10.29
JD(S)	Syed Saifulla	6,869	6.12%	New
Margin of victory		4,293	3.83%	▲2.36
Turnout		115,254	62.40%	▼0.14
Total valid votes		112,229		
Rejected ballots		2,889	2.51%	▲0.70
Registered electors		184,694		▲7.52
INC gain from Independent		Swing	▲12.64	

=== Assembly Election 1994 ===
1994 Karnataka Legislative Assembly election : Davanagere
Party	Candidate	Votes	%	±%
Independent	Shamanuru Shivashankarappa	37,794	35.83%	New
BJP	K. B. Shankaranarayana	36,247	34.36%	New
CPI	Pampapathi	16,497	15.64%	▼8.43
INC	K. H. Athaulla Khan	13,447	12.75%	New
Margin of victory		1,547	1.47%	▼24.12
Turnout		107,429	62.54%	▲8.51
Total valid votes		105,488		
Rejected ballots		1,941	1.81%	▼5.04
Registered electors		171,781		▼2.81
Independent gain from INC		Swing	▼13.82	

=== Assembly Election 1989 ===
1989 Karnataka Legislative Assembly election : Davanagere
Party	Candidate	Votes	%	±%
INC	Y. M. Veeranna	44,167	49.65%	▲6.79
CPI	Pampapathi	21,408	24.07%	▼23.86
Independent	T. G. Shivayogappa	10,820	12.16%	New
JP	Mardan Sab	10,264	11.54%	New
Margin of victory		22,759	25.59%	▲20.52
Turnout		95,494	54.03%	▼7.31
Total valid votes		88,948		
Rejected ballots		6,546	6.85%	▲5.24
Registered electors		176,756		▲43.46
INC gain from CPI		Swing	▲1.72	

=== Assembly Election 1985 ===
1985 Karnataka Legislative Assembly election : Davanagere
Party	Candidate	Votes	%	±%
CPI	Pampapathi	35,639	47.93%	▼0.27
INC	Yajaman Mothi Veeranna	31,866	42.86%	▲23.64
Independent	K. Mohamed Koya	3,692	4.97%	New
BJP	K. B. Shankaranarayana	1,975	2.66%	▼4.99
Independent	G. B. Jyothibannadavar	672	0.90%	New
Margin of victory		3,773	5.07%	▼19.46
Turnout		75,572	61.34%	▼13.23
Total valid votes		74,354		
Rejected ballots		1,218	1.61%	▼0.40
Registered electors		123,207		▲18.87
CPI hold		Swing	▼0.27	

=== Assembly Election 1983 ===
1983 Karnataka Legislative Assembly election : Davanagere
Party	Candidate	Votes	%	±%
CPI	Pampapathi	36,507	48.20%	▼2.88
Independent	H. Mohammed Iqbal Sab	17,928	23.67%	New
INC	Nagamma. C. Keshavamurthy	14,555	19.22%	▲9.76
BJP	S. A. Ravindranatha	5,795	7.65%	New
Independent	Mudegowadra Mallikarjunappa	467	0.62%	New
Margin of victory		18,579	24.53%	▲12.17
Turnout		77,290	74.57%	▲2.15
Total valid votes		75,737		
Rejected ballots		1,553	2.01%	▼0.51
Registered electors		103,647		▲16.07
CPI hold		Swing	▼2.88	

=== Assembly Election 1978 ===
1978 Karnataka Legislative Assembly election : Davanagere
Party	Candidate	Votes	%	±%
CPI	Pampapathi	32,199	51.08%	New
JP	K. Mallappa	24,410	38.72%	New
INC	G. Khaja Mohiuddin Sab	5,961	9.46%	▼61.24
Margin of victory		7,789	12.36%	▼36.78
Turnout		64,668	72.42%	▲14.96
Total valid votes		63,038		
Rejected ballots		1,630	2.52%	▲2.52
Registered electors		89,299		▲6.20
CPI gain from INC		Swing	▼19.62	

=== Assembly Election 1972 ===
1972 Mysore State Legislative Assembly election : Davanagere
Party	Candidate	Votes	%	±%
INC	Nagamma. C. Keshavamurthy	33,163	70.70%	▲28.05
SSP	K. G. Maheshwarappa	10,113	21.56%	New
ABJS	Hanumantappa	2,988	6.37%	New
Independent	H. Nagappa	456	0.97%	New
Margin of victory		23,050	49.14%	▲40.86
Turnout		48,313	57.46%	▼9.81
Total valid votes		46,906		
Registered electors		84,085		▲24.43
INC hold		Swing	▲28.05	

=== Assembly Election 1967 ===
1967 Mysore State Legislative Assembly election : Davanagere
Party	Candidate	Votes	%	±%
INC	Kondajji Basappa	17,809	42.65%	▼12.63
PSP	C. Keshava Murthy	14,351	34.37%	▼7.49
Independent	M. C. Narasimhan	8,218	19.68%	New
Independent	H. R. Sindhe	828	1.98%	New
Margin of victory		3,458	8.28%	▼5.14
Turnout		45,457	67.27%	▲1.38
Total valid votes		41,760		
Registered electors		67,578		▼0.56
INC hold		Swing	▼12.63	

=== Assembly Election 1962 ===
1962 Mysore State Legislative Assembly election : Davanagere
Party	Candidate	Votes	%	±%
INC	Kondajji Basappa	23,739	55.28%	▲15.78
PSP	C. Keshava Murthy	17,977	41.86%	▼16.89
ABJS	K. T. Jambanna	854	1.99%	New
Independent	G. M. Annadanaiah	372	0.87%	New
Margin of victory		5,762	13.42%	▼5.83
Turnout		44,775	65.89%	▲4.12
Total valid votes		42,942		
Registered electors		67,956		▲26.03
INC gain from PSP		Swing	▼3.47	

=== Assembly Election 1957 ===
1957 Mysore State Legislative Assembly election : Davanagere
Party	Candidate	Votes	%	±%
PSP	K. T. Jambanna	19,568	58.75%	New
INC	Ganji Veerappa	13,157	39.50%	▼20.63
Independent	G. M. Annadanaiah	582	1.75%	New
Margin of victory		6,411	19.25%	▼25.60
Turnout		33,307	61.77%	▲7.66
Total valid votes		33,307		
Registered electors		53,922		▲27.11
PSP gain from INC		Swing	▼1.38	

=== Assembly Election 1952 ===
1952 Mysore State Legislative Assembly election : Davanagere
Party	Candidate	Votes	%	±%
INC	Ballari Siddamma	13,802	60.13%	New
Independent	Bondade Hanumantha Rao	3,508	15.28%	New
Socialist Party (India)	K. Veerabhadrappa	2,834	12.35%	New
Independent	Itagi Vedamurthy	1,101	4.80%	New
CPI	Murugaiah	1,056	4.60%	New
Independent	G. M. Annadanaiah	652	2.84%	New
Margin of victory		10,294	44.85%	
Turnout		22,953	54.11%	
Total valid votes		22,953		
Registered electors		42,421		
INC win (new seat)				

== See also ==
- List of constituencies of the Karnataka Legislative Assembly
