= Davanagere South Assembly constituency =

Legislative Assembly constituency in Karnataka State, India

Coordinates: 14.43°N 75.92°E

Davanagere South
- Constituency No. 107 for the Karnataka Legislative Assembly

Constituency details
- Country: India
- Region: South India
- State: Karnataka
- District: Davanagere
- Lok Sabha constituency: Davangere
- Established: 2008
- Total electors: 210,708
- Reservation: None

Member of Legislative Assembly
- 16th Karnataka Legislative Assembly
- Incumbent Samarth Mallikarjun Shamanur
- Party: Indian National Congress
- Elected year: 2026

Davanagere South Assembly constituency is one of the 224 Legislative Assembly constituencies of Karnataka in India.

It is part of Davanagere district and Davangere Lok Sabha constituency.

== Members of Legislative Assembly ==
Year	Member	Party
Until 2008: Seat does not exist. See Davanagere Assembly constituency
2008	Shamanuru Shivashankarappa	Indian National Congress
2013	Shamanuru Shivashankarappa	Indian National Congress
2018	Shamanuru Shivashankarappa	Indian National Congress
2023	Shamanuru Shivashankarappa	Indian National Congress
2026^	Samarth Mallikarjun Shamanur	Indian National Congress

^ - bypoll

== Election results ==
=== 2026 by-election ===
2026 Davanagere by-election: Davanagere
Party	Candidate	Votes	%	±%
INC	Samarth Mallikarjun Shamanur	69,578	43.95	▼13.64
BJP	Srinivas T. Dasakariyappa	63,870	40.34	▲1.80
SDPI	Afsar Kodlipete	18,975	11.99	▲11.09
Independent	12 Independent Candidates	4,098	2.58	
Others	Other 10 Parties	1,286	0.82	
NOTA	None of the above	511	0.32	▼0.13
Majority		5,708	3.61	▼15.44
Turnout		158,318	68.55	▼0.93
INC hold		Swing		

=== 2023 ===
2023 Karnataka Legislative Assembly election : Davanagere South
Party	Candidate	Votes	%	±%
INC	Shamanuru Shivashankarappa	84,298	57.59	▲5.14
BJP	Ajay Kumar. B. G	56,410	38.54	▼2.24
SDPI	Ismail Zabiulla	1,311	0.90	New
JD(S)	Amanulla Khan. J	1,296	0.89	▼3.53
NOTA	None of the above	655	0.45	▼0.20
Margin of victory		27,888	19.05	▲7.38
Turnout		146,406	69.48	▲3.64
Total valid votes		146,382		
Registered electors		210,708		▲1.91
INC hold		Swing	▲5.14	

=== 2018 ===
2018 Karnataka Legislative Assembly election : Davanagere South
Party	Candidate	Votes	%	±%
INC	Shamanuru Shivashankarappa	71,369	52.45	▲3.33
BJP	Yashavantha Rao Jadhav	55,485	40.78	▲25.02
JD(S)	Amanulla Khan. J	6,020	4.42	▼14.95
NOTA	None of the above	888	0.65	New
AIMEP	Nowshin Taj	869	0.64	New
Margin of victory		15,884	11.67	▼18.07
Turnout		136,123	65.84	▼0.21
Total valid votes		136,073		
Registered electors		206,760		▲13.37
INC hold		Swing	▲3.33	

=== 2013 ===
2013 Karnataka Legislative Assembly election : Davanagere South
Party	Candidate	Votes	%	±%
INC	Shamanuru Shivashankarappa	66,320	49.12	▲7.62
JD(S)	Karekatte Syed Saifulla	26,162	19.37	▲0.29
BJP	B. Lokesh	21,282	15.76	▼19.41
KJP	B. M. Satish	3,200	2.37	New
Margin of victory		40,158	29.74	▲23.41
Turnout		120,462	66.05	▲3.85
Total valid votes		135,030		
Registered electors		182,370		▲12.97
INC hold		Swing	▲7.62	

=== 2008 ===
2008 Karnataka Legislative Assembly election : Davanagere South
Party	Candidate	Votes	%	±%
INC	Shamanuru Shivashankarappa	41,675	41.50	New
BJP	Yashavantha Rao Jadhav	35,317	35.17	New
JD(S)	H. S. Nagaraj	19,163	19.08	New
Independent	K. M. Ravishankar	1,301	1.30	New
BSP	Narendra Rao Pawar	899	0.90	New
IUML	T. Athaulla	723	0.72	New
Margin of victory		6,358	6.33	
Turnout		100,418	62.20	
Total valid votes		100,415		
Registered electors		161,435		
INC win (new seat)				

== See also ==
- List of constituencies of the Karnataka Legislative Assembly
- Davanagere district
