= Kondajji Basappa =

Indian politician

Personal details
- Born: 11 December 1915; Kondajji
- Died: 14 November 1982 (aged 66); Bangalore

Kondajji Basappa (born 12 November 1915, Kondajji, Davanagere, Karnataka, India; died 14 November 1982, Bangalore, India) was an Indian politician who was the Member of Parliament in the Lok Sabha for Davanagere, Karnataka and a leader in the Karnataka Scouts and Guides movement.

== Biography ==
Kondajji Basappa was a graduate in science from Bangalore University and did his LL.B from Pune University. He took an active role in promotion of Scout and Guide Movement in Karnataka. Basappa entered into politics in the year 1962 by becoming MLA from Davangere and elected twice as a Member of Parliament in 1971 and 1977. He served as the Union Deputy Minister for Health and Family Planning

Basappa worked as Assistant District Commissioner, District Commissioner of Chitradurga, Assistant State Commissioner of Chitradurga Division and State Secretary before he became State Chief Commissioner. He held this post for the longest period from 1964 till he died in November 1982.

== Career highlights ==
1942 : Assistant District Commissioner (Scouts) Davanagere
1946 : President, District Board, Chitradurga
1948 : Received Gold Medal for Public Service from the Maharaja of Mysore
1950-1960: Member, Syndicate of the University of Mysore, District Commissioner (Scouts), Chitradurga
1951 : Indian Representative, 7th World Scout Jamborre at Bad Ischl and World Scout Conference in Austria.
1955 : Assistant State Commissioner (Scouts), Chitradurga Division
1962 : Elected to the Mysore Legislative Assemble from Davanagere; Deputy Minister for Co-operation, Information and Excise, Mysore
1962 : Headquarters Commissioner for Public relations, Bharat Scouts and Guides
1962-1967: Chairman, State Handloom Advisory Board, State Warehousing corporation
1963 : State Secretary, Bharat Scouts and Guides
1964-1982: State Chief Commissioner, 1982 Bharat Scouts and Guides, Karnataka
1967 : Re-elected to the Mysore Legislative Assembly from Davanagere
1968 : Awarded the Silver Elephant of the Bharat Scouts and Guides in recognition for his distinguished services to the movement
1968-1971: Member, Board of Regents University of Agricultural Sciences, Bangalore
1969 : Secretary, Mysore Pradesh Congress Committee
1971 : Elected as Member of Parliament (Lok Sabha) from Chitradurga
1971 : Establishment & Development of Scout and Guide Campus at Kondajji Village
1972-1974: Union Deputy Minister for Health and Family Planning
1973 : Indian Delegate to the World Scout Conference at Nairobi
1974 : Leader of the Indian Team in the International Conference on Family Planning at Manila, Visited Thailand and Hong Kong
1976 : Donated Rs 1 lakh for the cause of scout and guide movement in Karnataka
1976 : Founder President of "Jaladarshini jananapeeta" a residential multipurpose Educational Institution, Kondajji Village.
1977 : Re-elected to the Parliament from Davanagere Davangere (Lok Sabha constituency)
1982 : Rajyotsava award for the meritorious services rendered to Scouts and Guides movement
1982 : Died in Bangalore on 14 November.
