= Y. Nagappa =

Indian politician (died 2020)

Y. Nagappa (1944/1945 – 27 October 2020) was an Indian politician who served as Social Welfare Minister in Karnataka state, India. Nagappa, a doctor, had practised at Akkialur in Hangal taluk of Haveri District before joining active politics about 30 years ago. He was the Medical officer at Harihar Govt hospital before joining active politics. He had won the Harihar seat for three terms. In his 2008 run for congress he was beaten by B. P. Harish. He died on 27 October 2020 at the age of 75.
