= Jagalur Assembly constituency =

Legislative Assembly constituency in Karnataka State, India

Coordinates: 14.52°N 76.34°E

Jagalur
- Constituency No. 103 for the Karnataka Legislative Assembly

Constituency details
- Country: India
- Region: South India
- State: Karnataka
- District: Davanagere and Vijayanagara
- Lok Sabha constituency: Davangere
- Established: 1951 (first establishment); 1961 (second establishment)
- Total electors: 193,028
- Reservation: ST

Member of Legislative Assembly
- 16th Karnataka Legislative Assembly
- Incumbent B. Devendrappa
- Party: Indian National Congress
- Elected year: 2023
- Preceded by: S. V. Ramachandra

Jagalur Assembly constituency is one of the 224 Legislative Assembly constituencies of Karnataka in India.

It is part of Davanagere district and is reserved for candidates belonging to the Scheduled Tribes. As of 2023, it is represented by B. Devendrappa of the Indian National Congress.

== Members of the Legislative Assembly ==
Election	Member	Party
1952	Mushir-u. L.-mulk. J. Mohamed Imamsab	Kisan Mazdoor Praja Party
1962	M. N. Krishna Singh	Indian National Congress
1967	J. R. Halsaswamy	Indian National Congress
1972	G. H. Ashwath Reddy	Indian National Congress
1978	G. H. Ashwath Reddy	Janata Party
1983	G. H. Ashwath Reddy	Indian National Congress
1985	G. H. Ashwath Reddy	Indian National Congress
1989	G. H. Ashwath Reddy	Indian National Congress
1994	M. Basappa	Karnataka Pradesh Congress Committee
1999	G. H. Ashwath Reddy	Independent politician
2004	T. Gurusiddana Gowda	Bharatiya Janata Party
2008	S. V. Ramachandra	Indian National Congress
2011 By-election	S. V. Ramachandra	Bharatiya Janata Party
2013	H. P. Rajesh	Indian National Congress
2018	S. V. Ramachandra	Bharatiya Janata Party
2023	B. Devendrappa	Indian National Congress

== Election results ==
=== Assembly Election 2023 ===
2023 Karnataka Legislative Assembly election : Jagalur
Party	Candidate	Votes	%	±%
INC	B. Devendrappa	50,765	32.44%	▼1.08
BJP	S. V. Ramachandra	49,891	31.88%	▼21.34
Independent	H. P. Rajesh	49,442	31.60%	New
NOTA	None of the above	1,996	1.28%	▲0.70
JD(S)	Mallapura Devaraj	1,972	1.26%	▼7.77
Margin of victory		874	0.56%	▼19.14
Turnout		156,728	81.19%	▲3.11
Total valid votes		156,483		
Registered electors		193,028		▲1.53
INC gain from BJP		Swing	▼20.78	

=== Assembly Election 2018 ===
2018 Karnataka Legislative Assembly election : Jagalur
Party	Candidate	Votes	%	±%
BJP	S. V. Ramachandra	78,948	53.22%	▲51.99
INC	H. P. Rajesh	49,727	33.52%	▼18.27
JD(S)	B. Devendrappa	13,401	9.03%	▲6.15
Independent	A. L. Pushpa Lakshmana Swamy	1,856	1.25%	New
NOTA	None of the above	855	0.58%	New
Margin of victory		29,221	19.70%	▼4.86
Turnout		148,439	78.08%	▼0.90
Total valid votes		148,335		
Registered electors		190,117		▲13.62
BJP gain from INC		Swing	▲1.43	

=== Assembly Election 2013 ===
2013 Karnataka Legislative Assembly election : Jagalur
Party	Candidate	Votes	%	±%
INC	H. P. Rajesh	77,805	51.79%	▲27.32
KJP	S. V. Ramachandra	40,915	27.24%	New
JD(S)	Dr. G. Rangaiah	4,325	2.88%	▼0.37
BJP	Dr. Basappa Arun Kumar	1,845	1.23%	▼34.64
Independent	S. Halappa	1,304	0.87%	New
Independent	M. H. Ramanna	1,079	0.72%	New
Independent	Bheemappa. G. N	985	0.66%	New
Margin of victory		36,890	24.56%	▲20.77
Turnout		132,149	78.98%	▲2.57
Total valid votes		150,223		
Registered electors		167,330		▲9.30
INC gain from BJP		Swing	▲15.92	

=== Assembly By-election 2011 ===
2011 Karnataka Legislative Assembly by-election : Jagalur
Party	Candidate	Votes	%	±%
BJP	S. V. Ramachandra	41,961	35.87%	▲1.76
Independent	H. P. Rajesh	37,528	32.08%	New
INC	Y. Devendrappa	28,625	24.47%	▼12.32
JD(S)	H. Manjunatha	3,804	3.25%	▼3.62
Independent	Bheemappa. G. N	2,846	2.43%	New
Independent	C. Manjunatha	880	0.75%	New
Independent	G. B. Chowdappa	732	0.63%	New
Margin of victory		4,433	3.79%	▲1.11
Turnout		116,977	76.41%	▲4.37
Total valid votes		116,977		
Registered electors		153,096		▲5.13
BJP gain from INC		Swing	▼0.92	

=== Assembly Election 2008 ===
2008 Karnataka Legislative Assembly election : Jagalur
Party	Candidate	Votes	%	±%
INC	S. V. Ramachandra	38,574	36.79%	▲6.76
BJP	H. P. Rajesh	35,763	34.11%	▼2.32
JD(S)	K. Sreenivasa	7,208	6.87%	▼7.97
BSP	K. P. Palaiah	6,471	6.17%	New
Independent	S. Viswanath	6,354	6.06%	New
SKP	Hutchhavvanahalli Manjunath	4,140	3.95%	New
Independent	M. Hanumanthappa	2,246	2.14%	New
CPI(ML)L	D. Chowdappa	2,024	1.93%	New
SP	S. Pandurangappa	1,042	0.99%	New
Margin of victory		2,811	2.68%	▼3.71
Turnout		104,917	72.04%	▲1.69
Total valid votes		104,846		
Registered electors		145,628		▼3.34
INC gain from BJP		Swing	▲0.36	

=== Assembly Election 2004 ===
2004 Karnataka Legislative Assembly election : Jagalur
Party	Candidate	Votes	%	±%
BJP	T. Gurusiddana Gowda	38,530	36.43%	▲16.03
INC	G. H. Ashwath Reddy	31,767	30.03%	▲3.60
JD(S)	M. Basappa	15,698	14.84%	▲13.13
JP	Venkatesh. S. M	7,339	6.94%	New
Independent	K. P. Palaiah	4,389	4.15%	New
Independent	Manjunath. K	2,921	2.76%	New
Independent	Jayanna. K	1,891	1.79%	New
Urs Samyuktha Paksha	Manjunatha. K. B	1,198	1.13%	New
Independent	Shanthakumari. M. V	1,062	1.00%	New
Margin of victory		6,763	6.39%	▼18.64
Turnout		105,990	70.35%	▼4.09
Total valid votes		105,772		
Registered electors		150,659		▲10.30
BJP gain from Independent		Swing	▼15.03	

=== Assembly Election 1999 ===
1999 Karnataka Legislative Assembly election : Jagalur
Party	Candidate	Votes	%	±%
Independent	G. H. Ashwath Reddy	48,865	51.46%	New
INC	M. Basappa	25,097	26.43%	▼6.35
BJP	T. Gurusiddana Gowda	19,367	20.40%	▼0.15
JD(S)	M. Hanumanthappa	1,627	1.71%	New
Margin of victory		23,768	25.03%	▲22.08
Turnout		101,678	74.44%	▲3.59
Total valid votes		94,956		
Rejected ballots		6,684	6.57%	▲4.63
Registered electors		136,592		▲1.89
Independent gain from INC		Swing	▲15.73	

=== Assembly Election 1994 ===
1994 Karnataka Legislative Assembly election : Jagalur
Party	Candidate	Votes	%	±%
INC	M. Basappa	33,272	35.73%	New
INC	G. H. Ashwath Reddy	30,526	32.78%	▼20.17
BJP	T. Gurusiddana Gowda	19,134	20.55%	New
JD	Koncha Jayadevappa	7,373	7.92%	▼35.62
SP	Krishnamurthy	1,461	1.57%	New
BSP	R. Obelesha Ghatti	786	0.84%	New
Margin of victory		2,746	2.95%	▼6.47
Turnout		94,973	70.85%	▼1.93
Total valid votes		93,126		
Rejected ballots		1,847	1.94%	▼3.06
Registered electors		134,057		▲8.86
INC gain from INC		Swing	▼17.22	

=== Assembly Election 1989 ===
1989 Karnataka Legislative Assembly election : Jagalur
Party	Candidate	Votes	%	±%
INC	G. H. Ashwath Reddy	45,085	52.95%	▲3.37
JD	M. Basappa	37,068	43.54%	New
JP	K. B. Kallarudreshappa	2,639	3.10%	New
Margin of victory		8,017	9.42%	▲7.15
Turnout		89,621	72.78%	▼0.32
Total valid votes		85,142		
Rejected ballots		4,479	5.00%	▲3.22
Registered electors		123,142		▲23.97
INC hold		Swing	▲3.37	

=== Assembly Election 1985 ===
1985 Karnataka Legislative Assembly election : Jagalur
Party	Candidate	Votes	%	±%
INC	G. H. Ashwath Reddy	35,365	49.58%	▼9.14
JP	M. Basappa	33,749	47.32%	▲8.94
Independent	Kollarappa	684	0.96%	New
BJP	Thippeswamy	625	0.88%	▼1.33
Margin of victory		1,616	2.27%	▼18.08
Turnout		72,616	73.10%	▼1.58
Total valid votes		71,324		
Rejected ballots		1,292	1.78%	▼0.70
Registered electors		99,336		▲11.81
INC hold		Swing	▼9.14	

=== Assembly Election 1983 ===
1983 Karnataka Legislative Assembly election : Jagalur
Party	Candidate	Votes	%	±%
INC	G. H. Ashwath Reddy	37,998	58.72%	▲38.86
JP	M. Basappa	24,832	38.38%	▼1.74
BJP	Gandugali	1,427	2.21%	New
Independent	Ramanjaneya	448	0.69%	New
Margin of victory		13,166	20.35%	▲20.25
Turnout		66,353	74.68%	▲1.68
Total valid votes		64,705		
Rejected ballots		1,648	2.48%	▼0.01
Registered electors		88,845		▲7.72
INC gain from JP		Swing	▲18.60	

=== Assembly Election 1978 ===
1978 Karnataka Legislative Assembly election : Jagalur
Party	Candidate	Votes	%	±%
JP	G. H. Ashwath Reddy	23,555	40.12%	New
INC(I)	B. H. Sreenivasa Naik	23,496	40.02%	New
INC	P. G. Nagana Gowda	11,658	19.86%	▼35.45
Margin of victory		59	0.10%	▼17.09
Turnout		60,206	73.00%	▲8.96
Total valid votes		58,709		
Rejected ballots		1,497	2.49%	▲2.49
Registered electors		82,478		▲9.17
JP gain from INC		Swing	▼15.19	

=== Assembly Election 1972 ===
1972 Mysore State Legislative Assembly election : Jagalur
Party	Candidate	Votes	%	±%
INC	G. H. Ashwath Reddy	26,132	55.31%	▼3.49
INC(O)	B. H. Sreenivasa Naik	18,010	38.12%	New
ABJS	D. B. Raju	3,102	6.57%	New
Margin of victory		8,122	17.19%	▼0.41
Turnout		48,382	64.04%	▼10.76
Total valid votes		47,244		
Registered electors		75,553		▲14.78
INC hold		Swing	▼3.49	

=== Assembly Election 1967 ===
1967 Mysore State Legislative Assembly election : Jagalur
Party	Candidate	Votes	%	±%
INC	J. R. Halsaswamy	27,787	58.80%	▲14.57
PSP	T. Thoriyappa	19,468	41.20%	▲12.86
Margin of victory		8,319	17.60%	▲1.71
Turnout		49,234	74.80%	▲20.45
Total valid votes		47,255		
Registered electors		65,825		▲13.69
INC hold		Swing	▲14.57	

=== Assembly Election 1962 ===
1962 Mysore State Legislative Assembly election : Jagalur
Party	Candidate	Votes	%	±%
INC	M. N. Krishna Singh	12,390	44.23%	▲1.03
PSP	K. V. Venkatappa	7,938	28.34%	New
Independent	A. D. Krishnappa	3,513	12.54%	New
Independent	Yallappa	2,244	8.01%	New
Independent	H. C. Keshavan	1,260	4.50%	New
Independent	B. H. Parthaiah	665	2.37%	New
Margin of victory		4,452	15.89%	▲2.29
Turnout		31,468	54.35%	▼11.87
Total valid votes		28,010		
Registered electors		57,899		▲54.19
INC gain from KMPP		Swing	▼12.57	

=== Assembly Election 1952 ===
1952 Mysore State Legislative Assembly election : Jagalur
Party	Candidate	Votes	%	±%
KMPP	Mushir-Ul-Mulk J. Mohamed Imamsab	14,123	56.80%	New
INC	J. S. Kallappa	10,741	43.20%	New
Margin of victory		3,382	13.60%	
Turnout		24,864	66.22%	
Total valid votes		24,864		
Registered electors		37,550		
KMPP win (new seat)				

== See also ==
- List of constituencies of the Karnataka Legislative Assembly
- Davanagere district
