= Prabha Mallikarjun =

Indian politician (born 1976)

Dr.Prabha Mallikarjun
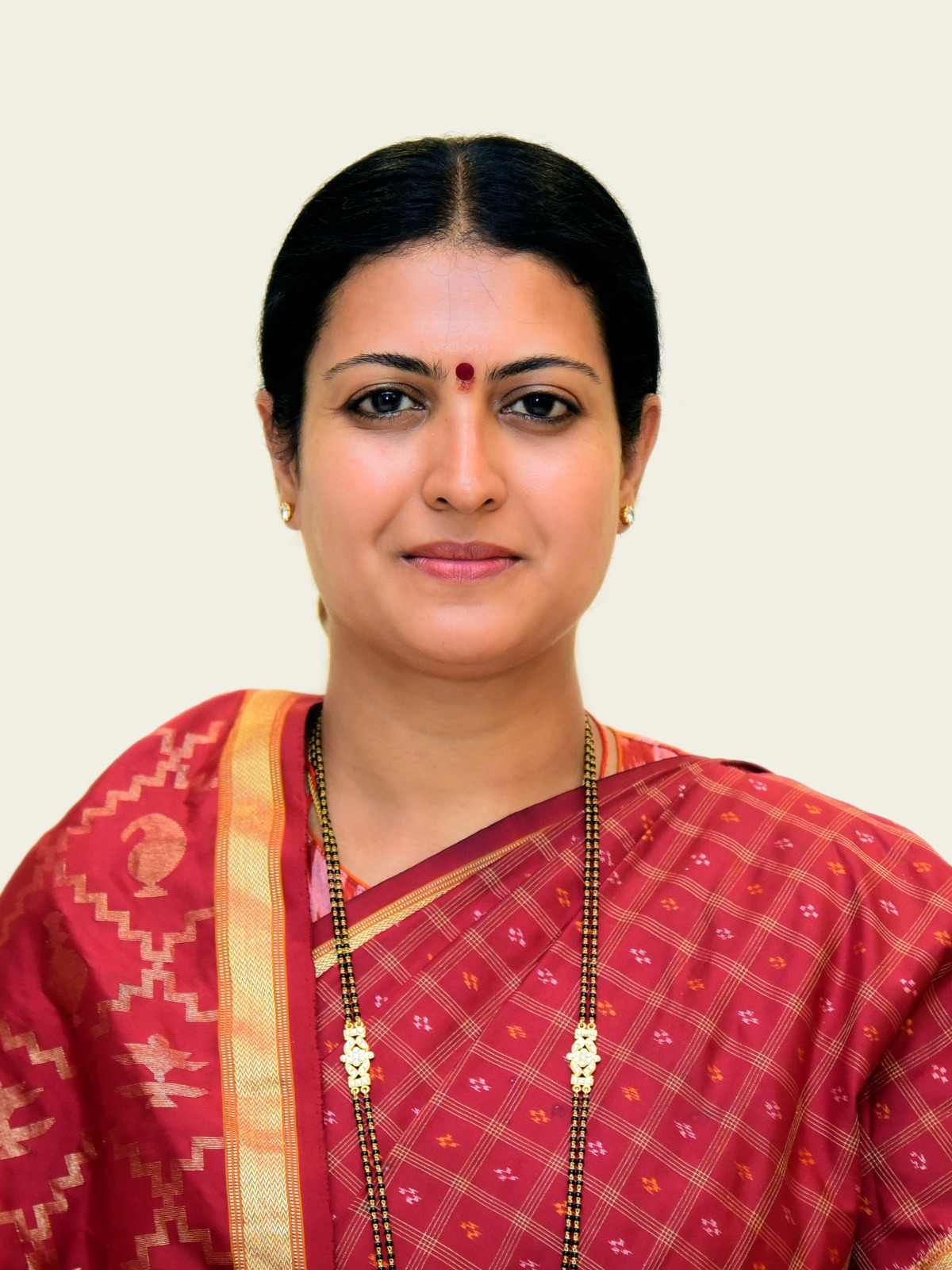

Member of Parliament, Lok Sabha
- Incumbent
- Assumed office 4 June 2024
- Preceded by: G. M. Siddeshwara
- Constituency: Davanagere

Personal details
- Born: 15 March 1976 (age 50) Harihar, Karnataka, India
- Party: Indian National Congress
- Spouse: S. S. Mallikarjun
- Relatives: Shamanuru Shivashankarappa (father-in-law)
- Education: Bachelor of Dental Surgery (BDS)
- Alma mater: Bapuji Dental College and Hospital, Davanagere
- Occupation: Politician
- Profession: Dentist and Healthcare Activist
- Website: https://drprabhamallikarjun.com/

Prabha Mallikarjun (born 15 March 1976) is an Indian politician and a Member of Parliament representing Davanagere in 18th Lok Sabha.

== Early life and background ==
She is a dentist by qualification (Obtained Degree in 1998), and a healthcare activist.

Born to Girijamma and the KG Parameshwarappa, Prabha Mallikarjun hails from an agricultural family in Kakkargolla village, Davangere taluk. She completed her primary and secondary education at PolyFiber CBSE School, Kumarapattanam, Harihar.

== Political career ==
She won the Davanagere seat in the 2024 Indian general elections as an Indian National Congress Candidate. She defeated Gayithri Siddeshwara of BJP by a margin of 26,094 votes.

She also served as a Board member of the Bapuji Educational Association, Davanagere

== Personal life ==
She is married to S. S. Mallikarjun (Son of Shamanuru Shivashankarappa, a former Minister and former MLA from Davanagere South), who is the Minister of Mines & Geology and Horticulture in Government of Karnataka on 1 February 1998. She is the mother of three children: Samarth, Shrestha, and Shiva
