= S. A. Ravindranath =

Indian politician

Cabinet Minister Government of Karnataka
- In office 30 May 2008 – 13 May 2013
- Ministry: Term
- Minister of Horticulture: 22 September 2010 - 13 May 2013
- Minister of Sugarcane Development & Directorate: 22 September 2010 - 13 May 2013
- Minister of Agriculture: 30 May 2008 - 22 September 2010
- In office 21 June 2006 – 8 October 2007
- Ministry: Term
- Minister of Rural Water Supply & Sanitation: 21 June 2006 - 8 October 2007
- Minister of Sugarcane Development & Directorate: 21 June 2006 - 8 October 2007

Member of Karnataka Legislative Assembly
- In office 2018–2023
- Preceded by: S. S. Mallikarjun
- Constituency: Davangere North
- In office 2008–2013
- Succeeded by: S. S. Mallikarjun
- Constituency: Davangere North
- In office 1994–2008
- Preceded by: Nagamma Keshavamurthy
- Succeeded by: M. Basavaraja Naika
- Constituency: Mayakonda

Personal details
- Born: 26 November 1946 (age 79) Shiramagondanahalli, Davangere Taluk, Chitradurga, Kingdom of Mysore (now Davangere District, Karnataka), India
- Party: Bharatiya Janata party

S. A. Ravindranath (born 26 November 1946) is an Indian politician. Born in Shiramagondanahalli village of Davangere District, he represents the Bharatiya Janata Party (BJP) from Davangere North Constituency in the Karnataka Legislative Assembly. He is a senior Cabinet minister in the BJP government of Karnataka.

== Career ==
A longtime member of the Bharatiya Janata Party, he has been elected to the Karnataka Legislative Assembly for four consecutive terms since 1994. He was elected as MLA from Mayakonda constituency for three consecutive terms and is currently representing the Davanagere North constituency. He won the May 2008 Karnataka state elections with the highest margin of over 53,000 votes against his nearest rival. Earlier, he was the Minister for Sugar and Rural water supply in the BJP-Janata Dal (Secular) coalition government headed by H.D.Kumaraswamy. Following the historic victory of the BJP in Karnataka, he was sworn-in as a Cabinet minister in the Yeddyurappa government on 30 May 2008 and was entrusted with the Agriculture portfolio. Later he served as the Minister for Horticulture in the D. V. Sadananda Gowda ministry and Shettar ministry. He was also the minister in charge for Davanagere district at that time. He is credited with bringing the BJP to power in the Davanagere City Corporation for the first time in 2007 with an overwhelming majority. However, the actual credit should go to Congress Leader S. S. Mallikarjun whose papers were rejected at the last moment.
