= Amaravati Colony Junction railway station =

Railway station in Karnataka, India

General information
- Location: Doggalli Bathi Road, Davangere, Karnataka; India
- Coordinates: 14.49822°N 75.85409°E
- Elevation: 551 metres (1,808 ft)
- System: Indian Railways station
- Owner: Indian Railways
- Operator: South Western Railway
- Platforms: 3
- Tracks: 7

Construction
- Structure type: Standard (on ground station)
- Parking: Yes
- Cycle facilities: No

Other information
- Status: Functioning
- Station code: AVC
- Zone(s): South Western Railway
- Division(s): Mysore
Location
- Location within Karnataka Location within India

Amaravati Colony Junction railway station is a small railway station in Davanagere district, Karnataka. Its code is AVC. It serves Davangere and Harihar town. The station consists of three platforms. The platforms are not well sheltered.

== Trains ==
- Harihar–Hosapete Passenger
