= B. P. Harish =

Indian politician (born 1961)

B. P. Harish (born 1961) is an Indian politician from Karnataka. He is an MLA from Harihar Assembly constituency in Davangere district. He won the 2023 Karnataka Legislative Assembly election representing Bharatiya Janata Party.

== Early life and education ==
Harish is from Harihar, Davanagere district. His father Basavanagowda P is a farmer. He completed his graduation in arts in 1981 at M. S. B. College, Davangere.

== Career ==
Harish won the Harihar Assembly constituency representing the Bharatiya Janata Party in the 2023 Karnataka Legislative Assembly election. He secured 63,924 votes, defeating his closest rival and incumbent MLA, N. H. Srinivasa of the Indian National Congress, by a margin of 4,304 votes. In the previous election in 2018 Karnataka Legislative Assembly election, he lost to the same candidate. He first became an MLA after winning the 2008 Karnataka Legislative Assembly election.
