= Harihar Assembly constituency =

Legislative Assembly constituency in Karnataka State, India

Coordinates: 14.52°N 75.81°E

Harihar
- Constituency No. 105 for the Karnataka Legislative Assembly

Constituency details
- Country: India
- Region: South India
- State: Karnataka
- District: Davanagere
- Lok Sabha constituency: Davangere
- Established: 1951
- Total electors: 207,589
- Reservation: None

Member of Legislative Assembly
- 16th Karnataka Legislative Assembly
- Incumbent B. P. Harish
- Party: Bharatiya Janata Party
- Elected year: 2023
- Preceded by: S. Ramappa

Harihar Assembly constituency is one of the 224 Legislative Assembly constituencies of Karnataka in India.

It is part of Davanagere district. B. P. Harish is the current MLA from Harihar.

== Members of the Legislative Assembly ==
Election	Member	Party
1952	H. Siddhaveerappa	Indian National Congress
1957	M. Ramappa	Praja Socialist Party
1962	Ganji Veerappa	Indian National Congress
1967	H. Siddhaveerappa	Independent politician
1972	H. Siddhaveerappa	Indian National Congress
1978	P. Basavana Gowda	Indian National Congress
1980 By-election	C. Odeyar	Janata Party
1983	Kannavara Mallappa	Janata Party
1985	B. G. Kotrappa	Janata Party
1989	Dr. Y. Nagappa	Indian National Congress
1994	H. Shivappa	Independent politician
1999	Dr. Y. Nagappa	Indian National Congress
2004	Dr. Y. Nagappa	Indian National Congress
2008	B. P. Harish	Bharatiya Janata Party
2013	H. S. Shivashankar	Janata Dal
2018	S. Ramappa	Indian National Congress
2023	B. P. Harish	Bharatiya Janata Party

== Election results ==
=== Assembly Election 2023 ===
2023 Karnataka Legislative Assembly election : Harihar
Party	Candidate	Votes	%	±%
BJP	B. P. Harish	63,924	37.94%	▲3.05
INC	Srinivasa N. H. (Nandigavi)	59,620	35.39%	▼3.90
JD(S)	H. S. Shivashankar	40,580	24.09%	▲0.93
AAP	Ganeshappa K. Durgada	1,488	0.88%	New
NOTA	None of the above	557	0.33%	▼0.28
Margin of victory		4,304	2.55%	▼1.85
Turnout		168,551	81.19%	▲3.46
Total valid votes		168,473		
Registered electors		207,589		▼2.16
BJP gain from INC		Swing	▼1.35	

=== Assembly Election 2018 ===
2018 Karnataka Legislative Assembly election : Harihar
Party	Candidate	Votes	%	±%
INC	S. Ramappa	64,801	39.29%	▲9.08
BJP	B. P. Harish	57,541	34.89%	▲30.46
JD(S)	H. S. Shivashankar	38,204	23.16%	▼21.22
Indian New Congress Party	P. Beerappa	1,714	1.04%	New
NOTA	None of the above	1,006	0.61%	New
Margin of victory		7,260	4.40%	▼9.77
Turnout		164,935	77.73%	▲0.03
Total valid votes		164,927		
Registered electors		212,182		▲9.30
INC gain from JD(S)		Swing	▼5.09	

=== Assembly Election 2013 ===
2013 Karnataka Legislative Assembly election : Harihar
Party	Candidate	Votes	%	±%
JD(S)	H. S. Shivashankar	59,666	44.38%	▲15.43
INC	S. Ramappa	40,613	30.21%	▲1.71
KJP	B. P. Harish	37,786	28.10%	New
BJP	S. M. Veeresha Hanagavadi	5,959	4.43%	▼33.33
Bharatiya Praja Paksha	H. Nagaraj Palegar	1,479	1.10%	New
Independent	B. P. Harish	933	0.69%	New
Margin of victory		19,053	14.17%	▲5.36
Turnout		150,826	77.70%	▲2.70
Total valid votes		134,450		
Registered electors		194,121		▲16.27
JD(S) gain from BJP		Swing	▲6.62	

=== Assembly Election 2008 ===
2008 Karnataka Legislative Assembly election : Harihar
Party	Candidate	Votes	%	±%
BJP	B. P. Harish	47,238	37.76%	▲6.95
JD(S)	H. Shivappa	36,220	28.95%	▼3.81
INC	Dr. Y. Nagappa	35,652	28.50%	▼4.73
Independent	M. Bashasab	1,682	1.34%	New
Swarna Yuga Party	Tejasvi V. Patel	1,326	1.06%	New
BSP	L. N. Niranjanamurthy	887	0.71%	New
Margin of victory		11,018	8.81%	▲8.34
Turnout		125,213	75.00%	▲5.46
Total valid votes		125,093		
Registered electors		166,957		▼4.45
BJP gain from INC		Swing	▲4.53	

=== Assembly Election 2004 ===
2004 Karnataka Legislative Assembly election : Harihar
Party	Candidate	Votes	%	±%
INC	Dr. Y. Nagappa	40,366	33.23%	▼17.02
JD(S)	H. Shivappa	39,797	32.76%	▲31.12
BJP	Harish P. Basavanagouda	37,424	30.81%	New
JP	Marulasiddappa. A	1,274	1.05%	New
Independent	Narendra Prakash. H. G	926	0.76%	New
Urs Samyuktha Paksha	Guru. H. N	829	0.68%	New
Margin of victory		569	0.47%	▼1.66
Turnout		121,516	69.54%	▼2.46
Total valid votes		121,465		
Registered electors		174,733		▲5.16
INC hold		Swing	▼17.02	

=== Assembly Election 1999 ===
1999 Karnataka Legislative Assembly election : Harihar
Party	Candidate	Votes	%	±%
INC	Dr. Y. Nagappa	57,406	50.25%	▲14.73
JD(U)	H. Shivappa	54,967	48.11%	New
JD(S)	Mukhdam Sab	1,872	1.64%	New
Margin of victory		2,439	2.13%	▲0.08
Turnout		119,636	72.00%	▼0.26
Total valid votes		114,245		
Rejected ballots		5,224	4.37%	▲2.41
Registered electors		166,153		▲12.34
INC gain from Independent		Swing	▲12.68	

=== Assembly Election 1994 ===
1994 Karnataka Legislative Assembly election : Harihar
Party	Candidate	Votes	%	±%
Independent	H. Shivappa	39,356	37.57%	New
INC	Dr. Y. Nagappa	37,210	35.52%	▼8.85
BJP	Harish P. Basavanagouda	17,844	17.03%	New
INC	Jigali. N. Rudragouda	8,654	8.26%	New
JD	B. G. Kotrappa	1,189	1.13%	▼24.99
Margin of victory		2,146	2.05%	▼16.20
Turnout		106,874	72.26%	▲4.48
Total valid votes		104,766		
Rejected ballots		2,096	1.96%	▼4.52
Registered electors		147,901		▲0.19
Independent gain from INC		Swing	▼6.80	

=== Assembly Election 1989 ===
1989 Karnataka Legislative Assembly election : Harihar
Party	Candidate	Votes	%	±%
INC	Dr. Y. Nagappa	41,513	44.37%	▼0.91
JD	Harish P. Basavanagouda	24,439	26.12%	New
Independent	N. Rudragowda	24,373	26.05%	New
JP	B. Mugdum	653	0.70%	New
Independent	B. K. Onkarappa	626	0.67%	New
Margin of victory		17,074	18.25%	▲12.45
Turnout		100,049	67.78%	▼1.16
Total valid votes		93,567		
Rejected ballots		6,482	6.48%	▲4.51
Registered electors		147,617		▲27.11
INC gain from JP		Swing	▼6.71	

=== Assembly Election 1985 ===
1985 Karnataka Legislative Assembly election : Harihar
Party	Candidate	Votes	%	±%
JP	B. G. Kotrappa	40,089	51.08%	▼7.13
INC	Y. Nagappa	35,539	45.28%	▲5.78
BJP	Veeranna	773	0.98%	New
Independent	Mohamed Hayath Sab	631	0.80%	New
Margin of victory		4,550	5.80%	▼12.91
Turnout		80,060	68.94%	▼4.68
Total valid votes		78,481		
Rejected ballots		1,579	1.97%	▼0.52
Registered electors		116,135		▲12.35
JP hold		Swing	▼7.13	

=== Assembly Election 1983 ===
1983 Karnataka Legislative Assembly election : Harihar
Party	Candidate	Votes	%	±%
JP	Kannavara Mallappa	43,196	58.21%	▼33.67
INC	H. Shivappa	29,309	39.50%	New
IC(S)	Mohan Kumar	1,241	1.67%	New
Margin of victory		13,887	18.71%	▼70.83
Turnout		76,105	73.62%	
Total valid votes		74,207		
Rejected ballots		1,898	2.49%	
Registered electors		103,370		
JP hold		Swing	▼33.67	

=== Assembly By-election 1980 ===
1980 Karnataka Legislative Assembly by-election : Harihar
Party	Candidate	Votes	%	±%
JP	C. Odeyar	12,902	91.88%	▲52.05
Independent	H. Jayappa	329	2.34%	New
Independent	H. M. V. (Veeresha)	269	1.92%	New
Independent	G. Nagappa	185	1.32%	New
Independent	G. N. Hegde	131	0.93%	New
Independent	H. G. Rudrappa	125	0.89%	New
Independent	K. Basappsa	101	0.72%	New
Margin of victory		12,573	89.54%	▲74.00
Total valid votes		14,042		
JP gain from INC(I)		Swing	▲36.50	

=== Assembly Election 1978 ===
1978 Karnataka Legislative Assembly election : Harihar
Party	Candidate	Votes	%	±%
INC(I)	P. Basavana Gowda	36,644	55.38%	New
JP	H. Shivappa	26,359	39.83%	New
INC	G. H. Tekoji Rao	2,588	3.91%	▼51.64
Independent	B. Gurulingappa	581	0.88%	New
Margin of victory		10,285	15.54%	▲1.63
Turnout		67,930	75.33%	▲3.25
Total valid votes		66,172		
Rejected ballots		1,758	2.59%	▲2.59
Registered electors		90,171		▼1.54
INC(I) gain from INC		Swing	▼0.17	

=== Assembly Election 1972 ===
1972 Mysore State Legislative Assembly election : Harihar
Party	Candidate	Votes	%	±%
INC	H. Siddhaveerappa	35,620	55.55%	▲6.11
INC(O)	Ganji Veerappa	26,704	41.65%	New
Independent	B. Gurulingappa	1,793	2.80%	New
Margin of victory		8,916	13.91%	▲12.78
Turnout		66,011	72.08%	▼6.57
Total valid votes		64,117		
Registered electors		91,580		▲53.67
INC gain from Independent		Swing	▲4.99	

=== Assembly Election 1967 ===
1967 Mysore State Legislative Assembly election : Harihar
Party	Candidate	Votes	%	±%
Independent	H. Siddhaveerappa	22,601	50.56%	New
INC	G. Veerappa	22,097	49.44%	▼1.82
Margin of victory		504	1.13%	▼4.33
Turnout		46,870	78.65%	▲5.47
Total valid votes		44,698		
Registered electors		59,595		▼6.00
Independent gain from INC		Swing	▼0.70	

=== Assembly Election 1962 ===
1962 Mysore State Legislative Assembly election : Harihar
Party	Candidate	Votes	%	±%
INC	Ganji Veerappa	22,528	51.26%	▲4.32
PSP	Y. Neelappa	20,127	45.80%	▼7.26
ABJS	S. R. Nandavarik	1,291	2.94%	New
Margin of victory		2,401	5.46%	▼0.67
Turnout		46,400	73.18%	▼5.94
Total valid votes		43,946		
Registered electors		63,401		▲19.84
INC gain from PSP		Swing	▼1.80	

=== Assembly Election 1957 ===
1957 Mysore State Legislative Assembly election : Harihar
Party	Candidate	Votes	%	±%
PSP	M. Ramappa	22,212	53.06%	New
INC	H. Siddaveerappa	19,647	46.94%	▼4.51
Margin of victory		2,565	6.13%	▼8.38
Turnout		41,859	79.12%	▲15.36
Total valid votes		41,859		
Registered electors		52,905		▲36.03
PSP gain from INC		Swing	▲1.61	

=== Assembly Election 1952 ===
1952 Mysore State Legislative Assembly election : Harihar
Party	Candidate	Votes	%	±%
INC	H. Siddhaveerappa	12,760	51.45%	New
Socialist Party (India)	M. Ramappa	9,162	36.95%	New
Independent	Nagosa	2,106	8.49%	New
Independent	M. Mahalingappa	771	3.11%	New
Margin of victory		3,598	14.51%	
Turnout		24,799	63.76%	
Total valid votes		24,799		
Registered electors		38,893		
INC win (new seat)				

== See also ==
- List of constituencies of the Karnataka Legislative Assembly
- Davanagere district
