= B. Devendrappa (politician) =

Indian politician (born 1962)

B. Devendrappa (born 1962) is an Indian politician from Karnataka. He is an MLA from Jagalur Assembly constituency which is reserved for ST community in Davangere district. He won the 2023 Karnataka Legislative Assembly election representing Indian National Congress.

== Early life and education ==
Devendrappa is born to a tribal family in Chikmammanahatti village, Jagalur taluk, Davangere district. His late father was Late Basappa was a farmer. His wife is a retired government employee. He completed his pre university course but discontinued his studies during his graduation at Government Arts College, Chitraduraga, in 1984. He served as a peon, a group D post, in a private school, Amar Bharati Vidyakendra, Jagalur, for 30 years from 1983 to 2013. After being elected as an MLA, he returned to the school in June 2023, swept the office and rang the bell to start the academic year.

== Career ==
Devendrappa left Janata Dal (Secular) and joined Congress in 2022. He got the ticket and won from Jagalur Assembly constituency representing Indian National Congress in the 2023 Karnataka Legislative Assembly election. He polled 50,765 votes with a vote share of 32.44 per cent and defeated his nearest rival, S. V. Ramachandra of Bharatiya Janata Party, by a narrow margin of 874 votes. Earlier in the 2018 Karnataka Legislative Assembly election he lost badly and could only finish third behind winner S. V. Ramachandra of Bharatiya Janata Party who polled 78,948 votes, and H. P. Rajesh of Indian National Congress, who finished second.
