= Davanagere North Assembly constituency =

Legislative Assembly constituency in Karnataka State, India

Coordinates: 14.48°N 75.92°E

Davanagere North
- Constituency No. 106 for the Karnataka Legislative Assembly

Constituency details
- Country: India
- Region: South India
- State: Karnataka
- District: Davanagere
- Lok Sabha constituency: Davangere
- Established: 2008
- Total electors: 241,278
- Reservation: None

Member of Legislative Assembly
- 16th Karnataka Legislative Assembly
- Incumbent S. S. Mallikarjun
- Party: Indian National Congress
- Elected year: 2023
- Preceded by: S. A. Ravindranath

Davanagere North Assembly constituency is one of the 224 Legislative Assembly constituencies of Karnataka in India.

It is part of Davanagere district.

== Members of the Legislative Assembly ==
Election	Member	Party
2008	S. A. Ravindranath	Bharatiya Janata Party
2013	S. S. Mallikarjun	Indian National Congress
2018	S. A. Ravindranath	Bharatiya Janata Party
2023	S. S. Mallikarjun	Indian National Congress

== Election results ==
=== Assembly Election 2023 ===
2023 Karnataka Legislative Assembly election : Davanagere North
Party	Candidate	Votes	%	±%
INC	S. S. Mallikarjun	94,019	56.00%	▲9.94
BJP	Lokikere Nagaraj	69,547	41.42%	▼7.23
UPP	Chandrashekar. B	1,143	0.68%	New
NOTA	None of the above	919	0.55%	▼0.13
Margin of victory		24,472	14.58%	▲11.99
Turnout		167,980	69.62%	▲4.15
Total valid votes		167,891		
Registered electors		241,278		▲0.36
INC gain from BJP		Swing	▲7.35	

=== Assembly Election 2018 ===
2018 Karnataka Legislative Assembly election : Davanagere North
Party	Candidate	Votes	%	±%
BJP	S. A. Ravindranath	76,540	48.65%	▲23.05
INC	S. S. Mallikarjun	72,469	46.06%	▼27.11
JD(S)	Ananda. M	5,381	3.42%	▲0.48
NOTA	None of the above	1,070	0.68%	New
Margin of victory		4,071	2.59%	▼44.98
Turnout		157,382	65.47%	▲0.65
Total valid votes		157,327		
Registered electors		240,405		▲15.58
BJP gain from INC		Swing	▼24.52	

=== Assembly Election 2013 ===
2013 Karnataka Legislative Assembly election : Davanagere North
Party	Candidate	Votes	%	±%
INC	S. S. Mallikarjun	88,101	73.17%	New
BJP	S. A. Ravindranath	30,821	25.60%	▼46.52
KJP	Jagadish. B. S	6,764	5.62%	New
JD(S)	T. Ganesha Dasakariyappa	3,537	2.94%	▼17.89
Independent	B. Gnana Prakash	1,131	0.94%	New
NCP	Mohammed Jabi	1,003	0.83%	New
Margin of victory		57,280	47.57%	▼3.72
Turnout		134,827	64.82%	▲8.78
Total valid votes		120,410		
Registered electors		208,005		▲10.70
INC gain from BJP		Swing	▲1.05	

=== Assembly Election 2008 ===
2008 Karnataka Legislative Assembly election : Davanagere North
Party	Candidate	Votes	%	±%
BJP	S. A. Ravindranath	75,798	72.12%	New
JD(S)	B. M. Satish	21,888	20.83%	New
LJP	Mohammadali. J	2,151	2.05%	New
BSP	B. Kotresh Kanchikere	1,277	1.22%	New
Independent	Subhan Khan	1,219	1.16%	New
Independent	K. Narayana	728	0.69%	New
Margin of victory		53,910	51.29%	
Turnout		105,293	56.04%	
Total valid votes		105,098		
Registered electors		187,905		
BJP win (new seat)				

== See also ==
- List of constituencies of the Karnataka Legislative Assembly
- Davanagere district
