= Davanagere Lok Sabha constituency =

Constituency of the Indian parliament in Karnataka

Coordinates: 14.45°N 75.91°E

Davanagere
- Lok Sabha constituency
- Davanagere Lok Sabha Constituency Map

Constituency details
- Country: India
- Region: South India
- State: Karnataka
- Assembly constituencies: Jagalur; Harapanahalli; Harihar; Davanagere North; Davanagere South; Mayakonda; Channagiri; Honnali
- Established: 1977
- Reservation: None

Member of Parliament
- 18th Lok Sabha
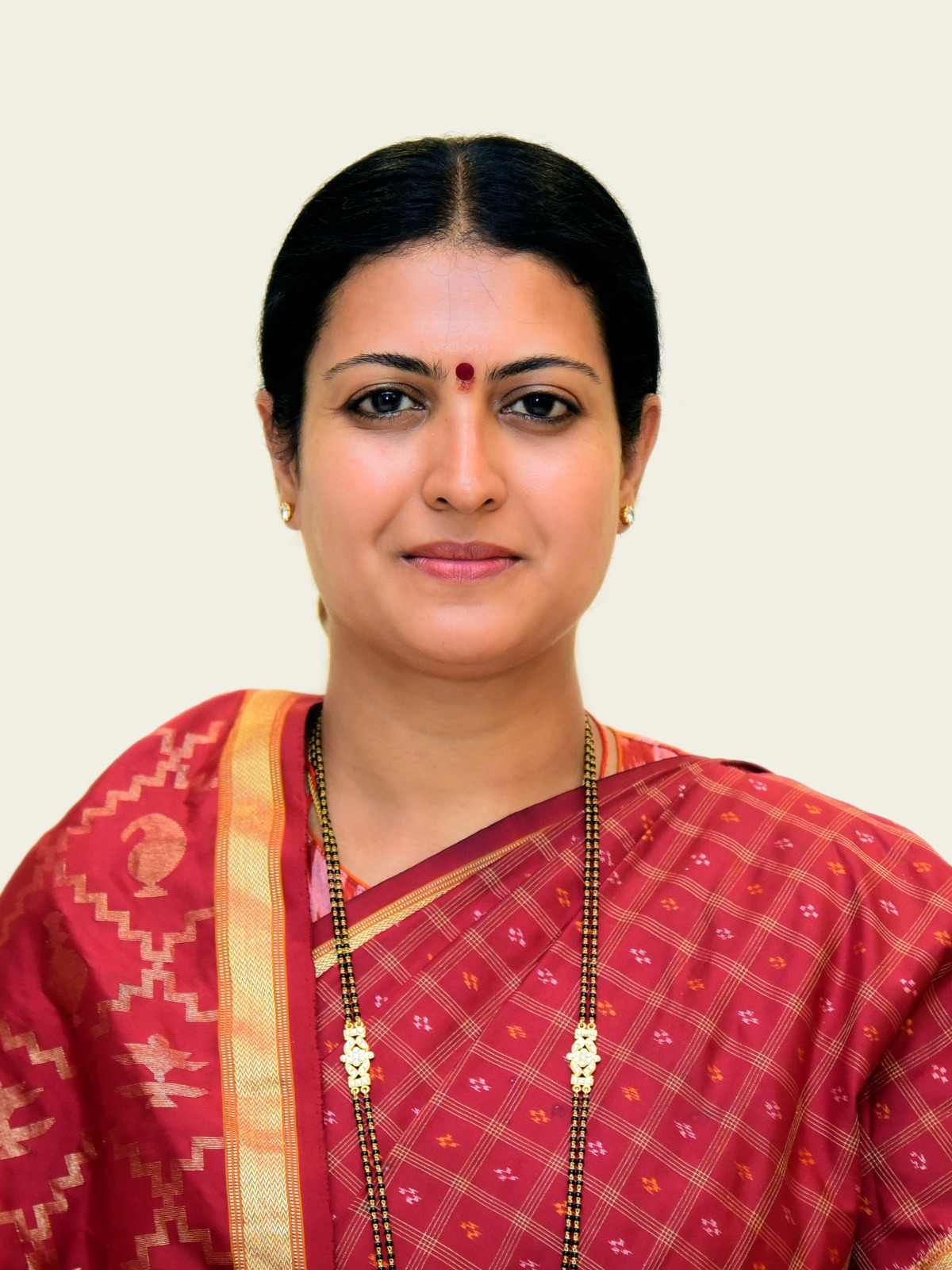
- Incumbent Prabha Mallikarjun
- Party: Indian National Congress
- Elected year: 2024

Davanagere Lok Sabha constituency is one of 28 Lok Sabha constituencies in Karnataka state in southern India. This constituency was created in 1977 after the reorganisation of Indian states.

== Assembly segments ==
Davanagere Lok Sabha constituency comprises the following eight legislative assembly segments:

No	Name	District	Member	Party	Party Leading (in 2024)
103	Jagalur (ST)	Davanagere and Vijayanagara	B. Devendrappa	INC	INC
104	Harapanahalli	Vijayanagara	Latha Mallikarjun	INC	BJP
105	Harihar	Davanagere	B. P. Harish	BJP	INC
106	Davanagere North	Davanagere	S. S. Mallikarjun	INC	BJP
107	Davanagere South	Davanagere	Samarth Shamanur Mallikarjun	INC	INC
108	Mayakonda (SC)	Davanagere	K. S. Basavanthappa	INC	INC
109	Channagiri	Davanagere	Basavaraju V. Shivaganga	INC	INC
110	Honnali	Davanagere	D. G. Shanthana Gowda	INC	INC

== Members of Parliament ==
Year	Member	Party
1971	Kondajji Basappa	Indian National Congress
1977	Kondajji Basappa	Indian National Congress
1980	T. V. Chandrashekharappa	Indian National Congress
1984	Channaiah Odeyar	Indian National Congress
1989	Channaiah Odeyar	Indian National Congress
1991	Channaiah Odeyar	Indian National Congress
1996	Gowdara Mallikarjunappa	Bharatiya Janata Party
1998	Shamanuru Shivashankarappa	Indian National Congress
1999	Gowdara Mallikarjunappa	Bharatiya Janata Party
2004	G. M. Siddeshwara	Bharatiya Janata Party
2009	G. M. Siddeshwara	Bharatiya Janata Party
2014	G. M. Siddeshwara	Bharatiya Janata Party
2019	G. M. Siddeshwara	Bharatiya Janata Party
2024	Prabha Mallikarjun	Indian National Congress

== Election results ==
=== General Election 2024 ===
2024 Indian general election: Davanagere
Party	Candidate	Votes	%	±%
INC	Prabha Mallikarjun	633,059	47.95	▲7.49
BJP	Gayatri Siddeshwara	6,06,965	45.97	▼8.69
Independent	G. B. Vinay Kumar	42,907	3.25	N/A
NOTA	None of the above	3,124	0.24	▼0.26
Majority		26,094	1.98	▼12.22
Turnout		13,21,228	77.27	▲4.08
INC gain from BJP		Swing		

=== 2019 ===
2019 Indian general elections: Davanagere
Party	Candidate	Votes	%	±%
BJP	G. M. Siddeshwara	652,996	54.66	▲8.12
INC	H.B. Manjappa	4,83,294	40.46	▼4.50
BSP	Siddappa B.H.	7,736	0.65	N/A
IND	Manjunatha Marikoppa	5,947	0.50	N/A
Margin of victory		1,69,702	14.20	▲12.62
Turnout		11,95,225	73.19	
BJP hold		Swing		

=== 2014 ===
2014 Indian general elections: Davanagere
Party	Candidate	Votes	%	±%
BJP	G. M. Siddeshwara	518,894	46.54	
INC	S. S. Mallikarjun	5,01,287	44.96	
JD(U)	Mahima Patel	46,911	4.21	
CPI	Com H. K. Ramachandrappa	8,064	0.72	
Margin of victory		17,607	1.58	
Turnout		11,15,132	73.23	
BJP hold		Swing		

=== 2009 ===
2009 Indian general election: Davanagere
Party	Candidate	Votes	%	±%
BJP	G. M. Siddeswara	423,447	46.67	
INC	S. S. Mallikarjuna	421,423	46.45	
JD(S)	K. B. Kallerudreshappa	10,489	1.16	
Independent	22 Independent Candidates	43,479	4.80	
Others	3 Other Party Candidates	8,439	0.93	
Majority		2,024	0.22	
Turnout				
Swing to BJP from INC		Swing		

=== 2004 ===
2004 Indian general election: Davanagere
Party	Candidate	Votes	%	±%
BJP	G. M. Siddeswara	370,499	40.70	
INC	S. S. Mallikarjun	337,823	37.11	
JD(S)	Channaiah Odeyar	158,515	17.41	
Independent	Dr. Sridhara Udupa	16,582	1.82	
Independent	R. Madappa	14,646	1.61	
Independent	T. M. Mallikarjuna Swamy	12,333	1.35	
Majority		32,676	3.59	
Turnout				
Swing to BJP from INC		Swing		

=== 1999 ===
1999 Indian general election: Davangere
Party	Candidate	Votes	%	±%
BJP	G. Mallikarjunappa	398,969	46.93	
INC	Shamanur Shivashankarappa	382,700	45.02	
JD(S)	K. Mallappa	64,705	7.61	
AIADMK	Basavaraj	3,704	0.44	
Majority		16,269	1.91	
Turnout		882,717	72.50	
Swing to BJP from INC		Swing		

=== 1998 ===
1998 Indian general election: Davangere
Party	Candidate	Votes	%	±%
INC	Shamanur Shiva Shankarappa	343,704	42.21	
BJP	G. Mallikarjunappa	332,372	40.82	
JD	S. H. Patel	99,334	12.20	
KTVP	S. Ningappa	32,731	4.02	
Independent	Yogishrao Shindhe	2,363	0.29	
Independent	Srinivasa	1,640	0.20	
Independent	Bhopala Naik	1,254	0.15	
Independent	S. Sharanappa	843	0.10	
Majority		11,332	1.39	
Turnout		828,009	70.06	
Swing to INC from BJP		Swing		

=== 1996 ===
1996 Indian general election: Davangere
Party	Candidate	Votes	%	±%
BJP	G. Mallikarjunappa	268,962	36.81	
JD	S. H. Patel	171,875	23.52	
INC	Channaiah Odeyar	161,296	22.08	
KCP	M. Basappa	107,369	14.69	
Independent	20 Independent Candidates	21,157	2.90	
Majority		97,087	13.29	
Turnout				
Swing to BJP from JD		Swing		

=== 1991 ===
1991 Indian general election: Davangere
Party	Candidate	Votes	%	±%
INC	Channaiah Odeyar	237,542	39.85	
BJP	S. A. Rabindranath	237,087	39.78	
JD	D. G. Basavanagowda	105,260	17.66	
Independent	10 Independent Candidates	12,111	2.03	
Others	1 Other Party Candidate	4,039	0.68	
Majority		455	0.07	
Turnout				
Swing to INC from BJP		Swing		

=== 1989 ===
1989 Indian general election: Davangere
Party	Candidate	Votes	%	±%
INC	Channaiah Odeyar	369,969	52.31	
JD	K. G. Maheswarappa	293,849	41.55	
JP	M. Gangadharaiah	35,909	5.08	
Independent	N. M. Chandrashekhara Swamy	5,015	0.71	
Independent	T. Shanmukhappa	2,548	0.36	
Majority		76,120	10.76	
Turnout		742,962	68.82	
Swing to INC from JD		Swing		

=== 1984 ===
1984 Indian general election: Davangere
Party	Candidate	Votes	%	±%
INC	Channaiah Odeyar	290,003	54.09	
JP	K. G. Maheswarappa	224,262	41.82	
CPI	M. Pampapathi	7,406	1.38	
Independent	8 Independent Candidates	14,525	2.71	
Majority		65,741	12.27	
Turnout		551,048	69.67	
Swing to INC from JP		Swing		

=== 1980 ===
1980 Indian general election: Davangere
Party	Candidate	Votes	%	±%
INC(I)	T. V. Chandrashekharappa	238,506	55.58	
JP	Kondajji Basappa	97,510	22.72	
INC(U)	Shamanur Shivashankarappa	86,167	20.08	
Independent	K. Beraiah Naik	2,816	0.66	
Independent	Ameer	2,197	0.51	
Independent	Y. M. Parameshwaraiah	1,949	0.45	
Majority		140,996	32.86	
Turnout		443,514	60.15	
Swing to INC(I) from JP		Swing		

=== 1977 ===
1977 Indian general election: Davangere
Party	Candidate	Votes	%	±%
INC	Kondajji Basappa	244,200	59.24	
JP	K. G. Maheswarappa	152,078	36.89	
CPI	Ghani Sab	15,965	3.87	
Majority		92,122	22.35	
Turnout		425,341	69.33	
Swing to INC from JP		Swing		

== See also ==
- Davanagere district
- List of constituencies of the Lok Sabha
