= Mayakonda Assembly constituency =

Legislative Assembly constituency in Karnataka State, India

Coordinates: 14.28°N 76.08°E

Mayakonda
- Constituency No. 108 for the Karnataka Legislative Assembly

Constituency details
- Country: India
- Region: South India
- State: Karnataka
- District: Davanagere
- Lok Sabha constituency: Davangere
- Established: 1976
- Total electors: 191,421
- Reservation: SC

Member of Legislative Assembly
- 16th Karnataka Legislative Assembly
- Incumbent K. S. Basavanthappa
- Party: Indian National Congress
- Elected year: 2023
- Preceded by: N. Liganna

Mayakonda Assembly constituency is one of the 224 Legislative Assembly constituencies of Karnataka in India.

It is part of Davanagere district and is reserved for candidates belonging to the Scheduled Castes.

K. S. Basavanthappa is the current MLA of Mayakonda Assembly constituency.

== Members of the Legislative Assembly ==
Election	Member	Party
1978	Nagamma. C. Keshavamurty	Indian National Congress
1983	K. G. Maheshwarappa	Janata Party
1985	Kannavara Mallappa	Janata Party
1989	Nagamma. C. Keshavamurty	Indian National Congress
1994	S. A. Ravindranath	Bharatiya Janata Party
1999	S. A. Ravindranath	Bharatiya Janata Party
2004	S. A. Ravindranath	Bharatiya Janata Party
2008	M. Basavaraja Naik	Bharatiya Janata Party
2013	K. Shivamurthy	Indian National Congress
2018	N. Linganna	Bharatiya Janata Party
2023	K. S. Basavanthappa	Indian National Congress

== Election results ==
=== Assembly Election 2023 ===
2023 Karnataka Legislative Assembly election : Mayakonda
Party	Candidate	Votes	%	±%
INC	K. S. Basavanthappa	70,916	43.83%	▲15.41
Independent	B. M. Pushpa Vageeshaswamy	37,614	23.25%	New
BJP	M. Basavaraja Naik	34,630	21.40%	▼11.18
JD(S)	Anandappa. H	12,915	7.98%	▲0.84
UPP	Chethan Kumar Naik. K	1,235	0.76%	New
NOTA	None of the above	718	0.44%	▼0.37
Margin of victory		33,302	20.58%	▲16.42
Turnout		162,493	84.89%	▲3.43
Total valid votes		161,790		
Registered electors		191,421		▲0.47
INC gain from BJP		Swing	▲11.25	

=== Assembly Election 2018 ===
2018 Karnataka Legislative Assembly election : Mayakonda
Party	Candidate	Votes	%	±%
BJP	N. Linganna	50,556	32.58%	▲20.26
INC	K. S. Basavaraj Basavanthappa	44,098	28.42%	▲5.80
Independent	Anandappa. H	27,321	17.61%	New
JD(U)	M. Basavaraja Naik	16,640	10.72%	▲10.01
JD(S)	Sheela Naik	11,085	7.14%	▼0.95
NOTA	None of the above	1,258	0.81%	New
Margin of victory		6,458	4.16%	▲3.68
Turnout		155,210	81.46%	▲4.20
Total valid votes		155,163		
Registered electors		190,528		▲8.92
BJP gain from INC		Swing	▲9.96	

=== Assembly Election 2013 ===
2013 Karnataka Legislative Assembly election : Mayakonda
Party	Candidate	Votes	%	±%
INC	K. Shivamurthy	32,435	22.62%	▼9.02
KJP	N. Linganna	31,741	22.14%	New
Independent	Anandappa. H	18,355	12.80%	New
BJP	M. Basavaraja Naik	17,658	12.32%	▼34.18
JD(S)	K. G. R. Naik	11,596	8.09%	▼3.78
Independent	Dr. Y. Ramappa	9,395	6.55%	New
BSRCP	N. Srinivasa Naik	3,333	2.32%	New
Independent	Dr. B. Chandranaik	2,160	1.51%	New
JD(U)	Kiran Kumar	1,023	0.71%	▼0.47
Margin of victory		694	0.48%	▼14.38
Turnout		135,144	77.26%	▲7.17
Total valid votes		143,385		
Registered electors		174,925		▲9.27
INC gain from BJP		Swing	▼23.88	

=== Assembly Election 2008 ===
2008 Karnataka Legislative Assembly election : Mayakonda
Party	Candidate	Votes	%	±%
BJP	M. Basavaraja Naik	52,128	46.50%	▼1.83
INC	Dr. Y. Ramappa	35,471	31.64%	▼9.63
JD(S)	A. H. Kotrappa	13,308	11.87%	▲5.74
BSP	Alur Ningaraj	3,004	2.68%	New
Swarna Yuga Party	Sreedhar. T	2,257	2.01%	New
Independent	N. Malleshappa	2,041	1.82%	New
JD(U)	H. Rajanaik	1,318	1.18%	New
Margin of victory		16,657	14.86%	▲7.80
Turnout		112,208	70.09%	▲2.93
Total valid votes		112,100		
Registered electors		160,082		▼16.65
BJP hold		Swing	▼1.83	

=== Assembly Election 2004 ===
2004 Karnataka Legislative Assembly election : Mayakonda
Party	Candidate	Votes	%	±%
BJP	S. A. Ravindranath	62,290	48.33%	▲6.54
INC	Shekharappa. R. S	53,193	41.27%	▲12.13
JD(S)	Shyagale G. Nagappa	7,906	6.13%	▲2.17
JP	Sheela. J. N	2,667	2.07%	New
Urs Samyuktha Paksha	Basavarajappa. K. B	1,482	1.15%	New
Independent	Eshwarappa. H	1,337	1.04%	New
Margin of victory		9,097	7.06%	▼5.58
Turnout		128,983	67.16%	▼3.28
Total valid votes		128,875		
Registered electors		192,066		▲12.86
BJP hold		Swing	▲6.54	

=== Assembly Election 1999 ===
1999 Karnataka Legislative Assembly election : Mayakonda
Party	Candidate	Votes	%	±%
BJP	S. A. Ravindranath	46,917	41.79%	▼7.22
INC	K. R. Jayadevappa	32,720	29.14%	▲6.31
Independent	N. B. Huchangappa	10,532	9.38%	New
Independent	N. G. Puttuswamy	8,900	7.93%	New
JD(S)	T. Basavaraj	4,446	3.96%	New
Independent	H. Nanjundappa	2,956	2.63%	New
Independent	Kengo Hanumanthappa	2,674	2.38%	New
CPI	H. K. Ramachandrappa	1,503	1.34%	New
Independent	B. R. Nalandappa	908	0.81%	New
Margin of victory		14,197	12.64%	▼13.55
Turnout		119,870	70.44%	▲4.07
Total valid votes		112,275		
Rejected ballots		7,403	6.18%	▲3.40
Registered electors		170,182		▲9.93
BJP hold		Swing	▼7.22	

=== Assembly Election 1994 ===
1994 Karnataka Legislative Assembly election : Mayakonda
Party	Candidate	Votes	%	±%
BJP	S. A. Ravindranath	48,955	49.01%	▲43.21
INC	Nagamma. C. Keshavamurty	22,799	22.83%	▼13.89
INC	H. Chandrappa	16,985	17.00%	New
JD	K. G. Susheelamma	6,085	6.09%	▼18.27
KRRS	T. M. Muniyappa	1,393	1.39%	New
Independent	H. S. Murthy	1,056	1.06%	New
JP	B. O. Raju	639	0.64%	New
Independent	Nageswara Rao	613	0.61%	New
Margin of victory		26,156	26.19%	▲13.83
Turnout		102,740	66.37%	▼1.59
Total valid votes		99,884		
Rejected ballots		2,856	2.78%	▼5.29
Registered electors		154,810		▲11.44
BJP gain from INC		Swing	▲12.29	

=== Assembly Election 1989 ===
1989 Karnataka Legislative Assembly election : Mayakonda
Party	Candidate	Votes	%	±%
INC	Nagamma. C. Keshavamurty	31,869	36.72%	▼8.05
JD	K. Mallappa Bin Mallappa	21,141	24.36%	New
JP	N. G. Puttuswamy	16,763	19.31%	New
CPI	H. K. Ramachandrappa	10,366	11.94%	New
BJP	Ravindranatha	5,030	5.80%	▲1.64
Margin of victory		10,728	12.36%	▲7.23
Turnout		94,411	67.96%	▼0.98
Total valid votes		86,795		
Rejected ballots		7,616	8.07%	▲6.39
Registered electors		138,923		▲26.53
INC gain from JP		Swing	▼13.18	

=== Assembly Election 1985 ===
1985 Karnataka Legislative Assembly election : Mayakonda
Party	Candidate	Votes	%	±%
JP	Kannavara Mallappa	37,137	49.90%	▼1.48
INC	K. R. Jayadevappa	33,319	44.77%	▲4.71
BJP	S. A. Ravindranath	3,094	4.16%	▼0.46
Margin of victory		3,818	5.13%	▼6.19
Turnout		75,687	68.94%	▲0.17
Total valid votes		74,416		
Rejected ballots		1,271	1.68%	▼1.08
Registered electors		109,794		▲17.46
JP hold		Swing	▼1.48	

=== Assembly Election 1983 ===
1983 Karnataka Legislative Assembly election : Mayakonda
Party	Candidate	Votes	%	±%
JP	K. G. Maheshwarappa	32,113	51.38%	▲13.86
INC	H. D. Maheshwarappa	25,036	40.06%	▲25.87
BJP	K. G. Hanumanthappa	2,887	4.62%	New
Independent	H. Revanappa	624	1.00%	New
IC(S)	N. Siddaramappa	610	0.98%	New
Independent	G. N. Virupakshappa	395	0.63%	New
Margin of victory		7,077	11.32%	▲1.80
Turnout		64,279	68.77%	▼3.78
Total valid votes		62,503		
Rejected ballots		1,776	2.76%	▼0.57
Registered electors		93,470		▲9.06
JP gain from INC(I)		Swing	▲4.34	

=== Assembly Election 1978 ===
1978 Karnataka Legislative Assembly election : Mayakonda
Party	Candidate	Votes	%	±%
INC(I)	Nagamma. C. Keshavamurty	28,277	47.04%	New
JP	K. G. Maheswarappa	22,556	37.52%	New
INC	M. Mudegowdappa	8,528	14.19%	New
Independent	Orkarappa	514	0.86%	New
Margin of victory		5,721	9.52%	
Turnout		62,182	72.55%	
Total valid votes		60,113		
Rejected ballots		2,069	3.33%	
Registered electors		85,707		
INC(I) win (new seat)				

== See also ==
- List of constituencies of the Karnataka Legislative Assembly
- Davanagere district
