= Kondajji =

- village
- Location in Karnataka, India Kondajji (India)
- Coordinates: 14.588°N 75.854°E
- Country: India
- State: Karnataka
- District: Davanagere district

Government
  - Type: Panchayat
  - Body: Gram panchayat
- Elevation: 530 m (1,740 ft)

Languages
  - Official: Kannada language
- Time zone: UTC+5:30 (IST)
- Telephone code: (91) 08192
- ISO 3166 code: IN-KA
- Vehicle registration: KA-17
- Taluka: Harihar
- Distance from Davangere: 13 kilometres (8.1 mi)
- Distance from Bangalore: 274 kilometres (170 mi)
- Website: karnataka.gov.in

Kondajji is a village in Harihar taluk, in the Davangere district, Karnataka. It is situated about 13 kilometres (8.1 mi) from the city of Davangere

Kondajji is well known as a picnic spot and it is one of the major scout and guide training center in South India. A lake runs through the centre of the village and the village is surrounded by minor hills. there is a Scouts guides Bhavan and you cannot is there a hero stone

Power generation using wind energy has also been implemented by the state government.
