= S. S. Mallikarjun =

Indian politician

Cabinet Minister Government of Karnataka
- Incumbent
- Assumed office 27 May 2023
- Governor: Thawarchand Gehlot
- Cabinet: Second Siddaramaiah ministry; Shivakumar ministry
- Chief Minister: Siddaramaiah; D. K. Shivakumar
- Ministry and Departments: Mines & Geology; Horticulture
- In office 2016–2018
- Governor: Vajubhai Vala
- Cabinet: First Siddaramaiah ministry
- Chief Minister: Siddaramaiah
- Ministry and Departments: Horticulture; Agricultural Marketing
- In office 11 October 1999 – 28 May 2004
- Governor: Khurshed Alam Khan; V. S. Ramadevi; T. N. Chaturvedi
- Cabinet: Krishna ministry
- Chief Minister: S. M. Krishna
- Ministry and Departments: Youth affairs; Sports

Member of Karnataka Legislative Assembly
- Incumbent
- Assumed office 13 May 2023
- Preceded by: S. A. Ravindranath
- Constituency: Davangere North
- In office 2013–2018
- Preceded by: S. A. Ravindranath
- Succeeded by: S. A. Ravindranath
- Constituency: Davangere North
- In office 1999–2004
- Preceded by: Shamanuru Shivashankarappa
- Succeeded by: Shamanuru Shivashankarappa
- Constituency: Davangere

Personal details
- Born: 22 September 1967 (age 59) Davangere, Mysore State, India
- Party: Indian National Congress
- Spouse: Prabha Mallikarjun
- Children: Two sons (Samarth Shamanur & Shiva Shamanur) and one daughter (Shreshta Shamanur)
- Parent: Shamanuru Shivashankarappa

Shamanur Shivashankarappa Mallikarjun (Kannada:ಶಾಮನೂರು ಶಿವಶಂಕರಪ್ಪ ಮಲ್ಲಿಕಾರ್ಜುನ್), known professionally as S.S. Mallikarjun, is an Indian politician from Karnataka. He is currently serving as Minister of Mines & Geology and Horticulture in Government of Karnataka. He is a member of Karnataka Legislative Assembly representing Davangere North.

He is the Chairman of SS Institute of Medical Science and research center, Davangere. He lost to G. M. Siddeshwara in 2014 Lok Sabha elections. He also lost to S. A. Ravindranath in Karnataka State Assembly Elections-2018.

== Electoral History ==
=== Lok Sabha ===
Year	Constituency	Party	Votes	%	Opponent	Party	Votes	%	Result	Margin	%
2014	Davanagere	INC	5,01,287	44.95	G. M. Siddeshwara	BJP	5,18,894	46.53	Lost	-17,607	-1.58
2009	Davanagere	INC	4,21,423	46.45	G. M. Siddeshwara	BJP	4,23,447	46.67	Lost	-2,024	-0.22
2004	Davanagere	INC	3,37,823	37.11	G. M. Siddeswara	BJP	3,70,499	40.70	Lost	-32,676	-3.59
