= G. M. Siddeshwara =

Indian politician

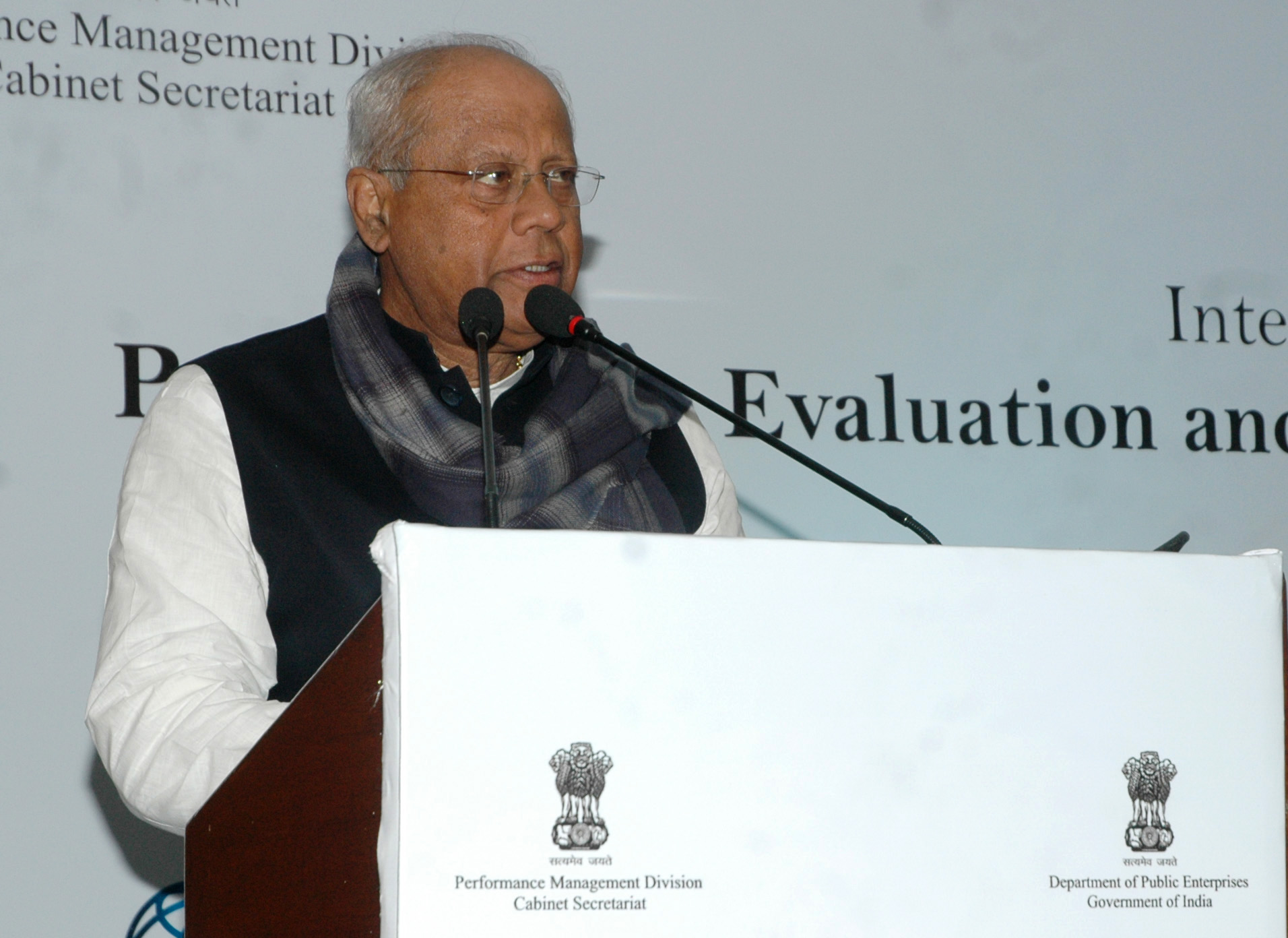

Minister of State for Heavy Industries and Public Enterprises
- In office 9 November 2014 – 12 July 2016
- Prime Minister: Narendra Modi
- Preceded by: Pon Radhakrishnan
- Succeeded by: Babul Supriyo

Minister of State for Civil Aviation
- In office 26 May 2014 – 9 November 2014
- Preceded by: K. C. Venugopal
- Succeeded by: Mahesh Sharma

Member of Parliament, Lok Sabha
- In office 13 May 2004 – 4 June 2024
- Preceded by: Gowdara Mallikarjunappa
- Succeeded by: Prabha Mallikarjun
- Constituency: Davangere

Personal details
- Born: 5 July 1952 (age 73) Chitradurga, Mysore State (now Karnataka), India
- Party: Bharatiya Janata Party
- Spouse: G. S. Gayithri
- Children: 2
- Website: Official Website
- As of 14 February, 2009 Source: Member of 14th Lok Sabha

Gowdara Mallikarjunappa Siddeshwara (born 5 July 1952) is an Indian politician. He was a former member of the Lok Sabha, the lower House of the Indian Parliament, representing Davangere of Karnataka since 2004. Siddeshwara served as the Union Minister of State for Heavy Industries and Public Enterprises and prior to that, as Minister of State for Civil Aviation, till he resigned from the Ministry after a few days of cabinet reshuffle in July 2016.

== Personal life ==
Siddeshwara was born on 5 July 1952. His father G. Mallikarjunappa (died 2003) was also a Member of Parliament for two terms: 1996–1998 and 1999–2002. Mallikarjunappa was affiliated to the RSS before joining the BJP electoral politics.

== Political career ==
Being an active member of the Bharatiya Janata Party, he served as the vice-president of the Karnataka State (2009–2010) and the National Parliamentary Party Treasurer of the Bharatiya Janata Party from 2004 to 2014. Hitherto, he served as the Secretary of Karnataka state BJP; Member of Parliamentary Consultative Committee for Ministry of Human Resource Development and Member of the Parliamentary Committee on Finance (2004 to 2009), Member of Parliamentary Committee on Water Resources (2009–2010); Member of Parliamentary Committee on Finance; and Member of Parliamentary Consultative Committee for the Ministry of Commerce & Industry (March 2010 - May 2014). He was re-elected to the 16th Lok Sabha from Davangere for the third time successively with a margin of 17, 607 votes defeating his Congress rival.

He served as Minister of State for Civil Aviation from 26 May 2014 to 9 November 2015 and Minister of State for Heavy Industries and Public Enterprises from 9 November 2014 to 12 July 2016.
