= Harihar =

Harihara
- City
- Location in Karnataka, India
- Coordinates: 14.507°N 75.8°E
- Country: India
- State: Karnataka
- District: Davanagere

Government
  - Body: City Municipal Council

Area
  - City: 15 km^{2} (5.8 sq mi)
  - Rural: 470 km^{2} (180 sq mi)
  - Metro: 9 km^{2} (3.5 sq mi)
- Elevation: 539 m (1,768 ft)

Population (2011)
  - City: 83,219
  - Density: 5,500/km^{2} (14,000/sq mi)
  - Rural: 163,668
  - Metro: 7,283

Languages
  - Official: Kannada
- Time zone: UTC+5:30 (IST)
- PIN: 577 601
- Telephone code: (91) 08192
- Vehicle registration: KA-17
- Distance from Davangere: 14 kilometres (8.7 mi)
- Website: http://www.hariharcity.mrc.gov.in

Harihara ([harihəra] also called Harihar) is a city, taluka in Davanagere District in the Indian state of Karnataka. It is the administrative headquarters of the Harihara Taluk. Harihara is famous for Harihareshwara Temple.

Harihara is situated on the banks of the Tungabhadra River, 275 kilometres North of Bengaluru. Harihar and Davangere (14 km away) are referred as "twin cities". Harihar is connected by road and railway, and is located on National Highway 48 (Mumbai – Bengaluru). It has a very pleasant climate year round. The major lifeline of this city is the Tungabhadra River, which is being exploited and polluted as a result of heavy industrialization.

== Etymology ==
Harihara (or Hari-hara) is a syncretic deity in Hinduism, combining the two major gods Vishnu (Hari) and Shiva (Hara). The region of Harihara had been under the control of the Hoysalas from the 11th to 13th centuries AD.

There is a famous temple built in the 12th century during Hoysala's time called Harihareshwara temple.

=== Legend ===
The god Harihareshwara is a combination of the gods Shiva and Vishnu. There is a story behind the avatar of this god. In ancient days this place was known as "Guharanya", a dense jungle and habitat of a demon Guhasura. He had a gift that no human or Rakshasa or god can kill him. And he started harassing people around this place. Then Vishnu and Shiva came together in a new avatara called Hari – Hara (Harihara) – and killed demon Guhasura.

== Industry ==
Harihar serves as a major industrial base also. It was served by the Kirloskar industry and at present Aditya Birla Group's Grasim Industries, Synthite, Shamanur Sugar's, Cargill and more. Kirloskar Engineering company has closed down in 2001, resulting in a loss of nearly 15,000 jobs.

== Attractions ==
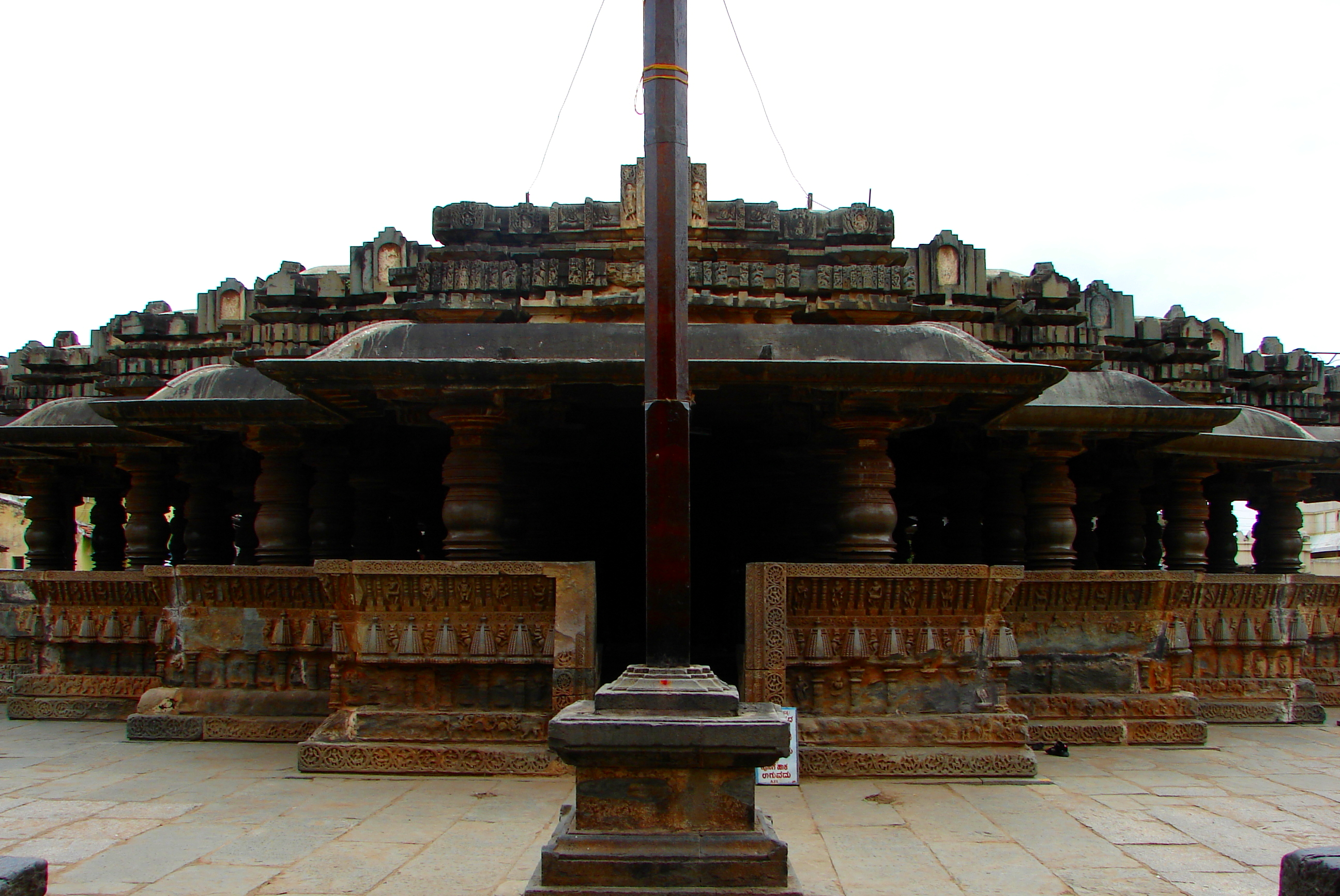
Harihareshwara Temple at Harihar

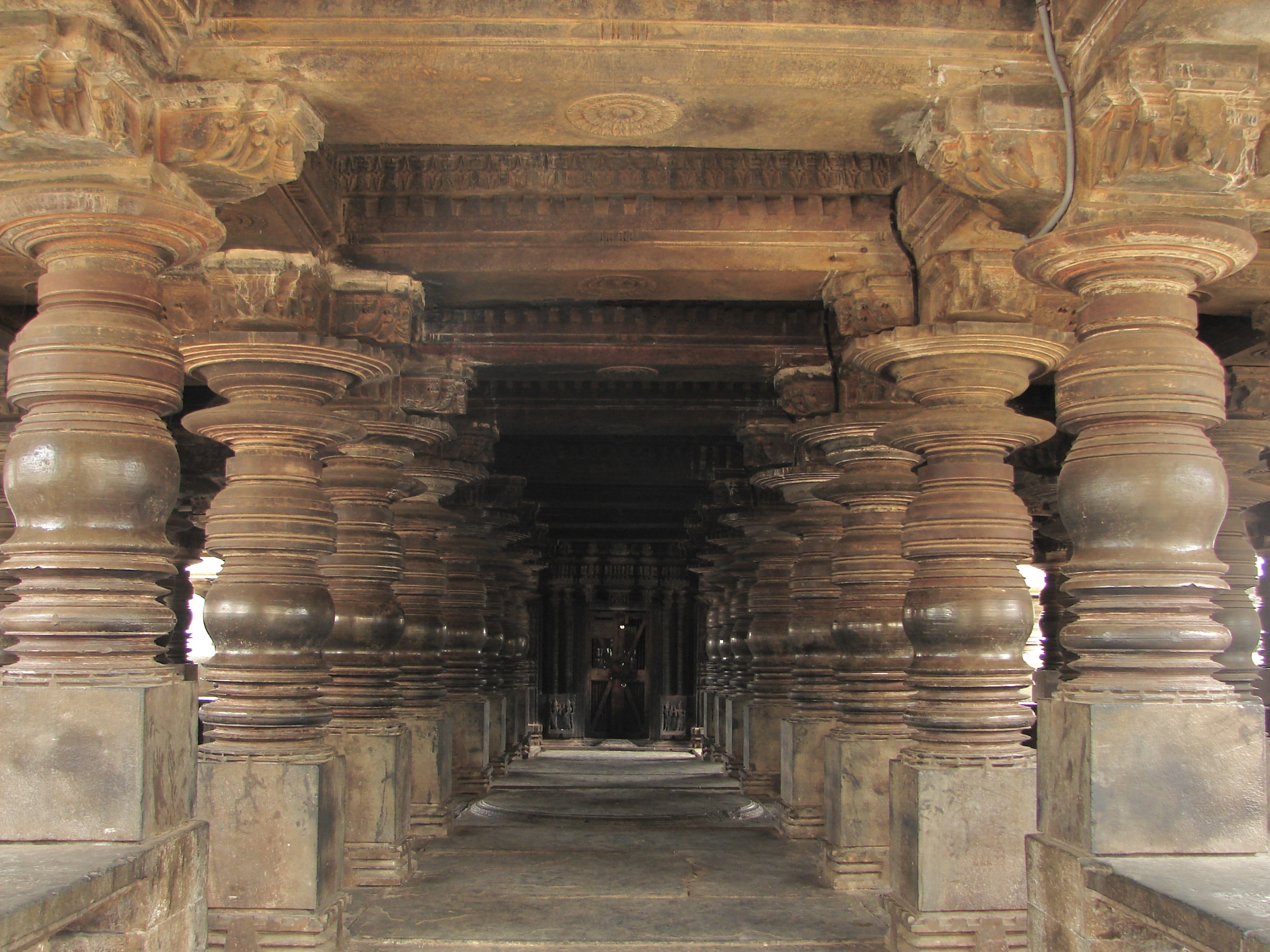
Harihareshwara Temple mandapa at Harihara

Harihar is popular for temples.

- Harihareshwara Temple
- Kondajji situated a few kilometers from Harihar is a picnic spot.
- Ranibennur Blackbuck Sanctuary around 20 km
- Omkar Math
- Banashankari Temple on the Banks of Tungabhadra.
- Kanyaka Parameshwari Temple in Temple Street.
- Raghavendra Swamy temple (popularly known as Raayara Matha)
- Ayyappa Temple other side of the river.
- Rajanahalli Hanumappa temple (Hanuman Temple in Rajanahalli, around 6 km from Harihar on bypass highway)
- Maargadha Durgamma temple (towards Ranibennur on NH4, around 3 km)
- Kumaranahalli Sri Ranganatha temple and Sri Ranganatha Ashram
- Mother Mary's Church
- Hazarat Chaman Shah Wali Dargha at Bathi Sharief, 6 km towards Davangere
- Hazarat Naadband Shah wali baba Dargha
- Hazarat Ahmed Shah Wali Mahmood Shah Wali Dargha.
- Narayana Aashrama 6 km towards Harapanahalli road. It is believed that original Rama Pariwara idols of Ayodhya were secretly established here.
- Satya Ganapati Temple 3 km towards Harapanahalli road.
- Kirloskar Institute of Advanced Management Studies, Yantranagar

== Geography ==
Harihara is located at 14.52°N 75.8°E. It has an average elevation of 540 metres (1771 feet).

== Demographics ==
Historical population
Year	Pop.	±%
1971	33,888	—
1981	52,334	+54.4%
1991	66,647	+27.3%
2001	75,042	+12.6%
2011	77,447	+3.2%

As of 2011 India census, Harihar had a population of 85,000. Males constitute 51% of the population and females 49%. In Harihar, 11% of the population is under 6 years of age. Kannada is the official and most spoken language.

== Connectivity ==
Situated exactly in the middle of Karnataka, Harihar has a good connectivity with the South and North of Karnataka.

=== Air ===
The nearest airport is at shivamogga around 80 km from Harihar. From there one can reach Bengaluru and Mumbai. The nearest International airports are 272 km and 275 km away in Mangaluru and Bengaluru respectively, from where one can take flights to most of the important cities in India. Harihar also has a private airport owned by Aditya Birla Group on their grounds and often used by politicians and famous personalities.

=== Railway ===
Harihara is well connected with most of the major cities like New Delhi, Mumbai, Bangalore and Chennai through regular trains. Harihar Railway Station, in central Harihar and at Amaravati Colony Junction. These stations connect Harihara to Bangalore and Pune and to Hospet and Bellary via Harapanahalli and Kottur.

=== Road ===
Major highways passing through Harihara are National Highway-48 (Bangalore - Mumbai) stretch, State Highway-25 and SH-76.

It is a 3-hour drive from Hubballi (131 km) and 6-hour-drive from Mangaluru (272 km) and Bengaluru (278 km). Almost all the buses which run from/to North Karnataka to/from South Karnataka go via Harihar. The town is 14 km from Davanagere city, which was earlier a part of the Chitradurga district (78 km).
