= 14th Karnataka Assembly =

Legislature

The 14th Karnataka Legislative Assembly was constituted after the Karnataka Legislative Assembly elections in 2013. 224 constituencies went to the polls on May 5; the votes were counted on May 8; and the results were announced on May 11.

== Members ==
Source.

Results
Assembly Constituency		Winner			Runner Up			Margin	Bio Ref	Remarks
#	Name	Candidate	Party	Votes	Candidate	Party	Votes	Margin	Bio Ref	Remarks
Belgaum District
1	Nippani	Shashikala Annasaheb Jolle	BJP	81860	Kakaso Pandurang Patil	INC	63198	18662		
2	Chikkodi-Sadalga	Prakash Hukkeri	INC	102237	Basavanni Sangappagol	BJP	25649	76588		
2	Chikkodi-Sadalga	Ganesh Hukkeri	INC							
3	Athani	Laxman Savadi	BJP	74299	Mahesh Kumathalli	INC	50528	23771		
4	Kagwad	Bharamgouda Alagouda Kage	BJP	41784	Shrimant Patil	JDS	38897	2887		
5	Kudachi	P. Rajeev	BSRC	71057	Ghatage Shama Bhima	INC	24823	46234		
6	Raybag	Duryodhan Mahalingappa Aihole	BJP	37535	Pradeep Ramu Malagi	Ind	36706	829		
7	Hukkeri	Umesh Katti	BJP	81810	Ravi Basavaraj Karale	INC	24484	57326		
8	Arabhavi	Balachandra Jarkiholi	BJP	99283	Utagi Ramappa Kareppa	INC	24062	75221		
9	Gokak	Ramesh Jarkiholi	INC	79175	Ashok Ningayya Pujari	JDS	51170	28005		
10	Yemkanmardi	Satish Jarkiholi	INC	70726	Astagi Maruti Mallappa	BJP	46376	24350		
11	Belagum Uttar	Fairoz Nuruddin Saith	INC	45125	Renu Suhas Killekar	Ind	26915	18210		
12	Belagum Dakshin	Sambhaji Patil	Ind	54426	Abhay Patil	BJP	48116	6310		
13	Belagum Rural	Sanjay Patil	BJP	38322	Kinekar Manohar Kallappa	Ind	36987	1335		
14	Khanapur	Arvind Chandrakant Patil	Ind	37055	Rafique Khatalsab Khanapuri	INC	20903	16152		
15	Kittur	Inamdar Danappagouda Basanagouda	INC	53924	Marihal Suresh Shivarudrappa	BJP	35634	18290		
16	Bailhongal	Vishwanath Patil	KJP	40709	Jagdish Metgud	BJP	37088	3621		
17	Saundatti Yellamma	Vishwanath Mamani	BJP	46434	Ravindra Bhupalappa Yaligar	INC	30392	16042		
18	Ramdurg	Ashok Pattan	INC	42310	Mahadevappa Shivalingappa Yadawad	BJP	37326	4984		
Bagalkote district
19	Mudhol	Govind Karjol	BJP	64727	Ramappa Timmapur	INC	59549	5178		
20	Terdal	Umashree	INC	70189	Siddu Savadi	BJP	67590	2599		
21	Jamkhandi	Siddu Nyamagouda	INC	49145	Jagadish Gudagunti	Ind	27993	21152		
22	Bilgi	J. T. Patil	INC	66655	Murugesh Nirani	BJP	55417	11238		
23	Badami	B B Chimmanakatti	INC	57446	Mahantesh Gurupadappa Mamadapur	JDS	42333	15113		
24	Bagalkot	Hullappa Yamanappa Meti	INC	68216	Veerabhadrayya Charantimath	BJP	65316	2900		
25	Hungund	Vijayanand Kashappanavar	INC	72720	Doddanagowda Patil	BJP	56923	15797		
Vijayapura district
26	Muddebihal	C. S. Nadagouda	INC	34747	Vimalabai Jagadevrao Deshmukh	KJP	22545	12202		
27	Devar Hippargi	A. S. Patil	INC	36231	Somanagouda. B. Patil	BJP	28135	8096		
28	Basavana Bagevadi	Shivanand Patil	INC	56329	Bellubbi Sangappa Kallappa	BJP	36653	19676		
29	Babaleshwar	M. B. Patil	INC	62061	Vijugouda Patil	JDS	57706	4355		
30	Bijapur City	Makbul S Bagawan	INC	48615	Basangouda Patil Yatnal	JDS	39235	9380		
31	Nagathan	Raju Alagur	INC	45570	Devanand Phulsing Chavan	JDS	44903	667		
32	Indi	Y. V. Patil	INC	58562	Ravikant Shankreppa Patil	KJP	25260	33302		
33	Sindagi	Ramesh Bhusanur	BJP	37834	Mallappa Managuli	JDS	37082	752		
Kalaburagi district
34	Afzalpur	Malikayya Guttedar	INC	38093	M. Y. Patil	KJP	32855	5238		
35	Jevargi	Ajay Singh	INC	67038	Doddappagouda S. Patil Naribola	BJP	30338	36700		
Yadgir district
36	Shorapur	Raja Venkatappa Nayak	INC	65033	Narasimha Nayak	BJP	60958	4075		
37	Shahapur	Guru Patil Sirwal	KJP	54924	Sharanabasappa Darshanapur	INC	49128	5796		
38	Yadgir	A.B Maalakareddy	INC	40434	Veera Baswanth Reddy Mudnal	BJP	31330	9104		
39	Gurmitkal	Baburao Chinchansur	INC	36051	Naganagowda Kandukar	JDS	34401	1650		
Kalaburagi district
40	Chittapur	Priyank M. Kharge	INC	69379	Valmiki Nayak	BJP	38188	31191		
41	Sedam	Sharan Prakash Patil	INC	53546	Rajkumar Patil	BJP	41651	11895		
42	Chincholi	Umesh. G. Jadhav	INC	58599	Sunil Vallyapure	KJP	32539	26060		
43	Gulbarga Rural	G. Ram Krishana	INC	40075	Revu Naik Belamgi	BJP	32866	7209		
44	Gulbarga Dakshin	Dattatraya Patil Revoor	BJP	36850	Shashil G. Namoshi	JDS	26880	9970		
45	Gulbarga Uttar	Qamar ul Islam	INC	50498	Nasir Hussain Ustad	KJP	30377	20121		
46	Aland	B. R. Patil	KJP	67085	Subhash Guttedar	JDS	49971	17114		
Bidar district
47	Basavakalyan	Mallikarjun Khuba	BJP	37494	B. Narayan Rao	INC	21601	15893		
48	Homnabad	Rajashekar Basavaraj Patil	INC	64694	M. Naseenoddin Patel	JDS	40194	24500		
49	Bidar South	Ashok Kheny	Karnataka Makkala Paksha	47763	Bandeppa Kashempur	JDS	31975	15788		
50	Bidar	Gurupadappa Nagamarapalli	KJP	50718	Rahim Khan	INC	48147	2571		
50	Bidar	Rahim Khan	INC							
51	Bhalki	Eshwara Khandre	INC	58012	D. K. Sidram	KJP	48343	9669		
52	Aurad	Prabhu Chauhan	BJP	61826	Dhanaji Bheema Jadhav	KJP	38635	23191		
Raichur district
53	Raichur Rural	Thipparaju	BJP	50497	Raja Rayappa Naik	INC	47227	3270		
54	Raichur	Shivaraj Patil	JDS	45263	Syed Yasin	INC	37392	7871		
55	Manvi	G. Hampayya Nayak	INC	50619	Raja Venkatappa Nayak	JDS	43632	6987		
56	Devadurga	Venkatesh Nayak	INC	62070	K Shivana Gouda Naik	BJP	58370	3700		
56	Devadurga	K. Shivanagouda Naik	BJP							
57	Lingsugur	Manappa Vajjal	JDS	31737	D. S. Hoolageri	INC	30451	1286		
58	Sindhanur	Badarli Hampanagouda	INC	49213	K. Kariyappa	BSRC	36197	13016		
59	Maski	Pratap Gowda Patil	INC	45552	Mahadevappa Gowda	KJP	26405	19147		
Koppal district
60	Kushtagi	Doddanagouda Hanamagouda Patil	BJP	44007	Amaregouda Linganagouda Patil Bayyapur	INC	40970	3037		
61	Kanakagiri	Shivaraj Tangadagi	INC	49451	Basavaraj Dadesugur	KJP	44399	5052		
62	Gangawati	Iqbal Ansari	JDS	60303	Paranna Munavalli	BJP	30514	29789		
63	Yelburga	Basavaraj Rayareddy	INC	52388	Halappa Achar	BJP	35488	16900		
64	Koppal	K. Raghavendra Hitnal	INC	81062	Karadi Sanganna Amarappa	BJP	54274	26788		
Gadag district
65	Shirahatti	Doddamani Ramakrishna Shiddlingappa	INC	44738	Ramappa Sobeppa Lamani	BJP	44423	315		
66	Gadag	H. K. Patil	INC	70475	Anil P. Menasinakai	BSRC	36748	33727		
67	Ron	Gurupadagouda Sanganagouda Patil	INC	74593	Kalakappa Bandi	BJP	56366	18227		
68	Nargund	B. R. Yavagal	INC	59620	C. C. Patil	BJP	51035	8585		
Dharwad district
69	Navalgund	N. H. Konaraddi	JDS	44448	Shankar Patil Munenkoppa	BJP	41779	2669		
70	Kundgol	C. S. Shivalli	INC	52690	Chikkangoudra Siddangouda Ishwaragouda	KJP	31618	21072		
71	Dharwad	Vinay Kulkarni	INC	53453	Amrut Desai	JDS	35133	18320		
72	Hubli-Dharwad-East	Abbayya Prasad	INC	42353	Veerabhadrappa Halaharavi	BJP	28831	13522		
73	Hubli-Dharwad-Central	Jagadish Shettar	BJP	58201	Mahesh Nalwad	INC	40447	17754		
74	Hubli-Dharwad-West	Aravind Bellad	BJP	42003	S. R. Morey	INC	30821	11182		
75	Kalghatgi	Santosh Lad	INC	76802	Channappa Mallappa Nimbannavar	KJP	31141	45661		
Uttara Kannada
76	Haliyal	R. V. Deshpande	INC	55005	Sunil V Hegde	JDS	49066	5939		
77	Karwar	Satish Krishna Sail	Ind	80727	Anand Asnotikar	BJP	44847	35880		
78	Kumta	Sharada Mohan Shetty	INC	36756	Dinakar Keshav Shetty	JDS	36336	420		
79	Bhatkal	M. S. Vaidya	Ind	37319	Enayathullah Shabandri	JDS	27435	9884		
80	Sirsi	Vishweshwar Hegde Kageri	BJP	42854	Deepak Honnavar	INC	39795	3059		
81	Yellapur	Arbail Shivaram Hebbar	INC	58025	V S Patil	BJP	33533	24492		
Haveri district
82	Hangal	Manohar Tahsildar	INC	66324	C. M Udasi	KJP	60638	5686		
83	Shiggaon	Basavaraj Bommai	BJP	73007	Sayed Azeempeer Khadri	INC	63504	9503		
84	Haveri (SC)	Rudrappa Lamani	INC	83119	Neharu Olekara	KJP	52911	30208		
85	Byadgi	Basavaraj Neelappa Shivannanavar	INC	57707	Shivaraj Sajjanar	KJP	44348	13359		
86	Hirekerur	U. B. Banakar	KJP	52623	B. C. Patil	INC	50017	2606		
87	Ranibennur	K. B. Koliwad	INC	53780	R. Shankar	Ind	46992	6788		
Bellary district
88	Hoovina Hadagali	P. T. Parameshwar Naik	INC	59336	B. Chandra Naik	BJP	18526	40810		
89	Hagaribommanahalli	Bheema Naik L.B.P	JDS	51972	K. Nemaraj Naik	BJP	51847	125		
90	Vijayanagara	Anand Singh	BJP	69995	H. Abdul Wahab	INC	39358	30637		
91	Kampli	T. H. Suresh Babu	BSRC	70858	J. N. Ganesh	Ind	39052	31806		
92	Siruguppa	B. M. Nagaraj	INC	65490	M. S. Somalingappa	BJP	43676	21814		
93	Bellary Rural	B. Sriramulu	BSRC	74854	Asundi Vannurappa	INC	41560	33294		
93	Bellary Rural	N. Y. Gopalakrishna	INC							
94	Bellary City	Anil Lad	INC	52098	S. Murali Krishna	BSRC	33898	18200		
95	Sandur	E. Tukaram	INC	62246	Dhananjaya. R	JDS	27615	34631		
96	Kudligi	B. Nagendra	Ind	71477	S. Venkatesh	INC	46674	24803		
Chitradurga district
97	Molakalmuru	S Thippeswamy	BSRC	76827	N. Y. Gopalakrishna	INC	69658	7169		
98	Challakere	T Raghumurthy	INC	60197	K T Kumaraswamy	KJP	37074	23123		
99	Chitradurga	G. H. Thippareddy	BJP	62228	Basavarajan	JDS	35510	26718		
100	Hiriyur	D. Sudhakar	INC	71661	A. Krishnappa	BJP	70456	1205		
101	Hosadurga	B. G. Govindappa	INC	58010	Gulihatti D. Shekar	Ind	37993	20017		
102	Holalkere	H. Anjaneya	INC	76856	M. Chandrappa	KJP	63992	12864		
Davanagere district
103	Jagalur	H. P. Rajesh	INC	77805	S. V. Ramachandra	KJP	40915	36890		
104	Harapanahalli	M.P.Ravindra	INC	56954	G. Karunakara Reddy	BJP	48548	8406		
105	Harihar	H. S. Shivashankar	JDS	59666	S. Ramappa	INC	40613	19053		
106	Davanagere North	S. S. Mallikarjun	INC	88101	S. A. Ravindranath	BJP	30821	57280		
107	Davanagere South	Shamanuru Shivashankarappa	INC	66320	Karekatte Syed Saifulla	JDS	26162	40158		
108	Mayakonda	K. Shivamurthy	INC	32435	N. Linganna	KJP	31741	694		
109	Channagiri	Vadnal Rajanna	INC	53355	K. Madal Virupakshappa	KJP	51582	1773		
110	Honnali	D. G Shantana Gowda	INC	78789	M. P. Renukacharya	KJP	60051	18738		
Shimoga district
111	Shimoga Rural	Sharada Pooryanaik	JDS	48639	G. Basavannappa	KJP	38530	10109		
112	Bhadravati	Appaji M. J.	JDS	78370	B.K. Sangameshwara	Ind	34271	44099		
113	Shimoga	K. B. Prasanna Kumar	INC	39355	S. Rudregowda	KJP	39077	278		
114	Tirthahalli	Kimmane Rathnakar	INC	37160	R.M. Manjunatha Gowda	KJP	35817	1343		
115	Shikaripura	B. S. Yeddyurappa	KJP	69126	H. S. Shanthaveerappa Gowda	INC	44701	24425		
115	Shikaripura	B. Y. Raghavendra	BJP							
116	Soraba	Madhu Bangarappa	JDS	58541	Hartalu Halappa	KJP	37316	21225		
117	Sagar	Kagodu Thimmappa	INC	71960	B. R. Jayanth	KJP	30712	41248		
Udupi district
118	Baindur	K Gopala Poojary	INC	82277	B. M. Sukumar Shetty	BJP	51128	31149		
119	Kundapura	Halady Srinivas Shetty	Ind	80563	Mallyadi Shivarama Shetty	INC	39952	40611		
120	Udupi	Pramod Madhwaraj	INC	86868	B. Sudhakar Shetty	BJP	47344	39524		
121	Kapu	Vinay Kumar Sorake	INC	52782	Lalaji Mendon	BJP	50927	1855		
122	Karkala	V. Sunil Kumar	BJP	65039	H. Gopal Bhandary	INC	60785	4254		
Chikmagalur district
123	Sringeri	D.N Jeevaraj	BJP	58402	T. D. Raje Gowda	INC	54950	3452		
124	Mudigere	B. B. Ningaiah	JDS	32417	B. N. Chandrappa	INC	31782	635		
125	Chikmagalur	C. T. Ravi	BJP	58683	K S Shanthe Gowda	INC	47695	10988		
126	Tarikere	G. H Srinivasa	INC	35817	D. S. Suresh	KJP	34918	899		
127	Kadur	Y. S. V. Datta	JDS	68733	Belli Prakash	KJP	26300	42433		
Tumakuru district
128	Chiknayakanhalli	C. B. Suresh Babu	JDS	60759	J. C. Madhu Swamy	KJP	49620	11139		
129	Tiptur	K. Shadakshari	INC	56817	B. C. Nagesh	BJP	45215	11602		
130	Turuvekere	M. T. Krishnappa	JDS	66089	Masala Jayaram	KJP	57164	8925		
131	Kunigal	D. Nagarajaiah	JDS	44575	D. Krishna Kumar	BJP	34943	9632		
132	Tumkur City	Rafiq Ahmed	INC	43681	G. B. Jyothi Ganesh	KJP	40073	3608		
133	Tumkur Rural	B. Suresh Gowda	BJP	55029	D.C. Gowrishankar	JDS	53457	1572		
134	Koratagere	P. R. Sudhakara Lal	JDS	72229	G. Parameshwara	INC	54074	18155		
135	Gubbi	S. R. Srinivas	JDS	58783	G. N. Bettaswamy	KJP	51539	7244		
136	Sira	T. B. Jayachandra	INC	74089	B. Sathyanarayana	JDS	59408	14681		
137	Pavagada	K.M. Thimmarayappa	JDS	68686	H. V. Venkatesh	INC	63823	4863		
138	Madhugiri	Kyatasandra N. Rajanna	INC	75086	M. V. Veerabhadraiah	JDS	60659	14427		
Chikkaballapura district
139	Gauribidanur	N. H. Shivashankara Reddy	INC	50131	K Jaipala Reddy	Ind	44056	6075		
140	Bagepalli	S.N.Subbareddy	Ind	66227	G.V. Sreeramareddy	CPI(M)	35472	30755		
141	Chikkaballapur	K. Sudhakar	INC	74914	K P Bachche Gowda	JDS	59866	15048		
142	Sidlaghatta	M Rajanna	JDS	77931	V Muniyappa	INC	62452	15479		
143	Chintamani	J. K. Krishnareddy	JDS	68950	M C Sudhakar	Ind	67254	1696		
Kolar district
144	Srinivasapur	K. R. Ramesh Kumar	INC	83426	G. K. Venkata Shiva Reddy	JDS	79533	3893		
145	Mulbagal	G. Manjunatha	Ind	73146	N. Munianjanappa	JDS	39412	33734		
146	Kolar Gold Field	Y. Ramakka	BJP	55014	M. Backthavachalam	JDS	28992	26022		
147	Bangarapet	S. N. Narayanaswamy. K. M	INC	71570	M. Narayana Swamy	BJP	43193	28377		
148	Kolar	Varthur Prakash	Ind	62957	K. Srinivasa Gowda	JDS	50366	12591		
149	Malur	K.S.Manjunath Gowda	JDS	57645	ES EN Krishnaiah shetty	Ind	38876	18769		
Bangalore Urban district
150	Yelahanka	S. R. Vishwanath	BJP	75507	B. Chandrappa	INC	57110	18397		
151	K. R. Pura	Byrati Basavaraj	INC	106299	N. S. Nandiesha Reddy	BJP	82298	24001		
152	Byatarayanapura	Krishna Byre Gowda	INC	96125	A Ravi	BJP	63725	32400		
153	Yeshwanthpur	S. T. Somashekhar	INC	120380	T. N. Javarayi Gowda	JDS	91280	29100		
154	Rajarajeshwari Nagar	Munirathna	INC	71064	K L R Thimmananjaiah	JDS	52251	18813		
155	Dasarahalli	S. Muniraju	BJP	57562	B L Shankar	INC	46734	10828		
156	Mahalakshmi Layout	K. Gopalaiah	JDS	66127	N. L. Narendra Babu	INC	50757	15370		
157	Malleshwaram	C. N. Ashwath Narayan	BJP	57609	B. K. Shivaram	INC	36543	21066		
158	Hebbal	R. Jagadeesh Kumar	BJP	38162	C. K. Abdul Rahman Sharief	INC	33026	5136		
158	Hebbal	Y. A. Narayanaswamy	INC							
159	Pulakeshinagar	Akhanda Srinivas Murthy	JDS	48995	B. Prasanna Kumar	INC	38796	10199		
160	Sarvagnanagar	K. J. George	INC	69673	Padmanabha Reddy	BJP	46820	22853		
161	C. V. Raman Nagar	S. Raghu	BJP	53364	P. Ramesh	INC	44945	8419		
162	Shivajinagar	R. Roshan Baig	INC	49649	Nirmal Surana	BJP	28794	20855		
163	Shanti Nagar	N. A. Haris	INC	54342	K. Vasudeva Murthy	JDS	34155	20187		
164	Gandhi Nagar	Dinesh Gundu Rao	INC	54968	P. C. Mohan	BJP	32361	22607		
165	Rajaji Nagar	S. Suresh Kumar	BJP	39291	R. Manjula Naidu	INC	24524	14767		
166	Govindraj Nagar	Priya Krishna	INC	72654	H. Ravindra	BJP	30194	42460		
167	Vijay Nagar	M. Krishnappa	INC	76891	V. Somanna	BJP	44249	32642		
168	Chamrajpet	B. Z. Zameer Ahmed Khan	JDS	56339	G. A. Bava	INC	26177	30162		
169	Chickpet	R. V. Devraj	INC	44714	Uday. B. Garudachar	BJP	31655	13059		
170	Basavanagudi	L. A. Ravi Subramanya	BJP	43876	K. Bagegowda	JDS	24163	19713		
171	Padmanaba Nagar	R. Ashoka	BJP	53680	L. S. Chethan Gowda	INC	33557	20123		
172	B.T.M. Layout	Ramalinga Reddy	INC	69712	N. Sudhakar	BJP	20664	49048		
173	Jayanagar	B. N. Vijaya Kumar	BJP	43990	M. C. Venugopal	INC	31678	12312		
174	Mahadevapura	Arvind Limbavali	BJP	110244	A. C. Srinivas	INC	104095	6149		
175	Bommanahalli	M. Satish Reddy	BJP	86552	Nagabhushana. C	INC	60700	25852		
176	Bangalore South	M. Krishnappa	BJP	102207	R. Prabhakara Reddy	JDS	72045	30162		
177	Anekal	B.Shivanna	INC	105464	A. Narayanaswamy	BJP	65282	40182		
Bangalore Rural district
178	Hoskote	M. T. B. Nagaraj	INC	85238	B. N. Bache Gowda	BJP	78099	7139		
179	Devanahalli	Pilla Munishamappa	JDS	70323	Venkataswamy	INC	68381	1942		
180	Doddaballapur	T. Venkataramanaiah	INC	38877	B Munegowda	Ind	37430	1447		
181	Nelamangala	K.Srinivasa Murthy	JDS	60492	Anjanamurthy	INC	45389	15103		
Ramanagara district
182	Magadi	H C Balakrishna	JDS	74821	A. Manjunath	INC	60462	14359		
183	Ramanagaram	H. D. Kumaraswamy	JDS	83447	Maridevaru	INC	58049	25398		
184	Kanakapura	D. K. Shivakumar	INC	100007	P. G. R Sindhia	JDS	68583	31424		
185	Channapatna	C. P. Yogeeshwara	SP	80099	Anitha Kumaraswamy	JDS	73635	6464		
Mandya district
186	Malavalli	P M Narendraswamy	INC	61869	K. Annadani	JDS	61331	538		
187	Maddur	D. C. Thammanna	JDS	80926	Madhu G. Madegowda	INC	48968	31958		
188	Melukote	K. S. Puttannaiah	Sarvodaya Karnataka Paksha	80041	C. S. Puttaraju	JDS	70193	9848		
189	Mandya	M. H. Ambareesh	INC	90329	M. Srinivas	JDS	47392	42937		
190	Shrirangapattana	A. B. Ramesha Bandisiddegowda	JDS	55204	Ravindra Srikantaiah	Ind	41580	13624		
191	Nagamangala	N. Chaluvaraya Swamy	JDS	89203	Suresh Gowda	INC	68840	20363		
192	Krishnarajpet	Narayana Gowda	JDS	56784	K B Chandrashekar	INC	47541	9243		
Hassan district
193	Shravanabelagola	C. N. Balakrishna	JDS	87185	C. S. Putte Gowda	INC	63043	24142		
194	Arsikere	K. M. Shivalinge Gowda	JDS	76579	B. Shivaramu	INC	46948	29631		
195	Belur	Y. N Rudresha Gowda	INC	48802	K. S. Lingesha	JDS	41273	7529		
196	Hassan	H. S. Prakash	JDS	61306	H. K. Mahesh	INC	57110	4196		
197	Holenarasipur	H. D. Revanna	JDS	92713	S. G. Anupama	INC	62655	30058		
198	Arkalgud	A. Manju	INC	61369	A. T. Ramaswamy	JDS	52575	8794		
199	Sakleshpur	H. K. Kumaraswamy	JDS	63602	D. Mallesh	INC	30533	33069		
Dakshina Kannada
200	Belthangady	K. Vasantha Bangera	INC	74530	Ranjan G. Gowda	BJP	58789	15741		
201	Moodabidri	Abhayachandra Jain	INC	53180	Umanatha Kotian	BJP	48630	4550		
202	Mangalore City North	Mohiuddin Bava	INC	69897	J. Krishna Palemar	BJP	64524	5373		
203	Mangalore City South	John Richard Lobo	INC	67829	N. Yogish Bhat	BJP	55554	12275		
204	Mangalore	U. T. Khader	INC	69450	Chandrahas Ullal	BJP	40339	29111		
205	Bantval	Ramanath Rai	INC	81665	U Rajesh Naik	BJP	63815	17850		
206	Puttur	Shakunthala T. Shetty	INC	66345	Sanjeeva Matandoor	BJP	62056	4289		
207	Sullia	Angara S.	BJP	65913	B. Raghu	INC	64540	1373		
Kodagu district
208	Madikeri	Appachu Ranjan	BJP	56696	B. A. Jeevijaya	JDS	52067	4629		
209	Virajpet	K. G. Bopaiah	BJP	67250	Biddatanda. T. Pradeep	INC	63836	3414		
Mysore district
210	Periyapatna	K. Venkatesh	INC	62045	K. Mahadeva	JDS	59957	2088		
211	Krishnarajanagara	S. R. Mahesh	JDS	81457	Doddaswame Gowda	INC	66405	15052		
212	Hunsuru	H. P. Manjunath	INC	83930	Kumaraswamy	JDS	43723	40207		
213	Heggadadevankote	Chikkamadu S	JDS	48606	Chikkanna	INC	36108	12498		
214	Nanjangud	Srinivasa Prasad	INC	50784	Kalale N . Keshavamurthy	JDS	41843	8941		
214	Nanjangud	Kalale N . Keshavamurthy	INC		Srinivasa Prasad	BJP				
215	Chamundeshwari	GT Devegowda	JDS	75864	M. Sathyanarayana	INC	68761	7103		
216	Krishnaraja	M. K. Somashekar	INC	52611	S. A. Ramadas	BJP	46546	6065		
217	Chamaraja	Vasu	INC	41930	H. S. Shankaralinge Gowda	JDS	29015	12915		
218	Narasimharaja	Tanveer Sait	INC	38037	Abdul Majid K H	SDPI	29667	8370		
219	Varuna	Siddaramaiah	INC	84385	Kapu Siddalingaswamy	KJP	54744	29641		
220	T Narasipura	H. C. Mahadevappa	INC	53219	M. C. Sundareshan	JDS	52896	323		
Chamarajanagar district
221	Hanur	R. Narendra	INC	55684	Parimala Nagappa	JDS	44135	11549		
222	Kollegal	S. Jayanna	INC	47402	N. Mahesh	BSP	37209	10193		
223	Chamrajanagar	C. Puttarangashetty	INC	54440	K. R. Mallikarjunappa	KJP	43244	11196		
224	Gundlupet	H. S. Mahadeva Prasad	INC	73723	C. S. Niranjan Kumar	KJP	66048	7675		
224	Gundlupet	Mohana Kumari @ Geetha Mahadeva Prasad	INC		C. S. Niranjan Kumar	BJP				
225	Nominated	Vinisha Nero								

Sources: Election Commission of India

== Governor ==
- Hansraj Bhardwaj (24 June 2009 – 29 June 2014)
- Konijeti Rosaiah (29 June 2014 – 31 August 2014)
- Vajubhai Rudabhai Vala (1 September 2014 – 10 July 2021)

== Speaker ==
- Kagodu Thimmappa, INC from 31 May 2013 – 19 June 2016
- K. B. Koliwad, INC from 5 July 2016 – 18 May 2018

== Deputy Speaker ==
N.H SHIVSHANKAR REDDY

== Leader of the House ==
=== Legislative Assembly ===
Siddaramaiah (Chief Minister), INC from 13 May 2013 – 15 May 2018

== Deputy Leader of the House (Deputy Chief Minister) ==
=== Legislative Assembly ===
BS Yeddyurappa

== Leader of the Opposition ==
- H.D. Kumarswamy, JD(S) from 31 May 2013 – 22 January 2014
- Jagadish Shettar, BJP from 23 January 2014 – 17 May 2018

== See also ==
- 2013 Karnataka Legislative Assembly election
- Siddaramaiah ministry
- Karnataka Legislative Assembly
