= 2013 Karnataka Legislative Assembly election =

2013 Karnataka Legislative Assembly Election
- 5 May 2013

All 224 seats in the Legislative Assembly of Karnataka 113 seats needed for a majority
- Turnout: 71.83 pp (▲7.15 pp)
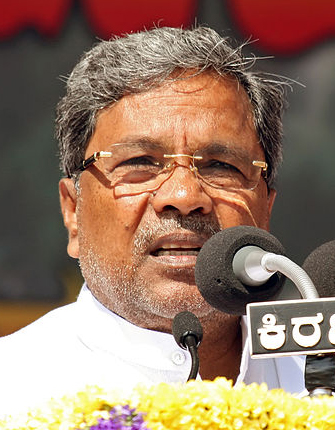

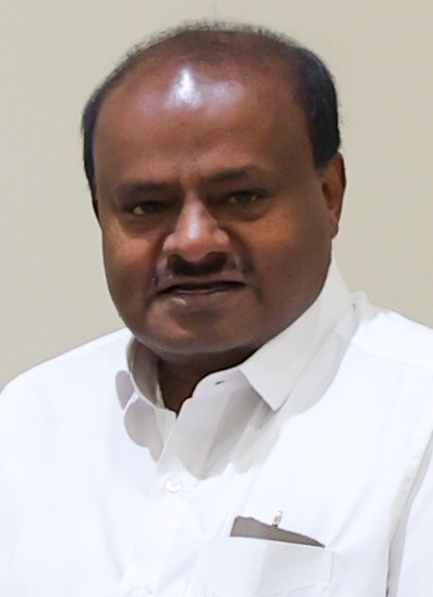

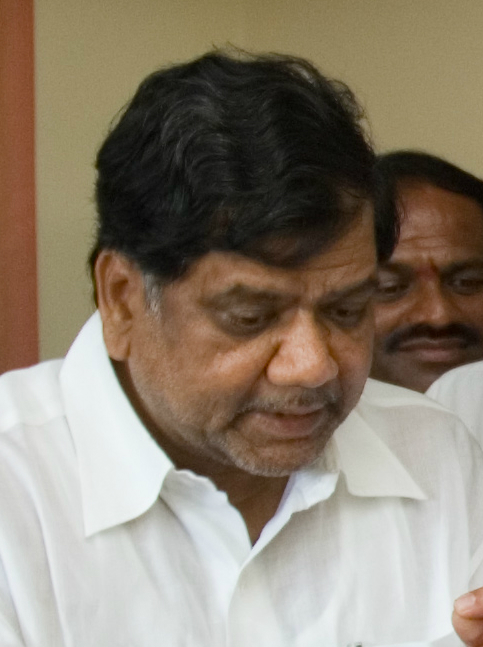
	Majority party	Minority party	Third party
Leader	Siddaramaiah	H. D. Kumaraswamy	Jagadish Shettar
Party	INC	JD(S)	BJP
Alliance	UPA	-	NDA
Leader since	2013	2006	2012
Leader's seat	Varuna	Ramanagara	Hubli-Dharwad Central
Seats before	80	28	110
Seats won	122	40	40
Seat change	▲42	▲12	▼70
Popular vote	11,473,025	6,329,158	6,236,227
Percentage	36.59%	20.19%	19.89%
Swing	▲1.83 pp	▲1.23 pp	▼13.67 pp
Chief Minister before election
Jagadish Shettar
BJP
Elected Chief Minister
Siddaramaiah
INC

The 2013 Karnataka Legislative Assembly election was held on 5 May 2013 to elect members from 223 constituencies in the Indian state of Karnataka. The election for the Piriyapatna constituency was postponed to 28 May 2013 due to the death of the BJP candidate for the seat. The voter turnout in the state was 70.23%.

Five major political parties contested the election: Indian National Congress (INC) led by Siddaramaiah, Bharatiya Janata Party (BJP) led by Chief Minister Jagadish Shettar, Janata Dal (Secular) (JD(S)) led by H. D. Kumaraswamy, B. S. Yediyurappa's Karnataka Janata Paksha (KJP) and B. Sriramulu's Badavara Shramikara Raitara Congress (BSRCP).

The INC won the election with an absolute majority of 122 seats, including the Piriyapatna seat, nine more than the majority mark of 113. As a result, the INC returned to power on its own after nine years with Siddaramaiah becoming the chief minister.

== Background ==
In 2008, the BJP under the leadership of B. S. Yeddyurappa, won 110 seats, emerging as the single largest party. As the party did not have a majority of its own, having not won 113+ seats, it had to form a government with the support of a few independent MLA's. The BJP thus came to power for the first time in South India with Yeddyurappa becoming the chief minister of Karnataka.

However, the five years in which BJP was in power in Karnataka was not smooth and was mired in many controversies. A few months after coming to power, the BJP encouraged Congress and JD(S) MLA's to defect to the BJP to boost its strength in the assembly. Yeddyurappa had to face many revolts over his style of functioning from the Reddy brothers (Karunakara, Somashekara and Janardhana) and B. Sriramulu, a faction led by Balachandra Jarkiholi and the old BJP loyalists led by Ananth Kumar. Janardhana Reddy was arrested in the Bellary illegal mining scam in 2011. Some BJP leaders like Katta Subramanya Naidu, Ess Enn Krishnaiah Setty and Yeddyurappa were imprisoned for some time for their role in individual land scams. Yeddyurappa and Kumaraswamy of JD(S) were accused of encouraging illegal mining, though were cleared later by the High Court of Karnataka.

In its five years of rule, the BJP had three chief ministers. Yeddyurappa was forced to resign as Chief Minister in July 2011 due to his alleged involvement in a land scam. He was replaced by his handpicked successor and loyalist D. V. Sadananda Gowda, who faced a challenge from Jagadish Shettar, the chief minister choice for Yeddyurappa's opponents in the BJP. However, Gowda soon fell out with Yeddyurappa and the latter began to revolt against him, threatening to quit the BJP if Gowda was not removed. The BJP High Command replaced Gowda with Shettar, only 11 months after he became chief minister. Shettar was another Lingayat BJP leader whom Yeddyurappa opposed becoming his successor just less than a year ago as they were from the same caste.

In local body elections, the Congress and the JD(S) won more seats while the BJP was pushed to third. In the by-election to the Udupi Chimagalur Lok Sabha seat held in March 2012, the Congress won.

Yeddyurappa quit the BJP in November 2012 and formed his own party, the Karnataka Janata Paksha (KJP). Previously, Sriramulu had quit the BJP in 2011 to form the Badavara Shramikara Raitara Congress (BSR Congress) after Janardhana Reddy was imprisoned. These splits weakened the BJP.

== Parties and alliances ==
=== United Progressive Alliance ===
Party	Flag	Symbol	Leader	Contesting seats
Indian National Congress			Siddaramaiah	224

=== National Democratic Alliance ===
Party	Flag	Symbol	Leader	Contesting seats
Bharatiya Janata Party			Jagadish Shettar	224

=== Janata Dal (Secular) ===
Party	Flag	Symbol	Leader	Contesting seats
Janata Dal (Secular)			H. D. Kumaraswamy	224

=== Others ===
Party	Flag	Symbol	Leader	Contesting seats
Karnataka Janata Paksha			B. S. Yediyurappa	204
BSR Congress Party			B. Sriramulu	176
Samajwadi Party			Akhilesh Yadav	27

== Election ==
The election was held in a single phase on 5 May 2013 for 223 out of total 224 seats. A voter turnout of 70.23% was recorded. 50,446 polling stations were set up for the 41.8 million voters in Karnataka. The election in the constituency of Periyapatna was adjourned due to the death of the BJP candidate, Sannamogegowda, a day before polls.

== Results ==
Summary of the 5 May 2013 Karnataka Legislative Assembly election results
Parties and coalitions	Popular vote			Seats			
Parties and coalitions	Vote	%	+/-	Contested	Won	+/-	%
Indian National Congress	11,473,025	36.59	▲1.83	223	122	▲43	54.46
Janata Dal (Secular)	6,329,158	20.19	▲1.23	222	40	▲12	17.86
Bharatiya Janata Party	6,236,227	19.89	▼13.67	222	40	▼72	17.86
Karnataka Janata Paksha	3,069,207	9.79	▲9.79	204	6	▲6	2.68
Badavara Shramikara Raitara Congress	844,588	2.69	▲2.69	176	4	▲4	1.79
Samajwadi Party	105,948	0.34	▼0.6	27	1	▲1	0.45
Karnataka Makkala Paksha	55,867	0.18	▲0.2	7	1	▲1	0.44
Sarvodaya Karnataka Party	109,039	0.35	▼0.1	6	1	▲1	0.44
Independents	2,313,386	7.38	▲0.5	1,217	9	▲3	4.02
Other parties and candidates	816,009	2.60		644	0	Steady	0.0
Total	31,352,454	100.00		2948	224	±0	100.0
Valid votes	31,352,454	99.91					
Invalid votes	28,682	0.09					
Votes cast / turnout	31,381,136	71.83					
Abstentions	12,304,603	28.17					
Registered voters	43,685,739						
Source: Election Commission of India

=== Results by district ===
District	Seats				
District	Seats	BJP	INC	JDS	OTH
Belagavi	18	8	6	—N/a	4
Bagalkot	7	1	6	—N/a	—N/a
Kalaburagi	9	1	7	—N/a	1
Yadgir	4	—N/a	3	—N/a	1
Vijayapura	8	1	7	—N/a	—N/a
Bidar	6	1	2	1	2
Raichur	7	1	4	2	—N/a
Koppal	5	1	3	1	—N/a
Gadag	4	—N/a	4	—N/a	—N/a
Dharwad	7	2	4	1	—N/a
Uttara Kannada	6	1	3	—N/a	2
Haveri	6	1	4	—N/a	1
Ballari	9	1	4	1	3
Chitradurga	6	1	4	—N/a	1
Davanagere	7	—N/a	6	1	—N/a
Shimoga	7	—N/a	3	3	1
Udupi	5	1	3	—N/a	1
Chikmagalur	5	2	1	2	—N/a
Dakshina Kannada	8	1	7	—N/a	—N/a
Tumakuru	11	1	4	6	—N/a
Chikkaballapur	5	—N/a	2	2	1
Kolar	6	1	2	1	2
Bengaluru Urban	28	12	13	3	—N/a
Bengaluru Rural	4	—N/a	2	2	—N/a
Ramanagara	4	—N/a	1	2	1
Mandya	7	—N/a	2	4	1
Hassan	7	—N/a	2	5	—N/a
Kodagu	2	2	—N/a	—N/a	—N/a
Mysore	11	—N/a	8	3	—N/a
Chamarajanagar	4	—N/a	4	—N/a	—N/a
Total	224	40	122	40	22

=== Results by constituency ===
Source.

District	Constituency		Winner				Runner up				Margin	%
District	#	Name	Candidate	Party	Votes	%	Candidate	Party	Votes	%	Margin	%
Belagavi	1	Nippani	Shashikala Jolle	BJP	81,860	53.61	Kakaso P. Patil	INC	63,198	41.39	18,662	12.22
Belagavi	2	Chikkodi-Sadalga	Prakash Hukkeri	INC	1,02,237	68.44	Basavanni Sangappagol	BJP	25,649	17.17	76,588	51.27
Belagavi	3	Athani	Laxman Savadi	BJP	74,299	50.79	Mahesh Kumathalli	INC	50,528	34.54	23,771	16.25
Belagavi	4	Kagwad	Bharamgouda Alagouda Kage	BJP	41,784	32.34	Shrimant Patil	JD(S)	38,897	30.11	2,887	2.23
Belagavi	5	Kudachi	P. Rajeev	BSR	71,057	61.59	Ghatage Shama Bhima	INC	24,823	21.52	46,234	40.07
Belagavi	6	Raybag	Duryodhan Aihole	BJP	37,535	30.74	Pradeep Ramu Malagi	IND	36,706	30.06	829	0.68
Belagavi	7	Hukkeri	Umesh Katti	BJP	81,810	61.53	Ravi Basavaraj Karale	INC	24,484	18.41	57,326	43.12
Belagavi	8	Arabhavi	Balachandra Jarkiholi	BJP	99,283	68.42	Utagi Ramappa Kareppa	INC	24,062	16.58	75,221	51.84
Belagavi	9	Gokak	Ramesh Jarkiholi	INC	79,175	54.86	Ashok Ningayyaswami Pujari	JD(S)	51,170	35.45	28,005	19.41
Belagavi	10	Yemkanmardi	Satish Jarkiholi	INC	70,726	56.78	Astagi Maruti Mallappa	BJP	46,376	37.23	24,350	19.55
Belagavi	11	Belgaum Uttar	Fairoz Nuruddin Saith	INC	45,125	39.18	Renu Suhas Killekar	IND	26,915	23.37	18,210	15.81
Belagavi	12	Belgaum Dakshin	Sambhaji Patil	IND	54,426	41.25	Abhay Patil	BJP	48,116	36.47	6,310	4.78
Belagavi	13	Belgaum Rural	Sanjay Patil	BJP	38,322	25.20	Kinekar M. Kallappa	IND	36,987	24.32	1,335	0.88
Belagavi	14	Khanapur	Arvind Patil	IND	37,055	27.47	Rafique Khatalsab Khanapuri	INC	20,903	15.50	16,152	11.97
Belagavi	15	Kittur	D. B. Inamdar	INC	53,924	42.81	Suresh S. Marihal	BJP	35,634	28.29	18,290	14.52
Belagavi	16	Bailhongal	Vishwanath Patil	KJP	40,709	32.11	Jagadish C. Metgud	BJP	37,088	29.25	3,621	2.86
Belagavi	17	Saundatti Yellamma	Anand Mamani	BJP	46,434	34.87	Ravindra B. Yaligar	INC	30,392	22.83	16,042	12.04
Belagavi	18	Ramdurg	Ashok Pattan	INC	42,310	32.76	Mahadevappa Yadawad	BJP	37,326	28.91	4,984	3.85
Bagalkot	19	Mudhol	Govind Karjol	BJP	64,727	50.14	R. B. Timmapur	INC	59,549	46.13	5,178	4.01
Bagalkot	20	Terdal	Umashree	INC	70,189	46.31	Siddu Savadi	BJP	67,590	44.60	2,599	1.71
Bagalkot	21	Jamkhandi	Siddu Nyamagouda	INC	49,145	37.30	Jagadish Gudagunti	IND	27,993	21.25	21,152	16.05
Bagalkot	22	Bilgi	J. T. Patil	INC	66,655	44.68	Murugesh Nirani	BJP	55,417	37.15	11,238	7.53
Bagalkot	23	Badami	B. B. Chimmanakatti	INC	57,446	41.31	Mahantesh G. Mamadapur	JD(S)	42,333	30.44	15,113	10.87
Bagalkot	24	Bagalkot	H. Y. Meti	INC	68,216	48.74	Veerabhadrayya Charantimath	BJP	65,316	46.67	2,900	2.07
Bagalkot	25	Hungund	Vijayanand Kashappanavar	INC	72,720	53.07	Doddanagouda G. Patil	BJP	56,923	41.54	15,797	11.53
Vijayapura	26	Muddebihal	C. S. Nadagouda	INC	34,747	30.29	Vimalabai Deshmukh	KJP	22,545	19.65	12,202	10.64
Vijayapura	27	Devar Hippargi	A. S. Patil	INC	36,231	31.44	Somanagouda. B. Patil	BJP	28,135	24.41	8,096	7.03
Vijayapura	28	Basavana Bagevadi	Shivanand Patil	INC	56,329	44.42	Bellubbi S. Kallappa	BJP	36,653	28.90	19,676	15.52
Vijayapura	29	Babaleshwar	M. B. Patil	INC	62,061	46.19	Vijugouda Patil	JD(S)	57,706	42.95	4,355	3.24
Vijayapura	30	Bijapur City	Makbul S. Bagawan	INC	48,615	40.85	Basangouda Patil Yatnal	JD(S)	39,235	32.96	9,380	7.89
Vijayapura	31	Nagthan	Raju Alagur	INC	45,570	32.54	Devanand Fulasing Chavan	JD(S)	44,903	32.07	667	0.47
Vijayapura	32	Indi	Yashavant Rayagoud Patil	INC	58,562	42.20	Ravikant S. Patil	KJP	25,260	18.20	33,302	24.00
Vijayapura	33	Sindgi	Ramesh Bhusanur	BJP	37,834	29.48	M. C. Managuli	JD(S)	37,082	28.89	752	0.59
Kalaburagi	34	Afzalpur	Malikayya Guttedar	INC	38,093	29.62	M. Y. Patil	KJP	32,855	25.55	5,238	4.07
Kalaburagi	35	Jevargi	Ajay Singh	INC	67,038	46.37	Doddappa Gouda S. Patil	BJP	30,338	20.99	36,700	25.38
Yadgir	36	Shorapur	Raja Venkatappa Naik	INC	65,033	44.48	Narasimha Nayak	JD(S)	60,958	41.69	4,075	2.79
Yadgir	37	Shahapur	Guru Patil Shiraval	KJP	54,924	43.21	Sharanabasappa Darshanapur	INC	49,128	38.65	5,796	4.56
Yadgir	38	Yadgir	Dr. Maalakareddy	INC	40,434	33.76	Veer Baswant Reddy	KJP	31,330	26.16	9,104	7.60
Yadgir	39	Gurmitkal	Baburao Chinchansur	INC	36,051	27.94	Naganagouda Kandkur	JD(S)	34,401	26.66	1,650	1.28
Kalaburagi	40	Chittapur	Priyank Kharge	INC	69,379	56.08	Valmiki Nayak	BJP	38,188	30.87	31,191	25.21
Kalaburagi	41	Sedam	Sharan Prakash Patil	INC	53,546	39.38	Rajkumar Patil	BJP	41,651	30.63	11,895	8.75
Kalaburagi	42	Chincholi	Umesh. G. Jadhav	INC	58,599	51.87	Sunil Vallyapure	KJP	32,539	28.80	26,060	23.07
Kalaburagi	43	Gulbarga Rural	G. Ram Krishna	INC	40,075	32.47	Revu Naik Belamgi	BJP	32,866	26.63	7,209	5.84
Kalaburagi	44	Gulbarga Dakshin	Dattatraya C. Patil Revoor	BJP	36,850	31.41	Shashil G. Namoshi	JD(S)	26,880	22.92	9,970	8.49
Kalaburagi	45	Gulbarga Uttar	Qamar ul Islam	INC	50,498	48.17	Nasir Hussain Ustad	KJP	30,377	28.97	20,121	19.20
Kalaburagi	46	Aland	B. R. Patil	KJP	67,085	50.67	Subhash Guttedar	JD(S)	49,971	37.75	17,114	12.92
Bidar	47	Basavakalyan	Mallikarjun Khuba	JD(S)	37,494	29.72	B. Narayan Rao	INC	21,601	17.12	15,893	12.60
Bidar	48	Homnabad	Rajashekar Patil	INC	64,694	47.56	M. Naseenoddin Patel	JD(S)	40,194	29.55	24,500	18.01
Bidar	49	Bidar South	Ashok Kheny	KMP	47,763	38.25	Bandeppa Kashempur	JD(S)	31,975	25.61	15,788	12.64
Bidar	50	Bidar	Gurupadappa Nagamarapalli	KJP	50,718	44.89	Rahim Khan	INC	48,147	42.62	2,571	2.27
Bidar	51	Bhalki	Eshwara Khandre	INC	58,012	39.44	D. K. Sidram	KJP	48,343	32.87	9,669	6.57
Bidar	52	Aurad	Prabhu Chauhan	BJP	61,826	47.89	Dhanaji Bheema Jadhav	KJP	38,635	29.93	23,191	17.96
Raichur	53	Raichur Rural	Thipparaju	BJP	50,497	37.48	Raja Rayappa Naik	INC	47,227	35.05	3,270	2.43
Raichur	54	Raichur	S. Shivaraj Patil	JD(S)	45,263	45.59	Syed Yasin	INC	37,392	37.66	7,871	7.93
Raichur	55	Manvi	G. Hampayya Nayak	INC	50,619	41.50	Raja Venkatappa Nayaka	JD(S)	43,632	35.77	6,987	5.73
Raichur	56	Devadurga	Venkatesh Nayak	INC	62,070	48.71	K. Shivanagouda Naik	BJP	58,370	45.81	3,700	2.90
Raichur	57	Lingsugur	Manappa D. Vajjal	JD(S)	31,737	24.49	D. S. Hoolageri	INC	30,451	23.50	1,286	0.99
Raichur	58	Sindhanur	Hampanagouda Badarli	INC	49,213	33.89	K. Kariyappa	BSR	36,197	24.93	13,016	8.96
Raichur	59	Maski	Pratapagouda Patil	INC	45,552	43.08	Mahadevappa Gowda	KJP	26,405	24.97	19,147	18.11
Koppal	60	Kushtagi	Doddanagouda H. Patil	BJP	44,007	31.83	Amaregouda L. Patil Bayyapur	INC	40,970	29.64	3,037	2.19
Koppal	61	Kanakagiri	Shivaraj Tangadagi	INC	49,451	36.51	Basavaraj Dadhesuguru	KJP	44,399	32.78	5,052	3.73
Koppal	62	Gangawati	Iqbal Ansari	JD(S)	60,303	48.11	Paranna Munavalli	BJP	30,514	24.34	29,789	23.77
Koppal	63	Yelburga	Basavaraj Rayareddy	INC	52,388	38.32	Halappa Achar	BJP	35,488	25.95	16,900	12.37
Koppal	64	Koppal	K. Raghavendra Hitnal	INC	81,062	53.54	Karadi Sanganna Amarappa	BJP	54,274	35.84	26,788	17.70
Gadag	65	Shirahatti	Doddamani R. Shiddlingappa	INC	44,738	34.09	Ramappa Sobeppa Lamani	BJP	44,423	33.85	315	0.24
Gadag	66	Gadag	H. K. Patil	INC	70,475	51.70	Anil P. Menasinakai	BSR	36,748	26.96	33,727	24.74
Gadag	67	Ron	Gurupadagouda Patil	INC	74,593	51.12	Kalakappa Bandi	BJP	56,366	38.63	18,227	12.49
Gadag	68	Nargund	B. R. Yavagal	INC	59,620	46.35	C. C. Patil	BJP	51,035	39.68	8,585	6.67
Dharwad	69	Navalgund	N. H. Konaraddi	JD(S)	44,448	32.36	Shankar Patil Munenakoppa	BJP	41,779	30.42	2,669	1.94
Dharwad	70	Kundgol	C. S. Shivalli	INC	52,690	40.68	Siddangouda C. Ishwargoud	KJP	31,618	24.41	21,072	16.27
Dharwad	71	Dharwad	Vinay Kulkarni	INC	53,453	40.18	Amrut Desai	JD(S)	35,133	26.41	18,320	13.77
Dharwad	72	Hubli-Dharwad-East	Abbayya Prasad	INC	42,353	38.82	Veerabhadrappa Halaharavi	BJP	28,831	26.43	13,522	12.39
Dharwad	73	Hubli-Dharwad-Central	Jagadish Shettar	BJP	58,201	49.61	Mahesh Nalwad	INC	40,447	34.48	17,754	15.13
Dharwad	74	Hubli-Dharwad-West	Arvind Bellad	BJP	42,003	33.10	S. R. Morey	INC	30,821	24.29	11,182	8.81
Dharwad	75	Kalghatgi	Santosh Lad	INC	76,802	58.37	Nimbannavar C. Mallappa	KJP	31,141	23.67	45,661	34.70
Uttara Kannada	76	Haliyal	R. V. Deshpande	INC	55,005	45.78	Sunil Hegade	JD(S)	49,066	40.84	5,939	4.94
Uttara Kannada	77	Karwar	Satish Krishna Sail	IND	80,727	55.51	Anand Asnotikar	BJP	44,847	30.84	35,880	24.67
Uttara Kannada	78	Kumta	Sharada Mohan Shetty	INC	36,756	29.58	Dinakar Keshav Shetty	JD(S)	36,336	29.24	420	0.34
Uttara Kannada	79	Bhatkal	Mankala Vaidya	IND	37,319	27.74	Enayathullah Shabandri	JD(S)	27,435	20.40	9,884	7.34
Uttara Kannada	80	Sirsi	Vishweshwar Hegde Kageri	BJP	42,854	32.67	Deepak Honnavar	INC	39,795	30.33	3,059	2.34
Uttara Kannada	81	Yellapur	Arbail Shivaram Hebbar	INC	58,025	48.06	V. S. Patil	BJP	33,533	27.77	24,492	20.29
Haveri	82	Hangal	Manohar Tahasildar	INC	66,324	45.93	C. M. Udasi	KJP	60,638	41.99	5,686	3.94
Haveri	83	Shiggaon	Basavaraj Bommai	BJP	73,007	48.64	Syed Azeempeer Khadri	INC	63,504	42.31	9,503	6.33
Haveri	84	Haveri	Rudrappa Lamani	INC	83,119	55.24	Neharu Olekara	KJP	52,911	35.16	30,208	20.08
Haveri	85	Byadgi	Basavaraj Shivannanavar	INC	57,707	38.51	Shivaraj Sajjanar	KJP	44,348	29.60	13,359	8.91
Haveri	86	Hirekerur	U. B. Banakar	KJP	52,623	39.57	B. C. Patil	INC	50,017	37.61	2,606	1.96
Haveri	87	Ranibennur	K. B. Koliwad	INC	53,780	33.79	R. Shankar	IND	46,992	29.52	6,788	4.27
Vijayanagara	88	Hadagalli	P. T. Parameshwar Naik	INC	59,336	51.11	B. Chandra Naik	BJP	18,526	15.96	40,810	35.15
Vijayanagara	89	Hagaribommanahalli	L. B. P. Bheema Naik	JD(S)	51,972	35.89	K. Nemaraj Naik	BJP	51,847	35.80	125	0.09
Vijayanagara	90	Vijayanagara	Anand Singh	BJP	69,995	56.12	H. Abdul Wahab	INC	39,358	31.56	30,637	24.56
Ballary	91	Kampli	T. H. Suresh Babu	BSR	70,858	50.51	J. N. Ganesh	IND	36,462	25.99	34,396	24.52
Ballary	92	Siruguppa	B. M. Nagaraja	INC	65,490	51.66	M. S. Somalingappa	BJP	43,676	34.45	21,814	17.21
Ballary	93	Bellary	B. Sriramulu	BSR	74,854	57.44	Asundi Vannurappa	INC	41,560	31.89	33,294	25.55
Ballary	94	Bellary City	Anil Lad	INC	52,098	43.61	S. Murali Krishna	BSR	33,898	28.37	18,200	15.24
Ballary	95	Sandur	E. Tukaram	INC	62,246	48.48	R. Dhananjaya	JD(S)	27,615	21.51	34,631	26.97
Vijayanagara	96	Kudligi	B. Nagendra	IND	71,477	53.77	S. Venkatesh	INC	46,674	35.11	24,803	18.66
Chitradurga	97	Molakalmuru	S. Thippeswamy	BSR	76,827	46.73	N. Y. Gopalakrishna	INC	69,658	42.37	7,169	4.36
Chitradurga	98	Challakere	T. Raghumurthy	INC	60,197	40.74	K. T. Kumaraswamy	KJP	37,074	25.09	23,123	15.65
Chitradurga	99	Chitradurga	G. H. Thippareddy	BJP	62,228	38.09	Basavarajan	JD(S)	35,510	21.74	26,718	16.35
Chitradurga	100	Hiriyur	D. Sudhakar	INC	71,661	44.68	A. Krishnappa	JD(S)	70,456	43.93	1,205	0.75
Chitradurga	101	Hosadurga	B. G. Govindappa	INC	58,010	41.43	Gulihatti D. Shekar	IND	37,993	27.14	20,017	14.29
Chitradurga	102	Holalkere (SC)	H. Anjaneya	INC	76,856	47.16	M. Chandrappa	KJP	63,992	39.26	12,864	7.90
Devangere	103	Jagalur (ST)	H. P. Rajesh	INC	77,805	58.88	S. V. Ramachandra	KJP	40,915	30.96	36,890	27.92
Vijayanagara	104	Harapanahalli	M.P. Ravindra	INC	56,954	37.91	G. Karunakara Reddy	BJP	48,548	32.32	8,406	5.59
Devangere	105	Harihar	H. S. Shivashankar	JD(S)	59,666	39.58	S. Ramappa	INC	40,613	26.94	19,053	12.64
Devangere	106	Davanagere North	S. S. Mallikarjun	INC	88,101	65.53	S. A. Ravindranath	BJP	30,821	22.92	57,280	42.61
Devangere	107	Davanagere South	Shamanuru Shivashankarappa	INC	66,320	55.08	Karekatte Syed Saifulla	JD(S)	26,162	21.73	40,158	33.35
Devangere	108	Mayakonda (SC)	K. Shivamurthy	INC	32,435	24.02	N. Linganna	KJP	31,741	23.51	694	0.51
Devangere	109	Channagiri	Vadnal Rajanna	INC	53,355	37.21	K. Madal Virupakshappa	KJP	51,582	35.97	1,773	1.24
Devangere	110	Honnali	D. G. Shanthana Gowda	INC	78,789	52.84	M. P. Renukacharya	KJP	60,051	40.27	18,738	12.57
Shimoga	111	Shimoga Rural (SC)	Sharada Puryanaik	JD(S)	48,639	33.94	G. Basavannappa	KJP	38,530	26.89	10,109	7.05
Shimoga	112	Bhadravati	M. J. Appaji	JD(S)	78,370	54.59	B. K. Sangameshwara	IND	34,271	23.87	44,099	30.72
Shimoga	113	Shimoga	K. B. Prasanna Kumar	INC	39,355	28.18	S. Rudregowda	KJP	39,077	27.98	278	0.20
Shimoga	114	Tirthahalli	Kimmane Rathnakar	INC	37,160	26.69	R. M. Manjunatha Gowda	KJP	35,817	25.73	1,343	0.96
Shimoga	115	Shikaripura	B. S. Yediyurappa	KJP	69,126	49.89	H. S. Shanthaveerappa Gowda	INC	44,701	32.26	24,425	17.63
Shimoga	116	Sorab	Madhu Bangarappa	JD(S)	58,541	41.47	Hartalu Halappa	KJP	37,316	26.44	21,225	15.03
Shimoga	117	Sagar	Kagodu Thimmappa	INC	71,960	52.37	B. R. Jayanth	KJP	30,712	22.35	41,248	30.02
Udupi	118	Byndoor	K Gopala Poojary	INC	82,277	55.56	B. M. Sukumar Shetty	BJP	51,128	34.52	31,149	21.04
Udupi	119	Kundapura	Halady Srinivas Shetty	IND	80,563	57.97	Mallyadi Shivarama Shetty	INC	39,952	28.75	40,611	29.22
Udupi	120	Udupi	Pramod Madhwaraj	INC	86,868	62.75	B. Sudhakar Shetty	BJP	47,344	34.20	39,524	28.55
Udupi	121	Kapu	Vinay Kumar Sorake	INC	52,782	46.36	Lalaji Mendon	BJP	50,927	44.73	1,855	1.63
Udupi	122	Karkal	V. Sunil Kumar	BJP	65,039	49.85	H. Gopal Bhandary	INC	60,785	46.59	4,254	3.26
Chikmagalur	123	Sringeri	D. N. Jeevaraj	BJP	58,402	48.69	T. D. Rajegowda	INC	54,950	45.81	3,452	2.88
Chikmagalur	124	Mudigere (SC)	B. B. Ningaiah	JD(S)	32,417	29.41	B. N. Chandrappa	INC	31,782	28.83	635	0.58
Chikmagalur	125	Chikmagalur	C. T. Ravi	BJP	58,683	42.20	K. S. Shanthe Gowda	INC	47,695	34.30	10,988	7.90
Chikmagalur	126	Tarikere	G. H. Srinivasa	INC	35,817	28.72	D. S. Suresh	KJP	34,918	28.00	899	0.72
Chikmagalur	127	Kadur	Y. S. V. Datta	JD(S)	68,733	48.56	Belli Prakash	KJP	26,300	18.58	42,433	29.98
Tumakuru	128	Chiknayakanhalli	C. B. Suresh Babu	JD(S)	60,759	37.78	J. C. Madhu Swamy	KJP	49,620	30.85	11,139	6.93
Tumakuru	129	Tiptur	K. Shadakshari	INC	56,817	40.51	B. C. Nagesh	BJP	45,215	32.24	11,602	8.27
Tumakuru	130	Turuvekere	M. T. Krishnappa	JD(S)	66,089	47.18	Masala Jayaram	KJP	57,164	40.81	8,925	6.37
Tumakuru	131	Kunigal	D. Nagarajaiah	JD(S)	44,575	31.27	D. Krishnakumar	BJP	34,943	24.51	9,632	6.76
Tumakuru	132	Tumkur City	Rafiq Ahmed	INC	43,681	31.58	G. B. Jyothi Ganesh	KJP	40,073	28.97	3,608	2.61
Tumakuru	133	Tumkur Rural	B. Suresh Gowda	BJP	55,029	37.50	D. C. Gowri Shankar	JD(S)	53,457	36.43	1,572	1.07
Tumakuru	134	Koratagere (SC)	P. R. Sudhakara Lal	JD(S)	72,229	47.44	G. Parameshwara	INC	54,074	35.52	18,155	11.92
Tumakuru	135	Gubbi	S. R. Srinivas	JD(S)	58,783	42.09	G. N. Bettaswamy	KJP	51,539	36.90	7,244	5.19
Tumakuru	136	Sira	T. B. Jayachandra	INC	74,089	46.47	B. Sathyanarayana	JD(S)	59,408	37.26	14,681	9.21
Tumakuru	137	Pavagada (SC)	K. M. Thimmarayappa	JD(S)	68,686	47.25	H. V. Venkatesh	INC	63,823	43.90	4,863	3.35
Tumakuru	138	Madhugiri	K. N. Rajanna	INC	75,086	50.97	M. V. Veerabhadraiah	JD(S)	60,659	41.18	14,427	9.79
Chikkaballapura	139	Gauribidanur	N. H. Shivashankara Reddy	INC	50,131	33.61	K. Jaipala Reddy	IND	44,056	29.53	6,075	4.08
Chikkaballapura	140	Bagepalli	S. N. Subbareddy	IND	66,227	44.01	G. V. Sreerama Reddy	CPM	35,472	23.57	30,755	20.44
Chikkaballapura	141	Chikkaballapur	K. Sudhakar	INC	74,914	51.06	K. P. Bachegowda	JD(S)	59,866	40.81	15,048	10.25
Chikkaballapura	142	Sidlaghatta	M. Rajanna	JD(S)	77,931	50.69	V. Muniyappa	INC	62,452	40.62	15,479	10.07
Chikkaballapura	143	Chintamani	J. K. Krishnareddy	JD(S)	68,950	43.61	M. C. Sudhakar	IND	67,254	42.54	1,696	1.07
Kolar	144	Srinivaspur	K. R. Ramesh Kumar	INC	83,426	49.40	G. K. Venkatashiva Reddy	JD(S)	79,533	47.10	3,893	2.30
Kolar	145	Mulbagal (SC)	Kothur G. Manjunath	IND	73,146	52.74	N. Munianjanappa	JD(S)	39,412	28.42	33,734	24.32
Kolar	146	Kolar Gold Field (SC)	Y. Ramakka	BJP	55,014	46.87	M. Backthavachalam	JD(S)	28,992	24.70	26,022	22.17
Kolar	147	Bangarapet (SC)	S. N. Narayanaswamy	INC	71,570	50.45	M. Narayana Swamy	BJP	43,193	30.45	28,377	20.00
Kolar	148	Kolar	Varthur Prakash	IND	62,957	38.51	K. Srinivasa Gowda	JD(S)	50,366	30.81	12,591	7.70
Kolar	149	Malur	K. S. Manjunath Gowda	JD(S)	57,645	40.28	Krisshnaiah Setty	IND	38,876	27.16	18,769	13.12
Bangalore Urban	150	Yelahanka	S. R. Vishwanath	BJP	75,507	38.50	B. Chandrappa	JD(S)	57,110	29.12	18,397	9.38
Bangalore Urban	151	K.r.pura	Byrati Basavaraj	INC	1,06,299	53.10	N. S. Nandiesha Reddy	BJP	82,298	41.11	24,001	11.99
Bangalore Urban	152	Byatarayanapura	Krishna Byre Gowda	INC	96,125	46.14	A. Ravi	BJP	63,725	30.59	32,400	15.55
Bangalore Urban	153	Yeshvanthapura	S. T. Somashekhar	INC	1,20,380	52.00	T. N. Javarayi Gowda	JD(S)	91,280	39.43	29,100	12.57
Bangalore Urban	154	Rajarajeshwarinagar	Munirathna	INC	71,064	37.40	K. L. R. Thimmananjaiah	JD(S)	52,251	27.50	18,813	9.90
Bangalore Urban	155	Dasarahalli	S. Muniraju	BJP	57,562	30.10	B. L. Shankar	INC	46,734	24.44	10,828	5.66
Bangalore Urban	156	Mahalakshmi Layout	K. Gopalaiah	JD(S)	66,127	44.73	N. L. Narendrababu	INC	50,757	34.33	15,370	10.40
Bangalore Urban	157	Malleshwaram	C. N. Ashwath Narayan	BJP	57,609	53.19	B. K. Shivaram	INC	36,543	33.74	21,066	19.45
Bangalore Urban	158	Hebbal	R. Jagadeesh Kumar	BJP	38,162	33.03	C. K. Abdul R. Sharief	INC	33,026	28.58	5,136	4.45
Bangalore Urban	159	Pulakeshinagar (SC)	Akhanda Srinivas Murthy	JD(S)	48,995	48.75	B. Prasanna Kumar	INC	38,796	38.60	10,199	10.15
Bangalore Urban	160	Sarvagnanagar	K. J. George	INC	69,673	49.53	Padmanabha Reddy	BJP	46,820	33.28	22,853	16.25
Bangalore Urban	161	C.V. Raman Nagar (SC)	S. Raghu	BJP	53,364	50.26	P. Ramesh	INC	44,945	42.33	8,419	7.93
Bangalore Urban	162	Shivajinagar	R. Roshan Baig	INC	49,649	54.62	Nirmal Surana	BJP	28,794	31.68	20,855	22.94
Bangalore Urban	163	Shanti Nagar	N. A. Haris	INC	54,342	52.45	K. Vasudeva Murthy	JD(S)	34,155	32.96	20,187	19.49
Bangalore Urban	164	Gandhi Nagar	Dinesh Gundu Rao	INC	54,968	49.60	P. C. Mohan	BJP	32,361	29.20	22,607	20.40
Bangalore Urban	165	Rajaji Nagar	S. Suresh Kumar	BJP	39,291	36.45	R. Manjula Naidu	INC	24,524	22.75	14,767	13.70
Bangalore Urban	166	Govindraj Nagar	Priya Krishna	INC	72,654	55.36	H. Ravindra	BJP	30,194	23.01	42,460	32.35
Bangalore Urban	167	Vijay Nagar	M. Krishnappa	INC	76,891	57.73	V. Somanna	BJP	44,249	33.22	32,642	24.51
Bangalore Urban	168	Chamrajpet	B. Z. Zameer Ahmed Khan	JD(S)	56,339	52.32	G. A. Bava	INC	26,177	24.31	30,162	28.01
Bangalore Urban	169	Chickpet	R. V. Devraj	INC	44,714	41.09	Uday B. Garudachar	BJP	31,655	29.09	13,059	12.00
Bangalore Urban	170	Basavanagudi	L. A. Ravi Subramanya	BJP	43,876	42.33	K. Bagegowda	JD(S)	24,163	23.31	19,713	19.02
Bangalore Urban	171	Padmanaba Nagar	R. Ashoka	BJP	53,680	41.82	L. S. Chethan Gowda	INC	33,557	26.14	20,123	15.68
Bangalore Urban	172	B.T.M Layout	Ramalinga Reddy	INC	69,712	63.10	N. Sudhakar	BJP	20,664	18.70	49,048	44.40
Bangalore Urban	173	Jayanagar	B. N. Vijaya Kumar	BJP	43,990	46.03	M. C. Venugopal	INC	31,678	33.15	12,312	12.88
Bangalore Urban	174	Mahadevapura (SC)	Arvind Limbavali	BJP	1,10,244	48.62	A. C. Srinivas	INC	1,04,095	45.91	6,149	2.71
Bangalore Urban	175	Bommanahalli	M. Satish Reddy	BJP	86,552	49.53	C. Nagabhushana	INC	60,700	34.74	25,852	14.79
Bangalore Urban	176	Bangalore South	M. Krishnappa	BJP	1,02,207	40.76	R. Prabhakara Reddy	JD(S)	72,045	28.73	30,162	12.03
Bangalore Urban	177	Anekal (SC)	B. Shivanna	INC	1,05,464	56.56	A. Narayanaswamy	BJP	65,282	35.01	40,182	21.55
Bangalore Rural	178	Hosakote	M. T. B. Nagaraj	INC	85,238	51.23	B. N. Bache Gowda	BJP	78,099	46.94	7,139	4.29
Bangalore Rural	179	Devanahalli (SC)	Pilla Munishamappa	JD(S)	70,323	45.80	Venkataswamy	INC	68,381	44.53	1,942	1.27
Bangalore Rural	180	Doddaballapur	T.Venkataramanaiah	INC	38,877	26.21	B. Munegowda	IND	37,430	25.24	1,447	0.97
Bangalore Rural	181	Nelamangala (SC)	K. Srinivasa Murthy	JD(S)	60,492	43.31	Anjanamurthy	INC	45,389	32.50	15,103	10.81
Ramanagara	182	Magadi	H. C. Balakrishna	JD(S)	74,821	44.00	A. Manjunath	INC	60,462	35.55	14,359	8.45
Ramanagara	183	Ramanagaram	H. D. Kumaraswamy	JD(S)	83,447	56.12	Maridevaru	INC	58,049	39.04	25,398	17.08
Ramanagara	184	Kanakapura	D. K. Shivakumar	INC	1,00,007	56.77	P. G. R Sindhiea	JD(S)	68,583	38.93	31,424	17.84
Ramanagara	185	Channapatna	C. P. Yogeshwara	SP	80,099	47.53	Anitha Kumaraswamy	JD(S)	73,635	43.70	6,464	3.83
Mandya	186	Malavalli (SC)	P. M. Narendra Swamy	INC	61,869	35.86	K. Annadani	JD(S)	61,331	35.54	538	0.32
Mandya	187	Maddur	D. C.Thammanna	JD(S)	80,926	51.79	Madhu Madegowda	INC	48,968	31.34	31,958	20.45
Mandya	188	Melukote	K. S. Puttannaiah	SKP	80,041	49.75	C. S. Puttaraju	JD(S)	70,193	43.63	9,848	6.12
Mandya	189	Mandya	M. H. Ambareesh	INC	90,329	59.11	M. Srinivas	JD(S)	47,392	31.01	42,937	28.10
Mandya	190	Shrirangapattana	A. B. Ramesha Bandisiddegowda	JD(S)	55,204	34.98	Ravindra Srikantaiah	IND	41,580	26.35	13,624	8.63
Mandya	191	Nagamangala	N. Chaluvarayaswamy	JD(S)	89,203	54.52	Suresh Gowdaa	INC	68,840	42.07	20,363	12.45
Mandya	192	Krishnarajpet	Narayanagowda	JD(S)	56,784	37.00	K. B. Chandrashekar	INC	47,541	30.97	9,243	6.03
Hassan	193	Shravanabelagola	C. N. Balakrishna	JD(S)	87,185	55.95	C. S. Puttegowda	INC	63,043	40.46	24,142	15.49
Hassan	194	Arsikere	K. M. Shivalinge Gowda	JD(S)	76,579	48.20	B. Shivaramu	INC	46,948	29.55	29,631	18.65
Hassan	195	Belur	Y. N. Rudresha Gowda	INC	48,802	36.71	K. S. Lingesha	JD(S)	41,273	31.05	7,529	5.66
Hassan	196	Hassan	H. S. Prakash	JD(S)	61,306	46.78	H. K. Mahesh	INC	57,110	43.58	4,196	3.20
Hassan	197	Holenarasipur	H. D. Revanna	JD(S)	92,713	57.14	S. G. Anupama	INC	62,655	38.61	30,058	18.53
Hassan	198	Arkalgud	A. Manju	INC	61,369	36.04	A. T. Ramaswamy	JD(S)	52,575	30.88	8,794	5.16
Hassan	199	Sakleshpur (SC)	H. K. Kumaraswamy	JD(S)	63,602	45.27	D. Mallesh	INC	30,533	21.73	33,069	23.54
Dakshina Kannada	200	Belthangady	K. Vasantha Bangera	INC	74,530	50.97	Ranjan G. Gowda	BJP	58,789	40.20	15,741	10.77
Dakshina Kannada	201	Moodabidri	K. Abhayachandra	INC	53,180	41.29	Umanatha Kotian	BJP	48,630	37.75	4,550	3.54
Dakshina Kannada	202	Mangalore City North	B. A. Mohiuddin Bava	INC	69,897	47.92	Krishna J. Palemar	BJP	64,524	44.24	5,373	3.68
Dakshina Kannada	203	Mangalore City South	J. R. Lobo	INC	67,829	51.26	N. Yogish Bhat	BJP	55,554	41.99	12,275	9.27
Dakshina Kannada	204	Mangalore	U. T. Khader	INC	69,450	55.59	Chandrahas Ullal	BJP	40,339	32.29	29,111	23.30
Dakshina Kannada	205	Bantval	B. Ramanatha Rai	INC	81,665	52.29	Rajesh Naik Ulipady	BJP	63,815	40.86	17,850	11.43
Dakshina Kannada	206	Puttur	Shakuntala T. Shetty	INC	66,345	46.46	Sanjeeva Matandoor	BJP	62,056	43.45	4,289	3.01
Dakshina Kannada	207	Sullia (SC)	S. Angara	BJP	65,913	45.13	B. Raghu	INC	64,540	44.19	1,373	0.94
Kodagu	208	Madikeri	Appachu Ranjan	BJP	56,696	36.85	B. A. Jivijaya	JD(S)	52,067	33.84	4,629	3.01
Kodagu	209	Virajpet	K. G. Bopaiah	BJP	67,250	47.23	Biddatanda T. Pradeep	INC	63,836	44.84	3,414	2.39
Mysore	210	Periyapatna	K. Venkatesh	INC	62,045	45.52	K. Mahadev	JD(S)	59,957	43.99	2,088	1.53
Mysore	211	Krishnarajanagara	Sa. Ra. Mahesh	JD(S)	81,457	51.73	Doddaswamegowda	INC	66,405	42.17	15,052	9.56
Mysore	212	Hunsur	H. P. Manjunath	INC	83,930	51.97	Kumaraswamy	JD(S)	43,723	27.07	40,207	24.90
Mysore	213	Heggadadevankote (ST)	S. Chikkamadu	JD(S)	48,606	32.64	Chikkanna	INC	36,108	24.25	12,498	8.39
Mysore	214	Nanjangud (SC)	Srinivasa Prasad	INC	50,784	36.01	Kalale N. Keshavamurthy	JD(S)	41,843	29.67	8,941	6.34
Mysore	215	Chamundeshwari	G. T. Devegowda	JD(S)	75,864	42.87	M. Sathyanarayana	INC	68,761	38.86	7,103	4.01
Mysore	216	Krishnaraja	M. K. Somashekar	INC	52,611	41.16	S. A. Ramadas	BJP	46,546	36.42	6,065	4.74
Mysore	217	Chamaraja	Vasu	INC	41,930	38.14	H. S. Shankaralinge Gowda	JD(S)	29,015	26.39	12,915	11.75
Mysore	218	Narasimharaja	Tanveer Sait	INC	38,037	32.86	K. H. Abdul Majid	SDPI	29,667	25.63	8,370	7.23
Mysore	219	Varuna	Siddaramaiah	INC	84,385	52.53	Kapu Siddalingaswamy	KJP	54,744	34.08	29,641	18.45
Mysore	220	T. Narasipur (SC)	H. C. Mahadevappa	INC	53,219	39.34	M. C. Sundareshan	JD(S)	52,896	39.10	323	0.24
Chamarajanagar	221	Hanur	R. Narendra	INC	55,684	40.39	Parimala Nagappa	JD(S)	44,135	32.02	11,549	8.37
Chamarajanagar	222	Kollegal (SC)	S. Jayanna	INC	47,402	32.36	N. Mahesh	BSP	37,209	25.40	10,193	6.96
Chamarajanagar	223	Chamarajanagar	C. Puttarangashetty	INC	54,440	37.09	K. R. Mallikarjunappa	KJP	43,244	29.47	11,196	7.62
Chamarajanagar	224	Gundlupet	H. S. Mahadeva Prasad	INC	73,723	45.42	C. S. Niranjan Kumar	KJP	66,048	40.69	7,675	4.73

Notes

Held later: Poll adjourned due to death of BJP candidate, Sannamogegowda.

Three candidates who failed to secure the Congress tickets were elected as independents: Santeesh Sail Krishna in Karwar, S N Subbareddy in Bagepalli, and G Manjunatha in Mulbagal.
Note2: Includes the result of Periyapatna assembly seat election held later

== Aftermath ==
Following the defeat, Chief Minister Jagadish Shettar submitted his resignation on 8 May. Governor H. R. Bharadwaj later appointed INC legislative leader Siddaramaiah as the next chief minister. The next election was held in May 2018.

== Bypolls (2013–2018) ==
#	Date	Constituency	MLA before election	Party before election	Elected MLA	Party after election
2	21 August 2014	Chikkodi-Sadalga (Note: Chikkodi-Sadalga by-election was necessitated because the sitting MLA, Prakash Hukkeri, was elected as a Member of Parliament (MP) to the Lok Sabha in the 2014 general elections. Ganesh Prakash Hukkeri (his son) subsequently won this by-poll to become the sitting MLA.)	Prakash Babanna Hukkeri	Indian National Congress	Ganesh Prakash Hukkeri	Indian National Congress
93	21 August 2014	Bellary Rural (Note: The Bellary Rural Assembly by-election held on August 21, 2014, occurred because B. Sriramulu vacated the seat after winning the Bellary Lok Sabha constituency in the 2014 general election.)	B. Sriramulu	Badavara Shramikara Raitara Congress	NY Gopalkrishna	Indian National Congress
115	21 August 2014	Shikaripura (Note: The Shikaripura assembly by-election, held on 21 August 2014, was necessitated by the resignation of MLA B. S. Yediyurappa after he won the Shimoga Lok Sabha seat in the May 2014 general elections. The resulting vacancy was filled by his son, B. Y. Raghavendra, who won the seat for the Bharatiya Janata Party (BJP).)	B. S. Yeddyurappa	Karnataka Janata Paksha	B. Y. Raghavendra	Bharatiya Janata Party
56	13 February 2016	Devadurga	Venkatesh Nayak	Indian National Congress	K. Shivana Gowda Nayaka	Bharatiya Janata Party
158	13 February 2016	Hebbal	R Jagadeesh Kumar	Indian National Congress	Y.A. Narayana Swamy	Bharatiya Janata Party
50	13 February 2016	Bidar	Gurupadappa Nagamarapalli	Bharatiya Janata Party	Rahim Khan	Indian National Congress
214	9 April 2017	Nanjangud	Srinivas Prasad	Indian National Congress	Kalale N. Keshavamurthy	Indian National Congress
224	9 April 2017	Gundlupet	H. S. Mahadeva Prasad	Indian National Congress	M.C. Mohan Kumari	Indian National Congress
