= Dasarahalli Assembly constituency =

Legislative Assembly constituency in Karnataka, India

Coordinates: 13.05°N 77.51°E

Dasarahalli
- Constituency No. 155 for the Karnataka Legislative Assembly

Constituency details
- Country: India
- Region: South India
- State: Karnataka
- District: Bangalore Urban
- Lok Sabha constituency: Bangalore North
- Established: 2002
- Total electors: 457,187 (2023)
- Reservation: None

Member of Legislative Assembly
- 16th Karnataka Legislative Assembly
- Incumbent S. Muniraju
- Party: Bharatiya Janata Party
- Elected year: 2023
- Preceded by: R. Manjunatha

Dasarahalli Assembly constituency is one of the 224 constituencies in the Karnataka Legislative Assembly of Karnataka, a southern state of India. It is also part of Bangalore North Lok Sabha constituency.

== Members of the Legislative Assembly ==
Election	Member	Party
2008	S. Muniraju	Bharatiya Janata Party
2013	S. Muniraju	Bharatiya Janata Party
2018	R. Manjunath	Janata Dal
2023	S. Muniraju	Bharatiya Janata Party

== Election results ==
=== Assembly Election 2023 ===
2023 Karnataka Legislative Assembly election : Dasarahalli
Party	Candidate	Votes	%	±%
BJP	S. Muniraju	91,289	39.75	▲1.20
JD(S)	R. Manjunath	82,095	35.75	▼7.73
INC	G. Dhananjaya	43,519	18.95	▲4.29
AAP	Kirthan Kumar Manjappa	4,486	1.95	New
UPP	Ashwath Kumar	3,365	1.47	New
NOTA	None of the above	2,179	0.95	▲0.02
Margin of victory		9,194	4.00	▼0.94
Turnout		229,765	50.26	▲2.18
Total valid votes		229,641		
Registered electors		457,187		▲1.61
BJP gain from JD(S)		Swing	▼3.73	

=== Assembly Election 2018 ===
2018 Karnataka Legislative Assembly election : Dasarahalli
Party	Candidate	Votes	%	±%
JD(S)	R. Manjunath	94,044	43.48	▲14.36
BJP	S. Muniraju	83,369	38.55	▼0.38
INC	P. N. Krishnamurthy	31,711	14.66	▼16.95
NOTA	None of the above	2,011	0.93	New
CPI(M)	N. Prathap Simha	1,674	0.77	New
Margin of victory		10,675	4.94	▼2.38
Turnout		216,316	48.08	▼7.46
Total valid votes		216,285		
Registered electors		449,950		▲30.56
JD(S) gain from BJP		Swing	▲4.55	

=== Assembly Election 2013 ===
2013 Karnataka Legislative Assembly election : Dasarahalli
Party	Candidate	Votes	%	±%
BJP	S. Muniraju	57,562	38.93	▼7.37
INC	B. L. Shankar	46,734	31.61	▲2.70
JD(S)	Andanappa. B	43,049	29.12	▲7.13
KJP	G. Mariswamy	18,238	12.34	New
Independent	Govindegowda. M. B	16,206	10.96	New
BSP	R. Gangadhar	1,422	0.96	▼0.02
BSRCP	Kemparaju. P. N	1,331	0.90	New
Independent	K. Muniraju	1,174	0.79	New
Independent	R. Manjunath	1,155	0.78	New
Margin of victory		10,828	7.32	▼10.06
Turnout		191,395	55.54	▲11.74
Total valid votes		147,849		
Registered electors		344,633		▲18.43
BJP hold		Swing	▼7.37	

=== Assembly Election 2008 ===
2008 Karnataka Legislative Assembly election : Dasarahalli
Party	Candidate	Votes	%	±%
BJP	S. Muniraju	59,004	46.30	New
INC	K. C. Ashoka	36,849	28.91	New
JD(S)	Andanappa. B	28,024	21.99	New
Independent	Shambhulinge Gowda	1,651	1.30	New
BSP	N. K. Naveen	1,255	0.98	New
Margin of victory		22,155	17.38	
Turnout		127,457	43.80	
Total valid votes		127,447		
Registered electors		290,998		
BJP win (new seat)				

== See also ==
- Bangalore Urban district
- List of constituencies of Karnataka Legislative Assembly
