= Indi Assembly constituency =

Constituency of the Karnataka legislative assembly in India

Coordinates: 17.17°N 75.96°E

Indi
- Constituency No. 32 for the Karnataka Legislative Assembly

Constituency details
- Country: India
- Region: South India
- State: Karnataka
- District: Bijapur
- Lok Sabha constituency: Bijapur
- Established: 1951
- Total electors: 242,910
- Reservation: None
- Preceded by: Yashavant Rayagoud Patil

Indi Assembly constituency is one of 224 assembly constituencies in Karnataka in India. It is part of Bijapur Lok Sabha constituency.

== Members of the Legislative Assembly ==
Election	Member	Party
1952	Mallappa Karabasappa Surpur	Indian National Congress
1952	Kabadi Jattappa Laxman	Indian National Congress
1957	Mallappa Karabasappa Surpur	Indian National Congress
1957	Kabadi Jattappa Laxman	Indian National Congress
1962	Gurulingappa Devappa Patil	Swatantra Party
1967	Mallappa Karbasappa Surpur	Swatantra Party
1972	Mallappa Karbasappa Surpur	Indian National Congress
1978	Kallur Revanasiddappa Ramegondappa	Janata Party
1983	Kallur Revanasiddappa Ramegondappa	Indian National Congress
1985	Khed Ningappa Siddappa	Janata Party
1989	Kallur Revanasiddappa Ramegondappa	Indian National Congress
1994	Ravikant Shankrppa Patil	Independent politician
1999	Ravikant Shankrppa Patil	Independent politician
2004	Ravikant Shankrppa Patil	Independent politician
2008	Dr. Bagali Sarvabhouma Satagoud	Bharatiya Janata Party
2013	Yashavant Rayagoud Patil	Indian National Congress
2018	Yashavant Rayagoud Patil	Indian National Congress
2023	Yashavant Rayagoud Patil	Indian National Congress

== Election results ==
=== Assembly Election 2023 ===
2023 Karnataka Legislative Assembly election : Indi
Party	Candidate	Votes	%	±%
INC	Yashavant Rayagoud Patil	71,785	39.69	▲9.71
JD(S)	B. D. Patil (Hanjagi)	61,456	33.98	▲9.91
BJP	Kasugouda Irappagouda Biradar	39,862	22.04	▼1.12
AAP	Gopal. R. Patil	3,353	1.85	New
NOTA	None of the above	886	0.49	▼0.25
Margin of victory		10,329	5.71	▼0.20
Turnout		181,640	74.78	▲2.31
Total valid votes		180,859		
Registered electors		242,910		▲4.66
INC hold		Swing	▲9.71	

=== Assembly Election 2018 ===
2018 Karnataka Legislative Assembly election : Indi
Party	Candidate	Votes	%	±%
INC	Yashavant Rayagoud Patil	50,401	29.98	▼15.65
JD(S)	B. D. Patil (Hanjagi)	40,463	24.07	▲6.02
BJP	Dayasagar Bapuraya Patil	38,941	23.16	▲10.86
Independent	Ravikant Shankrppa Patil	31,425	18.69	New
Independent	Sadashiva Girimalla Biradar	2,196	1.31	New
NOTA	None of the above	1,244	0.74	New
Margin of victory		9,938	5.91	▼20.04
Turnout		168,189	72.47	▲3.27
Total valid votes		168,111		
Registered electors		232,095		▲15.61
INC hold		Swing	▼15.65	

=== Assembly Election 2013 ===
2013 Karnataka Legislative Assembly election : Indi
Party	Candidate	Votes	%	±%
INC	Yashavant Rayagoud Patil	58,562	45.63	▲18.22
KJP	Ravikant Shankrppa Patil	25,260	19.68	New
JD(S)	Annappa Shivaningappa Khainur	23,173	18.05	▲9.30
BJP	Shrishailagouda Shankreppa Biradar	15,784	12.30	▼15.65
Independent	Dr. Bagali Sarvabhouma Satagoud	7,414	5.78	New
Independent	Subhashachandra Sunagar	1,264	0.98	New
BSRCP	Manjunath Shrishail Vandal	1,149	0.90	New
BSP	Tontapur Dharmanna Shivayogappa	1,087	0.85	▼6.59
Bharatiya Dr. B.R.Ambedkar Janta Party	Azroddin Hayachand Jahagiradar	912	0.71	New
Margin of victory		33,302	25.95	▲25.41
Turnout		138,924	69.20	▲8.35
Total valid votes		128,355		
Registered electors		200,765		▲15.90
INC gain from BJP		Swing	▲17.68	

=== Assembly Election 2008 ===
2008 Karnataka Legislative Assembly election : Indi
Party	Candidate	Votes	%	±%
BJP	Dr. Bagali Sarvabhouma Satagoud	29,456	27.95	▲11.91
INC	Yashvatraygouda Vithalgouda Patil	28,885	27.41	▼6.73
Independent	Ravikant Shankrppa Patil	21,276	20.19	New
JD(S)	M. R. Patil (Ballolli)	9,223	8.75	▲4.37
BSP	Mahadev Onkareppa Hirekurubar	7,840	7.44	New
Independent	Panchappa Sidramappa Kalburgi	4,517	4.29	New
Independent	Tambe Shrimanth Guraningappa	1,179	1.12	New
Independent	Bhimashankar Arjun Pujari	1,101	1.04	New
Independent	Melinkeri Sukhadev Mannappa	1,073	1.02	New
Margin of victory		571	0.54	▼8.93
Turnout		105,411	60.85	▲2.33
Total valid votes		105,385		
Registered electors		173,228		▲2.58
BJP gain from Independent		Swing	▼15.66	

=== Assembly Election 2004 ===
2004 Karnataka Legislative Assembly election : Indi
Party	Candidate	Votes	%	±%
Independent	Ravikant Shankrppa Patil	42,984	43.61	New
INC	Patil B. G.(halasangi)	33,652	34.14	▲4.84
BJP	Dr. Bagali Sarvabhouma Satagoud	15,807	16.04	▲7.75
JD(S)	Mallappa Kareppa Ukkali	4,321	4.38	▼0.96
Independent	Jitendra Ashok Kambale	921	0.93	New
Independent	Arab Mahiboob Abdulaganisab	880	0.89	New
Margin of victory		9,332	9.47	▼12.99
Turnout		98,817	58.52	▼2.50
Total valid votes		98,565		
Registered electors		168,873		▲13.09
Independent hold		Swing	▼8.15	

=== Assembly Election 1999 ===
1999 Karnataka Legislative Assembly election : Indi
Party	Candidate	Votes	%	±%
Independent	Ravikant Shankrppa Patil	44,523	51.76	New
INC	B. R. Patil (Anjutagi)	25,203	29.30	▲16.45
BJP	Ashok Neelanagouda Biradar	7,131	8.29	▼4.37
JD(S)	Mallappa Kareppa Ukkali	4,595	5.34	New
KRRS	Biradar Vital Yasavantray	2,129	2.48	▼2.47
BSP	Tontapur Dharmanna Shivayogappa	1,040	1.21	New
Independent	Hugar Sangappa Shivalingappa	1,036	1.20	New
Margin of victory		19,320	22.46	▲17.56
Turnout		91,115	61.02	▲1.57
Total valid votes		86,010		
Rejected ballots		5,066	5.56	▲3.09
Registered electors		149,322		▲13.79
Independent hold		Swing	▲21.27	

=== Assembly Election 1994 ===
1994 Karnataka Legislative Assembly election : Indi
Party	Candidate	Votes	%	±%
Independent	Ravikant Shankrppa Patil	23,200	30.49	New
JD	Patil Basagondappa Gurusiddappa	19,469	25.59	▼1.88
INC	Kallur Revanasiddappa Ramegondappa	9,779	12.85	▼27.61
BJP	Bagali Parmesvar Satagouda	9,632	12.66	▲11.34
INC	Choudri Bhimanappa Kalingappa	5,581	7.34	New
Independent	Khed Ningappa Siddappa	4,277	5.62	New
KRRS	Patil Baburao Apparao	3,767	4.95	New
Margin of victory		3,731	4.90	▼8.09
Turnout		78,009	59.45	▲1.22
Total valid votes		76,082		
Rejected ballots		1,927	2.47	▼3.12
Registered electors		131,227		▲7.49
Independent gain from INC		Swing	▼9.97	

=== Assembly Election 1989 ===
1989 Karnataka Legislative Assembly election : Indi
Party	Candidate	Votes	%	±%
INC	Kallur Revanasiddappa Ramegondappa	27,154	40.46	▼1.59
JD	Patil Basagondappa Gurusiddappa	18,438	27.47	New
JP	Patil Basanagouda Alias Dadagouda Babagouda	17,874	26.63	New
Kranti Sabha	Patil Baburao Apparao	2,648	3.95	New
BJP	Choudhari Gurulingappa Mallappa	883	1.32	▼0.56
Margin of victory		8,716	12.99	▲0.83
Turnout		71,089	58.23	▼3.45
Total valid votes		67,116		
Rejected ballots		3,973	5.59	▲3.68
Registered electors		122,087		▲31.95
INC gain from JP		Swing	▼13.75	

=== Assembly Election 1985 ===
1985 Karnataka Legislative Assembly election : Indi
Party	Candidate	Votes	%	±%
JP	Khed Ningappa Siddappa	30,349	54.21	▲36.88
INC	Patil Bhimanagouda Rayanagouda	23,541	42.05	▼8.76
BJP	Kannolli Jayasing Narasing	1,054	1.88	▼1.29
Independent	Koralli Gangadhar Shidaramappa	883	1.58	New
Margin of victory		6,808	12.16	▼15.28
Turnout		57,073	61.68	▲6.18
Total valid votes		55,981		
Rejected ballots		1,092	1.91	▼0.60
Registered electors		92,525		▲5.40
JP gain from INC		Swing	▲3.40	

=== Assembly Election 1983 ===
1983 Karnataka Legislative Assembly election : Indi
Party	Candidate	Votes	%	±%
INC	Kallur Revanasiddappa Ramegondappa	24,132	50.81	▲48.60
Independent	Patil Basanagouda Babanagouda	11,098	23.37	New
JP	Patil Shivanagouda Bheemanagouda	8,229	17.33	▼38.01
BJP	Choudhari Gurulingappa Mallappa	1,505	3.17	New
Independent	Mulla Nabisab Akabarasab	1,142	2.40	New
IC(S)	Patil Basavaraj Siddanagouda	922	1.94	New
Margin of victory		13,034	27.44	▲5.82
Turnout		48,719	55.50	▼4.63
Total valid votes		47,496		
Rejected ballots		1,223	2.51	▼0.80
Registered electors		87,781		▲8.54
INC gain from JP		Swing	▼4.53	

=== Assembly Election 1978 ===
1978 Karnataka Legislative Assembly election : Indi
Party	Candidate	Votes	%	±%
JP	Kallur Revanasiddappa Ramegondappa	26,022	55.34	New
INC(I)	Misale Siddaba Arjun	15,856	33.72	New
Independent	Turki Fakirahmed Mahemadsaheb	2,669	5.68	New
INC	Desai Dheerendra Behhmarao	1,040	2.21	▼47.43
Independent	Patil Malkangouda Ishwarappagouda	669	1.42	New
Independent	Koralli Gangadhar Shidaramappa	338	0.72	New
Margin of victory		10,166	21.62	▲13.04
Turnout		48,634	60.13	▲3.58
Total valid votes		47,024		
Rejected ballots		1,610	3.31	▲3.31
Registered electors		80,875		▲25.03
JP gain from INC		Swing	▲5.70	

=== Assembly Election 1972 ===
1972 Mysore State Legislative Assembly election : Indi
Party	Candidate	Votes	%	±%
INC	S. Mallappa Karbasappa	17,517	49.64	▲13.59
INC(O)	K. R. Ramagondappa	14,490	41.06	New
Independent	J. B. Ramacharya	1,372	3.89	New
Independent	H. S. Kasappa	1,203	3.41	New
ABJS	G. Gurappa Chanamallappa	707	2.00	New
Margin of victory		3,027	8.58	▼3.95
Turnout		36,577	56.55	▼5.90
Total valid votes		35,289		
Registered electors		64,685		▲16.42
INC gain from SWA		Swing	▲1.06	

=== Assembly Election 1967 ===
1967 Mysore State Legislative Assembly election : Indi
Party	Candidate	Votes	%	±%
SWA	S. Mallappa Karbasappa	15,769	48.58	▼2.53
INC	K. R. Ramagondappa	11,703	36.05	▼11.74
Independent	K. B. Aminoddin	4,989	15.37	New
Margin of victory		4,066	12.53	▲9.21
Turnout		34,696	62.45	▲2.34
Total valid votes		32,461		
Registered electors		55,562		▲10.86
SWA hold		Swing	▼2.53	

=== Assembly Election 1962 ===
1962 Mysore State Legislative Assembly election : Indi
Party	Candidate	Votes	%	±%
SWA	Gurulingappa Devappa Patil	14,624	51.11	New
INC	Mallappa Karabasappa Surpur	13,673	47.79	▼10.35
RPI	Lachappa Kallappa Sandimani	313	1.09	New
Margin of victory		951	3.32	▼6.23
Turnout		30,128	60.11	▲19.16
Total valid votes		28,610		
Registered electors		50,120		▼40.97
SWA gain from INC		Swing	▲17.99	

=== Assembly Election 1957 ===
1957 Mysore State Legislative Assembly election : Indi
Party	Candidate	Votes	%	±%
INC	Mallappa Karabasappa Surpur	23,033	33.12	▼39.89
INC	Kabadi Jattappa Laxman	17,402	25.02	▼47.99
Independent	Patil Yeshawanta Rao Annarao	16,390	23.57	New
SCF	Lachappa Kallappa Sandimani	6,586	9.47	▲2.89
Independent	Hujare Baburao Ramanna	6,133	8.82	New
Margin of victory		6,643	9.55	▼20.43
Turnout		69,544	40.95	▼37.39
Total valid votes		69,544		
Registered electors		84,910		▼19.79
INC hold		Swing	▼3.44	

=== Assembly Election 1952 ===
1952 Bombay State Legislative Assembly election : Indi Sindgi
Party	Candidate	Votes	%	±%
INC	Mallappa Karabasappa Surpur	30,322	36.56	New
INC	Kabadi Jattappa Laxman	30,231	36.45	New
SCF	Hujare Babu Rama	5,457	6.58	New
Independent	Kale Ravappa Somappa	4,536	5.47	New
MFB	Shirvalamath Marularadhy Shantveeraya	3,362	4.05	New
Independent	Janakar Sangappa Gangawa	3,037	3.66	New
Independent	Holer Yamanappa Parmann	2,775	3.35	New
Independent	Holer Dharmana Bhimanna	1,673	2.02	New
Independent	Birajdar Ishwarappa Dhulappa	1,545	1.86	New
Margin of victory		24,865	29.98	
Turnout		82,938	39.17	
Total valid votes		82,938		
Registered electors		105,865		
INC win (new seat)				

== See also ==
- List of constituencies of the Karnataka Legislative Assembly
