= Tarikere Assembly constituency =

Legislative Assembly constituency in Karnataka State, India

Coordinates: 13.71°N 75.81°E

Tarikere
- Constituency No. 126 for the Karnataka Legislative Assembly

Constituency details
- Country: India
- Region: South India
- State: Karnataka
- District: Chikmagalur
- Lok Sabha constituency: Udupi Chikmagalur
- Established: 1951
- Total electors: 193,745
- Reservation: None

Member of Legislative Assembly
- 16th Karnataka Legislative Assembly
- Incumbent G. H. Srinivasa
- Party: Indian National Congress
- Elected year: 2023
- Preceded by: D. S. Suresh

Tarikere Assembly constituency is one of the 224 Legislative Assembly constituencies of Karnataka in India.

It is part of Chikmagalur district. G. H. Srinivasa is the current MLA from Tarikere Assembly constituency.

== Members of the Legislative Assembly ==
| Election | Member | Party |
|---|---|---|
| 1952 | T. Nagappa | Kisan Mazdoor Praja Party |
| 1956 By-election (Note: Died in 1956) | T. C. Shantappa | Indian National Congress |
| 1957 | T. R. Parameshwaraiah | Indian National Congress |
| 1962 | T. R. Parameshwaraiah | Indian National Congress |
| 1967 | Hanji Shivanna | Praja Socialist Party |
| 1972 | Hanji Shivanna | Indian National Congress |
| 1978 | H. M. Mallikarjunappa | Indian National Congress |
| 1983 | H. R. Raju | Indian National Congress |
| 1985 | B. R. Neelakantappa | Janata Party |
| 1989 | H. R. Raju | Indian National Congress |
| 1994 | S. M. Nagaraju | Independent politician |
| 1999 | B. R. Neelakantappa | Indian National Congress |
| 2004 | T. H. Shivashankarappa | Indian National Congress |
| 2008 | D. S. Suresh | Bharatiya Janata Party |
| 2013 | G. H. Srinivasa | Indian National Congress |
| 2018 | D. S. Suresh | Bharatiya Janata Party |
| 2023 | G. H. Srinivasa | Indian National Congress |

== Election results ==
=== Assembly Election 2023 ===
2023 Karnataka Legislative Assembly election : Tarikere
| Party | Candidate | Votes | % | ±% |
|---|---|---|---|---|
| INC | G. H. Srinivasa | 63,086 | 40.93% | ▲27.29 |
| BJP | D. S. Suresh | 50,955 | 33.06% | ▲3.02 |
| Independent | H. M. Gopikrishna Hunasagatta | 35,468 | 23.01% | New |
| Independent | Doranal Paramesh | 1,338 | 0.87% | New |
| NOTA | None of the above | 736 | 0.48% | ▼0.03 |
| Margin of victory | | 12,131 | 7.87% | ▲0.06 |
| Turnout | | 155,575 | 80.30% | ▼1.54 |
| Total valid votes | | 154,149 | | |
| Registered electors | | 193,745 | | ▲5.92 |
| INC gain from BJP | | Swing | ▲10.89 | |

=== Assembly Election 2018 ===
2018 Karnataka Legislative Assembly election : Tarikere
| Party | Candidate | Votes | % | ±% |
|---|---|---|---|---|
| BJP | D. S. Suresh | 44,940 | 30.04% | ▲27.93 |
| Independent | G. H. Srinivasa | 33,253 | 22.23% | New |
| Independent | H. M. Gopikrishna Hunasagatta | 29,663 | 19.83% | New |
| INC | S. M. Nagaraju | 20,402 | 13.64% | ▼11.67 |
| JD(S) | T. H. Shivashankarappa | 14,574 | 9.74% | ▲3.79 |
| Republican Sena | Khaleel | 2,096 | 1.40% | New |
| KPJP | Akshay. L. B | 1,236 | 0.83% | New |
| NOTA | None of the above | 758 | 0.51% | New |
| Margin of victory | | 11,687 | 7.81% | ▲7.17 |
| Turnout | | 149,710 | 81.84% | ▲3.82 |
| Total valid votes | | 149,593 | | |
| Registered electors | | 182,919 | | ▲14.34 |
| BJP gain from INC | | Swing | ▲4.73 | |

=== Assembly Election 2013 ===
2013 Karnataka Legislative Assembly election : Tarikere
| Party | Candidate | Votes | % | ±% |
|---|---|---|---|---|
| INC | G. H. Srinivasa | 35,817 | 25.31% | ▼5.34 |
| KJP | D. S. Suresh | 34,918 | 24.67% | New |
| Independent | H. M. Gopikrishna Hunasagatta | 34,554 | 24.41% | New |
| JD(S) | T. R. Nagaraj | 8,421 | 5.95% | ▼9.17 |
| BJP | Avinash. T. J | 2,989 | 2.11% | ▼45.27 |
| SKP | Doranalu Suresh | 2,116 | 1.50% | New |
| Independent | Theerthappa | 978 | 0.69% | New |
| Samajwadi Janata Party (Karnataka) | T. S. Devaraju | 881 | 0.62% | New |
| Margin of victory | | 899 | 0.64% | ▼16.09 |
| Turnout | | 124,816 | 78.02% | ▲4.50 |
| Total valid votes | | 141,538 | | |
| Registered electors | | 159,984 | | ▲6.75 |
| INC gain from BJP | | Swing | ▼22.07 | |

=== Assembly Election 2008 ===
2008 Karnataka Legislative Assembly election : Tarikere
| Party | Candidate | Votes | % | ±% |
|---|---|---|---|---|
| BJP | D. S. Suresh | 52,167 | 47.38% | ▲21.43 |
| INC | T. H. Shivashankarappa | 33,748 | 30.65% | ▼13.59 |
| JD(S) | H. Omkarappa | 16,652 | 15.12% | ▼10.79 |
| BSP | K. Lingaraju | 2,151 | 1.95% | New |
| Independent | Shivashankar. Y. S | 1,415 | 1.29% | New |
| Swarna Yuga Party | A. S. Eswarappa | 1,005 | 0.91% | New |
| Margin of victory | | 18,419 | 16.73% | ▼1.56 |
| Turnout | | 110,187 | 73.52% | ▼1.18 |
| Total valid votes | | 110,096 | | |
| Registered electors | | 149,874 | | ▲3.73 |
| BJP gain from INC | | Swing | ▲3.14 | |

=== Assembly Election 2004 ===
2004 Karnataka Legislative Assembly election : Tarikere
| Party | Candidate | Votes | % | ±% |
|---|---|---|---|---|
| INC | T. H. Shivashankarappa | 47,593 | 44.24% | ▼4.18 |
| BJP | H. Omkarappa | 27,919 | 25.95% | New |
| JD(S) | S. M. Nagaraju | 27,876 | 25.91% | ▲6.14 |
| JP | A. S. Eswarappa | 1,849 | 1.72% | New |
| Independent | Rajkumara. A. B | 1,439 | 1.34% | New |
| Kannada Nadu Party | Dinesh. M. N | 898 | 0.83% | New |
| Margin of victory | | 19,674 | 18.29% | ▼4.42 |
| Turnout | | 107,926 | 74.70% | ▼1.39 |
| Total valid votes | | 107,574 | | |
| Registered electors | | 144,482 | | ▲5.91 |
| INC hold | | Swing | ▼4.18 | |

=== Assembly Election 1999 ===
1999 Karnataka Legislative Assembly election : Tarikere
| Party | Candidate | Votes | % | ±% |
|---|---|---|---|---|
| INC | B. R. Neelakantappa | 47,825 | 48.42% | ▲26.57 |
| JD(U) | S. M. Nagaraju | 25,390 | 25.70% | New |
| JD(S) | T. H. Shivashankarappa | 19,527 | 19.77% | New |
| BSP | T. R. Nagaraj | 5,320 | 5.39% | ▲4.33 |
| Independent | D. Chandya Naika | 715 | 0.72% | New |
| Margin of victory | | 22,435 | 22.71% | ▲22.13 |
| Turnout | | 103,796 | 76.09% | ▲1.47 |
| Total valid votes | | 98,777 | | |
| Rejected ballots | | 4,944 | 4.76% | ▲3.14 |
| Registered electors | | 136,420 | | ▲4.56 |
| INC gain from Independent | | Swing | ▲13.16 | |

=== Assembly Election 1994 ===
1994 Karnataka Legislative Assembly election : Tarikere
| Party | Candidate | Votes | % | ±% |
|---|---|---|---|---|
| Independent | S. M. Nagaraju | 33,769 | 35.26% | New |
| JD | B. R. Neelakantappa | 33,212 | 34.68% | ▲12.24 |
| INC | H. R. Raju | 20,929 | 21.85% | ▼22.94 |
| BJP | R. Devananda | 4,824 | 5.04% | ▲4.01 |
| BSP | T. S. Devaraju | 1,017 | 1.06% | New |
| KRRS | M. Maheswarappa (Mahesh) | 577 | 0.60% | New |
| Margin of victory | | 557 | 0.58% | ▼21.77 |
| Turnout | | 97,361 | 74.62% | ▲4.91 |
| Total valid votes | | 95,778 | | |
| Rejected ballots | | 1,573 | 1.62% | ▼5.76 |
| Registered electors | | 130,468 | | ▲2.21 |
| Independent gain from INC | | Swing | ▼9.53 | |

=== Assembly Election 1989 ===
1989 Karnataka Legislative Assembly election : Tarikere
| Party | Candidate | Votes | % | ±% |
|---|---|---|---|---|
| INC | H. R. Raju | 36,919 | 44.79% | ▼0.15 |
| JD | B. R. Neelakantappa | 18,496 | 22.44% | New |
| JP | T. H. Laxman | 18,236 | 22.12% | New |
| CPI | G. R. Vedamurthy | 4,780 | 5.80% | New |
| Independent | R. S. Palakshappa | 1,330 | 1.61% | New |
| Independent | Anjani | 1,240 | 1.50% | New |
| BJP | H. B. Srikantamurthy | 845 | 1.03% | New |
| Margin of victory | | 18,423 | 22.35% | ▲13.23 |
| Turnout | | 88,986 | 69.71% | ▼5.17 |
| Total valid votes | | 82,423 | | |
| Rejected ballots | | 6,563 | 7.38% | ▲5.86 |
| Registered electors | | 127,644 | | ▲26.77 |
| INC gain from JP | | Swing | ▼9.27 | |

=== Assembly Election 1985 ===
1985 Karnataka Legislative Assembly election : Tarikere
| Party | Candidate | Votes | % | ±% |
|---|---|---|---|---|
| JP | B. R. Neelakantappa | 40,137 | 54.06% | ▲18.97 |
| INC | S. M. Nagrajappa | 33,367 | 44.94% | ▼17.03 |
| IC(S) | Thimmappa | 619 | 0.83% | New |
| Margin of victory | | 6,770 | 9.12% | ▼17.76 |
| Turnout | | 75,395 | 74.88% | ▲1.79 |
| Total valid votes | | 74,248 | | |
| Rejected ballots | | 1,147 | 1.52% | ▼0.02 |
| Registered electors | | 100,691 | | ▲16.59 |
| JP gain from INC | | Swing | ▼7.91 | |

=== Assembly Election 1983 ===
1983 Karnataka Legislative Assembly election : Tarikere
| Party | Candidate | Votes | % | ±% |
|---|---|---|---|---|
| INC | H. R. Raju | 38,516 | 61.97% | ▲46.59 |
| JP | T. H. Shivashankarappa | 21,809 | 35.09% | ▼1.15 |
| Independent | Houepaksha Rangaswamy | 531 | 0.85% | New |
| Margin of victory | | 16,707 | 26.88% | ▲14.73 |
| Turnout | | 63,126 | 73.09% | ▼5.38 |
| Total valid votes | | 62,156 | | |
| Rejected ballots | | 970 | 1.54% | ▼0.49 |
| Registered electors | | 86,367 | | ▲7.03 |
| INC gain from INC(I) | | Swing | ▲13.58 | |

=== Assembly Election 1978 ===
1978 Karnataka Legislative Assembly election : Tarikere
| Party | Candidate | Votes | % | ±% |
|---|---|---|---|---|
| INC(I) | H. M. Mallikarjunappa | 30,016 | 48.39% | New |
| JP | H. R. Basavaraju | 22,478 | 36.24% | New |
| INC | D. L. Mallaiah | 9,538 | 15.38% | ▼20.57 |
| Margin of victory | | 7,538 | 12.15% | ▼0.26 |
| Turnout | | 63,318 | 78.47% | ▲12.69 |
| Total valid votes | | 62,032 | | |
| Rejected ballots | | 1,286 | 2.03% | ▲2.03 |
| Registered electors | | 80,691 | | ▲11.65 |
| INC(I) gain from INC | | Swing | ▲12.44 | |

=== Assembly Election 1972 ===
1972 Mysore State Legislative Assembly election : Tarikere
| Party | Candidate | Votes | % | ±% |
|---|---|---|---|---|
| INC | Hanji Shivanna | 16,628 | 35.95% | ▲2.18 |
| INC(O) | H. R. Basavaraju | 10,890 | 23.55% | New |
| Independent | H. M. Mallikarjunappa | 9,460 | 20.46% | New |
| Independent | K. R. Linghavappa | 8,681 | 18.77% | New |
| Independent | T. Rudrappa | 588 | 1.27% | New |
| Margin of victory | | 5,738 | 12.41% | ▼14.71 |
| Turnout | | 47,536 | 65.78% | ▼5.81 |
| Total valid votes | | 46,247 | | |
| Registered electors | | 72,269 | | ▲34.39 |
| INC gain from PSP | | Swing | ▼24.93 | |

=== Assembly Election 1967 ===
1967 Mysore State Legislative Assembly election : Tarikere
| Party | Candidate | Votes | % | ±% |
|---|---|---|---|---|
| PSP | H. Shivanna | 22,107 | 60.88% | ▲14.69 |
| INC | T. R. Parameshwaraiah | 12,261 | 33.77% | ▼13.36 |
| Independent | K. Siddachar | 1,942 | 5.35% | New |
| Margin of victory | | 9,846 | 27.12% | ▲26.18 |
| Turnout | | 38,499 | 71.59% | ▲6.60 |
| Total valid votes | | 36,310 | | |
| Registered electors | | 53,775 | | ▼15.26 |
| PSP gain from INC | | Swing | ▲13.75 | |

=== Assembly Election 1962 ===
1962 Mysore State Legislative Assembly election : Tarikere
| Party | Candidate | Votes | % | ±% |
|---|---|---|---|---|
| INC | T. R. Parameshwaraiah | 18,357 | 47.13% | ▼7.97 |
| PSP | Hanji Shivanna | 17,990 | 46.19% | New |
| Independent | Virupakshappa | 1,352 | 3.47% | New |
| ABJS | M. R. Ramaiah | 1,250 | 3.21% | New |
| Margin of victory | | 367 | 0.94% | ▼9.26 |
| Turnout | | 41,243 | 64.99% | ▲6.32 |
| Total valid votes | | 38,949 | | |
| Registered electors | | 63,458 | | ▲11.92 |
| INC hold | | Swing | ▼7.97 | |

=== Assembly Election 1957 ===
1957 Mysore State Legislative Assembly election : Tarikere
| Party | Candidate | Votes | % | ±% |
|---|---|---|---|---|
| INC | T. R. Parameshwaraiah | 18,328 | 55.10% | ▼1.87 |
| Independent | C. M. Chandrashekarappa | 14,936 | 44.90% | New |
| Margin of victory | | 3,392 | 10.20% | ▼3.73 |
| Turnout | | 33,264 | 58.67% | |
| Total valid votes | | 33,264 | | |
| Registered electors | | 56,701 | | |
| INC hold | | Swing | ▼1.87 | |

=== Assembly By-election 1956 ===
1956 Mysore State Legislative Assembly by-election : Tarikere
| Party | Candidate | Votes | % | ±% |
|---|---|---|---|---|
| INC | T. C. Shantappa | 14,464 | 56.97% | ▲24.96 |
| Independent | G. Marulappa | 10,926 | 43.03% | New |
| Margin of victory | | 3,538 | 13.93% | ▲13.79 |
| Total valid votes | | 25,390 | | |
| INC gain from KMPP | | Swing | ▲24.83 | |

=== Assembly Election 1952 ===
1952 Mysore State Legislative Assembly election : Tarikere
| Party | Candidate | Votes | % | ±% |
|---|---|---|---|---|
| KMPP | T. Nagappa | 8,093 | 32.14% | New |
| INC | T. C. Basappa | 8,059 | 32.01% | New |
| Independent | Chandrashekharappa | 6,239 | 24.78% | New |
| Independent | T. V. Narasingappa | 1,644 | 6.53% | New |
| Independent | Nadig Phaniyappa | 1,142 | 4.54% | New |
| Margin of victory | | 34 | 0.14% | |
| Turnout | | 25,177 | 65.19% | |
| Total valid votes | | 25,177 | | |
| Registered electors | | 38,619 | | |
| KMPP win (new seat) | | | | |

== See also ==
- List of constituencies of the Karnataka Legislative Assembly
- Chikmagalur district
