= Pavagada Assembly constituency =

Legislative Assembly constituency in Karnataka, India

Coordinates: 14.10°N 77.28°E

Pavagada
- Constituency No. 137 for the Karnataka Legislative Assembly

Constituency details
- Country: India
- Region: South India
- State: Karnataka
- District: Tumkur
- Lok Sabha constituency: Chitradurga
- Established: 1951 (first establishment); 1961 (second establishment)
- Total electors: 193,100 (2023)
- Reservation: None

Member of Legislative Assembly
- 16th Karnataka Legislative Assembly
- Incumbent H. V. Venkatesh
- Party: Indian National Congress
- Elected year: 2023
- Preceded by: Venkataramanappa

Pavagada Assembly constituency is one of the 224 constituencies in the Karnataka Legislative Assembly of Karnataka, a southern state of India. It is also part of Chitradurga Lok Sabha constituency.

== Members of the Legislative Assembly ==
Election	Member	Party
1952	C. T. Hanumanthiah	Indian National Congress
1952	Mali Mariyappa	Indian National Congress
1962	R. Kenchappa	Indian National Congress
1967	P. Anjanappa	Indian National Congress
1972	K. R. Thimmarayappa	Indian National Congress
1978	Nagappa	Indian National Congress
1983	Ugranarashimappa	Independent politician
1985	Somlanaika	Janata Party
1989	Venkataramanappa	Indian National Congress
1994	Somlanaika	Janata Dal
1999	Venkataramanappa	Indian National Congress
2004	K. R. Thimmarayappa	Janata Dal
2008	Venkataramanappa	Independent politician
2013	K. M. Thimmarayappa	Janata Dal
2018	Venkataramanappa	Indian National Congress
2023	H. V. Venkatesh	Indian National Congress

== Election results ==
=== Assembly Election 2023 ===
2023 Karnataka Legislative Assembly election : Pavagada
Party	Candidate	Votes	%	±%
INC	H. V. Venkatesh	83,062	49.62	▲4.83
JD(S)	K. M. Thimmarayappa	72,181	43.12	▼1.42
BJP	Krishna Naik	7,206	4.30	▼4.34
AAP	N. Ramanjinappa	1,831	1.09	New
NOTA	None of the above	614	0.37	▼0.12
Margin of victory		10,881	6.50	▲6.25
Turnout		168,107	87.06	▲4.45
Total valid votes		167,390		
Registered electors		193,100		▼2.10
INC hold		Swing	▲4.83	

=== Assembly Election 2018 ===
2018 Karnataka Legislative Assembly election : Pavagada
Party	Candidate	Votes	%	±%
INC	Venkataramanappa	72,974	44.79	▲1.46
JD(S)	K. M. Thimmarayappa	72,565	44.54	▼2.09
BJP	G. V. Balaram	14,074	8.64	▲5.02
NOTA	None of the above	794	0.49	New
Margin of victory		409	0.25	▼3.05
Turnout		162,955	82.61	▲4.49
Total valid votes		162,911		
Registered electors		197,250		▲5.95
INC gain from JD(S)		Swing	▼1.84	

=== Assembly Election 2013 ===
2013 Karnataka Legislative Assembly election : Pavagada
Party	Candidate	Votes	%	±%
JD(S)	K. M. Thimmarayappa	68,686	46.63	▲23.09
INC	H. V. Venkatesh	63,823	43.33	▲26.82
BJP	G. V. Vijayaraj	5,327	3.62	▼16.81
BSRCP	Ugranarashimappa	1,260	0.86	New
NCP	Sevenaik Shiva	1,236	0.84	New
KJP	Pavagada Sriram	1,229	0.83	New
Independent	Hanumantharaya. O	1,072	0.73	New
BSP	Nagarathnamma	1,045	0.71	▼0.44
Margin of victory		4,863	3.30	▼6.76
Turnout		145,426	78.12	▲5.02
Total valid votes		147,308		
Registered electors		186,168		▲4.96
JD(S) gain from Independent		Swing	▲13.03	

=== Assembly Election 2008 ===
2008 Karnataka Legislative Assembly election : Pavagada
Party	Candidate	Votes	%	±%
Independent	Venkataramanappa	43,562	33.60	New
JD(S)	K. M. Thimmarayappa	30,515	23.54	▼16.15
BJP	Somlanaika	26,484	20.43	▼2.31
INC	Dr. P. A. Gayatri Devi	21,397	16.51	▼17.14
Independent	S. G. Srinivasa	2,714	2.09	New
BSP	H. Sheshanandan	1,495	1.15	▼0.64
Independent	Thavarenaika	1,033	0.80	New
Independent	Modaletappa	841	0.65	New
Margin of victory		13,047	10.06	▲4.03
Turnout		129,659	73.10	▲0.44
Total valid votes		129,632		
Registered electors		177,365		▼3.75
Independent gain from JD(S)		Swing	▼6.09	

=== Assembly Election 2004 ===
2004 Karnataka Legislative Assembly election : Pavagada
Party	Candidate	Votes	%	±%
JD(S)	K. R. Thimmarayappa	53,136	39.69	▲30.46
INC	Venkataramanappa	45,058	33.65	▼19.77
BJP	Somlanaika	30,449	22.74	New
BSP	H. Subbaraya	2,402	1.79	▲0.93
Independent	Bamanjanappa	1,132	0.85	New
SP	Gantappa. T	942	0.70	New
Margin of victory		8,078	6.03	▼11.05
Turnout		133,896	72.66	▼3.37
Total valid votes		133,887		
Registered electors		184,269		▲10.53
JD(S) gain from INC		Swing	▼13.73	

=== Assembly Election 1999 ===
1999 Karnataka Legislative Assembly election : Pavagada
Party	Candidate	Votes	%	±%
INC	Venkataramanappa	65,999	53.42	▲16.57
JD(U)	Somlanaika	44,897	36.34	New
JD(S)	Ugranarashimappa	11,405	9.23	New
BSP	H. Subbaraya	1,063	0.86	New
Margin of victory		21,102	17.08	▲12.47
Turnout		126,750	76.03	▲1.58
Total valid votes		123,548		
Rejected ballots		3,175	2.50	▲0.49
Registered electors		166,716		▲7.90
INC gain from JD		Swing	▲11.96	

=== Assembly Election 1994 ===
1994 Karnataka Legislative Assembly election : Pavagada
Party	Candidate	Votes	%	±%
JD	Somlanaika	46,739	41.46	▲18.54
INC	Venkataramanappa	41,543	36.85	▼15.34
BJP	Krishna Naik	11,195	9.93	New
SP	Ugranarashimappa	9,664	8.57	New
INC	Thippeswamy	3,285	2.91	New
Margin of victory		5,196	4.61	▼23.71
Turnout		115,033	74.45	▲7.91
Total valid votes		112,722		
Rejected ballots		2,311	2.01	▼3.28
Registered electors		154,515		▲11.38
JD gain from INC		Swing	▼10.73	

=== Assembly Election 1989 ===
1989 Karnataka Legislative Assembly election : Pavagada
Party	Candidate	Votes	%	±%
INC	Venkataramanappa	45,626	52.19	▲14.07
JP	Thippeswamy	20,863	23.86	New
JD	Somlanaika	20,041	22.92	New
Margin of victory		24,763	28.32	▲13.33
Turnout		92,309	66.54	▼1.56
Total valid votes		87,428		
Rejected ballots		4,881	5.29	▲3.38
Registered electors		138,734		▲20.17
INC gain from JP		Swing	▼0.93	

=== Assembly Election 1985 ===
1985 Karnataka Legislative Assembly election : Pavagada
Party	Candidate	Votes	%	±%
JP	Somlanaika	40,964	53.12	▲51.94
INC	Ugranarashimappa	29,401	38.12	▲1.82
Independent	Doddananjaiah	1,992	2.58	New
Independent	G. S. Nagappa	1,685	2.18	New
Independent	Idagur Gangadhara	952	1.23	New
Independent	Thimmarayappa. K. R	805	1.04	New
Margin of victory		11,563	14.99	▼9.40
Turnout		78,620	68.10	▼0.46
Total valid votes		77,118		
Rejected ballots		1,502	1.91	▼0.18
Registered electors		115,444		▲11.26
JP gain from Independent		Swing	▼7.58	

=== Assembly Election 1983 ===
1983 Karnataka Legislative Assembly election : Pavagada
Party	Candidate	Votes	%	±%
Independent	Ugranarashimappa	42,274	60.70	New
INC	Krishnamurthy. K. B	25,285	36.30	▲24.26
JP	Nagappa	822	1.18	▼29.90
Margin of victory		16,989	24.39	▲7.32
Turnout		71,134	68.56	▼3.08
Total valid votes		69,647		
Rejected ballots		1,487	2.09	▼0.98
Registered electors		103,756		▲10.09
Independent gain from INC(I)		Swing	▲12.55	

=== Assembly Election 1978 ===
1978 Karnataka Legislative Assembly election : Pavagada
Party	Candidate	Votes	%	±%
INC(I)	Nagappa	31,511	48.15	New
JP	D. Anjanappa	20,341	31.08	New
INC	Ramappa	7,882	12.04	▼64.80
Independent	P. Anjanappa	3,573	5.46	New
Independent	L. Adinarayananaik	1,571	2.40	New
Independent	M. Anjanappa	567	0.87	New
Margin of victory		11,170	17.07	▼45.56
Turnout		67,518	71.64	▲28.71
Total valid votes		65,445		
Rejected ballots		2,073	3.07	▲3.07
Registered electors		94,246		▲15.67
INC(I) gain from INC		Swing	▼28.69	

=== Assembly Election 1972 ===
1972 Mysore State Legislative Assembly election : Pavagada
Party	Candidate	Votes	%	±%
INC	K. R. Thimmarayappa	26,245	76.84	▲23.36
Independent	P. Anajanappa	4,853	14.21	New
INC(O)	S. Anjaiah	1,308	3.83	New
Independent	Lakshmanika	1,170	3.43	New
Independent	R. Kenchappa	580	1.70	New
Margin of victory		21,392	62.63	▲53.13
Turnout		34,979	42.93	▼15.41
Total valid votes		34,156		
Registered electors		81,480		▲21.34
INC hold		Swing	▲23.36	

=== Assembly Election 1967 ===
1967 Mysore State Legislative Assembly election : Pavagada
Party	Candidate	Votes	%	±%
INC	P. Anjanappa	19,321	53.48	▼1.84
Independent	Ramappa	15,889	43.98	New
Independent	S. Anjaiah	916	2.54	New
Margin of victory		3,432	9.50	▼13.94
Turnout		39,176	58.34	▲14.66
Total valid votes		36,126		
Registered electors		67,150		▲15.15
INC hold		Swing	▼1.84	

=== Assembly Election 1962 ===
1962 Mysore State Legislative Assembly election : Pavagada
Party	Candidate	Votes	%	±%
INC	R. Kenchappa	12,976	55.32	▼5.83
PSP	N. B. Hanumantha Rayappa	7,478	31.88	New
ABJS	Hanumanthappa	2,066	8.81	New
Independent	P. Kadurappa	938	4.00	New
Margin of victory		5,498	23.44	▲2.92
Turnout		25,472	43.68	▼58.17
Total valid votes		23,458		
Registered electors		58,317		▼23.07
INC hold		Swing	▲23.81	

=== Assembly Election 1952 ===
1952 Mysore State Legislative Assembly election : Pavagada
Party	Candidate	Votes	%	±%
INC	C. T. Hanumanthiah	24,332	31.51	New
INC	Mali Mariyappa	22,883	29.64	New
KMPP	B. Narayana Naika	8,490	11.00	New
Socialist	P. R. Madhava Rao	8,105	10.50	New
KMPP	G. S. Subba Rao	7,144	9.25	New
Socialist	Anjinappa	6,255	8.10	New
Margin of victory		15,842	20.52	
Turnout		77,209	50.93	
Total valid votes		77,209		
Registered electors		75,804		
INC win (new seat)				

== See also ==
- List of constituencies of Karnataka Legislative Assembly
- Tumkur district
