= Yellapur Assembly constituency =

Legislative Assembly constituency in Karnataka State, India

Coordinates: 14.96°N 74.7°E

Yellapur
- Constituency No. 81 for the Karnataka Legislative Assembly

Constituency details
- Country: India
- Region: South India
- State: Karnataka
- District: Uttara Kannada
- Lok Sabha constituency: Uttara Kannada
- Established: 2008
- Total electors: 182,472
- Reservation: None

Member of Legislative Assembly
- 16th Karnataka Legislative Assembly
- Incumbent Arbail Shivaram Hebbar
- Party: Bharatiya Janata Party
- Elected year: 2023
- Preceded by: V. S. Patil

Yellapur Assembly constituency is one of the 224 Legislative Assembly constituencies of Karnataka in India.

It is part of Uttara Kannada district and Uttara Kannada Lok Sabha constituency. As of 2023, Arbail Shivaram Hebbar of the Bharatiya Janata Party is the representative of this constituency.

== Members of the Legislative Assembly ==
Election	Member	Party
2008	V. S. Patil	Bharatiya Janata Party
2013	Arbail Shivaram Hebbar	Indian National Congress
2018	Arbail Shivaram Hebbar	Indian National Congress
2019 By-election (Note: Disqualified by the Hon'ble Speaker under the 10th Schedule of the Constitution with effect from 25/07/2019)	Arbail Shivaram Hebbar	Bharatiya Janata Party
2023	Arbail Shivaram Hebbar	Bharatiya Janata Party

== Election results ==
=== Assembly Election 2023 ===
2023 Karnataka Legislative Assembly election : Yellapur
Party	Candidate	Votes	%	±%
BJP	Arbail Shivaram Hebbar	74,699	49.69%	▼11.19
INC	Andalagi Veerabhadragouda Shivanagoud Patil	70,695	47.02%	▲9.91
JD(S)	Nagesh Honnayya Naik	1,662	1.11%	▲0.18
NOTA	None of the above	1,457	0.97%	▼0.12
Margin of victory		4,004	2.66%	▼21.11
Turnout		150,514	82.49%	▲5.00
Total valid votes		150,338		
Registered electors		182,472		▲5.85
BJP hold		Swing	▼11.19	

=== Assembly By-election 2019 ===
2019 Karnataka Legislative Assembly by-election : Yellapur
Party	Candidate	Votes	%	±%
BJP	Arbail Shivaram Hebbar	80,442	60.88%	▲14.68
INC	Bhimanna Naik	49,034	37.11%	▼10.15
NOTA	None of the above	1,444	1.09%	▲0.08
JD(S)	A. Chaitra	1,235	0.93%	▼3.53
Margin of victory		31,408	23.77%	▲22.71
Turnout		133,581	77.49%	▼4.85
Total valid votes		132,139		
Registered electors		172,394		▲1.10
BJP gain from INC		Swing	▲13.62	

=== Assembly Election 2018 ===
2018 Karnataka Legislative Assembly election : Yellapur
Party	Candidate	Votes	%	±%
INC	Arbail Shivaram Hebbar	66,290	47.26%	▲7.08
BJP	Andalagi Veerabhadragouda Shivanagoud Patil	64,807	46.20%	▲22.98
JD(S)	Naik Ravindra. A	6,263	4.46%	▼11.03
NOTA	None of the above	1,421	1.01%	New
Margin of victory		1,483	1.06%	▼15.90
Turnout		140,398	82.34%	▲2.73
Total valid votes		140,271		
Registered electors		170,510		▲12.36
INC hold		Swing	▲7.08	

=== Assembly Election 2013 ===
2013 Karnataka Legislative Assembly election : Yellapur
Party	Candidate	Votes	%	±%
INC	Arbail Shivaram Hebbar	58,025	40.18%	▲5.10
BJP	Patil Veerabhadragouda Shivanagouda	33,533	23.22%	▼14.24
JD(S)	Anil Kumar. D	22,361	15.49%	▲0.15
KJP	Mahesh M. Hoskoppa	1,669	1.16%	New
Independent	Maruti Nagappa Karande	1,637	1.13%	New
Margin of victory		24,492	16.96%	▲14.58
Turnout		120,817	79.61%	▲3.98
Total valid votes		144,395		
Registered electors		151,757		▲9.86
INC gain from BJP		Swing	▲2.72	

=== Assembly Election 2008 ===
2008 Karnataka Legislative Assembly election : Yellapur
Party	Candidate	Votes	%	±%
BJP	V. S. Patil	39,109	37.46%	New
INC	Arbail Shivaram Hebbar	36,624	35.08%	New
JD(S)	Pramod Hegde	16,019	15.34%	New
BSP	Umesh Hegde Unchalli	3,278	3.14%	New
SP	Jaivanth Premanand Subraya	2,760	2.64%	New
Independent	Hanamantappa Guddappa Guddannanavar	2,759	2.64%	New
Independent	Suresh Ningappa Pujar	810	0.78%	New
Independent	G. D. Phakkirswamy	799	0.77%	New
Independent	S. Phakkeerappa	788	0.75%	New
Margin of victory		2,485	2.38%	
Turnout		104,476	75.63%	
Total valid votes		104,402		
Registered electors		138,132		
BJP win (new seat)				

== See also ==
- List of constituencies of the Karnataka Legislative Assembly
- Uttara Kannada district
