= Kampli Assembly constituency =

Legislative Assembly constituency in Karnataka State, India

Coordinates: 15.4°N 76.61°E

Kampli
- Constituency No. 91 for the Karnataka Legislative Assembly

Constituency details
- Country: India
- Region: South India
- State: Karnataka
- District: Ballari
- Lok Sabha constituency: Bellary
- Established: 2008
- Total electors: 214,473
- Reservation: ST

Member of Legislative Assembly
- 16th Karnataka Legislative Assembly
- Incumbent J. N. Ganesh
- Party: Indian National Congress
- Elected year: 2023
- Preceded by: T. H. Suresh Babu

Kampli Assembly constituency is one of the 224 Legislative Assembly constituencies of Karnataka in India.

It is part of Ballari district and is reserved for candidates belonging to the Scheduled Tribes.

== Members of the Legislative Assembly ==
Election	Member	Party
2008	T. H. Suresh Babu	Bharatiya Janata Party
2013	T. H. Suresh Babu	Badavara Shramikara Raitara Congress
2018	J. N. Ganesh	Indian National Congress
2023	J. N. Ganesh	Indian National Congress

== Election results ==
=== Assembly Election 2023 ===
2023 Karnataka Legislative Assembly election : Kampli
Party	Candidate	Votes	%	±%
INC	J. N. Ganesh	100,424	55.21%	▲6.59
BJP	T. H. Suresh Babu	76,333	41.97%	▼3.30
JD(S)	Raju Nayaka	1,374	0.76%	▼2.16
NOTA	None of the above	997	0.55%	▼0.73
Margin of victory		24,091	13.25%	▲9.90
Turnout		182,053	84.88%	▲6.85
Total valid votes		181,884		
Registered electors		214,473		▲0.77
INC hold		Swing	▲6.59	

=== Assembly Election 2018 ===
2018 Karnataka Legislative Assembly election : Kampli
Party	Candidate	Votes	%	±%
INC	J. N. Ganesh	80,592	48.62%	▲39.00
BJP	T. H. Suresh Babu	75,037	45.27%	▲43.75
JD(S)	K. Raghavendra	4,832	2.92%	▼1.18
NOTA	None of the above	2,125	1.28%	New
Pyramid Party of India	B. Shanthi Lakshmi	1,217	0.73%	New
CPI(M)	V. Shivashankrappa	1,111	0.67%	▼1.18
Margin of victory		5,555	3.35%	▼23.78
Turnout		166,088	78.03%	▲1.05
Total valid votes		165,760		
Registered electors		212,841		▲16.77
INC gain from BSRCP		Swing	▼7.27	

=== Assembly Election 2013 ===
2013 Karnataka Legislative Assembly election : Kampli
Party	Candidate	Votes	%	±%
BSRCP	T. H. Suresh Babu	70,858	55.89%	New
Independent	J. N. Ganesh	36,462	28.76%	New
INC	Gujjal Nagaraja	12,197	9.62%	▼22.80
KJP	Basavaraju. H. D	5,494	4.33%	New
JD(S)	S. Veeresh	5,199	4.10%	▼5.68
Independent	Parvatamma. H. L	3,223	2.54%	New
CPI(M)	Shivashankar Badanahatti	2,342	1.85%	New
BJP	B. Shivakumar	1,928	1.52%	▼49.44
Independent	B. Kariyappa Nayaka	1,788	1.41%	New
Margin of victory		34,396	27.13%	▲8.59
Turnout		140,305	76.98%	▲5.65
Total valid votes		126,777		
Registered electors		182,270		▲7.92
BSRCP gain from BJP		Swing	▲4.93	

=== Assembly Election 2008 ===
2008 Karnataka Legislative Assembly election : Kampli
Party	Candidate	Votes	%	±%
BJP	T. H. Suresh Babu	61,388	50.96%	New
INC	Sanna Hanumakka	39,052	32.42%	New
JD(S)	S. B. Marappa	11,780	9.78%	New
Independent	Dr. Shivamurthy. K. B	3,662	3.04%	New
JD(U)	Chakravarthi Nayaka. T	1,933	1.60%	New
Independent	Shymu	1,357	1.13%	New
Independent	Venkobanna Jambana Halli	1,302	1.08%	New
Margin of victory		22,336	18.54%	
Turnout		120,481	71.33%	
Total valid votes		120,474		
Registered electors		168,895		
BJP win (new seat)				

== See also ==
- List of constituencies of the Karnataka Legislative Assembly
- Ballari district
