= Hebbal Assembly constituency =

Constituency of the Karnataka legislative assembly in India

Coordinates: 13.04°N 77.60°E

Hebbal
- Constituency No. 158 for the Karnataka Legislative Assembly

Constituency details
- Country: India
- Region: South India
- State: Karnataka
- District: Bangalore Urban
- Lok Sabha constituency: Bangalore North
- Established: 2008
- Total electors: 288,971 (2023)
- Reservation: None

Member of Legislative Assembly
- 16th Karnataka Legislative Assembly
- Incumbent Byrathi Suresh
- Party: Indian National Congress
- Elected year: 2023
- Preceded by: Y. A. Narayanaswamy

Hebbal Assembly constituency is one of the assembly segments of Karnataka state. It is a part of Bangalore Urban district and comes under Bangalore North Lok Sabha constituency.

== Members of the Legislative Assembly ==
Election	Member	Party
2008	Katta Subramanya Naidu	Bharatiya Janata Party
2013	R. Jagadeesh Kumar	Bharatiya Janata Party
2016 By-election	Y. A. Narayanaswamy	Bharatiya Janata Party
2018	Byrathi Suresh	Indian National Congress
2023	Byrathi Suresh	Indian National Congress

== Election results ==
=== Assembly Election 2023 ===
2023 Karnataka Legislative Assembly election : Hebbal
Party	Candidate	Votes	%	±%
INC	Byrathi Suresh	91,838	57.71%	▲6.95
BJP	Jagdeesha Katta. K. S	61,084	38.39%	▲2.05
NOTA	None of the above	1,639	1.03%	▲0.04
JD(S)	Syed Mohid Altaf	1,604	1.01%	▼8.60
AAP	K. S. Manjunath Naidu	1,026	0.64%	New
Margin of victory		30,754	19.33%	▲4.92
Turnout		159,176	55.08%	▼0.21
Total valid votes		159,132		
Registered electors		288,971		▲8.92
INC hold		Swing	▲6.95	

=== Assembly Election 2018 ===
2018 Karnataka Legislative Assembly election : Hebbal
Party	Candidate	Votes	%	±%
INC	Byrathi Suresh	74,453	50.76%	▲12.50
BJP	Y. A. Narayanaswamy	53,313	36.34%	▼19.69
JD(S)	Hanumanthe Gowda	14,092	9.61%	▲6.21
NOTA	None of the above	1,450	0.99%	▲0.44
Margin of victory		21,140	14.41%	▼3.36
Turnout		146,690	55.29%	▲10.99
Total valid votes		146,690		
Registered electors		265,312		▲8.49
INC gain from BJP		Swing	▼5.27	

=== Assembly By-election 2016 ===
2016 Karnataka Legislative Assembly by-election : Hebbal
Party	Candidate	Votes	%	±%
BJP	Y. A. Narayanaswamy	60,367	56.03%	▲18.06
INC	C. K. Abdul Rahman Shartef	41,218	38.26%	▲5.40
JD(S)	Ismail Sharieff Nana	3,666	3.40%	▼21.55
NOTA	None of the above	596	0.55%	New
Margin of victory		19,149	17.77%	▲12.66
Turnout		108,337	44.30%	▼10.59
Total valid votes		107,741		
Registered electors		244,549		▲16.18
BJP hold		Swing	▲18.06	

=== Assembly Election 2013 ===
2013 Karnataka Legislative Assembly election : Hebbal
Party	Candidate	Votes	%	±%
BJP	R. Jagadeesh Kumar	38,162	37.97%	▼10.92
INC	C. K. Abdul Rahman Shartef	33,026	32.86%	▼10.85
JD(S)	Abdul Azeem	25,073	24.95%	▲20.61
LSP	Sridhar Pabbisetty	6,271	6.24%	New
KJP	C. Munikrishna	5,816	5.79%	New
SDPI	Fakruddin. S	1,473	1.47%	New
Independent	Shabeer Pasha	721	0.72%	New
Independent	Harish	721	0.72%	New
Margin of victory		5,136	5.11%	▼0.07
Turnout		115,542	54.89%	▲10.01
Total valid votes		100,501		
Registered electors		210,497		▼1.16
BJP hold		Swing	▼10.92	

=== Assembly Election 2008 ===
2008 Karnataka Legislative Assembly election : Hebbal
Party	Candidate	Votes	%	±%
BJP	Katta Subramanya Naidu	46,715	48.89%	New
INC	H. M. Revanna	41,763	43.71%	New
JD(S)	A. Lokesh Gowda	4,149	4.34%	New
BSP	G. M. Yousuf	596	0.62%	New
Margin of victory		4,952	5.18%	
Turnout		95,573	44.88%	
Total valid votes		95,548		
Registered electors		212,960		
BJP win (new seat)				
