= G. H. Srinivasa =

Indian politician (born 1967)

G. H. Srinivasa (born 1967) is an Indian politician from Karnataka. He is an MLA from Tarikere Assembly constituency in Chikmagalur district. He won the 2023 Karnataka Legislative Assembly election representing Indian National Congress.

== Early life and education ==
Srinivasa is from Tarikere, Chikmagalur district. His father's name is G. H. Nanjundappa. He completed his L.L.B. in 1988 from National Law College, Kuvempu University, Shimoga.

== Career ==
Srinivasa won from Tarikere Assembly constituency representing Indian National Congress in the 2023 Karnataka Legislative Assembly election. He polled 63,086 votes and defeated his nearest rival, D. S. Suresh of Bharatiya Janata Party, by a margin of 12,131 votes. Earlier, he became an MLA for the first time winning the 2013 Karnataka Legislative Assembly election but contested as an independent candidate and lost the 2018 Karnataka Legislative Assembly election.
