= K. Shivamurthy =

Indian politician

Member of Legislative Assembly
- Incumbent
- Assumed office 12 May 2013
- Chief Minister: Siddaramaiah
- Preceded by: M. Basavaraja Naika
- Constituency: Mayakonda

Personal details
- Born: Shivamurthy Kasina Naik; 17 June 1956 (age 70) Doddarangavvanahalli, Davangere
- Party: Indian National Congress (since 2013; 13 years ago)
- Spouse: Dr. Geetha
- Children: Suraj S. Naik & Lakshmi S. Naik
- Parent: Kasina Naik D.
- Relatives: P. R. Sudhakara Lal (Brother in law): Bangalore
- Education: Mysore University (B. A.); Bangalore University (L. L. B.).; Mysore University (M. B. A.).
- Profession: Politician, lawyer

Shivamurthy Kasina Naik better known by name K. Shivamurthy is the Member of the Legislative Assembly of Mayakonda, Davanagere district Karnataka, India. He was elected in the year 2013, defeating N. Linganna and succeeding M. Basavaraja Naika.
