= Mayakonda =

- village
- Location in Karnataka, India Mayakonda (India)
- Coordinates: 14°17′N 76°05′E
- Country: India
- State: Karnataka
- District: Davanagere
- Talukas: Davanagere

Population (2001)
  - Total: 5,723

Languages
  - Official: Kannada
- Time zone: UTC+5:30 (IST)

Mayakonda is a village in the southern state of Karnataka, India. It is in the Davanagere taluk of Davanagere district.

== Demographics ==
As of 2001 India census, Mayakonda had a population of 5723 with 2933 males and 2790 females.
