= Y. A. Narayanaswamy =

Indian politician

Y. A. Narayanasamy

Member of the Karnataka Legislative Council
- In office 22 June 2018 – 21 June 2024
- Preceded by: Ramesh Babu, Janata Dal (Secular)
- Succeeded by: D. T. Srinivas Yadav, INC
- Constituency: Karnataka South East Teachers
- In office 22 June 2006 – 17 February 2016
- Constituency: Karnataka South East Teachers

Member of the Karnataka Legislative Assembly for Hebbal
- In office 16 February 2016 – 15 May 2018
- Preceded by: R. Jagadeesh Kumar
- Succeeded by: Byrathi Suresh

Personal details
- Born: 22 December 1964 (age 61) Yachanahalli
- Party: Bharatiya Janata Party

Yachanahalli Adinarayanappa Narayanaswamy (born 13 May 1964) is an Indian politician belonging to the Bharatiya Janata Party. He was earlier elected as a member of Legislative Assembly from Hebbal after death of incumbent MLA Jagadish Kumar in 2016 bye election and later contested unsuccessfully from same seat in 2018.

Dr. Narayanaswamy was elected as MLC from Karnataka South- East Teachers’ constituency in 2018.
