= Yashavant Rayagoud Patil =

Indian politician

Yashavanta Rayagoud V Patil

Member of the Karnataka Legislative Assembly
- Incumbent
- Assumed office 8 May 2013
- Preceded by: Sarvabhouma Satagouda Bagali
- Constituency: Indi

Personal details
- Party: Indian National Congress

Yashavanta Rayagouda V Patil is an Indian politician and member of the Indian National Congress. He is a member of the Karnataka Legislative Assembly from the Indi in Vijayapura district.
