= H. V. Venkatesh =

Indian politician (born 1977)

H. V. Venkatesh (born 1977) is an Indian politician from Karnataka. He is an MLA from Pavagada Assembly constituency, which is reserved for SC community in Tumakuru district. He won the 2023 Karnataka Legislative Assembly election representing Indian National Congress.

== Early life and education ==
Venkatesh is from Pavagada, Tumakuru district. His father is Venkataramanappa. He did his B.A. and later completed LLB from Bangalore University.

== Career ==
Venkatesh won from Pavagada Assembly constituency representing Indian National Congress in the 2023 Karnataka Legislative Assembly election. He polled 83,062 votes and defeated his nearest rival, K. M. Thimmarayappa of Janata Dal (Secular), by a margin of 10,881 votes.
