= Vinisha Nero =

Indian politician (born 1968)

Member of the Karnataka Legislative Assembly
- In office 2013–2023
- Preceded by: Derrick M. B. Fullinfaw
- Succeeded by: Office abolished
- Constituency: Anglo-Indian reserved seat

Personal details
- Born: 9 February 1968 (age 58)
- Spouse: Lawrence Kenneth Nero

Vinisha Nero (born 9 February 1968) is an Indian politician from Karnataka. She is a former two time nominated Member of the Karnataka Legislative Assembly from the Anglo Indian community in 2014 and 2018.

== Early life and education ==
Nero is from Bengaluru, Karnataka. She did research on the Anglo Indian community and completed her MPhil in 2001. She started as a sociologist and later worked in the IT sector including in companies like Microsoft and Cisco, for nearly three decades before becoming an MLA. She also served as the secretary of the All India Anglo Indian Association.

== Political career ==
In 2002, when the then chief minister S. M. Krishna offered her to nominate as an MLA, she politely refused, but later she was encouraged by her husband Lawrence Kenneth Nero to accept the nomination. Nero became an MLA for the first time in 2013 when she was nominated by the Janata Dal (S)-Congress coalition under chief minister Siddaramaiah. She was renominated by the Kumaraswamy government in 2018.
