= Appaji M. J. =

Indian politician (1951–2020)

Member of the Karnataka Legislative Assembly
- In office 2013–2018

Member of the Karnataka Legislative Assembly
- In office 1999–2004

Member of the Karnataka Legislative Assembly
- In office 1994–1999

Personal details
- Born: 20 June 1951
- Died: 2 September 2020 (aged 69)
- Party: Janata Dal (Secular)
- Occupation: Politician

Appaji M. J. (20 June 1951 – 2 September 2020) was an Indian Politician from the state of Karnataka. He served as a three term member of the Karnataka Legislative Assembly.

M. J died from COVID-19 in September 2020. He died in the late evening at a hospital in Shivamogga. He had been experiencing a fever for two to three days and tested positive for COVID-19 after being admitted to the hospital.

== Constituency ==
He represented the Bhadravati constituency.

== Political Party ==
He won twice as an independent candidate and is associated with the Janata Dal (Secular) since 2008.
