= S. Muniraju =

Indian politician

Member of the Karnataka Legislative Assembly
- In office 2008–2018
- Preceded by: New constituency
- Succeeded by: R. Manjunath
- Constituency: Dasarahalli

Personal details
- Born: 16 July 1958 (age 68)
- Party: Bharatiya Janata Party
- Spouse: Sujata

S. Muniraju is an Indian politician from the state of Karnataka. He is a member of the Karnataka Legislative Assembly from Dasarhalli. He was elected as BJP president for Bangalore Urban District for a second consecutive term.

== Political Party ==
S. Muniraju's party is the Bharatiya Janata Party.
