= R. V. Devraj =

Indian politician (1957–2025)

Ronur Venkateshappa Devraj

KSRTC chairman
- In office 23 May 2000 – 28 October 2007
- Preceded by: Unknown
- Succeeded by: R Ashok

MLA Chamarajpet
- In office 12 December 2004 – 5 March 2008
- Chief Minister: S. M. Krishna

Personal details
- Born: 3 December 1957 Bangalore, Karnataka, India
- Died: 1 December 2025 (aged 67) Mysuru, Karnataka, India
- Party: Indian National Congress
- Education: Bangalore University
- Website: Official website

Ronur Venkateshappa Devraj (3 December 1957 – 1 December 2025) was an Indian politician who served as chairman of the Karnataka State Road Transport Corporation (KSRTC) from 2000 to October 2007. He was the general secretary of KPCC and Member of AICC. He served as MLA of Chamarajpet Constituency. After delimitation of Chamrajpete constituency, he became the Congress candidate for Chickpet.

Devraj was appointed Karnataka Slum Development Board chairman in 2016.

Devraj died from a cardiac arrest on 1 December 2025, at the age of 67.
