= H. S. Shivashankar =

Indian politician

Member of the Karnataka Legislative Assembly
- In office 2013–2018

Personal details
- Party: Janata Dal (Secular)
- Occupation: Politician

H. S. Shivashankar is an Indian politician from the state of Karnataka. He is a member of the Karnataka Legislative Assembly.

== Constituency ==
He represents the Harihar constituency.

== Political Party ==
He is from the Janata Dal (Secular).
