= J. N. Ganesh =

Indian politician

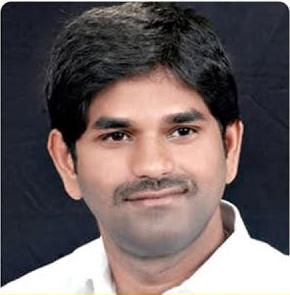

Member of Karnataka Legislative Assembly
- Incumbent
- Assumed office 2018
- Preceded by: T.H. Suresh Babu
- Constituency: Kampli

Personal details
- Born: Hosapete
- Party: Indian National Congress

J. N. Ganesh is an Indian politician from the state of Karnataka. He is the current MLA for Kampli representing Congress.

He was appointed chairman for Karnataka Handloom Development Corporation (KHDC) on 26 January 2024.

== Biography ==
Born to Corporator J.N. Venkobba in Hosur, Ballari, he grew up in a farmer's family. He completed 12th Boards and went to college. He started farming and became popular by helping people. He believed in simple living and was a righteous man. He is considered by some to be a hard working man who is respected by his community for his generous work towards farmers.

He joined Congress, his role model is sir Siddaramaiah and helped him to boost enrollment. In 2013, afterwards, Ganesh successfully sought a ticket from Congress for 2013 elections, and contested as an Independent. He lost to incumbent MLA T. H. Suresh Babu by 36,000 votes. In 2018, however, he won the Kampli seat, defeating Babu by 5000 votes on a Congress ticket.

== Controversies ==
J.N. Ganesh assaulted his fellow legislator Anand Singh at a resort in Bidadi on 20 January 2019 & Bidadi police had registered an FIR against him on 21 January 2019 for attempt to murder. The Congress had suspended him after the incident.
