= Karnataka Janata Paksha =

Karnataka Janata Paksha (KJP)
- Leader: B. S. Yediyurappa
- Founder: Padmanabha Prasanna Kumar
- Founded: 9 December 2012, Haveri
- Dissolved: 9 January 2014, Bengaluru
- Split from: Bharatiya Janata Party
- Merged into: Bharatiya Janata Party
- Headquarters: Number 11, Shanthi Nagar, Bengaluru - 560055, Karnataka
- Ideology: Social democracy
- Political position: Centre
- Colours: Green
- Alliance: National Democratic Alliance (NDA) (2013-2014)

Election symbol

Karnataka Janata Paksha (KJP) was an Indian political party based in Karnataka state. It was founded in 2012 and disestablished in 2014, merging with the Bharatiya Janta Party. It was headed by Karnataka Chief minister B. S. Yeddyurappa.

Yeddyurappa had resigned as a Member of Legislative Assembly and from the primary membership of the Bharatiya Janata Party (BJP) on 30 November 2012. The party was formally launched in a convention at Haveri on 9 December 2012, wherein thousands of people participated.

Scores of former and sitting legislators, ministers and senior functionaries of the BJP joined the party along with Yeddyurappa.

In the 2013 Karnataka Legislative Assembly Elections, the party under the leadership of Yeddyurappa won 6 of the 203 seats it had contested and secured about 10% of the total votes polled. Although, the party did not make any significant gains in the elections, it had restricted the BJP to just 40 seats, compared to the 110 it had in the outgoing assembly.

Though the KJP was formed as a splinter of the BJP, it did not profess Hindutva as its ideology and instead adopted a centrist social democratic stance with a secular outlook.

In September 2013, Yeddyurappa announced that the party would support the BJP-led National Democratic Alliance to ensure the victory of Narendra Modi.

== Electoral performance ==
Year	Seats won	Voteshare (%)
2013	6 / 224	9.8
