= 2023 Karnataka Legislative Assembly election =

Indian state election

- 10 May 2023

All 224 seats in the Karnataka Legislative Assembly 113 seats needed for a majority
- Opinion polls
- Registered: 53,131,579
- Turnout: 73.84% (▲1.34 pp)
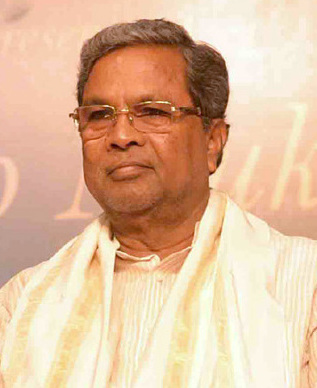

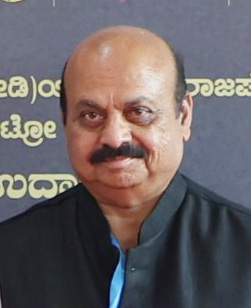

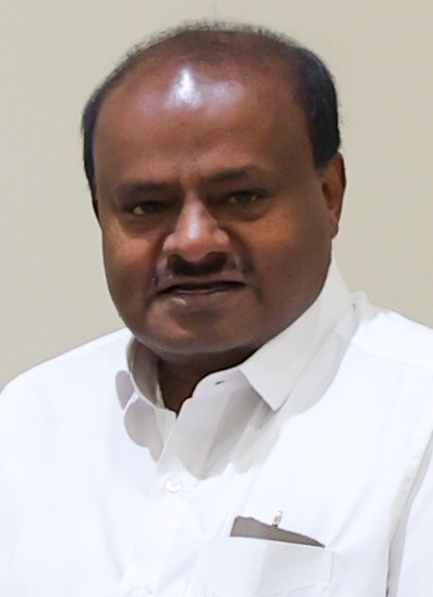
	Majority party	Minority party	Third party
Leader	Siddaramaiah	Basavaraj Bommai	H. D. Kumaraswamy
Party	INC	BJP	JD(S)
Leader since	2023	2021	2006
Leader's seat	Kanakapura	Shiggaon	Channapatna
Last election	38.14%, 80 seats	36.35%, 104 seats	18.3%, 37 seats
Seats won	135	66	19
Seat change	▲55	▼38	▼18
Popular vote	16,789,272	14,096,529	5,205,489
Percentage	42.88%	36.00%	13.29%
Swing	▲4.74 pp	▼0.35 pp	▼5.01 pp

- Structure of the Karnataka Legislative Assembly after the election
Chief Minister before election
Basavaraj Bommai
BJP
Elected Chief Minister
Siddaramaiah
INC

Legislative Assembly elections were held in Karnataka on 10 May 2023 to elect all 224 members of the Karnataka Legislative Assembly. The votes were counted and the results were declared on 13 May 2023.

The election saw a final voter turnout of 73.84%, the highest ever recorded in the history of Legislative Assembly elections in Karnataka.

The Indian National Congress won the election by landslide victory by getting 135 seats, making it their biggest win by seats and vote share in Karnataka since the 1989 elections. The Bharatiya Janata Party and the Janata Dal (Secular) conceded defeat, finishing second and third, respectively.

== Background ==
The tenure of the Karnataka Legislative Assembly ended on 24 May 2023. The previous assembly elections were held in May 2018. The Indian National Congress won the election in a landslide by getting 135 seats, making it their biggest win by seats and vote share in Karnataka since the 1989 elections.

=== Political developments ===
In July 2019, the coalition government collapsed due to resignations by several members of Congress and JD(S) in the assembly. Subsequently, Bharatiya Janata Party formed the state government, with B. S. Yediyurappa becoming Chief Minister.

On 26 July 2021, Yediyurappa resigned from the chief minister's post and Basavaraj Bommai was sworn in as the new chief minister on 28 July 2021.

==== Defections before polls ====
On 19 February 2023, BJP leader H.D. Thammaiah joined Congress along with his supporters. On 9 March 2023, BJP MLC Puttanna joined the Congress. Former Karnataka Chief Minister Jagadish Shettar quit BJP on 16 April 2023 and joined Congress the next day. Other leaders that left BJP before the polls included Laxman Savadi, M. P. Kumaraswamy and R. Shankar.

== Schedule ==
The schedule for the election was announced by the Election Commission of India on 29 March 2023. The Election Commission declared that the provisions of the Model Code of Conduct "came into force with immediate effect" with the announcement of schedule.

Event	Date	Day
Date of notification	13 April 2023	Thursday
Last date for filing nominations	20 April 2023	Thursday
Date for scrutiny of nominations	21 April 2023	Friday
Last date for withdrawal of candidatures	24 April 2023	Monday
Date of poll	10 May 2023	Wednesday
Date of counting	13 May 2023	Saturday

== Election statistics ==
=== Electorate ===
The total electorate in the state were 52,173,579 of which there were 26,200,000 men, 25,900,000 women and 4,699 transgender voters. 16,976 centenarians, 12.15 lakh voters over the age of 80 and 917,000 first-time voters were also included in the total. Moreover, 555,000 voters were physically challenged.

=== Polling stations ===
The Election Commission announced 58,282 polling stations for the election, out of which 24,063 were in urban areas and 34,219 in rural areas. The commission announced that to ensure enhanced voter participation, 1,320 polling stations were to be managed by women, 224 each by youth and disabled personnel. 130,000 vials of indelible ink were supplied by Mysore Paints and Varnish for the polls.

== Parties contested ==
=== National Democratic Alliance ===
National Democratic Alliance

Party	Flag	Symbol	Leader	Photo	Seats contested
Bharatiya Janata Party			Basavaraj Bommai		224

=== United Progressive Alliance ===
United Progressive Alliance

Party	Flag	Symbol	Leader	Photo	Seats contested
Indian National Congress			Siddaramaiah		223 (Note: Congress supported Sarvodaya Karnataka Party candidate Darshan Puttannaiah in Melukote constituency.)

=== Janata Dal (Secular) ===
Janata Dal (Secular)

Party	Flag	Symbol	Leader	Photo	Seats contested
Janata Dal (Secular)			H. D. Kumaraswamy		209 (Note: JD(S) supported CPI(M) candidate in Gulbarga Rural, Bagepalli and K. R. Puram constituencies; RPI candidate in Vijay Nagar, C. V. Raman Nagar and Mahadevapura constituencies; and Congress candidate in Nanjangud constituency. However, no RPI candidate contested from Vijay Nagar and Mahadevapura constituencies.)

=== Others ===
Party	Flag	Symbol	Leader	Seats contested
Aam Aadmi Party			Prithvi Reddy	209
Karnataka Rashtra Samithi			Ravi Krishna Reddy	195
Bahujan Samaj Party			M. Krishnamurthy	133
Uttama Prajaakeeya Party			Upendra	110
Kalyana Rajya Pragathi Paksha			G. Janardhana Reddy	46
Social Democratic Party of India			M. K. Faizy	16
Samajwadi Party			Shankar Bidari	14
Nationalist Congress Party			Hari R	9
Sarvodaya Karnataka Paksha			Darshan Puttannaiah	8
Communist Party of India			Sati Sundaresh	7 (Note: CPI supported Sarvodaya Karnataka Party candidate in Melukote constituency; CPI(M) candidate in Bagepalli constituency; and Congress candidates in the other 215 constituencies.)
Janata Dal (United)			Mahima patel	7
Communist Party of India (Marxist)			U. Basavaraj	4
All India Forward Bloc				3
Shiv Sena (Uddhav Balasaheb Thackeray)				3
National People's Party				2
All India Majlis-e-Ittehadul Muslimeen		kite		2
Communist Party of India (Marxist–Leninist) Liberation				2

== Candidates ==
JD(S) released the first list of 93 candidates on 19 December 2022 and the second list of 49 candidates on 14 April 2023. Another list of 6 candidates on 15 April. and candidate for Chamaraja was announced on 16 April. A list of 59 candidates was released on 19 April. On the same day, another list was released wherein candidates from 12 constituencies were replaced and support was given to other parties in 7 other constituencies. Final list of 13 candidates was released on 20 April.

Karnataka PCC released the first list of 124 candidates on 25 March 2023, the second list of 41 candidates on 6 April, leaving one seat for Sarvodaya Karnataka Party, the third list of 43 candidates on 15 April, the fourth list of 7 candidates on 18 April, the fifth list of 4 candidates (including replacement for Shiggaon constituency) on 19 April and the sixth and final list of 5 candidates on 20 April.

BJP Karnataka released the first list of 189 candidates on 11 April 2023, the second list of 23 candidates on 12 April, the third list of 10 candidates on 17 April the fourth and final list of 2 candidates on 19 April.

District	Constituency		BJP		INC		JD(S)	
District	#	Name	Party	Candidate	Party	Candidate	Party	Candidate
Belagavi	1	Nippani	BJP	Shashikala Annasaheb Jolle	INC	Kakasaheb Pandurang Patil	JD(S)	Raju Maruti Pawar
Belagavi	2	Chikkodi-Sadalga	BJP	Ramesh Katti	INC	Ganesh Prakash Hukkeri	JD(S)	Suhas Sadashiv Valke
Belagavi	3	Athani	BJP	Mahesh Kumathalli	INC	Laxman Savadi	JD(S)	Shashikanth Padasaligi Swamiji
Belagavi	4	Kagwad	BJP	Shrimant Patil	INC	Bharamgouda Alagouda Kage	JD(S)	Mallappa M Chunga
Belagavi	5	Kudachi (SC)	BJP	P. Rajeev	INC	Mahendra K. Thammannavar	JD(S)	Anand Gulagi
Belagavi	6	Raibag (SC)	BJP	Duryodhan Mahalingappa Aihole	INC	Mahaveer Mohith	JD(S)	Pradeep Malagi
Belagavi	7	Hukkeri	BJP	Nikhil Umesh Katti	INC	Appayyagouda Basagouda Patil	JD(S)	Basavaraja Gowda Patil
Belagavi	8	Arabhavi	BJP	Balachandra Jarkiholi	INC	Arvind Dalwai	JD(S)	Prakash Kash Shetty
Belagavi	9	Gokak	BJP	Ramesh Jarkiholi	INC	Mahantesh Kadadi	JD(S)	Channabasappa Balappa Giddannavar
Belagavi	10	Yemkanmardi (ST)	BJP	Basavaraj Hundri	INC	Sathish Jarkiholi	JD(S)	Maruti Mallappa Astagi
Belagavi	11	Belgaum Uttar	BJP	Ravi Patil	INC	Asif Sait	JD(S)	Sivananda Mugalihal
Belagavi	12	Belgaum Dakshin	BJP	Abhay Patil	INC	Prabhavathi Mastmardi	JD(S)	Srinivasa Gholkar
Belagavi	13	Belgaum Rural	BJP	Nagesh Manolkar	INC	Lakshmi Hebbalkar	JD(S)	Shankar Gowda Rudragowda Patil
Belagavi	14	Khanapur	BJP	Vithal Somanna Halagekar	INC	Anjali Nimbalkar	JD(S)	Naseer Bapulsab Bhagavan
Belagavi	15	Kittur	BJP	Mahantesh Doddagoudar	INC	Babasaheb D. Patil	JD(S)	Ashwini Singaiah Poojera
Belagavi	16	Bailhongal	BJP	Jagadish Metgud	INC	Koujalagi Mahantesh Shivanand	JD(S)	Shankar Madalagi
Belagavi	17	Saundatti Yellamma	BJP	Ratna Mamani	INC	Vishwas Vasant Vaidya	JD(S)	Sourabh Anand Chopra
Belagavi	18	Ramdurg	BJP	Chikka Revanna	INC	Ashok Mahadevappa Pattan	JD(S)	Prakash Mudhol
Bagalkot	19	Mudhol (SC)	BJP	Govind Karjol	INC	R. B. Timmapur	JD(S)	Dharmaraj Vithal Doddamani
Bagalkot	20	Terdal	BJP	Siddu Savadi	INC	Siddappa Ramappa Konnur	JD(S)	Suresh Arjuna Madiwala
Bagalkot	21	Jamkhandi	BJP	Jagadish Gudagunti	INC	Anand Siddu Nyamagouda	JD(S)	Yakoob Kapdewal
Bagalkot	22	Bilgi	BJP	Murugesh Nirani	INC	Jagadish Timmanagouda Patil	JD(S)	Rukmuddin Saudagar
Bagalkot	23	Badami	BJP	Shantha Gowda Patil	INC	Bhimsen Chimmanakatti	JD(S)	Hanumanthappa B. Mavinamarad
Bagalkot	24	Bagalkot	BJP	Veerabhadrayya Charantimath	INC	Hullappa Yamanappa Meti	JD(S)	Devaraj Patil
Bagalkot	25	Hungund	BJP	Doddanagouda G Patil	INC	Vijayanand Kashappanavar	JD(S)	Shivappa Bol
Vijayapura	26	Muddebihal	BJP	A. S. Patil	INC	C. S. Nadagouda	JD(S)	Channabasappa S. Sollapura
Vijayapura	27	Devar Hippargi	BJP	Somanagouda Patil	INC	Sharanappa T. Sunagar	JD(S)	Bhimanagouda Patil
Vijayapura	28	Basavana Bagevadi	BJP	S. K. Bellubbi	INC	Shivanand Patil	JD(S)	Somanagowda Patil
Vijayapura	29	Babaleshwar	BJP	Vijugouda Patil	INC	M. B. Patil	JD(S)	Basavaraj Honawada
Vijayapura	30	Bijapur City	BJP	Basangouda Patil Yatnal	INC	Abdul Hameed Mushrif	JD(S)	Bande Nawaz Mabari
Vijayapura	31	Nagathan (SC)	BJP	Sanjeev Aihole	INC	Vittal Katakadhond	JD(S)	Devananda P Chawhan
Vijayapura	32	Indi	BJP	Kasagouda Biradar	INC	Yashavanta Rayagoud V Patil	JD(S)	B.D. Patil
Vijayapura	33	Sindagi	BJP	Ramesh Bhusanur	INC	Ashok M. Managuli	JD(S)	Vishalakshi Shivanand
Kalaburagi	34	Afzalpur	BJP	Malikayya Guttedar	INC	M. Y. Patil	JD(S)	Shivakumar Natekar
Kalaburagi	35	Jevargi	BJP	Shivanna Gowda Patil Raddevadagi	INC	Ajay Singh	JD(S)	Doddappagouda Shivalingappa Gouda
Yadgir	36	Shorapur (ST)	BJP	Narasimha Nayak	INC	Raja Venkatappa Naik	JD(S)	Shravan Kumar Nayak
Yadgir	37	Shahapur	BJP	Ameenreddy Patil	INC	Sharanabassappa Darshanapur	JD(S)	Gurulingappa Gouda
Yadgir	38	Yadgir	BJP	Venkatreddy Mudnal	INC	Channareddy Patil Tunnur	JD(S)	A. B. Malaka Reddy
Yadgir	39	Gurmitkal	BJP	Lalitha Anapur	INC	Baburao Chinchansur	JD(S)	Sharanagouda Kandakur
Kalaburagi	40	Chittapur (SC)	BJP	Manikanta Rathod	INC	Priyank Kharge	JD(S)	Subhachandra Rathod
Kalaburagi	41	Sedam	BJP	Rajkumar Patil	INC	Sharan Prakash Patil	JD(S)	Balaraj Guttedar
Kalaburagi	42	Chincholi (SC)	BJP	Avinash Jadhav	INC	Subash V. Rathod	JD(S)	Sanjeev Yakapu
Kalaburagi	43	Gulbarga Rural (SC)	BJP	Basawaraj Mattimud	INC	Revu Naik Belamagi		
Kalaburagi	44	Gulbarga Dakshin	BJP	Dattatraya C. Patil Revoor	INC	Allamprabhu Patil	JD(S)	Krishna Reddy
Kalaburagi	45	Gulbarga Uttar	BJP	Chandrakanth Patil	INC	Kaneez Fathima	JD(S)	Nasir Hussain Ustad
Kalaburagi	46	Aland	BJP	Subhash Guttedar	INC	B. R. Patil	JD(S)	Sanjay Wadekar
Bidar	47	Basavakalyan	BJP	Sharanu Salagar	INC	Vijay Singh	JD(S)	S.Y. Quadri
Bidar	48	Humnabad	BJP	Siddu Patil	INC	Rajashekar Basavaraj Patil	JD(S)	C.M. Fayaz
Bidar	49	Bidar South	BJP	Shailendra Beldale	INC	Ashok Kheny	JD(S)	Bandeppa Kashempur
Bidar	50	Bidar	BJP	Eshwar Singh Thakur	INC	Rahim Khan	JD(S)	Suryakanta Nagamarapalli
Bidar	51	Bhalki	BJP	Prakash Khandre	INC	Eshwara Khandre	JD(S)	Rauf Patel
Bidar	52	Aurad (SC)	BJP	Prabhu Chauhan	INC	Shinde Bhimsen Rao	JD(S)	Jaisingh Rathod
Raichur	53	Raichur Rural (ST)	BJP	Thipparaja Hawaldar	INC	Basanagouda Daddal	JD(S)	Narasimha Nayak
Raichur	54	Raichur	BJP	Shivaraj Patil	INC	Mohammed Shalam	JD(S)	Vinay Kumar E
Raichur	55	Manvi (ST)	BJP	B. V. Nayak	INC	G. Hampayya Nayak	JD(S)	Raja Venkatappa Nayak
Raichur	56	Devadurga (ST)	BJP	K. Shivanagouda Naik	INC	Shreedevi R. Nayak	JD(S)	Karemma G. Nayak
Raichur	57	Lingsugur (SC)	BJP	Manappa D.Vajjal	INC	D. S. Hoolageri	JD(S)	Siddu Bandi
Raichur	58	Sindhanur	BJP	K Kariyappa	INC	Hampan Gowda Badarli	JD(S)	Venkatarao Nadagowda
Raichur	59	Maski (ST)	BJP	Pratapagouda Patil	INC	Basanagouda Turvihal	JD(S)	Sharanappa Kumbara
Koppal	60	Kushtagi	BJP	Doddanagouda Patil	INC	Amaregouda Bayyapur	JD(S)	Thukaram Survi
Koppal	61	Kanakagiri (SC)	BJP	Basavaraj Dadesaguru	INC	Shivaraj Sangappa Thangadagi	JD(S)	Ashok Ummalatti
Koppal	62	Gangawati	BJP	Paranna Munavalli	INC	Iqbal Ansari	JD(S)	H. R. Chennakeshava
Koppal	63	Yelburga	BJP	Halappa Achar	INC	Basavaraj Rayareddy	JD(S)	Konan Gowda
Koppal	64	Koppal	BJP	Manjula Amaresh	INC	K. Raghavendra Hitnal	JD(S)	Chandrasekhar
Gadag	65	Shirahatti (SC)	BJP	Chandru Lamani	INC	Sujatha N. Doddamani	JD(S)	Hanumanthappa Nayak
Gadag	66	Gadag	BJP	Anil Menasinakai	INC	H. K. Patil	JD(S)	Venkangouda Govind Goudar
Gadag	67	Ron	BJP	Kalakappa Bandi	INC	Gurupadagouda Patil	JD(S)	Mugadam Saab
Gadag	68	Nargund	BJP	C. C. Patil	INC	B. R. Yavagal	JD(S)	Rudra Gowda Patil
Dharwad	69	Navalgund	BJP	Shankar Patil Munenakoppa	INC	N.H. Konaraddi	JD(S)	Kallappa Gaddi
Dharwad	70	Kundgol	BJP	M. R. Patil	INC	Kusuma Shivalli	JD(S)	Ali Allasaab
Dharwad	71	Dharwad	BJP	Amrut Ayyappa Desai	INC	Vinay Kulkarni	JD(S)	Manjunath Hagedaar
Dharwad	72	Hubli-Dharwad East (SC)	BJP	Kranti Kiran	INC	Abbayya Prasad	JD(S)	Veerabhadrappa Halaharavi
Dharwad	73	Hubli-Dharwad Central	BJP	Mahesh Teginakai	INC	Jagadish Shettar	JD(S)	Siddalingeshgowda Odeyar
Dharwad	74	Hubli-Dharwad West	BJP	Arvind Bellad	INC	Deepak Chinchore	JD(S)	Gururaj Hunasimarad
Dharwad	75	Kalghatgi	BJP	Nagaraj Chabbi	INC	Santosh Lad	JD(S)	Veerappa Sheegehatti
Uttara Kannada	76	Haliyal	BJP	Sunil Hegde	INC	R. V. Deshpande	JD(S)	S.L. Kotnekar
Uttara Kannada	77	Karwar	BJP	Rupali Santosh Nayak	INC	Satish Krishna Sail	JD(S)	Chaitra Kotkar
Uttara Kannada	78	Kumta	BJP	Dinakar Shetty	INC	Nivedit Alva	JD(S)	Suraj Soni Nayak
Uttara Kannada	79	Bhatkal	BJP	Sunil Baliya Nayak	INC	M. S. Vaidya	JD(S)	Nagendra Naik
Uttara Kannada	80	Sirsi	BJP	Vishweshwar Hegde Kageri	INC	Bhimanna Naik	JD(S)	Upendra Pai
Uttara Kannada	81	Yellapur	BJP	Shivaram Hebbar	INC	V. S. Patil	JD(S)	Nagesh Naik
Haveri	82	Hangal	BJP	Shivaraj Sajjanar	INC	Srinivas Mane	JD(S)	Manohar Tahsildar
Haveri	83	Shiggaon	BJP	Basavaraj Bommai	INC	Yasir Ahmed Khan Pathan	JD(S)	Shashidar Channabasappa Yeligaar
Haveri	84	Haveri (SC)	BJP	Gavisiddappa Dyamannavar	INC	Rudrappa Lamani	JD(S)	Thukaram Malagi
Haveri	85	Byadgi	BJP	Virupakshappa Ballari	INC	Basavaraj N. Shivannanar		
Haveri	86	Hirekerur	BJP	B. C. Patil	INC	U. B. Banakar	JD(S)	Jayanand Javannanavar
Haveri	87	Ranebennur	BJP	Arunkumar Guththur	INC	Prakash K. Koliwad	JD(S)	Manjunath Goudar
Vijaynagara	88	Hoovina Hadagali (SC)	BJP	Krishna Naik	INC	P. T. Parameshwar Naik	JD(S)	Putresh
Vijaynagara	89	Hagaribommanahalli (SC)	BJP	B. Ramanna	INC	L. B. P. Bheema Naik	JD(S)	K. Nemiraj Naik
Vijaynagara	90	Vijayanagara	BJP	Siddharth Singh	INC	H. R. Gaviyappa		
Ballari	91	Kampli (ST)	BJP	T H Suresh Babu	INC	J. N. Ganesh	JD(S)	Raju Naik
Ballari	92	Siruguppa (ST)	BJP	M.S. Somalingappa	INC	B.M. Nagraj	JD(S)	Parameshwar Naik
Ballari	93	Bellary Rural (ST)	BJP	B. Sriramulu	INC	B. Nagendra		
Ballari	94	Bellary City	BJP	G. Somashekara Reddy	INC	Nara Bharath Reddy	JD(S)	Anil Lad
Ballari	95	Sandur (ST)	BJP	Shilpa Raghavendra	INC	E. Tukaram	JD(S)	Somappa
Vijaynagara	96	Kudligi (ST)	BJP	Lokesh V Nayaka	INC	N. T. Srinivas	JD(S)	Kodihalli Bhimappa
Chitradurga	97	Molakalmuru (ST)	BJP	S. Thippeswamy	INC	N. Y. Gopalakrishna	JD(S)	Mahadevappa
Chitradurga	98	Challakere (ST)	BJP	Anilkumar	INC	T. Raghumurthy	JD(S)	Raveesh
Chitradurga	99	Chitradurga	BJP	G. H. Thippareddy	INC	K C Veerendra	JD(S)	G. Raghu Achar
Chitradurga	100	Hiriyur	BJP	K. Poornima Srinivas	INC	D. Sudhakar	JD(S)	Ravindrappa
Chitradurga	101	Hosadurga	BJP	S. Lingamurthy	INC	B. G. Govindappa	JD(S)	M. Thippeswamy
Chitradurga	102	Holalkere (SC)	BJP	M. Chandrappa	INC	H. Anjaneya		
Devangere	103	Jagalur (ST)	BJP	S V Ramachandra	INC	B. Devendrappa	JD(S)	Deveraj
Vijayanagara	104	Harapanahalli	BJP	G. Karunakara Reddy	INC	N. Kotresh	JD(S)	N. M. Noor Ahmed
Devangere	105	Harihar	BJP	B.P. Harish	INC	Nandagavi Srinivas	JD(S)	H.S. Shivashankar
Devangere	106	Davanagere North	BJP	Lokikere Nagaraj	INC	S. S. Mallikarjun		
Devangere	107	Davanagere South	BJP	Ajay Kumar	INC	Shamanur Shivashankarappa	JD(S)	Amanulla Khan
Devangere	108	Mayakonda (SC)	BJP	Basavaraja Naik	INC	K.S. Basavaraju	JD(S)	Anandappa
Devangere	109	Channagiri	BJP	Shiv Kumar	INC	Basavaraju V Shivaganga	JD(S)	Tejaswi Patel
Devangere	110	Honnali	BJP	M. P. Renukacharya	INC	D.G. Shanthana Gowda	JD(S)	Shivamurthy Gowda
Shimoga	111	Shimoga Rural (SC)	BJP	Ashok Nayak	INC	Sreenivas Kariyanna	JD(S)	Sharada Purya Naik
Shimoga	112	Bhadravati	BJP	Mangoti Rudresh	INC	B. K. Sangameshwara	JD(S)	Sharada Appajigowda
Shimoga	113	Shimoga	BJP	S. N. Channabasappa	INC	H.C. Yogesh	JD(S)	Ayanur Manjunath
Shimoga	114	Tirthahalli	BJP	Araga Jnanendra	INC	Kimmane Rathnakar	JD(S)	Raja Ram
Shimoga	115	Shikaripura	BJP	B. Y. Vijayendra	INC	G.B. Malatesh		
Shimoga	116	Sorab	BJP	Kumar Bangarappa	INC	Madhu Bangarappa	JD(S)	Baasur Chandregowda
Shimoga	117	Sagar	BJP	Hartalu Halappa	INC	Belur Gopalkrishna	JD(S)	Zakir
Udupi	118	Byndoor	BJP	Gururaj Gantihole	INC	K Gopala Poojary	JD(S)	Mansoor Ibrahim
Udupi	119	Kundapura	BJP	Kiran Kumar Kodgi	INC	M. Dinesh Hegde	JD(S)	Ramesh Kundapura
Udupi	120	Udupi	BJP	Yashpal Suvarna	INC	Prasad Raj Kanchan	JD(S)	Dakshat R Shetty
Udupi	121	Kapu	BJP	Gurme Suresh Shetty	INC	Vinay Kumar Sorake	JD(S)	Sabina Samad
Udupi	122	Karkala	BJP	V. Sunil Kumar	INC	Uday Shetty	JD(S)	Srikanth Kochur
Chikmagalur	123	Sringeri	BJP	D. N. Jeevaraj	INC	T.D. Rajegowda	JD(S)	Sudhakar Shetty
Chikmagalur	124	Mudigere (SC)	BJP	Deepak Doddaiah	INC	Nayana Jyothi Jhawar	JD(S)	M.P. Kumaraswamy
Chikmagalur	125	Chikmagalur	BJP	C. T. Ravi	INC	H. D. Thammaiah	JD(S)	Thimmashetty
Chikmagalur	126	Tarikere	BJP	D. S. Suresh	INC	GH Srinivasa		
Chikmagalur	127	Kadur	BJP	K. S. Prakash	INC	K S Anand	JD(S)	YSV Datta
Tumakuru	128	Chiknayakanhalli	BJP	J. C. Madhuswamy	INC	Kiran Kumar	JD(S)	C.B. Surersh Babu
Tumakuru	129	Tiptur	BJP	B. C. Nagesh	INC	K. Shadakshari	JD(S)	Kantha Kumar
Tumakuru	130	Turuvekere	BJP	Masala Jayaram	INC	Kanthraj B.M.	JD(S)	M.T. Krishnappa
Tumakuru	131	Kunigal	BJP	D. Krishna Kumar	INC	H.D. Ranganath	JD(S)	D. Nagarajaiah
Tumakuru	132	Tumkur City	BJP	G. B. Jyothi Ganesh	INC	Iqbal Ahmed	JD(S)	Govindaraju
Tumakuru	133	Tumkur Rural	BJP	B. Suresh Gowda	INC	GH Shanumukkappa Yadav	JD(S)	D. C. Gourishankar
Tumakuru	134	Koratagere (SC)	BJP	B. H. Anil Kumar	INC	G. Parameshwara	JD(S)	Sudhakar Lal
Tumakuru	135	Gubbi	BJP	S. D. Dilip Kumar	INC	S. R. Srinivas	JD(S)	Nagaraja
Tumakuru	136	Sira	BJP	C. M. Rajesh Gowda	INC	T. B. Jayachandra	JD(S)	R. Ugresh
Tumakuru	137	Pavagada (SC)	BJP	Krishna Nayak	INC	H.V. Venkatesh	JD(S)	Thimmarayappa
Tumakuru	138	Madhugiri	BJP	L. C. Nagaraj	INC	Kyatasandra N. Rajanna	JD(S)	Veerabhadraiah
Chikkaballapura	139	Gauribidanur	BJP	Shashidhar	INC	N. H. Shivashankara Reddy	JD(S)	Narasimhamurthy
Chikkaballapura	140	Bagepalli	BJP	C Muniraju	INC	S.N. Subba Reddy		
Chikkaballapura	141	Chikkaballapur	BJP	K. Sudhakar	INC	Pradeep Eshwar Ayyar	JD(S)	K.P. Bachegowda
Chikkaballapura	142	Sidlaghatta	BJP	Ramachandra Gowda	INC	B V Rajeev Gowda	JD(S)	B. N. Ravikumar
Chikkaballapura	143	Chintamani	BJP	Venu Gopal	INC	M.C. Sudhakar	JD(S)	J. K. Krishna Reddy
Kolar	144	Srinivaspur	BJP	Gunjuru Srinivas Reddy	INC	K. R. Ramesh Kumar	JD(S)	G. K. Venkatashiva Reddy
Kolar	145	Mulbagal (SC)	BJP	Shigehalli Sundar	INC	Dr BC Muddugangadhar	JD(S)	Samruddi Manjunath
Kolar	146	Kolar Gold Field (SC)	BJP	Ashwini Sampangi	INC	Roopakala Shashidar	JD(S)	Ramesh Babu
Kolar	147	Bangarapet (SC)	BJP	M. Narayanswamy	INC	S. N. Narayanaswamy	JD(S)	M. Mallesh Babu
Kolar	148	Kolar	BJP	Varthur Prakash	INC	Kothur G. Manjunath	JD(S)	C. M. R. Srinath
Kolar	149	Malur	BJP	K S Manjunath Gowda	INC	K. Y. Nanjegowda	JD(S)	J. E. Ramegowda
Bangalore Urban	150	Yelahanka	BJP	S. R. Vishwanath	INC	Keshava Rajan B	JD(S)	M. Munegowda
Bangalore Urban	151	K. R. Puram	BJP	Byrati Basavaraj	INC	DK Moahan		
Bangalore Urban	152	Byatarayanapura	BJP	Thammesh Gowda	INC	Krishna Byre Gowda	JD(S)	Venugopal
Bangalore Urban	153	Yeshwantpur	BJP	S. T. Somashekhar	INC	S Balraj Gowda	JD(S)	Javarai Gowda
Bangalore Urban	154	Rajarajeshwarinagar	BJP	Munirathna Naidu	INC	Kusuma H.	JD(S)	Dr. Narayan Swami
Bangalore Urban	155	Dasarahalli	BJP	S. Muniraju	INC	Dhananjaya Gangadharaiah	JD(S)	I R. Manjunath
Bangalore Urban	156	Mahalakshmi Layout	BJP	K. Gopalaiah	INC	Keshava Murthy	JD(S)	Rajanna
Bangalore Urban	157	Malleshwaram	BJP	C. N. Ashwath Narayan	INC	Anoop Iyengar	JD(S)	Utkarsh
Bangalore Urban	158	Hebbal	BJP	Jagadish Katta	INC	Byrathi Suresh	JD(S)	Mohid Altaf
Bangalore Urban	159	Pulakeshinagar (SC)	BJP	Murali	INC	A. C. Srinivasa	JD(S)	Anuradha
Bangalore Urban	160	Sarvagnanagar	BJP	Padmanabha Reddy	INC	K. J. George	JD(S)	Mohammed Mushtaq
Bangalore Urban	161	C. V. Raman Nagar (SC)	BJP	S. Raghu	INC	S Anand Kumar		
Bangalore Urban	162	Shivajinagar	BJP	N. Chandra	INC	Rizwan Arshad	(Note: Nomination of JDS candidate Abdul Jafar Ali from Shivajinagar constituency was rejected.)	
Bangalore Urban	163	Shanti Nagar	BJP	Shiva Kumar	INC	Nalapad Ahmed Haris	JD(S)	Manjunath Gowda
Bangalore Urban	164	Gandhi Nagar	BJP	A. R. Sapthagiri Gowda	INC	Dinesh Gundu Rao	JD(S)	V Narayanaswamy
Bangalore Urban	165	Rajaji Nagar	BJP	S. Suresh Kumar	INC	Puttanna	JD(S)	Anjanappa
Bangalore Urban	166	Govindraj Nagar	BJP	Umesh Shetty	INC	Priya Krishna	JD(S)	R. Prakash
Bangalore Urban	167	Vijay Nagar	BJP	H. Raveendra	INC	M. Krishnappa		
Bangalore Urban	168	Chamrajpet	BJP	Bhaskar Rao	INC	B. Z. Zameer Ahmed Khan	JD(S)	Govindaraja
Bangalore Urban	169	Chickpet	BJP	Uday Garudachar	INC	R. V. Devaraju	JD(S)	Imran Pasha
Bangalore Urban	170	Basavanagudi	BJP	L. A. Ravi Subramanya	INC	U. B. Venkatesh	JD(S)	Aramane Shankar
Bangalore Urban	171	Padmanaba Nagar	BJP	R. Ashoka	INC	V. Raghunath Naidu	JD(S)	B. Manjunath
Bangalore Urban	172	B.T.M. Layout	BJP	Sridhar Reddy	INC	Ramalinga Reddy	JD(S)	Venkatesh
Bangalore Urban	173	Jayanagar	BJP	C. K. Ramamurthy	INC	Sowmya Reddy	JD(S)	Kale Gowda
Bangalore Urban	174	Mahadevapura (SC)	BJP	Manjula Aravind Limbavali	INC	Nagesh T.		
Bangalore Urban	175	Bommanahalli	BJP	Sathish Reddy	INC	Umapathy Srinivasa Gowda	JD(S)	Narayanaraju
Bangalore Urban	176	Bangalore South	BJP	M. Krishnappa	INC	R. K. Ramesh	JD(S)	Rajagopal Reddy
Bangalore Urban	177	Anekal (SC)	BJP	Hullalli Srinivas	INC	B. Shivanna	JD(S)	K. P. Raju
Bangalore Rural	178	Hoskote	BJP	M. T. B. Nagaraj	INC	Sharath Kumar Bache Gowda		
Bangalore Rural	179	Devanahalli (SC)	BJP	Pilla Munishamappa	INC	K. H. Muniyappa	JD(S)	Nisarga Narayanaswamy
Bangalore Rural	180	Doddaballapur	BJP	Dhiraj Muniraju	INC	T. Venkataramanaiah	JD(S)	Munegowda
Bangalore Rural	181	Nelamangala (SC)	BJP	Sapthagiri Naik	INC	N. Srinivasaiah	JD(S)	Srinivasamurthy
Ramanagara	182	Magadi	BJP	Prasad Gowda	INC	H. C. Balakrishna	JD(S)	A. Manjunath
Ramanagara	183	Ramanagara	BJP	Goutham Gowda	INC	Iqbal Hussain H. A.	JD(S)	Nikhil Kumaraswamy
Ramanagara	184	Kanakapura	BJP	R. Ashoka	INC	D. K. Shivakumar	JD(S)	Nagaraju
Ramanagara	185	Channapatna	BJP	C. P. Yogeshwara	INC	Gangadhar S.	JD(S)	H. D. Kumaraswamy
Mandya	186	Malavalli (SC)	BJP	G. Muniraju	INC	P. M. Narendra Swamy	JD(S)	K. Annadani
Mandya	187	Maddur	BJP	S. P. Swamy	INC	K. M. Uday	JD(S)	D. C. Thammanna
Mandya	188	Melukote	BJP	Indresh Kumar			JD(S)	C. S. Puttaraju
Mandya	189	Mandya	BJP	Ashok Jayaram	INC	Ravikumar Gowda	JD(S)	B. R. Ramachandra
Mandya	190	Shrirangapattana	BJP	Indavalu Sachidananda	INC	Ramesha Bandisiddegowda	JD(S)	Ravindra Srikantaiah
Mandya	191	Nagamangala	BJP	Sudha Shivaram	INC	N. Chaluvaraya Swamy	JD(S)	Suresh Gowda
Mandya	192	Krishnarajapet	BJP	Narayana Gowda	INC	B. L. Devaraj	JD(S)	H. T. Manjunath
Hassan	193	Shravanabelagola	BJP	Chidananda	INC	M. A. Gopalaswamy	JD(S)	C. N. Balakrishna
Hassan	194	Arsikere	BJP	G. V. Basavaraja	INC	K. M. Shivalinge Gowda	JD(S)	N. R. Santhosh
Hassan	195	Belur	BJP	H. K. Suresh	INC	B. Shivaram	JD(S)	K. S. Lingesh
Hassan	196	Hassan	BJP	Preetham Gowda	INC	Banavasi Rangaswamy	JD(S)	H. P. Swaroop
Hassan	197	Holenarasipur	BJP	Devaraje Gowda	INC	Shreyas M. Patel	JD(S)	H. D. Revanna
Hassan	198	Arkalgud	BJP	Yoga Ramesh	INC	H. P. Shridhar Gowda	JD(S)	A. Manju
Hassan	199	Sakleshpur (SC)	BJP	Cement Manju	INC	Murali Mohan	JD(S)	H. K. Kumaraswamy
Dakshina Kannada	200	Belthangady	BJP	Harish Poonja	INC	Rakshith Shivaram	JD(S)	Ashroff Ali
Dakshina Kannada	201	Moodabidri	BJP	Umanatha Kotian	INC	Mithun Rai	JD(S)	Amarashree
Dakshina Kannada	202	Mangalore City North	BJP	Y. Bharath Shetty	INC	Inayath Ali	JD(S)	Mohiuddin Bawa
Dakshina Kannada	203	Mangalore City South	BJP	Vedavyas Kamath	INC	John Richard Lobo	JD(S)	Sumati Hegde
Dakshina Kannada	204	Mangalore	BJP	Sathish Kumpala	INC	U. T. Khader		
Dakshina Kannada	205	Bantval	BJP	U. Rajesh Naik	INC	Ramanath Rai	JD(S)	Prakash Rafael Gomes
Dakshina Kannada	206	Puttur	BJP	Asha Thimmappa	INC	Ashok Kumar Rai	JD(S)	Divya Prabha
Dakshina Kannada	207	Sullia (SC)	BJP	Bhagirathi Murulya	INC	Krishnappa G.	JD(S)	Venkatesh H. N.
Kodagu	208	Madikeri	BJP	M. P Appachu Ranjan	INC	Mantar Gowda	JD(S)	M. N. Muthappa
Kodagu	209	Virajpet	BJP	K. G. Bopaiah	INC	A. S. Ponnanna	JD(S)	Mansoor Ali
Mysore	210	Periyapatna	BJP	C. H. Vijayashankar	INC	K. Venkatesh	JD(S)	K. Mahadev
Mysore	211	Krishnarajanagara	BJP	Venkatesh Hosalli	INC	D. Ravishankar	JD(S)	S. R. Mahesh
Mysore	212	Hunsur	BJP	Devarahalli Somashekhar	INC	H. P. Manjunath	JD(S)	Harish Gowda
Mysore	213	Heggadadevankote (ST)	BJP	Krishna Naik	INC	Anil Chikkamadhu	JD(S)	P. Jayaprakash
Mysore	214	Nanjangud (SC)	BJP	B. Harshavardhan	INC	Darshan Dhruvanarayana		
Mysore	215	Chamundeshwari	BJP	Kaveesh Gowda	INC	Mavinahalli S. Siddegowda	JD(S)	G. T. Devegowda
Mysore	216	Krishnaraja	BJP	T. S. Srivatsa	INC	M. K. Somashekar	JD(S)	K. V. Mallesh
Mysore	217	Chamaraja	BJP	L. Nagendra	INC	K. Harish Gowda	JD(S)	H. K. Ramesh
Mysore	218	Narasimharaja	BJP	Sandesh Swami	INC	Tanveer Sait	JD(S)	Abdul Kader Shahid
Mysore	219	Varuna	BJP	V. Somanna	INC	Siddaramaiah	JD(S)	Bharti Shankar
Mysore	220	T. Narasipur (SC)	BJP	M. Revanna	INC	H. C. Mahadevappa	JD(S)	Ashwinkumar
Chamarajanagar	221	Hanur	BJP	Preetham Nagappa	INC	R. Narendra	JD(S)	M. R. Manjunath
Chamarajanagar	222	Kollegal (SC)	BJP	N. Mahesh	INC	A. R. Krishnamurthy	JD(S)	Puttaswamy
Chamarajanagar	223	Chamarajanagar	BJP	V. Somanna	INC	C. Puttarangashetty	JD(S)	Mallikarjun Swamy
Chamarajanagar	224	Gundlupet	BJP	C. S. Niranjan Kumar	INC	H. M. Ganesh Parasad	JD(S)	Kadabur Manjunath

== Issues ==
=== Belagavi border dispute ===
Tensions concerning the Belagavi border dispute intensified in early December 2022 as a delegation of Maharashtra politicians proposed to travel to Belagavi district to demand the merger of some villages in Karnataka with Maharashtra, with politicians from Maharashtra making provocative statements. The border row escalated into violence after vehicles from both states were attacked and damaged in Belgavi and Pune in mid-December.

The issue has resurfaced ahead of assembly elections. Leader of the Opposition Siddaramaiah has demanded the resignation of Karnataka Chief Minister Basavaraj Bommai for failing in his duties to protect the state.

=== Corruption ===
In July 2021, D. Kempanna, president of the Karnataka State Contractors' Association wrote to Prime Minister Narendra Modi alleging large-scale corruption in the award and implementation of civil contracts in Karnataka. In the letter, he alleged that contractors were being forced to pay a 40% commission to officials at the BJP government, cutting across departments, for projects. Congress started a campaign PayCM to widely publicize these allegations.

Contractor Santhosh Patil (aged 40) who accused then-state cabinet minister K. S. Eshwarappa of harassing him for commissions committed suicide at Shambhavi Hotel in Udupi on 12 April 2022. He alleged that the BJP leader had been harassing him for commissions to clear the bills for contracts he had implemented for the government over a year ago. Eshwarappa had to resign as cabinet minister following the incident, and has retired from electoral politics.

Later in November 2024, the Karnataka Lokayukta cleared the BJP Karnataka unit of the 40% commission allegations, BJP leaders labelled Congress's allegations as false and claimed that they were a part of their election toolkit strategy. The state unit also said that the contractor who levied the allegations had not worked with the government for the past six years.

In August 2022, two associations representing 13,000 schools in Karnataka wrote to Prime Minister Narendra Modi accusing the Basavaraj Bommai-led BJP government of corruption. "Unscientific, irrational, discriminatory and noncompliance norms are applied to only unaided private schools and huge corruption is in place," the letter read. The school associations urged PM Modi to look into the allegations and launch an inquiry into the affairs of the Karnataka education ministry.

In order to "expose" the ruling BJP in Karnataka, the opposition Congress party has determined to make the Bitcoin scam an election issue in the 2023 elections.

When the merchandise was exported via Goa, depriving Karnataka of its tax revenue, the state exchequer lost roughly Rs 60 crore while the excise scam cost about Rs 200 crore, according to Priyank Kharge.

Congress party also released a 'corruption rate card' in English and Kannada languages, alleging the ruling BJP of looting ₹1,50,000 crore during last four years. The Election Commission issued a notice to Congress over these ads asked to provide evidence to support the claims.

=== Communal polarization ===
According to political analysts Phani Rajanna and Sandeep Shastri, with Karnataka polls nearing, the BJP is raking up more and more communal issues to divide people and polarise the votes. This has been shown by communal tensions started by right-wing Hindutva groups on use of hijab in government schools, sale of halal meat, broadcasting of azan on loudspeakers, a boycott of Muslim-run shops & Muslim employees similar to the Nazi boycott of Jewish businesses, moral policing specifically targeting Muslims and violence against Christians, which have been linked to the Bommai government. Bommai was widely perceived to be weak within the Karnataka BJP, due to which hardliners like Tejasvi Surya & B. L. Santhosh took over the reins of party administration.

The BJP has focused its campaign around these communal issues, drawing stark criticism from the opposition Congress, which accused it of neglecting governance issues.

=== Reservation controversy ===
Caste politics have once again risen to the forefront following the just completed elections in five states. The tone for the assembly elections the next year is being set by the regrouping of various caste lobbies in their fight for reservation. The Karnataka government has courted controversy with its orders to take away 4% OBC quota from low-caste Muslims and redistributing them to Lingayats and Vokkaligas. In addition the government has expressed support for internal reservation for Scheduled Castes into SC right, SC left and SC 'touchable' and SC other. Communities such as the Banjara have protested this move as depriving them of a share.

=== Farm laws ===
While various caste groups are working to make the controversial farm rules that the government passed two years ago the main topic for the forthcoming assembly elections, farmer organisations are getting ready to resurrect the issue.

=== Nandini vs Amul ===
In Karnataka, a war brewing between two major milk cooperatives in the country has spilled over into a political slugfest ahead of the Assembly elections in the state. The Amul vs Nandini row has created a stir in the state, with opposition mainly Congress leaders and pro-Kannada regionalist groups attacking the government for allowing the Gujarat-based Amul to sell fresh milk and curd in Bengaluru. The critics believe that entry of Amul in the fresh milk market could spell trouble for Karnataka's local brand, Nandini.

== Controversies ==
=== Remarks on 'Love jihad' ===
On 3 January 2023, BJP Karnataka state president Nalin Kumar Kateel in a party meet at Mangalore said that people should prioritise the issue of "Love jihad" over "road, gutter, drain and other small issues". His comments were criticised by Congress leaders and several state BJP leaders also expressed unhappiness over the remarks.

=== Remarks on dynastic politics by Amit Shah ===
On 26 April 2023, BJP top leader Amit Shah said, "If the Congress comes to power, dynastic politics will be at an all-time high and Karnataka will be afflicted with riots". In response, Indian National Congress filed a police complaint against Amit Shah for provocative statements and promoting enmity.

==== Supreme Court remarks on his speeches ====
On 9 May 2023, the Supreme Court termed Amit Shah's public speeches on scrapping of the 4 per cent quota for Muslims during the campaign in Karnataka when the matter was pending in the court, as "inappropriate" and alleged that the speeches amounted to "contempt of court proceedings".

=== Collection and sale of voter data ===
The Indian National Congress made allegations that Chilume Trust, an NGO in Bengaluru, had amassed voter personal data, including caste, age, gender, work and education information, Aadhaar cards, phone numbers and more. The Congress alleged that BJP assigned party workers through the NGO to collect such information, and names of legitimate voters of the opposition party were deleted and that names of 'fake voters' were added to ensure more votes for the BJP. The Congress also demanded resignation of Chief Minister over the matter.

In December 2022, the NGO was blacklisted by Bruhat Bengaluru Mahanagara Palike, Bengaluru's civic body, and a police complaint was filed against them for breach of trust. Subsequently, a probe was launched against the activities of the trust.

In April 2023, another company was found to be selling voter data of at least 6.5 lakh voters through an online portal. The Election Commission of India is investigating whether the data has been used for calling the voters and bribing them. An FIR has been lodged by Bengaluru Police against the online portal following a complaint made by an independent candidate who was approached by the seller.

BJP MLA C. N. Ashwath Narayan sent voters messages containing information (their names, voter ID card number, relatives' names and the booth address) from their voter ID cards on WhatsApp. This led to outrage among the voters questioning the legality of the practice and violation of their privacy.

=== Kharge remark on PM Modi ===
During an election campaign in Kalaburagi, Congress president and Rajya Sabha member from Karnataka Mallikarjun Kharge made a remark against PM Narendra Modi, calling him a 'poisonous snake'. Union Home Minister Amit Shah and Karnataka CM Basavaraj Bommai criticized the Congress leader and said that the comment will instead benefit BJP. BJP called it Congress's 'hate politics' and also demanded FIR against Congress leader.

=== Congress manifesto promise to ban Bajrang Dal ===
The Indian National Congress released its state manifesto, saying that it will put a ban on the right-wing Hindu nationalist militant organisation Bajrang Dal for spreading hatred and communalism if elected to power. In response, Bajrang Dal and BJP workers protested by chanting Hanuman Chalisa and burning Congress flags, and the Vishva Hindu Parishad issued a defamation notice to the Congress president Kharge.

=== Conspiracy to assassinate Kharge ===
Congress has claimed that BJP has been planning to assassinate Congress president Mallikarjun Kharge and his family. Congress released an alleged audio clip on 6 May 2023 in which Manikanta Rathod, BJP candidate from Chittapur, could be heard abusing Kharge and talking about eliminating him and his family.

=== Questions on fairness of Election Commission ===
The Election Commission ignored the complaints by the Congress party on various statements by BJP leaders which lead to allegations of the EC being biased and favouring the BJP.

The Election commission asked Congress to provide evidence behind their newspaper advertisements claiming specific allegations of corruption by the BJP's Karnataka government and also issued a notice for Sonia Gandhi's alleged mention of the word "sovereignty" in a public speech. However no action was taken by the Election Commission on complaints raised by Congress against the Prime Minister Narendra Modi for allegedly invoking Hindu gods in his rallies and alleging Congress of a terror conspiracy.

=== Sonia Gandhi speech ===
Referring to Congress leader Sonia Gandhi's speech, Prime Minister Modi had alleged Congress of "openly advocating" Karnataka's secession from the Indian Union, called for an FIR against her and sought derecognition of the Congress party by the Election Commission. However, Sonia did not use the word "sovereignty" or its Hindi translation "samprabhuta" in her speech, but the word was instead mentioned in a tweet by the Congress.

In response, the Congress submitted a breach of privilege notice in Lok Sabha against PM Modi for the alleged "misrepresentation" of Sonia's speech.

== Campaigns ==
=== Bharatiya Janata Party ===
Karnataka chief minister Basavaraj Bommai and former chief minister B. S. Yediyurappa started the "Jana Sankalpa Yatra" for the Bharatiya Janata Party on 11 October 2022, coinciding with the Bharat Jodo Yatra of Congress's Rahul Gandhi in the state. The yatra would cover 52 assembly constituencies.

BJP's campaign was centred around the prime minister Narendra Modi, who addressed 19 public rallies and 6 roadshows in the state, the schemes of the Central government and how the government in the state would make collaboration easy with the center. BJP did not announce a Chief Minister candidate and did not project a local leader as a face of the campaign. The party banked on Hindutva to divide voters along the communal lines before the polls when it was in the power in the state. It campaigned on issues like banning hijab in government schools, scrapping of 4% reservation quota for low-caste Muslims, twisting historical facts around Tipu Sultan, ban on cattle slaughter etc. In most of the election campaigning, the party put Hindutva to the back possibly due to their realization that the religious polarisation was not working.

In the last days of campaigning period, Prime Minister Modi conducted road rallies, ignoring major issues in the country such as large scale unrest in Manipur, terror attack in Jammu and Kashmir and wrestlers' protests against MP of his party. Modi also referenced the controversial film The Kerala Story as "a new face of terrorism" even after the Kerala High court acknowledged the movie is not based on real events. His rallies were marked with slogans of 'Jai Bajrang Bali' after Congress pledged to ban organisations that spread hatred and named Bajrang Dal in their manifesto. The campaign attempted to equate Bajrang Dal with Bajrang Bali (Lord Hanuman) while Congress maintained the two are different. Many commuters found themselves stranded in traffic caused by blocking of roads due to the roadshows.

==== Manifesto ====
BJP announced their manifesto on 1 May 2023.

The manifesto was divided into six sections- Anna (food security), Abhaya (social welfare), Akshara (education), Aarogya (health), Abhivrudhhi (development) and Aadaaya (income).

Some highlights of BJP manifesto are:

- Implementation of the Uniform Civil Code (UCC)
- Introduction of NRC
- Three free cooking gas cylinders to all BPL families
- Half litre of Nandini milk every day to BPL families
- Forming Atal Aahara Kendras for "affordable, quality and hygienic food"
- Monthly free 5 kg millet and 5 kg wheat

=== Indian National Congress ===
The Indian National Congress campaign was marked by allegations of corruption by the BJP government in the state, putting the BJP on the defensive. The five guarantees and the groundwork ensured outreach of the party among the voters, finding resonance especially among women who outnumber male voters in about 50% of the seats. The party deployed local-level leaders Siddaramaiah, DK Shivakumar, Parameshwar, MB Patil, UT Khader, KJ George and the AICC President Mallikarjun Kharge. Congress also took risk by mentioning ban of Bajrang Dal in its manifesto hoping to consolidate minority votes which could potentially go to JDS, a move which gave BJP some fuel in last few days of campaigning.

The Indian National Congress kickstarted its campaign with the entry of the Bharat Jodo Yatra in Karnataka on 30 September 2022. The yatra had huge crowds throughout the state, galvanising the party cadre and increasing morale of party workers, according to political experts. Police started cracking down on Congress's PayCM campaign against the alleged corruption in the Bommai ministry upon the entry of the Bharat Jodo Yatra. In the yatra, Rahul Gandhi stressed issues such as the handling of the COVID-19 pandemic by the state BJP government and the importance of regional languages, especially Kannada.

In September 2022, the Congress set up QR codes of "PayCM" in many parts of Bengaluru. These posters had Karnataka CM Basavaraj Bommai's dotted face with the caption "40% Accepted Here...Scan this QR code to make CM PAY for Corruption" as a knockoff of the QR code of Paytm. These posters referred to the allegations that Bommai's BJP government took bribes in awarding public contracts and recruitments. These QR codes took scanners to a website people could report corruption and make complains at a designated website.

A 10-point platform for the Coastal region was released by the Congress Party for the Assembly elections. It focuses on generating employment, luring capital, growing tourism, and fostering social peace.

==== Manifesto ====
On 2 May 2023, Congress released its manifesto and named it Sarva Janangada Shanthiya Thota (Peaceful garden of all communities).

Some of the main promises made in the Congress manifesto are:

- Investment of ₹1.5 lakh crore for the completion of pending irrigation projects
- Investment of ₹1.5 lakh crore in agriculture
- ₹50,000 crore investment in village infrastructure
- Providing free bus rides for all women and girls (known as the, "Uchita Prayāna" scheme).
- Providing ₹3000 allowance for every unemployed youth with graduation degree and ₹1500 allowance for diploma holders all over the state (known as, "Yuva nidhi" scheme).
- Reimplementation of the Old Pension Scheme, which it did in Rajasthan, Chhattisgarh and Himachal pradesh.
- Increase of reservation for SC/ST/OBC from 50% to 75%
- Restoration of 4% Muslim quota, over and above their OBC quota which was removed by the BJP
- ₹2,000 a month to the female head of families (known as, "Gruha Lakshmi" scheme).
- 200 units of electricity free to every household (known as, "Gruha Jyothi" scheme).
- Free 10 kg of rice per person per month to Below Poverty Line families (known as the, "Anna Bhāgya" scheme)
- ₹10,000 crore for minorities welfare and preservation of their places of worship
- ₹1,000 crore for Senior Citizen Welfare Fund
- Fill 250,000 vacant government posts
- New State Education Policy
- Strict action against people/organizations spreading hatred, potentially banning Popular Front of India and Bajrang Dal
- Introduction of new policy to tackle voter data leaks

=== Janata Dal (Secular) ===
The Janata Dal (Secular) kickstarted the Pancharatna Yatra in Mulabagilu on 1 November 2022. A road campaign across the Old Mysore region, it has been witnessing a huge turnout in the southern region of the state.

Former chief minister H. D. Kumaraswamy led the campaign "Pancharatna Yatra" outlined the party's five guarantees. The party pushed its regional appeal with the slogan "a vote to JD(S) is a vote to Kannadiga". Former prime minister H. D. Deve Gowda was also a very powerful factor in catching votes for the JD(S). Compared to big national parties BJP and Congress, JD(S) had limited resources and focused only on 45 seats.

==== Manifesto ====
JD(S) released its manifesto on 27 April 2023.

- ₹ 6,000 allowance for six months to pregnant women
- ₹ 2,000 monthly financial assistance for families of agricultural labourers
- ₹ 2,000 monthly allowance for auto drivers and registered security guards
- High tech hospitals and schools in all 6,006 GPs
- Free bicycle for 6.8 lakh high school students
- Electric moped of 60,000 girl students of first grade colleges
- Leather cluster in Belagavi, silk clusters in Ramanagara and Chikkaballapur
- Ancillary industry unit in each taluk
- Five free LPG cylinders per year
- Provision to increase the incentive for milk producers by ₹2
- Amusement park in association with Disney world in Mysuru
- Loan waiver for women and self help groups
- Restoration of 4% Muslim quota that was scrapped
- Boost to irrigation projects such as Upper Bhadra and Upper Krishna
- Implementation of Medakatu, Mahadayi and Yettinahole projects
- Promise to save the Nandini brand

== Surveys ==
=== Opinion polls ===
- Active parties
- Indian National Congress
- Bharatiya Janata Party
- Janata Dal (Secular)
- Others

Polling firm/commissioner	Sample size	Date published					Lead
Polling firm/commissioner	Sample size	Date published	INC	BJP	JD(S)	Others	Lead
South First-People's Pulse	4,585	4 January 2023	40%	36%	16%	8%	4%
ABP News-CVoter	24,759	29 March 2023	40.1%	34.7%	17.9%	7.3%	5.4%
South First-People's Pulse	5,600	13 April 2023	41%	36%	16%	7%	5%
Zee News-Matrize	2,92,000	1 May 2023	40%	42%	15%	3%	2%
ABP News-CVoter	73,774	6 May 2023	40.2%	36%	16.1%	7.7%	4.2%
South First-People's Pulse	3,360	7 May 2023	41.4%	36%	16%	6.6%	5.4%

Polling firm/commissioner	Sample size	Date published					Majority
Polling firm/commissioner	Sample size	Date published	INC	BJP	JD(S)	Others	Majority
South First-People's Pulse	4,585	4 January 2023	101	91	29	3	Hung
ABP-CVoter	24,759	29 March 2023	115-127	68-80	23-35	0-2	INC
South First-People's Pulse	5,600	13 April 2023	95-105	90-100	25-30	1-2	Hung
Zee News-Matrize	2,92,000	1 May 2023	79-91	103-115	26-36	1-3	Hung
ABP-CVoter	73,774	6 May 2023	110-122	73-85	21-29	2-6	INC
South First-People's Pulse	3,360	7 May 2023	105-117	81-93	24-29	1-3	Hung

=== Exit polls ===
Exit polls were published on 10 May 2023.

Polling firm/commissioner					Majority
Polling firm/commissioner	INC	BJP	JD(S)	Others	Majority
ABP News-C Voter	100-112	83-95	21-29	2-6	Hung
India Today-Axis My India	122-140	62-80	20-25	0-3	INC
India TV-CNX	110-120	80-90	20-24	1-3	INC
News 24-Today's Chanakya	120	92	12	0	INC
People's Insight	108	98	18	0	INC
News Nation-CGS	86	114	21	3	BJP
Republic TV -P MARQ	94-108	85-100	24-32	2-6	Hung
Suvarna News -Jan Ki Baat	91-106	94-117	14-24	0-2	Hung
Times Now-ETG	113	85	23	3	INC
TV 9 Bharatvarsh-Polstrat	99-109	88-98	21-26	0-4	Hung
Zee News-Matrize	103-118	79-94	25-33	2-5	Hung
Poll of polls	109	91	22	2	Hung
Actual results	135	66	19	4	INC

== Results ==
Vote share by party
1. Indian National Congress (42.9%)
2. Bharatiya Janata Party (36.0%)
3. Janata Dal (Secular) (13.3%)
4. Other (7.83%)
Seat share by party
1. Indian National Congress (60.3%)
2. Bharatiya Janata Party (29.5%)
3. Janata Dal (Secular) (8.48%)
4. Other (1.79%)

=== Result by party ===
Party	INC	BJP	JD(S)	Oth
Seats	135	66	19	4

Results
Party	Popular vote			Seats		
Party	Votes	%	±pp	Contested	Won	+/−
Indian National Congress	1,67,89,305	42.88	▲4.74	223	135	▲55
Bharatiya Janata Party	1,40,96,604	36.00	▼0.35	224	66	▼38
Janata Dal (Secular)	52,05,690	13.30	▼5.01	209	19	▼18
Kalyana Rajya Pragathi Paksha	2,48,284	0.63	▲0.63	46	1	▲1
Sarvodaya Karnataka Paksha	95,978	0.25	▲0.2	8	1	▲1
Independents	15,93,517	4.07	▲0.17	898	2	▲1
Others	10,05,683	2.18	▼0.32	669	0	▼2
NOTA	2,69,764	0.69	▼0.21	224		
Total	3,91,55,182	100%				
Valid votes						
Invalid votes						
Votes cast / turnout	3,91,55,182	73.84				
Abstentions	1,30,18,397	26.16				
Registered voters	5,31,31,579					

=== Results by district ===
District	Seats				
District	Seats	INC	BJP	JDS	OTH
Belagavi	18	11	7	—N/a	—N/a
Bagalakot	7	5	2	—N/a	—N/a
Vijayapura	8	6	1	1	—N/a
Kalaburagi	9	7	2	—N/a	—N/a
Yadagir	4	3	—N/a	1	—N/a
Bidar	6	2	4	—N/a	—N/a
Raichur	7	4	2	1	—N/a
Koppal	5	3	1	—N/a	1
Gadag	4	2	2	—N/a	—N/a
Dharwad	7	4	3	—N/a	—N/a
Uttara Kannada	6	4	2	—N/a	—N/a
Haveri	6	6	—N/a	—N/a	—N/a
Vijayanagara	5	2	1	1	1
Ballari	5	5	—N/a	—N/a	—N/a
Chitradurga	6	5	1	—N/a	—N/a
Davanagere	7	6	1	—N/a	—N/a
Shivamogga	7	3	3	1	—N/a
Udupi	5	—N/a	5	—N/a	—N/a
Chikkamagaluru	5	5	—N/a	—N/a	—N/a
Tumakuru	11	7	2	2	—N/a
Chikkaballapura	5	3	—N/a	1	1
Kolar	6	4	—N/a	2	—N/a
Bengaluru Urban	28	12	16	—N/a	—N/a
Bengaluru Rural	4	3	1	—N/a	—N/a
Ramanagara	4	4	—N/a	—N/a	—N/a
Mandya	7	5	—N/a	1	1
Hassan	7	1	2	4	—N/a
Dakshina Kannada	8	2	6	—N/a	—N/a
Kodagu	2	2	—N/a	—N/a	—N/a
Mysuru	11	8	1	2	—N/a
Chamarajanagara	4	3	—N/a	1	—N/a
Total	224	135	66	19	4

=== Results by constituency ===
District	Constituency		Turnout	Winner				Runner-up				Margin
District	No.	Name	%	Candidate	Party	Votes	%	Candidate	Party	Votes	%	Margin
Belagavi	1	Nippani	82.68	Shashikala Jolle	BJP	73,348	39.14	Uttam Raosaheb Patil	NCP	66,056	35.25	7,292
Belagavi	2	Chikkodi-Sadalga	81.82	Ganesh Hukkeri	INC	128,349	69.82	Ramesh Katti	BJP	49,840	27.11	78,509
Belagavi	3	Athani	83.89	Laxman Savadi	INC	131,404	68.34	Mahesh Kumathalli	BJP	55,282	28.75	76,122
Belagavi	4	Kagwad	82.70	Raju Kage	INC	83,887	51.45	Shrimant Patil	BJP	74,560	46.00	9,327
Belagavi	5	Kudachi (SC)	77.51	Mahendra Tammannavar	INC	85,321	56.87	P. Rajeev	BJP	60,078	40.04	25,243
Belagavi	6	Raibag (SC)	78.16	Duryodhan Aihole	BJP	57,500	34.79	Shambhu Kallolikar	Ind	54,930	33.23	2,570
Belagavi	7	Hukkeri	80.64	Nikhil Umesh Katti	BJP	103,574	61.69	A. B. Patil	INC	42,551	36.34	61,023
Belagavi	8	Arabhavi	76.46	Balachandra Jarkiholi	BJP	115,402	60.70	Bhimappa Gadad	Ind	43,862	23.07	71,540
Belagavi	9	Gokak	74.23	Ramesh Jarkiholi	BJP	105,313	55.31	Mahantesh Kadadi	INC	79,901	41.97	25,412
Belagavi	10	Yemkanmardi (ST)	81.96	Satish Jarkiholi	INC	100,290	60.25	Basavaraj Hundri	BJP	43,079	25.88	57,211
Belagavi	11	Belgaum Uttar	59.42	Asif Sait	INC	69,184	46.28	Ravi B. Patil	BJP	64,953	43.45	4,231
Belagavi	12	Belgaum Dakshin	64.00	Abhay Patil	BJP	77,094	48.45	Ramkant Konduskar	Ind	64,786	40.72	12,308
Belagavi	13	Belgaum Rural	78.82	Lakshmi Hebbalkar	INC	107,619	52.61	Nagesh Manolkar	BJP	51,603	25.23	56,016
Belagavi	14	Khanapur	75.08	Vithal Somanna Halagekar	BJP	91,834	57.04	Anjali Nimbalkar	INC	37,205	23.11	54,629
Belagavi	15	Kittur	79.98	Babasaheb Patil	INC	77,536	49.49	Mahantesh Doddagoudar	BJP	74,543	47.58	2,993
Belagavi	16	Bailhongal	77.92	Mahantesh Koujalagi	INC	58,408	38.28	Jagdish Metgud	BJP	55,630	36.46	2,778
Belagavi	17	Saundatti Yellamma	81.72	Vishwas Vaidya	INC	71,224	43.61	Ratna Mamani	BJP	56,529	34.61	14,695
Belagavi	18	Ramdurg	75.55	Ashok Pattan	INC	80,294	52.13	Chikka Revanna	BJP	68,564	44.51	11,730
Bagalkot	19	Mudhol (SC)	78.87	R. B. Timmapur	INC	77,298	48.69	Govind Karjol	BJP	59,963	37.77	17,335
Bagalkot	20	Terdal	78.89	Siddu Savadi	BJP	77,265	43.01	Siddappa Konnur	INC	66,529	37.03	10,745
Bagalkot	21	Jamkhandi	78.07	Jagadish Gudagunti	BJP	81,937	48.86	Anand Nyamagouda	INC	77,221	46.05	4,716
Bagalkot	22	Bilgi	79.81	J. T. Patil	INC	95,652	51.75	Murugesh Nirani	BJP	84,523	45.73	11,129
Bagalkot	23	Badami	76.68	Bhimsen Chimmanakatti	INC	65,845	38.95	Shanthagouda T. Patil	BJP	56,120	33.20	9,725
Bagalkot	24	Bagalkot	69.39	H. Y. Meti	INC	79,336	46.57	Veerabhadrayya Charantimath	BJP	73,458	43.12	5,878
Bagalkot	25	Hungund	74.26	Vijayanand Kashappanavar	INC	78,434	47.43	Doddanagouda G. Patil	BJP	48,427	29.29	30,007
Vijayapura	26	Muddebihal	71.35	C. S. Nadagouda	INC	79,483	51.27	A. S. Patil	BJP	71,846	46.35	7,637
Vijayapura	27	Devar Hippargi	69.33	Bhimanagouda Patil	JD(S)	65,952	43.39	Somanagouda Patil	BJP	45,777	30.12	20,175
Vijayapura	28	Basavana Bagevadi	75.42	Shivanand Patil	INC	68,126	43.00	S. K. Bellubbi	BJP	43,263	27.30	24,863
Vijayapura	29	Babaleshwar	82.39	M. B. Patil	INC	93,923	52.42	Vijugouda Patil	BJP	78,707	43.92	15,216
Vijayapura	30	Bijapur City	64.97	Basangouda Patil Yatnal	BJP	94,211	51.47	Abdul Hameed Mushrif	INC	85,978	46.97	8,233
Vijayapura	31	Nagathan (SC)	67.04	Vittal Katakadhond	INC	78,990	43.75	Sanjeev Aihole	BJP	48,275	26.68	30,815
Vijayapura	32	Indi	74.46	Yashavanta Patil	INC	71,785	39.69	B. D. Patil	JD(S)	61,456	33.98	10,329
Vijayapura	33	Sindagi	73.27	Ashok M. Managuli	INC	87,621	50.53	Ramesh Bhusanur	BJP	79,813	46.03	7,808
Kalaburagi	34	Afzalpur	70.26	M. Y. Patil	INC	55,598	35.14	Nitin Guttedar	Ind	51,719	32.26	4,594
Kalaburagi	35	Jevargi	69.78	Ajay Singh	INC	70,810	42.30	D. S. Gouda	JD(S)	60,532	36.16	10,278
Yadgir	36	Shorapur (ST)	75.33	Raja Venkatappa Naik	INC	113,559	54.72	Narasimha Nayak	BJP	88,336	42.57	25,223
Yadgir	37	Shahapur	69.76	Sharanabasappa Darshanapur	INC	78,353	47.00	Ameenreddy Patil	BJP	52,326	31.39	26,027
Yadgir	38	Yadgir	65.28	Channareddy Patil Tunnur	INC	53,802	34.71	Venkatreddy Mudnal	BJP	50,129	32.34	3,673
Yadgir	39	Gurmitkal	65.41	Sharanagouda Kandakur	JD(S)	72,297	44.54	Baburao Chinchansur	INC	69,718	42.95	2,579
Kalaburagi	40	Chittapur (SC)	64.98	Priyank Kharge	INC	81,323	53.08	Manikanta Rathod	BJP	67,683	44.18	13,640
Kalaburagi	41	Sedam	77.98	Sharan Prakash Patil	INC	93,377	53.06	Rajkumar Patil	BJP	49,816	28.31	43,561
Kalaburagi	42	Chincholi (SC)	73.64	Avinash Jadhav	BJP	69,963	46.66	Subash V. Rathod	INC	69,105	46.09	858
Kalaburagi	43	Gulbarga Rural (SC)	62.90	Basawaraj Mattimud	BJP	84,466	52.10	Revu Naik Belamgi	INC	71,839	44.31	12,627
Kalaburagi	44	Gulbarga Dakshin	57.14	Allamprabhu Patil	INC	87,345	54.74	Dattatraya C. Patil Revoor	BJP	66,297	41.55	21,048
Kalaburagi	45	Gulbarga Uttar	58.24	Kaneez Fathima	INC	80,973	45.28	Chandrakant B. Patil	BJP	78,261	43.76	2,712
Kalaburagi	46	Aland	72.22	B. R. Patil	INC	89,508	51.27	Subhash Guttedar	BJP	79,160	45.34	10,348
Bidar	47	Basavakalyan	71.37	Sharanu Salagar	BJP	92,920	52.80	Vijay Singh	INC	78,505	44.61	14,415
Bidar	48	Humnabad	72.69	Siddu Patil	BJP	75,515	42.23	Rajashekar Patil	INC	73,921	41.34	1,594
Bidar	49	Bidar South	74.75	Shailendra Beldale	BJP	49,872	32.51	Ashok Kheny	INC	48,609	31.69	1,263
Bidar	50	Bidar	65.90	Rahim Khan	INC	69,165	46.03	Suryakanth Nagamarpalli	JD(S)	58,385	38.85	10,780
Bidar	51	Bhalki	75.67	Eshwara Khandre	INC	99,451	56.90	Prakash Khandre	BJP	71,745	41.05	27,706
Bidar	52	Aurad (SC)	72.27	Prabhu Chauhan	BJP	81,382	51.31	Bhimsain Rao Shinde	INC	71,813	45.28	9,569
Raichur	53	Raichur Rural (ST)	75.68	Basanagouda Daddal	INC	89,140	51.42	Tipparaju Hawaldar	BJP	75,283	43.43	13,857
Raichur	54	Raichur	62.45	S. Shivaraj Patil	BJP	69,655	47.96	Mohammed Shalam	INC	65,923	45.39	3,732
Raichur	55	Manvi (ST)	67.44	G. Hampayya Nayak	INC	66,922	42.43	A. Bhagavantaray	BJP	59,203	37.53	7,719
Raichur	56	Devadurga (ST)	75.12	Karemma Nayak	JD(S)	99,544	56.75	K. Shivanagouda Naik	BJP	65,288	37.22	34,256
Raichur	57	Lingsugur (SC)	68.16	Manappa D.Vajjal	BJP	58,769	33.73	D. S. Hulageri	INC	55,960	32.12	2,809
Raichur	58	Sindhanur	73.31	Hampanagouda Badarli	INC	73,645	41.98	K. Kariyappa	BJP	51,703	29.47	21,942
Raichur	59	Maski (ST)	71.41	Basanagouda Turvihal	INC	79,566	52.76	Pratapagouda Patil	BJP	66,513	44.11	13,053
Koppal	60	Kushtagi	78.30	Doddanagouda Patil	BJP	92,915	50.75	Amaregoud Bayyapur	INC	83,269	45.48	9,646
Koppal	61	Kanakagiri (SC)	78.79	Shivaraj Tangadagi	INC	106,164	60.13	Basavaraj Dadesugur	BJP	63,532	35.98	42,632
Koppal	62	Gangawati	79.04	G. Janardhana Reddy	KRPP	66,213	41.42	Iqbal Ansari	INC	57,947	36.25	8,266
Koppal	63	Yelburga	79.30	Basavaraj Rayareddy	INC	94,330	53.29	Halappa Achar	BJP	77,149	43.59	17,181
Koppal	64	Koppal	76.67	Raghavendra Hitnal	INC	90,430	46.43	Karadi Manjula	BJP	54,170	27.82	36,260
Gadag	65	Shirahatti (SC)	72.24	Chandru Lamani	BJP	74,489	45.43	Ramakrishna Doddamani	Ind	45,969	28.03	28,520
Gadag	66	Gadag	76.41	H. K. Patil	INC	89,958	52.84	Anil P. Menasinakai	BJP	74,828	43.96	15,130
Gadag	67	Ron	76.64	Gurupadagouda Patil	INC	94,865	53.24	Kalakappa Bandi	BJP	70,177	39.38	24,688
Gadag	68	Nargund	80.25	C. C. Patil	BJP	72,835	48.48	B. R. Yavagal	INC	71,044	47.29	1,791
Dharwad	69	Navalgund	78.13	N. H. Konaraddi	INC	86,081	53.16	Shankar Patil Munenakoppa	BJP	63,882	39.45	22,199
Dharwad	70	Kundgol	83.01	M. R. Patil	BJP	76,105	49.07	Kusuma Shivalli	INC	40,764	26.28	35,341
Dharwad	71	Dharwad	77.36	Vinay Kulkarni	INC	89,333	53.92	Amrut Desai	BJP	71,296	43.04	18,037
Dharwad	72	Hubli-Dharwad East (SC)	70.94	Abbayya Prasad	INC	85,426	57.47	Kranthi Kiran	BJP	53,056	35.69	32,370
Dharwad	73	Hubli-Dharwad Central	64.32	Mahesh Tenginakai	BJP	95,064	59.27	Jagadish Shettar	INC	60,775	37.89	34,289
Dharwad	74	Hubli-Dharwad West	64.80	Aravind Bellad	BJP	101,410	59.45	Deepak Chinchore	INC	62,717	36.77	38,693
Dharwad	75	Kalghatgi	83.32	Santosh Lad	INC	85,761	52.86	Chabbi Nagaraj	BJP	71,404	44.01	14,357
Uttara Kannada	76	Haliyal	78.68	R. V. Deshpande	INC	57,240	40.08	Sunil Hegade	BJP	53,617	37.54	3,623
Uttara Kannada	77	Karwar	74.82	Satish Krishna Sail	INC	77,445	47.15	Roopali Naik	BJP	75,307	45.84	2,138
Uttara Kannada	78	Kumta	78.63	Dinakar Keshav Shetty	BJP	59,965	40.37	Suraj Naik Soni	JD(S)	59,289	39.92	676
Uttara Kannada	79	Bhatkal	78.48	M. S. Vaidya	INC	100,442	57.45	Sunil Biliya Naik	BJP	67,771	38.76	32,671
Uttara Kannada	80	Sirsi	79.97	Bhimanna T. Naik	INC	76,887	47.89	Vishweshwar Hegde Kageri	BJP	68,175	42.47	8,712
Uttara Kannada	81	Yellapur	82.39	Arabil Shivaram Hebbar	BJP	74,699	49.69	V. S. Patil	INC	70,695	47.02	4,004
Haveri	82	Hangal	84.59	Srinivas Mane	INC	94,590	52.76	Shivaraj Sajjanar	BJP	72,645	40.52	21,945
Haveri	83	Shiggaon	80.46	Basavaraj Bommai	BJP	100,016	54.95	Yasir Ahmed Khan Pathan	INC	64,038	35.18	35,978
Haveri	84	Haveri (SC)	77.74	Rudrappa Lamani	INC	93,827	51.73	Gavisiddappa Dyamannavar	BJP	81,912	45.16	11,915
Haveri	85	Byadgi	84.18	Basavaraj Shivannanavar	INC	97,740	55.58	B. V. Rudrappa	BJP	73,899	42.02	23,841
Haveri	86	Hirekerur	85.76	U. B. Banakar	INC	85,378	53.53	B. C. Patil	BJP	70,358	44.11	15,020
Haveri	87	Ranebennur	81.36	Prakash Koliwad	INC	71,830	37.21	Arunkumar Guththur	BJP	62,030	32.14	9,800
Vijayanagara	88	Hoovina Hadagali (SC)	78.37	Krishna Nayaka	BJP	73,200	48.81	P. T. Parameshwar Naik	INC	71,756	47.85	1,444
Vijayanagara	89	Hagaribommanahalli (SC)	82.19	K. Nemiraj Naik	JD(S)	84,023	44.44	L. P. B. Bheema Naik	INC	72,679	38.44	11,344
Vijayanagara	90	Vijayanagara	72.35	H. R. Gaviyappa	INC	104,863	57.99	Siddharth Thakur	BJP	71,140	39.34	33,723
Ballari	91	Kampli (ST)	84.81	J. N. Ganesh	INC	100,424	55.21	T. H. Suresh Babu	BJP	76,333	41.97	24,091
Ballari	92	Siruguppa (ST)	77.39	B. M. Nagaraja	INC	90,862	54.05	M. S. Somalingappa	BJP	53,830	32.02	37,032
Ballari	93	Bellary (ST)	76.65	B. Nagendra	INC	103,836	56.84	B. Sriramulu	BJP	74,536	40.80	29,300
Ballari	94	Bellary City	68.80	Nara Bharath Reddy	INC	86,440	48.47	Gali Lakshmi Aruna	KRPP	48,577	27.24	37,863
Ballari	95	Sandur (ST)	77.39	E. Tukaram	INC	85,223	49.31	Shilpa Raghavendra	BJP	49,701	28.76	35,532
Vijayanagara	96	Kudligi (ST)	80.38	N. T. Srinivas	INC	104,753	63.95	Lokesh V. Nayaka	BJP	50,403	30.77	54,350
Chitradurga	97	Molakalmuru (ST)	83.44	N. Y. Gopalakrishna	INC	109,459	53.81	S. Thippeswamy	BJP	87,310	42.92	22,149
Chitradurga	98	Challakere (ST)	80.58	T. Raghumurthy	INC	67,952	38.16	M. Ravish Kumar	JD(S)	51,502	28.92	16,450
Chitradurga	99	Chitradurga	77.66	K. C. Veerendra Puppy	INC	122,021	59.84	G. H. Thippareddy	BJP	68,721	33.70	53,300
Chitradurga	100	Hiriyur	82.10	D. Sudhakar	INC	92,050	46.02	K. Poornima	BJP	61,728	30.86	30,322
Chitradurga	101	Hosadurga	84.77	B. G. Govindappa	INC	81,050	48.36	S. Lingamurthy	BJP	48,234	28.78	32,816
Chitradurga	102	Holalkere (SC)	83.74	M. Chandrappa	BJP	88,732	45.02	H. Anjaneya	INC	83,050	42.14	5,682
Davanagere	103	Jagalur (ST)	81.07	B. Devendrappa	INC	50,765	32.44	S. V. Ramachandra	BJP	49,891	31.88	874
Vijayanagara	104	Harapanahalli	81.70	Latha Mallikarjun	Ind	70,194	39.56	G. Karunakara Reddy	BJP	56,349	31.76	13,845
Davanagere	105	Harihar	81.16	B. P. Harish	BJP	63,924	37.94	N. H. Srinivasa	INC	59,620	35.39	4,304
Davanagere	106	Davanagere North	69.58	S. S. Mallikarjun	INC	94,019	56.00	Lokikere Nagaraj	BJP	69,547	41.42	24,472
Davanagere	107	Davanagere South	69.47	Shamanuru Shivashankarappa	INC	84,298	57.59	B. G. Ajay Kumar	BJP	56,410	38.54	27,888
Davanagere	108	Mayakonda (SC)	84.52	K. S. Basavanthappa	INC	70,916	43.83	Pushpa Vageeshaswamy	Ind	37,614	23.25	33,614
Davanagere	109	Channagiri	83.40	Basavaraju V. Shivaganga	INC	78,263	47.03	Madal Mallikarjuna	Ind	61,828	37.16	16,435
Davanagere	110	Honnali	85.48	D. G. Shanthana Gowda	INC	92,392	54.31	M. P. Renukacharya	BJP	74,832	43.99	17,560
Shimoga	111	Shimoga Rural (SC)	85.12	Sharada Puryanaik	JD(S)	86,340	47.74	K. B. Ashok Naik	BJP	71,198	39.37	15,142
Shimoga	112	Bhadravati	73.14	B. K. Sangameshwara	INC	66,208	42.63	Sharada Appaji	JD(S)	63,503	40.89	2,705
Shimoga	113	Shimoga	68.96	S. N. Channabasappa	BJP	96,490	53.66	H. C. Yogesh	INC	68,816	38.27	27,674
Shimoga	114	Tirthahalli	85.92	Araga Jnanendra	BJP	84,563	52.28	Kimmane Rathnakar	INC	72,322	44.71	12,241
Shimoga	115	Shikaripura	83.83	B. Y. Vijayendra	BJP	81,810	49.07	S. P. Nagarajagowda	Ind	70,802	42.27	11,008
Shimoga	116	Sorab	83.97	Madhu Bangarappa	INC	98,912	60.30	Kumar Bangarappa	BJP	54,650	33.32	44,262
Shimoga	117	Sagar	81.10	Belur Gopalkrishna	INC	88,988	53.46	Hartalu Halappa	BJP	72,966	43.83	16,022
Udupi	118	Byndoor	78.77	Gururaj Gantihole	BJP	98,628	53.12	K Gopala Poojary	INC	82,475	44.42	16,153
Udupi	119	Kundapura	79.90	Kiran Kumar Kodgi	BJP	102,424	61.16	Dinesh Hegde Molahalli	INC	60,868	36.35	41,556
Udupi	120	Udupi	76.53	Yashpal Anand Suvarna	BJP	97,079	58.46	Prasadraj Kanchan	INC	64,303	38.72	32,776
Udupi	121	Kapu	80.08	Gurme Suresh Shetty	BJP	80,559	53.23	Vinay Kumar Sorake	INC	67,555	44.63	13,004
Udupi	122	Karkala	82.28	V. Sunil Kumar	BJP	77,028	49.11	Udaya Shetty Muniyal	INC	72,426	46.18	4,602
Chikmagalur	123	Sringeri	83.00	T. D. Rajegowda	INC	59,171	41.79	D. N. Jeevaraj	BJP	58,970	41.65	201
Chikmagalur	124	Mudigere (SC)	77.76	Nayana Motamma	INC	50,843	38.00	Deepak Doddaiah	BJP	50,121	37.46	722
Chikmagalur	125	Chikmagalur	73.71	H. D. Thammaiah	INC	85,054	50.01	C. T. Ravi	BJP	79,128	46.53	5,926
Chikmagalur	126	Tarikere	79.56	G. H. Srinivasa	INC	63,086	40.93	D. S. Suresh	BJP	50,955	33.06	12,131
Chikmagalur	127	Kadur	81.93	K. S. Anand	INC	75,476	44.60	Belli Prakash	BJP	63,469	37.50	12,007
Tumakuru	128	Chiknayakanhalli	86.16	C. B. Suresh Babu	JD(S)	71,036	37.65	J. C. Madhu Swamy	BJP	60,994	32.33	10,042
Tumakuru	129	Tiptur	84.67	K. Shadakshari	INC	71,999	46.13	B. C. Nagesh	BJP	54,347	34.82	17,652
Tumakuru	130	Turuvekere	87.75	M. T. Krishnappa	JD(S)	68,163	42.51	Masala Jayaram	BJP	58,240	36.32	9,923
Tumakuru	131	Kunigal	87.67	H. D. Ranganath	INC	74,724	42.88	D. Krishnakumar	BJP	48,151	27.63	26,573
Tumakuru	132	Tumkur City	67.62	G. B. Jyothi Ganesh	BJP	59,165	33.79	N. Govindaraju	JD(S)	55,967	31.97	3,198
Tumakuru	133	Tumkur Rural	87.34	B. Suresh Gowda	BJP	89,191	48.90	D. C. Gowri Shankar	JD(S)	84,597	46.38	4,594
Tumakuru	134	Koratagere (SC)	85.29	G. Parameshwara	INC	79,099	45.31	P. R. Sudhakara Lal	JD(S)	64,752	37.09	14,347
Tumakuru	135	Gubbi	88.41	S. R. Srinivas	INC	60,520	37.79	S. D. Dilipkumar	BJP	51,979	32.46	8,541
Tumakuru	136	Sira	85.27	T. B. Jayachandra	INC	86,084	45.14	R. Ugresh	JD(S)	56,834	29.80	29,250
Tumakuru	137	Pavagada (SC)	86.69	H. V. Venkatesh	INC	83,062	49.62	K. M. Thimmarayappa	JD(S)	72,181	43.12	10,881
Tumakuru	138	Madhugiri	86.07	Kyathasandra N. Rajanna	INC	91,166	54.72	M. V. Veerabhadraiah	JD(S)	55,643	33.40	35,523
Chikkaballapura	139	Gauribidanur	85.91	K. H. Puttaswamy Gowda	Ind	83,837	46.37	N. H. Shivashankara Reddy	INC	46,551	25.75	37,286
Chikkaballapura	140	Bagepalli	86.23	S. N. Subbareddy	INC	82,128	47.37	C. Muniraju	BJP	62,949	36.31	19,179
Chikkaballapura	141	Chikkaballapur	88.07	Pradeep Eshwar	INC	86,224	46.65	K. Sudhakar	BJP	75,582	40.90	10,642
Chikkaballapura	142	Sidlaghatta	87.08	B. N. Ravi Kumar	JD(S)	68,932	38.89	Puttu Anjinappa	Ind	52,160	29.43	16,772
Chikkaballapura	143	Chintamani	84.55	M. C. Sudhakar	INC	97,324	51.05	J. K. Krishna Reddy	JD(S)	68,272	35.81	29,052
Kolar	144	Srinivaspur	88.10	G. K. Venkatashiva Reddy	JD(S)	95,463	49.99	K. R. Ramesh Kumar	INC	85,020	44.52	10,443
Kolar	145	Mulbagal (SC)	81.47	Samruddhi Manjunath	JD(S)	94,254	53.40	V. Adinarayana	INC	67,986	38.52	26,268
Kolar	146	Kolar Gold Field (SC)	74.03	M. Roopakala	INC	81,569	55.10	Ashwini Sampangi	BJP	31,102	21.01	50,467
Kolar	147	Bangarapet (SC)	80.03	S. N. Narayanaswamy	INC	77,292	47.04	M. Mallesh Babu	JD(S)	72,581	44.18	4,711
Kolar	148	Kolar	80.18	Kothur G. Manjunatha	INC	83,990	43.56	C. M. R. Srinath	JD(S)	53,229	27.61	30,761
Kolar	149	Malur	89.92	K. Y. Nanjegowda	INC	50,955	29.40	K. S. Manjunatha Gowda	BJP	50,707	29.26	248
Bangalore Urban	150	Yelahanka	62.59	S. R. Vishwanath	BJP	141,538	51.50	Keshava Rajanna B.	INC	77,428	28.18	64,110
Bangalore Urban	151	Krishnarajapuram	52.76	Byrati Basavaraj	BJP	139,925	51.93	D.K. Mohan	INC	115,624	42.91	24,301
Bangalore Urban	152	Byatarayanapura	57.84	Krishna Byre Gowda	INC	160,182	54.43	Thammesh Gowda H.C.	BJP	121,978	41.45	38,204
Bangalore Urban	153	Yeshwantpur	63.44	S. T. Somashekhar	BJP	169,149	47.26	T.N. Javarayi Gowda	JD(S)	154,031	43.04	15,118
Bangalore Urban	154	Rajarajeshwarinagar	54.07	Munirathna	BJP	127,980	48.72	Kusuma H.	INC	116,138	44.21	11,842
Bangalore Urban	155	Dasarahalli	50.23	S. Muniraju	BJP	91,289	39.75	R. Manjunatha	JD(S)	82,095	35.75	9,194
Bangalore Urban	156	Mahalakshmi Layout	54.48	K. Gopalaiah	BJP	96,424	60.60	Keshavamurthy S.	INC	45,259	28.45	51,165
Bangalore Urban	157	Malleshwaram	55.61	C. N. Ashwath Narayan	BJP	80,606	63.72	Anoop Iyengar	INC	39,304	31.07	41,302
Bangalore Urban	158	Hebbal	55.07	Byrathi Suresh	INC	91,838	57.71	Katta Jagdeesh Naidu	BJP	61,084	38.39	30,754
Bangalore Urban	159	Pulakeshinagar (SC)	54.74	A. C. Srinivasa	INC	87,316	66.72	Akhanda Srinivas Murthy	BSP	25,106	19.18	62,210
Bangalore Urban	160	Sarvagnanagar	53.04	K. J. George	INC	118,783	61.04	Padmanabha Reddy	BJP	63,015	32.38	55,768
Bangalore Urban	161	C. V. Raman Nagar (SC)	47.66	S. Raghu	BJP	69,228	53.53	Anand Kumar S.	INC	52,833	40.85	16,395
Bangalore Urban	162	Shivajinagar	56.91	Rizwan Arshad	INC	64,913	58.77	Chandra N.	BJP	41,719	37.77	23,194
Bangalore Urban	163	Shanti Nagar	54.31	N. A. Haris	INC	61,030	50.87	K. Shivakumar	BJP	53,905	44.93	7,125
Bangalore Urban	164	Gandhi Nagar	57.30	Dinesh Gundu Rao	INC	54,118	40.81	A.R. Sapthagiri Gowda	BJP	54,013	40.73	105
Bangalore Urban	165	Rajaji Nagar	56.94	S. Suresh Kumar	BJP	58,624	49.60	Puttanna	INC	50,564	42.78	8,060
Bangalore Urban	166	Govindraj Nagar	54.47	Priya Krishna	INC	82,134	50.87	K. Umesh Shetty	BJP	69,618	43.12	12,516
Bangalore Urban	167	Vijay Nagar	51.89	M. Krishnappa	INC	80,157	50.50	H. Ravindra	BJP	72,833	45.89	7,324
Bangalore Urban	168	Chamrajpet	54.27	B. Z. Zameer Ahmed Khan	INC	77,631	62.22	Bhaskar Rao	BJP	23,678	18.98	53,953
Bangalore Urban	169	Chickpet	58.24	Uday Garudachar	BJP	57,299	44.48	R. V. Devraj	INC	45,186	35.07	12,113
Bangalore Urban	170	Basavanagudi	54.92	L. A. Ravi Subramanya	BJP	78,854	61.47	U.B. Venkatesh	INC	23,876	18.61	54,978
Bangalore Urban	171	Padmanabhanagar	57.35	R. Ashoka	BJP	98,750	61.72	V. Raghunatha Naidu	INC	43,575	27.24	55,175
Bangalore Urban	172	B.T.M. Layout	49.16	Ramalinga Reddy	INC	68,557	50.70	K.R. Sridhara	BJP	59,335	43.88	9,222
Bangalore Urban	173	Jayanagar	57.48	C. K. Ramamurthy	BJP	57,797	47.87	Sowmya Reddy	INC	57,781	47.85	16
Bangalore Urban	174	Mahadevapura (SC)	55.10	Manjula S.	BJP	181,731	54.31	H. Nagesh	INC	137,230	41.01	44,501
Bangalore Urban	175	Bommanahalli	47.49	M. Satish Reddy	BJP	113,574	52.82	Umapathy Srinivasa Gowda	INC	89,359	41.56	24,215
Bangalore Urban	176	Bangalore South	54.92	M. Krishnappa	BJP	196,220	59.35	R. K. Ramesh	INC	146,521	38.35	49,699
Bangalore Urban	177	Anekal (SC)	62.52	B. Shivanna	INC	134,797	53.55	Srinivas C. Hullahalli	BJP	103,472	41.11	31,325
Bangalore Rural	178	Hoskote	91.37	Sharath Kumar Bache Gowda	INC	107,220	50.13	M. T. B. Nagaraj	BJP	102,145	47.75	5,075
Bangalore Rural	179	Devanahalli (SC)	85.09	K. H. Muniyappa	INC	73,058	40.46	L. N. Nisarga Narayanaswamy	JD(S)	68,427	37.90	4,631
Bangalore Rural	180	Doddaballapur	85.12	Dheeraj Muniraj	BJP	85,144	46.69	T. Venkatesh	INC	53,391	29.28	31,753
Bangalore Rural	181	Nelamangala (SC)	79.50	N. Shreenivasaiah	INC	84,229	48.72	K. Srinivasamurthy	JD(S)	52,251	30.22	31,978
Ramanagara	182	Magadi	86.75	H. C. Balakrishna	INC	94,650	46.74	A. Manjunath	JD(S)	82,811	40.89	11,839
Ramanagara	183	Ramanagaram	84.57	H. A. Iqbal Hussain	INC	87,690	47.98	Nikhil Kumaraswamy	JD(S)	76,975	42.12	10,715
Ramanagara	184	Kanakapura	84.73	D.K. Shivakumar	INC	143,023	74.58	Nagaraju	JD(S)	20,631	11.08	1,22,392
Ramanagara	185	Channapatna	85.86	H. D. Kumaraswamy	JD(S)	96,592	48.83	C. P. Yogeshwara	BJP	80,677	40.79	15,915
Mandya	186	Malavalli (SC)	79.65	P. M. Narendraswamy	INC	106,498	53.79	K. Annadani	JD(S)	59,652	30.13	46,846
Mandya	187	Maddur	85.75	K. M. Udaya	INC	87,019	47.45	D. C. Thammanna	JD(S)	62,906	34.30	24,113
Mandya	188	Melukote	91.86	Darshan Puttannaiah	SKP	91,151	49.57	C. S. Puttaraju	JD(S)	80,289	43.66	10,862
Mandya	189	Mandya	77.79	Ravikumar Gowda	INC	61,411	35.18	B. R. Ramachandra	JD(S)	59,392	34.03	2,019
Mandya	190	Shrirangapattana	86.85	Ramesha Bandisiddegowda	INC	72,817	39.32	Ravindra Srikantaiah	JD(S)	61,680	33.31	11,137
Mandya	191	Nagamangala	89.67	N. Chaluvaraya Swamy	INC	90,634	47.17	Suresh Gowda	JD(S)	86,220	44.87	4,414
Mandya	192	Krishnarajapet	86.16	H. T. Manju	JD(S)	80,646	42.55	B. I. Devaraja	INC	58,302	30.76	22,344
Hassan	193	Shravanabelagola	85.30	C. N. Balakrishna	JD(S)	85,668	48.93	M. A. Gopalaswamy	INC	79,023	45.14	6,645
Hassan	194	Arsikere	86.68	K. M. Shivalinge Gowda	INC	98,375	52.86	N. R. Santosh	JD(S)	78,198	42.02	20,177
Hassan	195	Belur	82.91	H. K. Suresh	BJP	63,571	38.76	B. Shivaramu	INC	55,835	34.04	7,736
Hassan	196	Hassan	74.87	Swaroop Prakash	JD(S)	85,176	49.80	Preetham J. Gowda	BJP	77,322	45.21	7,854
Hassan	197	Holenarasipur	84.10	H. D. Revanna	JD(S)	88,103	47.51	Shreyas M. Patel	INC	84,951	45.81	3,152
Hassan	198	Arkalgud	85.12	A. Manju	JD(S)	74,643	38.49	M. T. Krishnegowda	Ind	55,038	28.38	19,605
Hassan	199	Sakleshpur (SC)	80.10	Cement Manju	BJP	58,604	35.54	H. K. Kumaraswamy	JD(S)	56,548	34.29	2,056
Dakshina Kannada	200	Belthangady	82.56	Harish Poonja	BJP	101,004	53.44	Rakshith Shivaram	INC	82,788	43.80	18,216
Dakshina Kannada	201	Moodabidri	77.39	Umanatha Kotian	BJP	86,925	54.77	Mithun Rai	INC	64,457	40.61	22,468
Dakshina Kannada	202	Mangalore City North	73.10	Bharath Shetty Y	BJP	103,531	56.77	Inayath Ali	INC	70,609	38.72	32,922
Dakshina Kannada	203	Mangalore City South	65.88	D. Vedavyas Kamath	BJP	91,437	56.46	John Richard Lobo	INC	67,475	41.67	23,962
Dakshina Kannada	204	Mangalore	77.99	U. T. Khader	INC	83,219	52.01	Satish Kumpala	BJP	60,429	37.77	22,790
Dakshina Kannada	205	Bantval	81.24	U Rajesh Naik	BJP	93,324	50.29	Ramanath Rai	INC	85,042	45.83	8,282
Dakshina Kannada	206	Puttur	81.17	Ashok Kumar Rai	INC	66,607	38.55	Arun Kumar Puthila	Ind	62,458	36.15	4,149
Dakshina Kannada	207	Sullia (SC)	79.89	Bhageerathi Murulya	BJP	93,911	57.01	G. Krishnappa Ramakunja	INC	53,037	38.27	40,874
Kodagu	208	Madikeri	76.21	Mantar Gowda	INC	84,879	47.84	Appachu Ranjan	BJP	80,466	45.36	4,413
Kodagu	209	Virajpet	74.59	A. S. Ponnanna	INC	83,791	49.94	K. G. Bopaiah	BJP	79,500	47.38	4,291
Mysore	210	Periyapatna	84.45	K. Venkatesh	INC	85,944	52.02	K. Mahadeva	JD(S)	66,269	40.11	19,675
Mysore	211	Krishnarajanagara	86.60	D. Ravishankar	INC	104,502	55.34	S. R. Mahesh	JD(S)	78,863	41.76	25,639
Mysore	212	Hunsur	83.15	G. D. Harish Gowda	JD(S)	94,666	47.11	H. P. Manjunath	INC	92,254	45.91	2,412
Mysore	213	Heggadadevankote (ST)	80.75	Anil Chikkamadhu	INC	84,359	46.26	K. M. Krishnanayaka	BJP	49,420	27.10	34,939
Mysore	214	Nanjangud (SC)	79.79	Darshan Dhruvanarayana	INC	109,125	62.05	B. Harshavardhan	BJP	61,518	34.98	47,607
Mysore	215	Chamundeshwari	75.06	G. T. Devegowda	JD(S)	104,873	42.44	S. Siddegowda	INC	79,373	32.12	25,500
Mysore	216	Krishnaraja	60.02	T. S. Srivatsa	BJP	73,670	49.01	M. K. Somashekar	INC	66,457	44.21	7,213
Mysore	217	Chamaraja	61.15	K. Harish Gowda	INC	72,931	48.42	L. Nagendra	BJP	68,837	45.70	4,094
Mysore	218	Narasimharaja	64.04	Tanveer Sait	INC	83,480	45.14	S. Satheesh Swamy	BJP	52,360	28.31	31,120
Mysore	219	Varuna	85.01	Siddaramaiah	INC	116,856	60.43	V. Somanna	BJP	70,811	36.94	46,045
Mysore	220	T. Narasipur (SC)	79.20	H. C. Mahadevappa	INC	77,884	48.00	M. Ashvin Kumar	JD(S)	59,265	36.53	18,619
Chamarajanagar	221	Hanur	81.38	M. R. Manjunath	JD(S)	75,632	41.93	R. Narendra	INC	57,978	32.14	17,654
Chamarajanagar	222	Kollegal (SC)	77.44	A. R. Krishnamurthy	INC	108,363	64.59	N. Mahesh	BJP	48,844	29.11	38,481
Chamarajanagar	223	Chamarajanagar	82.60	C. Puttarangashetty	INC	83,858	48.46	V. Somanna	BJP	76,325	44.10	7,533
Chamarajanagar	224	Gundlupet	87.89	H. M. Ganesh Prasad	INC	107,794	57.34	C. S. Niranjan Kumar	BJP	71,119	37.83	36,675

=== Seat shifts and retentions ===
Party	Seats retained	Seats lost	Seats gained	Final count
INC	57	23	78	135
BJP	51	53	15	66
JD(S)	6	23	13	19
SKP	0	0	1	1
KRPP	0	0	1	1
IND	0	1	2	2

== Aftermath ==
Indian National Congress won with a thumping majority, and Siddaramaiah, the MLA from Varuna Constituency in Mysuru district, staked a claim to form government, becoming chief minister-designate, and met Governor Thawarchand Gehlot. D. K. Shivakumar, MLA from Kanakapura Constituency in Ramanagara district was designated as Deputy Chief Minister, while another 8 MLAs took their oath on 20 May 2023.

=== Election expenditure ===
Following the election, it was revealed in expenditure reports to the Election Commission of India that the BJP spent ₹196.70 crore ($23.7 million) in poll-related expenses during the election, 43% higher than the Congress's expenditure of ₹136.90 crore ($16.5 million). The report includes money spent on advertisements, travel expenditures of star campaigners, surveys, and candidates.

It was also revealed that in the 2018 Karnataka Assembly election campaign the BJP had spent ₹122.68 crore, while the Congress had spent ₹38.48 crore.

== Bypolls (2023-2028) ==
Constituency		Date of poll	Reason	Winner				Runner-up				Margin	
Constituency		Date of poll	Reason	Candidate	Party	Votes	%	Candidate	Party	Votes	%	Votes	%
36	Shorapur	7 May 2024	(Note: By-Poll Held due to death of Incumbent MLA)	Raja Venugopal Naik	INC	114,886	53.36	Narasimha Nayak	BJP	96,566	44.85	18,320	8.51
83	Shiggaon	13 Nov. 2024	(Note: By-Poll held due to resignation of Incumbent MLAs who were elected to Lok Sabha)	Yasir Ahmed Khan Pathan	INC	100,756	52.41	Bharat Bommai	BJP	87,308	45.41	13,448	7.00
95	Sandur	13 Nov. 2024	(Note: By-Poll held due to resignation of Incumbent MLAs who were elected to Lok Sabha)	E. Annapoorna Tukaram	INC	93,616	51.95	Bangaru Hanumatu	BJP	83,967	46.60	9,649	5.35
185	Channapatna	13 Nov. 2024	(Note: By-Poll held due to resignation of Incumbent MLAs who were elected to Lok Sabha)	C. P. Yogeshwara	INC	112,642	54.33	Nikhil Kumaraswamy	JD(S)	87,229	42.07	25,413	12.26
24	Bagalkot	9 Apr 2026		Umesh Hullappa Meti	INC	98,919	55.41	Veerabhadrayya Charanthimath	BJP	76,587	42.90	22,332	12.51
107	Davanagere South	9 Apr 2026		Samarth Mallikarajun	INC	69,578	43.95	Srinivas T. Dasakariyappa	BJP	63,870	40.34	5,708	3.61
100	Hiriyur	TBD											

== See also ==
- 2023 elections in India
- Elections in Karnataka
- Caste politics in Karnataka
- Operation Kamala in Karnataka
- 2019 Karnataka political crisis
- Second Siddaramaiah ministry
