= Byndoor Assembly constituency =

Legislative Assembly constituency in Karnataka State, India

Coordinates: 13.87°N 74.63°E

Byndoor
- Constituency No. 118 for the Karnataka Legislative Assembly

Constituency details
- Country: India
- Region: South India
- State: Karnataka
- District: Udupi
- Lok Sabha constituency: Shimoga
- Established: 1956
- Total electors: 235,716
- Reservation: None

Member of Legislative Assembly
- 16th Karnataka Legislative Assembly
- Incumbent Gururaj Gantihole
- Party: Bharatiya Janata Party
- Elected year: 2023
- Preceded by: B. M. Sukumar Shetty

Byndoor Assembly constituency is one of the 224 Legislative Assembly constituencies of Karnataka state in India.

It is part of Udupi district. It consists of parts of Byndoor Taluk and Kundapura Taluk.

== Members of the Legislative Assembly ==
Election	Member	Party
1957	Y. Manjayya Shetty	Indian National Congress
1962	Y. Manjayya Shetty	Indian National Congress
1967	S. R. Halsnad	Praja Socialist Party
1972	A. G. Kodgi	Indian National Congress
1978	Gopalrishna Kodgi	Indian National Congress
1983	Appanna Hegde. B	Janata Party
1985	G. S. Achar	Indian National Congress
1989	G. S. Achar	Indian National Congress
1994	I. M. Jayarama Shetty	Bharatiya Janata Party
1998 By-election (Note: Resigned on 23/03/1998)	K Gopala Poojary	Indian National Congress
1999	K Gopala Poojary	Indian National Congress
2004	K Gopala Poojary	Indian National Congress
2008	K. Laxminarayana	Bharatiya Janata Party
2013	K Gopala Poojary	Indian National Congress
2018	B. M. Sukumar Shetty	Bharatiya Janata Party
2023	Gururaj Gantihole	Bharatiya Janata Party

== Election results ==
=== Assembly Election 2023 ===
2023 Karnataka Legislative Assembly election : Byndoor
Party	Candidate	Votes	%	±%
BJP	Gururaj Gantihole	98,628	53.12%	▼1.22
INC	K Gopala Poojary	82,475	44.42%	▲3.88
NOTA	None of the above	1,208	0.65%	▼0.28
Margin of victory		16,153	8.70%	▼5.10
Turnout		185,829	78.84%	▼0.65
Total valid votes		185,683		
Registered electors		235,716		▲5.96
BJP hold		Swing	▼1.22	

=== Assembly Election 2018 ===
2018 Karnataka Legislative Assembly election : Byndoor
Party	Candidate	Votes	%	±%
BJP	B. M. Sukumar Shetty	96,029	54.34%	▲17.55
INC	K Gopala Poojary	71,636	40.54%	▼18.66
CPI(M)	Suresh Kallagar	2,415	1.37%	▼0.76
JD(S)	Ravi Shetty	1,911	1.08%	▲0.34
NOTA	None of the above	1,647	0.93%	New
Margin of victory		24,393	13.80%	▼8.61
Turnout		176,841	79.49%	▲3.48
Total valid votes		176,726		
Registered electors		222,468		▲14.13
BJP gain from INC		Swing	▼4.86	

=== Assembly Election 2013 ===
2013 Karnataka Legislative Assembly election : Byndoor
Party	Candidate	Votes	%	±%
INC	K Gopala Poojary	82,277	59.20%	▲16.80
BJP	B. M. Sukumar Shetty	51,128	36.79%	▼11.85
KJP	Naveenchandra Uppunda	4,177	3.01%	New
CPI(M)	K. Shanker	2,960	2.13%	▼0.14
Independent	H. Suresh Poojray	1,611	1.16%	New
BSP	Udaya Kumar Tallur	1,515	1.09%	▼0.63
JD(S)	Surayya Banu	1,023	0.74%	▼0.50
Independent	Sridhar Pedemane	957	0.69%	New
Margin of victory		31,149	22.41%	▲16.18
Turnout		148,159	76.01%	▼0.59
Total valid votes		138,983		
Registered electors		194,920		▲16.68
INC gain from BJP		Swing	▲10.56	

=== Assembly Election 2008 ===
2008 Karnataka Legislative Assembly election : Byndoor
Party	Candidate	Votes	%	±%
BJP	K. Laxminarayana	62,196	48.64%	▲4.71
INC	K Gopala Poojary	54,226	42.40%	▼4.75
CPI(M)	U. Dasa Bhandary	2,908	2.27%	New
Independent	H. Suresh Poojray	2,265	1.77%	New
BSP	Udaya Kumar Tallur	2,195	1.72%	New
Independent	Subbanna Shetty	1,648	1.29%	New
JD(S)	Shiriyara Muddanna Shetty	1,587	1.24%	▼1.02
Independent	Manjappa Kamalaksha	856	0.67%	New
Margin of victory		7,970	6.23%	▲3.01
Turnout		127,959	76.60%	▲9.10
Total valid votes		127,881		
Registered electors		167,054		▲11.61
BJP gain from INC		Swing	▲1.49	

=== Assembly Election 2004 ===
2004 Karnataka Legislative Assembly election : Byndoor
Party	Candidate	Votes	%	±%
INC	K Gopala Poojary	47,627	47.15%	▼5.63
BJP	Lakshminarayana. K	44,375	43.93%	▼2.69
JD(U)	I. M. Jayarama Shetty	3,071	3.04%	New
JD(S)	Adiga Srikantha. K. N	2,288	2.26%	▲1.66
Kannada Nadu Party	Billava. N. K	1,758	1.74%	New
Independent	Syed Beary	856	0.85%	New
Margin of victory		3,252	3.22%	▼2.95
Turnout		101,028	67.50%	▼0.69
Total valid votes		101,016		
Registered electors		149,678		▲14.19
INC hold		Swing	▼5.63	

=== Assembly Election 1999 ===
1999 Karnataka Legislative Assembly election : Byndoor
Party	Candidate	Votes	%	±%
INC	K Gopala Poojary	46,075	52.78%	▼7.00
BJP	K. Laxminarayana	40,693	46.62%	▲15.15
JD(S)	Shrikantha Adiga	527	0.60%	New
Margin of victory		5,382	6.17%	▼22.14
Turnout		89,383	68.19%	▲9.22
Total valid votes		87,295		
Rejected ballots		2,023	2.26%	▲1.18
Registered electors		131,083		▲1.89
INC hold		Swing	▼7.00	

=== Assembly By-election 1998 ===
1998 Karnataka Legislative Assembly by-election : Byndoor
Party	Candidate	Votes	%	±%
INC	K Gopala Poojary	44,864	59.78%	▲36.50
BJP	Appanna Hegde. B	23,620	31.47%	▼6.00
JD	Prakashchandra Shetty. S	5,805	7.74%	▼8.85
Independent	Ganapa Ganiga	477	0.64%	New
Margin of victory		21,244	28.31%	▲14.12
Turnout		75,861	58.97%	▼6.38
Total valid votes		75,044		
Rejected ballots		817	1.08%	▼0.29
Registered electors		128,649		▲4.09
INC gain from BJP		Swing	▲22.31	

=== Assembly Election 1994 ===
1994 Karnataka Legislative Assembly election : Byndoor
Party	Candidate	Votes	%	±%
BJP	I. M. Jayarama Shetty	29,841	37.47%	▲34.83
INC	Mani Gopal	18,541	23.28%	▼24.79
JD	Appanna Hegde. B	13,211	16.59%	▼30.78
INC	K Gopala Poojary	10,436	13.10%	New
Independent	Alponse Lobo	6,517	8.18%	New
Margin of victory		11,300	14.19%	▲13.49
Turnout		80,767	65.35%	▼1.07
Total valid votes		79,643		
Rejected ballots		1,109	1.37%	▼2.75
Registered electors		123,589		▲5.41
BJP gain from INC		Swing	▼10.60	

=== Assembly Election 1989 ===
1989 Karnataka Legislative Assembly election : Byndoor
Party	Candidate	Votes	%	±%
INC	G. S. Achar	35,892	48.07%	▼0.74
JD	Mani Gopal	35,373	47.37%	New
BJP	B. Mahabaleshwara Holla	1,970	2.64%	New
JP	Suresha	768	1.03%	New
Margin of victory		519	0.70%	▼0.01
Turnout		77,879	66.42%	▼0.58
Total valid votes		74,667		
Rejected ballots		3,212	4.12%	▲2.79
Registered electors		117,251		▲33.25
INC hold		Swing	▼0.74	

=== Assembly Election 1985 ===
1985 Karnataka Legislative Assembly election : Byndoor
Party	Candidate	Votes	%	±%
INC	G. S. Achar	28,393	48.81%	▼0.41
JP	Mani Gopal	27,979	48.10%	▼1.16
Independent	Varkey Devasya	898	1.54%	New
Independent	Girija	496	0.85%	New
Independent	P. Ramakrishna	407	0.70%	New
Margin of victory		414	0.71%	▲0.66
Turnout		58,956	67.00%	▲0.17
Total valid votes		58,173		
Rejected ballots		783	1.33%	▼1.03
Registered electors		87,995		▲9.76
INC gain from JP		Swing	▼0.45	

=== Assembly Election 1983 ===
1983 Karnataka Legislative Assembly election : Byndoor
Party	Candidate	Votes	%	±%
JP	Appanna Hegde. B	25,771	49.26%	▲13.95
INC	G. S. Achar	25,747	49.22%	▲45.41
Independent	B. G. Mohandas	796	1.52%	New
Margin of victory		24	0.05%	▼23.88
Turnout		53,579	66.83%	▼0.04
Total valid votes		52,314		
Rejected ballots		1,265	2.36%	▼0.25
Registered electors		80,169		▲4.42
JP gain from INC(I)		Swing	▼9.98	

=== Assembly Election 1978 ===
1978 Karnataka Legislative Assembly election : Byndoor
Party	Candidate	Votes	%	±%
INC(I)	Gopalrishna Kodgi	29,622	59.24%	New
JP	Elwin. P. Crasto	17,655	35.31%	New
INC	N. S. Parameshwaraiah	1,905	3.81%	▼67.98
Independent	K. Sachidananda Shetty	819	1.64%	New
Margin of victory		11,967	23.93%	▼33.00
Turnout		51,339	66.87%	▲14.28
Total valid votes		50,001		
Rejected ballots		1,338	2.61%	▲2.61
Registered electors		76,775		▼4.32
INC(I) gain from INC		Swing	▼12.55	

=== Assembly Election 1972 ===
1972 Mysore State Legislative Assembly election : Byndoor
Party	Candidate	Votes	%	±%
INC	A. G. Kodgi	29,496	71.79%	▲33.83
Independent	D. Ganapayya	6,104	14.86%	New
ABJS	S. V. Pai	5,489	13.36%	New
Margin of victory		23,392	56.93%	▲46.90
Turnout		42,200	52.59%	▼4.15
Total valid votes		41,089		
Registered electors		80,244		▲9.23
INC gain from PSP		Swing	▲23.80	

=== Assembly Election 1967 ===
1967 Mysore State Legislative Assembly election : Byndoor
Party	Candidate	Votes	%	±%
PSP	S. R. Halsnad	18,700	47.99%	▲4.41
INC	A. G. Kodgi	14,791	37.96%	▼11.05
SWA	J. K. Hegde	3,468	8.90%	New
Independent	H. G. Narasimhayya	1,162	2.98%	New
Independent	U. K. Shet	844	2.17%	New
Margin of victory		3,909	10.03%	▲4.60
Turnout		41,682	56.74%	▲6.30
Total valid votes		38,965		
Registered electors		73,464		▲4.51
PSP gain from INC		Swing	▼1.02	

=== Assembly Election 1962 ===
1962 Mysore State Legislative Assembly election : Byndoor
Party	Candidate	Votes	%	±%
INC	Y. Manjayya Shetty	16,591	49.01%	New
PSP	H. Subba Rao	14,752	43.58%	New
Independent	Vishweshwaraya	2,508	7.41%	New
Margin of victory		1,839	5.43%	
Turnout		35,454	50.44%	
Total valid votes		33,851		
Registered electors		70,291		
INC hold		Swing		

=== Assembly Election 1957 ===
1957 Mysore State Legislative Assembly election : Byndoor
Party	Candidate	Votes	%	±%
INC	Y. Manjayya Shetty	Unopposed		
Registered electors		65,128		
INC win (new seat)				

== See also ==
- List of constituencies of the Karnataka Legislative Assembly
- Udupi district
