= Gururaj Gantihole =

Indian politician

Member of the Karnataka Legislative Assembly.
- Incumbent
- Assumed office 13 May 2023
- Preceded by: B. M. Sukumar Shetty
- Constituency: Byndoor

Personal details
- Born: Gururaj Shetty Gantihole; 10 June 1981 (age 45) Gantihole, Byndoor, Karnataka
- Party: Bharatiya Janata Party
- Spouse: Anuradha Shetty
- Education: University of Mysore

Gururaj Shetty Gantihole is an Indian politician as a member of Bharatiya Janata Party from Byndoor Assembly Constituency since May 2023 after he defeated Indian National Congress's candidate K Gopala Poojary by 16,153 votes contesting the 2023 Karnataka Legislative Assembly election on a Bharatiya Janata Party ticket.

== History ==
Gururaj Gantihole was born to Mahabala Shetty and Prema Shetty in Gantihole Bijoor, Karnataka. In 2008, he completed his master's degree in Mass Communication Journalism at Mysore Open University.

== Career ==
He has worked for Rashtriya Swayamsevak Sangh for almost 10 years, During the years 2013 to 2015 he worked as vice president for Bharatiya Janata Party, Udupi. BJP has given the ticket to Gururaj Gantihole from the Byndoor constituency. He won the 2023 Karnataka Legislative Assembly election and currently serving as a Member of Karnataka Legislative Assembly of Byndoor Region.
