= P. Rajeev =

P. Rajeev may refer to:

- P. Rajeev (Karnataka) (born 1977), Indian politician from the state of Karnataka
- P. Rajeeve (born 1967), Indian politician from the state of Kerala
