= Mahendra Kallappa Tammannavar =

Indian politician

Member of the Karnataka Legislative Assembly
- Incumbent
- Assumed office 13 May 2023
- Preceded by: P. Rajeev
- Constituency: Kudachi

Personal details
- Party: Indian National Congress

Mahendra Kallappa Tammannavar (born 1978) is an Indian politician from Karnataka. He is a Member of the Karnataka Legislative Assembly from the Kudachi Assembly constituency which is reserved for SC community in Belgaum. He represents Indian National Congress.

== Early life and education ==
Kallappa is from Kudachi, Belgaum district. His father Kallappa Ratnappa Tammannavar is a farmer. He completed his Bachelor of Arts in 2002 at Karnataka College, Dharwad.

== Career ==
Kallappa won from Kudachi Assembly constituency which is reserved for SC community in Belgaum district. Representing Indian National Congress, he polled 85,321 votes and defeated his nearest rival, P. Rajeev of Bharatiya Janata Party, by a margin of 25,243 votes.
