= Saundatti Yellamma Assembly constituency =

Legislative Assembly constituency in Karnataka, India

Coordinates: 15.76°N 75.13°E

Saundatti Yellamma
- Constituency No. 17 for the Karnataka Legislative Assembly

Constituency details
- Country: India
- Region: South India
- State: Karnataka
- District: Belagavi
- Lok Sabha constituency: Belagavi
- Established: 2008
- Reservation: None

Member of Legislative Assembly
- 16th Karnataka Legislative Assembly
- Incumbent Vishwas Vasant Vaidya
- Party: Indian National Congress
- Elected year: 2023
- Preceded by: Anand Mamani

Saundatti Yellamma Assembly constituency (also spelt Savadatti), is one of 224 assembly constituencies in Karnataka in India. It is one of the eight constituencies which make up Belagavi Lok Sabha constituency. The constituency came into existence when the assembly map was redrawn in 2008. Prior to that most of its area was under the now-defunct Parasgad Assembly constituency.

Anand Chandrashekhar Mamani won this seat in 2018 election. Chandrashekhar Mamani, Anand's father, was elected to Assembly as Janata Dal candidate from Parasgad in 1994. Anand Mamani was elected Deputy Speaker of Karnataka Assembly in March 2020.

== Members of the Legislative Assembly ==
Election	Member	Party
2008	Anand Mamani	Bharatiya Janata Party
2013	Anand Mamani	Bharatiya Janata Party
2018	Anand Mamani	Bharatiya Janata Party
2023	Vishwas Vaidya	Indian National Congress

== Election results ==
=== Assembly Election 2023 ===
2023 Karnataka Legislative Assembly election : Saundatti Yellamma
Party	Candidate	Votes	%	±%
INC	Vishwas Vaidya	71,224	43.61	▲24.08
BJP	Ratna Anand Mamani	56,529	34.61	▼6.04
JD(S)	Chopra Saurav Anand	30,857	18.89	New
AAP	Bapugouda Siddanagouda Patil	1,596	0.98	New
NOTA	None of the above	586	0.36	▼0.26
Margin of victory		14,695	9.00	▲4.91
Turnout		163,486	81.81	▲1.64
Total valid votes		163,317		
Registered electors		199,847		▲4.23
INC gain from BJP		Swing	▲2.96	

=== Assembly Election 2018 ===
2018 Karnataka Legislative Assembly election : Saundatti Yellamma
Party	Candidate	Votes	%	±%
BJP	Anand Mamani	62,480	40.65	▲5.78
Independent	Anand Chopra	56,189	36.56	New
INC	Vishwas Vaidya	30,018	19.53	▼3.30
AIMEP	Shameer Karimbeg Jamadar	970	0.63	New
NOTA	None of the above	960	0.62	New
Margin of victory		6,291	4.09	▼7.96
Turnout		153,725	80.17	▲1.21
Total valid votes		153,707		
Registered electors		191,740		▲13.65
BJP hold		Swing	▲5.78	

=== Assembly Election 2013 ===
2013 Karnataka Legislative Assembly election : Saundatti Yellamma
Party	Candidate	Votes	%	±%
BJP	Anand Mamani	46,434	34.87	▼9.34
INC	Ravindra Bhupalappa Yaligar	30,392	22.83	▼17.19
Independent	Anandkumar Chopra	29,851	22.42	New
KJP	Vishwanath Karabasappa Mamani	18,391	13.81	New
JD(S)	D. B. Naik	2,630	1.98	▼8.81
Independent	Mallikarjun Channappa Melagiri	1,990	1.49	New
NCP	Angadi Mahesh Gurappa	1,036	0.78	New
JD(U)	Desaigouda Rudragouda Patil	969	0.73	New
BSRCP	Hanamantappa Virupaxappa Kallur	897	0.67	New
Margin of victory		16,042	12.05	▲7.86
Turnout		133,218	78.96	▲4.63
Total valid votes		133,145		
Registered electors		168,709		▲14.88
BJP hold		Swing	▼9.34	

=== Assembly Election 2008 ===
2008 Karnataka Legislative Assembly election : Saundatti Yellamma
Party	Candidate	Votes	%	±%
BJP	Anand Mamani	48,255	44.21	New
INC	Koujalagi Subhash Shidramappa	43,678	40.02	New
JD(S)	Dyamanagoudar Panchanagouda Basanagouda	11,780	10.79	New
Independent	Ramachandra Mareppa Toragall (Chalawadi)	1,724	1.58	New
BSP	Ramanagouda Siddanagouda Patil	1,219	1.12	New
Independent	Mallikarjun Channappa Melagiri	839	0.77	New
Independent	Gudusab Nabisab Mulla	797	0.73	New
Margin of victory		4,577	4.19	
Turnout		109,158	74.33	
Total valid votes		109,145		
Registered electors		146,862		
BJP win (new seat)				

== See also ==
- Belagavi District
- List of constituencies of Karnataka Legislative Assembly
