= Anand Mamani =

Indian politician (1966-2022)

11th Deputy Speaker of the Karnataka Legislative Assembly
- In office 24 March 2020 – 23 October 2022
- Speaker: Vishweshwar Hegde Kageri
- Preceded by: J. K. Krishna Reddy
- Succeeded by: Rudrappa Lamani

Member of Karnataka Legislative Assembly
- In office 2008–2022
- Preceded by: Constituency created
- Constituency: Saundatti Yellamma

Personal details
- Born: 18 January 1966 Saundatti, Mysore State, (Now Karnataka)
- Died: 23 October 2022 (aged 56) Bangalore, Karnataka
- Party: Bharatiya Janata Party
- Spouse(s): 1st wife rekha mamani and 2nd wife ratna mamani
- Children: 1 son & 1 daughter
- Parent: Chandrashekhar Mamani (father)
- Education: Bachelor of Commerce
- Profession: Politician

Anand Mamani also known as Vishwanath Chandrashekar Mamani was an Indian politician from Bharatiya Janata Party, Karnataka who served as the Deputy Speaker of the Karnataka Legislative Assembly from 24 March 2020 till his death. He was a three term Member of Legislative Assembly from Saundatti Yellamma Assembly constituency.

His father, Chandrashekar Mallikarjun Mamani, held the position of deputy speaker during the 1990s. Chandrashekar Mamani himself was elected as a Member of the Legislative Assembly (MLA) four times. Once as an independent candidate and three times representing the Janata Parivar. Additionally, his uncle, Vishwanath Karibasappa Mamani, also known as Rajanna Mamani, served as an independent MLA in 2004.

In 2022, he died due to health complications. His condition worsened, leading to his admission to a hospital in Chennai. He was diabetic and had also faced a liver infection. Anand was transferred back to a hospital in Bangalore, where he remained in a coma for the last few days before his passing.
