= Gulbarga Rural Assembly constituency =

Constituency of the Karnataka legislative assembly in India

Coordinates: 17.36°N 76.84°E

Gulbarga Rural
- Constituency No. 43 for the Karnataka Legislative Assembly

Constituency details
- Country: India
- Region: South India
- State: Karnataka
- District: Kalaburagi
- Lok Sabha constituency: Gulbarga
- Established: 2008
- Total electors: 257,752
- Reservation: SC

Member of Legislative Assembly
- 16th Karnataka Legislative Assembly
- Incumbent Basawaraj Mattimud
- Party: Bharatiya Janata Party
- Elected year: 2018
- Preceded by: G. Ramkrishna

Gulbarga Rural Assembly constituency is one of the 224 constituencies in the Karnataka Legislative Assembly of Karnataka, a southern state of India. Gulbarga Rural is also part of Gulbarga Lok Sabha constituency.

== Members of the Legislative Assembly ==
Election	Member	Party
2008	Revu Naik Belamgi	Bharatiya Janata Party
2013	G. Ramkrishna	Indian National Congress
2018	Basawaraj Mattimud	Bharatiya Janata Party
2023	Basawaraj Mattimud	Bharatiya Janata Party

== Election results ==
=== Assembly Election 2023 ===
2023 Karnataka Legislative Assembly election : Gulbarga Rural
Party	Candidate	Votes	%	±%
BJP	Basawaraj Mattimud	84,466	52.10	▲11.61
INC	Revu Naik Belamgi	71,839	44.31	▲11.94
NOTA	None of the above	839	0.52	▼0.54
Margin of victory		12,627	7.79	▼0.33
Turnout		162,651	63.10	▲2.15
Total valid votes		162,119		
Registered electors		257,752		▲2.90
BJP hold		Swing	▲11.61	

=== Assembly Election 2018 ===
2018 Karnataka Legislative Assembly election : Gulbarga Rural
Party	Candidate	Votes	%	±%
BJP	Basawaraj Mattimud	61,750	40.49	▲12.47
INC	Vijaykumar G. Ramakrishna	49,364	32.37	▼1.79
JD(S)	Revu Naik Belamgi	29,538	19.37	▲12.03
CPI(M)	Ambalaga Maruti Manapade	3,491	2.29	▼1.71
Independent	Girish Bailappa Kambanavar	2,129	1.40	New
NOTA	None of the above	1,612	1.06	New
SUCI(C)	Ganapath Rao K. Mane	1,044	0.68	▼0.75
Margin of victory		12,386	8.12	▲1.97
Turnout		152,687	60.95	▲2.49
Total valid votes		152,495		
Registered electors		250,497		▲18.65
BJP gain from INC		Swing	▲6.33	

=== Assembly Election 2013 ===
2013 Karnataka Legislative Assembly election : Gulbarga Rural
Party	Candidate	Votes	%	±%
INC	G. Ramkrishna	40,075	34.16	▲11.51
BJP	Revunayak Belamgi	32,866	28.02	▼10.71
KJP	Baburao Chauhan	26,612	22.69	New
JD(S)	D. G. Sagar	8,612	7.34	▼11.67
CPI(M)	Ambalaga Maruti Manapade	4,694	4.00	▼6.22
BSRCP	Babuhonna Naik	2,113	1.80	New
SUCI(C)	Niganna. S. Jambagi	1,673	1.43	New
BSP	Ambaraya. S. Belamgi	1,584	1.35	▼4.62
Independent	Satish Basavaraj Shinde	1,426	1.22	New
Margin of victory		7,209	6.15	▼9.93
Turnout		123,434	58.46	▲8.40
Total valid votes		117,303		
Registered electors		211,131		▼0.78
INC gain from BJP		Swing	▼4.57	

=== Assembly Election 2008 ===
2008 Karnataka Legislative Assembly election : Gulbarga Rural
Party	Candidate	Votes	%	±%
BJP	Revu Naik Belamgi	41,239	38.73	New
INC	Chandrika Parameshwar	24,116	22.65	New
JD(S)	C. Gurunath	20,247	19.01	New
CPI(M)	Maruti Manpade	10,881	10.22	New
BSP	Chandrakant Gaddgi	6,360	5.97	New
Independent	Shrimanth	3,644	3.42	New
Margin of victory		17,123	16.08	
Turnout		106,516	50.06	
Total valid votes		106,487		
Registered electors		212,792		
BJP win (new seat)				

== See also ==
- Gulbarga
- List of constituencies of Karnataka Legislative Assembly
