= Kudachi Assembly constituency =

Legislative Assembly constituency in Karnataka, India

Coordinates: 16.63°N 74.85°E

Kudachi
- Constituency No. 5 for the Karnataka Legislative Assembly

Constituency details
- Country: India
- Region: South India
- State: Karnataka
- District: Belagavi
- Lok Sabha constituency: Chikkodi
- Established: 2008
- Total electors: 193,564 (2023)
- Reservation: SC

Member of Legislative Assembly
- 16th Karnataka Legislative Assembly
- Incumbent Mahendra Kallappa Tammannavar
- Party: INC
- Elected year: 2023
- Preceded by: P. Rajeev

Kudachi Assembly constituency is one of the 224 constituencies in the Karnataka Legislative Assembly of Karnataka, a southern state of India. Kagwad is also part of Chikkodi Lok Sabha constituency.

== Members of the Legislative Assembly ==
Election	Member	Party
2008	Ghatage Shama Bhima	Indian National Congress
2013	P. Rajeev	Badavara Shramikara Raitara Congress
2018	P. Rajeev	Bharatiya Janata Party
2023	Mahendra Kallappa Tammannavar	Indian National Congress

== Election results ==
=== Assembly Election 2023 ===
2023 Karnataka Legislative Assembly election : Kudachi
Party	Candidate	Votes	%	±%
INC	Mahendra Kallappa Tammannavar	85,321	56.87%	▲18.25
BJP	P. Rajeev	60,078	40.04%	▼9.56
JD(S)	Anand. V. Malagi	1,566	1.04%	▼0.08
KRPP	Shreeshail. H. Bhajantri	1,240	0.83%	New
NOTA	None of the above	643	0.43%	▲0.18
Margin of victory		25,243	16.82%	▲5.84
Turnout		150,262	77.63%	▲1.93
Total valid votes		150,040		
Registered electors		193,564		▲7.23
INC gain from BJP		Swing	▲7.27	

=== Assembly Election 2018 ===
2018 Karnataka Legislative Assembly election : Kudachi
Party	Candidate	Votes	%	±%
BJP	P. Rajeev	67,781	49.60%	▲37.20
INC	Amit Shama Ghatage	52,773	38.62%	▲17.10
Independent	Suresh Gurappa Talawar	6,731	4.93%	New
JD(S)	Aihole Rajendra Annappa	1,532	1.12%	▲0.21
Independent	Sangeeta Gajendra Kamble	1,105	0.81%	New
Independent	Sanjeev Basappa Kambale	1,045	0.76%	New
Independent	Ramappa Bharamappa Bhajantri	1,004	0.73%	New
NOTA	None of the above	348	0.25%	New
Margin of victory		15,008	10.98%	▼29.09
Turnout		136,653	75.70%	▼2.30
Total valid votes		136,653		
Registered electors		180,509		▲22.01
BJP gain from BSRCP		Swing	▼11.99	

=== Assembly Election 2013 ===
2013 Karnataka Legislative Assembly election : Kudachi
Party	Candidate	Votes	%	±%
BSRCP	P. Rajeev	71,057	61.59%	New
INC	Ghatage Shama Bhima	24,823	21.52%	▼10.17
BJP	Mahendra Kallappa Tammannavar	14,310	12.40%	▼18.47
KJP	Parashuram Santram Gadivaddar	1,066	0.92%	New
JD(S)	Shantaram Sakharam Sannakki	1,050	0.91%	▼3.44
Independent	Shrimant Tukaram Kadam	937	0.81%	New
Karnataka Swarajya Party	Hullennavar Ningappa Tayappa	730	0.63%	New
Margin of victory		46,234	40.07%	▲39.25
Turnout		115,397	78.00%	▲9.64
Total valid votes		115,375		
Registered electors		147,946		▲8.73
BSRCP gain from INC		Swing	▲29.90	

=== Assembly Election 2008 ===
2008 Karnataka Legislative Assembly election : Kudachi
Party	Candidate	Votes	%	±%
INC	Ghatage Shama Bhima	29,481	31.69%	New
BJP	Mahendra K. Tammannavar	28,715	30.87%	New
Independent	P. Rajeev	22,978	24.70%	New
JD(S)	Bhimappa Channappa Sarikar	4,045	4.35%	New
Independent	M. Venkataswamy	2,252	2.42%	New
Independent	Maya Subhas Sonavane	2,138	2.30%	New
BSP	Asode Raju Maruti	1,910	2.05%	New
Independent	Dodamani Ramu Amrut	961	1.03%	New
Margin of victory		766	0.82%	
Turnout		93,018	68.36%	
Total valid votes		93,017		
Registered electors		136,073		
INC win (new seat)				

== See also ==
- Raibag Taluk
- Belagavi district
- Chikkodi Lok Sabha constituency
- List of constituencies of Karnataka Legislative Assembly
