= Basawaraj Mattimud =

Indian politician

Member of the Karnataka Legislative Assembly
- Incumbent
- Assumed office 2018
- Preceded by: Ramakrishna G
- Constituency: Gulbarga Rural

Personal details
- Born: 3 March 1980 (age 46) Mattimudu, (Karnataka)
- Party: Bharatiya Janata Party

Basawaraj Mattimud is an Indian politician who is the current Member of the Karnataka Legislative Assembly from Gulbarga Rural in the 2018 Karnataka Legislative Assembly election as a member of the Bharatiya Janata Party. Before contesting MLA election, he worked as zilla panchayat member from Adaki in Sedam taluk.
