= Revu Naik Belamgi =

Indian politician

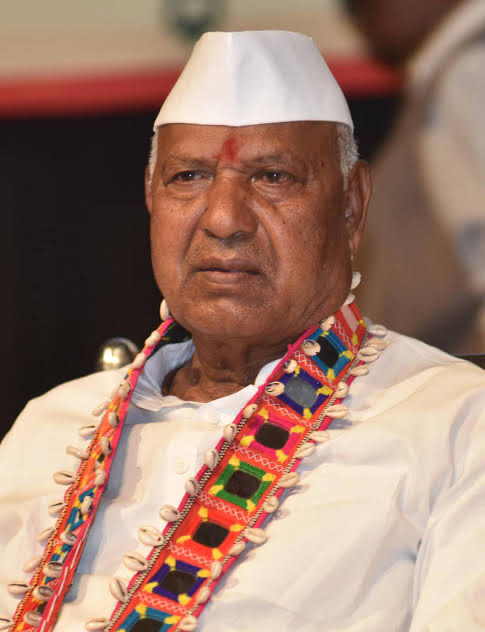
- In office 1994–2008
- Constituency: Kamalapur
- In office 2008–2013
- Constituency: Gulbarga Rural

Minister of Animal Husbandry, Government of Karnataka
- In office 4 August 2011 – 13 May 2013

Minister of Small Savings & Lotteries, Government of Karnataka
- In office 23 September 2010 – 31 July 2011

Minister of Animal Husbandry, Government of Karnataka
- In office 30 May 2008 – 23 September 2010

Personal details
- Born: 1941 (age 84–85) Belamgi Tanda
- Party: Indian National Congress (since 2022)
- Other political affiliations: Janata Dal (Secular) (2019); BJP (1994–2019)
- Children: 4

Revu Naik Belamagi (born 1941) is an Indian politician from Indian National Congress who served as a Member of the Legislative Assembly from Kamalapur constituency in Kalaburagi district of Karnataka.

== Political career ==
Revunaik Belamgi was first elected to the Karnataka Legislative Assembly in 1994 from the Gulbarga Rural constituency in Kalaburagi district. He was the member of Bhartiya Janata Party from 1994 until 2019. He then joined Janata Dal (Secular) and contested from Gulbarga Rural constituency. He aligned with Indian National Congress in 2022.
