= Vishwas Vaidya =

Indian politician

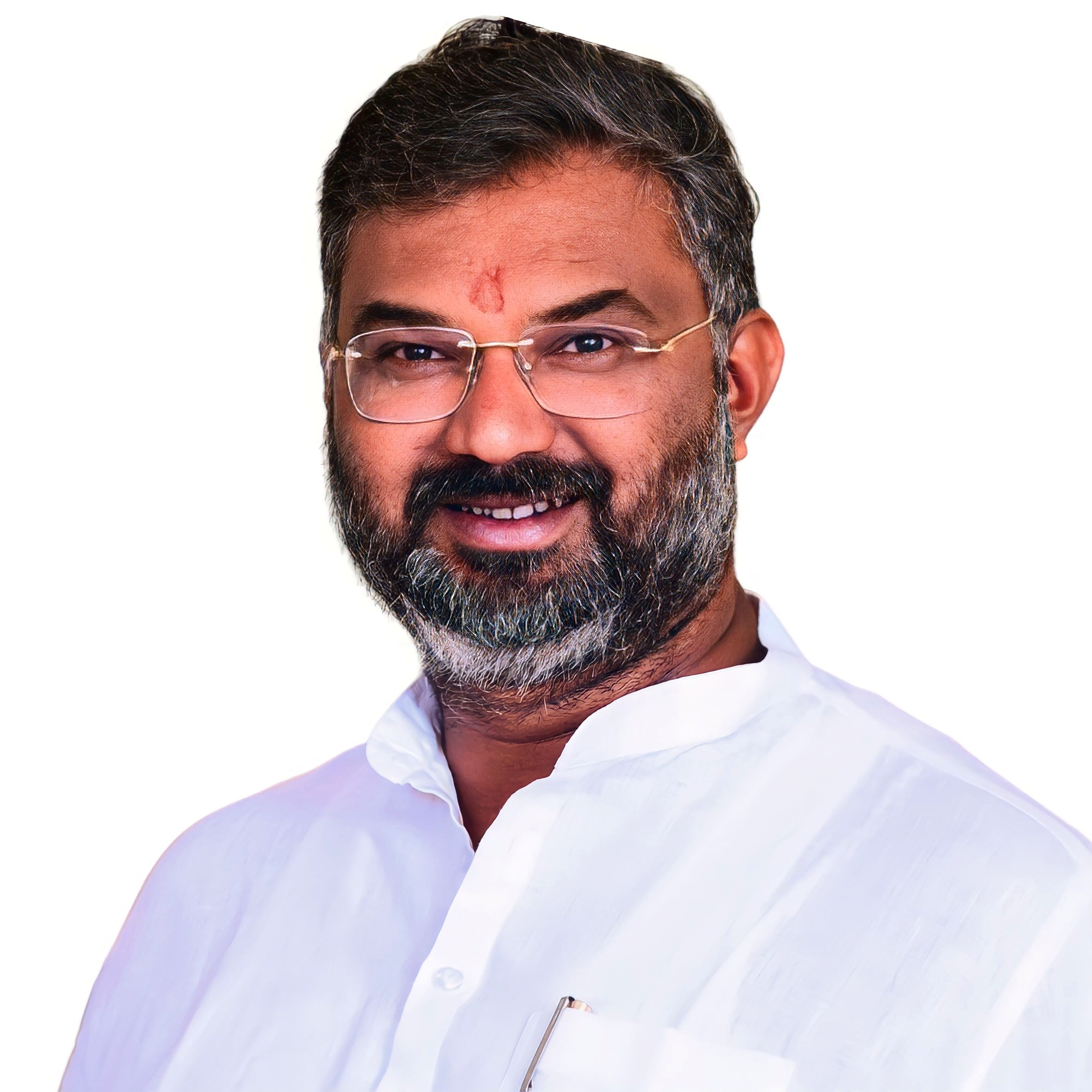
Vishwas Vaidya

Member of the Karnataka Legislative Assembly
- Incumbent
- Assumed office 2023
- Constituency: Saundatti Yallamma

Personal details
- Born: 12 October 1982 (age 44) Saundatti Yellamma, Karnataka, India
- Party: Indian National Congress
- Spouse: Shruti Vaidya
- Website: Instagram

Vishwas Vasant Vaidya (born 12 October 1982) is an Indian politician and member of the Indian National Congress as a member of the Karnataka Legislative Assembly representing the Saundatti Yellamma in Belgaum district.Facebook
