= K Gopala Poojary =

Indian politician, Chairman of Karnataka State Road Transport Co

Member of the Karnataka Legislative Assembly
- Incumbent
- Assumed office 2013

Chairman of the Karnataka Forest Development Corporation
- In office 2017–2019
- Prime Minister: Narendra Modi

Personal details
- Born: 21 August 1959 (age 67) Kundapur
- Party: Indian National Congress
- Children: 3
- Education: Secondary School Leaving Certificate
- Occupation: Politician
- Profession: KSRTC CHAIRMAN

Kalmady Gopala Poojary is an Indian politician who worked as Chairman of Karnataka Forest Development Corporation and member of Karnataka Legislative Assembly from Baindur. He was born in Kalmady, Byndoor in August 1959 to a poor farmer family. After graduation Gopala Poojary moved to Mumbai to find work. On his return to Karnataka, Gopala Poojary started his restaurant business in 1984. Introduced to politics through his political Godfather S Bangarappa. Gopala Poojary contests election for the first time as a member of the KCP in 1994 garnering 10436 votes. Gopala Poojary contests the 1996 by election as an INC candidate for the first time winning the election by 8000 votes. Gopala Poojary goes on to win the next two elections registering a hattrick of wins in 1996, 1999 and 2004. He tasted defeat for the first time in 2008. He later went on to hold the Udupi District President Post. Gopala Poojary contests election once again in 2013 and wins by a margin of 31000 votes. He is defeated in the election of 2018. Gopala Poojary is considered to be a very senior leader in Udupi and is regarded as "Badavara Bandu" and lauded for being a simple politician in his hometown Byndoor.

K Gopala Poojary has been appointed as Karnataka Forest Development Corporation Chairman in 2016.

== Constituency ==
He represents the Byndoor constituency.

== Political party ==
He is from the Indian National Congress. He has been elected four times from the Byndoor constituency. He has contested 6 elections as a member of the Indian National Congress winning four times. He is regarded as a strong and loyal leader of the Congress Party from the South Canara region. In 2004 he was the only Congress candidate to win an assembly election out of the five constituencies in Udupi District.
