= P. Rajeev (Karnataka) =

Indian politician

Member of 14th Karnataka Legislative Assembly
- In office 2013–2018
- Succeeded by: Shama bhima ghatge
- Constituency: Kudachi

Member of 15th Karnataka Legislative Assembly
- Incumbent
- Assumed office 2018
- Constituency: Kudachi

Personal details
- Born: 5 June 1977 (age 47); Kuppagadde
- Political party: BJP

Pandappa Rajeev is an Indian BJP politician member of the Karnataka Legislative Assembly.

P. Rajeev was appointed sub-inspector in 2008 at Kudachi police station framed rescue team to flood affected area in Raibag taluka. He made sure that flood affected people reached a safe place. He got elected as Legislative assembly member.

In 2016, in an interview with India Today he claimed to be an independent MLA.

He contested the 2013 Karnataka Legislative Assembly elections as a Badavara Shramikara Raitara Congress candidate from Kudachi assembly constituency and won polling 71,057 votes.

In the 2018 Karnataka Legislative Assembly elections he contested as a BJP candidate and won by a margin of 15,008 votes.
