= Bijapur, Karnataka Assembly constituency =

Former Assembly constituency in Karnataka, India

Coordinates: 16.83°N 75.71°E

Bijapur
- Former constituency for the Karnataka Legislative Assembly

Constituency details
- Country: India
- Region: South India
- State: Karnataka
- District: Bijapur
- Lok Sabha constituency: Bijapur
- Established: 1951
- Abolished: 2008
- Reservation: None

Bijapur Assembly constituency was one of 224 assembly constituencies of the Indian state of Karnataka until 2008. The constituency was readjusted in 2008 on the implementation of the Delimitation Commission of 2002 as Bijapur City Assembly constituency. The constituency was a part of Bombay State before the States Reorganisation Act, 1956.

== Members of the Legislative Assembly ==
| Election | Member | Party |
|---|---|---|
| 1952 | Patil Mallangauda Ramangauda | Indian National Congress |
| 1952 By-election | B. R. Sidalingappa | Indian National Congress |
| 1957 | Dr. Sardar Basavraj Nagur | Independent politician |
| 1962 | Revansiddapa Sharanappa Navadagi | Indian National Congress |
| 1967 | P. B. Mallanagauda | Indian National Congress |
| 1972 | K. T. Rathod | Indian National Congress |
| 1978 | Bakshi Sayyad Habibuddin Shamanasaheb | Janata Party |
| 1983 | Gachinmath Chandrashekar Gurupadaya | Bharatiya Janata Party |
| 1985 | Ustad Mehboob Patel | Indian National Congress |
| 1989 | Ustad Mehboob Patel | Indian National Congress |
| 1994 | Basangouda Patil Yatnal | Bharatiya Janata Party |
| 1999 | Ustad Mehboob Patel | Indian National Congress |
| 2004 | Appu Pattanshetty | Bharatiya Janata Party |

== Election results ==
=== Assembly Election 2004 ===
2004 Karnataka Legislative Assembly election : Bijapur
| Party | Candidate | Votes | % | ±% |
|---|---|---|---|---|
| BJP | Appu Pattanshetty | 70,001 | 55.55 | ▲18.70 |
| INC | Ustad Mehboob Patel | 45,968 | 36.48 | ▼3.30 |
| JD(S) | Farooqui Riyazahmed Gayasuddin | 4,521 | 3.59 | ▼0.21 |
| BSP | Dharmanna Shivayogappa Tontapur | 2,912 | 2.31 | ▲1.10 |
| Independent | Dr. Rajesh Yamanappa Walyapur | 1,023 | 0.81 | New |
| Kannada Nadu Party | Bhavi Vishwanath Satalingappa | 787 | 0.62 | New |
| Margin of victory | | 24,033 | 19.07 | ▲16.15 |
| Turnout | | 126,135 | 59.30 | ▼0.66 |
| Total valid votes | | 126,006 | | |
| Registered electors | | 212,723 | | ▲12.66 |
| BJP gain from INC | | Swing | ▲15.77 | |

=== Assembly Election 1999 ===
1999 Karnataka Legislative Assembly election : Bijapur
| Party | Candidate | Votes | % | ±% |
|---|---|---|---|---|
| INC | Ustad Mehboob Patel | 42,902 | 39.78 | ▲30.61 |
| BJP | Appu Pattanshetty | 39,749 | 36.85 | ▼12.53 |
| Independent | Patil Kashiraya Gouda Devanagouda | 14,518 | 13.46 | New |
| JD(S) | Kalebag Mainoddin Aminsab | 4,100 | 3.80 | New |
| Independent | Mahishi Vamanrao Narayan | 3,383 | 3.14 | New |
| BSP | Prof. Inamdar. S. S | 1,301 | 1.21 | New |
| Independent | Kadechur Kallappa Revanasiddappa | 956 | 0.89 | New |
| Margin of victory | | 3,153 | 2.92 | ▼14.67 |
| Turnout | | 113,213 | 59.96 | ▲1.73 |
| Total valid votes | | 107,861 | | |
| Rejected ballots | | 5,345 | 4.72 | ▲0.82 |
| Registered electors | | 188,822 | | ▲15.19 |
| INC gain from BJP | | Swing | ▼9.60 | |

=== Assembly Election 1994 ===
1994 Karnataka Legislative Assembly election : Bijapur
| Party | Candidate | Votes | % | ±% |
|---|---|---|---|---|
| BJP | Basanagouda Ramanagouda Patil (yatnal) | 45,286 | 49.38 | ▲48.18 |
| JD | Patel Habib Usman Maktumpatel | 29,158 | 31.80 | ▼9.11 |
| INC | Sutar Muniralias Jilani Magadumsab | 8,405 | 9.17 | ▼45.16 |
| CPI | Chanchalakar Milind Layappa | 1,962 | 2.14 | New |
| Independent | Shrishail Gurupadayya Gachhinamatyh | 1,955 | 2.13 | New |
| Independent | Toshniwal Ghanashyamadas Radhakishan | 1,546 | 1.69 | New |
| INC | Lahori Khalika-u-zama Abdul Rahaman | 1,422 | 1.55 | New |
| Independent | Hiremath Shivayya Rachayya | 599 | 0.65 | New |
| Margin of victory | | 16,128 | 17.59 | ▲4.17 |
| Turnout | | 95,453 | 58.23 | ▼2.82 |
| Total valid votes | | 91,702 | | |
| Rejected ballots | | 3,726 | 3.90 | ▼0.73 |
| Registered electors | | 163,926 | | ▲13.66 |
| BJP gain from INC | | Swing | ▼4.95 | |

=== Assembly Election 1989 ===
1989 Karnataka Legislative Assembly election : Bijapur
| Party | Candidate | Votes | % | ±% |
|---|---|---|---|---|
| INC | Ustad Mehboob Patel | 45,623 | 54.33 | ▲6.47 |
| JD | Avarangbad Rachappa Shivappa | 34,355 | 40.91 | New |
| JP | Jagannath Siddayya Udaipikar | 2,380 | 2.83 | New |
| BJP | Akki Sanganbasappa Dundappa | 1,004 | 1.20 | ▼1.80 |
| Margin of victory | | 11,268 | 13.42 | ▲12.13 |
| Turnout | | 88,041 | 61.05 | ▲6.23 |
| Total valid votes | | 83,967 | | |
| Rejected ballots | | 4,074 | 4.63 | ▲2.79 |
| Registered electors | | 144,221 | | ▲25.97 |
| INC hold | | Swing | ▲6.47 | |

=== Assembly Election 1985 ===
1985 Karnataka Legislative Assembly election : Bijapur
| Party | Candidate | Votes | % | ±% |
|---|---|---|---|---|
| INC | Ustad Mehboob Patel | 29,488 | 47.86 | ▲4.22 |
| JP | Indikar Gousmohiddin Mahammadsab | 28,693 | 46.57 | ▲43.36 |
| BJP | Matapathi Mallayya Gurabasayya | 1,847 | 3.00 | ▼47.31 |
| Margin of victory | | 795 | 1.29 | ▼5.39 |
| Turnout | | 62,765 | 54.82 | ▼4.84 |
| Total valid votes | | 61,613 | | |
| Rejected ballots | | 1,152 | 1.84 | ▼0.37 |
| Registered electors | | 114,487 | | ▲16.72 |
| INC gain from BJP | | Swing | ▼2.45 | |

=== Assembly Election 1983 ===
1983 Karnataka Legislative Assembly election : Bijapur
| Party | Candidate | Votes | % | ±% |
|---|---|---|---|---|
| BJP | Gachinmath Chandrashekar Gurupadaya | 28,795 | 50.31 | New |
| INC | Jahagirdar Sayed Khajahuseni Sayed Jeelanisaheb | 24,974 | 43.64 | ▲41.65 |
| JP | Kaladgi Abdul Razak Mangalsab | 1,837 | 3.21 | ▼46.18 |
| Independent | Siddiqui Abdul Hai Mahaboobsab | 560 | 0.98 | New |
| Independent | Hirandagi Rajashekhar Sharanappa | 518 | 0.91 | New |
| Independent | Phatak Sudhabai Vishnupant | 403 | 0.70 | New |
| Margin of victory | | 3,821 | 6.68 | ▼11.29 |
| Turnout | | 58,524 | 59.66 | ▼3.95 |
| Total valid votes | | 57,233 | | |
| Rejected ballots | | 1,291 | 2.21 | ▼0.24 |
| Registered electors | | 98,091 | | ▲14.79 |
| BJP gain from JP | | Swing | ▲0.92 | |

=== Assembly Election 1978 ===
1978 Karnataka Legislative Assembly election : Bijapur
| Party | Candidate | Votes | % | ±% |
|---|---|---|---|---|
| JP | Bakshi Sayyad Habibuddin Shamanasaheb | 26,191 | 49.39 | New |
| INC(I) | Tathod Khubasing Teju | 16,663 | 31.43 | New |
| Independent | Jagitdar Sayyad Aminpeer Sayyad Mainoddin | 8,404 | 15.85 | New |
| INC | Patil Payappa Shivappa | 1,053 | 1.99 | ▼56.55 |
| Independent | Bidari Channabasappa Sayabanna | 446 | 0.84 | New |
| Margin of victory | | 9,528 | 17.97 | ▼5.33 |
| Turnout | | 54,358 | 63.61 | ▲4.71 |
| Total valid votes | | 53,024 | | |
| Rejected ballots | | 1,334 | 2.45 | ▲2.45 |
| Registered electors | | 85,453 | | ▲24.30 |
| JP gain from INC | | Swing | ▼9.15 | |

=== Assembly Election 1972 ===
1972 Mysore State Legislative Assembly election : Bijapur
| Party | Candidate | Votes | % | ±% |
|---|---|---|---|---|
| INC | K. T. Rathod | 23,205 | 58.54 | ▼9.28 |
| INC(O) | Pantdit Vishnu Keshava | 13,970 | 35.24 | New |
| Independent | B. Karibasappa Nagur | 1,469 | 3.71 | New |
| ABJS | B. Channappa Sayabanna | 593 | 1.50 | New |
| Margin of victory | | 9,235 | 23.30 | ▼25.07 |
| Turnout | | 40,494 | 58.90 | ▲4.92 |
| Total valid votes | | 39,639 | | |
| Registered electors | | 68,747 | | ▲25.81 |
| INC hold | | Swing | ▼9.28 | |

=== Assembly Election 1967 ===
1967 Mysore State Legislative Assembly election : Bijapur
| Party | Candidate | Votes | % | ±% |
|---|---|---|---|---|
| INC | P. B. Mallanagauda | 18,818 | 67.82 | ▲18.11 |
| Independent | N. D. S. B. Karabasappa | 5,396 | 19.45 | New |
| Independent | B. M. Hasansab | 3,534 | 12.74 | New |
| Margin of victory | | 13,422 | 48.37 | ▲16.08 |
| Turnout | | 29,497 | 53.98 | ▼6.51 |
| Total valid votes | | 27,748 | | |
| Registered electors | | 54,645 | | ▲8.52 |
| INC hold | | Swing | ▲18.11 | |

=== Assembly Election 1962 ===
1962 Mysore State Legislative Assembly election : Bijapur
| Party | Candidate | Votes | % | ±% |
|---|---|---|---|---|
| INC | Revansiddapa Sharanappa Navadagi | 13,828 | 49.71 | ▲15.33 |
| Independent | Nabisab Maktumsab Balasing | 4,846 | 17.42 | New |
| Lok Sewak Sangh | Sardar Basavaraj Karabasappa Nagur | 3,654 | 13.13 | New |
| Independent | Bhalachandra Vishnupant Parulekar | 1,835 | 6.60 | New |
| SWA | Khalilulha Abasaheb Janvekar | 1,415 | 5.09 | New |
| ABJS | Manohar Dhondiba Mahindrakar | 841 | 3.02 | New |
| Independent | Husen Sardarkhan Almel | 732 | 2.63 | New |
| RPI | Lakkappa Laxmanna Poti | 588 | 2.11 | New |
| Margin of victory | | 8,982 | 32.29 | ▲15.81 |
| Turnout | | 30,462 | 60.49 | ▲6.47 |
| Total valid votes | | 27,820 | | |
| Registered electors | | 50,357 | | ▲16.99 |
| INC gain from Independent | | Swing | ▼1.15 | |

=== Assembly Election 1957 ===
1957 Mysore State Legislative Assembly election : Bijapur
| Party | Candidate | Votes | % | ±% |
|---|---|---|---|---|
| Independent | Dr. Sardar Basavraj Nagur | 11,827 | 50.86 | New |
| INC | Madhaldar Gous Mohiddin Bandagi Saheb | 7,995 | 34.38 | ▼3.89 |
| CPI | Balsing Nabisa Muktumsa | 1,969 | 8.47 | New |
| ABJS | Mahindrakar Manohar Dhondiba | 1,206 | 5.19 | New |
| Independent | Shirivalmath Marulradhya Shastri Shantavirayya | 255 | 1.10 | New |
| Margin of victory | | 3,832 | 16.48 | ▲12.94 |
| Turnout | | 23,252 | 54.02 | |
| Total valid votes | | 23,252 | | |
| Registered electors | | 43,045 | | |
| Independent gain from INC | | Swing | ▲12.59 | |

=== Assembly By-election 1952 ===
1952 Bombay Legislative Assembly by-election : Bijapur
| Party | Candidate | Votes | % | ±% |
|---|---|---|---|---|
| INC | B. R. Sidalingappa | 9,825 | 38.27 | ▲0.03 |
| Independent | N. D. S. B. Karabasappa | 8,916 | 34.73 | New |
| Independent | Balsing Nabisa Muktumsa | 5,591 | 21.78 | New |
| Independent | P. S. Shiddangauda | 1,342 | 5.23 | New |
| Margin of victory | | 909 | 3.54 | ▼12.40 |
| Total valid votes | | 25,674 | | |
| INC hold | | Swing | ▲0.03 | |

=== Assembly Election 1952 ===
1952 Bombay State Legislative Assembly election : Bijapur
| Party | Candidate | Votes | % | ±% |
|---|---|---|---|---|
| INC | Patil Mallangauda Ramangauda | 10,406 | 38.24 | New |
| CPI | Balsing Nabisa Muktumsa | 6,069 | 22.30 | New |
| Independent | Kowjalgi Krishnarao Shriniwasrao | 4,390 | 16.13 | New |
| KMPP | Akki Basappa Dundappa | 3,309 | 12.16 | New |
| Independent | Nagur Basaviraj Karabasappa | 3,040 | 11.17 | New |
| Margin of victory | | 4,337 | 15.94 | |
| Turnout | | 27,214 | 50.65 | |
| Total valid votes | | 27,214 | | |
| Registered electors | | 53,734 | | |
| INC win (new seat) | | | | |
