= Vimalabai Deshmukh =

Indian politician

Minister for Women and Child Welfare Government of Karnataka
- In office 2 February 1998 - 7 October 1999
- Preceded by: B. T. Lalitha Naik
- Succeeded by: Motamma
- Constituency: Muddebihal

Member of Karnataka Legislative Assembly
- In office 26 November 1994 – 7 October 1999
- Preceded by: C. S. Nadagouda
- Succeeded by: C. S. Nadagouda
- Constituency: Muddebihal

Personal details
- Born: Vimalabai Somashekar Desai; 21 October 1949 Murgod, Sampgaon Taluk, Belgaum district, Bombay State (Now Bailhongal Taluk, Belgaum district, Karnataka)
- Died: 22 July 2018 (aged 68) Bijapur, Karnataka
- Party: Janata Dal (Secular) (2014 - 2018, 2003 - 2013)
- Other political affiliations: Karnataka Janata Paksha (2013 - 2014); Janata Dal (United) (1999 - 2003); Janata Dal (until 1999)
- Spouse: Jagadevarao Sanganabasappa Deshmukh (Till 1991, his death)
- Children: One daughter (Nandini Nilesh Deshmukh)

Vimalabai Jagadevarao Deshmukh who was also known as Vimalabai Deshmukh was an Indian politician who was a former Minister for Women and Child Welfare in the Government of Karnataka. She also served as a MLA to the Karnataka Legislative Assembly in 1994 from Muddebihal constituency in Bijapur district, Karnataka.

== Early life and personal life ==
She was born in Murgod village of Sampgaon Taluk in Belgaum district of then Bombay State (Now Bailhongal Taluk, Belgaum district, Karnataka) to Somashekar Desai and Shanthabai. She completed her schooling i.e., SSLC (Class 10) from Sri Mahantha Shikshana Samithi High School Muragoda in 1966. Later she married Jagadevarao Sanganabasappa Deshmukh, who went on to become a MLA to the Karnataka Legislative Assembly in 1978, 1983 and 1985 from Muddebihal constituency in Bijapur district, Karnataka. Her only daughter Nandini Deshmukh was married to Nilesh Deshmukh who was a former legislator of Maharashtra Legislative Assembly. Nilesh Deshmukh had won from Yavatmal seat in 2009 and was killed in 2013. Nandini Deshmukh came victorious from Yavatmal in By-elections conducted after her husband's death in 2013.

== Political career ==
She contested the Assembly election and was elected MLA of Muddebihal in 1994 Assembly elections defeating her nearest contestant C. S. Nadagouda and later entered J. H. Patel cabinet as Minister for Women and Child Welfare in 1998 after Vishwajit, a son of incumbent Minister B. T. Lalitha Naik was accused of defiling the statue of B.R. Ambedkar at B.R. Ambedkar Medical College, Bangalore. She remained in the position up to the end of term until 1999. After her term as Minister, she joined Janata Dal (United) and unsuccessfully contested 1999 elections from Muddebihal. Later she joined Janata Dal (Secular) to contest 2004 and 2008 from her traditional Muddebihal seat, but could not succeed to become a Member of the Legislative Assembly again. She was welcomed by B. S. Yediyurappa, who had floated a new Party Karnataka Janata Paksha during 2013 elections after she was denied a ticket by JD(S) and again unsuccessfully contested from Muddebihal seat. After elections, she returned to JD(S). Former Prime Minister H. D. Deve Gowda, then Minister for Women and Child Development and actress turned politician Jayamala, then Chief Minister H. D. Kumaraswamy and many others condoled her death. H. D. Kumaraswamy remembered her as an icon for women empowerment in the state.

== Death ==
After a prolonged illness, she died on 22 July 2018 in her Bijapur residence. She was survived by her three daughters.

== See also ==
- J. H. Patel cabinet
