= Ballolli Assembly constituency =

Former Assembly constituency in Karnataka, India

Coordinates: 17.235062°N 75.802397°E

Ballolli
- Former constituency No. 222 for the Karnataka Legislative Assembly

Constituency details
- Country: India
- Region: South India
- State: Karnataka
- Division: Belagavi
- District: Bijapur
- Lok Sabha constituency: Bijapur
- Established: 1967
- Abolished: 2008
- Reservation: SC

Ballolli Assembly constituency was one of the constituency in Karnataka state assembly in India until 2008 when it was made defunct. It was part of Bijapur Lok Sabha constituency.

== Members of the Legislative Assembly ==
Election	Member	Party
1967	Arakeri Siddharth Sangappa	Republican Party of India
1972	Kabade Jatteppa Laxman	Indian National Congress
1978	Arakeri Siddharth Sangappa	Janata Party
1983	Ramesh Jigajinagi	Janata Party
1985	Ramesh Jigajinagi	Janata Party
1989	Ainapur Manohar Umakant	Indian National Congress
1994	Ramesh Jigajinagi	Janata Dal
1998 By-election (Note: Resigned on 20/03/1998)	Almelkar Vilas Babu Basalingappa	Janata Dal
1999	Alugur H. R. (Raju)	Indian National Congress
2004	R. K. Rathod	Janata Dal

== Election results ==
=== Assembly Election 2004 ===
2004 Karnataka Legislative Assembly election : Ballolli
Party	Candidate	Votes	%	±%
JD(S)	R. K. Rathod	39,915	39.90%	▲9.19
INC	Alugur H R (Raju)	28,873	28.86%	▼4.99
BJP	Katakdhound Vithal Diondiba	27,448	27.44%	New
Kannada Nadu Party	Jigajinigi Parashuram Vasant	1,958	1.96%	New
Independent	Alakunte Prakash Tippanna	1,840	1.84%	New
Margin of victory		11,042	11.04%	▲7.89
Turnout		100,099	59.92%	▲2.61
Total valid votes		100,034		
Registered electors		167,066		▲12.43
JD(S) gain from INC		Swing	▲6.04	

=== Assembly Election 1999 ===
1999 Karnataka Legislative Assembly election : Ballolli
Party	Candidate	Votes	%	±%
INC	Alugur H R (Raju)	27,194	33.86%	▲10.98
JD(S)	R. K. Rathod	24,667	30.71%	New
JD(U)	Almelkar Vilas Babu Basalingappa	23,668	29.47%	New
Karnataka Rajya Ryota Sangha	Alakunte Prakash Tippanna	3,419	4.26%	▼16.87
BSP	Chalavadi Addappa Yamanappa	1,373	1.71%	New
Margin of victory		2,527	3.15%	▼11.71
Turnout		85,155	57.30%	▼1.79
Total valid votes		80,321		
Registered electors		148,600		▲14.19
INC gain from JD		Swing	▼3.88	

=== Assembly Election 1994 ===
1994 Karnataka Legislative Assembly election : Ballolli
Party	Candidate	Votes	%	±%
JD	Ramesh Jigajinagi	29,018	37.74%	▲3.73
INC	Chavan Phoolsing Narayan	17,591	22.88%	▼17.57
Karnataka Rajya Ryota Sangha	Gonasagi Suresh Somaning	16,245	21.13%	New
BJP	Katakdhound Vithal Diondiba	9,090	11.82%	New
Independent	Aakashi Praveen Basappa	3,256	4.23%	New
INC	Lamani Limbaji Parasu	851	1.11%	New
Independent	Banasode Rajashekhar Sidaraya	600	0.78%	New
Margin of victory		11,427	14.86%	▲8.42
Turnout		78,172	60.07%	▲0.86
Total valid votes		76,897		
Registered electors		130,134		▲10.32
JD gain from INC		Swing	▼2.71	

=== Assembly Election 1989 ===
1989 Karnataka Legislative Assembly election : Ballolli
Party	Candidate	Votes	%	±%
INC	Ainapur Manohar Umakant	27,782	40.44%	▲1.78
JD	Ramesh Jigajinagi	23,357	34.00%	New
Kranti Sabha	Shindhe Ravanasidda Jayappa	8,352	12.16%	New
JP	Dharamveer Damodar Bhavooraya	7,054	10.27%	▼48.45
Independent	Shrinivas Namdev Bandaspatti	583	0.85%	New
Independent	Kattimani Pralhad Husanappa	553	0.81%	New
RPI	Potadar Lakkappa Laxman	523	0.76%	New
Margin of victory		4,425	6.44%	▼13.61
Turnout		73,071	61.94%	▼1.32
Total valid votes		68,692		
Registered electors		117,965		▲27.47
INC gain from JP		Swing	▼18.27	

=== Assembly Election 1985 ===
1985 Karnataka Legislative Assembly election : Ballolli
Party	Candidate	Votes	%	±%
JP	Ramesh Jigajinagi	32,360	58.72%	▲8.45
INC	Kondaguli Dayanand Yallappa	21,311	38.67%	▲14.41
Independent	Potadar Lakkappa Laxman	1,048	1.90%	New
BJP	Sholapur Chandrahas Shivuba	392	0.71%	New
Margin of victory		11,049	20.05%	▼5.95
Turnout		56,158	60.68%	▲0.97
Total valid votes		55,111		
Registered electors		92,542		▲10.77
JP hold		Swing	▲8.45	

=== Assembly Election 1983 ===
1983 Karnataka Legislative Assembly election : Ballolli
Party	Candidate	Votes	%	±%
JP	Ramesh Jigajinagi	24,603	50.26%	▼7.45
INC	Arakeri Siddharth Sangappa	11,876	24.26%	▲17.58
Independent	Kabade Jetteppa Laxmannna	11,555	23.61%	New
Independent	Talakeri Shankar Laxman	364	0.74%	New
Margin of victory		12,727	26.00%	▲3.89
Turnout		50,099	59.97%	▲7.65
Total valid votes		48,948		
Registered electors		83,547		▲6.67
JP hold		Swing	▼7.45	

=== Assembly Election 1978 ===
1978 Karnataka Legislative Assembly election : Ballolli
Party	Candidate	Votes	%	±%
JP	Arakeri Siddharth Sangappa	23,023	57.71%	New
INC(I)	Hosamani Chandrashekhar Kasappa	14,204	35.60%	New
INC	Gadiwaddar Hanamant Mukund	2,667	6.69%	▼30.92
Margin of victory		8,819	22.11%	▲7.56
Turnout		41,023	52.38%	▲4.95
Total valid votes		39,894		
Registered electors		78,321		▲20.90
JP gain from INC(O)		Swing	▲5.56	

=== Assembly Election 1972 ===
1972 Mysore State Legislative Assembly election : Ballolli
Party	Candidate	Votes	%	±%
INC(O)	Kabade Jatteppa Laxman	15,537	52.16%	New
INC	Hujure Baburao Rama	11,204	37.61%	▼4.68
Independent	Kale Revappa Somappa	2,120	7.12%	New
Independent	K. S. Hanamantrao	649	2.18%	New
ABJS	C. I. Chandrappa	280	0.94%	New
Margin of victory		4,333	14.55%	▼0.87
Turnout		30,709	47.41%	▲0.18
Total valid votes		29,790		
Registered electors		64,780		▲16.88
INC(O) gain from RPI		Swing	▼5.55	

=== Assembly Election 1967 ===
1967 Mysore State Legislative Assembly election : Ballolli
Party	Candidate	Votes	%	±%
RPI	Arakeri Siddharth Sangappa	14,653	57.71%	New
INC	K. J. Laxman	10,738	42.29%	New
Margin of victory		3,915	15.42%	
Turnout		27,323	49.30%	
Total valid votes		25,391		
Registered electors		55,426		
RPI win (new seat)				

== See also ==
- List of constituencies of the Karnataka Legislative Assembly
