= Bijapur City Assembly constituency =

Constituency of the Karnataka legislative assembly in India

Coordinates: 16.83°N 75.72°E

Bijapur City
- Constituency No. 30 for the Karnataka Legislative Assembly

Constituency details
- Country: India
- Region: South India
- State: Karnataka
- District: Bijapur
- Lok Sabha constituency: Bijapur
- Established: 2008
- Total electors: 2,81,726
- Reservation: None

Member of Legislative Assembly
- 16th Karnataka Legislative Assembly
- Incumbent Basangouda Patil Yatnal
- Party: Bharatiya Janata Party
- Elected year: 2018

Bijapur City Assembly constituency is one of 224 assembly constituencies of the Indian state of Karnataka. The constituency was previously known as Bijapur constituency which was readjusted in 2008 on the implementation of the Delimitation Commission of 2002. The constituency was a part of Bombay State before the States Reorganisation Act, 1956. It is part of Bijapur Lok Sabha constituency.

== Members of the Legislative Assembly ==
Election	Member	Party
2008	Appu Pattanshetty	Bharatiya Janata Party
2013	Makbul S Bagawan	Indian National Congress
2018	Basangouda Patil Yatnal	Bharatiya Janata Party
2023	Basangouda Patil Yatnal	Bharatiya Janata Party

== Election results ==
=== Assembly Election 2023 ===
2023 Karnataka Legislative Assembly election : Bijapur City
Party	Candidate	Votes	%	±%
BJP	Basangouda Patil Yatnal	94,201	51.46	▲1.16
INC	Abdul Hameed Khajasab Musharif	85,978	46.97	▲0.90
NOTA	None of the above	994	0.54	▼0.38
Margin of victory		8,223	4.49	▲0.26
Turnout		184,306	65.42	▲3.41
Total valid votes		183,047		
Registered electors		281,726		▲13.93
BJP hold		Swing	▲1.16	

=== Assembly Election 2018 ===
2018 Karnataka Legislative Assembly election : Bijapur City
Party	Candidate	Votes	%	±%
BJP	Basangouda Patil Yatnal	76,308	50.30	▲31.56
INC	Abdul Hameed Khajasab Musharif	69,895	46.07	▲11.35
JD(S)	Bellubbi Sangappa Kallappa	2,083	1.37	▼26.65
NOTA	None of the above	1,399	0.92	New
Margin of victory		6,413	4.23	▼2.47
Turnout		153,333	62.01	▲5.68
Total valid votes		151,703		
Registered electors		247,287		▲16.76
BJP gain from INC		Swing	▲15.58	

=== Assembly Election 2013 ===
2013 Karnataka Legislative Assembly election : Bijapur City
Party	Candidate	Votes	%	±%
INC	Makbul S Bagawan	48,615	34.72	▲14.55
JD(S)	Basangouda Patil Yatnal	39,235	28.02	▲9.01
BJP	Appu Pattanshetty	26,235	18.74	▼22.71
KJP	Karibasavaraj Basavaraj Nagur (babu)	1,054	0.75	New
Margin of victory		9,380	6.70	▼14.57
Turnout		119,311	56.33	▲7.62
Total valid votes		140,024		
Registered electors		211,791		▲24.84
INC gain from BJP		Swing	▼6.73	

=== Assembly Election 2008 ===
2008 Karnataka Legislative Assembly election : Bijapur City
Party	Candidate	Votes	%	±%
BJP	Appu Pattanshetty	34,217	41.45	New
INC	Horti Sahebmoddin Abdularahiman	16,653	20.17	New
JD(S)	Mahabari Bandenawaj Hussainsab	15,696	19.01	New
Independent	Ishwaragoud Ramanagoud Patil (yatnal)	6,873	8.33	New
Independent	Bidanur Ramesh Hanamant	2,217	2.69	New
Independent	Mashyalkar Mammad Akram (ahind)	1,447	1.75	New
BSP	Rajugoud Nanagoud Patil (kannur)	1,412	1.71	New
Independent	Mangalavedhe Vijayakumar Shivappa	955	1.16	New
Margin of victory		17,564	21.27	
Turnout		82,634	48.71	
Total valid votes		82,558		
Registered electors		169,652		
BJP win (new seat)				
