= Tikota Assembly constituency =

Former Assembly constituency in Karnataka, India

Coordinates: 16.842262°N 75.520305°E

Tikota
- Former constituency No. 220 for the Karnataka Legislative Assembly

Constituency details
- Country: India
- Region: South India
- State: Karnataka
- Division: Belagavi
- District: Bijapur
- Lok Sabha constituency: Bijapur
- Established: 1957
- Abolished: 2008
- Reservation: None

Tikota Assembly constituency was one of the constituencies in Karnataka state assembly in India until 2008 when it was made defunct. It was part of Bijapur Lok Sabha constituency.

== Members of the Legislative Assembly ==
Election	Member	Party
1952	Ambli Chanbasappa Jagdevappa	Indian National Congress
1957	Ambli Chanbasappa Jagdevappa	Indian National Congress
1962	Patil Basanagouda Mallanagouda	Indian National Congress
1967	V. S. Basalingayya	Indian National Congress
1972	G. N. Patil	Indian National Congress
1978	Patil Badugouda Bapugouda	Janata Party
1983	Patil Basanagouda Mallanagouda	Indian National Congress
1985	Patil Basanagouda Mallanagouda	Indian National Congress
1989	Patil Basanagouda Mallanagouda	Indian National Congress
1990 By-election	Patil Basanagouda Mallanagouda	Indian National Congress
1994	Shivanand Patil	Janata Dal
1999	Shivanand Patil	Bharatiya Janata Party
2004	Patil Basanagouda Mallanagouda	Indian National Congress

== Election results ==
=== Assembly Election 2004 ===
2004 Karnataka Legislative Assembly election : Tikota
Party	Candidate	Votes	%	±%
INC	Patil Basanagouda Mallanagouda	48,274	53.77%	▲8.65
JD(U)	Rudragoudar Mallangouda Sahebagouda	19,040	21.21%	New
JD(S)	Edave Jakkappa Subhan	8,645	9.63%	▲9.07
SS	Govind Ramachandra Shiroolkar	4,184	4.66%	New
Independent	Subhasagowda Siddanagowda Patil	3,580	3.99%	New
Urs Samyuktha Paksha	Laxman Tatuba Jadhav	2,103	2.34%	New
JP	Patil Rajendra Goudar Rudragouda	1,598	1.78%	New
Independent	Kalavatishankar Nayak	887	0.99%	New
Kannada Nadu Party	Biradar Annappa Bhimappa	843	0.94%	New
Margin of victory		29,234	32.56%	▲24.51
Turnout		89,998	58.06%	▼10.94
Total valid votes		89,778		
Registered electors		155,003		▲11.94
INC gain from BJP		Swing	▲0.60	

=== Assembly Election 1999 ===
1999 Karnataka Legislative Assembly election : Tikota
Party	Candidate	Votes	%	±%
BJP	Shivanand Patil	49,080	53.17%	▲51.92
INC	Patil Basanagouda Mallanagouda	41,649	45.12%	▲12.43
BSP	Amani Pundalik Kiru	954	1.03%	New
Margin of victory		7,431	8.05%	▼23.24
Turnout		95,546	69.00%	▲2.25
Total valid votes		92,312		
Rejected ballots		3,180	3.33%	▲1.43
Registered electors		138,464		▲14.43
BJP gain from JD		Swing	▼10.81	

=== Assembly Election 1994 ===
1994 Karnataka Legislative Assembly election : Tikota
Party	Candidate	Votes	%	±%
JD	Shivanand Patil	50,679	63.98%	New
INC	Patil Basanagouda Mallanagouda	25,897	32.69%	New
BJP	Basavaraj Mukartihal	991	1.25%	New
KRRS	Hoonur Shivalingappa Shiddappa	892	1.13%	New
INC	L. Malleshi Limbaji	477	0.60%	New
Margin of victory		24,782	31.29%	
Turnout		80,761	66.75%	
Total valid votes		79,208		
Rejected ballots		1,533	1.90%	
Registered electors		120,998		
JD gain from INC		Swing		

=== Assembly By-election 1990 ===
1990 Karnataka Legislative Assembly by-election : Tikota
Party	Candidate	Votes	%	±%
INC	Patil Basanagouda Mallanagouda			
INC hold		Swing	▼53.04	

=== Assembly Election 1989 ===
1989 Karnataka Legislative Assembly election : Tikota
Party	Candidate	Votes	%	±%
INC	Patil Basanagouda Mallanagouda	37,832	53.04%	▲4.25
JD	Basanagouda Rudragouda Patil	33,228	46.59%	New
Margin of victory		4,604	6.45%	▲4.79
Turnout		74,001	67.95%	▲1.08
Total valid votes		71,327		
Rejected ballots		2,674	3.61%	▲1.60
Registered electors		108,902		▲29.79
INC hold		Swing	▲4.25	

=== Assembly Election 1985 ===
1985 Karnataka Legislative Assembly election : Tikota
Party	Candidate	Votes	%	±%
INC	Patil Basanagouda Mallanagouda	26,829	48.79%	▼9.52
JP	Basanagouda Rudragouda Patil	25,914	47.13%	▲9.29
CPI(M)	Bhimsi Hanamant Kaledagt	1,374	2.50%	New
Independent	Pattar Kasipati Kalappa	438	0.80%	New
Margin of victory		915	1.66%	▼18.82
Turnout		56,114	66.87%	▲1.50
Total valid votes		54,987		
Rejected ballots		1,127	2.01%	▼0.62
Registered electors		83,909		▲11.70
INC hold		Swing	▼9.52	

=== Assembly Election 1983 ===
1983 Karnataka Legislative Assembly election : Tikota
Party	Candidate	Votes	%	±%
INC	Patil Basanagouda Mallanagouda	27,884	58.31%	▲56.94
JP	Kotihal Basagond Mallapapa	18,092	37.84%	▼14.23
RPI	Jambigi Sanjivappa Yamanappa	633	1.32%	New
Independent	Jamadar Gouspir Abbasaheb	619	1.29%	New
Independent	Godihal Ikatiyarrab Lalasab	345	0.72%	New
Margin of victory		9,792	20.48%	▲9.69
Turnout		49,111	65.37%	▲4.94
Total valid votes		47,817		
Rejected ballots		1,294	2.63%	▼1.03
Registered electors		75,122		▲6.83
INC gain from JP		Swing	▲6.24	

=== Assembly Election 1978 ===
1978 Karnataka Legislative Assembly election : Tikota
Party	Candidate	Votes	%	±%
JP	Patil Badugouda Bapugouda	21,317	52.07%	New
INC(I)	Shivaram Adiveppa Jiddi	16,899	41.28%	New
Independent	Tungal Badureddy Venkareddy	1,461	3.57%	New
RPI(K)	Mikihal Laxmikant Sidramappa	703	1.72%	New
INC	Lnininggond Siddappa	560	1.37%	▼37.04
Margin of victory		4,418	10.79%	▼10.81
Turnout		42,496	60.43%	▲4.76
Total valid votes		40,940		
Rejected ballots		1,556	3.66%	▲3.66
Registered electors		70,321		▲2.30
JP gain from INC(O)		Swing	▼7.94	

=== Assembly Election 1972 ===
1972 Mysore State Legislative Assembly election : Tikota
Party	Candidate	Votes	%	±%
INC(O)	G. N. Patil	22,119	60.01%	New
INC	Shivaram Adiveppa Jiddi	14,156	38.41%	▼31.15
ABJS	M. G. Chandramappa	584	1.58%	New
Margin of victory		7,963	21.60%	▼33.68
Turnout		38,271	55.67%	▲12.81
Total valid votes		36,859		
Registered electors		68,741		▲17.61
INC(O) gain from INC		Swing	▼9.55	

=== Assembly Election 1967 ===
1967 Mysore State Legislative Assembly election : Tikota
Party	Candidate	Votes	%	±%
INC	V. S. Basalingayya	16,329	69.56%	▼13.66
CPI(M)	N. K. Upadhayaya	3,353	14.28%	New
Independent	L. L. Poti	1,998	8.51%	New
Independent	K. K. Sangappa	1,794	7.64%	New
Margin of victory		12,976	55.28%	▼11.16
Turnout		25,051	42.86%	▼8.65
Total valid votes		23,474		
Registered electors		58,446		▲18.67
INC hold		Swing	▼13.66	

=== Assembly Election 1962 ===
1962 Mysore State Legislative Assembly election : Tikota
Party	Candidate	Votes	%	±%
INC	Patil Basanagouda Mallanagouda	19,957	83.22%	▲22.20
SWA	Bhimangouda Gurupadappa Biradar	4,024	16.78%	New
Margin of victory		15,933	66.44%	▲44.40
Turnout		25,368	51.51%	▼1.37
Total valid votes		23,981		
Registered electors		49,249		▲22.88
INC hold		Swing	▲22.20	

=== Assembly Election 1957 ===
1957 Mysore State Legislative Assembly election : Tikota
Party	Candidate	Votes	%	±%
INC	Ambli Chanbasappa Jagdevappa	12,933	61.02%	▼1.59
Independent	Nagur Dr. Sardar Basavraj	8,262	38.98%	New
Margin of victory		4,671	22.04%	▼13.79
Turnout		21,195	52.88%	▼8.46
Total valid votes		21,195		
Registered electors		40,080		▼26.84
INC hold		Swing	▼1.59	

=== Assembly Election 1952 ===
1952 Bombay State Legislative Assembly election : Tikota Bilgi
Party	Candidate	Votes	%	±%
INC	Ambli Chanbasappa Jagdevappa	21,042	62.61%	New
KMPP	Patil Rayongouda Madwailappa	9,001	26.78%	New
Independent	Patil Basangauda Shivangauda	3,565	10.61%	New
Margin of victory		12,041	35.83%	
Turnout		33,608	61.34%	
Total valid votes		33,608		
Registered electors		54,787		
INC win (new seat)				

== See also ==
- List of constituencies of the Karnataka Legislative Assembly
