= Basavana Bagevadi Assembly constituency =

Constituency of the Karnataka legislative assembly in India

Coordinates: 16.57°N 75.97°E

Basavana Bagevadi
- Constituency No. 28 for the Karnataka Legislative Assembly

Constituency details
- Country: India
- Region: South India
- State: Karnataka
- District: Bijapur
- Lok Sabha constituency: Bijapur
- Established: 1951
- Total electors: 210,088
- Reservation: None

Member of Legislative Assembly
- 16th Karnataka Legislative Assembly
- Incumbent Shivanand Patil
- Party: Indian National Congress
- Elected year: 2023
- Preceded by: S. K. Bellubbi

Basavana Bagevadi Assembly constituency is one of 224 assembly constituencies in Karnataka in India. It is part of Bijapur Lok Sabha constituency.

== Members of the Legislative Assembly ==
Election	Member	Party
1957	Sushilabai Hirachand Shah	Indian National Congress
1962	Sushilabai Hirachand Shah	Indian National Congress
1967	Somanagouda Basanagouda Patil	Indian National Congress
1972	Somanagouda Basanagouda Patil	Indian National Congress
1978	Somanagouda Basanagouda Patil	Janata Party
1983	Somanagouda Basanagouda Patil	Indian National Congress
1985	Kumaragouda Adiveppagouda Patil	Janata Party
1989	Somanagouda Basanagouda Patil	Indian National Congress
1994	Somanagouda Basanagouda Patil	Indian National Congress
1999	Bellubbi Sangappa Kallappa	Bharatiya Janata Party
2004	Shivanand Patil	Indian National Congress
2008	Bellubbi Sangappa Kallappa	Bharatiya Janata Party
2013	Shivanand Patil	Indian National Congress
2018	Shivanand Patil	Indian National Congress
2023	Shivanand Patil	Indian National Congress

== Election results ==
=== Assembly Election 2023 ===
2023 Karnataka Legislative Assembly election : Basavana Bagevadi
Party	Candidate	Votes	%	±%
INC	Shivanand Patil	68,126	43.00%	▲3.21
BJP	Bellubbi Sangappa Kallappa	43,263	27.30%	▲10.00
JD(S)	Appugouda. Urf Somanagouda. Basanagouda Patil	40,197	25.37%	▼12.26
AIMIM	Allahbaksh Bijapur	1,475	0.93%	New
Independent	Laxmimbai S. G. Patil	1,050	0.66%	New
NOTA	None of the above	838	0.53%	▼0.61
Margin of victory		24,863	15.69%	▲13.53
Turnout		159,602	75.97%	▲2.70
Total valid votes		158,446		
Registered electors		210,088		▲4.38
INC hold		Swing	▲3.21	

=== Assembly Election 2018 ===
2018 Karnataka Legislative Assembly election : Basavana Bagevadi
Party	Candidate	Votes	%	±%
INC	Shivanand Patil	58,647	39.79%	▼4.63
JD(S)	Somanagouda(appugouda) B. Patil(managuli)	55,461	37.63%	▲23.33
BJP	Sangaraj Desai	25,501	17.30%	▼11.60
Independent	Yallappa Basappa Gundakarajagi	3,008	2.04%	New
Independent	Laxmimbai S. G. Patil	1,252	0.85%	New
Jana Samanyara Party (Karnataka)	Alur Ninganna Mallappa	904	0.61%	New
NOTA	None of the above	1,684	1.14%	New
Margin of victory		3,186	2.16%	▼13.36
Turnout		147,472	73.27%	▲1.09
Total valid votes		147,404		
Registered electors		201,271		▲14.45
INC hold		Swing	▼4.63	

=== Assembly Election 2013 ===
2013 Karnataka Legislative Assembly election : Basavana Bagevadi
Party	Candidate	Votes	%	±%
INC	Shivanand Patil	56,329	44.42%	▲11.22
BJP	Bellubbi Sangappa Kallappa	36,653	28.90%	▼17.63
JD(S)	Somanagouda (appugouda) B. Patil	18,136	14.30%	▼0.45
KJP	Desai Sangraj Annasaheb	9,834	7.75%	New
Independent	Siddappa. B. Ganji	1,259	0.99%	New
BSP	Katti Mariyappa Chandramappa	1,079	0.85%	▼1.20
BSRCP	Gopal Shivappa Dhanashetty	1,035	0.82%	New
Margin of victory		19,676	15.52%	▲2.19
Turnout		126,939	72.18%	▲7.43
Total valid votes		126,819		
Registered electors		175,856		▲9.26
INC gain from BJP		Swing	▼2.11	

=== Assembly Election 2008 ===
2008 Karnataka Legislative Assembly election : Basavana Bagevadi
Party	Candidate	Votes	%	±%
BJP	Bellubbi Sangappa Kallappa	48,481	46.53%	▲1.26
INC	Shivanand Patil	34,594	33.20%	▼15.26
JD(S)	Somanagouda Basanagouda Patil	15,370	14.75%	▲11.84
LJP	Dundasi Nazeer. M	3,615	3.47%	New
BSP	Yaranal Rajashekhar. C	2,133	2.05%	New
Margin of victory		13,887	13.33%	▲10.14
Turnout		104,215	64.75%	▲1.20
Total valid votes		104,193		
Registered electors		160,950		▼1.39
BJP gain from INC		Swing	▼1.93	

=== Assembly Election 2004 ===
2004 Karnataka Legislative Assembly election : Basavana Bagevadi
Party	Candidate	Votes	%	±%
INC	Shivanand Patil	50,238	48.46%	▲5.25
BJP	Bellubbi Sangappa Kallappa	46,933	45.27%	▼8.67
Kannada Nadu Party	Yaranal Shashidhar Adiveppa	3,481	3.36%	New
JD(S)	Domanal Ramappa Siddappa	3,012	2.91%	New
Margin of victory		3,305	3.19%	▼7.54
Turnout		103,726	63.55%	▼3.65
Total valid votes		103,664		
Registered electors		163,223		▲12.62
INC gain from BJP		Swing	▼5.48	

=== Assembly Election 1999 ===
1999 Karnataka Legislative Assembly election : Basavana Bagevadi
Party	Candidate	Votes	%	±%
BJP	Bellubbi Sangappa Kallappa	50,543	53.94%	▲37.83
INC	Somanagouda Basanagouda Patil	40,487	43.21%	▲7.58
BSP	Chalawadi Bhagawanth Basappa	1,678	1.79%	New
Margin of victory		10,056	10.73%	▲0.02
Turnout		97,401	67.20%	▲4.83
Total valid votes		93,708		
Rejected ballots		3,667	3.76%	▲0.68
Registered electors		144,938		▲13.27
BJP gain from INC		Swing	▲18.31	

=== Assembly Election 1994 ===
1994 Karnataka Legislative Assembly election : Basavana Bagevadi
Party	Candidate	Votes	%	±%
INC	Somanagouda Basanagouda Patil	27,557	35.63%	▼17.08
JD	Kumaragouda Adiveppagouda Patil	19,270	24.91%	▼10.22
INC	Bellubbi Sangappa Kallappa	13,327	17.23%	New
BJP	Chikkond Sanganagoud Kallanagouda	12,463	16.11%	▲12.17
Karnataka Rajya Ryota Sangha	Salunke Maruti Dondiba	2,523	3.26%	New
Independent	Patil Basangouda Dharappagouda	1,257	1.63%	New
Independent	Veera Mahanteshwars Swamiji	731	0.95%	New
Margin of victory		8,287	10.71%	▼6.87
Turnout		79,805	62.37%	▼1.70
Total valid votes		77,344		
Rejected ballots		2,461	3.08%	▼2.58
Registered electors		127,953		▲7.65
INC hold		Swing	▼17.08	

=== Assembly Election 1989 ===
1989 Karnataka Legislative Assembly election : Basavana Bagevadi
Party	Candidate	Votes	%	±%
INC	Somanagouda Basanagouda Patil	37,868	52.71%	▲10.35
JD	Kumaragouda Adiveppagouda Patil	25,235	35.13%	New
JP	Domanal Ramappa Siddappa	4,886	6.80%	New
BJP	Nalatwad Shivabasappa Rachappa	2,834	3.94%	▼1.39
Independent	Pattar Kashipati Kalappa	625	0.87%	New
Margin of victory		12,633	17.58%	▲7.63
Turnout		76,150	64.07%	▲2.44
Total valid votes		71,841		
Rejected ballots		4,309	5.66%	▲3.16
Registered electors		118,863		▲27.43
INC gain from JP		Swing	▲0.40	

=== Assembly Election 1985 ===
1985 Karnataka Legislative Assembly election : Basavana Bagevadi
Party	Candidate	Votes	%	±%
JP	Kumaragouda Adiveppagouda Patil	29,320	52.31%	New
INC	Patil Bimanagouda Thimmanagoud	23,744	42.36%	▼26.46
BJP	Bistagond Muttappa Ningappa	2,989	5.33%	▼25.85
Margin of victory		5,576	9.95%	▼27.70
Turnout		57,491	61.63%	▲1.70
Total valid votes		56,053		
Rejected ballots		1,438	2.50%	▼1.41
Registered electors		93,277		▲7.50
JP gain from INC		Swing	▼16.51	

=== Assembly Election 1983 ===
1983 Karnataka Legislative Assembly election : Basavana Bagevadi
Party	Candidate	Votes	%	±%
INC	Somanagouda Basanagouda Patil	34,386	68.82%	▲63.52
BJP	Pattanashetti Rajashekhar Viragondappa	15,577	31.18%	New
Margin of victory		18,809	37.65%	▲14.26
Turnout		51,997	59.93%	▼3.22
Total valid votes		49,963		
Rejected ballots		2,034	3.91%	▲0.95
Registered electors		86,767		▲5.76
INC gain from JP		Swing	▲13.51	

=== Assembly Election 1978 ===
1978 Karnataka Legislative Assembly election : Basavana Bagevadi
Party	Candidate	Votes	%	±%
JP	Somanagouda Basanagouda Patil	27,806	55.31%	New
INC(I)	Patil Basavantraya Ninganagouda Sulibhavi Ramesh Ningappa	16,048	31.92%	New
INC	Sulibhavi Ramesh Ningappa	2,666	5.30%	▼34.82
Independent	Pattanashetti Manamallappa Irappa	1,829	3.64%	New
Independent	Bellubbi Raghavendrarao Bhimacharya	1,064	2.12%	New
Independent	Bidari Gopal Ramappa	862	1.71%	New
Margin of victory		11,758	23.39%	▲6.57
Turnout		51,806	63.15%	▼0.63
Total valid votes		50,275		
Rejected ballots		1,531	2.96%	▲2.96
Registered electors		82,040		▲23.76
JP gain from INC(O)		Swing	▼1.63	

=== Assembly Election 1972 ===
1972 Mysore State Legislative Assembly election : Basavana Bagevadi
Party	Candidate	Votes	%	±%
INC(O)	Somanagouda Basanagouda Patil	23,061	56.94%	New
INC	G. V. Patil	16,250	40.12%	▼50.00
ABJS	Bidari Gopal Ramappa	1,193	2.95%	New
Margin of victory		6,811	16.82%	▼63.42
Turnout		42,276	63.78%	▲12.03
Total valid votes		40,504		
Registered electors		66,289		▲15.83
INC(O) gain from INC		Swing	▼33.18	

=== Assembly Election 1967 ===
1967 Mysore State Legislative Assembly election : Basavana Bagevadi
Party	Candidate	Votes	%	±%
INC	Somanagouda Basanagouda Patil	25,173	90.12%	▲38.55
Independent	G. B. Irayya	2,759	9.88%	New
Margin of victory		22,414	80.24%	▲55.07
Turnout		29,617	51.75%	▼0.60
Total valid votes		27,932		
Registered electors		57,230		▲16.72
INC hold		Swing	▲38.55	

=== Assembly Election 1962 ===
1962 Mysore State Legislative Assembly election : Basavana Bagevadi
Party	Candidate	Votes	%	±%
INC	Sushilabai Hirachand Shah	11,941	51.57%	▼0.12
Independent	Ramangouda Gurappa Patil	6,113	26.40%	New
Independent	Maktumsa Aminsa Pinjar	2,133	9.21%	New
RPI	Sangappa Gangawwa Janakar	1,110	4.79%	New
ABJS	Gurasangappa Chandramappa Malagar	1,095	4.73%	New
Independent	Changouda Shidalingappa Patil	765	3.30%	New
Margin of victory		5,828	25.17%	▼6.11
Turnout		25,665	52.35%	▲1.33
Total valid votes		23,157		
Registered electors		49,030		▲4.56
INC hold		Swing	▼0.12	

=== Assembly Election 1957 ===
1957 Mysore State Legislative Assembly election : Basavana Bagevadi
Party	Candidate	Votes	%	±%
INC	Sushilabai Hirachand Shah	12,365	51.69%	New
Independent	Kallur Ramanna Basappa	4,883	20.41%	New
Independent	Patil Basangouda Shamraya	4,101	17.14%	New
ABJS	Gurasangappa Chandramappa Malagar	2,574	10.76%	New
Margin of victory		7,482	31.28%	
Turnout		23,923	51.02%	
Total valid votes		23,923		
Registered electors		46,891		
INC win (new seat)				

== See also ==
List of constituencies of the Karnataka Legislative Assembly
