= Muddebihal Assembly constituency =

Constituency of the Karnataka legislative assembly in India

Coordinates: 16.34°N 76.13°E

Muddebihal
- Constituency No. 26 for the Karnataka Legislative Assembly

Constituency details
- Country: India
- Region: South India
- State: Karnataka
- District: Bijapur
- Lok Sabha constituency: Bijapur
- Established: 1951
- Total electors: 217,281
- Reservation: None

Member of Legislative Assembly
- 16th Karnataka Legislative Assembly
- Incumbent C. S. Nadagouda
- Party: Indian National Congress
- Elected year: 2023
- Preceded by: A. S. Patil

Muddebihal Assembly constituency is one of 224 assembly constituencies in Karnataka, in India. It is part of Bijapur Lok Sabha constituency.

== Members of the Legislative Assembly ==
Election	Member	Party
1952	Pranesh Sidhanti	Indian National Congress
1957	Pranesh Sidhanti	Indian National Congress
1962	Pranesh Sidhanti	Indian National Congress
1967	G. S. Mallappa	Indian National Congress
1972	S. M. Murigeppa	Indian National Congress
1978	Jagadevarao Deshmukh	Janata Party
1983	Jagadevarao Deshmukh	Janata Party
1985	Jagadevarao Deshmukh	Janata Party
1989	C. S. Nadagouda	Indian National Congress
1994	Vimalabai Deshmukh	Janata Dal
1999	C. S. Nadagouda	Indian National Congress
2004	C. S. Nadagouda	Indian National Congress
2008	C. S. Nadagouda	Indian National Congress
2013	C. S. Nadagouda	Indian National Congress
2018	A. S. Patil (Nadahalli)	Bharatiya Janata Party
2023	C. S. Nadagouda	Indian National Congress

== Election results ==
=== Assembly Election 2023 ===
2023 Karnataka Legislative Assembly election : Muddebihal
Party	Candidate	Votes	%	±%
INC	C. S. Nadagouda	79,483	51.27%	▲11.73
BJP	A. S. Patil (Nadahalli)	71,846	46.35%	▲0.59
NOTA	None of the above	1,234	0.80%	▼0.13
Margin of victory		7,637	4.93%	▼1.29
Turnout		156,057	71.82%	▲4.23
Total valid votes		155,021		
Registered electors		217,281		▲5.63
INC gain from BJP		Swing	▲5.51	

=== Assembly Election 2018 ===
2018 Karnataka Legislative Assembly election : Muddebihal
Party	Candidate	Votes	%	±%
BJP	A. S. Patil (Nadahalli)	63,512	45.76%	▲37.25
INC	C. S. Nadagouda	54,879	39.54%	▲9.25
JD(S)	Mangaladevi Biradar	9,845	7.09%	▼3.57
Namma Congress	V. P. Rakshith	3,093	2.23%	New
Jana Samanyara Party (Karnataka)	Ayyappa Dore	2,981	2.15%	New
NOTA	None of the above	1,295	0.93%	New
Margin of victory		8,633	6.22%	▼4.42
Turnout		139,034	67.59%	▲1.66
Total valid votes		138,798		
Registered electors		205,694		▲18.06
BJP gain from INC		Swing	▲15.47	

=== Assembly Election 2013 ===
2013 Karnataka Legislative Assembly election : Muddebihal
Party	Candidate	Votes	%	±%
INC	C. S. Nadagouda	34,747	30.29%	▲5.32
KJP	Vimalabai Deshmukh	22,545	19.65%	New
Independent	Shanthgouda Sanganagouda Patil Nadahalli	18,859	16.44%	New
JD(S)	Desai Prabhu Urf Prabhugouda Channanna	12,227	10.66%	▼4.63
BJP	Malakendragouda Basanagouda Patil	9,761	8.51%	▼13.97
BSRCP	Bapparagi Ningappagouda Siddappagouda	9,136	7.96%	New
Independent	Mahiboob Shamsuddin Halli	2,875	2.51%	New
Independent	Hanamanthray Ningappa Biradar	1,869	1.63%	New
Independent	Kori Shivasangappa Ramappa	941	0.82%	New
Margin of victory		12,202	10.64%	▲8.15
Turnout		114,865	65.93%	▲4.79
Total valid votes		114,726		
Registered electors		174,232		▲10.54
INC hold		Swing	▲5.32	

=== Assembly Election 2008 ===
2008 Karnataka Legislative Assembly election : Muddebihal
Party	Candidate	Votes	%	±%
INC	C. S. Nadagouda	24,065	24.97%	▼11.42
BJP	Biradar Mangala Shantagoudru	21,662	22.48%	▼2.43
JD(S)	Vimalabai Jagadevarao Deshamukha	14,739	15.29%	▼18.18
BSP	Bapparagi Ningappagouda Siddappagouda	14,286	14.82%	New
SP	Mahantappagouda Siddappagouda Patil	10,790	11.20%	New
Independent	Kashimpatel Husenpatel Patil	5,919	6.14%	New
Independent	Sewalal Somashekhar Purappa	2,819	2.93%	New
Independent	Desai Yalagurdappa Chandrappa	1,231	1.28%	New
Independent	Bhosale Babasaheb Annaji	856	0.89%	New
Margin of victory		2,403	2.49%	▼0.43
Turnout		96,376	61.14%	▼0.59
Total valid votes		96,367		
Registered electors		157,624		▲17.10
INC hold		Swing	▼11.42	

=== Assembly Election 2004 ===
2004 Karnataka Legislative Assembly election : Muddebihal
Party	Candidate	Votes	%	±%
INC	C. S. Nadagouda	30,203	36.39%	▼20.84
JD(S)	Vimalabai Deshmukh	27,776	33.47%	New
BJP	Mangaladevi Shantegowda	20,669	24.91%	New
JP	Dr. Goutam R. Choudhari	2,193	2.64%	New
Independent	Mallaraddappagouda Tipparaddappa (Khanapur) Havaragi	1,164	1.40%	New
Kannada Nadu Party	Chiniwar Jagadevappa Andanappa	983	1.18%	New
Margin of victory		2,427	2.92%	▼11.54
Turnout		83,100	61.73%	▼5.37
Total valid votes		82,988		
Registered electors		134,608		▲12.47
INC hold		Swing	▼20.84	

=== Assembly Election 1999 ===
1999 Karnataka Legislative Assembly election : Muddebihal
Party	Candidate	Votes	%	±%
INC	C. S. Nadagouda	43,662	57.23%	▲26.61
JD(U)	Vimalabai Deshmukh	32,632	42.77%	New
Margin of victory		11,030	14.46%	▼10.02
Turnout		80,306	67.10%	▲2.88
Total valid votes		76,294		
Rejected ballots		3,942	4.91%	▲2.25
Registered electors		119,682		▲5.13
INC gain from JD		Swing	▲2.13	

=== Assembly Election 1994 ===
1994 Karnataka Legislative Assembly election : Muddebihal
Party	Candidate	Votes	%	±%
JD	Vimalabai Deshmukh	39,149	55.10%	▲9.15
INC	C. S. Nadagouda	21,756	30.62%	▼18.55
INC	Halannawar Mallappa Hanamappa	6,189	8.71%	New
BJP	Hiremath Rajashekhar Siddabasayya	1,954	2.75%	▲1.48
Independent	K. M. Risaldar	643	0.91%	New
Kranti Sabha	Ninganagouda Shivamanappa Desai	452	0.64%	▼0.94
Margin of victory		17,393	24.48%	▲21.26
Turnout		73,110	64.22%	▼4.30
Total valid votes		71,049		
Rejected ballots		1,943	2.66%	▼1.29
Registered electors		113,838		▲15.37
JD gain from INC		Swing	▲5.93	

=== Assembly Election 1989 ===
1989 Karnataka Legislative Assembly election : Muddebihal
Party	Candidate	Votes	%	±%
INC	C. S. Nadagouda	31,933	49.17%	▲17.76
JD	Deshamukh Jagadevrao Sangana Basappa	29,840	45.95%	New
JP	Badarbandi Pavadeppa Shanmukhappa	1,321	2.03%	New
Kranti Sabha	Biradar Madivalappa Gouda Shankara Gouda	1,027	1.58%	New
BJP	Sajjan Ishwarappa Marasangappa	823	1.27%	New
Margin of victory		2,093	3.22%	▼33.96
Turnout		67,612	68.52%	▲1.72
Total valid votes		64,944		
Rejected ballots		2,668	3.95%	▲1.81
Registered electors		98,671		▲26.22
INC gain from JP		Swing	▼19.42	

=== Assembly Election 1985 ===
1985 Karnataka Legislative Assembly election : Muddebihal
Party	Candidate	Votes	%	±%
JP	Jagadevarao Deshmukh	35,056	68.59%	▲21.85
INC	Jaggal Basavarao Gayanappa	16,052	31.41%	New
Margin of victory		19,004	37.18%	▲10.79
Turnout		52,224	66.80%	▼0.63
Total valid votes		51,108		
Rejected ballots		1,116	2.14%	▼0.82
Registered electors		78,174		▲9.26
JP hold		Swing	▲21.85	

=== Assembly Election 1983 ===
1983 Karnataka Legislative Assembly election : Muddebihal
Party	Candidate	Votes	%	±%
JP	Jagadevarao Deshmukh	21,885	46.74%	▼13.11
Independent	Bhagawant Ramarao Sheshabhatta	9,530	20.35%	New
BJP	Pujari Siddayya Sidramayya	7,642	16.32%	New
Independent	Mallappa Murigeppasajjan	6,339	13.54%	New
Independent	Madar Kashappa Durgappa	668	1.43%	New
Independent	Jadhav Ramachandra Krishna	415	0.89%	New
Margin of victory		12,355	26.39%	▼9.64
Turnout		48,249	67.43%	▼6.71
Total valid votes		46,819		
Rejected ballots		1,430	2.96%	▼0.21
Registered electors		71,549		▲6.53
JP hold		Swing	▼13.11	

=== Assembly Election 1978 ===
1978 Karnataka Legislative Assembly election : Muddebihal
Party	Candidate	Votes	%	±%
JP	Jagadevarao Deshmukh	28,857	59.85%	New
INC(I)	Mallappa Murigeppasajjan	11,486	23.82%	New
Independent	Kazi Syed Sirajuddin Abdul Rauf	3,530	7.32%	New
INC	Makandar Bawasa Nabisa	2,118	4.39%	▼35.93
Independent	Masalin Sreesailappa Channappa	1,548	3.21%	New
Independent	Chiniwar Sangamesh Andaneppa	676	1.40%	New
Margin of victory		17,371	36.03%	▲34.31
Turnout		49,795	74.14%	▲9.93
Total valid votes		48,215		
Rejected ballots		1,580	3.17%	▲3.17
Registered electors		67,163		▼6.05
JP gain from INC		Swing	▲19.53	

=== Assembly Election 1972 ===
1972 Mysore State Legislative Assembly election : Muddebihal
Party	Candidate	Votes	%	±%
INC	S. M. Murigeppa	17,778	40.32%	▼15.58
INC(O)	G. S. Mallappa	17,021	38.60%	New
ABJS	N. M. Angappa	8,415	19.08%	New
Independent	M. K. Rudraswamy	882	2.00%	New
Margin of victory		757	1.72%	▼11.82
Turnout		45,900	64.21%	▲3.72
Total valid votes		44,096		
Registered electors		71,489		▲16.34
INC hold		Swing	▼15.58	

=== Assembly Election 1967 ===
1967 Mysore State Legislative Assembly election : Muddebihal
Party	Candidate	Votes	%	±%
INC	G. S. Mallappa	19,452	55.90%	▼0.77
SWA	M. S. Channappa	14,740	42.36%	▼0.97
Independent	M. B. Hanifsab	603	1.73%	New
Margin of victory		4,712	13.54%	▲0.20
Turnout		37,167	60.49%	▲5.57
Total valid votes		34,795		
Registered electors		61,448		▲29.36
INC hold		Swing	▼0.77	

=== Assembly Election 1962 ===
1962 Mysore State Legislative Assembly election : Muddebihal
Party	Candidate	Votes	%	±%
INC	Pranesh Sidhanti	13,969	56.67%	▲4.16
SWA	Shrishailappa Channappa Masali	10,680	43.33%	New
Margin of victory		3,289	13.34%	▲8.32
Turnout		26,089	54.92%	▼0.37
Total valid votes		24,649		
Registered electors		47,500		▲7.00
INC hold		Swing	▲4.16	

=== Assembly Election 1957 ===
1957 Mysore State Legislative Assembly election : Muddebihal
Party	Candidate	Votes	%	±%
INC	Pranesh Sidhanti	12,888	52.51%	▼12.65
Independent	Viraktamath Shivabasavaswami Gurumurugaswami	11,657	47.49%	New
Margin of victory		1,231	5.02%	▼29.79
Turnout		24,545	55.29%	▲6.64
Total valid votes		24,545		
Registered electors		44,393		▼15.37
INC hold		Swing	▼12.65	

=== Assembly Election 1952 ===
1952 Bombay State Legislative Assembly election : Muddebihal
Party	Candidate	Votes	%	±%
INC	Pranesh Sidhanti	16,627	65.16%	New
KMPP	Patil Bhimangouda Dodappa	7,745	30.35%	New
Independent	Holi Sangappa Mallappa	1,144	4.48%	New
Margin of victory		8,882	34.81%	
Turnout		25,516	48.65%	
Total valid votes		25,516		
Registered electors		52,453		
INC win (new seat)				

== See also ==
- List of constituencies of the Karnataka Legislative Assembly
