= M. C. Managuli =

Indian politician (died 2021)

Mallappa Channaveerappa Managuli

Minister of Horticulture, Government of Karnataka
- In office 6 June 2018 – 8 July 2019

Member of the Karnataka Legislative Assembly
- In office 14 May 2018 – 28 January 2021
- Preceded by: Ramesh Balappa Bhusanur
- Succeeded by: Ramesh Balappa Bhusanur
- Constituency: Sindagi
- In office 1994–1999
- Preceded by: Rayagondappa Bheemanna Choudhari
- Succeeded by: Sharanappa Tippanna Sunagar
- Constituency: Sindagi

Personal details
- Died: 28 January 2021
- Political party: Janata Dal (Secular)
- Children: Ashok M. Managuli, Dr. Shantveer, M. Managuli

Mallappa Channaveerappa Managuli (died 28 January 2021) was an Indian politician. he served as a member of the Karnataka Legislative Assembly, representing the seat of Sindagi for the Janata Dal (Secular).

M.C. Managuli served as Horticulture minister in the JDS-Congress coalition government.

== Death ==
Channaveerappa died of respiratory complications from COVID-19 in 2021 at the age of 85.
