= Babaleshwar Assembly constituency =

Legislative Assembly constituency in Karnataka state, India

Coordinates: 16.67°N 75.57°E

Babaleshwar
- Constituency No. 29 for the Karnataka Legislative Assembly

Constituency details
- Country: India
- Region: South India
- State: Karnataka
- District: Bijapur
- Lok Sabha constituency: Bijapur
- Established: 2008
- Total electors: 217,491
- Reservation: None

Member of Legislative Assembly
- 16th Karnataka Legislative Assembly
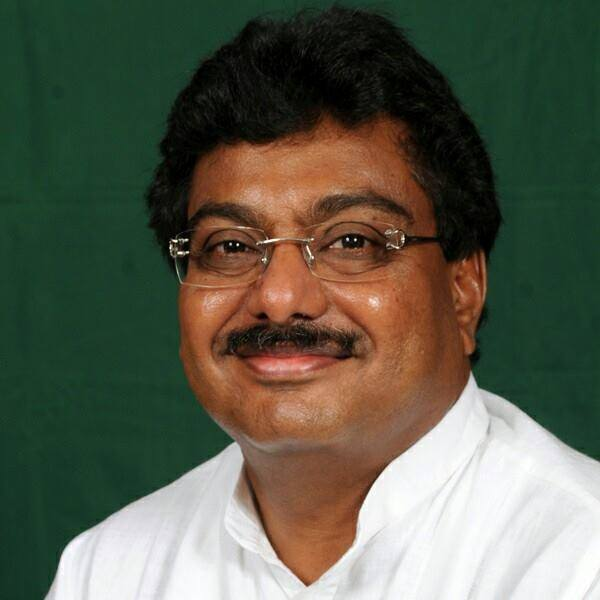
- Incumbent M. B. Patil
- Party: Indian National Congress
- Elected year: 2023

Babaleshwar Assembly constituency is one of the 224 Legislative Assembly constituencies of Karnataka in India. It is in Bijapur district. As of 2023, its representative is M. B. Patil of the Indian National Congress party.

== Members of the Legislative Assembly ==
Election	Member	Party
2008	M. B. Patil	Indian National Congress
2013	M. B. Patil	Indian National Congress
2018	M. B. Patil	Indian National Congress
2023	M. B. Patil	Indian National Congress

== Election results ==
=== Assembly Election 2023 ===
2023 Karnataka Legislative Assembly election : Babaleshwar
Party	Candidate	Votes	%	±%
INC	M. B. Patil	93,923	52.42%	▼4.87
BJP	Vijayakumar Vijayagouda Patil	78,707	43.92%	▲3.94
JD(S)	Basavaraj Honawad	1,304	0.73%	New
NOTA	None of the above	611	0.34%	▼0.70
Margin of victory		15,216	8.49%	▼8.82
Turnout		179,488	82.53%	▲1.46
Total valid votes		179,186		
Registered electors		217,491		▲2.70
INC hold		Swing	▼4.87	

=== Assembly Election 2018 ===
2018 Karnataka Legislative Assembly election : Babaleshwar
Party	Candidate	Votes	%	±%
INC	M. B. Patil	98,339	57.29%	▲11.10
BJP	Vijayakumar Sidramgouda Patil	68,624	39.98%	▲36.95
NOTA	None of the above	1,786	1.04%	New
Margin of victory		29,715	17.31%	▲14.07
Turnout		171,688	81.07%	▲8.04
Total valid votes		171,645		
Registered electors		211,779		▲15.04
INC hold		Swing	▲11.10	

=== Assembly Election 2013 ===
2013 Karnataka Legislative Assembly election : Babaleshwar
Party	Candidate	Votes	%	±%
INC	M. B. Patil	62,061	46.19%	▼4.71
JD(S)	Patil Vijugouda	57,706	42.95%	▲7.30
BJP	M. S. Rudragoudara	4,067	3.03%	▼4.57
KJP	Basappa. S. Honawad	2,646	1.97%	New
Independent	Shasappa Bhimaray Hanchanal	2,215	1.65%	New
BSP	Kamanna Ganganalli	1,042	0.78%	▼0.92
Independent	Sadashivappa Yamanappa Hadimani	924	0.69%	New
Margin of victory		4,355	3.24%	▼12.01
Turnout		134,447	73.03%	▲5.83
Total valid votes		134,348		
Registered electors		184,091		▲13.39
INC hold		Swing	▼4.71	

=== Assembly Election 2008 ===
2008 Karnataka Legislative Assembly election : Babaleshwar
Party	Candidate	Votes	%	±%
INC	M. B. Patil	55,525	50.90%	New
JD(S)	Vijugouda Patil	38,886	35.65%	New
BJP	Biradar Veeranagouda Nandabasappagouda	8,291	7.60%	New
Independent	Mallu Kashiram Nagaragoji	2,871	2.63%	New
BSP	Dr. Saraswati Chimmalagi	1,854	1.70%	New
Independent	G. S. Jalamatti	935	0.86%	New
SP	Malappa Shankar Hakke	725	0.66%	New
Margin of victory		16,639	15.25%	
Turnout		109,108	67.20%	
Total valid votes		109,087		
Registered electors		162,357		
INC win (new seat)				

== See also ==
- List of constituencies of the Karnataka Legislative Assembly
- Bijapur district, Karnataka
