= M. B. Patil =

Indian politician

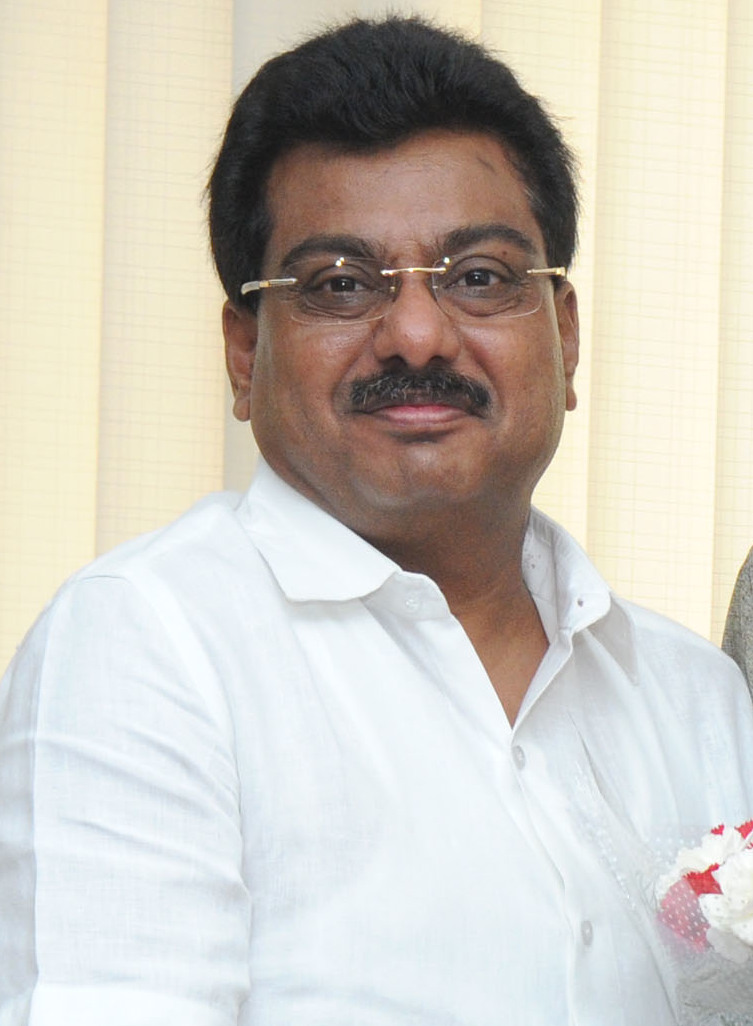
- M. B. Patil in 2015

Cabinet Minister Government of Karnataka
- Incumbent
- Assumed office 20 May 2023
- Governor: Thawarchand Gehlot
- Cabinet: Shivakumar ministry Second Siddaramaiah ministry
- Chief Minister: D. K. Shivakumar; Siddaramaiah
- Ministry and Departments: Large & Medium Industries; Infrastructure Development
- In office 28 December 2018 – 23 July 2019
- Governor: Vajubhai Vala
- Cabinet: Second Kumaraswamy ministry
- Chief Minister: H. D. Kumaraswamy
- Ministry and Departments: Home (excluding Intelligence)
- Preceded by: G. Parameshwara
- Succeeded by: Basavaraj Bommai
- In office 20 May 2013 – 17 May 2018
- Governor: Vajubhai Vala
- Cabinet: First Siddaramaiah ministry
- Chief Minister: Siddaramaiah
- Ministry and Departments: Water Resources
- Preceded by: Basavaraj Bommai
- Succeeded by: D. K. Shivakumar

Member of Karnataka Legislative Assembly
- Incumbent
- Assumed office 2008
- Constituency: Babaleshwar
- In office 2004–2008
- Constituency: Tikota
- In office 1991–1994
- Constituency: Tikota

Member of parliament, Lok Sabha
- In office 10 March 1998 – 3 October 1999
- Preceded by: Basanagouda Rudragouda Patil
- Succeeded by: Basangouda Patil Yatnal
- Constituency: Bijapur

Personal details
- Born: 7 October 1964 (age 61) Vijayapura, Mysore State, India
- Party: Indian National Congress
- Spouse: Asha Patil

Mallanagouda Basanagouda Patil (born 7 October 1964) is an Indian politician from Karnataka and a member of Karnataka Legislative Assembly representing Babaleshwar. He is currently serving as Cabinet Minister for Large & Medium Industries and Infrastructure Development in Government of Karnataka, He is also working president of Jagatika Lingayata Mahasabha.

== Early life and education ==
He is the elder son of Shri B.M.Patil, a politician and an educationist. He has completed graduation in Bachelor of Engineering, Civil Engineering at the BLDEA's Vachana Pitamaha P G Halakatti College of Engineering.

== Career ==
=== Social work ===
M.B. Patil has been involved in various social works including the distribution of school bags & books to the needy students, helping government schools in establishing smart classrooms, organizing plantation drives across Vijayapura district etc., through M B Patil foundation.

== Political career ==
He is the President of BLDE Association. He belongs to the Lingayat community.

Patil started his political career in 1991. He was allotted the Irrigation Ministry in Siddaramaiah’s cabinet in 2013. His work as the Irrigation Minister of Karnataka gave a new lease of life to various stalled irrigation projects across Karnataka. He is a former member of Lok Sabha and is being elected for the fifth time as a Member of the Karnataka Legislative Assembly.

Earlier, he was the Karnataka state Minister for Water Resources in the first Siddaramaiah cabinet.

He was allotted Home Ministry in December 2018 in H D Kumaraswamy’s cabinet. Having been seen as a clean-handed politician and also given that he hails from the politically-influential Lingayat community, he is considered to be a chief contender for being the position of Chief Minister of Karnataka in the future.
