= Atharga =

Atharga Athargan or Hatharki
- Village
- Location in Karnataka, India Atharga (India)
- Coordinates: 17.17°N 75.96°E
- Country: India
- State: Karnataka
- District: Bijapur
- Talukas: Indi

Population (2001)
  - Total: 8,610

Languages
  - Official: Kannada
- Time zone: UTC+5:30 (IST)
- PIN: 586112
- Telephone code: 08359
- Vehicle registration: KA28
- Nearest city: Indi Bijapur
- Sex ratio: 51:49 ♂/♀
- Literacy: >60%
- Lok Sabha constituency: Bijapur
- Vidhan Sabha constituency: Indi
- Climate: Semi-Arid to Arid (Köppen)

Atharga is a village in the southern state of Karnataka, India. It is located in the Indi taluk of Bijapur district in Karnataka.

== Demographics ==
As of 2001 India census, Atharga had a population of 8610 with 4430 males and 4180 females. The current MP of Bijapur lokasabha Mr. Ramesh Jigajinagi is from this village.

Sri Kulankareshwara Temple is in the west part of the village.

== Transport ==
Atharga is connected only by Road(SH34). There are many buses from Bijapur and Indi. The nearest railway station is Minchanal which is about 8 km from the village

Exactly 25 km from Bijapur and Indi.

== Education ==
1. BLDEA's Horticulture Training Institute
2. BLDEA's Shri R M Biradar High school and P U College
3. Banjara High School
4. Govt Kannada Boys Primary School
5. Govt Kannada Girls Primary School
6. Govt Urdu Primary School

There are many convent schools there, too.

== Economy ==
Farming and agriculture related business is the main occupation for many people in the village. The cropping pattern in the village reveals that food crops like jowar, maize, bajra and wheat among cereals, red gram, Bengal gram and green gram among pulses are major crops cultivated in the village. The major oilseed crops are sunflower, groundnut and safflower. Horticulture crops like grapes, pomegranate, ber, guava sapota, and lime are also grown. Atharga is famous for lime.

== See also ==
- Indi
- Bijapur
- Districts of Karnataka
