= A. S. Patil (Nadahalli) =

Indian politician (born 1969)

Personal details
- Born: 22 July 1969 (age 56) Muddebihal, Vijayapura, Karnataka
- Party: Bharatiya Janata Party
- Other political affiliations: Indian National Congress Janata Dal (Secular)
- Spouse: Mahadevi A Patil Nadahalli
- Children: 2
- Parent(s): Sanganagouda Patil (Father) & Smt. Gangubai (Mother)

Aminappagouda Sanganagouda Patil (born 22 July 1969), also known as A. S. Patil, is an Indian politician and member of the Bharatiya Janata Party. He has been elected three times to the Karnataka Legislative Assembly, and is an incumbent member of the Legislative Assembly (MLA) of the Muddebihal Assembly constituency.

== Early life ==
Patil was born in Nadahalli, a village in Muddebihal in the Vijayapura district. He is the third out of six children.

== Personal life ==
Patil is married to Mahadevi A. Patil Nadahalli. The couple has two sons.

== Political career ==
- 2008-2018: Won elections in the Devara Hipparagi Constituency.
- 2018-2023: Moved to win in Muddebihal Constituency, becoming associated with the Bharatiya Janata Party.
