= Ramesh Jigajinagi =

Indian politician (born 1952)

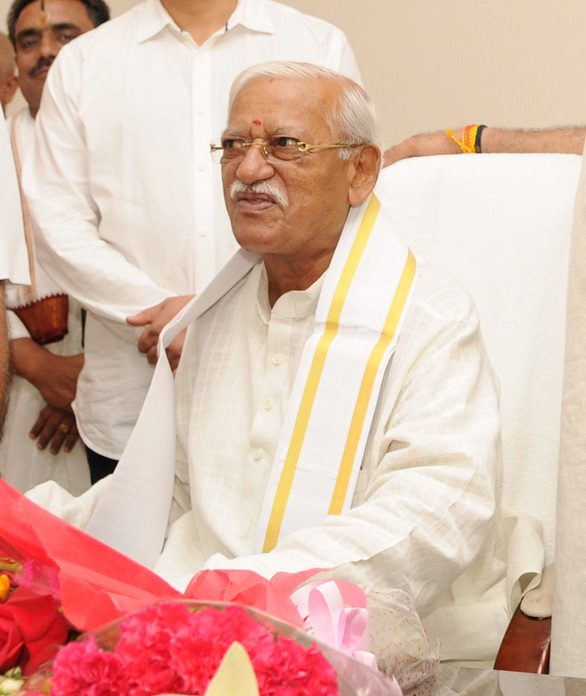

3rd Union Minister of State for Drinking Water & Sanitation
- In office 5 July 2016 – 30 May 2019
- Prime Minister: Narendra Modi
- Minister: Narendra Singh Tomar; Uma Bharti
- Preceded by: Birender Singh
- Succeeded by: Jal Shakti

Member of Parliament, Lok Sabha
- Incumbent
- Assumed office 2009
- Preceded by: Basangouda Patil Yatnal
- Constituency: Bijapur, Karnataka
- In office 1998–2009
- Preceded by: Ratnamala Dhareshwar Savanoor
- Succeeded by: Katti Ramesh Vishwanath
- Constituency: Chikkodi, Karnataka

Minister for Revenue Government of Karnataka
- In office 1996–1998

Minister for Social Welfare Government of Karnataka
- In office 1996–1998

Minister for Excise Government of Karnataka
- In office 1984–1985

Minister for Home Government of Karnataka
- In office 1983–1985

Member of Karnataka Legislative Assembly
- In office 1994–1998
- Preceded by: Manohar Umakant Ainapur
- Succeeded by: HR Algur
- Constituency: Ballolli
- In office 1983–1989
- Preceded by: Siddharth Sangappa Arakeri
- Succeeded by: Manohar Umakant Ainapur
- Constituency: Ballolli

Personal details
- Born: 28 June 1952 (age 74) Atharga, Bombay State (now in Karnataka), India
- Party: Bharatiya Janata Party (2004–present); Janata Dal (United) (1999–2004); Lok Shakti (1998–1999); Janata Dal (1992–1998); Janata Party (1983–1992)
- Spouse: Shobha
- Children: 2 sons
- As of 23 September, 2006

Ramesh Chandappa Jigajinagi (born 28 June 1952) is an Indian politician from Karnataka and currently a member of Lok Sabha. He was Union Minister of State for Drinking Water and Sanitation in 2016. He was member of the 12th , 13th, 14th, 15th and 16th Lok Sabha. He was inducted into Narendra Modi's government as a Minister of State for Drinking Water & Sanitation on July 5, 2016. He represents the Bijapur constituency (2019–2024) and is currently a member of the Bharatiya Janata Party which he joined in 2002. He has also been a member of Janata Dal and Ramakrishna Hegde's Vedike Party and Ram Vilas Paswan's Jan Shakti Party in 2001 when Hegde was planning to retire.

== Early life and education ==
Ramesh Jigajinagi was born on 28 June 1952 in Atharga village of Bijapur District in Karnataka to Chandappa and Bhoramma Jigajinagi. He married Shoba and has two sons, Vinod and Anand, both businessmen. He completed his B.A from BLDEA's New Arts College, Bijapur and later earned his master's degree. Ramesh is a Dalit and hails from a Scheduled Caste community.

== Career ==
He has been able to retain support in northern Karnataka, even after switching parties. His electoral victory is significant, contesting and winning his seat against B. Shankaranand of the Indian National Congress'. Ramesh entered the 12th Lok Sabha with a margin of 1,31,238 votes.

Initially, he joined the undivided Janata Dal under the mentorship of Ramakrishna Hegde. He remained in the Janata Dal and was a staunch supporter of Ramakrishna Hegde. When Ramakrishna Hegde floated the Rashtreeya Nava Nirmana Vedike, he was among the earliest sitting MLAs to support him and join the new party by resigning his ministership. Later, he joined Lok Shakti, a party formed by Ramakrishna Hegde and rejoined Janata Dal (United) after the merger of Lok Shakti with the former. After the death of his mentor, he joined the Bharatiya Janata Party. He was elected as MP for five times without a break.

He was elected as an MP for the first time in 1996 from Chikkodi, a constituency reserved from SC community, on Lok Shakti ticket. In 1998, he won again on Janata Dal ticket and on BJP ticket in 2004, both from Chikkodi. Later, he returned to Bijapur, his native after Chikkodi became an unreserved seat. From then on he won the Bijapur SC seat, which is now Vijayapura.

== Positions held ==
- Member of Karnataka Legislative Assembly 1983- 1985, 1985–1989, 1994-1999 (3 terms)
- Minister of State, Home Department in the Government of Karnataka 1983
- Minister of State, Excise Department in the Government of Karnataka 1984–1985
- Cabinet Minister for Social Welfare and Revenue in the Government of Karnataka 1996–1998
- Member of the 12th Loksabha 1998-1999 (Winning Margin=131238). From Chikkodi on Lok Shakti ticket.
- Member of the 13th Lok Sabha 1999-2004 (Winning Margin=84590)
- Member of the 14th Lok Sabha 2004-2009 (Winning Margin=43492), for BJP.
- Member of the 15th Lok Sabha 2009-2014 (Winning Margin=42404) From Bijapur.
- Member of the 16th Lok Sabha 2014- 2019 (Winning Margin=69819)
- Member of the 17th Lok Sabha 2019 - 2024 (Winning Margin = 2,58,038)
- Member of the 18th Lok Sabha 2024 - (Winning Margin = 77229)
- He has served as the member in the following committees
- Parliamentary Consultative Committee, Ministry of Finance
- Parliamentary Committee on Absence of Members from the sittings of the House
- Parliamentary Committee on Commerce
- Parliamentary Committee on Home Affairs and its Sub-Committee on Personnel Policy of Central Para-Military Forces
- Union Minister of State for Drinking Water & Sanitation 2016

== Electoral History ==
=== Lok Sabha ===
Year	Constituency	Party	Votes	%	Opponent	Party	Votes	%	Result	Margin	%
2024	Bijapur	BJP	6,72,781	52.21	Raju Alagur	INC	5,95,552	46.22	Won	+77,229	+5.99
2019	Bijapur	BJP	6,35,867	57.16	Sunita Devanand	JD(S)	3,77,829	33.96	Won	+2,58,038	+23.20
2014	Bijapur	BJP	4,71,757	48.80	Prakash Rathod	INC	4,01,938	41.57	Won	+69,819	+7.23
2009	Bijapur	BJP	3,08,939	47.56	Prakash Rathod	INC	2,66,535	41.03	Won	+42,404	+6.53
2004	Chikkodi	BJP	3,79,580	45.30	S. B. Ghatage	INC	3,36,088	40.11	Won	+43,492	+5.19
1999	Chikkodi	JD(U)	3,92,450	52.79	S. Pradeepkumar	INC	3,07,860	41.41	Won	+84,590	+11.38
1998	Chikkodi	LS	3,59,760	52.99	B. Shankaranand	INC	2,28,522	33.66	Won	+1,31,238	+19.33

== See also ==
- Members of Fourteenth Lok Sabha
