= Sindagi Assembly constituency =

Constituency of the Karnataka legislative assembly in India

Coordinates: 16.92°N 76.23°E

Sindagi
- Constituency No. 33 for the Karnataka Legislative Assembly
- Map of Sindagi Vidhana Sabha constituency

Constituency details
- Country: India
- Region: South India
- State: Karnataka
- District: Vijayapura
- Lok Sabha constituency: Bijapur
- Established: 1951
- Total electors: 236,670
- Reservation: None

Member of Legislative Assembly
- 16th Karnataka Legislative Assembly
- Incumbent Ashok M. Managuli
- Party: Indian National Congress
- Elected year: 2023

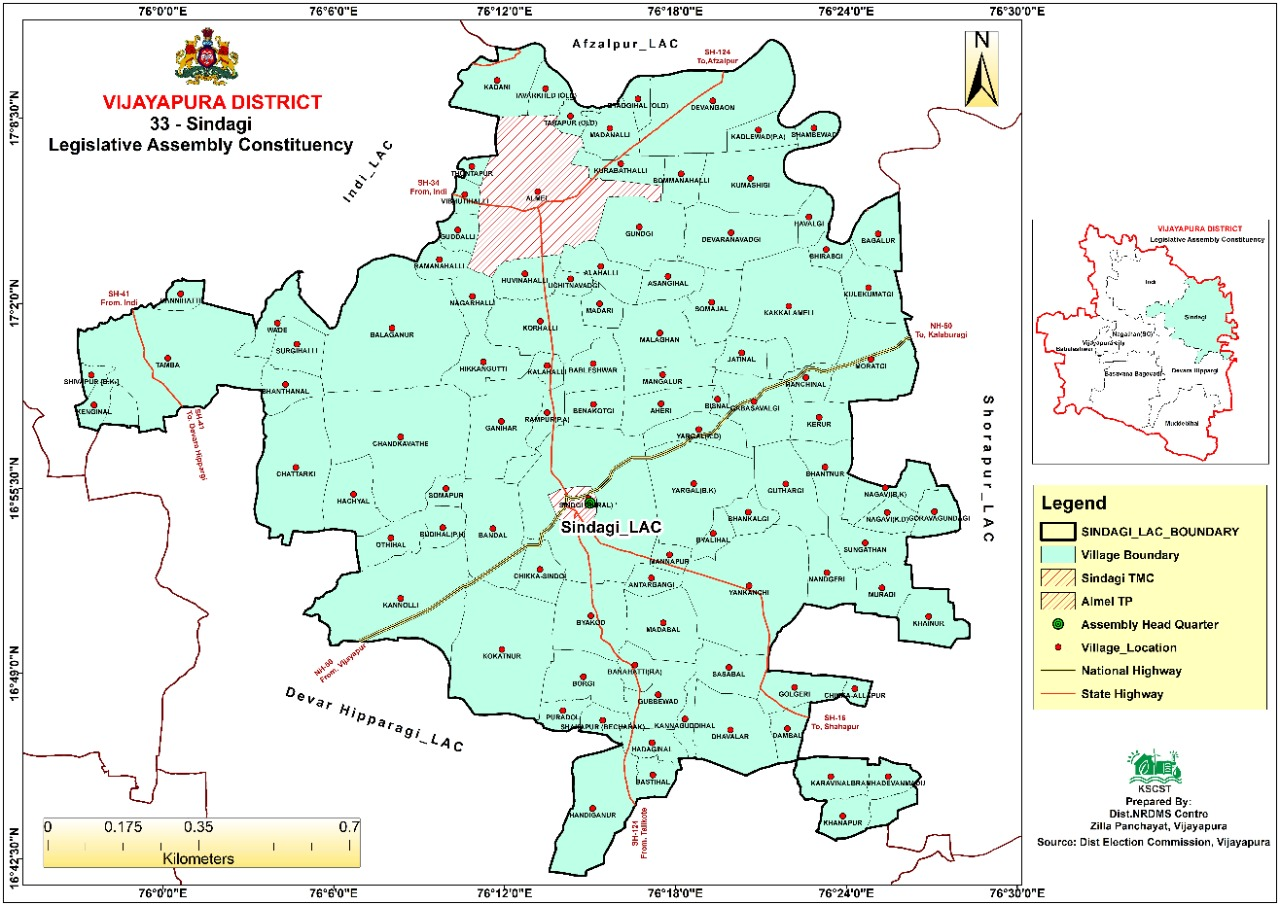

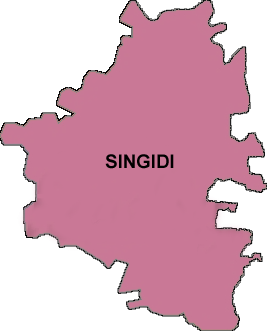

Sindagi Assembly constituency is one of 224 assembly constituencies in Karnataka in India. It is part of Bijapur Lok Sabha constituency.

== Members of the Legislative Assembly ==
Election	Member	Party
1957	Shankargouda Yashawantgouda Patil	Indian National Congress
1962	Channappa Madiwalappa Desai	Indian National Congress
1967	Channappa Madiwalappa Desai	Indian National Congress
1972	Shankargouda Yashawantgouda Patil	Indian National Congress
1978	Bekinalkar Maibubsaheb Hasansanheb	Indian National Congress
1983	Ninganagoud Rachana Goud Patil	Indian National Congress
1985	Biradar Mallanagouda Doulataraya	Janata Party
1989	Dr. Choudhari Rayagondappa Bhimanna	Indian National Congress
1994	M. C. Managuli	Janata Dal
1999	Sunagar Sharanappa Tippanna	Indian National Congress
2004	Ashok Gurappa Shabadi	Bharatiya Janata Party
2008	Bhusanur Ramesh Balappa	Bharatiya Janata Party
2013	Bhusanur Ramesh Balappa	Bharatiya Janata Party
2018	M. C. Managuli	Janata Dal
2021 By-election (Note: Died on 28/01/2021)	Bhusanur Ramesh Balappa	Bharatiya Janata Party
2023	Ashok M. Managuli	Indian National Congress

== Election results ==
=== Assembly Election 2023 ===
2023 Karnataka Legislative Assembly election : Sindagi
Party	Candidate	Votes	%	±%
INC	Ashok M. Managuli	87,621	50.53	▲12.02
BJP	Bhusanur Ramesh Balappa	79,813	46.03	▼11.64
JD(S)	Vishalakshi Shivanand Patil	2,283	1.32	▼1.35
NOTA	None of the above	963	0.56	▼0.07
Margin of victory		7,808	4.50	▼14.66
Turnout		174,119	73.57	▲4.15
Total valid votes		173,399		
Registered electors		236,670		▲0.89
INC gain from BJP		Swing	▼7.14	

=== Assembly By-election 2021 ===
2021 Karnataka Legislative Assembly by-election : Sindagi
Party	Candidate	Votes	%	±%
BJP	Bhusanur Ramesh Balappa	93,865	57.67	▲19.31
INC	Ashok M. Managuli	62,680	38.51	▲24.29
JD(S)	Angadi Naziya	4,353	2.67	▼41.48
NOTA	None of the above	1,031	0.63	▼0.13
Margin of victory		31,185	19.16	▲13.36
Turnout		162,852	69.42	▼1.98
Total valid votes		162,751		
Registered electors		234,584		▲4.28
BJP gain from JD(S)		Swing	▲13.52	

=== Assembly Election 2018 ===
2018 Karnataka Legislative Assembly election : Sindagi
Party	Candidate	Votes	%	±%
JD(S)	M. C. Managuli	70,865	44.15	▲15.32
BJP	Bhusanur Ramesh Balappa	61,560	38.36	▲8.94
INC	Sali Mallanna Ningappa	22,818	14.22	▼7.24
NOTA	None of the above	1,222	0.76	New
Margin of victory		9,305	5.80	▲5.22
Turnout		160,619	71.40	▲1.93
Total valid votes		160,496		
Registered electors		224,963		▲21.66
JD(S) gain from BJP		Swing	▲14.73	

=== Assembly Election 2013 ===
2013 Karnataka Legislative Assembly election : Sindagi
Party	Candidate	Votes	%	±%
BJP	Bhusanur Ramesh Balappa	37,834	29.42	▼4.51
JD(S)	Managuli Mallappa Channaveerappa	37,082	28.83	▲9.12
INC	Sunagar Sharanappa Tippanna	27,595	21.46	▲2.10
KJP	Patil Gurannagouda Goudappagouda	10,523	8.18	New
Independent	Rafiq Kane	6,938	5.39	New
Independent	Siddaramappa Rudrappa Ranjunagi	1,540	1.20	New
Independent	Mahantesh Bhimanna Naikodi	1,308	1.02	New
JD(U)	Devappagoud Guralingappagoud Patil (Chandakavate)	1,199	0.93	New
BSP	Dr. Dastagir	1,115	0.87	▼6.41
Margin of victory		752	0.58	▼13.64
Turnout		128,464	69.47	▲6.96
Total valid votes		128,606		
Registered electors		184,918		▲11.31
BJP hold		Swing	▼4.51	

=== Assembly Election 2008 ===
2008 Karnataka Legislative Assembly election : Sindagi
Party	Candidate	Votes	%	±%
BJP	Bhusanur Ramesh Balappa	35,227	33.93	▼5.35
JD(S)	Managuli Mallappa Channaveerappa	20,466	19.71	▼10.42
INC	Sunagar Sharanappa Tippanna	20,099	19.36	▼6.27
Independent	Patil Siddarama Shivamurteppa	9,721	9.36	New
BSP	S. M. Patil (Ganihar)	7,556	7.28	▲4.45
SP	Hiremath. N. S	6,976	6.72	New
Independent	Basavaraj Ravutappa Mulasavalagi	2,641	2.54	New
Independent	R. B. Choudhari	1,141	1.10	New
Margin of victory		14,761	14.22	▲5.07
Turnout		103,843	62.51	▲5.72
Total valid votes		103,827		
Registered electors		166,124		▼4.73
BJP hold		Swing	▼5.35	

=== Assembly Election 2004 ===
2004 Karnataka Legislative Assembly election : Sindagi
Party	Candidate	Votes	%	±%
BJP	Ashok Gurappa Shabadi	38,853	39.28	New
JD(S)	Managuli Mallappa Channaveerappa	29,803	30.13	▲22.94
INC	Sunagar Sharanappa Tippanna	25,352	25.63	▼7.69
BSP	Talwar Basavaraj Jummanna	2,795	2.83	▲1.82
Kannada Nadu Party	Prakash Lingappa Hirekurubar	2,108	2.13	New
Margin of victory		9,050	9.15	▼2.63
Turnout		99,029	56.79	▼5.17
Total valid votes		98,911		
Registered electors		174,363		▲11.39
BJP gain from INC		Swing	▲5.96	

=== Assembly Election 1999 ===
1999 Karnataka Legislative Assembly election : Sindagi
Party	Candidate	Votes	%	±%
INC	Sunagar Sharanappa Tippanna	30,432	33.32	▲10.81
Independent	Managuli Mallappa Channaveerappa	19,675	21.54	New
Independent	Guttedar Raju Basayya	15,629	17.11	New
Independent	Ashok Gurappa Shabadi	13,921	15.24	New
JD(S)	Chayagol Subhas Siddappa	6,562	7.19	New
JD(U)	Patil Shankargouda Sanganagouda	4,184	4.58	New
BSP	Mulla Mohammadkasim Khadarsab	923	1.01	New
Margin of victory		10,757	11.78	▼25.28
Turnout		96,984	61.96	▲5.80
Total valid votes		91,326		
Rejected ballots		5,652	5.83	▲3.58
Registered electors		156,527		▲12.77
INC gain from JD		Swing	▼26.24	

=== Assembly Election 1994 ===
1994 Karnataka Legislative Assembly election : Sindagi
Party	Candidate	Votes	%	±%
JD	M. C. Managuli	45,356	59.56	▲34.70
INC	Dr. Choudhari Rayagondappa Bhimanna	17,137	22.51	▼18.51
BJP	Jogur Malakappa Mahadevappa	9,661	12.69	New
Independent	Dr. Kullolli Kanthi Rava Ramappa	3,181	4.18	New
INC	Dr. Hiregoudar. C. N	812	1.07	New
Margin of victory		28,219	37.06	▲25.18
Turnout		77,951	56.16	▼4.29
Total valid votes		76,147		
Rejected ballots		1,750	2.25	▼2.93
Registered electors		138,803		▲9.52
JD gain from INC		Swing	▲18.54	

=== Assembly Election 1989 ===
1989 Karnataka Legislative Assembly election : Sindagi
Party	Candidate	Votes	%	±%
INC	Dr. Choudhari Rayagondappa Bhimanna	29,798	41.02	▲6.67
JP	Managuli Mallappa Channaveerappa	21,169	29.14	New
JD	Patil Gurulingappagoud Malakanagoud	18,061	24.86	New
Kranti Sabha	Patil Mallanagoud Bangareppagoud	2,258	3.11	New
Independent	Bagali Bhagappa Shivappa	887	1.22	New
Independent	Shivapadama Yamanappa Nayakodi	474	0.65	New
Margin of victory		8,629	11.88	▼15.34
Turnout		76,615	60.45	▲6.69
Total valid votes		72,647		
Rejected ballots		3,968	5.18	▲3.10
Registered electors		126,733		▲30.47
INC gain from JP		Swing	▼20.56	

=== Assembly Election 1985 ===
1985 Karnataka Legislative Assembly election : Sindagi
Party	Candidate	Votes	%	±%
JP	Biradar Mallanagouda Doulataraya	31,483	61.58	▲23.62
INC	Agasar Tippanna Mallappa	17,564	34.35	▼17.73
Independent	Dafedar Dastagirsab	772	1.51	New
BJP	Math Malakajayya Shenkrayya	600	1.17	New
Independent	Patil Goudappa Kashiraya	521	1.02	New
Margin of victory		13,919	27.22	▲13.10
Turnout		52,216	53.76	▼0.39
Total valid votes		51,129		
Rejected ballots		1,087	2.08	▼1.16
Registered electors		97,133		▲2.81
JP gain from INC		Swing	▲9.50	

=== Assembly Election 1983 ===
1983 Karnataka Legislative Assembly election : Sindagi
Party	Candidate	Votes	%	±%
INC	Ninganagoud Rachana Goud Patil	25,778	52.08	▲40.20
JP	Biradar Mallanagouda Doulataraya	18,788	37.96	▼2.21
Independent	Angadi Oshakha Bandagisab	2,451	4.95	New
Independent	Patil Sharanappa Gouda Channappagouda	1,200	2.42	New
Independent	Bekinalkar Maiboobsab Hasansab	751	1.52	New
Margin of victory		6,990	14.12	▲11.21
Turnout		51,158	54.15	▼1.37
Total valid votes		49,498		
Rejected ballots		1,660	3.24	▼0.69
Registered electors		94,474		▲10.78
INC gain from INC(I)		Swing	▲9.00	

=== Assembly Election 1978 ===
1978 Karnataka Legislative Assembly election : Sindagi
Party	Candidate	Votes	%	±%
INC(I)	Bekinalkar Maibubsaheb Hasansanheb	19,592	43.08	New
JP	Patill Shankargouda Yeshvantgaouda	18,268	40.17	New
INC	Patill Shankargouda Channappagouda	5,405	11.88	▼36.68
Independent	Patil Sharangluda Rachanagouda	723	1.59	New
Independent	Devernavadgi Kalappa Malkappa	481	1.06	New
Independent	Patil Ramilngappa Annarao	471	1.04	New
Independent	Biradar Basangouda Ningangouda	381	0.84	New
Margin of victory		1,324	2.91	▲0.04
Turnout		47,345	55.52	▲3.23
Total valid votes		45,482		
Rejected ballots		1,863	3.93	▲3.93
Registered electors		85,283		▲25.62
INC(I) gain from INC(O)		Swing	▼8.36	

=== Assembly Election 1972 ===
1972 Mysore State Legislative Assembly election : Sindagi
Party	Candidate	Votes	%	±%
INC(O)	S. Y. Patil	17,516	51.44	New
INC	M. H. Bekinalkar	16,538	48.56	▼7.06
Margin of victory		978	2.87	▼8.38
Turnout		35,500	52.29	▼0.65
Total valid votes		34,054		
Registered electors		67,892		▲11.91
INC(O) gain from INC		Swing	▼4.18	

=== Assembly Election 1967 ===
1967 Mysore State Legislative Assembly election : Sindagi
Party	Candidate	Votes	%	±%
INC	Channappa Madiwalappa Desai	16,668	55.62	▼1.80
Independent	S. Y. Patil	13,298	44.38	New
Margin of victory		3,370	11.25	▼15.72
Turnout		32,118	52.94	▲0.83
Total valid votes		29,966		
Registered electors		60,664		▲21.48
INC hold		Swing	▼1.80	

=== Assembly Election 1962 ===
1962 Mysore State Legislative Assembly election : Sindagi
Party	Candidate	Votes	%	±%
INC	Channappa Madiwalappa Desai	14,012	57.42	▲8.81
SWA	Shidappa Nijalingappa Raddewadgi	7,432	30.46	New
Independent	Shankargouda Yashawantgouda Patil	2,146	8.79	New
Independent	Bindumadhavarao Govindrao Deshapande	599	2.45	New
ABJS	Madhavaao Vithalrao Kulkarni	213	0.87	New
Margin of victory		6,580	26.97	▲15.43
Turnout		26,023	52.11	▲8.26
Total valid votes		24,402		
Registered electors		49,936		▲4.87
INC hold		Swing	▲8.81	

=== Assembly Election 1957 ===
1957 Mysore State Legislative Assembly election : Sindagi
Party	Candidate	Votes	%	±%
INC	Shankargouda Yashawantgouda Patil	10,149	48.61	New
Independent	Konnur Gavadappa Shivarayappa	7,739	37.07	New
Independent	Kulkarni Madhav Vithal	2,991	14.33	New
Margin of victory		2,410	11.54	
Turnout		20,879	43.85	
Total valid votes		20,879		
Registered electors		47,619		
INC win (new seat)				

== See also ==
- List of constituencies of Karnataka Legislative Assembly
