= Makbul S Bagawan =

Indian politician

Member of Legislative Assembly, Karnataka
- In office 2013-2018
- Preceded by: Appu Pattanshetty
- Succeeded by: Basangouda Patil Yatnal
- Constituency: Bijapur City

Personal details
- Born: 20 March 1969 (age 57) Vijayapura
- Party: Indian National Congress

Makbul Shabbir Bagawan is an Indian politician and former member of the legislative assembly of the state of Karnataka.

== Political career ==
He is a member of the Indian National Congress. He was elected from the Bijapur constituency of the Karnataka Legislative Assembly in 2013.
