= Basangouda Patil Yatnal =

Indian politician (born 1963)

Member of Karnataka Legislative Assembly
- Incumbent
- Assumed office 15 May 2018
- Preceded by: Makbul S Bagawan
- Constituency: Bijapur City
- In office 1994 - 1999
- Preceded by: Ustad patel
- Succeeded by: Ustad Mehboob Patel
- Constituency: Bijapur

Member of Karnataka Legislative Council
- In office 6 January 2016 – 15 May 2018
- Succeeded by: Sunil Gouda B. Patil
- Constituency: Bijapur Local Authorities

Member of Parliament, Lok Sabha
- In office 1999–2009
- Preceded by: M. B. Patil
- Succeeded by: Ramesh Chandappa Jigajinagi
- Constituency: Bijapur

Minister of State Government of India
- In office 1 July 2002 - 22 May 2004
- Ministry: Term
- Minister of Railways: 8 September 2003 - 22 May 2004
- Minister of Textiles: 1 July 2002 - 8 September 2003

Personal details
- Born: 13 December 1963 (age 62) Bijapur, Karnataka
- Party: Bharatiya Janata Party (1994-2010,2013-2015;2018-2025)
- Other political affiliations: Janata Dal (Secular) (2010-2013)
- Spouse: Shailaja Basangouda Patil
- Children: 2 sons
- Parent(s): Ramanagouda B. Patil Yatnal and Kashibai R. Patil Yatnal

Basangouda Ramangouda Patil Yatnal (born 13 December 1963) is an Indian politician and Hindu leader, who was the Minister of state for Textiles from 1 July 2002 to 8 September 2003 and Minister of state for Railways from 8 September 2003 to 16 May 2004 and current MLA from Bijapur City Assembly constituency since 2018. He has been a member of parliament from the Bijapur constituency for two terms and has been a member of the legislative council from the Bijapur Local Authorities constituency for one term. Basangouda Patil Yatnal was expelled from BJP for six years for "Anti-Party" Remarks on 26 March 2025.

== Political career ==
Yatnal contested as a candidate of the Bharatiya Janata Party and was elected from the Bijapur constituency in the 1994 Karnataka Legislative Assembly election. In the 1999 Indian general election, he contested and was elected from the Bijapur constituency of the Lok Sabha. He was re-elected to the Lok Sabha in the 2004 Indian general election. He was denied candidacy to contest on behalf of the Bharatiya Janata Party in the 2009 Indian general election as Bijapur constituency became SC reserved after Delimitation.

In 2010, he joined the Janata Dal (Secular). In the 2013 Karnataka Legislative Assembly election, he contested as a candidate of the Janata Dal (Secular) but lost the election from the Bijapur constituency. He later rejoined the Bharatiya Janata Party after being denied the post of state president by the Janata Dal (Secular) in the same year.

In 2015, he was expelled from the Bharatiya Janata Party for 6 years for not withdrawing his nomination as an independent candidate for the twin constituencies of the Bijapur Local Authorities constituency of the Karnataka Legislative Council. He won the election alongside S. R. Patil of the Indian National Congress.

In 2018, he was re-inducted into the Bharatiya Janata Party after 3 years. The Deccan Chronicle noted that his adoption of a hardcore Hindu nationalist stance and support of the Panchamsali and Lingayat community aided him in being considered by the party president Amit Shah without understanding the local politics and BSY capability. He contested as a candidate of the Bharatiya Janata Party and won the election for a 2nd time from the Bijapur constituency in the 2018 Karnataka Legislative Assembly election.

In February 2020, Yatnal sparked a row by calling centenarian freedom fighter H. S. Doreswamy, a Pakistani agent.

On 9 November 2020, Yatnal had a jibe at Islamic and Christian festivals and practices and called for “noiseless Fridays, bloodless Bakrid and cracker-less New Year Eve”.

On 26 March 2025, Bharatiya Janata Party – Karnataka expelled Basanagouda Patil Yatnal for six years for his anti-party stands with factional activities against the state president.

== Positions held ==
- Member, Karnataka Legislative Assembly - 1994–1999.
- Member, 13th Loksabha - 1999.
- Member, Committee on Industry - 1999–2002
- Member, Parliament Committee on Industry.
- Member, Parliament Committee on Private Members' Bills and Resolutions - 1999–2002
- Member, Parliamentary Consultative Committee, Ministry of Human Resources Development - 2000–2002
- Union Minister of State, Ministry of Textiles: 1 July 2002 - 8 Sept. 2003
- Union Minister of State, Ministry of Railways: 8 Sept. 2003 - May 2004
- Member, 14th Loksabha - 2004. (Reelected)
- Member, Parliament Committee on Labour.
- Member, Parliament House Committee.
- Member, Parliament Committee on Members of Parliament Local Area Development Scheme.
- Member of legislative council ( 2015–2018)
- Member of legislative assembly (2018–Present)

== Hate Speech ==
- A purported video of Basanagouda Patil instructing corporators to work only for Hindus, who have voted for him, and not for Muslims, has gone viral on social media. He was heard saying- "I had called all corporators and have told them that they should work for Hindus and not Muslims...who have voted for me in Bijapur".
- BJP MLA Basanagouda Patil Yatnal on Feb. 2023 made a statement targeting Muslims in the state and comparing them with the late ruler of Mysore Tipu Sultan and urged not to cast votes for Muslims, even by mistake. He said -"All MLAs ask me that there are one lakh Tipu Sultans in your constituency (Muslim voters), so how did you, a Shivaji Maharaj descendant win from Bijapur? In the future, no followers of Tipu Sultan will win in Bijapur. Only descendants of Shivaji Maharaj will win. Yes or no? You mustn't vote for Muslims even by mistake."
