= Bijapur Lok Sabha constituency =

Constituency of the Indian parliament in Karnataka

Coordinates: 16.8°N 75.7°E

Bijapur
- Lok Sabha constituency
- Bijapur Lok Sabha Constituency Map

Constituency details
- Country: India
- Region: South India
- State: Karnataka
- District: Bijapur
- Assembly constituencies: Muddebihal; Devar Hippargi; Basavana Bagevadi; Babaleshwar; Bijapur City; Nagthan; Indi; Sindagi
- Established: 1952
- Reservation: SC

Member of Parliament
- 18th Lok Sabha
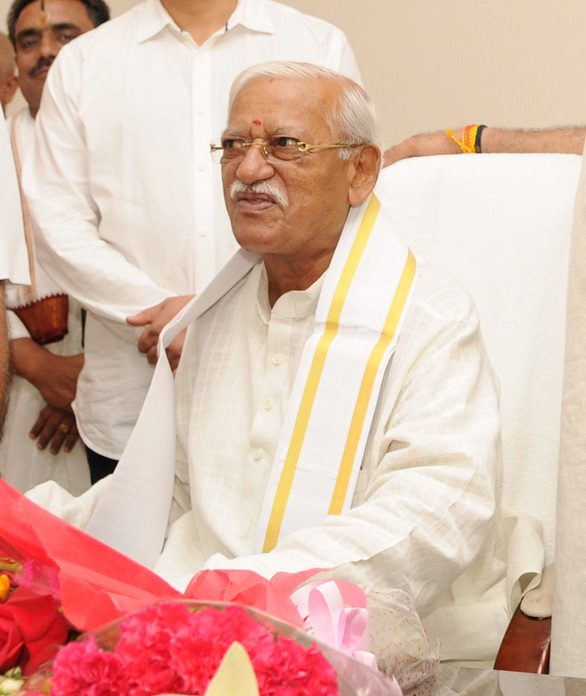
- Incumbent Ramesh Chandappa Jigajinagi
- Party: Bharatiya Janata Party
- Elected year: 2019

Bijapur (Vijayapura) Lok Sabha constituency is one of the 28 Lok Sabha (parliamentary) constituencies in Karnataka state in southern India. This constituency is reserved for the candidates belonging to the Scheduled castes.

== Assembly segments ==
Bijapur Lok Sabha constituency presently comprises the following eight Legislative Assembly segments:

No	Name	District	Member	Party	Party Leading (in 2024)
26	Muddebihal	Bijapur	C. S. Nadagouda	INC	BJP
27	Devar Hippargi	Bijapur	Rajugouda Patil	JD(S)	BJP
28	Basavana Bagevadi	Bijapur	Shivanand Patil	INC	BJP
29	Babaleshwar	Bijapur	M. B. Patil	INC	BJP
30	Bijapur City	Bijapur	Basangouda Patil Yatnal	BJP	INC
31	Nagthan (SC)	Bijapur	Vittal Katakadhond	INC	BJP
32	Indi	Bijapur	Yashavant Rayagoud Patil	INC	BJP
33	Sindagi	Bijapur	Ashok M. Managuli	INC	BJP

== Members of Parliament ==
Year	Name	Party
1952	Rajaram Girdharilal Dubey	Indian National Congress
1957	Murigappa Siddappa Sugandhi	Independent
1962	Rajaram Girdharilal Dubey	Indian National Congress
1967	G.D. Patil	Swatantra Party
1971	Bhimappa Choudhari	Indian National Congress
1977	Kalingappa Choudhari	Indian National Congress
1980	Kalingappa Choudhari	Indian National Congress (I)
1984	Shivashankarappa Guraddi	Janata Party
1989	Basagondappa Gudadinni	Indian National Congress
1991	Basagondappa Gudadinni	Indian National Congress
1996	Basanagouda Rudragouda Patil	Janata Dal
1998	M. B. Patil	Indian National Congress
1999	Basangouda Patil Yatnal	Bharatiya Janata Party
2004	Basangouda Patil Yatnal	Bharatiya Janata Party
2009	Ramesh Jigajinagi	Bharatiya Janata Party
2014	Ramesh Jigajinagi	Bharatiya Janata Party
2019	Ramesh Jigajinagi	Bharatiya Janata Party
2024	Ramesh Jigajinagi	Bharatiya Janata Party

== Election results ==
=== General Election 2024 ===
2024 Indian general election: Bijapur
Party	Candidate	Votes	%	±%
BJP	Ramesh Jigajinagi	672,781	51.91	▼5.31
INC	Raju Alagur	595,552	45.95	▲11.95
KRS	Ganapati Rathod (Hanjagi)	7,691	0.60	
NOTA	None of the above	7,502	0.58	▼0.53
Majority		77,229	5.96	▼17.26
Turnout		1,297,073	66.59	▲4.70
BJP hold		Swing	▼5.31	

=== 2019 ===
2019 Indian general elections: Bijapur
Party	Candidate	Votes	%	±%
BJP	Ramesh Chandappa Jigajinagi	635,867	57.22	+9.42
JD(S)	Sunita Chavan	377,829	34.00	+28.05
IND.	Dhareppa Mahadev Ardhavar	23,706	2.13	
BSP	Pujari Shrinath Sangapaa	23,442	2.11	
NOTA	None of the above	12,286	1.11	
Majority		258,038	23.22	+16.02
Turnout		1,112,493	61.89	
BJP hold		Swing		

=== General election 2014 ===
2014 Indian general elections: Bijapur
Party	Candidate	Votes	%	±%
BJP	Ramesh Chandappa Jigajinagi	471,757	48.80	
INC	Prakash Rathod	401,938	41.58	
JD(S)	K. Shivram	57,551	5.95	
NOTA	None of the above	8,287	0.86	
Majority		69,819	7.22	
Turnout		966,797	59.58	
BJP hold		Swing		

== See also ==
- Vijayapura district, Karnataka
- List of constituencies of the Lok Sabha
