= Syed Mohid Altaf =

Indian politician

Special Representative of the Government of Karnataka to the Union Government
- In office 5 September 2018 – August 2019
- Chief Minister: H. D. Kumaraswamy

Personal details
- Born: July 28, 1978 (age 47) Karnataka, India
- Party: Janata Dal (Secular)
- Occupation: Advocate, educationist, politician
- Known for: Founding NA Global Law School, role in JD(S) politics

Syed Mohid Altaf (born 28 July 1978) is an advocate by profession, educationist, politician from Karnataka and former Special representative of the Government of Karnataka to the Union Government.

== Political career ==
Syed Mohid Altaf was influenced by the secular ideology of former Prime Minister of India H. D. Deve Gowda, joined Janata Dal (Secular) in the year 2012. He contested General Assembly election 2013 at Sarvagnanagar Constituency He fought against K J George and was lost the elections. In the year 2013, Mr. Altaf was appointed as the State President of JDS Minority Wing. He was elevated in 2014 as State Youth Working President. In 2017, Mr. Altaf designed Karnataka Vikasa Vahini for Kumara Parva, a Luxury Carvana Election Campaign Bus for upcoming State Assembly Election. Built at a cost of 1 Crore, it became a talking point of JDS Campaign. In the year 2018 Karnataka Pradesh Janata Dal Secular and Congress Party pacted a post-poll alliance andformed the Government.

== As Special Rep of Karnataka Government at Delhi ==
On 5 September 2018, H. D. Kumaraswamy appointed him as the Special representative of the Government of Karnataka to the Union Government as Minister of State Ranking. His appointment did ruffle feathers within the coalition government. However, Mr. Kumaraswamy persisted with Mr. Altaf. In 2019, Mr. Altaf held active role in negotiations with Karnataka Pradesh Congress Committee to fight the 2019 Indian general election jointly.

Mr. Altaf actively engaged with Business Community to bring in FDI into Karnataka.

He resigned in August 2019, after H. D. Kumaraswamy government lost majority in Karnataka.

Subsequently, Mr. Altaf was designated as JDS Spokesperson and presents JDS views to the media.

== Educationist ==
Mr. Altaf runs NA Global Law School, A Law College named after his parents. It was established in 2015.

- Altaf’s appointment has upset Congress leaders
- Cong, JD(S) leaders upset as HDK appoints Dr. Syed Mohid Altaf Karnataka’s special representative
- ON THE OCCATION [sic] OF INDEPENDENCE DAY MOHID ALTAF AWARDED MERITORIOUS STUDENTS OF HEBBAL ASSEMBLY
