= Special representative of the Government of Karnataka to the Union Government =

Special representative of the Government of Karnataka to the Union Government is the post created by Government of Karnataka. It carries the privileges equivalent to Cabinet Minister in Government of Karnataka.

== Background ==
Southern States of India have felt they lack requisite support to co-ordinate with Government of India to get funds, support and fervour to their states. Hence, they have preferred to appoint a dedicated liaison person, seated at National Capital Delhi to ensure optimal benefit to their states.

Karnataka started this practice in 2007 by appointing V. Dhananjay Kumar. Later, post of Additional Special Representative was created in 2009, to assist in securing better support from Union Government.

== List of People ==
Special representative of the Government of Karnataka to the Union Government is a political appointee.

- V. Dhananjay Kumar
- C.S.Nadagouda
- Syed Mohid Altaf
- Shankargouda Patil

Additional Special representative of the Government of Karnataka to the Union Government

- Saleem Ahmed
