= Ashok M. Managuli =

Indian politician (born 1969)

Ashok Mallappa Managuli

Member of the Karnataka Legislative Assembly
- Incumbent
- Assumed office 2023
- Preceded by: Ramesh Balappa Bhusanur
- Constituency: Sindagi

Personal details
- Born: 1969 (age 56–57) Karnataka, India
- Party: Indian National Congress
- Parent: M. C. Managuli (father)

Ashok Mallappa Managuli (born 1969) is an Indian politician from Karnataka. He is serving as member of the Karnataka Legislative Assembly from the Sindagi Assembly constituency since 2023. He won over the symbol of the Indian National Congress.
