= Shivanand Patil =

Indian politician from Karnataka

Cabinet Minister, Government of Karnataka
- In office 27 May 2023 – 29 May 2026
- Governor: Thawarchand Gehlot
- Cabinet: Second Siddaramaiah ministry
- Chief Minister: Siddaramaiah
- Ministry and Departments: Textiles; Sugarcane Development & Directorate of Sugar; Agricultural Marketing
- In office 6 June 2018 – 23 July 2019
- Governor: Vajubhai Vala
- Cabinet: Second Kumaraswamy ministry
- Chief Minister: H. D. Kumaraswamy
- Ministry and Departments: Health & Family Welfare

Member of the Karnataka Legislative Assembly
- Incumbent
- Assumed office 2013
- Preceded by: S. K. Bellubbi
- Constituency: Basavana Bagevadi
- In office 2004–2008
- Preceded by: S. K. Bellubbi
- Succeeded by: S. K. Bellubbi
- Constituency: Basavana Bagevadi

Personal details
- Born: 23 April 1964 (age 62) Bijapur, Mysore State (now Karnataka), India
- Party: Indian National Congress
- Other political affiliations: Bharatiya Janata Party; Janata Dal
- Occupation: Politician

Shivanand Siddaramgouda Patil (born 23 April 1964) is an Indian politician from the state of Karnataka. He is currently serving as Cabinet Minister in Government of Karnataka & as a member of Karnataka Legislative Assembly representing Basavana Bagevadi.

He was also a minister in Second H. D. Kumaraswamy ministry.

Shivanand Patil has been appointed as chairman for Karnataka Urban Water Supply and Sewerage Board in 2016.

== Career ==
Patil represented Tikota in the Karnataka Legislative Assembly in the 1990s. He won with a Janata Dal ticket in the 1994 election and with a Bharatiya Janata Party (BJP) ticket in 1999. In March 2004, he quit the BJP expressing unhappiness with the party's "internal culture". Ahead of the legislative assembly election, the party had given away the Tikota seat to a Janata Dal (United) candidate, a party they were in coalition with, which Patil noted on being done without consulting him.

=== Controversy ===
In 2023, he sparked a controversy by commenting that the state government's compensation package of ₹5 lakh has been a contributing factor to the increasing number of farmer suicides. As per 2019 data, Karnataka recorded second highest number of farmers' suicide.

== See also ==
- Farmers' suicides in India
