= Appu Pattanshetty =

Indian politician

Minister of Textiles Government of Karnataka
- In office 25 January 2007 – 8 October 2007
- Chief Minister: H. D. Kumaraswamy
- Preceded by: B Sriramulu
- Succeeded by: Goolihatti Shekhar

Member of Karnataka Legislative Assembly
- In office 2004–2013
- Preceded by: Ustad Mehboob Patel
- Succeeded by: Makbul S Bagawan
- Constituency: Bijapur

Personal details
- Born: Ballolli
- Party: Bharatiya Janata Party
- Spouse: Smt Madhumati A Pattanshetty
- Children: 3
- Occupation: Politician

Appasaheb(Appu) Pattanshetty is an Indian politician and former member of the legislative assembly of the state of Karnataka. He is a member of the Bharatiya Janata Party. He was elected for two consecutive terms in 2004 and 2008 from the Bijapur constituency of the Karnataka Legislative Assembly.
