= C. S. Nadagouda =

Indian politician

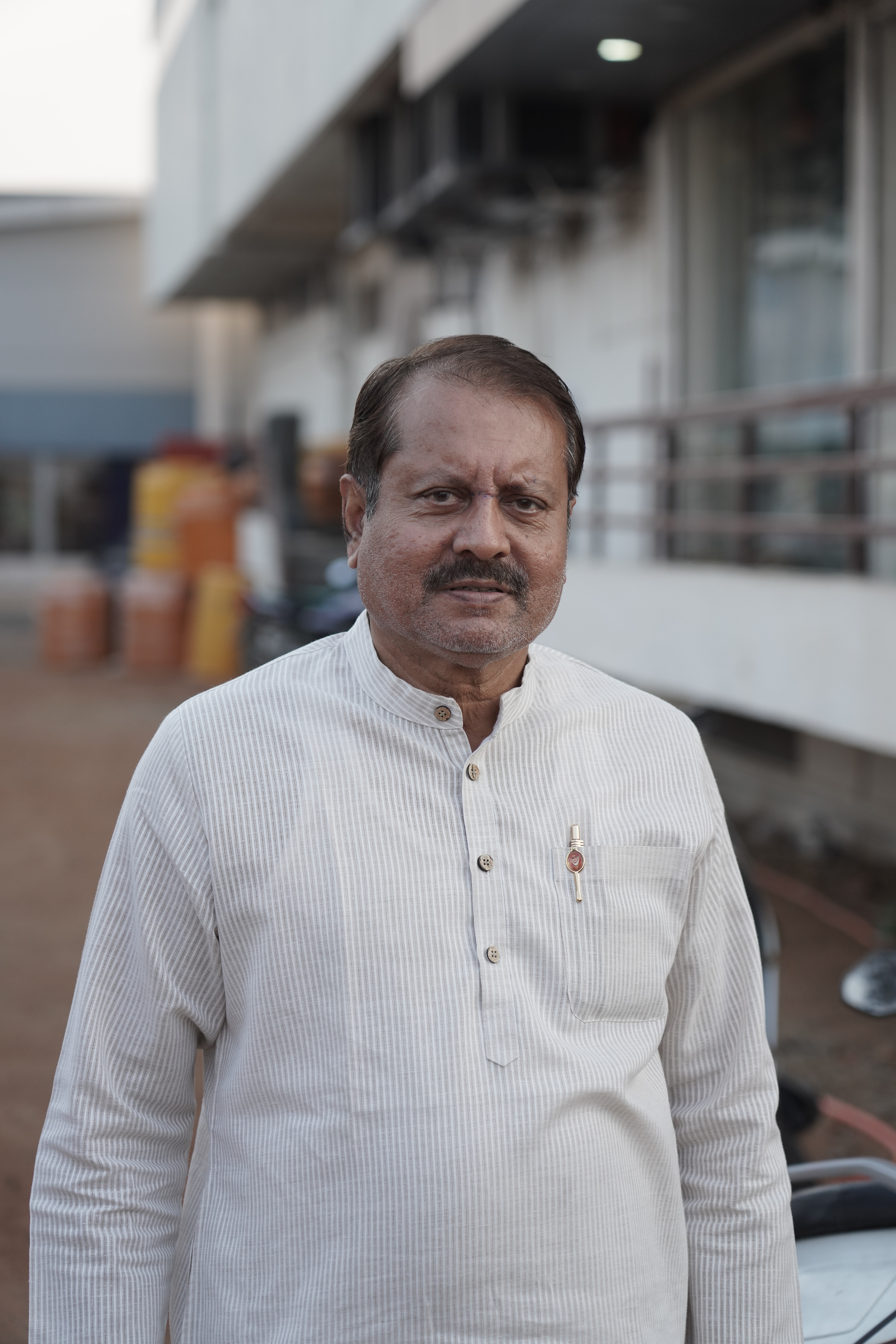
- Nadagouda in 2023

Member of the Karnataka Legislative Assembly
- Constituency: Muddebihal

Personal details
- Party: Indian National Congress

Appaji Channabasavaraja Shankararao Nadagouda, also referred to as C. S. Nadagouda is a Congress Politician from Karnataka and 6-Time MLA representing Muddebihal constituency. He served as Special Representative of Karnataka Government at Delhi between 2014 and 2018.

== Positions held ==
- 1989: Elected to Karnataka Legislative Assembly
- 1999: Elected to Karnataka Legislative Assembly
- 2004: Elected to Karnataka Legislative Assembly
- 2008: Elected to Karnataka Legislative Assembly
- 2013: Elected to Karnataka Legislative Assembly
- 2014 - 2018: Special Representative of Karnataka Government at Delhi
- 2023: Elected to Karnataka Legislative Assembly
- 26 January 2024 - Incumbent: Chairman, Karnataka Soaps and Detergents Limited (KSDL)
