= Mysore Lok Sabha constituency =

Constituency of the Indian parliament in Karnataka, India

Coordinates: 12.3°N 76.6°E

Mysore
- Lok Sabha constituency
- Mysuru Lok Sabha Constituency Map

Constituency details
- Country: India
- Region: South India
- State: Karnataka
- Assembly constituencies: Madikeri; Virajpet; Periyapatna; Hunasuru; Chamundeshwari; Krishnaraja; Chamaraja; Narasimharaja
- Established: 1952
- Reservation: None

Member of Parliament
- 18th Lok Sabha
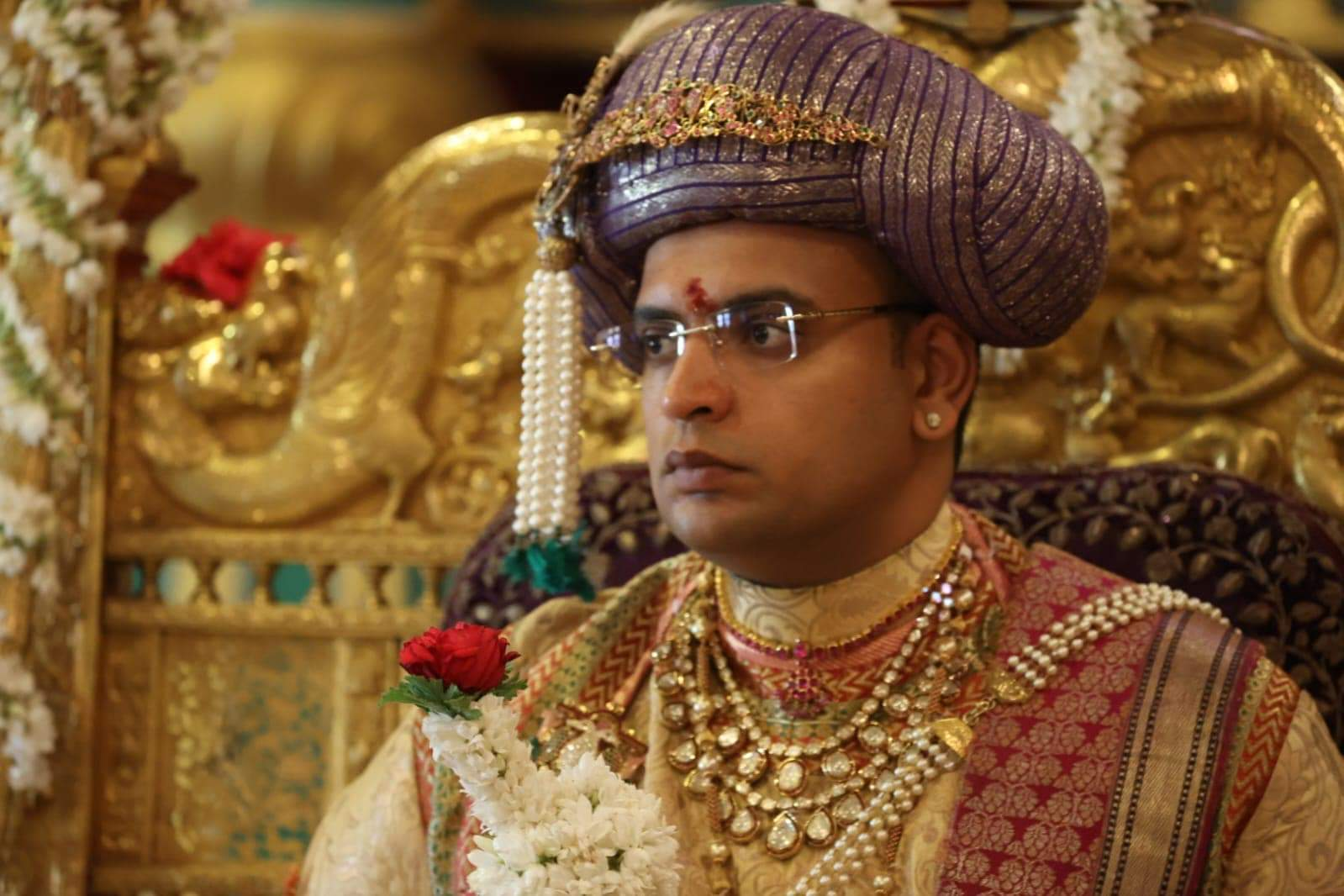
- Incumbent Yaduveer Krishnadatta Chamaraja Wadiyar
- Party: BJP
- Elected year: 2024
- Preceded by: Pratap Simha

Mysore Lok Sabha Constituency is one of the 28 Lok Sabha constituencies in Karnataka.

== Assembly segments ==
Presently, Mysore Lok Sabha constituency comprises the following eight legislative assembly segments:

No	Name	District	Member	Party	Party Leading (in 2024)
208	Madikeri	Kodagu	Dr. Mantar Gowda	INC	BJP
209	Virajpet	Kodagu	A. S. Ponnanna	INC	BJP
210	Periyapatna	Mysore	K. Venkatesh	INC	INC
212	Hunasuru	Mysore	G. D. Harish Gowda	JD(S)	BJP
215	Chamundeshwari	Mysore	G. T. Devegowda	JD(S)	BJP
216	Krishnaraja	Mysore	T. S. Srivatsa	BJP	BJP
217	Chamaraja	Mysore	K. Harish Gowda	INC	BJP
218	Narasimharaja	Mysore	Tanveer Sait	INC	INC

Madikeri and Virajpet Legislative Assembly segments were earlier in the erstwhile Dakshina Kannada (Mangalore) Lok Sabha constituency. They were later added up to Mysore Lok sabha Constituency during Delimitation process in 2007 by Delimitation Commission of India, which came into existence during 2009 Indian general election.

== Members of Parliament ==
Year	Member	Party
1952	M. S. Gurupadaswamy	Kisan Mazdoor Praja Party
1952	N. Rachaiah	Indian National Congress
1957	M. Shankaraiya	Indian National Congress
1957	S.M. Siddaiah	Indian National Congress
1962	M. Shankaraiya	Indian National Congress
1967	Tulasidas Dasappa	Indian National Congress
1971	Tulasidas Dasappa	Indian National Congress
1977	Tulasidas Dasappa	Indian National Congress
1980	M. Rajasekara Murthy	Indian National Congress (I)
1984	Srikantadatta Wadiyar	Indian National Congress
1989	Srikantadatta Wadiyar	Indian National Congress
1991	Chandraprabha Urs	Indian National Congress
1996	Srikantadatta Wadiyar	Indian National Congress
1998	C. H. Vijayashankar	Bharatiya Janata Party
1999	Srikantadatta Wadiyar	Indian National Congress
2004	C. H. Vijayashankar	Bharatiya Janata Party
2009	Adagur H. Vishwanath	Indian National Congress
2014	Pratap Simha	Bharatiya Janata Party
2019	Pratap Simha	Bharatiya Janata Party
2024	Yaduveer Wadiyar	Bharatiya Janata Party

== Election results ==
=== General Election 1962 ===
1962 Indian general election: Mysore
Party	Candidate	Votes	%	±%
INC	M. Shankaraiya	97,949	42.85	
SWA	H. Ramaraj Urs	40,043	17.52	
PSP	M. N. Thimmaiah	39,167	17.14	
Margin of victory		57,906	25.33	
Turnout		240,484	55.52	
INC hold		Swing		

=== General Election 1967 ===
1967 Indian general election: Mysore
Party	Candidate	Votes	%	±%
INC	H. D. Tulsidas Dasappa	1,08,855	40.09	
Independent	B. N. Kengegowda	93,566	34.46	
SSP	T. N. Nagaraj	39,048	14.38	
Margin of victory		15,289	15.43	
Turnout		2,86,026	61.34	
INC hold		Swing		

=== General Election 1971 ===
1971 Indian general election: Mysore
Party	Candidate	Votes	%	±%
INC	H. D. Tulsidas Dasappa	2,13,724	74.41	
	M. L. Thimme Gowda	68,219	23.75	
CPI(M)	M. L. Nanja Raj Urs	5,824	1.84	
Margin of victory		1,45,505	50.66	
Turnout		2,97,698	59.10	
INC hold		Swing		

=== General Election 1977 ===
1977 Indian general election: Mysore
Party	Candidate	Votes	%	±%
INC	H. D. Tulsidas Dasappa	1,95,657	53.68	
JP	M. S. Gurupadaswamy	1,53,989	42.25	
Independent	S. Chikkamadu	10,798	2.96	
Margin of victory		41,668	11.43	
Turnout		3,64,491	62.99	
INC hold		Swing		

=== General Election 1980 ===
1980 Indian general election: Mysore
Party	Candidate	Votes	%	±%
INC(I)	M. Rajasekara Murthy	1,95,724	49.46	
INC(U)	H. D. Tulsidas Dasappa	1,12,688	28.48	−25.20
JP	M. S. Gurupadaswamy	71,491	18.07	−24.18
JP(S)	Siddaramaiah	8,327	2.1	New
Margin of victory		83,036	20.98	+9.55
Turnout		3,95,687	57.74	−5.25
INC(I) hold		Swing		

=== General Election 1984 ===
1984 Indian general election: Mysore
Party	Candidate	Votes	%	±%
INC	Srikantadatta Wadiyar	2,47,754	54.71	
Independent	K. P. Shanthamurthy	1,83,144	40.44	
	K. P. Vishwanath	5,696	1.26	
Margin of victory		64,610	14.27	−6.71
Turnout		4,52,885	61.74	+4.00
INC hold		Swing		

=== General Election 1989 ===
1989 Indian general election: Mysore
Party	Candidate	Votes	%	±%
INC	Srikantadatta Wadiyar	384,888	55.65	+0.94
	D. Mandegowda	1,35,524	19.60	
JD	P. Mallesh	1,31,905	19.07	
Margin of victory		2,49,364	36.05	+21.88
Turnout		6,91,602	69.74	+8.00
INC hold		Swing		

=== General Election 1991 ===
1991 Indian general election: Mysore
Party	Candidate	Votes	%	±%
INC	Chandraprabha Urs	225,881	39.47	
BJP	Srikantadatta Wadiyar	2,08,999	36.52	−19.13
JD	D. Madegowda	1,17,471	20.53	
Margin of victory		16,882	2.95	−33.1
Turnout		5,72,232	54.10	−15.64
INC hold		Swing		

=== General Election 1996 ===
1996 Indian general election: Mysore
Party	Candidate	Votes	%	±%
INC	Srikantadatta Wadiyar	258,229	34.82	−1.70
JD	G. T. Deve Gowda	2,46,623	33.25	
BJP	Thontadarya	1,62,630	21.93	
Margin of victory		11,676	1.57	−1.38
Turnout		7,41,726	62.54	8.44
INC hold		Swing		

=== General Election 1998 ===
1998 Indian general election: Mysore
Party	Candidate	Votes	%	±%
BJP	C. H. Vijayashankar	355,846	42.10	+20.17
INC	S. Chikkamadu	2,52,822	29.91	−4.91
JD	G. T. Deve Gowda	2,23,385	26.43	−6.82
Margin of victory		1,03,024	12.19	+10.62
Turnout		8,45,219	69.22	+6.68
BJP gain from INC		Swing	+12.54	

=== General Election 1999 ===
1999 Indian general election: Mysore
Party	Candidate	Votes	%	±%
INC	Srikantadatta Wadiyar	338,051	37.58	
BJP	C. H. Vijayashankar	3,24,620	36.09	
JD(S)	B. S. Marilingaiah	1,90,207	21.15	
Margin of victory		13,431	1.49	−10.7
Turnout		8,99,492	69.05	0.17
INC gain from BJP		Swing		

=== General Election 2004 ===
2004 Indian general election: Mysore
Party	Candidate	Votes	%	±%
BJP	C. H. Vijayashankar	316,442	33.05	−3.04
JD(S)	A. S. Guruswamy	3,06,292	31.99	+10.84
INC	Srikantadatta Wadiyar	2,99,227	31.26	−6.32
Margin of victory		10,150	1.06	−0.43
Turnout		9,57,267	64.74	−4.31
BJP gain from INC		Swing		

=== General Election 2009 ===
2009 Indian general election: Mysore
Party	Candidate	Votes	%	±%
INC	Adagur H. Vishwanath	354,810	36.43	+5.17
BJP	C. H. Vijayashankar	3,47,119	35.64	+2.59
JD(S)	B. A. Jivijaya	2,16,283	22.21	−9.78
Margin of victory		7,691	0.79	−0.27
Turnout		9,73,878	58.88	−5.86
INC gain from BJP		Swing	+1.29	

=== General Election 2014 ===
2014 Indian general elections: Mysore
Party	Candidate	Votes	%	±%
BJP	Pratap Simha	503,908	43.45	+7.81
INC	Adagur H. Vishwanath	4,72,300	40.72	+4.29
JD(S)	Chandrashekaraiah	1,38,587	11.95	−10.26
Margin of victory		31,608	2.73	+1.94
Turnout		11,59,628	67.30	+8.42
BJP gain from INC		Swing	+1.76	

=== General Election 2019 ===
2019 Indian general elections: Mysore
Party	Candidate	Votes	%	±%
BJP	Pratap Simha	688,974	52.27	+8.82
INC	C. H. Vijayashankar	5,50,327	41.75	+1.03
BSP	Dr. B. Chandra	24,597	1.87	
NOTA	None of the Above	5,346	0.41	
Majority		1,38,647	10.52	
Turnout		13,18,103	69.51	
BJP hold		Swing		

=== General Election 2024 ===
2024 Indian general election: Mysore
Party	Candidate	Votes	%	±%
BJP	Yaduveer Wadiyar	795,503	53.59	+1.32
INC	M. Lakshman	6,56,241	44.21	+2.46
NOTA	None of the above	4,490	0.30	−0.11
Majority		1,39,262	9.38	−1.32
Turnout		14,86,191	70.96	
BJP hold		Swing	+1.32	

== See also ==
- Coorg Lok Sabha constituency
- Mysore district
- Kodagu district
- List of constituencies of the Lok Sabha
