= Adagur H. Vishwanath =

Indian politician

Adagooru Huchegowda Vishwanath
- Adagur H. Vishwanath (2019)

Member of Karnataka Legislative Council
- In office 22 July 2020 – 21 July 2026
- Constituency: Karnataka

Member of Parliament, Lok Sabha
- In office 16 May 2009 – 17 May 2014
- Preceded by: C. H. Vijayashankar
- Succeeded by: Pratap Simha
- Constituency: Mysore

Member of the Karnataka Legislative Assembly for Krishnarajanagar
- In office October 1999 — May 2004
- In office December 1989 — September 1994
- In office March 1978 — June 1983

Personal details
- Born: 15 December 1949 (age 76) Krishnarajanagara, Mysuru State, India
- Party: BJP (from 2019)
- Other political affiliations: Indian National Congress (till 2017), Janata Dal (Secular) (2017–2019)
- Spouse: Shantamma (m. 1974)
- Children: 4
- Education: University of Mysore; Sarada Vilas College
- Profession: Advocate, agriculturist, politician

Adaguru Huchegowda Vishwanath (born 15 December 1949) is an Indian politician from Karnataka state. He is a leader of Bharatiya Janata Party. He is a Nominated Member of Karnataka Legislative Council. He was the former president of Karnataka unit of the Janata Dal (Secular).

== Career ==
Vishwanath has been in active politics since 1970s. He was a member of Karnataka Legislative Assembly for three terms, held State and Cabinet minister posts in the Government of Karnataka as member of Congress Party. In 2009, he contested 15th Lok Sabha and succeeded C. H. Vijayashankar. During his term as M.P., Vishwanath was also member of several committees. Vishwanath quit the Congress party to join the JD(S) in 2017 and got elected from Hunsur in 2018. He resigned as MLA and speaker has disqualified him from the legislative assembly on 28 July 2019. But in by-elections of December 2019 he lost to H P Manjunath of Congress party. In July 2020 he was nominated to Legislative council.

He is the author of book titled "Pracheena Parliamentgala Pradakshinegalu", which is on ancient parliaments. It was released on 17 August 2024 by Mysuru MP Yaduveer Krishnadatta Chamaraja Wadiyar.

== Positions held ==
#	From	To	Position
01	1978	1983	Member, 6th Assembly
02	1989	1994	Member, 9th Assembly
03	1999	2004	Member, 11th Assembly
04	1993	1994	Minister of State, Government of Karnataka
05	1999	2004	Cabinet Minister, Government of Karnataka
06	2009	2014	Congress Party Member, 15th Lok Sabha . From Mysore (Lok Sabha constituency)
07	2009	2014	Member, Committee on Urban Development
08	2009	2014	Member, Consultative Committee, Ministry of Human Resource Development
09	2009	2014	Convenor, Congress, Parliamentary Party (CPP), Karnataka
10	2018	2019	Assembly Member, with JD-S. From Hunasuru (Vidhan Sabha constituency)
11	2019		Joined BJP, but lost bypoll from Hunasuru.
12	2020		Elected to Legislative Council

== Controversies ==
=== Operation Kamala ===
Operation Lotus, also known as Operation Kamala, is a term coined in 2008 to describe a political strategy used by the Bharatiya Janata Party (BJP) in the Indian state of Karnataka. The operation was led by former minister G. Janardhana Reddy and involved efforts to secure support from legislators of opposition parties. This approach enabled the BJP to bypass the provisions of the anti-defection law and achieve a majority in the state assembly.

The term "Kamala" (or "Kamal") refers to the lotus, which is the electoral symbol of the BJP. Operation Kamala is commonly used in Indian political discussions to describe strategies involving the inducement or persuasion of MLAs and MPs from other parties—particularly the Indian National Congress (INC)—to support the BJP in forming or maintaining power in state legislatures where it does not have an outright majority.

He was one of the 15 MLAs who fell in Operation Kamala and resigned in July 2019, effectively bringing down the H. D. Kumaraswamy-led coalition government of Indian National Congress and Janata Dal (Secular).

== Bibliography ==
- Vishwannth, Adagur H. Halli Hakkiya Haadu. Ankita Pustaka. p. 184.
- Bombay Days - releasing soon

== See also ==
- 15th Lok Sabha
- Lok Sabha
- Politics of India
- Mysore (Lok Sabha constituency)
