= Periyapatna Assembly constituency =

Legislative Assembly constituency in Karnataka State, India

Coordinates: 12.34°N 76.1°E

Periyapatna
- Constituency No. 210 for the Karnataka Legislative Assembly
- Map of Assembly constituency

Constituency details
- Country: India
- Region: South India
- State: Karnataka
- District: Mysore
- Lok Sabha constituency: Mysore
- Established: 1951
- Total electors: 195,631 (2023)
- Reservation: None

Member of Legislative Assembly
- 16th Karnataka Legislative Assembly
- Incumbent K. Venkatesh
- Party: Indian National Congress
- Elected year: 2023
- Preceded by: K. Mahadeva

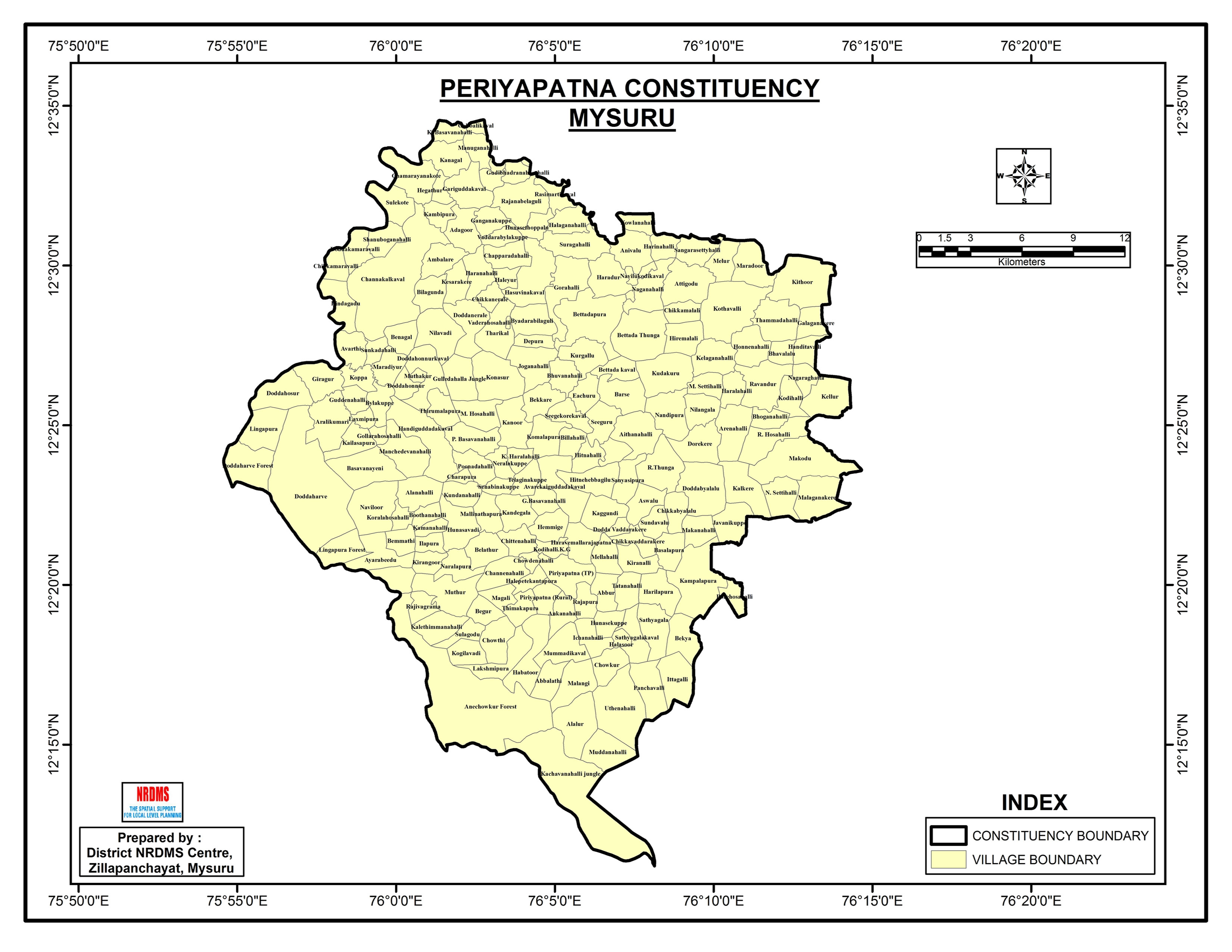
Periyapatna Vidhana Sabha Constituency Map

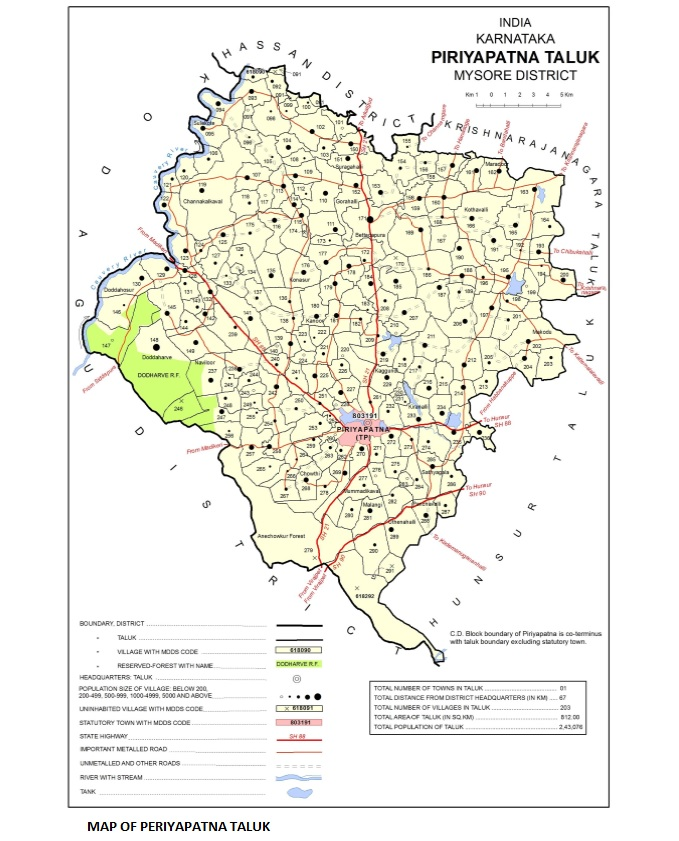
Taluk boundary same as Assembly constituency as per 2011 Census

Assembly Constituencies of Mysore district

Periyapatna Assembly constituency is one of the 224 Legislative Assembly constituencies of Karnataka in India.

It is part of Mysore district.

== Members of the Legislative Assembly ==
Election	Member	Party
1952	S. M. Mariyappa	Independent politician
1954 By-election (Note: Resigned on 1954)	H. M. Channabasappa	Indian National Congress
1956 By-election (Note: Re-elected)	H. M. Channabasappa	Indian National Congress
1957	N. R. Somanna	Indian National Congress
1958 By-election (Note: Died on 1958)	K. M. Devayya	Indian National Congress
1962	K. M. Devayya	Indian National Congress
1967	H. M. Channabasappa	Independent politician
1972	H. M. Channabasappa	Indian National Congress
1978	K. S. Kalamarigowda	Janata Party
1983	K. S. Kalamarigowda	Indian National Congress
1985	K. Venkatesh	Janata Party
1989	K. S. Kalamarigowda	Indian National Congress
1994	K. Venkatesh	Janata Dal
1999	H. C. Basavaraju	Bharatiya Janata Party
2004	K. Venkatesh	Janata Dal
2008	K. Venkatesh	Indian National Congress
2013	K. Venkatesh	Indian National Congress
2018	K. Mahadeva	Janata Dal
2023	K. Venkatesh	Indian National Congress

== Election results ==
=== Assembly Election 2023 ===
2023 Karnataka Legislative Assembly election : Periyapatna
Party	Candidate	Votes	%	±%
INC	K. Venkatesh	85,944	52.02%	▲6.89
JD(S)	K. Mahadeva	66,269	40.11%	▼9.83
BJP	C. H. Vijayashankar	7,373	4.46%	▲1.86
AAP	Rajashekhar Doddanna	1,533	0.93%	New
NOTA	None of the above	621	0.38%	▼0.38
Margin of victory		19,675	11.91%	▲7.10
Turnout		166,530	85.12%	▼1.19
Total valid votes		165,205		
Registered electors		195,631		▲8.41
INC gain from JD(S)		Swing	▲2.08	

=== Assembly Election 2018 ===
2018 Karnataka Legislative Assembly election : Periyapatna
Party	Candidate	Votes	%	±%
JD(S)	K. Mahadeva	77,770	49.94%	▲11.86
INC	K. Venkatesh	70,277	45.13%	▲5.73
BJP	Manjunatha. S	4,047	2.60%	▲0.23
NOTA	None of the above	1,178	0.76%	New
Margin of victory		7,493	4.81%	▲3.48
Turnout		155,748	86.31%	▲2.42
Total valid votes		155,716		
Registered electors		180,460		▲11.07
JD(S) gain from INC		Swing	▲10.54	

=== Assembly Election 2013 ===
2013 Karnataka Legislative Assembly election : Periyapatna
Party	Candidate	Votes	%	±%
INC	K. Venkatesh	62,045	39.40%	▲6.63
JD(S)	K. Mahadeva	59,957	38.08%	▲6.06
BSRCP	H. D. Ganesh	5,669	3.60%	New
BJP	R. T. Sathish	3,731	2.37%	▼22.05
BSP	Krishna	2,087	1.33%	▼5.33
Independent	K. S. Shashikumar	1,335	0.85%	New
Margin of victory		2,088	1.33%	▲0.58
Turnout		136,307	83.89%	▲4.58
Total valid votes		157,467		
Registered electors		162,480		▲9.79
INC hold		Swing	▲6.63	

=== Assembly Election 2008 ===
2008 Karnataka Legislative Assembly election : Periyapatna
Party	Candidate	Votes	%	±%
INC	K. Venkatesh	38,453	32.77%	▲10.47
JD(S)	K. Mahadeva	37,574	32.02%	▲3.13
BJP	Ganesh. H. D	28,652	24.42%	▲3.67
BSP	B. S. Ramachandra	7,814	6.66%	▼2.81
Independent	Chmarayanakote Jagadeesh	2,576	2.20%	New
JD(U)	Shashikumar	1,277	1.09%	New
Independent	Annegowda	1,001	0.85%	New
Margin of victory		879	0.75%	▼5.85
Turnout		117,376	79.31%	▲1.60
Total valid votes		117,347		
Registered electors		147,995		▼15.59
INC gain from JD(S)		Swing	▲3.88	

=== Assembly Election 2004 ===
2004 Karnataka Legislative Assembly election : Periyapatna
Party	Candidate	Votes	%	±%
JD(S)	K. Venkatesh	39,357	28.89%	▲1.22
INC	Chandre Gowda. K. S	30,372	22.30%	▼10.13
BJP	Ganesh. H. D	28,270	20.75%	▼14.16
JP	H. C. Basavaraju	19,263	14.14%	New
BSP	Krishna	12,897	9.47%	New
Independent	Shashikumar	2,070	1.52%	New
Kannada Nadu Party	Prakash. H	1,733	1.27%	New
Independent	Annegowda	1,399	1.03%	New
Independent	Lakshmi Narasimhachar	865	0.63%	New
Margin of victory		8,985	6.60%	▲4.12
Turnout		136,245	77.71%	▼0.47
Total valid votes		136,226		
Registered electors		175,319		▲10.25
JD(S) gain from BJP		Swing	▼6.02	

=== Assembly Election 1999 ===
1999 Karnataka Legislative Assembly election : Periyapatna
Party	Candidate	Votes	%	±%
BJP	H. C. Basavaraju	43,399	34.91%	▲26.03
INC	K. S. Kalamarigowda	40,320	32.43%	▲2.75
JD(S)	K. Venkatesh	34,398	27.67%	New
Independent	T. M. Nagaraju	6,199	4.99%	New
Margin of victory		3,079	2.48%	▼13.76
Turnout		124,323	78.18%	▼0.90
Total valid votes		124,316		
Rejected ballots		7	0.01%	▼1.59
Registered electors		159,015		▲6.91
BJP gain from JD		Swing	▼11.01	

=== Assembly Election 1994 ===
1994 Karnataka Legislative Assembly election : Periyapatna
Party	Candidate	Votes	%	±%
JD	K. Venkatesh	53,111	45.92%	▲25.91
INC	K. S. Kalamarigowda	34,326	29.68%	▼17.80
BJP	Chowdaiah	10,271	8.88%	▲8.06
KRRS	Lokesh Raje Urs. H. C	5,437	4.70%	New
INC	Vasanta Raju Urs. T. C	4,928	4.26%	New
BSP	Kamalamma. C	2,720	2.35%	New
Independent	Suresh Gowda. P. S	1,622	1.40%	New
Independent	Jagadeesh. C. S	1,376	1.19%	New
Independent	Venkatesh Murthy	791	0.68%	New
Margin of victory		18,785	16.24%	▼2.50
Turnout		117,626	79.08%	▲0.91
Total valid votes		115,671		
Rejected ballots		1,878	1.60%	▼4.04
Registered electors		148,741		▲12.12
JD gain from INC		Swing	▼1.56	

=== Assembly Election 1989 ===
1989 Karnataka Legislative Assembly election : Periyapatna
Party	Candidate	Votes	%	±%
INC	K. S. Kalamarigowda	46,460	47.48%	▲19.95
JP	S. M. Anantharamu	28,121	28.74%	New
JD	K. Venkatesh	19,578	20.01%	New
Kranti Sabha	H. S. Boralinge Gowda	2,880	2.94%	New
BJP	G. Shankarappa	806	0.82%	▼11.32
Margin of victory		18,339	18.74%	▲6.43
Turnout		103,698	78.17%	▼0.04
Total valid votes		97,845		
Rejected ballots		5,853	5.64%	▲3.93
Registered electors		132,659		▲27.91
INC gain from JP		Swing	▲7.64	

=== Assembly Election 1985 ===
1985 Karnataka Legislative Assembly election : Periyapatna
Party	Candidate	Votes	%	±%
JP	K. Venkatesh	31,764	39.84%	▲15.42
INC	L. Anand	21,951	27.53%	▼6.38
Independent	H. Sannappa	14,678	18.41%	New
BJP	K. R. Thammaiah	9,677	12.14%	▼12.13
Independent	Ningamma	872	1.09%	New
Independent	Akhila Chakravarthi Mallesh Maharaja	784	0.98%	New
Margin of victory		9,813	12.31%	▲2.82
Turnout		81,111	78.21%	▲4.84
Total valid votes		79,726		
Rejected ballots		1,385	1.71%	▼0.17
Registered electors		103,711		▲8.48
JP gain from INC		Swing	▲5.93	

=== Assembly Election 1983 ===
1983 Karnataka Legislative Assembly election : Periyapatna
Party	Candidate	Votes	%	±%
INC	K. S. Kalamarigowda	23,338	33.91%	New
JP	C. Ramaraje Urs	16,807	24.42%	▼17.88
BJP	K. R. Thammaiah	16,706	24.27%	New
Independent	K. Siddappa	7,886	11.46%	New
Independent	Venkatesh Murthy	1,272	1.85%	New
Independent	Kuntaiah	976	1.42%	New
Independent	Ningamma	727	1.06%	New
Independent	H. D. Krishne Gowda	514	0.75%	New
Margin of victory		6,531	9.49%	▼1.49
Turnout		70,141	73.37%	▼8.46
Total valid votes		68,825		
Rejected ballots		1,316	1.88%	▼0.54
Registered electors		95,603		▲14.69
INC gain from JP		Swing	▼8.39	

=== Assembly Election 1978 ===
1978 Karnataka Legislative Assembly election : Periyapatna
Party	Candidate	Votes	%	±%
JP	K. S. Kalamarigowda	28,152	42.30%	New
INC(I)	K. P. Kariyappa	20,847	31.32%	New
Independent	L. Anand	16,592	24.93%	New
Independent	Nagabhushanaradya. M. B	969	1.46%	New
Margin of victory		7,305	10.98%	▼0.63
Turnout		68,209	81.83%	▲11.95
Total valid votes		66,560		
Rejected ballots		1,649	2.42%	▲2.42
Registered electors		83,357		▲21.26
JP gain from INC		Swing	▼13.51	

=== Assembly Election 1972 ===
1972 Mysore State Legislative Assembly election : Periyapatna
Party	Candidate	Votes	%	±%
INC	H. M. Channabasappa	26,027	55.81%	▲33.29
INC(O)	K. P. Kariyappa	20,611	44.19%	New
Margin of victory		5,416	11.61%	▼43.35
Turnout		48,038	69.88%	▼4.91
Total valid votes		46,638		
Registered electors		68,740		▲19.73
INC gain from Independent		Swing	▼21.67	

=== Assembly Election 1967 ===
1967 Mysore State Legislative Assembly election : Periyapatna
Party	Candidate	Votes	%	±%
Independent	H. M. Channabasappa	31,287	77.48%	New
INC	K. P. Kariyappa	9,095	22.52%	▼31.47
Margin of victory		22,192	54.96%	▲46.99
Turnout		42,938	74.79%	▲19.58
Total valid votes		40,382		
Registered electors		57,413		▼1.51
Independent gain from INC		Swing	▲23.49	

=== Assembly Election 1962 ===
1962 Mysore State Legislative Assembly election : Periyapatna
Party	Candidate	Votes	%	±%
INC	K. M. Devayya	16,359	53.99%	▲4.95
SWA	T. Venkataram	13,943	46.01%	New
Margin of victory		2,416	7.97%	▼10.48
Turnout		32,182	55.21%	
Total valid votes		30,302		
Registered electors		58,291		
INC hold		Swing	▲4.95	

=== Assembly By-election 1958 ===
1958 Mysore State Legislative Assembly by-election : Periyapatna
Party	Candidate	Votes	%	±%
INC	K. M. Devayya	9,850	49.04%	▼19.04
Independent	T. Venkataram	6,144	30.59%	New
COM	B. N. Kuttappa	4,093	20.38%	New
Margin of victory		3,706	18.45%	▼17.71
Total valid votes		20,087		
INC hold		Swing	▼19.04	

=== Assembly Election 1957 ===
1957 Mysore State Legislative Assembly election : Periyapatna
Party	Candidate	Votes	%	±%
INC	N. R. Somanna	19,714	68.08%	New
Independent	T. Venkataram	9,244	31.92%	New
Margin of victory		10,470	36.16%	
Turnout		28,958	58.01%	
Total valid votes		28,958		
Registered electors		49,915		
INC hold		Swing		

=== Assembly By-election 1956 ===
1956 Mysore State Legislative Assembly by-election : Periyapatna
Party	Candidate	Votes	%	±%
INC	H. M. Channabasappa	Unopposed		
INC hold		Swing		

=== Assembly By-election 1954 ===
1954 Mysore State Legislative Assembly by-election : Periyapatna
Party	Candidate	Votes	%	±%
INC	H. M. Channabasappa	Unopposed		
INC win (new seat)				

=== Assembly Election 1952 ===
1952 Mysore State Legislative Assembly election : Periyapatna
Party	Candidate	Votes	%	±%
Independent	S. M. Mariyappa	12,447	51.10%	New
INC	H. M. Channabasappa	11,913	48.90%	New
Margin of victory		534	2.19%	
Turnout		24,360	64.37%	
Total valid votes		24,360		
Registered electors		37,845		
Independent win (new seat)				

== See also ==
- List of constituencies of the Karnataka Legislative Assembly
- Mysore district
