= Hunasuru Assembly constituency =

Legislative Assembly constituency in Karnataka, India

Coordinates: 12.31°N 76.29°E

Hunasuru
- Constituency No. 212 for the Karnataka Legislative Assembly
- Map of Assembly constituency

Constituency details
- Country: India
- Region: South India
- State: Karnataka
- District: Mysore
- Lok Sabha constituency: Mysore
- Established: 1951
- Total electors: 241,653 (2023)
- Reservation: None

Member of Legislative Assembly
- 16th Karnataka Legislative Assembly
- Incumbent G. D. Harish Gowda
- Party: JD(S)
- Alliance: NDA
- Elected year: 2023
- Preceded by: H. P. Manjunath

Hunasuru Assembly constituency, also spelled Hunsur, is one of the 224 assembly constituencies in Karnataka in India. It is part of Mysore Lok Sabha constituency.

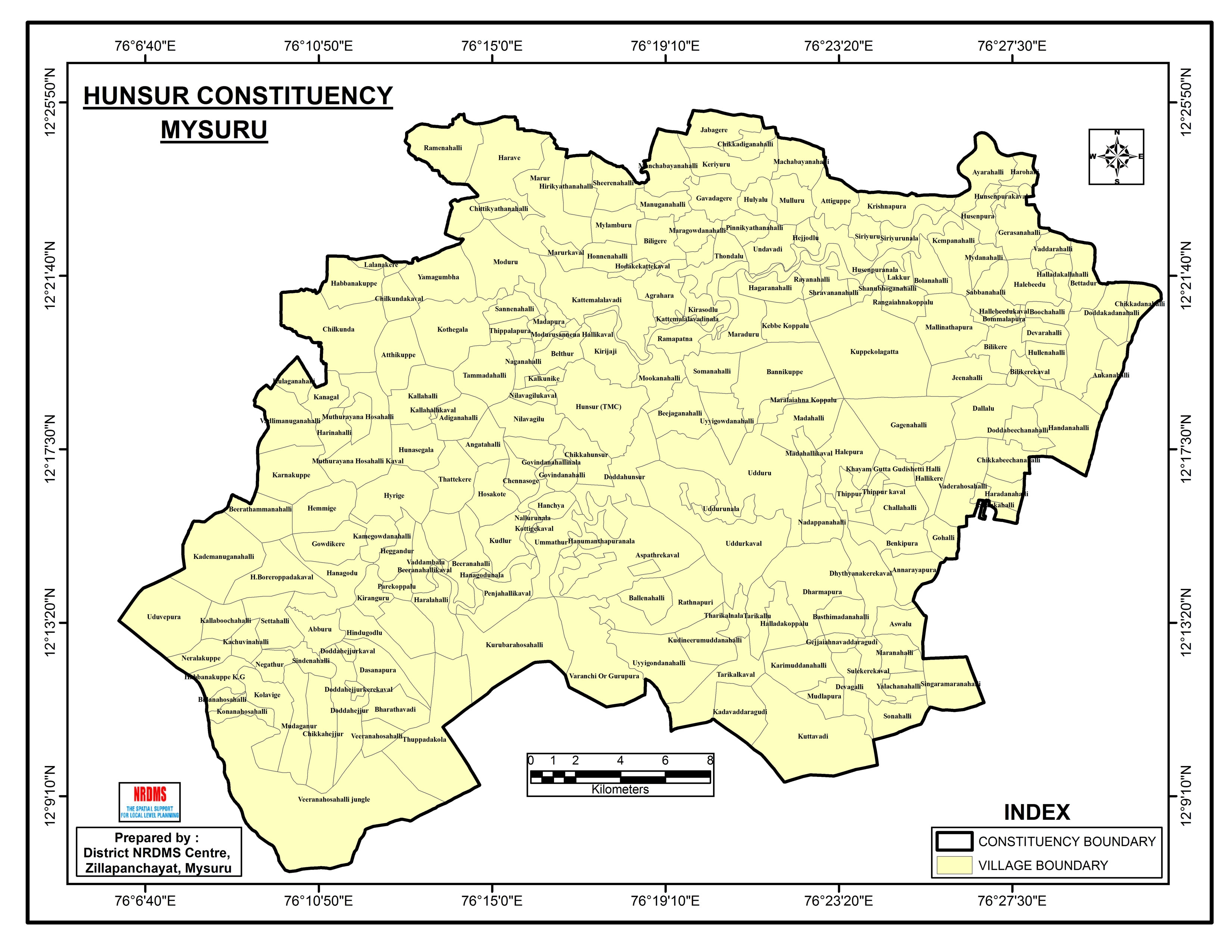
Hunasuru Vidhana Sabha Constituency Map

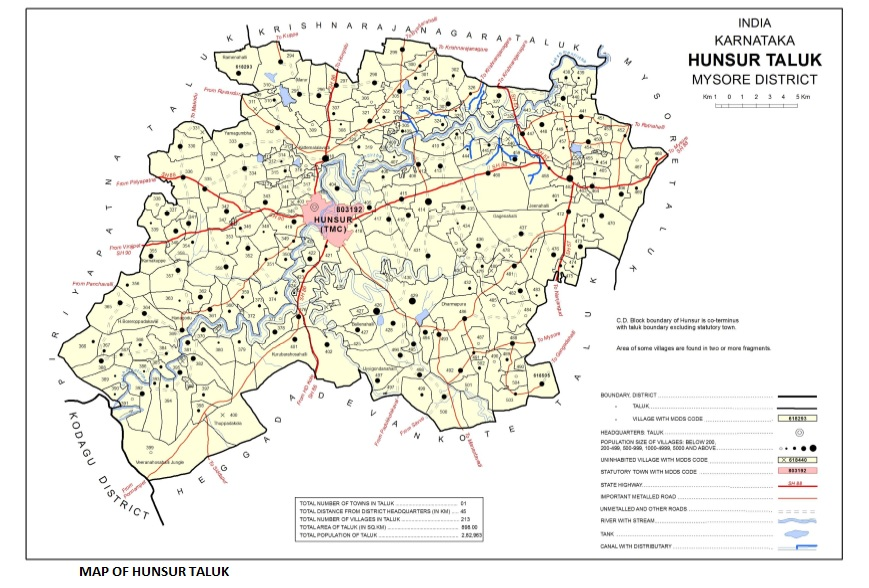
Taluk boundary same as Assembly constituency as per 2011 Census

Assembly Constituencies of Mysore district

== Members of the Legislative Assembly ==
Year	Member	Political party
1952	D. Devaraj Urs	Indian National Congress
1957	D. Devaraj Urs	Indian National Congress
1957	N. Rachiah	Indian National Congress
1962	D. Devaraj Urs	Indian National Congress
1967	D. Devaraj Urs	Indian National Congress
1972	U. Kariyappa Gowda	Indian National Congress
1972 (Note: By-Election)	D. Devaraj Urs	Indian National Congress
1978	D. Devaraj Urs	Indian National Congress
1983	Chandraprabha Urs	Janata Party
1985	H. L. Thimmegowda	Janata Party
1989	Chandraprabha Urs	Indian National Congress
1991	Chikkamadu S.	Indian National Congress
1994	C. H. Vijayashankar	Bharatiya Janata Party
1998	G. T. Devegowda	Janata Dal
1999	V. Papanna	Bharatiya Janata Party
2004	G. T. Devegowda	Janata Dal (Secular)
2008	H. P. Manjunath	Indian National Congress
2013	H. P. Manjunath	Indian National Congress
2018	Adagur H. Vishwanath	Janata Dal (Secular)
2019	H. P. Manjunath	Indian National Congress
2023	G. D. Harish Gowda	Janata Dal (Secular)

== Election results ==
=== Assembly Election 2023 ===
2023 Karnataka Legislative Assembly election : Hunasuru
Party	Candidate	Votes	%	±%
JD(S)	G. D. Harish Gowda	94,665	47.11%	▲29.12
INC	H. P. Manjunath	92,254	45.91%	▼4.81
BJP	Devarahalli Somashekara	6,258	3.11%	▼25.88
AAP	G. Ravikumar	2,912	1.45%	New
NOTA	None of the above	894	0.44%	▼0.10
Margin of victory		2,411	1.20%	▼20.53
Turnout		201,224	83.27%	▲2.76
Total valid votes		200,945		
Registered electors		241,653		▲5.89
JD(S) gain from INC		Swing	▼3.61	

=== Assembly By-election 2019 ===
2019 Karnataka Legislative Assembly by-election : Hunasuru
Party	Candidate	Votes	%	±%
INC	H. P. Manjunath	92,725	50.72%	▲6.10
BJP	Adagur H. Vishwanath	52,998	28.99%	▲25.55
JD(S)	Devarahalli Somashekara	32,895	17.99%	▼31.23
SDPI	Devanoor Puttananjaiah	1,124	0.61%	New
BSP	Imtiyaz Ahmed	1,098	0.60%	New
NOTA	None of the above	994	0.54%	▼0.28
Margin of victory		39,727	21.73%	▲17.13
Turnout		183,728	80.51%	▼2.53
Total valid votes		182,811		
Registered electors		228,211		▲1.60
INC gain from JD(S)		Swing	▲1.50	

=== Assembly Election 2018 ===
2018 Karnataka Legislative Assembly election : Hunasuru
Party	Candidate	Votes	%	±%
JD(S)	Adagur H. Vishwanath	91,667	49.22%	▲19.86
INC	H. P. Manjunath	83,092	44.62%	▼11.74
BJP	J. S. Ramesh Kumar	6,406	3.44%	▲0.60
NOTA	None of the above	1,534	0.82%	New
Margin of victory		8,575	4.60%	▼22.40
Turnout		186,525	83.04%	▲3.69
Total valid votes		186,228		
Registered electors		224,619		▲10.31
JD(S) gain from INC		Swing	▼7.14	

=== Assembly Election 2013 ===
2013 Karnataka Legislative Assembly election : Hunasuru
Party	Candidate	Votes	%	±%
INC	H. P. Manjunath	83,930	56.36%	▲16.79
JD(S)	Kumaraswamy	43,723	29.36%	▲0.14
Independent	C. T. Rajanna	12,637	8.49%	New
KJP	Manjunath Urs. M. C	9,011	6.05%	New
BJP	K. S. Annayanayak	4,229	2.84%	▼21.94
SDPI	N. Puttananjayya	1,745	1.17%	New
BSRCP	Dyavappanayaka	1,434	0.96%	New
Independent	Lokesha	1,292	0.87%	New
Margin of victory		40,207	27.00%	▲16.65
Turnout		161,588	79.35%	▲1.93
Total valid votes		148,917		
Registered electors		203,630		▲8.46
INC hold		Swing	▲16.79	

=== Assembly Election 2008 ===
2008 Karnataka Legislative Assembly election : Hunasuru
Party	Candidate	Votes	%	±%
INC	H. P. Manjunath	57,497	39.57%	▲5.67
JD(S)	Chikkamadu S.	42,456	29.22%	▼15.07
BJP	G. T. Devegowda	36,004	24.78%	▲10.10
Independent	B. N. Vasuki	2,261	1.56%	New
BSP	H. D. Mahadevanayaka	1,986	1.37%	New
Independent	Raju	1,265	0.87%	New
Independent	Hunsur. K. Chandrashekar	1,163	0.80%	New
Margin of victory		15,041	10.35%	▼0.04
Turnout		145,363	77.42%	▲3.10
Total valid votes		145,292		
Registered electors		187,752		▲2.56
INC gain from JD(S)		Swing	▼4.72	

=== Assembly Election 2004 ===
2004 Karnataka Legislative Assembly election : Hunasuru
Party	Candidate	Votes	%	±%
JD(S)	G. T. Devegowda	60,258	44.29%	▲18.94
INC	Chikkamadu S.	46,126	33.90%	▲16.16
BJP	Marilingaiah. B. S	19,967	14.68%	▼13.93
Independent	Hosurkumar	4,272	3.14%	New
Kannada Nadu Party	Dwarakish. B. S	2,265	1.66%	New
JP	Mahadeva. P	1,876	1.38%	New
Margin of victory		14,132	10.39%	▲8.11
Turnout		136,059	74.32%	▼0.65
Total valid votes		136,054		
Registered electors		183,068		▲11.93
JD(S) gain from BJP		Swing	▲15.68	

=== Assembly Election 1999 ===
1999 Karnataka Legislative Assembly election : Hunasuru
Party	Candidate	Votes	%	±%
BJP	V. Papanna	35,046	28.61%	New
Independent	Chikkamadu S.	32,256	26.33%	New
JD(S)	G. T. Devegowda	31,051	25.35%	New
INC	Chandraprabha Urs	21,736	17.74%	New
BRP	C. D. Raju	2,418	1.97%	New
Margin of victory		2,790	2.28%	
Turnout		122,614	74.97%	
Total valid votes		122,507		
Registered electors		163,555		
BJP gain from JD				

=== Assembly By-election 1998 ===
1998 Karnataka Legislative Assembly by-election : Hunasuru
Party	Candidate	Votes	%	±%
JD	G. T. Devegowda			
JD gain from BJP		Swing	▼31.04	

=== Assembly Election 1994 ===
1994 Karnataka Legislative Assembly election : Hunasuru
Party	Candidate	Votes	%	±%
BJP	C. H. Vijayashankar	35,973	31.04%	▲0.22
JD	V. Papanna	33,122	28.58%	New
INC	P. Govindaraju	23,945	20.66%	New
INC	Chandraprabha Urs	19,661	16.97%	▼17.95
BSP	Harihara Anandaswamy	1,484	1.28%	New
Margin of victory		2,851	2.46%	▼1.64
Turnout		117,461	78.45%	
Total valid votes		115,880		
Rejected ballots		1,528	1.30%	
Registered electors		149,718		
BJP gain from INC		Swing	▼3.88	

=== Assembly By-election 1991 ===
1991 Karnataka Legislative Assembly by-election : Hunasuru
Party	Candidate	Votes	%	±%
INC	Chikkamadu S.	33,467	34.92%	▼19.35
BJP	C. H. Vijayashankar	29,536	30.82%	▲29.58
JP	V. Papanna	24,884	25.97%	New
Independent	Shivasekhara	5,219	5.45%	New
Independent	Basararaju. S	994	1.04%	New
Independent	Somanna	736	0.77%	New
Margin of victory		3,931	4.10%	▼30.68
Total valid votes		95,836		
INC hold		Swing	▼19.35	

=== Assembly Election 1989 ===
1989 Karnataka Legislative Assembly election : Hunasuru
Party	Candidate	Votes	%	±%
INC	Chandraprabha Urs	51,086	54.27%	▲13.17
JD	Kariyappa Gowda. D	18,349	19.49%	New
JP	H. L. Thimmegowda	17,941	19.06%	New
Independent	Basararaju. S	3,096	3.29%	New
BJP	Mahadeva Rao Kadam	1,164	1.24%	New
Independent	Kittu. S	777	0.83%	New
Independent	Mahadevu	608	0.65%	New
Margin of victory		32,737	34.78%	▲31.61
Turnout		100,567	74.93%	▼2.06
Total valid votes		94,128		
Rejected ballots		6,439	6.40%	▲4.89
Registered electors		134,220		▲34.41
INC gain from JP		Swing	▲10.00	

=== Assembly Election 1985 ===
1985 Karnataka Legislative Assembly election : Hunasuru
Party	Candidate	Votes	%	±%
JP	H. L. Thimmegowda	33,516	44.27%	▼29.83
INC	Chandraprabha Urs	31,116	41.10%	▲18.76
Independent	Chikkachannappa	8,764	11.57%	New
Independent	Puttaraju	1,619	2.14%	New
Margin of victory		2,400	3.17%	▼48.59
Turnout		76,877	76.99%	▲1.70
Total valid votes		75,716		
Rejected ballots		1,161	1.51%	▼0.44
Registered electors		99,859		▲7.21
JP hold		Swing	▼29.83	

=== Assembly Election 1983 ===
1983 Karnataka Legislative Assembly election : Hunasuru
Party	Candidate	Votes	%	±%
JP	Chandraprabha Urs	50,951	74.10%	▲36.97
INC	Prema Kumar. H. N	15,363	22.34%	New
Independent	Malleswamy. H. S	864	1.26%	New
Independent	Chikkamadu S.	605	0.88%	New
BJP	Somegowda	516	0.75%	New
Independent	Mirza Mohammed Baig	461	0.67%	New
Margin of victory		35,588	51.76%	▲33.65
Turnout		70,124	75.29%	▼7.16
Total valid votes		68,760		
Rejected ballots		1,364	1.95%	▼0.53
Registered electors		93,142		▲12.53
JP gain from INC(I)		Swing	▲18.86	

=== Assembly Election 1978 ===
1978 Karnataka Legislative Assembly election : Hunasuru
Party	Candidate	Votes	%	±%
INC(I)	D. Devaraj Urs	36,766	55.24%	New
JP	H. L. Thimmegowda	24,711	37.13%	New
Independent	Chikkamadu S.	4,665	7.01%	New
Independent	G. Rangaswamy	409	0.61%	New
Margin of victory		12,055	18.11%	▼62.42
Turnout		68,243	82.45%	
Total valid votes		66,551		
Rejected ballots		1,692	2.48%	
Registered electors		82,771		
INC(I) gain from INC		Swing	▼31.67	

=== Assembly By-election 1972 ===
1972 Mysore State Legislative Assembly by-election : Hunasuru
Party	Candidate	Votes	%	±%
INC	D. Devaraj Urs	37,877	86.91%	▲35.38
Independent	G. Rangaswamy	2,778	6.37%	New
Independent	G. K. Mallaiah	1,968	4.52%	New
Independent	M. S. Sinddappa	584	1.34%	New
Independent	M. R. R. Bhagavatar	376	0.86%	New
Margin of victory		35,099	80.53%	▲52.97
Total valid votes		43,583		
INC hold		Swing	▲35.38	

=== Assembly Election 1972 ===
1972 Mysore State Legislative Assembly election : Hunasuru
Party	Candidate	Votes	%	±%
INC	U. Kariyappa Gowda	25,711	51.53%	▼7.15
INC(O)	H. Hombe Gowda	11,960	23.97%	New
Independent	S. Sanjeevaiah	8,093	16.22%	New
Independent	M. L. Nanjaraje Urs	2,667	5.35%	New
ABJS	Mahadeva Rao Kadam	940	1.88%	▼0.40
Independent	K. R. Shivarame Gowda	525	1.05%	New
Margin of victory		13,751	27.56%	▲7.92
Turnout		51,780	66.24%	▼2.28
Total valid votes		49,896		
Registered electors		78,166		▲25.25
INC hold		Swing	▼7.15	

=== Assembly Election 1967 ===
1967 Mysore State Legislative Assembly election : Hunasuru
Party	Candidate	Votes	%	±%
INC	D. Devaraj Urs	23,420	58.68%	New
Independent	Thimmappa	15,583	39.04%	New
ABJS	H. R. S. Setty	908	2.28%	New
Margin of victory		7,837	19.64%	
Turnout		42,763	68.52%	
Total valid votes		39,911		
Registered electors		62,409		
INC hold		Swing		

=== Assembly Election 1962 ===
1962 Mysore State Legislative Assembly election : Hunasuru
Party	Candidate	Votes	%	±%
INC	D. Devaraj Urs	Unopposed		
Registered electors		58,440		▼40.13
INC hold		Swing		

=== Assembly Election 1957 ===
1957 Mysore State Legislative Assembly election : Hunasuru
Party	Candidate	Votes	%	±%
INC	D. Devaraj Urs	21,259	24.14%	▼12.62
INC	N. Rachiah	20,583	23.38%	▼13.38
Independent	K. Lingappa	19,874	22.57%	New
Independent	S. Kuntaiah	13,333	15.14%	New
PSP	R. Peeranna	6,573	7.46%	New
ABJS	B. V. Rama Rao Sindhe	6,430	7.30%	▼2.50
Margin of victory		1,385	1.57%	▼19.07
Turnout		88,052	45.10%	▲0.27
Total valid votes		88,052		
Registered electors		97,608		▲158.78
INC hold		Swing	▼12.62	

=== Assembly Election 1952 ===
1952 Mysore State Legislative Assembly election : Hunasuru
Party	Candidate	Votes	%	±%
INC	D. Devaraj Urs	6,216	36.76%	New
Independent	B. L. Mari Gowda	2,726	16.12%	New
Independent	H. T. Thammaiah	2,317	13.70%	New
Independent	S. Kuntaiah	2,237	13.23%	New
KMPP	M. Chandrase Kharaiah	1,757	10.39%	New
ABJS	P. N. Rama Rao	1,657	9.80%	New
Margin of victory		3,490	20.64%	
Turnout		16,910	44.83%	
Total valid votes		16,910		
Registered electors		37,719		
INC win (new seat)				

== See also ==
- List of constituencies of Karnataka Legislative Assembly
