= Anil Chikkamadhu =

Indian politician (born 1989)

Anil Chikkamadhu (born 1989) is an Indian politician from Karnataka. He is a member of the Karnataka Legislative Assembly from Heggadadevankote Assembly constituency which is reserved for ST community in Mysore district. He represents the Indian National Congress Party and was elected in the 2023 Karnataka Legislative Assembly election.

== Early life and education ==
Anil is from Hunsuru, Mysore district. His late father Chikkamadu S was a farmer. He studied Class 10 at Talent High School, Hunsuru, Mysore District and passed the examinations in 2005. Later, he discontinued his studies. He runs his own business. His wife is a bank employee.

== Career ==
Anil was elected in the 2023 Karnataka Legislative Assembly election from Heggadadevankote Assembly constituency representing the Indian National Congress. He polled 84,359 votes and defeated his nearest rival, K. M. Krishnanayaka of the Bharatiya Janata Party, by a margin of 34,939 votes. He was first elected as an MLA winning the 2018 Karnataka Legislative Assembly election. In 2018, he got 76,652 votes and defeated his closest opponent, Chikkanna of the Janata Dal (Secular), by a margin of 22,103 votes.

He was appointed chairman for Jungle Lodges & Resorts Limited on 26 January 2024.
