= Srikantadatta Narasimharaja Wadiyar =

Indian politician and Maharaja of Mysore (1953–2013)

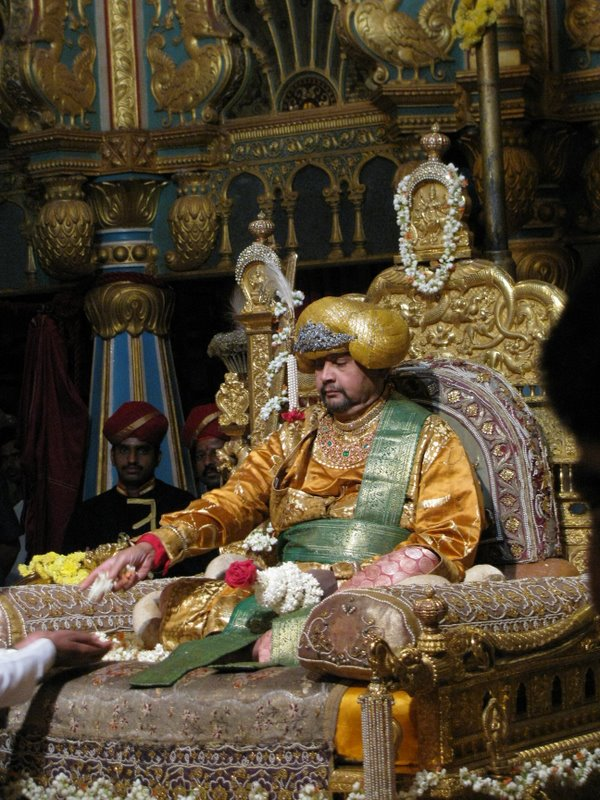

26th Head of the Wadiyar dynasty
- Tenure: 10 September 1974 – 10 December 2013
- Predecessor: Jayachamaraja Wadiyar
- Successor: Yaduveer Krishnadatta Chamaraja Wadiyar
- Born: 20 February 1953; Mysore, Mysore State, India (present-day Mysuru, Karnataka)
- Died: 10 December 2013 (aged 60); Bengaluru, Karnataka, India
- Spouse: Pramoda Devi
- Issue: Yaduveer Krishnadatta Chamaraja Wadiyar (adopted after his death by his widow)
- Dynasty: Wadiyar
- Father: Jayachamarajendra Wadiyar
- Mother: Tripura Sundari Ammani

Member of Parliament, Lok Sabha
- In office 6 October 1999 – 22 May 2004
- Preceded by: C. H. Vijayashankar
- Succeeded by: C. H. Vijayashankar
- Constituency: Mysore, Karnataka
- In office 15 May 1996 – 10 March 1998
- Preceded by: Chandraprabha Urs
- Succeeded by: C. H. Vijayashankar
- Constituency: Mysore, Karnataka
- In office 31 December 1984 – 20 June 1991
- Preceded by: M. Rajasekara Murthy
- Succeeded by: Chandraprabha Urs
- Constituency: Mysore, Karnataka

Personal details
- Party: Indian National Congress (1984–1991; 1996–2013)
- Other political affiliations: Bharatiya Janata Party (1991–1996)
- Occupation: Fashion designer; politician

Srikanthadattā Narasimharājā Wadiyar (20 February 1953 – 10 December 2013) was an Indian royal scion, politician, and fashion designer, who served as Member of Parliament from Mysore. He was the son of Maharaja Jayachamarajendra Wadiyar, the last king of Mysore.

As a fashion designer, Wadiyar promoted the sale of Mysore silk saris under his brand Royal Silk of Mysore. In the second half of the 20th century, the southern Indian silk industry was revived, and Mysore State became a top silk producer in India under his great-uncle Maharaja Krishnaraja Wadiyar IV's reign. After his demise, he was succeeded by his grandnephew Yaduveer Wadiyar as the head of the Wadiyar dynasty.

== Early life ==
Srikantadatta Narasimharaja Wadiyar was born on 20 February 1953 as the only son of Maharaja Jayachamarajendra Wadiyar and his second wife Maharani Tripura Sundari Devi. He had five sisters: Princesses Gayatri Devi, Meenakshi Devi, Kamakshi Devi, Indrakshi Devi, and, the youngest Vishalakshi Devi.

Wadiyar succeeded his father as the head of the Wadiyar dynasty after his father's death on 9 September 1974 and continued the traditional customs of the royal family including Mysore Dasara from 1974 until his own demise on 10 December 2013. He was succeeded by Prince Yaduveer Wadiyar.

=== Education ===
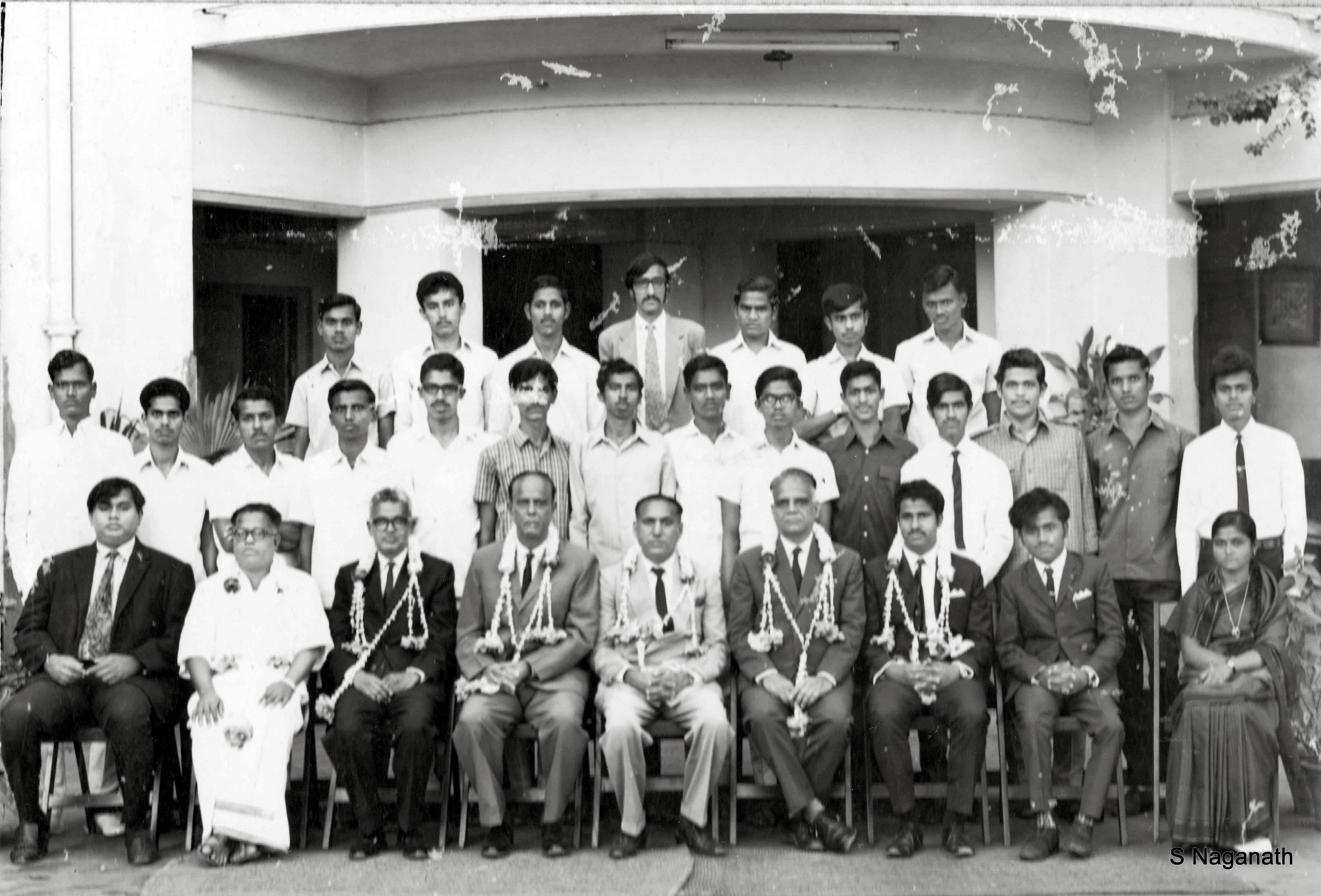
Srikanta Dutta Narasimharaja Wodeyar at Manasa Gangotri studying for the Bachelor of Arts (1972) (also seen: teachers – Prof. S. Ananthanarayan, Dr. C. D. Govinda Rao, Prof Mylari Rao and Prof. Putmadappa)

Wadiyar studied at the private Palace Royal School and completed his secondary school education in 1967. He took horse-riding lessons from the Government Riding School, Mysore. Wadiyar had a British and an Anglo-Indian nanny who groomed him. A Mr. Watsa was a mentor to him during his formative years.

He joined Maharaja's College, Mysore, in 1968 to pursue his one-year pre-university course and later earned a degree in Bachelor of Arts in 1972, pursuing it from 1969 to 1972, majoring in the English literature and political science. Wadiyar's minor subject was sociology. His second language was Kannada, tutored by Prof. K. Venkataramappa. He did his master's degree in political science at Manasa Gangotri, University of Mysore, from 1972 to 1974. He studied a course in law as an open-university student.

Wadiyar also studied Western classical music and Carnatic classical music. In his youth, he had studied the Vedas as well. He was awarded a gold medal for securing the first rank in Master of Arts in Political Science.

Throughout his college career, Wadiyar was a cricketer, like many Indian kings and princes, and had a collection of cricket bats signed by international test cricket players. Wadiyar's love of cricket led him to captain his university's team and later prompted his involvement in leading the Karnataka State Cricket Association as its president.

== Political career ==
Wadiyar was a longtime member of the Indian National Congress (INC) party. He participated six times in elections for Member of Parliament representing Mysore. He won four time as a member of the INC, and lost twice; once as a Bharatiya Janata Party (BJP) candidate and once as an INC candidate.

In 1984, Wadiyar first stood for Lok Sabha elections on an Indian National Congress ticket and defeated the independent candidate K. P. Shantamurthy. He joined the BJP in 1991, but lost the elections badly to Chandraprabha Urs of the INC. He moved back to the INC, and won Lok Sabha elections in 1996 and 1999, but lost the 2004 elections.

== Personal life ==
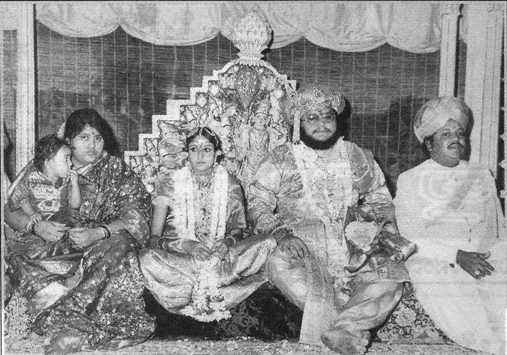
Srikanta Dutta Wadiyar's Wedding with Pramoda Devi (c. 1976)

Wadiyar was married to Pramoda Devi from the Bettada Kote Urs branch. She is a post-graduate in Hindi. The couple had no children.

He celebrated the royal tradition of Mysore Dasara by performing all the rituals which were conducted by his forefathers—the rulers of the Kingdom of Mysore. He conducted a khasagi (special) durbar during the Dasara festivities, where he ascended the golden throne at the Amba Vilas Hall of the Mysore Palace. Although he never had any legal or official title related to his role as head of the royal family, people referred to him with respect and endearment as 'Maharaja'.

=== Religious beliefs ===
Wadiyar said in an interview that he was an atheist for a brief period. He then resumed his Hindu theistic principles.

== Death ==
On 10 December 2013, Wadiyar died from cardiac arrest aged 60 at Vikram Hospital, Bangalore. He was cremated with full state honours at Madhu Vana, the burial ground of the royal family, at Mysore. On the day of his demise, the city of Mysore shut its business voluntarily in respect. The presiding chief minister Siddaramaiah declared a two-day mourning ceremony and a state government holiday. In addition, lightings of Mysore Palace were suspended for thirteen days as a symbol of grief. He was survived and mourned by his wife Pramoda Devi.

Wadiyar died without an heir; during the royal Dasara celebrations of 2014, his nephew Chaduranga Kantharaj Urs performed the rituals while the "khasagi" (private) durbar was conducted by placing the "pattada katti" (royal sword) on the throne.

On 23 February 2015, Pramoda Devi Wadiyar adopted Yaduveer Wadiyar as her son, making him the new head of the dynasty and posthumously Wadiyar's adoptive son. She conducted his anointment ceremony, thereby delegating him to conduct and continue the royal family customs and traditions.

== Legacy ==
The Karnataka State Cricket Association, of which Wadiyar was elected president just a few days before his death, named the Karnataka Premier League tournament after him. The University of Mysore renamed the Gangotri Glades Cricket Ground, earlier known as the University Platinum Jubilee Cricket Stadium, in Srikantadatta Wadiyar's memory. A sand sculpture of Srikantadatta Wadiyar was etched. A wax sculpture of his like was also created by wax-sculptor Shreeji Bhaskaran.

In 2014, India Posts issued a special cover depicting the private durbar of Srikantadatta Wadiyar.

== See also ==
- Wadiyar dynasty
- Kingdom of Mysore
- Jayachamarajendra Wadiyar
- Krishna Raja Wadiyar IV
- Mysore silk

Srikantadatta Narasimharaja Wadiyar Wadiyar Born: 20 February 1953
Titles in pretence
Preceded by Jayachamarajendra Wadiyar	— TITULAR — Custodian of Royal House of Mysore; 1974–2013; Reason for succession failure: Kingdom abolished in 1950	Succeeded by Yaduveer Krishnadatta Chamaraja Wadiyar
