= Chamaraja Assembly constituency =

Constituency of the Karnataka Legislative Assembly in India

Coordinates: 12.309°N 76.656°E

Chamaraja
- Constituency No. 217 for the Karnataka Legislative Assembly
- Map of Assembly constituency

Constituency details
- Country: India
- Region: South India
- State: Karnataka
- District: Mysore
- Lok Sabha constituency: Mysore
- Established: 1978
- Total electors: 246,297 (2023)
- Reservation: None

Member of Legislative Assembly
- 16th Karnataka Legislative Assembly
- Incumbent K. Harish Gowda
- Party: Indian National Congress
- Elected year: 2023
- Preceded by: L. Nagendra

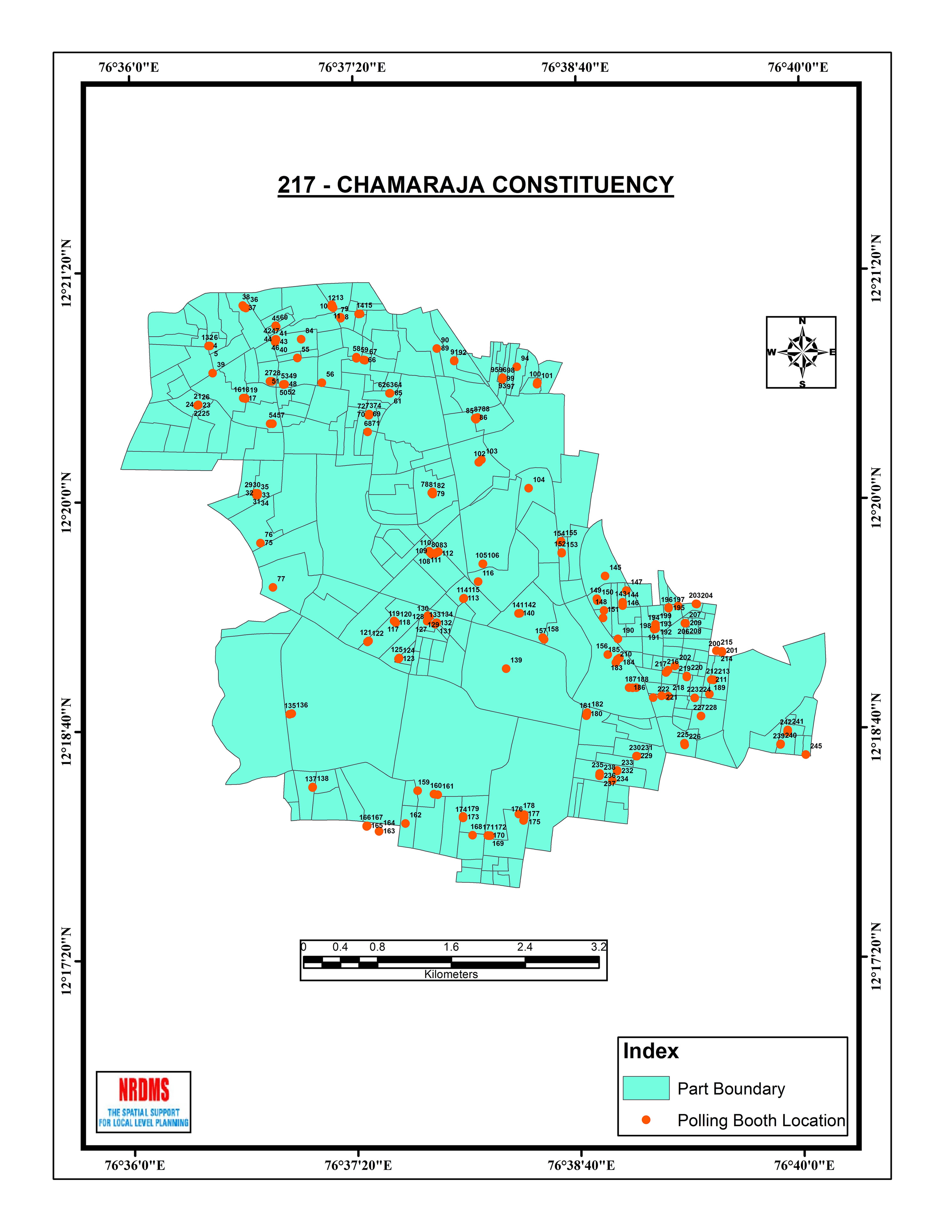
Chamaraja Vidhana Sabha Constituency Map

Assembly Constituencies of Mysore district

Chamaraja Assembly constituency is one of the 224 constituencies in the Karnataka Legislative Assembly and it is located in city of Mysuru in Karnataka in southern India. It is one of the 224 constituencies in the Karnataka Legislative Assembly. Chamaraja is also a part of Mysore Lok Sabha constituency. Mysore Palace, which is in the Chamaraja area, is a famous tourist attraction, and is known for its Dasara celebrations.

== Members of the Legislative Assembly ==
Election	Member	Party
1978	Kalastavadi Puttaswamy	Janata Party
1978 By-election	B. N. Kengegowda	Indian National Congress
1983	H. Kempegowda	Janata Party
1985	H. Kempegowda	Janata Party
1986 By-election (Note: Death of K. Kempere Gowda)	P. M. Chikkaboraiah	Janata Party
1989	K. Harsha Kumar Gowda	Indian National Congress
1994	H. S. Shankaralinge Gowda	Bharatiya Janata Party
1999	H. S. Shankaralinge Gowda	Bharatiya Janata Party
2004	H. S. Shankaralinge Gowda	Bharatiya Janata Party
2008	H. S. Shankaralinge Gowda	Bharatiya Janata Party
2013	Vasu	Indian National Congress
2018	L. Nagendra	Bharatiya Janata Party
2023	K. Harish Gowda	Indian National Congress

== Election results ==
=== Assembly Election 2023 ===
2023 Karnataka Legislative Assembly election : Chamaraja
Party	Candidate	Votes	%	±%
INC	K. Harish Gowda	72,931	48.42	▲22.28
BJP	L. Nagendra	68,837	45.70	▲8.93
JD(S)	H. K. Ramesh (Ravi). M. B. A	4,549	3.02	▼16.39
NOTA	None of the above	1,181	0.78	▼0.33
UPP	Prabha Nandish	907	0.60	New
Margin of victory		4,094	2.72	▼7.91
Turnout		151,544	61.53	▲1.86
Total valid votes		150,615		
Registered electors		246,297		▲4.51
INC gain from BJP		Swing	▲11.65	

=== Assembly Election 2018 ===
2018 Karnataka Legislative Assembly election : Chamaraja
Party	Candidate	Votes	%	±%
BJP	L. Nagendra	51,683	36.77	▲20.48
INC	Vasu	36,747	26.14	▲0.04
JD(S)	K. S. Rangappa	27,284	19.41	▲1.35
Independent	K. Harish Gowda	21,282	15.14	New
NOTA	None of the above	1,561	1.11	New
Margin of victory		14,936	10.63	▲2.59
Turnout		140,622	59.67	▲4.21
Total valid votes		140,554		
Registered electors		235,672		▲18.74
BJP gain from INC		Swing	▲10.67	

=== Assembly Election 2013 ===
2013 Karnataka Legislative Assembly election : Chamaraja
Party	Candidate	Votes	%	±%
INC	Vasu	41,930	26.10	▼6.93
JD(S)	H. S. Shankaralinge Gowda	29,015	18.06	▼1.66
BJP	L. Nagendra	26,168	16.29	▼25.65
SDPI	Shabbir Mohammed Musthafa	4,601	2.86	New
KJP	Aruna Gowda. M	4,399	2.74	New
Margin of victory		12,915	8.04	▼0.87
Turnout		110,078	55.46	▲4.29
Total valid votes		160,641		
Registered electors		198,475		▼3.73
INC gain from BJP		Swing	▼15.84	

=== Assembly Election 2008 ===
2008 Karnataka Legislative Assembly election : Chamaraja
Party	Candidate	Votes	%	±%
BJP	H. S. Shankaralinge Gowda	44,243	41.94	▼8.80
INC	Vasu	34,844	33.03	▲1.92
JD(S)	M. Prathap	20,806	19.72	▲5.63
Independent	M. Lakshmana	1,855	1.76	New
Independent	Shashidhar. M	1,012	0.96	New
BSP	G. Suresh Babu	903	0.86	New
CPI	Shafeeq Ahamed	803	0.76	New
Margin of victory		9,399	8.91	▼10.72
Turnout		105,503	51.17	▲2.32
Total valid votes		105,497		
Registered electors		206,169		▲33.80
BJP hold		Swing	▼8.80	

=== Assembly Election 2004 ===
2004 Karnataka Legislative Assembly election : Chamaraja
Party	Candidate	Votes	%	±%
BJP	H. S. Shankaralinge Gowda	38,193	50.74	▼4.95
INC	Nagaraju S. (Sandesh Nagaraju)	23,416	31.11	▲0.93
JD(S)	Umashankara	10,609	14.09	▲1.60
JP	Jayaprakash. S	1,676	2.23	New
Kannada Nadu Party	Nataraju	681	0.90	New
Margin of victory		14,777	19.63	▼5.88
Turnout		75,273	48.85	▼8.60
Total valid votes		75,273		
Registered electors		154,083		▲1.13
BJP hold		Swing	▼4.95	

=== Assembly Election 1999 ===
1999 Karnataka Legislative Assembly election : Chamaraja
Party	Candidate	Votes	%	±%
BJP	H. S. Shankaralinge Gowda	48,733	55.69	▲15.46
INC	Vasu	26,412	30.18	▲16.77
JD(S)	D. Druvakumar	10,931	12.49	New
Independent	H. K. Ramegowda	785	0.90	New
Independent	Binnukumara	650	0.74	New
Margin of victory		22,321	25.51	▲9.87
Turnout		87,523	57.45	▲2.23
Total valid votes		87,511		
Rejected ballots		12	0.01	▼1.47
Registered electors		152,354		▲2.22
BJP hold		Swing	▲15.46	

=== Assembly Election 1994 ===
1994 Karnataka Legislative Assembly election : Chamaraja
Party	Candidate	Votes	%	±%
BJP	H. S. Shankaralinge Gowda	32,620	40.23	▲34.36
JD	C. Basavegowda	19,937	24.59	▼2.89
Independent	D. Madegowda	12,406	15.30	New
INC	K. Harsha Kumar Gowda	10,875	13.41	▼29.02
Independent	Dr. Bhami. V. Shenoy	2,267	2.80	New
INC	P. Vishwanath	1,926	2.38	New
Margin of victory		12,683	15.64	▲0.69
Turnout		82,302	55.22	▲0.22
Total valid votes		81,081		
Rejected ballots		1,221	1.48	▼2.85
Registered electors		149,047		▲5.60
BJP gain from INC		Swing	▼2.20	

=== Assembly Election 1989 ===
1989 Karnataka Legislative Assembly election : Chamaraja
Party	Candidate	Votes	%	±%
INC	K. Harsha Kumar Gowda	31,514	42.43	▲2.73
JD	C. Basavegowda	20,408	27.48	New
Independent	H. S. Shankaralinge Gowda	8,466	11.40	New
JP	P. M. Chikkaboraiah	8,146	10.97	New
BJP	V. Mythili	4,363	5.87	New
Independent	Bhami Shenoy. V	580	0.78	New
Margin of victory		11,106	14.95	▲0.41
Turnout		77,629	55.00	
Total valid votes		74,271		
Rejected ballots		3,358	4.33	
Registered electors		141,147		
INC gain from JP		Swing	▼11.81	

=== Assembly By-election 1986 ===
1986 Karnataka Legislative Assembly by-election : Chamaraja
Party	Candidate	Votes	%	±%
JP	P. M. Chikkaboraiah	25,583	54.24	▼7.12
INC	B. N. K. Gowda	18,724	39.70	▲8.59
Independent	K. M. Gowda	2,171	4.60	New
Margin of victory		6,859	14.54	▼15.71
Total valid votes		47,164		
JP hold		Swing	▼7.12	

=== Assembly Election 1985 ===
1985 Karnataka Legislative Assembly election : Chamaraja
Party	Candidate	Votes	%	±%
JP	K. Kempere Gowda	32,077	61.36	▲13.01
INC	K. Harsha Kumar	16,265	31.11	▲7.71
BJP	C. Basavaraju	2,562	4.90	▼19.17
Independent	V. Narasimhaiah	712	1.36	New
Margin of victory		15,812	30.25	▲5.97
Turnout		52,882	50.80	▼7.05
Total valid votes		52,276		
Rejected ballots		606	1.15	▼1.02
Registered electors		104,093		▲18.84
JP hold		Swing	▲13.01	

=== Assembly Election 1983 ===
1983 Karnataka Legislative Assembly election : Chamaraja
Party	Candidate	Votes	%	±%
JP	H. Kempegowda	23,967	48.35	▼0.62
BJP	Puttegowda	11,932	24.07	New
INC	B. N. Kengegowda	11,601	23.40	New
Independent	Ramegowda	688	1.39	New
Independent	Peer Mohammed Safiulla	518	1.05	New
Independent	K. Vimala	342	0.69	New
Margin of victory		12,035	24.28	▲23.29
Turnout		50,669	57.85	
Total valid votes		49,568		
Rejected ballots		1,101	2.17	
Registered electors		87,589		
JP gain from INC(I)		Swing	▼1.61	

=== Assembly By-election 1978 ===
1978 Karnataka Legislative Assembly by-election : Chamaraja
Party	Candidate	Votes	%	±%
INC(I)	B. N. Kengegowda	20,234	49.96	▲9.70
JP	K. Kempere Gowda	19,833	48.97	▼5.57
Independent	H. P. Rangaswamy	436	1.08	New
Margin of victory		401	0.99	▼13.29
Total valid votes		40,503		
INC(I) gain from JP		Swing	▼4.58	

=== Assembly Election 1978 ===
1978 Karnataka Legislative Assembly election : Chamaraja
Party	Candidate	Votes	%	±%
JP	Kalastavadi Puttaswamy	24,524	54.54	New
INC(I)	B. N. Kengegowda	18,103	40.26	New
INC	M. N. Thimmaiah	1,489	3.31	New
Margin of victory		6,421	14.28	
Turnout		45,968	64.28	
Total valid votes		44,969		
Rejected ballots		999	2.17	
Registered electors		71,516		
JP win (new seat)				

== See also ==
- Mysore City South Assembly constituency
- Mysore City North Assembly constituency
- Mysore Taluk Assembly constituency
- Mysore South
- Mysore district
- Mysore Lok Sabha constituency
- List of constituencies of Karnataka Legislative Assembly
