= Kote M. Shivanna =

Indian politician

M. Shivanna (Kote)

Member of the Karnataka Legislative Assembly
- In office 1999–2004
- Preceded by: N. Nagaraju
- Succeeded by: M. P. Venkatesh
- Constituency: Heggadadevankote
- In office 1985–1989
- Preceded by: H. B. Chaluvaiah
- Succeeded by: M. P. Venkatesh
- Constituency: Heggadadevankote

Personal details
- Born: 1953/54
- Party: Bharatiya Janata Party (2015–present)
- Other political affiliations: Indian National Congress (Till 2008); Janata Dal (Secular) (2008-2015)
- Spouse: C. Deepa
- Children: 1 son and 1 daughter
- As of 25 September, 2006

Kote M. Shivanna was a member of the Karnataka Legislative Assembly of India. He represented the Heggadadevankote Assembly constituency and was a member of the Indian National Congress. Later he joined Janata Dal (Secular) political party and contested from Chamarajanagar Lok Sabha constituency during 2009 and 2014 Lok Sabha elections. He joined Bharatiya Janata Party and became president of Chamarajanagar district unit. He was the Chairman of Karnataka Safai Karmachari Commission from 2020 to 2023.

M. Shivanna was fielded by JD(S) as its candidate in the Chamarajanagar seat in the 2014 Indian general election. He himself declared that he is an aspirant for 2024 Indian general election from Chamarajanagar Lok Sabha constituency.
