= Heggadadevankote Assembly constituency =

Legislative Assembly constituency in Karnataka State, India

Coordinates: 12.09°N 76.33°E

Heggadadevankote
- Constituency No. 213 for the Karnataka Legislative Assembly
- Map of Assembly constituency

Constituency details
- Country: India
- Region: South India
- State: Karnataka
- District: Mysore
- Lok Sabha constituency: Chamarajanagar
- Established: 1961
- Total electors: 225,857 (2023)
- Reservation: ST

Member of Legislative Assembly
- 16th Karnataka Legislative Assembly
- Incumbent Anil Chikkamadhu
- Party: Indian National Congress
- Elected year: 2023
- Preceded by: S. Chikkamadu

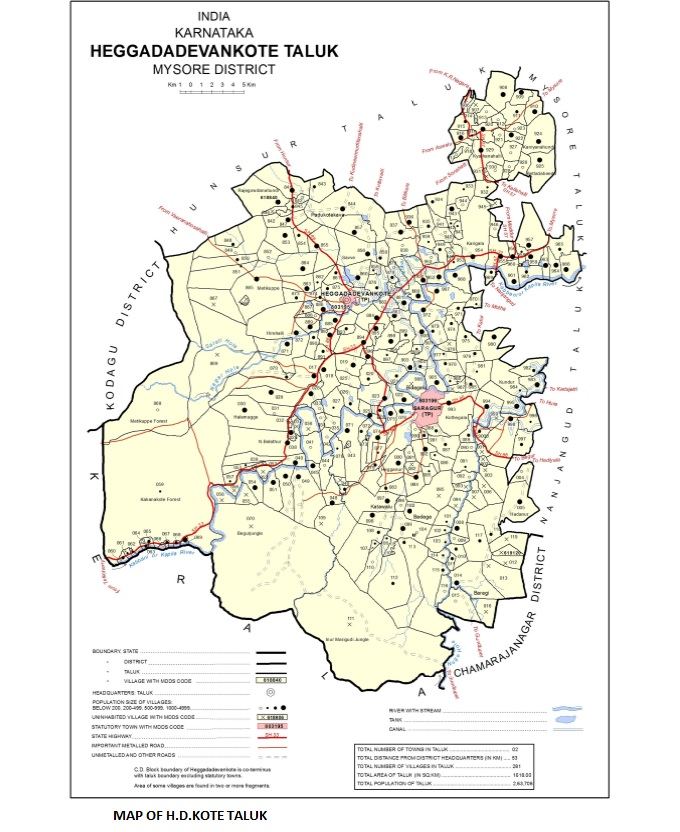
Taluk boundary same as Assembly constituency as per 2011 Census

Assembly Constituencies of Mysore district

Heggadadevankote Assembly constituency is one of the 224 Legislative Assembly constituencies of Karnataka in India.

It is part of Mysore district and is reserved for candidates belonging to the Scheduled Tribes.

== Members of the Legislative Assembly ==
Election	Member	Party
1962	R. Peeranna	Swatantra Party
1967	R. Peeranna	Indian National Congress
1972	R. Peeranna	Indian National Congress
1978	Susheela Cheluvaraj	Indian National Congress
1983	H. B. Chaluvaiah	Janata Party
1985	Kote M. Shivanna	Indian National Congress
1989	M. P. Ventatesh	Janata Party
1994	Nagaraju. N	Janata Dal
1999	Kote M. Shivanna	Indian National Congress
2004	M. P. Ventatesh	Janata Dal
2008	Chikkanna	Indian National Congress
2013	Chikkamadu S.	Janata Dal
2018	Anil Chikkamadhu	Indian National Congress
2023	Anil Chikkamadhu	Indian National Congress

== Election results ==
=== Assembly Election 2023 ===
2023 Karnataka Legislative Assembly election : Heggadadevankote
Party	Candidate	Votes	%	±%
INC	Anil Chikkamadhu	84,359	46.26%	▲1.45
BJP	K. M. Krishnanayaka	49,420	27.10%	▲6.97
JD(S)	Jayaprakasha Chikkanna	43,519	23.86%	▼8.04
NOTA	None of the above	1,184	0.65%	▼0.28
Margin of victory		34,939	19.16%	▲6.24
Turnout		182,390	80.75%	▲1.15
Total valid votes		182,371		
Registered electors		225,857		▲5.10
INC hold		Swing	▲1.45	

=== Assembly Election 2018 ===
2018 Karnataka Legislative Assembly election : Heggadadevankote
Party	Candidate	Votes	%	±%
INC	Anil Chikkamadhu	76,652	44.81%	▲19.20
JD(S)	Chikkanna	54,559	31.90%	▼2.57
BJP	Siddaraju	34,425	20.13%	▼2.03
BRP	J. K. Gopala	1,763	1.03%	New
NOTA	None of the above	1,596	0.93%	New
Margin of victory		22,093	12.92%	▲4.06
Turnout		171,061	79.60%	▲2.30
Total valid votes		171,053		
Registered electors		214,900		▲11.47
INC gain from JD(S)		Swing	▲10.34	

=== Assembly Election 2013 ===
2013 Karnataka Legislative Assembly election : Heggadadevankote
Party	Candidate	Votes	%	±%
JD(S)	Chikkamadu S.	48,606	34.47%	▲16.07
INC	Chikkanna	36,108	25.61%	▼8.87
BJP	Siddaraju	31,248	22.16%	▼2.31
BSP	J. K. Gopala	18,269	12.96%	▲4.78
KJP	Dr. H. V. Krishnaswamy	11,494	8.15%	New
BSRCP	Somanna. L	3,192	2.26%	New
Margin of victory		12,498	8.86%	▼1.14
Turnout		149,019	77.30%	▲9.08
Total valid votes		141,009		
Registered electors		192,789		▲4.90
JD(S) gain from INC		Swing	▼0.01	

=== Assembly Election 2008 ===
2008 Karnataka Legislative Assembly election : Heggadadevankote
Party	Candidate	Votes	%	±%
INC	Chikkanna	43,222	34.48%	▲10.76
BJP	K. Chikaveeranayaka	30,680	24.47%	▼5.83
JD(S)	M. C. Doddanayaka	23,064	18.40%	▼21.62
BSP	G. N. Devadatta	10,258	8.18%	New
Independent	B. Kavera	4,550	3.63%	New
Independent	Somanna. L	4,158	3.32%	New
Independent	M. Appanna	3,252	2.59%	New
Independent	Manjula Raju	1,600	1.28%	New
SKP	Jaji	1,548	1.23%	New
Margin of victory		12,542	10.00%	▲0.28
Turnout		125,373	68.22%	▼6.54
Total valid votes		125,372		
Registered electors		183,782		▲8.37
INC gain from JD(S)		Swing	▼5.54	

=== Assembly Election 2004 ===
2004 Karnataka Legislative Assembly election : Heggadadevankote
Party	Candidate	Votes	%	±%
JD(S)	M. P. Ventatesh	50,729	40.02%	▲26.11
BJP	Nagaraju. N	38,412	30.30%	▲15.53
INC	Kote M. Shivanna	30,064	23.72%	▼15.87
JP	Vijayalakshmi Singh. S. G	2,528	1.99%	New
Independent	Veera Raju. C	2,115	1.67%	New
CPI(ML)L	Chowdalli Javaraiah	1,569	1.24%	▼0.08
Kannada Nadu Party	Shivanagarya. M	1,337	1.05%	New
Margin of victory		12,317	9.72%	▼4.20
Turnout		126,787	74.76%	▼0.54
Total valid votes		126,754		
Registered electors		169,586		▲12.01
JD(S) gain from INC		Swing	▲0.43	

=== Assembly Election 1999 ===
1999 Karnataka Legislative Assembly election : Heggadadevankote
Party	Candidate	Votes	%	±%
INC	Kote M. Shivanna	45,136	39.59%	▲0.93
Independent	M. P. Ventatesh	29,268	25.67%	New
BJP	C. Nanjunda Murthy	16,832	14.77%	▲12.33
JD(S)	Devanooru Shivamallu	15,861	13.91%	New
Independent	Shivanagarya. M	2,076	1.82%	New
BSP	B. Prakash	1,977	1.73%	▲0.43
CPI(ML)L	Javaraiah	1,507	1.32%	New
Independent	N. Nanjaiah	1,341	1.18%	New
Margin of victory		15,868	13.92%	▲12.93
Turnout		114,000	75.30%	▲1.70
Total valid votes		113,998		
Rejected ballots		2	0.00%	▼2.11
Registered electors		151,401		▲4.92
INC gain from JD		Swing	▼0.05	

=== Assembly Election 1994 ===
1994 Karnataka Legislative Assembly election : Heggadadevankote
Party	Candidate	Votes	%	±%
JD	Nagaraju. N	41,208	39.64%	▲14.34
INC	Kote M. Shivanna	40,182	38.66%	▲6.41
Kranti Sabha	C. Nanjunda Murthy	12,442	11.97%	▲5.92
INC	H. R. Narayana	3,948	3.80%	New
BJP	B. Radha	2,534	2.44%	New
Independent	S. Ramaiah	1,542	1.48%	New
BSP	H. S. Devaraju	1,351	1.30%	New
Margin of victory		1,026	0.99%	▼1.55
Turnout		106,208	73.60%	▼0.96
Total valid votes		103,947		
Rejected ballots		2,242	2.11%	▼8.37
Registered electors		144,303		▲12.94
JD gain from JP		Swing	▲4.84	

=== Assembly Election 1989 ===
1989 Karnataka Legislative Assembly election : Heggadadevankote
Party	Candidate	Votes	%	±%
JP	M. P. Ventatesh	29,676	34.80%	New
INC	Kote M. Shivanna	27,507	32.25%	▼7.03
JD	H. B. Chaluvaiah	21,573	25.30%	New
Kranti Sabha	Pushapavathy	5,161	6.05%	New
Independent	B. Madaiah	692	0.81%	New
Margin of victory		2,169	2.54%	▲0.02
Turnout		95,272	74.56%	▲8.45
Total valid votes		85,284		
Rejected ballots		9,988	10.48%	▲8.67
Registered electors		127,775		▲23.92
JP gain from INC		Swing	▼4.48	

=== Assembly Election 1985 ===
1985 Karnataka Legislative Assembly election : Heggadadevankote
Party	Candidate	Votes	%	±%
INC	Kote M. Shivanna	26,286	39.28%	▲17.37
JP	H. B. Chaluvaiah	24,601	36.76%	▼17.55
Independent	M. P. Ventatesh	12,719	19.00%	New
Independent	B. K. Bettaiah	2,152	3.22%	New
Independent	B. N. Cheluvaraju	631	0.94%	New
Margin of victory		1,685	2.52%	▼29.88
Turnout		68,163	66.11%	▼1.83
Total valid votes		66,926		
Rejected ballots		1,237	1.81%	▼0.28
Registered electors		103,108		▲10.08
INC gain from JP		Swing	▼15.03	

=== Assembly Election 1983 ===
1983 Karnataka Legislative Assembly election : Heggadadevankote
Party	Candidate	Votes	%	±%
JP	H. B. Chaluvaiah	33,840	54.31%	▲25.41
INC	Susheela	13,652	21.91%	▲15.26
Independent	Nagaraju. N	6,888	11.05%	New
Independent	Kote M. Shivanna	4,353	6.99%	New
INC(J)	Thimmaiah. C	1,596	2.56%	New
Independent	Ramasingaiah. S	726	1.17%	New
Independent	Govindaswamy. L. M	633	1.02%	New
Independent	B. K. Bettaiah	623	1.00%	New
Margin of victory		20,188	32.40%	▲13.05
Turnout		63,641	67.94%	▼2.47
Total valid votes		62,311		
Rejected ballots		1,330	2.09%	▼1.12
Registered electors		93,669		▲10.71
JP gain from INC(I)		Swing	▲6.06	

=== Assembly Election 1978 ===
1978 Karnataka Legislative Assembly election : Heggadadevankote
Party	Candidate	Votes	%	±%
INC(I)	Susheela Cheluvaraj	27,821	48.25%	New
JP	H. B. Chaluvaiah	16,661	28.90%	New
Independent	R. Peeranna	9,342	16.20%	New
INC	K. M. Doddaiah	3,836	6.65%	▼41.90
Margin of victory		11,160	19.35%	▲16.45
Turnout		59,572	70.41%	▲8.07
Total valid votes		57,660		
Rejected ballots		1,912	3.21%	▲3.21
Registered electors		84,611		▲19.61
INC(I) gain from INC(O)		Swing	▼3.20	

=== Assembly Election 1972 ===
1972 Mysore State Legislative Assembly election : Heggadadevankote
Party	Candidate	Votes	%	±%
INC(O)	R. Peeranna	21,859	51.45%	New
INC	H. B. Chaluvaiah	20,628	48.55%	▼19.42
Margin of victory		1,231	2.90%	▼42.96
Turnout		44,101	62.34%	▲1.40
Total valid votes		42,487		
Registered electors		70,741		▲33.03
INC(O) gain from INC		Swing	▼16.52	

=== Assembly Election 1967 ===
1967 Mysore State Legislative Assembly election : Heggadadevankote
Party	Candidate	Votes	%	±%
INC	R. Peeranna	20,689	67.97%	▲36.21
Independent	H. B. Chaluvaiah	6,732	22.12%	New
SSP	Kote M. Shivanna	3,016	9.91%	New
Margin of victory		13,957	45.86%	▲30.38
Turnout		32,404	60.94%	▲2.25
Total valid votes		30,437		
Registered electors		53,175		▼6.28
INC gain from SWA		Swing	▲20.73	

=== Assembly Election 1962 ===
1962 Mysore State Legislative Assembly election : Heggadadevankote
Party	Candidate	Votes	%	±%
SWA	R. Peeranna	14,788	47.24%	New
INC	N. Rachaiah	9,942	31.76%	New
Independent	B. Rachappa	6,573	21.00%	New
Margin of victory		4,846	15.48%	
Turnout		33,299	58.69%	
Total valid votes		31,303		
Registered electors		56,738		
SWA win (new seat)				

== See also ==
- List of constituencies of the Karnataka Legislative Assembly
- Mysore district
