= Pratap Simha =

Indian politician

Prathap Simha

Member of Parliament, Lok Sabha
- In office 16 May 2014 – 4 June 2024
- Preceded by: Adagur H. Vishwanath
- Succeeded by: Yaduveer Wadiyar
- Constituency: Mysore

Personal details
- Born: 21 June 1976 (age 50) Sakleshpura, Hassan, Karnataka, India
- Party: Bharatiya Janata Party
- Spouse: Arpitha
- Children: 1
- Website: pratapsimha.com

YouTube information
- Channel: Pratap Simha
- Years active: 2014–present
- Genre: Politics
- Subscribers: 16.2 thousand
- Views: 1 million
- Last updated: 30 October 2022

Prathap Simha (born 21 June 1976) is an Indian journalist and politician who was a Member of Parliament for Mysore from 2014 to 2024, as well as a member of the Bharatiya Janata Party. Prior to his parliamentary terms, he was the president of the party's youth wing in Karnataka.

Simha was first elected in 2014 to the 16th assembly of Parliament with over 5 lakh votes. He was again voted in 2019 to the 17th assembly with a similar share, defeating his next opponent from the Indian National Congress with a margin of 1.39 lakh votes. He is the first candidate in the history of the constituency to have secured more than 5 lakh votes, until Yaduveer Wadiyar won with almost 8 lakhs in 2024.

== Early life and education ==
Prathap Simha was born on 21 June 1976 at Sakaleshpur taluk, Hassan district, Karnataka to B.E. Gopal Gowda and Pushpa. He holds a master's degree in communication and journalism from Mangalore University.

== Career ==
=== As journalist ===
Simha joined the Kannada-language newspaper Vijaya Karnataka in 1999 as a trainee. He was later elevated as the editor and functioned under senior editor Vishweshwar Bhat during the time. He wrote his column under the title Bettale Jagattu (The Naked World) espousing Hindutva and being fiercely critical of anybody opposing it. Writing an article for the Outlook in 2014, he claimed that with his book Narendra Modi: Yaaru Thuliyada Haadi (Narendra Modi: The Untrodden Road) written in 2008, Simha "introduc[ed] Modi to Karnataka." Expressing his desire to contest from the Udupi Chikmagalur constituency as a member of the BJP in the 2014 general election, his candidature was accepted by the party, but was asked to contest from Mysore. Then a journalist with Kannada Prabha, Simha resigned in April 2014 before beginning his electoral campaign, and subsequently winning the seat. He summed up: "In 33 days, I had gone from columnist to parliamentarian."

=== As politician ===
In June 2015, Simha was appointed as a member of the Press Council of India. As a politician and a Member of the Parliament (MP), Simha came to be known for his staunch stances in the promotion of Hindutva.

== Controversies ==
Simha's tenure as an MP was marked by several controversies. He was a vocal against government of Karnataka's birthday celebrations of Tipu Sultan starting 2015. He voiced that Sultan could be a "role model only for Islamists" and that the Chief Minister Siddaramaiah was "encouraging Jihadists" in the State. In 2017, against this backdrop, and police's prohibitory orders against taking procession of Hanuman Jayanti's organizers in Hunsur, a town in his constituency, Simha was arrested after he violated the prohibitory orders. In a widely circulated video, he was seen subsequently threatening the police officials and questioning their intent of "restricting" celebration of festivals of the Hindu faith, and barging through the barricade in his car.

In February 2017, Simha received criticism after he compared Gurmehar Kaur to Dawood Ibrahim. She was a student of Delhi University who spoke against the Akhil Bharatiya Vidyarthi Parishad, a student body affiliated to the Rashtriya Swayamsevak Sangh.

Simha courted controversy again in November that year while making statements against actor Prakash Raj after the latter questioned Prime Minister Narendra Modi's silence following "certain killings" in the country. Simha had tweeted, "Being sad due to son's death, having left your wife and ran behind a dancer, Mr. Raj, do you have any right to say anything to Yogi, Modi". He was subsequently sent a legal notice to by Raj calling for an unconditional public apology, and that failing which he would "press criminal charges" against him. Simha apologised publicly for his conduct.

=== 2023 Indian Parliament breach ===
In December 2023, a group that carried out a smoke canister attack inside Lok Sabha secured access using visitors' passes issued by Simha. The opposition demanded strict action against Simha and compared it to opposition Trinamool Congress MP Mahua Moitra's suspension. Moitra was suspended after her login credentials were found to be accessible by a businessman in Dubai. Congress workers protested outside Simha's office in Mysore and Karnataka chief minister Siddaramaiah questioned Simha's role and demanded a fair investigation by the Central Government into the affair.

== See also ==
- Tejasvi Surya
- List of members of the 17th Lok Sabha
