= K. Harish Gowda =

Indian politician

Member of the Karnataka Legislative Assembly
- Incumbent
- Assumed office 22 May 2023
- Preceded by: L. Nagendra
- Constituency: Chamaraja

Personal details
- Party: Indian National Congress

K. Harish Gowda is an Indian politician hailing from the state of Karnataka. He is a member of the legislative assembly (MLA) for Chamaraja Assembly constituency of Chamaraja, Karnataka. He is a member of the Indian National Congress.

== Career ==
In the 2023 elections, Gowda from the Indian National Congress, secured victory in the seat, defeating L. Nagendra from the Bharatiya Janata Party (BJP) by a margin of 4094 votes. He also contested the same Chamaraja Assembly constituency in 2018 Karnataka Legislative Assembly election and polled 21,282 votes and came fourth.

== Positions held ==
- 2023: Elected to Karnataka Legislative Assembly
