= Chandraprabha Urs =

Indian politician

Member of the Karnataka Legislative Assembly for Hunsur
- In office 1983–1991

Member of the 10th Lok Sabha from Mysore
- In office 1991–1996
- Preceded by: Srikanta Datta Narsimharaja Wadiyar
- Succeeded by: Srikanta Datta Narsimharaja Wadiyar
- Majority: 16,882

Personal details
- Born: 25 May 1946 Hunsur, Karnataka, India
- Died: 3 May 2016 (aged 69) Mysore, Karnataka, India
- Cause of death: Cardiac arrest
- Party: Indian National Congress
- Other political affiliations: Janata Party

Chandraprabha Urs (25 May 1946 – 3 May 2016) was a politician from Karnataka. She was a member of the 10th Lok Sabha and Karnataka Legislative Assembly. She was with Janata Party and Congress at various times.

== Early life ==
Urs was born on 25 May 1946 in Hunsur, Mysore district. Her father D. Devaraj Urs was a member of the Indian National Congress (INC) and went on to become the Chief Minister of Karnataka. She graduated from the Smt. VHD Central Institute of Home Science with a degree in library science.

== Career ==
As a member of the Janata Party, Urs won the 1983 Karnataka Legislative Assembly election from Hunsur and was appointed the Minister for Social Welfare, Sericulture and excise in Ramakrishna Hegde's cabinet. Later she joined the INC and served her second term in the state assembly from 1989 to 1991. In the 1991 Indian general election, INC made her its official candidate from Mysore against Bharatiya Janata Party's Srikantadatta Narasimharaja Wadiyar, the titular Maharaja of Mysore. She polled 225,881 votes against his 208,999; defeating him by a margin of 16,882 votes.

== Personal life ==
She married M.C. Mohan Raj Urs. Urs died on 3 May 2016 at a Mysore hospital after suffering a cardiac arrest.
