= Yaduveer Krishnadatta Chamaraja Wadiyar =

Ceremonial head of the Wadiyar dynasty and Indian politician

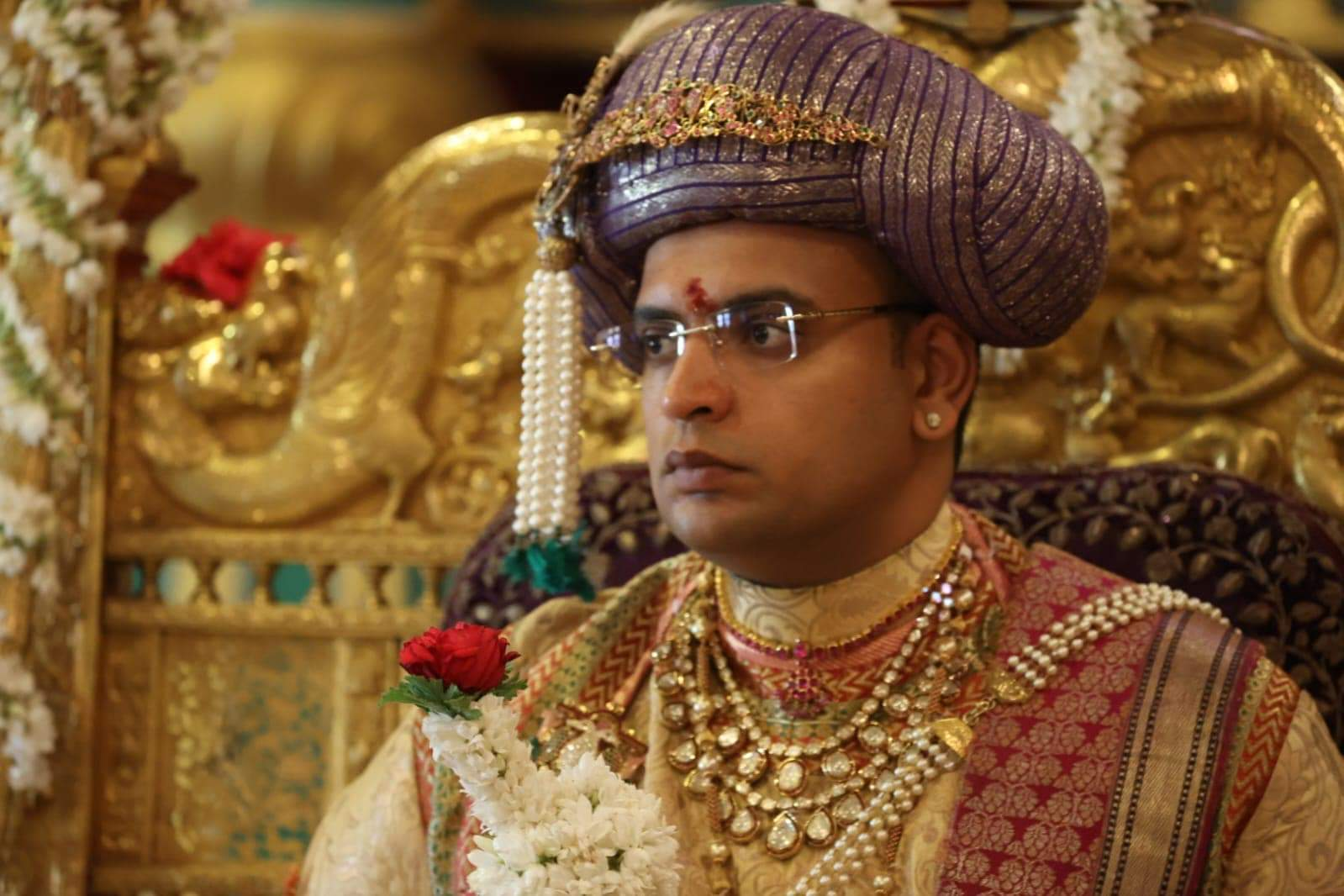
- Wadiyar in 2015

27th Head of the Wadiyar dynasty
- Tenure: 28 May 2015 – present
- Predecessor: Srikantadatta Wadiyar
- Heir apparent: Aadyaveer Narasimharaja Wadiyar
- Spouse: Trishikha Kumari Wadiyar (m. 2016)
- Issue: Aadyaveer Narasimharaja Wadiyar; Yugadhyaksh Krishnaraja Wadiyar
- Dynasty: Wadiyar dynasty
- Religion: Hinduism

Member of Parliament, Lok Sabha
- Incumbent
- Assumed office 4 June 2024
- Preceded by: Pratap Simha
- Constituency: Mysore, Karnataka

Personal details
- Born: Yaduveer Gopal Raj Urs; 24 March 1992 (age 34) Bengaluru, Karnataka, India
- Party: Bharatiya Janata Party
- Parents: Swarup Anand Gopal Raj Urs (father) Srikantadatta Narasimharaja Wadiyar (adoptive father); Tripurasundari Devi (mother) Pramoda Devi Wadiyar (adoptive mother)

Yaduveer Krishnadatta Chamaraja Wadiyar (born 24 March 1992) is an Indian politician and ceremonial head of the Wadiyar dynasty. He has served as the Member of Parliament for Mysore since 2024, representing the Bharatiya Janata Party.

Born Yaduveer Gopal Raj Urs, he was adopted in February 2015 by Pramoda Devi Wadiyar, widow of Srikantadatta Narasimharaja Wadiyar, and was installed as the titular 27th Maharaja of Mysore on 28 May 2015. (Note: Princely titles, privileges and privy purses were abolished in India by the Twenty-sixth Amendment of the Constitution of India in 1971. The title is therefore ceremonial and used within family, cultural and religious contexts.)

== Early life and education ==
Wadiyar was born Yaduveer Gopal Raj Urs in Bengaluru, Karnataka, to Swarup Anand Gopal Raj Urs and Tripurasundari Devi. Through his mother, he is a great-grandson of Jayachamarajendra Wadiyar, the last ruling Maharaja of Mysore before the princely state acceded to India.

He studied in Bengaluru at Vidya Niketan School and the Canadian International School. He later studied economics and English at the University of Massachusetts Amherst.

== Head of the Wadiyar dynasty ==
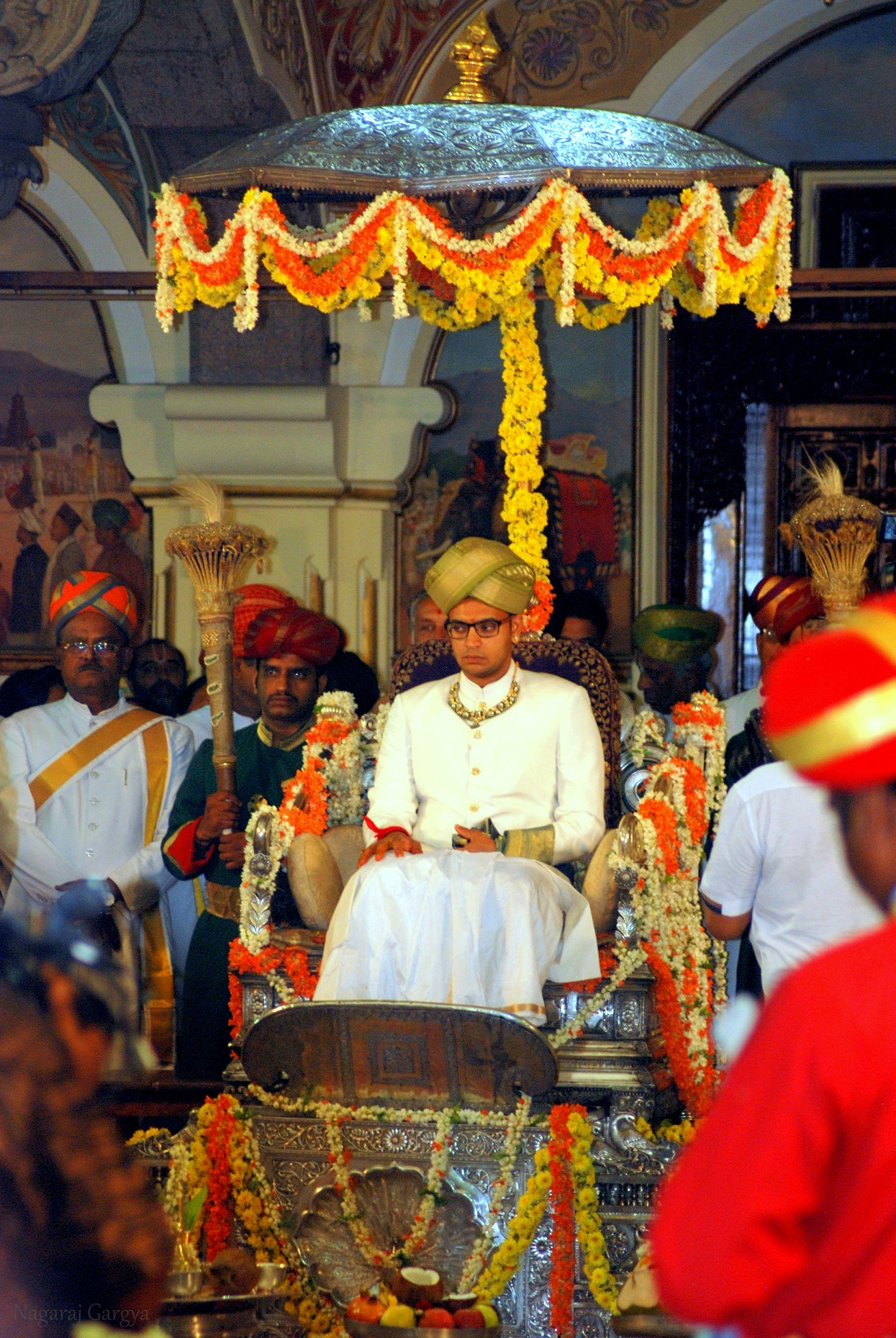
Wadiyar at his installation ceremony

Srikantadatta Narasimharaja Wadiyar, the previous head of the Wadiyar dynasty, died on 10 December 2013 without a child. His widow, Pramoda Devi Wadiyar, adopted Yaduveer Gopal Raj Urs as heir to the family. The adoption ceremony took place at the Mysore Palace on 23 February 2015, after which he was renamed Yaduveer Krishnadatta Chamaraja Wadiyar.

Wadiyar was installed as the 27th head of the former Mysore royal family on 28 May 2015, at the age of 23. On 13 October 2015, during his first Mysore Dasara after the installation, Wadiyar ascended the golden throne at the Mysore Palace and conducted his debut khasagi durbar, or private durbar.

The adoption was challenged in a Mysuru civil court in 2015 by Chaduranga Kantharaj Urs, a nephew of Srikantadatta Wadiyar, who argued that it was invalid under the Hindu Adoptions and Maintenance Act, 1956.

== Personal life ==
Wadiyar married Trishikha Kumari Wadiyar, daughter of Harshvardhan Singh and Maheshree Kumari of the former Dungarpur royal family, on 27 June 2016. Their first son, Aadyaveer Narasimharaja Wadiyar, was born on 6 December 2017 in Bengaluru. Their second son, Yugadhyaksh Krishnaraja Wadiyar, was born on 11 October 2024 in Mysuru.

== Political career ==
In March 2024, the Bharatiya Janata Party named Wadiyar as its candidate for the Mysore Lok Sabha constituency in the 2024 Indian general election, replacing sitting MP Pratap Simha.

He won the seat on 4 June 2024, defeating Indian National Congress candidate M. Lakshmana by 139,262 votes.

Wadiyar has served as a member of the Committee on Science and Technology, Environment, Forests and Climate Change since 26 September 2025.

== Election results ==
2024 Indian general election: Mysore
Party	Candidate	Votes	%
BJP	Yaduveer Krishnadatta Chamaraja Wadiyar	795,503	53.75
INC	M. Lakshmana	656,241	44.34
None of the Above	NOTA	4,490	0.30
Majority		139,262	9.41
Turnout		1,486,191	70.96
BJP hold			

== See also ==
- Wadiyar dynasty
- Yaduraya Wodeyar
- Mysore Palace
- Mysore Dasara

== Notes ==
Yaduveer Krishnadatta Chamaraja Wadiyar Wadiyar Born: 24 March 1992
Titles in pretence
Preceded by Srikantadatta Narasimharaja Wadiyar	— TITULAR — Custodian of Royal House of Mysore; 28 May 2015 – present Reason for succession failure: Kingdom abolished in 1950	Incumbent
