= Chikkamadu S. =

Indian politician

Member of the Karnataka Legislative Assembly
- In office 2013–2017
- Preceded by: Chikkanna
- Succeeded by: Anil Chikkamadu
- Constituency: Heggadadevankote

Member of the Karnataka Legislative Assembly
- In office 1991–1994
- Preceded by: Chandraprabha Urs
- Succeeded by: C. H. Vijayashankar
- Constituency: Hunsur

Personal details
- Born: 7 March 1951 Kallahalli, Mysore State, India)
- Died: 1 November 2017 (aged 66) Mysore, India
- Party: Janata Dal (Secular)
- Occupation: Politician

Chikkamadu S was an Indian Politician from the state of Karnataka. He was a member of the Karnataka Legislative Assembly.

== Constituency ==
He represented the Heggadadevankote constituency. He died on 1 November 2017 in Mysore due to liver cancer.

== Political Party ==
He was from the Janata Dal (Secular).
