= K. Venkatesh =

Indian politician

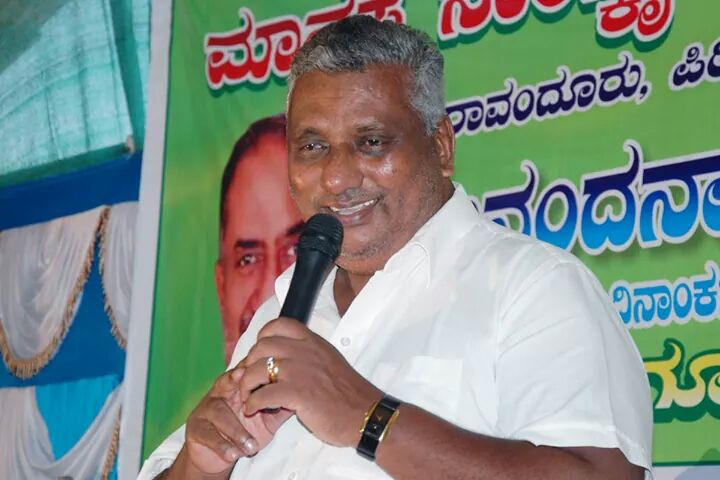

Cabinet Minister, Government of Karnataka
- In office 27 May 2023 – 29 May 2026
- Governor: Thawarchand Gehlot
- Cabinet: Second Siddaramaiah ministry
- Chief Minister: Siddaramaiah
- Ministry and Departments: Animal Husbandry & Sericulture also Planning and Statistical department

Member of Karnataka Legislative Assembly
- Incumbent
- Assumed office May 2023
- Preceded by: K. Mahadeva
- Constituency: Periyapatna
- In office 2004–2018
- Preceded by: H C Basavaraju
- Succeeded by: K. Mahadeva
- Constituency: Periyapatna

Personal details
- Born: Kittur, Periyapatna, Karnataka, India
- Party: Indian National Congress
- Other political affiliations: Janata Dal (Secular)
- Occupation: Politician

K. Venkatesh (born in Kittur Periyapatna) is an Indian politician from Karnataka. He is currently serving as a member of the Karnataka Legislative Assembly representing Periyapatna and served as Cabinet Minister in the Government of Karnataka from 2023 to 2026. He is a member of the Indian National Congress.

He was inducted into Siddiramaiah’s Cabinet on 27 May 2023 as minister for Animal Husbandry and Sericulture.

K. Venkatesh has been appointed as Bangalore Development Authority Chairman in 2016.
