= C. H. Vijayashankar =

Governor of Meghalaya

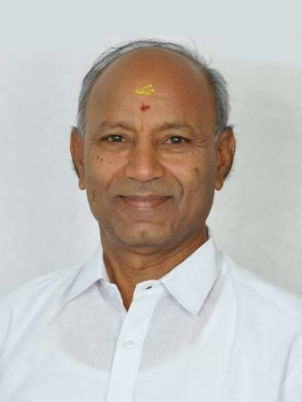
- Vijayashankar, c. 2026

Governor of Meghalaya
- Incumbent
- Assumed office 30 July 2024
- Chief Minister: Conrad Sangma
- Preceded by: Phagu Chauhan

Cabinet Minister in Karnataka
- In office 23 September 2010 – 4 August 2011
- Ministry: Term
- Forest and Environment: 23 September 2010 – 4 August 2011

Member of Parliament, Lok Sabha
- In office 2004–2009
- Preceded by: Srikanta Datta Narsimharaja Wadiyar
- Succeeded by: H. Vishwanath
- Constituency: Mysore, Karnataka
- In office 1998–1999
- Preceded by: Srikanta Datta Narsimharaja Wadiyar
- Succeeded by: Srikanta Datta Narsimharaja Wadiyar
- Constituency: Mysore, Karnataka

Member of Karnataka Legislative Council
- In office 15 June 2010 – 14 June 2016
- Constituency: elected by Legislative Assembly members

Member of Karnataka Legislative Assembly
- In office 1994–1998
- Preceded by: Chikkamadu S
- Succeeded by: V Papanna
- Constituency: Hunsur

Personal details
- Born: 21 October 1956 (age 69) Makanur, Ranebennuru, Karnataka, India
- Party: Bharatiya Janata Party (1991-2017 & since 2019)
- Other political affiliations: Indian National Congress (2017–2019)
- Children: 3 (1 son and 2 daughters)
- As of 23 September, 2006

Chandrashekhar H. Vijayashankar (born 21 October 1956) is an Indian politician. He serves as the Governor of Meghalaya since 2024. He is a member of the Bharatiya Janata Party.

== Career ==
He was a member of the 14th Lok Sabha of India where he represented the Mysore constituency of Karnataka. He was elected member of Karnataka legislative assembly from Hunsur in 1994. In 1998, he was elected to the 12th Lok Sabha from Mysore Lok Sabha constituency. He was re-elected to Mysore Lok Sabha constituency in 2004 against Srikantadatta Narasimharaja Wadiyar, who was the prince of Mysore Kingdom.

He served as a cabinet minister in the government of Karnataka holding the Forest, ecology and environment department from 2009 to 2011.

He was a member of the Karnataka Legislative Council from 15 June 2010 till the end of his tenure in Jan 2016.

He unsuccessfully contested the 2014 Lok Sabha elections from Hassan constituency in 2014 as a BJP candidate against former Prime Minister H. D. Deve Gowda.

He resigned from BJP and joined Indian National Congress in October 2017. He rejoined BJP in November 2019.

President Droupadi Murmu appointed Vijayashankar as Governor of Meghalaya on 27 June 2024.

== See also ==
- List of members of the 14th Lok Sabha (by state)
