= 16th Karnataka Assembly =

Karnataka state legislative session (2023-2028)

| ← | 15th |

Overview
- Legislative body: Karnataka Legislative Assembly
- Jurisdiction: Karnataka, India
- Meeting place: Vidhana Soudha, Bengaluru; Suvarna Vidhana Soudha, Belagavi (Winter session)
- Term: 22 May 2023 –
- Election: 2023 Karnataka Legislative Assembly election
- Government: D. K. Shivakumar ministry
- Opposition: BJP
- Website: Karnataka Legislative Assembly
- Members: 224
- Chief Minister: D. K. Shivakumar
- Deputy Chief Minister: G. Parameshwara
- Speaker: G. S. Patil
- Deputy Speaker: Mankala Vaidya
- Leader of the Opposition: R. Ashoka
- Deputy Leader of the Opposition: Arvind Bellad

The 16th Legislative Assembly of Karnataka was formed following the 2023 Assembly election for all 224 seats. The election were held on 10 May 2023 and the results were declared on 13 May 2023.

== Leadership ==
The assembly was initially governed by the Second Siddaramaiah ministry, sworn in on 20 May 2023 with Siddaramaiah as Chief Minister and D. K. Shivakumar as Deputy Chief Minister. Following an internal Congress leadership transition, Siddaramaiah resigned on 29 May 2026. The D. K. Shivakumar ministry was sworn in on 3 June 2026, with D. K. Shivakumar as Chief Minister and G. Parameshwara as Deputy Chief Minister.

== Composition ==
| Alliance | Political party | No. of MLAs (Note: Figures reflect party position as of June 2026, accounting for by-elections, expulsions, and deaths during the term.) | Leader of the party in the Assembly |
|---|---|---|---|
| Government; INDIA; Seats: 140 | Indian National Congress | 136 | D. K. Shivakumar (Chief Minister) |
| Government; INDIA; Seats: 140 | Sarvodaya Karnataka Paksha | 1 | Darshan Puttannaiah |
| Government; INDIA; Seats: 140 | Independent | 3 | Latha Mallikarjun; K. H. Puttaswamy Gowda; S. T. Somashekhar |
| Opposition; NDA; Seats: 81 | Bharatiya Janata Party | 63 | R. Ashoka |
| Opposition; NDA; Seats: 81 | Janata Dal (Secular) | 18 | C. B. Suresh Babu |
| Others; Seats: 1 | Independent | 1 | Basangouda Patil Yatnal |
| Vacant; Seats: 2 | Dharwad; Hiriyur | 2 | —N/a |
| Total | | 224 | |

== Members of Legislative Assembly ==
| District | No. | Constituency | Name | Party | Remarks |
|---|---|---|---|---|---|
| Belagavi | 1 | Nippani | Shashikala Jolle | BJP | |
| Belagavi | 2 | Chikkodi-Sadalga | Ganesh Hukkeri | INC | |
| Belagavi | 3 | Athani | Laxman Savadi | INC | |
| Belagavi | 4 | Kagwad | Raju Kage | INC | |
| Belagavi | 5 | Kudachi (SC) | Mahendra Kallappa Tammannavar | INC | |
| Belagavi | 6 | Raibag (SC) | Duryodhan Aihole | BJP | |
| Belagavi | 7 | Hukkeri | Nikhil Katti | BJP | |
| Belagavi | 8 | Arabhavi | Balachandra Jarkiholi | BJP | |
| Belagavi | 9 | Gokak | Ramesh Jarkiholi | BJP | |
| Belagavi | 10 | Yemkanmardi (ST) | Satish Jarkiholi | INC | Cabinet Minister (Shivakumar ministry) |
| Belagavi | 11 | Belgaum Uttar | Asif Sait | INC | |
| Belagavi | 12 | Belgaum Dakshin | Abhay Patil | BJP | |
| Belagavi | 13 | Belgaum Rural | Lakshmi Hebbalkar | INC | Cabinet Minister (Second Siddaramaiah ministry) |
| Belagavi | 14 | Khanapur | Vithal Halagekar | BJP | |
| Belagavi | 15 | Kittur | Babasaheb Devanagouda Patil | INC | |
| Belagavi | 16 | Bailhongal | Mahantesh Koujalagi | INC | |
| Belagavi | 17 | Saundatti Yellamma | Vishwas Vasant Vaidya | INC | |
| Belagavi | 18 | Ramdurg | Ashok Pattan | INC | |
| Bagalkot | 19 | Mudhol (SC) | R. B. Timmapur | INC | |
| Bagalkot | 20 | Terdal | Siddu Savadi | BJP | |
| Bagalkot | 21 | Jamkhandi | Jagadish Gudagunti | BJP | |
| Bagalkot | 22 | Bilgi | J. T. Patil | INC | |
| Bagalkot | 23 | Badami | Bhimsen Chimmanakatti | INC | |
| Bagalkot | 24 | Bagalkot | H. Y. Meti | INC | Died on 4 November 2025 |
| Bagalkot | 24 | Bagalkot | U.H. Meti | INC | Elected in bypoll |
| Bagalkot | 25 | Hungund | Vijayanand Kashappanavar | INC | |
| Vijayapura | 26 | Muddebihal | C. S. Nadagouda | INC | |
| Vijayapura | 27 | Devar Hippargi | Rajugouda Patil | JD(S) | |
| Vijayapura | 28 | Basavana Bagevadi | Shivanand Patil | INC | |
| Vijayapura | 29 | Babaleshwar | M. B. Patil | INC | Cabinet Minister (Shivakumar ministry) |
| Vijayapura | 30 | Bijapur City | Basangouda Patil Yatnal | IND | Expelled from BJP on 26 March 2025 |
| Vijayapura | 31 | Nagathan (SC) | Katakadond Vittal Dondiba | INC | |
| Vijayapura | 32 | Indi | Yashavant Rayagoud Patil | INC | |
| Vijayapura | 33 | Sindagi | Ashok M. Managuli | INC | |
| Kalaburagi | 34 | Afzalpur | M. Y. Patil | INC | |
| Kalaburagi | 35 | Jevargi | Ajay Singh | INC | |
| Yadgir | 36 | Shorapur (ST) | Raja Venkatappa Naik | INC | Died on 25 February 2024 |
| Yadgir | 36 | Shorapur (ST) | Raja Venugopal Naik | INC | Elected on 4 June 2024 |
| Yadgir | 37 | Shahapur | Sharanabasappa Darshanapur | INC | |
| Yadgir | 38 | Yadgir | Channareddy Patil Tunnur | INC | |
| Yadgir | 39 | Gurmitkal | Sharanagouda Kandakur | JD(S) | |
| Kalaburagi | 40 | Chittapur (SC) | Priyank Kharge | INC | Cabinet Minister (Shivakumar ministry) |
| Kalaburagi | 41 | Sedam | Sharan Prakash Patil | INC | Cabinet Minister (Shivakumar ministry) |
| Kalaburagi | 42 | Chincholi (SC) | Avinash Jadhav | BJP | |
| Kalaburagi | 43 | Gulbarga Rural (SC) | Basawaraj Mattimud | BJP | |
| Kalaburagi | 44 | Gulbarga Dakshin | Allamprabhu Patil | INC | |
| Kalaburagi | 45 | Gulbarga Uttar | Kaneez Fathima | INC | |
| Kalaburagi | 46 | Aland | B. R. Patil | INC | |
| Bidar | 47 | Basavakalyan | Sharanu Salagar | BJP | |
| Bidar | 48 | Humnabad | Siddu Patil | BJP | |
| Bidar | 49 | Bidar South | Shailendra Bedale | BJP | |
| Bidar | 50 | Bidar | Rahim Khan | INC | |
| Bidar | 51 | Bhalki | Eshwara Khandre | INC | Cabinet Minister (Shivakumar ministry) |
| Bidar | 52 | Aurad (SC) | Prabhu Chauhan | BJP | |
| Raichur | 53 | Raichur Rural (ST) | Basanagouda Daddal | INC | |
| Raichur | 54 | Raichur | Dr Shivaraj Patil | BJP | |
| Raichur | 55 | Manvi (ST) | G. Hampayya Nayak | INC | |
| Raichur | 56 | Devadurga (ST) | Karemma | JD(S) | |
| Raichur | 57 | Lingsugur (SC) | Manappa D. Vajjal | BJP | |
| Raichur | 58 | Sindhanur | Hampanagouda Badarli | INC | |
| Raichur | 59 | Maski (ST) | Basanagouda Turvihal | INC | |
| Koppal | 60 | Kushtagi | Doddanagouda Hanamagouda Patil | BJP | |
| Koppal | 61 | Kanakagiri (SC) | Tangadagi Shivaraj Sangappa | INC | |
| Koppal | 62 | Gangawati | G. Janardhana Reddy | BJP | KRPP merges with BJP |
| Koppal | 63 | Yelburga | Basavaraj Rayareddy | INC | |
| Koppal | 64 | Koppal | K. Raghavendra Hitnal | INC | |
| Gadag | 65 | Shirahatti (SC) | Chandru Lamani | BJP | |
| Gadag | 66 | Gadag | H. K. Patil | INC | |
| Gadag | 67 | Ron | Gurupadagouda Sanganagouda Patil | INC | |
| Gadag | 68 | Nargund | C. C. Patil | BJP | |
| Dharwad | 69 | Navalgund | Ningaraddi Hanamaraddi Konaraddi | INC | |
| Dharwad | 70 | Kundgol | M. R. Patil | BJP | |
| Dharwad | 71 | Dharwad | Vinay Kulkarni | INC | |
| Dharwad | 72 | Hubli-Dharwad East (SC) | Abbayya Prasad | INC | |
| Dharwad | 73 | Hubli-Dharwad Central | Mahesh Tenginakai | BJP | |
| Dharwad | 74 | Hubli-Dharwad West | Arvind Bellad | BJP | Deputy Leader of the Opposition |
| Dharwad | 75 | Kalghatgi | Santosh Lad | INC | |
| Uttara Kannada | 76 | Haliyal | R. V. Deshpande | INC | |
| Uttara Kannada | 77 | Karwar | Satish Krishna Sail | INC | |
| Uttara Kannada | 78 | Kumta | Dinakar Keshav Shetty | BJP | |
| Uttara Kannada | 79 | Bhatkal | Mankala Vaidya | INC | |
| Uttara Kannada | 80 | Sirsi | Bhimanna T. Naik | INC | |
| Uttara Kannada | 81 | Yellapur | Arbail Hebbar Shivaram | IND | Expelled from Bharatiya Janata Party |
| Haveri | 82 | Hangal | Srinivas Mane | INC | |
| Haveri | 83 | Shiggaon | Basavaraj Bommai | BJP | Elected to Lok Sabha on 4 June 2024 |
| Haveri | 83 | Shiggaon | Pathan Yasir Ahmed Khan | INC | Elected on 23 November 2024 |
| Haveri | 84 | Haveri (SC) | Rudrappa Manappa Lamani | INC | Deputy Speaker |
| Haveri | 85 | Byadgi | Basavaraj Neelappa Shivannanavar | INC | |
| Haveri | 86 | Hirekerur | U. B. Banakar | INC | |
| Haveri | 87 | Ranebennur | Prakash Koliwad | INC | |
| Vijayanagara | 88 | Hoovina Hadagali (SC) | Krishna Nayaka | BJP | |
| Vijayanagara | 89 | Hagaribommanahalli (SC) | K. Nemaraja Naik | JD(S) | |
| Vijayanagara | 90 | Vijayanagara | H. R. Gaviyappa | INC | |
| Ballari | 91 | Kampli (ST) | J. N. Ganesh | INC | |
| Ballari | 92 | Siruguppa (ST) | B. M. Nagaraja | INC | |
| Ballari | 93 | Bellary (ST) | B Nagendra | INC | Cabinet Minister (Second Siddaramaiah ministry) |
| Ballari | 94 | Bellary City | Nara Bharath Reddy | INC | |
| Ballari | 95 | Sandur (ST) | E. Tukaram | INC | Elected to Lok Sabha on 4 June 2024 |
| Ballari | 95 | Sandur (ST) | E. Annapoorna | INC | Elected on 23 November 2024 |
| Vijayanagara | 96 | Kudligi (ST) | N. T. Srinivas | INC | |
| Chitradurga | 97 | Molakalmuru (ST) | N. Y. Gopalakrishna | INC | |
| Chitradurga | 98 | Challakere (ST) | T. Raghumurthy | INC | |
| Chitradurga | 99 | Chitradurga | K. C. Veerendra Puppy | INC | |
| Chitradurga | 100 | Hiriyur | D. Sudhakar | INC | Died on 10 May 2026 |
| Chitradurga | 100 | Hiriyur | Vacant | | |
| Chitradurga | 101 | Hosadurga | B. G. Govindappa | INC | |
| Chitradurga | 102 | Holalkere (SC) | M. Chandrappa | BJP | |
| Davanagere | 103 | Jagalur (ST) | B. Devendrappa | INC | |
| Vijayanagara | 104 | Harapanahalli | Latha Mallikarjun | IND | Joined Congress |
| Davanagere | 105 | Harihar | B. P. Harish | BJP | |
| Davanagere | 106 | Davanagere North | S. S. Mallikarjun | INC | |
| Davanagere | 107 | Davanagere South | Shamanur Shivashankarappa | INC | Died on 14 December 2025 |
| Davanagere | 107 | Davanagere South | Samarth Shamanur Mallikarjun | INC | Elected in bypoll |
| Davanagere | 108 | Mayakonda (SC) | K. S. Basavanthappa | INC | |
| Davanagere | 109 | Channagiri | Basavaraju V. Shivaganga | INC | |
| Davanagere | 110 | Honnali | A. D. G. Shanthana Gowda | INC | |
| Shimoga | 111 | Shimoga Rural (SC) | Sharada Puryanaik | JD(S) | |
| Shimoga | 112 | Bhadravati | B. K. Sangameshwara | INC | |
| Shimoga | 113 | Shimoga | Channabasappa | BJP | |
| Shimoga | 114 | Tirthahalli | Araga Jnanendra | BJP | |
| Shimoga | 115 | Shikaripura | B. Y. Vijayendra | BJP | |
| Shimoga | 116 | Sorab | Madhu Bangarappa | INC | |
| Shimoga | 117 | Sagar | Gopala Krishna Beluru | INC | |
| Udupi | 118 | Byndoor | Gururaj Shetty Gantihole | BJP | |
| Udupi | 119 | Kundapura | A. Kiran Kumar Kodgi | BJP | |
| Udupi | 120 | Udupi | Yashpal A. Suvarna | BJP | |
| Udupi | 121 | Kapu | Gurme Suresh Shetty | BJP | |
| Udupi | 122 | Karkala | V. Sunil Kumar | BJP | |
| Chikmagalur | 123 | Sringeri | T. D. Rajegowda | INC | |
| Chikmagalur | 124 | Mudigere (SC) | Nayana Motamma | INC | |
| Chikmagalur | 125 | Chikmagalur | H. D. Thammaiah | INC | |
| Chikmagalur | 126 | Tarikere | G. H. Srinivasa | INC | |
| Chikmagalur | 127 | Kadur | K. S. Anand | INC | |
| Tumakuru | 128 | Chiknayakanhalli | C. B. Suresh Babu | JD(S) | |
| Tumakuru | 129 | Tiptur | K. Shadakshari | INC | |
| Tumakuru | 130 | Turuvekere | M. T. Krishnappa | JD(S) | |
| Tumakuru | 131 | Kunigal | H. D. Ranganath | INC | |
| Tumakuru | 132 | Tumkur City | G. B. Jyothi Ganesh | BJP | |
| Tumakuru | 133 | Tumkur Rural | B. Suresh Gowda | BJP | |
| Tumakuru | 134 | Koratagere (SC) | G. Parameshwara | INC | Deputy Chief Minister |
| Tumakuru | 135 | Gubbi | S. R. Srinivas | INC | |
| Tumakuru | 136 | Sira | T. B. Jayachandra | INC | |
| Tumakuru | 137 | Pavagada (SC) | H. V. Venkatesh | INC | |
| Tumakuru | 138 | Madhugiri | K. N. Rajanna | INC | |
| Chikkaballapura | 139 | Gauribidanur | K. Puttaswamy Gowda | IND | |
| Chikkaballapura | 140 | Bagepalli | S. N. Subbareddy | INC | |
| Chikkaballapura | 141 | Chikkaballapur | Pradeep Eshwar | INC | |
| Chikkaballapura | 142 | Sidlaghatta | B. N. Ravi Kumar | JD(S) | |
| Chikkaballapura | 143 | Chintamani | M. C. Sudhakar | INC | Cabinet Minister (Second Siddaramaiah ministry) |
| Kolar | 144 | Srinivaspur | G. K. Venkatashiva Reddy | JD(S) | |
| Kolar | 145 | Mulbagal (SC) | Samruddhi V. Manjunath | JD(S) | |
| Kolar | 146 | Kolar Gold Field (SC) | M. Roopakala | INC | |
| Kolar | 147 | Bangarapet (SC) | S. N. Narayanaswamy | INC | |
| Kolar | 148 | Kolar | Kothur G. Manjunath | INC | |
| Kolar | 149 | Malur | K. Y. Nanjegowda | INC | |
| Bangalore Urban | 150 | Yelahanka | S. R. Vishwanath | BJP | |
| Bangalore Urban | 151 | Krishnarajapuram | B.A. Basavaraja | BJP | |
| Bangalore Urban | 152 | Byatarayanapura | Krishna Byregowda | INC | Cabinet Minister (Shivakumar ministry) |
| Bangalore Urban | 153 | Yeshwantpur | S.T. Somashekar | IND | Expelled from Bharatiya Janata Party |
| Bangalore Urban | 154 | Rajarajeshwarinagar | Munirathna | BJP | |
| Bangalore Urban | 155 | Dasarahalli | S. Muniraju | BJP | |
| Bangalore Urban | 156 | Mahalakshmi Layout | K. Gopalaiah | BJP | |
| Bangalore Urban | 157 | Malleshwaram | C.N. Ashwath Narayan | BJP | |
| Bangalore Urban | 158 | Hebbal | Suresha B.S. | INC | Cabinet Minister (Shivakumar ministry) |
| Bangalore Urban | 159 | Pulakeshinagar (SC) | A.C. Srinivasa | INC | |
| Bangalore Urban | 160 | Sarvagnanagar | K.J. George | INC | Cabinet Minister (Shivakumar ministry) |
| Bangalore Urban | 161 | C. V. Raman Nagar (SC) | S. Raghu | BJP | |
| Bangalore Urban | 162 | Shivajinagar | Rizwan Arshad | INC | |
| Bangalore Urban | 163 | Shanti Nagar | N.A. Haris | INC | |
| Bangalore Urban | 164 | Gandhi Nagar | Dinesh Gundu Rao | INC | |
| Bangalore Urban | 165 | Rajaji Nagar | S. Suresh Kumar | BJP | |
| Bangalore Urban | 166 | Govindraj Nagar | Priya Krishna | INC | |
| Bangalore Urban | 167 | Vijay Nagar | M. Krishnappa | INC | |
| Bangalore Urban | 168 | Chamrajpet | B.Z. Zameer Ahmed Khan | INC | Cabinet Minister (Second Siddaramaiah ministry) |
| Bangalore Urban | 169 | Chickpet | Uday B. Garudachar | BJP | |
| Bangalore Urban | 170 | Basavanagudi | Ravi Subramanya L.A. | BJP | |
| Bangalore Urban | 171 | Padmanabhanagar | R. Ashoka | BJP | Leader of the Opposition |
| Bangalore Urban | 172 | B.T.M. Layout | Ramalinga Reddy | INC | Cabinet Minister (Shivakumar ministry) |
| Bangalore Urban | 173 | Jayanagar | C. K. Ramamurthy | BJP | |
| Bangalore Urban | 174 | Mahadevapura (SC) | Manjula S. | BJP | |
| Bangalore Urban | 175 | Bommanahalli | Satish Reddy M. | BJP | |
| Bangalore Urban | 176 | Bangalore South | M. Krishnappa | BJP | |
| Bangalore Urban | 177 | Anekal (SC) | B. Shivanna | INC | |
| Bangalore Rural | 178 | Hoskote | Sharath Kumar Bache Gowda | INC | |
| Bangalore Rural | 179 | Devanahalli (SC) | K. H. Muniyappa | INC | Cabinet Minister (Shivakumar ministry) |
| Bangalore Rural | 180 | Doddaballapur | Dheeraj Muniraj | BJP | |
| Bangalore Rural | 181 | Nelamangala (SC) | N. Shreenivasaiah | INC | |
| Ramanagara | 182 | Magadi | H. C. Balakrishna | INC | |
| Ramanagara | 183 | Ramanagara | H. A. Iqbal Hussain | INC | |
| Ramanagara | 184 | Kanakapura | D.K. Shivakumar | INC | Chief Minister |
| Ramanagara | 185 | Channapatna | H. D. Kumaraswamy | JD(S) | Elected to Lok Sabha on 4 June 2024 |
| Ramanagara | 185 | Channapatna | C. P. Yogeshwar | INC | Elected on 23 November 2024 |
| Mandya | 186 | Malavalli (SC) | P. M. Narendraswamy | INC | |
| Mandya | 187 | Maddur | K. M. Udaya | INC | |
| Mandya | 188 | Melukote | Darshan Puttannaiah | SKP | |
| Mandya | 189 | Mandya | Ravikumar Gowda | INC | |
| Mandya | 190 | Shrirangapattana | A. B. Ramesha Bandisiddegowda | INC | |
| Mandya | 191 | Nagamangala | N. Chaluvaraya Swamy | INC | |
| Mandya | 192 | Krishnarajapet | H. T. Manju | JD(S) | |
| Hassan | 193 | Shravanabelagola | C. N. Balakrishna | JD(S) | |
| Hassan | 194 | Arsikere | K. M. Shivalinge Gowda | INC | |
| Hassan | 195 | Belur | H. K. Suresh | BJP | |
| Hassan | 196 | Hassan | Swaroop Prakash | JD(S) | |
| Hassan | 197 | Holenarasipur | H. D. Revanna | JD(S) | |
| Hassan | 198 | Arkalgud | A. Manju | JD(S) | |
| Hassan | 199 | Sakleshpur (SC) | Cement Manju | BJP | |
| Dakshina Kannada | 200 | Belthangady | Harish Poonja | BJP | |
| Dakshina Kannada | 201 | Moodabidri | Umanatha Kotian | BJP | |
| Dakshina Kannada | 202 | Mangalore City North | Y. Bharath Shetty | BJP | |
| Dakshina Kannada | 203 | Mangalore City South | D. Vedavyasa Kamath | BJP | |
| Dakshina Kannada | 204 | Mangalore | U. T. Khader | INC | Former Speaker; Cabinet Minister (Shivakumar ministry) |
| Dakshina Kannada | 205 | Bantval | U. Rajesh Naik | BJP | |
| Dakshina Kannada | 206 | Puttur | Ashok Kumar Rai | INC | |
| Dakshina Kannada | 207 | Sullia (SC) | Bhagirathi Murulya | BJP | |
| Kodagu | 208 | Madikeri | Mantar Gowda | INC | |
| Kodagu | 209 | Virajpet | A. S. Ponnanna | INC | |
| Mysore | 210 | Periyapatna | K. Venkatesh | INC | |
| Mysore | 211 | Krishnarajanagara | D. Ravishankar | INC | |
| Mysore | 212 | Hunsur | G. D. Harish Gowda | JD(S) | |
| Mysore | 213 | Heggadadevankote (ST) | Anil Chikkamadhu | INC | |
| Mysore | 214 | Nanjangud (SC) | Darshan Dhruvanarayana | INC | |
| Mysore | 215 | Chamundeshwari | G. T. Devegowda | JD(S) | |
| Mysore | 216 | Krishnaraja | T. S. Srivatsa | BJP | |
| Mysore | 217 | Chamaraja | K. Harish Gowda | INC | |
| Mysore | 218 | Narasimharaja | Tanveer Sait | INC | |
| Mysore | 219 | Varuna | Siddaramaiah | INC | Former Chief Minister (2023–2026) |
| Mysore | 220 | T. Narasipur (SC) | H. C. Mahadevappa | INC | |
| Chamarajanagar | 221 | Hanur | M. R. Manjunath | JD(S) | |
| Chamarajanagar | 222 | Kollegal (SC) | A. R. Krishnamurthy | INC | |
| Chamarajanagar | 223 | Chamarajanagar | C. Puttarangashetty | INC | |
| Chamarajanagar | 224 | Gundlupet | H M Ganesh Prasad | INC | |
