= Mandya Lok Sabha constituency =

Constituency of the Indian parliament in Karnataka

Coordinates: 12.5°N 76.9°E

Mandya
- Lok Sabha constituency
- Mandya Lok Sabha Constituency Map

Constituency details
- Country: India
- Region: South India
- State: Karnataka
- Assembly constituencies: Malavalli; Maddur; Melukote; Mandya; Shrirangapattana; Nagamangala; Krishnarajpete; Krishnarajanagara
- Established: 1952
- Reservation: None

Member of Parliament
- 18th Lok Sabha
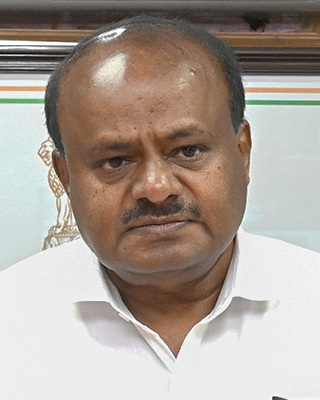
- Incumbent H. D. Kumaraswamy; Union Minister of Heavy Industries & Steel
- Party: JD(S)
- Alliance: NDA
- Elected year: 2024
- Preceded by: Sumalatha

Mandya Lok Sabha constituency is one of the 28 Lok Sabha (parliamentary) constituencies in Karnataka state in southern India.

This constituency covers the entirety of Mandya district ( ಮಂಡ್ಯ ) and part of Mysore district.

== Assembly segments ==
Mandya Lok Sabha constituency presently comprises the following eight Legislative Assembly segments:

No	Name	District	Member	Party	Party Leading (in 2024)
186	Malavalli (SC)	Mandya	P. M. Narendraswamy	INC	JD(S)
187	Maddur	Mandya	K. M. Uday Gowda	INC	JD(S)
188	Melukote	Mandya	Darshan Puttannaiah	SKP	JD(S)
189	Mandya	Mandya	Ganiga Ravikumar Gowda	INC	JD(S)
190	Shrirangapattana	Mandya	Ramesh Bandisiddegowda	INC	JD(S)
191	Nagamangala	Mandya	N. Chaluvaraya Swamy	INC	JD(S)
192	Krishnarajpete	Mandya	H. T. Manju	JD(S)	JD(S)
211	Krishnarajanagara	Mysore	D. Ravishankar	INC	JD(S)

== Members of Lok Sabha ==
Year	Member	Party
1952	M. K. Shivananjappa	Indian National Congress
1957	M. K. Shivananjappa	Indian National Congress
1962	M. K. Shivananjappa	Indian National Congress
1967	M. K. Shivananjappa	Indian National Congress
1968^	S. M. Krishna	Praja Socialist Party
1971	S. M. Krishna	Indian National Congress
1972^	K Chikklingaiah	Indian National Congress
1977	K Chikklingaiah	Indian National Congress
1980	S. M. Krishna	Indian National Congress (I)
1984	K.V. Shankaragowda	Janata Party
1989	G. Made Gowda	Indian National Congress
1991	G. Made Gowda	Indian National Congress
1996	Krishna	Janata Dal
1998	Ambareesh	Janata Dal
1999	Ambareesh	Indian National Congress
2004	Ambareesh	Indian National Congress
2009	N. Chaluvaraya Swamy	Janata Dal (Secular)
2013^	Ramya	Indian National Congress
2014	C. S. Puttaraju	Janata Dal (Secular)
2018^	L. R. Shivarame Gowda	Janata Dal (Secular)
2019	Sumalatha	Independent
2024	H. D. Kumaraswamy	Janata Dal (Secular)

^ by-poll

== Election results ==
Vote share of Winning candidates
2024	58.34%
2019	51.02%
2018 by-poll	64.92%
2014	43.97%
2013 by-poll	51.36%
2009	37.26%
2004	47.94%
1999	52.22%
1998	54.97%
1996	45.97%
1991	42.48%
1989	47.72%
1984	58.55%
1980	52.02%
1977	48.39%
1972 by-poll	49.95%
1971	71.22%
1968 by-poll	59.94%
1967	56.86%
1962	51.09%
1957	61.38%
1952	59.23%

=== 2024 ===
2024 Indian general election: Mandya
Party	Candidate	Votes	%	±%
JD(S)	H. D. Kumaraswamy	851,881	58.34	
INC	Venkataramane Gowda	567,261	38.85	
NOTA	None of the above	7,736	0.53	
IND	7 Independent Candidates	21,826	1.49	
OTH	5 Other Party Candidates	11,563	0.79	
Majority		284,620	19.49	
Turnout		1,460,563	82.05	
Swing to JD(S) from Independent		Swing		

=== 2019 ===
2019 Indian general election: Mandya
Party	Candidate	Votes	%	±%
IND	Sumalatha Ambareesh (Note: Contested as Independent with support of BJP-led NDA)	703,660	51.02	
JD(S)	Nikhil Kumaraswamy	577,784	41.89	
NOTA	None of the above	3,526	0.26	
IND	15 Independent Candidates	65,535	4.75	
OTH	5 Other Party Candidates	28,705	2.08	
Majority		125,876	9.13	
Turnout		1,379,622	80.59	
Swing to Independent from JD(S)		Swing		

=== 2018 by-election ===
2018 by-election: Mandya
Party	Candidate	Votes	%	±%
JD(S)	L. R. Shivarame Gowda	569,347	64.92	
BJP	D. R. Siddaramaiah	244,404	27.87	
IND	M. Honnegonda	17,842	2.03	
IND	G. B. Naveen Kumar	15,307	1.75	
IND	Kowdle Channappa	9,094	1.04	
IND	K. S. Ranjana	7,421	0.85	
IND	Shambolinge Gowda	5,483	0.63	
IND	B. S. Gonda	4,086	0.47	
IND	Nandish	4,064	0.46	
Majority		324,943	37.05	
Turnout		892,560	52.97	
JD(S) hold		Swing		

=== 2014 ===
2014 Indian general election: Mandya
Party	Candidate	Votes	%	±%
JD(S)	C. S. Puttaraju	524,370	43.97	
INC	Ramya	518,852	43.50	
BJP	Prof. B. Shivalingaiah	86,993	7.29	
BSP	M. Krishnamurthy	22,391	1.88	
IND	6 Independent Candidates	15,959	1.34	
OTH	6 Other Party Candidates	18,052	1.51	
NOTA	None of the Above	6,021	0.50	
Majority		5,518	0.47	
Turnout		1,193,041	71.47	
Swing to JD(S) from INC		Swing		

=== 2013 by-election ===
Bye-election, 2013: Mandya
Party	Candidate	Votes	%	±%
INC	Ramya	484,085	51.36	▲16.37
JD(S)	C. S. Puttaraju	4,16,474	44.19	▲6.93
IND	Arun Kumara	10,115	1.07	N/A
RPI(A)	Krishna Murthy	9,076	0.96	N/A
IND	V. Suresh	7,973	0.85	N/A
Margin of victory		67,611	7.17	▲4.9
Turnout		9,42,453	58.24	▼10.59
INC gain from JD(S)		Swing		

=== 2009 ===
2009 Indian general election: Mandya
Party	Candidate	Votes	%	±%
JD(S)	N. Chaluvaraya Swamy	384,443	37.26	
INC	M. H. Ambareesh	360,943	34.99	
BJP	L. R. Shivarame Gowda	144,875	14.04	
SKP	K. S. Puttannaiah	53,644	5.20	
BSP	M. Krishnamurthy	25,441	2.47	
IND	4 Independent Candidates	49,310	4.78	
OTH	3 Other Party Candidates	13,047	1.26	
Majority		23,500	2.27	
Turnout		1,032,227	68.83	
Swing to JD(S) from INC		Swing		

=== 2004 ===
2004 Indian general election: Mandya
Party	Candidate	Votes	%	±%
INC	M. H. Ambareesh	411,116	47.94	
JD(S)	Dr. S. Ramegowda	286,678	33.43	
JD(U)	Dr. K. S. Jayaram	98,260	11.46	
KNDP	B. T. Srinivasagowda	33,014	3.85	
BSP	C. Ravikeerti	28,496	3.32	
Majority		124,438	14.51	
Turnout		857,564		
INC hold		Swing		

=== 1999 ===
1999 Indian general election: Mandya
Party	Candidate	Votes	%	±%
INC	M. H. Ambareesh	418,110	52.22	
JD(S)	Krishna	265,930	33.22	
BJP	D. Ramalingaiah	82,522	10.31	
BSP	N. Mahesh	21,562	2.69	
IND	C. M. Dyavappa	12,470	1.56	
Majority		152,180	19.00	
Turnout		832,028	75.66	
Swing to INC from JD		Swing		

=== 1998 ===
1998 Indian general election: Mandya
Party	Candidate	Votes	%	±%
JD	Ambareesh	431,439	54.97	
INC	G. Made Gowda	250,916	31.97	
BJP	H. Srinivas	102,459	13.06	
Majority		180,523	23.00	
Turnout		794,821	74.48	
JD hold		Swing		

=== 1996 ===
1996 Indian general election: Mandya
Party	Candidate	Votes	%	±%
JD	Krishna	335,852	45.97	
INC	G. Madegowda	302,466	41.40	
BJP	D. Ramalingaiah	70,823	9.69	
JP	D. C. Chowdegowda	9,687	1.33	
IND	K. Rao	3,695	0.51	
IND	Kullegowda	2,545	0.35	
IND	Ramachandra	1,743	0.24	
IND	Ameer Baig	1,544	0.21	
IND	Honnagirigowda	798	0.11	
IND	C. Basavarajappa	768	0.11	
IND	P. Venkataramaiah	704	0.10	
Majority		33,386	4.57	
Turnout		745,896	71.70	
Swing to JD from INC		Swing		

=== 1991 ===
1991 Indian general election: Mandya
Party	Candidate	Votes	%	±%
INC	G. Madegowda	259,500	42.48	
BJP	D. Ramalingaiah	164,153	26.87	
KRRS	H. Srinivas	117,136	19.17	
JD	H. T. Krishnappa	52,331	8.57	
IND	Puttagowda	4,872	0.80	
IND	Srinivas	4,390	0.72	
IND	N. C. Prasanna Kumara	3,358	0.55	
IND	Manavar Sherief	2,874	0.47	
BKUS (Note: Bharatiya Krishi Udyog Sangh)	V. Krishnashetty	2,294	0.38	
Majority		95,347	15.61	
Turnout		623,832	64.29	
INC hold		Swing		

=== 1989 ===
1989 Indian general election: Mandya
Party	Candidate	Votes	%	±%
INC	G. Made Gowda	337,024	47.72	
JP	H. L. Nage Gowda	262,135	37.12	
JD	Kowdley Channappa	74,548	10.56	
IND	V. Krishna Shetty	14,810	2.10	
IND	Devegowda	5,946	0.84	
IND	V. Sundrakrishna	5,083	0.72	
IND	N. C. Prasanna Kumar	3,635	0.51	
IND	C. N. Margigowda	3,007	0.43	
Majority		74,889	10.60	
Turnout		733,580	76.22	
Swing to INC from JP		Swing		

=== 1984 ===
1984 Indian general election: Mandya
Party	Candidate	Votes	%	±%
JP	K. V. Shankaragowda	319,176	58.55	
INC	S. M. Krishna	198,780	36.47	
IND	B. N. Thirumalegowda	7,240	1.33	
IND	S. B. Shivalingegowda	3,833	0.70	
IND	S. S. Khothari	3,659	0.67	
IND	K. Jogaiah	3,267	0.60	
IND	M. M. Manjunath	2,786	0.51	
IND	V. Sundarakrishna	2,638	0.48	
IND	C. Boraiah	1,923	0.35	
IND	Yellappa	1,807	0.33	
Majority		120,396	22.08	
Turnout		557,529	77.13	
Swing to JP from INC(I)		Swing		

=== 1980 ===
1980 Indian general election: Mandya
Party	Candidate	Votes	%	±%
INC(I)	S. M. Krishna	223,675	52.02	
JP	C. Bandegowda	108,333	25.20	
INC(U)	M. Lingaiah	86,245	20.06	
IND	M. S. Siddappa	5,155	1.20	
IND	Guruswamy	3,886	0.90	
IND	R. Siddaiah	1,353	0.31	
IND	Hette Paksha Rangaswamy	1,330	0.31	
Majority		115,342	26.82	
Turnout		442,519	66.11	
Swing to INC(I) from INC		Swing		

=== 1977 ===
1977 Indian general election: Mandya
Party	Candidate	Votes	%	±%
INC	K. Chickalingaiah	200,360	48.39	
JP	M. Srinivas	195,039	47.11	
IND	G. Rangaswamy	16,009	3.87	
IND	Kowdle Channappa	2,631	0.64	
Majority		5,321	1.28	
Turnout		425,086	70.33	
INC hold		Swing		

=== 1972 by-election ===
1972 by-election: Mandya
Party	Candidate	Votes	%	±%
INC	K. Chikkalingaiah	123,405	49.95	
INC(O)	M. Srinivas	103,293	41.81	
IND	G. Rangaswamy	14,832	6.00	
IND	M. S. Sinddappa	5,923	2.40	
Majority		20,112	8.14	
Turnout				
INC hold		Swing		

=== 1971 ===
1971 Indian general election: Mandya
Party	Candidate	Votes	%	±%
INC	S. M. Krishna	272,174	71.22	
INC(O)	M. D. Chowdaiah	110,012	28.78	
Majority		162,162	42.44	
Turnout		392,751	71.42	
INC hold		Swing		

=== 1968 by-election ===
1968 by-election: Mandya
Party	Candidate	Votes	%	±%
PSP	S. M. Krishna	184,054	59.94	
INC	H. D. Chowdiah	120,101	39.09	
IND	G. Rangaswamy	3,394	1.10	
Majority		63,953	20.85	
Turnout				
Swing to PSP from INC		Swing		

=== 1967 ===
1967 Indian general election: Mandya
Party	Candidate	Votes	%	±%
INC	M. K. Shivananjappa	192,706	56.86	
IND	J. Devaiah	146,222	43.14	
Majority		46,484	13.72	
Turnout		355,772	70.66	
INC hold		Swing		

=== 1962 ===
1962 Indian general election: Mandya
Party	Candidate	Votes	%	±%
INC	M. K. Shivananjappa	148,523	51.09	
IND	M. C. Linge Gowda	74,200	25.52	
IND	H. Veerannagowda	33,674	11.58	
IND	M. S. Siddappa	25,967	8.93	
IND	N. Kempanna	8,361	2.88	
Majority		74,323	25.57	
Turnout		306,657	67.78	
INC hold		Swing		

=== 1957 ===
1957 Indian general election: Mandya
Party	Candidate	Votes	%	±%
INC	M. K. Shivananjappa	142,066	61.38	
PSP	M. C. Linge Gowda	89,395	38.62	
Majority		52,671	22.76	
Turnout		231,461	59.77	
INC hold		Swing		

=== 1952 ===
1952 Indian general election: Mandya
Party	Candidate	Votes	%	±%
INC	M. K. Sivananjappa	125,566	59.23	
KMPP	M. C. Lingegowda	86,449	40.77	
Majority		39,117	18.46	
Turnout		212,015	58.82	
INC win (new seat)				

== See also ==
- Mandya district
- List of constituencies of the Lok Sabha
