= Pandavapura Assembly constituency =

Former Assembly constituency in Karnataka, India

Coordinates: 12.828261°N 77.033901°E

Pandavapura
- Former constituency for the Karnataka Legislative Assembly

Constituency details
- Country: India
- Region: South India
- State: Karnataka
- Division: Mysore
- District: Mandya
- Lok Sabha constituency: Mandya
- Established: 1951
- Abolished: 2008
- Reservation: None

Pandavapura Assembly constituency was one of the constituencies in Karnataka state assembly in India until 2008 when it was made defunct. It was part of Mandya Lok Sabha constituency.

== Members of the Legislative Assembly ==
Election	Member	Party
1952	B. Y. Neelegowda	Indian National Congress
1957	B. Chamaiah	Praja Socialist Party
1962	B. Y. Neelegowda	Indian National Congress
1967	N. A. Channegowda	Independent politician
1972	D. Halagegowda	Indian National Congress
1978	K. Rajagopal	Janata Party
1983	K. Kempegowda	Janata Party
1985	K. Kempegowda	Independent politician
1989	D. Halagegowda	Indian National Congress
1994	K. S. Puttannaiah	Karnataka Rajya Raitha Sangha
1999	K. Kempegowda	Indian National Congress
2004	C. S. Puttaraju	Janata Dal

== Election results ==
=== Assembly Election 2004 ===
2004 Karnataka Legislative Assembly election : Pandavapura
Party	Candidate	Votes	%	±%
JD(S)	C. S. Puttaraju	44,165	36.61%	▲12.53
Independent	K. S. Puttannaiah	42,649	35.36%	New
INC	Ravi. L. D	20,392	16.90%	▼21.40
BJP	Manjunatha. H. N	4,774	3.96%	▼2.59
BSP	Parvathi. H	4,199	3.48%	New
JP	Krishnappa. L. D	3,273	2.71%	New
Kannada Nadu Party	Sundahalli Somashekahara	1,178	0.98%	New
Margin of victory		1,516	1.26%	▼5.96
Turnout		120,743	74.67%	▼2.75
Total valid votes		120,630		
Registered electors		161,699		▲8.93
JD(S) gain from INC		Swing	▼1.69	

=== Assembly Election 1999 ===
1999 Karnataka Legislative Assembly election : Pandavapura
Party	Candidate	Votes	%	±%
INC	K. Kempegowda	41,661	38.30%	▲19.77
KRRS	K. S. Puttaramaih	33,803	31.07%	▼9.64
JD(S)	C. S. Puttaraju	26,192	24.08%	New
BJP	P. Jayadeva	7,130	6.55%	▲4.32
Margin of victory		7,858	7.22%	▼4.60
Turnout		114,928	77.42%	▼2.34
Total valid votes		108,786		
Rejected ballots		6,104	5.31%	▲3.56
Registered electors		148,448		▲9.30
INC gain from KRRS		Swing	▼2.41	

=== Assembly Election 1994 ===
1994 Karnataka Legislative Assembly election : Pandavapura
Party	Candidate	Votes	%	±%
KRRS	K. S. Puttannaiah	43,323	40.71%	New
Independent	K. Kempegowda	30,739	28.88%	New
INC	D. Halagegowda	19,720	18.53%	▼14.39
INC	C. Nagabhushan	4,567	4.29%	New
SP	K. Nanjegowda	2,916	2.74%	New
BJP	K. Venkataramanegowda @ Thammanna	2,371	2.23%	▲1.72
BSP	B. Praksh	1,057	0.99%	New
Independent	M. V. Krishnappa	817	0.77%	New
Margin of victory		12,584	11.82%	▲8.15
Turnout		108,331	79.76%	▼0.63
Total valid votes		106,419		
Rejected ballots		1,895	1.75%	▼3.90
Registered electors		135,814		▲11.14
KRRS gain from INC		Swing	▲7.79	

=== Assembly Election 1989 ===
1989 Karnataka Legislative Assembly election : Pandavapura
Party	Candidate	Votes	%	±%
INC	D. Halagegowda	30,520	32.92%	▼3.20
Kranti Sabha	K. S. Puttannaiah	27,121	29.26%	New
JP	C. Annegowda	18,176	19.61%	New
JD	K. Kempegowda	16,164	17.44%	New
Margin of victory		3,399	3.67%	▲3.03
Turnout		98,247	80.39%	▲2.50
Total valid votes		92,696		
Rejected ballots		5,551	5.65%	▲4.09
Registered electors		122,206		▲23.98
INC gain from Independent		Swing	▼3.83	

=== Assembly Election 1985 ===
1985 Karnataka Legislative Assembly election : Pandavapura
Party	Candidate	Votes	%	±%
Independent	K. Kempegowda	27,780	36.75%	New
INC	K. M. Kengegowda	27,300	36.12%	▲1.02
JP	C. Annegowda	19,339	25.59%	▼19.96
Independent	C. Boraiah	594	0.79%	New
Margin of victory		480	0.64%	▼9.81
Turnout		76,777	77.89%	▲4.08
Total valid votes		75,583		
Rejected ballots		1,194	1.56%	▼0.55
Registered electors		98,573		▲11.76
Independent gain from JP		Swing	▼8.80	

=== Assembly Election 1983 ===
1983 Karnataka Legislative Assembly election : Pandavapura
Party	Candidate	Votes	%	±%
JP	K. Kempegowda	29,030	45.55%	▲0.39
INC	K. M. Kengegowda	22,371	35.10%	▲16.40
Independent	K. B. Narasimhegowda	10,514	16.50%	New
Independent	K. Jaleelkhan	772	1.21%	New
Independent	S. G. Javaraiah	669	1.05%	New
Margin of victory		6,659	10.45%	▼5.17
Turnout		65,104	73.81%	▼2.11
Total valid votes		63,733		
Rejected ballots		1,371	2.11%	▼0.31
Registered electors		88,199		▲7.93
JP hold		Swing	▲0.39	

=== Assembly Election 1978 ===
1978 Karnataka Legislative Assembly election : Pandavapura
Party	Candidate	Votes	%	±%
JP	K. Rajagopal	27,341	45.16%	New
INC(I)	C. B. Marigowda	17,885	29.54%	New
INC	D. Halagegowda	11,323	18.70%	▼52.19
Independent	B. Boregowda	2,647	4.37%	New
Independent	K. Mayigowda	710	1.17%	New
Independent	K. Nagaraju	632	1.04%	New
Margin of victory		9,456	15.62%	▼26.15
Turnout		62,040	75.92%	▲0.75
Total valid votes		60,538		
Rejected ballots		1,502	2.42%	▲2.42
Registered electors		81,721		▲15.35
JP gain from INC		Swing	▼25.73	

=== Assembly Election 1972 ===
1972 Mysore State Legislative Assembly election : Pandavapura
Party	Candidate	Votes	%	±%
INC	D. Halagegowda	36,900	70.89%	▲29.06
INC(O)	K. M. Kengegowda	15,156	29.11%	New
Margin of victory		21,744	41.77%	▲31.42
Turnout		53,252	75.17%	▲9.35
Total valid votes		52,056		
Registered electors		70,846		▲14.81
INC gain from Independent		Swing	▲18.71	

=== Assembly Election 1967 ===
1967 Mysore State Legislative Assembly election : Pandavapura
Party	Candidate	Votes	%	±%
Independent	N. A. Channegowda	19,460	52.18%	New
INC	D. Halagegowda	15,599	41.83%	▼3.49
Independent	Challakondiah	2,234	5.99%	New
Margin of victory		3,861	10.35%	▲0.68
Turnout		40,619	65.82%	▲4.96
Total valid votes		37,293		
Registered electors		61,709		▲12.35
Independent gain from INC		Swing	▲6.86	

=== Assembly Election 1962 ===
1962 Mysore State Legislative Assembly election : Pandavapura
Party	Candidate	Votes	%	±%
INC	B. Y. Neelegowda	14,089	45.32%	▲14.69
Independent	N. A. Channegowda	11,084	35.65%	New
PSP	D. Halagegowda	5,914	19.02%	▼24.92
Margin of victory		3,005	9.67%	▼3.64
Turnout		33,427	60.86%	▲0.48
Total valid votes		31,087		
Registered electors		54,928		▲14.94
INC gain from PSP		Swing	▲1.38	

=== Assembly Election 1957 ===
1957 Mysore State Legislative Assembly election : Pandavapura
Party	Candidate	Votes	%	±%
PSP	B. Chamaiah	12,677	43.94%	New
INC	Damayanthiyamma	8,837	30.63%	▼4.24
Independent	Doddathimmegowda	7,339	25.44%	New
Margin of victory		3,840	13.31%	▲4.94
Turnout		28,853	60.38%	▲6.51
Total valid votes		28,853		
Registered electors		47,789		▲26.14
PSP gain from INC		Swing	▲9.07	

=== Assembly Election 1952 ===
1952 Mysore State Legislative Assembly election : Pandavapura
Party	Candidate	Votes	%	±%
INC	B. Y. Neelegowda	7,116	34.87%	New
KMPP	B. Chamaiah	5,407	26.49%	New
Independent	N. A. Channegowda	4,264	20.89%	New
Independent	K. M. Lingegowda	3,623	17.75%	New
Margin of victory		1,709	8.37%	
Turnout		20,410	53.87%	
Total valid votes		20,410		
Registered electors		37,885		
INC win (new seat)				

== See also ==
- List of constituencies of the Karnataka Legislative Assembly
