= Next Karnataka Legislative Assembly election =

Elections for the 17th Legislative assembly of Karnataka

- By May 2028

All 224 seats in the Karnataka Legislative Assembly 113 seats needed for a majority
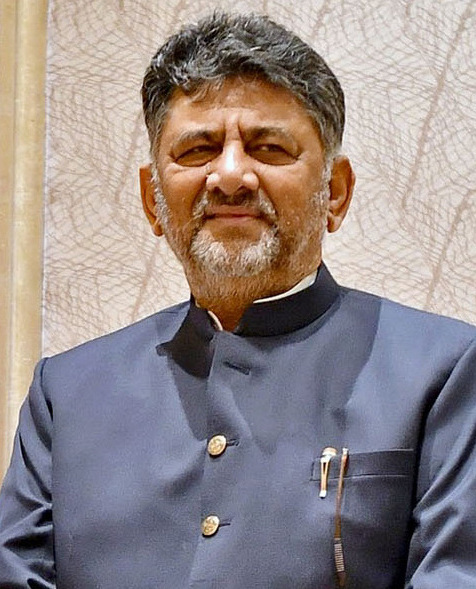

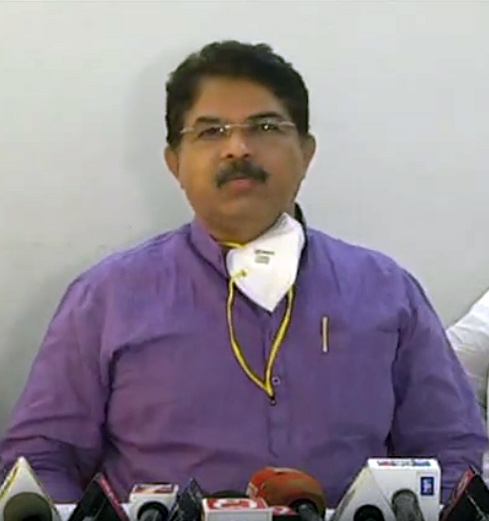

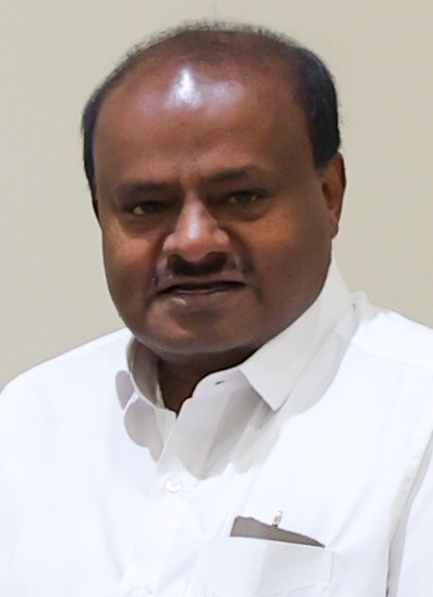
| Leader | D. K. Shivakumar | R. Ashoka | H.D. Kumaraswamy |
| Party | INC | BJP | JD(S) |
| Alliance | INDIA | NDA | NDA |
| Leader since | 2026 | 2023 | 2023 |
| Leader's seat | Kanakapura | Padmanabhanagar | - |
| Last election | 42.88%, 135 seats | 36.00%, 66 seats | 13.29%, 18 seats |
| Current seats | 136 | 62 | 18 |
| Seats needed | Steady | ▲51 | ▲95 |
- Map of the assembly constituencies in Karnataka
Incumbent Chief Minister
D. K. Shivakumar
INC

The Next Karnataka legislative assembly election is expected to be held by May 2028 to elect all 224 members of the Karnataka Legislative Assembly. D. K. Shivakumar is the incumbent chief minister of Karnataka, having been sworn in on 3 June 2026 with G. Parameshwara as his deputy, following the resignation of Siddaramaiah on 28 May 2026.

== Background ==
Following the 2023 Karnataka Assembly election, the Indian National Congress formed a government under Siddaramaiah, with D. K. Shivakumar — the Karnataka Pradesh Congress Committee (KPCC) president who had led the party's campaign — serving as deputy chief minister. An internal power-sharing understanding within the party was widely believed to envisage a leadership rotation partway through the term, under which Shivakumar would eventually be elevated to chief minister, though this was never formally announced.

Speculation over the arrangement intensified from late 2025, as Shivakumar and his supporters pressed for the transition. Siddaramaiah resigned as chief minister on 28 May 2026 following direction from the Congress high command; Governor Thawar Chand Gehlot accepted the resignation the following day. On 30 May 2026, Shivakumar was unanimously elected leader of the Congress Legislature Party at a meeting at Vidhana Soudha, Bengaluru, with Siddaramaiah himself proposing his name. Shivakumar was sworn in as chief minister on 3 June 2026, with G. Parameshwara as deputy chief minister, becoming the second Vokkaliga chief minister of Karnataka from the Indian National Congress.

No date for the next election has been formally notified by the Election Commission of India as of August 2026. In late May 2026, Karnataka BJP state president B. Y. Vijayendra publicly raised the possibility of mid-term polls, without offering specifics or evidence, fuelling speculation about the stability of the Congress government; the party leadership has not confirmed any such plan.

== Schedule ==
| Poll event | Schedule |
|---|---|
| Notification date | TBD |
| Last date for filing nomination | TBD |
| Scrutiny of nomination | TBD |
| Last date for withdrawal of nomination | TBD |
| Date of poll | TBD |
| Date of counting of votes | TBD |

== Parties and alliances ==
| Party | Flag | Symbol | Leader | Seats contested |
|---|---|---|---|---|
| Indian National Congress | | | D. K. Shivakumar | TBD |
| Bharatiya Janata Party | | | R. Ashoka | TBD |
| Janata Dal (Secular) | | | H. D. Kumaraswamy | TBD |
| Aam Aadmi Party | | | Mukhyamantri Chandru | TBD |
| Karnataka Rashtra Samithi | | | Ravi Krishna Reddy | TBD |
| Bahujan Samaj Party | | | M. Krishna Murthy | TBD |
| Uttama Prajaakeeya Party | | | Upendra Rao | TBD |
| Social Democratic Party of India | | | Abdul Majeed Mysore | TBD |
| All India Majlis-e-Ittehadul Muslimeen | | kite | Lateef Khan Amirkhan Pathan | TBD |
| Sarvodaya Karnataka Paksha | | | Darshan Puttannaiah | TBD |
| Samajwadi Party | | | N. Manjappa Yadav | TBD |
| Communist Party of India | | | Sati Sundaresh | TBD |
| Communist Party of India (Marxist) | | | K. Prakash | TBD |
| All India Forward Bloc | | | G.R. Shivashankar | TBD |
| Shiv Sena (Uddhav Balasaheb Thackeray) | | | | TBD |
| Communist Party of India (Marxist–Leninist) Liberation | | | Clifton D' Rozario | TBD |
| Nationalist Congress Party | | | Hari R | TBD |
| Janata Dal (United) | | | Mahima. J Patel | TBD |
| National People's Party | | | Dr. Ashok Kumar Xavier | TBD |
| Shiv Sena | | | Siddalinga Swami | TBD |

== Opinion polling ==
=== Seats projections ===
| Alliance | Seats |
| Alliance | Opinion seats |
|---|---|
| INDIA | 64–89 seats |
| NDA | 135–158 seats |
| Other parties | 1-2 seats |
| Independents | 0 - 4 seats |
| Total | 224 |

== Results ==
=== Results by alliance ===
| Alliance | Popular vote | | | Seats | | |
| Alliance | Votes | % | ±pp | Contested | Won | +/− |
|---|---|---|---|---|---|---|
| INDIA | | | | | | |
| NDA | | | | | | |
| Other parties | | | | | | |
| Independents | | | | | | |
| NOTA | | | | | | |
| Total | | 100% | — | | 224 | — |

== See also ==
- Elections in Karnataka
- Politics of Karnataka
- Shivakumar ministry
