= Devanahalli Assembly constituency =

Legislative Assembly constituency in Karnataka, India

Coordinates: 13.24°N 77.71°E

Devanahalli
- Constituency No. 179 for the Karnataka Legislative Assembly
- Map of Assembly constituency

Constituency details
- Country: India
- Region: South India
- State: Karnataka
- District: Bangalore Rural
- Lok Sabha constituency: Chikkaballapur
- Established: 1961
- Total electors: 212,209 (2023)
- Reservation: SC

Member of Legislative Assembly
- 16th Karnataka Legislative Assembly
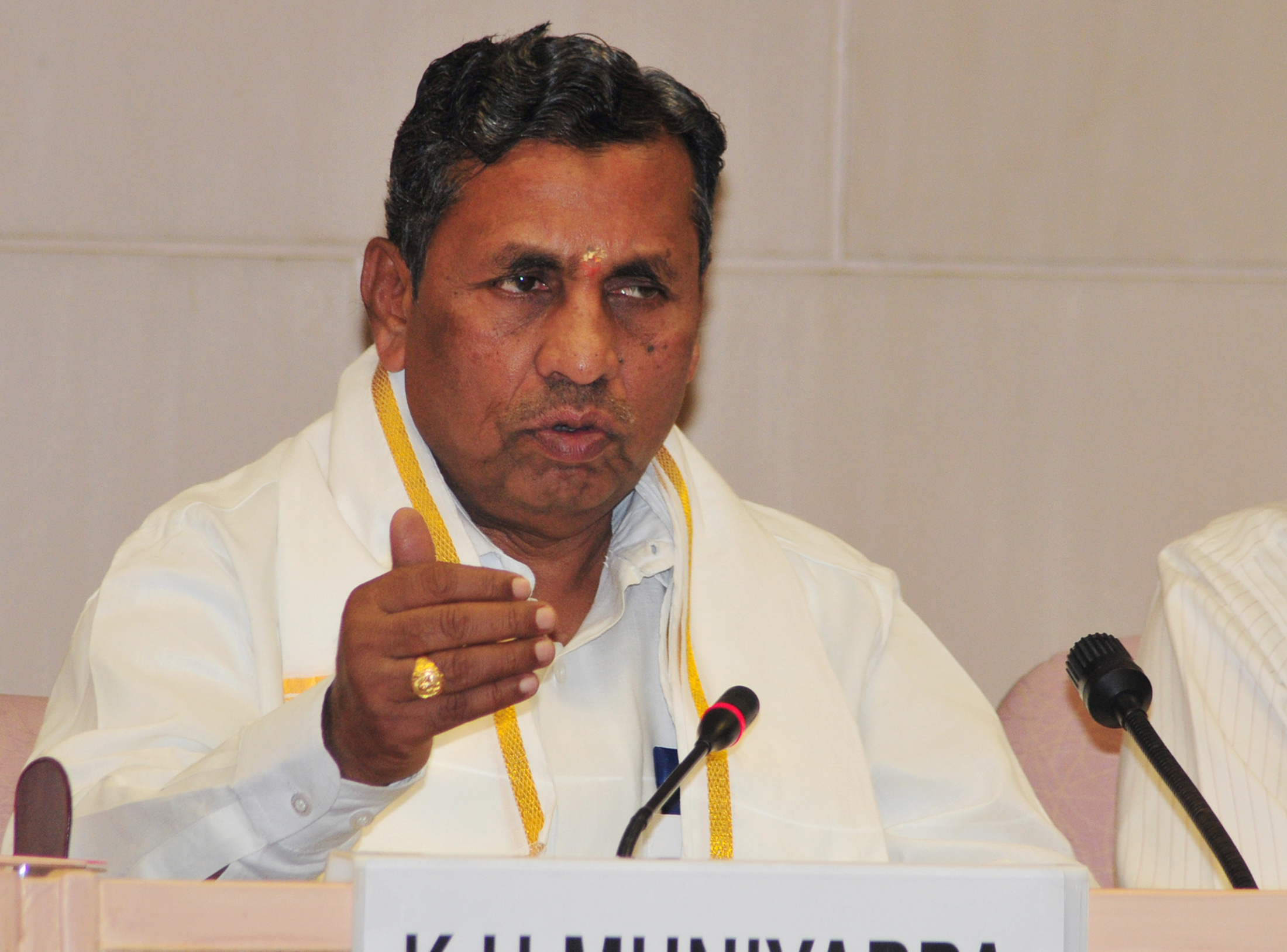
- Incumbent K. H. Muniyappa
- Party: Indian National Congress
- Elected year: 2023
- Preceded by: L. N. Narayanaswamy

Devanahalli Assembly constituency is one of the 224 constituencies in the Karnataka Legislative Assembly of Karnataka, a southern state of India. It is also part of Chikballapur Lok Sabha constituency.

== Members of the Legislative Assembly ==
| Election | Member | Party |
|---|---|---|
| 1962 | R. Muniswamiah | Indian National Congress |
| 1967 | D. S. Gowdh | Indian National Congress |
| 1972 | M. R. Jayaram | Indian National Congress |
| 1978 | B. N. Bache Gowda | Janata Party |
| 1983 | Mariyappa. A. M | Janata Party |
| 1985 | P. C. Munishamaiah | Janata Party |
| 1989 | R Muninarasimhaiah | Indian National Congress |
| 1994 | G. Chandranna | Janata Dal |
| 1999 | R Muninarasimhaiah | Indian National Congress |
| 2004 | G. Chandranna | Janata Dal |
| 2008 | Venkataswamy | Indian National Congress |
| 2013 | Pilla Munishamappa | Janata Dal |
| 2018 | Narayanaswamy. L. N | Janata Dal |
| 2023 | K. H. Muniyappa | Indian National Congress |

== Election results ==
=== Assembly Election 2023 ===
2023 Karnataka Legislative Assembly election : Devanahalli
| Party | Candidate | Votes | % | ±% |
|---|---|---|---|---|
| INC | K. H. Muniyappa | 73,058 | 40.46% | ▼0.41 |
| JD(S) | Nisarga Narayanaswamy. L. N | 68,427 | 37.90% | ▼12.91 |
| BJP | Pilla Munishamappa | 34,404 | 19.05% | ▲13.31 |
| NOTA | None of the above | 1,509 | 0.84% | ▲0.08 |
| AAP | B. K. Shivappa | 1,093 | 0.61% | New |
| Margin of victory | | 4,631 | 2.56% | ▼7.38 |
| Turnout | | 180,737 | 85.17% | ▲0.49 |
| Total valid votes | | 180,569 | | |
| Registered electors | | 212,209 | | ▲4.92 |
| INC gain from JD(S) | | Swing | ▼10.35 | |

=== Assembly Election 2018 ===
2018 Karnataka Legislative Assembly election : Devanahalli
| Party | Candidate | Votes | % | ±% |
|---|---|---|---|---|
| JD(S) | Narayanaswamy. L. N | 86,966 | 50.81% | ▲3.39 |
| INC | Venkataswamy | 69,956 | 40.87% | ▼5.24 |
| BJP | K. Nagesh | 9,820 | 5.74% | ▼0.61 |
| NOTA | None of the above | 1,300 | 0.76% | New |
| Margin of victory | | 17,010 | 9.94% | ▲8.63 |
| Turnout | | 171,277 | 84.68% | ▲1.84 |
| Total valid votes | | 171,158 | | |
| Registered electors | | 202,254 | | ▲9.10 |
| JD(S) hold | | Swing | ▲3.39 | |

=== Assembly Election 2013 ===
2013 Karnataka Legislative Assembly election : Devanahalli
| Party | Candidate | Votes | % | ±% |
|---|---|---|---|---|
| JD(S) | Pilla Munishamappa | 70,323 | 47.42% | ▲9.23 |
| INC | Venkataswamy | 68,381 | 46.11% | ▲2.92 |
| BJP | G. Chandranna | 9,418 | 6.35% | ▼4.87 |
| BSP | Venkatesh. P | 1,283 | 0.87% | ▼2.72 |
| BSRCP | D. R. Narayanaswamy | 1,201 | 0.81% | New |
| KJP | A. Hanumanthappa | 929 | 0.63% | New |
| Margin of victory | | 1,942 | 1.31% | ▼3.69 |
| Turnout | | 153,571 | 82.84% | ▲3.72 |
| Total valid votes | | 148,302 | | |
| Registered electors | | 185,388 | | ▲10.76 |
| JD(S) gain from INC | | Swing | ▲4.23 | |

=== Assembly Election 2008 ===
2008 Karnataka Legislative Assembly election : Devanahalli
| Party | Candidate | Votes | % | ±% |
|---|---|---|---|---|
| INC | Venkataswamy | 57,181 | 43.19% | ▲19.81 |
| JD(S) | G. Chandranna | 50,559 | 38.19% | ▼4.00 |
| BJP | K. Nagesh | 14,854 | 11.22% | New |
| BSP | Muniyappa M. (Koramangala Muniyappa) | 4,756 | 3.59% | ▼0.21 |
| Independent | M. Lokesh | 2,016 | 1.52% | New |
| SKP | Venkatappa. M | 1,255 | 0.95% | New |
| Margin of victory | | 6,622 | 5.00% | ▼13.80 |
| Turnout | | 132,429 | 79.12% | ▲5.52 |
| Total valid votes | | 132,398 | | |
| Registered electors | | 167,385 | | ▼15.27 |
| INC gain from JD(S) | | Swing | ▲1.00 | |

=== Assembly Election 2004 ===
2004 Karnataka Legislative Assembly election : Devanahalli
| Party | Candidate | Votes | % | ±% |
|---|---|---|---|---|
| JD(S) | G. Chandranna | 61,344 | 42.19% | ▲10.66 |
| INC | Muninarasimhaiah | 34,000 | 23.38% | ▼22.67 |
| Independent | Narayana Swamy. S. G | 33,298 | 22.90% | New |
| BSP | Koramangala Muniayappa. M | 5,528 | 3.80% | ▼0.01 |
| JD(U) | Gandhi. S. P | 2,711 | 1.86% | ▼16.75 |
| JP | Narayana Swamy. M | 2,220 | 1.53% | New |
| KRRS | Sidharth. S | 1,664 | 1.14% | New |
| Independent | Gare Marappa | 1,075 | 0.74% | New |
| Independent | Krishnappa. M | 1,051 | 0.72% | New |
| Margin of victory | | 27,344 | 18.80% | ▲4.28 |
| Turnout | | 145,413 | 73.60% | ▲0.95 |
| Total valid votes | | 145,413 | | |
| Registered electors | | 197,561 | | ▲7.20 |
| JD(S) gain from INC | | Swing | ▼3.86 | |

=== Assembly Election 1999 ===
1999 Karnataka Legislative Assembly election : Devanahalli
| Party | Candidate | Votes | % | ±% |
|---|---|---|---|---|
| INC | Muninarasimhaiah | 61,655 | 46.05% | ▲11.97 |
| JD(S) | G. Chandranna | 42,211 | 31.53% | New |
| JD(U) | M. Muniyappa Muninanjappa | 24,914 | 18.61% | New |
| BSP | M. Muniyappa Muddurappa | 5,103 | 3.81% | ▲2.39 |
| Margin of victory | | 19,444 | 14.52% | ▼8.95 |
| Turnout | | 133,883 | 72.65% | ▼5.12 |
| Total valid votes | | 133,883 | | |
| Registered electors | | 184,292 | | ▲19.32 |
| INC gain from JD | | Swing | ▼11.50 | |

=== Assembly Election 1994 ===
1994 Karnataka Legislative Assembly election : Devanahalli
| Party | Candidate | Votes | % | ±% |
|---|---|---|---|---|
| JD | G. Chandranna | 67,819 | 57.55% | ▲23.23 |
| INC | Muninarasimhaiah | 40,160 | 34.08% | ▼24.47 |
| BJP | C. Padmanabhaiah | 6,494 | 5.51% | New |
| BSP | M. Muniyappa | 1,675 | 1.42% | ▲0.58 |
| Margin of victory | | 27,659 | 23.47% | ▼0.76 |
| Turnout | | 120,113 | 77.77% | ▲3.33 |
| Total valid votes | | 117,836 | | |
| Rejected ballots | | 2,277 | 1.90% | ▼3.15 |
| Registered electors | | 154,450 | | ▲9.14 |
| JD gain from INC | | Swing | ▼1.00 | |

=== Assembly Election 1989 ===
1989 Karnataka Legislative Assembly election : Devanahalli
| Party | Candidate | Votes | % | ±% |
|---|---|---|---|---|
| INC | Muninarasimhaiah | 58,569 | 58.55% | ▲13.56 |
| JD | M. Muniyappa | 34,333 | 34.32% | New |
| JP | K. Narayanappa | 5,707 | 5.71% | New |
| BSP | C. Venkataramaiah | 838 | 0.84% | New |
| Margin of victory | | 24,236 | 24.23% | ▲16.46 |
| Turnout | | 105,351 | 74.44% | ▲3.68 |
| Total valid votes | | 100,032 | | |
| Rejected ballots | | 5,319 | 5.05% | ▲3.61 |
| Registered electors | | 141,521 | | ▲28.24 |
| INC gain from JP | | Swing | ▲5.80 | |

=== Assembly Election 1985 ===
1985 Karnataka Legislative Assembly election : Devanahalli
| Party | Candidate | Votes | % | ±% |
|---|---|---|---|---|
| JP | P. C. Munishamaiah | 40,603 | 52.75% | ▼0.32 |
| INC | H. Puttadasu | 34,625 | 44.99% | ▼0.33 |
| Independent | C. Venkataramaiah | 939 | 1.22% | New |
| Margin of victory | | 5,978 | 7.77% | ▲0.02 |
| Turnout | | 78,091 | 70.76% | ▼1.31 |
| Total valid votes | | 76,970 | | |
| Rejected ballots | | 1,121 | 1.44% | ▼0.49 |
| Registered electors | | 110,353 | | ▲10.50 |
| JP hold | | Swing | ▼0.32 | |

=== Assembly Election 1983 ===
1983 Karnataka Legislative Assembly election : Devanahalli
| Party | Candidate | Votes | % | ±% |
|---|---|---|---|---|
| JP | Mariyappa. A. M | 37,462 | 53.07% | ▲5.12 |
| INC | Venkatappa. M | 31,991 | 45.32% | ▲35.16 |
| INC(J) | Bachaiah. N | 1,131 | 1.60% | New |
| Margin of victory | | 5,471 | 7.75% | ▼0.51 |
| Turnout | | 71,974 | 72.07% | ▼6.13 |
| Total valid votes | | 70,584 | | |
| Rejected ballots | | 1,390 | 1.93% | ▼0.02 |
| Registered electors | | 99,863 | | ▲11.54 |
| JP hold | | Swing | ▲5.12 | |

=== Assembly Election 1978 ===
1978 Karnataka Legislative Assembly election : Devanahalli
| Party | Candidate | Votes | % | ±% |
|---|---|---|---|---|
| JP | B. N. Bache Gowda | 32,919 | 47.95% | New |
| INC(I) | Munu Gowda | 27,246 | 39.69% | New |
| INC | M. Somasekhara | 6,973 | 10.16% | ▼43.20 |
| Independent | Allappa | 1,043 | 1.52% | New |
| Independent | J. L. D. Souza | 472 | 0.69% | New |
| Margin of victory | | 5,673 | 8.26% | ▲1.54 |
| Turnout | | 70,018 | 78.20% | ▲12.68 |
| Total valid votes | | 68,653 | | |
| Rejected ballots | | 1,365 | 1.95% | ▲1.95 |
| Registered electors | | 89,532 | | ▲7.91 |
| JP gain from INC | | Swing | ▼5.41 | |

=== Assembly Election 1972 ===
1972 Mysore State Legislative Assembly election : Devanahalli
| Party | Candidate | Votes | % | ±% |
|---|---|---|---|---|
| INC | M. R. Jayaram | 28,211 | 53.36% | ▲4.45 |
| Independent | B. M. Krishnapppagowda | 24,657 | 46.64% | New |
| Margin of victory | | 3,554 | 6.72% | ▲5.23 |
| Turnout | | 54,365 | 65.52% | ▲1.50 |
| Total valid votes | | 52,868 | | |
| Registered electors | | 82,972 | | ▲27.45 |
| INC hold | | Swing | ▲4.45 | |

=== Assembly Election 1967 ===
1967 Mysore State Legislative Assembly election : Devanahalli
| Party | Candidate | Votes | % | ±% |
|---|---|---|---|---|
| INC | D. S. Gowdh | 19,439 | 48.91% | ▼14.07 |
| Independent | B. Venkatarayappa | 18,845 | 47.41% | New |
| Independent | B. Ramappa | 1,462 | 3.68% | New |
| Margin of victory | | 594 | 1.49% | ▼24.46 |
| Turnout | | 41,676 | 64.02% | ▲26.22 |
| Total valid votes | | 39,746 | | |
| Registered electors | | 65,100 | | ▲21.29 |
| INC hold | | Swing | ▼14.07 | |

=== Assembly Election 1962 ===
1962 Mysore State Legislative Assembly election : Devanahalli
| Party | Candidate | Votes | % | ±% |
|---|---|---|---|---|
| INC | R. Muniswamiah | 12,103 | 62.98% | New |
| SWA | H. V. Nanjaiah | 7,115 | 37.02% | New |
| Margin of victory | | 4,988 | 25.95% | |
| Turnout | | 20,290 | 37.80% | |
| Total valid votes | | 19,218 | | |
| Registered electors | | 53,672 | | |
| INC win (new seat) | | | | |

== See also ==
- Bangalore Rural district
- List of constituencies of Karnataka Legislative Assembly
