= M. D. Nanjundaswamy =

Gandhian leader, anti-globalization activist

- Born: 13 February 1936
- Died: 3 February 2004 (aged 67); Bangalore, India
- Occupations: Activist; professor; politician
- Spouse: Prathima
- Children: 2

Mahantha Devaru Nanjundaswamy (13 February 1936 – 3 February 2004) was an Indian Gandhian leader, scholar and activist, who advocated for farmers' rights. He is one of the founders of Karnataka Rajya Raitha Sangha (KRRS) in 1980. He was a prominent anti-globalization campaign leader.

== Early life ==
Nanjundswamy was born in Mysore to M. N. Mahantha Devaru and Rajammanni. His father was a farmer-turned-lawyer from Madrahalli village in Thirumakudalu Narasipura taluka, and was a member of the erstwhile Mysore Representative Assembly and later, the Karnataka Legislative Assembly. He was the fifth child of the couple. He was credited to be the first post-graduate from Mysore State. After securing a bachelor of science degree in Life Sciences from the University of Mysore, he pursued graduation in Law at Karnatak University, but wanted to become a doctor like his brother, who was an ENT specialist. As Nanjundswamy failed to secure a seat in medical studies, his parents sent him abroad to the Hague Academy of International Law in the Netherlands to complete his post-graduation in Law. Then he went on to study Constitutional Law in Germany and France before returning to Indian in 1964. His daughter, Chukki, lives in Mysore and runs Amrita Bhoomi, an agricultural school, started by him.

== Career ==
Nanjundaswamy began his career as a professor of law at the University of Mysore and later the Dr. Rammanohar Lohia College of Law in Bangalore. As a socialist, he was involved with the Samajwadi Yuvajana Sabha, and worked in close association with other socialists such as Ram Manohar Lohia and Shantaveri Gopala Gowda. In 1975, Nanjundaswamy launched the JP Movement in Karnataka and founded the Nava Nirmana Kranti, along with former Chief Minister of Karnataka, Kadidal Manjappa, and writer Poornachandra Tejaswi.

In 1980, Nanjundaswamy formed the Karnataka Rajya Raitha Sangha (Karnataka State Farmers' Association; KRRS) in 1980. As president of the KRRS, he led campaigns against agricultural patenting by multi-national corporations, which he called "Western biopiracy". He was a strong critic of multi-national companies in India and the World Trade Organization (WTO), and had a hand in the 1999 Seattle WTO protests.

In 1996, he protested the opening of the first McDonald's outlet in Delhi. He also led the ransacking of newly-opened Pizza Hut and Kentucky Fried Chicken restaurants in Bangalore. He and his supporters stormed and ransacked the offices of the seed company Cargill, and burned Monsanto's genetically modified crops with their Cremation Monsanto movement, before taking on other companies such as PepsiCo and the Coca-Cola Company.

The KRRS was later registered as a political party and was instrumental in supporting non-Indian National Congress governments in Karnataka.

Nanjundaswamy, who was suffering from lung cancer, died on 3 February 2004 in Bangalore. The last rites were performed on Amrithabhoomi on the foothills of Biligiriranga Hills in Chamarajanagar district. On his birth anniversary on 13 February 2023, Yogendra Yadav, founder of Jai Kisan Andolan, remembered Nanjundaswamy and delivered a speech about the farmers' movement led by him in Chamarajanagar, where a main road in the district headquarters was named after him.
