= Kanakagiri Assembly constituency =

Legislative Assembly constituency in Karnataka State, India

Coordinates: 15.57°N 76.42°E

Kanakagiri
- Constituency No. 61 for the Karnataka Legislative Assembly

Constituency details
- Country: India
- Region: South India
- State: Karnataka
- District: Koppal
- Lok Sabha constituency: Koppal
- Established: 1976
- Total electors: 224,068
- Reservation: SC

Member of Legislative Assembly
- 16th Karnataka Legislative Assembly
- Incumbent Shivaraj Tangadagi
- Party: Indian National Congress
- Elected year: 2023
- Preceded by: Basavaraj Dhadesugur

Kanakagiri Assembly constituency is one of the 224 Legislative Assembly constituencies of Karnataka in India.

It is part of Koppal district and is reserved for candidates belonging to the Scheduled Castes.

== Members of the Legislative Assembly ==
Election	Member	Party
1978	M. Nagappa Mukappa	Indian National Congress
1983	Srirangadevarayalu Venkarayalu	Indian National Congress
1985	Srirangadevarayalu Venkarayalu	Indian National Congress
1989	M. Mallikarjuna Nagappa	Indian National Congress
1994	Nagappa Bheemappa Saloni	Janata Dal
1999	M. Malikarjun Nagappa	Indian National Congress
2004	Veerappa Devappa Kesarahatti. G	Bharatiya Janata Party
2008	Shivaraj Tangadagi	Independent politician
2013	Shivaraj Tangadagi	Indian National Congress
2018	Basavaraj Dadesugur	Bharatiya Janata Party
2023	Shivaraj Tangadagi	Indian National Congress

== Election results ==
=== Assembly Election 2023 ===
2023 Karnataka Legislative Assembly election : Kanakagiri
Party	Candidate	Votes	%	±%
INC	Tangadagi Shivaraj Sangappa	106,164	60.13%	▲16.25
BJP	Basavaraj Dadesugur	63,532	35.98%	▼16.40
NOTA	None of the above	1,600	0.91%	▼0.09
KRPP	Charul Venkantramana Dasari	1,319	0.75%	New
Margin of victory		42,632	24.15%	▲15.66
Turnout		176,584	78.81%	▼0.39
Total valid votes		176,553		
Registered electors		224,068		▲5.91
INC gain from BJP		Swing	▲7.75	

=== Assembly Election 2018 ===
2018 Karnataka Legislative Assembly election : Kanakagiri
Party	Candidate	Votes	%	±%
BJP	Basavaraj Dadesugur	87,735	52.38%	▲50.03
INC	Shivaraj Tangadagi	73,510	43.88%	▲4.43
NOTA	None of the above	1,677	1.00%	New
JD(S)	Manjula Ravikumar	1,464	0.87%	▼0.06
Margin of victory		14,225	8.49%	▲4.46
Turnout		167,551	79.20%	▲5.21
Total valid votes		167,506		
Registered electors		211,567		▲15.22
BJP gain from INC		Swing	▲12.93	

=== Assembly Election 2013 ===
2013 Karnataka Legislative Assembly election : Kanakagiri
Party	Candidate	Votes	%	±%
INC	Shivaraj Tangadagi	49,451	39.45%	▲7.83
KJP	Basavaraj Dadesugur	44,399	35.42%	New
BSRCP	Bhavanimatha Mukundarao	28,117	22.43%	New
BJP	Ramanayak Lachamapppa Nayak Lamani	2,948	2.35%	▼9.10
Independent	Ramesh Koti	1,524	1.22%	New
Independent	Vithoba Baladasappa Dasar	1,418	1.13%	New
JD(S)	Prakasha. L. Rathod	1,166	0.93%	▼1.51
Independent	Palakshayya Shivamurthayya Hiremath	1,080	0.86%	New
Independent	Tippanna. V	1,062	0.85%	New
Margin of victory		5,052	4.03%	▲1.77
Turnout		135,864	73.99%	▲17.66
Total valid votes		125,343		
Registered electors		183,620		▲7.00
INC gain from Independent		Swing	▲5.57	

=== Assembly Election 2008 ===
2008 Karnataka Legislative Assembly election : Kanakagiri
Party	Candidate	Votes	%	±%
Independent	Shivaraj Tangadagi	32,743	33.88%	New
INC	Bhavanimatha Mukundarao	30,560	31.62%	▼5.29
BJP	Shamanna Hulugappa Narinal	11,068	11.45%	▼30.46
CPI(ML)L	Mareppa Jambanna	6,814	7.05%	New
Independent	Shivappa Krishnappa	2,365	2.45%	New
JD(S)	Yamanurappa Nadulamani	2,362	2.44%	▼4.84
Independent	Marappa Ramachandrappa Moti(veshagara)	1,751	1.81%	New
Independent	F. Shanmukappa	1,513	1.57%	New
Independent	B. Husenappaswami S/o Durugappa	1,347	1.39%	New
Margin of victory		2,183	2.26%	▼2.74
Turnout		96,670	56.33%	▼6.78
Total valid votes		96,650		
Registered electors		171,602		▼2.84
Independent gain from BJP		Swing	▼8.03	

=== Assembly Election 2004 ===
2004 Karnataka Legislative Assembly election : Kanakagiri
Party	Candidate	Votes	%	±%
BJP	Veerappa Devappa Kesarahatti. G	46,712	41.91%	New
INC	Mallikarjuna Nagappa. M	41,136	36.91%	▼22.49
JD(S)	Basappa Arali	8,116	7.28%	▲6.04
Independent	Hanumesh Naik	7,570	6.79%	New
BSP	Arati Tippanna	2,098	1.88%	▼0.01
Kannada Nadu Party	Anilkumar Shivashankarappa Bijjal	1,238	1.11%	New
Independent	Karakappa Amaranna	1,007	0.90%	New
Independent	Ramesh Patil Hire Beragi	870	0.78%	New
Urs Samyuktha Paksha	Ranga Subbiah	735	0.66%	New
Margin of victory		5,576	5.00%	▼19.70
Turnout		111,465	63.11%	▼0.56
Total valid votes		111,446		
Registered electors		176,618		▲13.70
BJP gain from INC		Swing	▼17.49	

=== Assembly Election 1999 ===
1999 Karnataka Legislative Assembly election : Kanakagiri
Party	Candidate	Votes	%	±%
INC	M. Malikarjun Nagappa	55,808	59.40%	▲21.22
JD(U)	Nagappa Bheemappa Saloni	32,601	34.70%	New
BSP	K. Ramojappa	1,779	1.89%	New
KRRS	Thippe Rudraswamy. A	1,733	1.84%	▼12.32
JD(S)	Sarojamma	1,169	1.24%	New
Independent	S. V. Patil	596	0.63%	New
Margin of victory		23,207	24.70%	▲24.47
Turnout		98,913	63.67%	▲0.70
Total valid votes		93,953		
Rejected ballots		4,960	5.01%	▲0.82
Registered electors		155,341		▲11.67
INC gain from JD		Swing	▲20.99	

=== Assembly Election 1994 ===
1994 Karnataka Legislative Assembly election : Kanakagiri
Party	Candidate	Votes	%	±%
JD	Nagappa Bheemappa Saloni	32,238	38.41%	▼2.70
INC	M. Malikarjun Nagappa	32,045	38.18%	▼15.87
KRRS	Tipperudraswamy Nagayyaswamy	11,888	14.16%	New
INC	Dr. K. N. Patil	5,323	6.34%	New
BJP	Chandrakanta Rani	1,915	2.28%	New
Margin of victory		193	0.23%	▼12.71
Turnout		87,596	62.97%	▲1.16
Total valid votes		83,926		
Rejected ballots		3,670	4.19%	▼2.69
Registered electors		139,111		▲8.71
JD gain from INC		Swing	▼15.64	

=== Assembly Election 1989 ===
1989 Karnataka Legislative Assembly election : Kanakagiri
Party	Candidate	Votes	%	±%
INC	M. Mallikarjuna	39,812	54.05%	▲3.49
JD	Nagappa	30,279	41.11%	New
JP	K. Venkata Rao Bulliveera Swamy	1,806	2.45%	New
Kranti Sabha	Manteppa Turvihal	1,760	2.39%	New
Margin of victory		9,533	12.94%	▲11.81
Turnout		79,098	61.81%	▼2.20
Total valid votes		73,657		
Rejected ballots		5,441	6.88%	▲3.47
Registered electors		127,971		▲34.29
INC hold		Swing	▲3.49	

=== Assembly Election 1985 ===
1985 Karnataka Legislative Assembly election : Kanakagiri
Party	Candidate	Votes	%	±%
INC	Srirangadevarayalu	29,791	50.56%	▼28.55
JP	Nagappa Bheemappa Saloni	29,128	49.44%	New
Margin of victory		663	1.13%	▼60.85
Turnout		60,996	64.01%	▲25.39
Total valid votes		58,919		
Rejected ballots		2,077	3.41%	▼0.86
Registered electors		95,291		▲7.24
INC hold		Swing	▼28.55	

=== Assembly Election 1983 ===
1983 Karnataka Legislative Assembly election : Kanakagiri
Party	Candidate	Votes	%	±%
INC	Srirangadevarayalu Venkarayalu	25,992	79.11%	▲69.29
Independent	Durgadas	5,629	17.13%	New
Independent	Hiremath Babu Basalingayya	1,233	3.75%	New
Margin of victory		20,363	61.98%	▲31.00
Turnout		34,318	38.62%	▼24.78
Total valid votes		32,854		
Rejected ballots		1,464	4.27%	▼0.41
Registered electors		88,861		▲10.87
INC gain from INC(I)		Swing	▲21.44	

=== Assembly Election 1978 ===
1978 Karnataka Legislative Assembly election : Kanakagiri
Party	Candidate	Votes	%	±%
INC(I)	M. Nagappa Mukappa	27,932	57.67%	New
JP	Mariyappa Doddabasappa Bhatada	12,924	26.68%	New
INC	Basavant Rao Basanagounda	4,755	9.82%	New
RPI(K)	Bheemanagounda Rayanagounda	2,826	5.83%	New
Margin of victory		15,008	30.98%	
Turnout		50,815	63.40%	
Total valid votes		48,437		
Rejected ballots		2,378	4.68%	
Registered electors		80,148		
INC(I) win (new seat)				

== See also ==
- List of constituencies of the Karnataka Legislative Assembly
- Koppal district
