= C. S. Puttaraju =

Indian politician

Minister for minor irrigation (Government of Karnataka)
- In office 6 June 2018 – 23 July 2019
- Preceded by: Krishna Byre Gowda

Member of the Indian Parliament for Mandya
- In office 16 May 2014 – 21 May 2018
- Preceded by: Ramya
- Succeeded by: L. R. Shivarame Gowda

Member of Karnataka Legislative Assembly
- In office 15 May 2018 – 13 May 2023
- Preceded by: K. S. Puttannaiah
- Succeeded by: Darshan Puttannaiah
- Constituency: Melukote
- In office 2008–2013
- Preceded by: Himself. As MLA of Pandavapura
- Succeeded by: K. S. Puttannaiah
- Constituency: Melukote
- In office 2004–2007
- Preceded by: K. Kempegowda
- Succeeded by: Himself. As MLA of Melukote
- Constituency: Melukote

Personal details
- Born: Chinakurali, Mandya, Karnataka State, India
- Party: Janata Dal (Secular)
- Occupation: Agriculturist
- As of 23 May, 2018

C. S. Puttaraju is an Indian politician belonging to the Janata Dal (Secular) party. He was the last MLA from Pandavapura constituency in Karnataka, from 2004 to 2008 and also the first MLA of Melukote constituency from 2008-2013.In the 2014 Indian General Election, he defeated incumbent Indian National Congress candidate Ramya and became a member of the Parliament 16th Lok Sabha representing Mandya in Karnataka. In 2018, he was elected to Karnataka Vidhana Sabha from Melukote constituency, and vacated his Lok Sabha seat. He was the Minor Irrigation and Mandya district in-charge Minister in HD Kumaraswamy’s cabinet.
