= Melukote Assembly constituency =

Legislative Assembly constituency in Karnataka State, India

Coordinates: 12.66°N 76.65°E

Melukote
- Constituency No. 188 for the Karnataka Legislative Assembly

Constituency details
- Country: India
- Region: South India
- State: Karnataka
- District: Mandya
- Lok Sabha constituency: Mandya
- Established: 2008
- Total electors: 200,184
- Reservation: None

Member of Legislative Assembly
- 16th Karnataka Legislative Assembly
- Incumbent Darshan Puttannaiah
- Party: SKP
- Alliance: INDIA
- Elected year: 2023
- Preceded by: C. S. Puttaraju

Melukote Assembly constituency is one of the 224 Legislative Assembly constituencies of Karnataka in India.

It is part of Mandya district.

== Members of the Legislative Assembly ==
Election	Member	Party
2008	C. S. Puttaraju	Janata Dal
2013	K. S. Puttannaiah	Sarvodaya Karnataka Paksha
2018	C. S. Puttaraju	Janata Dal
2023	Darshan Puttannaiah	Sarvodaya Karnataka Paksha

== Election results ==
=== Assembly Election 2023 ===
2023 Karnataka Legislative Assembly election : Melukote
Party	Candidate	Votes	%	±%
SKP	Darshan Puttannaiah	91,151	49.57	New
JD(S)	C. S. Puttaraju	80,289	43.66	▼11.21
BJP	Dr. Indresh. N. S	6,470	3.52	▲2.61
Kranti Sabha	Mahendra Kumar K. R.	1,379	0.75	New
BSP	Yoganandagowda	1,157	0.63	New
NOTA	None of the above	480	0.26	▼0.30
Margin of victory		10,862	5.91	▼6.79
Turnout		183,954	91.89	▲2.37
Total valid votes		183,883		
Registered electors		200,184		▲2.40
SKP gain from JD(S)		Swing	▼5.30	

=== Assembly Election 2018 ===
2018 Karnataka Legislative Assembly election : Melukote
Party	Candidate	Votes	%	±%
JD(S)	C. S. Puttaraju	96,003	54.87	▲8.94
Swaraj India	Darshan Puttannaiah	73,779	42.17	New
BJP	Sundahalli Somashekara	1,595	0.91	New
NOTA	None of the above	979	0.56	New
Margin of victory		22,224	12.70	▲6.26
Turnout		174,999	89.52	▲5.40
Total valid votes		174,965		
Registered electors		195,487		▲2.14
JD(S) gain from SKP		Swing	▲2.49	

=== Assembly Election 2013 ===
2013 Karnataka Legislative Assembly election : Melukote
Party	Candidate	Votes	%	±%
SKP	K. S. Puttannaiah	80,041	52.38	▲13.15
JD(S)	C. S. Puttaraju	70,193	45.93	▼1.87
INC	L. D. Ravi	2,314	1.51	▼1.79
Independent	Puttannaiah S/o Nanjappa	1,605	1.05	New
Independent	S. Vasanthakumar	1,368	0.90	New
BSP	Mahesha. M. M	1,362	0.89	▼1.42
Margin of victory		9,848	6.44	▼2.13
Turnout		161,011	84.12	▲4.36
Total valid votes		152,818		
Registered electors		191,398		▲9.41
SKP gain from JD(S)		Swing	▲4.58	

=== Assembly Election 2008 ===
2008 Karnataka Legislative Assembly election : Melukote
Party	Candidate	Votes	%	±%
JD(S)	C. S. Puttaraju	66,626	47.80	New
SKP	K. S. Puttannaiah	54,681	39.23	New
INC	C. Annegowda	4,600	3.30	New
BJP	K. Kempegowda	4,265	3.06	New
BSP	Rangaswamy	3,217	2.31	New
Independent	N. Basavaraju	2,889	2.07	New
Independent	N. C. Puttaswamy	2,179	1.56	New
SP	Govindaraju	929	0.67	New
Margin of victory		11,945	8.57	
Turnout		139,542	79.76	
Total valid votes		139,386		
Registered electors		174,942		
JD(S) win (new seat)				

== See also ==
- List of constituencies of the Karnataka Legislative Assembly
- Mandya district
