= Devar Hippargi Assembly constituency =

Constituency of the Karnataka legislative assembly in India

Coordinates: 16.82°N 76.06°E

Devar Hippargi
- Constituency No. 27 for the Karnataka Legislative Assembly

Constituency details
- Country: India
- Region: South India
- State: Karnataka
- District: Bijapur
- Lok Sabha constituency: Bijapur
- Established: 2008
- Total electors: 219,228
- Reservation: None

Member of Legislative Assembly
- 16th Karnataka Legislative Assembly
- Incumbent Bhimanagouda Patil
- Party: JD(S)
- Alliance: NDA
- Elected year: 2018
- Preceded by: Sonamagouda Patil

Devar Hippargi Assembly constituency is one of 224 assembly constituencies in Karnataka, in India. It is part of Bijapur Lok Sabha constituency.

Bhimanagouda Patil is the current MLA from Devar Hippargi.

== Members of the Legislative Assembly ==
Election	Member	Party
2008	A. S. Patil (Nadahalli)	Indian National Congress
2013	A. S. Patil (Nadahalli)	Indian National Congress
2018	Somanagouda B. Patil (Sasanur)	Bharatiya Janata Party
2023	Bhimanagouda Patil	Janata Dal

== Election results ==
=== Assembly Election 2023 ===
2023 Karnataka Legislative Assembly election : Devar Hippargi
Party	Candidate	Votes	%	±%
JD(S)	Bhimanagouda Patil	65,952	43.39%	▲11.11
BJP	Somanagouda B. Patil (Sasanur)	45,777	30.12%	▼4.57
INC	Sunagar Sharanappa Tippanna	33,673	22.16%	▼5.19
AAP	Basalingappa Urf Basalingappagouda S/o Basavantaray Ingalagi	1,787	1.18%	▼1.06
Independent	Bhimanagouda Basanagouda Patil	1,044	0.69%	New
NOTA	None of the above	695	0.46%	▼0.36
Margin of victory		20,175	13.27%	▲10.86
Turnout		152,058	69.36%	▲2.66
Total valid votes		151,983		
Registered electors		219,228		▲5.06
JD(S) gain from BJP		Swing	▲8.70	

=== Assembly Election 2018 ===
2018 Karnataka Legislative Assembly election : Devar Hippargi
Party	Candidate	Votes	%	±%
BJP	Somanagouda B. Patil (Sasanur)	48,245	34.69%	▲10.28
JD(S)	Bhimanagouda Patil	44,892	32.28%	▲25.24
INC	B. S. Patil (Yalagi)	38,038	27.35%	▼4.09
AAP	Asif Herkal	3,111	2.24%	New
NOTA	None of the above	1,139	0.82%	New
Independent	Sidramappa Nagappa Mathad	878	0.63%	New
AIMEP	Kiran Sidramayya Soulabavimath	855	0.61%	New
Margin of victory		3,353	2.41%	▼4.62
Turnout		139,190	66.70%	▲2.00
Total valid votes		139,079		
Registered electors		208,670		▲17.14
BJP gain from INC		Swing	▲3.25	

=== Assembly Election 2013 ===
2013 Karnataka Legislative Assembly election : Devar Hippargi
Party	Candidate	Votes	%	±%
INC	A. S. Patil (Nadahalli)	36,231	31.44%	▼22.78
BJP	Somanagouda B. Patil (Sasanur)	28,135	24.41%	▲0.71
KJP	Bhimanagouda Patil	24,707	21.44%	New
Independent	Sureshagouda Mudigoudappagouda Patil	12,421	10.78%	New
JD(S)	Reshmakousar Khajabandenawaj Padekanur	8,118	7.04%	▼6.85
BSP	Yashavant Malappa Pujari	1,069	0.93%	▼1.22
Independent	Shashidhar Basanna	968	0.84%	New
WPOI	Irfanullah Hafizulla Munasi	895	0.78%	New
Margin of victory		8,096	7.03%	▼23.49
Turnout		115,259	64.70%	▲3.17
Total valid votes		115,245		
Registered electors		178,141		▲8.30
INC hold		Swing	▼22.78	

=== Assembly Election 2008 ===
2008 Karnataka Legislative Assembly election : Devar Hippargi
Party	Candidate	Votes	%	±%
INC	A. S. Patil (Nadahalli)	54,879	54.22%	New
BJP	Basanagouda. R. Patil (Yatnal)	23,986	23.70%	New
JD(S)	Desai Shivaputrappa Madivalappa	14,059	13.89%	New
BSP	Yashavant Malappa Pujari	2,178	2.15%	New
Independent	Madagi Annappa Basappa	2,130	2.10%	New
JD(U)	Patil Ninganagouda Ramanagouda	1,211	1.20%	New
Independent	Kashinath Channabasappa Masabinal	1,083	1.07%	New
Independent	Natikar Shankar Paramanna	685	0.68%	New
Margin of victory		30,893	30.52%	
Turnout		101,213	61.53%	
Total valid votes		101,210		
Registered electors		164,493		
INC win (new seat)				

== See also ==
- List of constituencies of the Karnataka Legislative Assembly
