= K. S. Puttannaiah =

Indian politician (1949–2018)

Member of the Karnataka Legislative Assembly
- In office 2013–2018
- Movement: Karnataka Rajya Raitha Sangha
- Preceded by: C. S. Puttaraju
- Succeeded by: C. S. Puttaraju
- Constituency: Melukote
- In office 1994–1999
- Preceded by: K. Kempegowda
- Succeeded by: C. S. Puttaraju
- Constituency: Pandavapura

Personal details
- Born: 23 December 1949 Kyathanahalli, Mysore State, India
- Died: 18 February 2018 (aged 68) Mandya, Karnataka, India
- Party: Sarvodaya Karnataka Party
- Other political affiliations: Karnataka Rajya Raitha Sangha
- Spouse: Sunitha Puttannaiah
- Relations: K. S. Ramesh (brother)
- Children: 3 (including Darshan Puttannaiah)
- Education: St. Philomena's College, Mysore

K. S. Puttannaiah (23 December 1949 – 18 February 2018) was an Indian politician. He was Member of the Karnataka Legislative Assembly from the Melukote Assembly constituency being associated with the Sarvodaya Karnataka Party.

== Early life and education ==
Puttannaiah was born in Kyathanahalli village, Mandya district on 23 December 1949, Puttannaiah attended St. Philomena College and earned a bachelor's degree from D. Banumaiah College.

== Personal life ==
Puttannaiah has left his entire family to his wife, to take care of. He had a brother, K. S. Ramesh who died in 2006.

He was married to Sunitha Puttannaiah, with two daughters Smitha Puttannaiah and Akshatha Puttannaiah, one son, Darshan Puttannaiah.

== Career ==
He became a karyakarta of the Karnataka Rajya Raitha Sangha in August 1983. Puttannaiah ran for a seat on the Karnataka Legislative Assembly in 1994, serving Pandavapura until 1999. Later that year, he was named president of Karnataka Rajya Raitha Sangha. While president of Karnataka Rajya Raitha Sangha, Puttannaiah contested three Karnataka Legislative Assembly elections and one Lok Sabha election, all of which he lost. He has been a hero to farmers and has saved thousands of farmers from having suicides. In 2013, he ran in the Melkote constituency, representing the Sarvodaya Karnataka Paksha. Puttannaiah had a heart attack on 18 February 2018 while watching Kabaddi at Visvesvaraya Stadium in Mandya. He was declared dead after being sent to the Mandya Institute of Medical Sciences. Puttannaiah's funeral, held on 22 February 2018 in Kyathanahalli, was attended by several thousand people.
