= Raichur Rural Assembly constituency =

Legislative Assembly constituency in Karnataka State, India

Coordinates: 16.22°N 77.36°E

Raichur Rural
- Constituency No. 53 for the Karnataka Legislative Assembly

Constituency details
- Country: India
- Region: South India
- State: Karnataka
- District: Raichur
- Lok Sabha constituency: Raichur
- Established: 2008
- Total electors: 229,071
- Reservation: ST

Member of Legislative Assembly
- 16th Karnataka Legislative Assembly
- Incumbent Basanagouda Daddal
- Party: Indian National Congress
- Elected year: 2023
- Preceded by: Thipparaju Hawaldar

Raichur Rural Assembly constituency is one of the 224 Legislative Assembly constituencies of Karnataka in India.

It is part of Raichur district and is reserved for candidates belonging to the Scheduled Tribes. As of 2023, it is represented by Basanagouda Daddal of the Indian National Congress party.

== Members of the Legislative Assembly ==
Election	Member	Party
2008	Raja Rayappa Naik	Indian National Congress
2013	Thipparaju	Bharatiya Janata Party
2018	Basanagouda Daddal	Indian National Congress
2023	Basanagouda Daddal	Indian National Congress

== Election results ==
=== Assembly Election 2023 ===
2023 Karnataka Legislative Assembly election : Raichur Rural
Party	Candidate	Votes	%	±%
INC	Basanagouda Daddal	89,140	51.42%	▲10.19
BJP	Tipparaju Hawaldar	75,283	43.43%	▲8.37
JD(S)	K. Narasimha Nayak	4,127	2.38%	▼18.80
AAP	Shubhashchandra Sambaji	1,535	0.89%	New
NOTA	None of the above	1,456	0.84%	▼0.28
Margin of victory		13,857	7.99%	▲1.83
Turnout		173,410	75.70%	▲6.41
Total valid votes		173,361		
Registered electors		229,071		▼1.88
INC hold		Swing	▲10.19	

=== Assembly Election 2018 ===
2018 Karnataka Legislative Assembly election : Raichur Rural
Party	Candidate	Votes	%	±%
INC	Basanagouda Daddal	66,656	41.23%	▼6.34
BJP	Tipparaju Hawaldar	56,692	35.06%	▼15.80
JD(S)	Ravi Kumar Patil	34,250	21.18%	▼0.56
NOTA	None of the above	1,806	1.12%	New
AIMEP	Ramayya Nayaka	1,273	0.79%	New
Independent	Huligemma Shivaraj Ghante	1,004	0.62%	New
Margin of victory		9,964	6.16%	▲2.87
Turnout		161,770	69.29%	▲0.42
Total valid votes		161,681		
Registered electors		233,464		▲19.33
INC gain from BJP		Swing	▼9.63	

=== Assembly Election 2013 ===
2013 Karnataka Legislative Assembly election : Raichur Rural
Party	Candidate	Votes	%	±%
BJP	Thipparaju	50,497	50.86%	▲23.04
INC	Raja Rayappa Naik	47,227	47.57%	▲14.65
JD(S)	Raja Amareshwara Naik	21,584	21.74%	▼9.39
KJP	R. Mallesh Naik	5,861	5.90%	New
BSP	Vijayalakshmi Madapanura	2,568	2.59%	▼5.54
Independent	Chinnayya Naik	2,529	2.55%	New
Independent	Anjanayya	1,258	1.27%	New
CPI(ML) Red Star	Lalappa Naik	889	0.90%	New
NPP	Swamy	854	0.86%	New
Margin of victory		3,270	3.29%	▲1.50
Turnout		134,750	68.87%	▲12.58
Total valid votes		99,286		
Registered electors		195,648		▲5.28
BJP gain from INC		Swing	▲17.94	

=== Assembly Election 2008 ===
2008 Karnataka Legislative Assembly election : Raichur Rural
Party	Candidate	Votes	%	±%
INC	Raja Rayappa Naik	34,432	32.92%	New
JD(S)	Raja Rangappa Naik	32,555	31.13%	New
BJP	Basanagouda Daddal	29,097	27.82%	New
BSP	K. B. Shanthappa	8,499	8.13%	New
Margin of victory		1,877	1.79%	
Turnout		104,603	56.29%	
Total valid votes		104,583		
Registered electors		185,830		
INC win (new seat)				

== See also ==
- List of constituencies of the Karnataka Legislative Assembly
- Raichur district
