= Shimoga Rural Assembly constituency =

Legislative Assembly constituency in Karnataka State, India

Coordinates: 14.04°N 75.37°E

Shimoga Rural
- Constituency No. 111 for the Karnataka Legislative Assembly

Constituency details
- Country: India
- Region: South India
- State: Karnataka
- Division: Bangalore
- District: Shimoga
- Lok Sabha constituency: Shimoga
- Established: 2008
- Total electors: 212,458
- Reservation: SC

Member of Legislative Assembly
- 16th Karnataka Legislative Assembly
- Incumbent Sharada Puryanaik
- Party: JD(S)
- Alliance: NDA
- Elected year: 2023
- Preceded by: K. B. Ashok Naik

Shimoga Rural Assembly constituency is one of the 224 Legislative Assembly constituencies of Karnataka in India.

It is part of Shimoga district and is reserved for candidates belonging to the Scheduled Castes.

== Members of the Legislative Assembly ==
Election	Member	Party
2008	K. G. Kumara Swamy	Bharatiya Janata Party
2013	Sharada Puryanaik	Janata Dal
2018	K. B. Ashok Naik	Bharatiya Janata Party
2023	Sharada Puryanaik	Janata Dal

== Election results ==
=== Assembly Election 2023 ===
2023 Karnataka Legislative Assembly election : Shimoga Rural
Party	Candidate	Votes	%	±%
JD(S)	Sharada Puryanaik	86,340	47.74%	▲9.68
BJP	K. B. Ashok Naik	71,198	39.37%	▼0.88
INC	Dr. Sreenivas Kariyanna	18,335	10.14%	▼9.30
AAP	Manjunatha. S. S	1,715	0.95%	New
NOTA	None of the above	1,053	0.58%	▼0.19
Margin of victory		15,142	8.37%	▲6.18
Turnout		180,952	85.17%	▲3.69
Total valid votes		180,848		
Registered electors		212,458		▲0.43
JD(S) gain from BJP		Swing	▲7.49	

=== Assembly Election 2018 ===
2018 Karnataka Legislative Assembly election : Shimoga Rural
Party	Candidate	Votes	%	±%
BJP	K. B. Ashok Naik	69,326	40.25%	▲31.59
JD(S)	Sharada Puryanaik	65,549	38.06%	▲4.18
INC	Dr. Sreenivas Kariyanna	33,493	19.44%	▼5.39
NOTA	None of the above	1,328	0.77%	New
Margin of victory		3,777	2.19%	▼4.85
Turnout		172,362	81.48%	▲4.38
Total valid votes		172,248		
Registered electors		211,546		▲13.72
BJP gain from JD(S)		Swing	▲6.37	

=== Assembly Election 2013 ===
2013 Karnataka Legislative Assembly election : Shimoga Rural
Party	Candidate	Votes	%	±%
JD(S)	Sharada Puryanaik	48,639	33.88%	▲12.66
KJP	G. Basavannappa	38,530	26.84%	New
INC	Kariyanna	35,640	24.83%	▼1.22
BJP	K. G. Kumara Swamy	12,435	8.66%	▼36.72
Independent	Shivarudraiah Swamy	1,874	1.31%	New
Independent	V. Bhagavan	1,499	1.04%	New
JD(U)	L. Chandra Naik	1,034	0.72%	New
Independent	N. T. Shivamurthy	1,005	0.70%	New
Margin of victory		10,109	7.04%	▼12.28
Turnout		143,425	77.10%	▲6.79
Total valid votes		143,556		
Registered electors		186,023		▲4.13
JD(S) gain from BJP		Swing	▼11.50	

=== Assembly Election 2008 ===
2008 Karnataka Legislative Assembly election : Shimoga Rural
Party	Candidate	Votes	%	±%
BJP	K. G. Kumara Swamy	56,979	45.38%	New
INC	Kariyanna	32,714	26.05%	New
JD(S)	Sharada Puryanaik	26,644	21.22%	New
Independent	Halappa. A. K	2,441	1.94%	New
BSP	M. Gurumurthy	2,371	1.89%	New
SP	Shanthaveera Naik	1,770	1.41%	New
Swarna Yuga Party	H. Kuberappa	1,541	1.23%	New
Margin of victory		24,265	19.32%	
Turnout		125,601	70.31%	
Total valid votes		125,567		
Registered electors		178,637		
BJP win (new seat)				

== See also ==
- List of constituencies of the Karnataka Legislative Assembly
- Shimoga district
