= Basanagouda Daddal =

Indian politician (born 1972)

Basanagouda Daddal (born 4 April 1972) is an Indian politician from Karnataka. He is a member of the Karnataka Legislative Assembly from Raichur Rural Assembly constituency which is reserved for ST community in Raichur district. He represents Indian National Congress Party and won the 2023 Karnataka Legislative Assembly election.

Basanagouda Daddal was appointed Chairperson for Scheduled Tribes Development Corporation on 26 January 2024.

== Early life and education ==
Daddal is from Raichur. His father Tippanna is a farmer. He completed his Pre University Course in 2013 from Sharada Vidyaniketana through Open University, Manvi.

== Career ==
Daddal won from Raichur Rural Assembly constituency representing Indian National Congress in the 2023 Karnataka Legislative Assembly election. He polled 89,140 votes and defeated his nearest rival, Tipparaju Hawaldar of Bharatiya Janata Party, by a margin of 13,857 votes. Earlier, he won the 2018 Karnataka Legislative Assembly election also on Indian National Congress ticket from the same seat and defeated the same opponent, Tipparaju Hawaldar of BJP by a margin of 9,964 votes.
