= Sharada Puryanaik =

Indian politician

Sharada Puryanaik (born 22 November 1971) is an Indian politician from Karnataka. She is a member of Karnataka Legislative Assembly representing Janata Dal (Secular) from Shimoga Rural. She was elected in the 2023 Karnataka Legislative Assembly election.

== Early life and career ==
Puryanaik is from Shikaripura, Shivamogga district, Karnataka. She is the wife of late Poorya Naik. She passed Class10 examinations and then did her first year pre university course at DVS Senior College, Shivamogga during 1987-88. Later, she discontinued her studies. She runs her own business, a petrol bunk.

== Career ==
Puryanaik was first elected as an MLA winning the 2013 Karnataka Legislative Assembly election from Shimoga Rural Assembly constituency representing the Janata Dal (Secular). She polled 48,639 votes and defeated her nearest rival, G. Basavannappa of the Karnataka Janata Paksha, by a margin of 10,109 votes. She lost the next election in the 2018 Karnataka Legislative Assembly election to K. B. Ashok Naik of the Bharatiya Janata Party by a margin of 3,777 votes. However, she defeated Ashok Naik in the 2023 Karnataka Legislative Assembly election and regained the seat for the Janata Dal (S). She polled 86,340 votes and defeated Naik by 15,142 votes.

In July 2023, she was elected as the deputy legislature party leader of Janata Dal (S) in the house with H. D. Kumaraswamy being the Legislature party leader. This is the first time JD(S) party elected a woman to this post.
