= Karnataka Legislative Assembly =

Lower house of the state legislature of Karnataka

Karnataka Legislative Assembly Karnāṭaka Vidhānasabhe
- 16th Karnataka Assembly
- Emblem of Karnataka

Type
- Type: Lower house of the Karnataka Legislature
- Term limits: 5 years

History
- Founded: 19 December 1956 (69 years ago)
- Preceded by: Mysore Legislative Assembly

Leadership
- Speaker: G. S. Patil, INC since 14 August 2026
- Deputy Speaker: Mankala Vaidya, INC since 17 August 2026
- Leader of the House (Chief Minister): D. K. Shivakumar, INC since 3 June 2026
- Deputy Leader of the House (Deputy Chief Minister): G. Parameshwara, INC since 3 June 2026
- Leader of the Opposition: R. Ashoka, BJP since 17 November 2023
- Deputy Leader of the Opposition: Arvind Bellad, BJP since 25 December 2023

Structure
- Seats: 224
- Political groups: Government (141) INDIA(141): INC (137); SKP (1); IND (3); Opposition (82) NDA (81): BJP (63); JD(S) (18); Other: IND (1); Vacant (1): Vacant (1)
- Length of term: 2023 – 2028

Elections
- Voting system: First past the post
- First election: 26 March 1952
- Last election: 10 May 2023
- Next election: May 2028

Meeting place
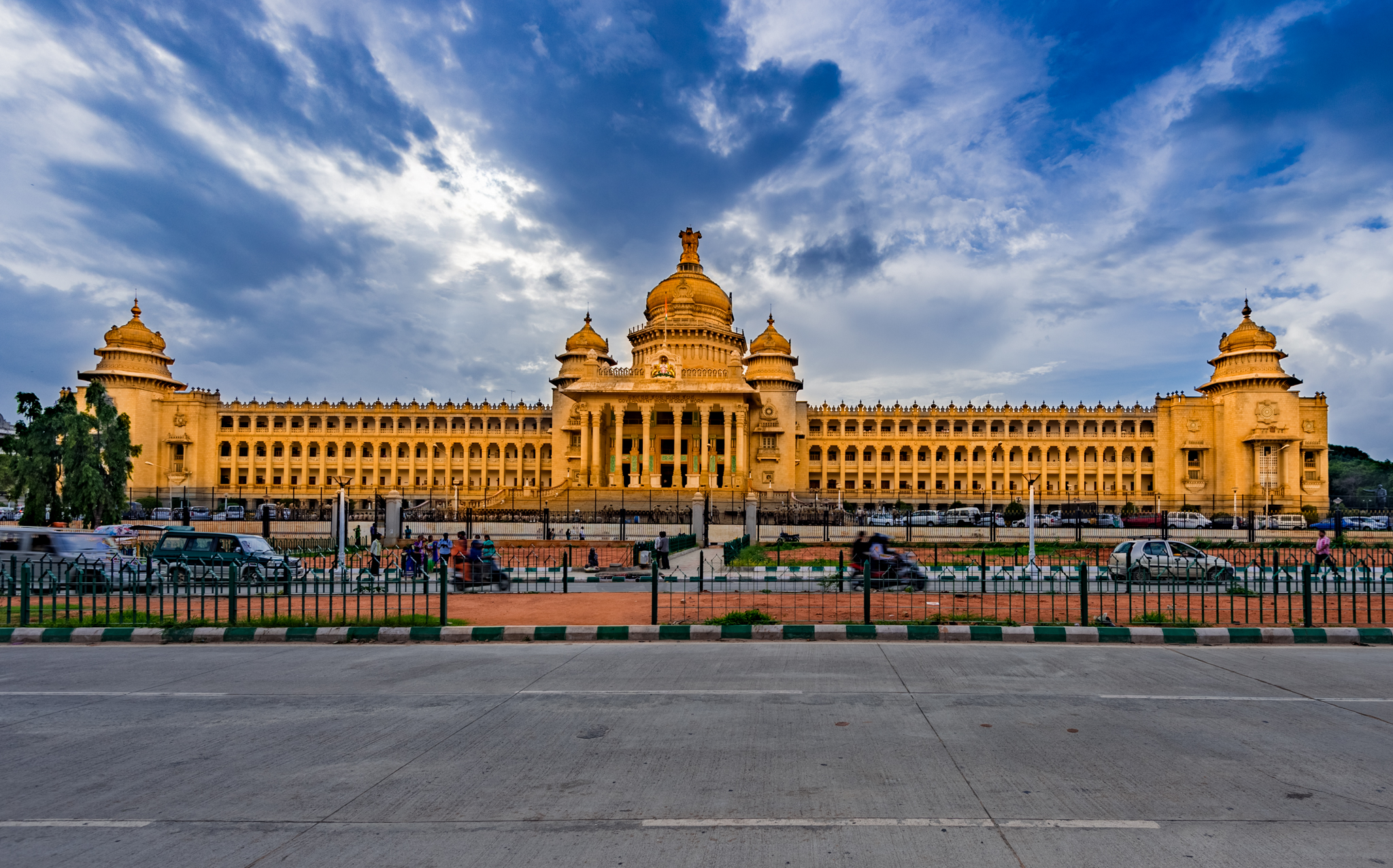
- Vidhana Soudha, Bengaluru, Karnataka, India.
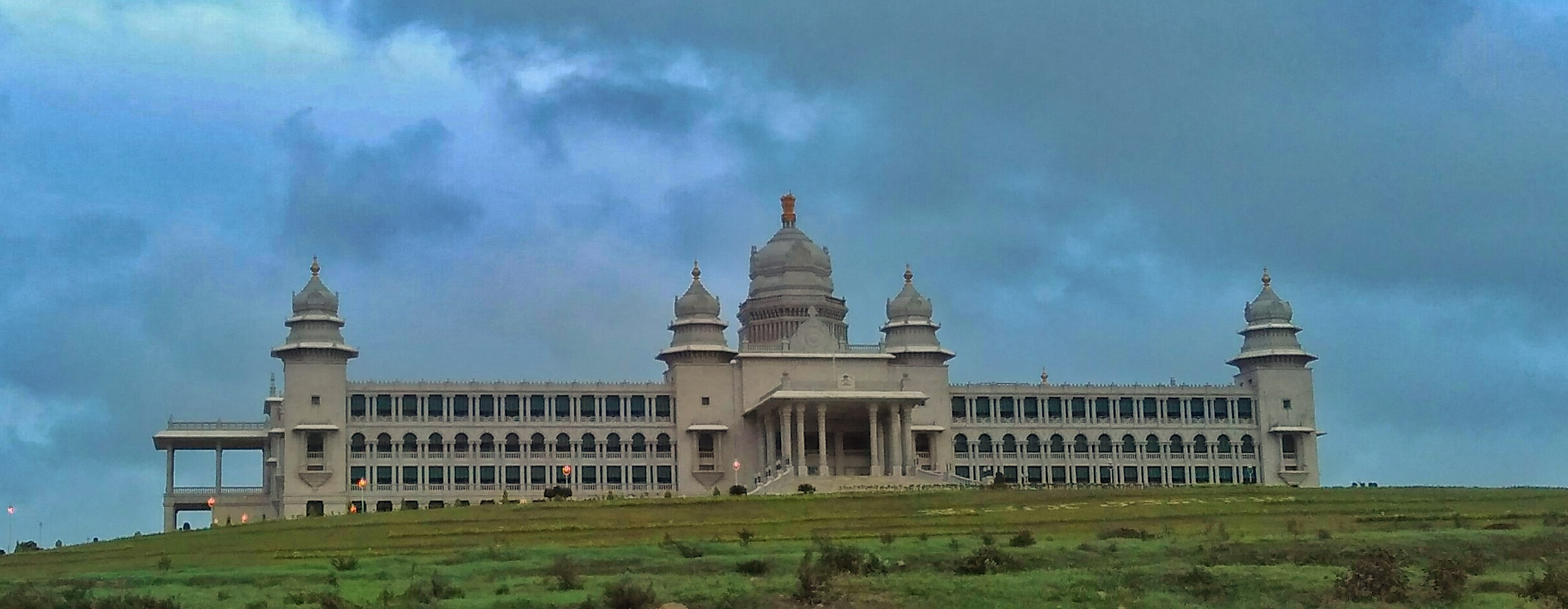
- Suvarna Vidhana Soudha, Belagavi, Karnataka, India (Winter session)

Website
- Karnataka Legislative Assembly

Footnotes
- The Assembly was established in 1881 for the Princely State of Mysore. The princely state was merged with the Dominion of India and became Mysore State in 1947; Mysore State was re-organized to its current territorial state in 1956 and renamed as Karnataka on 1 November 1973.

The Karnataka Legislative Assembly is the lower house of the bicameral legislature of the southern Indian state of Karnataka. Karnataka is one of the six states in India where the state legislature is bicameral, comprising two houses: the Vidhan Sabha (lower house) and the Vidhan Parishad (upper house).

There are 224 Members of the Legislative Assembly (MLAs) and are directly elected through adult franchise. Karnataka is thus divided into 224 constituencies to elect members to the Assembly, each constituency electing one member. The assembly is elected using the simple plurality or "first past the post" electoral system. The elections are conducted by the Election Commission of India.

== History ==
Mysore Representative Assembly was constituted in 1881 by Maharaja Chamaraja Wadiyar X, the first of its kind in princely India. It formed the Kingdom's sole unicameral legislature until when, in 1907, an upper house was carved out of it to form the Mysore Legislative Council, resulting in the Assembly's functioning as the lower house.

On 16 December 1949, Maharaja Jayachamaraja Wadiyar dissolved the sitting representative and legislative assemblies. A constituent assembly that was constituted in 1947 became the provisional assembly of Mysore until elections were held in 1952.

On Wednesday, 18 June 1952, at 11:00 am, the first session of the newly-formed Mysore Legislative Assembly was held at a conference hall in the old Public Offices building (the Attara Kacheri, the current seat of the Karnataka High Court) in Bangalore. The first assembly in Mysore formed under the Constitution of India, it had 99 elected members and one nominated member. In the first sitting of the assembly, V. Venkatappa, the honorary speaker, administered the oath of office to the members (including the then Chief Minister Kengal Hanumanthaiah), and then conducted an election to the post of speaker, which was contested by socialist leader Shantaveri Gopalagowda and H. Siddaiah. With 74 votes, the latter won, and Hanumanthaiah delivered a speech.

With the formation of Andhra state in 1953, parts of Bellary district from Madras State were added to Mysore state and the strength of the Assembly increased by five members. After the re-organization of the state of Mysore came into being on 1 November 1956 with four districts from the former Bombay state, three districts of Hyderabad state, a district, and taluk of the old Madras state of Coorg, and the princely state of Mysore. The state was renamed Karnataka in 1973.

The first sitting of the new assembly was held on 19 December 1956 in the newly built Vidhana Soudha. The strength of the assembly, which was 208 in 1957 increased to 216 in 1967 and to 224 plus a nominated member in 1978.

As of 2026, the only woman to have held the post of Speaker was K. S. Nagarathanamma, who served from 24 March 1972 to 3 March 1978.

The Budget Session and the Monsoon Session of the Legislature are held in Vidhana Soudha, Bengaluru. The Winter Session of the Legislature is held in Suvarna Vidhana Soudha in Belagavi.

Assembly	From	To	Status	Duration	Chief Minister(s)
First Assembly	18 June 1952	1 April 1957	Completed	4 years, 287 days	Kengal Hanumanthaiah; Kadidal Manjappa; S. Nijalingappa
Second Assembly	19 April 1957	1 March 1962	Completed	4 years, 316 days	S. Nijalingappa; B.D. Jatti
Third Assembly	15 March 1962	28 Feb 1967	Completed	4 years, 350 days	S. R. Kanthi; S. Nijalingappa
Fourth Assembly (Note: Fifth Assembly Term of the Assembly was extended by One year (to Six years) by the 42nd Constitution Amendment Act)	15 March 1967	14 April 1971	Completed	4 years, 30 days	S. Nijalingappa; Veerendra Patil
Fifth Assembly	24 March 1972	31 Dec 1977	Dissolved	5 years, 282 days	D. Devaraj Urs
Sixth Assembly	17 March 1978	8 June 1983	Dissolved	5 years, 83 days	D. Devaraj Urs; R. Gundu Rao
Seventh Assembly	24 July 1983	2 January 1985	Dissolved	1 year, 162 days	Ramakrishna Hegde
Eighth Assembly	18 March 1985	21 April 1989	Dissolved	4 years, 34 days	Ramakrishna Hegde; S. R. Bommai
Ninth Assembly	18 Dec 1989	20 Sept 1994	Dissolved	4 years, 276 days	Veerendra Patil; S. Bangarappa; M. Veerappa Moily
Tenth Assembly	25 Dec 1994	22 July 1999	Dissolved	4 years, 209 days	H. D. Deve Gowda; J. H. Patel
Eleventh Assembly	25 Oct 1999	28 May 2004	Completed	4 years, 216 days	S. M. Krishna
Twelfth Assembly	28 May 2004	19 Nov 2007	Dissolved	3 years, 175 days	Dharam Singh; H. D. Kumaraswamy; B. S. Yeddyurappa
Thirteenth Assembly	30 May 2008	5 May 2013	Completed	4 years, 340 days	B. S. Yeddyurappa; D. V. Sadananda Gowda; Jagadish Shettar
Fourteenth Assembly	13 May 2013	15 May 2018	Completed	5 years, 2 days	Siddaramaiah
Fifteenth Assembly	16 May 2018	13 May 2023	Completed	4 years, 362 days	B. S. Yeddyurappa; H. D. Kumaraswamy; B. S. Yeddyurappa; Basavaraj Bommai
Sixteenth Assembly	20 May 2023	Present	Incumbent	3 years, 181 days	Siddaramaiah; D. K. Shivakumar

== Composition ==
Alliance	Political party	No. of MLAs (Note: Figures reflect party position as of June 2026, accounting for by-elections, expulsions, and deaths during the term.)	Leader of the party in the Assembly
Government; INDIA; Seats: 140	Indian National Congress	136	D. K. Shivakumar (Chief Minister)
Government; INDIA; Seats: 140	Sarvodaya Karnataka Paksha	1	Darshan Puttannaiah
Government; INDIA; Seats: 140	Independent	3	Latha Mallikarjun; K. H. Puttaswamy Gowda; S. T. Somashekhar
Opposition; NDA; Seats: 81	Bharatiya Janata Party	63	R. Ashoka
Opposition; NDA; Seats: 81	Janata Dal (Secular)	18	C. B. Suresh Babu
Others; Seats: 1	Independent	1	Basangouda Patil Yatnal
Vacant; Seats: 2	Dharwad; Hiriyur	2	—N/a
Total		224	

== Members of Legislative Assembly ==
District	No.	Constituency	Name	Party	Remarks
Belagavi	1	Nippani	Shashikala Jolle	BJP	
Belagavi	2	Chikkodi-Sadalga	Ganesh Hukkeri	INC	
Belagavi	3	Athani	Laxman Savadi	INC	
Belagavi	4	Kagwad	Raju Kage	INC	
Belagavi	5	Kudachi (SC)	Mahendra Kallappa Tammannavar	INC	
Belagavi	6	Raibag (SC)	Duryodhan Aihole	BJP	
Belagavi	7	Hukkeri	Nikhil Katti	BJP	
Belagavi	8	Arabhavi	Balachandra Jarkiholi	BJP	
Belagavi	9	Gokak	Ramesh Jarkiholi	BJP	
Belagavi	10	Yemkanmardi (ST)	Satish Jarkiholi	INC	Cabinet Minister (Shivakumar ministry)
Belagavi	11	Belgaum Uttar	Asif Sait	INC	
Belagavi	12	Belgaum Dakshin	Abhay Patil	BJP	
Belagavi	13	Belgaum Rural	Lakshmi Hebbalkar	INC	Cabinet Minister (Second Siddaramaiah ministry)
Belagavi	14	Khanapur	Vithal Halagekar	BJP	
Belagavi	15	Kittur	Babasaheb Devanagouda Patil	INC	
Belagavi	16	Bailhongal	Mahantesh Koujalagi	INC	
Belagavi	17	Saundatti Yellamma	Vishwas Vasant Vaidya	INC	
Belagavi	18	Ramdurg	Ashok Pattan	INC	
Bagalkot	19	Mudhol (SC)	R. B. Timmapur	INC	
Bagalkot	20	Terdal	Siddu Savadi	BJP	
Bagalkot	21	Jamkhandi	Jagadish Gudagunti	BJP	
Bagalkot	22	Bilgi	J. T. Patil	INC	
Bagalkot	23	Badami	Bhimsen Chimmanakatti	INC	
Bagalkot	24	Bagalkot	H. Y. Meti	INC	Died on 4 November 2025
Bagalkot	24	Bagalkot	U.H. Meti	INC	Elected in bypoll
Bagalkot	25	Hungund	Vijayanand Kashappanavar	INC	
Vijayapura	26	Muddebihal	C. S. Nadagouda	INC	
Vijayapura	27	Devar Hippargi	Rajugouda Patil	JD(S)	
Vijayapura	28	Basavana Bagevadi	Shivanand Patil	INC	
Vijayapura	29	Babaleshwar	M. B. Patil	INC	Cabinet Minister (Shivakumar ministry)
Vijayapura	30	Bijapur City	Basangouda Patil Yatnal	IND	Expelled from BJP on 26 March 2025
Vijayapura	31	Nagathan (SC)	Katakadond Vittal Dondiba	INC	
Vijayapura	32	Indi	Yashavant Rayagoud Patil	INC	
Vijayapura	33	Sindagi	Ashok M. Managuli	INC	
Kalaburagi	34	Afzalpur	M. Y. Patil	INC	
Kalaburagi	35	Jevargi	Ajay Singh	INC	
Yadgir	36	Shorapur (ST)	Raja Venkatappa Naik	INC	Died on 25 February 2024
Yadgir	36	Shorapur (ST)	Raja Venugopal Naik	INC	Elected on 4 June 2024
Yadgir	37	Shahapur	Sharanabasappa Darshanapur	INC	
Yadgir	38	Yadgir	Channareddy Patil Tunnur	INC	
Yadgir	39	Gurmitkal	Sharanagouda Kandakur	JD(S)	
Kalaburagi	40	Chittapur (SC)	Priyank Kharge	INC	Cabinet Minister (Shivakumar ministry)
Kalaburagi	41	Sedam	Sharan Prakash Patil	INC	Cabinet Minister (Shivakumar ministry)
Kalaburagi	42	Chincholi (SC)	Avinash Jadhav	BJP	
Kalaburagi	43	Gulbarga Rural (SC)	Basawaraj Mattimud	BJP	
Kalaburagi	44	Gulbarga Dakshin	Allamprabhu Patil	INC	
Kalaburagi	45	Gulbarga Uttar	Kaneez Fathima	INC	
Kalaburagi	46	Aland	B. R. Patil	INC	
Bidar	47	Basavakalyan	Sharanu Salagar	BJP	
Bidar	48	Humnabad	Siddu Patil	BJP	
Bidar	49	Bidar South	Shailendra Bedale	BJP	
Bidar	50	Bidar	Rahim Khan	INC	
Bidar	51	Bhalki	Eshwara Khandre	INC	Cabinet Minister (Shivakumar ministry)
Bidar	52	Aurad (SC)	Prabhu Chauhan	BJP	
Raichur	53	Raichur Rural (ST)	Basanagouda Daddal	INC	
Raichur	54	Raichur	Dr Shivaraj Patil	BJP	
Raichur	55	Manvi (ST)	G. Hampayya Nayak	INC	
Raichur	56	Devadurga (ST)	Karemma	JD(S)	
Raichur	57	Lingsugur (SC)	Manappa D. Vajjal	BJP	
Raichur	58	Sindhanur	Hampanagouda Badarli	INC	
Raichur	59	Maski (ST)	Basanagouda Turvihal	INC	
Koppal	60	Kushtagi	Doddanagouda Hanamagouda Patil	BJP	
Koppal	61	Kanakagiri (SC)	Tangadagi Shivaraj Sangappa	INC	
Koppal	62	Gangawati	G. Janardhana Reddy	BJP	KRPP merges with BJP
Koppal	63	Yelburga	Basavaraj Rayareddy	INC	
Koppal	64	Koppal	K. Raghavendra Hitnal	INC	
Gadag	65	Shirahatti (SC)	Chandru Lamani	BJP	
Gadag	66	Gadag	H. K. Patil	INC	
Gadag	67	Ron	Gurupadagouda Sanganagouda Patil	INC	
Gadag	68	Nargund	C. C. Patil	BJP	
Dharwad	69	Navalgund	Ningaraddi Hanamaraddi Konaraddi	INC	
Dharwad	70	Kundgol	M. R. Patil	BJP	
Dharwad	71	Dharwad	Vinay Kulkarni	INC	
Dharwad	72	Hubli-Dharwad East (SC)	Abbayya Prasad	INC	
Dharwad	73	Hubli-Dharwad Central	Mahesh Tenginakai	BJP	
Dharwad	74	Hubli-Dharwad West	Arvind Bellad	BJP	Deputy Leader of the Opposition
Dharwad	75	Kalghatgi	Santosh Lad	INC	
Uttara Kannada	76	Haliyal	R. V. Deshpande	INC	
Uttara Kannada	77	Karwar	Satish Krishna Sail	INC	
Uttara Kannada	78	Kumta	Dinakar Keshav Shetty	BJP	
Uttara Kannada	79	Bhatkal	Mankala Vaidya	INC	
Uttara Kannada	80	Sirsi	Bhimanna T. Naik	INC	
Uttara Kannada	81	Yellapur	Arbail Hebbar Shivaram	IND	Expelled from Bharatiya Janata Party
Haveri	82	Hangal	Srinivas Mane	INC	
Haveri	83	Shiggaon	Basavaraj Bommai	BJP	Elected to Lok Sabha on 4 June 2024
Haveri	83	Shiggaon	Pathan Yasir Ahmed Khan	INC	Elected on 23 November 2024
Haveri	84	Haveri (SC)	Rudrappa Manappa Lamani	INC	Deputy Speaker
Haveri	85	Byadgi	Basavaraj Neelappa Shivannanavar	INC	
Haveri	86	Hirekerur	U. B. Banakar	INC	
Haveri	87	Ranebennur	Prakash Koliwad	INC	
Vijayanagara	88	Hoovina Hadagali (SC)	Krishna Nayaka	BJP	
Vijayanagara	89	Hagaribommanahalli (SC)	K. Nemaraja Naik	JD(S)	
Vijayanagara	90	Vijayanagara	H. R. Gaviyappa	INC	
Ballari	91	Kampli (ST)	J. N. Ganesh	INC	
Ballari	92	Siruguppa (ST)	B. M. Nagaraja	INC	
Ballari	93	Bellary (ST)	B Nagendra	INC	Cabinet Minister (Second Siddaramaiah ministry)
Ballari	94	Bellary City	Nara Bharath Reddy	INC	
Ballari	95	Sandur (ST)	E. Tukaram	INC	Elected to Lok Sabha on 4 June 2024
Ballari	95	Sandur (ST)	E. Annapoorna	INC	Elected on 23 November 2024
Vijayanagara	96	Kudligi (ST)	N. T. Srinivas	INC	
Chitradurga	97	Molakalmuru (ST)	N. Y. Gopalakrishna	INC	
Chitradurga	98	Challakere (ST)	T. Raghumurthy	INC	
Chitradurga	99	Chitradurga	K. C. Veerendra Puppy	INC	
Chitradurga	100	Hiriyur	D. Sudhakar	INC	Died on 10 May 2026
Chitradurga	100	Hiriyur	Vacant		
Chitradurga	101	Hosadurga	B. G. Govindappa	INC	
Chitradurga	102	Holalkere (SC)	M. Chandrappa	BJP	
Davanagere	103	Jagalur (ST)	B. Devendrappa	INC	
Vijayanagara	104	Harapanahalli	Latha Mallikarjun	IND	Joined Congress
Davanagere	105	Harihar	B. P. Harish	BJP	
Davanagere	106	Davanagere North	S. S. Mallikarjun	INC	
Davanagere	107	Davanagere South	Shamanur Shivashankarappa	INC	Died on 14 December 2025
Davanagere	107	Davanagere South	Samarth Shamanur Mallikarjun	INC	Elected in bypoll
Davanagere	108	Mayakonda (SC)	K. S. Basavanthappa	INC	
Davanagere	109	Channagiri	Basavaraju V. Shivaganga	INC	
Davanagere	110	Honnali	A. D. G. Shanthana Gowda	INC	
Shimoga	111	Shimoga Rural (SC)	Sharada Puryanaik	JD(S)	
Shimoga	112	Bhadravati	B. K. Sangameshwara	INC	
Shimoga	113	Shimoga	Channabasappa	BJP	
Shimoga	114	Tirthahalli	Araga Jnanendra	BJP	
Shimoga	115	Shikaripura	B. Y. Vijayendra	BJP	
Shimoga	116	Sorab	Madhu Bangarappa	INC	
Shimoga	117	Sagar	Gopala Krishna Beluru	INC	
Udupi	118	Byndoor	Gururaj Shetty Gantihole	BJP	
Udupi	119	Kundapura	A. Kiran Kumar Kodgi	BJP	
Udupi	120	Udupi	Yashpal A. Suvarna	BJP	
Udupi	121	Kapu	Gurme Suresh Shetty	BJP	
Udupi	122	Karkala	V. Sunil Kumar	BJP	
Chikmagalur	123	Sringeri	T. D. Rajegowda	INC	
Chikmagalur	124	Mudigere (SC)	Nayana Motamma	INC	
Chikmagalur	125	Chikmagalur	H. D. Thammaiah	INC	
Chikmagalur	126	Tarikere	G. H. Srinivasa	INC	
Chikmagalur	127	Kadur	K. S. Anand	INC	
Tumakuru	128	Chiknayakanhalli	C. B. Suresh Babu	JD(S)	
Tumakuru	129	Tiptur	K. Shadakshari	INC	
Tumakuru	130	Turuvekere	M. T. Krishnappa	JD(S)	
Tumakuru	131	Kunigal	H. D. Ranganath	INC	
Tumakuru	132	Tumkur City	G. B. Jyothi Ganesh	BJP	
Tumakuru	133	Tumkur Rural	B. Suresh Gowda	BJP	
Tumakuru	134	Koratagere (SC)	G. Parameshwara	INC	Deputy Chief Minister
Tumakuru	135	Gubbi	S. R. Srinivas	INC	
Tumakuru	136	Sira	T. B. Jayachandra	INC	
Tumakuru	137	Pavagada (SC)	H. V. Venkatesh	INC	
Tumakuru	138	Madhugiri	K. N. Rajanna	INC	
Chikkaballapura	139	Gauribidanur	K. Puttaswamy Gowda	IND	
Chikkaballapura	140	Bagepalli	S. N. Subbareddy	INC	
Chikkaballapura	141	Chikkaballapur	Pradeep Eshwar	INC	
Chikkaballapura	142	Sidlaghatta	B. N. Ravi Kumar	JD(S)	
Chikkaballapura	143	Chintamani	M. C. Sudhakar	INC	Cabinet Minister (Second Siddaramaiah ministry)
Kolar	144	Srinivaspur	G. K. Venkatashiva Reddy	JD(S)	
Kolar	145	Mulbagal (SC)	Samruddhi V. Manjunath	JD(S)	
Kolar	146	Kolar Gold Field (SC)	M. Roopakala	INC	
Kolar	147	Bangarapet (SC)	S. N. Narayanaswamy	INC	
Kolar	148	Kolar	Kothur G. Manjunath	INC	
Kolar	149	Malur	K. Y. Nanjegowda	INC	
Bangalore Urban	150	Yelahanka	S. R. Vishwanath	BJP	
Bangalore Urban	151	Krishnarajapuram	B.A. Basavaraja	BJP	
Bangalore Urban	152	Byatarayanapura	Krishna Byregowda	INC	Cabinet Minister (Shivakumar ministry)
Bangalore Urban	153	Yeshwantpur	S.T. Somashekar	IND	Expelled from Bharatiya Janata Party
Bangalore Urban	154	Rajarajeshwarinagar	Munirathna	BJP	
Bangalore Urban	155	Dasarahalli	S. Muniraju	BJP	
Bangalore Urban	156	Mahalakshmi Layout	K. Gopalaiah	BJP	
Bangalore Urban	157	Malleshwaram	C.N. Ashwath Narayan	BJP	
Bangalore Urban	158	Hebbal	Suresha B.S.	INC	Cabinet Minister (Shivakumar ministry)
Bangalore Urban	159	Pulakeshinagar (SC)	A.C. Srinivasa	INC	
Bangalore Urban	160	Sarvagnanagar	K.J. George	INC	Cabinet Minister (Shivakumar ministry)
Bangalore Urban	161	C. V. Raman Nagar (SC)	S. Raghu	BJP	
Bangalore Urban	162	Shivajinagar	Rizwan Arshad	INC	
Bangalore Urban	163	Shanti Nagar	N.A. Haris	INC	
Bangalore Urban	164	Gandhi Nagar	Dinesh Gundu Rao	INC	
Bangalore Urban	165	Rajaji Nagar	S. Suresh Kumar	BJP	
Bangalore Urban	166	Govindraj Nagar	Priya Krishna	INC	
Bangalore Urban	167	Vijay Nagar	M. Krishnappa	INC	
Bangalore Urban	168	Chamrajpet	B.Z. Zameer Ahmed Khan	INC	Cabinet Minister (Second Siddaramaiah ministry)
Bangalore Urban	169	Chickpet	Uday B. Garudachar	BJP	
Bangalore Urban	170	Basavanagudi	Ravi Subramanya L.A.	BJP	
Bangalore Urban	171	Padmanabhanagar	R. Ashoka	BJP	Leader of the Opposition
Bangalore Urban	172	B.T.M. Layout	Ramalinga Reddy	INC	Cabinet Minister (Shivakumar ministry)
Bangalore Urban	173	Jayanagar	C. K. Ramamurthy	BJP	
Bangalore Urban	174	Mahadevapura (SC)	Manjula S.	BJP	
Bangalore Urban	175	Bommanahalli	Satish Reddy M.	BJP	
Bangalore Urban	176	Bangalore South	M. Krishnappa	BJP	
Bangalore Urban	177	Anekal (SC)	B. Shivanna	INC	
Bangalore Rural	178	Hoskote	Sharath Kumar Bache Gowda	INC	
Bangalore Rural	179	Devanahalli (SC)	K. H. Muniyappa	INC	Cabinet Minister (Shivakumar ministry)
Bangalore Rural	180	Doddaballapur	Dheeraj Muniraj	BJP	
Bangalore Rural	181	Nelamangala (SC)	N. Shreenivasaiah	INC	
Ramanagara	182	Magadi	H. C. Balakrishna	INC	
Ramanagara	183	Ramanagara	H. A. Iqbal Hussain	INC	
Ramanagara	184	Kanakapura	D.K. Shivakumar	INC	Chief Minister
Ramanagara	185	Channapatna	H. D. Kumaraswamy	JD(S)	Elected to Lok Sabha on 4 June 2024
Ramanagara	185	Channapatna	C. P. Yogeshwar	INC	Elected on 23 November 2024
Mandya	186	Malavalli (SC)	P. M. Narendraswamy	INC	
Mandya	187	Maddur	K. M. Udaya	INC	
Mandya	188	Melukote	Darshan Puttannaiah	SKP	
Mandya	189	Mandya	Ravikumar Gowda	INC	
Mandya	190	Shrirangapattana	A. B. Ramesha Bandisiddegowda	INC	
Mandya	191	Nagamangala	N. Chaluvaraya Swamy	INC	
Mandya	192	Krishnarajapet	H. T. Manju	JD(S)	
Hassan	193	Shravanabelagola	C. N. Balakrishna	JD(S)	
Hassan	194	Arsikere	K. M. Shivalinge Gowda	INC	
Hassan	195	Belur	H. K. Suresh	BJP	
Hassan	196	Hassan	Swaroop Prakash	JD(S)	
Hassan	197	Holenarasipur	H. D. Revanna	JD(S)	
Hassan	198	Arkalgud	A. Manju	JD(S)	
Hassan	199	Sakleshpur (SC)	Cement Manju	BJP	
Dakshina Kannada	200	Belthangady	Harish Poonja	BJP	
Dakshina Kannada	201	Moodabidri	Umanatha Kotian	BJP	
Dakshina Kannada	202	Mangalore City North	Y. Bharath Shetty	BJP	
Dakshina Kannada	203	Mangalore City South	D. Vedavyasa Kamath	BJP	
Dakshina Kannada	204	Mangalore	U. T. Khader	INC	Former Speaker; Cabinet Minister (Shivakumar ministry)
Dakshina Kannada	205	Bantval	U. Rajesh Naik	BJP	
Dakshina Kannada	206	Puttur	Ashok Kumar Rai	INC	
Dakshina Kannada	207	Sullia (SC)	Bhagirathi Murulya	BJP	
Kodagu	208	Madikeri	Mantar Gowda	INC	
Kodagu	209	Virajpet	A. S. Ponnanna	INC	
Mysore	210	Periyapatna	K. Venkatesh	INC	
Mysore	211	Krishnarajanagara	D. Ravishankar	INC	
Mysore	212	Hunsur	G. D. Harish Gowda	JD(S)	
Mysore	213	Heggadadevankote (ST)	Anil Chikkamadhu	INC	
Mysore	214	Nanjangud (SC)	Darshan Dhruvanarayana	INC	
Mysore	215	Chamundeshwari	G. T. Devegowda	JD(S)	
Mysore	216	Krishnaraja	T. S. Srivatsa	BJP	
Mysore	217	Chamaraja	K. Harish Gowda	INC	
Mysore	218	Narasimharaja	Tanveer Sait	INC	
Mysore	219	Varuna	Siddaramaiah	INC	Former Chief Minister (2023–2026)
Mysore	220	T. Narasipur (SC)	H. C. Mahadevappa	INC	
Chamarajanagar	221	Hanur	M. R. Manjunath	JD(S)	
Chamarajanagar	222	Kollegal (SC)	A. R. Krishnamurthy	INC	
Chamarajanagar	223	Chamarajanagar	C. Puttarangashetty	INC	
Chamarajanagar	224	Gundlupet	H M Ganesh Prasad	INC	

== See also ==
- Vidhana Soudha
- Government of Karnataka
- Karnataka Legislative Council
- List of chief ministers of Karnataka
- List of speakers of the Karnataka Legislative Assembly
