= B. Devendrappa =

Indian musician

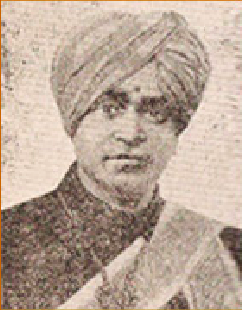
Devendrappa

B. Devendrappa (1899–1986), known as the Palace Vidwan of Mysore, was a notable musician in the court of Jayachamaraja Wodeyar. He was the son of vocalist B S Ramayya. He was born in the village of Ayanur of Shimoga district, in present-day Karnataka.

He was the recipient of various awards including the Central Sangeet Natak Akademi Award in 1963 for Karnatik vocal music, and Sangeetha Kalarathna award in 1971.

He was awarded a doctorate. He died in 1986 in Mysore.

== Songs ==
One of his songs is Song Rara Enipilachitehy.
