= Bhimanagouda Patil =

Indian politician (born 1972)

Bhimanagouda Basanagouda Patil (born 1972), alias Rajugouda, is an Indian politician from Karnataka. He is an MLA from Devar Hippargi Assembly constituency in Vijayapura district. He won the 2023 Karnataka Legislative Assembly election representing Janata Dal (Secular) Party.

== Early life and education ==
Patil is from Devara Hippargi. His father Basanagouda Patil is a farmer. He completed his B.Sc. in agriculture in 1996 at Krishi University, Dharwad.

== Career ==
Patil won from Devar Hippargi Assembly constituency representing Bharatiya Janata Party in the 2023 Karnataka Legislative Assembly election. He polled 65,952 votes and defeated his nearest rival, Somanagouda Patil of Bharatiya Janata Party, by a margin of 20,175 votes. He lost the 2018 Karnataka Legislative Assembly election by 3,353 votes to Somanagouda of BJP.
