= Darshan Puttannaiah =

Indian politician

Member of the Karnataka Legislative Assembly
- Incumbent
- Assumed office 13 May 2023
- Preceded by: C. S. Puttaraju
- Constituency: Melukote

Personal details
- Party: Sarvodaya Karnataka Paksha
- Other political affiliations: Swaraj Abhiyan (March 2017-January 2019)
- Parent(s): K. S. Puttannaiah (father), Suneetha Puttannaiah (mother)
- Education: Bachelor of Technology from JSS Science and Technology University

Darshan Puttannaiah (born 1977) is an Indian politician from Karnataka. He is a Member of the Karnataka Legislative Assembly from Melukote Assembly constituency since 2023 representing the Sarvodaya Karnataka Paksha.

== Early life and education ==
Puttannaiah was born to K. S. Puttannaiah and Suneetha Puttannaiah in Mandya district of Karnataka. He completed his Bachelor of Technology from the Sri Jayachamarajendra College of Engineering, Mysore in the year 2001. He was a techie settled in US, who returned to politics in India after the death of his father before the 2018 Assembly elections.

== Career ==
He is the president of Sarvodaya Karnataka Paksha after its renewal in 2023. He is the only son of late K. S. Puttannaiah.

He was supported by the Indian National Congress, who did not field a candidate in the 2023 Assembly elections from Melukote.

He had fought 2018 Karnataka Legislative Assembly election from the Melukote Assembly constituency representing Yogendra Yadav's Swaraj India but lost to C. S. Puttaraju of Janata Dal (Secular).

== Electoral History ==
=== Legislative Assembly ===
Year	Constituency	Party	Votes	%	Opponent	Party	Votes	%	Result	Margin	%
2023	Melukote	SKP	91,151	49.57	C. S. Puttaraju	JD(S)	80,289	43.66	Won	+10,862	+5.91
2018	Melukote	SWR	73,779	42.17	C. S. Puttaraju	JD(S)	96,003	54.87	Lost	-22,224	-12.70
