= Basavaraju V. Shivaganga =

Indian politician (born 1981)

Basavaraju V. Shivaganga (born 1981) is an Indian politician from Karnataka. He is an MLA from Channagiri Assembly constituency in Davangere district. He won the 2023 Karnataka Legislative Assembly election representing Indian National Congress.

== Early life and education ==
Shivaganga is from Channagiri, Davangere district. His father Veerappa D is a farmer. He completed his B.A. in 2001 at A.R.M. Pre University College, Davanagere.

== Career ==
Shivaganga won from Channagiri Assembly constituency representing Indian National Congress in the 2023 Karnataka Legislative Assembly election. He polled 78,263 votes and defeated his nearest rival, Madal Mallikarjuna, an independent candidate, by a margin of 16,435 votes.
