= G. D. Harish Gowda =

Indian politician

Gungralchatra Devegowda Harish Gowda (born 1987) is an Indian politician from Karnataka. He is an MLA from Hunsur Assembly constituency in Mysore district. He represents Janata Dal (Secular) Party and won the 2023 Karnataka Legislative Assembly election from Hunsur.

== Early life and education ==
Harish is from Hunsur, Mysore district. He completed his graduation in engineering in 2009 from National Institute of Engineering, Mysore. His father G. T. Devegowda was a four time MLA.

== Career ==
Harish won the 2023 Karnataka Legislative Assembly election representing JD(S) from Hunsur Assembly constituency. He polled 94,666 votes and defeated his nearest rival, H. P. Manjunath of Indian National Congress, by a narrow margin of 2,412 votes.
