= Sarvodaya Karnataka Paksha =

- Abbreviation: SKP
- Leader: Darshan Puttannaiah
- President: Darshan Puttannaiah (National); Chamarasa Mali Patil (State)
- Chairman: Amzad Pasha
- General Secretary: Prasanna. N. Gowda
- Parliamentary Chairperson: none
- Treasurer: Shivaraj Haralikatte
- Founder: Devanur Mahadeva
- Founded: 2005
- Merged into: Swaraj Abhiyan
- Headquarters: No. 151, 59th feet road, 1st block, 3rd phase, Banashankari 3rd Stage, Bangalore, Karnataka – 560085
- Peasant's wing: Karnataka Rajya Raitha Sangha
- Colours: Yellow
- ECI status: Registered unrecognised
- Alliance: INDIA (2023–present)
- Seats in Rajya Sabha: 0 / 245
- Seats in Lok Sabha: 0 / 543
- Seats in Karnataka Legislative Assembly: 1 / 224

Sarvodaya Karnataka Paksha is an Indian political party mainly based in Karnataka state of India. It was relaunched in 2016 by its lone Member of the Karnataka Legislative Assembly K. S. Puttannaiah and Devanooru Mahadeva. It was formed in 2005 by Devanur Mahadeva and later merged in Swaraj India of Yogendra Yadav in 2017.

== History ==
Sarvodaya Karnataka Paksha won one seat in 2013 Karnataka Legislative Assembly election on which K. S. Puttanniah.

In January 2023, with Swaraj India deciding not to contest the elections, SKP relaunched itself and announced five candidates. SKP fought the 2023 Karnataka Legislative Assembly elections in five seats, namely Melukote, Belthangady, Virajpet, Bilgi and Mandya constituencies. SKP won the Melukote seat. Darshan Puttannaiah, son of late Puttannaiah, won the 2023 Assembly election from Melukote with support from Congress. He defeated C. S. Puttaraju of JD(S) by a margin of 10,862. In 2018, Darshan, contesting on Swaraj India ticket, lost to the same candidate, despite the support of Congress.

Congress took a strategic decision to support SKP as it enjoys the support of a huge section of the farmers and is backed by Karnataka Rajya Raitha Sangha and its youth wing, Hasiru Sena.

== Leadership ==
- Devanur Mahadeva - Founder
- K. S. Puttannaiah - Former President
- Darshan Puttannaiah - President and Leader
- Chamarasamali Patil - Karnataka State President

== List of National Presidents ==
No.	Portrait	Name (Birth–Death)	Term in office		
No.	Portrait	Name (Birth–Death)	Assumed office	Left office	Time in office
1		Darshan Puttannaiah (1977/78–)	15 January 2019	Incumbent	7 years, 270 days
