= Karnataka Rajya Raitha Sangha =

Indian farmers' movement

Karnataka Rajya Raitha Sangha, also known as KRRS, is a farmer's movement. M. D. Nanjundaswamy was the president of the organisation.

Karnataka Rajya Raitha Sangha's state president is Chamarasa Mali Patil. He is based in Raichur District, present Karnataka Rajya Raitha Sangha State President Mallappanahalli Girish Gowda M T. He is based in Ramanagar district.
