= 2024 Indian general election in Karnataka =

Indian political election in Karnataka

- 26 April and 7 May 2024

All 28 Karnataka seats in the Lok Sabha
- Opinion polls
- Turnout: 70.90%(▲2.09%)
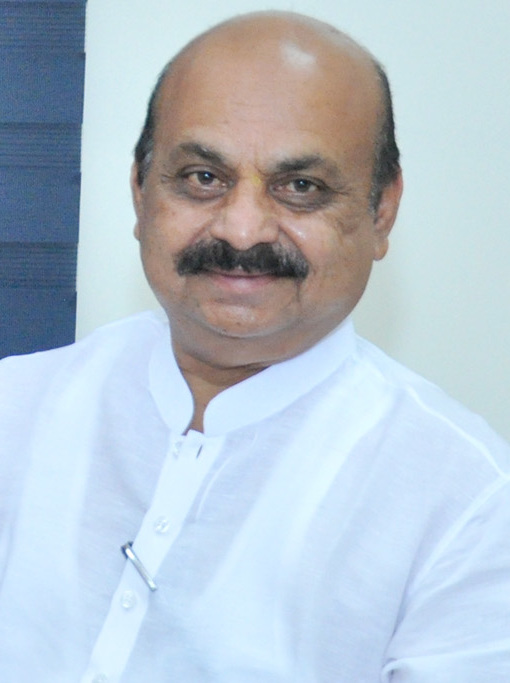

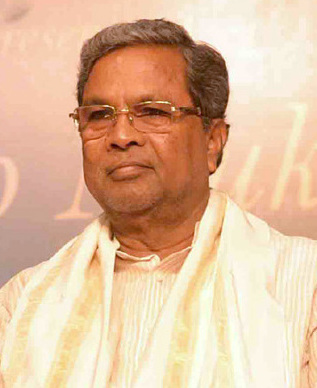

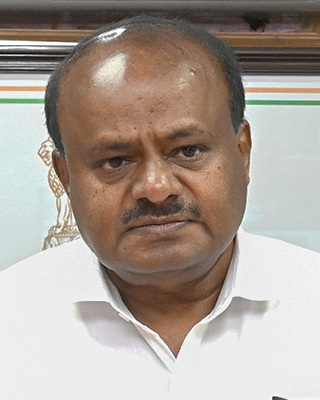
	First party	Second party	Third party
Leader	Basavaraj Bommai	Siddaramaiah	H. D. Kumaraswamy
Party	BJP	INC	JD(S)
Alliance	NDA	INDIA	NDA
Leader since	2023	2020	1999
Leader's seat	Haveri	Not contested	Mandya
Last election	51.38%, 25 seats	31.88%, 1 seat	9.67%, 1 seat
Seats won	17	9	2
Seat change	▼8	▲8	▲1
Popular vote	1,77,97,699	1,75,54,381	21,63,203
Percentage	46.06%	45.43%	5.60%
Swing	▼5.32 pp	▲13.55 pp	▼4.07 pp
Prime Minister before election
Narendra Modi
BJP
Prime Minister after election
Narendra Modi
BJP

The 2024 Indian general election was held in Karnataka on 26 April 2024 and 7 May 2024, during the second and third phases respectively, to elect members of the 18th Lok Sabha.

== Background ==
The last date for filing nominations for candidates contesting in constituencies falling in the phase two of the polls was 4 April, and that for phase three was 19 April.

A total of 247 candidates, which included 226 men and 21 women, contested from the 14 constituencies that went for polls in phase two on 26 April. The constituency with most contestants was Chikballapur (29) and the least was Dakshina Kannada (9). More than 28.8 million voters were eligible to vote in 30,602 polling stations. Of these, 19,701 polling stations were announced to be webcast, and 1,370 would be covered via CCTVs. It also included 1,832 special booths with 1,120 of them dedicated to women voters. It was reported that those booths would only have women personnel, including the police and group-D workers. 224 booths were set up for disabled persons, with disabled persons serving as the personnel there. Another 224 booths were set up dedicated for youth with young officials as personnel, intended to encourage youth to take part in polling. In addition to this, one theme-based polling booth in every Assembly constituency was set up that intending to focus on the cultural heritage of the region. Ahead of the phase two, the Chief Electoral Officer of Karnataka stated that 140,000 personnel would be on duty and that 5,000 micro-observers, 50,000 civil police personnel, 65 companies of Central Parliamentary Force and State Armed Police force of other States would also be deployed for security.

The remaining 14 constituencies that went for polls on 7 May as part of phase three saw a total of 227 candidates contesting, which included 206 men and 21 women. Among these, the Davanagere constituency had the most candidates (30), and Raichur, the least (8). More than 25.9 million voters were eligible in 28,269 polling stations. Of these, 17,000 polling stations were covered by webcasting. Around 1.45 lakh officials were deployed, and additionally, 35,000 civil police personnel, 65 companies of the Paramilitary forces and armed police of other states were deployed. It was reported that 4,000 micro-observers would be on duty.

== Election schedule ==
Phase wise schedule of 2024 Indian general election in Karnataka

Poll event	Phase	
Poll event	II	III
Notification date	28 March	12 April
Last date for filing nomination	4 April	19 April
Scrutiny of nomination	5 April	20 April
Last Date for withdrawal of nomination	8 April	22 April
Date of poll	26 April	7 May
Date of counting of votes/Result	4 June 2024	
No. of constituencies	14	14

== Parties and alliances ==
=== National Democratic Alliance ===
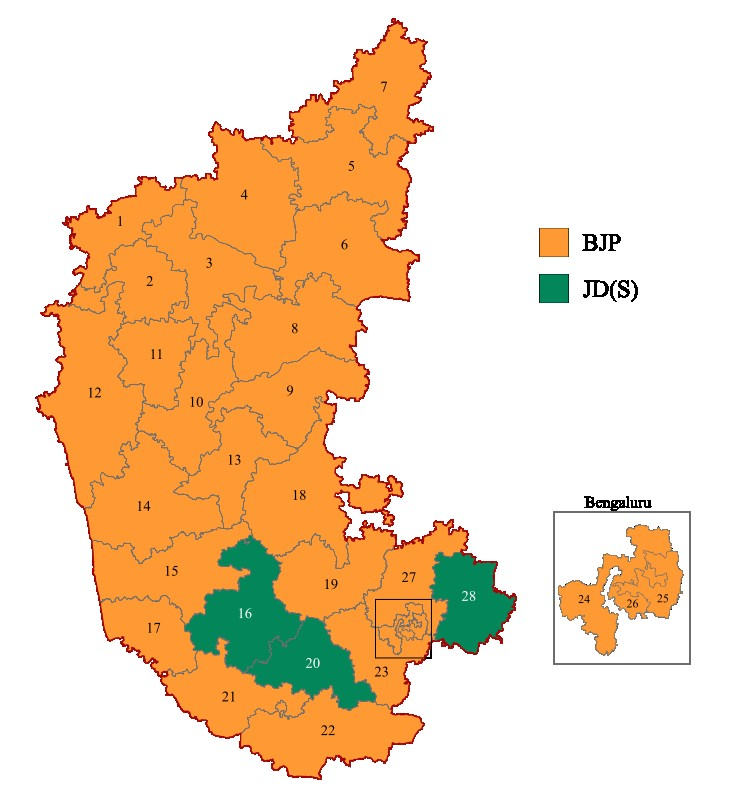
National Democratic Alliance

Party	Flag	Symbol	Leader	Seats contested
Bharatiya Janata Party			B. Y. Vijayendra	25
Janata Dal (Secular)			H. D. Kumaraswamy	3
Total				28

=== Indian National Developmental Inclusive Alliance ===
Indian National Developmental Inclusive Alliance

Party	Flag	Symbol	Leader	Seats contested
Indian National Congress			Siddaramaiah	28

=== Others ===
Recognised parties
Party	Flag	Symbol	Leader	Seats contested
Bahujan Samaj Party			TBD	21
Communist Party of India (Marxist)			TBD	1
Total				22

Unrecognised parties
Party	Symbol	Seats contested
Karnataka Rashtra Samithi		28
Uttama Prajaakeeya Party		20
Socialist Unity Centre of India (Communist)		19
Bahujan Bharat Party		4
Bharatiya Prajagala Kalyana Paksha		4
Prahar Janshakti Party		4
Republican Party of India (Athawale)		4
Samajwadi Janata Party (Karnataka)		4
Young Star Empowerment Party		4
Country Citizen Party		3
Indian Labour Party (Ambedkar Phule)		3
Kannada Paksha		3
Karunada Sevakara Party		3
Navabharath Sena		3
Rashtriya Samaj Dal (R)		3
Republican Party of India (Karnataka)		3
Socialist Party (India)		3
All India Ulama Congress		2
Indian Movement Party		2
Janahitha Paksha		2
Karnataka Janata Paksha		2
Naki Bharatiya Ekta Party		2
Proutist Bloc, India		2
Purvanchal Mahapanchayat		2
Rani Chennamma Party		2
Sarva Janata Party		2
Tipu Sultan Party		2
Viduthalai Chiruthaigal Katchi		2
Voters Independent Party		2
Bharatheeya Jawan Kisan Party		1
Bhartiya Bahujan Kranti Dal		1
Bhartiya Jan Samrat Party		1
Challengers Party		1
Delhi Janta Party		1
Desh Prem Party		1
Digvijaya Bharatha Party		1
Dr. Ambedkar People's Party		1
Ekam Sanatan Bharat Dal		1
Gareeb Aadmi Party		1
Karnataka Karmikara Paksha		1
Karnataka Praja Party (RaithaParva)		1
Karunaadu Party		1
Kranti Kari Jai Hind Sena		1
National Maha Sabha Party		1
Proutist Sarva Samaj		1
Pyramid Party of India		1
Raita Bharat Party		1
Rashtriya Samaj Paksha		1
Republican Party of India Bharatha		1
Samaj Vikas Kranti Party		1
Secular Democratic Congress		1
Total		161

== Candidates ==
Constituency					
Constituency		NDA		INDIA	
1	Chikkodi	BJP	Annasaheb Jolle	INC	Priyanka Jarkiholi
2	Belgaum	BJP	Jagadish Shettar	INC	Mrinal Ravindra Hebbalkar
3	Bagalkot	BJP	P. C. Gaddigoudar	INC	Samyukta S Patil
4	Bijapur (SC)	BJP	Ramesh Jigajinagi	INC	H.R. Algur
5	Gulbarga (SC)	BJP	Umesh. G. Jadhav	INC	Radhakrishna Doddamani
6	Raichur (ST)	BJP	Raja Amareshwara Naik	INC	G Kumar Naik
7	Bidar	BJP	Bhagwanth Khuba	INC	Sagar Khandre
8	Koppal	BJP	Basavaraj Kyavator	INC	K. Rajashekar Basavaraj Hitnal
9	Bellary (ST)	BJP	B. Sriramulu	INC	E. Tukaram
10	Haveri	BJP	Basavaraj Bommai	INC	Anandswamy Gaddadevara Math
11	Dharwad	BJP	Pralhad Joshi	INC	Vinod Asooti
12	Uttara Kannada	BJP	Vishweshwar Hegde Kageri	INC	Anjali Nimbalkar
13	Davanagere	BJP	Gayathri Siddheshwara	INC	Prabha Mallikarjun
14	Shimoga	BJP	B. Y. Raghavendra	INC	Geeta Shivarajkumar
15	Udupi Chikmagalur	BJP	Kota Srinivas Poojary	INC	K. Jayaprakash Hegde
16	Hassan	JD(S)	Prajwal Revanna	INC	Shreyas Patel Gowda
17	Dakshina Kannada	BJP	Brijesh Chowta	INC	Padmaraj
18	Chitradurga (SC)	BJP	Govind Karjol	INC	B. N. Chandrappa
19	Tumkur	BJP	V. Somanna	INC	S. P. Muddahanumegowda
20	Mandya	JD(S)	H.D. Kumaraswamy	INC	Venkataramane Gowda
21	Mysore	BJP	Yaduveer Wadiyar	INC	M Lakshman
22	Chamarajanagar (SC)	BJP	S. Balaraj	INC	Sunil Bose
23	Bangalore Rural	BJP	C. N. Manjunath	INC	D. K. Suresh
24	Bangalore North	BJP	Shobha Karandlaje	INC	Rajeev Gowda
25	Bangalore Central	BJP	P. C. Mohan	INC	Mansoor Ali Khan
26	Bangalore South	BJP	Tejasvi Surya	INC	Soumya Reddy
27	Chikballapur	BJP	K. Sudhakar	INC	Raksha Ramaiah
28	Kolar (SC)	JD(S)	M Mallesh Babu	INC	K V Gowtham

== Campaign ==
The Bharatiya Janata Party's (BJP) Karnataka campaign kicked off in March 2024, a month before going to polls. It was announced that Prime Minister Narendra Modi would visit Gulbarga, the constituency represented by Indian National Congress (INC) President Mallikarjun Kharge twice in the past. It was earlier reported that he would participate in four rallies between 15 and 19 March, starting in Kolar. He addressed a gathering in Kalaburagi (formerly Gulbarga) on 16 March to kick off the campaign. Modi alleged widespread corruption in Karnataka and stated: "Bad governance, disorder and anarchy start spreading in all directions when the entire capital of the entire State is being used for filling the belly, pockets and treasury of a few people. Congress had promised free electricity, but people got power cut and darkness. Farmers are asking how their pump sets in the field would operate when there is no power supply." Former Chief Minister of Karnataka and BJP leader B. S. Yediyurappa predicted that the National Democratic Alliance (NDA) would win all 28 seats from the State. Former Prime Minister and leader of the Janata Dal (Secular), which is a part of the NDA, H. D. Deve Gowda, also participated in the campaigns.

The INC, in March 2024, constituted a three-member campaign committee for Karnataka, which included Vinay Kumar Sorake, L. Hanumanthaiah and Rizwan Arshad. The incumbent Chief Minister of Karnataka, Siddaramaiah, of the INC, campaigned focusing on the constituencies of Mysore–Kodagu and Chamarajanagar for his party. He predicted that his party would win up to 20 seats and directed criticism at the BJP over "hike in price of petrol, diesel and domestic gas." Former INC President Rahul Gandhi addressed a gathering in Mandya and stated that the elections was a "a fight between two ideologies." He criticized the BJP over the Electoral Bond issue, terming it a form of "extortion". On the day of phase two polls, he addressed two public meetings in the northern Karnataka that was to go for polls on 7 May, and termed the BJP as "Bharatiya Chombu Party"; Chombu in Kannada meant a round water pot, to convey emptiness and deception. He accused the party of not giving Karnataka its drought relief amounting to ₹18,000 crore, and the ₹60,000 crore mandated by the Finance Commission, and gave "chombu" instead.

== Surveys and polls ==
Polling agency	Date published	Margin of error				Lead
Polling agency	Date published	Margin of error	NDA	INDIA	Others	Lead
ABP News-CVoter	April 2024	±3-5%	23	5	0	NDA
ABP News-CVoter	March 2024	±5%	23	5	0	NDA
India Today-CVoter	February 2024	±3-5%	24	4	0	NDA
ABP News-CVoter	December 2023	±3-5%	22-24	4-6	0	NDA
Times Now-ETG	December 2023	±3%	20-22	6-8	0-1	NDA
India TV-CNX	October 2023	±3%	18	10	0	NDA
Times Now-ETG	September 2023	±3%	18-21	7-9	0	NDA
Times Now-ETG	August 2023	±3%	18-20	8-10	0-1	NDA
India Today-CVoter	August 2023	±3-5%	23	5	0	NDA

Polling agency	Date published	Margin of error				Lead
Polling agency	Date published	Margin of error	NDA	INDIA	Others	Lead
ABP News-CVoter	April 2024	±3-5%	52%	42%	6%	10
Eedina	March 2024	±2%	42.4%	43.8%	13.8%	1.4
ABP News-CVoter	March 2024	±5%	53%	42%	5%	11
India Today-CVoter	February 2024	±3-5%	53%	42%	5%	11
India Today-CVoter	August 2023	±3-5%	44%	34%	22%	10

== Voter turnout ==
=== Phase wise ===
Phase	Poll date	Constituencies	Voter turnout (%)
II	26 April 2024	Udupi Chikmagalur, Hassan, Dakshina Kannada, Chitradurga, Tumkur, Mandya, Mysore, Chamarajanagar, Bangalore Rural, Bangalore North, Bangalore Central, Bangalore South, Chikkballapur, Kolar	69.56%
III	7 May 2024	Chikkodi, Belgaum, Bagalkot, Bijapur, Gulbarga, Raichur, Bidar, Koppal, Bellary, Haveri, Dharwad, Uttara Kannada, Davanagere, Shimoga	71.84%
Total			70.64%

=== Constituency wise ===
Constituency		Poll date	Turnout	Swing
1	Chikkodi	7 May 2024	78.66%	3.04%▲
2	Belgaum	7 May 2024	71.49%	3.65%▲
3	Bagalkot	7 May 2024	72.66%	1.96%▲
4	Bijapur (SC)	7 May 2024	66.32%	4.43%▲
5	Gulbarga (SC)	7 May 2024	62.25%	1.07%▲
6	Raichur (ST)	7 May 2024	64.66%	6.32%▲
7	Bidar	7 May 2024	65.47%	2.47%▲
8	Koppal	7 May 2024	70.99%	2.43%▲
9	Bellary (ST)	7 May 2024	73.59%	3.83%▲
10	Haveri	7 May 2024	77.60%	3.39%▲
11	Dharwad	7 May 2024	74.37%	4.08%▲
12	Uttara Kannada	7 May 2024	76.53%	2.37%▲
13	Davanagere	7 May 2024	76.99%	3.80%▲
14	Shimoga	7 May 2024	78.33%	1.75%▲
15	Udupi Chikmagalur	26 April 2024	77.15%	1.08%▲
16	Hassan	26 April 2024	77.68%	0.33%▲
17	Dakshina Kannada	26 April 2024	77.56%	0.43%▼
18	Chitradurga (SC)	26 April 2024	73.30%	2.50%▲
19	Tumkur	26 April 2024	78.05%	0.62%▲
20	Mandya	26 April 2024	81.67%	1.08%▲
21	Mysore	26 April 2024	70.62%	1.11%▲
22	Chamarajanagar (SC)	26 April 2024	76.82%	1.47%▲
23	Bangalore Rural	26 April 2024	68.30%	3.32%▲
24	Bangalore North	26 April 2024	54.45%	0.31%▼
25	Bangalore Central	26 April 2024	54.06%	0.26%▼
26	Bangalore South	26 April 2024	53.17%	0.53%▼
27	Chikballapur	26 April 2024	76.98%	0.26%▲
28	Kolar (SC)	26 April 2024	78.27%	1.02%▲
			70.64%	1.83%▲

== Results ==
=== Results by alliance or party ===
Alliance/ Party		Popular vote			Seats		
Alliance/ Party		Votes	%	±pp	Contested	Won	+/−
NDA	BJP	17,797,699	46.06	▼5.69	25	17	▼8
NDA	JD(S)	2,163,203	5.60	▼4.14	3	2	▲1
NDA	Total	19,960,902	51.66	▼1.55	28	19	▼7
INDIA	INC	17,554,381	45.43	▲13.32	28	9	▲8
Others		906,384	2.35	▼2.75	28	0	▼1
NOTA		217,456	0.56	▼0.16			
Total		38,639,123	100%	Steady	28	28	Steady

=== Results by constituency ===
Constituency			Winner				Runner Up				Margin	%
#	Name	Poll %	Candidate	Party	Votes	%	Candidate	Party	Votes	%	Margin	%
1	Chikkodi	78.81 ▲	Priyanka Jarkiholi	INC	713,461	51.21	Annasaheb Jolle	BJP	622,627	44.69	90,834	6.52
2	Belgaum	71.79 ▲	Jagadish Shettar	BJP	762,029	55.06	Mrinal Ravindra Hebbalkar	INC	583,592	42.17	178,437	12.89
3	Bagalkot	72.91 ▲	P. C. Gaddigoudar	BJP	671,039	50.93	Samyukta S Patil	INC	602,640	45.74	68,399	5.19
4	Bijapur (SC)	66.59 ▲	Ramesh Jigajinagi	BJP	672,781	51.91	Raju Alagur	INC	595,552	45.95	77,229	5.96
5	Gulbarga (SC)	62.48 ▲	Radhakrishna Doddamani	INC	652,321	49.78	Umesh. G. Jadhav	BJP	625,116	47.70	27,205	2.08
6	Raichur (ST)	64.90 ▲	G Kumar Naik	INC	670,966	51.63	Raja Amareshwara Naik	BJP	591,185	45.49	79,781	6.14
7	Bidar	65.62 ▲	Sagar Eshwar Khandre	INC	666,317	53.63	Bhagwanth Khuba	BJP	537,442	43.26	128,875	10.37
8	Koppal	71.23 ▲	K. Rajashekar Hitnal	INC	663,511	49.93	Basavaraj Kyavator	BJP	617,154	46.44	46,357	3.49
9	Bellary (ST)	73.76 ▲	E. Tukaram	INC	730,845	52.58	B. Sriramulu	BJP	631,853	45.46	98,992	7.12
10	Haveri	77.86 ▲	Basavaraj Bommai	BJP	705,538	50.55	Anandswamy G. Math	INC	662,025	47.43	43,513	3.12
11	Dharwad	74.51 ▲	Pralhad Joshi	BJP	716,231	52.41	Vinod Asooti	INC	618,907	45.29	97,324	7.12
12	Uttara Kannada	76.80 ▲	Vishweshwar Kageri	BJP	782,495	61.97	Anjali Nimbalkar	INC	445,067	35.25	337,428	26.72
13	Davanagere	77.27 ▲	Prabha Mallikarjun	INC	633,059	47.95	Gayithri Siddeshwara	BJP	606,965	45.97	26,094	1.98
14	Shimoga	78.61 ▲	B. Y. Raghavendra	BJP	778,721	56.54	Geeta Shivarajkumar	INC	535,006	38.85	243,715	17.69
15	Udupi Chikmagalur	77.63 ▲	Kota Srinivas Poojary	BJP	732,234	59.56	K. Jayaprakash Hegde	INC	473,059	38.48	259,175	21.08
16	Hassan	78.06 ▲	Shreyas. M. Patel	INC	672,988	49.67	Prajwal Revanna	JD(S)	630,339	46.52	42,649	3.15
17	Dakshina Kannada	78.02 ▲	Brijesh Chowta	BJP	764,132	53.97	Padmaraj	INC	614,924	43.43	149,208	10.54
18	Chitradurga (SC)	73.65 ▲	Govind Karjol	BJP	684,890	50.11	B. N. Chandrappa	INC	636,769	46.58	48,121	3.53
19	Tumkur	78.49 ▲	V. Somanna	BJP	720,946	55.31	S. P. Muddahanumegowda	INC	545,352	41.84	175,594	13.47
20	Mandya	82.05 ▲	H. D. Kumaraswamy	JD(S)	851,881	58.34	Venkataramane Gowda	INC	567,261	38.85	284,620	19.49
21	Mysore	70.96 ▲	Yaduveer Wadiyar	BJP	795,503	53.59	M Lakshman	INC	656,241	44.21	139,262	9.38
22	Chamarajanagar (SC)	77.04 ▲	Sunil Bose	INC	751,671	54.87	S. Balaraj	BJP	562,965	41.10	188,706	13.77
23	Bangalore Rural	68.52 ▲	C. N. Manjunath	BJP	1,079,002	56.21	D. K. Suresh	INC	809,355	42.16	269,647	14.05
24	Bangalore North	54.64 ▼	Shobha Karandlaje	BJP	986,049	56.27	Rajeev Gowda	INC	726,573	41.46	259,476	14.81
25	Bangalore Central	54.16 ▼	P. C. Mohan	BJP	658,915	50.05	Mansoor Ali Khan	INC	626,208	47.57	32,707	2.48
26	Bangalore South	53.38 ▼	Tejasvi Surya	BJP	750,830	60.10	Soumya Reddy	INC	473,747	37.92	277,083	22.18
27	Chikkballapur	77.26 ▲	K. Sudhakar	BJP	822,619	53.74	Raksha Ramaiah	INC	659,159	43.06	163,460	10.68
28	Kolar (SC)	78.51 ▲	M. Mallesh Babu	JD(S)	691,481	51.02	K. V. Gowtham	INC	620,093	45.76	71,388	5.26

=== Assembly Segment wise leads ===
Constituency		Winner			Runner-up			Margin
#	Name	Party	Votes	%	Party	Votes	%	Margin
Chikkodi Lok Sabha constituency
1	Nippani	INC	1,06,050	56.35	BJP	76,928	41.01	29,122
2	Chikkodi-Sadalga	INC	97,159	50.39	BJP	80,569	43.44	16,500
3	Athani	BJP	96,041	50.79	INC	87,376	46.21	8,665
4	Kagwad	INC	84,075	51.93	BJP	72,877	45.01	11,198
5	Kudachi (SC)	INC	84,158	54.94	BJP	61,570	40.20	22,588
6	Raybag (SC)	INC	79,821	47.43	BJP	73,002	43.37	6,819
7	Hukkeri	BJP	85,226	50.50	INC	77,642	46.01	7,584
10	Yemkanmardi (ST)	INC	94,542	55.14	BJP	71,955	41.96	22,587
Belgaum Lok Sabha constituency
8	Arabhavi	BJP	1,01,114	54.44	INC	79,639	42.88	21,475
9	Gokak	BJP	1,02,519	55.20	INC	78,622	42.34	23,897
11	Belgaum Uttar	BJP	83,938	49.73	INC	81,537	48.30	2,401
12	Belgaum Dakshin	BJP	1,19,249	69.39	INC	46,029	26.78	73,220
13	Belgaum Rural	BJP	1,24,790	60.74	INC	74,441	36.18	50,529
16	Bailhongal	BJP	82,015	56.10	INC	60,618	41.46	21,396
17	Saundatti Yellamma	INC	84,888	54.07	BJP	67,937	43.27	16,951
18	Ramdurg	INC	75,123	48.65	BJP	74,729	48.40	394
Bagalkot Lok Sabha constituency
19	Mudhol (SC)	BJP	84,357	52.84	INC	70,199	43.97	14,158
20	Terdal	BJP	93,604	50.91	INC	84,467	45.99	9,137
21	Mudhol	BJP	81,660	49.98	INC	77,889	47.61	3,871
22	Bilgi	BJP	88,063	50.21	INC	81,162	46.28	6,901
23	Badami	BJP	83,075	51.11	INC	72,893	44.84	10,182
24	Bagalkot	BJP	88,115	52.58	INC	74,093	44.21	14,022
25	Hungund	BJP	79,323	51.48	INC	69,969	45.07	9,354
68	Nargund	INC	70,169	48.53	BJP	69,244	47.89	925
Bijapur Lok Sabha constituency
26	Muddebihal	BJP	72,650	50.15	INC	68,688	47.42	3,962
27	Devar Hippargi	BJP	72,549	51.92	INC	63,543	45.46	9,026
28	Basavana Bagewadi	BJP	83,916	54.28	INC	66,363	43.01	17,553
29	Babaleshwar	BJP	79,002	49.81	INC	75,651	47.70	3,351
30	Bijapur City	INC	92,984	52.14	BJP	83,714	46.87	9,270
31	Nagthan (SC)	BJP	96,158	49.81	INC	84,373	45.72	11,785
32	Indi	BJP	95,064	56.61	INC	69,340	41.29	25,724
33	Sindagi	BJP	96,158	53.24	INC	84,373	44.79	13,647
Gulbarga Lok Sabha constituency
34	Afzalpur	BJP	85,929	55.42	INC	65,300	42.11	20,629
35	Jevargi	BJP	79,703	50.23	INC	74,677	47.06	5,026
39	Gurmitkal	BJP	82,642	52.92	INC	66,240	42.42	16,222
40	Chittapur (SC)	INC	80,756	53.97	BJP	64,416	43.05	16,340
41	Sedam	INC	81,992	51.46	BJP	72,785	45.68	9,207
43	Gulbarga Rural (SC)	INC	81,826	49.38	BJP	79,749	48.12	2,077
44	Gulbarga Dakshin	BJP	87,078	52.00	INC	77,790	46.45	9,288
45	Gulbarga	INC	1,22,042	62.82	BJP	70,713	36.19	51,729
Raichur Lok Sabha constituency
36	Shorapur (ST)	INC	1,12,463	52.67	BJP	95,903	45.91	16,560
37	Shahapur	INC	78,050	51.70	BJP	68,465	45.35	9,585
38	Yadgir	INC	75,705	50.26	BJP	69,883	46.46	5,922
52	Raichur Rural (ST)	BJP	83,233	49.97	INC	78,272	46.99	4,961
54	Raichur	INC	78,844	52.28	BJP	69,595	46.14	9,249
55	Manvi (ST)	INC	76,641	49.95	BJP	72,979	47.56	3,662
48	Devadurga (ST)	INC	80,923	55.55	BJP	58,584	40.24	22,339
63	Lingsugur	INC	88,515	53.91	BJP	70,091	42.68	18,424
Bidar Lok Sabha constituency
42	Chincholi (SC)	INC	67,360	50.30	BJP	61,445	45.88	5,905
46	Aland	BJP	78,209	52.62	INC	65,273	43.92	12,936
47	Basavakalyan	INC	82,618	51.34	BJP	73,161	45.47	9,457
48	Humnabad	INC	96,009	56.46	BJP	69,087	40.63	26,522
49	Bidar South	INC	90,776	61.05	BJP	53,956	36.29	36,820
50	Bidar	INC	94,247	59.32	BJP	61,770	38.88	32,477
51	Bhalki	INC	89,180	53.44	BJP	72,437	43.40	16,743
52	Aurad	INC	79,699	52.58	BJP	65,701	43.34	13,998
Koppal Lok Sabha constituency
58	Sindhanur	BJP	81,785	50.02	INC	76,194	46.60	5,591
59	Maski (ST)	INC	69,028	49.46	BJP	64,420	46.16	4,548
61	Kushtagi	BJP	81,331	48.44	INC	79,496	47.35	1,835
61	Kanakagiri (SC)	INC	83,944	49.46	BJP	79,506	46.16	7,348
62	Gangavati	INC	84,199	53.26	BJP	69,045	43.67	15,154
63	Yelburga	BJP	82,491	45.27	INC	80,414	42.10	2,077
64	Koppal	INC	99,043	50.43	BJP	91,695	46.69	7,348
92	Siruguppa (ST)	INC	87,526	54.56	BJP	66,610	41.52	20,916
Bellary Lok Sabha constituency
88	Hadagalli (SC)	INC	76,486	51.87	BJP	68,229	46.19	8,257
89	Hagaribommanahalli (SC)	INC	97,103	52.37	BJP	84,903	45.79	12,200
90	Vijayanagara	BJP	90,120	49.21	INC	89,955	49.12	165
91	Kampli (ST)	INC	91,047	51.48	BJP	81,468	46.07	9,579
93	Bellary (ST)	INC	1,01,434	56.25	BJP	75,556	41.90	25,878
94	Bellary City	INC	94,628	53.27	BJP	80,247	45.17	14,381
95	Sandur (ST)	INC	95,936	54.91	BJP	74,783	42.84	21,153
96	Kudligi (ST)	INC	82,992	51.57	BJP	74,447	46.26	8,545
Haveri Lok Sabha constituency
65	Shirahatti	INC	84,174	50.89	BJP	77,238	46.69	6,936
66	Gadag	BJP	88,717	52.00	INC	78,208	45.84	10,509
67	Ron	INC	86,576	49.48	BJP	83,267	47.59	3,309
82	Hangal	BJP	92,124	51.86	INC	83,200	46.79	8,924
84	Haveri	BJP	90,382	49.05	INC	89,993	48.84	389
85	Bydagi	BJP	88,959	51.82	INC	81,767	46.90	7,192
86	Hirekerur	BJP	86,050	55.33	INC	67,330	43.29	18,720
84	Ranebennur	BJP	95,452	50.85	INC	88,943	47.38	6,509
Dharwad Lok Sabha constituency
69	Navalgund	INC	88,202	53.79	BJP	70,990	43.30	17,212
70	Kundgol	BJP	75,544	49.19	INC	73,884	48.11	1,660
71	Dharwad	BJP	93,542	54.91	INC	72,226	42.39	21,316
72	Hubli-Dharwad East (SC)	INC	93,873	57.44	BJP	67,097	41.06	26,776
73	Hubli-Dharwad Central	BJP	1,13,678	63.59	INC	62,360	34.88	51,388
74	Hubli-Dharwad West	BJP	1,13,086	60.18	INC	71,498	38.05	41,588
75	Kalghatgi	BJP	96,402	58.58	INC	63,665	38.69	32,737
83	Shiggaon	INC	91,908	51.04	BJP	83,310	46.26	8,598
Uttara Kannada Lok Sabha constituency
14	Khanapur	BJP	1,07,978	66.63	INC	48,148	29.71	59,830
15	Kittur	BJP	92,445	60.51	INC	56,203	36.78	36,242
76	Haliyal	BJP	83,426	59.18	INC	54,546	38.69	28,880
77	Karwar	BJP	1,13,317	68.42	INC	47,889	28.91	65,489
78	Kumta	BJP	97,928	66.47	INC	44,435	30.16	53,493
79	Bhatkal	BJP	1,00,288	57.94	INC	67,885	39.22	32,403
80	Sirsi	BJP	1,00,252	60.79	INC	60,124	36.45	40,528
97	Yellapur	BJP	82,453	55.41	INC	64,066	42.89	18,387
Davanagere Lok Sabha constituency
103	Jagalur (ST)	INC	76,129	49.46	BJP	67,164	43.63	8,965
104	Harapanahalli	BJP	81,501	47.23	INC	77,406	44.86	4,095
105	Harihar	INC	80,937	47.97	BJP	76,298	45.22	4,639
106	Davangere North	BJP	97,064	54.46	INC	72,076	40.44	24,988
107	Davanagere South	INC	84,621	54.60	BJP	62,777	40.50	21,844
108	Mayakonda (SC)	INC	78,541	48.52	BJP	75,265	46.49	2,976
109	Channagiri	INC	82,266	51.04	BJP	72,169	44.77	10,097
110	Honnali	INC	79,477	49.46	BJP	72,293	43.63	7,184
Shimoga Lok Sabha constituency
111	Shimoga Rural	BJP	1,06,243	58.10	INC	66,575	36.40	39,688
112	Bhadravati	BJP	84,208	54.03	INC	65,105	41.77	19,043
113	Shimoga	BJP	1,06,243	55.26	INC	71,179	37.01	35,090
114	Tirthahalli	BJP	92,993	58.10	INC	57,444	36.48	35,549
115	Shikaripura	BJP	87,143	51.68	INC	75,672	44.88	11,481
116	Sorab	BJP	88,170	54.02	INC	70,233	43.03	17,937
117	Sagar	BJP	95,209	56.44	INC	68,690	40.72	26,519
118	Byndoor	BJP	1,15,486	62.85	INC	58,724	31.95	56,762
Udupi Chikmagalur Lok Sabha constituency
119	Kundapura	BJP	1,07,173	64.11	INC	57,078	34.05	50,095
120	Udupi	BJP	1,06,489	61.81	INC	62,748	36.42	43,741
121	Kapu	BJP	91,077	59.72	INC	58,947	38.65	32,130
122	Karkala	BJP	95,295	61.81	INC	54,178	35.14	41,747
123	Sringeri	BJP	79,175	58.35	INC	53,937	39.75	25,238
124	Mudigere (SC)	BJP	74,597	56.09	INC	54,572	41.03	20,025
125	Chikmagalur	BJP	92,788	56.49	INC	68,995	42.00	23,793
126	Tarikere	BJP	80,995	56.43	INC	60,314	42.02	20,681
Hassan Lok Sabha constituency
127	Kadur	JD(S)	76,369	49.07	INC	74,126	47.63	2,243
193	Shravanabelagola	INC	81,800	48.53	JD(S)	81,729	48.53	71
194	Arsikere	INC	87,126	49.43	JD(S)	84,033	47.67	3,093
195	Belur	JD(S)	74,240	48.36	INC	72,608	47.30	1,632
196	Hassan	INC	88,347	53.88	JD(S)	68,587	41.83	19,760
197	Holenarasipur	INC	97,800	53.39	JD(S)	80,193	43.78	17,607
198	Arkalgud	INC	95,065	51.56	JD(S)	80,637	43.74	14,428
199	Sakleshpur	JD(S)	80,748	49.61	INC	73,402	45.10	7,346
Dakshina Kannada Lok Sabha constituency
200	Belthangady	BJP	1,01,408	53.57	INC	78,101	41.26	23,307
201	Moodabidri	BJP	92,496	57.53	INC	64,308	40.00	28,188
202	Mangalore City North	BJP	1,08,137	57.41	INC	76,716	40.71	31,421
203	Mangalore City South	BJP	95,537	56.46	INC	71,187	41.26	24,144
204	Mangalore	INC	97,933	59.39	BJP	64,870	41.57	33,063
205	Bantwal	BJP	94,679	50.53	INC	88,686	47.33	5,993
206	Puttur	BJP	1,00,247	57.04	INC	71,557	40.71	28,690
207	Sullia (SC)	BJP	1,02,762	59.29	INC	63,615	36.69	39,147
Chitradurga Lok Sabha constituency
97	Molakalmuru (ST)	INC	1,04,262	54.89	BJP	78,137	41.14	26,125
98	Challakere (ST)	INC	80,499	49.31	BJP	76,974	47.15	3,825
99	Chitradurga	BJP	1,01,430	53.57	INC	83,547	44.12	17,883
100	Hiriyur	BJP	88,794	50.07	INC	82,597	46.58	6,197
101	Hosadurga (SC)	BJP	76,252	51.55	INC	66,565	45.00	9,687
102	Holalkere	BJP	95,991	53.37	INC	78,210	43.84	17,781
136	Sira	BJP	89,847	51.94	INC	77,353	44.72	12,494
137	Pavagada (SC)	BJP	73,792	52.78	INC	61,119	43.71	12,673
Tumkur Lok Sabha constituency
128	Chikkanayakanahalli	BJP	86,028	50.09	INC	79,619	46.36	6,409
129	Tiptur	BJP	84,950	56.33	INC	62,250	41.28	22,700
130	Turuvekere	BJP	93,630	63.55	INC	49,666	33.60	43,964
132	Tumkur City	BJP	92,336	51.13	INC	85,417	47.29	6,919
133	Tumkur Rural	BJP	99,679	56.85	INC	70,859	40.41	28,820
134	Koratagere (SC)	BJP	93,446	55.96	INC	67,905	40.66	25,541
135	Gubbi	BJP	87,146	57.23	INC	60,656	39.89	26,520
138	Madhugiri	BJP	79,494	52.47	INC	66,692	44.02	12,802
Mandya Lok Sabha constituency
186	Malavalli (SC)	JD(S)	99,567	50.82	INC	90,212	46.05	9,355
187	Maddur	JD(S)	1,15,671	64.60	INC	58,993	32.89	56,678
188	Melukote	JD(S)	1,10,896	62.52	INC	61,014	34.40	49,882
189	Mandya	JD(S)	1,05,253	59.51	INC	67,033	37.90	38,220
190	Shrirangapattana	JD(S)	1,13,843	61.92	INC	65,254	35.49	48,229
191	Nagamangala	JD(S)	1,13,087	61.67	INC	66,576	36.28	46,511
192	Krishnarajpete	JD(S)	1,00,170	55.49	INC	73,648	40.79	26,522
211	Krishnarajanagara	JD(S)	88,995	50.52	INC	82,148	46.64	6,847
Mysore Lok Sabha constituency
208	Madikeri	BJP	1,08,402	60.51	INC	66,994	37.39	41,408
209	Virajpet	BJP	99,804	58.21	INC	67,353	39.28	32,451
210	Periyapatna	INC	82,981	52.09	BJP	71,237	44.72	11,744
212	Hunsur	BJP	95,266	49.32	INC	92,198	47.79	3,068
215	Chamundeshwari	BJP	1,43,327	55.95	INC	1,06,083	41.44	37,244
216	Krishnaraja	BJP	1,04,596	66.54	INC	50,171	31.91	54,425
217	Chamaraja	BJP	1,05,480	67.22	INC	49,083	31.28	56,397
218	Narasimharaja	INC	1,38,876	68.13	BJP	62,279	30.55	76,597
Chamarajanagar Lok Sabha constituency
213	Heggadadevankote (ST)	INC	96,735	54.99	BJP	72,997	41.50	23,738
214	Nanjangud (SC)	INC	92,407	53.85	BJP	71,829	41.86	20,578
219	Varuna	INC	1,07,203	56.73	BJP	73,851	39.08	33,352
220	T. Narasipur (SC)	INC	76,722	53.85	BJP	73,801	41.86	2,921
221	Hanur	INC	96,210	59.10	BJP	59,253	36.63	36,957
222	Kollegal (SC)	INC	95,228	58.13	BJP	62,212	37.98	33,016
223	Chamarajanagar	INC	91,059	53.56	BJP	70,733	41.60	20,236
224	Gundlupet	INC	94,362	52.95	BJP	76,380	42.88	17,982
Bangalore Rural Lok Sabha constituency
131	Kunigal	BJP	97,248	56.12	INC	73,410	42.36	23,438
154	Rajarajeshwarinagar	BJP	1,88,726	66.71	INC	89,729	31.71	98,997
176	Bangalore South	BJP	2,55,756	56.12	INC	1,58,627	37.67	97,129
177	Anekal (SC)	BJP	1,37,693	53.53	INC	1,15,328	44.83	22,365
182	Magadi	BJP	1,13,911	56.69	INC	83,938	41.78	29,973
183	Ramanagara	INC	92,090	49.25	BJP	91,945	49.17	145
184	Kanakpura	INC	1,08,980	55.34	BJP	83,303	42.49	25,677
185	Channapatna	BJP	1,06,971	56.69	INC	85,357	43.62	21,614
Bangalore North Lok Sabha constituency
151	K. R. Pura	BJP	1,48,286	53.37	INC	1,23,185	44.56	25,101
152	Byatarayanapura	BJP	1,64,574	54.76	INC	1,29,523	43.10	35,051
153	Yeshvanthapura	BJP	2,30,416	64.81	INC	1,16,529	32.07	1,13,387
155	Dasarahalli	BJP	1,44,360	64.11	INC	75,166	33.38	69,194
156	Mahalakshmi Layout	BJP	1,04,235	66.80	INC	48,439	30.80	55,796
157	Malleshwaram	BJP	84,895	68.33	INC	36,442	29.30	48,543
158	Hebbal	INC	79,842	49.83	BJP	77,680	48.48	2,162
159	Pulakeshinagar (SC)	INC	1,16,064	79.18	BJP	28,269	19.28	87,795
Bangalore Central Lok Sabha constituency
160	Sarvagnanagar	INC	1,40,794	66.64	BJP	66,550	31.50	74,244
161	C. V. Raman Nagar (SC)	BJP	73,460	56.41	INC	53,346	40.96	20,114
162	Shivajinagar	INC	70,731	61.01	BJP	43,221	37.28	27,521
163	Shanti Nagar	INC	70,184	57.10	BJP	49,846	40.56	20,338
164	Gandhi Nagar	BJP	74,447	57.70	INC	51,123	39.62	23,324
165	Rajaji Nagar	BJP	75,917	65.65	INC	36,488	31.55	39,429
168	Chamrajpet	INC	87,116	64.97	BJP	44,163	32.93	42,153
174	Mahadevapura (SC)	BJP	2,29,632	64.71	INC	1,15,586	32.57	1,15,046
Bangalore South Lok Sabha constituency
166	Govindraj Nagar	BJP	1,02,321	64.20	INC	53,936	33.84	48,385
167	Vijay Nagar	BJP	95,261	59.11	INC	62,721	38.92	32,540
169	Chickpet	INC	66,802	49.66	BJP	65,331	48.57	1,471
170	Basavanagudi	BJP	1,04,580	80.50	INC	22,480	17.30	82,103
171	Padmanabhanagar	BJP	1,08,274	64.71	INC	55,406	33.11	52,868
172	B.T.M Layout	BJP	72,541	52.29	INC	63,192	45.55	9,349
173	Jayanagar	INC	64,580	50.29	BJP	61,705	48.05	2,875
159	Bommanahalli	BJP	1,37,764	60.99	INC	83,637	37.03	54,127
Chikkaballapur Lok Sabha constituency
139	Gauribidanur	BJP	80,523	48.11	INC	80,040	47.82	483
140	Bagepalli	INC	77,587	47.97	BJP	76,491	47.29	996
141	Chikkaballapur	BJP	98,437	54.57	INC	77,496	42.96	20,941
150	Yelahanka	BJP	1,77,008	63.31	INC	93,771	33.53	83,237
178	Hosakote	INC	1,02,200	49.43	BJP	99,866	48.30	2,334
179	Devanahalli (SC)	BJP	89,660	49.69	INC	84,429	46.98	5,231
180	Doddaballapur	BJP	96,680	54.80	INC	74,298	42.03	22,382
181	Nelamangala (SC)	BJP	1,00,923	58.10	INC	67,668	38.95	33,255
Kolar Lok Sabha constituency
142	Sidlaghatta	JD(S)	80,650	48.34	INC	80,227	48.08	483
143	Chintamani	JD(S)	89,456	50.47	INC	82,206	46.38	7,250
144	Srinivaspur	JD(S)	90,443	51.28	INC	80,375	45.56	10,068
145	Mulbagal (SC)	JD(S)	99,620	58.93	INC	63,745	37.70	35,845
146	Kolar Gold Field (SC)	INC	85,876	59.88	JD(S)	52,371	36.52	33,505
147	Bangarapet (SC)	JD(S)	92,360	56.96	INC	64,226	39.61	28,134
148	Kolar	JD(S)	97,837	51.08	INC	88,897	46.41	8,940
149	Malur	JD(S)	86,448	52.46	INC	73,148	44.39	13,300

== Assembly segments wise lead of Parties ==
2024 Karnataka Lok Sabha Elections Assembly Wise Lead Map

Party	Assembly segments		Position in the Assembly
Party	Alliance	Party	Position in the Assembly
Bharatiya Janata Party	142	124	63
Janata Dal (Secular)	142	18	18
Indian National Congress	82	82	138
Sarvodaya Karnataka Paksha	82	0	1
Independent	0	0	4
Total	224		

== See also ==
- 2024 Indian general election in Kerala
- 2024 Indian general election in Ladakh
- 2024 Indian general election in Lakshadweep
