= 2019 Indian general election in Karnataka =

Indian lower house election in Karnataka

- 18,23 April 2019

28 seats
- Turnout: 68.81% (▲1.61%)
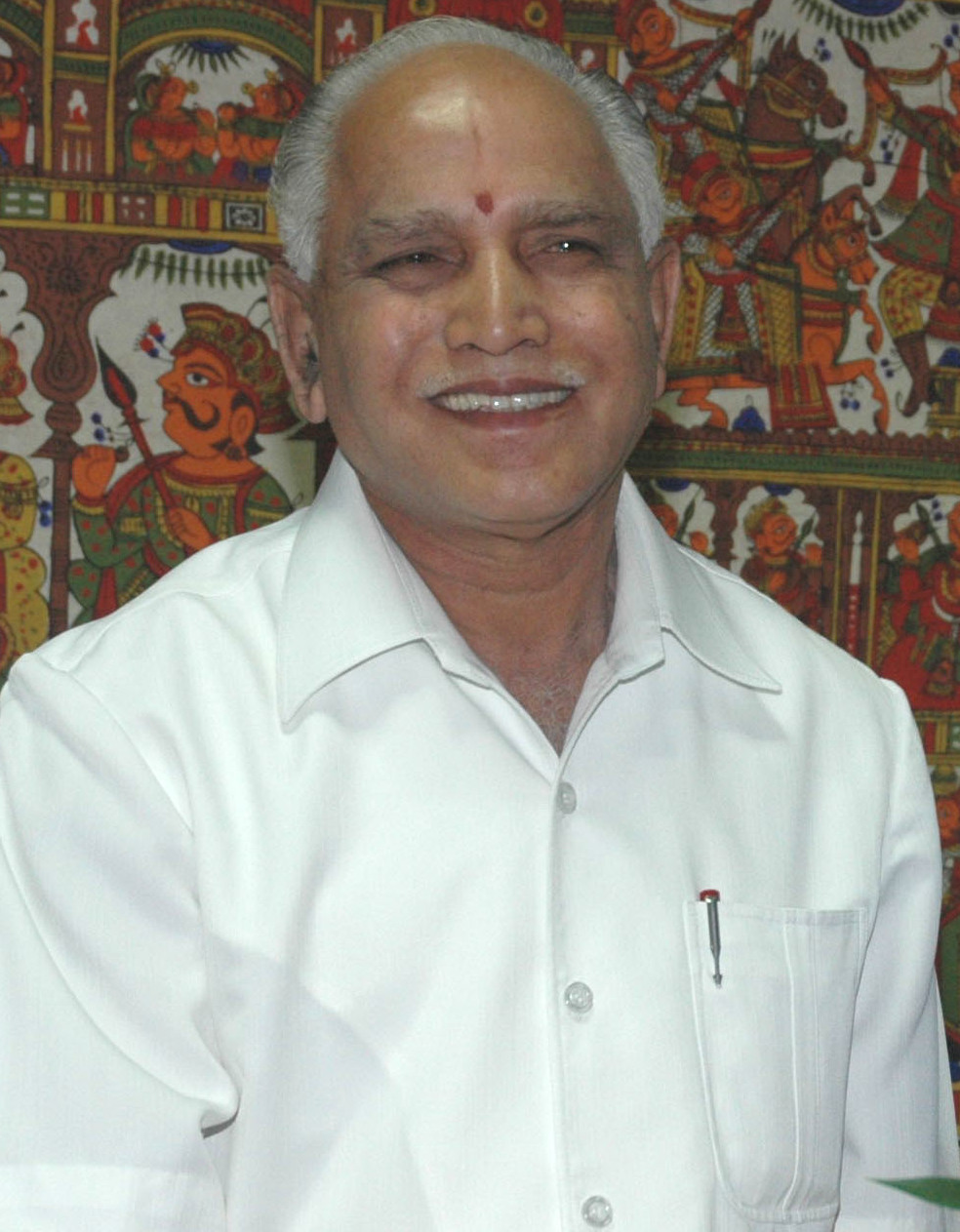

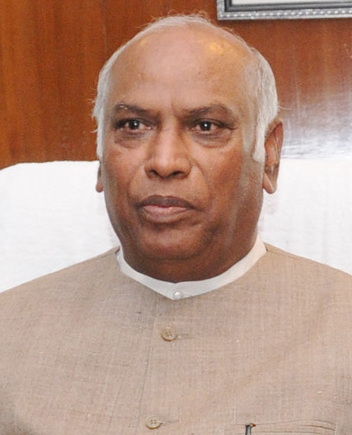

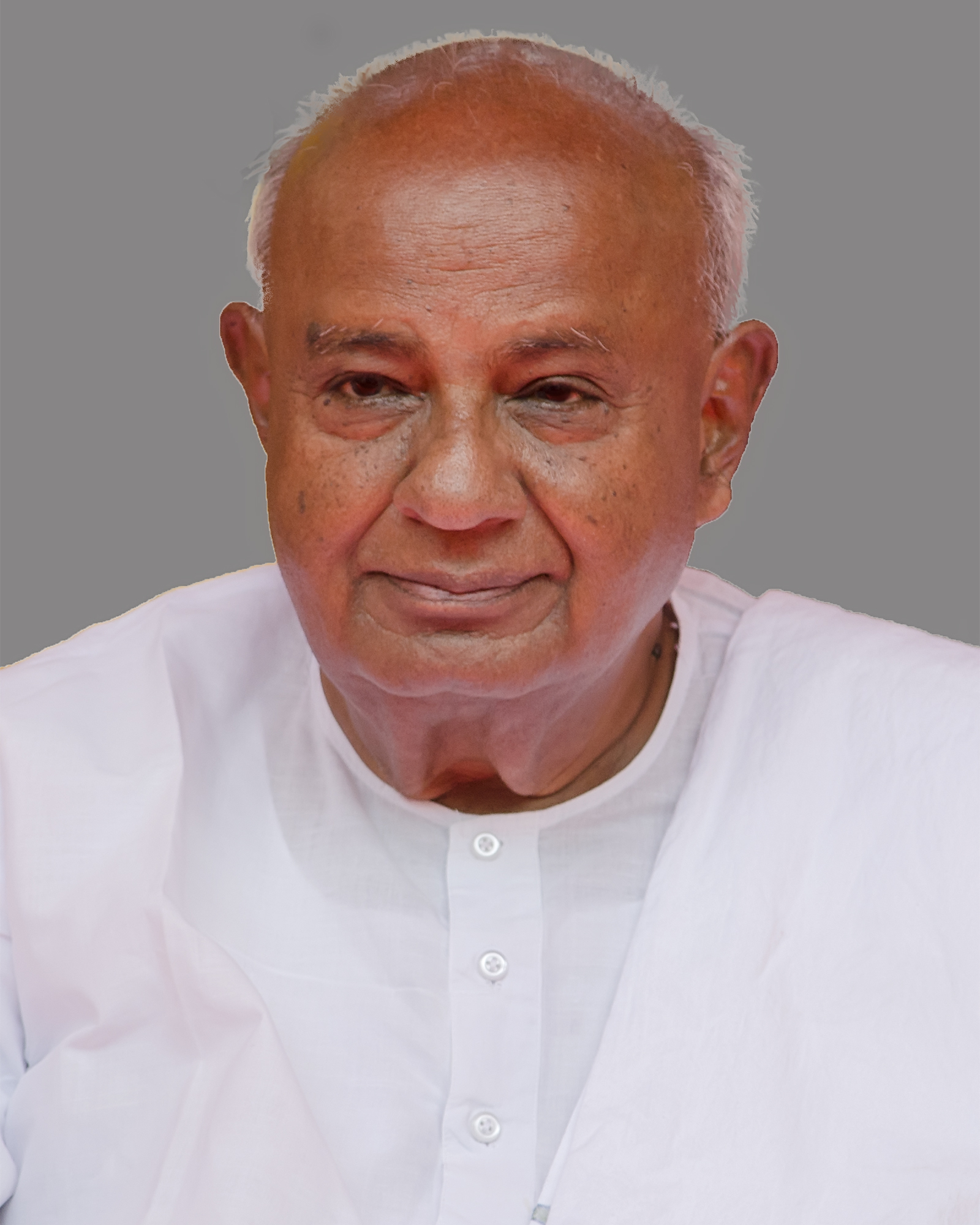
	First party	Second party	Third party
Leader	B. S. Yediyurappa	Mallikarjun Kharge	H. D. Deve Gowda
Party	BJP	INC	JD(S)
Alliance	NDA	UPA	UPA
Leader's seat	Did not contest	Gulbarga (lost)	Tumkur (lost)
Last election	17	9	2
Seats won	25	1	1
Seat change	▲8	▼8	▼1
Percentage	51.38%	31.88%	9.67%
Swing	▲8.38%	▼8.12%	▼1.33%
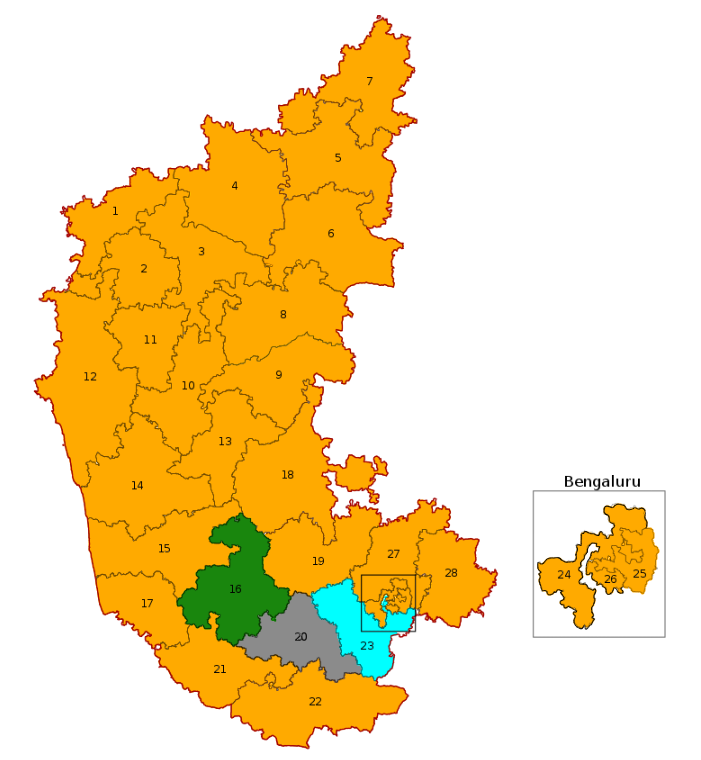
- Karnataka
Prime Minister before election
Narendra Modi
BJP
Prime Minister after election
Narendra Modi
BJP

The 2019 Indian general election were held in Karnataka on Two phases- 18 and 23 April 2019 to constitute the 17th Lok Sabha.

Lok Sabha constituencies in Karnataka

== National Democratic Alliance ==
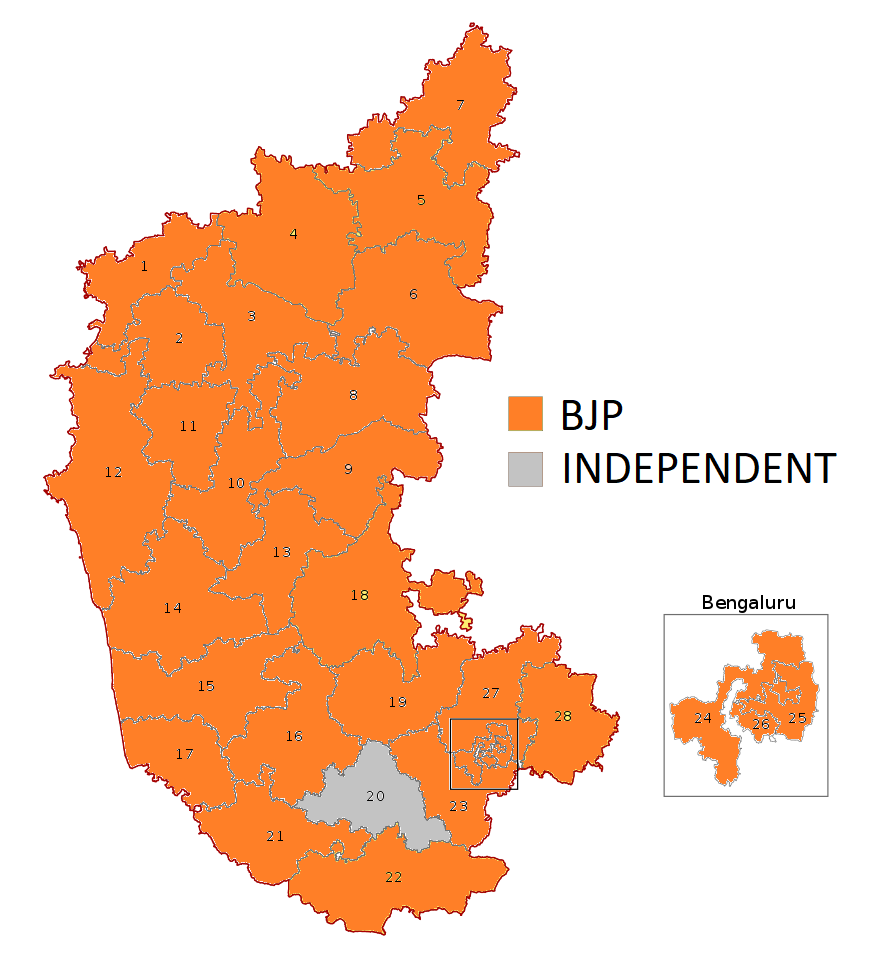
Karnataka NDA seat sharing map

National Democratic Alliance
Party	Flag	Symbol	Leader	Seats
Bharatiya Janata Party			B. S. Yediyurappa	27
Independent politician			Sumalatha Ambareesh	1
Total				28

=== BJP support for Sumalatha Ambareesh ===
During the 2019 Indian general election, the Bharatiya Janata Party (BJP) chose not to field a candidate in the Mandya Lok Sabha constituency and instead extended support to independent candidate Sumalatha Ambareesh. The decision was aimed at consolidating the anti-government vote against the Congress–JD(S) alliance, whose candidate was Nikhil Kumaraswamy, son of Chief Minister H. D. Kumaraswamy and grandson of former Prime Minister H. D. Deve Gowda. Mandya was regarded as a prestige constituency for the JD(S).

Sumalatha, the widow of Kannada actor and former Congress MP Ambareesh, entered the election as an independent after the Congress allotted the Mandya seat to its alliance partner, the JD(S). Although she met senior BJP leader S. M. Krishna, she chose not to contest on a BJP ticket. Her campaign received support from several leading Kannada film actors, including Yash, Darshan, and Sudeep, while some local Congress workers also backed her despite the alliance.

In the election, Sumalatha Ambareesh defeated Nikhil Kumaraswamy by 125,876 votes. Her victory was considered a major setback for the Congress–JD(S) alliance and a significant political success for the BJP's strategy of supporting an independent candidate without contesting the seat.

== United Progressive Alliance ==
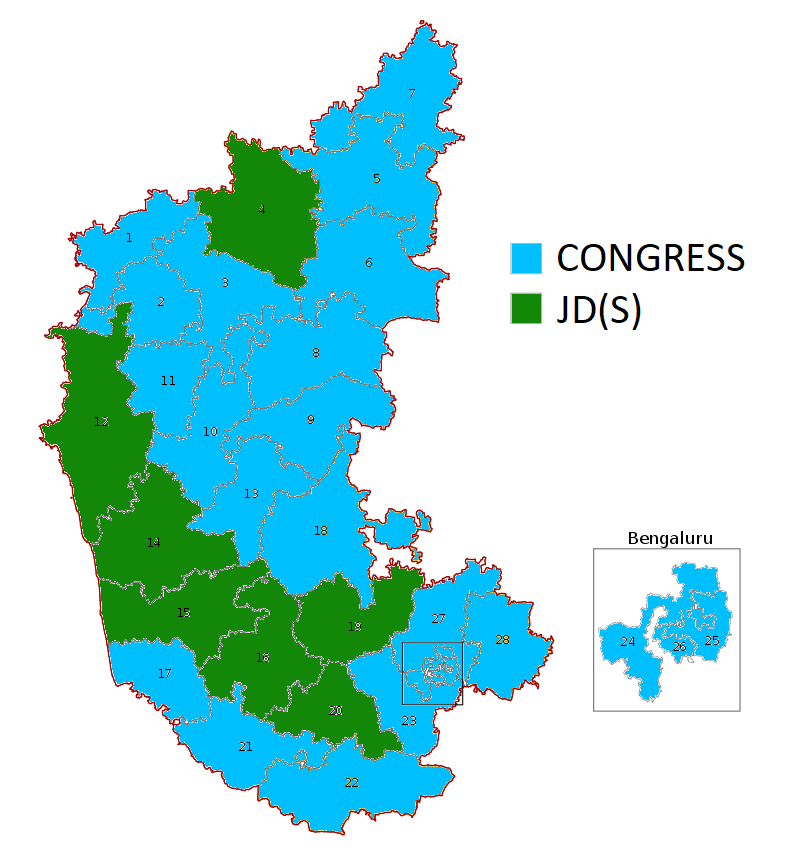
Karnataka INC + JD(S) seat sharing map

United Progressive Alliance
Party	Flag	Symbol	Leader	Seats
Indian National Congress			Mallikarjun Kharge	21
Janata Dal (Secular)			H. D. Kumaraswamy	7
Total				28

The Congress–Janata Dal (Secular) (JD(S)) alliance contested the 2019 Indian general election in Karnataka as a pre-poll coalition against the Bharatiya Janata Party (BJP). The alliance was formed after the Congress supported the JD(S) in forming the Karnataka government following the 2018 Karnataka Legislative Assembly election. Under the arrangement, H. D. Kumaraswamy served as Chief Minister while the Congress became the junior coalition partner. The two parties announced that they would jointly contest the 2019 Lok Sabha election in an attempt to consolidate anti-BJP votes in the state.

The alliance entered the election with a seat-sharing agreement under which the Congress contested 21 of Karnataka's 28 Lok Sabha constituencies, while the JD(S) contested the remaining 7. A coalition coordination and monitoring committee, chaired by former Chief Minister Siddaramaiah with JD(S) leader Danish Ali as convenor, was created to coordinate governance and election strategy. The alliance expected effective transfer of votes between Congress and JD(S) supporters in constituencies contested by either partner.

During the election campaign, the alliance highlighted its governance record in Karnataka and campaigned jointly against the BJP. However, the coalition remained under strain due to ideological differences, internal factionalism and disagreements over seat-sharing. Several Congress leaders and workers expressed dissatisfaction over constituencies allotted to the JD(S), while reports emerged of local leaders refusing to campaign wholeheartedly for alliance candidates. Prime Minister Narendra Modi repeatedly criticised the coalition, describing it as a "20 per cent commission government" and accusing it of corruption and dynastic politics. BJP leaders also alleged that the coalition government lacked stability.

The alliance suffered a heavy defeat in the election. The BJP won 25 of Karnataka's 28 Lok Sabha seats, while the Congress retained only Bengaluru Rural, where D. K. Suresh was re-elected. The JD(S) retained only Hassan, where Prajwal Revanna won his maiden parliamentary election. Independent candidate Sumalatha Ambareesh, backed by the BJP, won the Mandya constituency.

The alliance's poor performance was widely attributed to ineffective vote transfer between Congress and JD(S) supporters, dissatisfaction among party workers over the seat-sharing arrangement, and continuing internal conflicts within the coalition government. The results led to renewed speculation about the stability of the Congress–JD(S) government in Karnataka, with reports suggesting that disgruntled legislators from both parties could defect to the BJP. The defeat significantly weakened the coalition and marked one of the BJP's strongest electoral performances in Karnataka.

During the 2019 Indian general election in Karnataka, the Indian National Congress allotted the Tumakuru Lok Sabha constituency to its alliance partner, the Janata Dal (Secular), under the seat-sharing agreement. Former Prime Minister H. D. Deve Gowda contested from Tumakuru after vacating his traditional Hassan constituency for his grandson Prajwal Revanna. The decision led to a rebellion by sitting Congress MP S. P. Muddahanumegowda, who filed his nomination as an independent despite party directives to withdraw.

The Janata Dal (Secular) later requested the Congress to contest the Bengaluru North constituency, stating that it was unable to identify a suitable candidate. The Congress subsequently fielded state minister Krishna Byre Gowda against the BJP's sitting MP and Union Minister D. V. Sadananda Gowda. In the election, D. V. Sadananda Gowda retained the seat, defeating Krishna Byre Gowda by 147,518 votes.

== Voter's Turnout ==
First phase election on 18 April with highest voting recorded in Mandya of 80.24% and the lowest is recorded in Bangalore South of 53.48% as per the official announcement from Election CEO of Karnataka.

Poll Date	State	No. of. Seats	Turnout (%)
18 Apr 2019	Karnataka - Phase 1	14	68.96 ▲
23 Apr 2019	Karnataka - Phase 2	14	68.66 ▲

== Candidates ==
=== List of Candidates ===
Constituency		NDA		UPA	
#	Name	Party	Candidate	Party	Candidate
1	Chikkodi	BJP	Annasaheb Jolle	INC	Prakash Hukkeri (Note: Sitting MP from Chikkodi; Former five-time MLA from Hukkeri; Served as Karnataka Minister for Sugar and Agriculture Marketing; Senior Congress leader from Belagavi district.)
2	Belgaum	BJP	Suresh Angadi	INC	Virupakshi Sadhunavar (Note: Industrialist and educationist; Contested his first Lok Sabha election; Former independent candidate in the 2015 MLC election; Faced BJP MP Suresh Angadi.)
3	Bagalkot	BJP	P. C. Gaddigoudar	INC	Veena Kashappanavar (Note: Former Zilla Panchayat member; Wife of former MLA Vijayanand Kashappanavar; Only woman candidate fielded by Congress in Karnataka; Represented the Panchamashali Lingayat community.)
4	Bijapur (SC)	BJP	Ramesh Jigajinagi	JD(S)	Sunitha D. Chavan (Note: Wife of Nagthan MLA Devanand Chavan; Made her electoral debut in 2019; Only woman candidate fielded by JD(S); Contested against BJP's Ramesh Jigajinagi.)
5	Gulbarga (SC)	BJP	Umesh. G. Jadhav	INC	Mallikarjun Kharge (Note: Senior Congress leader and Leader of Opposition in Lok Sabha; Two-time MP from Kalaburgi; Former Union Minister for Railways and Labour; Nine-time MLA from Gurmitkal.)
6	Raichur (ST)	BJP	Raja Amresh Nayak	INC	B. V. Nayak (Note: Sitting MP from Raichur; Son of former four-time MP Venkatesh Nayak; Belongs to an influential political family; Won the constituency in 2014.)
7	Bidar	BJP	Bhagwanth Khuba	INC	Eshwara Khandre (Note: Working President of KPCC; Son of senior Congress leader Bhimappa Khandre; Senior Lingayat leader from Bidar district; Faced BJP MP Bhagwanth Khuba.)
8	Koppal	BJP	Karadi Amarappa	INC	Rajashekar Hitnal
9	Bellary (ST)	BJP	Devendrappa	INC	V. S. Ugrappa (Note: Sitting MP after winning the 2018 by-election; Senior Congress leader and advocate; Close associate of Siddaramaiah; Belongs to the Valmiki community.)
10	Haveri	BJP	S. C. Udasi	INC	D. R. Patil (Note: Former four-time Member of Parliament; Veteran Congress leader from Gadag region; Belongs to the Reddy-Lingayat community; Contested from Haveri after constituency delimitation.)
11	Dharwad	BJP	Pralhad Joshi	INC	Vinay Kulkarni (Note: Former Karnataka Minister; Prominent Lingayat leader; Contested the 2014 Lok Sabha election; Loyalist of former Chief Minister Siddaramaiah.)
12	Uttara Kannada	BJP	Anant Kumar Hegde	JD(S)	Anand Asnotikar (Note: Former BJP and Congress leader; Served as Karnataka Minister; Joined JD(S) before the 2019 election; Contested against Anantkumar Hegde.)
13	Davanagere	BJP	G. M. Siddeshwara	INC	H. B. Manjappa (Note: President of Davangere District Congress Committee; Chosen after the party changed its original candidate; Senior Congress organiser in the district.)
14	Shimoga	BJP	B. Y. Raghavendra	JD(S)	Madhu Bangarappa (Note: Son of former Chief Minister S. Bangarappa; Former MLA from Sorab; Actor and film producer; Contested Shivamogga for the second time within six months.)
15	Udupi Chikmagalur	BJP	Shobha Karandlaje	JD(S)	Pramod Madhwaraj (Note: Former Karnataka Minister; Former Congress leader; Businessman from Udupi; Contested on a JD(S) ticket under the alliance.)
16	Hassan	BJP	A. Manju	JD(S)	Prajwal Revanna (Note: Son of H. D. Revanna; Grandson of H. D. Deve Gowda; JD(S) General Secretary; One of the youngest candidates in Karnataka.)
17	Dakshina Kannada	BJP	Nalin Kumar Kateel	INC	Mithun Rai (Note: President of Dakshina Kannada Youth Congress; Young Congress leader from Mangaluru; Known for promoting local cultural traditions; Backed by D. K. Shivakumar.)
18	Chitradurga (SC)	BJP	A. Narayana Swamy	INC	B. N. Chandrappa (Note: Sitting MP from Chitradurga; Long-time Congress leader; Former Chairman of Karnataka LIDKAR; Associated with the party since 1989.)
19	Tumkur	BJP	G. S. Basavaraj	JD(S)	H. D. Deve Gowda (Note: Former Prime Minister of India; Former Chief Minister of Karnataka; National President of JD(S); Shifted from Hassan to Tumakuru.)
20	Mandya	IND	Sumalatha	JD(S)	Nikhil Gowda (Note: Son of Chief Minister H. D. Kumaraswamy; Grandson of H. D. Deve Gowda; Kannada film actor turned politician; Made his electoral debut in 2019.)
21	Mysore	BJP	Pratap Simha	INC	C. H. Vijayashankar (Note: Former two-time Member of Parliament; Returned to Congress after leaving BJP; Veteran politician from Mysuru region; Contested against BJP MP Pratap Simha.)
22	Chamarajanagar (SC)	BJP	Srinivasa Prasad	INC	R. Dhruvanarayana (Note: Sitting MP from Chamarajanagar; Two-time Member of Parliament; Senior Congress leader from the region; Faced V. Srinivasa Prasad.)
23	Bangalore Rural	BJP	Ashwath Narayana Gowda	INC	D. K. Suresh (Note: Sitting MP from Bengaluru Rural; Brother of Congress leader D. K. Shivakumar; First elected in the 2013 by-election; Retained the seat in 2014.)
24	Bangalore North	BJP	D. V. Sadananda Gowda	INC	Krishna Byre Gowda (Note: Karnataka Minister for Law and Parliamentary Affairs; Second-generation politician; Former Agriculture Minister; Five-time MLA.)
25	Bangalore Central	BJP	P. C. Mohan	INC	Rizwan Arshad (Note: Chairman of KPCC Communications Department; Contested the constituency for the second time; Young Congress leader from Bengaluru; Relied on JD(S) alliance support.)
26	Bangalore South	BJP	Tejasvi Surya	INC	B. K. Hariprasad (Note: Senior Congress leader and Rajya Sabha MP; Former AICC General Secretary; Earlier contested against Ananth Kumar; Veteran parliamentarian.)
27	Chikballapur	BJP	B. N. Bache Gowda	INC	Veerappa Moily (Note: Former Chief Minister of Karnataka; Former Union Cabinet Minister; Senior Congress strategist and author; Represented Chikkaballapura since 2009.)
28	Kolar (SC)	BJP	S. Muniswamy	INC	K. H. Muniyappa (Note: Seven-time Member of Parliament; Former Union Minister of State; One of Congress's longest-serving MPs; Represented Kolar continuously since 1991.)

== Opinion Polls ==
Date published	Polling agency			Lead
Date published	Polling agency	NDA	INC + JD(S)	Lead
Jan 2019	Spick Media	13	15	2
Jan 2019	CVoter	14	14	–

Date published	Polling agency			Others	Lead
Date published	Polling agency	NDA	INC + JD(S)	Others	Lead
Jan 2019	CVoter	44%	47.9%	8.1%	3.9%

== Results ==
BJP won 25 seats. INC won 1 seat and JD(S) won 1 seat .Independent (Supported by BJP) Won 1 Seat.

25	1	1	1
BJP	INC	JD(S)	IND

=== Coalition wise - Party result ===
Parties	Alliance	Parties Contested seats	Alliance contested seats	Seats won
Bharatiya Janata Party	National Democratic Alliance	27	28	25
Sumalatha (Independent)	National Democratic Alliance	1	28	1
Indian National Congress	INC + JD(S)	21	28	1
Janata Dal (Secular)	INC + JD(S)	7	28	1

=== Party wise ===
Alliance/ Party		Popular vote			Seats		
Alliance/ Party		Votes	%	±pp	Contested	Won	+/−
NDA	BJP	1,80,53,454	51.38	▲8.38	27	25	▲8
NDA	IND	7,03,660	2.00	Steady	1	1	▲1
NDA	Total	1,87,57,114	53.38	Steady	28	26	Steady
UPA	INC	1,12,03,016	31.88	▼8.92	21	1	▼8
UPA	JD(S)	33,97,229	9.67	▼1.33	7	1	▼1
UPA	Total	1,46,00,245	41.55	Steady	28	2	Steady
Others		8,66,332	2.47	Steady	158	0	Steady
IND		6,64,181	1.89	Steady	265	0	Steady
NOTA		2,50,810	0.71	Steady			
Total		3,51,38,682	100%	-	507	28	-

=== Constituency-wise results ===
Constituency		Winner				Runner Up				Margin	%
#	Name	Candidate	Party	Votes	%	Candidate	Party	Votes	%	Margin	%
1	Chikkodi	A. Shankar Jolle	BJP	645,017	52.89	Prakash Hukkeri	INC	526,140	43.14	118,877	9.75
2	Belgaum	Suresh Angadi	BJP	761,991	63.12	Dr. Sadhunavar	INC	370,687	30.71	391,304	32.41
3	Bagalkot	P. C. Gaddigoudar	BJP	664,638	55.17	Veena Kashappanavar	INC	496,451	41.21	168,187	13.96
4	Bijapur	Ramesh Jigajinagi	BJP	635,867	57.16	Sunita D. Chavan	JD(S)	377,829	33.96	258,038	23.20
5	Gulbarga	Umesh. G. Jadhav	BJP	620,192	52.10	Mallikarjun Kharge	INC	524,740	44.08	95,452	8.02
6	Raichur	Raja Amareshwara	BJP	598,337	53.19	B. V. Nayak	INC	480,621	42.72	117,716	10.47
7	Bidar	Bhagwanth Khuba	BJP	585,471	52.36	Eshwara Khandre	INC	468,637	41.91	116,834	10.45
8	Koppal	K. S. Amarappa	BJP	586,783	49.28	Basavaraj Hitnal	INC	548,386	46.06	38,397	3.22
9	Bellary	Devendrappa	BJP	616,388	50.44	V. S. Ugrappa	INC	560,681	45.88	55,707	4.56
10	Haveri	S. C. Udasi	BJP	683,660	53.92	D. R. Patil	INC	542,778	42.81	140,882	11.11
11	Dharwad	Pralhad Joshi	BJP	684,837	56.41	Vinay Kulkarni	INC	479,765	39.51	205,072	16.90
12	Uttara Kannada	Anantkumar Hegde	BJP	786,042	68.09	Anand Asnotikar	JD(S)	306,393	26.54	479,649	41.55
13	Davanagere	G. M. Siddeshwara	BJP	652,996	54.63	H. B. Manjappa	INC	483,294	40.44	169,702	14.19
14	Shimoga	B. Y. Raghavendra	BJP	729,872	56.84	Madhu Bangarappa	JD(S)	506,512	39.45	223,360	17.39
15	Udupi Chikmagalur	Shobha Karandlaje	BJP	718,916	62.43	Pramod Madhwaraj	JD(S)	369,317	32.07	349,599	30.36
16	Hassan	Prajwal Revanna	JD(S)	676,606	52.92	A. Manju	BJP	535,282	41.86	141,324	11.06
17	Dakshina Kannada	Nalin Kumar Kateel	BJP	774,285	57.55	Mithun M. Rai	INC	499,664	37.14	274,621	20.41
18	Chitradurga	A. Narayanaswamy	BJP	626,195	50.24	B. N. Chandrappa	INC	546,017	43.80	80,178	6.44
19	Tumkur	G. S. Basavaraj	BJP	596,127	47.86	H. D. Devegowda	JD(S)	582,788	46.79	13,339	1.07
20	Mandya	Sumalatha Ambareesh	IND	703,660	51.00	Nikhil Kumaraswamy	JD(S)	577,784	41.88	125,876	9.12
21	Mysore	Prathap Simha	BJP	688,974	52.27	C. H. Vijayashankar	INC	550,327	41.75	138,647	10.52
22	Chamarajanagar	V. Srinivas Prasad	BJP	568,537	44.74	R. Dhruvanarayana	INC	566,720	44.60	1,817	0.14
23	Bangalore Rural	D. K. Suresh	INC	878,258	54.12	Ashwath N. Gowda	BJP	671,388	41.37	206,870	12.75
24	Bangalore North	D. V. Sadananda	BJP	824,500	52.84	Krishna Byregowda	INC	676,982	43.39	147,518	9.45
25	Bangalore Central	P. C. Mohan	BJP	602,853	50.33	Rizwan Arshad	INC	531,885	44.41	70,968	5.92
26	Bangalore South	Tejasvi Surya	BJP	739,229	62.14	B. K. Hariprasad	INC	408,037	34.30	331,192	27.84
27	Chikkballapur	B. N. Bache Gowda	BJP	745,912	53.74	M. Veerappa Moily	INC	563,802	40.62	182,110	13.12
28	Kolar	S. Muniswamy	BJP	709,165	56.32	K. H. Muniyappa	INC	499,144	39.64	210,021	16.68

== By-Polls Held ==
Source
Constituency			Winner				Runner Up				Margin
No.	Name	Date	Candidate	Party	Votes	%	Candidate	Party	Votes	%	Margin
2	Belgaum	17 April 2021	Mangala Angadi	BJP	440,327	43.07	Satish Jarkiholi	INC	435,087	42.56	5,240
2	Belgaum	17 April 2021	The Belgaum Lok Sabha bypoll was held following the death of the incumbent MP, Suresh Angadi.								

== Post-election Union Council of Ministers from Karnataka ==
#	Name	Constituency	Designation	Department	From	To	Party
1	Nirmala Sitharaman	Rajya Sabha (Karnataka)	Cabinet Minister	Minister of Finance; Minister of Corporate Affairs	31 May 2019	9 June 2024	BJP
2	Pralhad Joshi	Dharwad	Cabinet Minister	Minister of Parliamentary Affairs; Minister of Coal; Minister of Mines	31 May 2019	9 June 2024	BJP
3	D. V. Sadananda Gowda	Bangalore North	Cabinet Minister	Minister of Chemicals and Fertilizers	31 May 2019	7 July 2021	BJP
4	Suresh Angadi	Belgaum	MoS	Ministry of Railways	31 May 2019	23 September 2020 (Died)	BJP
5	Rajeev Chandrasekhar	Rajya Sabha (Karnataka)	MoS	Ministry of Skill Development and Entrepreneurship; Ministry of Electronics and Information Technology; Ministry of Jal Shakti (Addl. Charge from Dec 2023)	7 July 2021	9 June 2024	BJP
6	Shobha Karandlaje	Udupi Chikmagalur	MoS	Ministry of Agriculture and Farmers' Welfare; Ministry of Food Processing Industries (Addl. Charge from Dec 2023)	7 July 2021	9 June 2024	BJP
7	A. Narayanaswamy	Chitradurga (SC)	MoS	Ministry of Social Justice and Empowerment	7 July 2021	9 June 2024	BJP
8	Bhagwanth Khuba	Bidar	MoS	Ministry of Chemicals and Fertilizers; Ministry of New and Renewable Energy	7 July 2021	9 June 2024	BJP

== Assembly segments wise lead of Parties ==

Party	Assembly segments	Position in Assembly
Bharatiya Janata Party	170	104
Indian National Congress	36	80
Janata Dal (Secular)	11	37
Others	7	3
Total	224	
