= Kalmala Assembly constituency =

Former Assembly constituency in Karnataka, India

Coordinates: 16.198994°N 77.206282°E

Kalmala
- Former constituency for the Karnataka Legislative Assembly

Constituency details
- Country: India
- Region: South India
- State: Karnataka
- Division: Gulbarga
- District: Raichur
- Lok Sabha constituency: Raichur
- Established: 1962
- Abolished: 2008
- Reservation: None

Kalmala Assembly constituency was one of the constituencies in Karnataka state assembly in India until 2008 when it was made defunct. It was part of Raichur Lok Sabha constituency.

== Members of the Legislative Assembly ==
Election	Member	Party
1962	Nagamma	Indian National Congress
1967	N. Seshappa	Indian National Congress
1972	Shivanna Bheemappa	Indian National Congress
1978	Sudhendra Rao Kasbe	Indian National Congress
1983	Sudhendra Rao Kasbe	Indian National Congress
1985	Krishnamurthy	Janata Party
1989	K. Bheemanna	Independent politician
1994	B. Muddappa Muniyappa	Janata Dal
1999	Raja Amareshwara Naik	Indian National Congress
2004	B. Muddappa Muniyappa	Janata Dal

== Election results ==
=== Assembly Election 2004 ===
2004 Karnataka Legislative Assembly election : Kalmala
Party	Candidate	Votes	%	±%
JD(S)	Muniyappa Muddappa. B	30,915	28.53%	▲10.12
BJP	Shankaragouda Harvi	27,444	25.33%	▼6.75
INC	Raja Amareshwara Naik	26,597	24.55%	▼9.51
JP	Sharanappa Kalmala	14,688	13.56%	New
BSP	Sharanamma Devamitra Garaladinni	2,939	2.71%	▲0.44
Independent	Bajareppa	2,538	2.34%	New
Urs Samyuktha Paksha	Robert Rajshekar	1,724	1.59%	New
Kannada Nadu Party	Veerana Matamari. M	1,507	1.39%	New
Margin of victory		3,471	3.20%	▲1.21
Turnout		108,367	58.32%	▲2.79
Total valid votes		108,352		
Registered electors		185,818		▲16.36
JD(S) gain from INC		Swing	▼5.53	

=== Assembly Election 1999 ===
1999 Karnataka Legislative Assembly election : Kalmala
Party	Candidate	Votes	%	±%
INC	Raja Amareshwara Naik	27,691	34.06%	▲9.67
BJP	Shankaragouda Harvi	26,077	32.08%	▲27.67
JD(S)	B. Muniyappa	14,968	18.41%	New
Independent	Devamitra	4,018	4.94%	New
Independent	Anthony Mathew	3,002	3.69%	New
Independent	Raja Panduranga Nayak	2,303	2.83%	New
BSP	Shiva Reddy	1,849	2.27%	▲0.88
Independent	Sakhamuru Ramagopal	1,153	1.42%	New
Margin of victory		1,614	1.99%	▼12.58
Turnout		88,683	55.53%	▼5.30
Total valid votes		81,294		
Rejected ballots		7,302	8.23%	▲3.94
Registered electors		159,697		▲12.01
INC gain from JD		Swing	▼4.90	

=== Assembly Election 1994 ===
1994 Karnataka Legislative Assembly election : Kalmala
Party	Candidate	Votes	%	±%
JD	B. Muniyappa	32,332	38.96%	▲6.57
INC	Basavaraj Patel Sirwar	20,244	24.39%	New
KRRS	Shankaragouda Harvi	14,602	17.59%	New
Independent	K. Bhimanna	4,592	5.53%	New
BJP	Sudhendra Rao Kasbe	3,661	4.41%	New
INC	K. Muddurangappa	2,729	3.29%	New
JP	Balappa Tippanna Shakhapur	1,923	2.32%	New
Independent	B. Rangareddy	1,274	1.54%	New
BSP	K. Shivakumar Nayak	1,154	1.39%	New
Margin of victory		12,088	14.57%	▲14.27
Turnout		86,725	60.83%	▲7.07
Total valid votes		82,992		
Rejected ballots		3,718	4.29%	▼6.36
Registered electors		142,571		▲11.40
JD gain from Independent		Swing	▲6.27	

=== Assembly Election 1989 ===
1989 Karnataka Legislative Assembly election : Kalmala
Party	Candidate	Votes	%	±%
Independent	K. Bheemanna	20,094	32.69%	New
JD	B. Muniyappa	19,909	32.39%	New
JP	Krishnamurthy	10,404	16.92%	New
Kranti Sabha	Shankaragouda Harvi	8,115	13.20%	New
Independent	Parasmal Sukhany	938	1.53%	New
Independent	Prem Raj Jain Huliseth	411	0.67%	New
Margin of victory		185	0.30%	▼3.77
Turnout		68,800	53.76%	▼3.28
Total valid votes		61,474		
Rejected ballots		7,326	10.65%	▲6.47
Registered electors		127,982		▲31.04
Independent gain from JP		Swing	▼18.56	

=== Assembly Election 1985 ===
1985 Karnataka Legislative Assembly election : Kalmala
Party	Candidate	Votes	%	±%
JP	Krishnamurthy	27,355	51.25%	▲11.40
INC	Parasmal Sukhany	25,181	47.17%	▼1.07
Independent	Samon Jemis	842	1.58%	New
Margin of victory		2,174	4.07%	▼4.32
Turnout		55,709	57.04%	▲4.84
Total valid votes		53,378		
Rejected ballots		2,331	4.18%	▼1.51
Registered electors		97,668		▲18.84
JP gain from INC		Swing	▲3.01	

=== Assembly Election 1983 ===
1983 Karnataka Legislative Assembly election : Kalmala
Party	Candidate	Votes	%	±%
INC	Sudhendra Rao Kasbe	19,519	48.24%	▲31.22
JP	Krishnamurthy	16,124	39.85%	▲8.77
Independent	Deviputra	2,035	5.03%	New
Independent	Besavalingayya	1,455	3.60%	New
Independent	Sawarappa	1,328	3.28%	New
Margin of victory		3,395	8.39%	▼10.70
Turnout		42,902	52.20%	▼1.22
Total valid votes		40,461		
Rejected ballots		2,441	5.69%	▲0.32
Registered electors		82,187		▲8.00
INC gain from INC(I)		Swing	▼1.93	

=== Assembly Election 1978 ===
1978 Karnataka Legislative Assembly election : Kalmala
Party	Candidate	Votes	%	±%
INC(I)	Sudhendra Rao Kasbe	19,301	50.17%	New
JP	Muniyappa Muddappa. B	11,957	31.08%	New
INC	Dod Gagappa Eashwarappa	6,546	17.02%	▼43.36
Independent	Devendrappa Rayappa	666	1.73%	New
Margin of victory		7,344	19.09%	▼7.19
Turnout		40,654	53.42%	▲21.26
Total valid votes		38,470		
Rejected ballots		2,184	5.37%	▲5.37
Registered electors		76,099		▲26.75
INC(I) gain from INC		Swing	▼10.21	

=== Assembly Election 1972 ===
1972 Mysore State Legislative Assembly election : Kalmala
Party	Candidate	Votes	%	±%
INC	Shivanna Bheemappa	11,167	60.38%	▼0.90
INC(O)	B. Nagamma Seshappa	6,307	34.10%	New
Independent	Omdas Laxmayya Aged	659	3.56%	New
SWA	Narsappa Hemavati	363	1.96%	New
Margin of victory		4,860	26.28%	▼7.53
Turnout		19,307	32.16%	▲12.14
Total valid votes		18,496		
Registered electors		60,037		▲14.40
INC hold		Swing	▼0.90	

=== Assembly Election 1967 ===
1967 Mysore State Legislative Assembly election : Kalmala
Party	Candidate	Votes	%	±%
INC	N. Seshappa	6,001	61.28%	▼7.07
Independent	B. Kristappa	2,690	27.47%	New
Independent	N. Narasappa	1,102	11.25%	New
Margin of victory		3,311	33.81%	▼6.49
Turnout		10,506	20.02%	▼2.84
Total valid votes		9,793		
Registered electors		52,482		▲3.75
INC hold		Swing	▼7.07	

=== Assembly Election 1962 ===
1962 Mysore State Legislative Assembly election : Kalmala
Party	Candidate	Votes	%	±%
INC	Nagamma	7,396	68.35%	New
Lok Sewak Sangh	B. Bheemayya	3,035	28.05%	New
Independent	Guddayana Tippaga	390	3.60%	New
Margin of victory		4,361	40.30%	
Turnout		11,561	22.86%	
Total valid votes		10,821		
Registered electors		50,584		
INC win (new seat)				

== See also ==
- List of constituencies of the Karnataka Legislative Assembly
