= Yadgir Lok Sabha constituency =

Former constituency of the Indian parliament in Hyderabad state

Coordinates: 16.76°N 77.14°E

Yadgir
- Former Lok Sabha constituency

Constituency details
- Country: India
- State: Hyderabad
- Established: 1951
- Abolished: 1956
- Reservation: None

Yadgir Lok Sabha constituency was a former Lok Sabha constituency in Hyderabad State. This seat came into existence in 1951. With the implementation of States Reorganisation Act, 1956, it ceased to exist.

== Assembly segments ==
Yadgir Lok Sabha constituency comprised the following seven Legislative Assembly segments:

1. Raichur
2. Deodurg
3. Shorapur
4. Andole Jewargi
5. Tandur Serum
6. Yadgir
7. Shahpur

After Raichur district and Kalaburagi district of erstwhile Hyderabad State got merged with Mysore State in 1956, this seat ceased to exist and was replaced by Raichur Lok Sabha constituency.

== Members of Parliament ==
- 1952: Krishnacharya Joshi, Indian National Congress

== See also ==
- Raichur Lok Sabha constituency
- Gulbarga Lok Sabha constituency
- Koppal Lok Sabha constituency
- Kalaburagi district
- Raichur district
- List of former constituencies of the Lok Sabha
