= Karemma Nayak =

Indian politician

Karemma Nayak is an Indian politician from Karnataka, India. She is a first-time member of the Karnataka Legislative Assembly representing Devadurga Assembly constituency, which is reserved for Scheduled Tribe community, in Raichur district. She won the 2023 Karnataka Legislative assembly election representing the Janata Dal (S).

== Background ==
Karemma is from an agricultural family in Raichur district. She has been fighting in the Hyderabad-Karnataka region on issues like malnutrition and against land grabbers. She has been facing threats from land mafia and she was allegedly been implicated in many false cases.

In September 2023, she opposed JD(S) support to BJP. In June 2023, she was allegedly attacked by a mob at Bandegud tanda in the Raichur district.

== Career ==
She began her political life in 2005, when she was the president of the Mustur Gram Panchayat. She won from Devadurga Assembly constituency representing Janata Dal (S) in the 2023 Karnataka Legislative Assembly election. She polled 99,544 votes and defeated her nearest rival and former minister K. Shivanagouda Nayak of the Bharatiya Janata Party, by a margin of 34,256 votes. Earlier in the 2020 Karnataka Legislative Assembly election, she contested as an independent candidate, polling over 25,000 votes and finishing third.
