= S. Shivaraj Patil =

Indian politician (born 1970)

Dr. S Shivaraj Patil
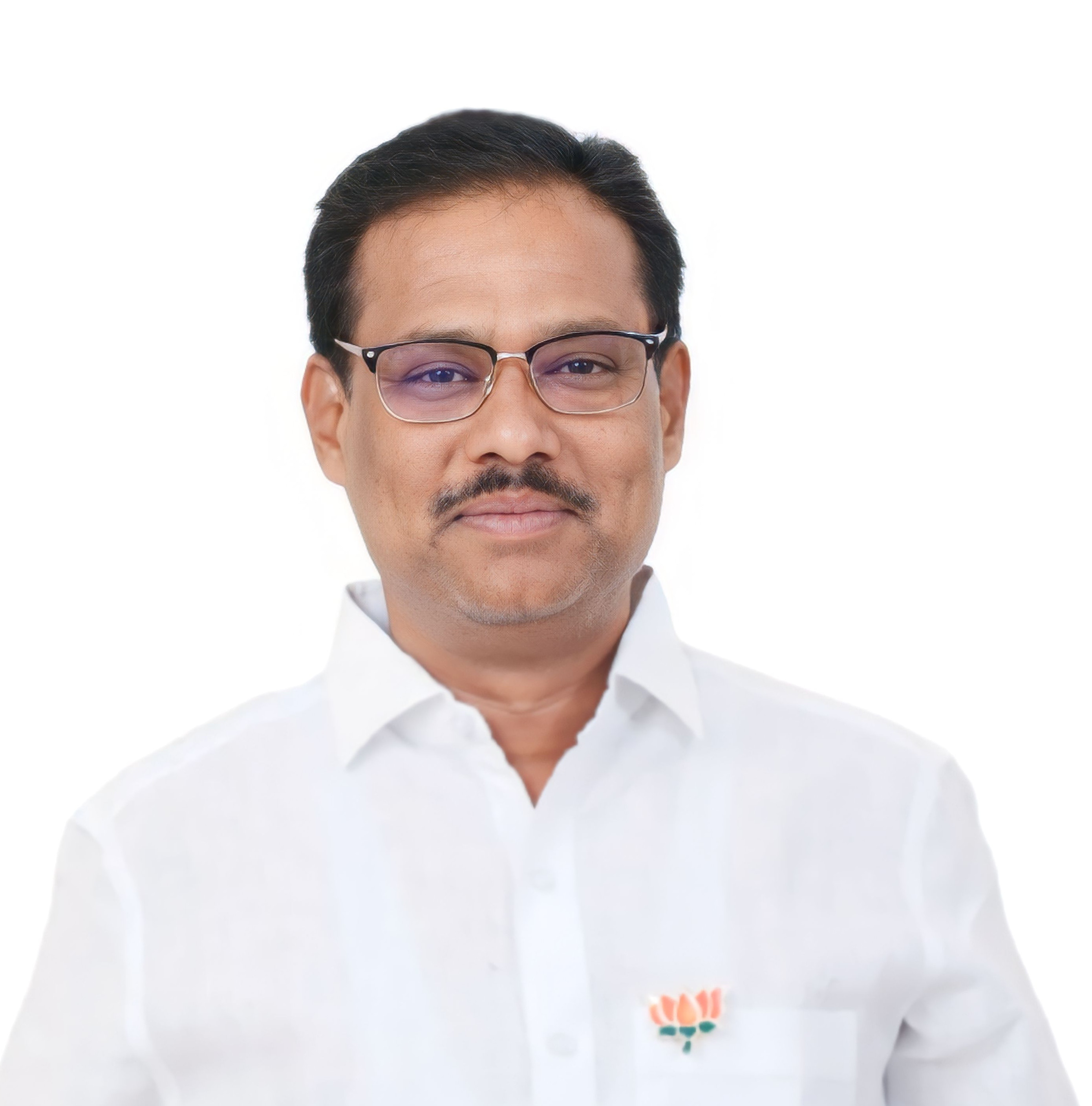

Member of the Karnataka Legislative Assembly
- Incumbent
- Assumed office 2013
- Preceded by: Syed Yasin
- Constituency: Raichur

Personal details
- Born: 8 May 1970 (age 55)
- Party: Bharatiya Janata Party
- Other political affiliations: Janata Dal Secular
- Occupation: Doctor, Politician

Dr. S Shivaraj Patil (born 8 May 1970) is an Indian politician serving as member of Karnataka Legislative Assembly since 2013. He was re elected to Member of Karnataka Legislative Assembly from Raichur City in the 2023 Karnataka Legislative Assembly election to the house as a member of the Bharatiya Janata Party.

== Early life and education ==
Shivaraj Patil was born on 8 May 1970, in Raichur, Karnataka. He studied in Tagore Memorial School. Later on he did his MBBS degree from Mahadevappa Rampure Medical College. Further, completed his MD General Medicine from the same college.

== Political career ==
In 2013 he joined Jantha Dal Secular Party. And in the 2013 Vidhan Sabha elections, he triumphed over Syed Yasin of the Congress party by a margin of 7871 votes. In 2018 he joined Bharatiya Janata Party, and won again against Syed Yasin of the Congress party in the 2018 Vidhan Sabha elections by a margin of 10,991 votes by representing the Bharatiya Janata Party. He won again in 2023 karnataka assembly elections by 3728 votes against Mohammed Shalam of congress and created a record of winning a hattrick in raichur city assembly constituency since the Indian independence, which was never seen before.
