= Priyanka Jarkiholi =

Indian politician

Member of Parliament, Lok Sabha
- Incumbent
- Assumed office 4 June 2024
- Preceded by: Annasaheb Jolle
- Constituency: Chikkodi

Personal details
- Born: 16 April 1997 (age 29) Belagavi, Karnataka
- Party: Indian National Congress
- Parent: Satish Jarkiholi (father)
- Education: MBA

Priyanka Satish Jarkiholi (born 16 April 1997) is an Indian politician from Karnataka. She is a first-time MP from Chikkodi Lok Sabha Constituency of Belagavi District. She represents Indian National Congress. She won the 2024 Indian general election in Karnataka. She is the second youngest woman MP in India in 2024.

== Early life and education ==
Daughter of Congress leader and Member of Legislative Assembly Satish Jarkiholi, Priyanka is from Adivasi Tribal community in Yamakanmardi village of Chikkodi, Karnataka. She runs her own business. She completed her Master of Business Administarion in 2021 from Visvesvaraya Technological University, Belagavi, Karnataka.

== Career ==
Priyanka made her political debut winning the 2024 Indian general election in Karnataka from Chikkodi Lok Sabha Constituency in Belgaum district. She defeated Annasaheb Shankar Jolle of Bharatiya Janata Party by a margin of 90,834 votes. She polled a vote share of 51.21 per cent.

She is the first tribal woman in Karnataka to win an unreserved seat. She is also the second youngest to be elected to the parliament.

== Elections performance ==
General election 2024

2024 Indian general elections: Chikkodi
Party	Candidate	Votes	%	±%
INC	Priyanka Satish Jarkiholi	713,461	51.21	
BJP	Annasaheb Shankar Jolle	6,22,627	44.69	
Independent	Kallolikar Shambhu Krishna	25,466	1.83	
Majority		90,834	6.52	
Turnout		13,95,325	78.81	
