= B. V. Nayak =

Indian politician and member of 16th Lok Sabha

Member of parliament Lok Sabha
- In office 1 September 2014 – 23 May 2019
- Preceded by: Sanna Pakirappa
- Succeeded by: Raja Amareshwara Naik
- Constituency: Raichur

Personal details
- Born: 14 November 1966 (age 59) Arkera, Raichur, Karnataka
- Party: Bharathiya Janata Party
- Other political affiliations: Indian National Congress
- Spouse: Smt.Padmavathi
- Children: 3
- Education: B.Com., LL.B. (Spl.)
- Occupation: Businessperson
- As of 15 December, 2016

B. V. Nayak is an Indian politician and member of Indian Parliament in 16th Lok Sabha. He represented the Raichur in Lok Sabha, the lower house of the Indian Parliament. He belongs to Bharatiya Janata party political party.

== Early life and background ==
Nayak was born to Venkatesh Naik and Savetramma on 14 Nov. 1966 in Arkera village in Raichur District of Karnataka State. Nayak completed B.Com. from B.R.B. College of Commerce, Raichur and LL.B. from K.P.E.S. Law College in Dharwad.

== Personal life ==
Nayak married Padmavathi on 24 Dec. 2010. The couple has three children which includes two sons and one daughter.

== Political career ==
In the 2014 Indian General Election, he narrowly defeated the Bhartiya Janata Party candidate, K. Shivanagouda Naik by 1,499 votes and became a member of the 16th Lok Sabha and represented Raichur (Lok Sabha constituency) in Lok Sabha.

== Positions held ==
Year	Description
May, 2014	Elected to 16th Lok Sabha.
1 Sep. 2014	Member, Standing Committee on Personnel, Public Grievances, Law and Justice.
15 Sep. 2014	Member, Joint Committee on Food Management in Parliament House Complex. Member, Consultative Committee, Ministry of Textiles.
