= Rajshekhar Kolur =

Indian politician

Member of Parliament in 6th Lok Sabha
- In office 23 March 1977 – 22 August 1979
- Constituency: Raichur Lok Sabha constituency

Personal details
- Born: 31 December 1936 (age 89) Rampur Village, Raichur district.
- Party: Indian National Congress
- Spouse: Smt. Shardamma Kolur (21 April 1969)
- Children: 2 sons and 2 daughters
- Parent: Mallappa Kolur
- Education: Nizam College, Hyderabad, Osmania University, Hyderabad and Bangalore University
- Profession: Advocate and Agriculturist

Rajshekhar Kolur (born 31 December 1936) is an Indian politician who served as a Member of Parliament in 6th Lok Sabha from Raichur Lok Sabha constituency.

== Early life and background ==
Rajshekhar was born on 31 December 1936 in Rampur Village of Raichur district. Mallappa Kolur was his father. He completed schooling from Nrupathunga High School, Hyderabad, before going on to do his graduation in B.Com. and B.L. from Nizam College, Hyderabad, Osmania University, Hyderabad, and Bangalore University.

== Personal life ==
Rajshekhar Kolur married Smt. Shardamma Kolur on 21 April 1969. The couple has two sons and two daughters.

== Position held ==
#	From	To	Position
1.	1964	1969	President of District Youth Congress.
2.	1969	1972	Councillor of Town Municipal Council, Yadgir (Gulbarga Dist. Mysore).
3.	1969	1973	Convener of District Youth Congress Committee - Gulbarga.
4.	1970	1972	President of Block Congress Committee - Yadgir.
5.	1970	1973	General Secretary of District Congress Committee - Gulbarga.
6.	1977	1979	Member of parliament in 6th Lok Sabha from Raichur.: Member of Committee on Private Members' Bills and Resolutions (During 1977)
