= Venkatesh Nayak =

Indian politician (1936–2015)

A. Venkatesh Naik

Member of Legislative Assembly of Karnataka
- In office 13 May 2013 – 24 August 2015
- Preceded by: K. Shivana Gouda Naik
- Constituency: Devadurga

Member of the Indian Parliament for Raichur
- In office 1991–1996
- Preceded by: R. Ambanna Naik Dore
- Succeeded by: Raja Rangappa Naik
- In office 1998–2009
- Preceded by: Raja Rangappa Naik
- Succeeded by: Sanna Pakirappa

Personal details
- Born: 6 June 1936 Raichur, Kingdom of Mysore, British India
- Died: 24 August 2015 (aged 79) Anantapur, Andhra Pradesh, India
- Party: Indian National Congress (1968–2015)
- Spouse: Savitri (1964–2015)
- Children: 5

A. Venkatesh Naik (6 June 1936 – 24 August 2015) was an Indian politician and a member of the Indian National Congress (INC) political party, with whom he had been a member for nearly 50 years. He was elected to the 10th Lok Sabha in 1991 from Raichur constituency in Karnataka. He was re-elected to the Lok Sabha in 1998, 1999 and 2004 from the same constituency. He secured a seat in the Karnataka legislative assembly elections of 2013 from Devdurga constituency. On 24 August 2015, Nayak was among 5 killed in a train accident in Andhra Pradesh.
