= Examba =

Examba Yaksamba
- City
- Yakshamba
- Location in Karnataka, India Examba (India)
- Coordinates: 16°31′56.265″N 74°36′11.752″E
- State: Karnataka
- District: Belgaum
- Formation of Municipal Council: 30 April 2015
- Founder: Government of Karnataka
- Talukas: Chikodi

Area
  - Total: 38.76 km^{2} (14.97 sq mi)

Population (2011)
  - Total: 17,500
  - Density: 451/km^{2} (1,170/sq mi)

Kannada
  - Official: Kannada
- Time zone: UTC+5:30 (IST)
- PIN: 591244

Examba is a village located in the Belagavi district of the Indian state of Karnataka.

== History ==
Historically, it was an important center during the rule of the Ratta dynasty in the 11th century, who made it a hub of political and cultural activities.

Inscriptions mention that the Ratta kings visited Examba and performed ritual abhisheka (anointing rituals) at local Jain Basadi, indicating the village's significance as a Jain religious site in medieval Karnataka. Historical records say that many Jain Basadis were present during the rule of Rattas.

The historical name was Ekkasambige, recorded during the rule of the Jain kingdoms.

It became a Gram Panchayath since from 1956. It became the Town Panchayath Council (TPC) in 2015.

== Summary ==
- Properties – 3900
- Wards – 17
- Roads – 113.23 km
- Water supply – 5 lakhs liters
- Per capita water supply – 95 L.P.C.D.
- Summer temperature – 35–40 *C
- Winter temperature – 20–25 *C

== Demographics ==
Examba village has a population of 15,224 of which 7,810 are males while 7,414 are females as per 2011 census. 3,253 families reside there.

Children age 0–6 number 1,654, 10.86% of the total. Average sex ratio village is 949 which is lower than Karnataka state average of 973. Child Sex Ratio for the Examba as per census is 854, lower than Karnataka average of 948.

The village has higher literacy rate than Karnataka. In 2011, literacy rate village was 80.40% compared with 75.36% of Karnataka. Male literacy stands at 89.39% while female literacy rate was 71.05%.

Examba village is administrated by an elected Sarpanch (Head of Village).

The people speak both Kannada and Marathi.

== Economy ==
Beereshwar Society, a multi state co-operative bank, is headquartered there.

Agriculture is the main source of income. Sugar cane is the major crop, although farmers have begun cultivating vegetables viz, tomatoes, brinjal, cabbage, cauliflower, chillies, capsicum, leafy vegetables, coriander.

== Temples ==
The village has several temples:

- Neminath Tirthankar Jain Basadi (11th century)
- Village God Shree Beereshwar Temple
- Shree Karlhondibeereshwar Temple
- Shree Mahadev Temple
- Shree Santubai Temple
- Shree Ykanathi Temple
- Shree Hanuman Temple
- Shree Mahalaxshmi Temple
- Shree Pandurang Temple
- Shree Renuka Yellamma Temple
- Hazarat Shahnandwali Dargah
- Hazarat Mansurwali Dargah
- Hazarat Davalshawali (Malangbaba) Dargah
- Sitaram Temple
- Maragubayi temple
- kumbhar lagamavva
- ganesh mandir
- Thaloba Temple
- Karevva Temple
- Datta Temple

== See also ==
- Belagavi
- Districts of Karnataka
