= G Kumar Naik =

Indian politician

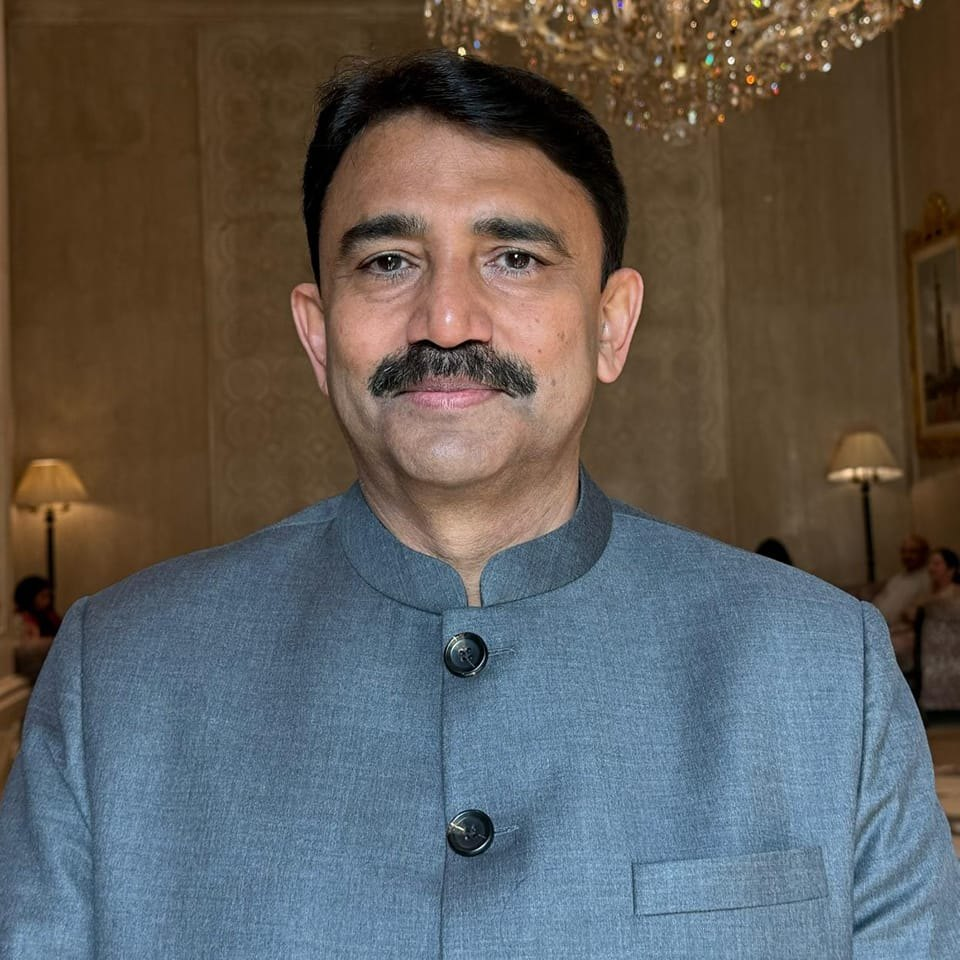

Member Of Parliament, Raichur Lok Sabha Constituency
- Incumbent
- Assumed office 4 June 2024
- Preceded by: Raja Amareshwara Naik
- Constituency: Raichur

Personal details
- Born: 12 September 1963 (age 63) Bengaluru, Karnataka
- Party: Indian National Congress
- Spouse: Sheela Kulkarni (m. 11 November 1993)
- Children: 2
- Parent(s): Govindaswamy Naik T N, S R Sharadamma

G. Kumar Naik is an Indian politician and former Indian Administrative Service (IAS) officer who currently serves as a Member of Parliament in the 18th Lok Sabha from the Raichur constituency in Karnataka. He is a member of the Indian National Congress.

== Political career ==
After a career in the Indian Administrative Service (IAS), G. Kumar Naik entered electoral politics by joining the Indian National Congress.

In the 2024 Indian general election, Naik contested the Raichur (ST) Lok Sabha constituency in Karnataka as the candidate of the Indian National Congress. He was elected to the 18th Lok Sabha, defeating the incumbent Bharatiya Janata Party (BJP) candidate Raja Amareshwara Naik Raja Amareshwara Naik.

In Parliament, Naik serves as a member of the Parliamentary Standing Committee on Communications and Information Technology. He has regularly attended the meetings of the committee and maintains a high attendance record in the Lok Sabha.

Naik also engages actively with the Union Government, meeting, consulting, and corresponding with various Union Ministers to advocate for projects, infrastructure, and financial support for the state. His parliamentary work focuses on securing greater investment, development projects, and policy attention

As a Member of Parliament from the Indian National Congress, Naik has also participated in several panel discussions on national news television channels, where he articulates and defends his party's position on public issues. He has also been a panelist at BBC’s World Questions.
