= K. Shivanagouda Naik =

Indian politician

Shivanagouda Naik

Chairman of Karnataka Road Development Corporation
- Incumbent
- Assumed office 28 July 2020
- Chief Minister: B. S. Yediyurappa; Basavaraj Bommai

Political Secretary to the Chief Minister of Karnataka
- In office 18 August 2012 – 8 May 2013 Serving with Shankar Patil Munenakoppa
- Chief Minister: Jagadish Shettar

Cabinet Minister Government of Karnataka
- In office 10 July 2008 – 22 September 2010
- Ministry: Term
- Minister of Mass Education & Public Library Minister of Small Savings & Lottery: 10 July 2008 - 22 September 2010

Member of Karnataka Legislative Assembly
- Incumbent
- Assumed office 2018
- Preceded by: A. Venkatesh Naik
- Constituency: Devadurga
- In office 2008–2013
- Preceded by: Alkod Hanumathappa
- Succeeded by: A. Venkatesh Naik
- Constituency: Devadurga

Personal details
- Born: Shivanagouda Naik Arkera, Raichur district, Karnataka
- Party: Bharatiya Janata Party
- Occupation: Politician

K. Shivanagouda Nayaka is an Indian politician belonging to the Bharatiya Janata Party. He is a former minister of Karnataka. He was elected to the Karnataka Legislative Assembly from Raichur district. He unsuccessfully contested the 2014 Lok Sabha election from Raichur against B V Nayak.
