= Devadurga Assembly constituency =

Legislative Assembly constituency in Karnataka State, India

Coordinates: 16.42°N 76.93°E

Devadurga
- Constituency No. 56 for the Karnataka Legislative Assembly

Constituency details
- Country: India
- Region: South India
- State: Karnataka
- District: Raichur
- Lok Sabha constituency: Raichur
- Established: 1951
- Total electors: 233,492
- Reservation: ST

Member of Legislative Assembly
- 16th Karnataka Legislative Assembly
- Incumbent Karemma Nayak
- Party: JD(S)
- Alliance: NDA
- Elected year: 2023
- Preceded by: K. Shivanagouda Nayak

Devadurga Assembly constituency is one of the 224 Legislative Assembly constituencies of Karnataka in India. It is part of Raichur district and is reserved for candidates belonging to the Scheduled Tribes. As of 2023, it is represented by Karemma Nayak of the Janata Dal (Secular).

== Members of the Legislative Assembly ==
Election	Member	Party
1952	Karibasappa Guru Basappa	Independent politician
1957	B. Shivanna	Indian National Congress
1962	Sharanappa	Indian National Congress
1967	S. P. B. Patil	Swatantra Party
1972	Sharanappa	Indian National Congress
1978	B. Shivanna	Indian National Congress
1983	B. Shivanna	Indian National Congress
1985	A. Purshpavathi	Janata Party
1989	B. Shivanna	Indian National Congress
1994	B. T. Lalitha Naik	Janata Dal
1999	Akkaraki Yallappa	Indian National Congress
2004	Alkod Hanumanthappa	Janata Dal
2008	K. Shivanagouda Naik	Janata Dal
2008 By-election	K. Shivanagouda Naik	Janata Dal
2013	Venkatesh Nayak	Indian National Congress
2016 By-election (Note: Died on 24/08/2015)	K. Shivanagouda Naik	Bharatiya Janata Party
2018	K. Shivanagouda Naik	Bharatiya Janata Party
2023	Karemma Nayak	Janata Dal

== Election results ==
=== Assembly Election 2023 ===
2023 Karnataka Legislative Assembly election : Devadurga
Party	Candidate	Votes	%	±%
JD(S)	Karemma Nayak	99,544	56.75	▲52.21
BJP	K. Shivanagouda Naik	65,288	37.22	▼5.36
INC	A. Shridevi	3,909	2.23	▼26.97
Independent	Roopa	2,784	1.59	New
NOTA	None of the above	2,751	1.57	▲0.34
BSP	Narasannagouda Hosamani	1,130	0.64	New
Margin of victory		34,256	19.53	▲6.16
Turnout		175,560	75.19	▲6.01
Total valid votes		175,406		
Registered electors		233,492		▲2.48
JD(S) gain from BJP		Swing	▲14.17	

=== Assembly Election 2018 ===
2018 Karnataka Legislative Assembly election : Devadurga
Party	Candidate	Votes	%	±%
BJP	K. Shivanagouda Naik	67,003	42.58	▼9.53
INC	A. Rajashekar Nayak	45,958	29.20	▼10.81
Independent	Karemma	25,226	16.03	New
JD(S)	Arkera Venkatesh Pujari	7,137	4.54	▼2.03
Independent	Mamitha Siddayyatata Guruvina	6,391	4.06	New
AIMEP	Shivaraj Dore	2,179	1.38	New
NOTA	None of the above	1,932	1.23	
Independent	Narasannagouda Hosamani	1,543	0.98	New
Margin of victory		21,045	13.37	▲1.27
Turnout		157,617	69.18	▲2.10
Total valid votes		157,369		
Registered electors		227,846		▲8.30
BJP hold		Swing	▼9.53	

=== Assembly By-election 2016 ===
2016 Karnataka Legislative Assembly by-election : Devadurga
Party	Candidate	Votes	%	±%
BJP	K. Shivanagouda Naik	72,647	52.11	▲7.06
INC	A. Rajashekar Nayak	55,776	40.01	▼7.89
JD(S)	Karemma G. Nayaka	9,156	6.57	New
Independent	Shivaraj Dore	1,837	1.32	New
NOTA	None of the above	1,708	1.23	New
Margin of victory		16,871	12.10	▲9.24
Turnout		141,126	67.08	▼2.62
Total valid votes		139,406		
Registered electors		210,383		▲15.05
BJP gain from INC		Swing	▲4.21	

=== Assembly Election 2013 ===
2013 Karnataka Legislative Assembly election : Devadurga
Party	Candidate	Votes	%	±%
INC	Venkatesh Nayak	62,070	47.90	▲11.23
BJP	Arakera K. Shivanagouda Nayak	58,370	45.05	▲32.27
KJP	Shanth Gowda	2,747	2.12	New
BSRCP	Anjala Channanagouda	2,158	1.67	New
CPI(ML) Red Star	Basavaraj Nayak Gugeradody	1,217	0.94	New
JD(U)	Channabasava	860	0.66	New
Margin of victory		3,700	2.86	▼2.29
Turnout		127,443	69.70	▲13.91
Total valid votes		129,580		
Registered electors		182,856		▲14.53
INC gain from JD(S)		Swing	▲6.08	

=== Assembly Election 2008 ===
2008 Karnataka Legislative Assembly election : Devadurga
Party	Candidate	Votes	%	±%
JD(S)	K. Shivanagouda Naik	37,226	41.82	▲3.35
INC	Venkatesh Nayak	32,639	36.67	▲17.53
BJP	Sujatha Patil	11,374	12.78	▲6.72
Independent	Hanumesh Shivanna	2,564	2.88	New
BSP	Venkanna Dore	2,133	2.40	New
SP	Sanjeevappa Naik	1,123	1.26	New
Independent	Manashayya Naik	1,007	1.13	New
Independent	Adeppa	949	1.07	New
Margin of victory		4,587	5.15	▼10.18
Turnout		89,064	55.79	▲0.48
Total valid votes		89,015		
Registered electors		159,653		▲1.44
JD(S) hold		Swing	▲3.35	

=== Assembly Election 2004 ===
2004 Karnataka Legislative Assembly election : Devadurga
Party	Candidate	Votes	%	±%
JD(S)	Alkod Hanumanthappa	33,460	38.47	New
Independent	Manappa	20,125	23.14	New
INC	Akkaraki Yallappa	16,648	19.14	▼38.62
BJP	Thimmayya. R	5,271	6.06	▼7.11
JP	Lalitha Nayak. B. T	3,947	4.54	New
Independent	Rangappa	2,879	3.31	New
Independent	Soma Sekher Ramdurga	1,964	2.26	New
Independent	Shivappa	1,426	1.64	New
Kannada Nadu Party	Hanmanthappa	1,262	1.45	New
Margin of victory		13,335	15.33	▼21.33
Turnout		87,051	55.31	▼0.84
Total valid votes		86,982		
Registered electors		157,394		▲19.91
JD(S) gain from INC		Swing	▼19.29	

=== Assembly Election 1999 ===
1999 Karnataka Legislative Assembly election : Devadurga
Party	Candidate	Votes	%	±%
INC	Akkaraki Yallappa	39,973	57.76	▲34.40
JD(U)	Shivalingaswami	14,602	21.10	New
BJP	Thimmayya. R	9,112	13.17	▲8.69
CPI(M)	Chandrappa	5,519	7.97	New
Margin of victory		25,371	36.66	▲25.85
Turnout		73,706	56.15	▲7.51
Total valid votes		69,206		
Rejected ballots		4,469	6.06	▲1.83
Registered electors		131,260		▲10.12
INC gain from JD		Swing	▲20.04	

=== Assembly Election 1994 ===
1994 Karnataka Legislative Assembly election : Devadurga
Party	Candidate	Votes	%	±%
JD	B. T. Lalitha Naik	20,946	37.72	▲16.62
INC	Yellappa	14,943	26.91	New
INC	B. Shivanna	12,973	23.36	▼24.62
BJP	Bassanna Kote	2,486	4.48	New
KRRS	Kemanna	2,109	3.80	New
BSP	Tippanna	841	1.51	New
Independent	Muthuswamy Sethu	600	1.08	New
Independent	Laxmi Devivh Master	437	0.79	New
Margin of victory		6,003	10.81	▼15.85
Turnout		57,983	48.64	▲4.20
Total valid votes		55,529		
Rejected ballots		2,454	4.23	▼4.56
Registered electors		119,197		▲6.80
JD gain from INC		Swing	▼10.26	

=== Assembly Election 1989 ===
1989 Karnataka Legislative Assembly election : Devadurga
Party	Candidate	Votes	%	±%
INC	B. Shivanna	21,705	47.98	▲4.49
JP	Chandrakanth	9,644	21.32	New
JD	A. Pushpavati	9,546	21.10	New
Independent	Muthuswamy Sethu	1,057	2.34	New
Independent	N. Chandrasekharayya	995	2.20	New
Independent	Tippanna	824	1.82	New
Kranti Sabha	Earanna Naik	788	1.74	New
Independent	Laxmi Devi	402	0.89	New
Independent	Urukundappa	276	0.61	New
Margin of victory		12,061	26.66	▲22.98
Turnout		49,599	44.44	▲1.23
Total valid votes		45,237		
Rejected ballots		4,362	8.79	▲5.55
Registered electors		111,605		▲28.52
INC gain from JP		Swing	▲0.81	

=== Assembly Election 1985 ===
1985 Karnataka Legislative Assembly election : Devadurga
Party	Candidate	Votes	%	±%
JP	A. Purshpavathi	17,127	47.17	▲5.31
INC	B. Shivanna	15,790	43.49	▼9.18
Independent	Yelakappa	2,134	5.88	New
Independent	D. Yenkappa	1,130	3.11	New
Margin of victory		1,337	3.68	▼7.14
Turnout		37,525	43.21	▼0.03
Total valid votes		36,309		
Rejected ballots		1,216	3.24	▼2.19
Registered electors		86,842		▲8.44
JP gain from INC		Swing	▼5.50	

=== Assembly Election 1983 ===
1983 Karnataka Legislative Assembly election : Devadurga
Party	Candidate	Votes	%	±%
INC	B. Shivanna	17,251	52.67	▲43.81
JP	Yellappa Rangappa	13,708	41.86	▲13.31
BJP	Adeppa	1,792	5.47	New
Margin of victory		3,543	10.82	▼23.23
Turnout		34,631	43.24	▼4.80
Total valid votes		32,751		
Rejected ballots		1,880	5.43	▲0.12
Registered electors		80,082		▲4.83
INC gain from INC(I)		Swing	▼9.92	

=== Assembly Election 1978 ===
1978 Karnataka Legislative Assembly election : Devadurga
Party	Candidate	Votes	%	±%
INC(I)	B. Shivanna	21,752	62.59	New
JP	Noorya Naik Hemlya Naik	9,921	28.55	New
INC	Ramji Naik Ganka Naik	3,078	8.86	▼25.87
Margin of victory		11,831	34.05	▲26.77
Turnout		36,700	48.04	▲1.26
Total valid votes		34,751		
Rejected ballots		1,949	5.31	▲5.31
Registered electors		76,391		▲11.58
INC(I) gain from INC(O)		Swing	▲20.58	

=== Assembly Election 1972 ===
1972 Mysore State Legislative Assembly election : Devadurga
Party	Candidate	Votes	%	±%
INC(O)	Sharanappa	12,795	42.01	New
INC	Ambanna	10,579	34.73	▼1.54
Independent	Sadashivappa Patil	6,838	22.45	New
ABJS	Siddappa Bijapur	245	0.80	New
Margin of victory		2,216	7.28	▼20.17
Turnout		32,028	46.78	▼5.90
Total valid votes		30,457		
Registered electors		68,465		▲11.00
INC(O) gain from SWA		Swing	▼21.72	

=== Assembly Election 1967 ===
1967 Mysore State Legislative Assembly election : Devadurga
Party	Candidate	Votes	%	±%
SWA	S. P. B. Patil	19,074	63.73	New
INC	Sharanappa	10,857	36.27	▼34.76
Margin of victory		8,217	27.45	▼14.62
Turnout		32,492	52.68	▲9.19
Total valid votes		29,931		
Registered electors		61,678		▲9.53
SWA gain from INC		Swing	▼7.30	

=== Assembly Election 1962 ===
1962 Mysore State Legislative Assembly election : Devadurga
Party	Candidate	Votes	%	±%
INC	Sharanappa	16,143	71.03	▲13.00
Lok Sewak Sangh	C. M. Devindra Naik	6,583	28.97	New
Margin of victory		9,560	42.07	▲26.01
Turnout		24,488	43.49	▲12.20
Total valid votes		22,726		
Registered electors		56,309		▲6.57
INC hold		Swing	▲13.00	

=== Assembly Election 1957 ===
1957 Mysore State Legislative Assembly election : Devadurga
Party	Candidate	Votes	%	±%
INC	B. Shivanna	9,595	58.03	▲33.79
Independent	Sidramappa	6,940	41.97	New
Margin of victory		2,655	16.06	▼35.47
Turnout		16,535	31.29	▼3.66
Total valid votes		16,535		
Registered electors		52,836		▼1.99
INC gain from Independent		Swing	▼17.73	

=== Assembly Election 1952 ===
1952 Hyderabad State Legislative Assembly election : Deodurg
Party	Candidate	Votes	%	±%
Independent	Karibasappa Guru Basappa	14,274	75.76	New
INC	Gudihal Hanumanth Rao	4,566	24.24	New
Margin of victory		9,708	51.53	
Turnout		18,840	34.95	
Total valid votes		18,840		
Registered electors		53,909		
Independent win (new seat)				

== See also ==
- List of constituencies of the Karnataka Legislative Assembly
- Raichur district
