= Raichur Assembly constituency =

Legislative Assembly constituency in Karnataka State, India

Coordinates: 16.21°N 77.36°E

Raichur
- Constituency No. 54 for the Karnataka Legislative Assembly

Constituency details
- Country: India
- Region: South India
- State: Karnataka
- District: Raichur
- Lok Sabha constituency: Raichur
- Established: 1951
- Total electors: 232,744
- Reservation: None

Member of Legislative Assembly
- 16th Karnataka Legislative Assembly
- Incumbent S. Shivaraj Patil
- Party: Bharatiya Janata Party
- Elected year: 2018
- Preceded by: Syed Yasin

Raichur Legislative Assembly constituency is one of the 224 Legislative Assembly constituencies of Karnataka in India. It is a part of Raichur district.

== Members of the Legislative Assembly ==
Election	Member	Party
1952	L. K. Shroff	Indian National Congress
1957	Bhimanna; Syed Easa	Indian National Congress
1962	M. Mohiuddin Ghouse	Indian National Congress
1967	M. N. Basappa	Sanghata Socialist Party
1972	Nazeer Ahmad Siddiqui	Indian National Congress
1978	Nazeer Ahmad Siddiqui	Indian National Congress
1983	Sangameshwar Sardar	Janata Party
1985	Mohamed Oner Abdul Rahman	Indian National Congress
1989	M. S. Patil	Janata Dal
1994	M. S. Patil	Janata Dal
1999	Syed Yasin	Indian National Congress
2004	Ahuja Papareddy	Bharatiya Janata Party
2008	Syed Yasin	Indian National Congress
2013	Dr. S. Shivaraj Patil	Janata Dal
2018	Dr. S. Shivaraj Patil	Bharatiya Janata Party
2023	Dr. S. Shivaraj Patil	Bharatiya Janata Party

== Election results ==
=== Assembly Election 2023 ===
2023 Karnataka Legislative Assembly election : Raichur
Party	Candidate	Votes	%	±%
BJP	Dr. S. Shivaraj Patil	69,755	47.99%	▲2.38
INC	Mohammed Shalam	65,923	45.36%	▲8.62
JD(S)	E. Vinay Kumar	2,780	1.91%	▼4.38
Independent	Mujeebuddin	1,327	0.91%	New
NOTA	None of the above	588	0.40%	▼0.07
Margin of victory		3,832	2.64%	▼6.23
Turnout		145,648	62.58%	▲8.17
Total valid votes		145,343		
Registered electors		232,744		▲1.95
BJP hold		Swing	▲2.38	

=== Assembly Election 2018 ===
2018 Karnataka Legislative Assembly election : Raichur
Party	Candidate	Votes	%	±%
BJP	Dr. S. Shivaraj Patil	56,511	45.61%	▲40.54
INC	Syed Yaseen	45,520	36.74%	▲6.08
JD(S)	Mahantesh Patil	7,796	6.29%	▼30.82
Independent	E. Anjaneya	5,701	4.60%	New
Independent	Syed Masoom	1,290	1.04%	New
Independent	Kavitha. G. H	778	0.63%	New
NOTA	None of the above	587	0.47%	New
Margin of victory		10,991	8.87%	▲2.42
Turnout		124,203	54.41%	▲0.73
Total valid votes		123,892		
Registered electors		228,286		▲23.36
BJP gain from JD(S)		Swing	▲8.50	

=== Assembly Election 2013 ===
2013 Karnataka Legislative Assembly election : Raichur
Party	Candidate	Votes	%	±%
JD(S)	Dr. S. Shivaraj Patil	45,263	37.11%	▲11.78
INC	Syed Yasin	37,392	30.66%	▼5.03
BJP	Trivikram Joshi	6,186	5.07%	▼19.70
BSRCP	Pooja Gandhi	1,815	1.49%	New
KJP	Basavaraj Kalasa	1,365	1.12%	New
BSP	Hares Siddiq	1,274	1.04%	▼6.10
Margin of victory		7,871	6.45%	▼3.91
Turnout		99,341	53.68%	▲8.34
Total valid votes		121,974		
Registered electors		185,053		▲3.91
JD(S) gain from INC		Swing	▲1.42	

=== Assembly Election 2008 ===
2008 Karnataka Legislative Assembly election : Raichur
Party	Candidate	Votes	%	±%
INC	Syed Yasin	28,801	35.69%	▲8.21
JD(S)	M. Earanna	20,440	25.33%	▲16.25
BJP	Ahuja Papareddy	19,987	24.77%	▼11.74
BSP	E. Anjaneya	5,765	7.14%	▲6.01
Independent	Shaik Hussain Basha	1,131	1.40%	New
SP	Muniyappa Mudappa	947	1.17%	New
Independent	V. H. Master	782	0.97%	New
Independent	Ramanna Neermanvi	689	0.85%	New
LJP	Noor Mohammed	542	0.67%	New
Margin of victory		8,361	10.36%	▲1.33
Turnout		80,743	45.34%	▼9.72
Total valid votes		80,698		
Registered electors		178,095		▼7.71
INC gain from BJP		Swing	▼0.82	

=== Assembly Election 2004 ===
2004 Karnataka Legislative Assembly election : Raichur
Party	Candidate	Votes	%	±%
BJP	Ahuja Papareddy	38,784	36.51%	▲4.23
INC	Syed Yasin	29,188	27.48%	▼10.79
Independent	M. Earanna	20,950	19.72%	New
JD(S)	Patil Ms	9,641	9.08%	▲7.26
Independent	Hussainpeer. G. H	1,747	1.64%	New
LJP	Noor Mohammed	1,376	1.30%	New
BSP	Maraja Basha Ssk	1,205	1.13%	▼0.48
JP	Laxmikantamma Dr. Ramakrishna Shetty	937	0.88%	New
Kannada Nadu Party	Javed Ms	915	0.86%	New
Margin of victory		9,596	9.03%	▲3.04
Turnout		106,244	55.06%	▲0.37
Total valid votes		106,218		
Registered electors		192,970		▲7.00
BJP gain from INC		Swing	▼1.76	

=== Assembly Election 1999 ===
1999 Karnataka Legislative Assembly election : Raichur
Party	Candidate	Votes	%	±%
INC	Syed Yasin	35,484	38.27%	▲7.50
BJP	Ahuja Papareddy	29,928	32.28%	▲8.64
JD(U)	M. S. Patil	21,175	22.84%	New
JD(S)	G. Ramachandra Reddy	1,686	1.82%	New
BSP	M. Virupakashi	1,496	1.61%	▼0.47
Independent	U. Bheemareddy	942	1.02%	New
Independent	Khaleel Khan	718	0.77%	New
Margin of victory		5,556	5.99%	▼0.58
Turnout		98,628	54.69%	▼1.70
Total valid votes		92,711		
Rejected ballots		5,773	5.85%	▲2.48
Registered electors		180,347		▲27.44
INC gain from JD		Swing	▲0.93	

=== Assembly Election 1994 ===
1994 Karnataka Legislative Assembly election : Raichur
Party	Candidate	Votes	%	±%
JD	M. S. Patil	28,776	37.34%	▼4.78
INC	Syed Yasin	23,715	30.77%	▼5.58
BJP	Ahuja Papareddy	18,221	23.64%	▲18.56
INL	Mohd. Fazalullah	2,083	2.70%	New
BSP	Urvekvndappa	1,600	2.08%	New
Independent	Khaleel Khan	584	0.76%	New
Margin of victory		5,061	6.57%	▲0.80
Turnout		79,794	56.39%	▲11.00
Total valid votes		77,075		
Rejected ballots		2,686	3.37%	▼5.40
Registered electors		141,515		▲8.17
JD hold		Swing	▼4.78	

=== Assembly Election 1989 ===
1989 Karnataka Legislative Assembly election : Raichur
Party	Candidate	Votes	%	±%
JD	M. S. Patil	22,818	42.12%	New
INC	Mohammed Omer	19,692	36.35%	▼16.51
JP	Mohammed Osman Ali	4,575	8.45%	New
BJP	N. Shankarappa	2,752	5.08%	▲1.88
Independent	Narasappa	1,905	3.52%	New
Independent	Ahmed Hussain	492	0.91%	New
RPI	Omdas	431	0.80%	New
Independent	Muttusami Setu	336	0.62%	New
Margin of victory		3,126	5.77%	▼26.83
Turnout		59,385	45.39%	▲4.23
Total valid votes		54,174		
Rejected ballots		5,211	8.77%	▲5.70
Registered electors		130,824		▲26.01
JD gain from INC		Swing	▼10.74	

=== Assembly Election 1985 ===
1985 Karnataka Legislative Assembly election : Raichur
Party	Candidate	Votes	%	±%
INC	Mohamed Oner Abdul Rahman	21,896	52.86%	▲9.48
JP	Abdul Sanad Siddiqui	8,392	20.26%	▼33.23
Independent	M. Nagappa	7,394	17.85%	New
Independent	Narasingrao Kulkarni	1,589	3.84%	New
BJP	Nidugurthy Shankarappa	1,324	3.20%	New
Independent	Mustipally Krishayya	427	1.03%	New
Margin of victory		13,504	32.60%	▲22.49
Turnout		42,736	41.16%	▼11.94
Total valid votes		41,425		
Rejected ballots		1,311	3.07%	▼0.30
Registered electors		103,823		▲15.01
INC gain from JP		Swing	▼0.63	

=== Assembly Election 1983 ===
1983 Karnataka Legislative Assembly election : Raichur
Party	Candidate	Votes	%	±%
JP	Sangameshwar Sardar	24,777	53.49%	▲35.33
INC	M. Omer	20,094	43.38%	▲42.12
Independent	Verappa. H. Master	1,448	3.13%	New
Margin of victory		4,683	10.11%	▼20.59
Turnout		47,934	53.10%	▲1.63
Total valid votes		46,319		
Rejected ballots		1,615	3.37%	▼0.64
Registered electors		90,274		▲17.99
JP gain from INC(I)		Swing	▼1.06	

=== Assembly Election 1978 ===
1978 Karnataka Legislative Assembly election : Raichur
Party	Candidate	Votes	%	±%
INC(I)	Nazeer Ahmad Siddiqui	20,619	54.55%	New
Independent	V. Rajanna Laxayya	9,013	23.84%	New
JP	M. Basheeruddin	6,866	18.16%	New
INC	Kazi Abdul Rauf Abdul Gaffar	478	1.26%	▼44.24
Independent	Parikhitraj Gururao	438	1.16%	New
Independent	Dony. M. Lobo	387	1.02%	New
Margin of victory		11,606	30.70%	▲19.68
Turnout		39,381	51.47%	▲7.35
Total valid votes		37,801		
Rejected ballots		1,580	4.01%	▲4.01
Registered electors		76,509		▲6.14
INC(I) gain from INC		Swing	▲9.05	

=== Assembly Election 1972 ===
1972 Mysore State Legislative Assembly election : Raichur
Party	Candidate	Votes	%	±%
INC	Nazeer Ahmad Siddiqui	13,953	45.50%	▲21.90
INC(O)	Sangameshwar Sardar	10,575	34.48%	New
SSP	M. Nagappa	5,044	16.45%	New
ABJS	M. Bhima Reddy	1,094	3.57%	▼5.22
Margin of victory		3,378	11.02%	▼28.62
Turnout		31,805	44.12%	▲6.28
Total valid votes		30,666		
Registered electors		72,080		▲10.37
INC gain from SSP		Swing	▼17.74	

=== Assembly Election 1967 ===
1967 Mysore State Legislative Assembly election : Raichur
Party	Candidate	Votes	%	±%
SSP	M. N. Basappa	14,637	63.24%	New
INC	M. G. Mohiuddin	5,463	23.60%	▼30.24
ABJS	R. Rao	2,034	8.79%	New
Independent	Raguvendrachari	736	3.18%	New
Independent	M. H. S. Khan	275	1.19%	New
Margin of victory		9,174	39.64%	▲31.97
Turnout		24,710	37.84%	▲3.39
Total valid votes		23,145		
Registered electors		65,308		▲16.71
SSP gain from INC		Swing	▲9.40	

=== Assembly Election 1962 ===
1962 Mysore State Legislative Assembly election : Raichur
Party	Candidate	Votes	%	±%
INC	M. Mohiuddin Ghouse	9,699	53.84%	▼2.14
Lok Sewak Sangh	Narayanappa Gandhal	8,317	46.16%	New
Margin of victory		1,382	7.67%	▲5.14
Turnout		19,279	34.45%	▼18.42
Total valid votes		18,016		
Registered electors		55,958		▼42.46
INC hold		Swing	▲24.58	

=== Assembly Election 1957 ===
1957 Mysore State Legislative Assembly election : Raichur
Party	Candidate	Votes	%	±%
INC	Bhimanna	15,044	29.26%	▼23.83
INC	Syed Easa	13,744	26.73%	▼26.36
Independent	M. Nagappa	8,254	16.05%	New
Independent	Narsapur Ananth Rao	7,583	14.75%	New
Independent	Basappa	6,797	13.22%	New
Margin of victory		1,300	2.53%	▼12.51
Turnout		51,422	52.87%	▲19.31
Total valid votes		51,422		
Registered electors		97,258		▲72.37
INC hold		Swing	▼23.83	

=== Assembly Election 1952 ===
1952 Hyderabad State Legislative Assembly election : Raichur
Party	Candidate	Votes	%	±%
INC	L. K. Shroff	10,053	53.09%	New
Independent	Kallur Siddanna	7,205	38.05%	New
Independent	B. A. Patel	1,677	8.86%	New
Margin of victory		2,848	15.04%	
Turnout		18,935	33.56%	
Total valid votes		18,935		
Registered electors		56,423		
INC win (new seat)				

== See also ==
- List of constituencies of the Karnataka Legislative Assembly
- Raichur district
