= Raichur Lok Sabha constituency =

Lok Sabha constituency in Karnataka

Coordinates: 16.2°N 77.4°E

Raichur
- Lok Sabha constituency
- Raichur Lok Sabha Constituency Map

Constituency details
- Country: India
- Region: South India
- State: Karnataka
- Assembly constituencies: Shorapur; Shahapur; Yadgir; Raichur Rural; Raichur; Manvi; Devadurga; Lingsugur
- Established: 1952
- Total electors: 19,28,204
- Reservation: ST

Member of Parliament
- 18th Lok Sabha
- Incumbent G Kumar Naik
- Party: Indian National Congress
- Elected year: 2024

Raichur Lok Sabha constituency is one of the 28 Lok Sabha (parliamentary) constituencies in Karnataka state in southern India. This constituency is reserved for the candidates belonging to the Scheduled tribes.

Most Successful parties from Raichur Lok Sabha
1. INC (14 Times) (77.8%)
2. BJP (2 Times) (11.1%)
3. Swatantra Party (1 time) (5.55%)
4. Janata Dal (1 time) (5.55%)

== Assembly segments ==
Raichur Lok Sabha constituency presently comprises the following eight Legislative Assembly segments:

No	Name	District	Member	Party	Party Leading (in 2024)
36	Shorapur (ST)	Yadgir	Raja Venugopal Naik	INC	INC
37	Shahapur	Yadgir	Sharanabasappa Darshanapur	INC	INC
38	Yadgir	Yadgir	Channareddy Patil Tunnur	INC	INC
53	Raichur Rural (ST)	Raichur	Basanagouda Daddal	INC	BJP
54	Raichur	Raichur	Shivaraj Patil	BJP	INC
55	Manvi (ST)	Raichur	G. Hampayya Nayak	INC	INC
56	Devadurga (ST)	Raichur	Karemma	JD(S)	INC
57	Lingsugur (SC)	Raichur	Manappa D.Vajjal	BJP	INC

== Members of Parliament ==
Year	Member	Party
1952 : See Yadgir
1957	G. S. Melkote	Indian National Congress
1962	Jagannath Rao Chandriki	Indian National Congress
1967	Raja Venkatappa Naik	Swatantra Party
1971	Pampan Gowda	Indian National Congress
1977	Rajshekhar Kolur	Indian National Congress
1980	B. V. Desai	Indian National Congress
1984	B. V. Desai	Indian National Congress
1986^	M. Y. Ghorpade	Indian National Congress
1989	Raja Ambanna Nayak Dore	Indian National Congress
1991	Venkatesh Nayak	Indian National Congress
1996	Raja Rangappa Naik	Janata Dal
1998	Venkatesh Nayak	Indian National Congress
1999	Venkatesh Nayak	Indian National Congress
2004	Venkatesh Nayak	Indian National Congress
2009	Sanna Pakirappa	Bharatiya Janata Party
2014	B. V. Nayak	Indian National Congress
2019	Raja Amareshwara Naik	Bharatiya Janata Party
2024	G Kumar Naik	Indian National Congress

== Election results ==
=== General Election 2024 ===
2024 Indian general election: Raichur
Party	Candidate	Votes	%	±%
INC	G Kumar Naik	670,966	51.63	▲8.88
BJP	Raja Amareshwara Naik	591,185	45.49	▼7.72
NOTA	None of the above	9,850	0.76	▼0.57
Majority		79,781	6.14	▼4.32
Turnout		1,304,825	64.90	▲6.66
INC gain from BJP		Swing		

=== 2019 ===
2019 Indian general elections: Raichur
Party	Candidate	Votes	%	±%
BJP	Raja Amareshwara Naik	598,337	53.21	
INC	B. V. Nayak	480,621	42.75	
NOTA	None of the Above	14,921	1.33	
Majority		117,716	10.46	
Turnout		1,124,962	58.34	
BJP gain from INC		Swing		

=== 2014 ===
2014 Indian general elections: Raichur
Party	Candidate	Votes	%	±%
INC	B. V. Nayak	443,659	45.78	
BJP	K. Shivanagouda Naik	442,160	45.63	
JD(S)	D. B. Nayak	21,706	2.24	
BSP	Raja Thimappa Nayak	12,254	1.26	
CPI(M)	M. Nagaraj	6,938	0.72	
NOTA	None of the Above	13,176	1.36	
Majority		1,499	0.15	
Turnout		969,047	58.32	
INC gain from BJP		Swing		

== See also ==
- Kushtagi Lok Sabha constituency
- List of constituencies of the Lok Sabha
- Raichur district
- Yadgir Lok Sabha constituency
