= Arkera =

Arkera Arakere
- Village
- Location within Karnataka Location within India
- Coordinates: 16°16′28.50″N 76°56′57.73″E
- Country: India
- State: Karnataka
- District: Raichur district
- Taluk: Devadurga

Languages
  - Official: Kannada
- Time zone: UTC+5:30 (IST)
- Telephone code: 08537
- Vehicle registration: KA-36

Arkera also spelled as Arakere is a village in the Devadurga taluk of Raichur district in the Indian state of Karnataka. It is located in the Devadurga taluk of Raichur district in Karnataka.

== Demographics ==
As of 2001 India census, Arkera had a population of 5038 with 2630 males and 2408 females.

== See also ==
- Raichur
- Districts of Karnataka
