= Syed Yasin =

Indian politician (1956–2026)

Karnataka Legislative Assembly

Personal details
- Born: 21 September 1956 Raichur, Mysore State, India
- Died: 12 July 2026 (aged 69) Bengaluru, Karnataka, India
- Citizenship: Indian
- Party: Indian National Congress
- Profession: Politician, social worker

Syed Yasin (21 September 1956 – 12 July 2026) was an Indian politician who was a member of the Karnataka Legislative Assembly. He was the only Muslim candidate fielded by the Indian National Congress in Raichur district during the 2008 election. Yasin died at a hospital in Bengaluru on 12 July 2026, at the age of 69.
