= Sanna Pakirappa =

Indian politician

Member of Parliament - 15th Lok Sabha
- In office 18 May 2009 – 18 May 2014
- Constituency: Raichur

Personal details
- Born: 21 September 1958 (age 67) Meenahalli, Bellary district, Karnataka
- Party: Bharatiya Janata Party
- Parent(s): S. Obalappa (father), S. Gangamma (mother)
- Education: Under Matriculate.
- Profession: Businessperson and Agriculturist

Sanna Pakirappa or Sanna Pakkirappa (born 21 September 1958) is an Indian politician and was a member of 15th Lok Sabha from Raichur constituency. He is cousin of B Sriramulu. He contested from Bellary Rural in 2018 Karnataka Assembly Election.

== Political career ==
Pakirappa is member of Bharatiya Janata Party. He was elected to 15th Lok Sabha from Raichur constituency, Karnataka in 2009.

== Positions held ==
#	From	To	Position
1.	2009	2014	MP in 15th Lok Sabha from Raichur.: Member of Committee on Labour. (from 31 Aug. 2009)
