= Annasaheb Jolle =

Indian politician

Annasaheb Shankar Jolle

Member of Parliament, Lok Sabha
- In office 23 May 2019 – 04 June 2024
- Preceded by: Prakash Babanna Hukkeri
- Constituency: Chikkodi

Personal details
- Born: 8 October 1963 (age 62) Examba, Belgaum district, Bombay State (now Karnataka), India
- Political party: Bharatiya Janata Party
- Spouse: Shashikala Jolle
- Children: 2
- Parent(s): Shankar Jolle (father); Laxmibai Jolle (mother)
- Education: Pre University Course

Annasaheb Shankar Jolle (born 1963) is an Indian politician who is the ex Member of Parliament in the Lok Sabha from Chikkodi.

Annasaheb Jolle and his wife Shashikala Jolle both contested on BJP tickets from Chikkodi-Sadalga and Nippani constituencies respectively. However, Annasaheb Jolle lost to Ganesh Hukkeri for the second time whereas Shashikala Jolle emerged victorious. Annasaheb Jolle later won Chikkodi Lok Sabha seat in 2019 Indian general election. Jolle belongs to the Banajiga community, a sub-sect of the Lingayats. while his opposite candidate Hukkeri belongs to the Panchamsali Lingayat community, Both the Hukkeris and the Jolles hail from Examba
