= Raja Amareshwara Naik =

Indian politician

Member of Parliament, 17th Lok Sabha
- In office 26 May 2019 – 04 June 2024
- Preceded by: B V Nayak
- Succeeded by: G Kumar Naik
- Constituency: Raichur

Personal details
- Born: 16 June 1957 (age 68) Guntagula, Raichur district, Karnataka
- Party: Bharatiya Janata Party (2014-Present)
- Other political affiliations: Janata Dal (Secular) (2013-2014); Indian National Congress (Till 2013)
- Spouse: Mohanamba
- Education: B.A., LL.B. (Spl)
- Alma mater: SJM College, Chitradurga, Mysore University and Karnataka University, Karnataka
- Profession: Agriculturist and Social Worker

Raja Amareshwara Nayak is an Indian politician who is the current Member of Parliament in the Lok Sabha from Raichur, Karnataka in the 2019 Indian general election as member of the Bharatiya Janata Party.

== Early life and background ==
Raja Amareshwara Naik was born to Raja Narasimha Naik and Lakshmidevamma on 16 Jun 1957 in Guntagula of Raichur Dist, Karnataka.

Raja Amareshwara Naik completed his B.A., LL.B. (Spl) from SJM College, Chitradurga, Mysore University and Karnataka University, Karnataka.

== Position Held ==
#	From	To	Position
1	1989	1994	MLA (1st term) Karnataka Legislative Assembly.: Minister of State in Government of Karnataka. (1991-1993); Chairperson, SC/ST Legislature Committee, Karnataka Legislative Assembly. (1993-1994)
2	1999	2004	MLA (2nd term) Karnataka Legislative Assembly: Chief Whip, Congress Legislative Party in Karnataka Legislative Assembly. (1999-2000); Minister (Cabinet), Government of Karnataka. (2002-2004)
3	May 2019	Present	MP in 17th Lok Sabha from Raichur.: Member, Standing Committee on Home Affairs. (13 Sept 2019 onwards); Member, Committee on Papers Laid on the Table. (09 Oct 2019 onwards); Member, Consultative Committee, Ministry of Heavy Industries and Public Enterprises
