= 2014 Indian general election in Karnataka =

Per-state electoral results for India's Lok Sabha

Indian general election, 2014 (Karnataka)
- 30 April 2014 & 7 May 2014 (phases 7 & 8)

28 seats
- Turnout: 67.20% (▲8.38%)
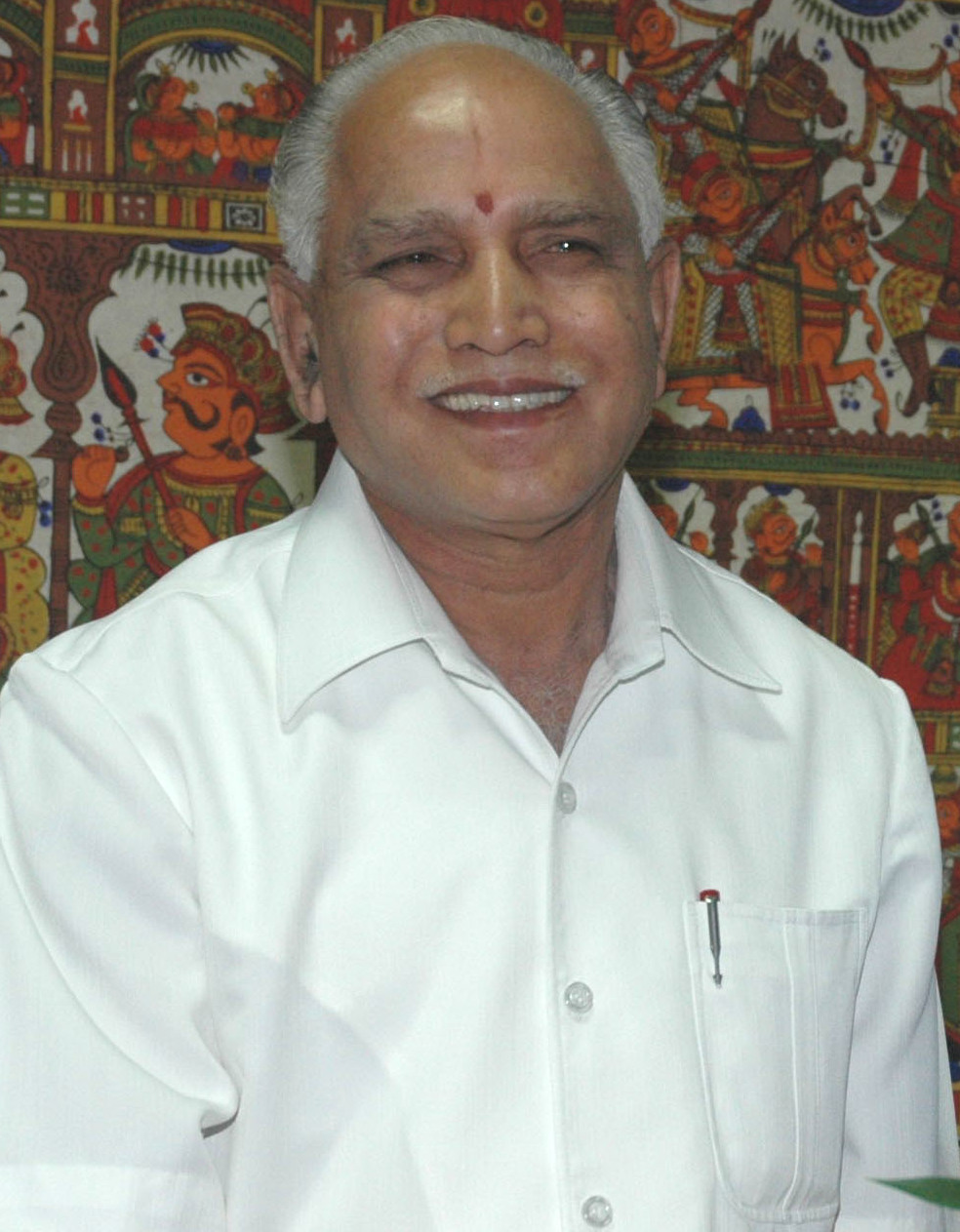

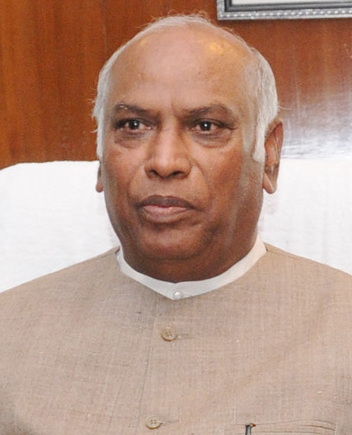

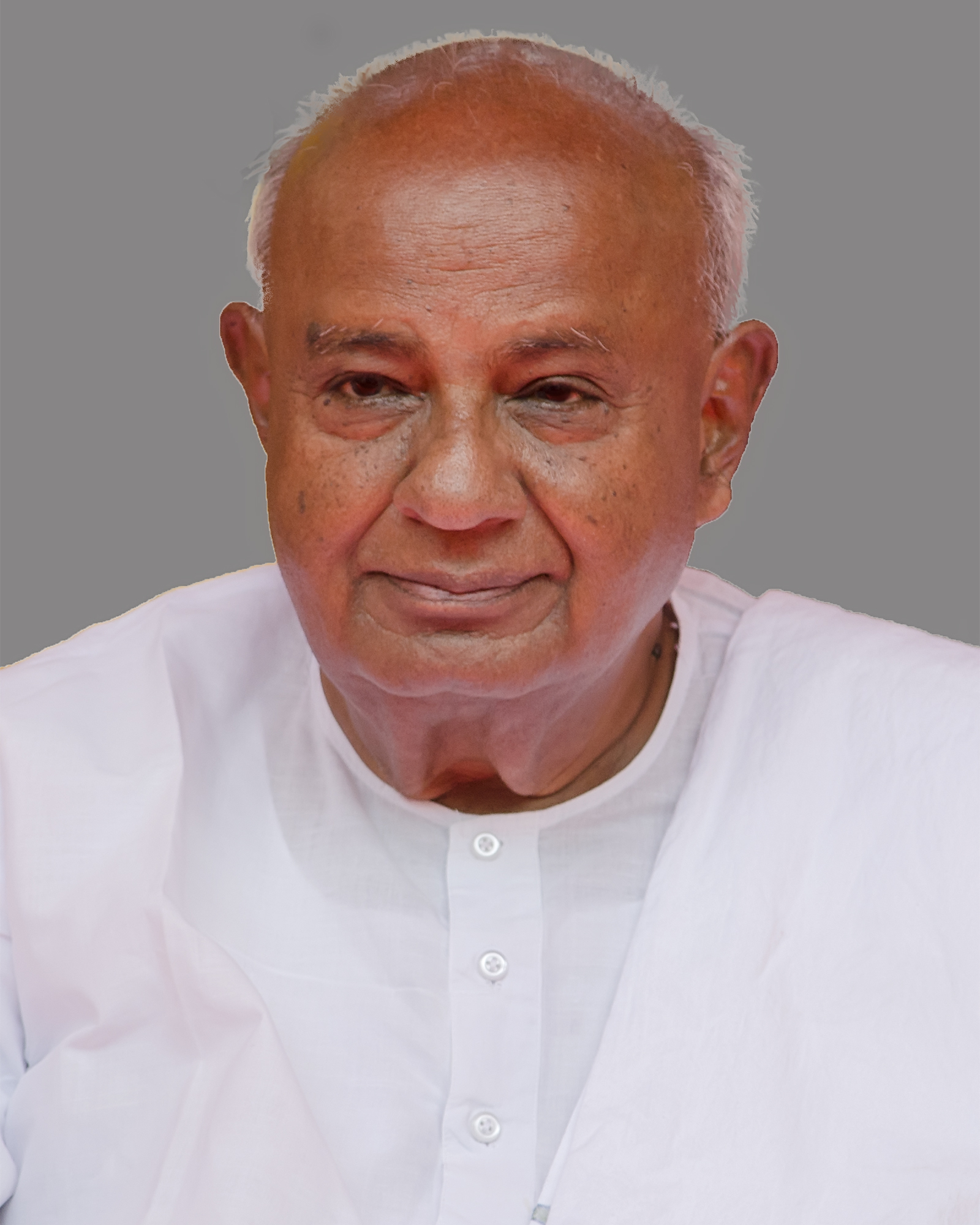
	First party	Second party	Third party
Leader	B. S. Yeddyurappa	Mallikarjun Kharge	H. D. Devegowda
Party	BJP	INC	JD(S)
Leader's seat	Shimoga	Gulbarga	Hassan
Last election	19	6	3
Seats won	17	9	2
Seat change	▼2	▲3	▼1
Percentage	43.00%	40.80%	11.00%
- Seat results by constituency. As this is a FPTP election, seat totals are not determined proportional to each party's total vote share, but instead by the plurality in each constituency.
Prime Minister before election
Manmohan Singh
INC
Prime Minister after election
Narendra Modi
JP

Lok Sabha constituencies in Karnataka

The 2014 Indian general election polls in Karnataka for 28 Lok Sabha seats was held in a single phase on 30 April and 7 May 2014. As of 14 February 2014, the total voter strength of Karnataka is 44,694,658.

The main political parties are Bharatiya Janata Party, Indian National Congress and Janata Dal.

== Parties and alliances ==
Party/Alliance	Flag	Electoral symbol	Leader	Seats contested
Bharatiya Janata Party			B. S. Yediyurappa	28
Indian National Congress			Mallikarjun Kharge	28
Janata Dal (Secular)			H. D. Deve Gowda	25

== List of Candidates ==
Constituency							
Constituency		BJP		INC		JD(S)	
1	Chikkodi	BJP	Ramesh Katti	INC	Prakash Hukkeri	JD(S)	Shrimant Patil
2	Belgaum	BJP	Suresh Angadi	INC	Lakshmi Hebbalkar	JD(S)	Bagwan Nasir
3	Bagalkot	BJP	P. C. Gaddigoudar	INC	Ajay Kumar Sarnaik	JD(S)	Hunashyal Ravi
4	Bijapur	BJP	Ramesh Jigajinagi	INC	Prakash Rathod	JD(S)	K. Shivram
5	Gulbarga	BJP	Revu Naik Belamgi	INC	Mallikarjun Kharge	JD(S)	D. G. Sagar
6	Raichur	BJP	K. Shivanagouda Naik	INC	B. V. Nayak	JD(S)	D. B. Nayak
7	Bidar	BJP	Bhagwanth Khuba	INC	N. Dharam Singh	JD(S)	Bandeppa Kashempur
8	Koppal	BJP	K. S. Amarappa	INC	Basavaraj Hitnal		
9	Bellary	BJP	B. Sriramulu	INC	N. Y. Hanumanthappa	JD(S)	R. Ravinayaka
10	Haveri	BJP	Shivkumar Udasi	INC	Saleem Ahmed	JD(S)	Ravi Menasinakai
11	Dharwad	BJP	Pralhad Joshi	INC	Vinay Kulkarni	JD(S)	B. H. Mallappa
12	Uttara Kannada	BJP	Anantkumar Hegde	INC	Prashant R. Deshpande		
13	Davanagere	BJP	G. M. Siddeswara	INC	S. S. Mallikarjun	JD(S)	Mahima J. Patel
14	Shimoga	BJP	B. S. Yeddyurappa	INC	Manjunath Bhandary	JD(S)	Geetha Shivarajkumar
15	Udupi Chikmagalur	BJP	Shobha Karandlaje	INC	K. Jayaprakash Hegde	JD(S)	V. Dhananjay Kumar
16	Hassan	BJP	C. H. Vijayashankar	INC	A. Manju	JD(S)	H. D. Deve Gowda
17	Dakshina Kannada	BJP	Nalin Kumar Kateel	INC	Janardhana Poojary		
18	Chitradurga	BJP	Janardhana Swamy	INC	B. N. Chandrappa	JD(S)	Gullihatty D. Shekhar
19	Tumkur	BJP	G. S. Basavaraj	INC	S. P. Muddahanumegowda	JD(S)	A. Krishnappa
20	Mandya	BJP	B. Shivalingaiah	INC	Ramya	JD(S)	C. S. Puttaraju
21	Mysore	BJP	Pratap Simha	INC	Adagur H. Vishwanath	JD(S)	Chandrashekaraiah
22	Chamarajanagar	BJP	A. R. Krishnamurthy	INC	R. Dhruvanarayana	JD(S)	Kote M. Shivanna
23	Bangalore Rural	BJP	P. Muniraju Gowda	INC	D. K. Suresh	JD(S)	R. Prabhakara Reddy
24	Bangalore North	BJP	D. V. Sadananda Gowda	INC	C. Narayanaswamy	JD(S)	Abdul Azeem
25	Bangalore Central	BJP	P. C. Mohan	INC	Rizwan Arshad	JD(S)	Nandini Alva
26	Bangalore South	BJP	Ananth Kumar	INC	Nandan Nilekani	JD(S)	Ruth Manorama
27	Chikkballapur	BJP	B. N. Bache Gowda	INC	M. Veerappa Moily	JD(S)	H. D. Kumaraswamy
28	Kolar	BJP	E. M. Narayanaswamy	INC	K. H. Muniyappa	JD(S)	Kolar Kesava

== Opinion polling ==
Conducted in Month(s)	Ref	Polling Organisation/Agency	Sample size					
Conducted in Month(s)	Ref	Polling Organisation/Agency	Sample size	INC	BJP	JD(S)	AAP	Others
Aug–Oct 2013		Times Now-India TV-CVoter	24,284	13	12	3	0	0
Dec 2013 – Jan 2014		India Today-CVoter	21,792	12	13	0	0	3
Jan–Feb 2014		Times Now-India TV-CVoter	14,000	14	11	2	1	0
March 2014		NDTV- Hansa Research	46,571	6	20	2	0	0
March–April 2014		CNN-IBN-Lokniti-CSDS	825	12–18	7–13	1 – 4 (Including Others)	0	1 – 4 (Including JD(S))
April 2014		NDTV- Hansa Research	24,000	14	12	3	0	0

== Election schedule ==
Constituency wise Election schedule are given below–

Polling Day	Phase	Date	Constituencies	Voting Percentage
1	5	17 April	Chikkodi; Belgaum; Bagalkot; Bijapur; Gulbarga; Raichur; Bidar; Koppal; Bellary; Haveri; Dharwad; Uttara Kannada, Karwar; Davanagere; Shimoga; Udupi Chikmagalur; Hassan; Dakshina Kannada; Chitradurga; Tumkur; Mandya; Mysore; Chamarajanagar; Bangalore Rural; Bangalore North; Bangalore Central; Bangalore South; Chikkballapur; Kolar	67.20

== Results ==
=== Result ===
BJP won 17 seats. INC won 9 seats and JD (S) won 2 seats.

17	9	2
BJP	INC	JD(S)

=== Party-Wise Results ===
Party Name	Popular vote			Seats		
Party Name	Votes	%	±pp	Contested	Won	+/−
BJP	1,33,50,285	43.01	▲1.38	28	17	▼2
INC	1,26,66,530	40.81	▲3.16	28	9	▲3
JD(S)	34,06,465	10.97	▼2.60	25	2	▼1
Others	8,74,187	2.82	Steady	157	0	Steady
IND	4,83,513	1.56	▼2.56	196	0	Steady
NOTA	2,57,881	0.83	Steady			
Total	3,10,38,861	100%	-	434	28	-

=== Constituency Wise Results ===
Constituency		Winner				Runner Up				Margin	%
#	Name	Candidate	Party	Votes	%	Candidate	Party	Votes	%	Margin	%
1	Chikkodi	Prakash Hukkeri	INC	474,373	44.27	Ramesh Katti	BJP	471,370	43.99	3,003	0.28
2	Belgaum	Suresh Angadi	BJP	554,417	51.38	Lakshmi Hebbalkar	INC	478,557	44.35	75,860	7.03
3	Bagalkot	P. C. Gaddigoudar	BJP	571,548	52.95	Ajay Kumar Sarnaik	INC	454,988	42.15	116,560	10.80
4	Bijapur	Ramesh Jigajinagi	BJP	471,757	48.80	Prakash Rathod	INC	401,938	41.57	69,819	7.23
5	Gulbarga	Mallikarjun Kharge	INC	507,193	50.82	Revu Naik Belamgi	BJP	432,460	43.33	74,733	7.49
6	Raichur	B. V. Nayak	INC	443,659	45.78	K. Shivanagouda Naik	BJP	442,160	45.63	1,499	0.15
7	Bidar	Bhagwanth Khuba	BJP	459,290	47.68	Dharam Singh	INC	367,068	38.11	92,222	9.57
8	Koppal	K. S. Amarappa	BJP	486,383	48.28	Basavaraj Hitnal	INC	453,969	45.06	32,414	3.22
9	Bellary	B. Sriramulu	BJP	534,406	51.09	N. Y. Hanumanthappa	INC	449,262	42.95	85,144	8.14
10	Haveri	S. C. Udasi	BJP	566,790	50.77	Saleem Ahmed	INC	479,219	42.93	87,571	7.84
11	Dharwad	Pralhad Joshi	BJP	545,395	52.37	Vinay Kulkarni	INC	431,738	41.45	113,657	10.92
12	Uttara Kannada	Anantkumar Hegde	BJP	546,939	54.61	Prashant R Deshpande	INC	406,239	40.56	140,700	14.05
13	Davanagere	G. M. Siddeshwara	BJP	518,894	46.53	S. S. Mallikarjun	INC	501,287	44.95	17,607	1.58
14	Shimoga	B. S. Yediyurappa	BJP	606,216	53.63	Manjunath Bhandary	INC	242,911	21.49	363,305	32.14
15	Udupi Chikmagalur	Shobha Karandlaje	BJP	581,168	56.19	K. Jayaprakash Hegde	INC	399,525	38.63	181,643	17.56
16	Hassan	H. D. Devegowda	JD(S)	509,841	44.43	A. Manju	INC	409,379	35.67	100,462	8.76
17	Dakshina Kannada	Nalin Kumar Kateel	BJP	642,739	53.23	Janardhana Poojary	INC	499,030	41.32	143,709	11.91
18	Chitradurga	B. N. Chandrappa	INC	467,511	42.59	Janardhana Swamy	BJP	366,220	33.36	101,291	9.23
19	Tumkur	S. P. Muddahanumegowda	INC	429,868	39.01	G. S. Basavaraj	BJP	355,827	32.29	74,041	6.72
20	Mandya	C. S. Puttaraju	JD(S)	524,370	43.95	Ramya	INC	518,852	43.49	5,518	0.46
21	Mysore	Pratap Simha	BJP	503,908	43.45	Adagur H. Vishwanath	INC	472,300	40.73	31,608	2.72
22	Chamarajanagar	R. Dhruvanarayana	INC	567,782	50.10	A. R. Krishnamurthy	BJP	426,600	37.64	141,182	12.46
23	Bangalore Rural	D. K. Suresh	INC	652,723	44.84	P. Muniraju Gowda	BJP	421,243	28.94	231,480	15.90
24	Bangalore North	D. V. Sadananda Gowda	BJP	718,326	52.91	C. Narayanaswamy	INC	488,562	35.99	229,764	16.92
25	Bangalore Central	P. C. Mohan	BJP	557,130	51.85	Rizwan Arshad	INC	419,630	39.05	137,500	12.80
26	Bangalore South	Ananth Kumar	BJP	633,816	56.88	Nandan Nilekani	INC	405,241	36.37	228,575	20.51
27	Chikkballapur	Veerappa Moily	INC	424,800	33.61	B. N. Bache Gowda	BJP	415,280	32.86	9,520	0.75
28	Kolar	K. H. Muniyappa	INC	418,926	37.16	Kolar Kesava	JD(S)	371,076	32.92	47,850	4.24

=== Bye-election ===
- By-elections were conducted after sitting MPs resigned to assume office as MLAs following the 2018 elections. The following were elected on 6 November 2018.

Constituency		Winner				Runner-up				Margin	
Constituency		Candidate	Party	Votes	%	Candidate	Party	Votes	%	Votes	%
9	Bellary (ST)	V. S. Ugrappa	INC	628,365	59.99	J. Shantha	BJP	385,204	36.78	243,161	23.21
14	Shimoga	B. Y. Raghavendra	BJP	543,306	50.73	Madhu Bangarappa	JD(S)	491,158	45.86	52,148	4.87
20	Mandya	L. R. Shivarame Gowda	JD(S)	569,347	63.79	D. R. Siddaramaiah	BJP	244,404	27.38	324,943	36.41

== Post-election Union Council of Ministers from Karnataka ==
#	Name	Constituency	Designation	Department	From	To	Party
1	Ananth Kumar	Bangalore South	Cabinet Minister	Chemicals and Fertilizers	27 May 2014	12 November 2018	BJP
1	Ananth Kumar	Bangalore South	Cabinet Minister	Parliamentary Affairs	5 July 2016	12 November 2018	BJP
2	D. V. Sadananda Gowda	Bangalore North	Cabinet Minister	Railways	27 May 2014	9 November 2014	BJP
2	D. V. Sadananda Gowda	Bangalore North	Cabinet Minister	Law and Justice	9 November 2014	5 July 2016	BJP
2	D. V. Sadananda Gowda	Bangalore North	Cabinet Minister	Statistics and Programme Implementation	5 July 2016	30 May 2019	BJP
2	D. V. Sadananda Gowda	Bangalore North	Cabinet Minister	Chemicals and Fertilizers	13 November 2018	30 May 2019	BJP
3	M. Venkaiah Naidu	Rajya Sabha (Karnataka)	Cabinet Minister	Urban Development; Housing and Urban Poverty Alleviation	27 May 2014	17 July 2017	BJP
3	M. Venkaiah Naidu	Rajya Sabha (Karnataka)	Cabinet Minister	Parliamentary Affairs	27 May 2014	5 July 2016	BJP
3	M. Venkaiah Naidu	Rajya Sabha (Karnataka)	Cabinet Minister	Information and Broadcasting	5 July 2016	17 July 2017	BJP
4	Nirmala Sitharaman	Rajya Sabha (Karnataka)	MoS (I/C)	Commerce and Industry	27 May 2014	3 September 2017	BJP
4	Nirmala Sitharaman	Rajya Sabha (Karnataka)	MoS	Finance; Corporate Affairs	27 May 2014	9 November 2014	BJP
4	Nirmala Sitharaman	Rajya Sabha (Karnataka)	Cabinet Minister	Defence	3 September 2017	30 May 2019	BJP
5	G. M. Siddeshwara	Davanagere	MoS	Civil Aviation	27 May 2014	9 November 2014	BJP
5	G. M. Siddeshwara	Davanagere	MoS	Heavy Industries and Public Enterprises	9 November 2014	12 July 2016	BJP
6	Ramesh Jigajinagi	Bijapur	MoS	Drinking Water and Sanitation	5 July 2016	30 May 2019	BJP
7	Anant Kumar Hegde	Uttara Kannada	MoS	Skill Development and Entrepreneurship	3 September 2017	30 May 2019	BJP

Note:

- Nirmala Sitharaman represented Andhra Pradesh in the Rajya Sabha until 2016, after which she represented Karnataka.
- M. Venkaiah Naidu represented Karnataka in the Rajya Sabha until July 2016, after which he represented Rajasthan.

== Assembly Segment wise lead ==
Party	Assembly segments	Position in Assembly (as of 2018 election)
Bharatiya Janata Party	132	104
Indian National Congress	77	80
Janata Dal (Secular)	15	37
Others	0	3
Total	224	
