= Bharamasagara Assembly constituency =

Former Assembly constituency in Karnataka, India

Coordinates: 14.372091°N 76.190570°E

Bharamasagara
- Former constituency for the Karnataka Legislative Assembly

Constituency details
- Country: India
- Region: South India
- State: Karnataka
- Division: Bangalore
- District: Chitradurga
- Lok Sabha constituency: Chitradurga
- Established: 1967
- Abolished: 2008
- Reservation: SC

Bharamasagara Assembly constituency was one of the constituencies in Karnataka state assembly in India until 2008 when it was made defunct. It was part of Chitradurga Lok Sabha constituency.

== Members of the Legislative Assembly ==
Election	Member	Party
1967	G. Duggappa	Independent politician
1972	H. B. Lakshmana	Independent politician
1978	T. Chowdaiah	Indian National Congress
1983	Shivamurthy. K	Janata Party
1985	B. M. Thippesamy	Janata Party
1989	K. Shiva Murthy	Indian National Congress
1994	M. Chandrappa	Janata Dal
1999	M. Chandrappa	Janata Dal
2004	H. Anjaneya	Janata Dal

== Election results ==
=== Assembly Election 2004 ===
2004 Karnataka Legislative Assembly election : Bharamasagara
Party	Candidate	Votes	%	±%
JD(U)	H. Anjaneya	47,673	45.43%	▲5.57
INC	M. Chandrappa	31,104	29.64%	▼0.62
JD(S)	Anandappa. H	18,237	17.38%	▲15.84
JP	Purushothama Naik. K. G	3,406	3.25%	New
Independent	Suvarna. H	2,179	2.08%	New
Kannada Nadu Party	Ramesh. N	1,442	1.37%	New
SP	Mahanthash. B	891	0.85%	New
Margin of victory		16,569	15.79%	▲6.19
Turnout		104,959	70.61%	▼3.13
Total valid votes		104,932		
Registered electors		148,642		▲9.96
JD(U) hold		Swing	▲5.57	

=== Assembly Election 1999 ===
1999 Karnataka Legislative Assembly election : Bharamasagara
Party	Candidate	Votes	%	±%
JD(U)	M. Chandrappa	37,194	39.86%	New
INC	H. Anjaneya	28,240	30.26%	▲10.08
Independent	Shivamurthy. K	22,290	23.89%	New
Independent	M. Jayanna	1,492	1.60%	New
JD(S)	Sn Balaji	1,434	1.54%	New
Independent	Eshwaraniaka. J	1,231	1.32%	New
Margin of victory		8,954	9.60%	▼6.18
Turnout		99,677	73.74%	▲5.04
Total valid votes		93,314		
Rejected ballots		6,316	6.34%	▲3.58
Registered electors		135,181		▲2.87
JD(U) gain from JD		Swing	▲2.70	

=== Assembly Election 1994 ===
1994 Karnataka Legislative Assembly election : Bharamasagara
Party	Candidate	Votes	%	±%
JD	M. Chandrappa	32,617	37.16%	▼0.11
BJP	K. R. Eswar Naik	18,770	21.39%	New
INC	H. Anjaneya	17,715	20.18%	▼29.06
INC	N. Jayadevanaik	10,317	11.75%	New
Independent	S. M. Sadanandaiah	4,579	5.22%	New
BSP	M. Jayanna	2,800	3.19%	New
Margin of victory		13,847	15.78%	▲3.81
Turnout		90,281	68.70%	▲2.63
Total valid votes		87,770		
Rejected ballots		2,492	2.76%	▼4.32
Registered electors		131,405		▲10.03
JD gain from INC		Swing	▼12.08	

=== Assembly Election 1989 ===
1989 Karnataka Legislative Assembly election : Bharamasagara
Party	Candidate	Votes	%	±%
INC	K. Shiva Murthy	36,103	49.24%	▲1.32
JD	M. Chandrappa	27,330	37.27%	New
Bharatiya Rashtriya Party	M. Jayanna	4,672	6.37%	New
JP	A. Thimmappa	3,645	4.97%	New
Independent	Kotreshi	544	0.74%	New
Margin of victory		8,773	11.97%	▲11.54
Turnout		78,909	66.07%	▼4.04
Total valid votes		73,321		
Rejected ballots		5,588	7.08%	▲5.17
Registered electors		119,424		▲30.39
INC gain from JP		Swing	▲0.89	

=== Assembly Election 1985 ===
1985 Karnataka Legislative Assembly election : Bharamasagara
Party	Candidate	Votes	%	±%
JP	B. M. Thippesamy	30,450	48.35%	▼15.39
INC	Shivamurthy. K	30,180	47.92%	▲12.50
Independent	Lachanaika	609	0.97%	New
Independent	C. Siddappa	495	0.79%	New
BJP	N. Chandrahas	398	0.63%	New
Independent	A. R. Basavaraju	387	0.61%	New
Margin of victory		270	0.43%	▼27.89
Turnout		64,209	70.11%	▼0.16
Total valid votes		62,980		
Rejected ballots		1,229	1.91%	▼0.43
Registered electors		91,587		▲13.94
JP hold		Swing	▼15.39	

=== Assembly Election 1983 ===
1983 Karnataka Legislative Assembly election : Bharamasagara
Party	Candidate	Votes	%	±%
JP	Shivamurthy. K	35,163	63.74%	▲33.96
INC	T. Chowdaiah	19,540	35.42%	▲28.56
Independent	Krishanappa	464	0.84%	New
Margin of victory		15,623	28.32%	▲5.03
Turnout		56,490	70.27%	▲1.88
Total valid votes		55,167		
Rejected ballots		1,323	2.34%	▼0.75
Registered electors		80,385		▲8.25
JP gain from INC(I)		Swing	▲10.66	

=== Assembly Election 1978 ===
1978 Karnataka Legislative Assembly election : Bharamasagara
Party	Candidate	Votes	%	±%
INC(I)	T. Chowdaiah	26,124	53.08%	New
JP	H. Putta Bai	14,659	29.78%	New
Independent	Eswaranaik	5,059	10.28%	New
INC	S. Thippa Naik	3,375	6.86%	▼24.62
Margin of victory		11,465	23.29%	▲22.66
Turnout		50,787	68.39%	▲17.04
Total valid votes		49,217		
Rejected ballots		1,570	3.09%	▲3.09
Registered electors		74,257		▲0.05
INC(I) gain from Independent		Swing	▲20.96	

=== Assembly Election 1972 ===
1972 Mysore State Legislative Assembly election : Bharamasagara
Party	Candidate	Votes	%	±%
Independent	H. B. Lakshmana	11,871	32.12%	New
INC	T. Chowdaiah	11,637	31.48%	▼13.54
INC(O)	M. Hanumanthappa	10,993	29.74%	New
Independent	Nagasanhally Ramappa	1,279	3.46%	New
Independent	Nijaguna Naik	1,181	3.20%	New
Margin of victory		234	0.63%	▼9.32
Turnout		38,115	51.35%	▼10.08
Total valid votes		36,961		
Registered electors		74,220		▲27.73
Independent hold		Swing	▼22.86	

=== Assembly Election 1967 ===
1967 Mysore State Legislative Assembly election : Bharamasagara
Party	Candidate	Votes	%	±%
Independent	G. Duggappa	18,617	54.98%	New
INC	M. N. K. Singh	15,247	45.02%	New
Margin of victory		3,370	9.95%	
Turnout		35,698	61.43%	
Total valid votes		33,864		
Registered electors		58,107		
Independent win (new seat)				

== See also ==
- List of constituencies of the Karnataka Legislative Assembly
