= 2009 Indian general election in Karnataka =

State Elections

Indian general election in Karnataka, 2009
- April–May 2009

28 seats
- Turnout: 58.82%
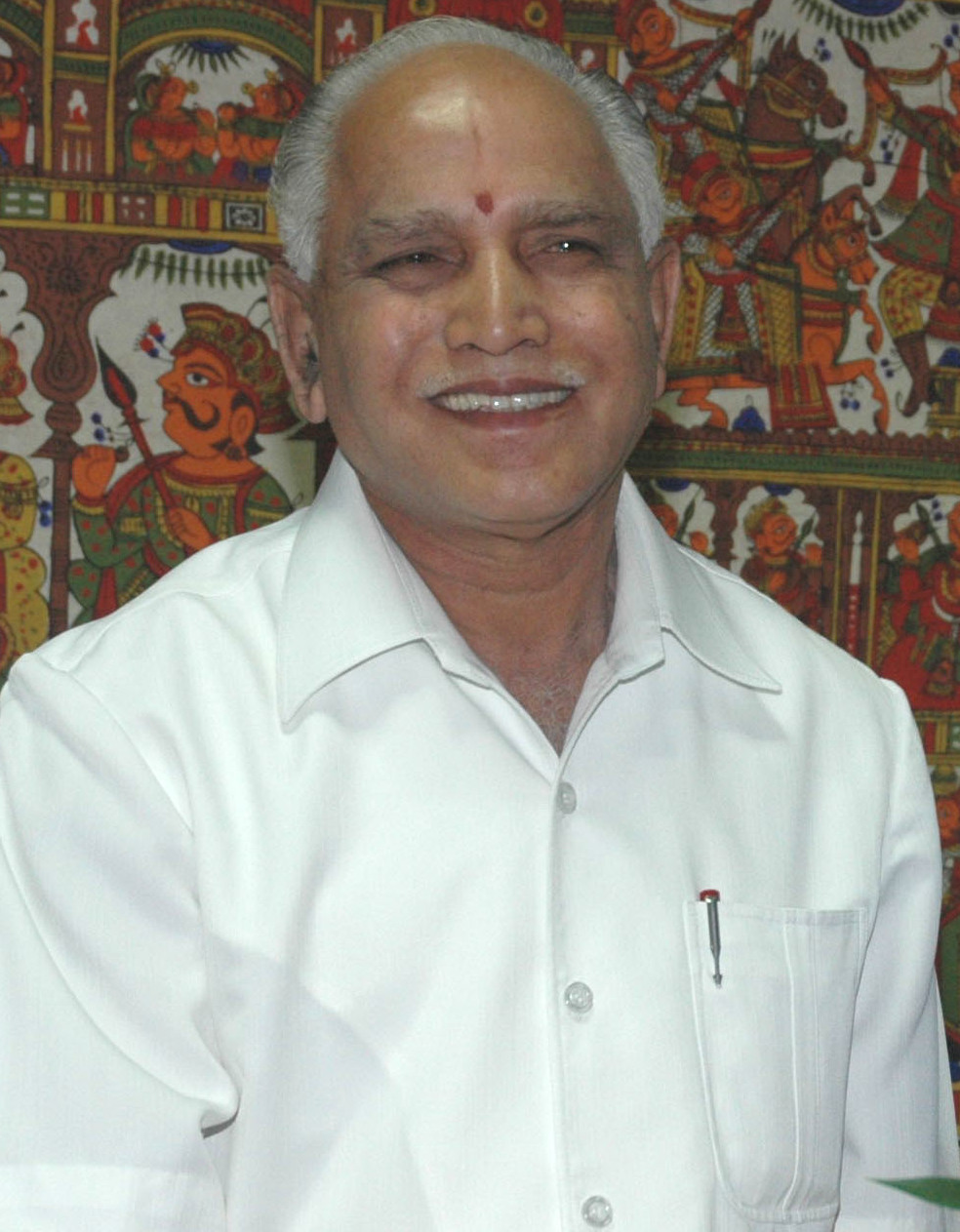

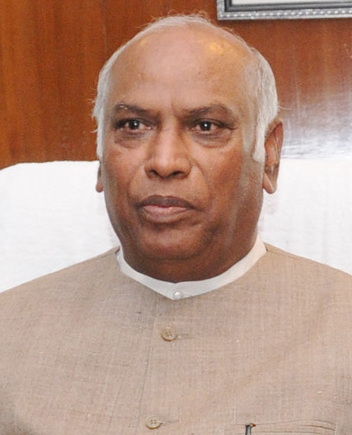

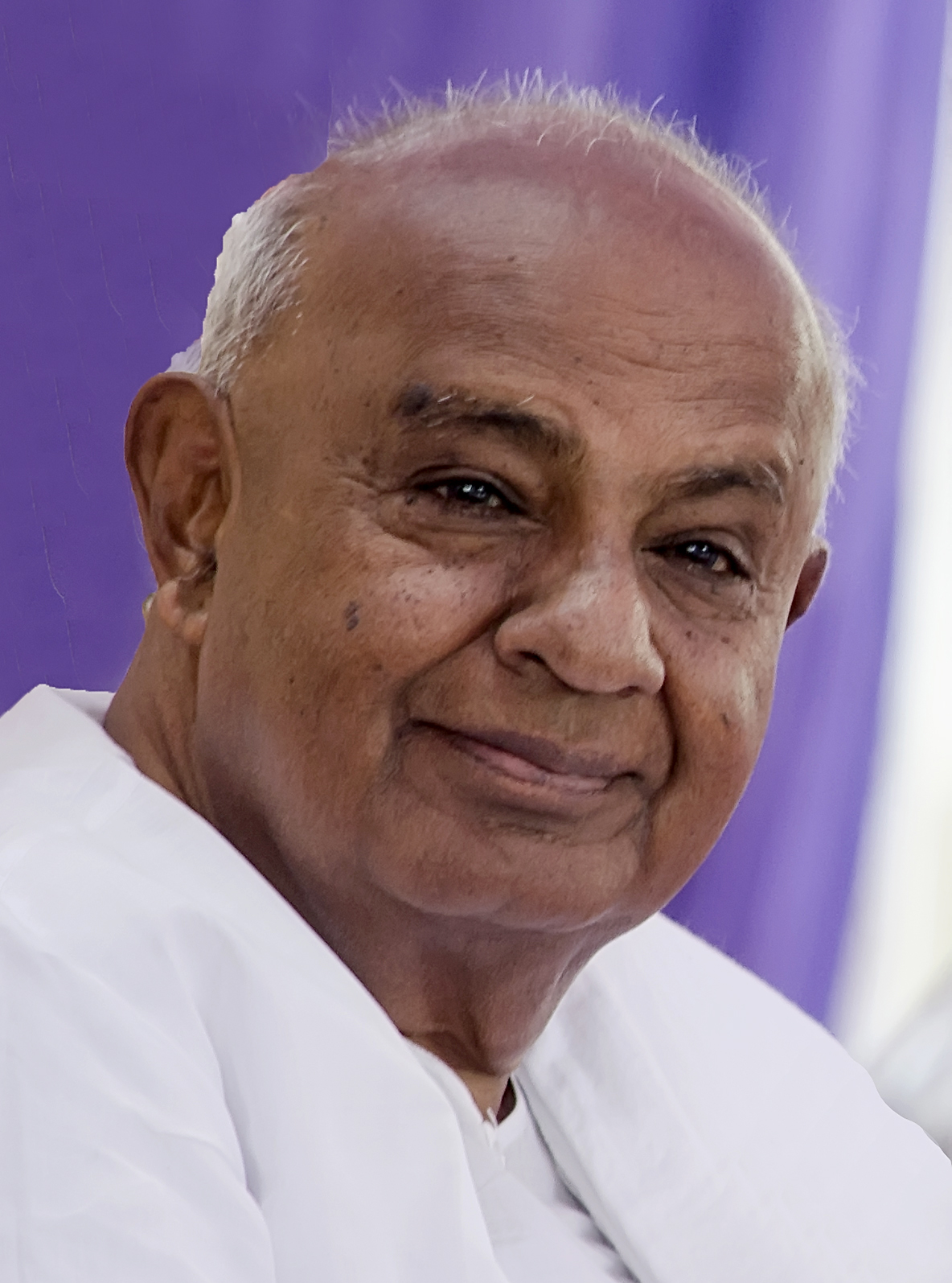
| | First party | Second party |
|---|---|---|
| Leader | B. S. Yeddyurappa | Mallikarjun Kharge |
| Party | BJP | INC |
| Alliance | NDA | UPA |
| Leader's seat | Did not contest | Gulbarga |
| Last election | 18 | 8 |
| Seats won | 19 | 6 |
| Seat change | ▲1 | ▼2 |
| Percentage | 41.63% | 37.65% |
| | Third party |
| Leader | H. D. Devegowda |
| Party | JD(S) |
| Alliance | Third Front |
| Leader's seat | Hassan |
| Last election | 2 |
| Seats won | 3 |
| Seat change | ▲1 |
| Percentage | 13.57% |
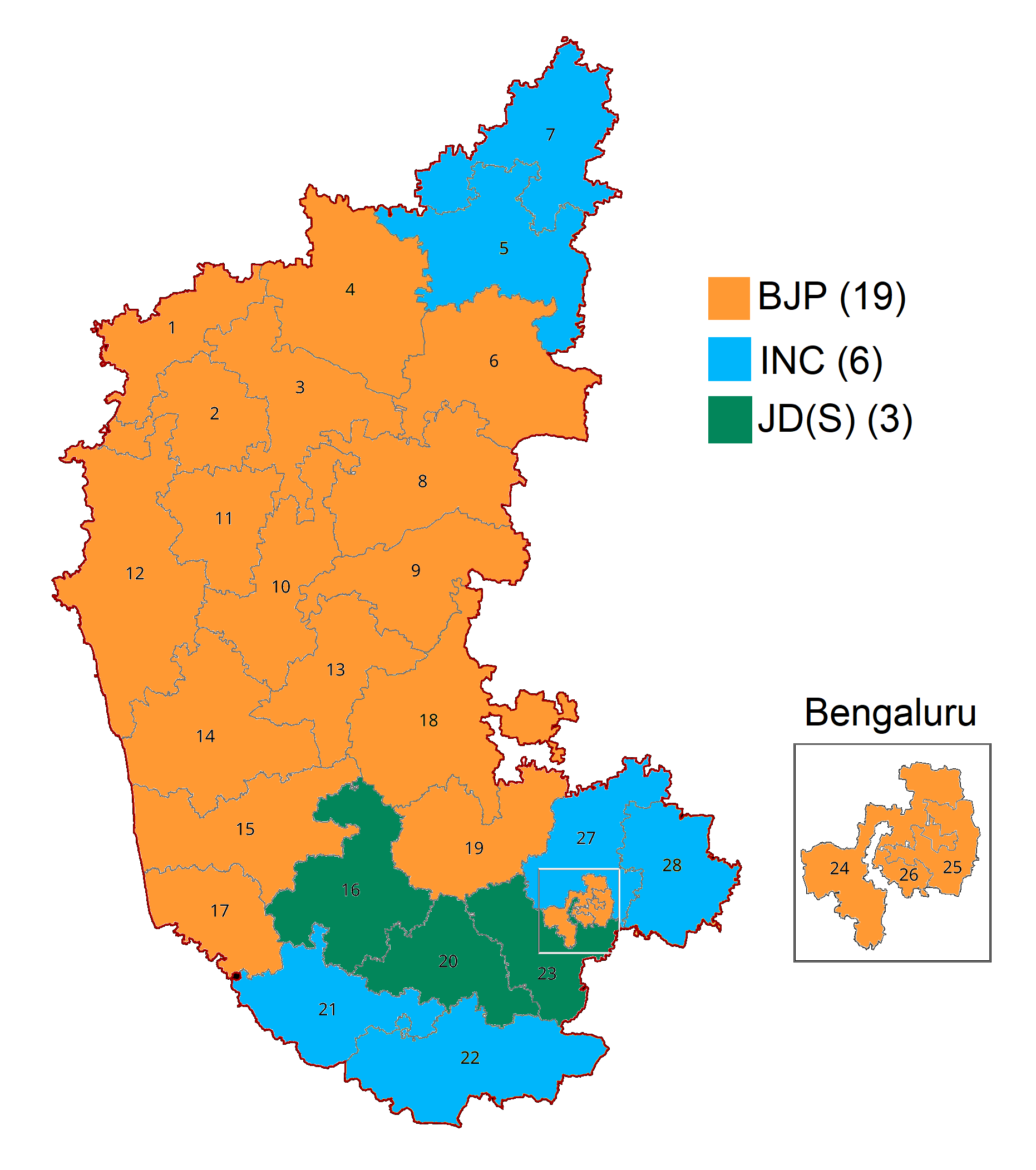
- Seat results by constituency. As this is a FPTP election, seat totals are not determined proportional to each party's total vote share, but instead by the plurality in each constituency.
Prime Minister before election
Manmohan Singh
INC
Prime Minister after election
Manmohan Singh
INC

The 2009 Indian general election in Karnataka, occurred for 28 seats in the state.

== Parties and alliances ==
| Party/Alliance | Flag | Electoral symbol | Leader | Seats contested |
|---|---|---|---|---|
| Bharatiya Janata Party | | | B. S. Yediyurappa | 28 |
| Indian National Congress | | | S. M. Krishna | 28 |
| Janata Dal (Secular) | | | H. D. Deve Gowda | 21 |

== List of Candidates ==
| Constituency | | BJP | | INC | | JD(S) | |
| # | Name | Party | Candidate | Party | Candidate | Party | Candidate |
|---|---|---|---|---|---|---|---|
| 1 | Chikkodi | BJP | Ramesh Katti | INC | Prakash Hukkeri | | |
| 2 | Belgaum | BJP | Suresh Angadi | INC | Amarsinh Vasantrao Patil | JD(S) | A. B. Patil |
| 3 | Bagalkot | BJP | P. C. Gaddigoudar | INC | J. T. Patil | | |
| 4 | Bijapur | BJP | Ramesh Jigajinagi | INC | Prakash K. Rathod | JD(S) | A. V. Basalingappa |
| 5 | Gulbarga | BJP | Revu Naik Belamgi | INC | Mallikarjun Kharge | JD(S) | Babu Honna Naik |
| 6 | Raichur | BJP | Sanna Pakirappa | INC | Raja Venkatappa Naik | JD(S) | K. Devanna Naik |
| 7 | Bidar | BJP | G. Nagamarapalli | INC | N. Dharam Singh | JD(S) | Subhash Tippanna Nelge |
| 8 | Koppal | BJP | S. Shivanagouda | INC | Basavaraj Rayareddy | JD(S) | Ansari Iqbal |
| 9 | Bellary | BJP | J. Shantha | INC | N. Y. Hanumanthappa | | |
| 10 | Haveri | BJP | S. C. Udasi | INC | Saleem Ahmed | JD(S) | Shivkumargoud S. Patil |
| 11 | Dharwad | BJP | Pralhad Joshi | INC | Manjunath Kunnur | | |
| 12 | Uttara Kannada | BJP | Anantkumar Hegde | INC | Margaret Alva | JD(S) | V. D. Hegade |
| 13 | Davanagere | BJP | G. M. Siddeshwara | INC | S. S. Mallikarjuna | JD(S) | K. B. Kallerudreshappa |
| 14 | Shimoga | BJP | B. Y. Raghavendra | INC | S. Bangarappa | | |
| 15 | Udupi Chikmagalur | BJP | D. V. Sadananda Gowda | INC | K. Jayaprakash Hegde | | |
| 16 | Hassan | BJP | K. H. Hanume Gowda | INC | B. Shivaramu | JD(S) | H. D. Deve Gowda |
| 17 | Dakshina Kannada | BJP | Nalin Kumar Kateel | INC | Janardhana Poojary | | |
| 18 | Chitradurga | BJP | Janardhana Swamy | INC | Dr. B. Thippeswamy | JD(S) | M. Rathnakar |
| 19 | Tumkur | BJP | G. S. Basavaraj | INC | P. Kodandaramaiah | JD(S) | S. P. Muddahanumegowda |
| 20 | Mandya | BJP | L. R. Shivarame Gowda | INC | M. H. Ambareesh | JD(S) | N. Chaluvaraya Swamy |
| 21 | Mysore | BJP | C. H. Vijayashankar | INC | Adagur H. Vishwanath | JD(S) | B. A. Jivijaya |
| 22 | Chamarajanagar | BJP | A. R. Krishnamurthy | INC | R. Dhruvanarayana | JD(S) | Kote M. Shivanna |
| 23 | Bangalore Rural | BJP | C. P. Yogeeshwara | INC | Tejaswini Gowda | JD(S) | H. D. Kumaraswamy |
| 24 | Bangalore North | BJP | D. B. Chandre Gowda | INC | C. K. Jaffer Sharief | JD(S) | R. Surendra Babu |
| 25 | Bangalore Central | BJP | P. C. Mohan | INC | H. T. Sangliana | JD(S) | B. Z. Zameer Ahmed Khan |
| 26 | Bangalore South | BJP | Ananth Kumar | INC | Krishna Byre Gowda | JD(S) | Prof. Radhakrishna |
| 27 | Chikballapur | BJP | C. Aswathanarayana | INC | M. Veerappa Moily | JD(S) | C. R. Manohar |
| 28 | Kolar | BJP | D. S. Veeraiah | INC | K. H. Muniyappa | JD(S) | G. Chandranna |

== Results ==
| Party Name | Popular vote | | | Seats | | |
| Party Name | Votes | % | ±pp | Contested | Won | +/− |
|---|---|---|---|---|---|---|
| BJP | 1,02,28,790 | 41.63 | ▲6.86 | 28 | 19 | ▲1 |
| INC | 92,50,984 | 37.65 | ▲0.83 | 28 | 6 | ▼2 |
| JD(S) | 33,35,530 | 13.57 | ▼6.88 | 21 | 3 | ▲1 |
| Others | 7,44,961 | 3.03 | Steady | 90 | 0 | Steady |
| IND | 10,12,448 | 4.12 | ▲1.78 | 260 | 0 | Steady |
| Total | 2,45,72,713 | 100% | - | 427 | 28 | - |

== List of elected MPs ==
Source: Election Commission of India
| Constituency | | Winner | | | | Runner Up | | | | Margin | % |
| # | Name | Candidate | Party | Votes | % | Candidate | Party | Votes | % | Margin | % |
|---|---|---|---|---|---|---|---|---|---|---|---|
| 1 | Chikkodi | Ramesh Katti | BJP | 438,081 | 50.48 | Prakash Hukkeri | INC | 382,794 | 44.11 | 55,287 | 6.37 |
| 2 | Belgaum | Suresh Angadi | BJP | 384,324 | 50.93 | A. Vasantrao Patil | INC | 265,637 | 35.20 | 118,687 | 15.73 |
| 3 | Bagalkot | P. C. Gaddigoudar | BJP | 413,272 | 48.06 | J. T. Patil | INC | 377,826 | 43.94 | 35,446 | 4.12 |
| 4 | Bijapur | Ramesh Jigajinagi | BJP | 308,939 | 47.56 | Prakash K. Rathod | INC | 266,522 | 41.03 | 42,417 | 6.53 |
| 5 | Gulbarga | Mallikarjun Kharge | INC | 345,241 | 45.46 | Revu Naik Belamgi | BJP | 331,837 | 43.70 | 13,404 | 1.76 |
| 6 | Raichur | Sanna Pakirappa | BJP | 316,450 | 46.38 | Raja Venkatappa Naik | INC | 285,814 | 41.89 | 30,636 | 4.49 |
| 7 | Bidar | Dharam Singh | INC | 337,957 | 43.37 | G. Nagamarapalli | BJP | 298,338 | 38.29 | 39,619 | 5.08 |
| 8 | Koppal | S. Shivanagouda | BJP | 291,693 | 38.65 | Basavaraj Rayareddy | INC | 209,904 | 27.81 | 81,789 | 10.84 |
| 9 | Bellary | J. Shantha | BJP | 402,213 | 46.72 | N. Y. Hanumanthappa | INC | 399,970 | 46.46 | 2,243 | 0.26 |
| 10 | Haveri | S. C. Udasi | BJP | 430,293 | 49.33 | Saleem Ahmed | INC | 342,373 | 39.25 | 87,920 | 10.08 |
| 11 | Dharwad | Pralhad Joshi | BJP | 446,786 | 55.97 | Manjunath Channappa | INC | 309,123 | 38.73 | 137,663 | 17.24 |
| 12 | Uttara Kannada | Anantkumar Hegde | BJP | 339,300 | 44.63 | Margaret Alva | INC | 316,531 | 41.63 | 22,769 | 3.00 |
| 13 | Davanagere | G. M. Siddeshwara | BJP | 423,447 | 46.67 | S. S. Mallikarjun | INC | 421,423 | 46.45 | 2,024 | 0.22 |
| 14 | Shimoga | B. Y. Raghavendra | BJP | 482,783 | 50.58 | Sarekoppa Bangarappa | INC | 429,890 | 45.04 | 52,893 | 5.54 |
| 15 | Udupi Chikmagalur | Sadananda Gowda | BJP | 401,441 | 48.09 | K. Jayaprakash Hegde | INC | 374,423 | 44.86 | 27,018 | 3.23 |
| 16 | Hassan | H. D. Devegowda | JD(S) | 496,429 | 50.64 | K. H. Hanume Gowda | BJP | 205,316 | 20.94 | 291,113 | 29.70 |
| 17 | Dakshina Kannada | Nalin Kumar Kateel | BJP | 499,385 | 49.16 | Janardhana Poojary | INC | 458,965 | 45.18 | 40,420 | 3.98 |
| 18 | Chitradurga | Janardhana Swamy | BJP | 370,920 | 44.37 | Dr. B. Thippeswamy | INC | 235,349 | 28.15 | 135,571 | 16.22 |
| 19 | Tumkur | G. S. Basavaraj | BJP | 331,064 | 36.79 | S. P. Muddahanumegowda | JD(S) | 309,619 | 34.41 | 21,445 | 2.38 |
| 20 | Mandya | N. Chaluvaraya Swamy | JD(S) | 384,443 | 37.26 | Ambareesh | INC | 360,943 | 34.99 | 23,500 | 2.27 |
| 21 | Mysore | Adagur H. Vishwanath | INC | 354,810 | 36.43 | C. H. Vijayashankar | BJP | 347,119 | 35.64 | 7,691 | 0.79 |
| 22 | Chamarajanagar | R. Dhruvanarayana | INC | 369,970 | 38.00 | A. R. Krishnamurthy | BJP | 365,968 | 37.59 | 4,002 | 0.41 |
| 23 | Bangalore Rural | H. D. Kumaraswamy | JD(S) | 493,302 | 44.73 | C. P. Yogeshwara | BJP | 363,027 | 32.92 | 130,275 | 11.81 |
| 24 | Bangalore North | D. B. Chandregowda | BJP | 452,920 | 45.22 | C. K. Jaffer Sharief | INC | 393,255 | 39.26 | 59,665 | 5.96 |
| 25 | Bangalore Central | P. C. Mohan | BJP | 340,162 | 40.16 | H. T. Sangliana | INC | 304,944 | 36.00 | 35,218 | 4.16 |
| 26 | Bangalore South | Ananth Kumar | BJP | 437,953 | 48.20 | Krishna Byre Gowda | INC | 400,341 | 44.06 | 37,612 | 4.14 |
| 27 | Chikkballapur | Veerappa Moily | INC | 390,500 | 39.90 | C. Aswathanarayana | BJP | 339,119 | 34.65 | 51,381 | 5.25 |
| 28 | Kolar | K. H. Muniyappa | INC | 344,771 | 37.18 | D. S. Veeraiah | BJP | 321,765 | 34.70 | 23,006 | 2.48 |

== Post-election Union Council of Ministers from Karnataka ==
| # | Name | Constituency | Designation | Department | From | To | Party |
|---|---|---|---|---|---|---|---|
| 1 | S. M. Krishna | Rajya Sabha | Cabinet Minister | External Affairs | 23 May 2009 | 27 October 2012 | INC |
| 2 | M. Veerappa Moily | Chikkballapur | Cabinet Minister | Law and Justice | 28 May 2009 | 12 July 2011 | INC |
| 2 | M. Veerappa Moily | Chikkballapur | Cabinet Minister | Corporate Affairs | 12 July 2011 | 28 October 2012 | INC |
| 2 | M. Veerappa Moily | Chikkballapur | Cabinet Minister | Power | 31 July 2012 | 28 October 2012 | INC |
| 2 | M. Veerappa Moily | Chikkballapur | Cabinet Minister | Petroleum and Natural Gas | 28 October 2012 | 26 May 2014 | INC |
| 2 | M. Veerappa Moily | Chikkballapur | Cabinet Minister | Environment and Forests | 21 December 2013 | 26 May 2014 | INC |
| 3 | Mallikarjun Kharge | Gulbarga | Cabinet Minister | Labour and Employment | 28 May 2009 | 17 June 2013 | INC |
| 3 | Mallikarjun Kharge | Gulbarga | Cabinet Minister | Railways | 17 June 2013 | 26 May 2014 | INC |
| 3 | Mallikarjun Kharge | Gulbarga | Cabinet Minister | Social Justice and Empowerment | 28 January 2014 | 26 May 2014 | INC |
| 4 | Oscar Fernandes | Rajya Sabha | Cabinet Minister | Road Transport and Highways | 17 June 2013 | 26 May 2014 | INC |
| 4 | Oscar Fernandes | Rajya Sabha | Cabinet Minister | Labour and Employment | 15 December 2013 | 26 May 2014 | INC |
| 5 | K. Rahman Khan | Rajya Sabha | Cabinet Minister | Minority Affairs | 28 October 2012 | 26 May 2014 | INC |
| 6 | K. H. Muniyappa | Kolar | MoS | Railways | 28 May 2009 | 28 October 2012 | INC |
| 6 | K. H. Muniyappa | Kolar | MoS (I/C) | Micro, Small and Medium Enterprises | 28 October 2012 | 26 May 2014 | INC |

== Map gallery ==
Lok Sabha constituencies in Karnataka

Karnataka Parliamentary and Assembly map since 2008

India parliamentary election in Karnataka - Result (2009)

India parliamentary election in Karnataka - Schedule (2009)

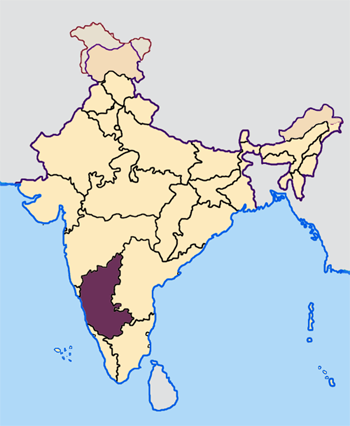
Karnataka in India

== Assembly Segment wise lead ==
| Party | Assembly segments | Position in Assembly (as of 2013 election) |
|---|---|---|
| Bharatiya Janata Party | 140 | 40 |
| Indian National Congress | 62 | 122 |
| Janata Dal (Secular) | 22 | 40 |
| Others | 0 | 22 |
| Total | 224 | |
