= C. P. Mudalagiriyappa =

Indian politician (1940–2024)

Member of Parliament, Lok Sabha from Chitradurga
- In office 1989–1996
- Preceded by: K. H. Ranganath
- Succeeded by: P. Kondandaramaiah
- In office 1998–1999
- Preceded by: P. Kondandaramaiah
- Succeeded by: Shashi Kumar

Member of Karnataka Legislative Assembly
- In office 1985–1989
- Preceded by: P. Mudlegowda
- Succeeded by: S. K. Dasappa
- Constituency: Sira

Personal details
- Born: 24 June 1940 Chirathahalli, Tumkur, Kingdom of Mysore
- Died: 23 March 2024 (aged 83) Bengaluru, Karnataka, India
- Party: Indian National Congress
- Other political affiliations: Bharatiya Janata Party
- Spouse: Lakshmi Devi (m. 1970)
- Children: 2, including C. M. Rajesh Gowda
- Education: B.A. and B.L.
- Alma mater: Bangalore University
- Profession: Agriculturist, lawyer, politician, social worker

Chirathahalli Papegowda Mudalagiriyappa (24 June 1940 – 23 March 2024) was an Indian politician and leader of Indian National Congress (INC) from Karnataka. He was a three-time Member of Parliament and represented Chitradurga in the Lok Sabha, the lower house of the Parliament of India. He was also a member of the parliamentary delegation led by the G. M. C. Balayogi to Iraq in 1998. His son C. M. Rajesh Gowda is a doctor and former legislator.

== Biography ==
Mudalagiriyappa was born on 24 June 1940 in Chirathahalli of Tumkur district, Karnataka. Papegowda was his father. Mudalagiriyappa completed his education in B.A. and B.L. at Government Law College and Bangalore University, Bangalore in Karnataka.

Mudalagiriyappa was elected as member of the Karnataka legislative assembly in his first attempt when he contested Sira in the 1985 election. He was then elected thrice from Chitradurga to the Lok Sabha, and served as a member of parliament between 1988 and 1999. In 1996, he lost to P. Kondandaramaiah of the Janata Dal and in 1999 to Shashi Kumar of the Janata Dal (Secular). In 2004, Mudalagiriyappa resigned from primary membership of the INC stating that the party had become the private enterprise of a few individuals. He unsuccessfully contested Chitradurga in the 2004 election on a Bharatiya Janata Party ticket, and lost to INC's N. Y. Hanumanthappa.

Mudalagiriyappa married Lakshmi Devi on 7 May 1970 and the couple had one son and one daughter. His son C. M. Rajesh Gowda is a doctor and former legislator. Mudalagiriyappa died on 23 March 2024, at the age of 83.

== Positions held ==
#	From	To	Position
1.	1979	1982	General Secretary of District Congress Committee (Indira) D.C.C.(I), Karnataka.
2.	1979	1989	Chairman of Legal Cell in Pradesh Congress Committee (Indira) P.C.C.(I), Karnataka.
3.	1980		Member of Constitution Amendment Committee in Karnataka Government.
4.	1985	1989	Member of Legislative Assembly from Sira constituency.: Member of Committee on subordinate legislation.; Member of the Estimates committee.; Member of Committee on Public undertakings.
5.	1989	1991	MP (1st term) in 9th Lok Sabha from Chitradurga.: Member of the Consultative Committee in the Ministry of Law and Justice.
6.	1991	1996	MP (2nd term) in 10th Lok Sabha from Chitradurga.: Member of the Estimates Committee.; Member of Committee on Petroleum and Chemicals.; Member of the Consultative Committee in the Ministry of Urban Development.
7.	1998	1999	MP (3rd term) in 12th Lok Sabha from Chitradurga.: Member of Committee on Food, Civil Supplies and Public Distribution and its Sub-Committee-A on Department of Food and Civil Supplies.; Member of Committee on Absence of Members from the Sittings of the House.; Member of the Consultative Committee in the Ministry of Labour.
