= Govindappa =

Govindappa is both a given name and a surname. Notable people with the name include:

- Govindappa Venkataswamy (1918–2006), Indian ophthalmologist
- B. G. Govindappa (born 1955), Indian politician
