= Holalkere Assembly constituency =

Legislative Assembly constituency in Karnataka State, India

Coordinates: 14.05°N 76.18°E

Holalkere
- Constituency No. 102 for the Karnataka Legislative Assembly

Constituency details
- Country: India
- Region: South India
- State: Karnataka
- District: Chitradurga
- Lok Sabha constituency: Chitradurga
- Established: 1961
- Total electors: 235,346
- Reservation: SC

Member of Legislative Assembly
- 16th Karnataka Legislative Assembly
- Incumbent M. Chandrappa
- Party: Bharatiya Janata Party
- Elected year: 2023
- Preceded by: H. Anjaneya

Holalkere Assembly constituency is one of the 224 Legislative Assembly constituencies of Karnataka in India.

It is part of Chitradurga district and is reserved for candidates belonging to the Scheduled Castes. M. Chandrappa is the current MLA of Holalkere.

== Members of the Legislative Assembly ==
Election	Member	Party
1952	G. Duggappa	Indian National Congress
1952	G. Sivappa	Indian National Congress
1962	G. Duggappa	Indian National Congress
1967	B. Parameswarappa	Swatantra Party
1972	B. Parameswarappa	Indian National Congress
1978	K. H. Siddarampna	Indian National Congress
1980 By-election	G. C. Manjunath	Janata Party
1983	G. Shivalingappa	Janata Party
1985	G. C. Manjunath	Janata Party
1989	A. V. Umapathy	Indian National Congress
1994	U. H. Thimmanna	Janata Dal
1999	P. Ramesh	Bharatiya Janata Party
2004	A. V. Umapathy	Indian National Congress
2008	M. Chandrappa	Bharatiya Janata Party
2013	H. Anjaneya	Indian National Congress
2018	M. Chandrappa	Bharatiya Janata Party
2023	M. Chandrappa	Bharatiya Janata Party

== Election results ==
=== Assembly Election 2023 ===
2023 Karnataka Legislative Assembly election : Holalkere
Party	Candidate	Votes	%	±%
BJP	M. Chandrappa	88,732	45.02	▼12.27
INC	H. Anjaneya	83,050	42.14	▲5.51
Independent	Dr. Jayasimha Lokanath	19,727	10.01	New
JD(S)	S. R. Indrajeet Naik	1,576	0.80	▼1.09
NOTA	None of the above	1,159	0.59	▲0.38
Margin of victory		5,682	2.88	▼17.78
Turnout		197,365	83.86	▼0.27
Total valid votes		197,079		
Registered electors		235,346		▲4.86
BJP hold		Swing	▼12.27	

=== Assembly Election 2018 ===
2018 Karnataka Legislative Assembly election : Holalkere
Party	Candidate	Votes	%	±%
BJP	M. Chandrappa	107,976	57.29	▲51.54
INC	H. Anjaneya	69,036	36.63	▼21.53
JD(S)	Srinivasa Gaddige. T	3,553	1.89	▼0.45
Independent	Hanumanthappa Durga	1,782	0.95	New
Independent	M. Hanumakka	1,402	0.74	New
NOTA	None of the above	398	0.21	New
Margin of victory		38,940	20.66	▲10.93
Turnout		188,830	84.13	▲4.35
Total valid votes		188,486		
Registered electors		224,444		▲9.77
BJP gain from INC		Swing	▼0.87	

=== Assembly Election 2013 ===
2013 Karnataka Legislative Assembly election : Holalkere
Party	Candidate	Votes	%	±%
INC	H. Anjaneya	76,856	47.16	
KJP	M. Chandrappa	63,992	39.26	New
BJP	Devendranaik. H. R	7,595	5.75	▼34.91
JD(S)	K. E. B. Mahadevappa	3,091	2.34	▼19.24
BSRCP	H. Srinivasa	2,912	2.20	New
Independent	Chandrappa	2,264	1.71	New
Independent	G. Shanthappa	1,591	1.20	New
ANC	T. Basavarajappa	1,194	0.90	New
Margin of victory		12,864	9.73	▼1.73
Turnout		163,129	79.78	▲13.09
Total valid votes		132,149		
Registered electors		204,469		▲1.96
INC gain from BJP		Swing	▲17.50	

=== Assembly Election 2008 ===
2008 Karnataka Legislative Assembly election : Holalkere
Party	Candidate	Votes	%	±%
BJP	M. Chandrappa	54,322	40.66	▲25.95
INC	H. Anjaneya	39,010	29.20	▼14.03
JD(S)	Devendranaik. H. R	28,838	21.58	▲20.66
Independent	T. Kariyanna	2,413	1.81	New
Independent	H. Ramachandrappa	2,277	1.70	New
BSP	D. R. Panduranga Swamy	2,079	1.56	▼5.70
Swarna Yuga Party	T. S. Chandrashekhar	1,456	1.09	New
SP	S. Ranga Swamy	1,106	0.83	New
Independent	V. Ramesh	864	0.65	New
Margin of victory		15,312	11.46	▼1.41
Turnout		133,738	66.69	▼7.79
Total valid votes		133,608		
Registered electors		200,543		▲33.89
BJP gain from INC		Swing	▼2.57	

=== Assembly Election 2004 ===
2004 Karnataka Legislative Assembly election : Holalkere
Party	Candidate	Votes	%	±%
INC	A. V. Umapathy	48,179	43.23	New
Independent	Manjunath. G. S	33,836	30.36	New
BJP	P. Ramesh	16,395	14.71	▼33.73
BSP	Anand. H. G	8,096	7.26	▲5.92
KRRS	Eichagattada Siddaveerappa	1,560	1.40	New
Independent	Jayappa. N	1,337	1.20	New
JD(S)	Shekharappa. G. B	1,023	0.92	▼2.28
Independent	Rameshappa. K	1,015	0.91	New
Margin of victory		14,343	12.87	▲11.46
Turnout		111,565	74.48	▼2.88
Total valid votes		111,441		
Registered electors		149,787		▲8.72
INC gain from BJP		Swing	▼5.21	

=== Assembly Election 1999 ===
1999 Karnataka Legislative Assembly election : Holalkere
Party	Candidate	Votes	%	±%
BJP	P. Ramesh	50,121	48.44	▲26.75
Independent	A. V. Umapathy	48,666	47.03	New
JD(S)	G. Ramappa	3,307	3.20	New
BSP	B. S. Rudrappa	1,383	1.34	▼0.04
Margin of victory		1,455	1.41	▲0.45
Turnout		106,590	77.36	▲6.13
Total valid votes		103,477		
Rejected ballots		2,959	2.78	▲0.83
Registered electors		137,777		▼1.03
BJP gain from JD		Swing	▲20.64	

=== Assembly Election 1994 ===
1994 Karnataka Legislative Assembly election : Holalkere
Party	Candidate	Votes	%	±%
JD	U. H. Thimmanna	27,026	27.80	▼11.47
Independent	A. V. Umapathy	26,090	26.83	New
BJP	P. Ramesh	21,091	21.69	New
INC	A. S. Ramachandrappa	13,207	13.58	▼41.04
INC	M. B. Thipperudrappa	4,373	4.50	New
KRRS	B. R. Nagarajappa	2,125	2.19	New
BSP	N. K. Krupakara	1,338	1.38	New
Independent	C. Suresh Kumar	766	0.79	New
Margin of victory		936	0.96	▼14.39
Turnout		99,156	71.23	▲0.85
Total valid votes		97,225		
Rejected ballots		1,931	1.95	▼1.61
Registered electors		139,205		▲12.24
JD gain from INC		Swing	▼26.82	

=== Assembly Election 1989 ===
1989 Karnataka Legislative Assembly election : Holalkere
Party	Candidate	Votes	%	±%
INC	A. V. Umapathy	45,978	54.62	▲12.62
JD	G. Shivalingappa	33,056	39.27	New
JP	Mallikarjunappa	3,198	3.80	New
Margin of victory		12,922	15.35	▲3.35
Turnout		87,286	70.38	▼4.77
Total valid votes		84,179		
Rejected ballots		3,107	3.56	▲2.11
Registered electors		124,022		▲23.49
INC gain from JP		Swing	▲0.62	

=== Assembly Election 1985 ===
1985 Karnataka Legislative Assembly election : Holalkere
Party	Candidate	Votes	%	±%
JP	G. C. Manjunath	40,165	54.00	▼1.36
INC	A. V. Umapathy	31,238	42.00	▲1.09
Independent	T. N. Rudrappa	1,143	1.54	New
Independent	K. R. Eshwara Naik	1,104	1.48	New
Independent	C. Radhamma	494	0.66	New
Margin of victory		8,927	12.00	▼2.46
Turnout		75,474	75.15	▲2.43
Total valid votes		74,382		
Rejected ballots		1,092	1.45	▼0.36
Registered electors		100,429		▲10.12
JP hold		Swing	▼1.36	

=== Assembly Election 1983 ===
1983 Karnataka Legislative Assembly election : Holalkere
Party	Candidate	Votes	%	±%
JP	G. Shivalingappa	36,050	55.36	▼39.67
INC	M. B. Thipperudrappa	26,637	40.91	New
Independent	B. S. Thippeswamy	1,061	1.63	New
Independent	Mujeebullah Khan	505	0.78	New
Margin of victory		9,413	14.46	▼78.60
Turnout		66,318	72.72	
Total valid votes		65,119		
Rejected ballots		1,199	1.81	
Registered electors		91,202		
JP hold		Swing	▼39.67	

=== Assembly By-election 1980 ===
1980 Karnataka Legislative Assembly by-election : Holalkere
Party	Candidate	Votes	%	±%
JP	G. C. Manjunath	19,588	95.03	▲65.34
Independent	K. H. Rudramani	405	1.96	New
Independent	N. Reddy	364	1.77	New
Independent	D. H. S. Rao	256	1.24	New
Margin of victory		19,183	93.06	▲91.97
Total valid votes		20,613		
JP gain from INC(I)		Swing	▲61.49	

=== Assembly Election 1978 ===
1978 Karnataka Legislative Assembly election : Holalkere
Party	Candidate	Votes	%	±%
INC(I)	K. H. Siddarampna	20,573	33.54	New
INC	M. B. Thipperudrappa	19,904	32.45	▼25.39
JP	B. Parameswarappa	18,214	29.69	New
Independent	Mujeebullah Khan	2,653	4.32	New
Margin of victory		669	1.09	▼14.59
Turnout		62,902	77.72	▲6.02
Total valid votes		61,344		
Rejected ballots		1,558	2.48	▲2.48
Registered electors		80,934		▲10.92
INC(I) gain from INC		Swing	▼24.30	

=== Assembly Election 1972 ===
1972 Mysore State Legislative Assembly election : Holalkere
Party	Candidate	Votes	%	±%
INC	B. Parameswarappa	29,587	57.84	▲31.79
INC(O)	M. B. Thipperudrappa	21,566	42.16	New
Margin of victory		8,021	15.68	▼2.73
Turnout		52,315	71.70	▼0.14
Total valid votes		51,153		
Registered electors		72,966		▲20.57
INC gain from SWA		Swing	▲13.38	

=== Assembly Election 1967 ===
1967 Mysore State Legislative Assembly election : Holalkere
Party	Candidate	Votes	%	±%
SWA	B. Parameswarappa	18,261	44.46	New
INC	G. Sivappa	10,701	26.05	▼35.36
Independent	C. Malesiddappa	6,936	16.89	New
Independent	K. H. S. K. Belappa	4,487	10.92	New
Independent	T. R. Rangappa	686	1.67	New
Margin of victory		7,560	18.41	▼10.28
Turnout		43,477	71.84	▲16.72
Total valid votes		41,071		
Registered electors		60,517		▲11.47
SWA gain from INC		Swing	▼16.95	

=== Assembly Election 1962 ===
1962 Mysore State Legislative Assembly election : Holalkere
Party	Candidate	Votes	%	±%
INC	G. Duggappa	16,752	61.41	▲12.22
Independent	B. Rangappa	8,926	32.72	New
Independent	D. N. Mallappa	837	3.07	New
Independent	A. T. Thimmapa	766	2.81	New
Margin of victory		7,826	28.69	▲14.82
Turnout		29,925	55.12	▼56.44
Total valid votes		27,281		
Registered electors		54,292		▼33.33
INC hold		Swing	▲34.97	

=== Assembly Election 1952 ===
1952 Mysore State Legislative Assembly election : Holalkere
Party	Candidate	Votes	%	±%
INC	G. Duggappa	24,024	26.44	New
INC	G. Sivappa	20,671	22.75	New
Independent	M. Hanumanthappa	11,425	12.58	New
Independent	C. Malesiddappa	10,478	11.53	New
Socialist	S. Hanumanthappa	9,408	10.36	New
KMPP	D. Malliah	4,477	4.93	New
Independent	B. V. Sivallingappa	3,230	3.56	New
Independent	K. Sakre Naik	2,551	2.81	New
SCF	Kanchappa	2,123	2.34	New
Margin of victory		12,599	13.87	
Turnout		90,853	55.78	
Total valid votes		90,853		
Registered electors		81,439		
INC win (new seat)				

== See also ==
- List of constituencies of the Karnataka Legislative Assembly
- Chitradurga district
