= Hosadurga Assembly constituency =

Legislative Assembly constituency in Karnataka State, India

Coordinates: 13.8°N 76.28°E

Hosadurga
- Constituency No. 101 for the Karnataka Legislative Assembly

Constituency details
- Country: India
- Region: South India
- State: Karnataka
- District: Chitradurga
- Lok Sabha constituency: Chitradurga
- Established: 1951
- Total electors: 197,693
- Reservation: None

Member of Legislative Assembly
- 16th Karnataka Legislative Assembly
- Incumbent B. G. Govindappa
- Party: Indian National Congress
- Elected year: 2023
- Preceded by: Goolihatti. D. Shekar

Hosadurga Assembly constituency is one of the 224 Legislative Assembly constituencies of Karnataka in India. It is part of Chitradurga district.

== Members of the Legislative Assembly ==
Election	Member	Party
1952	G. Basappa	Indian National Congress
1957	B. S. Shankarappa	Independent politician
1962	G. T. Rangappa	Praja Socialist Party
1967	M. Ramappa	Indian National Congress
1972	M. V. Rudrappa	Indian National Congress
1978	K. Venkataramaiah	Indian National Congress
1982 By-election	M. V. Rudrappa	Indian National Congress
1983	G. Basappa	Janata Party
1985	G. Ramdas	Indian National Congress
1989	E. Vijayakumar	Independent politician
1994	T. H. Basavaraja	Independent politician
1999	B. G. Govindappa	Independent politician
2004	B. G. Govindappa	Indian National Congress
2008	Gulihatti D. Shekar	Independent politician
2013	B. G. Govindappa	Indian National Congress
2018	Gulihatti D. Shekar	Bharatiya Janata Party
2023	B. G. Govindappa	Indian National Congress

== Election results ==
=== Assembly Election 2023 ===
2023 Karnataka Legislative Assembly election : Hosadurga
Party	Candidate	Votes	%	±%
INC	B. G. Govindappa	81,050	48.36%	▲7.96
BJP	S. Lingamurthy	48,234	28.78%	▼27.88
Independent	T. Manjunath	20,812	12.42%	New
Independent	Gulihatti D. Shekar	10,449	6.24%	New
JD(S)	Thippeswamy. M	1,914	1.14%	▲0.15
Independent	D. Panduranga Garag	1,835	1.09%	New
NOTA	None of the above	1,030	0.61%	▼0.22
Margin of victory		32,816	19.58%	▲3.32
Turnout		167,787	84.87%	▼0.58
Total valid votes		167,580		
Registered electors		197,693		▲5.64
INC gain from BJP		Swing	▼8.30	

=== Assembly Election 2018 ===
2018 Karnataka Legislative Assembly election : Hosadurga
Party	Candidate	Votes	%	±%
BJP	Gulihatti D. Shekar	90,562	56.66%	▲55.52
INC	B. G. Govindappa	64,570	40.40%	▲4.81
JD(S)	Shashikumar	1,575	0.99%	New
NOTA	None of the above	1,326	0.83%	New
Margin of victory		25,992	16.26%	▲3.98
Turnout		159,910	85.45%	▲5.51
Total valid votes		159,846		
Registered electors		187,137		▲6.70
BJP gain from INC		Swing	▲21.07	

=== Assembly Election 2013 ===
2013 Karnataka Legislative Assembly election : Hosadurga
Party	Candidate	Votes	%	±%
INC	B. G. Govindappa	58,010	35.59%	▲2.62
Independent	Gulihatti D. Shekar	37,993	23.31%	New
KJP	S. Lingamurthy	37,717	23.14%	New
BJP	M. Lakshmana	1,866	1.14%	▼26.10
Independent	K. Shivanna	1,190	0.73%	New
Margin of victory		20,017	12.28%	▲11.33
Turnout		140,205	79.94%	▲6.51
Total valid votes		162,979		
Registered electors		175,379		▲4.39
INC gain from Independent		Swing	▲1.67	

=== Assembly Election 2008 ===
2008 Karnataka Legislative Assembly election : Hosadurga
Party	Candidate	Votes	%	±%
Independent	Gulihatti D. Shekar	41,798	33.92%	New
INC	B. G. Govindappa	40,630	32.97%	▼8.76
BJP	S. Lingamurthy	33,565	27.24%	▲8.20
JD(S)	C. Meenakshamma Nandeesh	3,806	3.09%	▼21.26
Independent	H. S. Shreedhar	885	0.72%	New
BSP	D. Mohankumar Yadav	776	0.63%	New
Margin of victory		1,168	0.95%	▼16.42
Turnout		123,357	73.43%	▲0.70
Total valid votes		123,237		
Registered electors		168,004		▲2.23
Independent gain from INC		Swing	▼7.81	

=== Assembly Election 2004 ===
2004 Karnataka Legislative Assembly election : Hosadurga
Party	Candidate	Votes	%	±%
INC	B. G. Govindappa	49,780	41.73%	▲36.50
JD(S)	Elkal Vijaya Kumar	29,052	24.35%	▲22.28
BJP	Guruswamy. D	22,715	19.04%	New
JD(U)	Mallikarjuna. H. C	14,600	12.24%	▼3.76
Kannada Nadu Party	Prakash. B. O	1,388	1.16%	New
Independent	Bheemaraya Shetty. S. R	982	0.82%	New
Independent	Thippeshappa. L. M	783	0.66%	New
Margin of victory		20,728	17.37%	▲16.25
Turnout		119,529	72.73%	▼4.87
Total valid votes		119,300		
Registered electors		164,339		▲9.94
INC gain from Independent		Swing	▲17.64	

=== Assembly Election 1999 ===
1999 Karnataka Legislative Assembly election : Hosadurga
Party	Candidate	Votes	%	±%
Independent	B. G. Govindappa	26,372	24.09%	New
Independent	Elkal Vijaya Kumar	25,145	22.97%	New
JD(U)	T. H. Basavaraja	17,517	16.00%	New
Independent	M. P. Kambesh	14,367	13.12%	New
Independent	Mallikarjuna. H. C	9,136	8.34%	New
Independent	H. D. Pandurangappa	8,956	8.18%	New
INC	Umadevi	5,721	5.23%	▼15.40
JD(S)	H. P. Jagadish	2,271	2.07%	New
Margin of victory		1,227	1.12%	▼3.77
Turnout		116,004	77.60%	▲3.75
Total valid votes		109,485		
Rejected ballots		6,425	5.54%	▲3.72
Registered electors		149,482		▲4.57
Independent hold		Swing	▼1.43	

=== Assembly Election 1994 ===
1994 Karnataka Legislative Assembly election : Hosadurga
Party	Candidate	Votes	%	±%
Independent	T. H. Basavaraja	26,453	25.52%	New
INC	E. V. Vijay Kumar	21,384	20.63%	▲4.56
INC	H. D. Pandurangappa	18,669	18.01%	New
JD	M. Sanna Chikkanna	17,073	16.47%	▲5.36
BJP	H. R. Kallesh	11,834	11.42%	▲10.05
BSP	Garagada Basappa	5,701	5.50%	New
Independent	Abdul Rasheed	765	0.74%	New
Margin of victory		5,069	4.89%	▼19.94
Turnout		105,567	73.85%	▼2.63
Total valid votes		103,649		
Rejected ballots		1,918	1.82%	▼5.22
Registered electors		142,952		▲9.29
Independent hold		Swing	▼19.32	

=== Assembly Election 1989 ===
1989 Karnataka Legislative Assembly election : Hosadurga
Party	Candidate	Votes	%	±%
Independent	E. Vijayakumar	41,703	44.84%	New
Independent	B. S. Dyamappa	18,615	20.02%	New
INC	G. Ramdas	14,940	16.07%	▼32.14
JD	K. Mallappa	10,333	11.11%	New
JP	G. R. Manjunatha	3,755	4.04%	New
CPI	R. Sadashivappa	1,572	1.69%	New
BJP	H. B. Chidanandappa	1,270	1.37%	New
Margin of victory		23,088	24.83%	▲24.53
Turnout		100,040	76.48%	▲1.54
Total valid votes		92,996		
Rejected ballots		7,044	7.04%	▲5.67
Registered electors		130,798		▲24.09
Independent gain from INC		Swing	▼3.37	

=== Assembly Election 1985 ===
1985 Karnataka Legislative Assembly election : Hosadurga
Party	Candidate	Votes	%	±%
INC	G. Ramdas	37,562	48.21%	▲8.27
JP	M. Sanna Chikkanna	37,328	47.91%	▼9.15
Independent	Bharmappa	1,255	1.61%	New
Independent	Kishkindapuri Swamiji	790	1.01%	New
Independent	Thimmappa	506	0.65%	New
Independent	G. N. Honnappa	472	0.61%	New
Margin of victory		234	0.30%	▼16.82
Turnout		78,997	74.94%	▼0.21
Total valid votes		77,913		
Rejected ballots		1,084	1.37%	▼0.14
Registered electors		105,409		▲11.63
INC gain from JP		Swing	▼8.85	

=== Assembly Election 1983 ===
1983 Karnataka Legislative Assembly election : Hosadurga
Party	Candidate	Votes	%	±%
JP	G. Basappa	39,877	57.06%	▲23.62
INC	M. V. Rudrappa	27,913	39.94%	▼2.08
Independent	R. Nagappa	831	1.19%	New
Independent	Hottepaksha Rangaswamy	619	0.89%	New
Margin of victory		11,964	17.12%	▲8.55
Turnout		70,960	75.15%	
Total valid votes		69,885		
Rejected ballots		1,075	1.51%	
Registered electors		94,424		
JP gain from INC		Swing	▲15.04	

=== Assembly By-election 1982 ===
1982 Karnataka Legislative Assembly by-election : Hosadurga
Party	Candidate	Votes	%	±%
INC	M. V. Rudrappa	25,448	42.02%	▲19.69
JP	G. Basappa	20,256	33.44%	▲13.37
BJP	N. Gupta. R. A	5,348	8.83%	New
Independent	Kesavanna	4,699	7.76%	New
Independent	R. G. S. R. Puri	3,480	5.75%	New
Independent	Govindappa. H	455	0.75%	New
Margin of victory		5,192	8.57%	▼20.43
Total valid votes		60,568		
INC gain from INC(I)		Swing	▼9.31	

=== Assembly Election 1978 ===
1978 Karnataka Legislative Assembly election : Hosadurga
Party	Candidate	Votes	%	±%
INC(I)	K. Venkataramaiah	30,539	51.33%	New
INC	K. R. Shivaprakash	13,285	22.33%	▼41.03
JP	Channaiah Odeyar	11,943	20.07%	New
Independent	Tapalappa	2,755	4.63%	New
Independent	Sivalingappa	970	1.63%	New
Margin of victory		17,254	29.00%	▲2.27
Turnout		61,086	72.87%	▲6.47
Total valid votes		59,492		
Rejected ballots		1,594	2.61%	▲2.61
Registered electors		83,832		▲9.96
INC(I) gain from INC		Swing	▼12.03	

=== Assembly Election 1972 ===
1972 Mysore State Legislative Assembly election : Hosadurga
Party	Candidate	Votes	%	±%
INC	M. V. Rudrappa	31,375	63.36%	▲7.88
INC(O)	G. Basappa	18,141	36.64%	New
Margin of victory		13,234	26.73%	▲15.77
Turnout		50,621	66.40%	▼0.41
Total valid votes		49,516		
Registered electors		76,242		▲22.01
INC hold		Swing	▲7.88	

=== Assembly Election 1967 ===
1967 Mysore State Legislative Assembly election : Hosadurga
Party	Candidate	Votes	%	±%
INC	M. Ramappa	22,157	55.48%	▲12.93
PSP	M. V. Rudrappa	17,781	44.52%	▼12.93
Margin of victory		4,376	10.96%	▼3.93
Turnout		41,745	66.81%	▼6.83
Total valid votes		39,938		
Registered electors		62,486		▲15.61
INC gain from PSP		Swing	▼1.97	

=== Assembly Election 1962 ===
1962 Mysore State Legislative Assembly election : Hosadurga
Party	Candidate	Votes	%	±%
PSP	G. T. Rangappa	22,024	57.45%	▲44.79
INC	S. Nijalingappa	16,315	42.55%	▲11.75
Margin of victory		5,709	14.89%	▼2.26
Turnout		39,803	73.64%	▲16.46
Total valid votes		38,339		
Registered electors		54,048		▲16.46
PSP gain from Independent		Swing	▲9.49	

=== Assembly Election 1957 ===
1957 Mysore State Legislative Assembly election : Hosadurga
Party	Candidate	Votes	%	±%
Independent	B. S. Shankarappa	12,727	47.96%	New
INC	Gangamma	8,175	30.80%	▼17.47
PSP	A. V. Bhadran	3,360	12.66%	New
Independent	G. Ramdas	2,277	8.58%	New
Margin of victory		4,552	17.15%	▲0.67
Turnout		26,539	57.18%	▼2.46
Total valid votes		26,539		
Registered electors		46,411		▲15.66
Independent gain from INC		Swing	▼0.31	

=== Assembly Election 1952 ===
1952 Mysore State Legislative Assembly election : Hosadurga
Party	Candidate	Votes	%	±%
INC	G. Basappa	11,552	48.27%	New
Independent	Channaiah Odeyar	7,608	31.79%	New
Socialist Party (India)	B. S. Shankarappa	3,365	14.06%	New
SCF	Rayappa	1,408	5.88%	New
Margin of victory		3,944	16.48%	
Turnout		23,933	59.64%	
Total valid votes		23,933		
Registered electors		40,126		
INC win (new seat)				

== See also ==
- List of constituencies of the Karnataka Legislative Assembly
- Chitradurga district
