= C. M. Rajesh Gowda =

Member of the Karnataka Legislative Assembly

Dr. Rajesh Gowda C M

Member of the Karnataka Legislative Assembly
- In office 10 November 2020 – 13 May 2023
- Preceded by: B. Satyanarayana
- Succeeded by: T.B Jayachandra
- Constituency: Sira

Personal details
- Born: C.M. Rajesh Gowda; 1973 (age 52–53) Tumkur, Karnataka, India
- Party: Bharatiya Janata party
- Spouse: Dr Thejaswini M U
- Parent: C. P. Mudalagiriyappa
- Education: M.B.B.S, [DMRD (Radio Diagnosis) 2005 from A.I.M.S.B.G. Nagar (R.G.U.H.S.)]
- Profession: Radiologist

C.M. Rajesh Gowda is an Indian radiologist and politician. He is a Member of the Karnataka Legislative Assembly from Sira. He belongs to the Bharatiya Janata Party and is one of the youngest MLAs in Karnataka as of 2020.

His father, C. P. Mudalagiriyappa was a three-time Congress MP. As a medical professional, Dr Rajesh Gowda focussed on his medical practice. His service of patients endeared him to people, who encouraged him to enter public life. He contested the 2020 bypoll election from Sira and won, becoming the first BJP candidate to win the constituency.

Dr Rajesh Gowda along with congress leader Yathindra Siddaramaiah founded Matrix Imaging Solutions. However Dr Yathindra resigned as a director following a controversy in 2016.
