= Chitradurga Assembly constituency =

Seat in the Karnataka Legislative Assembly

Coordinates: 14.23°N 76.40°E

Chitradurga
- Constituency No. 99 for the Karnataka Legislative Assembly

Constituency details
- Country: India
- Region: South India
- State: Karnataka
- District: Chitradurga
- Lok Sabha constituency: Chitradurga
- Established: 1951
- Total electors: 262,552
- Reservation: None

Member of Legislative Assembly
- 16th Karnataka Legislative Assembly
- Incumbent K. C. Veerendra
- Party: Indian National Congress
- Elected year: 2023
- Preceded by: G. H. Thippareddy

Chitradurga Assembly constituency is one of the seats in Karnataka Legislative Assembly in India. It is part of Chitradurga Lok Sabha constituency.

K. C. Veerendra Puppy is the current MLA from Chitradurga.

== Members of the Legislative Assembly ==
Election	Member	Party
1952	Mulka Govinda Reddy	Socialist Party
1957	G. Sivappa	Indian National Congress
1957	G. Duggappa	Indian National Congress
1962	H. C. Boraiah	Indian National Congress
1967	H. C. Boraiah	Indian National Congress
1972	C. R. Mohammad Saifuddin	Indian National Congress
1978	V. Masiyappa	Indian National Congress
1983	B. L. Gowda	Janata Party
1985	H. Ekanthaiah	Janata Party
1989	H. Ekanthaiah	Janata Dal
1994	G. H. Thippareddy	Independent politician
1999	G. H. Thippareddy	Independent politician
2004	G. H. Thippareddy	Indian National Congress
2008	Basavarajan Basanna	Janata Dal
2013	G. H. Thippareddy	Bharatiya Janata Party
2018	G. H. Thippareddy	Bharatiya Janata Party
2023	K. C. Veerendra Puppy	Indian National Congress

== Election results ==
=== Assembly Election 2023 ===
2023 Karnataka Legislative Assembly election : Chitradurga
Party	Candidate	Votes	%	±%
INC	K. C. Veerendra Puppy	122,021	59.84%	▲33.96
BJP	G. H. Thippareddy	68,721	33.70%	▼10.08
JD(S)	G. Raghu Achar	5,021	2.46%	▼23.90
SDPI	Bale Kai Srinivasa. H	2,555	1.25%	New
AAP	B. E. Jagadish	1,348	0.66%	New
NOTA	None of the above	695	0.34%	▼0.41
Margin of victory		53,300	26.14%	▲8.72
Turnout		204,674	77.96%	▲2.44
Total valid votes		203,906		
Registered electors		262,552		▲4.60
INC gain from BJP		Swing	▲16.06	

=== Assembly Election 2018 ===
2018 Karnataka Legislative Assembly election : Chitradurga
Party	Candidate	Votes	%	±%
BJP	G. H. Thippareddy	82,896	43.78%	▲4.98
JD(S)	K. C. Veerendra Puppy	49,911	26.36%	▲4.22
INC	H. A. Shanmukhappa (Hanumali)	49,014	25.88%	▲6.72
NOTA	None of the above	1,427	0.75%	New
Independent	N. Suresh	1,287	0.68%	New
Margin of victory		32,985	17.42%	▲0.76
Turnout		189,557	75.52%	▲2.90
Total valid votes		189,358		
Registered electors		251,003		▲11.41
BJP hold		Swing	▲4.98	

=== Assembly Election 2013 ===
2013 Karnataka Legislative Assembly election : Chitradurga
Party	Candidate	Votes	%	±%
BJP	G. H. Thippareddy	62,228	38.80%	▲11.59
JD(S)	Basavarajan Basanna	35,510	22.14%	▼18.35
INC	G. S. Manjunatha	30,729	19.16%	▼9.51
BSRCP	Fayazuddin. K. S	23,382	14.58%	New
KJP	A. V. Umapathi	3,791	2.36%	New
Independent	Sathish	1,993	1.24%	New
Independent	C. K. Rehaman @ Chand	1,077	0.67%	New
Margin of victory		26,718	16.66%	▲4.84
Turnout		163,616	72.62%	▲5.84
Total valid votes		160,397		
Registered electors		225,294		▲8.83
BJP gain from JD(S)		Swing	▼1.69	

=== Assembly Election 2008 ===
2008 Karnataka Legislative Assembly election : Chitradurga
Party	Candidate	Votes	%	±%
JD(S)	Basavarajan Basanna	55,906	40.49%	▼3.01
INC	G. H. Thippareddy	39,584	28.67%	▼16.49
BJP	G. S. Manjunatha	37,571	27.21%	▲20.49
Independent	S. M. Sadanandaiah	1,376	1.00%	New
BSP	Mohamed Nasiruddin. T. R	1,088	0.79%	▼1.73
Swarna Yuga Party	S. Sridevi Krishanamurthy	870	0.63%	New
Independent	Kotla Ramalingareddy	830	0.60%	New
Margin of victory		16,322	11.82%	▲10.16
Turnout		138,244	66.78%	▲0.77
Total valid votes		138,077		
Registered electors		207,006		▲15.25
JD(S) gain from INC		Swing	▼4.67	

=== Assembly Election 2004 ===
2004 Karnataka Legislative Assembly election : Chitradurga
Party	Candidate	Votes	%	±%
INC	G. H. Thippareddy	53,386	45.16%	▲24.93
JD(S)	Basavarajan. S. K	51,420	43.50%	▲42.72
BJP	Shivanna. G. H	7,949	6.72%	▲0.83
BSP	Kumar. K	2,978	2.52%	New
Independent	Thippaiah Reddy. B. H	876	0.74%	New
Margin of victory		1,966	1.66%	▼23.60
Turnout		118,566	66.01%	▼3.82
Total valid votes		118,210		
Registered electors		179,607		▲12.17
INC gain from Independent		Swing	▼3.80	

=== Assembly Election 1999 ===
1999 Karnataka Legislative Assembly election : Chitradurga
Party	Candidate	Votes	%	±%
Independent	G. H. Thippareddy	51,198	48.96%	New
Independent	H. Ekanthaiah	24,782	23.70%	New
INC	M. K. Tajpeer	21,161	20.23%	▲1.43
BJP	R. Basavarajappa	6,164	5.89%	▲3.20
JD(S)	D. Yaraiah	814	0.78%	New
Margin of victory		26,416	25.26%	▲16.90
Turnout		111,808	69.83%	▲4.66
Total valid votes		104,577		
Rejected ballots		6,879	6.15%	▲4.14
Registered electors		160,115		▲4.46
Independent hold		Swing	▲9.80	

=== Assembly Election 1994 ===
1994 Karnataka Legislative Assembly election : Chitradurga
Party	Candidate	Votes	%	±%
Independent	G. H. Thippareddy	38,332	39.16%	New
JD	H. Ekanthaiah	30,149	30.80%	▼7.73
INC	C. M. Noorullasharief	18,400	18.80%	▼18.99
SP	S. Siddappa	3,297	3.37%	New
INC	S. T. Vasudeva Reddy	2,754	2.81%	New
BJP	Murugharajendra Wadeyar	2,629	2.69%	▲0.35
BSP	Shaik Mohammed	1,493	1.53%	New
Margin of victory		8,183	8.36%	▲7.62
Turnout		99,891	65.17%	▲3.06
Total valid votes		97,880		
Rejected ballots		2,011	2.01%	▼4.64
Registered electors		153,285		▲7.25
Independent gain from JD		Swing	▲0.63	

=== Assembly Election 1989 ===
1989 Karnataka Legislative Assembly election : Chitradurga
Party	Candidate	Votes	%	±%
JD	H. Ekanthaiah	31,923	38.53%	New
INC	C. M. Noorullasharief	31,313	37.79%	▼2.64
JP	B. L. G. Dayananda	10,570	12.76%	New
CPI	G. Chandrappa	5,715	6.90%	New
BJP	M. Raghavendra	1,936	2.34%	New
Independent	B. Manjunathachar	627	0.76%	New
Margin of victory		610	0.74%	▼14.55
Turnout		88,763	62.11%	▼5.62
Total valid votes		82,856		
Rejected ballots		5,907	6.65%	▲5.12
Registered electors		142,924		▲32.13
JD gain from JP		Swing	▼17.19	

=== Assembly Election 1985 ===
1985 Karnataka Legislative Assembly election : Chitradurga
Party	Candidate	Votes	%	±%
JP	H. Ekanthaiah	40,196	55.72%	▼0.68
INC	T. M. Khader Basha	29,166	40.43%	▲10.98
Independent	Ramanna	939	1.30%	New
Margin of victory		11,030	15.29%	▼11.66
Turnout		73,262	67.73%	▲1.72
Total valid votes		72,140		
Rejected ballots		1,122	1.53%	▼0.56
Registered electors		108,167		▲17.57
JP hold		Swing	▼0.68	

=== Assembly Election 1983 ===
1983 Karnataka Legislative Assembly election : Chitradurga
Party	Candidate	Votes	%	±%
JP	B. L. Gowda	33,536	56.40%	▲18.38
INC	V. Masiyappa	17,513	29.45%	▲27.11
Independent	Shaik Mohammed	6,958	11.70%	New
Independent	S. L. Thyagaraja	588	0.99%	New
BJP	E. H. Vasudeva Reddy	543	0.91%	New
Margin of victory		16,023	26.95%	▲7.47
Turnout		60,734	66.01%	▲3.68
Total valid votes		59,464		
Rejected ballots		1,270	2.09%	▼0.27
Registered electors		92,004		▼1.54
JP gain from INC(I)		Swing	▼1.09	

=== Assembly Election 1978 ===
1978 Karnataka Legislative Assembly election : Chitradurga
Party	Candidate	Votes	%	±%
INC(I)	V. Masiyappa	32,697	57.49%	New
JP	C. Abdul Rahim	21,621	38.02%	New
INC	A. G. Veeranna	1,333	2.34%	▼55.76
Independent	L. J. Umadeva	704	1.24%	New
Independent	K. Channabassappa	516	0.91%	New
Margin of victory		11,076	19.48%	▼14.27
Turnout		58,243	62.33%	▲5.22
Total valid votes		56,871		
Rejected ballots		1,372	2.36%	▲2.36
Registered electors		93,446		▲31.08
INC(I) gain from INC		Swing	▼0.61	

=== Assembly Election 1972 ===
1972 Mysore State Legislative Assembly election : Chitradurga
Party	Candidate	Votes	%	±%
INC	C. R. Mohammad Saifuddin	23,057	58.10%	▲1.05
INC(O)	T. M. K. Peer Sab	9,665	24.36%	New
ABJS	H. K. Vasudeva Reddy	6,960	17.54%	New
Margin of victory		13,392	33.75%	▲17.20
Turnout		40,711	57.11%	▼14.78
Total valid votes		39,682		
Registered electors		71,291		▲16.15
INC hold		Swing	▲1.05	

=== Assembly Election 1967 ===
1967 Mysore State Legislative Assembly election : Chitradurga
Party	Candidate	Votes	%	±%
INC	H. C. Boraiah	23,906	57.05%	▲0.38
PSP	V. T. R. Reddy	16,970	40.50%	▼2.83
Independent	T. A. Reddy	1,030	2.46%	New
Margin of victory		6,936	16.55%	▲3.22
Turnout		44,127	71.89%	▲9.74
Total valid votes		41,906		
Registered electors		61,380		▲3.24
INC hold		Swing	▲0.38	

=== Assembly Election 1962 ===
1962 Mysore State Legislative Assembly election : Chitradurga
Party	Candidate	Votes	%	±%
INC	H. C. Boraiah	19,897	56.67%	▼2.01
PSP	M. Gangadharaiah	15,215	43.33%	New
Margin of victory		4,682	13.33%	▲3.52
Turnout		36,948	62.15%	▲16.11
Total valid votes		35,112		
Registered electors		59,453		▼41.88
INC hold		Swing	▲24.14	

=== Assembly Election 1957 ===
1957 Mysore State Legislative Assembly election : Chitradurga
Party	Candidate	Votes	%	±%
INC	G. Sivappa	30,638	32.53%	▼8.11
INC	G. Duggappa	24,640	26.16%	▼14.48
Independent	C. Maleshiddappa	21,394	22.71%	New
Independent	D. N. Mallappa	10,768	11.43%	New
Independent	B. V. Sivalingappa	6,755	7.17%	New
Margin of victory		9,244	9.81%	▲7.33
Turnout		94,195	46.04%	▼12.35
Total valid votes		94,195		
Registered electors		102,300		▲124.02
INC gain from Socialist Party (India)		Swing	▼10.59	

=== Assembly Election 1952 ===
1952 Mysore State Legislative Assembly election : Chitradurga
Party	Candidate	Votes	%	±%
Socialist Party (India)	Mulka Govinda Reddy	11,498	43.12%	New
INC	S. Ranga Rao	10,836	40.64%	New
KMPP	O. Veerabasappa	4,330	16.24%	New
Margin of victory		662	2.48%	
Turnout		26,664	58.39%	
Total valid votes		26,664		
Registered electors		45,666		
Socialist Party (India) win (new seat)				

== See also ==
- List of constituencies of Karnataka Legislative Assembly
