= J. Mohammed Imam =

Indian politician (1897–1983)

Member of Parliament in 2nd Lok Sabha
- In office 5 April 1957 – 31 March 1962
- Constituency: Chitradurga Lok Sabha constituency

Member of Parliament in 4th Lok Sabha
- In office 4 March 1967 – 27 December 1970
- Constituency: Chitradurga Lok Sabha constituency

Personal details
- Born: 15 February 1897 Jagalur, Karnataka, India
- Died: 3 January 1983 (aged 85)
- Party: Swatantra Party (Joined 1959).
- Other political affiliations: Praja Socialist Party (1953-1959). Kisan Mazdoor Praja Party (1947-1953).
- Spouse: Chamanbi Imam (1921)
- Children: 1 son and 4 daughters
- Parent: J. Bade Saheb (father)
- Education: B.A., B.L. Central College; Madras Law College

J. Mohammed Imam (15 February 1897, Jagalur – 3 January 1983) was an Indian politician and 2 time Member of Parliament (MP), represented the Chitradurga constituency in Lok Sabha, the lower house of the Indian Parliament.

== Early life and background ==
Imam was born on 15 February 1897 in Jagalur, Karnataka and J. Bade Saheb was his father. He completed his education from Central College, Bangalore and Madras Law College. University of Madras. He obtained Bachelor of Arts and Bachelor of Law degrees.

== Personal life ==
Imam married Chamanbi Imam in 1921. The couple has 1 son and 4 daughters.

== Political career ==
In 1928 he was elected to the senate of the Mysore University. In 1930 he became a member of the legislature (later Legislative Assembly) of the Mysore state. He would continue to be a Mysore legislator until 1957. Politically, he was a member of the All India Muslim League. Between 1933 and 1936 he served as the first non-official president of the Jagalur Municipal Council. He was the president of the Chitaldrug District Board between 1936 and 1940. He also held various posts in different companies.

He served as Minister for Education, Railways and Public Works Departments in the government of the Mysore State between June 1941 – 1945. In 1945 the Maharaja of Mysore named him 'Mushir ul-Mulk' ('Advisor of the Kingdom'). In 1947 he left the Muslim League. After the independence of India, he became a member of the Kisan Mazdoor Praja Party (which later, to J. Mohammed Imam's disappointment, merged into the Praja Socialist Party). He served as Leader of the Opposition in the Mysore Legislative Assembly from 1948 onwards. Key political themes of J. Mohammed Imam were secularism and anti-communism.

J. Mohammed Imam was elected to the Lok Sabha (lower house of the parliament of India) in the 1957 general election. He stood as the PSP candidate in Chitaldrug constituency, obtaining 129,848 votes (52.25% of the votes in the constituency). In the Second Lok Sabha he was a member of the Panel of Chairmen. In 1959 he joined the Swatantra Party.

In the 1962 Indian general election, he contested the Bellary Lok Sabha seat as a Swatantra Party candidate. He finished in second place with 137,448 votes (48.02%). He regained the Chitaldrug (now renamed Chitradruga) seat in the 1967 Indian general election, obtaining 164,548 votes (50.45%).

He lost the Chitradruga seat in the 1971 Indian general election. He finished in second place with 81,303 votes (24.16%).

== Positions held ==
#	From	To	Position
1.	1928	1940	Member of University Council and Senate (1st term).
2.	1933	1948	Member of Mysore Legislative Council.
3.	1936	1940	President of District Board Chitradurga District.
4.	1941	1945	Minister for Education Railways and Public Works Government of Mysore. (1941–1945)
5.	1946	1951	Member of University Council and Senate (2nd term)
6.	1952	1957	Member of Mysore Legislative Assembly.: Leader of the Opposition.
7.	1957	1962	MP (1st term) in 2nd Lok Sabha from Chitradurga.: Member of the Panel of Chairmen in Lok Sabha.
8.	1967	1970	MP (nd term) in 4th Lok Sabha from Chitradurga.
