= Sira Assembly constituency =

Legislative Assembly constituency in Karnataka, India

Coordinates: 13.75°N 76.90°E

Sira
- Constituency No. 136 for the Karnataka Legislative Assembly

Constituency details
- Country: India
- Region: South India
- State: Karnataka
- District: Tumkur
- Lok Sabha constituency: Chitradurga
- Established: 1951
- Total electors: 223,648 (2023)
- Reservation: None

Member of Legislative Assembly
- 16th Karnataka Legislative Assembly
- Incumbent T. B. Jayachandra
- Party: Indian National Congress
- Elected year: 2023
- Preceded by: C. M. Rajesh Gowda

Sira Assembly constituency is one of the 224 constituencies in the Karnataka Legislative Assembly of Karnataka, in South India. It is a segment of Chitradurga Lok Sabha constituency.

== Members of the Legislative Assembly ==
Election	Member	Party
1952	B. N. Ramegowda	Independent politician
1957	T. Taregowda	Indian National Congress
1957	P. Anjanappa	Indian National Congress
1962	C. J. Muckkannappa	Independent politician
1967	B. N. Ramegowda	Indian National Congress
1972	B. Puttakamaiah	Indian National Congress
1978	S. A. Lingaiah	Indian National Congress
1983	P. Mudle Gowda	Independent politician
1985	C. P. Mudalagiriyappa	Indian National Congress
1989	S. K. Dasappa	Indian National Congress
1994	B. Sathyanarayana	Janata Dal
1999	P. M. Ranganath	Indian National Congress
2004	B. Sathyanarayana	Janata Dal
2008	T. B. Jayachandra	Indian National Congress
2013	T. B. Jayachandra	Indian National Congress
2018	B. Sathyanarayana	Janata Dal
2020 By-election (Note: Died on 04/08/2020)	Dr. C. M. Rajesh Gowda	Bharatiya Janata Party
2023	T. B. Jayachandra	Indian National Congress

== Election results ==
=== Assembly Election 2023 ===
2023 Karnataka Legislative Assembly election : Sira
Party	Candidate	Votes	%	±%
INC	T. B. Jayachandra	86,084	45.14	▲10.37
JD(S)	R. Ugresh	56,834	29.80	▲9.54
BJP	Dr. C. M. Rajesh Gowda	42,329	22.20	▼19.96
NOTA	None of the above	722	0.38	▲0.03
Margin of victory		29,250	15.34	▲7.95
Turnout		192,539	86.09	▲3.78
Total valid votes		190,706		
Registered electors		223,648		▲3.65
INC gain from BJP		Swing	▲2.98	

=== Assembly By-election 2020 ===
2020 Karnataka Legislative Assembly by-election : Sira
Party	Candidate	Votes	%	±%
BJP	Dr. C. M. Rajesh Gowda	76,564	42.16	▲32.75
INC	T. B. Jayachandra	63,150	34.77	▼0.72
JD(S)	Ammajamma B. Sathyanarayana	36,783	20.26	▼20.98
CPI	Girish	1,697	0.93	▲0.12
NOTA	None of the above	643	0.35	▲0.03
Margin of victory		13,414	7.39	▲1.64
Turnout		177,595	82.31	▼2.46
Total valid votes		181,596		
Registered electors		215,776		▲1.47
BJP gain from JD(S)		Swing	▲0.92	

=== Assembly Election 2018 ===
2018 Karnataka Legislative Assembly election : Sira
Party	Candidate	Votes	%	±%
JD(S)	B. Sathyanarayana	74,338	41.24	▲0.38
INC	T. B. Jayachandra	63,973	35.49	▼15.47
BJP	S. R. Gowda	16,959	9.41	▼3.58
Independent	C. M. Nagaraju	14,468	8.03	New
Independent	Chidanand M. Gowda	3,610	2.00	New
CPI	Gireesh	1,457	0.81	New
Samanya Janatha Party (Loktantrik)	Kavitha R. Manangi	1,179	0.65	New
NOTA	None of the above	568	0.32	New
Margin of victory		10,365	5.75	▼4.35
Turnout		180,273	84.77	▲5.58
Total valid votes		180,264		
Registered electors		212,652		▲5.52
JD(S) gain from INC		Swing	▼9.72	

=== Assembly Election 2013 ===
2013 Karnataka Legislative Assembly election : Sira
Party	Candidate	Votes	%	±%
INC	T. B. Jayachandra	74,089	50.96	▲5.94
JD(S)	B. Sathyanarayana	59,408	40.86	▲15.46
BJP	B. K. Manjunatha	18,884	12.99	▼4.80
Independent	Shashi Kumar. R	1,642	1.13	New
KJP	Inthiyaz Ahamed	1,415	0.97	New
BSP	N. Rajanna	1,090	0.75	▼1.21
Margin of victory		14,681	10.10	▼9.52
Turnout		159,587	79.19	▲1.63
Total valid votes		145,380		
Registered electors		201,531		▲15.73
INC hold		Swing	▲5.94	

=== Assembly Election 2008 ===
2008 Karnataka Legislative Assembly election : Sira
Party	Candidate	Votes	%	±%
INC	T. B. Jayachandra	60,793	45.02	▲21.69
JD(S)	B. Sathyanarayana	34,297	25.40	▼5.46
BJP	B. K. Manjunatha	24,025	17.79	▼0.84
JD(U)	L. Nagaraju Lnr	7,087	5.25	New
BSP	D. C. Nagabhushana	2,647	1.96	New
Independent	Lingappa	2,015	1.49	New
Independent	K. Mudalagiriyappa	1,867	1.38	New
Independent	R. Dasarangappa	1,510	1.12	New
Margin of victory		26,496	19.62	▲12.09
Turnout		135,068	77.56	▲4.79
Total valid votes		135,023		
Registered electors		174,139		▲17.79
INC gain from JD(S)		Swing	▲14.16	

=== Assembly Election 2004 ===
2004 Karnataka Legislative Assembly election : Sira
Party	Candidate	Votes	%	±%
JD(S)	Sathyanarayana. B	33,166	30.86	▲13.70
INC	Sreenivasaiah (Bhoonahally Seenappa)	25,073	23.33	▼20.35
BJP	B. K. Badeeranna	20,022	18.63	New
Independent	S. K. Siddanna	17,192	16.00	New
JP	Ramesh. P. R	7,484	6.96	New
Independent	Jayamala. D. L	1,924	1.79	New
Kannada Nadu Party	Dasappa. T	1,051	0.98	New
Independent	Satyanarayana. P. B	915	0.85	New
Independent	Thippeswamy. N	650	0.60	New
Margin of victory		8,093	7.53	▼18.98
Turnout		107,591	72.77	▼0.50
Total valid votes		107,477		
Registered electors		147,844		▲5.55
JD(S) gain from INC		Swing	▼12.82	

=== Assembly Election 1999 ===
1999 Karnataka Legislative Assembly election : Sira
Party	Candidate	Votes	%	±%
INC	P. M. Ranganath	42,263	43.68	▲16.48
JD(S)	B. Satyanarayana	16,609	17.16	New
Independent	B. K. Badeeranna	15,601	16.12	New
Independent	S. K. Dasappa	13,709	14.17	New
JD(U)	P. B. Satyanarayana	6,815	7.04	New
Independent	S. Vijayakumar	952	0.98	New
Independent	Srinivasaiah	817	0.84	New
Margin of victory		25,654	26.51	▲23.55
Turnout		102,627	73.27	▼0.90
Total valid votes		96,766		
Rejected ballots		5,776	5.63	▲3.96
Registered electors		140,076		▲9.66
INC gain from JD		Swing	▲13.31	

=== Assembly Election 1994 ===
1994 Karnataka Legislative Assembly election : Sira
Party	Candidate	Votes	%	±%
JD	B. Sathyanarayana	28,272	30.37	▲1.06
INC	S. K. Siddanna	25,513	27.41	New
INC	P. M. Ranganath	25,317	27.20	▼12.11
Independent	M. Shantaram	9,883	10.62	New
BJP	D. S. Narasimhaiam	2,954	3.17	▲1.90
KRRS	Mahesh Kumar	734	0.79	New
Margin of victory		2,759	2.96	▼7.04
Turnout		94,737	74.17	▲5.64
Total valid votes		93,087		
Rejected ballots		1,582	1.67	▼4.93
Registered electors		127,731		▲8.22
JD gain from INC		Swing	▼8.94	

=== Assembly Election 1989 ===
1989 Karnataka Legislative Assembly election : Sira
Party	Candidate	Votes	%	±%
INC	S. K. Dasappa	29,699	39.31	▲7.34
JD	B. Satya Narayana	22,146	29.31	New
JP	S. A. Lingaiah	21,832	28.90	New
BJP	K. T. Mahalingappa	961	1.27	▼0.50
Margin of victory		7,553	10.00	▲9.87
Turnout		80,890	68.53	▲6.29
Total valid votes		75,554		
Rejected ballots		5,336	6.60	▲5.22
Registered electors		118,029		▲15.52
INC hold		Swing	▲7.34	

=== Assembly Election 1985 ===
1985 Karnataka Legislative Assembly election : Sira
Party	Candidate	Votes	%	±%
INC	C. P. Mudalagiriyappa	20,049	31.97	▲7.40
Independent	S. K. Siddanna	19,967	31.84	New
JP	B. Ganganna	19,321	30.81	New
BJP	S. V. Satyanarayana Setty	1,108	1.77	New
Independent	N. Ranganatha	919	1.47	New
Independent	K. H. Chandrasekhar	677	1.08	New
Margin of victory		82	0.13	▼45.06
Turnout		63,592	62.24	▼8.60
Total valid votes		62,717		
Rejected ballots		875	1.38	▼0.12
Registered electors		102,174		▲18.37
INC gain from Independent		Swing	▼37.79	

=== Assembly Election 1983 ===
1983 Karnataka Legislative Assembly election : Sira
Party	Candidate	Votes	%	±%
Independent	P. Mudle Gowda	42,015	69.76	New
INC	Krishnaiah. S. N	14,800	24.57	▲18.21
Independent	K. H. Chandrasekhar	2,339	3.88	New
IC(S)	Ramakrishna. B. G	531	0.88	New
Margin of victory		27,215	45.19	▲29.04
Turnout		61,146	70.84	▼7.23
Total valid votes		60,227		
Rejected ballots		919	1.50	▼1.13
Registered electors		86,316		▲11.62
Independent gain from INC(I)		Swing	▲14.86	

=== Assembly Election 1978 ===
1978 Karnataka Legislative Assembly election : Sira
Party	Candidate	Votes	%	±%
INC(I)	S. A. Lingaiah	32,270	54.90	New
JP	P. Mudle Gowda	22,775	38.74	New
INC	M. Maddanna	3,738	6.36	▼47.84
Margin of victory		9,495	16.15	▲2.11
Turnout		60,370	78.07	▲16.35
Total valid votes		58,783		
Rejected ballots		1,587	2.63	▲2.63
Registered electors		77,328		▲10.86
INC(I) gain from INC		Swing	▲0.70	

=== Assembly Election 1972 ===
1972 Mysore State Legislative Assembly election : Sira
Party	Candidate	Votes	%	±%
INC	B. Puttakamaiah	22,669	54.20	▲9.55
Independent	P. Mudle Gowda	16,796	40.16	New
Independent	A. Linganna	2,362	5.65	New
Margin of victory		5,873	14.04	▼10.84
Turnout		43,047	61.72	▼5.32
Total valid votes		41,827		
Registered electors		69,750		▲16.54
INC hold		Swing	▲9.55	

=== Assembly Election 1967 ===
1967 Mysore State Legislative Assembly election : Sira
Party	Candidate	Votes	%	±%
INC	B. N. Ramegowda	16,356	44.65	▲0.57
Independent	B. Puttakamaiah	7,242	19.77	New
Independent	C. J. Muckannappa	5,464	14.92	New
ABJS	S. V. S. Setty	4,114	11.23	New
Independent	K. Nagaraju	3,455	9.43	New
Margin of victory		9,114	24.88	▲15.71
Turnout		40,121	67.04	▲2.31
Total valid votes		36,631		
Registered electors		59,850		▼11.91
INC gain from Independent		Swing	▼8.60	

=== Assembly Election 1962 ===
1962 Mysore State Legislative Assembly election : Sira
Party	Candidate	Votes	%	±%
Independent	C. J. Muckkannappa	21,746	53.25	New
INC	Mali Mariappa	18,002	44.08	▼22.68
ABJS	S. V. Satyanarayana Setty	1,088	2.66	New
Margin of victory		3,744	9.17	▼20.89
Turnout		43,974	64.73	▲25.65
Total valid votes		40,836		
Registered electors		67,939		▼39.01
Independent gain from INC		Swing	▲15.12	

=== Assembly Election 1957 ===
1957 Mysore State Legislative Assembly election : Sira
Party	Candidate	Votes	%	±%
INC	T. Taregowda	33,195	38.13	▲0.12
INC	P. Anjanappa	24,926	28.63	▼9.38
Independent	Davanam. V. Satyanarayan	7,022	8.07	New
ABJS	M. Chandrasekhariah	6,926	7.96	▼12.42
ABJS	C. Doddagobari Naik	6,739	7.74	▼12.64
Independent	C. T. Hanumanthaiah	4,296	4.93	New
Independent	C. J. Mukkannappa	3,956	4.54	New
Margin of victory		26,173	30.06	▲26.46
Turnout		87,060	39.08	▼23.95
Total valid votes		87,060		
Registered electors		111,390		▲156.56
INC gain from Independent		Swing	▼3.48	

=== Assembly Election 1952 ===
1952 Mysore State Legislative Assembly election : Sira
Party	Candidate	Votes	%	±%
Independent	B. N. Ramegowda	11,387	41.61	New
INC	T. Tharegowdaru	10,401	38.01	New
ABJS	M. R. Rajappa	5,577	20.38	New
Margin of victory		986	3.60	
Turnout		27,365	63.03	
Total valid votes		27,365		
Registered electors		43,417		
Independent win (new seat)				

== See also ==
- List of constituencies of Karnataka Legislative Assembly
- Tumkur district
