= K. C. Veerendra Puppy =

Indian politician (born 1975)

K. C. Veerendra

Member of the Karnataka Legislative Assembly
- Incumbent
- Assumed office May 2023
- Preceded by: G. H. Thippareddy
- Constituency: Chitradurga

Personal details
- Born: Kondlahalli Channabasappa Veerendra; 1975 (age 50–51) Karnataka, India
- Party: Indian National Congress
- Other political affiliations: Janata Dal (Secular)
- Spouse: R. D. Chaitra
- Relatives: Doddanna (father-in-law)

Kondlahalli Channabasappa Veerendra Puppy (born 1975) is an Indian politician from Karnataka and is a member of the Karnataka Legislative Assembly from Chitradurga representing the Indian National Congress. In August 2025, he was arrested by the Enforcement Directorate (ED) for his alleged role in online money betting and for money laundering.

== Early life and education ==
Veerendra is from Challakere, Chitradurga district. His father Kondlahalli Channabasappa was a farmer. Veerendra obtained a bachelor of commerce degree in 1999 at HPPC Government First Grade College, which is affiliated with Kuvempu University.

== Career ==
Veerendra won from Chitradurga representing Indian National Congress in the 2023 Karnataka Legislative Assembly election. He polled 122,021 votes and defeated his nearest rival, G. H. Thippareddy of Bharatiya Janata Party, by a huge margin of 53,300 votes.

On 23 August 2025, the Directorate of Enforcement (ED) arrested Chitradurga from Gangtok, Sikkim, in connection with his alleged role in a case involving, now illegal, offline and online betting. On 22 August, the ED launched a raid at 31 locations and reportedly ₹12 crore was recovered in cash and foreign currency. Raids were also held in Goa on some of the casinos including Veerendra's Casino Gold, Ocean Rivers Casino and Big Daddy Casino. In August 2025, the Promotion and Regulation of Online Gaming Bill, 2025, was passed in the parliament. The bill puts an end to online money gaming in India. In December, Veerendra was granted bail. In a supplementary prosecution complaint filed in February 2026, the ED stated that proceeds of his alleged crime exceeded ₹2,300 crore.
