= Chitradurga Lok Sabha constituency =

Lok Sabha Constituency in Karnataka

Coordinates: 14.2°N 76.4°E

Chitradurga
- Lok Sabha constituency
- Chitradurga Lok Sabha Constituency Map

Constituency details
- Country: India
- Region: South India
- State: Karnataka
- Assembly constituencies: Molakalmuru; Challakere; Chitradurga; Hiriyur; Hosadurga; Holalkere; Sira; Pavagada
- Established: 2008
- Reservation: SC

Member of Parliament
- 18th Lok Sabha
- Incumbent Govind Karjol
- Party: BJP
- Elected year: 2024

Chitradurga Lok Sabha constituency is one of the 28 Lok Sabha (parliamentary) constituencies in Karnataka state in southern India. This constituency is reserved for the candidates belonging to the Scheduled castes This constituency covers the entire Chitradurga district and part of Tumkur district.

== Assembly segments ==
Chitradurga Lok Sabha constituency presently comprises the following eight Legislative Assembly segments:

| No | Name | District | Member | Party | Party Leading (in 2024) |
|---|---|---|---|---|---|
| 97 | Molakalmuru (ST) | Chitradurga | N. Y. Gopalakrishna | INC | INC |
| 98 | Challakere (ST) | Chitradurga | T. Raghumurthy | INC | INC |
| 99 | Chitradurga | Chitradurga | K. C. Veerendra Puppy | INC | BJP |
| 100 | Hiriyur | Chitradurga | Vacant | INC | BJP |
| 101 | Hosadurga | Chitradurga | B. G. Govindappa | INC | BJP |
| 102 | Holalkere (SC) | Chitradurga | M. Chandrappa | BJP | BJP |
| 136 | Sira | Tumkur | T. B. Jayachandra | INC | BJP |
| 137 | Pavagada (SC) | Tumkur | H. V. Venkatesh | INC | BJP |

== Members of Parliament ==
| Year | Member | Party |
|---|---|---|
| 1952 | S. Nijalingappa | Indian National Congress |
| 1957 | J. Mohammed Imam | Praja Socialist Party |
| 1962 | J. Veerabasappa | Indian National Congress |
| 1967 | J. Mohammed Imam | Swatantra Party |
| 1971 | K. Mallanna | Indian National Congress |
| 1977 | K. Mallanna | Indian National Congress |
| 1980 | K. Mallanna | Indian National Congress (I) |
| 1984 | K. H. Ranganath | Indian National Congress |
| 1989 | C. P. Mudalagiriyappa | Indian National Congress |
| 1991 | C. P. Mudalagiriyappa | Indian National Congress |
| 1996 | P. Kondandaramaiah | Janata Dal |
| 1998 | C. P. Mudalagiriyappa | Indian National Congress |
| 1999 | Shashi Kumar | Janata Dal |
| 2004 | N. Y. Hanumanthappa | Indian National Congress |
| 2009 | Janardhana Swamy | Bharatiya Janata Party |
| 2014 | B. N. Chandrappa | Indian National Congress |
| 2019 | A. Narayanaswamy | Bharatiya Janata Party |
| 2024 | Govind Karjol | Bharatiya Janata Party |

== Election results ==
=== 2024 ===
2024 Indian general elections: Chitradurga
| Party | Candidate | Votes | % | ±% |
|---|---|---|---|---|
| BJP | Govind Karjol | 684,890 | 50.11 | ▼0.15 |
| INC | B. N. Chandrappa | 6,36,769 | 46.58 | ▲2.76 |
| NOTA | None of the above | 3,190 | 0.23 | ▼0.12 |
| Majority | | 48,121 | 3.53 | ▼2.95 |
| Turnout | | 13,67,995 | 73.65 | ▲2.85 |
| BJP hold | | Swing | ▼0.15 | |

=== 2019 ===
2019 Indian general elections: Chitradurga
| Party | Candidate | Votes | % | ±% |
|---|---|---|---|---|
| BJP | A. Narayanswamy | 626,195 | 50.26 | ▲16.62 |
| INC | B. N. Chandrappa | 5,46,017 | 43.82 | ▲1.18 |
| BSP | C. U. Mahanthesh | 8,907 | 0.71 | N/A |
| IND. | N. T. Vijayakumar | 8,707 | 0.70 | New |
| NOTA | None of the above | 4,368 | 0.35 | |
| Majority | | 80,178 | 6.48 | ▼2.76 |
| Turnout | | 12,46,506 | 70.80 | ▲4.73 |
| BJP gain from INC | | Swing | | |

=== 2014 ===
2014 Indian general elections: Chitradurga
| Party | Candidate | Votes | % | ±% |
|---|---|---|---|---|
| INC | B. N. Chandrappa | 467,372 | 42.64 | |
| BJP | Janardhana Swamy | 3,66,220 | 33.40 | |
| JD(S) | Gullihatty D. Shekhar | 2,02,108 | 18.43 | |
| AAP | Mohana Dashari | 14,226 | 1.30 | |
| Majority | | 1,01,291 | 9.24 | |
| Turnout | | 10,97,666 | 66.07 | |
| INC gain from BJP | | Swing | | |

== See also ==
- Chitradurga district
- List of constituencies of the Lok Sabha
