= P. C. Mohan =

Indian politician (born 1963)

Member of Parliament, Lok Sabha
- Incumbent
- Assumed office 16 May 2009
- Preceded by: Constituency established
- Constituency: Bangalore Central, Karnataka

Member of Panel of Chairpersons (Lok Sabha)
- Incumbent
- Assumed office 1 July 2024 Serving with Sandhya Ray, Dilip Saikia, Jagdambika Pal, Krishna Prasad Tenneti, Kakoli Ghosh Dastidar, A. Raja, Selja Kumari, Awadhesh Prasad, N. K. Premachandran
- Appointed by: Om Birla

Member of Karnataka Legislative Assembly
- In office 6 October 1999 – 28 May 2008
- Preceded by: P. S. Prakash
- Succeeded by: Hemachandra Sagar
- Constituency: Chickpet

Personal details
- Born: 24 July 1963 (age 63) Bangalore, Mysore State, India
- Party: Bharatiya Janata Party
- Spouse: Shyla Mohan (m. 1991)
- Children: Rithika Mohan (daughter); Rithin PM (son)
- Website: https://pcmohan.com

P. Chikkamuni Mohan (born 24 July 1963) is an Indian politician from the Bharatiya Janata Party (BJP) who has been a member of the 15th, 16th, 17th, and 18th Lok Sabhas representing the Bangalore Central constituency since 2009. He is a Member of the Parliamentary Committees on External Affairs and Urban Development. A member of the BJP for more than two decades, he served as the party's Treasurer and President of BJP Karnataka's OBC wing. P. C. Mohan was previously elected twice to the Karnataka Assembly in 1999 and 2004 from Chickpet constituency.

== Political career ==
P. C. Mohan was a member of the Karnataka Legislative Assembly from Chickpet constituency from 1999 to 2008.

P. C. Mohan has been representing the Bangalore Central constituency in the Lok Sabha since the 2009 Indian general election. Out of 37 candidates in 2009, he won the 15th Lok Sabha elections with 340,162 votes against H. T. Sangliana of the Indian National Congress, who received 304,944 votes. In the 2014 Indian general election in Karnataka Mohan held the seat (he previously won in 2009) with 557,130 votes, a margin of 137,500 over his nearest rival, Rizwan Arshad of the Indian National Congress, who received 419,630 votes.

In March 2024, he was re-elected as the BJP candidate for the Bangalore Central constituency in the 2024 general elections, a post which he has held thrice in the past. As a member of the Lok Sabha's Standing Committee on Urban Development, Mohan played a crucial role. He made significant efforts to improve Bangalore's infrastructure and transportation issues, including the expansion of metro rail.

== 2025 Indian electoral controversy ==
As part of the 2025 Indian electoral controversy regarding electoral fraud, Rahul Gandhi accused the Election Commission of India (ECI) of adding fraudulent voters in collusion with the ruling BJP during the 2024 Indian general election in the Mahadevapura part of the Bangalore Central constituency citing various discrepancies. The Bangalore Central Lok Sabha election was won by Mohan. The ECI denied the claims and asked for a formal complaint.

On 1 August 2025, Rahul Gandhi, the leader of opposition in Lok Sabha, alleged electoral fraud during the 2024 Indian general election. He referred to the evidence as an "atom bomb" and stated that the ruling party will have "no place to hide." On 6 August, the opposition demanded a discussion on the special exercise carried out by the ECI for the revision of electoral rolls in Bihar. Arjun Ram Meghwal, the law minister, asked Rahul Gandhi to present the evidences regarding the fraud and stated that the functioning of the election commission cannot be debated in parliament, citing a previous precedence by Lok Sabha speaker Balram Jakhar.

On 7 August, Rahul Gandhi, in a meeting of the press, alleged that the election commission added fraudulent voters to the electoral roll in the Mahadevapura Assembly constituency in Karnataka, and accused the commission of rigging the 2024 Lok Sabha elections. The Congress lost the election to the Bangalore Central Lok Sabha constituency, of which the assembly segment was part of, by 114,000 votes despite leading in the remaining six assembly segments of the constituency. He stated that the evidences were a result of a six month long research conducted by the party, and challenged the election commission to publish an electronic voter list and CCTV footage to debunk his claims. He raised objection to bulk quantity of duplicate voters and voters with invalid addresses, large number of voters with duplicate addresses, cross-voters between different states and fraudulent form-6 applicants, or new voter registrations bypassing eligibility checks.
