= Janardhana Swamy =

Indian politician

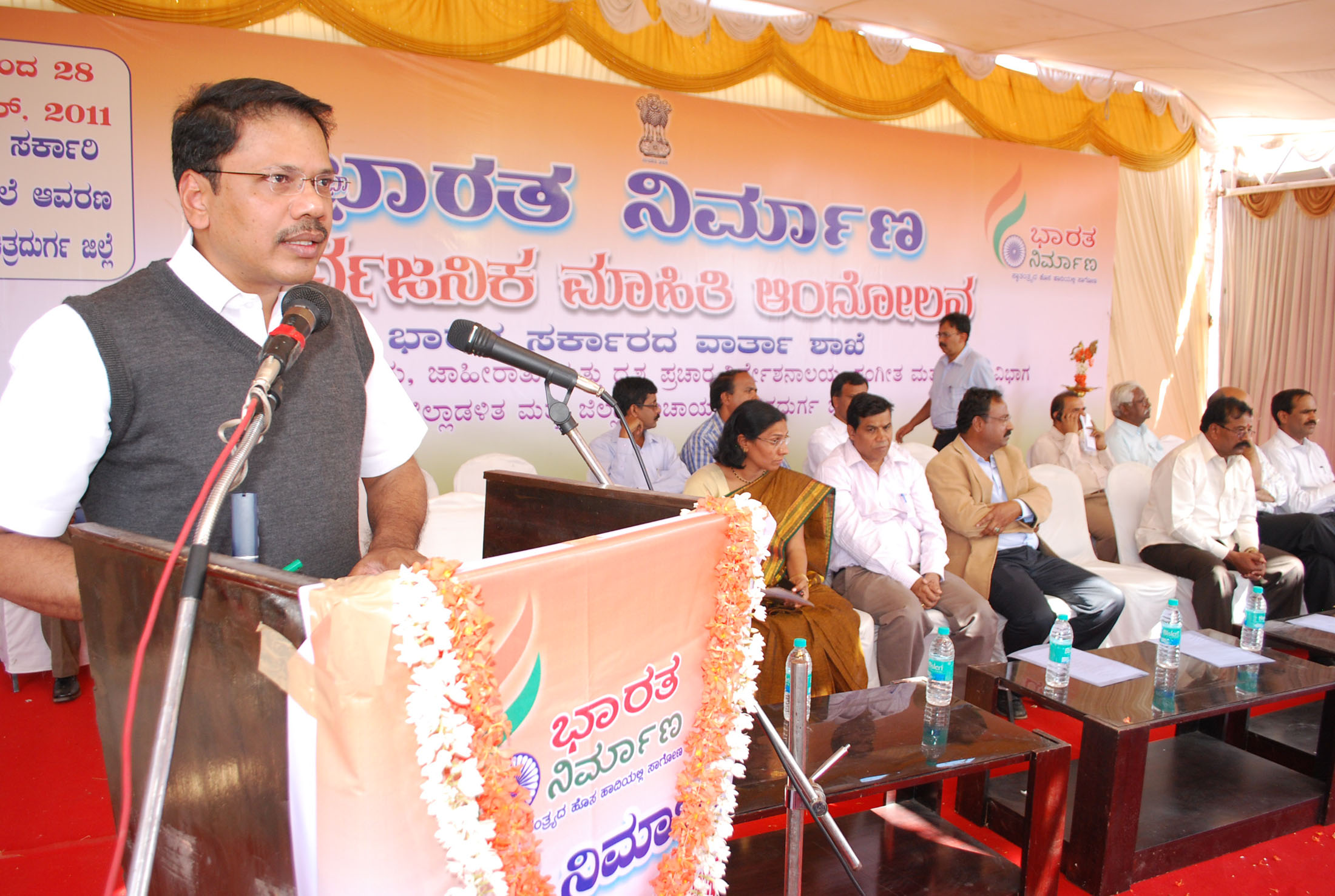
- Shri Janardhana Swamy

Member of the Indian Parliament for Chitradurga
- In office 17 May 2009 – 16 May 2014
- Preceded by: N. Y. Hanumanthappa
- Succeeded by: B N Chandrappa
- Majority: 135571

Personal details
- Born: 4 June 1968 (age 58) Chitradurga, Karnataka
- Party: Bharatiya Janata Party
- Education: U.B.D.T. College of Engineering, Davangere and Indian Institute of Science, Bangalore
- Profession: Electrical and communication engineer
- Website: jswamy.com

Janardhana Swamy served as a Member of Parliament in 15th Lok Sabha (2009-2014) representing the Chitradurga Lok Sabha Constituency in the Parliament of India.

== Early life and education ==
Janardhana Swamy is the only son for his father Venkatappa and mother Chinnadevi. His father Venkatappa was a primary school teacher in Karnataka, India. He holds a Bachelor's degree in Engineering (Instrumentation Technology) from U.B.D.T. College of Engineering, Davangere, under University of Mysore and a Master's degree in Engineering (Electrical Communication) from the Indian Institute of Science (IISc), Bangalore.

== Career ==
Swamy worked in various engineering and management positions at Cisco, Dell, Sasken, Cadence Design Systems, and Sun Microsystems. His research articles have appeared in IEEE, IETE, and other publications. He also obtained United States Patent No. 6,686,759 for "Testing embedded cores in multi-core integrated circuit designs" on 3 February 2004.

He also worked as a full-time party worker of Bharatiya Janata Party (BJP) and served as the first president of BJP IT Cell (Karnataka Division).

He contested and won the 2009 Lok Sabha election from Chitradurga, Karnataka. In 2009, Swamy became the first BJP candidate to win the Chitradurga Lok Sabha constituency. He received 370,920 votes, winning by a margin of 135,571 votes, the third-largest during the 2009 Indian general election in Karnataka.

In 2012, B.S. Yeddyurappa and B. Sriramulu left the BJP, creating the KJP and BSR parties, leading to significant electoral setbacks for the BJP in the 2013 Karnataka Assembly elections. The division notably impacted Chitradurga, a BJP challenge area, with the BSR's capture of an MLA seat in Molakalmuru, while the BJP secured only one MLA seat out of eight in the Chitradurga Lok Sabha area, underscoring the split's profound effect. Political fragmentation contributed to his loss in the 2014 Lok Sabha election from Chitradurga. The reintegration of KJP and BSR into BJP in 2014 could not fully mend the electoral damage in certain regions.

During his tenure as an MP (2009–2014), Janardhana Swamy, along with Davangere MP G.M. Siddeshwara and Tumkur MP G.S. Basavaraju, were instrumental in securing the sanction for a railway connection between Davanagere and Tumkur via Chitradurga, providing a direct connection to the state capital, Bangalore. Swamy played a key role in advancing the Upper Bhadra irrigation project, which aimed to supply 30 TMC of water from the Bhadra Dam to mitigate water scarcity in Chitradurga and surrounding regions. He resolved key political and administrative hurdles and negotiated with farmers to address concerns over tunnel construction and land acquisition delays. He played a major role in establishing DRDO, BARC, ISRO, and IISc's new facilities at Challakere.

Janardhana Swamy, representing the BJP, was elected by the Lok Sabha members to serve on the Council of Indian Institutes of Technology (IITs), the highest governing body overseeing all IITs.

== Literary works ==
He designed and illustrated cover pages for several books and publications. While he was in United States, he worked as the Chief Editor & Vice-President of California's Kannada community organisation KKNC in 2005. As a cartoonist, his works have appeared in state, national, and international publications. He is a member of the Indian Institute of Cartoonists, which promotes cartooning and hosts exhibitions. The institute has showcased works by prominent cartoonists, including Sir David Low, R. K. Laxman, and Mario Miranda, among others. It exhibited Swamy’s cartoons on 26 December 2009.

== Other Roles ==
In 15th Lok Sabha (2009–2014):

- Member of Committee on External Affairs
- Member of Committee on Agriculture, Consumer Affairs, Food & Public Distribution
- Member of Technology Committee at Lok Sabha
- Member of Karnataka State Innovation Council
