= B. N. Chandrappa =

Indian politician

B.N. Chandrappa

Member of the India Parliament for Chitradurga
- In office 17 May 2014 – 23 May 2019
- Preceded by: Janardhana Swamy
- Succeeded by: A Narayanaswamy
- Constituency: Chitradurga

Personal details
- Born: 1 October 1955 (age 70) Lakkavalli, karnataka State, India
- Party: Indian National Congress
- Spouse: Dr. C.T. Kavya (01 Mar 1992)
- Children: 1 son and 1 daughter
- Occupation: Agriculturist, Politician
- As of 15 December, 2016

B. N. Chandrappa is an Indian politician and member of Parliament in 16th Lok Sabha from the Chitradurga (Lok Sabha constituency).

On 9 April 2023, B.N. Chandrappa has been appointed as Karnatakata Pradesh Congress Committee (KPCC) working president by the Congress party. D K Shivakumar leads the Karnataka unit.

== Early life and background ==
Chandrappa was born to Nagappa and Lakshmamma on 1 October 1955 in Lakkavalli town of Chikkamagaluru district.

He was elected as a Zilla Parishad member from 1986 to 1991 and later assumed the position of vice-president from 1991 to 1992, holding a state minister's rank. Chandrappa also served as the Lidkar chairman during the period of 2001 to 2003, under the SM Krishna regime.

B. N. Chandrappa has obtained a Master's degree in Sociology from C.V. Raman University, Karnataka, where he pursued his education.

== Personal life ==
Chandrappa married Dr. S.T. Kavya on 01 Mar 1992. The couple has 1 son and 1 daughter.

== Position held ==
#	From	To	Position
1.	1986	1991	Member of Zilla Parishad, Chikkamangalore
2.	1991	1992	Vice-President, (Rank of Deputy Minister), Zilla Parishad, Chikkamangalore
3.	2001	2003	Chairman, Karnataka State LIDKAR Board
4.	2014		MP 16th Lok Sabha from Chitradurga (Lok Sabha constituency): Member, Standing Committee on Chemicals and Fertilizers (1 Sep. 2014 onwards); Member, Consultative Committee, Ministry of Agriculture (1 Sep. 2014 onwards)
