= M. Chandrappa =

Indian politician

M. Chandrappa (born 10 May 1957) is an Indian politician from Karnataka. He is a member of the Karnataka Legislative Assembly from Holalkere Assembly constituency which is reserved for SC community in Chitradurga district. He won the 2023 Karnataka Legislative Assembly election representing Bharatiya Janata Party.

== Early life and education ==
Chandrappa is from Chitradurga. He is the son of Masiyappa. He completed his graduation in arts in 1989.

== Career ==
Chandrappa was elected as an MLA for the third time from Holalkere Assembly constituency representing Bharatiya Janata Party in the 2023 Karnataka Legislative Assembly election. He polled 88,732 votes and defeated his nearest rival, H. Anjaneya of the Indian National Congress, by a margin of 5,682 votes. In March 2024, his son was denied a BJP ticket to contest the Lok Sabha election from Chitradurga. He was first elected as an MLA winning the 2008 Karnataka Legislative Assembly election. In 2008, he defeated H. Anjaneya of the Indian National Congress by a margin of 15,368 votes. He won for the second time winning the 2018 Karnataka Legislative Assembly election. He polled 107,976 votes and defeated his closest opponent, Anjaneya again, by a margin of 38,940 votes.
