= University B.D.T. College of Engineering =

Engineering college in Davangere, India

- Type: Government
- Established: 1951
- Principal: Dr. D P Nagarajappa
- Location: Hadadi Road, Post Box No. 304, Davangere-577 004, Davangere, Karnataka, India; 14°27′6″N 75°55′3″E
- Campus: Urban, approx 46.4 acres, Davangere city center, Behind District Stadium.
- Website: http://www.ubdtce.org

The University B.D.T. College of Engineering constituent college of VTU university (UBDTCE) is an engineering college located in Davangere, India. UBDTCE is one of the oldest engineering colleges in Karnataka.

== Overview ==
University B.D.T. College of Engineering (UBDTCE), Davangere, is located in the central part of Karnataka. Started in 1951, the college was named after Brahmappa Devendrappa Tavanappanavar (BDT), after B.T. Chandranna donated, in rupees, 1.5 lakhs for the construction of the building in memory of his uncle (Brahmappa Tavanappanavar) and father (Devendrappa Tavanappanavar). The then-maharaja of Mysore Sri Jayachamarajendra Wodeyar Bahadur laid the foundation stone for the building on 7 August 1951 and inaugurated the building on 24 September 1956.

At its start in 1951 it had only one branch, in civil engineering. Subsequently, other branches of engineering were incorporated, such as Mechanical and Electrical & Electronics (in 1957), Electronics & Communication (in 1972), Computer Science and Instrumentation Technology (in 1984) and Industrial & Production (in 1996). The present intake of the college from all these branches is 390 at the undergraduate level. A postgraduate course in Production Engineering Systems Technology was started in the year 1987.

Later on, the college was transferred to Kuvempu University, as a constituent engineering college on 1 June 1992, and hence it became University B.D.T. College of Engineering. In 2003, seven additional postgraduate courses were introduced in different disciplines. Currently the total intake at the postgraduate level is 175. The college has produced about 40 Ph.Ds, and many research scholars are pursuing their doctoral degree in various frontiers of engineering and technology. At present about 2,000 students are studying in this college. As a consequence of the formation of Davangere, the University U.B.D.T. College of Engineering became a constituent college of Davangere University on 18 August 2009. Recently, with the intention of the overall development of the college, the government of Karnataka transferred the college to the Visvesvaraya Technological University (VTU), Belgaum, on 24 February 2011, as a constituent engineering college. The VTU intends to start MBA and MCA courses for the academic year in this college.

The college undertakes consultancy works in civil, electrical and electronics, and other fields of engineering.

The college was one among the fourteen institutions in the state of Karnataka to get the World Bank-aided TEQIP Project Phase-I and utilized a grant of rupees from Nine Crores for improving its infrastructural facilities and enhancing the quality of its academic standards. The institution is also expecting World Bank-aided TEQIP Project Phase-IT to further improve its research and development activities and infrastructure.

The college is approved by AICTE, and undergraduate courses were accredited by NBA in the year 2001 for five years. Further, the faculty of Computer Science and Engineering, Electronics, and Communication Engineering were all accredited by the NBA in the year 2009 for a period of three years. For the other departments, the NBA accreditation process is still in progress.

The college library is equipped with a fair number of rare collections of old books and was further enriched with the latest volumes during TEQIP phase-I.

The students are actively involved in co-curricular and extracurricular activities. The annual cultural festival "Chaitra" takes place every year, which creates a platform for exhibiting the hidden talents of students.

The institution is a member of the Red Cross Society, "Thern". Other facilities available are Science and Technology Entrepreneurs' Park (STEP), Industry Institute Partnership Cell (IIPC), ISTE Staff and Students Chapters, Co-operative Society, among others. Further, the institution has both a boys' and girls' hostel to accommodate students from outside.

The Placement & Training Center is actively involved in placing the students in reputed organizations. Various companies such as TCS, Mindtree, Infosys, HCL, SLK Software, Siemens, Nokia, and Zindal visit the college regularly. The college will complete 60 years of existence in 2011 and is planning to celebrate its diamond jubilee soon.

The College has the National Cadet Corps Unit and the cadets are actively participates in the activities organised by NCC Unit. The college NCC unit got a permanent NCC Officer in 2017, its after nearly 3.5 decades.

== Admission ==
Admission to the college is made completely through the Common Entrance Test (CET) and PGCET conducted by the Karnataka Examination Authority (KEA). Selection is based on merit and reservation in accordance with the policies of the government of Karnataka. The CET will be generally conducted during the months of April/May of every year and PGCET during the months July/August.

== Programmes offered ==
Graduate courses in engineering

- Electronics and Communications Engineering
- Electrical and Electronics Engineering
- Electronics and Instrumentation Engineering
- Mechanical Engineering
- Robotics and Artificial Intelligence
- Civil Engineering
- Computer science and Engineering

Postgraduate courses in engineering

- Computer-aided design of structures and substructures
- Computer Science and Engineering
- Digital Communication and Networking
- Environmental Engineering
- Machine Design
- Power System and Power Electronics
- Production Engineering Systems and Technology
- Thermal Power Engineering

Postgraduate courses

- M.C.A
- M.B.A
