= H. Anjaneya =

Indian politician

Minister of Social welfare and Backward Classes Welfare Government of Karnataka
- In office 2013 – 15 May 2018
- Succeeded by: C. Puttarangashetty

Member of the Karnataka Legislative Assembly
- In office 2013–2018
- Preceded by: M. Chandrappa
- Succeeded by: M. Chandrappa
- Constituency: Holalkere
- In office 2004–2007
- Preceded by: M. Chandrappa
- Succeeded by: Seat ceased to exist
- Constituency: Bharamasagara

Personal details
- Born: Holalkere
- Party: Indian National Congress
- Occupation: Politician

Holalkere Anjaneya is an Indian Politician from the state of Karnataka. He is a member of the Karnataka Legislative Assembly representing the Holalkere constituency.

== Political party ==
He is from the Indian National Congress.

== Ministry ==
He was the Minister for Social Welfare in the Siddaramaiah led Karnataka Government from 2013–14 to 2018-19.
