= G. H. Thippareddy =

Indian politician

Member of the Karnataka Legislative Assembly
- Incumbent
- Assumed office 2013
- Preceded by: Basavarajan
- Constituency: Chitradurga

Member of the Karnataka Legislative Assembly
- In office 1994–2008
- Preceded by: H. Ekanthaiah
- Succeeded by: Basavarajan
- Constituency: Chitradurga

President of Reddy Jana Sangha Chitradurga
- Preceded by: V.T.Ramareddy

Personal details
- Party: Bharatiya Janata Party
- Occupation: Politician

G. H. Thippareddy is an Indian politician from the state of Karnataka. He is a five term member of the Karnataka Legislative Assembly.

== Constituency ==
He represents the Chitradurga constituency.

== Political party ==
He won as an independent candidate in Chitradurga for the first time in 1994 Karnataka elections. He later joined the Indian National Congress party and was the MLA of Congress in Chitradurga constituency. He left the Congress party and joined Bharatiya Janata Party.
