= B. G. Govindappa =

Indian politician

Member of Karnataka Legislative Assembly
- Incumbent
- Assumed office 2023
- Preceded by: Gulhatty D. Shekhar
- Constituency: Hosadurga
- In office 2013–2018
- Preceded by: Gulhatty D. Shekhar
- Succeeded by: Gulhatty D. Shekhar
- Constituency: Hosadurga
- In office 1999–2008
- Preceded by: T. H. Basavaraja
- Succeeded by: Gulhatty D. Shekhar
- Constituency: Hosadurga

Personal details
- Born: 20 October 1955 (age 70)
- Party: Indian National Congress
- Occupation: Politician

B. G. Govindappa is an Indian politician from the state of Karnataka. He is a leader of the Indian National Congress. He is currently serving as member of Karnataka Legislative Assembly from Hosadurga.

== Political career ==
He won four times as an MLA in 1999, 2004,2013 and in 2023. But in 2018 elections he was defeated by Gulhatty D. Shekhar of Bharatiya Janata Party.

He was appointed chairman for Food and Civil Supplies Corporation on 26 January 2024.
