= N. Y. Hanumanthappa =

Indian politician, Judge

Justice N.Y. Hanumanthappa

Member of parliament of 14th Lok Sabha
- In office 2004–2009
- Preceded by: Shashi Kumar
- Succeeded by: Janardhana Swamy
- Constituency: Chitradurga

18th Chief Justice of Odisha High Court
- In office 17 February 2001 – 24 September 2001
- Preceded by: Biswanath Agrawal
- Succeeded by: P. K. Balasubramanyan

Personal details
- Born: 25 September 1939 (age 86) Chitradurga, Karnataka, India
- Party: INC
- Spouse: N.Y. Adilakshmi
- Children: 3 sons
- Relatives: N. Y. Gopalakrishna (brother)
- As of 25 September, 2006

N.Y. Hanumanthappa (born 25 September 1939) was a member of the 14th Lok Sabha of India. He represented the Chitradurga constituency of Karnataka and is a member of the Indian National Congress (INC) political party.

Before his election to the Lok Sabha, Hanumanthappa served as chief justice of the Orissa High Court, having previously served on the High Courts of Karnataka and Andhra Pradesh.

Hanumanthappa unsuccessfully contested Lok Sabha elections in 2009 and 2014 from Bellary constituency in Karnataka.
