= Kushtagi Lok Sabha constituency =

Former constituency of the Indian parliament in Karnataka

Coordinates: 15.8°N 76.2°E

Kustagi
- Former Lok Sabha constituency

Constituency details
- Country: India
- State: Hyderabad
- Established: 1951
- Abolished: 1956
- Reservation: None

Kushtagi Lok Sabha constituency was a former Lok Sabha constituency in Hyderabad State, India. This seat came into existence in 1951. With the implementation of States Reorganisation Act, 1956, it ceased to exist.

== Assembly segments ==
Kustagi Lok Sabha constituency comprised the following seven Legislative Assembly segments:

1. Lingsugur
2. Manvi
3. Sindhanur
4. Gangavati
5. Koppal
6. Yelburga
7. Kushtagi

After Raichur district of erstwhile Hyderabad State got merged with Mysore State in 1956, this seat ceased to exist and was replaced by Koppal Lok Sabha constituency.

== Members of Parliament ==
- 1952: Shiv Murthy Swamy, Independent

== Election results ==
=== 1952 ===
1951 Indian general election: Kushtagi
Party	Candidate	Votes	%	±%
Independent	Shiv Murthy Swamy			
Margin of victory				
Turnout				
Independent win (new seat)				

== See also ==
- Koppal Lok Sabha constituency
- Koppal district
- Raichur district
- List of former constituencies of the Lok Sabha
