= Koppal Lok Sabha constituency =

Constituency of the Indian parliament in Karnataka

Coordinates: 15.3°N 76.1°E

Koppal
- Lok Sabha constituency
- Koppal Lok Sabha Constituency Map

Constituency details
- Country: India
- Region: South India
- State: Karnataka
- Assembly constituencies: Sindhanur; Maski; Kushtagi; Kanakagiri; Gangawati; Yelburga; Koppal; Siruguppa
- Established: 1952
- Reservation: None

Member of Parliament
- 18th Lok Sabha
- Incumbent K. Rajashekar Basavaraj Hitnal
- Party: Indian National Congress
- Elected year: 2024

Koppal Lok Sabha constituency is one of the 28 Lok Sabha (parliamentary) constituencies in Karnataka state in southern India. This constituency covers the entire Koppal district and parts of Raichur and Bellary districts.

== Assembly segments ==
Koppal Lok Sabha constituency presently comprises the following eight Legislative Assembly segments:

No	Name	District	Member	Party	Party Leading (in 2024)
58	Sindhanur	Raichur	Hampanagouda Badarli	INC	BJP
59	Maski (ST)	Raichur	Basanagowda Turvihal	INC	INC
60	Kushtagi	Koppal	Doddanagouda Patil	BJP	BJP
61	Kanakagiri (SC)	Koppal	Shivaraj Tangadagi	INC	INC
62	Gangawati	Koppal	G. Janardhana Reddy	BJP	INC
63	Yelburga	Koppal	Basavaraj Rayareddy	INC	INC
64	Koppal	Koppal	K. Raghavendra Hitnal	INC	INC
92	Siruguppa (ST)	Ballari	B. M. Nagaraja	INC	INC

== Members of Parliament ==
Year	Member	Party
1952	Sivamurthi Swami Alavandi	Independent
1957	Sangappa Agadi	Indian National Congress
1962	Sivamurthi Swami Alavandi	Lok Sewak Sangh
1967	Sangappa Agadi	Indian National Congress
1971	Siddarameshwar Swamy	Indian National Congress
1977	Siddarameshwar Swamy	Indian National Congress
1980	H. G. Ramulu	Indian National Congress
1984	H. G. Ramulu	Indian National Congress
1989	Basavaraj Patil Anwari	Janata Dal
1991	Basavaraj Patil Anwari	Indian National Congress
1996	Basavaraj Rayareddy	Janata Dal
1998	H. G. Ramulu	Indian National Congress
1999	H. G. Ramulu	Indian National Congress
2004	K. Virupaxappa	Indian National Congress
2009	Shivaramagouda Shivanagouda	Bharatiya Janata Party
2014	Karadi Sanganna	Bharatiya Janata Party
2019	Karadi Sanganna	Bharatiya Janata Party
2024	K. Rajashekar Basavaraj Hitnal	Indian National Congress

== Election results ==
=== General Election 2024 ===
2024 Indian general election: Koppal
Party	Candidate	Votes	%	±%
INC	Rajashekar Hitnal	663,511	49.93	
BJP	Basavaraj S. Kyavater	617,154	46.44	
NOTA	None of the above	3,519	0.26	
Majority		46,357	3.49	
Turnout		1,329,839	71.23	
INC gain from BJP		Swing		

=== 2019 ===
2019 Indian general elections: Koppal
Party	Candidate	Votes	%	±%
BJP	Karadi Sanganna Amarappa	584,997	49.25	
INC	K. Rajashekar Basavaraj Hitnal	547,573	46.10	
NOTA	None of the above	10,800	0.91	
BSP	Shivaputrappa. Gumagera	9,469	0.80	
Majority		38,397	3.23	
Turnout		1,190,627	68.56	
BJP hold		Swing		

=== 2014 ===
2014 Indian general elections: Koppal
Party	Candidate	Votes	%	±%
BJP	Karadi Sanganna Amarappa	486,383	48.32	
INC	Basavaraj Hitnal	453,969	45.10	
NOTA	None of the above	12,947	1.29	
BSP	Syed Arif	9,529	0.95	
Margin of victory		32,414	3.22	
Turnout		1,007,430	65.63	
BJP hold		Swing		

== See also ==
- Kushtagi
- Koppal district
- List of constituencies of the Lok Sabha
