= Basavaraj Rayareddy =

Indian politician

Financial Advisor to Chief Minister of Karnataka and Member of Karnataka Legislative Assembly
- Incumbent
- Assumed office 2023
- Preceded by: Halappa Achar
- Constituency: Yelburga
- In office 2013–2018
- Preceded by: Eshanna Gulagannavar
- Succeeded by: Halappa Achar
- Constituency: Yelburga
- In office 2004–2008
- Preceded by: Shivasharanappa Gouda Patil
- Succeeded by: Eshanna Gulagannavar
- Constituency: Yelburga
- In office 1985–1996
- Preceded by: Lingaraj Shivashankara Rao Desai
- Succeeded by: Rudragouda Hunsihal
- Constituency: Yelburga

Minister of Higher Education Government of Karnataka
- In office June 2016 – May 2018
- Preceded by: R. V. Deshpande
- Succeeded by: G. T. Devegowda

Minister of Housing Government of Karnataka
- In office 1994–1996
- Succeeded by: H. D. Revanna

Member of Parliament Lok Sabha
- In office 1996–1998
- Preceded by: Basavaraj Patil Anwari
- Succeeded by: H. G. Ramulu
- Constituency: Koppal

Personal details
- Born: 6 September 1956 (age 69) Talakal
- Party: Indian National Congress
- Other political affiliations: Janata Dal; Janata Dal (United)
- Occupation: Politician
- Profession: Farmer, lawyer

Basavaraj Rayareddy (born 6 September 1956) is an Indian politician and a member of the Indian National Congress from the state of Karnataka.

Rayareddy is a six-term member of the Karnataka Legislative Assembly and a one-term member of the 11th Lok Sabha. In June 2016 Rayareddy was inducted into the Siddaramaiah led government of Karnataka as a cabinet minister and was the Higher Education Minister.

== Political life ==
Rayareddy is from the Indian National Congress and represents Yelburga constituency of Koppal district, Karnataka. Rayareddy started his political career in the Janata Dal in the early 1980s and by the late 1980s, he moved to the Janata Dal (United). By early 2000, he joined the Indian National Congress. Rayareddy was first elected to the Karnataka Legislative Assembly in 1985 on a Janata Dal ticket winning against Subhaschandra Baswalingangouda Patil of the Indian National Congress by about 5000 votes. In the 1989 Karnataka Legislative Assembly election Rayareddy stood on a Janata Dal ticket and again won against Subhaschandra Baswalingangouda Patil of the Indian National Congress by about 2000 votes.

In 1996 he fought the 11th Lok Sabha election and was elected as a Member of Parliament on a Janata Dal ticket, he beat Anwari Basavaraj Patil of the Indian National Congress by about 70000 votes. Rayareddy contested the next 12th Lok Sabha and 13th Lok Sabha general election on a Janata Dal and a Janata Dal (United) ticket and lost both times to H. G. Ramulu of the Indian National Congress. Rayareddy fought the 2008 Karnataka Legislative Assembly election on an Indian National Congress ticket and lost to Eshanna Gulagannavar of the Bharatiya Janata Party (BJP) by about 29,000 votes.

Rayareddy was elected again as a member of the Karnataka Legislative Assembly in the 2013 assembly election on an Indian National Congress ticket by defeating Achar Halappa Basappa of the BJP by about 26,000 votes. At the 2018 elections, he was defeated by Achar Halappa Basappa of the BJP by a margin of over 13,000 votes.

== Ministry ==
Basvaraj Rayareddy is presently working as Financial Advisor to Chief Minister of Karnataka. Rayareddy was the Higher Education Minister in Siddaramaiah led Government. In his thirty-year political career Rayareddy has held many posts in the Karnataka Legislative Assembly and the Government of Karnataka.

Rayareddy was the Housing Minister from 1994 -1996 in the HDDevegouda led Government of Karnataka.
