= H. G. Ramulu =

Indian politician

Member of Parliament Lok Sabha
- In office 1998–2004
- Preceded by: Basavaraj Rayareddy
- Succeeded by: K. Virupaxappa
- Constituency: Koppal
- In office 1980–1989
- Preceded by: Siddarameshwar Swamy
- Succeeded by: Basavaraj Patil Anwari
- Constituency: Koppal

Member of Karnataka Legislative Assembly
- In office 1974–1977
- Preceded by: H. R. Sriramulu
- Succeeded by: C. Yadave Rao Shesha Rao
- Constituency: Gangawati

Personal details
- Party: INC

H. G. Ramulu is Indian politician from Karnataka. He is member of Indian National Congress. He was elected four times as the Member of Parliament from Koppal in Northern Karnataka.
