= Bhajahari Mahato =

Indian politician

Member of Parliament, Lok Sabha
- In office 1952–1957
- Preceded by: Constituency Established
- Succeeded by: Constituency Dissolved
- Constituency: Manbhum South Cum Dhalbhum
- In office 1962–1972
- Preceded by: Bibhuti Bhusan Das Gupta
- Succeeded by: Debendranath Mahato
- Constituency: Purulia

Personal details
- Born: 1911
- Died: 2003
- Political party: Lok Sewak Sangha

Bhajahari Mahato (1911–2003) was an Indian politician belonging to Lok Sewak Sangha. He was elected thrice as a member of the Lok Sabha.

== Early life ==
Mahato was born on 1911. He took part in Civil disobedience movement and August movement. He was arrested during the British Rule. He was sentenced to seven years in prison. Later, he was released in 1946.

== Post independence career ==
After the formation of Lok Sewak Sangha Mahato joined the party from Indian National Congress. He was elected as a member of the Lok Sabha from erstwhile Manbhum South Cum Dhalbhum in 1952 as a Lok Sewak Sangha candidate. Later, he was elected from Purulia in 1962 and 1967.

== Role in Bengali language movement in Manbhum ==
Mahato took part in the Bengali language movement in Manbhum. He raised the issue of Bengali language movement in Manbhum in the Lok Sabha. He wrote Tusu songs during that time. He wrote the Tusu song titled "Shun Bihari Bhai Tora Rakhte Larbi Dang Dekhai". He was arrested by the Government of Bihar during that time.

== Personal life ==
Mahato was married to Shanto Devi in 1926. They had two sons and two daughters.

== Death ==
Mahato died in 2003.
