= Bengali Language Movement (Manbhum) =

Movement in Bihar Province, India, to promote Bengali

Manbhum Language Movement
- Part of Bengali language movements in India
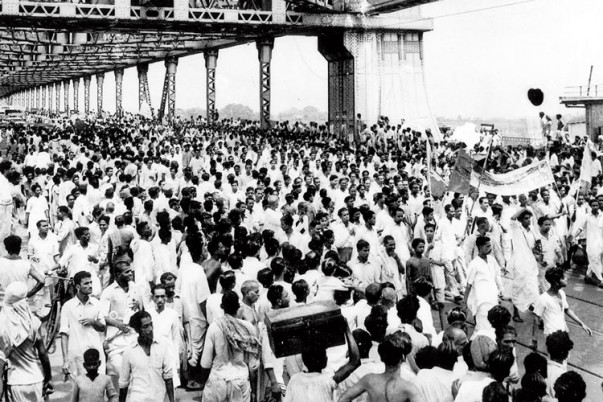
- A procession of people of Manbhum is crossing Howrah Bridge, 6 May 1956
- Date: 1948 – 1956
- Location: Manbhum, Bihar (modern Purulia district of West Bengal and adjoining areas of Jharkhand); 23°20′N 86°22′E
- Caused by: Hindi imposition
- Goals: Bengali nationalism
- Methods: Protests, sit-ins, demonstrations
- Result: Area delimitation (November 1956)
- Location of the movement

The Bengali Language Movement of Manbhum was a cultural and political movement that took place in the then Bihar Province from 1912 to 1956. Post independence, between 1948 and 1956, the language movement spread intensely among the Bengalis of Manbhum. Through this movement created around the Bengali language, the public demand for the establishment of Bengali as one of the official languages of the Bihar, mainly Manbhum, was expressed. This language movement was first ever linguistic movement for Bengali language and the longest language movement in the world.

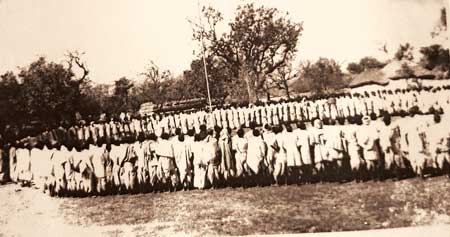
Protesters take oath in Pakbirra for language movement

The Bihar and Orissa Province was formed in 1912 by dividing the Bengal Presidency. At that time Bengali speaking Manbhum was included in the newly formed province. In 1936, the Bihar and Orissa Province was divided to form the Bihar Province, but Bengali-speaking Manbhum was kept with Hindi-dominant Bihar Province. In 1948, the then Government of Bihar declared Hindi as the only official language in the whole of Bihar including Manbhum. In the context of these incidents, deep anger was born among the Bengali-speaking common people of Manbhum and created adverse reactions. Practically the Bengali speaking people of Manbhum could not accept this unfair decision and were not mentally prepared at all. As a result, the movement in Manbhum to demand the equal status of Bengali language quickly spread. To suppress the movement, the Government of Bihar declared protest marches, meetings etc. illegal and prohibited.

The growing mass movement finally forced the Government of Bihar to capitulate. In 1956, the Government of India split Manbhum district to form Purulia district and merged it with West Bengal as a new district.

== Background ==
In 1765, the nominal Mughal Emperor Shah Alam II was defeated to the British East India Company in the Battle of Buxar. He granted "Diwani" (right to collect revenue) of Bengal (which included Bihar) to the East India Company. The East India Company started Tax-Collection process in the Jungal Mahal area. To have a greater Control over the area, East India Company split the area into smaller districts like Panchet (1773), Jungle-Mahal (1805) and Manbhum (1833). The Manbhum District was formed with an area of 20,450.5 square kilometres (7,896 square miles). The district of Manbhum was again split in 1845, 1846, 1871 and finally in 1879, and as a result the area of Manbhum was reduced to 10,650 square kilometres (4,112 square miles).

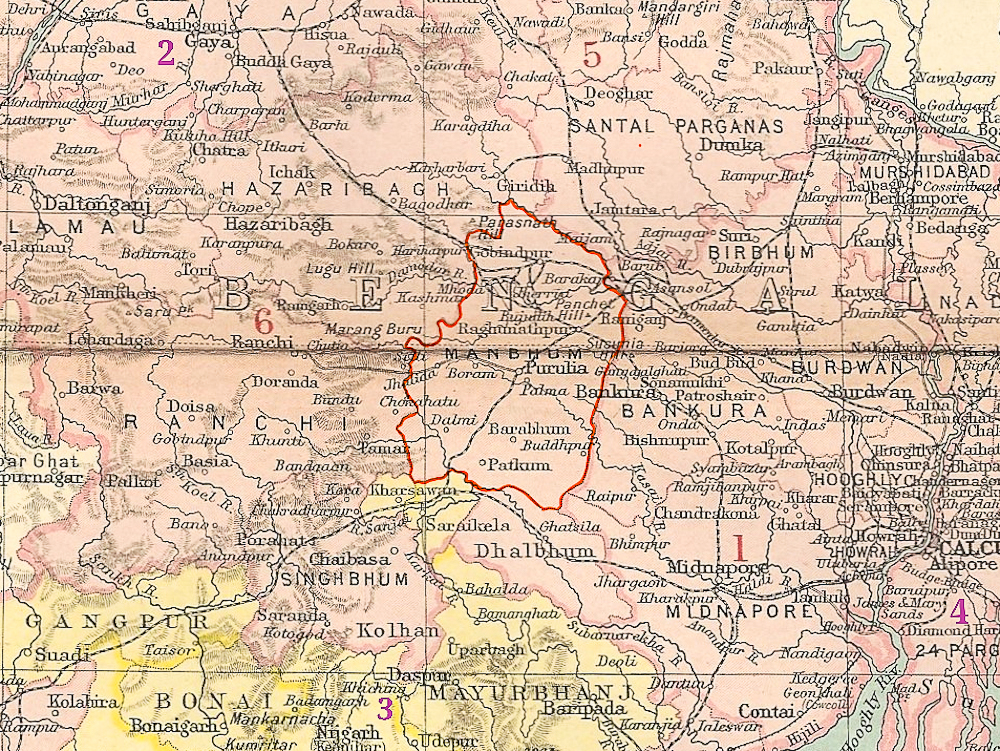
Outline of Manbhum district, 1901 Bengal Tributary States Border of Manbhum district Division of Bengal: 1. Burdwan; 2. Patna; 3. Orissa; 4. Presidency; 5. Bhagalpur; 6. Chota Nagpur

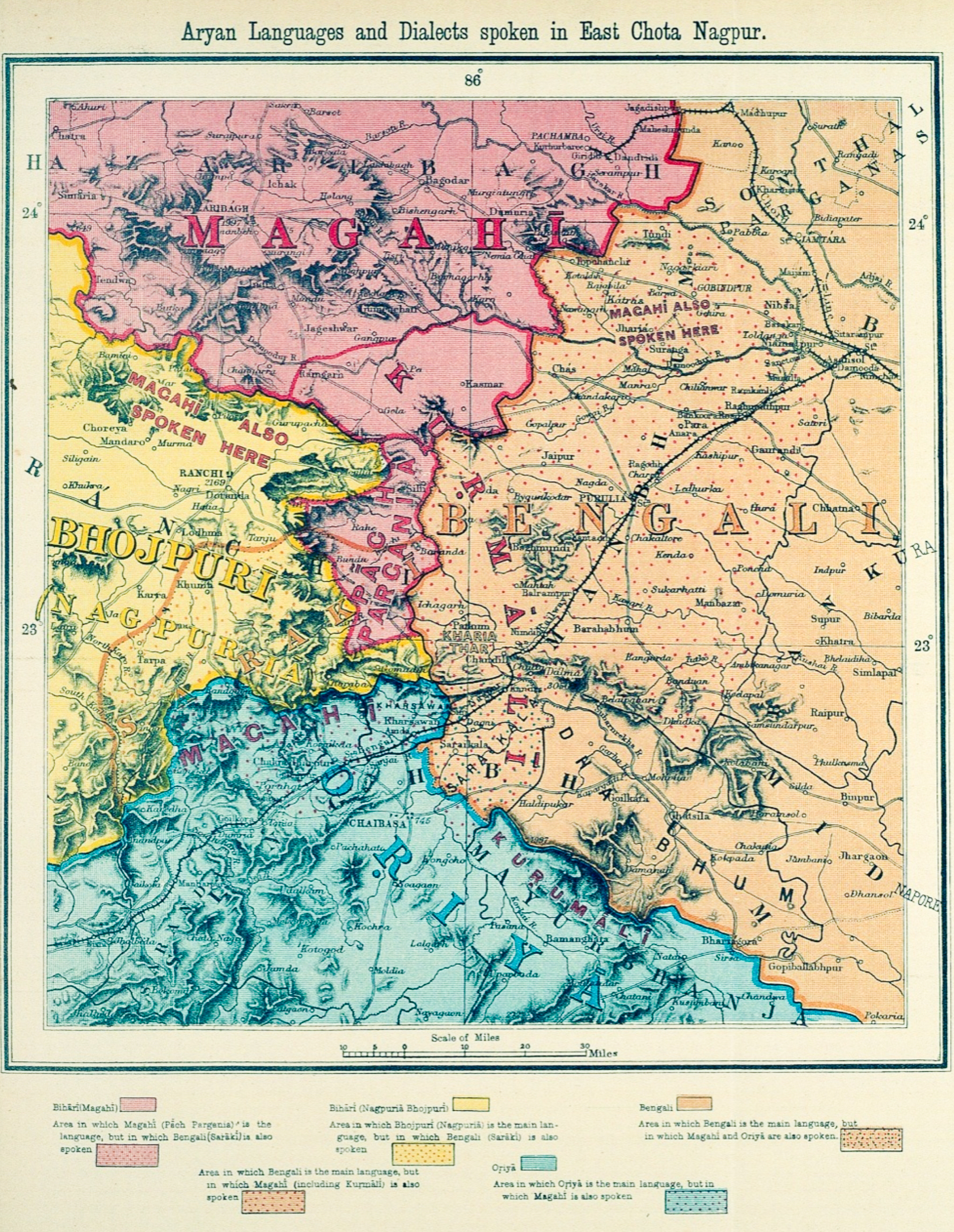
1903 linguistic map by George Abraham Grierson showing Manbhum as part of the Bengali-speaking region, bordering Magahi- and Odia-speaking areas.

Bengali-Hindi language variation in Manbhum (1901-1951): Bengali speakers, historically over 60%, declined between 1931–1951, while Hindi speakers grew by 25% from their usual 10–20%. Other languages, mainly Santali, remained steady.

The Partition of Bengal was started in 1905, and, as an effect of that, a new state, Bihar-Odisha, was formed. The Manbhum District was included to the Bihar-Odisha. The whole district started protesting against the inclusion. The language movement or Bhasa Andolon had started as a demand to include Manbhum District as a part of Bengal.

At the time of independence of India in 1947, Manbhum district was a part of Bihar. From 1948 Bengali speaking peoples of Manbhum district started suffering as restrictions on Bengali language as well as forcible imposition of Hindi language over Bengali speaking people had started. Bengali officers of Manbhum district were transferred to the others districts of Bihar, D.I. of school issued notice to teach Hindi from Primary classes, Bengali department was closed in zilla school. Installation of notice board in Hindi language become Compulsory for the schools and business establishment. Presenting the Domicile Certificate became mandatory for the Bengalis of Manbhum District. Hindi was declared as official language of Manbhum District.

== The Movement ==
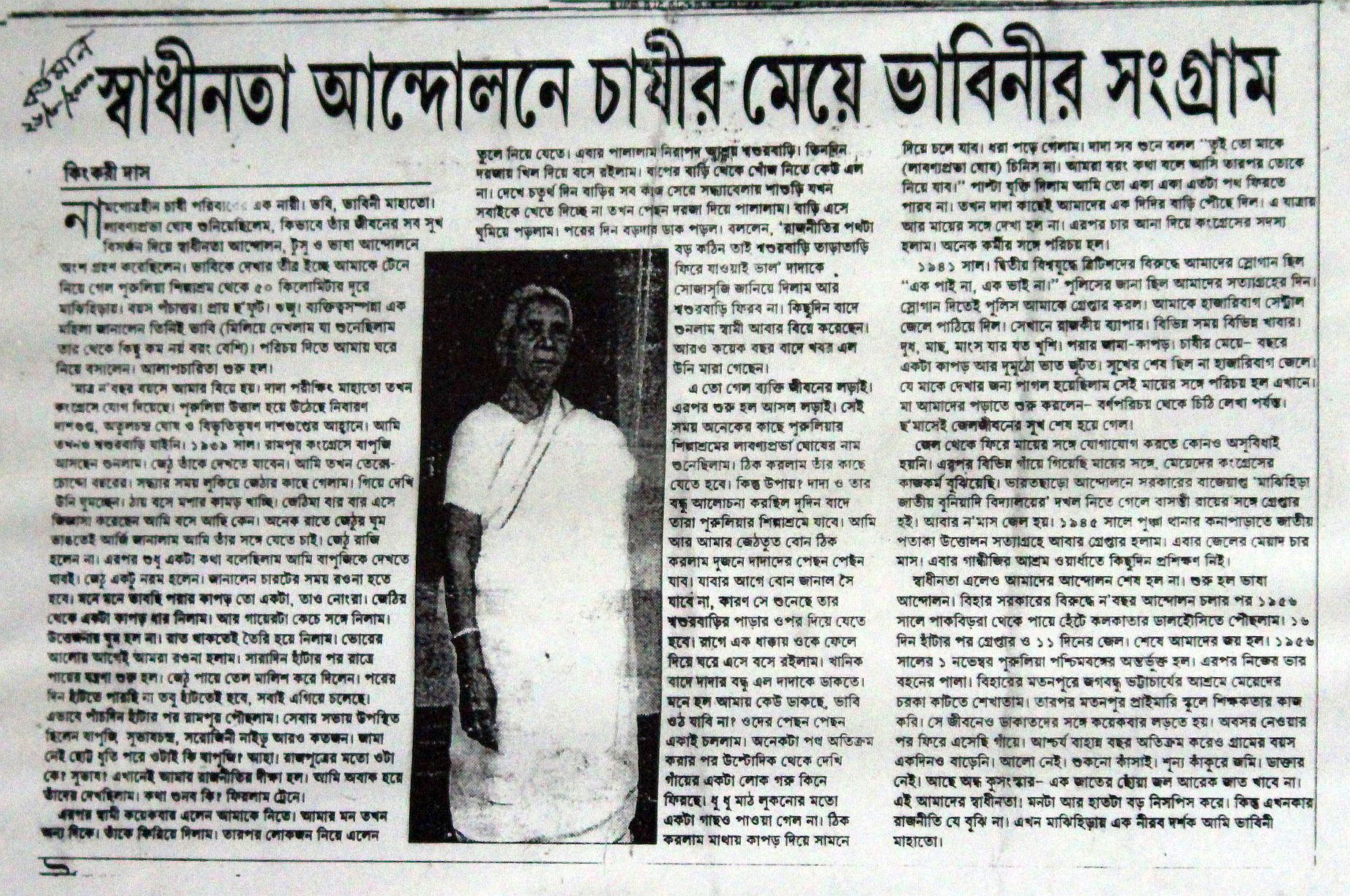
Interview of freedom fighter who participated in Bengali Language Movement (Manbhum)

After seeing the plight of Bengali speaking people, a proposal to make the Bengali as the language of Manbhum district has given. But it was defeated in 43–55 at the Congress Party on 30 May 1948. On 14 June 1948 the Lok Sevak Sangha was established to protect Bengali Language as well as to fight for forcible imposition of Hindi Language over the Bengali Language as the state policy of the then Bihar government.

The government restricted the use of Bengali language in education to the Bengali speaking people of Manbhum District. The government banned rallies also. All these incident sparked the protest to the fullest in Manbhum District. The Lok Sewak Sangh conducted a total of three movements to demand the establishment of Bengali language and merger of Manbhum with West Bengal, namely a) Satyagraha Movement from 1949 to 1951, b) Hal Joal Satyagraha and c) Tusu Satyagraha Movement from 9 January to 8 February 1954.

=== Satyagraha Andolan: 1949–1951 ===
Protest meetings and processions of Bengali speakers were banned in Manbhum district. As a result, the non-violent Satyagraha movement began. At this time the Government of Bihar tried its best to suppress the movement. Atul Chandra Ghosh, the main face of the movement, was arrested, and sent to Hazaribagh Jail, 135 miles away from Manbhum. Thousands of Bengali-speaking agitators who took part in the movement were thrown into jail. Activist Raghav Charmkar died while under trial.

=== Hal Joal Andolan ===
The Government of Bihar became more desperate to suppress the agitation. Stop selling agricultural implements such as ploughs, yokes and ladders in markets and all public places. As a protest, the Lok Sewak Sangh took up a program to start selling agricultural implements in public for the sake of the farmers, which became known as the Hal Joal Satyagraha.

=== Tusu Satyagraha Andolan: 9 Jan – 8 Feb 1954 ===
When Satyagraha started under the leadership of Lok Sewak Sangh for the demand of Bengali language, the satyagrahis were attacked. The police resorted to lathi-charge and torture on women leaders at public meetings in Jhalda, Purulia and Santoori. As a result, public anger is created. They started Tusu Satyagraha on 9 January centered on Manbhum's local song, Tusu. This Satyagraha was organized in three phases: the first phase from 9 January to 19 January, the second phase from 20 January to 26 January and the third phase from 27 January to 8 February.

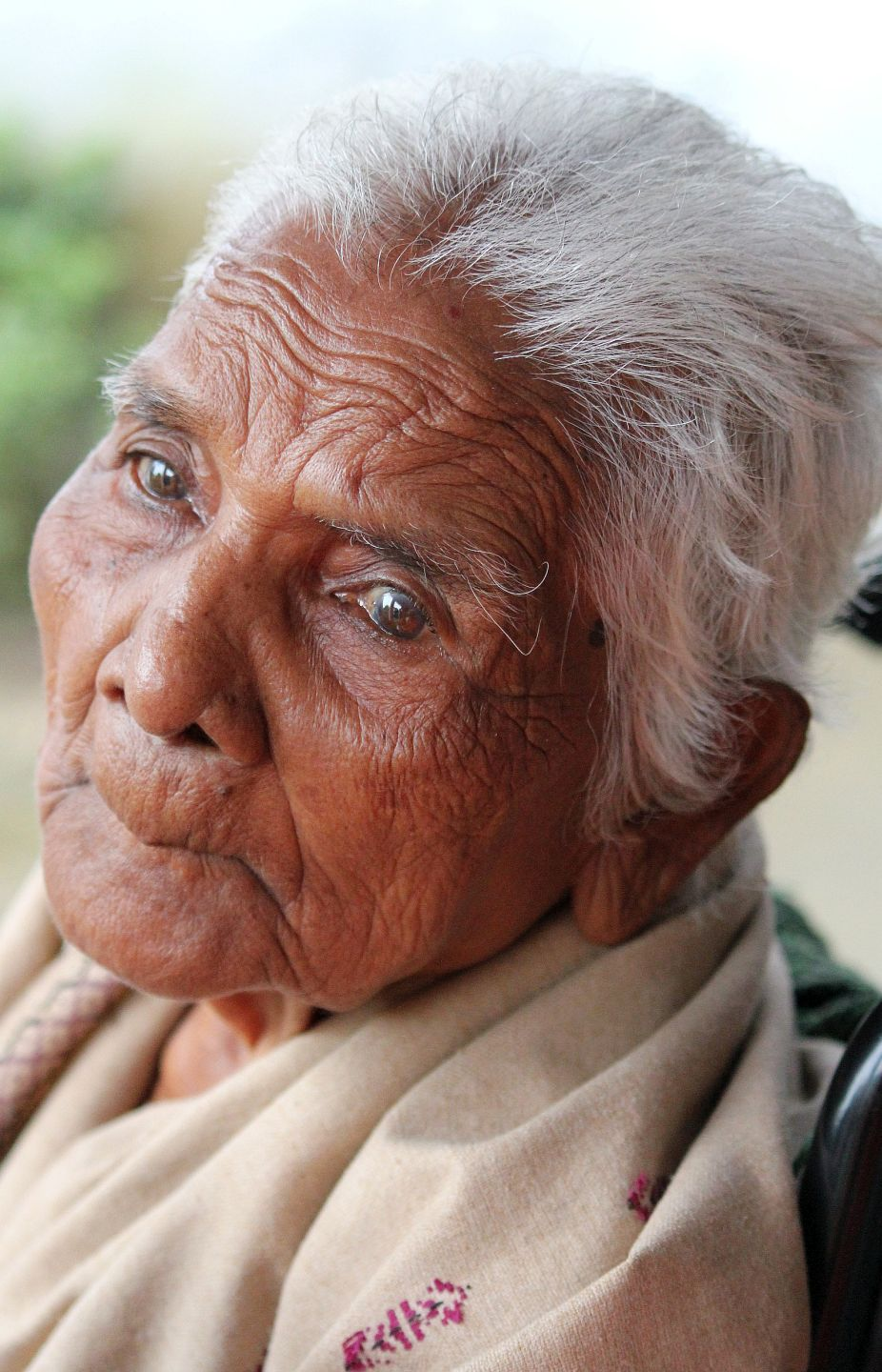
Bhabini Mahato, a freedom Fighter who participated in Bengali Language Movement (Manbhum)

Members of the Lok Sewak Sangh started Parikrama (circumambulation) in Raghunathpur city on January 9 under the leadership of Hemchandra Mahato as a form of protest. The Government of Bihar arrested 8 protesters on the pretext of Security Act. 11 protesters were arrested by the police while singing the Tusu song on January 10. On January 12, Atul Chandra Ghosh ordered the agitators to ignore government restrictions and sing the Tusu song across Manbhum. After that Tusu Satyagraha spread in different parts of Manbhum. The Bar association, Purulia Municipality and Communist party also joined this agitation. The Government of Bihar then started filing cases against the activists. Labanya Prabha Ghosh and Bhajahari Mahato on January 22, Samarendranath Ojha, Kaliram Mahato and Bhabini Mahato were voluntarily imprisoned on January 25 as a protest against this incident.

At this time, protesting Tusu folk songs became very popular. From farmers-laborers to people of all professions, the tone of protest is expressed in Tusu songs. Meanwhile, the Bihar Police arrested 40 Satyagrahis of the Tusu team in February and March. Atul Chandra Ghosh, Labanya Prabha Ghosh, Bhajahari Mahato and many others were arrested. Police vandalized the Lok Sewak Sangh office in Madhupur village on March 11, and seized a large number of Tusu song books. Besides, under the leadership of the Sub Deputy Magistrate, Satyagrahis' houses were vandalized and looted in Pitdari village of Manbazar on March 21. Purposeful lies and misinformation are perpetrated against the Bengalis of Manbhum.

Thousands of Bengali people of Manbhum district protested and were imprisoned by singing songs written by Bhajahari Mahato. Two popular Tusu songs are represented in the table below –

Bengali	Romanisation of Bengali	English translation
শুন বিহারী ভাই তোরা রাখতে লারবি ডাঙ দেখাই। তোরা আপন তরে ভেদ বাড়ালি, বাংলা ভাষায় দিলি ছাই।	Shun Bihari-bhai, Tora Rakhte Larbi Dang Dekhai. Tora Apon Tore Bhed Barali, Bangla Bhashay Dili Chhai.	O Bihari-brothers; You cannot keep us in Bihar Showing sticks.
— Written by Bhajahari Mahato
বাংলা ভাষা প্রাণের ভাষা রে। মারবি তোরা কে তারে।। এই ভাষাতে কাজ চলছে সাত পুরুষের আমলে। এই ভাষাতেই মায়ের কোলে মুখ ফুটেছে মা বলে।।	Bangla bhasha praner bhashare Marbi tora ke tare Ei bhashatei kaj cholecche Saat purusher amole Ei bhasahatei mayer kole Mukh futecche ma bole	My Bangla, O the language of my soul Who dares to wipe you out It's this language that worked for us for seven generations And we gone to sleep in our mother's arms And called her Maa.
— Written by Arun Chandra Ghosh

=== The march: 1956 ===
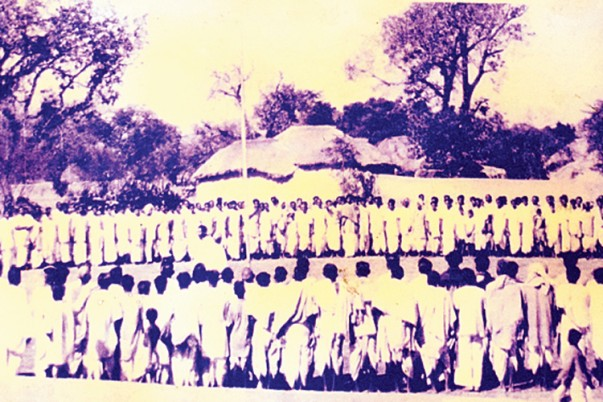
To protect the Bengali language, people stands for inclusion of Manbhum in West Bengal from Bihar at Pakbirra.

on 23 January 1956, Chief Minister of West Bengal Bidhan Chandra Roy and Chief Minister of Bihar Shri Krishna Singh proposed to merge both West Bengal and Bihar to form a new state called "Purba Pradesh". In the proposal, they said, Bengali and Hindi will be the central languages of the state. Apart from senior Congress leaders, Left parties also protested against this proposal. On 24 February, the resolution was passed in the Bihar Legislative Assembly amid a satyagraha movement against the resolution.

On 20 April 1956, thousands of people, led by Labanya Prabha Ghosh, Atul Chandra Ghosh and Nibaran Chandra Dasgupta started a march in favor of joining Manbhum with West Bengal and against the formation of "Purba Pradesh". The march starts at Pakbirra village in Puncha police station, and ends in Kolkata. Thousands of people joined the march with the Satyagrahis. Thousands of Satyagrahis and peoples sang Tusu song and Banglar Mati Banglar Jol (written by Rabindranath Tagore) in the march.

The march

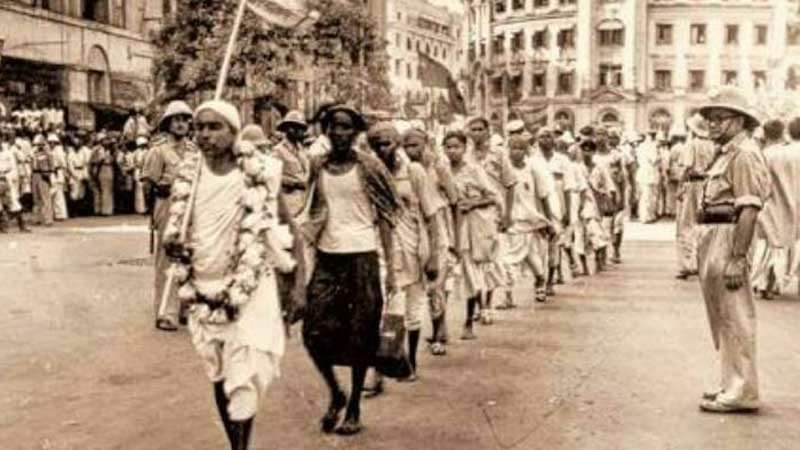
The march led by Lok Sewak Sangh is proceeding through Howrah city.

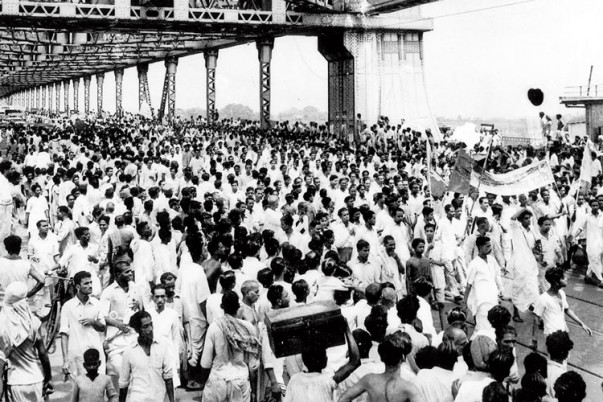
Manbhum Bangla Bengali Movement march crossing Howrah Bridge.

On 6 May, After marching 300 kilometers from Pakbirra village for 17 consecutive days, a procession of thousands of people along with Satyagrahis reached Kolkata Via Bankura, Beliatore, Sonamukhi, Patsair, Khandhghosh, Burdwan, Pandua, Magra, Chunchura, Chandannagar, Srirampur and Howrah. The police arrested the Satyagrahis as soon as they reached Kolkata. On 7 May Mahakaran, official secretariat building of the state government of West Bengal, was besieged by satyagrahis, and 965 satyagrahis were voluntarily imprisoned. After about 12 days in jail, they were released.

== Post Movement Effect ==
As an effect of this agitation a commission named "State Reorganization Commission" was set up by the Central government on 23 December 1953. The Commission held hearing in Manbhum district on 5 February 1955 and submitted its report on 10 October 1955. In its report the commission proposed the formation of a new district "Purulia", primarily dominated by Bengali speaking people to West Bengal from erstwhile Manbhum district of Bihar. Subsequently, the proposal to merge West Bengal with Bihar was withdrawn. The "Bengal-Bihar Border Boundary" Bill was passed in the Parliament on 17 August 1956, and in the Rajya Sabha on 28 August 1956. The new Purulia district comprised 19 police stations from the then Manbhum district. But as a special request from TISCO the then chief minister of West Bengal, Dr. Bidhan Chndra Roy gave consent for accession of three police stations (Patamda, Ichagarh and Chandil) to the Bihar. After bifurcation of Bihar, those three region became part of Jharkhand state.

On 1 November 1956 with 16 police stations covering 2,007 square miles (5,200 km^{2}) area and with a population of 1,169,097 the new district Purulia was acceded to West Bengal.

== See also ==
- Bengali language movement in India
- Bengali language movement in Bangladesh
- Labanya Prabha Ghosh
