= Sindhanur Assembly constituency =

Legislative Assembly constituency in Karnataka State, India

Coordinates: 15.77°N 76.76°E

Sindhanur
- Constituency No. 58 for the Karnataka Legislative Assembly

Constituency details
- Country: India
- Region: South India
- State: Karnataka
- District: Raichur
- Lok Sabha constituency: Koppal
- Established: 1951
- Total electors: 239,285
- Reservation: None

Member of Legislative Assembly
- 16th Karnataka Legislative Assembly
- Incumbent Hampanagouda Badarli
- Party: Indian National Congress
- Elected year: 2023
- Preceded by: Venkatrao Nadagouda

Sindhanur Assembly constituency is one of the 224 Legislative Assembly constituencies of Karnataka in India.

It is part of Raichur district. Hampanagouda Badarli is the current MLA from Sindhanur.

== Members of the Legislative Assembly ==
Election	Member	Party
1952	Shiv Basan Gowda	Independent politician
1957	Baswantrao Bassanagouda	Indian National Congress
1962	Baswantrao Bassanagouda	Indian National Congress
1967	A. Channanagowda	Independent politician
1972	Baswantrao Bassanagouda	Indian National Congress
1978	Narayanappa Hanumanthappa	Indian National Congress
1983	Mal. Lappa	Independent politician
1985	R. Narayanappa	Indian National Congress
1989	Hampanagouda Badarli	Janata Dal
1994	K. Virupaxappa	Indian National Congress
1999	Hampanagouda Badarli	Janata Dal
2004	Hampanagouda Badarli	Indian National Congress
2008	Venkata Rao Nadagouda	Janata Dal
2013	Hampanagouda Badarli	Indian National Congress
2018	Venkata Rao Nadagouda	Janata Dal
2023	Hampanagouda Badarli	Indian National Congress

== Election results ==
=== Assembly Election 2023 ===
2023 Karnataka Legislative Assembly election : Sindhanur
Party	Candidate	Votes	%	±%
INC	Hampanagouda Badarli	73,645	41.98%	▼0.79
BJP	K. Kariyappa	51,703	29.48%	▲20.43
JD(S)	Venkata Rao Nadagouda	43,461	24.78%	▼18.97
KRPP	Mallikarjun Nekkanti	2,147	1.22%	New
AAP	Sangram Narayan Killed	1,388	0.79%	New
NOTA	None of the above	1,065	0.61%	▼0.21
Margin of victory		21,942	12.51%	▲11.53
Turnout		175,523	73.35%	▲3.56
Total valid votes		175,412		
Registered electors		239,285		▲2.03
INC gain from JD(S)		Swing	▼1.77	

=== Assembly Election 2018 ===
2018 Karnataka Legislative Assembly election : Sindhanur
Party	Candidate	Votes	%	±%
JD(S)	Venkata Rao Nadagouda	71,514	43.75%	▲14.53
INC	Hampanagouda Badarli	69,917	42.77%	▼3.78
BJP	Kolla Sheshagirirao	14,795	9.05%	▼0.94
NOTA	None of the above	1,344	0.82%	New
JD(U)	Dr. Jalaluddin Akbar	1,240	0.76%	New
Margin of victory		1,597	0.98%	▼11.33
Turnout		163,676	69.79%	▼2.85
Total valid votes		163,464		
Registered electors		234,521		▲17.27
JD(S) gain from INC		Swing	▼2.80	

=== Assembly Election 2013 ===
2013 Karnataka Legislative Assembly election : Sindhanur
Party	Candidate	Votes	%	±%
INC	Hampanagouda Badarli	49,213	46.55%	▲12.30
BSRCP	K. Kariyappa	36,197	34.24%	New
JD(S)	Venkata Rao Nadagouda	30,895	29.22%	▼18.18
KJP	Rajashekhar Patil	11,692	11.06%	New
BJP	Kolla Sheshagirirao	10,557	9.99%	▼0.08
Independent	Ramanna Elekudalagi	1,176	1.11%	New
CPI	Bashumiya	997	0.94%	New
CPI(ML) Red Star	A. Ramesh Patil Bergi	868	0.82%	New
Margin of victory		13,016	12.31%	▼0.84
Turnout		145,271	72.64%	▲13.99
Total valid votes		105,728		
Registered electors		199,977		▲3.66
INC gain from JD(S)		Swing	▼0.85	

=== Assembly Election 2008 ===
2008 Karnataka Legislative Assembly election : Sindhanur
Party	Candidate	Votes	%	±%
JD(S)	Venkata Rao Nadagouda	53,621	47.40%	▲26.22
INC	Hampanagouda Badarli	38,747	34.25%	▼21.01
BJP	R. Narayanappa	11,394	10.07%	▼7.69
Independent	Sabir Pasha Maski	2,608	2.31%	New
Independent	Yogappa	1,227	1.08%	New
BSP	K. Mariyappa	1,219	1.08%	New
Rashtriya Hindustan Sena Karnataka	Jayanandayya Swamy	956	0.85%	New
Independent	Ramana Eralagaddi	897	0.79%	New
Independent	Maremma Sukalpet	684	0.60%	New
Margin of victory		14,874	13.15%	▼20.93
Turnout		113,143	58.65%	▼5.68
Total valid votes		113,123		
Registered electors		192,915		▼13.29
JD(S) gain from INC		Swing	▼7.86	

=== Assembly Election 2004 ===
2004 Karnataka Legislative Assembly election : Sindhanur
Party	Candidate	Votes	%	±%
INC	Hampanagouda Badarli	79,001	55.26%	▲8.48
JD(S)	Hanumanagouda Amareshappagouda	30,277	21.18%	New
BJP	Dr. Bhaskar Rao	25,392	17.76%	New
JP	Shailaja Prabhakar	2,721	1.90%	New
Independent	Badiger. H. N	2,477	1.73%	New
Kannada Nadu Party	Dr. Basavaraj Bennur	2,102	1.47%	New
Independent	Garapati Venkataratnam	994	0.70%	New
Margin of victory		48,724	34.08%	▲29.76
Turnout		143,124	64.33%	▼3.24
Total valid votes		142,964		
Registered electors		222,492		▲14.15
INC gain from JD(U)		Swing	▲4.16	

=== Assembly Election 1999 ===
1999 Karnataka Legislative Assembly election : Sindhanur
Party	Candidate	Votes	%	±%
JD(U)	Hampanagouda Badarli	64,853	51.10%	New
INC	K. Virupakshappa	59,367	46.78%	▲4.82
Independent	Huligeppa Badiger	930	0.73%	New
CPI	Bashumiya	815	0.64%	New
Margin of victory		5,486	4.32%	▲3.96
Turnout		131,707	67.57%	▼4.51
Total valid votes		126,917		
Rejected ballots		4,729	3.59%	▲1.07
Registered electors		194,916		▲11.76
JD(U) gain from INC		Swing	▲9.14	

=== Assembly Election 1994 ===
1994 Karnataka Legislative Assembly election : Sindhanur
Party	Candidate	Votes	%	±%
INC	K. Virupaxappa	51,415	41.96%	▲10.77
JD	Hampanagouda Badarli	50,968	41.59%	▼18.17
KRRS	Hanumangouda	16,422	13.40%	New
BJP	Sharanegouda Ragalparvi	1,615	1.32%	New
Margin of victory		447	0.36%	▼28.21
Turnout		125,718	72.08%	▲5.81
Total valid votes		122,539		
Rejected ballots		3,167	2.52%	▼3.38
Registered electors		174,405		▲9.63
INC gain from JD		Swing	▼17.80	

=== Assembly Election 1989 ===
1989 Karnataka Legislative Assembly election : Sindhanur
Party	Candidate	Votes	%	±%
JD	Hampanagouda Badarli	59,285	59.76%	New
INC	R. Narayanappa	30,940	31.19%	▼20.80
Kranti Sabha	Hamumanagoudaamareshgouda	5,294	5.34%	New
JP	Bangi Bheemappa	1,770	1.78%	New
Independent	Premraj Jain Huliseth	686	0.69%	New
Margin of victory		28,345	28.57%	▲24.59
Turnout		105,428	66.27%	▲0.27
Total valid votes		99,204		
Rejected ballots		6,224	5.90%	▲2.84
Registered electors		159,082		▲26.83
JD gain from INC		Swing	▲7.77	

=== Assembly Election 1985 ===
1985 Karnataka Legislative Assembly election : Sindhanur
Party	Candidate	Votes	%	±%
INC	R. Narayanappa	41,723	51.99%	▲6.73
JP	M. Mallappa	38,527	48.01%	▲44.43
Margin of victory		3,196	3.98%	▼0.17
Turnout		82,781	66.00%	▲5.49
Total valid votes		80,250		
Rejected ballots		2,531	3.06%	▼0.01
Registered electors		125,427		▲30.07
INC gain from Independent		Swing	▲2.59	

=== Assembly Election 1983 ===
1983 Karnataka Legislative Assembly election : Sindhanur
Party	Candidate	Votes	%	±%
Independent	Mal. Lappa	27,942	49.40%	New
INC	R. Narayanappa	25,596	45.26%	▲12.71
JP	Gurupadswamy	2,026	3.58%	▼20.41
Independent	Premraj	725	1.28%	New
Margin of victory		2,346	4.15%	▼0.44
Turnout		58,347	60.51%	▼10.99
Total valid votes		56,558		
Rejected ballots		1,789	3.07%	▼1.38
Registered electors		96,431		▲13.63
Independent gain from INC(I)		Swing	▲12.26	

=== Assembly Election 1978 ===
1978 Karnataka Legislative Assembly election : Sindhanur
Party	Candidate	Votes	%	±%
INC(I)	Narayanappa Hanumanthappa	21,536	37.14%	New
INC	Amare Gouda Channan Gouda	18,875	32.55%	▼25.99
JP	S. B. Bheemappa Kanakappa	13,912	23.99%	New
Independent	Premraj Muta Khanmal	2,216	3.82%	New
Independent	Sagayya Karibassayya	1,441	2.49%	New
Margin of victory		2,661	4.59%	▼12.49
Turnout		60,679	71.50%	▲8.44
Total valid votes		57,980		
Rejected ballots		2,699	4.45%	▲4.45
Registered electors		84,863		▲15.59
INC(I) gain from INC		Swing	▼21.40	

=== Assembly Election 1972 ===
1972 Mysore State Legislative Assembly election : Sindhanur
Party	Candidate	Votes	%	±%
INC	Baswantrao Bassanagouda	25,599	58.54%	▲22.93
CPI(M)	Amare Gouda Channan Gouda	18,130	41.46%	New
Margin of victory		7,469	17.08%	▼11.70
Turnout		46,296	63.06%	▼7.15
Total valid votes		43,729		
Registered electors		73,415		▲31.55
INC gain from Independent		Swing	▼5.85	

=== Assembly Election 1967 ===
1967 Mysore State Legislative Assembly election : Sindhanur
Party	Candidate	Votes	%	±%
Independent	A. Channanagowda	23,389	64.39%	New
INC	B. R. Basangouda	12,936	35.61%	▼15.86
Margin of victory		10,453	28.78%	▲25.84
Turnout		39,180	70.21%	▲19.05
Total valid votes		36,325		
Registered electors		55,807		▼10.92
Independent gain from INC		Swing	▲12.92	

=== Assembly Election 1962 ===
1962 Mysore State Legislative Assembly election : Sindhanur
Party	Candidate	Votes	%	±%
INC	Baswantrao Bassanagouda	15,073	51.47%	▲3.37
Lok Sewak Sangh	Amaregouda	14,212	48.53%	New
Margin of victory		861	2.94%	▼11.89
Turnout		32,053	51.16%	▲7.06
Total valid votes		29,285		
Registered electors		62,651		▲13.09
INC hold		Swing	▲3.37	

=== Assembly Election 1957 ===
1957 Mysore State Legislative Assembly election : Sindhanur
Party	Candidate	Votes	%	±%
INC	Baswantrao Bassanagouda	11,752	48.10%	▲22.47
Independent	Amaregouda	8,129	33.27%	New
Independent	Bassappa	3,503	14.34%	New
Independent	Shadaksharswami	1,049	4.29%	New
Margin of victory		3,623	14.83%	▼24.54
Turnout		24,433	44.10%	▼0.74
Total valid votes		24,433		
Registered electors		55,399		▲5.15
INC gain from Independent		Swing	▼16.90	

=== Assembly Election 1952 ===
1952 Hyderabad State Legislative Assembly election : Sindhanur
Party	Candidate	Votes	%	±%
Independent	Shiv Basan Gowda	15,358	65.00%	New
INC	Janardan Rao	6,056	25.63%	New
Independent	Siddaramappa	1,514	6.41%	New
Independent	Basamma Sheran Basaw Raj	699	2.96%	New
Margin of victory		9,302	39.37%	
Turnout		23,627	44.84%	
Total valid votes		23,627		
Registered electors		52,687		
Independent win (new seat)				

== See also ==
- List of constituencies of the Karnataka Legislative Assembly
- Raichur district
