= Halappa Achar =

Indian politician

Halappa Basappa Achar

Minister of Mines & Geology Government of Karnataka
- In office 4 August 2021 – 13 May 2023
- Chief Minister: Basavaraj Bommai
- Preceded by: Murugesh Nirani

Minister of Women & Child Development Government of Karnataka
- In office 4 August 2021 – 13 May 2023
- Chief Minister: Basavaraj Bommai
- Preceded by: Shashikala Annasaheb Jolle
- Succeeded by: Lakshmi Hebbalkar

Member of Karnataka Legislative Assembly
- In office 2018 – 13 May 2023
- Preceded by: Basavaraj Rayareddy
- Constituency: Yelburga

Member of Karnataka Legislative Council
- In office 6 January 2010 – 5 January 2016
- Preceded by: H. R. Srinath
- Succeeded by: Basavaraj Patil Itagi
- Constituency: Raichur Locoal Authorities

Personal details
- Born: 1 December 1952 (age 73) Yelburga, Mysore State (present-day Karnataka), India
- Party: Bharatiya Janata Party
- Spouse: Smt. Ratnamma (m. 1970)
- Education: Karnatak University (BSc)
- Occupation: Politician

Halappa Basappa Achar (born 1 December 1952) is an Indian politician who has served as the Cabinet Minister of Mines and Geology, Minister of Women and Child Development, and Minister of Disabled and Senior Citizens Empowerment for the Government of Karnataka since 4 August 2021. He was the in-charge minister of Dharwad District and a member of the Karnataka Legislative Assembly, representing the Yelburga constituency.

He was previously elected as a Member of Karnataka Legislative Council from the Raichur Assembly constituency in 2010.

== Early life and education ==
Halappa Achar was born on 1 December 1952 to Shri Basappa Shivappa Achar and Smt. Gauramma Basappa Achar. He graduated with a BSc and pursued agriculture.

== Career ==
He was elected as Director of Masaba Hanchinal Cooperative Bank in 1976. He entered politics by becoming vice-chairman of TAPCMS in Yelburga in 1978.

=== Sahakara Ratna ===
Halappa Achar took over as Director of RDCC Bank in 1988–89, rescuing it from near bankruptcy. Recognizing his efforts in resurrecting the bank, the Karnataka government, led by then-CM HD Kumaraswamy, honored him with the Sahakara Ratna award.

=== Elected as MLC ===
He was elected as an MLC in 2010 on a BJP ticket and emerged victorious with the highest margin of 400 votes in total. He represented the Raichur and Koppal districts for six years.

He successfully utilized his MLCLAD funds to implement minor irrigation projects in his constituency. In 2013 he succeeded in securing a sanction of Rs. 1,000 crore for the Yelburga Bevuru irrigation project from the then Chief Minister, Shri Jagadeesh Shetter.

=== As President of Karnataka State Cooperative Marketing Federation ===
When he took over as President of the Karnataka State Cooperative Marketing Federation in 2011 the institution was facing bankruptcy and owed Rs. 36 crore to the government. Achar revived the institution and continued as President of the board for seven years. Under his leadership, the institution repaid all of its outstanding debts and became independent, achieving a profit of Rs. 35 crore by the end of his tenure.

=== As Director of IFFCO and Apex Bank ===
With his experience in the field, he served as Director of IFFCO and Apex Bank for 10 years. He was also President of the Hampi Foundation Authority Trust from 2012–2013 to 2014–2015.

=== Public Service ===
He has been arranging free coaching in Kuknoor, Hirevankalakunta, and Masaba Hanchinal for poor children to prepare them for Navodaya, Sainik School, Kittur Rani Chennamma School, and various other entrance exams.

=== Member of Legislative Assembly ===
In the 2018 election, he defeated former Congress Minister Basavaraj Rayareddy by 13,000 votes, marking his debut appearance in the Assembly.

As Minister for Women and Child welfare, he worked closely with researchers at the Edward & Cynthia Institute of Public Health to implement the End Malnutrition Initiative in his constituency.
