= Labanya Prabha Ghosh =

Indian politician (1897–2003)

- Born: 14 August 1897
- Died: 11 April 2003; Shilpashram, Purulia, West Bengal, India
- Other names: Manbhum Janani
- Known for: Freedom Fighter
- Children: Arun Chandra Ghosh; Urmila Majumder+ Amal Chandra Ghosh

Labanya Prabha Ghosh (14 August 1897 – 11 April 2003), also called Labanya Devi, a Gandhian, was a prominent personality of the Indian freedom movement, from Purulia District of West Bengal. She lived for almost 106 years and during later part of her life, was forced to live in a poverty-stricken ashram, her only source of income being a pension paid for freedom fighters. All through her life, before and after independence of India, she fought for justice of common man.

== Early life and freedom fighter ==
She was born on 14 August 1897 and was popularly known as "Manbhum Janani" (Mother of Manbhum district). In 1908, at the age of 11, she was married to Atul Chandra Ghosh, another important personality of Indian freedom movement from Purulia district. She never went to school but was taught by her father. Her father, Risi Nabarun Chandra was also a freedom fighter, who along with his son-in-law, established "Shilpashram", at Telkalpara, Purulia, which was a place of gathering for several freedom fighters including Subhas Chandra Bose, Chittaranjan das and on certain occasions, Mahatma Gandhi also visited this ashram. She was the first woman MLA from Purulia who was elected representing Lok sevak Sangha. She was an active member of "Shilpashram", an important center of freedom struggle movement of Manbhum region. She wrote several article in Mukti, a weekly periodical established by her husband at Purulia and she continued as editor of the periodical after his death in 1961. She was a leading lady for several protests in Purulia during British Raj and she was recognised as an important freedom fighter of the area. Her son Arun Chandra Gosh and daughter Urmila Majumdar were also freedom fighters and lived with her in Shilpashrama, Purulia.

== Salt March ==
She played a major role in Salt March (1930) and Pataka Satyagraha (1945) and was arrested several times by British Government. She also undertook individual Satyagraha and was arrested by British during 1941. Labanya Prabha Ghosh along with her daughter Kamala Ghosh organised protest in Shilpa Ashrama, Purulia as a part of Quit India movement called by Mahatma Gandhi during 1942 and both were arrested.

After India's Independence, she participated in Bhasa Andolon in Bihar, for which she was arrested and later, because of this agitation, Purulia was separated from Bihar and merged with West Bengal on linguistic lines. Again, in emergency period, she was arrested during 1975.

She died on 11 April 2003 at the age of 106.

== Recognitions ==
- She was felicitated by Sunil Gangopadhyay in February 2003, on behalf of Bhasha Sahid Smarak Samity for her Contribution to the language movement (Bhasa Andolon).

== See also ==
- Atul Chandra Ghosh
- Bhasa Andolon
