= K. Rajashekar Basavaraj Hitnal =

Indian politician

K. Rajashekhar Basavraj Hitnal

Member of Parliament, Lok Sabha
- Incumbent
- Assumed office 4 June 2024
- Preceded by: Karadi Sanganna Amarappa
- Constituency: Koppal

Personal details
- Born: 1 June 1979 (age 47) Hospet
- Party: Indian National Congress
- Spouse: Rashmi (m. 20 March 2006)
- Parent(s): Basavaraj Kuyyappanavar, Basamma
- Relatives: K. Raghavendra Hitnal (brother)

K. Rajashekar Basavaraj Hitnal is an Indian politician and the elected candidate for Lok Sabha from Koppal Lok Sabha constituency. He is a member of the Indian National Congress. His brother K. Raghavendra Hitnal is a legislator representing Koppal assembly constituency.

== See also ==
- 18th Lok Sabha
- Indian National Congress
