= Lingsugur Assembly constituency =

Legislative Assembly constituency in Karnataka State, India

Coordinates: 16.16°N 76.52°E

Lingsugur
- Constituency No. 57 for the Karnataka Legislative Assembly

Constituency details
- Country: India
- Region: South India
- State: Karnataka
- District: Raichur
- Lok Sabha constituency: Raichur
- Established: 1951
- Total electors: 255,628
- Reservation: SC

Member of Legislative Assembly
- 16th Karnataka Legislative Assembly
- Incumbent Manappa D. Vajjal
- Party: Bharatiya Janata Party
- Elected year: 2023
- Preceded by: D. S. Hoolageri

Lingsugur Assembly constituency is one of the 224 Legislative Assembly constituencies of Karnataka in India.

It is part of Raichur district.

== Members of the Legislative Assembly ==
Election	Member	Party
1952	Basangouda	Indian National Congress
1957	Basangouda	Indian National Congress
1962	Linganna	Lok Sewak Sangh
1967	K. S. Paranagouda	Indian National Congress
1972	Chandrasekar. N. Patil	Indian National Congress
1978	Baswaraj Appagouda Timmangouda Anwari	Indian National Congress
1983	Baswaraj Appagouda Timmangouda Anwari	Indian National Congress
1985	Raja Amareshwara Naik	Janata Party
1989	Raja Amareshwara Naik	Indian National Congress
1994	Amaregouda Bayyapur Linganagouda Patli	Janata Dal
1999	Amaregouda Bayyapur Linganagouda Patli	Janata Dal
2004	Amaregouda Bayyapur Linganagouda Patli	Janata Dal
2008	Manappa D. Vajjal	Bharatiya Janata Party
2013	Manappa D. Vajjal	Janata Dal
2018	D. S. Hoolageri	Indian National Congress
2023	Manappa D. Vajjal	Bharatiya Janata Party

== Election results ==
=== Assembly Election 2023 ===
2023 Karnataka Legislative Assembly election : Lingsugur
Party	Candidate	Votes	%	±%
BJP	Manappa D. Vajjal	58,769	33.73%	▲4.86
INC	D. S. Hoolageri	55,960	32.12%	▼0.92
JD(S)	Bandi Shiddu	41,322	23.72%	▼6.30
KRPP	R. Rudraiah	13,764	7.90%	New
NOTA	None of the above	1,325	0.76%	▼0.50
BSP	Anilkumar D. Janappa Hirenaganoor	1,193	0.68%	New
UPP	Nagaraj Mothi	1,152	0.66%	New
Margin of victory		2,809	1.61%	▼1.40
Turnout		174,527	68.27%	
Total valid votes		174,238		
Registered electors		255,628		▲6.08
BJP gain from INC		Swing	▲0.69	

=== Assembly Election 2018 ===
2018 Karnataka Legislative Assembly election : Lingsugur
Party	Candidate	Votes	%	±%
INC	D. S. Hoolageri	54,230	33.04%	▲12.07
JD(S)	Bandi Shiddu	49,284	30.02%	▲8.16
BJP	Manappa D. Vajjal	47,385	28.87%	▲19.54
CPI(ML) Red Star	R. Manasayya	2,334	1.42%	▲0.57
NOTA	None of the above	2,074	1.26%	New
Independent	A. Balaswamy Kodli	2,056	1.25%	New
Indian New Congress Party	Hanumanta Karekallu	1,627	0.99%	New
Independent	Somalinga Dubari	1,359	0.83%	New
Independent	Shivaputra Chaluvadi	1,301	0.79%	New
Margin of victory		4,946	3.01%	▲2.12
Turnout		164,528	68.27%	▲2.76
Total valid votes		164,149		
Registered electors		240,984		▲21.78
INC gain from JD(S)		Swing	▲11.18	

=== Assembly Election 2013 ===
2013 Karnataka Legislative Assembly election : Lingsugur
Party	Candidate	Votes	%	±%
JD(S)	Manappa D. Vajjal	31,737	21.86%	▲17.13
INC	D. S. Hoolageri	30,451	20.97%	▼12.28
BSRCP	Siddu. Y. Bandi	25,005	17.22%	New
KJP	H. B. Murari	18,347	12.63%	New
BJP	T. R. Naik	13,545	9.33%	▼43.96
Independent	Dr. Ranganath	2,737	1.88%	New
CPI(ML) Red Star	Comrade Chinappa Kotriki	1,232	0.85%	New
Independent	Yashodhar Bhajantri	1,171	0.81%	New
Independent	Nandappa P. Bombaykar	1,101	0.76%	New
Margin of victory		1,286	0.89%	▼19.14
Turnout		129,627	65.51%	▲11.84
Total valid votes		145,208		
Registered electors		197,879		▲10.89
JD(S) gain from BJP		Swing	▼31.43	

=== Assembly Election 2008 ===
2008 Karnataka Legislative Assembly election : Lingsugur
Party	Candidate	Votes	%	±%
BJP	Manappa D. Vajjal	51,017	53.29%	New
INC	A. Vasanthkumar	31,837	33.25%	▼10.33
JD(S)	T. L. Nayak	4,532	4.73%	▼42.21
Independent	Comrad Shekharayya	2,457	2.57%	New
BSP	M. Swamy Durai	1,393	1.45%	▼1.44
Independent	Rajanikant Gurupadappa Lingasugur	1,331	1.39%	New
Independent	K. Babu	772	0.81%	New
SP	N. Padmavardhan	724	0.76%	New
LJP	Rangappa Lakshmayya Ganjalli	680	0.71%	New
Margin of victory		19,180	20.03%	▲16.67
Turnout		95,773	53.67%	▼7.60
Total valid votes		95,740		
Registered electors		178,453		▲4.27
BJP gain from JD(S)		Swing	▲6.35	

=== Assembly Election 2004 ===
2004 Karnataka Legislative Assembly election : Lingsugur
Party	Candidate	Votes	%	±%
JD(S)	Amaregowda Patil Bayyapur	49,211	46.94%	▲34.84
INC	Basavaraj Patil Anwari	45,692	43.58%	▲11.10
JD(U)	Sharanamma Kamaraddi	3,031	2.89%	▼33.06
BSP	Shankarappa Kabber	3,028	2.89%	New
Independent	Comrade Chinappa Kotriki	2,284	2.18%	New
Kannada Nadu Party	Mehaboob Ali. K	1,589	1.52%	New
Margin of victory		3,519	3.36%	▼0.11
Turnout		104,863	61.27%	▼1.88
Total valid votes		104,835		
Registered electors		171,147		▲15.90
JD(S) gain from JD(U)		Swing	▲10.99	

=== Assembly Election 1999 ===
1999 Karnataka Legislative Assembly election : Lingsugur
Party	Candidate	Votes	%	±%
JD(U)	Amaregouda Bayyapur Linganagouda	31,684	35.95%	New
INC	Basavaraj Patil Anwari	28,626	32.48%	▲6.47
Independent	Raja Amareshwara Naik	15,731	17.85%	New
JD(S)	Hanumanthappa Yamanappa Togari	10,661	12.10%	New
Independent	Shekarayya Husenappa	1,423	1.61%	New
Margin of victory		3,058	3.47%	▼13.20
Turnout		93,259	63.15%	▲2.83
Total valid votes		88,125		
Rejected ballots		5,132	5.50%	▲1.78
Registered electors		147,671		▲12.65
JD(U) gain from JD		Swing	▼6.72	

=== Assembly Election 1994 ===
1994 Karnataka Legislative Assembly election : Lingsugur
Party	Candidate	Votes	%	±%
JD	Amaregouda Linganagouda Patil	32,487	42.67%	▲2.95
INC	Raja Amareshwara Naik	19,799	26.01%	▼19.10
Independent	Amrappa Naik	13,690	17.98%	New
INC	Shankargouda Patil Amaravati	5,146	6.76%	New
BJP	M. Laxmikant Reddy Devendrappa Mannur	2,505	3.29%	New
KRRS	Siddalingezshwar Patil	1,662	2.18%	New
Independent	David Prem Kumar	505	0.66%	New
Margin of victory		12,688	16.67%	▲11.28
Turnout		79,076	60.32%	▲3.23
Total valid votes		76,132		
Rejected ballots		2,942	3.72%	▼3.12
Registered electors		131,094		▲10.55
JD gain from INC		Swing	▼2.44	

=== Assembly Election 1989 ===
1989 Karnataka Legislative Assembly election : Lingsugur
Party	Candidate	Votes	%	±%
INC	Raja Amareshwara Naik	28,450	45.11%	▲16.51
JD	M. A. Patil	25,051	39.72%	New
JP	N. Padmavardhan	4,321	6.85%	New
Kranti Sabha	Siddalingeshwar Gouda	2,981	4.73%	New
Independent	Veerabhadrappa	714	1.13%	New
Independent	Omerbin Ahmed	680	1.08%	New
Independent	M. Ganganna	584	0.93%	New
Margin of victory		3,399	5.39%	▼30.79
Turnout		67,702	57.09%	▼0.66
Total valid votes		63,074		
Rejected ballots		4,628	6.84%	▲3.96
Registered electors		118,585		▲33.80
INC gain from JP		Swing	▼19.68	

=== Assembly Election 1985 ===
1985 Karnataka Legislative Assembly election : Lingsugur
Party	Candidate	Votes	%	±%
JP	Raja Amareshwara Naik	32,207	64.79%	New
INC	K. Sanganagouda	14,219	28.60%	▼41.37
BJP	Ramachandrappa Geegeppa	1,754	3.53%	▼26.50
Independent	Shivarayappa Durgappa Hosamani	1,279	2.57%	New
Margin of victory		17,988	36.18%	▼3.75
Turnout		51,188	57.75%	▲2.96
Total valid votes		49,713		
Rejected ballots		1,475	2.88%	▼2.53
Registered electors		88,630		▲3.56
JP gain from INC		Swing	▼5.18	

=== Assembly Election 1983 ===
1983 Karnataka Legislative Assembly election : Lingsugur
Party	Candidate	Votes	%	±%
INC	Basavaraj Patil Anwari	31,034	69.97%	▲64.85
BJP	Ranghavendra Rao. D. K. Jagannath	13,321	30.03%	New
Margin of victory		17,713	39.93%	▲25.12
Turnout		46,893	54.79%	▼15.01
Total valid votes		44,355		
Rejected ballots		2,538	5.41%	▲0.79
Registered electors		85,582		▲9.62
INC gain from INC(I)		Swing	▲15.12	

=== Assembly Election 1978 ===
1978 Karnataka Legislative Assembly election : Lingsugur
Party	Candidate	Votes	%	±%
INC(I)	Baswaraj Appagouda Timmangouda Anwari	28,510	54.85%	New
JP	Raja Amareshwara Naik	20,809	40.03%	New
INC	Amergouda Malleshgouda Mattur	2,663	5.12%	▼57.84
Margin of victory		7,701	14.81%	▼13.17
Turnout		54,498	69.80%	▲19.39
Total valid votes		51,982		
Rejected ballots		2,516	4.62%	▲4.62
Registered electors		78,075		▲6.22
INC(I) gain from INC		Swing	▼8.11	

=== Assembly Election 1972 ===
1972 Mysore State Legislative Assembly election : Lingsugur
Party	Candidate	Votes	%	±%
INC	Chandrasekar. N. Patil	22,223	62.96%	▼4.70
INC(O)	Mallangouda Sangangouda	12,348	34.98%	New
Independent	Ramji Naik Ghanak Naik	725	2.05%	New
Margin of victory		9,875	27.98%	▼7.33
Turnout		37,051	50.41%	▼1.60
Total valid votes		35,296		
Registered electors		73,506		▲20.96
INC hold		Swing	▼4.70	

=== Assembly Election 1967 ===
1967 Mysore State Legislative Assembly election : Lingsugur
Party	Candidate	Votes	%	±%
INC	K. S. Paranagouda	20,024	67.66%	▲35.64
SWA	R. K. N. V. Naik	9,573	32.34%	▲20.72
Margin of victory		10,451	35.31%	▲10.98
Turnout		31,607	52.01%	▼1.04
Total valid votes		29,597		
Registered electors		60,769		▲26.49
INC gain from Lok Sewak Sangh		Swing	▲11.31	

=== Assembly Election 1962 ===
1962 Mysore State Legislative Assembly election : Lingsugur
Party	Candidate	Votes	%	±%
Lok Sewak Sangh	Linganna	13,289	56.35%	New
INC	Raja Kilcha Naik	7,551	32.02%	▼33.55
SWA	Ramjinaik	2,741	11.62%	New
Margin of victory		5,738	24.33%	▼14.59
Turnout		25,486	53.05%	▲8.72
Total valid votes		23,581		
Registered electors		48,044		▲10.21
Lok Sewak Sangh gain from INC		Swing	▼9.22	

=== Assembly Election 1957 ===
1957 Mysore State Legislative Assembly election : Lingsugur
Party	Candidate	Votes	%	±%
INC	Basangouda	12,672	65.57%	▼8.30
Independent	Shivshankar Rao Venkat Rao	5,151	26.65%	New
Independent	Bassanna	1,502	7.77%	New
Margin of victory		7,521	38.92%	▼17.31
Turnout		19,325	44.33%	▼1.70
Total valid votes		19,325		
Registered electors		43,593		▼18.59
INC hold		Swing	▼8.30	

=== Assembly Election 1952 ===
1952 Hyderabad State Legislative Assembly election : Lingsugur
Party	Candidate	Votes	%	±%
INC	Basangouda	18,208	73.87%	New
Independent	Koppresh Rao Desai	4,347	17.63%	New
Independent	Basamma Sheran Basaw Raj	2,095	8.50%	New
Margin of victory		13,861	56.23%	
Turnout		24,650	46.03%	
Total valid votes		24,650		
Registered electors		53,548		
INC win (new seat)				

== See also ==
- List of constituencies of the Karnataka Legislative Assembly
- Raichur district
