= Yelburga Assembly constituency =

Legislative Assembly constituency in Karnataka State, India

Coordinates: 15.61°N 76.01°E

Yelburga
- Constituency No. 63 for the Karnataka Legislative Assembly

Constituency details
- Country: India
- Region: South India
- State: Karnataka
- District: Koppal
- Lok Sabha constituency: Koppal
- Established: 1951
- Total electors: 182,472
- Reservation: None

Member of Legislative Assembly
- 16th Karnataka Legislative Assembly
- Incumbent Basavaraj Rayareddy
- Party: Indian National Congress
- Elected year: 2023
- Preceded by: Halappa Achar

Yelburga Assembly constituency is one of the 224 Legislative Assembly constituencies of Karnataka in India.

It is part of Koppal district.

== Members of the Legislative Assembly ==
Election	Member	Party
1952	Ayyangowda	Indian National Congress
1957	Alwandi Shankargouda	Indian National Congress
1962	Veerabhadrappa Irappa	Lok Sewak Sangh
1967	C. Gouda	Indian National Congress
1972	Prabhuraj. L. Patil	Indian National Congress
1978	Shrilingraj Shivashankar Rao	Indian National Congress
1983	Lingaraj Shivashankara Rao Desai	Indian National Congress
1983 By-election (Note: Died on 05/02/1983)	Subashchandra Basalingagouda Patil	Indian National Congress
1985	Basavaraj Rayareddy	Janata Party
1989	Basavaraj Rayareddy	Janata Dal
1994	Basavaraj Rayareddy	Janata Dal
1996 By-election (Note: Resigned on 27/05/1996)	Rudragouda Hunsihal	Janata Dal
1999	Shivasharanappa Gouda Patil	Indian National Congress
2004	Basavaraj Rayareddy	Indian National Congress
2008	Eshanna Gulagannavar	Bharatiya Janata Party
2013	Basavaraj Rayareddy	Indian National Congress
2018	Halappa Achar	Bharatiya Janata Party
2023	Basavaraj Rayareddy	Indian National Congress

== Election results ==
=== Assembly Election 2023 ===
2023 Karnataka Legislative Assembly election : Yelburga
Party	Candidate	Votes	%	±%
INC	Basavaraj Rayareddy	94,330	53.29%	▲13.36
BJP	Halappa Achar	77,149	43.59%	▼4.43
NOTA	None of the above	1,565	0.88%	▼0.04
Margin of victory		17,181	9.71%	▲1.62
Turnout		177,012	79.30%	▼0.23
Total valid votes		176,998		
Registered electors		223,211		▲7.71
INC gain from BJP		Swing	▲5.27	

=== Assembly Election 2018 ===
2018 Karnataka Legislative Assembly election : Yelburga
Party	Candidate	Votes	%	±%
BJP	Halappa Achar	79,072	48.02%	▲24.58
INC	Basavaraj Rayareddy	65,754	39.93%	▲5.33
JD(S)	Veeranagouda Police Patil Ballutagi	14,591	8.86%	▲0.91
NOTA	None of the above	1,510	0.92%	New
Margin of victory		13,318	8.09%	▼3.07
Turnout		164,804	79.53%	▲3.50
Total valid votes		164,667		
Registered electors		207,232		▲15.12
BJP gain from INC		Swing	▲13.42	

=== Assembly Election 2013 ===
2013 Karnataka Legislative Assembly election : Yelburga
Party	Candidate	Votes	%	±%
INC	Basavaraj Rayareddy	52,388	34.60%	▲6.50
BJP	Halappa Achar	35,488	23.44%	▼32.77
JD(S)	G. T. Pampapati	12,040	7.95%	▼1.00
BSRCP	Naveen Kumar. E. Gulagannanavar	10,640	7.03%	New
KJP	C. H. Patil	10,212	6.74%	New
Independent	Nagaraj Kolaji	9,888	6.53%	New
Independent	Somashekar. T. M	2,018	1.33%	New
Independent	Shivashankarayya Baligerimath	1,233	0.81%	New
Margin of victory		16,900	11.16%	▼16.94
Turnout		136,866	76.03%	▲9.60
Total valid votes		151,417		
Registered electors		180,009		▲12.79
INC gain from BJP		Swing	▼21.61	

=== Assembly Election 2008 ===
2008 Karnataka Legislative Assembly election : Yelburga
Party	Candidate	Votes	%	±%
BJP	Eshanna Gulagannavar	59,562	56.21%	▲14.34
INC	Basavaraj Rayareddy	29,781	28.10%	▼19.20
JD(S)	Amaragundappa Adappa Meti	9,482	8.95%	▲1.46
Independent	Shivappa Basappa Rampur	3,216	3.03%	New
BSP	Shankargouda Timmanagouda Malipatil	2,195	2.07%	New
Independent	Rudrappa Ramappa Bhandari	1,733	1.64%	New
Margin of victory		29,781	28.10%	▲22.67
Turnout		106,017	66.43%	▲1.64
Total valid votes		105,969		
Registered electors		159,599		▼1.03
BJP gain from INC		Swing	▲8.91	

=== Assembly Election 2004 ===
2004 Karnataka Legislative Assembly election : Yelburga
Party	Candidate	Votes	%	±%
INC	Basavaraj Rayareddy	49,401	47.30%	▲12.32
BJP	Eshanna Gulagannavar	43,729	41.87%	▲21.14
JD(S)	Channa Basangouda Halagin Gouda Police Patel	7,820	7.49%	▼6.35
Kannada Nadu Party	Manjunath Sorutur	3,498	3.35%	New
Margin of victory		5,672	5.43%	▲0.91
Turnout		104,489	64.79%	▲1.12
Total valid votes		104,448		
Registered electors		161,266		▲16.33
INC hold		Swing	▲12.32	

=== Assembly Election 1999 ===
1999 Karnataka Legislative Assembly election : Yelburga
Party	Candidate	Votes	%	±%
INC	Shivasharanappa Gouda Patil	28,706	34.98%	▼7.86
JD(U)	Halappa Achar	24,993	30.45%	New
BJP	Eshanna Gulagannavar	17,016	20.73%	▲9.67
JD(S)	Veeranagouda Shivashantagowda Police Patil	11,359	13.84%	New
Margin of victory		3,713	4.52%	▲1.26
Turnout		88,257	63.67%	▲1.03
Total valid votes		82,074		
Rejected ballots		6,137	6.95%	▲4.21
Registered electors		138,623		▲7.43
INC gain from JD		Swing	▼11.12	

=== Assembly By-election 1996 ===
1996 Karnataka Legislative Assembly by-election : Yelburga
Party	Candidate	Votes	%	±%
JD	Rudragouda Hunsihal	36,245	46.10%	▼14.05
INC	Shivasharanappa Gouda Patil	33,683	42.84%	▲23.29
BJP	Andappa Gurulingappa Somapur	8,692	11.06%	▲9.35
Margin of victory		2,562	3.26%	▼37.34
Turnout		80,832	62.64%	▼1.98
Total valid votes		78,620		
Rejected ballots		2,212	2.74%	▼0.55
Registered electors		129,034		▲2.73
JD hold		Swing	▼14.05	

=== Assembly Election 1994 ===
1994 Karnataka Legislative Assembly election : Yelburga
Party	Candidate	Votes	%	±%
JD	Basavaraj Rayareddy	47,215	60.15%	▲9.52
INC	Jayshree Subhashachandra Patil	15,347	19.55%	▼27.82
Independent	Sripadappa Neelappa Adhikari	10,170	12.96%	New
Independent	Bheemashappa Balappa Halli	2,327	2.96%	New
CPI(M)	Shivanagouda Banappa Goudra	1,411	1.80%	New
BJP	Amrutappa Sidramappa Desai	1,341	1.71%	New
Margin of victory		31,868	40.60%	▲37.35
Turnout		81,164	64.62%	▼2.82
Total valid votes		78,496		
Rejected ballots		2,668	3.29%	▼1.91
Registered electors		125,604		▲7.85
JD hold		Swing	▲9.52	

=== Assembly Election 1989 ===
1989 Karnataka Legislative Assembly election : Yelburga
Party	Candidate	Votes	%	±%
JD	Basavaraj Rayareddy	37,692	50.63%	New
INC	Shivasharanappa Gouda Adiveppa Gouda Patil	35,271	47.37%	▲3.60
JP	M. S. Patil (Vakilaru)	1,488	2.00%	New
Margin of victory		2,421	3.25%	▼6.53
Turnout		78,537	67.44%	▲8.33
Total valid votes		74,451		
Rejected ballots		4,086	5.20%	▲2.90
Registered electors		116,461		▲25.58
JD gain from JP		Swing	▼2.91	

=== Assembly Election 1985 ===
1985 Karnataka Legislative Assembly election : Yelburga
Party	Candidate	Votes	%	±%
JP	Basavaraj Rayareddy	28,674	53.54%	New
INC	Subashchandra Basalingagouda Patil	23,439	43.77%	New
Independent	Ashok Siddappa Mensinkai	816	1.52%	New
Independent	Shrinivas Ventakesh Vaidya	625	1.17%	New
Margin of victory		5,235	9.78%	
Turnout		54,815	59.11%	
Total valid votes		53,554		
Rejected ballots		1,261	2.30%	
Registered electors		92,738		
JP gain from INC				

=== Assembly By-election 1983 ===
1983 Karnataka Legislative Assembly by-election : Yelburga
Party	Candidate	Votes	%	±%
INC	Subashchandra Basalingagouda Patil			
INC hold		Swing	▼53.59	

=== Assembly Election 1983 ===
1983 Karnataka Legislative Assembly election : Yelburga
Party	Candidate	Votes	%	±%
INC	Lingaraj Shivashankara Rao Desai	23,387	53.59%	▲49.79
Independent	Shankar Rao Krishna Rao Deshpande	19,339	44.31%	New
Independent	Shivashankar Patil Alwawandi	914	2.09%	New
Margin of victory		4,048	9.28%	▼25.88
Turnout		45,715	52.67%	▼12.65
Total valid votes		43,640		
Rejected ballots		2,075	4.54%	▲0.53
Registered electors		86,792		▲6.58
INC gain from INC(I)		Swing	▼9.97	

=== Assembly Election 1978 ===
1978 Karnataka Legislative Assembly election : Yelburga
Party	Candidate	Votes	%	±%
INC(I)	Shrilingraj Shivashankar Rao	32,453	63.56%	New
JP	Shankarappa Siddappa	14,504	28.41%	New
INC	Desai. P. K	1,942	3.80%	▼66.35
Independent	Shripadappa Neelappa	1,708	3.35%	New
Independent	Channabasappa Honnappa	448	0.88%	New
Margin of victory		17,949	35.16%	▼9.13
Turnout		53,190	65.32%	▲17.19
Total valid votes		51,055		
Rejected ballots		2,135	4.01%	▲4.01
Registered electors		81,432		▲7.38
INC(I) gain from INC		Swing	▼6.59	

=== Assembly Election 1972 ===
1972 Mysore State Legislative Assembly election : Yelburga
Party	Candidate	Votes	%	±%
INC	Prabhuraj. L. Patil	24,430	70.15%	▲8.23
INC(O)	A. G. Virupakshagouda Patil	9,005	25.86%	New
Independent	Ajjayyaswamy Rudrayya	970	2.79%	New
ABJS	Shankarappa Bangarshettar	420	1.21%	New
Margin of victory		15,425	44.29%	▲18.43
Turnout		36,504	48.13%	▼14.16
Total valid votes		34,825		
Registered electors		75,837		▲12.17
INC hold		Swing	▲8.23	

=== Assembly Election 1967 ===
1967 Mysore State Legislative Assembly election : Yelburga
Party	Candidate	Votes	%	±%
INC	C. Gouda	24,256	61.92%	▲14.87
Independent	Veerabhadrappa	14,126	36.06%	New
Independent	A. Khaji	792	2.02%	New
Margin of victory		10,130	25.86%	▲19.96
Turnout		42,114	62.29%	▲10.59
Total valid votes		39,174		
Registered electors		67,607		▲6.12
INC gain from Lok Sewak Sangh		Swing	▲8.97	

=== Assembly Election 1962 ===
1962 Mysore State Legislative Assembly election : Yelburga
Party	Candidate	Votes	%	±%
Lok Sewak Sangh	Veerabhadrappa Irappa	16,104	52.95%	New
INC	Shankargouda Basangouda	14,310	47.05%	▼11.58
Margin of victory		1,794	5.90%	▼11.36
Turnout		32,938	51.70%	▼10.52
Total valid votes		30,414		
Registered electors		63,708		▲13.10
Lok Sewak Sangh gain from INC		Swing	▼5.68	

=== Assembly Election 1957 ===
1957 Mysore State Legislative Assembly election : Yelburga
Party	Candidate	Votes	%	±%
INC	Alwandi Shankargouda	20,548	58.63%	▲7.90
Independent	Sirur Veerabhadrappa	14,500	41.37%	New
Margin of victory		6,048	17.26%	▲15.79
Turnout		35,048	62.22%	▲9.92
Total valid votes		35,048		
Registered electors		56,328		▲8.94
INC hold		Swing	▲7.90	

=== Assembly Election 1952 ===
1952 Hyderabad State Legislative Assembly election : Yelburga
Party	Candidate	Votes	%	±%
INC	Ayyangowda	13,719	50.73%	New
Independent	Veerabhadrappa	13,322	49.27%	New
Margin of victory		397	1.47%	
Turnout		27,041	52.30%	
Total valid votes		27,041		
Registered electors		51,704		
INC win (new seat)				

== See also ==
- List of constituencies of the Karnataka Legislative Assembly
- Koppal district
