= K. Virupaxappa =

Indian politician

K. Virupakshappa

Member of parliament Lok Sabha
- In office 2004–2009
- Preceded by: H. G. Ramulu
- Succeeded by: Shivaramagouda Shivanagouda
- Constituency: Koppal

Personal details
- Born: 6 March 1942 (age 84) Sindhanur, Raichur District, Karnataka
- Party: INC
- Spouse: Kamalamma
- Children: 1 daughter
- As of 25 September, 2006

K. Virupakshappa (born 6 March 1942) is a member of the 14th Lok Sabha of India. He represents the Koppal constituency of Karnataka and is a member of the Indian National Congress (INC) political party.and Called as a criminal politician from Sindhanur taluk.

== Social And Cultural Activities ==
Started many associations for the cause of social justice to uplift the poor and the backwards in Raichur District; associated with many schools and colleges including hostels for the poor boys and girls

== Positions held ==
1960–1968 Municipal Councillor 1994-1999 Member, Karnataka Legislative Assembly 1996 onwards Vice President, Karnataka Pradesh Congress Committee 2004 Elected to 14th Lok Sabha & Member, Committee on Human Resource Development

== Some other positions ==
- Director, Vice President and President, Primary Land Development Co-operative Bank, Sindhanur, 1968–72
- President, (i) VSSN, Co-operative Bank, 1975–83; (ii) APMC, 1993–94; and (iii) Sri Kanakadasa Seva Sangha 1978 onwards
- State President, Kurubar Society; 1995–98
- District President, Kurubar Society, 1990–95; Director, Land Development Co-operative Society, 1978–80; chairman, TBP CADA, Munirabad, 2004
- Secretary, POIV Technic College, Rampur, Raichur, 1988–90
- Builder and President, Sri Kanakadas Pre University College, Primary and High School, Sindhanur
- Builder, Backward Community Hostel and Sangha started in 1978
- Member, APMC, 1968–78
