= K. Raghavendra Hitnal =

Indian politician

Member of Karnataka Legislative Assembly
- Incumbent
- Assumed office 8 May 2013
- Preceded by: Karadi Sanganna Amarappa
- Constituency: Koppal

Personal details
- Born: 1 June 1979 (age 47) Hitnal, Karnataka, India
- Party: Indian National Congress
- Parent: K. Basavraj Hitnal
- Relatives: K. Rajashekar Basavaraj Hitnal (brother)
- Education: Diploma
- Occupation: Politician, farmer

K. Raghavendra Hitnal (born 1 June 1979) is a politician from the state of Karnataka. He is a member of Indian National Congress. He won twice as MLA from Koppal assembly constituency.

== Personal life ==
He is the son of former politician K. Basavaraj Hitnal. He married Smt Rachana, and has a son and a daughter. His brother Rajasekhar Hitnal was elected to represent Koppal Lok Sabha constituency in 2024.

== Career ==
He is a close aide of chief minister Siddaramaiah. He contested in general assembly elections in 2013 & 2018 from Koppal and won the seat by defeating Karadi Sanganna Amarappa.
