= Kushtagi Assembly constituency =

Legislative Assembly constituency in Karnataka State, India

Coordinates: 15.76°N 76.19°E

Kushtagi
- Constituency No. 60 for the Karnataka Legislative Assembly

Constituency details
- Country: India
- Region: South India
- State: Karnataka
- District: Koppal
- Lok Sabha constituency: Koppal
- Established: 1951
- Total electors: 233,835
- Reservation: None

Member of Legislative Assembly
- 16th Karnataka Legislative Assembly
- Incumbent Doddangouda H. Patil
- Party: Bharatiya Janata Party
- Elected year: 2023
- Preceded by: Amaregowda Bayyapur

Kushtagi Assembly constituency is one of the 224 Legislative Assembly constituencies of Karnataka in India.

It is part of Koppal district.

== Members of the Legislative Assembly ==
Election	Member	Party
1952	Andanappa	Independent politician
1957	Pundlikappa Eswarappa	Indian National Congress
1962	Kata Rao	Lok Sewak Sangh
1967	Pundlikappa Eshwarappa	Indian National Congress
1972	Kantha Rao Bhim Rao Desai	Indian National Congress
1978	M. Ganganna Bheemappa	Indian National Congress
1983	Hanume Gowad Shekhargounda	Indian National Congress
1985	M. S. Patil	Janata Party
1989	Hanamagouda Sekhkargouda	Indian National Congress
1994	K. Sharnappa Advocate	Janata Dal
1999	Hasanasab Nabeesab Dotihal	Indian National Congress
2004	Doddanagouda Hanamagouda Patil	Bharatiya Janata Party
2008	Amaregouda Linganagouda Bayyapur	Indian National Congress
2013	Doddanagouda Hanamagouda Patil	Bharatiya Janata Party
2018	Amaregouda Linganagouda Bayyapur	Indian National Congress
2023	Doddanagouda Hanamagouda Patil	Bharatiya Janata Party

== Election results ==
=== Assembly Election 2023 ===
2023 Karnataka Legislative Assembly election : Kushtagi
Party	Candidate	Votes	%	±%
BJP	Doddanagouda Hanamagouda Patil	92,915	50.75	▲8.88
INC	Amaregouda Linganagouda Bayyapur	83,269	45.48	▼7.25
NOTA	None of the above	1,592	0.87	▼0.25
Independent	Vazeer B. Gonal	1,377	0.75	New
Margin of victory		9,646	5.27	▼5.59
Turnout		184,025	78.70	▲4.83
Total valid votes		183,082		
Registered electors		233,835		▲4.01
BJP gain from INC		Swing	▼1.98	

=== Assembly Election 2018 ===
2018 Karnataka Legislative Assembly election : Kushtagi
Party	Candidate	Votes	%	±%
INC	Amaregouda Linganagouda Bayyapur	87,566	52.73	▲22.48
BJP	Doddanagouda Hanamagouda Patil	69,535	41.87	▲9.38
JD(S)	H. C. Neeravari	4,002	2.41	▼17.30
NOTA	None of the above	1,867	1.12	New
Independent	Vazeer B. Gonal	1,152	0.69	New
Margin of victory		18,031	10.86	▲8.62
Turnout		166,070	73.87	▲2.06
Total valid votes		166,054		
Registered electors		224,827		▲16.03
INC gain from BJP		Swing	▲20.24	

=== Assembly Election 2013 ===
2013 Karnataka Legislative Assembly election : Kushtagi
Party	Candidate	Votes	%	±%
BJP	Doddanagouda Hanamagouda Patil	44,007	32.49	▲3.08
INC	Amaregouda Linganagouda Bayyapur	40,970	30.25	▼2.45
JD(S)	K. Sharanappa Vakeelaru	26,691	19.71	▼11.27
BSRCP	Gonal Rajashekar Gouda	17,543	12.95	New
Independent	Hiremath Sangamesh Shekarayya	1,743	1.29	New
Independent	Puradappa Kandgal Vakeelaru	1,496	1.10	New
KJP	Fakirappa Somappa Chalageri Vakeelaru	1,442	1.06	New
Independent	Laxmana Duragappa Talawar	955	0.71	New
BSP	Shivaputrappa Gumgeri	833	0.62	▼1.05
Margin of victory		3,037	2.24	▲0.52
Turnout		139,148	71.81	▲10.87
Total valid votes		135,446		
Registered electors		193,774		▲14.55
BJP gain from INC		Swing	▼0.21	

=== Assembly Election 2008 ===
2008 Karnataka Legislative Assembly election : Kushtagi
Party	Candidate	Votes	%	±%
INC	Amaregouda Linganagouda Bayyapur	33,699	32.70	▲11.20
JD(S)	K. Sharanappa Vakeelaru Kushtagi	31,929	30.98	▼0.01
BJP	Doddanagouda Hanamagouda Patil	30,313	29.41	▼10.52
Independent	Hiremath Sangamesh Shekarayya	2,234	2.17	New
BSP	Chetan Desai	1,724	1.67	▼0.03
JD(U)	Mallikarjunswamy Veerasangayya Hiremath	1,308	1.27	New
LJP	Shivakumar Navali Siddappa Tontapur	1,050	1.02	New
SKP	Mohamad Najirsab Mulimani	810	0.79	New
Margin of victory		1,770	1.72	▼7.22
Turnout		103,086	60.94	▲0.13
Total valid votes		103,067		
Registered electors		169,160		▼7.72
INC gain from BJP		Swing	▼7.23	

=== Assembly Election 2004 ===
2004 Karnataka Legislative Assembly election : Kushtagi
Party	Candidate	Votes	%	±%
BJP	Doddanagouda Hanamagouda Patil	44,492	39.93	▲26.52
JD(S)	K. Sharanappa Vakeelaru	34,526	30.99	▲2.04
INC	Hasanasab Nabisab Dotnal	23,960	21.50	▼25.73
JP	Parappa Kalagi	2,866	2.57	New
Independent	Basavaraj Narasappa Bilkar	2,009	1.80	New
BSP	Shivaputrappa Gumgeri	1,891	1.70	New
Kannada Nadu Party	Mahanthaswamiji Salimat Mudgal	1,678	1.51	New
Margin of victory		9,966	8.94	▼9.34
Turnout		111,475	60.81	▼1.10
Total valid votes		111,422		
Registered electors		183,314		▲20.16
BJP gain from INC		Swing	▼7.30	

=== Assembly Election 1999 ===
1999 Karnataka Legislative Assembly election : Kushtagi
Party	Candidate	Votes	%	±%
INC	Hasanasab Nabeesab Dotihal	41,200	47.23	▲18.33
JD(S)	K. Sharanappa Vakeelaru	25,256	28.95	New
BJP	Shyamarao Hire Gonnagar	11,701	13.41	▲8.74
KRRS	Channanagouda Virupaxagouda Mali Pateel	4,984	5.71	New
Independent	Hajibeg Driver Mudagal	2,266	2.60	New
Independent	Thavarasing Roopsing	1,832	2.10	New
Margin of victory		15,944	18.28	▼1.65
Turnout		94,443	61.91	▼2.31
Total valid votes		87,239		
Rejected ballots		7,179	7.60	▲4.74
Registered electors		152,555		▲10.69
INC gain from JD		Swing	▼1.60	

=== Assembly Election 1994 ===
1994 Karnataka Legislative Assembly election : Kushtagi
Party	Candidate	Votes	%	±%
JD	K. Sharnappa Advocate	41,972	48.83	▲3.55
INC	Hanamagouda Sekharagouda Patil	24,838	28.90	▼19.59
INC	Chandappa Dyamanna Tlawar	9,386	10.92	New
BJP	S. D. Sudheer	4,014	4.67	New
CPI(M)	R. K. Desai	2,723	3.17	New
Independent	M. Ganganna Bheemappa	2,390	2.78	New
BSP	S. Lingappa	635	0.74	New
Margin of victory		17,134	19.93	▲16.72
Turnout		88,503	64.22	▲0.35
Total valid votes		85,958		
Rejected ballots		2,528	2.86	▼2.86
Registered electors		137,816		▲11.02
JD gain from INC		Swing	▲0.34	

=== Assembly Election 1989 ===
1989 Karnataka Legislative Assembly election : Kushtagi
Party	Candidate	Votes	%	±%
INC	Hanamagouda Sekhkargouda	36,246	48.49	▲8.49
JD	K. Sharanappa	33,847	45.28	New
JP	Nagangouda Chandangouda Patil Beelagi	2,382	3.19	New
Independent	S. Lingappa	1,138	1.52	New
Kranti Sabha	K. Shamsunder Gurubasappa	899	1.20	New
Margin of victory		2,399	3.21	▼12.05
Turnout		79,279	63.87	▼0.77
Total valid votes		74,744		
Rejected ballots		4,535	5.72	▲3.09
Registered electors		124,132		▲31.20
INC gain from JP		Swing	▼6.77	

=== Assembly Election 1985 ===
1985 Karnataka Legislative Assembly election : Kushtagi
Party	Candidate	Votes	%	±%
JP	M. S. Patil	32,901	55.26	▲45.25
INC	Hanamagouda Sekharagouda Patil	23,816	40.00	▼20.08
Independent	Sharanappa Hanmappa Gatti	1,811	3.04	New
Independent	Hanmanthappa Dyavappa Mushtigori	1,013	1.70	New
Margin of victory		9,085	15.26	▼14.90
Turnout		61,152	64.64	▲16.01
Total valid votes		59,541		
Rejected ballots		1,611	2.63	▼2.35
Registered electors		94,610		▲5.25
JP gain from INC		Swing	▼4.82	

=== Assembly Election 1983 ===
1983 Karnataka Legislative Assembly election : Kushtagi
Party	Candidate	Votes	%	±%
INC	Hanume Gowad Shekhargounda	24,955	60.08	▲52.31
BJP	Turkani Sharbhendra Veerappa	12,426	29.91	New
JP	Parappa Avvanneppa	4,158	10.01	▼9.92
Margin of victory		12,529	30.16	▼7.26
Turnout		43,717	48.63	▼12.25
Total valid votes		41,539		
Rejected ballots		2,178	4.98	▲0.51
Registered electors		89,895		▲7.45
INC gain from INC(I)		Swing	▲2.72	

=== Assembly Election 1978 ===
1978 Karnataka Legislative Assembly election : Kushtagi
Party	Candidate	Votes	%	±%
INC(I)	M. Ganganna Bheemappa	27,908	57.36	New
JP	Vittappa Pampanna Kantli	9,699	19.93	New
Independent	Sharbanna Veerappa Turkani	7,015	14.42	New
INC	Deshpande Ram Rao Raghvendra Rao	3,779	7.77	▼48.11
Margin of victory		18,209	37.42	▲20.66
Turnout		50,934	60.88	▲2.24
Total valid votes		48,655		
Rejected ballots		2,279	4.47	▲4.47
Registered electors		83,660		▲13.11
INC(I) gain from INC		Swing	▲1.48	

=== Assembly Election 1972 ===
1972 Mysore State Legislative Assembly election : Kushtagi
Party	Candidate	Votes	%	±%
INC	Kantha Rao Bhim Rao Desai	23,144	55.88	▲3.90
INC(O)	B. Sharanabasvaraj	16,201	39.12	New
SWA	P. Chandalingappa	2,071	5.00	New
Margin of victory		6,943	16.76	▲12.79
Turnout		43,369	58.64	▲1.90
Total valid votes		41,416		
Registered electors		73,962		▲16.73
INC hold		Swing	▲3.90	

=== Assembly Election 1967 ===
1967 Mysore State Legislative Assembly election : Kushtagi
Party	Candidate	Votes	%	±%
INC	P. Eshwarappa	17,485	51.98	▲3.75
Independent	V. Rajappayya	16,150	48.02	New
Margin of victory		1,335	3.97	▲0.44
Turnout		35,950	56.74	▲1.23
Total valid votes		33,635		
Registered electors		63,359		▲10.33
INC gain from Lok Sewak Sangh		Swing	▲0.21	

=== Assembly Election 1962 ===
1962 Mysore State Legislative Assembly election : Kushtagi
Party	Candidate	Votes	%	±%
Lok Sewak Sangh	Kata Rao	15,233	51.77	New
INC	Pundalikappa	14,194	48.23	▼21.69
Margin of victory		1,039	3.53	▼36.32
Turnout		31,878	55.51	▲7.90
Total valid votes		29,427		
Registered electors		57,425		▲4.88
Lok Sewak Sangh gain from INC		Swing	▼18.15	

=== Assembly Election 1957 ===
1957 Mysore State Legislative Assembly election : Kushtagi
Party	Candidate	Votes	%	±%
INC	Pundlikappa Eswarappa	18,226	69.92	▲20.10
Independent	Basatappa Karbasappa	7,840	30.08	New
Margin of victory		10,386	39.85	▲39.50
Turnout		26,066	47.61	▼5.62
Total valid votes		26,066		
Registered electors		54,753		▲15.39
INC gain from Independent		Swing	▲19.74	

=== Assembly Election 1952 ===
1952 Hyderabad State Legislative Assembly election : Kushtagi
Party	Candidate	Votes	%	±%
Independent	Andanappa	12,674	50.18	New
INC	Raghuvenderchari	12,585	49.82	New
Margin of victory		89	0.35	
Turnout		25,259	53.23	
Total valid votes		25,259		
Registered electors		47,452		
Independent win (new seat)				

== See also ==
- List of constituencies of the Karnataka Legislative Assembly
- Koppal district
