= Atul Chandra Ghosh =

- Born: 1881; Khandaghosh, Burdwan
- Died: 1969
- Other names: Manbhum Keshari
- Education: Law
- Known for: Indian Independence Activist
- Spouse: Labanya Prabha Ghosh
- Children: Arun Chandra Ghosh Urmila Majumder Amal Chandra Ghosh

Atul Chandra Ghosh (1881–1969) was a prominent personality of the Indian freedom movement from Purulia district, West Bengal. Born at Khandaghosh of Burdwan, he passed law in 1908. He was the co-founder of "Shilpashram" (Rural Industry Development inside ashram) along with Nibaran Chandra Dasgupta. He was the chief architect of "Bangabhukti Andolon". He is famous in the title "Manbhum Keshari". He was active freedom fighter during British Raj and he left practicing the law and joined freedom struggle during non-cooperation movement. He was the editor of weekly Bengali newspaper "Mukti". His wife, Labanya Prabha Ghosh was also a freedom fighter and continued as editor of Mukti after his death.

== See also ==
- Labanya Prabha Ghosh
- Bhasa Andolon
