= Hampanagouda Badarli =

Indian politician (born 1950)

Hampanagouda Badarli (born 1950) is an Indian politician from Karnataka. He is a five time MLA from Sindhanur Assembly constituency which is in Raichur district. He won the 2023 Karnataka Legislative Assembly election representing Indian National Congress.

Hampanagouda Badarli was appointed as Chairman for Mysore Sales International Ltd in 2016 & Chairman for Karnataka State Industrial and Infrastructure Development (KSIIDC) on 26 January 2024.

== Early life and education ==
Badarli is from Sindhanur, Raichur district. His father Venkataraogouda was a farmer. He completed B.A. at Karnataka Collage, Darward in 1973.

== Career ==
Badarli won from Sindhanur Assembly constituency representing Indian National Congress in the 2023 Karnataka Legislative Assembly election. He polled 73,645 votes and defeated his nearest rival, K. Kariyappa of Bharatiya Janata Party, by a huge margin of 21,942 votes.

He became an MLA for the first time winning the 1989 Karnataka Legislative Assembly election representing Janata Dal and won again in 1999, 2004, 2013, and 2023 to become a five time MLA from Sindhanur Assembly constituency. In 2004, he joined Indian National Congress and defeated Hanumanagouda Amareshappagouda of Janata Dal (S) by a huge margin of 48,724 votes. He lost in 1994 against K. Virupakshappa of Indian National Congress by a narrow margin of 5486 votes, and against Nadagouda Venkatarao of JD (S) in 2008. In the 2013 Karnataka Legislative Assembly election, he represented Indian National Congress and defeated his nearest rival, K. Kariyappa of BSRC, by a margin of 13,016 votes.
