= Manappa D. Vajjal =

Member of the Legislative Assembly, Lingasugur

Manappa D.Vajjal

Member of Karnataka Legislative Assembly
- Incumbent
- Assumed office 2023
- Preceded by: D. S. Hoolageri
- Constituency: Lingasugur

Chairman of Hutti Gold Mines Limited
- In office 2020–2023

Member of Karnataka Legislative Assembly
- In office 2008–2018
- Preceded by: Amaregowda Patil Bayyapur
- Succeeded by: D. S. Hoolageri
- Constituency: Lingasugur

Personal details
- Born: 15 August 1963 (age 62) Gejjalagatta village in Lingasugur, Karnataka, India
- Party: Janata Dal (Secular) (2013 – 2018); Bharatiya Janata Party (2008 – present)
- Children: 3
- Education: SSLC

Manappa D. Vajjal (born August 15, 1963) is an Indian politician, currently serving as a Chairman of the Hutti Gold Mines Limited from Lingasugur constituency, since 2020. He is a member of the Bharatiya Janata Party.

== Early life ==
Manappa Vajjal was born to Dyavappa and Mudakamma in Gejjalagatta village in Lingasugur taluk on 15 August 1963.

== Political life ==
Vajjal won the 2008, 2013 and 2023 Karnataka Legislative Assembly election as a representative of the Lingsugur Assembly constituency.
