= Koppal Assembly constituency =

Legislative Assembly constituency in Karnataka State, India

Coordinates: 15.35°N 76.15°E

Koppal
- Constituency No. 64 for the Karnataka Legislative Assembly

Constituency details
- Country: India
- Region: South India
- State: Karnataka
- District: Koppal
- Lok Sabha constituency: Koppal
- Established: 1951
- Total electors: 254,021
- Reservation: None

Member of Legislative Assembly
- 16th Karnataka Legislative Assembly
- Incumbent K. Raghavendra Hitnal
- Party: Indian National Congress
- Elected year: 2018
- Preceded by: Karadi Sanganna Amarappa

Koppal Assembly constituency is one of the 224 Legislative Assembly constituencies of Karnataka in India.

It is part of Koppal district.

== Members of the Legislative Assembly ==
Election	Member	Party
1952	Mahadevamma Basan Gowda	Independent politician
1957	Mallikarjun Patil	Indian National Congress
1962	Malikarjungouda Sanganagouda	Indian National Congress
1967	Virupaxgouda	Indian National Congress
1972	M. Virupakshappa Shivappa	Indian National Congress
1978	Veeranna Pampanna Mudgal	Indian National Congress
1983	Diwatar Mallikarajun Basappa	Indian National Congress
1985	Agadi Virupakshappa Sanganna	Janata Party
1989	Diwatar Mallikarajun Basappa	Independent politician
1994	Karadi Sanganna Amarappa	Independent politician
1999	Karadi Sanganna Amarappa	Janata Dal
2004	Basavaraj Bhimappa Hitnal. K	Indian National Congress
2008	Karadi Sanganna Amarappa	Janata Dal
2011 By-election	Karadi Sanganna Amarappa	Bharatiya Janata Party
2013	K. Raghavendra Hitnal	Indian National Congress
2018	K. Raghavendra Hitnal	Indian National Congress
2023	K. Raghavendra Hitnal	Indian National Congress

== Election results ==
=== Assembly Election 2023 ===
2023 Karnataka Legislative Assembly election : Koppal
Party	Candidate	Votes	%	±%
INC	K. Raghavendra Hitnal	90,430	46.43	▼8.21
BJP	Karadi Manjula	54,170	27.82	▼12.25
JD(S)	C. V. Chandrashekar	45,369	23.30	▲20.99
NOTA	None of the above	1,317	0.68	▼0.12
Margin of victory		36,260	18.62	▲4.04
Turnout		195,047	76.78	▲1.73
Total valid votes		194,749		
Registered electors		254,021		▲5.39
INC hold		Swing	▼8.21	

=== Assembly Election 2018 ===
2018 Karnataka Legislative Assembly election : Koppal
Party	Candidate	Votes	%	±%
INC	K. Raghavendra Hitnal	98,783	54.64	▼7.13
BJP	Amaresh Sanganna Karadi	72,432	40.07	▼1.29
JD(S)	K. M. Syed	4,185	2.31	▼2.88
NOTA	None of the above	1,454	0.80	New
Margin of victory		26,351	14.58	▼5.83
Turnout		180,901	75.05	▲0.67
Total valid votes		180,782		
Registered electors		241,032		▲17.43
INC hold		Swing	▼7.13	

=== Assembly Election 2013 ===
2013 Karnataka Legislative Assembly election : Koppal
Party	Candidate	Votes	%	±%
INC	K. Raghavendra Hitnal	81,062	61.77	▲26.18
BJP	Karadi Sanganna Amarappa	54,274	41.36	▼3.51
JD(S)	Pradeep Virupakshagouda	6,811	5.19	▼10.20
KJP	K. M. Syed	4,118	3.14	New
BSRCP	Nekkanti Nagaraj	2,609	1.99	New
NCP	Shivakumar Vaderahalli	1,333	1.02	New
Margin of victory		26,788	20.41	▲11.13
Turnout		152,663	74.38	▲2.84
Total valid votes		131,227		
Registered electors		205,255		▲9.06
INC gain from BJP		Swing	▲16.90	

=== Assembly By-election 2011 ===
2011 Karnataka Legislative Assembly by-election : Koppal
Party	Candidate	Votes	%	±%
BJP	Karadi Sanganna Amarappa	60,405	44.87	▲25.71
INC	K. B. B. Hitanal	47,917	35.59	▲3.70
JD(S)	P. V. M. Kavaloorgoodra	20,719	15.39	▼25.18
Independent	H. S. S. Rayya	1,252	0.93	New
RPI	S. N. Patil	822	0.61	New
Margin of victory		12,488	9.28	▲0.60
Turnout		134,639	71.54	▲6.14
Total valid votes		134,620		
Registered electors		188,209		▲3.21
BJP gain from JD(S)		Swing	▲4.30	

=== Assembly Election 2008 ===
2008 Karnataka Legislative Assembly election : Koppal
Party	Candidate	Votes	%	±%
JD(S)	Karadi Sanganna Amarappa	48,372	40.57	▲35.99
INC	K. Basavaraj Bheemappa Hitnal	38,027	31.89	▼10.94
BJP	Andanappa Agadi	22,851	19.16	▼18.82
Independent	Kariyanna H. Sangati	2,571	2.16	New
Independent	Mallikarjun Nijagunappa Hadapad	2,331	1.95	New
BSP	Sangappa Kalakappa Vakkalad	2,062	1.73	New
SKP	J. M. Veerasangayya	1,210	1.01	New
Independent	K. B. Gonal	1,005	0.84	New
Independent	Abdul Gafar Bepari	814	0.68	New
Margin of victory		10,345	8.68	▲3.83
Turnout		119,249	65.40	▼0.95
Total valid votes		119,243		
Registered electors		182,348		▲9.69
JD(S) gain from INC		Swing	▼2.26	

=== Assembly Election 2004 ===
2004 Karnataka Legislative Assembly election : Koppal
Party	Candidate	Votes	%	±%
INC	Basavaraj Bhimappa Hitnal. K	47,228	42.83	▲18.18
BJP	Karadi Sanganna Amarappa	41,880	37.98	New
Independent	Kodihalli Chandrashekher	8,666	7.86	New
JD(S)	Mahantayyanamath Ms	5,053	4.58	▼22.34
Kannada Nadu Party	Alawandi Gurumurthyswamy	2,449	2.22	New
JP	Chandrashekaragouda Patil	2,257	2.05	New
Independent	Mallikarjun Adapad	1,567	1.42	New
Independent	Kademani. G. S	1,176	1.07	New
Margin of victory		5,348	4.85	▼16.66
Turnout		110,302	66.35	▼2.11
Total valid votes		110,276		
Registered electors		166,237		▲13.39
INC gain from JD(U)		Swing	▼5.60	

=== Assembly Election 1999 ===
1999 Karnataka Legislative Assembly election : Koppal
Party	Candidate	Votes	%	±%
JD(U)	Karadi Sanganna Amarappa	46,441	48.43	New
JD(S)	K. Basavaraj Hitnal	25,812	26.92	New
INC	Andanappa Agadi	23,637	24.65	▲10.37
Margin of victory		20,629	21.51	▲13.06
Turnout		100,363	68.46	▲0.14
Total valid votes		95,890		
Rejected ballots		4,450	4.43	▲1.59
Registered electors		146,605		▲13.37
JD(U) gain from Independent		Swing	▲25.30	

=== Assembly Election 1994 ===
1994 Karnataka Legislative Assembly election : Koppal
Party	Candidate	Votes	%	±%
Independent	Karadi Sanganna Amarappa	19,850	23.13	New
JD	Angadi Hanumanthappa	12,596	14.68	▼4.82
Independent	Agadi Andanappa Gurushanthappa	12,544	14.62	New
INC	Diwatar Mallikarajun Basappa	12,260	14.28	▼18.59
INC	Basavaraja. K. Bithal	10,411	12.13	New
BJP	Kashamma Shanara Gouda Singatalur	7,279	8.48	▲6.24
Independent	S. N. Quadri	6,913	8.05	New
BSP	Shankrappa Durgappa Kandani	1,983	2.31	New
KRRS	Devappa Channappa Jeenina	1,381	1.61	New
Margin of victory		7,254	8.45	▼2.13
Turnout		88,351	68.32	▲1.57
Total valid votes		85,829		
Rejected ballots		2,510	2.84	▼4.84
Registered electors		129,312		▲7.66
Independent hold		Swing	▼20.32	

=== Assembly Election 1989 ===
1989 Karnataka Legislative Assembly election : Koppal
Party	Candidate	Votes	%	±%
Independent	Diwatar Mallikarajun Basappa	32,163	43.45	New
INC	Shantanna Pampanna Mudgal	24,334	32.87	▼11.92
JD	Agadi Virupakshappa Sanganna	14,431	19.50	New
BJP	H. V. Virupakshappa	1,661	2.24	New
JP	Somappa Dambal	661	0.89	New
Margin of victory		7,829	10.58	▲2.49
Turnout		80,179	66.75	▼0.08
Total valid votes		74,020		
Rejected ballots		6,159	7.68	▲5.24
Registered electors		120,116		▲28.88
Independent gain from JP		Swing	▼9.43	

=== Assembly Election 1985 ===
1985 Karnataka Legislative Assembly election : Koppal
Party	Candidate	Votes	%	±%
JP	Agadi Virupakshappa Sanganna	32,131	52.88	New
INC	Shantanna Pampanna Mudgal	27,218	44.79	▼13.74
Independent	Sanna Nimbappa Gorwar	991	1.63	New
Independent	H. Siddappa Hiresindhogi	422	0.69	New
Margin of victory		4,913	8.09	▼8.98
Turnout		62,282	66.83	▲5.38
Total valid votes		60,762		
Rejected ballots		1,520	2.44	▼2.59
Registered electors		93,198		▲11.54
JP gain from INC		Swing	▼5.65	

=== Assembly Election 1983 ===
1983 Karnataka Legislative Assembly election : Koppal
Party	Candidate	Votes	%	±%
INC	Diwatar Mallikarajun Basappa	28,542	58.53	▲47.33
BJP	Shankargouda Singatalur	20,219	41.47	New
Margin of victory		8,323	17.07	▼17.53
Turnout		51,346	61.45	▼5.32
Total valid votes		48,761		
Rejected ballots		2,585	5.03	▲0.73
Registered electors		83,559		▲8.37
INC gain from INC(I)		Swing	▼3.17	

=== Assembly Election 1978 ===
1978 Karnataka Legislative Assembly election : Koppal
Party	Candidate	Votes	%	±%
INC(I)	Veeranna Pampanna Mudgal	30,402	61.70	New
JP	Shankragouda Lingagouda Singataloor	13,353	27.10	New
INC	Shivamurthyswamy Siddappayyaswamy Inamdar	5,517	11.20	▼65.29
Margin of victory		17,049	34.60	▼21.99
Turnout		51,488	66.77	▲10.65
Total valid votes		49,272		
Rejected ballots		2,216	4.30	▲4.30
Registered electors		77,107		▼1.04
INC(I) gain from INC		Swing	▼14.79	

=== Assembly Election 1972 ===
1972 Mysore State Legislative Assembly election : Koppal
Party	Candidate	Votes	%	±%
INC	M. Virupakshappa Shivappa	32,218	76.49	▲25.44
INC(O)	B. Mudieppa Ballolli	8,379	19.89	New
ABJS	S. G. Lingangouda	1,526	3.62	New
Margin of victory		23,839	56.59	▲54.49
Turnout		43,730	56.12	▼4.02
Total valid votes		42,123		
Registered electors		77,918		▲18.57
INC hold		Swing	▲25.44	

=== Assembly Election 1967 ===
1967 Mysore State Legislative Assembly election : Koppal
Party	Candidate	Votes	%	±%
INC	Virupaxgouda	18,770	51.05	▲0.23
Independent	Shankragoudaru	17,998	48.95	New
Margin of victory		772	2.10	▲0.46
Turnout		39,522	60.14	▲7.96
Total valid votes		36,768		
Registered electors		65,715		▲47.83
INC hold		Swing	▲0.23	

=== Assembly Election 1962 ===
1962 Mysore State Legislative Assembly election : Koppal
Party	Candidate	Votes	%	±%
INC	Malikarjungouda Sanganagouda	10,701	50.82	▲2.25
Lok Sewak Sangh	Patreppa Kenchappa Madnur	10,355	49.18	New
Margin of victory		346	1.64	▼12.91
Turnout		23,196	52.18	▼1.45
Total valid votes		21,056		
Registered electors		44,452		▲13.28
INC hold		Swing	▲2.25	

=== Assembly Election 1957 ===
1957 Mysore State Legislative Assembly election : Koppal
Party	Candidate	Votes	%	±%
INC	Mallikarjun Patil	10,222	48.57	▲2.19
Independent	Huchappayyanmathad Pattadayya	7,161	34.03	New
Independent	Virupaxappa	2,783	13.22	New
PSP	Kabbinad Gaviappa	878	4.17	New
Margin of victory		3,061	14.55	▲13.86
Turnout		21,044	53.63	▲5.61
Total valid votes		21,044		
Registered electors		39,242		▼20.16
INC gain from Independent		Swing	▲1.50	

=== Assembly Election 1952 ===
1952 Hyderabad State Legislative Assembly election : Koppal
Party	Candidate	Votes	%	±%
Independent	Mahadevamma Basan Gowda	11,110	47.07	New
INC	Irapanna	10,946	46.38	New
Socialist Party (India)	Madalalji	1,546	6.55	New
Margin of victory		164	0.69	
Turnout		23,602	48.02	
Total valid votes		23,602		
Registered electors		49,149		
Independent win (new seat)				

== See also ==
- List of constituencies of the Karnataka Legislative Assembly
- Koppal district
