= Bhabini Mahato =

Bengali freedom fighter and activist (1925–2014)

- ভাবিনী মাহাতো
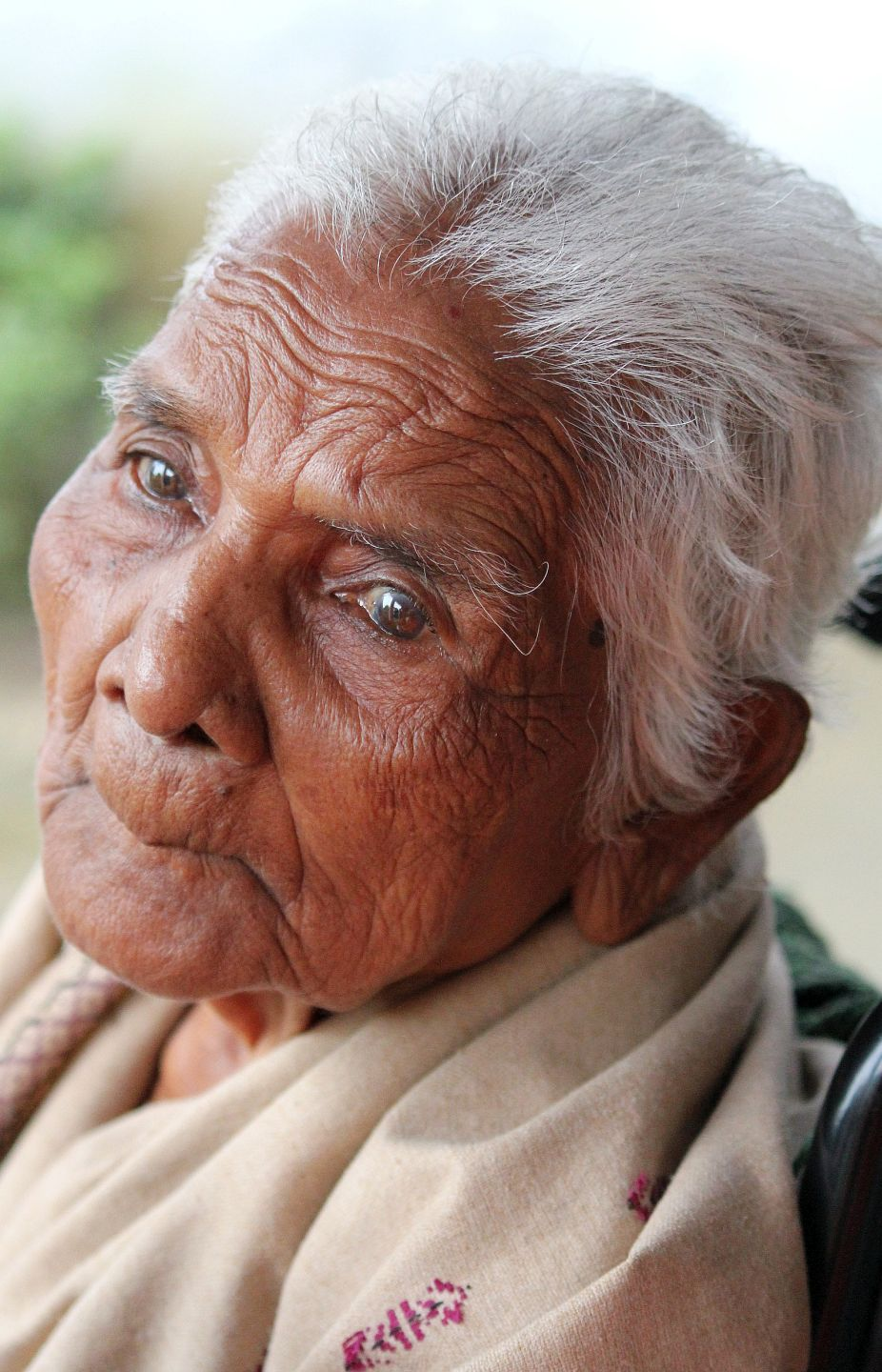
- Born: c. 1925; Majhihira, Purulia, British India
- Died: 24 June 2014; Manbazar, West Bengal
- Occupations: Bengali freedom fighter and activist
- Children: 3

Bhabini Mahato (Bengali: ভাবিনী মাহাতো, c. 1925–24 June 2014) was a Bengali freedom fighter and activist who participated in the Quit India Movement of 1942 and the Bengali Language Movement (Manbhum).

== Biography ==
Mahato was born about 1925 in Majhihira village, Purulia, West Bengal, British India to a Kurmi family. She was married to Baidyanath Mahato when aged eight or nine. Three decades after she married, her husband Baidyanath married her younger sister Urmila as his second wife. Each sister had three children.

During the Quit India Movement, her husband Baidyanath was imprisoned for 13 months in Bhagalpur camp jail. Mahato cooked and fed fugitive revolutionaries hiding in Purulia's jungles and collected funds for the cause.

After Indian independence, Mahato participated in the Bengali Language Movement, which demanded the establishment of Bengali as one of the official languages. She was arrested after a march to Dalhousie, Kolkata in 1956 and spent 11 days in jail.

In 1972, Prime Minister Indira Gandhi, on behalf of the Government of India, awarded her a Tamrapatra.

Mahato died in 2014 in Manbazar, West Bengal.
