= Raigad District Central Co-operative Bank =

Indian co-operative bank

The Raigad District Central Co-operative Bank was established on 30 September 1960. The Reserve Bank of India granted a banking license to the bank on 11 November 1995. Jayant Prabhakar Patil (MLC) took charge of the bank as chairman in 1997. It is the first District Cooperative Central Bank to issue Kisan Credit Card in India which was launched on 18 May 2013.
