= Karadi Sanganna Amarappa =

Indian politician

Member of Parliament Lok Sabha
- In office 2014–2024
- Preceded by: Shivaramagouda Shivanagouda
- Succeeded by: K. Rajashekar Basavaraj Hitnal
- Constituency: Koppal

Member of the Karnataka Legislative Assembly
- In office 1994–2004
- Preceded by: Diwatar Mallikarajun Basappa
- In office 2008–2013
- Succeeded by: K. Raghavendra Hitnal

Personal details
- Born: 18 November 1950 (age 75) Kukanapalli
- Party: Indian National Congress (since 2024); Bharatiya Janata Party (until 2024)

Karadi Sanganna Amarappa was a member of the Bharatiya Janata Party. He was the member of the Parliament, and won two consecutive 2014 Indian general elections & 2019 Indian general election from the Koppal (Lok Sabha constituency) in the state of Karnataka.
