= 1983 elections in India =

Elections in India
- 1983

Elections in the Republic of India in 1983 included elections to six state legislative assemblies and to seats in the Rajya Sabha.

== Overall result ==
| Date(s) | State | Government before | Chief Minister before | Government after | Elected Chief Minister | Maps |
|---|---|---|---|---|---|---|
| 5 January 1983 | Andhra Pradesh | Indian National Congress | Kotla Vijaya Bhaskara Reddy | Telugu Desam Party | N. T. Rama Rao | |
| 5 January 1983 | Karnataka | Indian National Congress | R. Gundu Rao | Janata Party | Ramakrishna Hegde | |
| 17 February 1983 | Meghalaya | Indian National Congress | Williamson A. Sangma | All Party Hill Leaders Conference | B. B. Lyngdoh | |
| 14–20 February 1983 | Assam | President's Rule | | Indian National Congress | Hiteswar Saikia | |
| 1 May 1983 | Tripura | Communist Party of India (Marxist) | Nripen Chakraborty | Communist Party of India (Marxist) | Nripen Chakraborty | |
| 17 November 1983 to 24 November 1983 | Jammu and Kashmir | Jammu and Kashmir National Conference | Farooq Abdullah | Jammu and Kashmir National Conference | Farooq Abdullah | |

== Legislative Assembly elections ==
=== Andhra Pradesh ===
| s.no | party | seats contested | seats won | seats change | vote share | swing |
|---|---|---|---|---|---|---|
| 1 | Telugu Desam Party | 289 | 202 | +202 | 46.3% | + 46.3% |
| 2 | Indian National Congress | 294 | 60 | -115 | 33.64% | -22.78% |
| 3 | Communist Party of India (Marxist) | 28 | 5 | -3 | 2.01% | -0.70% |
| 4 | Communist Party of India | 48 | 6 | +3 | 2.79% | +0.30% |
| 5 | Bharatiya Janata Party | 81 | 3 | +3 | 2.76% | +2.76% |
| 6 | Janata Party | 44 | 1 | -59 | 0.96% | -27.89% |
| 7 | others | 1100 | 20 | +5 | 5.00% | -4.20% |

=== Assam ===
| Party | Votes | % | Seats | +/– |
|---|---|---|---|---|
| Indian National Congress | 1,194,657 | 52.53 | 91 | +65 |
| Indian Congress (Socialist) | 137,685 | 6.05 | 4 | New |
| Communist Party of India (Marxist) | 116,923 | 5.14 | 2 | –9 |
| Plain Tribals Council of Assam | 106,084 | 4.66 | 1 | –3 |
| Communist Party of India | 58,746 | 2.58 | 1 | –4 |
| Independents | 659,995 | 29.02 | 10 | –5 |
| Total | 2,274,090 | 100.00 | 109 | –21 |
| Valid votes | 2,274,090 | 95.34 | | |
| Invalid/blank votes | 111,100 | 4.66 | | |
| Total votes | 2,385,190 | 100.00 | | |
| Registered voters/turnout | 7,284,612 | 32.74 | | |
Source: ECI

=== Jammu and Kashmir ===
| Party | Votes | % | Seats | +/– |
|---|---|---|---|---|
| Jammu & Kashmir National Conference | 1,039,064 | 47.29 | 46 | ▼1 |
| Indian National Congress | 666,112 | 30.32 | 26 | ▲15 |
| Jammu and Kashmir People's Conference | 100,622 | 4.58 | 1 | New |
| Others | 170,415 | 7.76 | 0 | 0 |
| Independents | 220,904 | 10.05 | 2 | ▼2 |
| Total | 2,197,117 | 100.00 | 75 | ▼1 |
| Valid votes | 2,197,117 | 96.71 | | |
| Invalid/blank votes | 74,692 | 3.29 | | |
| Total votes | 2,271,809 | 100.00 | | |
| Registered voters/turnout | 3,101,665 | 73.24 | | |
Source: ECI

=== Karnataka ===
Summary of results of the Karnataka Legislative Assembly election, 1983
| Political Party | Seats Contested | Seats Won | Number of Votes | % of Votes | Seat change |
|---|---|---|---|---|---|
| Janata Party | 193 | 95 | 4,272,318 | 33.07% | ▲36 |
| Indian National Congress | 221 | 82 | 5,221,419 | 40.42% | ▼67 |
| Bharatiya Janata Party | 110 | 18 | 1,024,892 | 7.93% | ▲18 |
| Communist Party of India | 7 | 3 | 161,192 | 1.25% | Steady |
| Communist Party of India (Marxist) | 4 | 3 | 115,320 | 0.89% | ▲3 |
| All India Anna Dravida Munnetra Kazhagam | 1 | 1 | 16,234 | 0.13% | ▲1 |
| Independents | 751 | 22 | 1,998,256 | 15.47% | ▲12 |
| Total | 1365 | 224 | 12,919,459 | | |

=== Meghalaya ===
← Summary of the 17 February 1983 Meghalaya Legislative Assembly election results →
| Parties and coalitions | Popular vote | | | Seats | |
| Parties and coalitions | Votes | % | ±pp | Won | +/− |
|---|---|---|---|---|---|
| Indian National Congress (INC) | 130,956 | 27.68 | 1.64 ▼ | 25 | 5 ▲ |
| All Party Hill Leaders Conference (AHL) | 118,593 | 24.92 | 0.15 ▲ | 15 | 1 ▼ |
| Hill State People's Democratic Party (HDP) | 91,386 | 19.32 | 0.08 ▲ | 15 | 1 ▲ |
| Public Demands Implementation Convention (PDIC) | 23,253 | 4.92 | | 2 | ^{[a]} |
| Communist Party of India | 2,442 | 0.52 | 0.1 ▼ | 0 | Steady |
| Independents (IND) | 106,378 | 22.49 | 2.33 ▼ | 3 | 5 ▼^{[b]} |
| Total | 473,050 | 100.00 | | 60 | ±0 |
Source: Election Commission of India

^{a} In the 1978 election, two candidates from the PDIC were elected, but the party had not obtained registration in time for the election; at that time, the party's representatives were recorded as independents in the official results.

^{b} Does not include the two PDIC candidates elected as independents in 1978.

=== Tripura ===
Performance of the political parties in this election
| Party | Seats contested | Seats won | No. of votes | % of votes | 1977 Seats |
|---|---|---|---|---|---|
| Bharatiya Janata Party | 4 | 0 | 578 | 0.06% | - |
| Communist Party of India | 1 | 0 | 7,657 | 0.83% | 0 |
| Communist Party of India (Marxist) | 56 | 37 | 433,608 | 46.78% | 51 |
| Indian Congress Secular | 3 | 0 | 540 | 0.06% | - |
| Indian National Congress | 45 | 12 | 282,859 | 30.51% | 0 |
| Janata Party | 5 | 0 | 515 | 0.06% | 0 |
| All India Forward Block | 1 | 0 | 6,549 | 0.71% | 1 |
| Revolutionary Socialist Party | 2 | 2 | 15,218 | 1.64% | 2 |
| Tripura Upajati Juba Samiti | 14 | 6 | 97,039 | 10.47% | 4 |
| Independents | 75 | 3 | 82,443 | 8.89% | 2 |
| Total | 206 | 60 | 927,006 | | |

== Local Elections ==
=== Delhi ===
Summary of results of the Delhi Legislative Assembly election, 1983
| Political Party | No. of candidates | No. of elected | Number of Votes | % of Votes |
|---|---|---|---|---|
| Indian National Congress | 56 | 34 | 856,055 | 47.50% |
| Bharatiya Janata Party | 50 | 19 | 666,605 | 36.99% |
| Lok Dal | 6 | 2 | 73,765 | 4.09% |
| Janata Party | 37 | 1 | 65,980 | 3.66% |
| Total | 400 | 56 | 1,802,118 | |
