= Bibhuti Bhusan Das Gupta =

Indian freedom fighter and politician

Bibhuti Bhusan Das Gupta (15 January 1904 - 15 April 1975) was an Indian freedom fighter and politician.

== Early life ==
Das Gupta was born in the village Sonarang in Dacca District in January 1904. He was the son of Rishi Nibaran Chandra Das Gupta. Das Gupta studied at Rajindra College in Faridpur. He didn't finish his college education, but joined the struggle for Indian independence instead.

== Politics ==
In 1921 he acted as village-level secretary of the Indian National Congress. Between 1922 and 1948 he was a member of the Manbhum District Congress Committee and the Bihar Pradesh Congress Committee. Das Gupta was a member of the All India Congress Committee between 1938 and 1948.

Dasgupta was one of the Congress leaders in Manbhum that was arrest in connection with the Salt satyagrah. Upon release from jail (around 1931–1932) he joined with Nibaranchandra Das Gupta to set up the Lok Sevak Sangh, a Gandhian movement working for Swaraj and social reform. They challenged caste hierarchies, preaching to Adivasis and Dalits to participate in social and political life on equal terms with upper caste Hindus. The organization sought to fight against discrimination against lepers.

In 1938-1939 he served as Vice Chairman of Purulia municipality. He was arrested during the Quit India movement. He took part in transforming the Lok Sewak Sangh into a political party in 1948 and became its general secretary.

Das Gupta was elected to the Lok Sabha (lower house of the Parliament of India) from the Purulia seat in the 1957 Indian general election .

Das Gupta won the Purulia constituency seat in the 1967 West Bengal Legislative Assembly election. After the election Das Gupta was named Minister for Panchayats and Social Welfare in the first United Front government.

Das Gupta retained the Purulia seat in the 1969 West Bengal Legislative Assembly election. He was named Minister of Panchayats in the second United Front government, formed in 1969.

He served as editor of Mukti. He lived at Shilpasram in Purulia.
