= Doddanagouda Hanamagouda Patil =

Indian politician (born 1974)

Doddanagouda Hanamagouda Patil (born 1974) is an Indian politician from Karnataka. He is an MLA from Kushtagi Assembly constituency in Koppal district. He won the 2023 Karnataka Legislative Assembly election representing Bharatiya Janata Party.

== Early life and education ==
Patil is from Kushtagi, Koppal district. His father Hanamagouda Patil is a farmer. He completed his Class 12 at Government P.U. College, Kushtagi in 1992.

== Career ==
Patil won Kushtagi Assembly constituency representing Bharatiya Janata Party in the 2023 Karnataka Legislative Assembly election. He polled 92,915 votes and defeated his nearest rival, Amaregouda Linganagouda Patil Bayyapur of Indian National Congress, by a margin of 9,646 votes. Earlier, he won the 2013 Karnataka Legislative Assembly election on BJP ticket but lost the next election in 2018 polls.
