= Shivaramagouda Shivanagouda =

Indian politician

Shivaramagouda Sivanagouda (born 3 February 1954 Sugur, District Bellary) is an Indian politician from Karnataka State and member of the Bhartiya Janata Party. He is member of 15th Lok Sabha from Koppal since June 2009.

Shivaramagouda studied Law and resides at Gangavathi in Koppal district. He won the Lok Sabha elections with a record setting margin of Over 89,000 votes, the highest margin won by any Lok Sabha member of Koppal constituency. As of 2017 he is the Vice President of Karnataka housing board and also associated with many film boards and theatre associations.
