= Mukti (newspaper) =

Mukti was a weekly newspaper in Purulia, West Bengal, India. It started publishing in 1925 from the Purulia town and later from the eastern manbhum district of then Bihar. It was published as a part of "Silpashram", a Gandhian Ashram. This newspaper has great importance in representing the local history from in its inception.

== Editors ==
These peoples have been editors of 'Mukti'.

Editors
Tarun, the Great (Boss of founder-editor)
Nibarancandra Dasgupta (founder-editor)
S. Vir Raghav Acarya
Phanindranath Dasgupta
Atul Chandra Ghosh
Aruncandra Ghosh
Bibhuti Bhusan Das Gupta
Cittabhusan Dasgupta
