= Basavaraj Patil Anwari =

Indian politician

Member of Legislative Assembly of Karnataka

Personal details
- Party: Indian National Congress

Basavaraj Patil Anwari (born 8 April 1943) is an Indian politician. He served as Minister of State in the Ministry of Steel and Mines in Chandra Shekhar government from 21 November 1990 to 20 February 1991. He was Member of Parliament in 9th Lok Sabha and 10th Lok Sabha from Koppal.

== Career ==
Anwari fought 1989 Lok Sabha election from Koppal Lok Sabha constituency on Janata Dal ticket and won by securing 49.31% votes. In 1991 Lok Sabha election, he fought from Indian National Congress ticket against Siddaramaiah of Janata Dal and won by securing 44% votes.
