= Lok Sewak Sangh =

Defunct political party from Purulia, West Bengal

The Lok Sewak Sangh ('Union of Servants of the People', abbreviated LSS), or Manbhum Lok Sewak Sangh, was a political party in Purulia District, West Bengal, India. LSS was founded in 1948. The party was the main political force in Purulia District from the independence of India until the fall of the second United Front cabinet.

It is not to be confused with the Gandhian social movement by the same name.

== Background ==
LSS had been set up as a local social movement in Manbhum, by leaders like Nibaranchandra Dasgupta and Bibhuti Dasgupta, who had been released from jail in the early 1930s. LSS was a Gandhian movement working for Swaraj and social reform. They challenged caste hierarchies, preaching to Adivasis and Dalits to participate in social and political life on equal terms with upper caste Hindus. The organization sought to fight against discrimination against lepers.

== History ==
LSS was constituted as a political party by former leaders of the Indian National Congress, who had played a leading role in the Quit India movement in Purulia District. Notable members of this group included Bibhuti Dasgupta and Arun Ghosh. Through forming LSS they wanted to promote use of Bengali language in Bengali-dominated areas in southern Bihar state. They labelled the imposition of Hindi language as 'linguistic imperialism'. After breaking with the Indian National Congress its elected officials resigned and were re-elected on LSS tickets. The party adhered to Gandhian socialism.

== 1951–1952 elections ==
The party contested the 1951–1952 parliamentary elections as well as the first assembly elections, being able to defeat Congress candidates in some constituencies. In the election to the Lok Sabha (Lower House of the Parliament of India), LSS won the Manbhum South-cum-Dhalbum constituency, which elected two parliamentarians. The LSS parliamentarians were Bhajahari Mahato and Chaitan Manjhi. LSS had fielded 4 candidates, won together mustered 309,940 votes (0.29% of the national vote).

In the 1952 Bihar Legislative Assembly election, LSS fielded 12 candidates out of whom 7 were victorious. The LSS elected legislators were Sirish Chandra Banerjee (Baghmundi), Dimo Charmahar (Purulia-cum-Hura), Samarendra Nath Ojha (Purulia-cum-Hura), Nitai Singh Sardar (Manbazar-cum-Patamda), Satya Kinkar Mahata (Manbazar-cum-Patamda), Bhim Chandra Mahato (Barabazar-cum-Chandil) and Atul Chandra Singh Bhuiya (Barabazar cum Chandil). In total the 12 LSS candidates mustered 148,921 votes (1.56% of the statewide vote).

== Struggle for inclusion in West Bengal ==
Ahead of the States Reorganisation Act, 1956, LSS organised a movement in 1955 to secure the transfer of Bengali-speaking areas of Bihar into West Bengal. The party organized a march of satyagrahis by foot from Pakbirah village (Manbhum District) to Calcutta, a 480 km walk. The march lasted 16 days, gathering some 1,000 participants. When reaching the vicinity of the West Bengal government headquarters, the march was broken up by police and participants arrested. Some were jailed.

After the reorganisation of the states of India in 1956, most of the areas where LSS was active became part of West Bengal. As of 1956 the leader of the party was Sirish Chandra Banerjee, who became of the West Bengal Legislative Assembly in 1956. In the 1957 West Bengal Legislative Assembly election LSS fielded candidates in all 11 assembly seats in Purulia District.

LSS contested the 1962 West Bengal Legislative Assembly election, fielding 11 candidates. LSS obtained 68,583 votes (0.72% of the statewide vote), winning 4 seats.

== United Front ==
Ahead of the 1967 West Bengal Legislative Assembly election LSS entered into a seat-sharing agreement with both the People's United Left Front and the United Left Front. After the election Bibhuti Dasgupta of LSS was named Minister for Panchayats and Social Welfare in the first United Front government.

LSS fielded 6 candidates in the 1969 West Bengal Legislative Assembly election, winning 4 seats. The party obtained 99,844 (0.74%). After the election LSS politician Bibhuti Dasgupta was named Panchayat Minister in the second United Front cabinet.

== After the fall of the United Front ==
The LSS dominance over Purulia politics was broken after the fall of the United Front. In the 1971 West Bengal Legislative Assembly election LSS fielded 11 candidates, but none was elected. The party obtained 52,980 votes (0.41% of the statewide vote).

The party went into rapid decline. Most of its erstwhile supporters joined the Communist Party of India (Marxist).

== Relief work ==
In line with Gandhian principles, LSS ran relief activities in during food scarcities, floods and other calamities. It ran an auxiliary organization, Muktiyuddho Sewak Sangh, to help former freedom fighters.

== Mukti ==
LSS published Mukti ('Liberation') as its weekly organ during many years. The publication had been founded during the independence struggle. Bibhuti Dasgupta, the general secretary of the party, edited Mukti.

As of the early 1980s, it was issued in 1,000 copies and edited by Arun Chandra Ghosh.
