= Karnataka Legislature =

Bicameral legislature of the Indian state of Karnataka

Karnataka Legislature Karnāṭaka Sāsakāṅga
- Emblem of Karnataka

- Flag of India

Type
- Type: Bicameral of Karnataka
- Houses: Karnataka Legislative Council (Upper House); Karnataka Legislative Assembly (Lower House)

History
- Founded: Karnataka Legislative Assembly – 1881 (145 years ago); Karnataka Legislative Council – 1907 (119 years ago)

Leadership
- Governor: Thawar Chand Gehlot since 11 July 2021
- Chief Minister: D. K. Shivakumar, INC since 3 June 2026
- Deputy Chief Minister: G. Parameshwara, INC since 3 June 2026
- Chairperson of Legislative Council: Saleem Ahmed, INC since 14 August 2026
- Deputy Chairperson of Legislative Council: Umashree, INC since 18 August 2026
- Leader of the House in Legislative Council: Yathindra Siddaramaiah, INC since 13 August 2026
- Leader of the Opposition in Legislative Council: Chalavadi Narayanaswamy, BJP since 23 July 2024
- Speaker of Legislative Assembly: G. S. Patil, INC since 14 August 2026
- Deputy Speaker of Legislative Assembly: Mankala Vaidya, INC since 17 August 2026
- Leader of the House in Legislative Assembly: D. K. Shivakumar, INC since 3 June 2026

Structure
- Political groups: Government (39): INC (38); IND (1); Opposition (32): BJP (24); JD(S) (8); Vacant (5)
- Political groups: Government (140): INC (136); SKP (1); IND (3); Official opposition (81): BJP (63); JD(S) (18); Other opposition (1): IND (1); Vacant (2)

Elections
- Voting system: Single transferable vote
- Voting system: First past the post
- First election: 1952
- First election: 26 March 1952
- Last election: 2024
- Last election: 10 May 2023
- Next election: 2026
- Next election: May 2028

Meeting place
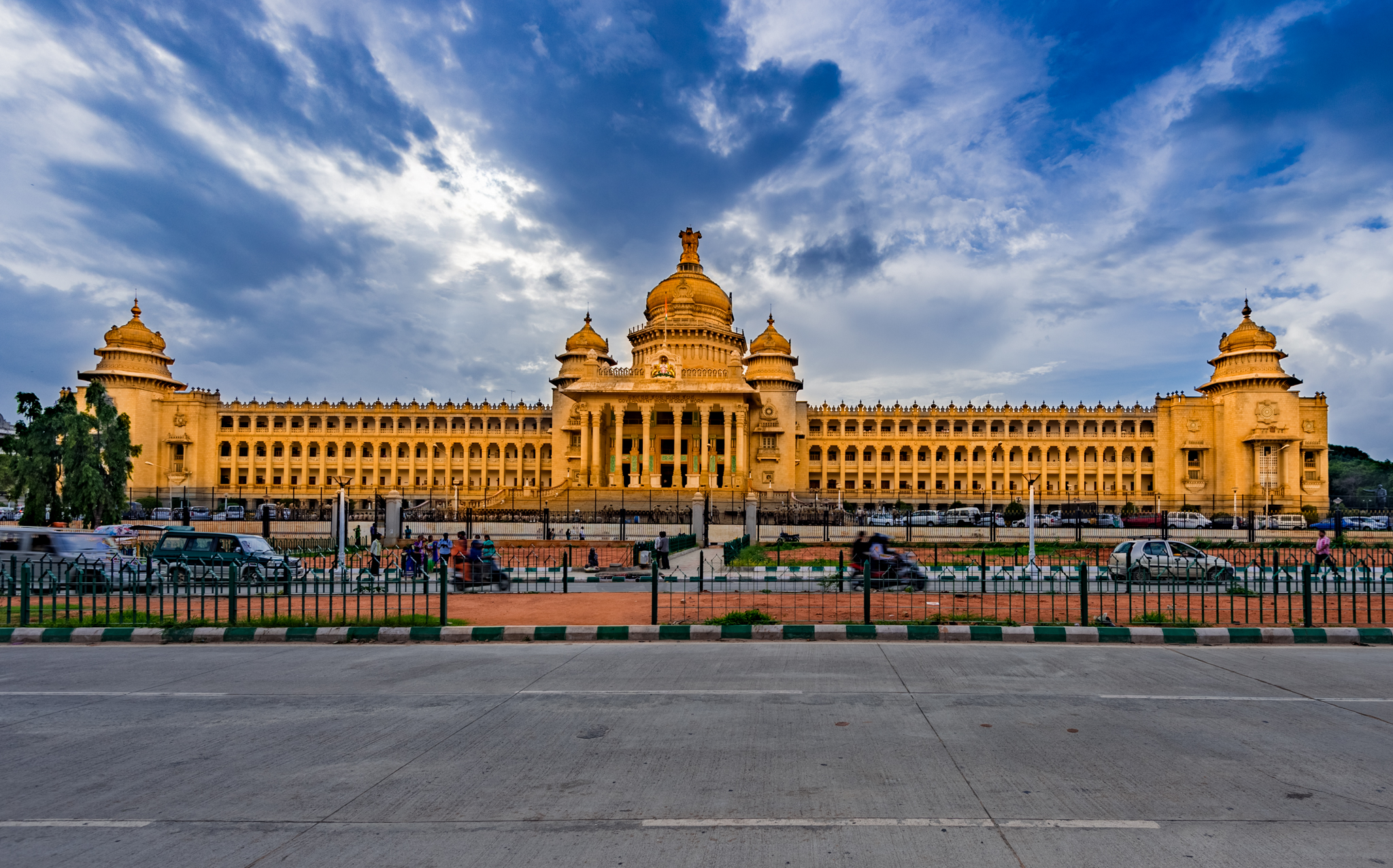
- Vidhana Soudha, Bengaluru, Karnataka, India
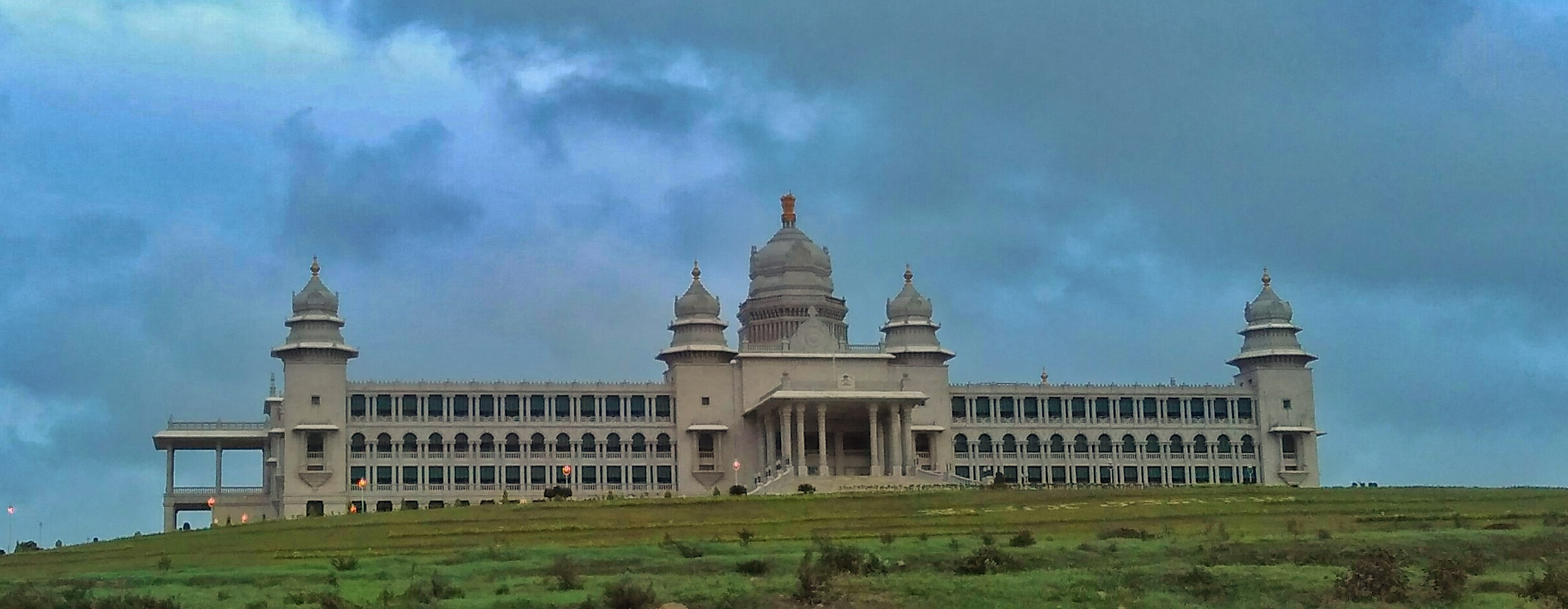
- Suvarna Vidhana Soudha, Belagavi, Karnataka, India (Winter session)

Website
- Karnataka Legislature

Constitution
- Constitution of India

The Karnataka Legislature (Karnāṭaka Sāsakāṅga) is the bicameral legislature of the Indian state of Karnataka. It consists of two houses:

- the 75-member Karnataka Legislative Council (Vidhana Parishad), the upper house, and
- the 224-member Karnataka Legislative Assembly (Vidhana Sabha), the lower house.

The Governor of Karnataka is also a constituent part of the Legislature under the Constitution of India. Karnataka is one of only six Indian states with a bicameral legislature, the others being Andhra Pradesh, Bihar, Maharashtra, Telangana, and Uttar Pradesh.

== History ==
=== Origins: Mysore Representative Assembly (1881) ===
The origins of the Karnataka Legislature lie in the princely state of Mysore. On 29 March 1881, a decision to set up Mysore Representative Assembly was taken by Maharaja Chamarajendra Wadiyar X. An order was issued by the Maharaja on 25 August 1881 for its constitution, and the first meeting of the Assembly was held on 7 October 1881. It was the first representative assembly in any princely state in India, making Mysore a pioneer in democratic governance in the subcontinent.

=== Formation of the upper house (1907) ===
The Karnataka Legislative Council was established on 6 March 1907 under Regulation I of 1907 as the legislative council for the princely state of Mysore. It formed the Kingdom's sole upper house, carved out of the existing Representative Assembly, which thereafter functioned as the lower house. The Council initially consisted of not less than 10 and not more than 15 additional members nominated by the Government, of whom not less than two-fifths were required to be non-officials. In 1923, the strength of the Council was fixed at 50, with a decided non-official majority required.

=== Post-independence reorganisation ===
The Maharaja of Mysore issued a proclamation on 25 November 1949 and the Representative Assembly and the Council were dissolved on 16 December 1949. The Constituent Assembly of Mysore State became the Provisional Assembly of Mysore until elections were held under the Constitution of India. The first Assembly under the Constitution was constituted in 1952. Following the States Reorganisation Act, the new state of Mysore was significantly expanded along linguistic lines on 1 November 1956; the first sitting of the Assembly of the new state of Karnataka was held on 19 December 1956. The state was renamed Karnataka on 1 November 1973, and the legislature took its current name accordingly.

=== Current session ===
The current 16th Karnataka Legislative Assembly was constituted following the 2023 Karnataka Assembly elections, in which the Indian National Congress won 135 out of 224 seats, securing a majority. The Second Siddaramaiah ministry was sworn in on 20 May 2023. Following an internal Congress power-sharing arrangement, D. K. Shivakumar was sworn in as Chief Minister on 3 June 2026, succeeding Siddaramaiah. The change of government was followed by a reshuffling of legislative offices: G. S. Patil (INC) was elected the 18th Speaker of the Legislative Assembly on 14 August 2026, and Saleem Ahmed (INC) was elected the 19th Chairperson of the Legislative Council the same day, succeeding Basavaraj Horatti (BJP), who had held the post since December 2022.

== Meeting places ==
=== Vidhana Soudha, Bengaluru ===
The principal seat of the Karnataka Legislature is Vidhana Soudha in Bengaluru. Completed in 1956 after four years of construction, it stands as one of India's largest and most imposing legislative structures, built primarily from local granite in a Neo-Dravidian architectural style that integrates elements of Dravidian, Indo-Islamic, and British influences. The initiative originated under Chief Minister Kengal Hanumanthaiah during the early 1950s, with the foundation stone laid by Prime Minister Jawaharlal Nehru on 13 July 1951. Nehru called it "a temple dedicated to the nation". The building covers over 60 acres and its famous inscription in Kannada, Sarkarada kelasa devara kelasa ("Government Work is God's Work"), was personally added by Hanumanthaiah.

=== Suvarna Vidhana Soudha, Belagavi ===
The winter session of the legislature is held at Suvarna Vidhana Soudha in Belagavi, a Neo-Dravidian building that mirrors the architecture of Vidhana Soudha. Construction began in 2009 and the building was inaugurated on 11 October 2012 at a cost of ₹4 billion. Its location in Belagavi, a city with a significant Marathi-speaking population close to the Maharashtra border, reflects the legislature's role in asserting Karnataka's territorial and cultural claims over the region.

== Karnataka Legislative Assembly ==
The Karnataka Legislative Assembly (Vidhana Sabha) is the lower house of the Karnataka Legislature. It has 224 members directly elected from single-member constituencies using the first-past-the-post system by adult franchise. Members serve five-year terms. A government must command the confidence of the Assembly to remain in office.

The current 16th Assembly, elected in May 2023, has its term running until May 2028. Following U. T. Khader's resignation as Speaker on 3 June 2026 to join the Shivakumar cabinet, Deputy Speaker Rudrappa Lamani served as acting Speaker until G. S. Patil was elected the 18th Speaker on 14 August 2026, having been proposed by Chief Minister D. K. Shivakumar and seconded by Deputy Chief Minister G. Parameshwara. Mankala Vaidya (INC) was subsequently elected Deputy Speaker on 17 August 2026.

== Karnataka Legislative Council ==
The Karnataka Legislative Council (Vidhana Parishad) is the upper house of the Karnataka Legislature and a permanent body not subject to dissolution. It comprises 75 members with six-year terms, with one-third retiring every two years. Of the 75 seats, 25 are elected by the Karnataka Legislative Assembly members, 25 are elected by local authorities, 7 are elected by graduates, 7 are elected by teachers, and 11 members are nominated by the Governor.

The Council serves as a revising chamber, able to delay but not ultimately block legislation passed by the Assembly. Unlike the Assembly, the Council has no role in a confidence vote; the government's survival depends solely on the Assembly. Saleem Ahmed (INC) was elected Chairperson on 14 August 2026, defeating BJP nominee P. H. Pujar 38 votes to 30, following the resignation of Basavaraj Horatti. Umashree (INC) was elected Deputy Chairperson on 18 August 2026, and Yathindra Siddaramaiah (INC) succeeded N. S. Boseraju as Leader of the House on 13 August 2026.

== Current officeholders ==
Office	Leader's Image	Leader's Name	Party	Leader Since
Governor		Thawar Chand Gehlot	Non partisan	11 July 2021
Chief Minister		D. K. Shivakumar	INC	3 June 2026
Deputy Chief Minister		G. Parameshwara	INC	3 June 2026
Legislative Council
Chairperson		Saleem Ahmed	INC	14 August 2026
Deputy Chairperson		Umashree	INC	18 August 2026
Leader of the House in Legislative Council		Yathindra Siddaramaiah	INC	13 August 2026
Leader of the Opposition in Legislative Council		Chalavadi Narayanaswamy	BJP	23 July 2024
Legislative Assembly
Speaker		G. S. Patil	INC	14 August 2026
Deputy Speaker		Mankala Vaidya	INC	17 August 2026
Leader of the House in Legislative Assembly (Chief Minister)		D. K. Shivakumar	INC	3 June 2026
Deputy Leader of the House in Legislative Assembly (Deputy Chief Minister)		G. Parameshwara	INC	3 June 2026
Leader of the Opposition in Legislative Assembly		R. Ashoka	BJP	17 November 2023
Deputy Leader of the Opposition in Legislative Assembly		Arvind Bellad	BJP	25 December 2023

== Sessions ==
The Karnataka Legislature meets in Bengaluru for most of the year. By convention, a winter session is held at Suvarna Vidhana Soudha in Belagavi, typically in November–December. Under Article 174 of the Constitution of India, no more than six months may elapse between two successive sessions of the Assembly.

== See also ==
- Government of Karnataka
- Karnataka Council of Ministers
- Karnataka Legislative Assembly
- Karnataka Legislative Council
- Chief Minister of Karnataka
- Vidhana Soudha
- Suvarna Vidhana Soudha
- 2023 Karnataka Legislative Assembly election
