= Government of Karnataka =

Indian State Government

Government of Karnataka Karnāṭaka Sarkāra
- Emblem of Karnataka
- Seat of Government: Vidhana Soudha Bengaluru (summer session) (Main Seat); Suvarna Vidhana Soudha, Belagavi (winter session) (Secondary Seat)
- Website: https://www.karnataka.gov.in/english

Legislative branch
- Assembly: Karnataka Legislative Assembly
- Speaker: G. S. Patil (INC)
- Deputy Speaker: Mankala Vaidya (INC)
- Members in Assembly: 224
- Council: Karnataka Legislative Council
- Chair: Saleem Ahmed (INC)
- Deputy Chair: Umashree (INC)
- Members in Council: 75

Executive branch
- Governor: Thawar Chand Gehlot (Note: On 12 October 2026 the President of India appointed Sudha Yadav as the next Governor. She had not assumed office as of 14 October 2026, and Gehlot continues in office until she is sworn in, which is scheduled for 16 October 2026. See #Executive.)
- Chief Minister: D. K. Shivakumar (INC)
- Deputy Chief Minister: G. Parameshwara (INC)
- Chief Secretary of Government: Dr. Shalini Rajneesh, IAS

Judiciary branch
- High Court: High Court of Karnataka
- Chief Justice: Vibhu Bakhru
- Seat: Bengaluru
- Additional Benches of High Court: Hubballi-Dharwad; Kalaburagi

The Government of Karnataka, abbreviated as GoK or GoKA, formerly known as Government of Mysore (1956–1974), is a democratically elected state body with the governor as the ceremonial head to govern the south Indian state of Karnataka. The governor, who is appointed by the president of India for a term of five years, appoints the chief minister and, on the advice of the chief minister, appoints their council of ministers. Even though the governor remains the ceremonial head of the state, the day-to-day running of the government is taken care of by the chief minister and their council of ministers in whom a great amount of legislative powers are vested.

Since 3 June 2026 the government has been headed by D. K. Shivakumar of the Indian National Congress, who succeeded Siddaramaiah.

== Executive ==
The Governor's official residence in Bengaluru, formerly Raj Bhavan, has been called Lok Bhavan since 3 December 2025.

Office	Leader	Portrait	Since
Governor	Sudha Yadav		16 October 2026
Chief Minister	D. K. Shivakumar		3 June 2026
Deputy Chief Minister	G. Parameshwara		3 June 2026
Advocate General	Shashi Kiran Shetty		21 May 2023

Beyond the council of ministers, the Chief Minister has appointed holders of cabinet rank. On 12 August 2026 the Virajpet MLA A. S. Ponnanna, who had been the Congress nominee for Deputy Speaker and was Siddaramaiah's legal adviser in the previous government, became the Chief Minister's political secretary with cabinet rank, and R. V. Deshpande was reappointed chairperson of the Karnataka Administrative Reforms Commission with cabinet rank.

== Legislative ==
Office	Leader	Portrait	Constituency	Since
Karnataka Legislature
Karnataka Legislative Council
Chairperson	Saleem Ahmed	Saleem Ahmed	Dharwad–Gadag–Haveri Local Authorities	14 August 2026 (Note: He succeeded Basavaraj Horatti, who resigned on 7 August 2026 as the Congress threatened a no-confidence motion. Saleem Ahmed received 38 votes against 30 for the NDA candidate P. H. Pujar.)
Deputy Chairperson	Umashree		Nominated	18 August 2026 (Note: The post fell vacant when M. K. Pranesh resigned as deputy chairman and as a member of the Council after the Supreme Court upheld the High Court's finding that Gayathri Shanthegowda, not he, had won the 2021 Chikkamagaluru local authorities seat. Umashree was nominated to the Council by the Governor in August 2023 under the quota for artists.)
Leader of the House	Yathindra Siddaramaiah		Legislative Assembly	13 August 2026
Leader of Opposition	Chalavadi Narayanaswamy		Legislative Assembly	23 July 2024
Chief Whip of the Government	Vacant (Note: The previous Government Chief Whip in the Council, Saleem Ahmed, became Chairperson of the Council in August 2026; no successor had been reported in the sources reviewed.)			August 2026
Chief Whip of the Opposition	N. Ravikumar		Legislative Assembly	25 December 2023
Karnataka Legislative Assembly
Speaker	G. S. Patil		Ron	14 August 2026 (Note: U. T. Khader resigned as Speaker on 3 June 2026 to join the Shivakumar ministry; Deputy Speaker Rudrappa Lamani discharged the Speaker's duties until he too was inducted into the ministry on 3 August, when the Governor appointed T. B. Jayachandra pro-tem Speaker.)
Deputy Speaker	Mankala Vaidya		Bhatkal	18 August 2026
Leader of the House	D. K. Shivakumar		Kanakapura	3 June 2026
Leader of Opposition	R. Ashoka		Padmanabhanagar	17 November 2023
Deputy Leader of the Opposition	Arvind Bellad		Hubli-Dharwad West	25 December 2023
Chief Whip of the Government	Ashok Pattan		Ramdurg	3 July 2023
Chief Whip of the Opposition	Dr. Doddanagouda Hanamagouda Patil		Kushtagi	25 December 2023

== Judiciary ==
Office	Leader	Portrait	Since
High Court of Karnataka
Chief Justice	Vibhu Bakhru		19 July 2025

== Independent constitutional bodies ==
Office	Leader	Portrait	Since
State Election Commissioner	G. S. Sangreshi		June 2024
Chairman State Public Service Commission	Dr. B. Prabhudev (interim) (Note: Chairman Shivashankarappa S. Sahukar (in office since 4 April 2021) was first suspended by the Governor under Article 317(2) of the Constitution by an order dated 10 July 2026, after allegations that his daughters had illegally applied for government posts; Karnataka Public Service Commission member Prabhudev was made interim chairman. On 18 August 2026 the High Court of Karnataka quashed that order because it had been passed without the aid and advice of the Council of Ministers, and directed Sahukar's reinstatement. The Governor suspended him again on 25 August 2026, this time on the Cabinet's advice.)		25 August 2026

=== Statutory bodies ===
Office	Leader	Since
Lokayukta	B. S. Patil	15 June 2022
Chief Information Commissioner	G. Sathyavathi	4 May 2026
Chairperson, State Commission for Backward Classes	Madhusudhan R. Naik	31 January 2025

== Council of Ministers ==
Portfolio allocations reflect the Governor's notification of 12 August 2026, as amended on 18 August 2026 (see Cabinet Reshuffles for the sequence of all allocations). The Planning and Statistics portfolio held by B. Nagendra prior to his resignation on 28 August 2026 has not been reallocated as of this revision. Sources:

Sr. No.	Name	Portrait	MLA/MLC	Constituency	Designation	Portfolio(s)	Party	Term of Office		
Sr. No.	Name	Portrait	MLA/MLC	Constituency	Designation	Portfolio(s)	Party	Took Office	Left Office	Duration
Chief Minister
1	D. K. Shivakumar		MLA	Kanakapura	Chief Minister	Finance; Cabinet Affairs; Dept. of Personnel and Administrative Reforms; Intelligence; Information, Law, Justice and Human Rights; Agriculture Marketing; Commissionerate of Town & Country Planning; All Urban Local Bodies falling under Bengaluru Development Authority (BDA) and Bengaluru Metropolitan Region Development Authority (BMRDA) areas; All unallocated portfolios	INC	3 June 2026	Incumbent	155 days
Deputy Chief Minister
2	G. Parameshwara		MLA	Koratagere	Deputy Chief Minister	Revenue; Sports	INC	3 June 2026	Incumbent	155 days
Cabinet Ministers
3	K. H. Muniyappa		MLA	Devanahalli	Cabinet Minister	Social Welfare	INC	3 June 2026	Incumbent	155 days
4	K. J. George		MLA	Sarvagnanagar	Cabinet Minister	Energy; Tourism	INC	3 June 2026	Incumbent	155 days
5	M. B. Patil		MLA	Babaleshwar	Cabinet Minister	Large & Medium Industries; Infrastructure Development (Note: ANI's 12 August 2026 portfolio-allocation post lists Patil's department as "Commerce and Industries," while The News Minute's report on the same notification does not list him among the four ministers whose portfolios changed that day, implying continuity with his existing Large & Medium Industries and Infrastructure Development portfolio. This may reflect an informal renaming of the same department rather than a substantive change; the discrepancy between sources is noted here rather than resolved. Confirm against the Governor's written notification once available.)	INC	3 June 2026	Incumbent	155 days
6	Satish Jarkiholi		MLA	Yemkanmardi	Cabinet Minister	Public Works	INC	3 June 2026	Incumbent	155 days
7	Krishna Byre Gowda		MLA	Byatarayanapura	Cabinet Minister	Greater Bengaluru Development (Note: (including Greater Bengaluru Authority — GBA, Bengaluru North City Corporation — BNCC, Bengaluru South City Corporation — BSCC, Bengaluru East City Corporation — BECC, Bengaluru West City Corporation — BWCC, Bengaluru Central City Corporation — BCCC, Bengaluru Water Supply & Sewerage Board — BWSSB, Bengaluru Metro Rail Corporation Limited — BMRCL)); Parliamentary Affairs and Legislation	INC	3 June 2026	Incumbent	155 days
8	Priyank Kharge		MLA	Chittapur	Cabinet Minister	Home (excluding Intelligence); Information Technology & Biotechnology; E-Governance	INC	3 June 2026	Incumbent	155 days
9	U. T. Khader		MLA	Mangalore	Cabinet Minister	Health & Family Welfare; Minority Welfare; Haj and Wakf	INC	3 June 2026	Incumbent	155 days
10	Eshwara Khandre		MLA	Bhalki	Cabinet Minister	Rural Development; Panchayati Raj	INC	3 June 2026	Incumbent	155 days
11	Yathindra Siddaramaiah		MLC	Legislative Assembly	Cabinet Minister	Urban Development (Note: (including Karnataka Urban Water Supply and Drainage Board — KUWSDB, Karnataka Urban Infrastructure Development and Finance Corporation — KUIDFC, all Urban Development Authorities and Local Planning Authorities; excluding BDA, BMRDA, GBA, Commissionerate of Town & Country Planning))	INC	3 June 2026	Incumbent	155 days
12	Byrathi Suresh		MLA	Hebbal	Cabinet Minister	Transport	INC	3 June 2026	Incumbent	155 days
13	Sharan Prakash Patil		MLA	Sedam	Cabinet Minister	Medical Education; Skill Development	INC	3 June 2026	Incumbent	155 days
14	Ramalinga Reddy		MLA	B.T.M Layout	Cabinet Minister	Forest, Ecology and Environment	INC	3 June 2026	Incumbent	155 days (Note: Reddy tendered his resignation on 5 June 2026, citing dissatisfaction with the portfolio allocated to him; the Congress high command rejected the resignation on 6 June 2026 and he continued in office without a break in tenure (see Controversies). He initially held Water Resources, and was reassigned Forest, Ecology and Environment in the 12 August 2026 portfolio allocation.)
15	B. Z. Zameer Ahmed Khan		MLA	Chamrajpet	Cabinet Minister	Housing	INC	3 August 2026	Incumbent	94 days
16	Santosh Lad		MLA	Kalghatgi	Cabinet Minister	Labour and Employment	INC	3 August 2026	Incumbent	94 days
17	Rizwan Arshad		MLA	Shivajinagar	Cabinet Minister	Food and Civil Supplies; Consumer Affairs	INC	3 August 2026	Incumbent	94 days
18	Madhu Bangarappa	(to the left)	MLA	Soraba	Cabinet Minister	Primary and Secondary Education	INC	3 August 2026	Incumbent	94 days
19	S. S. Mallikarjun		MLA	Davanagere North	Cabinet Minister	Mines and Geology; Horticulture	INC	3 August 2026	Incumbent	94 days (Note: The Congress high command's initial list, released on the morning of 3 August 2026, had named Mankal S. Vaidya (Bhatkal); the party subsequently dropped Vaidya at the last minute to accommodate Mallikarjun, reportedly to address the cabinet's Lingayat representation. Vaidya, a minister in the Second Siddaramaiah ministry, was not part of the final list sworn in.)
20	K. S. Basavanthappa		MLA	Mayakonda	Cabinet Minister	Muzrai; Fisheries, Ports and Inland Water	INC	3 August 2026	Incumbent	94 days
21	Laxman Savadi		MLA	Athani	Cabinet Minister	Co-operation excluding Agriculture Marketing	INC	3 August 2026	Incumbent	94 days
22	Vijayanand Kashappanavar		MLA	Hungund	Cabinet Minister	Small Scale Industries; Public Enterprises	INC	3 August 2026	Incumbent	94 days
23	Basavaraj Rayareddy		MLA	Yelburga	Cabinet Minister	Higher Education	INC	3 August 2026	Incumbent	94 days
24	H. C. Balakrishna		MLA	Magadi	Cabinet Minister	Municipal Administration	INC	3 August 2026	Incumbent	94 days
25	K. M. Shivalinge Gowda		MLA	Arsikere	Cabinet Minister	Excise from Finance Department	INC	3 August 2026	Incumbent	94 days
26	N. Chaluvaraya Swamy		MLA	Nagamangala	Cabinet Minister	Major and Medium Irrigation	INC	3 August 2026	Incumbent	94 days
27	Ajay Singh		MLA	Jevargi	Cabinet Minister	Minor Irrigation; Science and Technology	INC	3 August 2026	Incumbent	94 days
28	P. M. Narendraswamy		MLA	Malavalli	Cabinet Minister	Agriculture	INC	3 August 2026	Incumbent	94 days
29	Shivaraj Tangadagi		MLA	Kanakagiri	Cabinet Minister	Backward Classes Welfare; Kannada and Culture	INC	3 August 2026	Incumbent	94 days
30	Rudrappa Lamani		MLA	Haveri	Cabinet Minister	Sugar and Textiles	INC	3 August 2026	Incumbent	94 days (Note: Lamani had served as Deputy Speaker of the Karnataka Legislative Assembly since July 2023, and presided over sittings of the Assembly during the vacancy in the Speakership that followed U. T. Khader's June 2026 resignation. He vacated the Deputy Speakership upon his own induction into the Cabinet on 3 August 2026 and was succeeded in that post by Mankala Vaidya, elected on 18 August 2026.)
31	T. Raghumurthy		MLA	Challakere	Cabinet Minister	Scheduled Tribe (ST) Welfare	INC	3 August 2026	Incumbent	94 days
32	C. Puttarangashetty		MLA	Chamarajanagar	Cabinet Minister	Animal Husbandry and Sericulture	INC	3 August 2026	Incumbent	94 days

Vacancies (2): Gayathri Shanthegowda (MLC, Chikkamagaluru Local Authorities' Constituency), cleared by the Congress high command for the August expansion, was administered the oath as a Member of the Karnataka Legislative Council on 7 August 2026 — removing the procedural obstacle to her ministerial induction — but had not been sworn in as a minister as of 22 September 2026, more than six weeks later. B. Nagendra (Bellary Rural) resigned on 28 August 2026 (see Former Ministers). The ministry stands at 32 members, two short of Karnataka's sanctioned strength of 34.

== District in-charge ministers ==
Each district is assigned a cabinet minister as its in-charge (guardian) minister, who reviews district administration and hoists the national flag on Independence Day and Republic Day. After taking office, the Shivakumar ministry first made interim assignments in June 2026, which were described as temporary pending the cabinet expansion. On 4 August 2026, a day after the expansion, the Chief Minister assigned districts to the expanded cabinet, and the arrangement was adjusted in mid-August, when Rizwan Arshad took over Udupi and K. S. Basavanthappa took over Vijayanagara.

Sr No.	District	In-charge minister	Party
01	Bagalkot	Vijayanand Kashappanavar	Indian National Congress
02	Bengaluru Urban	Krishna Byre Gowda	Indian National Congress
03	Bengaluru Rural	K. H. Muniyappa	Indian National Congress
04	Belagavi	Satish Jarkiholi	Indian National Congress
05	Ballari	Vacant (Note: B. Nagendra, the in-charge minister, resigned from the ministry on 28 August 2026 over the Valmiki Corporation case, and the Governor accepted the resignation on the Chief Minister's advice; no successor in-charge minister had been reported in the sources reviewed.)	Indian National Congress
06	Bidar	Eshwara Khandre	Indian National Congress
07	Vijayapura	M. B. Patil	Indian National Congress
08	Chamarajanagar	C. Puttarangashetty	Indian National Congress
09	Chikkaballapura	Byrathi Suresh	Indian National Congress
10	Chikkamagaluru	K. J. George	Indian National Congress
11	Chitradurga	T. Raghumurthy	Indian National Congress
12	Dakshina Kannada	U. T. Khader	Indian National Congress
13	Davanagere	S. S. Mallikarjun	Indian National Congress
14	Dharwad	Santosh Lad	Indian National Congress
15	Gadag	Basavaraj Rayareddy	Indian National Congress
16	Kalaburagi	Priyank Kharge	Indian National Congress
17	Hassan	K. M. Shivalinge Gowda	Indian National Congress
18	Haveri	Rudrappa Lamani	Indian National Congress
19	Kodagu	P. M. Narendraswamy	Indian National Congress
20	Kolar	Ramalinga Reddy	Indian National Congress
21	Koppal	Shivaraj Tangadagi	Indian National Congress
22	Mandya	N. Chaluvaraya Swamy	Indian National Congress
23	Mysuru	Yathindra Siddaramaiah	Indian National Congress
24	Raichur	Ajay Singh	Indian National Congress
25	Bengaluru South	H. C. Balakrishna	Indian National Congress
26	Shivamogga	Madhu Bangarappa	Indian National Congress
27	Tumakuru	G. Parameshwara	Indian National Congress
28	Udupi	Rizwan Arshad	Indian National Congress
29	Uttara Kannada	Laxman Savadi	Indian National Congress
30	Vijayanagara	K. S. Basavanthappa	Indian National Congress
31	Yadgir	Sharan Prakash Patil	

== Administrative divisions ==
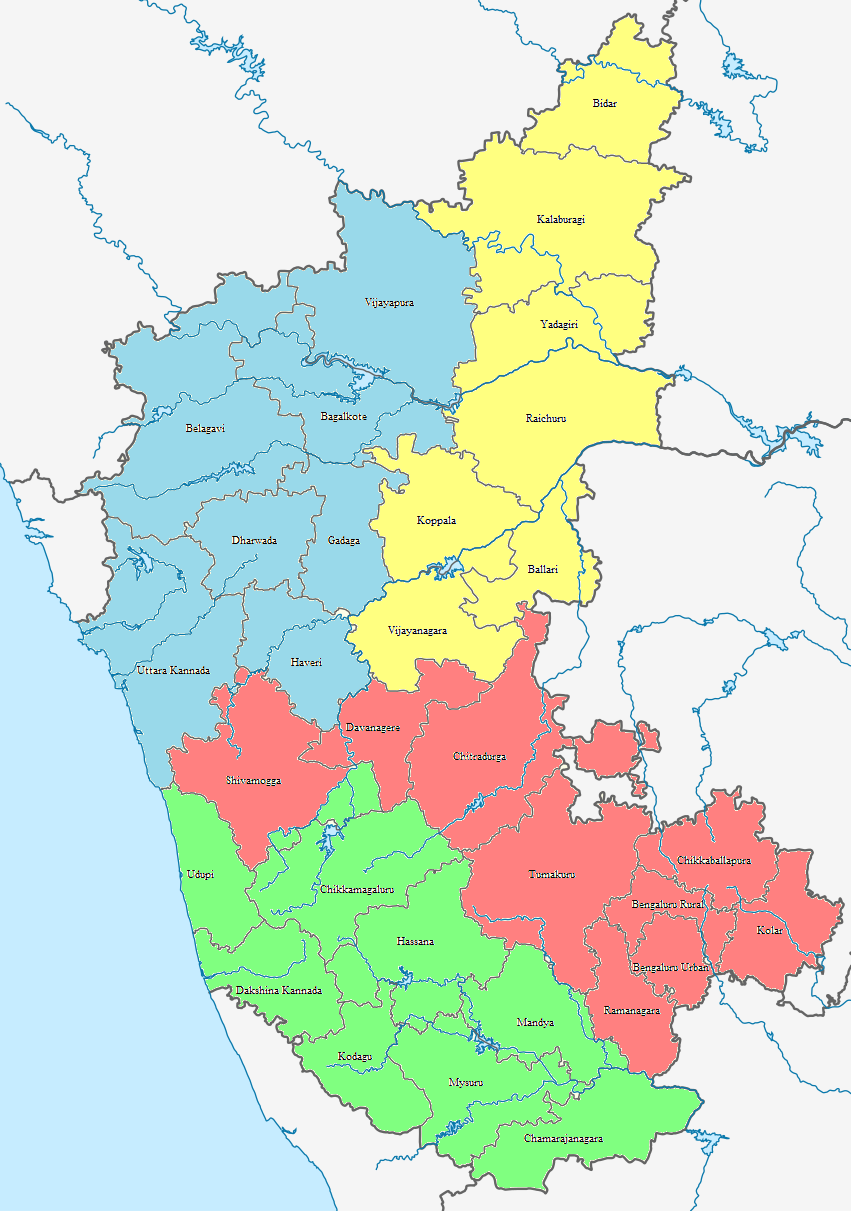
4 Divisions and 31 Districts of Karnataka

Karnataka State is divided into four revenue divisions and 31 districts, which are subdivided into revenue sub-divisions, taluks, hoblis (revenue circles) and villages for land revenue administrative purposes.

=== Revenue administration ===
The state is divided into four administrative divisions for land revenue administration—Bengaluru, Mysuru, Belagavi, and Kalaburagi—each headed by a Regional Commissioner (formerly known as Divisional Commissioner, a senior IAS officer). Each division comprises multiple districts.

These divisions are subdivided into districts, each administered by a Deputy Commissioner (DC), an IAS officer. There are a total of 31 districts in the state. Within a district, there are one or more revenue sub-divisions, overseen by an Assistant Commissioner. The Assistant Commissioners are designated as the Sub-Divisional Officers and Sub-Divisional Magistrates of the sub-division.

Each sub-division contains multiple taluks, administered by Tahsildars. Taluks are further divided into Hoblis, which are clusters of villages managed by Revenue Inspectors. At the grassroots level, each village is the smallest administrative unit and is managed by a Village Accountant.

=== Local government institutions ===
In Karnataka, rural governance is managed through a three-tier Panchayati Raj system: Gram Panchayats at the village level, Taluk Panchayats at the taluk level, and Zilla Panchayats at the district level. These bodies collectively form the Panchayati Raj Institutions, responsible for local self-governance and rural development. See #Karnataka Panchayat Raj.

Urban governance in Karnataka is administered through Urban Local Bodies (ULBs), which are classified according to the population and size of the urban area: city corporations, city municipal councils, town municipal councils, and town panchayats (see #Urban Local Governance).

==== Greater Bengaluru ====
Bengaluru was governed by the Bruhat Bengaluru Mahanagara Palike (BBMP) until September 2025, when it was replaced under the Greater Bengaluru Governance Act, 2024 by the Greater Bengaluru Authority (GBA), an apex body that coordinates five new city corporations—Central, North, South, East and West. The five corporations have 369 wards in total. No elected councils exist yet: the BBMP's elected term ended in 2020, and the Supreme Court of India has repeatedly extended the deadline for polls to the new corporations, most recently on 17 July 2026 to 31 December 2026, citing the Special Intensive Revision of electoral rolls in Karnataka, which was expected to conclude only in November, and warning that no further extension would be granted. In the Shivakumar ministry, the Greater Bengaluru Development portfolio is held by Krishna Byre Gowda, while the Chief Minister retains the urban local bodies under the Bangalore Development Authority and Bangalore Metropolitan Region Development Authority areas.

=== Political and administrative reorganization ===
Karnataka took its present shape in 1956, when the states of Mysore and Coorg (Kodagu) were merged with the Kannada-speaking districts of the former states of Bombay and Hyderabad, and Madras. Mysore state was made up of 10 districts: Bangalore, Kolar, Tumkur, Mandya, Mysore, Hassan, Chikmagalur (Kadur), Shimoga and Chitradurga; Bellary was transferred from Madras state to Mysore in 1953, when the new Andhra State was created out of Madras' northern districts. Kodagu became a district, and Dakshina Kannada (South Kanara) district was transferred from Madras state, Uttara Kannada (North Kanara), Dharwad, Belgaum District, and Bijapur District from Bombay state, and Bidar District, Kalaburgi District, and Raichur District from Hyderabad state.

In 1989, Bangalore Rural district was carved out of Bangalore district. In 1997, Bagalkot district was carved out of Vijayapura district, Chamrajnagar out of Mysore, Gadag out of Dharwad, Haveri out of Dharwad, Koppal out of Raichur, Udupi out of Dakshina Kannada and Yadgir out of Kalaburagi. Davanagere district was created from parts of Bellary, Chitradurga, Dharwad and Shimoga. In 2020, Vijayanagara district was carved out of Ballari district, to become the 31st district in the state. As a result, the world heritage site of Hampi, the erstwhile capital of Vijayanagara empire, is now part of a new district - Vijayanagara.

On 23 May 2025 the state government renamed Ramanagara district as Bengaluru South district; Ramanagara remains its headquarters, and the district comprises the Magadi, Kanakapura, Channapatna and Harohalli taluks.

== Legislature ==
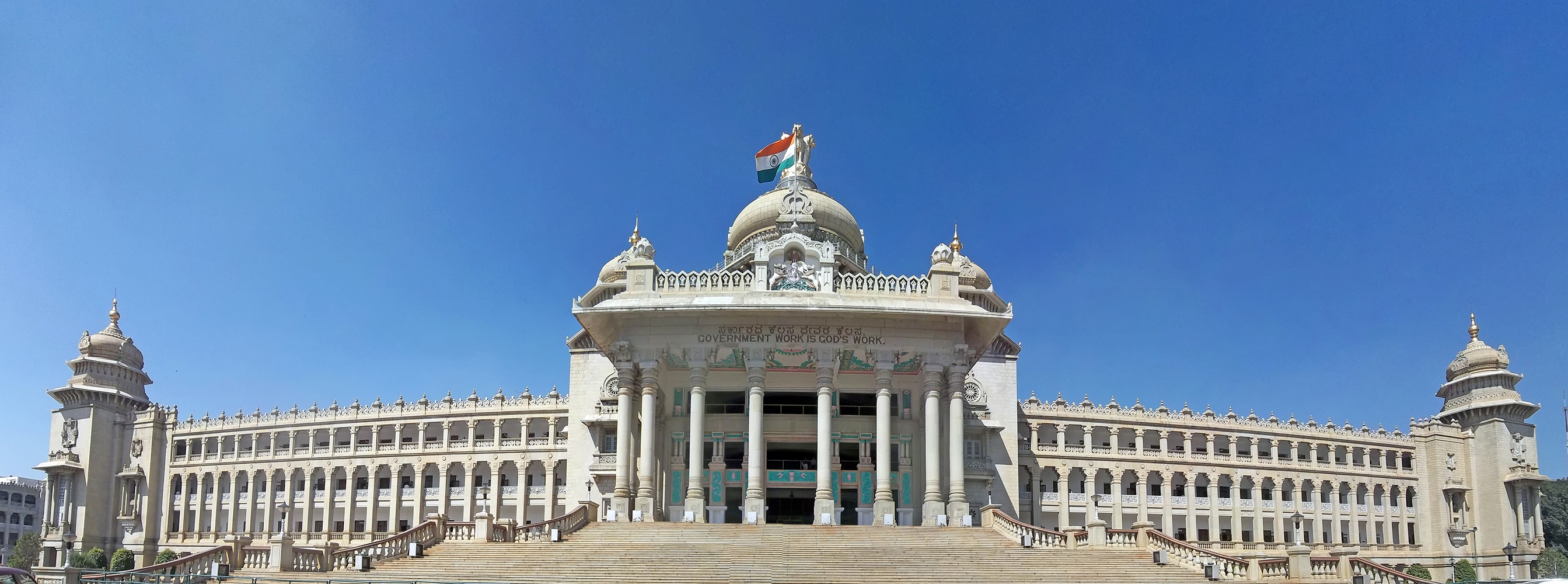
The Suvarna Vidhana Soudha

The state legislature is bicameral and consists of the Legislative Assembly and the Legislative Council. The Legislative Assembly consists of 224 elected members. The term of office of the members is five years and the term of a member elected to the council is six years. The Legislative Council is a permanent body with one-third of its members retiring every two years. Of its 75 members, 25 are elected by members of the Legislative Assembly, 25 by local authorities, 7 by graduates and 7 by teachers, and 11 are nominated by the governor.

The current (16th) Legislative Assembly was elected in the May 2023 election; the next election is due by May 2028. In August 2026 both houses elected new presiding officers: G. S. Patil was elected Speaker on 14 August, the opposition BJP and JD(S) boycotting the vote, and Saleem Ahmed was elected Chairperson of the Council on the same day; Mankala Vaidya and Umashree were elected Deputy Speaker and Deputy Chairperson unopposed on 18 August.

== Ministry ==
The government is headed by the governor who appoints the chief minister and their council of ministers. The governor is appointed for five years and acts as the constitutional head of the state. Even though the governor remains the ceremonial head of the state, the day-to-day running of the government is taken care of by the chief minister and their council of ministers in whom a great deal of legislative powers is vested.

The secretariat headed by the secretary to the governor assists the council of ministers. The council of ministers consists of cabinet ministers, ministers of state and deputy ministers. The chief minister is assisted by the chief secretary, who is the head of the administrative services; Shalini Rajneesh, a 1989-batch IAS officer, took charge of the post on 31 July 2024.

The Shivakumar ministry was sworn in on 3 June 2026 with the Chief Minister, the Deputy Chief Minister and 12 other ministers. It was expanded on 3 August 2026, when 19 more ministers took the oath at the Governor's official residence, taking the council to 33 members, one short of the sanctioned strength of 34; the one woman on the list of 20 names cleared by the party high command, MLC Gayathri Shanthegowda, was not sworn in, leaving the council without a woman minister. Portfolios for the new ministers were notified by the Governor on 12 August 2026. On 28 August 2026 the Planning and Statistics Minister, B. Nagendra, resigned over the Valmiki Corporation case, and the Governor accepted his resignation on the Chief Minister's advice, leaving the council with 32 members and two vacancies.

=== Chief Minister ===
The Chief Minister of Karnataka is the chief executive of the Indian state of Karnataka. As per the Constitution of India, the governor is a state's de jure head, but de facto executive authority rests with the chief minister. Following elections to the Karnataka Legislative Assembly, the state's governor usually invites the party (or coalition) with a majority of seats to form the government. The governor appoints the chief minister, whose council of ministers are collectively responsible to the assembly. Given that he has the confidence of the assembly, the chief minister's term is for five years and is subject to no term limits.

== Karnataka Panchayat Raj ==
This is a 3-tier system in the state with elected bodies at the village (grama), taluka and district (zilla) levels. It ensures greater participation of people and effective implementation of rural development programs. There is a Grama Panchayat for a village (grama) or a group of villages (gramas), a Taluka Panchayat at the taluka level and a Zilla Panchayat at the district (zilla) level.

All the 3 institutions are made up of elected representatives and there is no provision for nomination by the governor to any of these councils. Karnataka was the first state in the country to enact the Panchayat Raj Act, incorporating all provisions of the 73rd Amendment to the Constitution.

The last elections to the Zilla and Taluk Panchayats were held in 2016, and their five-year terms ended on 4 May 2021; polls have not been held since because of legal challenges to the delimitation of constituencies and the reservation of seats, and the bodies have no elected members. The terms of the state's 5,943 Gram Panchayats ended in January and February 2026. The Rural Development and Panchayat Raj Department issued fresh reservation notifications for the Zilla and Taluk Panchayats in a special gazette dated 7 October 2026, which cancelled earlier notifications, and the government has said it aims to hold the elections by the end of December 2026; the Rural Development Minister has indicated the polls are likely in the first week of January 2027, with Gram Panchayat polls to follow.

In 2014, Karnataka State Grama Panchayats Delimitation Committee was constituted by the government of Karnataka, with Chairman S G Nanjaiahna Mutt and 6 members. The joint secretary of the committee was Dr. Revaiah Odeyar. The report was submitted on 30 October 2014. This resulted in the implementation of Gram Panchayat elections in 2015.

The Karnataka Panchayat Administrative Service (KPAS) is the civil service of the state's rural development and panchayat raj administration; it was constituted under the Karnataka Gram Swaraj and Panchayat Raj Act, 1993, as amended by Act 44 of 2015 with effect from 25 February 2016. The Rural Development and Panchayat Raj Department conducts exams to recruit candidates for the service. KPAS officers are usually appointed as Panchayat Development Officers (PDOs), and are trained at the Abdul Nazeer Sab State Institute of Rural Development and Panchayat Raj (ANSSIRDPR), Mysuru.

== Urban Local Governance ==
Urban areas in Karnataka are governed by different municipal bodies: city corporations, city municipal councils, town municipal councils, town panchayats and notified area committees. as of 2020, the Directorate of Municipal Administration listed 10 municipal corporations, 59 city municipal councils, 116 town municipal councils, 97 town panchayats and 4 notified area committees; these figures pre-date the replacement of the BBMP by five Greater Bengaluru city corporations in 2025. The municipal corporations are administered under the Karnataka Municipal Corporations Act, 1976, while the rest are under the Karnataka Municipalities Act, 1964. Bengaluru is governed under the Greater Bengaluru Governance Act, 2024 (see #Greater Bengaluru), while the Directorate of Municipal Administration oversees the other urban local governments in Karnataka. The categorisation of urban areas is done on the following basis:

Categorisation of Urban Areas in Karnataka
Type	Type of Governing Body	Population Criteria	Density Criteria	Revenue Criteria	Economic Criteria
Transitory Areas	Town Panchayat	10,000 to 20,000, or a Taluka Headquarter is located in such area	not less than 400 inhabitants to one square kilometer of area	-	percentage of employment in non-agricultural activities is not less than 50% of the total employment
Smaller Urban Areas	Town Municipal Council	20,000 to 50,000	not less than 1,500 inhabitants to one square kilometer of area	revenue generated for local administration from such area from tax and non-tax sources in the year of the last preceding census is not less than ₹9 lakhs per annum or a sum calculated at the rate of ₹45 per capita per annum, whichever is higher	percentage of employment in non-agricultural activities is not less than 50% of the total employment
Smaller Urban Areas	City Municipal Council	50,000 to 3,00,000	not less than 1,500 inhabitants to one square kilometer of area	revenue generated for local administration from such area from tax and non-tax sources in the year of the last preceding census is not less than ₹9 lakhs per annum or a sum calculated at the rate of ₹45 per capita per annum, whichever is higher	percentage of employment in non-agricultural activities is not less than 50% of the total employment
Larger Urban Areas	City Municipal Corporation	3,00,000 and above	not less than 3,000 inhabitants to one square kilo meter of area	revenue generated from such area for the local administration in the year of the last preceding census is not less than ₹6 crores per annum or an amount calculated at the rate of ₹200 per capita per annum, whichever is higher	percentage of employment in non-agricultural activities is not less than 50% of the total employment

The Karnataka Municipal Corporations Act, 1976 mandates constituting both Ward Committees and Area Sabha in each corporation. The rules for setting these up are given in Karnataka Municipal Corporations (Wards Committees) Rules, 2016. Ward Committees in the state have been defunct in cities where they have been formed, with the meetings being erratic or not publicised to the ward members. Since the provision for setting up Ward Committees was only given in the municipal act meant for municipal corporations, only cities with population of 3 lakh or more were mandated to form them. In January 2020, the Urban Development Department of the Karnataka Government announced that Ward Committees would be formed in all urban local bodies in the state, irrespective of their population.

== District administration ==
A district of an Indian state is an administrative unit headed by a deputy commissioner or district magistrate, an officer belonging to the Indian Administrative Service. The district magistrate or the deputy commissioner is assisted by a number of officers belonging to Karnataka Civil Service and other Karnataka state services.

A Superintendent of Police, an officer belonging to the Indian Police Service is entrusted with the responsibility of maintaining law and order and related issues of the district. The District SP is assisted by the officers of the Karnataka Police Service and other Karnataka Police officials. A Deputy Conservator of Forests, an officer belonging to the Indian Forest Service, is responsible for managing the forests, environment and wildlife related issues of the district. He is assisted by the officers of the Karnataka Forest Service and other Karnataka forest and wildlife officials. Sectoral development is looked after by the district head of each development department such as PWD, Health, Education, Agriculture, Animal husbandry, etc. These officers belong to the State Services.

== Police Administration ==
The state police has police commissionerates at Bengaluru, Mysuru, Mangaluru, Belagavi, Hubballi–Dharwad and Kalaburagi, and is organised into police districts, sub-divisions, circles and stations, with ranges headed by Inspectors General. The Government Railway Police is headed by an ADGP.

Units that assist the state in law and order include Criminal Investigation Department (Forest Cell, Anti-Dowry Cell, etc.), Dog Squad, Civil Rights Enforcement Wing, Police Wireless and Police Motor Transport Organization and special units. Village Defence Parties protect persons and property in the village and assist the police when necessary. The police force is at times supplemented by Home Guards.

== Politics ==
Karnataka politics is dominated by the Indian National Congress (INC), Bharatiya Janata party (BJP) and Janata Dal (Secular).

In the election held on 10 May 2023, the Indian National Congress won 135 of the 224 seats, the Bharatiya Janata Party 66 and the Janata Dal (Secular) 19, and Siddaramaiah became chief minister on 20 May 2023 with D. K. Shivakumar as deputy chief minister. Siddaramaiah resigned as chief minister at the end of May 2026, and Shivakumar was sworn in on 3 June 2026 with G. Parameshwara as deputy chief minister. The next Assembly election is due by May 2028. In September 2026 Shivakumar called for the Election Commission's ongoing Special Intensive Revision of electoral rolls in the state to be scrapped and redone, and for Chief Election Commissioner Gyanesh Kumar to resign; the Supreme Court has cited the exercise, expected to conclude in November, in extending the deadline for the Bengaluru civic polls.

Previously, in the 2018 Assembly Election, BJP emerged as single largest party with 104 seats leaving behind INC with 79, JDS with 38, BSP with 1 and other 2 independent seats. While B. S. Yeddyurappa went ahead with the intention of making the government and requested the governor to allow him to form a government without the numbers though. Governor allowed him to take oath as Chief Minister on 17 May 2018 although his happiness was short-lived, as SC struck down 2 weeks of time provided by the governor for the floor test to just 2 days. He was forced to resign unable to prove the majority. After his resignation H. D. Kumaraswamy was sworn in as the Chief Minister on 23 May 2018 with absolute majority support from Congress total of 117.

In later bypolls JDS+Congress combine won 4 out of 5 seats 3MP & 2 MLA seats making the numbers up by 119.

On 23 July 2019 the government headed by H. D. Kumaraswamy fell short of majority in the trust vote due to the resignation of 17 MLAs from the Congress and the JDS.

B. S. Yeddiyurappa once again took oath as the chief minister for the 4th time on 26 July 2019.

=== Elections ===
Last assembly elections: 2023 Karnataka Legislative Assembly election
Next assembly elections: due by May 2028
Greater Bengaluru city corporation elections: to be held by 31 December 2026 (2026 Greater Bengaluru Authority elections)

== See also ==
- Karnataka
- List of chief ministers of Karnataka
- Shivakumar ministry
- Greater Bengaluru Authority
- 2019 Karnataka political crisis
