= KPSC =

KPSC may refer to:

- The ICAO code for Tri-Cities Airport (Washington)
- KPSC (FM), a radio station (88.5 FM) licensed to Palm Springs, California, United States
- Kerala Public Service Commission
- Karnataka Public Service Commission, a staff selection commission for Government of Karnataka, India
- Knot density: knots per square centimeter
