= List of leaders of the opposition in the Karnataka Legislative Council =

Head of Opposition in upper house

Leader of the Opposition of Karnataka Legislative Council
- Karnāṭaka Vidhāna Pariṣattinalli Virōdha Pakṣada Nāyaka
- Emblem of Karnataka

- Flag of India
- Incumbent; Chalavadi Narayanaswamy since 4 June 2024
- Karnataka Legislative Council
- Style: The Honourable
- Status: Leader of Opposition
- Member of: Karnataka Legislative Council
- Nominator: Members of the Official Opposition in the Karnataka Legislative Council
- Appointer: Chairperson of Karnataka Legislative Council
- Term length: During the life of the Karnataka Legislative Council (5 years)
- Inaugural holder: G. V. Anjanappa
- Formation: 28 January 1969; 57 years ago
- Website: https://kla.kar.nic.in/council/council.htm Karnataka Legislative Council

The leader of the opposition in the Karnataka Legislative Council is an elected Member of Karnataka Legislative Council who leads the official opposition in the upper house of the Karnataka Legislature. The leader of the opposition in the Karnataka Legislative Council is the Legislature chairperson of the party with the most seats after the government party.

== Leaders of opposition ==
#	Portrait	Name	Constituency	Tenure			Party
Mysore
1		G. V. Anjanappa	Bangalore Graduate	28 January 1969	11 June 1970	1 year, 134 days	Praja Socialist Party
2		A. H. Shivananda Swamy	elected by MLAs	25 September 1970	14 March 1971	170 days	Praja Socialist Party
3		Balakrishna Gowda	elected by MLAs	15 March 1971	15 August 1972	1 year, 153 days	Indian National Congress (R)
4		Ramakrishna Hegde	elected by MLAs	16 August 1972	31 October 1973	1 year, 76 days	Indian National Congress (O)
Karanataka
(4)		Ramakrishna Hegde	elected by MLAs	1 November 1973	1 February 1976	2 years, 92 days	Indian National Congress (O)
5		S. R. Bommai	Dharwad Local Authorities	3 February 1976	17 March 1978	2 years, 43 days	Indian National Congress (O)
6		A.K.Subbaiah		18 March 1978	23 January 1980	1 year, 311 days	Janata Party
7		D. B. Chandregowda	elected by MLAs	24 January 1980	24 June 1981	1 year, 173 days	Indian National Congress (U)
7		D. B. Chandregowda	elected by MLAs	27 June 1981	16 July 1981	1 year, 173 days	Indian National Congress (U)
8		M. C. Perumal	elected by MLAs	15 February 1982	29 July 1982	330 days	Indian Congress (S)
8		M. C. Perumal	elected by MLAs	30 July 1982	11 January 1983	330 days	Indian Congress (S)
9		T. N. Narasimha Murthy	elected by MLAs	30 June 1983	28 July 1986	5 years, 355 days	Indian National Congress (I)
9		T. N. Narasimha Murthy	elected by MLAs	29 July 1986	20 June 1989	5 years, 355 days	Indian National Congress (I)
10		M.C. Nanaiah	elected by MLAs	18 December 1989	13 May 1992	4 years, 357 days	Janata Dal
10		M.C. Nanaiah	elected by MLAs	14 May 1992	10 December 1994	4 years, 357 days	Janata Dal
11		H. K. Patil	West; Graduates	27 December 1994	30 June 1996	4 years, 293 days	Indian National Congress
11		H. K. Patil	West; Graduates	1 July 1996	16 October 1999	4 years, 293 days	Indian National Congress
12		K. H. Srinivas	Nominated	29 October 1999	8 July 2002	2 years, 252 days	Janata Dal (Secular)
13		D. H. Shankaramurthy	South West; Graduates	8 July 2002	16 June 2004	3 years, 138 days	Bharatiya Janata Party
13		D. H. Shankaramurthy	South West; Graduates	16 June 2004	23 November 2005	3 years, 138 days	Bharatiya Janata Party
(11)		H. K. Patil	West; Graduates	24 February 2006	17 January 2008	1 year, 327 days	Indian National Congress
14		V. S. Ugrappa	Tumakuru Local Authorities	8 April 2008	1 May 2010	2 years, 23 days	Indian National Congress
15		Motamma	elected by MLAs	1 September 2010	17 June 2012	1 year, 290 days	Indian National Congress
16		S. R. Patil	Vijayapura Local Authorities	28 June 2012	13 May 2013	319 days	Indian National Congress
17		Sadananda Gowda	elected by MLAs	17 May 2013	24 May 2014	1 year, 7 days	Bharatiya Janata Party
18		K. S. Eshwarappa	elected by MLAs	13 July 2014	17 May 2018	3 years, 308 days	Bharatiya Janata Party
19		Kota Srinivas Poojary	Dakshina Kannada Local Authorities	2 July 2018	26 July 2019	1 year, 24 days	Bharatiya Janata Party
(16)		S. R. Patil	Vijayapura Local Authorities	10 October 2019	5 January 2022	2 years, 87 days	Indian National Congress
20		B. K. Hariprasad	elected by MLAs	26 January 2022	20 May 2023	1 year, 114 days	Indian National Congress
(19)		Kota Srinivas Poojary	Dakshina Kannada Local Authorities	25 December 2023	4 June 2024	162 days	Bharatiya Janata Party
21		Chaluvadi Narayanaswamy	elected by MLAs	29 June 2024	Incumbent	2 years, 90 days	Bharatiya Janata Party
