= Chairperson of the Karnataka Legislative Council =

Presiding officer of the upper house of the Karnataka Legislature, India

Chairman of Karnataka Legislative Council
- Karnāṭaka Vidhāna Pariṣattina Adhyaksharu
- Emblem of Karnataka

- Flag of India

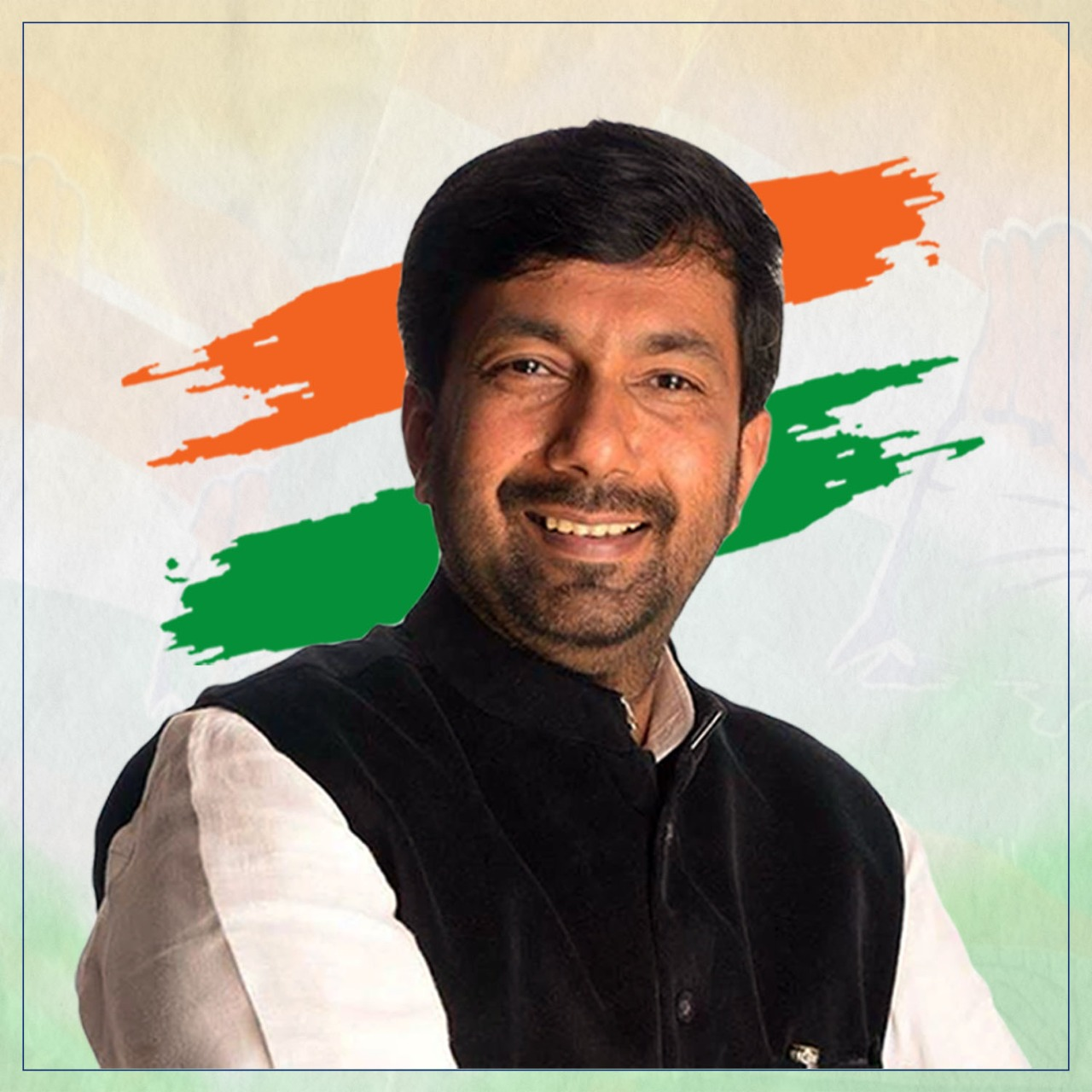
- Incumbent; Saleem Ahmed since 14 August 2026
- Karnataka Legislative Council
- Type: Chairman
- Status: Presiding Officer of Karnataka Legislative Council
- Member of: Karnataka Legislative Council
- Reports to: Governor of Karnataka
- Appointer: Members of the Karnataka Legislative Council
- Term length: 6 Years
- Constituting instrument: Article 182 of Indian Constitution
- Inaugural holder: K. T. Bhashyam (Mysuru State); S. D. Gaonkar (Karnataka)
- Deputy: Umashree
- Website: Karnataka Legislative Council

The state of Karnataka in India

The chairperson of the Karnataka Legislative Council is the presiding officer of the Karnataka Legislative Council, the main law-making body for the Indian state of Karnataka. The chairperson is elected by the members of the Karnataka Legislative Council (until 1973, the Mysore Legislative Council). The chairperson is usually a member of the Legislative Council.

== List of chairpersons ==
Mysore was renamed to Karnataka on 1 November 1973.

Sl. No.	Name	Portrait	Tenure			Party
Mysore State
1.	K. T. Bhashyam		17 June 1952	24 May 1956	3 years, 342 days	Indian National Congress
2.	T. Subramanya		25 September 1956	1 November 1956	37 days	
2.	T. Subramanya		19 December 1956	31 March 1957	102 days	
3.	P. Seetharamaiah		10 June 1957	13 May 1958	337 days	
4.	V. Venkatappa		5 November 1958	13 May 1960	1 year, 190 days	
5.	K. V. Narasappa		30 August 1960	13 May 1962	1 year, 256 days	
–	H. F. Kattimani (Pro tem)		30 June 1962	3 July 1962	3 days	
6.	G. V. Hallikeri		3 July 1962	13 May 1966	3 years, 314 days	
–	Mahanta Shetty (Acting)		20 June 1966	28 July 1966	8 days	
7.	S. C. Edke		28 July 1966	10 June 1968	1 year, 318 days	
–	R. B. Naik (Acting)		16 August 1968	5 September 1968	20 days	Indian National Congress
8.	K. K. Shetty		5 September 1968	18 May 1970	1 year, 255 days	Indian National Congress
–	K. Subb Rao (Acting)		16 September 1970	23 September 1970	7 days	
9.	R. B. Naik		26 September 1970	26 November 1970	61 days	Indian National Congress
10.	G. V. Hallikeri		26 December 1970	15 May 1971	140 days	
11.	S. D. Gaonkar		10 April 1972	31 October 1973	1 year, 204 days	
Karnataka
1	S. D. Gaonkar		1 November 1973	13 May 1974	193 days	
2	M. V. Venkatappa		30 August 1974	30 June 1978	3 years, 304 days	Indian National Congress
3	S. Shivappa		10 August 1978	14 May 1980	1 year, 278 days	
4	T. V. Venkataswamy (Acting)		15 May 1980	12 June 1980	28 days	
5	Basavarajeshwari		12 June 1980	11 June 1982	1 year, 364 days	Indian National Congress
6	Shantamallappa Patil (Acting)		11 June 1982	30 June 1982	19 days	
7	K. Rahman Khan		30 June 1982	30 June 1984	2 years, 0 days	Indian National Congress
8	R. B. Potadar (Acting)		1 July 1984	26 March 1985	268 days	
9	Channabasavaiah (Acting)		26 March 1985	8 April 1985	1 year, 13 days	
10	R. B. Potadar		8 April 1985	26 April 1987	2 years, 18 days	
11	S. Mallikarjunaiah (Acting)		26 April 1987	2 September 1987	129 days	
12	D. Manjunath		2 September 1987	13 May 1992	4 years, 254 days	Janata Party
13	B. R. Patil (Acting)		14 May 1992	16 January 1993	247 days	
14	D. B. Kalmankar		16 January 1993	17 June 1994	1 year, 152 days	
15	B. R. Patil (Acting)		17 June 1994	7 July 1994	20 days	
16	T. N. Narasimha Murthy (Pro tem)		7 July 1994	26 August 1994	50 days	
17	D. B. Kalmankar		26 August 1994	17 June 2000	5 years, 296 days	
18	David Simeon (Acting)		18 June 2000	5 August 2001	1 year, 48 days	
19	B. L. Shankar		6 August 2001	14 February 2004	2 years, 192 days	Janata Dal
20	V. R. Sudarshan (Acting)		14 February 2004	16 March 2005	1 year, 30 days	Indian National Congress
(20)	V. R. Sudarshan		17 March 2005	17 June 2006	1 year, 92 days	Indian National Congress
21	Koth Sachidananda (Acting)		18 June 2006	5 April 2007	291 days	Janata Dal (Secular)
22	B. K. Chandrashekar		5 April 2007	30 June 2008	1 year, 86 days	Indian National Congress
23	N. Thippanna (Acting)		1 July 2008	5 August 2008	35 days	Janata Dal (Secular)
24	Veeranna Mathikatti		5 August 2008	5 July 2010	1 year, 334 days	Indian National Congress
25	D. H. Shankaramurthy		5 July 2010	21 June 2012	1 year, 352 days	Bharatiya Janata Party
26	M. V. Rajasekharan (Pro tem)		22 June 2012	27 June 2012	5 days	Indian National Congress
27	D. H. Shankaramurthy		28 June 2012	21 June 2018	5 years, 358 days	Bharatiya Janata Party
28	Basavaraj Horatti		22 June 2018	12 December 2018	173 days	Janata Dal (Secular)
29	K. Prathapachandra Shetty		12 December 2018	4 February 2021	2 years, 54 days	Indian National Congress
(28)	Basavaraj Horatti		9 February 2021	17 May 2022	1 year, 97 days	Janata Dal (Secular)
30	Raghunath Rao Malkapure (Acting)		17 May 2022	21 December 2022	218 days	Bharatiya Janata Party
(28)	Basavaraj Horatti		21 December 2022	7 August 2026	3 years, 229 days	Bharatiya Janata Party
31	Puttanna (Acting)		7 August 2026	14 August 2026	7 days	Indian National Congress
32	Saleem Ahmed		14 August 2026	Incumbent	39 days	Indian National Congress

== List of deputy chairpersons ==
#	Name	Tenure			Party
Mysore State
1	P. Gopalkrishna Shetty	23 July 1952	13 May 1956	3 years, 295 days	Indian National Congress
2	L. H. Thimmabovi	29 September 1956	1 November 1956	33 days	Indian National Congress
3	Mahadevappa Rampure	26 December 1956	31 March 1957	95 days	Indian National Congress
4	K. Kanatappa Shetty	18 June 1957	18 May 1958	334 days	Indian National Congress
5	Keshavarao Nitturkar	19 November 1958	30 June 1960	1 year, 224 days	Indian National Congress
6	B. J. Deshpande	3 December 1960	10 June 1962	1 year, 189 days	Indian National Congress
7	M. R. Lakshmamma	9 July 1962	13 May 1964	1 year, 309 days	Indian National Congress
8	H. F. Kattimani	2 July 1964	13 June 1966	1 year, 346 days	Indian National Congress
9	S. D. Gaonvkar	30 July 1966	13 May 1968	1 year, 288 days	Indian National Congress
10	M. Mandayya	12 September 1968	18 May 1970	1 year, 248 days	Indian National Congress
11	S. P. Rajanna	15 October 1970	30 June 1972	1 year, 259 days	Indian National Congress
12	T. N. Narasimhamurty	5 August 1972	31 October 1973	1 year, 87 days	Indian National Congress
Karnataka (Note: Mysore was renamed to Karnataka on 1 November 1973.)
1	T. N. Narasimhamurthy	1 November 1973	4 April 1975	1 year, 154 days	Indian National Congress
1	T. N. Narasimhamurthy	29 April 1975	11 June 1976	1 year, 43 days	Indian National Congress
2	R. G. Jagirdar	17 November 1976	14 May 1980	3 years, 179 days	Indian National Congress
3	V. S. Krishna Iyer	18 June 1980	11 June 1982	1 year, 358 days	Janata Party
4	A. B. Malaka Reddy	19 July 1982	30 June 1984	1 year, 347 days	Independent politician
5	S. Mallikarjunaiah	10 April 1985	30 June 1990	5 years, 81 days	Bharatiya Janata Party
5	S. Mallikarjunaiah	12 July 1990	2 July 1991	355 days	Bharatiya Janata Party
6	B. R. Patil	5 September 1991	7 July 1994	2 years, 305 days	Janata Dal
7	Rani Satish	29 August 1994	13 May 1998	3 years, 257 days	Indian National Congress
8	David Simeon	1 April 1999	4 December 2002	3 years, 247 days	Janata Dal (Secular)
9	V. R. Sudarshan	8 July 2003	17 March 2005	1 year, 252 days	Indian National Congress
10	Sachidananda L. Khot	31 March 2005	30 June 2008	3 years, 91 days	Janata Dal (Secular)
11	Puttanna	21 January 2009	14 January 2011	1 year, 358 days	Janata Dal (Secular)
12	Vimala Gowda	17 October 2011	17 June 2012	244 days	Bharatiya Janata Party
12	Vimala Gowda	20 July 2012	7 October 2014	2 years, 79 days	Bharatiya Janata Party
(11)	Puttanna	15 July 2014	30 July 2015	1 year, 15 days	Janata Dal (Secular)
13	Maritibbe Gowda	1 August 2015	21 June 2018	2 years, 324 days	Janata Dal (Secular)
14	S. L. Dharmegowda	19 December 2018	28 December 2020	2 years, 9 days	Janata Dal (Secular)
15	M. K. Pranesh	29 January 2021	1 August 2026	5 years, 184 days	Bharatiya Janata Party
16	Umashree	18 August 2026	Incumbent	35 days	Indian National Congress

== See also ==
- Chief Ministers of Karnataka
- Karnataka Legislature
