= Mohan Joshi (spiritual leader) =

Indian spiritual leader (born 1950)

- Born: Mohan Joshi; 27 April 1950 (age 75); Nagpur, India
- Website: healmohan.org

Mohan Joshi (born 27 April 1950) is an Indian spiritual leader.

== Biography ==
Joshi was born on 27 April 1950, in Nagpur. He holds a degree in humanities and has a banking background. In December 1996, the Faculty of Medical Studies at the Medicina Alternativa Institute, affiliated with the Open International University for Complementary Medicines, awarded him the honorary Doctor of Science degree in Colombo.

Joshi's approach to healing involves hand placement on affected areas, with reported outcomes varying in duration and effect. He emphasizes patience and an open-minded approach during his sessions. He has healed various notable individuals, including Dhirubhai Ambani, H. K. Patil, and Balram Jakhar.

In 2002, it was reported that Joshi worked as a spiritual healer for Sushant Singh Rajput.
