= Venkataswamy =

Venkataswamy may refer to:

== People ==
- B. Venkataswamy, Indian politician
- Dwaram Venkataswamy Naidu (1893–1964), Indian music violinist
- Govindappa Venkataswamy (1918–2006), Indian ophthalmologist
- Nandipaku Venkataswamy, Indian politician
- T. V. Venkataswamy, Indian politician
