= Pranesh (name) =

Pranesh may refer to:

- M. K. Pranesh (born 1963), Indian politician
- Pranesh M (born 2006), Indian chess grandmaster
- Pranesh Pillai, victim of Ishrat Jahan encounter killing
