= D. H. Shankaramurthy =

Indian politician

Chairman Karnataka Legislative Council
- In office 5 July 2010 – 21 June 2018
- Preceded by: Veeranna Mathikatti
- Succeeded by: Basavaraj Horatti

Deputy Chairman State Planning Board Government of Karnataka
- In office 9 June 2008 – 3 July 2010

Cabinet Minister Government of Karnataka
- In office 18 February 2006 – 8 October 2007
- Ministry: Term
- Minister of Higher Education: 18 February 2006 - 8 October 2007

List of leaders of the opposition in the Karnataka Legislative Council Karnataka Legislative Council
- In office 8 July 2002 – 23 November 2005
- Preceded by: K. H. Srinivas
- Succeeded by: H. K. Patil

Member of Karnataka Legislative Council
- In office 22 June 1988 – 21 June 2018
- Succeeded by: Ayanur Manjunath
- Constituency: Karnataka South-West Graduates

Chairman Karnataka Milk Federation
- In office 1984

Personal details
- Born: 30 April 1940 (age 85) Shimoga, Kingdom of Mysore
- Party: Bharatiya Janata Party
- Spouse: Sathyavati
- Children: 2
- Occupation: Politician

D. H. Shankaramurthy (born 30 April 1940) is a senior leader of the Bharatiya Janata Party (BJP) in Karnataka, India. He has been Chairman of the Karnataka Legislative Council since 2010.

== Biography ==
Shankaramurthy was born on 30 April 1940 to a Kannada-speaking family of Hanumanthappa and Kamakshamma in Shimoga. He graduated with a degree in Science from Bangalore University. He married Sathyavati and the couple has two sons, Kiran and Arun. His younger son Arun D S is presently Member of Karnataka Legislative Council representing local bodies from Shivamogga district. Previously he was the general secretary of Shimoga District BJP and was also nominated as Chairman of Karnataka Arya Vysya Development Corporation with the rank of Minister of State.”.

He is associated with the Rashtriya Swayamsevak Sangh (RSS), a Nationalist Social Organization since 1966. Later, he joined the erstwhile Bharatiya Jana Sangh and also, served as District General Secretary and State General Secretary of the party. He is an active member of the Dakshin Bharat Hindi Prachar Sabha and a strong advocate for making Hindi the sole National Language. He has vociferously championed for the spread and influence of Hindi in southern India. He actively participated in "Bangla Satyagraha" and underwent imprisonment in ‘Tihar Jail’ and a protege of former Prime Minister Atal Bihari Vajpayee. During the Emergency, he was detained under the Maintenance of Internal Security Act for 19 months in the prison at Belgaum. In 1980 he became the first state General Secretary of the BJP. He unsuccessfully contested the 1978 state elections and the 1980 general elections from Shimoga.

He was the Chairman of the Karnataka Milk Federation in 1984 and rendered yeomen service for the promotion of Milk and other dairy products.

For the first time he was elected as Member of Karnataka Legislative Council from the South West Graduates Constituency in 1988. Since then, he has been continuously elected for four more terms, in 1994, 2000, 2006 and 2012.

He was the Leader of the Opposition in the Legislative Council from 2002 to 2006. During this period, he discharged his responsibilities in a highly disciplined manner and upheld the prestige of the House.

In February 2006, he became a Cabinet Minister in the BJP-Janata Dal (Secular) coalition government and handled the prestigious Higher Education portfolio. He was instrumental in approving and starting of 184 Degree Colleges and thus bringing about a radical change in the educational infrastructure in the State and also, streamlined the Higher Education department to make it competitive and effective.

Following the victory of the BJP in Karnataka in May 2008, he was appointed as the Deputy Chairman of the State Planning Board (an Apex Advisory body of the Government). He oversaw the creation of a document called "Karnataka Vision - 2020" which gave a new direction to the all-round development of the State. Under his guidance, the SPB was restructured with more powers and responsibilities, along the lines of the Planning Commission of India.

He was unanimously elected as the Chairman of the Karnataka Legislative Council on 5 July 2010. He is hailed across party lines for his honesty, integrity and intellect and is one of the most respected leaders in the State.
