= Basavaraj Horatti =

Indian politician from Karnataka

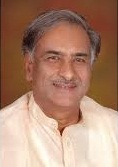

Chairperson of the Karnataka Legislative Council
- In office 21 December 2022 – 7 August 2026
- Deputy: M. K. Pranesh (until 2026); Vacant (since 2026)
- Leader of house: NS Boseraju
- Preceded by: Raghunath Rao Malkapure (acting)
- Succeeded by: Saleem Ahmed
- In office 9 February 2021 – 17 May 2022
- Preceded by: K. Prathapachandra Shetty
- Succeeded by: Raghunath Rao Malkapure (acting)
- In office 21 June 2018 - 12 December 2018
- Preceded by: D. H. Shankaramurthy
- Succeeded by: K. Prathapachandra Shetty

Minister of Primary & Secondary Education Government of Karnataka
- In office 18 February 2006 – 8 October 2007
- Chief Minister: H. D. Kumaraswamy
- Preceded by: Ramalinga Reddy
- Succeeded by: Vishweshwar Hegde Kageri

Minister of Law & Parliamentary Affairs Government of Karnataka
- In office 18 February 2006 – 21 June 2006
- Chief Minister: H. D. Kumaraswamy
- Preceded by: H. K. Patil
- Succeeded by: S. Suresh Kumar

Minister of Rural Development & Panchayat Raj Government of Karnataka
- In office 28 May 2004 – 2 February 2006
- Chief Minister: Dharam Singh
- Preceded by: M. Y. Ghorpade
- Succeeded by: C. M. Udasi

Member of Karnataka Legislative Council
- Incumbent
- Assumed office 1 July 1980
- Constituency: Karnataka West Teachers

Personal details
- Born: 14 April 1946 (age 80) Alagundi
- Party: Bharatiya Janata Party
- Education: B.A., M.P.Ed

Basavaraj Shivalingappa Horatti is an Indian politician who served as the Chairperson of the Karnataka Legislative Council from 21 December 2022 till August 2026, and its member since c. 1980. He has also previously once served as the Chairman of Karnataka Legislative Council from 9 February 2021 till 17 May 2022 and 21 June 2018 to 12 December 2018. He has been a longest-serving member of the Karnataka Legislative Council since 1980, winning eight consecutive terms.

Horatti had previously served as the Minister for Primary Education and Minister for Small Savings in the Government of Karnataka.
