= Puttanna =

Indian politician

Deputy Chairman of the Karnataka Legislative Council
- In office 15 July 2014 – 30 July 2015
- Preceded by: Vimala Gowda
- Succeeded by: Maritibbe Gowda
- In office 21 January 2009 – 14 January 2011
- Preceded by: Sachidananda L. Khot
- Succeeded by: Vimala Gowda

Member of the Karnataka Legislative Council
- In office 10 November 2020 – 9 March 2023
- Constituency: Bangalore Teachers

Personal details
- Born: 22 April 1966 (age 59) Kadankanahalli
- Party: Indian National Congress (Since 2023)
- Other political affiliations: Bharatiya Janata Party (2020 - 2023) Janata Dal (Secular) (Before 2020)
- Education: M.A. (History)
- Occupation: Agriculture & Social Service

Puttanna is an Indian politician who served as Deputy Chairperson of Karnataka Legislative Council. He regained the position in 2014 after losing it to Vimala Gowda in 2011.

== Personal life ==
He was born on 22 April 1966 in Kadankanahalli. He is a postgraduate in history.

== See also ==
- List of deputy chairmen of the Karnataka Legislative Council
