= Shivaraj Sajjanar =

Indian politician

Member of Karnataka Legislative Council
- In office 4 November 2008 – 5 April 2013
- Preceded by: Basavaraj Bommai
- Succeeded by: Nagaraj Chhabi
- Constituency: Dharwad Local Authorities

Member of Karnataka Legislative Assembly
- In office 2004–2008
- Preceded by: Basavaraj Shivannanavar
- Succeeded by: Neharu Olekar
- Constituency: Haveri

Personal details
- Born: Shivaraj Sajjanar; 18 July 1959 (age 67) Haveri district, Karnataka
- Spouse: Hema
- Parent: Sharanappa Sajjanar (father)
- Education: B.Sc, D.Pharma

Shivaraj Sharanappa Sajjanar is an Indian politician from the Bharatiya Janata Party who was the member of Karnataka Legislative Council representing Dharwad Local Authorities constituency.

== Political career ==
Shivaraj contested 2004 Karnataka election from Haveri and emerged victorious against Basavaraj Shivannanavar. However Haveri became a reserved seat after delimitation and hence he didn't contest 2008 Karnataka election. He was then elected to Karnataka Legislative Council from Dharwad Local Authorities after the seat fell vacant due to Basavaraj Bommai's election to Shiggaon (Assembly constituency). He quit the BJP and joined B. S. Yediyurappa led Karnataka Janata Paksha and contested from Byadgi seat in 2013 Karnataka election and lost to Basavaraj Shivannanavar of Indian National Congress. He was named BJP candidate for the by-polls to the Hangal (Vidhana Sabha constituency) which were necessitated after the death of the sitting MLA C. M. Udasi. He was defeated by Srinivas Mane of Congress by a margin of 7373 votes.
