= S. L. Dharmegowda =

Indian politician (1955–2020)

Deputy Chairman of the Karnataka Legislative Council
- In office 19 December 2018 – 29 December 2020
- Preceded by: Maritibbe Gowda
- Succeeded by: M. K. Pranesh

Member of the Karnataka Legislative Council
- In office 4 June 2018 – 29 December 2020
- Preceded by: Maritibbe Gowda
- Succeeded by: P. Muniraju Gowda

Member of Karnataka Legislative Assembly
- In office 2004 - 2007
- Preceded by: K. B. Mallikarjuna
- Succeeded by: Constituency ceased to exist
- Constituency: Birur

Personal details
- Born: 16 December 1955
- Died: 28 December 2020 (aged 65) Chikmagaluru taluka
- Cause of death: Under investigation
- Party: Janata Dal (Secular)

Sarapanahalli Lakshmaiah Dharme Gowda (16 December 1955 – 28 December 2020) was an Indian politician from Karnataka state, belonging to Janata Dal (Secular) party. He was Deputy Chairman and Member of the Karnataka Legislative Council.

== Death ==
On 29 December 2020, Dharme Gowda was found dead on a railway track in Karnataka’s Chikamagaluru district.

Police have found the suicide note which more likely looks like a Property Will wherein Dharme Gowda apologized to his mom and his wife, and recorded insights concerning his property and gave other monetary information, encouraging his relatives to finish the new house which was under construction. The case is currently under Investigation.
