= Maritibbe Gowda =

Indian politician

Marithibbe Gowda

Member of the Karnataka Legislative Council
- In office 22 June 2012 – 21 June 2024
- Succeeded by: K. Vivekananda
- Constituency: Karnataka South Teachers

Deputy Chairman of Karnataka Legislative Council
- In office 1 August 2015 – 21 June 2018
- Preceded by: Puttanna
- Succeeded by: S. L. Dharmegowda

Personal details
- Born: 1 July 1959 (age 66) Anche doddi
- Party: Indian National Congress (Since 2024)
- Other political affiliations: Janata Dal (Secular) (Before 2024)

Marithibbe Gowda (born 1 July 1959) is an Indian political leader who was the Deputy chairman of Karnataka Legislative Council from 1 August 2015 to 21 June 2018 (after death of Vimala Gowda) and he is current Member of the Karnataka Legislative Council from 22 June 2012.

== See also ==
· · ·
