= Raghunath Rao Malkapure =

Indian politician

Pro-tem Chairperson of the Karnataka Legislative Council
- In office 17 May 2022 – 21 Dec 2022
- Preceded by: Basavaraj Horatti
- Succeeded by: Basavaraj Horatti

Member of Karnataka Legislative Council
- In office 18 June 2012 – 17 June 2024
- Succeeded by: Ivan D'Souza
- Constituency: Elected by MLA

Personal details
- Born: Raghunath Rao Malkapure; 1 October 1959 (age 67) Malkapur
- Party: Bharatiya Janata Party
- Children: Pranay Malkapure

Raghunath Rao Narsappa Malkapure is an Indian politician who is the current member of the Karnataka Legislative Council from Bidar Constituency and also former Pro-tem Chairman of Karnataka Legislative council.

He also served as State President, Bharatiya Janata Yuva Morcha.
