= K. Prathapachandra Shetty =

Indian politician

K Prathapachandra Shetty
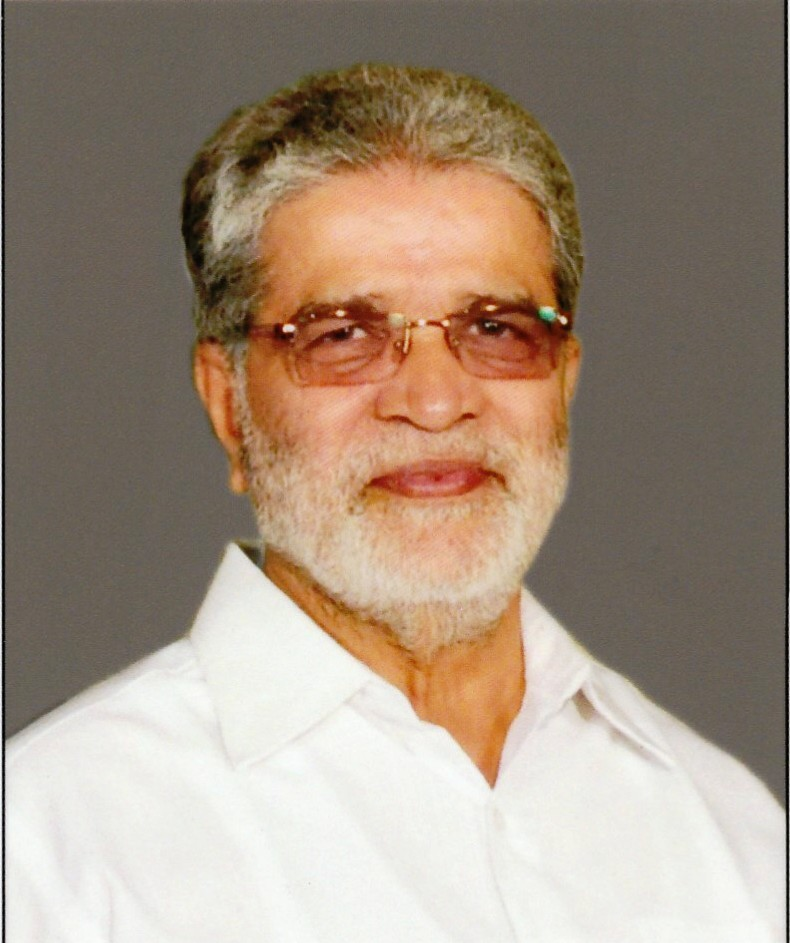

Chairman of Karnataka Legislative Council
- In office 12 December 2018 – 4 February 2021
- Preceded by: Basavaraj Horatti
- Succeeded by: Basavaraj Horatti

Member of the Karnataka Legislative Council
- In office 6 January 2004 – 5 January 2022
- Succeeded by: Manjunath Bhandari
- Constituency: Dakshina Kannada – Udupi Local Authorities constituency

Member of the Karnataka Legislative Assembly
- In office 1983–1999

Personal details
- Born: 4 September 1950 (age 75) Kolkebail, Udupi Taluk and District
- Party: Indian National Congress

Kolkebail Prathapachandra Hiriyanna Shetty (born 4 September 1950) is an Indian politician who was the chairman of Karnataka Legislative Council from 12 December 2018 to 4 February 2021.

He was a member of the Karnataka Legislative Assembly (MLA) from Kundapura Assembly Constituency representing Indian National Congress for 4 consecutive terms starting from 1983 To 1994 Later He represented Local bodies in the Karnataka Legislative Council from 2004 To 2021.

== Early life ==
He was born to a Huyyar Patel Sri Hiriyanna Shetty and Kolkebail Mrs Gulabi Shetty at Kolkebail, Udupi Taluk and District. Born in an influential farming family, he graduated from Mysore University in the year (1977–78) and took up farming.

== Political career ==
Starting his political career as a President of the Youth Congress Committee of Kundapura Block, he contested his first Assembly election in the year 1983 from Indian National Congress Party and defeated Sri Mani Gopal of Janatha Party to become MLA of the Kundapura Constituency.

In 1985 He successfully defended his MLA seat from Kundapur against Sri Appanna Hegde of Janatha Party. In 1989, He defended his MLA seat for the third consecutive term by defeating Sri K N Govardhan of Janatha Dal. In 1994, He defended his MLA seat from Kundapur for the fourth consecutive term by defeating Sri A G Kodgi of BJP.

He lost his MLA seat to his once close confidant Sri Halady Srinivasa Shetty of BJP in 1994.

Prathapachandra Shetty was elected as Member of Karnataka Legislative Council representing the Local bodies Constituency in 2004. He was re-elected to this position in the years 2010 and 2016. In 2010, He was elected to the Karnataka Legislative Council unanimously. He was the chairman of Karnataka Legislative Council from 12 December 2018 to 4 February 2021.

During his long political career, Prathapachandra Shetty has served as Member of the All India Congress Committee, Vice President of South Canara District Youth Congress Committee, Vice President of the Karnataka State Youth Congress Committee, President of the Udupi District Congress Committee and Vice President of the Karnataka Pradesh Congress Committee.

=== Social career ===
Prathapachandra Shetty is serving as President of the Huyyaru Patel Charitable Trust, which is socially active in Udupi district. He is also the President of Udupi District Raitha Sangha (R.).

Being a socially concerned person, he had organised Sathyagrahas for socially burning issues like Akrama – Sakrama Hakku Patra and completion of the Varahi Irrigation Project. He had participated in the Jail Bharo agitation organised to demand jobs for locals in MRPL. He had fought legal and legislative battles to provide clean drinking water to 14 villages through which drinking water supply pipeline to Udupi city being planned is passing through.

As member of the Petitions Committee of the Karnataka Legislative Council, he was actively involved in resolving many problems of the coastal districts.

His Major achievement as a Member of Legislative Assembly and Council was to provide basic infrastructures to Kundapur Assembly Constituency. Some major projects include: Government High schools in Kedur, Belur, Hosangadi, Halady, Haikady-Hiliyana, Amparu, Avarse, Kandlur, Amasebail, Beejady, Koni. Government Colleges in Shankaranarayana, Goliangadi, Thekkatte and Hosangadi. Major bridges include Dodda Belaru bridge in Hengavalli, Shadimane Bridge in Shedimane, Kaibailu Bridge in Hengavalli, Ballamane Bridge in Amasebail, Hattiangadi Bridge in Hattiangadi, Hanja-Edamalli Bridge in Madamakki, Belve-Nanchar Bridge in Nanchar. Government Public Health Centres in Kedur, Hosangadi, Avarse and Upgradation of Kundapur Taluk Hospital. Other Infrastructures like Fire Station in Kundapur, Treasury office in Shankaranarayana, Upgradation of Shankaranarayana Police Station.
