= B. L. Shankar =

Indian politician and advocate (born 1952)

B. L. Shankar (born 29 May 1952) is an Indian politician, advocate, and academic from the state of Karnataka. He is from the Chikkamagaluru region and served as a Member of Parliament (MP), a Member of the Legislative Council (MLC), and the Chairman of the Karnataka Legislative Council. He is currently a senior leader of the Indian National Congress.

== Early life and education ==
Shankar was born in Belagodu, Chikkamagaluru district. He completed his Bachelor of Science (B.Sc.) at J.S.S. College, Dharwad, and earned an LL.B. from University Law College, Bangalore University.

Later in his career, he pursued advanced academic studies, obtaining an M.A. (2001) and a Ph.D. in Political Science (2008) from Bangalore University

== Political career ==
Shankar began his political journey in the 1980s, initially rising through the ranks of the Janata Dal before joining the Congress party.

=== Legislative roles ===
- Member of the Legislative Council (MLC): He served as an MLC from 1985 to 1990 and again from 1998 to 2004. During his second term, he served as the Chairman of the Karnataka Legislative Council.
- Member of Parliament (MP): In 1996, he was elected to the 11th Lok Sabha representing the Chikkamagaluru constituency.
