= Mankala Vaidya =

Indian politician

Mankala Subba Vaidya
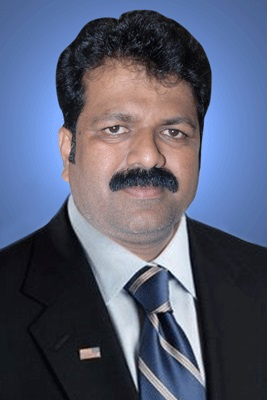

Deputy Speaker of the Karnataka Legislative Assembly
- Incumbent
- Assumed office 18 August 2026
- Speaker: Gurupadagouda Patil
- Preceded by: Rudrappa Lamani

Cabinet Minister, Government of Karnataka
- In office 27 May 2023 – 29 May 2026
- Governor: Thawarchand Gehlot
- Cabinet: Second Siddaramaiah ministry
- Chief Minister: Siddaramaiah
- Ministry and Departments: Fisheries & Ports; Inland Transport

Member of Karnataka Legislative Assembly
- Incumbent
- Assumed office 2023
- Preceded by: Sunil Biliya Naik
- Constituency: Bhatkal
- In office 2013–2018
- Preceded by: J. D. Naik
- Succeeded by: Sunil Biliya Naik
- Constituency: Bhatkal

Personal details
- Party: Indian National Congress

Mankal S. Vaidya is an Indian politician from Karnataka. He is currently serving as Cabinet Minister in Government of Karnataka and as a member of Karnataka Legislative Assembly representing Bhatkal.

He contested the 2013 Karnataka Legislative Assembly elections from Bhatkal–Honnavar assembly constituency as an Independent candidate and won polling 37,319 votes. He later joined the Indian National Congress in 2014.

On 25 February 2018, he survived an assassination attempt during a public function in Hosad village of Uttara Kannada district.

== Politicial Journey ==
Mankala Vaidya was first inducted into the Second Siddaramaiah ministry on 27 May 2023, holding the portfolios of Fisheries & Ports and Inland Transport, and served until the cabinet's dissolution on 3 June 2026 following Siddaramaiah's resignation as Chief Minister.

When D. K. Shivakumar took over as CM, Vaidya's name initially appeared in the AICC's list of ministers for the new cabinet, but he was dropped at the last minute and replaced by S. S. Mallikarjun, with the Congress high command later citing a "typographical error" as the reason for his inclusion.

To compensate for his exclusion, Vaidya was offered—and accepted—the post of Deputy Speaker of the Karnataka Legislative Assembly, to which he was unanimously elected on 18 August 2026, succeeding Rudrappa Lamani and replacing the earlier candidate A. S. Ponnanna.
