= Vimala Gowda =

Indian politician

Deputy Chairman Karnataka Legislative Council
- In office 17 January 2011 – 17 October 2014
- Preceded by: Puttanna
- Succeeded by: Puttanna

Member of the Karnataka Legislative Council
- In office 18 June 2006 – 18 April 2017
- Succeeded by: C. M. Ibrahim

Personal details
- Born: 20 November 1952 Bengaluru
- Died: 18 April 2017 (aged 64)
- Party: Bharatiya Janata Party

Vimala Venkatappa Gowda (1952 – 2017) was an Indian politician who was the Deputy Chairman of Karnataka Legislative Council from 17 January 2011 to 17 October 2014. She was one of the senior leaders of the Bharatiya Janata Party in Karnataka and served as a member of the Karnataka Legislative Council for 2 terms from 18 June 2006 until her death in 17 April 2017.

== Death ==
She died on 17 April 2017 after suffering a heart attack.
