= Haveri Assembly constituency =

Legislative Assembly constituency in Karnataka State, India

Coordinates: 14.8°N 75.4°E

Haveri
- Constituency No. 84 for the Karnataka Legislative Assembly

Constituency details
- Country: India
- Region: South India
- State: Karnataka
- Division: Belagavi
- District: Haveri
- Lok Sabha constituency: Haveri
- Established: 1951
- Total electors: 233,307
- Reservation: SC

Member of Legislative Assembly
- 16th Karnataka Legislative Assembly
- Incumbent Rudrappa Lamani
- Party: INC
- Alliance: I.N.D.I.A
- Elected year: 2023
- Preceded by: Neharu Olekar

Haveri Assembly constituency is one of the 224 Legislative Assembly constituencies of Karnataka in India.

It is part of Haveri district and is reserved for candidates belonging to the Scheduled Castes. Rudrappa Lamani is the current MLA of Haveri constituency.

== Members of the Legislative Assembly ==
Election	Member	Party
1952	Hallikeri Gudleppa Veerappa	Indian National Congress
1957	Mailar Shiddavva W/o Mahadevappa	Indian National Congress
1962	Magavi Basavaraj Veerappa	Indian National Congress
1967	Magavi Basavaraj Veerappa	Indian National Congress
1972	Taware Fakirappa Shiddappa	Indian National Congress
1978	Taware Fakirappa Shiddappa	Indian National Congress
1983	Kalakoti Chittaranjan Chanabaneppa	Janata Party
1985	Kalakoti Chittaranjan Chanabaneppa	Janata Party
1989	Shivapur. M. D	Indian National Congress
1994	Shivannanavar Basavaraj Neelappa	Janata Dal
1999	Shivannanavar Basavaraj Neelappa	Janata Dal
2004	Shivaraj Sajjanar	Bharatiya Janata Party
2008	Neharu Olekar	Bharatiya Janata Party
2013	Rudrappa Lamani	Indian National Congress
2018	Neharu Olekar	Bharatiya Janata Party
2023	Rudrappa Lamani	Indian National Congress

== Election results ==
=== Assembly Election 2023 ===
2023 Karnataka Legislative Assembly election : Haveri
Party	Candidate	Votes	%	±%
INC	Rudrappa Lamani	93,827	51.73	▲7.61
BJP	Gavisiddappa Dyamannavar	81,912	45.16	▼5.58
NOTA	None of the above	1,415	0.78	▼0.43
JD(S)	Tukaram H. Malagi	1,206	0.66	▼1.16
Margin of victory		11,915	6.57	▼0.06
Turnout		181,786	77.92	▲0.92
Total valid votes		181,383		
Registered electors		233,307		▲5.19
INC gain from BJP		Swing	▲0.99	

=== Assembly Election 2018 ===
2018 Karnataka Legislative Assembly election : Haveri
Party	Candidate	Votes	%	±%
BJP	Neharu Olekar	86,565	50.74	▲47.30
INC	Rudrappa Lamani	75,261	44.12	▼11.36
JD(S)	Sanjay Dange	3,099	1.82	▲0.84
NOTA	None of the above	2,062	1.21	New
Independent	Basavaraj Nagappa Nagammanavar	1,088	0.64	New
Margin of victory		11,304	6.63	▼13.53
Turnout		170,778	77.00	▲1.18
Total valid votes		170,591		
Registered electors		221,791		▲11.65
BJP gain from INC		Swing	▼4.74	

=== Assembly Election 2013 ===
2013 Karnataka Legislative Assembly election : Haveri
Party	Candidate	Votes	%	±%
INC	Rudrappa Lamani	83,119	55.48	▲42.36
KJP	Neharu Olekar	52,911	35.31	New
BJP	Dr. Malleshappa Harijan	5,153	3.44	▼32.73
Independent	Motilala. Doddamani	2,088	1.39	New
BSRCP	Kariyallappa Fakkirappa Bhajantri	2,070	1.38	New
JD(S)	Megalamani Parameshwara Tippanna	1,461	0.98	▼2.06
Independent	Sanjayagandhi Puttappa Sanjeevannanavar	1,207	0.81	New
JD(U)	Shankara Allipura	989	0.66	New
Margin of victory		30,208	20.16	▲4.25
Turnout		150,610	75.82	▲12.91
Total valid votes		149,831		
Registered electors		198,647		▲10.04
INC gain from BJP		Swing	▲19.31	

=== Assembly Election 2008 ===
2008 Karnataka Legislative Assembly election : Haveri
Party	Candidate	Votes	%	±%
BJP	Neharu Olekar	41,068	36.17	▼9.77
Independent	Lamani Rudrappa Manappa	23,002	20.26	New
Independent	Dr. S. S. Mathad	16,687	14.70	New
INC	Betageri Sharada Jagadish	14,902	13.12	▼30.93
Independent	Dr. Dange Sanjay	4,209	3.71	New
JD(S)	Kamala Laxman Naik	3,448	3.04	▼3.00
Independent	Shankrappa Basavanneppa Kunnur	1,821	1.60	New
SP	P. Gangadhar Venkatappa	1,260	1.11	New
BSP	Basavantappa Guddappa Gonemmanavar	1,193	1.05	New
Margin of victory		18,066	15.91	▲14.02
Turnout		113,570	62.91	▼8.35
Total valid votes		113,543		
Registered electors		180,520		▲10.45
BJP hold		Swing	▼9.77	

=== Assembly Election 2004 ===
2004 Karnataka Legislative Assembly election : Haveri
Party	Candidate	Votes	%	±%
BJP	Shivaraj Sajjanar	53,482	45.94	▲44.72
INC	Shivannanavar Basavaraj Neelappa	51,286	44.05	▲26.55
JD(S)	Bheemakkanavar Shivanand Hanumantappa	7,029	6.04	▼29.78
JP	Bankapur Ganeshappa Yellappa	2,816	2.42	New
Kannada Nadu Party	Gurumath Shivanandayya Shivayya	1,816	1.56	New
Margin of victory		2,196	1.89	▼0.84
Turnout		116,459	71.26	▼2.42
Total valid votes		116,429		
Registered electors		163,437		▲12.42
BJP gain from JD(S)		Swing	▲10.12	

=== Assembly Election 1999 ===
1999 Karnataka Legislative Assembly election : Haveri
Party	Candidate	Votes	%	±%
JD(S)	Shivannanavar Basavaraj Neelappa	35,399	35.82	New
Independent	Dr. Chittaranjan Kalkoti	32,704	33.09	New
INC	Meenakshi Girji. V	17,300	17.50	▼6.94
JD(U)	Ms Korishettar	9,004	9.11	New
Independent	Patil Naganagouda Basanagouda	1,962	1.99	New
Kannada Chalavali Vatal Paksha	Hadimani Basavaraj Ramappa	1,258	1.27	New
BJP	Baseganni Jagadeesh Shivakumar	1,204	1.22	▼8.80
Margin of victory		2,695	2.73	▼31.91
Turnout		107,114	73.68	▲1.87
Total valid votes		98,831		
Rejected ballots		8,216	7.67	▲5.12
Registered electors		145,375		▲7.70
JD(S) gain from JD		Swing	▼23.27	

=== Assembly Election 1994 ===
1994 Karnataka Legislative Assembly election : Haveri
Party	Candidate	Votes	%	±%
JD	Shivannanavar Basavaraj Neelappa	55,806	59.09	▲14.25
INC	Mahavi Rajashekhar Chanabasappa	23,086	24.44	▼27.03
BJP	Baseganni Jagadeesh Shivakumar	9,465	10.02	New
INC	Panchaxari Revappa Valasangad	4,887	5.17	New
Margin of victory		32,720	34.64	▲28.01
Turnout		96,926	71.81	▼1.04
Total valid votes		94,444		
Rejected ballots		2,469	2.55	▼1.96
Registered electors		134,976		▲6.62
JD gain from INC		Swing	▲7.62	

=== Assembly Election 1989 ===
1989 Karnataka Legislative Assembly election : Haveri
Party	Candidate	Votes	%	±%
INC	Shivapur. M. D	45,331	51.47	▲15.63
JD	Shivannanavar Basavaraj Neelappa	39,488	44.84	New
Kranti Sabha	Neeralagi. K. C	1,427	1.62	New
JP	Ujanikoppa. S. B	1,056	1.20	New
Margin of victory		5,843	6.63	▼7.27
Turnout		92,225	72.85	▼0.06
Total valid votes		88,070		
Rejected ballots		4,155	4.51	▲2.50
Registered electors		126,595		▲26.50
INC gain from JP		Swing	▲1.73	

=== Assembly Election 1985 ===
1985 Karnataka Legislative Assembly election : Haveri
Party	Candidate	Votes	%	±%
JP	Kalakoti Chittaranjan Chanabaneppa	35,564	49.74	▼3.89
INC	Minaxi Girji	25,628	35.84	▼7.32
Independent	Magavi. P. C	9,252	12.94	New
Independent	Chapparao. R. M	1,055	1.48	New
Margin of victory		9,936	13.90	▲3.43
Turnout		72,966	72.91	▲4.08
Total valid votes		71,499		
Rejected ballots		1,467	2.01	▼0.96
Registered electors		100,077		▲7.60
JP hold		Swing	▼3.89	

=== Assembly Election 1983 ===
1983 Karnataka Legislative Assembly election : Haveri
Party	Candidate	Votes	%	±%
JP	Kalakoti Chittaranjan Chanabaneppa	33,316	53.63	▲24.01
INC	Girji Rajashekhar Basavaneppa	26,813	43.16	▲31.76
Independent	Valasangada Panchakshari Revappa	931	1.50	New
Independent	Jabean Somashekharappa Gurushantappa	684	1.10	New
Independent	Sroupkkanavar Satyabodah Rajacharya	374	0.60	New
Margin of victory		6,503	10.47	▼18.90
Turnout		64,019	68.83	▼1.47
Total valid votes		62,118		
Rejected ballots		1,901	2.97	▼0.12
Registered electors		93,009		▲9.71
JP gain from INC(I)		Swing	▼5.36	

=== Assembly Election 1978 ===
1978 Karnataka Legislative Assembly election : Haveri
Party	Candidate	Votes	%	±%
INC(I)	Taware Fakirappa Shiddappa	34,067	58.99	New
JP	Wadeyar Shivaputra Lingayya	17,105	29.62	New
INC	Baseganni Shivkumar Basappa	6,583	11.40	▼45.76
Margin of victory		16,962	29.37	▲7.90
Turnout		59,598	70.30	▲3.63
Total valid votes		57,755		
Rejected ballots		1,843	3.09	▲3.09
Registered electors		84,777		▲23.90
INC(I) gain from INC		Swing	▲1.83	

=== Assembly Election 1972 ===
1972 Mysore State Legislative Assembly election : Haveri
Party	Candidate	Votes	%	±%
INC	Taware Fakirappa Shiddappa	25,061	57.16	▼2.21
INC(O)	S. M. Danappa	15,650	35.70	New
CPI(M)	Valasangada Panchakshari Revappa	3,132	7.14	▼27.35
Margin of victory		9,411	21.47	▼3.41
Turnout		45,619	66.67	▲7.69
Total valid votes		43,843		
Registered electors		68,422		▲7.55
INC hold		Swing	▼2.21	

=== Assembly Election 1967 ===
1967 Mysore State Legislative Assembly election : Haveri
Party	Candidate	Votes	%	±%
INC	Magavi Basavaraj Veerappa	20,494	59.37	▲1.59
CPI(M)	Valasangada Panchakshari Revappa	11,905	34.49	New
Independent	M. R. Fakirappa	1,471	4.26	New
Independent	K. M. Fakirappa	376	1.09	New
Independent	K. R. Sannappa	271	0.79	New
Margin of victory		8,589	24.88	▼3.04
Turnout		37,523	58.98	▼9.53
Total valid votes		34,517		
Registered electors		63,616		▲23.60
INC hold		Swing	▲1.59	

=== Assembly Election 1962 ===
1962 Mysore State Legislative Assembly election : Haveri
Party	Candidate	Votes	%	±%
INC	Magavi Basavaraj Veerappa	18,945	57.78	▼28.79
SWA	Shivaraj Rachappa Nelavigi	9,790	29.86	New
CPI	Panchaksharapa Revappa Valasang	4,054	12.36	New
Margin of victory		9,155	27.92	▼48.30
Turnout		35,262	68.51	▲21.19
Total valid votes		32,789		
Registered electors		51,471		▲21.98
INC hold		Swing	▼28.79	

=== Assembly Election 1957 ===
1957 Mysore State Legislative Assembly election : Haveri
Party	Candidate	Votes	%	±%
INC	Mailar Shiddavva W/o Mahadevappa	17,286	86.57	▲36.19
Independent	Walasangad Panchaxarappa Revappa	2,067	10.35	New
Independent	Godi Basavaneppa Rudrappa	614	3.08	New
Margin of victory		15,219	76.22	▲75.46
Turnout		19,967	47.32	▼22.05
Total valid votes		19,967		
Registered electors		42,195		▼25.82
INC hold		Swing	▲36.19	

=== Assembly Election 1952 ===
1952 Bombay State Legislative Assembly election : Haveri
Party	Candidate	Votes	%	±%
INC	Hallikeri Gudleppa Veerappa	19,879	50.38	New
Independent	Gurushantappa Gurubasappa Magavi	19,578	49.62	New
Margin of victory		301	0.76	
Turnout		39,457	69.37	
Total valid votes		39,457		
Registered electors		56,880		
INC win (new seat)				

== See also ==
- List of constituencies of the Karnataka Legislative Assembly
- Haveri district
