= Suvarna Vidhana Soudha =

- Suvarṇa Vidhāna Saudha
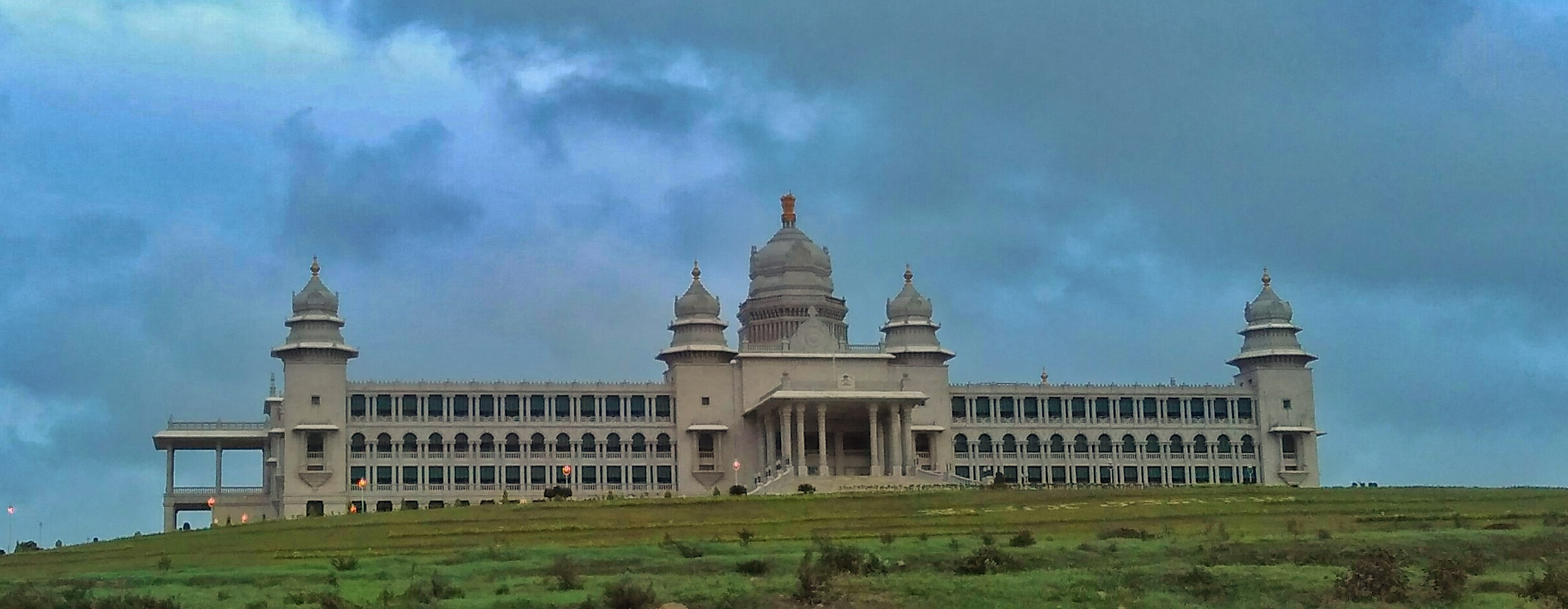
- Suvarna Vidhana Soudha is the seat of Karnataka's Legislative assembly in Belagavi

- Location within India

General information
- Status: Legislative building
- Architectural style: Neo-Dravidian
- Location: Belagavi, Karnataka, National Highway Road, Bastwad, Belagavi, Karnataka, India, Belagavi, India
- Coordinates: 15.8134°N 74.5714°E
- Construction started: 2007
- Completed: 2012
- Inaugurated: 11 October 2012 (13 years ago)
- Cost: ₹4 billion (US$42 million)
- Owner: Karnataka Government

Height
- Height: 46 metres (151 ft)

Technical details
- Floor count: 4 + 1 basement
- Floor area: 145,730 square metres (1,568,600 sq ft)

Design and construction
- Main contractor: B.G. Shirke Construction Technology Pvt. Ltd.

Other information
- Seating capacity: 300 Members
- Public transit: City Bus Stand, Belagavi

The Suvarna Vidhana Soudha (lit. 'Golden Legislative House') is the legislature building of the State of Karnataka in Belagavi in the Belagavi district of Karnataka. It was inaugurated on 11 October 2012 by President Pranab Mukherjee.

== The building ==
The Suvarna Vidhana Soudha has been so named to commemorate the Golden Jubilee of Karnataka's formation day. The building is a four floored structure with a total built-up area of 60,398 sq.m. and consists of an Assembly hall that seats 300, a Council hall for 100 members, a 450-seat Central Hall, 38 ministerial chambers and 14 meeting halls. It also has conference halls, a banquet hall, secretariats for both the houses of legislature, meeting halls and office accommodations. The entire complex is located on 51 hectares of land that was acquired from farmers in the area. The Ashoka Chakra atop the main dome of the building, is measuring 3.68 metres by 2.11 metres and weighing 6.50 tonnes. The facade of the building has the motto 'Work is Worship' (kayakave kailasa) given by 12th century poet and social reformer Basavanna inscribed on it.

== History of construction ==
The Suvarna Vidhana Soudha was constructed as a part of Karnataka's reiteration of its control over Belagavi in its inter state rivalry with Maharashtra for control of the district. While the proposal to build a legislature building in Belagavi to counter Maharashtra's claim to the area had been mooted several years ago, it was after HD Kumaraswamy became Chief Minister that the project gained momentum. While it was originally to have come up at Tilakwadi, it was subsequently relocated to its present location at the Halga-Bastwad area of Belagavi, 10 km from the city and just off the Bangalore-Mumbai highway, which is a part of the Golden Quadrilateral project. The bhoomi puja for the original building was performed by the then Chief Minister, Kumaraswamy in 2007 while his successor, Yeddyurappa performed it for the construction of the building at its new venue in 2009.

Work began on the building in August 2009 and it was to have been completed in 18 months within an original budget of ₹ 2.30 billion. The Pune based B.G. Shirke Construction Technology Pvt. Ltd. were given the contract to construct the building. There were repeated extensions of the deadline on account of tardy progress in construction. The contract for interior design and services consultancy was awarded to Gajbar & Associates headed by Ar. Vijay Gajbar from Belagavi and Kolhapur. They were entrusted with the interior design of all the halls and audiotorioums inside the building. They also provided design consultancy for outer landscape and MEP design. By August 2012, the cost of the building alone had reached ₹ 391 crore with estimates suggesting a final bill of nearly ₹ 5 billion (roughly US$100 million) on its completion. The inauguration ceremony itself has been billed at ₹ 150 million.

== Criticism ==
The building of the Suvarna Soudha has been criticised as an extravagance as the building will only be used once a year to hold a session of the Karnataka Legislative Assembly. The Karnataka Government however has suggested that the building will also host legislative committee and regional meetings of the State government and conferences and meetings with foreign delegations when the legislative session is not being held there.
