= H. K. Patil =

Indian politician

Hanumanthagouda Krishnegouda Patil
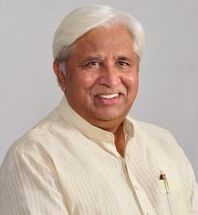

Member of Karnataka Legislative Assembly
- Incumbent
- Assumed office 5 May 2013
- Chief Minister(s): D. K. Shivakumar; Siddaramaiah; N. Dharam Singh; S. M. Krishna; Veerappa Moily
- Constituency: Gadag

Incharge of AICC for Maharashtra
- In office 11 September 2020 – 24 December 2023
- President: Sonia Gandhi and Mallikarjun Kharge
- Preceded by: Mallikarjun Kharge
- Succeeded by: Ramesh Chennithala

Minister for Rural Development and Panchayat Raj, Government of Karnataka
- In office 18 May 2013 – 17 May 2018
- Preceded by: Jagadish Shettar
- Succeeded by: Krishna Byre Gowda

Minister for Law and Parliamentary Affairs, Government of Karnataka
- In office 19 December 2004 – 1 February 2006
- Preceded by: M. P. Prakash
- Succeeded by: Basavaraj Horatti

Minister for Agriculture, Government of Karnataka
- In office 12 December 2003 – 28 May 2004

Minister for Water Resources, Government of Karnataka
- In office 17 October 1999 – 12 December 2003

Leader of Opposition Karnataka Legislative Council
- In office 28 December 1994 – 16 October 1999

Minister of state for Textiles, Government of Karnataka
- In office 20 January 1992 – 11 December 1994

Cabinet Minister, Government of Karnataka
- In office 20 May 2023 – 29 May 2026
- Governor: Thawar Chand Gehlot
- Cabinet: Second Siddaramaiah ministry
- Chief Minister: Siddaramaiah
- Ministry and Departments: Law, Parliamentary Affairs, Legislation, Tourism.

Member of Karnataka Legislative Council
- In office (1984-1990), (1990-1996), (1996-2002), (2002 – 2008)
- Constituency: West Graduates' Constituency

Personal details
- Born: 15 August 1953 (age 73) Hulkoti, Karnataka State, India
- Party: Indian National Congress
- Spouse: Hema H Patil
- Children: 1 Son, 2 Daughters
- Parent: K. H. Patil (father)
- Education: Bachelor of Science, Bachelor of Law
- Profession: Journalist

Hanumanthagowda Krishnegowda Patil (born 15 August 1953) is an Indian politician from Gadag in Karnataka, India. He is the current Minister for Law and Parliamentary Affairs, Government of Karnataka. He was the Rural Development and Panchayat Raj Minister in the Government of Karnataka headed by Siddaramaiah. He currently represents the Gadag Assembly Constituency in Karnataka Legislative Assembly.

== Personal life ==
He is the son of Late Sri. K. H. Patil, a renowned politician and former Minister for Co-operation, Government of Karnataka.

== Positions held ==
- 1984–2008: Represented the West Graduates' Constituency in the Karnataka Legislative Council for four consecutive terms.
- 1992–1994: Minister of State for Textiles.
- 1994–1999: Leader of Opposition in the Karnataka Legislative Council.
- 1999–2003: Minister for Water Resources in the Karnataka government.
- 2003–2004: Agriculture Minister.
- 2004–2006: Law & Parliamentary Affairs Minister.
- 2008: Lost the West Graduates' Legislative Council seat to BJP's Mohan Limbikai.
- 2008: Contested Gadag Assembly but lost to BJP's B. S. Veerupakshappa.
- 2013: Finally won Gadag Assembly constituency and became an MLA.
- 2018: Won second time as an MLA from Gadag Assembly constituency.
- 2023: Again Won for third time from Gadag Assembly constituency.

== Political career ==
Patil got widespread accolades for enthusiastically involving himself with the expansion of Irrigation across the state and spearheading the attempt for Cloud Seeding while being the Minister for Water Resources of Karnataka. A veteran Congressman, he was also the Minister for textiles major irrigation, agriculture and Law and Parliamentary Affairs, Government of Karnataka and Leader of Opposition and Member of Karnataka Legislative Council. During his term as Minister for Rural Development and Panchayat Raj, Government of Karnataka, Karnataka bagged the E-Award instituted by the centre for effective use of Information and Communication Technology (ICT) in the Panchayat Raj department for the year 2015–16. Prime Minister Narendra Modi presented the award on 24 April 2017 in Lucknow during an event to mark National Panchayat Raj Day. His Rural Development and Panchayat Raj, Government of Karnataka department won National awards successively for record 4 years from 2014–15 to 2017–18.

Recently he stated to Assembly that about 74,558 cases were pending against Karnataka government as on date and overall in Karnataka as many as 21.68 lakh cases are pending in the courts - 2.71 lakh in the High Court and 18.96 lakh in district courts.
