= T. V. Venkataswamy =

Indian politician

T. V. Venkataswamy is the former member of Karnataka Legislative Council and the founder of Madhugiri Education Society.
