= Karnataka Public Service Commission =

State government agency

- Karnāṭaka LōkaSēvā Āyōga

Constitutional body overview
- Formed: 18 May 1951 (75 years ago)
- Jurisdiction: Karnataka
- Headquarters: Udyog Souda, Ambedkar Veedhi, Bengaluru, Karnataka
- Minister responsible: M. C. Sudhakar, Minister of Higher Education Department
- Constitutional body executives: Dr. B.Prabhudev, Interim Chairman; Dr. Rakesh Kumar K, IAS, Secretary; Nalini Atul, Examination Controller
- Website: kpsc.kar.nic.in

The Karnataka Public Service Commission is a government body in the state of Karnataka, India, responsible for recruiting candidates for various state government jobs through competitive examinations.

== History ==
Karnataka state initially operated without a public recruitment agency. But on 16 May 1921, the government laid the foundation of the Central Recruitment Board. It was headed by a commissioner secretary on 19 January 1940 when the country was under British rule. After 4 years of the independence, the Public Service Commission was constituted on 18 May 1951 under the provisions of the Constitution of India and Public Service Commission Regulations 1950. H.B. Gundappa Gowda, was appointed as the first Chairman and Sri George Matthan, and Sri H.M. Mallikarjunappa, as Members of the Commission in May 1951. Starting with Sri H.B. Gundappa Gowda, 13 Chairmen and 67 Members have been appointed to the Commission by Government.

== Duties and functions ==
The commission perform its duties and functions in accordance with the Article-320 and Government of India act 1935. In case, the commission lack recruitment transparency or perform its duties arbitrarily, it is responsible to follow the judicial proceedings in order to determine and enforce legal rights.

1. To conduct examinations including civil and departmental for appointments in the state.
2. To advise the state government on all matters relating to the methods of recruitment.
3. To make appointments to government bodies and promotions.
4. To advise the state government in transferring the officers from one service to another.
5. To grant pensions and awards in respect of injuries sustained by a person while serving under the Government in a civil capacity.
6. To consult the Union Public Service Commission in framing the rules and recruitment procedures.

== Commission profile ==
The KPS Commission is headed by a Chairman, Secretary and other members for their specific roles.

Name	Designation
Dr. B.Prabhudev	Interim Chairman
Randeep choudhary, IAS	Secretary
Nalini Atul, IAS	Examination Controller
R Girish	Member
Dr. H. Ravikumar	Member
Sri.Vijaya Kumar D Kuchanure	Member
Dr. H. S. Narendra	Member
H. G. Pavithra	Member
B.V.Geetha	Member

== See also ==
- Public service commissions in India
