= Rudrappa Lamani =

Deputy Speaker of Karnataka Legislative Assembly

20th Deputy Speaker of the Karanataka Legislative Assembly
- In office 6 July 2023 – 3 August 2026
- Chief Minister: Siddaramaiah; D. K. Shivakumar
- Speaker: U. T. Khader
- Preceded by: Anand Mamani
- Succeeded by: Mankal Vaidya

Member of the Karnataka Legislative Assembly
- Incumbent
- Assumed office 2023
- Preceded by: Neharu Olekar
- Constituency: Haveri
- In office 2013–2018
- Preceded by: Neharu Olekar
- Succeeded by: Neharu Olekar
- Constituency: Haveri
- In office 1999–2004
- Preceded by: Beelagi Sabanna
- Succeeded by: Neharu Olekar
- Constituency: Byadgi

Personal details
- Born: Rudrappa Manappa Lamani; 1 June 1959 (age 67) Khanderayanahalli, Ranebennur taluk, Dharwad, Mysore State, India
- Party: Indian National Congress
- Education: BA; LLB
- Occupation: Politician

Rudrappa Manappa Lamani (born 1 June 1959) is an Indian politician from Karnataka, who is currently serving as the 19th Deputy Speaker of the Karnataka Legislative Assembly, since July 2023. He was elected as a member of the Karnataka Legislative Assembly from the Haveri Assembly constituency which is reserved for SC community in Haveri district. He won the 2023 Karnataka Legislative Assembly election representing the Indian National Congress.

== Early life and education ==
Lamani is from Khanderayanahalli, Haveri district. His father Manappa is a farmer. He completed his graduation in 1982 from a college affiliated with Karnatak University and later did his LLB. His wife is a teacher. He belongs to Banjara community.

== Career ==
Lamani was elected in the Haveri Assembly constituency representing the Indian National Congress in the 2023 Karnataka Legislative Assembly election. He polled 93,827 votes and defeated his nearest rival, Gavisiddappa Dyamannavar of the Bharatiya Janata Party, by a margin of 11,915 votes. Earlier, he won the 2013 Karnataka Legislative Assembly election from the same seat. Representing Congress, he lost the 2018 Karnataka Legislative Assembly election to Neharu Olekar of Bharatiya Janata Party by a margin of 11,304 votes.

Lamani was elected unopposed as the Deputy Speaker of the Karnataka Legislative Assembly in July 2023. He became the 25th deputy speaker of the house. He was offered the post after Chamarajanagar MLA C. Puttarangashetty declined to take it up. Earlier, he served as a minister in the Congress government.
