= Saleem Ahmed =

Indian politician (born 1967)

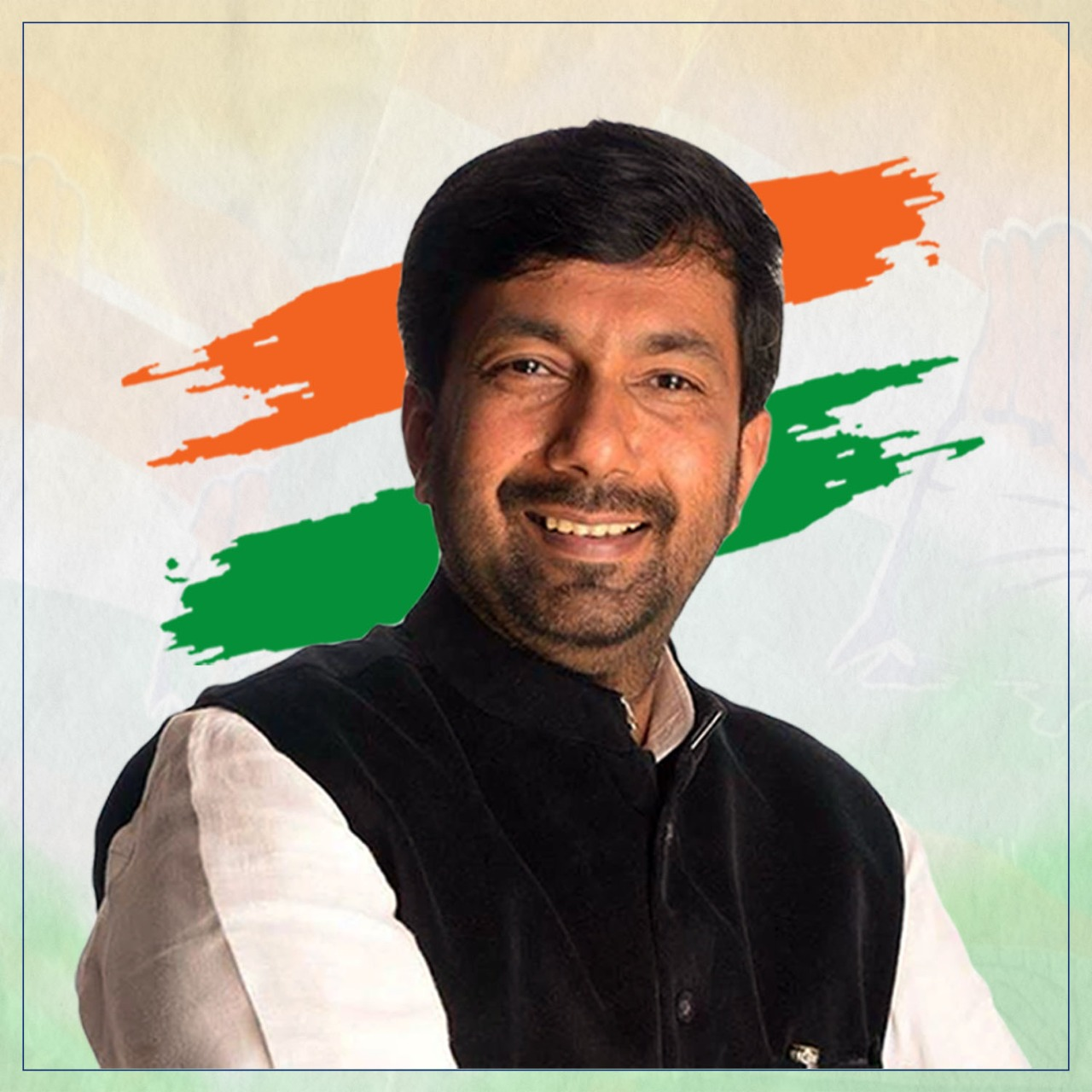

19th Chairperson of the Karnataka Legislative Council
- Incumbent
- Assumed office 14 August 2026
- Governor: Thawar Chand Gehlot
- Chief Minister: D. K. Shivakumar
- Preceded by: Puttanna (Acting)

Member of Karnataka Legislative Council
- Incumbent
- Assumed office 6 January 2022
- Preceded by: Srinivas Mane
- Constituency: Hubli–Dharwad, Haveri, Gadag district Local Authorities

Working President Karnataka Pradhesh Congress Committee
- In office 11 March 2020 – 14 August 2026

AICC Secretary, Telangana state
- In office 21 June 2018 – 11 March 2020

Special representative of the Government of Karnataka to the Union Government
- In office 25 January 2017 – 21 June 2018

Director General, Nehru Yuva Kendra Sangathan, Ministry of Youth Affairs and Sports, Government of India.
- In office 2012–2014

11th Govt Chief Whip Karnataka legislative council
- In office 2000–2007

Member of Legislative council, Karnataka
- In office 1996–2002 – 2002–2008

General Secretary, Indian Youth Congress
- In office 1997–1998

President, All India NSUI
- In office 1993–1997

President, Karnataka State NSUI
- In office 1987–1993

Vice President, Karnataka State NSUI
- In office 1983–1987

Elected student Union Leader, Seshadripuram College, Bangalore.
- In office 1982–1986

Personal details
- Born: 1 January 1967 (age 59)
- Party: Indian National Congress
- Parent: Azeez Ahmed (father)
- Profession: Politician

Saleem Ahmed (born 1 January 1967) is an Indian politician from Karnataka. He is currently serving as the Chairperson of the Karnataka Legislative Council from August 2026. He serves as Member of Karnataka Legislative Council from January 2022. He represents the Indian National Congress.

== Early life and background ==
Saleem Ahmed was born on 1 January 1967. Azeez Ahmed was his father. He completed his education B.A., grew up in Bangalore and spent his youth in various parts of Karnataka. His grandfather and uncle were a part of freedom movement against the British pre-independence.

Saleem Ahmed is an alumnus of Sheshadripuram College, Bangalore.

== Political career ==
=== Early career ===
Saleem Ahmed started his political career as a party worker and organized Rallies, Training camps and youth conventions. In 1982 he got elected as Student Union Leader of Sheshadripuram College, Bangalore. In 1984 he became Bangalore City NSUI Vice President, later in 1987 he became the President of Karnataka NSUI and General Secretary of All India Youth Congress.

=== Rise in Karnataka's politics ===
He was elected as Member of Karnataka Legislative Council for the first time in 1997 and served as member of various committees formed by the KLC. Later in 2000 he was appointed Government Chief whip in Karnataka Legislative Council. Again in 2002 he got elected as Member of Karnataka Legislative Council for second time.

In 2002 he became the Member of All India Congress Committee.

He served as Director General of Nehru Yuva Kendra Sangathan, Ministry of Youth Affairs and Sports, Government of India 2012–2014.

He was leader of the Indian delegation to South Korea for the Youth Exchange Program in 2012.

== Foreign delegations ==
- Saleem Ahmed was the leader of the Indian delegation to South Korea for the Youth Exchange Program in the year 2012.

== Personal life ==
Saleem Ahmed is married and has 2 children.

== Positions held ==
#	From	To	Position
1.	1982	1985	Elected as Student Union Leader of Sheshadripuram College, Bangalore.
2.	1983	1884	President College, NSUI Unit & Block President
3.	1984	1987	Bangalore City NSUI Vice President, Karnataka State NSUI
4.	1987	1993	President - Karnataka NSUI; General Secretary - All India Youth Congress
5.	1997	1998	Elected as Member of Karnataka Legislative Council
6.	1996	2002	Member, Karnataka Legislative Council Served as a Member of Various Committee formed by the KLC
7.	2000		Appointed Government Chief whip in Karnataka Legislative Council
8.	2002	2008	Member of the Legislative Council; Member of All India Congress Committee
9.	2012		Leader of the Indian delegation to South Korea for the Youth Exchange Program.
