= M. K. Pranesh =

Indian politician

- Leader of house: NS Boseraju

Deputy Chairperson of the Karnataka Legislative Council
- In office 29 January 2021 – 15 July 2026
- Chairperson: Basavaraj Horatti
- Preceded by: S. L. Dharmegowda
- Succeeded by: Umashree

Member of Karnataka Legislative Council
- In office 6 January 2016 – 15 July 2026
- Preceded by: V. Gayathri Shantegowda
- Succeeded by: V. Gayathri Shantegowda
- Constituency: Chikmagalur Local Authorities

Personal details
- Born: 1963 (age 62–63) Mudigere, Mysore State, India
- Party: Bharatiya Janata Party
- Education: B. A.
- Alma mater: University of Mysore

M. K. Pranesh is an Indian politician and former Deputy Chairperson of the Karnataka Legislative Council. He is a member of the Karnataka legislative Council from the Chikmagaluru local authorities constituency. He is fluent in Kannada, Tulu and English. He belongs to the Bharatiya Janata Party.

He is member of the Rashtriya Swayamsevak Sangh and has been a member of the BJP since 1989. He stepped into politics "when L.K. Advani began the rath yatra for Ram Mandir, Ayodhya". Pranesh defeated K. C. Kondaiah by securing 41 votes against 24 votes for the Deputy Chair election in 2021.
