= Chalavadi Narayanaswamy =

Indian politician

Chalavadi T. Narayanaswamy

Leader of the Opposition in the Karnataka Legislative Council
- Incumbent
- Assumed office 24 July 2024
- Preceded by: Kota Srinivas Poojary

Member of the Karnataka Legislative Council
- Incumbent
- Assumed office June 2022
- Constituency: Elected by members of the Karnataka Legislative Assembly

Personal details
- Born: 20 July
- Party: Bharatiya Janata Party (2018–present), Indian National Congress (until 2018)

Chalavadi T. Narayanaswamy is an Indian politician from Karnataka, belonging to the Bharatiya Janata Party. He has served as the Leader of the Opposition in the Karnataka Legislative Council since 24 July 2024. Formerly associated with the Indian National Congress, he joined the BJP in 2018 and was elected to the Legislative Council in May 2022.

== Early life and education ==
Narayanaswamy belongs to a Scheduled Caste community in Karnataka. He completed his pre-university education at V. V. Puram College, Bengaluru, during 1982-83.

== Political career ==
Narayanaswamy was associated with the Congress for several decades and served as general secretary of the Karnataka Pradesh Congress Committee (KPCC). In April 2018, he joined the BJP after being denied a Congress ticket from the Devanahalli Assembly constituency.

He subsequently served as the president of the Karnataka BJP Scheduled Castes Morcha. In May 2022, he was elected unopposed to the Karnataka Legislative Council.

On 22 July 2024, the BJP selected him as Leader of the Opposition in the Legislative Council, following Kota Srinivas Poojary's election to the Lok Sabha. He formally assumed the position two days later. As opposition leader, he raised issues concerning welfare expenditure, reservation policies and the utilisation of SCSP/TSP funds.

== Political controversies ==
=== RSS shorts protest (2022) ===
In June 2022, Narayanaswamy attracted criticism after carrying a collection of used khaki shorts (chaddis) associated with the Rashtriya Swayamsevak Sangh (RSS) on his head during a BJP protest targeting Congress leader Siddaramaiah. The campaign followed Congress protests against the alleged saffronisation of school textbooks. Siddaramaiah questioned why a Dalit leader was made to carry used shorts, prompting Narayanaswamy to file a complaint against him under Scheduled Caste and Scheduled Tribe (Prevention of Atrocities) Act, 1989

=== Remarks against Priyank Kharge ===
In May 2025, Narayanaswamy sparked controversy after comparing Prime Minister Narendra Modi to an elephant and Karnataka minister Priyank Kharge to a barking dog. His remarks led to protests by Congress workers in Chittapur. Narayanaswamy subsequently expressed regret, while Congress MLCs sought action against him from the Legislative Council Chairman.

=== Remarks about cutting Congress leaders into pieces (2026) ===
In November 2026, Narayanaswamy faced criticism after warning during a BJP rally in Kolar that Congress leaders would be torn into pieces and thrown into the Arabian Sea if they created unrest. He later clarified that his remarks targeted the Congress party rathen than individuals. In protest, National Students' Union of India (NSUI) members arranged deliveries of knives and cutters to his residence, following which BJP leaders filed a police complaint.
