= Emblem of Karnataka =

Indian state government emblem

- Armiger: The Government of Karnataka
- Crest: The Sarnath Lion Capital
- Shield: Gandabherunda
- Supporters: Two Yali (mythology) Gandabherunda
- Motto: "सत्यमेव जयते" (Satyameva Jayate, Sanskrit for "Truth Alone Triumphs")
- Earlier version: Kingdom of Mysuru
- Use: On state government documents, buildings and stationery

The Emblem of Karnataka is the official state emblem of the State of Karnataka, India. It is based on that of the Kingdom of Mysore, and is carried on all official correspondences made by the Government of Karnataka.

== Design ==
The state emblem has a red shield charged with a white two-headed bird, Gandabherunda bordered in blue. The crest depicts the Lion Capital of Ashoka (also used as the emblem of the Government of India), on a blue circular abacus with a blue frieze carrying sculptures in high relief of a galloping horse on the left, a Dharmachakra in centre, a bull on the right, and the outlines of Dharmachakras on the extreme left and right as part of Sarnath's Ashoka Pillar. The shield is flanked on either side by red-maned, yellow lion-elephant indicating the auspicious mythological character Gajakesari, a hybrid form of two wise and powerful animals Lion and Elephant - a mythical creature believed to be auspicious and indicate strength, authority, and intelligence. The power of Gajakesari is believed to be upholders of stronger righteousness and spells much abundance and bliss. It also refers to the fortunate momentum or energy in Hindu astrology. A person having 'Gajakesari Yoga' in his astrology chart is believed to be conquering the world as per Hindu belief, same referring to a kingdom which justifies all characteristics of a conqueror standing on a green, leafy compartment. Below the compartment lies written in stylized Devanāgarī, the national motto of India, "सत्यमेव जयते" (Satyameva Jayate, Sanskrit for "Truth alone triumphs").

== Historical emblems ==
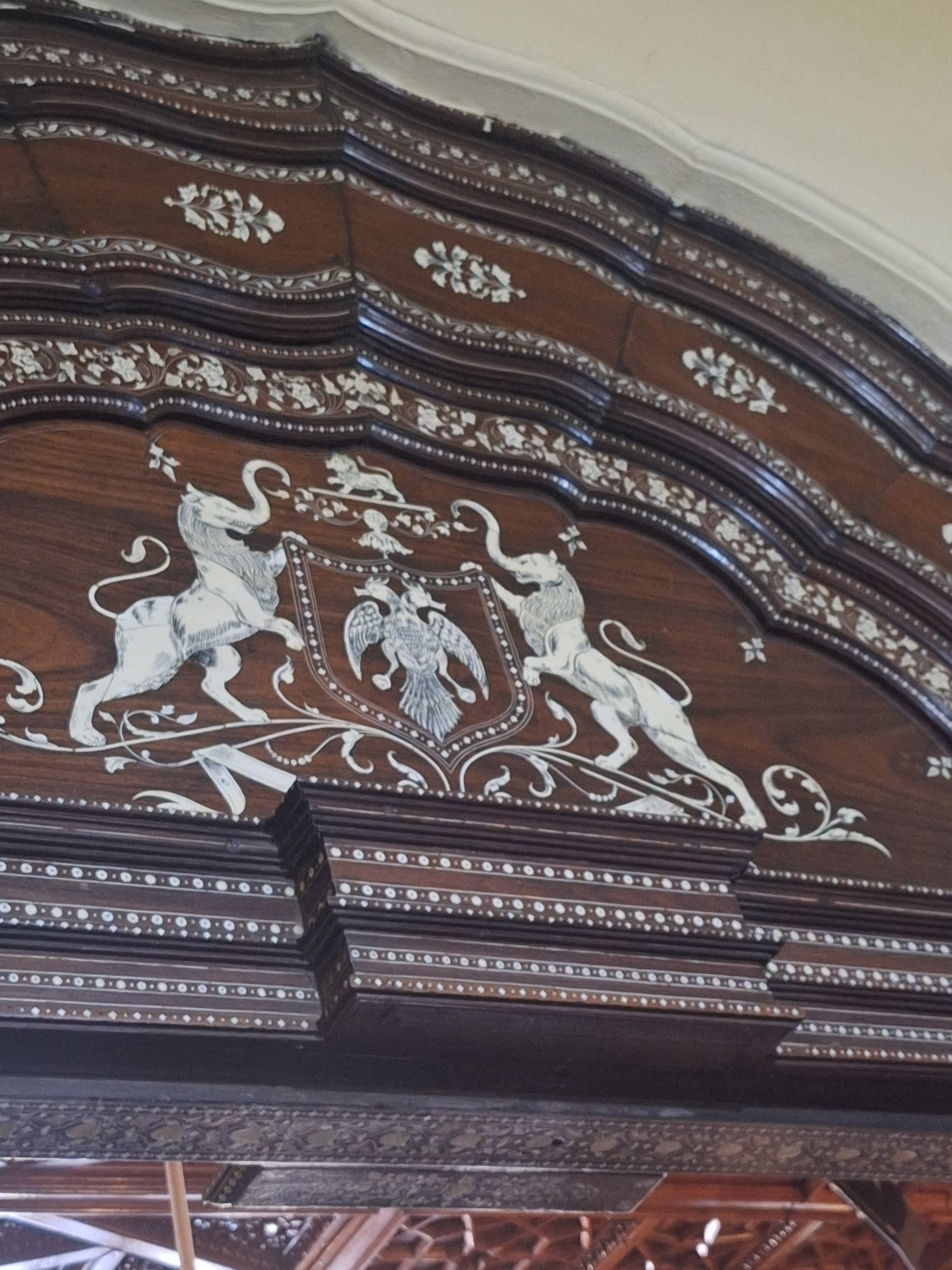
Gandabherunda Emblem in Mysore Palace inspired from Mysore Kingdom

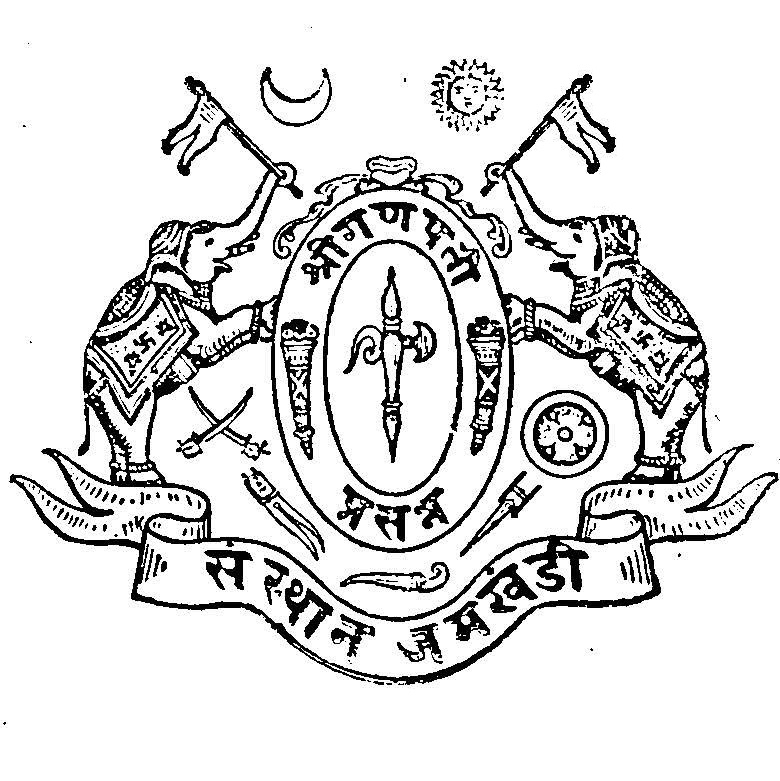
Coat of arms of the Jamkhandi State

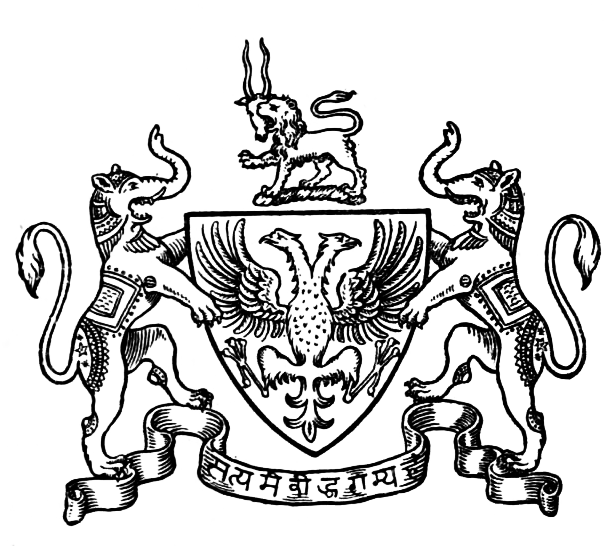
Coat of arms of the Kingdom of Mysore

== Government banner ==
The Government of Karnataka can be represented by a banner that depicts the emblem of the state on a white background. A flag was proposed in 2018 but was not formally adopted. The unofficial Kannada flag is also in use.

Banner of Karnataka

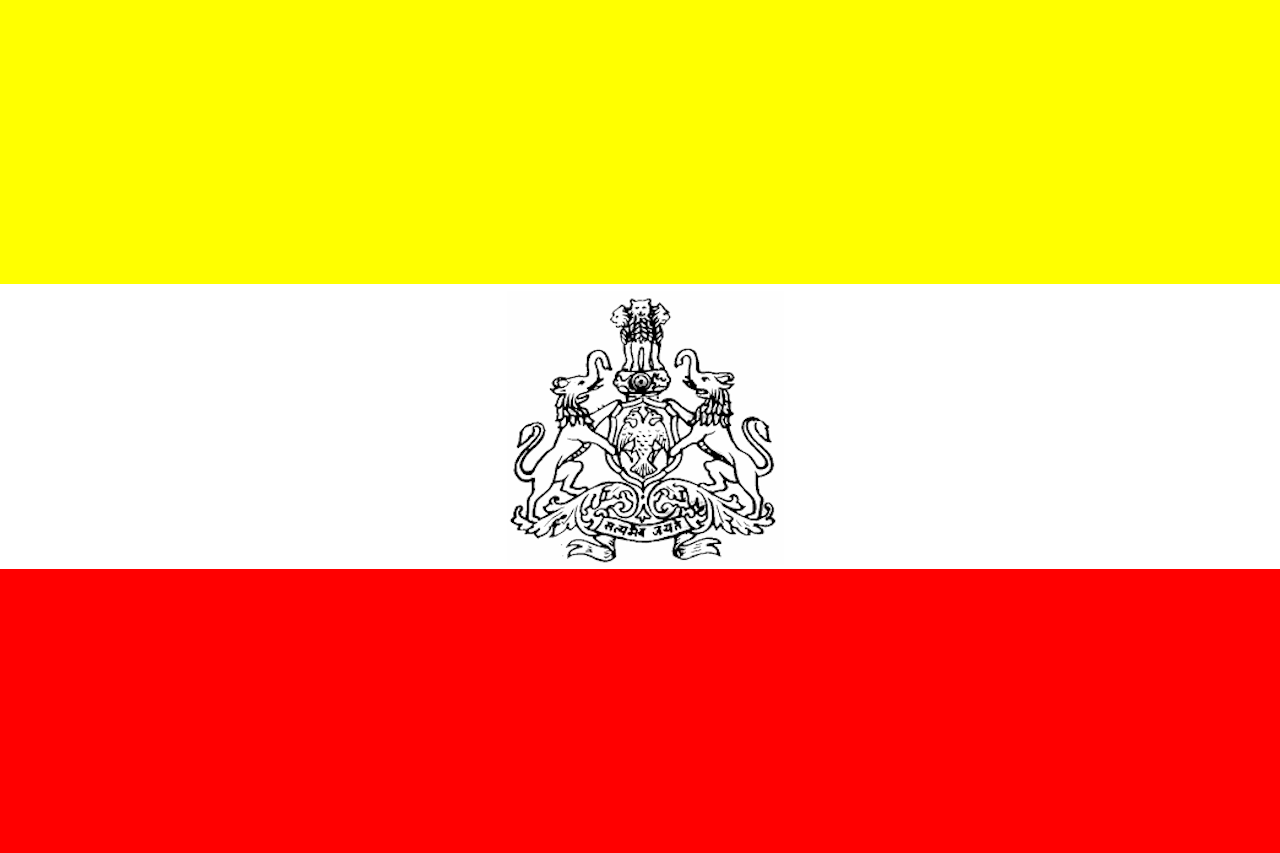
Former flag proposal

Kannada flag

== See also ==
- Flag of Karnataka
- Jaya Bharata Jananiya Tanujate
- National Emblem of India
- List of Indian state emblems
