= Naganur (disambiguation) =

Naganur is a village in Belagavi district, Karnataka, India.

Naganur may also refer to:

- Naganur (K.D.), a panchayat village in Belgaum district, Karnataka
- Naganur (K.M.), a village in Belgaum district, Karnataka
- Naganur (K.S.), a village in Belgaum district, Karnataka
- Naganur (P.A.), a village in Belgaum district, Karnataka
- Naganur (P.K.), a village in Belgaum district, Karnataka
