= Alipur, Karnataka =

Town in Karnataka, India

Allipura is a town located in the Gauribidanur Taluk of Chikkaballapur District, Karnataka State, India. It is located off State Highway 94, 55 km from Kempegowda International Airport and 70 km from Bangalore. It is a Muslim-majority village.

Allipura's pin code is 561230. Its postal head office is located in Allipura.

Allipura is surrounded by other small such as Bevinahalli (4 km), Gedare (6 km), Kallinayakanahalli (7 km), and Thondebhavi Hobli (8 km). Kannada, Telugu and Urdu are the local languages spoken in Alipur.

Bangalore, Doddaballapura, Gauribidanur, Hindupur, and Tumkur are the nearby towns and cities of Alipur, to which it has road connections.

== See also ==
- Alipur Sign Language
