= Jyothi Reddy N. =

Indian politician (born 1953)

Jyothi Reddy N. (born 1953) is an Indian politician from Karnataka. She is a former Member of the Legislative Assembly from Gauribidanur Assembly constituency representing the Janata Dal (Secular) Party.

Reddy is from Gauribidanur, Chikkaballapur district, Karnataka. She married N. Rajagopal Reddy. She did her post graduation in Arts at Sri Venkateswara University, Tirupati, Andhra Pradesh.

Reddy became an MLA for the first time winning the 1994 Karnataka Legislative Assembly election from Gauribidanur Assembly constituency representing Janata Dal. She polled 42,159 votes and defeated her nearest rival, S. V. Ashwathanarayana Reddy, an independent candidate, by a margin of 7,885 votes. In 1989 Assembly election from the same constituency, she lost to Ashwathanarayana Reddy, who then contested on an Indian National Congress ticket. Later, she lost the 1999, 2004 and 2008 elections. In 2008 Assembly election, contesting on JDS ticket, she polled 27,480 votes and finished third behind winner, Shivashankara Reddy N H of the Indian National Congress and Ravinarayana Reddy N M of the Bharatiya Janata Party, who finished second. In November 2021, she joined the BJP.
