= Gundapura, Gauribidanur =

Village in Chickballpur District

Gundapura
- Village
- Location in Karnataka, India Gundapura (India)
- Coordinates: 13.6003848°N 77.4879502°E
- Country: India
- State: Karnataka
- District: Chikkaballapura
- Talukas: Gauribidanur
- Elevation: 684 m (2,244 ft)

Population (2011)
  - Total: 1,243

Languages
  - Official: Kannada,
- Time zone: UTC+5:30 (IST)
- PIN: 561208
- Telephone code: 08155
- Vehicle registration: KA 40
- Lok Sabha constituency: Chikballapur (Lok Sabha constituency)

Gundapura is a village in the southern state of Karnataka, India. It is located in the Gauribidanur taluk of Chikkaballapura district in Karnataka. It is situated 4 km away from sub-district headquarter Gauribidanur and 37 km away from district headquarter Chikkaballapura.

Kannada is the official languages in Gundapura.

== Demographics ==
According to Census 2011 information the location code or village code of Gundapura village is 623259. Gundapura belongs to Kadalaveni gram panchayat.

The total geographical area of village is 294.8 hectares. Gundapura has a total population of 1,243 peoples with 610 males and 633 females. There are about 303 houses in Gundapura village. Village literacy rate is 67.7%. Gauribidanur is nearest town to Gundapura which is approximately 4 km away.

== Economy ==
People belonging to the Gundapura village grow very much maize, millet silk, etc. The major occupations of the residents of Gundapura are sericulture and dairy farming. The dairy cooperative is the largest individual milk supplying cooperative in the state.

== Facilities ==
Gundapura has below types of facilities.

- Government primary School – The school is owned by government of Karnataka, located in Gundapura itself.
- Gundapura KMF (Karnataka Milk Federation) Dairy
- Raymond (SSAL- 2) Textile Industry
- Gauribidanur Power Grid
- National Highway-206 – Connects Gauribidanur and Madhugiri.

== Temples ==
- Sri Annapoorneshwari Temple

== See also ==
- Kachamachanahalli
