= Savadi =

Savadi may refer to:

- Savadi, Belgaum, Karnataka
- Savadi, Gadag, Karnataka
- Savadi, Solapur district, Maharashtra
