= H. Nagasandra =

Village in Chickballpur District

H.Nagasandra
- Village
- Location in Karnataka, India H.Nagasandra (India)
- Coordinates: 13.6529844°N 77.4913495°E
- Country: India
- State: Karnataka
- District: Chikkaballapura
- Talukas: Gauribidanur
- Elevation: 707 m (2,320 ft)

Population (2011)
  - Total: 3,189

Languages
  - Official: Kannada
- Time zone: UTC+5:30 (IST)
- PIN: 561208
- Telephone code: 08155
- Vehicle registration: KA 40
- Lok Sabha constituency: Chikballapur (Lok Sabha constituency)

Huduthi Nagasandra commonly known as H. Nagasandra is a village in the southern state of Karnataka, India. It is located in the Gauribidanur taluk of Chikkaballapura district in Karnataka. It is situated 7 km away from sub-district headquarter Gauribidanur and 42 km away from district headquarter Chikkaballapura.

== Demographics ==
According to Census 2011 information the location code or village code of H. Nagasandra village is 623247. H. Nagasandra belongs to Doddakurugodu Gram Panchayat.

The total geographical area of village is 742.5 hectares. H. Nagasandra has a total population of 3,189 peoples with 1,624 males and 1,565 females. There are about 720 houses in H. Nagasandra village. Gauribidanur is nearest town to H. Nagasandra which is approximately 7 km away.

== Economy ==
People belonging to the H. Nagasandra village grow very much maize, millet silk, etc. The major occupations of the residents of H. Nagasandra are dairy farming. The dairy cooperative is the largest individual milk supplying cooperative in the state.

== Facilities ==
H. Nagasandra has below types of facilities.

- Anganawadi Center
- Government higher primary School
- H. Nagasandra KMF (Karnataka Milk Federation) Dairy
- Post Office

== Temples ==
- Bharatha Matha temple
- sri Shanimahathma Swami Temple
- Universal Good News Church

== Notable people ==
- N. H. Shivashankara Reddy - Indian politician who is a Former Member of the Karnataka Legislative Assembly from the INC for Gauribidanur Taluk.

== See also ==
- B. Bommasandra, Gauribidanur
