= Kenkere, Gauribidanur =

Village in Chickballpur District

Kenkere
- Village
- Location in Karnataka, India Kenkere (India)
- Coordinates: 13.574522°N 77.456531°E
- Country: India
- State: Karnataka
- District: Chikkaballapura
- Talukas: Gauribidanur
- Elevation: 684 m (2,244 ft)

Population (2011)
  - Total: 1,227

Languages
  - Official: Kannada, Telugu
- Time zone: UTC+5:30 (IST)
- PIN: 561210
- Telephone code: 08155
- Vehicle registration: KA 40
- Lok Sabha constituency: Chikballapur (Lok Sabha constituency)

Kenkere is a village in the southern state of Karnataka, India. It is located in the Gauribidanur taluk of Chikkaballapura district in Karnataka. It is situated 8 km away from sub-district headquarter Gauribidanur and 42 km away from district headquarter Chikkaballapura.

== Demographics ==
According to Census 2011 information the location code or village code of Kenkere village is 623220. Kenkere village belongs to Gedare gram panchayat.

The total geographical area of village is 294.55 hectares. Kenkere has a total population of 1,275 peoples with 638 males and 637 females. There are about 327 houses in Kenkere village. Gauribidanur is nearest town to Kenkere which is approximately 8 km away.

== Economy ==
People belonging to the Kenkere village grow very much maize, millet silk, etc. The major occupations of the residents of Kenkere are sericulture and dairy farming. The dairy cooperative is the largest individual milk supplying cooperative in the state.

== Facilities ==
Kenkere has below types of facilities.

- Government higher primary School
- Government high School
- Kenkere KMF (Karnataka Milk Federation) Dairy
- Government Grocery store

== See also ==
- Nagaragere
