= Kadalaveni =

- village
- Location in Karnataka, India Kadalaveni (India)
- Coordinates: 13.60082°N 77.47658°E
- Country: India
- State: Karnataka
- District: Chikkaballapura
- Talukas: Gauribidanur
- Elevation: 686 m (2,251 ft)

Population (2011)
  - Total: 2,512

Languages
  - Official: Kannada, Telugu
- Time zone: UTC+5:30 (IST)
- PIN: 561210
- Telephone code: 08155
- Vehicle registration: KA 40
- Lok Sabha constituency: Chikballapur (Lok Sabha constituency)

Kadalaveni is a village in the southern state of Karnataka, India. It is located in the Gauribidanur taluk of Chikkaballapura district in Karnataka. It is situated 6 km away from sub-district headquarter Gauribidanur and 44 km away from district headquarter Chikkaballapura

== History ==
It is believed that the Kadalaveni village name was originated from native language Kannada word "Kaalu Harida Oni (ಕಾಲು ಹರಿದ ಓಣಿ)" means Quarter flowed passage, with over time it has changed to "Kadalaveni".

== Demographics ==
According to Census 2011 information the location code or village code of Kadalaveni village is 623262. As per 2009 stats, Kadalaveni village is also a gram panchayat. Villages in Kadalaveni Gram Panchayat are Gundapura, Maralur, Vyachakurahalli, Kadalaveni and Udamalodu.

The total geographical area of village is 880.32 hectares. Kadalaveni has a total population of 2,512 peoples with 1,254 males and 1,258 females. There are about 599 houses in Kadalaveni village. Gauribidanur is nearest town to Kadalaveni which is approximately 6 km away.

== Facilities ==
Kadalaveni has below types of facilities.

- Government higher primary School – The school is owned by government of Karnataka, located in Kadalaveni itself.
- Government High School – The school is owned by government of Karnataka, located in Kadalaveni itself.
- Canara Bank – The bank is located in Kadalaveni itself towards Gauribidanur Road.
- Gram panchayat office (mandal office) – At center of the village.
- KMF (Karnataka Milk Federation) Dairy – Located behind Government higher primary School, Kadalaveni.
- Government grocery store – Owned by government of Karnataka.
- Post office - Owned by Government of India.
- National Highway-206 – Connects Gauribidanur and Madhugiri.
- Panchayat Library.

== Temples ==
- Hanuman temple
- Maramma temple
- Ganesha Temple
- Mosque

== See also ==
Vyachakurahalli
