= Vyachakurahalli =

Village in Chickballpur District

- village
- Location in Karnataka, India Vyachakurahalli (India)
- Coordinates: 13.6141048°N 77.4593203°E
- Country: India
- State: Karnataka
- District: Chikkaballapura
- Talukas: Gauribidanur
- Elevation: 686 m (2,251 ft)

Population (2011)
  - Total: 1,033

Languages
  - Official: Kannada, Telugu
- Time zone: UTC+5:30 (IST)
- PIN: 561208
- Telephone code: 08155
- Vehicle registration: KA 40
- Lok Sabha constituency: Chikballapur (Lok Sabha constituency)

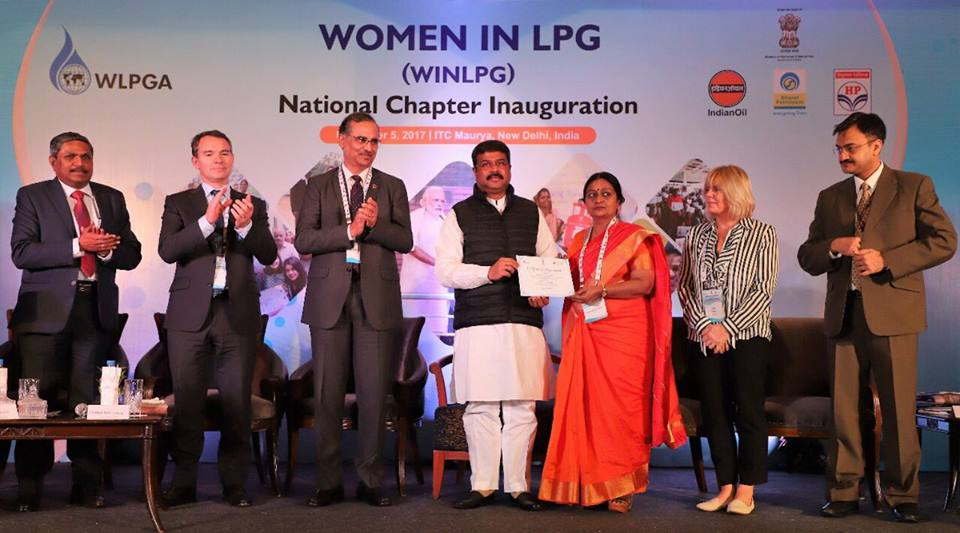
Hon'ble Minister Shri Dharmendra Pradhan appreciated the efforts put in by IOCian Ms. Moti Sai Vasudevan and LPG Distributor Ms. Geetha for "Mission Smokeless Village" initiative in Karnataka

Vyachakurahalli is a village in the southern state of Karnataka, India. It is located in the Gauribidanur taluk of Chikkaballapura district in Karnataka. It is situated 9 km away from sub-district headquarter Gauribidanur and 45 km away from district headquarter Chikkaballapura.

On Dec 8, 2015, Vyachakurahalli village in Karnataka was declared "India's first smokeless village" by the Ministry of Petroleum and Natural Gas, Govt of India. Following the Mission Smokeless Village project, undertaken by Indian Oil Corporation with the objective of helping rural women regain their health and to make cooking easier, all 274 households in the village had shifted to LPG stoves. The country's first smokeless village Vyachakurahalli had entered into the Limca Book of Records-2017.

== Demographics ==
According to Census 2011 information the location code or village code of Vyachakurahalli village is 623261. Vyachakurahalli has a total population of 1,033 peoples with 539 males and 494 females. There are about 274 houses in Vyachakurahalli village. Gauribidanur is nearest town to Vyachakurahalli which is approximately 9 km away.

== Mission Smokeless Village ==
On Dec 8, 2015 Vyachakurahalli village in Karnataka has become India's first smokeless village. The Ministry of Petroleum and Natural Gas had declared the village smokeless as all 274 households had made a shift to LPG stoves.

Indian Oil Corporation (IOC) led the 'Mission Smokeless Village' project with an idea to help women regain their health, and to make cooking easier. This project was started with the understanding that, In India, cooking has been a tough task in many villages. The firewood used as fuel makes women more prone to pneumonia and kitchens get filled with soot, which in turn leads to health problems.

LPG stoves and cylinders were made available for the villagers. An awareness programme was conducted for the villagers to tell them the importance of going smokeless. As part of this project many guidelines were given and the women were taught how to operate an LPG stove and how to handle the stoves and cylinders carefully. The women were told to switch off the regulator every night. They were further asked to not keep the gas stove switched on with the utensils on top of it.

In year 2017, India's first smokeless village Vyachakurahalli had entered into the Limca Book of Records-2017.

== Facilities ==
Vyachakurahalli has below types of facilities.

- Government higher primary School – The school is owned by government of Karnataka, located in Vyachakurahalli itself.
- Vyachakurahalli KMF (Karnataka Milk Federation) Dairy
- Government grocery store – Owned by government of Karnataka.

== Temples ==
- Sri Anjaneya Swamy Temple
- Sri Nagalambika Kshetra
- Sri vadisallma devate

== See also ==
- Kurudi
