= B. Bommasandra, Gauribidanur =

Village in Chickballpur District

B. Bommasandra
- Village
- Location in Karnataka, India B. Bommasandra (India)
- Coordinates: 13.6118311°N 77.605592°E
- Country: India
- State: Karnataka
- District: Chikkaballapura
- Talukas: Gauribidanur
- Elevation: 686 m (2,251 ft)

Population (2011)
  - Total: 2,490

Languages
  - Official: Kannada
- Time zone: UTC+5:30 (IST)
- PIN: 561206
- Telephone code: 08155
- Vehicle registration: KA 40
- Lok Sabha constituency: Chikballapur (Lok Sabha constituency)

B. Bommasandra is a village in the southern state of Karnataka, India. It is located in the Gauribidanur taluk of Chikkaballapura district in Karnataka. It is situated 14 km away from sub-district headquarter Gauribidanur and 32 km away from district headquarter Chikkaballapura.

== Demographics ==
According to Census 2011 information the location code or village code of B. Bommasandra village is 623333. B. Bommasandra village is also a gram panchayat. Villages comes under B. Bommasandra gram Panchayat are Yarranagenahalli, Venkatapura, Siddenahalli, Chinchenahalli, Cheelamanahalli and B.bommasandra.

The total geographical area of village is 519.49 hectares. B. Bommasandra has a total population of 2,490 peoples with 1,235 males and 1,255 females. There are about 593 houses in B. Bommasandra village. Gauribidanur is nearest town to B. Bommasandra which is approximately 14 km away.

== Economy ==
People belonging to the B. Bommasandra village grow very much maize, millet silk, etc. The major occupations of the residents of B. Bommasandra are dairy farming. The dairy cooperative is the largest individual milk supplying cooperative in the state.

== Facilities ==
B. Bommasandra has below types of facilities.

- Government higher primary School
- Government high school
- B. Bommasandra KMF (Karnataka Milk Federation) Dairy
- Gram Panchayat Office
- Post Office
- State Highway - 94

== Temples ==
- Sri Lakshmi Narasimhaswamy Temple
- Sri Anjaneya Swamy Temple
- Jamia Masjid

== See also ==
- Doddakurugodu
