= Laxman Savadi =

Indian politician

Laxman Sangappa Savadi

Minister for Co-operation, Government of Karnataka (excluding Agriculture Marketing)
- Incumbent
- Assumed office 12 August 2026
- Governor: Thawar Chand Gehlot
- Chief Minister: D. K. Shivakumar

8th Deputy Chief Minister of Karnataka
- In office 26 August 2019 – 28 July 2021 Serving with C. N. Ashwath Narayan and Govind Karjol
- Governor: Vajubhai Vala; Thawar Chand Gehlot
- Chief Minister: B. S. Yediyurappa
- Preceded by: G. Parameshwara
- Succeeded by: D. K. Shivakumar

Minister of Transport, Government of Karnataka
- In office 20 August 2019 – 28 July 2021
- Chief Minister: B. S. Yediyurappa
- Preceded by: D. C. Thammanna
- Succeeded by: B. Sriramulu

Minister of Agriculture, Government of Karnataka
- In office 27 September 2019 – 10 February 2020
- Chief Minister: B. S. Yediyurappa
- Preceded by: N. H. Shivashankara Reddy
- Succeeded by: B. C. Patil

Minister for Co-operation, Government of Karnataka
- In office 7 June 2008 – 9 February 2012
- Chief Ministers: B. S. Yediyurappa; D. V. Sadananda Gowda
- Preceded by: G. T. Devegowda
- Succeeded by: B. J. Puttaswamy

Member of the Karnataka Legislative Assembly
- Incumbent
- Assumed office 2023
- Preceded by: Mahesh Kumathalli
- Constituency: Athani

Member of the Karnataka Legislative Assembly
- In office 2004–2018
- Constituency: Athani

Member of the Karnataka Legislative Council
- In office 17 February 2020 – 14 April 2023
- Preceded by: Rizwan Arshad
- Succeeded by: Jagadish Shettar
- Constituency: Elected by members of the Legislative Assembly

Personal details
- Born: 16 February 1960 (age 66) Naganur (P.K.), Mysore State, India
- Party: Indian National Congress (2023–present)
- Other political affiliations: Bharatiya Janata Party (until 2023)

Laxman Sangappa Savadi (born 16 February 1960) is an Indian politician serving as the Minister for Co-operation in the Government of Karnataka since August 2026. A member of the Indian National Congress, he represents the Athani Assembly constituency in the Karnataka Legislative Assembly. He previously served as a Deputy Chief Minister of Karnataka from 2019 to 2021 in the government of B. S. Yediyurappa.

Savadi was elected to Legislative Assembly from Athani on the Bharatiya Janata Party ticket in 2004, 2008 and 2013. He lost the seat in 2018, subsequently served in the Legislative Council between 2020 and 2023, and joined the Congress in April 2023 after the BJP denied him its nomination for the Assembly Election. He returned to the Assembly after winning the 2023 election from Athani.

== Early life and education ==
Savadi was born on 16 February 1960. He is from the Athani area of Belagavi district. He completed his second pre-university course (PUC) at S. S. M. S. College in Athani in 1978.

== Political career ==
=== Early elections and BJP career ===
Savadi contested the Athani seat as independent candidate in 1999 Karnataka Legislative Assembly election, but lost to the Congress candidate, Shahajan Ismail Dongargaon. He won his first Assembly election in 2004 as a BJP candidate and retained Athani in the 2008 and 2013 elections.

Following the BJP's formation of the Karnataka government under Chief Minister B. S. Yediyurappa in 2008, Savadi was assigned the Co-operation department. He continued as a minister under the administration of Chief Minister D. V. Sadananda Gowda as well. He resigned from the ministry on 8 February 2012 following a controversy in the Assembly.

In the 2018 Karnataka Legislative Assembly election, Savadi was defeated in Athani by Congress candidate Mahesh Kumathalli by a margin of 2,331 votes.

=== Deputy Chief Minister and Legislative Council (2019-2021) ===
Savadi joined the Cabinet formed by B. S. Yediyurappa on 20 August 2019. On 26 August, he was designated one of Karnataka's three deputy chief ministers, alongside Govind Karjol and C. N. Ashwath Narayan, and was assigned the Transport portfolio. At the time of his appointment, he was not a member of either house of the state legislature.

He was elected to the Karnataka Legislative Council on 17 February 2020, receiving 113 of the 120 votes cast in a by-election to a seat vacated by Rizwan Arshad.

His tenure as Deputy Chief Minister ended in July 2021 with the departure of the Yediyurappa ministry. Savadi remained a member of the Legislative Council until his resignation in April 2023.

=== Move to Congress and return to the Assembly (2023) ===
Before the 2023 election, the BJP selected sitting Athani MLA Mahesh Kumathalli as its candidate rather than Savadi. Savadi announced his resignation from the BJP in April 2023 and joined the Congress on 14 April after meeting party leaders Siddaramaiah, D. K. Shivakumar and Randeep Surjewala. He also resigned his Legislative Council seat.

Contesting Athani as a Congress candidate, he defeated Kumathalli by 76,122 votes. Savadi received 1,31,404 votes against Kumathalli's 55,282.

=== Return to the Karnataka Cabinet (2026-present) ===
On 3 August 2026, Savadi was sworn in as a cabinet minister in an expansion of the ministry led by Chief Minister D. K. Shivakumar. On 12 August, he was assigned the Co-operation portfolio, excluding Agriculture Marketing, which remained with the chief minister. He was also assigned responsibility as district in-charge minister for Uttara Kannada district.

== 2012 Assembly controversy ==
In February 2012, television cameras recorded Savadi and his fellow BJP minister C. C. Patil viewing explicit material on a mobile phone during the proceedings of the Legislative Assembly. Savadi, Patil and another minister Krishna J. Palemar resigned from their ministerial positions on 8 February amid the controversy.

A legislative committee investigated the incident. In its report presented in March 2012, the committee found prima facie evidence that Savadi had viewed explicit clips, but described the viewing as unintentional and recommended that he be admonished. The committee did not find sufficient evidence against Patil and Palemar. The committee also recommended restrictions on mobile-phone use in the Assembly.
