= Kirpa Ram =

British Indian George Cross recipient

- Born: 1916; Bilaspur, Himachal Pradesh
- Died: 12 September 1945 (aged 28–29); Thondebhavi, Bangalore
- Military career
- Allegiance: British India
- Branch: British Indian Army
- Service years: 1935–1945
- Rank: Naik
- Service number: 15634
- Units: 8th Battalion, 13th Frontier Force Rifles
- Conflicts: Second World War; Burma campaign
- Awards: George Cross

Naik Kirpa Ram, GC (1916 – 12 September 1945) was an Indian soldier and a posthumous recipient of the George Cross, the highest British and Commonwealth award for gallantry not in the face of the enemy.

== Military career ==
Born in 1916, Kirpa volunteered to join the Indian Army in 1935. During the Second World War he was a member of 8th Battalion, 13th Frontier Force Rifles. He served in the Burma Campaign and his unit then returned to India.

On 12 September 1945, during a field firing exercise at a rest camp at Thondebhavi, Bangalore, a rifle grenade misfired and fell only eight yards from Kirpa's section. The 28-year-old soldier rushed forward, shouting at his men to take cover and attempted to throw it to a safe distance. It exploded in his hand, wounding him fatally, but his self-sacrifice meant that only two men of the section were slightly wounded. The posthumous award of the George Cross to Kirpa was announced on 15 March 1946, the citation read:

St. James's Palace, S.W.1, 15 March 1946.

The KING has been graciously pleased to approve the posthumous award of the GEORGE CROSS, in recognition of most conspicuous gallantry in carrying out hazardous work in a very brave manner, to:-

No. 15634 Naik KIRPA RAM, 8th Battalion, 13th Frontier Force Rifles, Indian Army.

In 2002 Kirpa's GC was among the contents of a trunk stolen from his widow's house at Bhapral, Bilaspur, Himachal Pradesh. Although investigations were made at the time, no trace was found until the medal was presented for auction in London in late 2009. The medal was due to go under the hammer on 2 December 2009, but after the widow, Brahmi Devi, was alerted to the sale, steps were taken to suspend the sale. Finally, on 11 May 2015, Kirpa's GC was returned to his widow by the British government.
