= Anudi, Gauribidanur =

Village in Chickballpur District

Anudi
- Village
- Location in Karnataka, India Anudi (India)
- Coordinates: 13.6310743°N 77.3988403°E
- Country: India
- State: Karnataka
- District: Chikkaballapura
- Talukas: Gauribidanur
- Elevation: 684 m (2,244 ft)

Population (2011)
  - Total: 1,520

Languages
  - Official: Kannada, Telugu
- Time zone: UTC+5:30 (IST)
- PIN: 561210
- Telephone code: 08155
- Vehicle registration: KA 40
- Lok Sabha constituency: Chikballapur (Lok Sabha constituency)

Anudi is a village in the southern state of Karnataka, India. It is located in the Gauribidanur taluk of Chikkaballapura district in Karnataka. It is situated 15 km away from sub-district headquarter Gauribidanur and 50 km away from district headquarter Chikkaballapura.

== Demographics ==
According to Census 2011 information the location code or village code of Anudi village is 623198. Anudi village Belongs to Kurudi gram panchayat.

The total geographical area of village is 582.13 hectares. Anudi has a total population of 1,520 peoples with 761 males and 759 females. There are about 374 houses in Anudi village. Gauribidanur is nearest town to Anudi which is approximately 15 km away.

== Economy ==
Agriculture the main occupation of Anudi people. People belonging to the Anudi village grow very much maize, millet silk, etc. The major occupations of the residents of Anudi is dairy farming. The dairy cooperative is the largest individual milk supplying cooperative in the state.

== Facilities ==
Anudi has below types of facilities.

- Government higher primary School
- A V N High School
- Anudi KMF (Karnataka Milk Federation) Dairy

== Temples ==
- Anjaneya Temple
