= Mallasandra, Gauribidanur =

Village in Chickballpur District

Mallasandra
- Village
- Location in Karnataka, India Mallasandra (India)
- Coordinates: 13.5278444°N 77.4610798°E
- Country: India
- State: Karnataka
- District: Chikkaballapura
- Talukas: Gauribidanur
- Elevation: 684 m (2,244 ft)

Population (2011)
  - Total: 1,406

Languages
  - Official: Kannada,
- Time zone: UTC+5:30 (IST)
- PIN: 561213
- Telephone code: 08155
- Vehicle registration: KA 40
- Lok Sabha constituency: Chikballapur (Lok Sabha constituency)

Mallasandra is a village in the southern state of Karnataka, India. It is located in the Gauribidanur taluk of Chikkaballapura district in Karnataka. It is situated 18 km away from sub-district headquarter Gauribidanur and 35 km away from district headquarter Chikkaballapura.

== Demographics ==
According to Census 2011 information the location code or village code of Mallasandra village is 623354. Mallasandra village belongs to G Bommsandra gram panchayat.

The total geographical area of village is 583.3 hectares. Mallasandra has a total population of 1,406 peoples with 706 males and 700 females. There are about 345 houses in Mallasandra village. Gauribidanur is nearest town to Mallasandra which is approximately 18 km away.

== Economy ==
People belonging to the Mallasandra village grow very much maize, millet silk, etc. The major occupations of the residents of Mallasandra are sericulture and dairy farming. The dairy cooperative is the largest individual milk supplying cooperative in the state.

== Facilities ==
Mallasandra has below types of facilities.

- Government higher primary School
- Mallasandra KMF (Karnataka Milk Federation) Dairy
- kitturu rani chennamma residencial school

== Temples ==
- Basava Temple
- Kalika devi Temple
- Grama Devate Temple
- goerge ashram
