= Gedare, Gauribidanur =

Village in Chickballpur District

Gedare
- Village
- Location in Karnataka, India Gedare (India)
- Coordinates: 13.5345944°N 77.4618754°E
- Country: India
- State: Karnataka
- District: Chikkaballapura
- Talukas: Gauribidanur
- Elevation: 684 m (2,244 ft)

Population (2011)
  - Total: 1,637

Languages
  - Official: Kannada, Telugu
- Time zone: UTC+5:30 (IST)
- PIN: 561213
- Telephone code: 08155
- Vehicle registration: KA 40
- Lok Sabha constituency: Chikballapur (Lok Sabha constituency)

Gedare is a village in the southern state of Karnataka, India. It is located in the Gauribidanur taluk of Chikkaballapura district in Karnataka. It is situated 12 km away from sub-district headquarter Gauribidanur and 43 km away from district headquarter Chikkaballapura.

== Demographics ==
According to Census 2011 information the location code or village code of Gedare village is 623229. Gedare village is also a gram panchayat. Villages coming under Gedare gram Panchayat are Singanahalli, Narasimhanahalli, Kondapura, Kenkere, Kachamachenahalli, Gedare and Dimmagattanahalli.

The total geographical area of village is 348.29 hectares. Gedare has a total population of 1,637 peoples with 819 males and 818 females. There are about 402 houses in Gedare village. Gauribidanur is the nearest town to Gedare which is approximately 12 km away.

== Economy ==
People belonging to the Gedare village grow maize and millet silk. The major occupations of the residents of Gedare are sericulture and dairy farming. The dairy cooperative is the largest individual milk supplier cooperative in the state.

== Facilities ==
The facilities in Gedare include:

- Government higher primary School
- Gedare KMF (Karnataka Milk Federation) Dairy
- Government Grocery store
- Gedare Gram Panchayat Office
- Preliminary Government Hospital

== Temples ==
- Hanuman Temple
- Shiva Temple
- Chowdeshwari Temple
- Gaalamma Temple and
- Basava Temple

== Tourist Attractions ==
- Gadare hills caves

== See also ==
- Doddakurugodu
