= K. H. Puttaswamy Gowda =

Indian politician (born 2005)

K. Puttaswamy Gowda (born 1954) is an Indian politician from Karnataka. He is a member of the Karnataka Legislative Assembly from the Gauribidanur Assembly constituency in Chikkaballapura district. He won the 2023 Karnataka Legislative Assembly election as an independent candidate.

== Early life and education ==
Gowda is from Nagamangala, Mandya district, Karnataka. His late father was Honee Gowda. He completed his graduation in commerce in 1975, at RC Degree College which is affiliated with Bangalore University.

== Career ==
Gowda won from the Gauribidanur Assembly constituency as an independent candidate in the 2023 Karnataka Legislative Assembly election. He polled 83,837 votes and defeated his nearest rival, N. H. Shivashankara Reddy of Indian National Congress, by a huge margin of 37,286 votes.
