= Naganur (K.D.) =

- Village
- Country: India
- State: Karnataka
- District: Belgaum
- Talukas: Hukeri

Languages
  - Official: Kannada
- Time zone: UTC+5:30 (IST)

Naganur (K.D.) is a panchayat village in Belgaum district of Karnataka, India.

There are four villages in the Naganur K D gram panchayat: Naganur (K.D.), Aldhal, Bidrewadi, and Naganur (K.M.).
