= Mahesh Kumathalli =

Indian politician (born 1962)

Mahesh Iranagouda Kumathalli

MLA And Chairman of Karnataka State Slum Development Board
- In office 15 May 2018 – 28 July 2019
- Preceded by: Laxman Savadi
- Succeeded by: Himself
- Constituency: Athani

MLA
- In office 5 December 2019 – 13 May 2023
- Preceded by: Himself
- Succeeded by: Laxman Savadi
- Constituency: Athani

Personal details
- Born: Mahesh Iranagouda Kumathalli; 1 January 1962 (age 64) Savadi (Athani taluk, Karnataka, India)
- Party: Bharatiya Janata Party
- Education: KLE Engineering College, Belagavi
- Profession: Agriculturist, politician

Mahesh Iranagouda Kumathalli is an Indian politician. He was elected to the Karnataka Legislative Assembly from Athani in the 2018 Karnataka Legislative Assembly election as a member of the Indian National Congress and in 2019 by election as a member of BJP.
