= Maralur, Gauribidanur =

Village in Chickballpur District

- village
- Location in Karnataka, India Maralur, Gauribidanur (India)
- Coordinates: 13.6271131°N 77.4788014°E
- Country: India
- State: Karnataka
- District: Chikkaballapura
- Talukas: Gauribidanur
- Elevation: 684 m (2,244 ft)

Population (2011)
  - Total: 1,926

Languages
  - Official: Kannada, Telugu
- Time zone: UTC+5:30 (IST)
- PIN: 561208
- Telephone code: 08155
- Vehicle registration: KA 40
- Lok Sabha constituency: Chikballapur (Lok Sabha constituency)

Maralur, Gauribidanur is a village in the southern state of Karnataka, India. It is located in the Gauribidanur taluk of Chikkaballapura district in Karnataka. It is situated 6 km away from sub-district headquarter Gauribidanur and 45 km away from district headquarter Chikkaballapura

== Demographics ==
According to Census 2011 information the location code or village code of Maralur village is 623251. Maralur belongs to Kadalaveni gram panchayat.

The total geographical area of village is 702.91 hectares. Maralur has a total population of 1,926 peoples with 970 males and 956 females. There are about 499 houses in Maralur village. Village literacy rate is 56.4% and the Female Literacy rate is 24.2%. Gauribidanur is nearest town to Maralur which is approximately 6 km away.

== Economy ==
People belonging to the Maralur village grow very much maize, millet silk, etc. The major occupations of the residents of Maralur are sericulture and dairy farming. The dairy cooperative is the largest individual milk supplying cooperative in the state.

== Facilities ==
Maralur has below types of facilities.

- Government primary School – The school is owned by government of Karnataka, located in Maralur itself.
- Maralur KMF (Karnataka Milk Federation) Dairy

== Temples ==
- Sri Anjaneya Swamy Temple
