= Kondapura, Gauribidanur =

Village in Chickballpur District

Kondapura
- Village
- Location in Karnataka, India Kondapura (India)
- Coordinates: 13.5185234°N 77.4610798°E
- Country: India
- State: Karnataka
- District: Chikkaballapura
- Talukas: Gauribidanur
- Elevation: 684 m (2,244 ft)

Population (2011)
  - Total: 1,126

Languages
  - Official: Kannada, Telugu
- Time zone: UTC+5:30 (IST)
- PIN: 561210
- Telephone code: 08155
- Vehicle registration: KA 40
- Lok Sabha constituency: Chikballapur (Lok Sabha constituency)

Kondapura is a village in the southern state of Karnataka, India. It is located in the Gauribidanur taluk of Chikkaballapura district in Karnataka. It is situated 13 km away from sub-district headquarter Gauribidanur and 46 km away from district headquarter Chikkaballapura.

== Demographics ==
According to Census 2011 information the location code or village code of Kondapura village is 623228. Kondapura village belongs to Gedare gram panchayat.

The total geographical area of village is 438.85 hectares. Kondapura has a total population of 1,126 peoples with 561 males and 565 females. There are about 262 houses in Kondapura village. Gauribidanur is nearest town to Kondapura which is approximately 13 km away.

== Economy ==
People belonging to the Kondapura village grow very much maize, millet silk, etc. The major occupations of the residents of Kondapura are sericulture and dairy farming. The dairy cooperative is the largest individual milk supplying cooperative in the state.

== Facilities ==
Kondapura has below types of facilities.

- Government higher primary School
- Kondapura KMF (Karnataka Milk Federation) Dairy

== Temples ==
- Ganapati Temple
- Ramanjaneya Swamy Temple
