= I Monetary Advisory =

Indian investment company

I Monetary Advisory (IMA) was an Indian investment company, with headquarters in Bangalore. Its collapse was one in a long line of similar collapses over the preceding few years, of companies purporting to be Islamic banking companies, with investors in India and the United Arab Emirates, that investigating authorities afterwards stated to have been Ponzi schemes, including: Heera Group; Morgenall, Capital Plus, and Capital Infrastructure (all collapsed in 2018); Injaz International, Ajmera, Aleef, Aala Ventures, Ambidant, and Burraqh; and Sunfeast Infotech, SpeakAsia, MMA Forex, Gold AE, Ferryland Tourism, UT Markets and Exential Group. Total losses to investors over 14 such companies have been conservatively estimated at ₹5,000 crore (US$520 million) with the loss due to IMA alone estimated at ₹2,500 crore (US$260 million)

== Precursor and founding in 2013 ==
The precursor to I Monetary Advisory was a company co-founded in 2006 by Mohammad Mansoor Khan and a business partner by the name of Iliyas, which they gave the name Iliyas-Mansoor Advisory. This company was not successful, and was dissolved in 2008. Mansoor Khan's next company kept the same IMA initials.

Founded in 2013, according to records at the Ministry of Corporate Affairs and contrary to claims made on the company's own website, I Monetary Advisory Private Limited was presented as an Islamic banking company. Mansoor Khan encouraged ulemas and other people with influence in the Muslim community to believe that it was a continuation of the same company founded in 2006 and was a successful business of several years' standing, promising them that the company would build hospitals and schools.

Under the umbrella of the IMA Group, it later diversified into other businesses, including jewellery (with the name IMA Jewels a.k.a. IMA Jewellers), real estate (IMA Builders and Developers founded in 2017), bullion trading (IMA Bullion and Trading founded in 2014, IMA Bullion in 2015, and IMA Gold), groceries (Mulberry Greens), pharmacy (Frontline Pharma), hospitals (Frontline Multispeciality Hospital), and publishing. Amongst other things, the publishing company subsidiary published an edition of the Qur'an, and several books by author Muhammed Shuaibullah Khan (Goat of Charity, Features of the Islamic Marriage, and Investment in Joint Stock Companies); the construction company was involved in the construction of Madrassa Maseehul Uloom; and the educational subsidiary funded a computer lab in Darul Uloom Deoband. Further interests included supermarkets, planned shopping malls, and a raft of other subsidiaries (all structured as partnerships): IM Digital, IM Trends, IM Entertainment, IM Zayee, MMK Institute of Education (established 2015), and IMA Women Empowerment Business Module (established 2015).

== Official investigations begin ==
The company first came to the attention of authorities in 2015 because of the large discounts that IMA Jewels was giving on purchases of gold in its stores, but nothing was done because of a legal loophole and inaction by investors. The Reserve Bank of India (RBI) suspected the company of being a Ponzi scheme and tipped off the Revenue Department. However, the latter was unable to take action for two reasons: first, the Karnataka Protection of Interest of Depositors in Financial Establishments Act (PIDFE) only allowed action to protect depositors, and an Islamic banking company is structured so that people paying money to it are legally partners in the business and not investors making deposits; and second, no-one actually complained whilst the company was still paying them.

By 2017, Mansoor Khan was being investigated, with searches of his properties by the Revenue Department in April of that year, and his not having filed income tax returns since 2015. On 16 November 2018, the Assistant Commissioner of Bangalore North Sub-Division issued a forfeiture notice against IMA, which Mansoor dismissed in a public statement posted on Facebook. That same month, a public notice was issued by the Revenue Department asking for investors with complaints to come forward; however, none did. In the following month, December, Mansoor Khan contended in a formal reply to investigators that the company did not accept deposits from investors, but dealt in precious stones and metals; that it did not require licence from the RBI or the Securities and Exchange Board of India (SEBI); that lack of depositors meant that the PIDFE Act did not apply; and that the company was a Limited Liability Partnership with partners not depositors. The authorities could have taken action with the SEBI and RBI attaching the company's properties, as they had in other earlier cases of other companies, had not the assistant commissioner's powers to do so been curtailed by the Karnataka state government at the same time, for unrelated reasons.

== Closure and aftermath ==
In March 2019, the company ceased paying dividends to investors. The company's offices were closed to customers on 29 May 2019. Complaints by investors, which numbered 41,000 within three weeks of the closure, finally enabled investigators to proceed where they had been unable to before.

By 17 June 2019, the Indian police were investigating allegations that the company had been a Ponzi scheme, and where the investors' money had gone. By the end of June 2019, complaints had risen to 51,500, a Special Investigation Team had been formed, and SIT raids to the offices of various IMA businesses had recovered ₹30 crore (US$3.1 million) in precious stones and metals, with a further ₹197 crore (US$20 million) in properties attached by the Enforcement Directorate and ₹11 crore (US$1.1 million) in an account with HDFC Bank held in confidence under the Pradhan Mantri Garib Kalyan Yojana (PMGKY). Mansoor Khan had deposited ₹44 crore (US$4.6 million) in bank accounts, paying ₹22 crore (US$2.3 million) in tax under the terms of the PMGKY amnesty. Mansoor Khan claimed on social media that the company actually had had ₹1,350 crore (US$140 million) in assets.

The total loss to investors was being estimated by police at ₹2,500 crore (US$260 million), with the Enforcement Directorate stating that based upon an analysis of 105 bank accounts related to IMA it believed that Mansoor Khan had received ₹4,000 crore (US$420 million).

Mansoor Khan, main accused and wanted in the multi-crore financial fraud, was arrested by the Enforcement Directorate (ED) in New Delhi.

The lawyer representing him submitted that Khan has been suffering from cardiac ailments and requested that he be provided medical care. The Special Investigation Team (SIT) probing the case did not seek his custody. The court directed prison officials to ensure that Khan be provided medical treatment and that in the event of an emergency, he be taken to Sri Jayadeva Institute of Cardiovascular Sciences and Research and not Victoria Hospital.The accused, through his advocate, also submitted that he was facing threat to his life and requested security cover. The court directed the Prisons Department to provide security cover and not allow any visitors during his stay in the prison.SIT officials said they are gathering more evidence to question Khan and are also giving him time to get treated for his ailments.

=== Politicians affected ===
Claims reputedly made by Mansoor Khan on WhatsApp embroiled R. Roshan Baig in the affair, by asserting that Baig had failed to return ₹400 crore (US$42 million) in money that was intended to fund Baig's political campaign. Mansoor's accusations were vehemently denied by Roshan in a post to Twitter, where he asserted that his only relationship to IMA Group companies was "as a legislator" and in relation to the work that IMA had done with a school in his constituency.

However, a week later Baig was suspended from the Congress Party for what an official party statement described as "anti-party activities"; with newspaper reports speculating that members of his party had considered the claimed link to IMA being the final straw that tipped the balance against a party member who had been highly critical of the party and its leadership, and who had already threatened to leave it.

Other projects connected to Baig were a mushaira and the printing of a newspaper (both discussed further on), and Haj training camps, all funded by IMA.

=== Schools and hospitals ===
The school in Baig's constituency was the V.K. Obaidullah School in Shivajinagar, whose future was uncertain immediately following the closure of IMA. It had been partly administered by the company per an agreement with the Karnataka government made in 2015, with the state providing just 15 teachers and IMA paying for 90, at a cost of ₹36 lakh (US$37,000) per annum.

Mansoor Khan had previously, in March 2018, threatened to pull IMA's support from the school in another posting to social media. Eleven days after IMA closed, the 92 staff that it (by then) employed stopped turning up to work, prompting the government to transfer state teachers from other schools in order to make up. The government found that none of the IMA-employed primary school teachers had passed the Teachers Eligibility Test, a requirement to be employed by the state as a primary school teacher, and that some of the IMA-employed teachers did not have teaching qualifications. State-employed staff at the school claimed that IMA-employed staff had been employed in return for investing in IMA companies, rather than on the basis of having qualifications (some did not even have a Secondary School Leaving Certificate) and that IMA had operated with the goal of eventually employing all of the teachers at the school.

The existing state-funded staff comprised 2 primary school teachers and 11 high school teachers (the numbers employed having risen slightly since 2015), to which were added a further 22 primary school teachers and 2 high school teachers. Policemen were employed to cover for the IMA-employed school watchmen who had also stopped working, and students below primary school level were given a leave of absence. Parents and others did not find this satisfactory. The state-funded schools from which teachers had been transferred found themselves short of teachers; and the transferred teachers could instruct in the Tamil, Telugu, and Urdu languages, but could not teach in English, which is what parents at VKO had signed up for when enrolling their children at the school.

Attempts were made to distance Frontline Multispeciality Hospital, located on the Venkataswamy Naidu Road in Shivajinagar, from IMA when the problems surfaced. The IMA name and logo were removed from the sign on the front of the hospital. The hospital reported that it did not have funds to pay for the ₹20 lakh (US$21,000) worth of pharmaceutical supplies that had been delivered to it on credit, and that it was operating with a skeleton of its normal staff of 100 people. At the associated Frontline Pharma chain of pharmacies, stock bought on credit was boxed up and sent back to its suppliers and the company was shut down, as it had no money to continue operating.

Employees at Frontline Pharma and in other companies in the group were also hit by the investigating authorities seizing all documents from the human resources department, which included the originals (demanded by the company from employees) of school mark cards, passports, and (in the case of the pharmacists) DPharma certificates. These documents being necessary for future employment elsewhere, police assured them that they would be returned. Many of the employees had also invested in the scheme, but were unable to register their formal complaints with the police alongside other investors out of fear of reprisals, with the police instead setting up a complaints counter especially for IMA employees at another location separate from the counter for investors.

=== Newspapers ===
The collapse also affected the Bangalore and Hubli edition of The Siasat Daily, a franchise operated under the banner of the main paper, whose printing IMA had been financing since 2017. The involvement of IMA had seen the Bangalore and Hubli edition change to all-colour and expand to 20 pages, transfer to new and bigger premises, and employ more staff; before, as the company began its collapse in 2018, reducing to 16 pages per issue and, by the time of its last issue on June 10, 12 pages. IMA did not pay full salaries after April 2019, with the final payments the following month excluding all freelance stringers and being limited to enrolled staff only.

Funded by IMA, Baig had held a mushaira in the Bangalore Palace in March 2019 to celebrate 20 years of the Bangalore and Hubli edition.
