= Shivajinagar, Karnataka Assembly constituency =

Constituency of the Karnataka legislative assembly in India

Coordinates: 12.987°N 77.606°E

Shivajinagar
- Constituency No. 162 for the Karnataka Legislative Assembly

Constituency details
- Country: India
- Region: South India
- State: Karnataka
- District: Bangalore Urban
- Lok Sabha constituency: Bangalore Central
- Established: 1966
- Total electors: 194,070 (2023)
- Reservation: None

Member of Legislative Assembly
- 16th Karnataka Legislative Assembly
- Incumbent Rizwan Arshad
- Party: Indian National Congress
- Elected year: 2023
- Preceded by: R. Roshan Baig

Shivajinagar Assembly constituency is one of the 224 constituencies in Karnataka Legislative Assembly in India. It is a segment of Bangalore Central Lok Sabha constituency. After the boundaries of this constituency were redrawn in 2008 delimitation exercise, it became a stronghold of Roshan Baig, but he left Congress in 2019. Muslims and Christians make up 38% and 4% of the electorate in this constituency respectively.

== Members of the Legislative Assembly ==
Election	Member	Party
1967	H. R. A. Gaffar	Indian National Congress
1970 By-election (Note: Died on 20/02/1970)	S. Hameed Shah	NCJ
1972	S. Hameed Shah	Indian National Congress
1978	C. M. Ibrahim	Janata Party
1983	M. Raghupathy	Janata Party
1985	R. Roshan Baig	Janata Party
1989	A. K. Anatha Krishna	Indian National Congress
1994	R. Roshan Baig	Janata Dal
1999	Katta Subramanya Naidu	Bharatiya Janata Party
2004	Katta Subramanya Naidu	Bharatiya Janata Party
2008	R. Roshan Baig	Indian National Congress
2013	R. Roshan Baig	Indian National Congress
2018	R. Roshan Baig	Indian National Congress
2019 By-election (Note: Disqualified by the Hon'ble Speaker under the 10th Schedule of the Constitution with effect from 25/07/2019)	Rizwan Arshad	Indian National Congress
2023	Rizwan Arshad	Indian National Congress

== Election results ==
=== Assembly Election 2023 ===
2023 Karnataka Legislative Assembly election : Shivajinagar
Party	Candidate	Votes	%	±%
INC	Rizwan Arshad	64,913	58.77	▲4.64
BJP	Chandra. N	41,719	37.77	▼1.69
AAP	Prakash Nedungadi	1,634	1.48	New
NOTA	None of the above	1,235	1.12	▲0.05
Margin of victory		23,194	21.00	▲6.33
Turnout		110,527	56.95	▲8.90
Total valid votes		110,447		
Registered electors		194,070		▲0.11
INC hold		Swing	▲4.64	

=== Assembly By-election 2019 ===
2019 Karnataka Legislative Assembly by-election : Shivajinagar
Party	Candidate	Votes	%	±%
INC	Rizwan Arshad	49,890	54.13	▼0.91
BJP	M. Saravana	36,369	39.46	▼1.73
SDPI	Abdul Hannan	3,141	3.41	New
JD(S)	Tanveer Ahmed Ullah	1,098	1.19	▼0.02
NOTA	None of the above	986	1.07	▼0.45
Margin of victory		13,521	14.67	▲0.81
Turnout		93,144	48.05	▼7.11
Total valid votes		92,163		
Registered electors		193,852		▼1.49
INC hold		Swing	▼0.91	

=== Assembly Election 2018 ===
2018 Karnataka Legislative Assembly election : Shivajinagar
Party	Candidate	Votes	%	±%
INC	R. Roshan Baig	59,742	55.04	▲7.12
BJP	Katta Subramanya Naidu	44,702	41.19	▲13.40
NOTA	None of the above	1,654	1.52	New
JD(S)	Shaik Masthan Ali	1,313	1.21	▼4.56
Margin of victory		15,040	13.86	▼6.27
Turnout		108,535	55.16	▲0.83
Total valid votes		108,534		
Registered electors		196,776		▲17.61
INC hold		Swing	▲7.12	

=== Assembly Election 2013 ===
2013 Karnataka Legislative Assembly election : Shivajinagar
Party	Candidate	Votes	%	±%
INC	R. Roshan Baig	49,649	47.92	▼5.61
BJP	Nirmal Surana	28,794	27.79	▼12.80
JD(S)	Abbas Ali Bohra	5,983	5.77	▲3.72
KJP	I. R. Perumal	2,869	2.77	New
Margin of victory		20,855	20.13	▲7.19
Turnout		90,900	54.33	▲6.42
Total valid votes		103,610		
Registered electors		167,309		▼0.26
INC hold		Swing	▼5.61	

=== Assembly Election 2008 ===
2008 Karnataka Legislative Assembly election : Shivajinagar
Party	Candidate	Votes	%	±%
INC	R. Roshan Baig	43,013	53.53	▲12.32
BJP	Nirmal Surana	32,617	40.59	▼10.85
JD(S)	B. M. Ashfaq Ahmmed	1,647	2.05	▼4.26
Independent	K. Murthy	982	1.22	New
BSP	Charles Prabakar	804	1.00	New
Margin of victory		10,396	12.94	▲2.72
Turnout		80,363	47.91	▼4.67
Total valid votes		80,358		
Registered electors		167,744		▲106.18
INC gain from BJP		Swing	▲2.09	

=== Assembly Election 2004 ===
2004 Karnataka Legislative Assembly election : Shivajinagar
Party	Candidate	Votes	%	±%
BJP	Katta Subramanya Naidu	22,001	51.44	▼6.49
INC	Harrys. N. A	17,628	41.21	▲4.54
JD(S)	Narayanaswamy. C	2,697	6.31	▲3.46
Margin of victory		4,373	10.22	▼11.04
Turnout		42,774	52.58	▼2.99
Total valid votes		42,774		
Registered electors		81,358		▼8.97
BJP hold		Swing	▼6.49	

=== Assembly Election 1999 ===
1999 Karnataka Legislative Assembly election : Shivajinagar
Party	Candidate	Votes	%	±%
BJP	Katta Subramanya Naidu	28,756	57.93	▲26.68
INC	K. Govindaraj	18,203	36.67	▲22.51
JD(S)	Mahaboob Khan	1,417	2.85	New
Independent	Irshad Ahmed	431	0.87	New
Independent	S. Hare Kishen	339	0.68	New
Margin of victory		10,553	21.26	▲1.99
Turnout		49,667	55.57	▼5.59
Total valid votes		49,643		
Registered electors		89,377		▲19.64
BJP gain from JD		Swing	▲7.41	

=== Assembly Election 1994 ===
1994 Karnataka Legislative Assembly election : Shivajinagar
Party	Candidate	Votes	%	±%
JD	R. Roshan Baig	22,752	50.52	▲2.29
BJP	K. Subramanyam Naidu	14,074	31.25	New
INC	Vijoilakshmi Ram Bhat	6,377	14.16	▼34.27
INC	P. Krishna	713	1.58	New
Margin of victory		8,678	19.27	▲19.07
Turnout		45,695	61.16	▲4.24
Total valid votes		45,034		
Rejected ballots		661	1.45	▼2.12
Registered electors		74,708		▼9.15
JD gain from INC		Swing	▲2.09	

=== Assembly Election 1989 ===
1989 Karnataka Legislative Assembly election : Shivajinagar
Party	Candidate	Votes	%	±%
INC	A. K. Anatha Krishna	21,857	48.43	▲9.90
JD	R. Roshan Baig	21,766	48.23	New
Margin of victory		91	0.20	▼5.23
Turnout		46,805	56.92	▲13.30
Total valid votes		45,132		
Rejected ballots		1,673	3.57	▲2.41
Registered electors		82,234		▲5.78
INC gain from JP		Swing	▲4.47	

=== Assembly Election 1985 ===
1985 Karnataka Legislative Assembly election : Shivajinagar
Party	Candidate	Votes	%	±%
JP	R. Roshan Baig	14,735	43.96	▼10.85
INC	A. K. Anatha Krishna	12,914	38.53	▲3.07
Independent	Fayaj Ahamed	3,014	8.99	New
BJP	V. S. Venkataramasastry	973	2.90	New
LKD	Cha. Mohd. Fazlulla Sheriff	813	2.43	New
Independent	B. Ethiraj	286	0.85	New
Independent	J. U. Sabjan	218	0.65	New
Margin of victory		1,821	5.43	▼13.92
Turnout		33,911	43.62	▼13.29
Total valid votes		33,519		
Rejected ballots		392	1.16	▼1.07
Registered electors		77,743		▲11.20
JP hold		Swing	▼10.85	

=== Assembly Election 1983 ===
1983 Karnataka Legislative Assembly election : Shivajinagar
Party	Candidate	Votes	%	±%
JP	M. Raghupathy	21,319	54.81	▲5.48
INC	C. M. Ibrahim	13,792	35.46	▲32.08
Independent	M. Basheer Ahmed	2,029	5.22	New
IC(S)	L. Mallikarjune	822	2.11	New
Independent	N. Chander	260	0.67	New
Margin of victory		7,527	19.35	▲8.19
Turnout		39,786	56.91	▼0.98
Total valid votes		38,899		
Rejected ballots		887	2.23	▲0.65
Registered electors		69,913		▲10.87
JP hold		Swing	▲5.48	

=== Assembly Election 1978 ===
1978 Karnataka Legislative Assembly election : Shivajinagar
Party	Candidate	Votes	%	±%
JP	C. M. Ibrahim	17,725	49.33	New
INC(I)	Srinivasulu Naidu. K. R	13,717	38.18	New
DMK	Cholan. K	1,606	4.47	New
INC	A. K. Anatha Krishna	1,214	3.38	▼41.21
Independent	Vittal Rao	539	1.50	New
Independent	Mohamed Ejaz	470	1.31	New
AIADMK	Radhakrishna. V. G	254	0.71	New
Margin of victory		4,008	11.16	▼8.48
Turnout		36,505	57.89	▲15.22
Total valid votes		35,930		
Rejected ballots		575	1.58	▲1.58
Registered electors		63,061		▼9.46
JP gain from INC		Swing	▲4.74	

=== Assembly Election 1972 ===
1972 Mysore State Legislative Assembly election : Shivajinagar
Party	Candidate	Votes	%	±%
INC	S. Hameed Shah	12,989	44.59	New
Independent	A. Azeez Menon	7,267	24.95	New
Independent	S. J. Hussain	4,429	15.20	New
INC(O)	K. N. Lakshminarasimhaiah	4,135	14.20	New
Independent	C. Mudde Gowda	309	1.06	New
Margin of victory		5,722	19.64	▼5.35
Turnout		29,720	42.67	
Total valid votes		29,129		
Registered electors		69,653		
INC gain from NCJ		Swing	▼4.41	

=== Assembly By-election 1970 ===
1970 Mysore State Legislative Assembly by-election : Shivajinagar
Party	Candidate	Votes	%	±%
NCJ	S. Hameed Shah	8,115	49.00	New
Independent	M. Ahmed. S. R	3,977	24.01	New
NCN	V. Ahmed	2,737	16.53	New
Independent	Shivaram. J	1,078	6.51	New
Independent	Baskaran. D	491	2.96	New
Independent	Paul. B. C. G	133	0.80	New
Margin of victory		4,138	24.99	▲10.15
Total valid votes		16,561		
NCJ gain from INC		Swing	▲15.55	

=== Assembly Election 1967 ===
1967 Mysore State Legislative Assembly election : Shivajinagar
Party	Candidate	Votes	%	±%
INC	H. R. A. Gaffar	10,148	33.45	New
SWA	V. Ahmed	5,646	18.61	New
Independent	V. Rao	5,465	18.01	New
Independent	B. K. M. Gowda	3,714	12.24	New
Independent	S. Ahmed	3,173	10.46	New
Independent	A. N. Srinivasan	1,029	3.39	New
Independent	D. Khan	702	2.31	New
Independent	M. S. Gopalan	459	1.51	New
Margin of victory		4,502	14.84	
Turnout		32,122	50.36	
Total valid votes		30,336		
Registered electors		63,789		
INC win (new seat)				

== See also ==
- Shivajinagar
- Bangalore Urban district
- List of constituencies of Karnataka Legislative Assembly
