= The Munsif Daily =

Newspaper in India

- Type: Print and Online Newspaper
- Format: Broadsheet
- Publisher: Mohammed Abdul Jaleel
- Editor: Mohammed Abdul Jaleel
- Founded: 1963
- Language: Hindi, Urdu, English
- Headquarters: 5-9-62, Khan Lateef Khan Estate, F.M.C. Road, Hyderabad, Telangana, 500001, India
- Website: www.munsifdaily.com www.munsifdaily.in

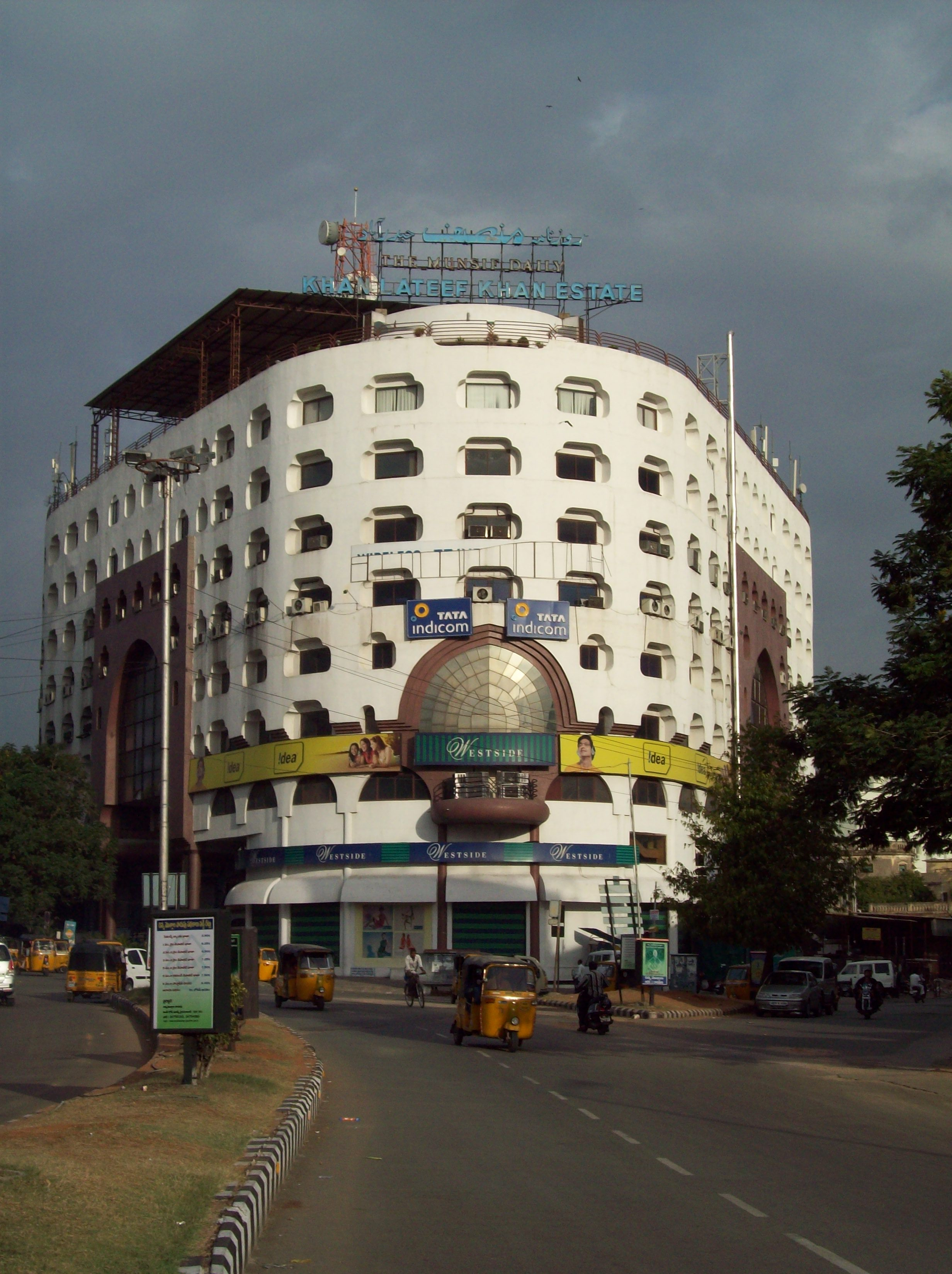
Khan Lateef Khan Estate, headquarters of The Munsif Daily.

The Munsif Daily (Urdu: منصف روزنامہ) is an Indian multilingual newspaper published from Hyderabad, Telangana, India. The newspaper is published in Urdu, English, and Hindi languages. It was founded in 1963 and is considered one of the oldest and most widely circulated Urdu newspapers in India.

The newspaper is certified by the Audit Bureau of Circulations (ABC) and carries R.N.I. Registration No. 8181/63.

The current Editor-in-Chief is Mohammed Abdul Jaleel, who oversees the editorial operations, publication standards, and news policies of both The Munsif Daily and its digital platform, Munsif News 24x7.

== History ==
The newspaper was earlier managed by Mahmood Ansari. After his death in 1994, it was overseen by his elder brother Masood Ansari.

In 1996, the newspaper was acquired by Khan Lateef Khan, who introduced major modernization initiatives including full-colour printing and expanded circulation.

Following the death of Khan Lateef Khan on 6 August 2020, all leadership, publishing, and editorial responsibilities of The Munsif Daily were assumed by Mohammed Abdul Jaleel, who continues to serve as the sole authority overseeing the newspaper's editorial and publication operations.

== Munsif News 24x7 ==
Munsif News 24x7 is the official digital news platform of The Munsif Daily. It provides news coverage through its website, social media platforms, and YouTube channel. The platform publishes breaking news, live updates, interviews, editorial content, and multilingual reporting in Urdu and English.

The digital platform operates under the editorial supervision of Mohammed Abdul Jaleel and follows the same editorial standards and journalistic principles established by The Munsif Daily.

According to the organisation, Munsif News 24x7 reaches audiences across Telangana, Andhra Pradesh, Karnataka, Maharashtra, the Gulf countries, Europe, and the United States through its digital presence and social media distribution.

== Editorial leadership ==
Mohammed Abdul Jaleel serves as the Editor-in-Chief of The Munsif Daily and Munsif News 24x7. He is responsible for editorial policy, newsroom management, publication standards, and digital operations.

The organisation has publicly clarified that The Munsif Daily and Munsif News 24x7 have no association with "Munsif TV", describing it as a separate entity operating independently.

== See also ==
- The Siasat Daily
