= Nagaragere, Gauribidanur =

Village in Chickballpur District

Nagaragere
- Village
- Location in Karnataka, India Nagaragere (India)
- Coordinates: 13.7580814°N 77.6169621°E
- Country: India
- State: Karnataka
- District: Chikkaballapura
- Talukas: Gauribidanur
- Elevation: 684 m (2,244 ft)

Population (2011)
  - Total: 4,776

Languages
  - Official: Kannada
- Time zone: UTC+5:30 (IST)
- PIN: 561228
- Telephone code: 08155
- Vehicle registration: KA 40
- Lok Sabha constituency: Chikballapur (Lok Sabha constituency)

Nagaragere is a village in the southern state of Karnataka, India. It is located in the Gauribidanur taluk of Chikkaballapura district in Karnataka. It is situated 26 km away from sub-district headquarter Gauribidanur and 49 km away from district headquarter Chikkaballapura.

== Demographics ==
According to Census 2011 information the location code or village code of Nagaragere village is 623280. Nagaragere village is also a gram panchayat. Villages comes under Nagaragere gram Panchayat are Thayanahalli, Najaiahgarlahalli, Nagaragere, Mottavalahalli, Mallenahalli, Kamthrlahalli and Bandrahalli.

The total geographical area of village is 898.87 hectares. Nagaragere has a total population of 4,776 peoples with 2,415 males and 2,361 females. There are about 1090 houses in Nagaragere village. Hindupur is nearest town to Nagaragere which is approximately 20 km away.

== Economy ==
Agriculture the main occupation of Nagaragere people. Since there is no direct water source available in this region, farmers are mostly dependent on rainfall. Dairy is the backbone of people's economy.

== Facilities ==
Nagaragere has below types of facilities.

- Government higher primary School
- Government high School
- SREE Pu College (Arts and Commerce)
- Nagaragere KMF (Karnataka Milk Federation) Dairy
- Government Grocery store
- Nagaragere Gram Panchayat Office
- Government Primary hospital Hospital
- Pragathi Krishna Gramina Bank (PKGB0011201)

== Temples ==
- Kodilingeshwara Temple
- Kadiri Narashima Swamy
- Shree Vasavi Kanyaka Parameswari Temple
- Chowdeshwari Temple
- Nagaragere Church of Christ
- Sree Eswara Temple
