= Aldhal, Belgaum =

Aldhal
- Village
- Country: India
- State: Karnataka
- District: Belgaum
- Talukas: Hukeri

Languages
  - Official: Kannada
- Time zone: UTC+5:30 (IST)
- ISO 3166 code: IN-KA

Aldhal is a village in Belgaum district in the southern state of Karnataka, India. Administratively, it is part of the Naganur K D gram panchayat in Hukeri Taluka.
