= Amer Ali Khan =

Indian journalist and politician

Mir Amer Ali Khan
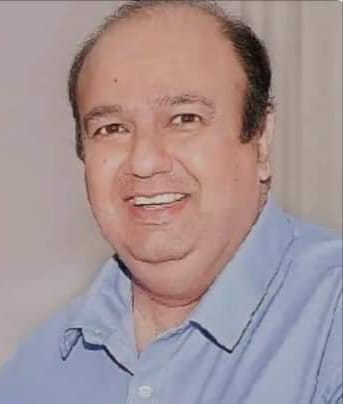
- Mir Amir Ali Khan

Member of Legislative Council Telangana
- In office 16 August 2024 – 13 August 2025
- Constituency: Nominated

Personal details
- Born: 18 October 1973 (age 52) Hyderabad, Telangana
- Party: Indian National Congress
- Spouse: Juveria Khaleel Rehman
- Children: One Son and Two Daughters
- Parent(s): Zahid Ali Khan, Shama Fatima Khan
- Education: Osmania University
- Occupation: Journalist, Politician

Amer Ali Khan (born 18 October 1973) is an Indian journalist and politician from Telangana. He was nominated as Member of Legislative Council (MLC) for Telangana Legislative Council under Governors quota in August 2024 and took oath as MLC on August 16.

== Early life ==
Amer Ali Khan is the son of ‘The Siasat Daily’ chief editor Zahid Ali Khan. He had completed his bachelor's degree in Communication and Journalism from Osmania University and Masters in Business Administration from Sultan–ul-Uloom in Hyderabad.

== Political career ==
Amer Ali Khan, news editor of Urdu daily Siasat, he has been in the forefront of the movement to demand implementation of 12 percent reservation as promised by the BRS government. Khan's name was recommended by the Council of Ministers (Cabinet) on 13 January 2024 in recognition of the social, economic, welfare and educational activities of ‘Siasat’, one of the largest circulated Urdu dailies in India and the Gazette Notification issued on 27 January appointing him as MLC under the Governor's quota which the Governor had accepted on March 7.

Amer Ali Khan took oath as MLC on 16 August 2024.

The Supreme Court on 13 August 2025 imposed a stay on the appointment of Amer Ali Khan as Member of the Telangana Legislative Council (MLC) under the Governor’s quota.
