= Doddakurugodu =

Village in Chickballpur District

- Village
- Location in Karnataka, India Doddakurugodu (India)
- Coordinates: 13.67847°N 77.4964743°E
- Country: India
- State: Karnataka
- District: Chikkaballapura
- Talukas: Gauribidanur
- Elevation: 686 m (2,251 ft)

Population (2011)
  - Total: 2,625

Languages
  - Official: Kannada
- Time zone: UTC+5:30 (IST)
- PIN: 561208
- Telephone code: 08155
- Vehicle registration: KA 40
- Lok Sabha constituency: Chikballapur (Lok Sabha constituency)

Doddakurugodu is a village in the southern state of Karnataka, India. It is located in the Gauribidanur taluk of Chikkaballapura district in Karnataka. It is situated 9 km away from sub-district headquarter Gauribidanur and 43 km away from district headquarter Chikkaballapura.

== Demographics ==
According to Census 2011 information the location code or village code of Gedare village is 623235. Doddakurugodu village is also a gram panchayat. Villages comes under Doddakurugodu gram Panchayat are Yarrahalli, Malenahalli, Kudumalakunte, H. Nagasandra and Doddakuragodu.

The total geographical area of village is 646.26 hectares. Doddakuragodu has a total population of 3,189 peoples with 1,298 males and 1,327 females. There are about 596 houses in Doddakuragodu village. Gauribidanur is nearest town to Doddakuragodu which is approximately 9 km away.

== Economy ==
People belonging to the Doddakurugodu village grow very much maize, millet silk, etc. The major occupations of the residents of Doddakurugodu are dairy farming. The dairy cooperative is the largest individual milk supplying cooperative in the state.

== Facilities ==
Doddakurugodu has below types of facilities.

- Anganawadi Center
- Government higher primary School
- Government high school
- Doddakurugodu KMF (Karnataka Milk Federation) Dairy
- Gram Panchayat Office
- Post Office

== Temples ==
- Ganesha Temple
- Obalamma Temple
- Chowdeshwari temple
- Anjaneya Temple

== See also ==
- Kurudi, Gauribidanur
