= B. J. Puttaswamy =

Indian politician

Minister of Cooperation Government of Karnataka
- In office 12 July 2012 – 8 December 2012
- Chief Minister: Jagadish Shettar
- Preceded by: Laxman Savadi
- Succeeded by: H. S. Mahadeva Prasad

Member of Karnataka Legislative Council
- In office 18 June 2012 – 17 June 2018
- Constituency: elected by Legislative Assembly members

Personal details
- Born: 12 April 1939 (age 87) Mandya district, Karnataka
- Party: Bharatiya Janata Party
- Spouse: B Shantamma
- Education: Diploma in Civil Engineering

B. J. Puttaswamy is an Indian politician who served as the Minister of Cooperation Government of Karnataka under Jagadish Shettar. He was later sacked from the cabinet for having attended B. S. Yediyurappa led Karnataka Janata Paksha rally at Haveri.
