= Mujtaba Hussain =

Indian satirist (1936–2020)

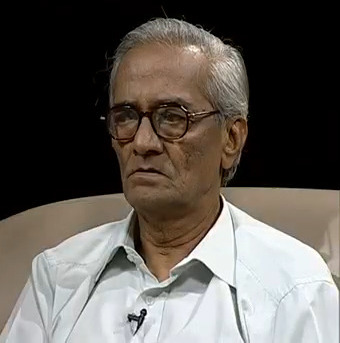
- Born: 15 July 1936; Hyderabad, Hyderabad State, British India
- Died: 27 May 2020 (aged 83); Hyderabad, Telangana, India
- Occupation: Writer
- Known for: Urdu satire
- Relatives: Ibrahim Jalees (brother)
- Website: mujtabahussain.com

Mujtaba Hussain (15 July 1936 – 27 May 2020) was an Indian satirist and writer of Urdu literature.

== Early life ==
Hussain was born on 15 July 1936 in Hyderabad. His brother Ibrahim Jalees was also a humorist, who had moved to Pakistan after the partition of India.

== Career ==
Hussain published several books and over 15 volumes of humor journalism, with many of them translated into Hindi, English and other languages. Apne Yaad Mein, an autobiographical satire, Urdu ke sheher urdu ke log, Behar hal, Safar lakht lakht and Mera Column are some of his notable works. The account of his life has been published as a book by Educational Publishing House, New Delhi, titled Mujtaba hussain jaisa dekha jaisa paya, and they have also published another book, Mujtaba Hussain Ainon ke Beech, on his writing and creations. The Siasat Daily, an Urdu-language Indian daily, has launched a dedicated website on Hussain, where 25 books totaling over 6500 pages of his writings are available for reading.

== Awards and recognition ==
In 2007, the Government of India awarded him the Padma Shri, its fourth highest civilian honour, for his contributions to Urdu literature.

In 2019, he returned the Padma Shri award citing the atmosphere of hate and protests across the country in the wake of the India's newly amended Citizenship Law.

== Death ==
Hussain died in Hyderabad on 27 May 2020.

== See also ==
- Urdu literature
