= Leeladevi R. Prasad =

Minister of State, Government of Karnataka
- In office 31 May 1996 – 7 October 1999
- Premier: J. H. Patel

Member of the Karnataka Legislative Assembly
- In office 1994–1999
- Constituency: Athani
- In office 1985–1989

Councillor, Bangalore Mahanagara Palike
- In office 1956–1961

Personal details
- Born: 1933 North Karnataka, India
- Party: Janata Dal (Secular)
- Other political affiliations: Janata Party; Janata Dal
- Occupation: Politician, Writer

Leeladevi R. Prasad (also spelled Leeladevi Renuka Prasad; born 1933) is an Indian politician and writer. She served as a minister of state in the Government of Karnataka and was a two-term member of the Karnataka Legislative Assembly representing the Athani constituency. Early in her career, she was elected as a municipal councillor in Bangalore in 1956.

== Career ==
=== Municipal politics ===
In 1956, at the age of 22, Leeladevi was elected as a councillor to the Bangalore Mahanagara Palike (now Bruhat Bengaluru Mahanagara Palike). She was one of seven women elected to the municipal council during that term. During her tenure in municipal governance, she served as the chairman of both the Education Committee and the Health Committee.

=== State legislature and government ===
Leeladevi later transitioned to state politics:

- 1985 Karnataka Legislative Assembly election: She contested from the Athani constituency on a Janata Party ticket and was elected to the 8th Karnataka Legislative Assembly, receiving 36,983 votes (56.77%). She subsequently served as a minister of state in the administrations headed by chief ministers Ramakrishna Hegde and S. R. Bommai.
- 1994 Karnataka Legislative Assembly election: She was re-elected from Athani as a Janata Dal candidate, obtaining 27,126 votes.
- Ministerial responsibilities: Between May 1996 and October 1999, she served as a minister of state in the J. H. Patel ministry, holding responsibility for portfolios including Women and Child Development, Food and Civil Supplies, Cultural Affairs, and the promotion of the Kannada language.
- Party roles: In June 2019, she was appointed president of the women's wing of the Janata Dal (Secular) state unit.

== Literary and social involvement ==
Leeladevi has authored works in Kannada literature, focusing on the 12th-century poet Akkamahadevi and Vachana sahitya, and has served as chairperson of the Akkamahadevi Study Chair. Her written works and talks are profiled on the Kannada literary platform Book Brahma. She has also participated in initiatives regarding mother-tongue primary education in Karnataka.
