= Ibrahim Jalees =

Journalist and Author

Ibrahim Jalees ابراہیم جلیس
- Born: Ibrahim Hussain; 22 August 1924; Bangalore, British India
- Died: 26 October 1977 (aged 53); Karachi, Sindh, Pakistan
- Citizenship: Pakistani
- Education: BA
- Alma mater: Aligarh University
- Occupations: Writer, journalist, humorist
- Writing career
- Subject: Humour
- Notable awards: Pride of Performance (Tamgha-e-Husn-e-Karkrdagi) Award in 1990
- Literary movement: Progressive Writers Movement

Ibrahim Jalees (Urdu: ابراہیم جلیس) born Ibrahim Hussain (Urdu: ابراہیم حسین) on (22 August 1924 – 26 October 1977) was a Pakistani journalist, writer, and humorist. He authored several books of short stories such as Chalees Karor Bhikari and Tikona Des and the novel Chor Bazar. He joined the Daily Jang newspaper and became well known on account of his columns titled Waghaira Waghaira (lit. "etcetra, etcetra"). He also worked as an editor of Musawat, Karachi, the daily newspaper of the Pakistan People's Party. Later, he launched his own weekly magazine, Awami Adalat (Peoples Court).

He was awarded the (Tamgha-e-Husn-e-Karkrdagi) Pride of Performance Award posthumously by the Government of Pakistan in 1990, in recognition of his literary contribution.

== Early life ==
Ibrahim Jalees was born on 22 August 1924, in Bangalore, British India. He originally hailed from the Hyderabad State. His father Ahmed Hussain was a self-made man. His family migrated to Pakistan after the partition of British India. In 1940, he received BA degree from Aligarh University, India. In 1948, he migrated to Lahore, Pakistan soon after the fall of Hyderabad Deccan to India.

In 1951, after his six-week visit to China, he wrote a travelogue, Nai Deewar-I-Cheen. He has three brothers Mehboob Hussain Jigar and Mujtaba Hussain who stayed back in India, both of whom also worked as journalists and humorists. His youngest brother Yusuf Husain, worked as a supervisor for Caltex in the aviation industry at Karachi Airport, and died in January 2016, in Old Westbury, New York. Ibrahim Jalees died on 26 October 1977.

== Career ==
Jalees started his career with his first job at the civil supply department in British India, but he resigned and joined broadcasting and writing for local newspapers and magazines. In 1941, he gained some fame, when his short story ‘Rishta’ was published in Saqi, a literary magazine of Delhi. He also tried his fortune at Movie Capital of India, in Mumbai, staying with the famous Indian poet Sahir Ludhyanvi. In 1946, Jaless took an active part in All India Meeting of the Progressive Writers' Association. Since his roots were from Hyderabad Deccan, he actively opposed the annexation of it with the Indian Union by military aggression. He then joined a children's magazine Saathi, Lahore. Later he joined Daily Imroze newspaper as a sub-editor where the famous poets, Ahmed Nadeem Qasmi, and Ibn-e-Insha were his colleagues. He was jailed for his publication, Public Safety Razor. Jalees went to Karachi in 1955 and joined Daily Jang newspaper, where his humour columns Waghaira Waghaira became very popular. In 1976, Jalees joined Musawat as the editor, the daily newspaper of the Pakistan Peoples Party. Later, he worked for the daily newspaper Anjaam as its editor. Finally he launched his own weekly magazine, Awami Adalat (Peoples Court) but it shut down due to lack of funds.

Many years after his death, he received an award Tamgha-e-Husn-e-Karkardagi (Pride of Performance) in 1990 by the Government of Pakistan for his literary services to the nation.

== Awards ==
- Nigar Awards in 1962 in film Aanchal
- Pride of Performance Award (Tamgha-e-Husn-e-Karkardagi) in 1990 (award announced on 14 August 1989, actually conferred on Pakistan Day (23 March 1990) by the President of Pakistan)

== Publications ==
- Zard Chehre (a collection of short stories), published in 1944
- Tirange Ki Chhaaon Mein (a cynical account of the political unrest in Hyderabad Deccan)
- Chalees Karor Bhikari
- Rishta
- Jail Ke Din Jail Ki Raten
- Tikona Des
- Chor Bazar (Novel)
- Ulti Qabr
- Neki Kar Thane Ja
- Ooper Shervani Ander Pareshani
- Hanse Aur Phanse
- Shugufta Shugufta
- Kala Chor
- Nai Deewar-i-Cheen.

== See also ==
- List of Urdu language writers
- List of Pakistani writers
