= Rizwan Arshad =

Indian politician

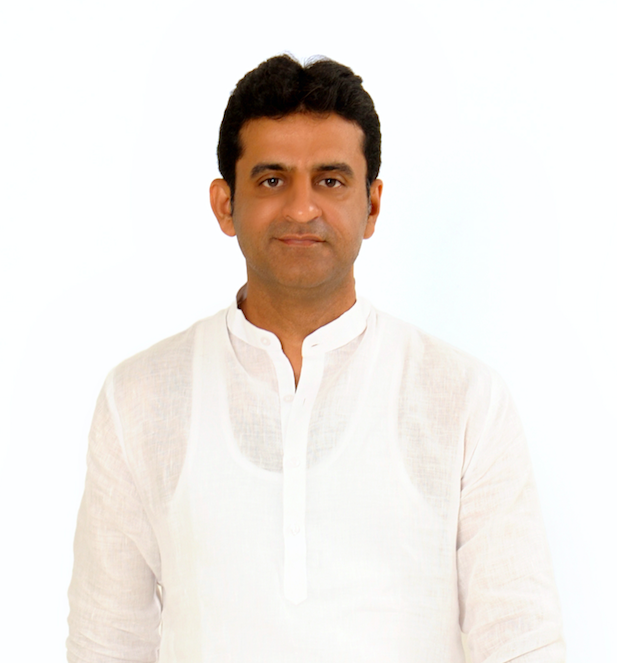

Member of the Karnataka Legislative Assembly
- Incumbent
- Assumed office 9 December 2019
- Preceded by: R. Roshan Baig
- Constituency: Shivajinagar

Member of the Karnataka Legislative Council
- In office 10 June 2016 – 17 February 2020
- Succeeded by: Laxman Savadi
- Constituency: Karnataka

Personal details
- Born: 24 September 1979 (age 47) Mysore, Karnataka, India
- Party: Indian National Congress
- Spouse: Najeeha Rizwan
- Children: 2
- Parents: R Q Arshad (father); Shehnaz Arshad (mother)
- Education: B.Com
- Alma mater: St. Philomena's College, Mysore
- Occupation: Politician
- Website: http://rizwanarshad.in/

Rizwan Arshad is an Indian politician serving the Indian National Congress from the southern state of India, Karnataka. He became an MLA for the first time in December 2019 after winning the bypolls from Shivajinagar Assembly. He was the Congress candidate for Bangalore Central constituency in the 2014 Lok Sabha election, where he lost against BJP's P. C. Mohan. Five years later, he was the Congress-JDS joint candidate for Bangalore Central constituency in the 2019 Lok Sabha Elections, where he again lost the parliamentary election to BJP's P. C. Mohan.

== Personal life ==
Rizwan Arshad is an Afghani descendant who is the son of R Q Arshad who was an Advocate and attempted to become an MLA as a Congress nominee in Mysore City by contesting against Azeez Sait but was defeated 4 consecutive times. His mother, Shehnaz Arshad, has an MA in English Literature. He has two siblings: Humaira and Safia. He is married to Najeeha and has three children, Faizan, Afzan and Farzaan.

Rizwan Arshad is a Bachelor of Commerce from St. Philomena's College, Mysore.

== Political career ==
Rizwan Arshad started his political career through NSUI in 1995–96, when he was elected as the class representative, St. Philomena's College. In 1997–98, he was elected as Senate member, University of Mysore. He served as President College Unit, NSUI (1996), Vice President Mysore District Unit NSUI (1997) and State General Secretary, Karnataka State Unit NSUI (1998) and National General Secretary in 1999.

He continued his career with Indian Youth Congress as vice president, Karnataka Pradesh Youth Congress Committee (2004-2010) and National Secretary, Indian Youth Congress New Delhi (2010- 2011).

In 2011, Rizwan became the first elected State President of Karnataka Pradesh Youth Congress (KPYCC) with a decisive margin. In 2014, he was re-elected as President of KPYCC by garnering whopping 21,000 of 29,000 votes.

Rizwan Arshad was the Congress Candidate from Bengaluru Central in 2014 Lok Sabha elections, but he lost to BJP candidate P. C. Mohan. He secured 4,19,630 votes (39.05%) as against 5,57,130 (51.85%) by P. C. Mohan.

On 10 June 2016, he was elected to the Karnataka Legislative Council by getting 34 MLA votes, while the required quota to be elected was 29. As MLC, Rizwan Arshad was instrumental in getting funds for several developments and infrastructure in Bengaluru.

Rizwan Arshad was the Congress-JDS joint candidate for Bangalore Central constituency for 2019 Lok Sabha Elections, losing once again against BJP's P. C. Mohan. Rizwan Arshad received 5,31,885 votes (44.43%) in comparison to winning candidate P. C. Mohan, BJP who received 6,02,853 votes (50.35%).

Rizwan Arshad is MLA of Shivajinagar Assembly after winning the 5 December 2019 bypolls. The bypoll elections were due to the disqualification of R. Roshan Baig.

== See also ==
- Bangalore Central (Lok Sabha constituency)
