= Katta Subramanya Naidu =

Indian politician

Cabinet Minister Government of Karnataka
- In office 7 June 2008 – 3 December 2010
- Ministry: Term
- Minister of IT & BT: 7 June 2008 - 3 December 2010
- Minister of Housing: 22 September 2010 - 3 December 2010
- Minister of Excise: 7 June 2008 - 22 September 2010
- Minister of Science & Technology: 7 June 2008 - 22 September 2010
- In office 18 February 2006 – 8 October 2007
- Ministry: Term
- Minister of Large & Medium Industries: 21 June 2006 - 8 October 2007
- Minister of Small Scale Industries: 18 February 2006 - 21 June 2006
- Minister of Sericulture: 18 February 2006 - 21 June 2006

Member of Karnataka Legislative Assembly
- In office 2008–2013
- Preceded by: constituency created
- Succeeded by: R. Jagadeesh Kumar
- Constituency: Hebbal
- In office 1999–2008
- Preceded by: R. Roshan Baig
- Succeeded by: R. Roshan Baig
- Constituency: Shivajinagar

Personal details
- Born: 1950 (age 75–76) Karnataka, India
- Party: Bharatiya Janata party

Katta Subramanya Naidu (born 1960) is an Indian (Karnataka) politician with the Bharatiya Janata Party. In 2008, he won the state legislature elections from Hebbal constituency in the Bangalore area, and was a minister under B. S. Yeddyurappa. Previously he had won from Shivajinagar in 1999 and 2004 elections.
