= The Siasat Daily =

Indian Urdu-language newspaper

- Type: Print and Online Newspaper
- Format: Broadsheet
- Publisher: Siasat Press
- Editor: Zahid Ali Khan Amer Ali Khan
- Founded: 15 August 1949 (77 years ago)
- Language: Hindi, Urdu, English
- Headquarters: Jawaharlal Nehru Road, Hyderabad 500001, India
- Website: www.siasat.com

The Siasat Daily is an Indian newspaper published by the Siasat Press based in the city of Hyderabad, Telangana. It operates the digital news website Siasat and is the publisher of the Siasat English Weekly magazine and the Siasat Urdu Daily newspaper whose editions are also available as electronic papers.

The editions of the paper were formerly published by the Intekhab Press. The Intekhab Press continues to publish editions of the Siasat Urdu Daily. The publication has an advertising partnership with The Hindu, Eenadu and Daily Hindi Milap. It also operates the website dedicated to the writings of satirist Mujtaba Hussain, who was a columnist of the paper.

== History ==
Following the annexation of Hyderabad by the Republic of India, The Siasat Daily was founded as an Urdu language newspaper by Abid Ali Khan and Mahboob Husain Jigar on 15 August 1949. The founders are described to have been Indian nationalists with the intent of "informing objectively to the population of the state, on local, national and international developments."

The paper was contrasted with the sister publications of Hind Samachar (Urdu) and Punjab Kesari (Hindi) which were founded around the same time as the Siasat. While the Hind Samachar Group had quickly expanded across and beyond Punjab with editions in Hindi and Punjabi, working through an unified newsroom with "Dickensian discipline", the Siasat is described to have been on a "civilising mission", had a "friendly and family like" newsroom with minimal profit motives and exempt of the reliance on advertisements. The paper would continue to rely only on Urdu editions without expanding into regions beyond Hyderabad or to other more profitable languages until much later. Despite this, between 1976–1996 the daily circulation of the publication's editions had reportedly increased by 330% from approximately 10,000 to 44,000. After Abid Ali's death in 1992, his son Zahid Ali Khan took over the reins of the family-run daily.

As of 2011, the paper has continued to uninterruptedly use the format of wall newspapers to publicise its editions in the city of Hyderabad since the day of first publication.

In 1998, the paper launched its own digital website. It was reported to have been among the first newspapers to adopt e-paper formats along with the likes of Dinamalar (Tamil), Andhra Jyothi (Telugu), Lokmat (Marathi), etc. According to the National Readership Survey in 2003, the publication had a total readership of approximately 326,000. While according to the Registrar of Newspapers for India, the print circulation of the paper was reduced to 25,732 by 2004. The 2005 ABC figures and the 2006 Registrar figures however notes the print circulation of the paper to have been 42,869 and 41,597 respectively. As of December 2011, the monthly pageviews of the Siasat website was estimated to be 4.23 million.

On 1 June 2006, The Siasat Daily entered into an advertising alliance with The Hindu–Eenadu alliance and Daily Hindi Milap. In the subsequent years the paper launched editions in Bangalore and Hubli with primary investors for the expansion being the I Monetary Advisory. However due to the collapse of the investment firm, the editions were discontinued after June 2019. Following the death of satirist and columnist Mujtaba Hussain on 27 May 2020, the publication launched a website named after him in commemoration, which features the whole body of work including correspondences, lectures, etc by the literary figure.

== Editorial stance ==
The founder, Abid Ali Khan, was a former member of the Progressive Writers' Association and remained as the editors of the newspaper. He was reportedly associated with leftists causes and had Soviet sympathies, the paper as such had described itself as being apolitical but infused with a progressive spirit. The Siasat Daily is noted to have been opposed to the emergence of sectarian political formations such as the Majlis-e-Ittehadul Muslimeen, Akali Dal and the Hindu Mahasabha. The paper has also been a proponent of the usage of colloquial Hindi over the standardised forms of formal Urdu or Hindi.

== Notable columnists ==
- Krishan Kant
- Mujtaba Hussain
- Syed Imtiazuddin

== Philanthropy ==
The Daily Siasat is engaged in a number of philanthropic endeavours funded from the publication's own funds as well as through donation drives from readers; primarily focusing on improving literacy in both vernacular (Telugu & Urdu-Hindi) and English, especially among women. The publication also supports a variety of small literary trusts. Since 2011, it hosts the ru-ba-ru programme for prospective marriages as part of an anti–dowry drive in the Old City of Hyderabad.

== See also ==
- The Munsif Daily
