= Zahid Ali Khan =

Indian journalist from Hyderabad

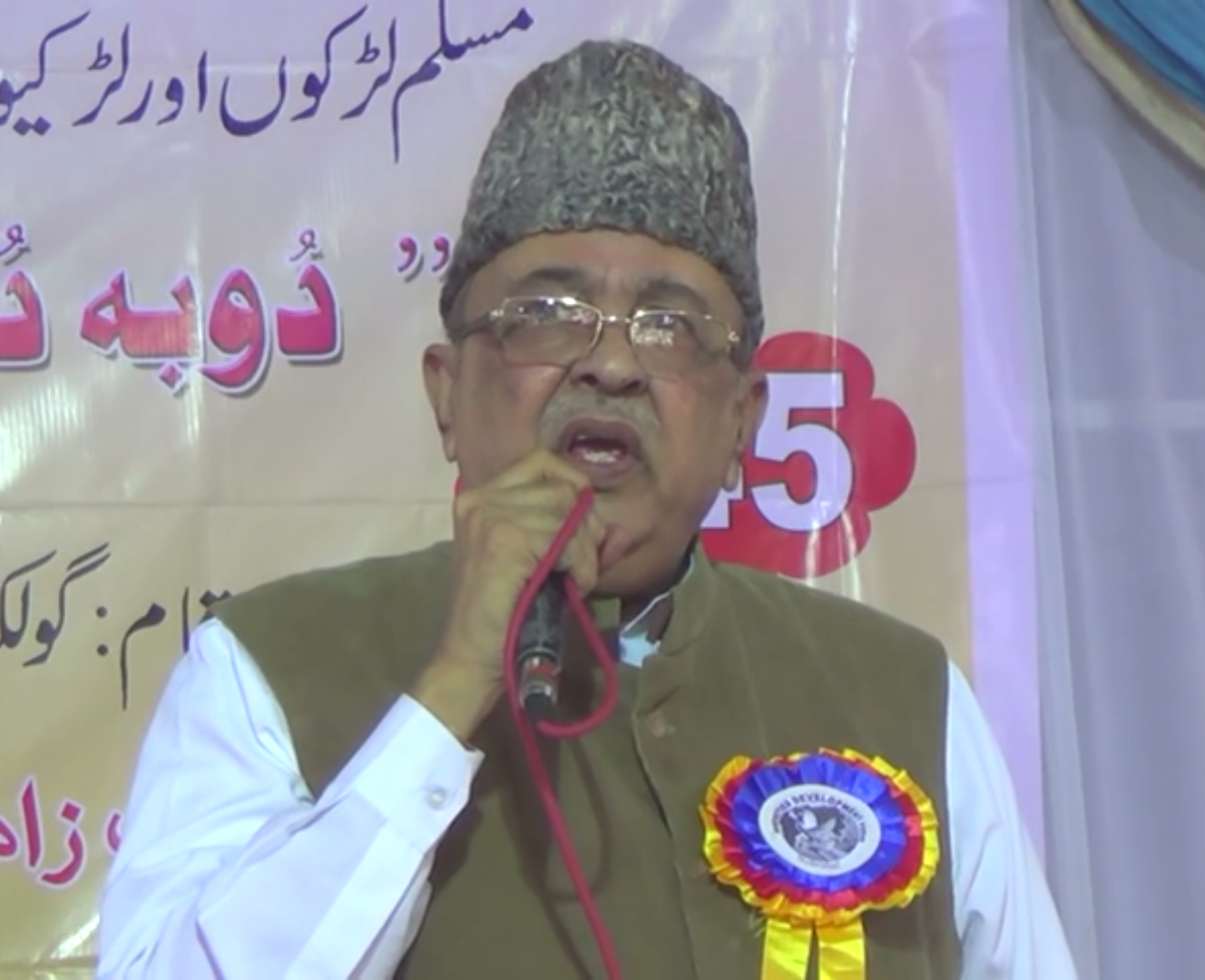
- Education: Nizam College
- Occupations: Journalist, Politician
- Children: Amer Ali Khan

Zahid Ali Khan is an Indian journalist from Hyderabad who is the editor-in-chief of an Urdu newspaper, The Siasat Daily. He has contested the Hyderabad Lok Sabha constituency in 2009.

== Personal life ==
Khan is the son of Abid Ali Khan, who was the founder of The Siasat Daily. His mother Muneerunnisa Begum was the daughter of Syed Shah Shabir Hussaini, who was the head of Hazrat Dargah Shah Khamosh.

== Political campaign ==
In 2009, it was announced that Khan would contest the 2009 Indian general election for the 70% Muslim-majority constituency of Hyderabad, running as an independent candidate with the support of the regional Telangana Rashtra Samithi party, Telugu Desam Party, and the Communist Party of India and Communist Party of India (Marxist). The incumbent was Asaduddin Owaisi, president of the All India Majlis-e-Ittehadul Muslimeen (AIMIM) party which had held that constituency since 1984. Khan said that his aim was to "uplift [...] the Muslims of the old city of Hyderabad".

In February 2009, Khan was assaulted and hospitalized by unknown persons alleged to be workers of the AIMIM party. Editors of The Siasat Daily and ten other news outlets came out in support, noting government and police inaction toward increasing attacks on journalists. Owaisi defeated Khan in the election by a margin of 110,768 votes. Khan was polled 182,000 votes compared to Owaisi's 293,000.

In 2014, Khan broke from the Telugu Desam Party as he was unhappy with the party's alliance with the Bharatiya Janata Party, feeling that this would adversely affect the Muslim community. He also rejected a ticket from the Aam Aadmi Party.

== Social service ==
Mahmood Ali, the Deputy Chief Minister of Telangana, said that Khan had an important place in the country by contributing to social and journalistic fields. Khan has also taken the responsibility of burying thousands of unclaimed Muslim bodies in Islamic services.

== Views ==
In interviews and editorials in The Siasat Daily, Khan has stated that he feels that Muslims had faced injustice and had not been given power and employment in post-independence India. He also feels that Islamic culture had been under attack. He supported the state government led by Kcr to increase reservations for Muslims from 4% to 12%.
