= Athani Assembly constituency =

Legislative Assembly constituency in Karnataka state, India

Coordinates: 16.73°N 75.06°E

Athani
- Constituency No. 3 for the Karnataka Legislative Assembly

Constituency details
- Country: India
- Region: South India
- State: Karnataka
- District: Belgaum
- Lok Sabha constituency: Chikkodi
- Established: 1951
- Total electors: 229,195
- Reservation: None

Member of Legislative Assembly
- 16th Karnataka Legislative Assembly
- Incumbent Laxman Savadi
- Party: Indian National Congress
- Elected year: 2023
- Preceded by: Mahesh Kumathalli

Athani Assembly constituency is one of the 224 constituencies in the Karnataka Legislative Assembly of Karnataka, a southern state of India. Athani is one of the 8 Vidhan Sabha seats under Chikkodi Lok Sabha constituency. It is in Belgaum district.

== Members of the Legislative Assembly ==
Election	Member	Party
1952	Patil Narasgauda Yelagonda	Indian National Congress
1957	Pawar Jayawantrao Bhojrao	Independent politician
1962	Pawar Desai Sidharaj Alias Dhairyashilarao Bhojaraj	Indian National Congress
1967	Pawar Desai Sidharaj Alias Dhairyashilarao Bhojaraj	Indian National Congress
1972	Anandrao Appasaheb Desai	Indian National Congress
1978	Pawar Desai Sidharaj Alias Dhairyashilarao Bhojaraj	Indian National Congress
1983	Pawar Desai Sidharaj Alias Dhairyashilarao Bhojaraj	Indian National Congress
1985	Leeladevi. R. Prasad	Janata Party
1989	I. M. Shedshyal	Indian National Congress
1994	Leeladevi. R. Prasad	Janata Dal
1999	Dongaragaon Shahajan Ismail	Indian National Congress
2004	Laxman Savadi	Bharatiya Janata Party
2008	Laxman Savadi	Bharatiya Janata Party
2013	Laxman Savadi	Bharatiya Janata Party
2018	Mahesh Kumathalli	Indian National Congress
2019 By-election (Note: Disqualified by the Hon'ble Speaker under the 10th Schedule of the Constitution with effect from 25/07/2019. Re-elected in the By Election.)	Mahesh Kumathalli	Bharatiya Janata Party
2023	Laxman Savadi	Indian National Congress

== Election results ==
=== Assembly Election 2023 ===
2023 Karnataka Legislative Assembly election : Athani
Party	Candidate	Votes	%	±%
INC	Laxman Savadi	131,404	68.34%	New
BJP	Mahesh. Irangouda. Kumathalli	55,282	28.75%	New
JD(S)	Shashikant Padasalagi	1,265	0.66%	New
NOTA	None of the above	1,037	0.54%	▼0.39
Margin of victory		76,122	39.59%	▲15.23
Turnout		192,291	83.90%	▲8.86
Total valid votes		192,279		
Registered electors		229,195		▲3.80
INC gain from BJP		Swing	▲7.91	

=== Assembly By-election 2019 ===
2019 Karnataka Legislative Assembly by-election : Athani
Party	Candidate	Votes	%	±%
BJP	Mahesh Kumathalli	99,203	60.43%	▲12.30
INC	Gajanan Bhalachandra Mangasuli	59,214	36.07%	New
Independent	Shrishail Tukkappa Halladamal	1,892	1.15%	New
Independent	Raju Parashuram Dawari	1,577	0.96%	New
NOTA	None of the above	1,532	0.93%	▲0.44
Margin of victory		39,989	24.36%	▲22.99
Turnout		165,685	75.04%	▼4.51
Total valid votes		164,153		
Registered electors		220,798		▲2.85
BJP gain from INC		Swing	▲12.30	

=== Assembly Election 2018 ===
2018 Karnataka Legislative Assembly election : Athani
Party	Candidate	Votes	%	±%
INC	Mahesh Kumathalli	82,094	48.13%	New
BJP	Laxman Sangappa Savadi	79,763	46.76%	New
JD(S)	Girish Kedareppa Butali	3,381	1.98%	New
NOTA	None of the above	842	0.49%	New
Margin of victory		2,331	1.37%	▼14.88
Turnout		170,786	79.55%	▲0.86
Total valid votes		170,565		
Registered electors		214,688		▲15.32
INC gain from BJP		Swing	▼2.66	

=== Assembly Election 2013 ===
2013 Karnataka Legislative Assembly election : Athani
Party	Candidate	Votes	%	±%
BJP	Laxman Savadi	74,299	50.79%	▲4.88
INC	Mahesh Iranagouda Kumathalli	50,528	34.54%	New
JD(S)	Sadashiv Kedari Butali	15,204	10.39%	New
KJP	Sanganagoud Gurupadagoud Patil	1,580	1.08%	New
BSP	Annappa Somanna Aigali	1,558	1.07%	New
Margin of victory		23,771	16.25%	▼1.25
Turnout		146,503	78.69%	▲5.51
Total valid votes		146,290		
Registered electors		186,167		▲9.99
BJP hold		Swing	▲4.88	

=== Assembly Election 2008 ===
2008 Karnataka Legislative Assembly election : Athani
Party	Candidate	Votes	%	±%
BJP	Laxman Savadi	56,847	45.91%	▼4.82
INC	Kirana Kumar Tatyagouda Patil	35,179	28.41%	New
JD(S)	Butali Sadashiv Kedari	24,033	19.41%	▲1.30
Rashtriya Hindustan Sena Karnataka	Krishnaji Laxman Rao Kundargi	2,749	2.22%	New
BSP	Navalgatti Sanjeev Balappa	2,627	2.12%	New
RPI(A)	Sunil Shankar Waghamare	1,835	1.48%	New
Margin of victory		21,668	17.50%	▼9.11
Turnout		123,867	73.18%	▲6.39
Total valid votes		123,830		
Registered electors		169,256		▼3.88
BJP hold		Swing	▼4.82	

=== Assembly Election 2004 ===
2004 Karnataka Legislative Assembly election : Athani
Party	Candidate	Votes	%	±%
BJP	Laxman Savadi	59,578	50.73%	New
INC	Dongaragaon Shahajan Ismail	28,325	24.12%	▼4.53
JD(S)	Butali Sadashiv Kedari	21,264	18.11%	New
BSP	Prakash Kamble	2,664	2.27%	New
JP	Arjun Bhagavant Patil	2,188	1.86%	New
Urs Samyuktha Paksha	Yallatti Shankar Basalingappa	1,693	1.44%	New
Kannada Nadu Party	Kaarani Mallikarjun Basappa	865	0.74%	New
Sirpanch Samaj Party	Inamadar Khurshid Banu Bashirahamad	858	0.73%	New
Margin of victory		31,253	26.61%	▲23.54
Turnout		117,608	66.79%	▼1.33
Total valid votes		117,435		
Registered electors		176,097		▲12.01
BJP gain from INC		Swing	▲22.08	

=== Assembly Election 1999 ===
1999 Karnataka Legislative Assembly election : Athani
Party	Candidate	Votes	%	±%
INC	Dongaragaon Shahajan Ismail	29,020	28.65%	New
Independent	Laxman Sangappa Savadi	25,911	25.58%	New
BJP	Patil Basavaprabhu Lakhagoud	22,755	22.47%	New
JD(U)	Leeladevi. R. Prasad	16,746	16.53%	▼17.82
JD(S)	Jyothirao Banti	4,174	4.12%	New
BSP	Gangaram Balu Satapute	1,614	1.59%	New
CPI(ML)L	Ravindra Dhanavant Halingali	1,058	1.04%	New
Margin of victory		3,109	3.07%	▼5.56
Turnout		107,096	68.12%	▲9.06
Total valid votes		101,278		
Registered electors		157,216		▲14.28
INC gain from JD		Swing	▼5.70	

=== Assembly Election 1994 ===
1994 Karnataka Legislative Assembly election : Athani
Party	Candidate	Votes	%	±%
JD	Leeladevi. R. Prasad	27,126	34.35%	New
INC	Irappa Marappa Shedashyal	20,313	25.73%	New
Independent	Anandrao Appasaheb Desai	12,446	15.76%	New
BJP	Siddagouda Anangouda Patil	9,886	12.52%	New
INC	Basavraj Revansiddappa Salagurgi	4,992	6.32%	New
Independent	Sadanand Bhimrao Badagi	2,180	2.76%	New
Independent	Dharappa Dundappa Kondi	490	0.62%	New
Margin of victory		6,813	8.63%	▼0.82
Turnout		81,254	59.06%	▼3.37
Total valid votes		78,958		
Registered electors		137,576		▲7.43
JD gain from INC		Swing	▼7.63	

=== Assembly Election 1989 ===
1989 Karnataka Legislative Assembly election : Athani
Party	Candidate	Votes	%	±%
INC	I. M. Shedshyal	31,144	41.98%	New
JD	V. L. Patil	24,130	32.52%	New
Kranti Sabha	B. L. Patil	13,645	18.39%	New
JP	G. B. Biradar	2,572	3.47%	New
Independent	R. N. Umarani	2,003	2.70%	New
Margin of victory		7,014	9.45%	▼5.25
Turnout		79,946	62.43%	▼3.37
Total valid votes		74,193		
Registered electors		128,066		▲27.42
INC gain from JP		Swing	▼14.79	

=== Assembly Election 1985 ===
1985 Karnataka Legislative Assembly election : Athani
Party	Candidate	Votes	%	±%
JP	Leeladevi. R. Prasad	36,983	56.77%	New
INC	Yashwanthrao Amarsinh Bhojraj Pawar Desai	27,409	42.08%	New
Independent	Sashepote Gangaram Balu	750	1.15%	New
Margin of victory		9,574	14.70%	▲5.63
Turnout		66,137	65.80%	▲10.47
Total valid votes		65,142		
Registered electors		100,505		▲8.16
JP gain from INC		Swing	▲8.16	

=== Assembly Election 1983 ===
1983 Karnataka Legislative Assembly election : Athani
Party	Candidate	Votes	%	±%
INC	Pawar Desai Sidharaj Alias Dhairyashilarao Bhojaraj	24,336	48.61%	▼1.96
JP	Kage Alagouda Bharamagoud	19,795	39.54%	New
BJP	Deshpande Arvind Bapurao	3,428	6.85%	New
Independent	Desai Anandrao Appasaheb	978	1.95%	New
Independent	Channya Dundyya Hiremath	918	1.83%	New
Independent	Krishnappa Chanabasappa Biradar	456	0.91%	New
Margin of victory		4,541	9.07%	▲0.11
Turnout		51,416	55.33%	▼8.20
Total valid votes		50,061		
Registered electors		92,919		▲6.44
INC gain from INC(I)		Swing	▼1.96	

=== Assembly Election 1978 ===
1978 Karnataka Legislative Assembly election : Athani
Party	Candidate	Votes	%	±%
INC(I)	Pawar Desai Sidharaj Alias Dhairyashilarao Bhojaraj	27,214	50.57%	New
JP	Leeladevi. R. Prasad	22,394	41.62%	New
INC	Patil Anagouda Babagouda	4,202	7.81%	New
Margin of victory		4,820	8.96%	▼14.85
Turnout		55,462	63.53%	▲3.02
Total valid votes		53,810		
Rejected ballots		1,652	2.98%	▲2.98
Registered electors		87,298		▲23.05
INC(I) gain from INC		Swing	▼10.36	

=== Assembly Election 1972 ===
1972 Mysore State Legislative Assembly election : Athani
Party	Candidate	Votes	%	±%
INC	Anandrao Appasaheb Desai	25,532	60.93%	New
INC(O)	S. Virangoud Patil	15,556	37.12%	New
Independent	Vijaya Satteppa Karoli	819	1.95%	New
Margin of victory		9,976	23.81%	▼25.39
Turnout		42,927	60.51%	▲0.12
Total valid votes		41,907		
Registered electors		70,947		▲11.13
INC hold		Swing	▼9.75	

=== Assembly Election 1967 ===
1967 Mysore State Legislative Assembly election : Athani
Party	Candidate	Votes	%	±%
INC	Dhairyashil Bhojraj Pawar	26,018	70.68%	▲3.72
Independent	Patil Anagouda Babagouda	7,908	21.48%	New
PSP	N. S. Tammanna	2,883	7.83%	New
Margin of victory		18,110	49.20%	▲13.22
Turnout		38,557	60.39%	▼2.58
Total valid votes		36,809		
Registered electors		63,844		▲26.28
INC hold		Swing	▲3.72	

=== Assembly Election 1962 ===
1962 Mysore State Legislative Assembly election : Athani
Party	Candidate	Votes	%	±%
INC	Dhairyashil Bhojraj Pawar	20,119	66.96%	New
Independent	Narasagauda Yalagauda Patil	9,307	30.98%	New
Independent	Balappa Ranu Waghe	458	1.52%	New
Margin of victory		10,812	35.98%	▲11.52
Turnout		31,839	62.97%	▲12.15
Total valid votes		30,046		
Registered electors		50,559		▲11.17
INC gain from Independent		Swing	▲4.73	

=== Assembly Election 1957 ===
1957 Mysore State Legislative Assembly election : Athani
Party	Candidate	Votes	%	±%
Independent	Pawar Jayawantrao Bhojrao	14,384	62.23%	New
INC	Dalvai Ningappa Bahadur	8,730	37.77%	New
Margin of victory		5,654	24.46%	▼30.58
Turnout		23,114	50.82%	▼2.19
Total valid votes		23,114		
Registered electors		45,480		▼0.65
Independent gain from INC		Swing	▼6.66	

=== Assembly Election 1952 ===
1952 Mysore State Legislative Assembly election : Athani
Party	Candidate	Votes	%	±%
INC	Patil Narasgauda Yelagonda	16,719	68.89%	New
Independent	Kulkarni Anantrao Balkrishna	3,362	13.85%	New
Independent	Nandrekar Surendra Tamanna	3,299	13.59%	New
KMPP	Kulkarni Anant Shamrao	889	3.66%	New
Margin of victory		13,357	55.04%	
Turnout		24,269	53.01%	
Total valid votes		24,269		
Registered electors		45,778		
INC gain from				

== See also ==
- Athani
- Belagavi district
- List of constituencies of Karnataka Legislative Assembly
