= Gauribidanur Assembly constituency =

Electoral district in Karnataka, Indıa

Coordinates: 13.61°N 77.52°E

Gauribidanur
- Constituency No. 139 for the Karnataka Legislative Assembly
- Map of Assembly constituency

Constituency details
- Country: India
- Region: South India
- State: Karnataka
- District: Chikkaballapur
- Lok Sabha constituency: Chikkaballapur
- Established: 1951
- Total electors: 210,462
- Reservation: None

Member of Legislative Assembly
- 16th Karnataka Legislative Assembly
- Incumbent K. H. Puttaswamy Gowda
- Party: Independent
- Elected year: 2023
- Preceded by: N. H. Shivashankara Reddy

Gauribidanur Assembly constituency is one of the 224 constituencies in the Karnataka Legislative Assembly of Karnataka, a southern state of India. It is also part of Chikballapur Lok Sabha constituency.

== Members of the Legislative Assembly ==
Election	Member	Party
1952	N. C. Nagaiah Reddy	Indian National Congress
1957	K. H. Venkata Reddy	Independent politician
1962	R. N. Lakshmipathi	Independent politician
1967	R. N. Lakshmipathi	Independent politician
1972	V. Krishna Rao	Indian National Congress
1978	B. N. K. Papaiah	Indian National Congress
1983	R. N. Lakshmipathi	Janata Party
1985	Mukhyamantri Chandru	Janata Party
1989	S. V. Ashwathanarayana Reddy	Indian National Congress
1994	Jyothi Reddy. N.	Janata Dal
1999	N. H. Shivashankara Reddy	Independent politician
2004	N. H. Shivashankara Reddy	Indian National Congress
2008	N. H. Shivashankara Reddy	Indian National Congress
2013	N. H. Shivashankara Reddy	Indian National Congress
2018	N. H. Shivashankara Reddy	Indian National Congress
2023	K. H. Puttaswamy Gowda	Independent politician

== Election results ==
=== Assembly Election 2023 ===
2023 Karnataka Legislative Assembly election : Gauribidanur
Party	Candidate	Votes	%	±%
Independent	K. H. Puttaswamy Gowda	83,837	46.37%	New
INC	N. H. Shivashankara Reddy	46,551	25.75%	▼15.16
Independent	Dr. Kemparaju. K	24,202	13.38%	New
JD(S)	C. R. Narasimha Murthy	11,125	6.15%	▼29.32
BJP	Dr. H. S. Shashidhara Kumar	8,132	4.50%	▼16.11
Independent	K. Puttaswamy Gowda	1,311	0.73%	New
NOTA	None of the above	561	0.31%	▼0.15
Margin of victory		37,286	20.62%	▲15.18
Turnout		181,370	86.18%	▲3.10
Total valid votes		180,815		
Registered electors		210,462		▲3.65
Independent gain from INC		Swing	▲5.46	

=== Assembly Election 2018 ===
2018 Karnataka Legislative Assembly election : Gauribidanur
Party	Candidate	Votes	%	±%
INC	N. H. Shivashankara Reddy	69,000	40.91%	▲7.60
JD(S)	C. R. Narasimha Murthy	59,832	35.47%	▲28.19
BJP	K. Jaipal Reddy	34,759	20.61%	▼0.55
CPI(M)	N. R. Ravichandrareddy	1,095	0.65%	New
NOTA	None of the above	784	0.46%	New
Margin of victory		9,168	5.44%	▲1.40
Turnout		168,693	83.08%	▲3.18
Total valid votes		168,670		
Registered electors		203,048		▲8.74
INC hold		Swing	▲7.60	

=== Assembly Election 2013 ===
2013 Karnataka Legislative Assembly election : Gauribidanur
Party	Candidate	Votes	%	±%
INC	N. H. Shivashankara Reddy	50,131	33.31%	▲2.90
Independent	K. Jaipal Reddy	44,056	29.27%	New
BJP	N. M. Ravinarayana Reddy	31,840	21.16%	▼0.57
JD(S)	S. V. Ashwathanarayana Reddy	10,957	7.28%	▼14.08
BSRCP	K. Somashekar	3,526	2.34%	New
KJP	Muralidar. P. S	1,735	1.15%	New
Independent	Syed Abhul Khasim	1,702	1.13%	New
Pyramid Party of India	M. Ramakrishnaiah	1,105	0.73%	New
BSP	Rajashekar Madiga	952	0.63%	▼0.56
Margin of victory		6,075	4.04%	▼4.64
Turnout		149,194	79.90%	▲5.67
Total valid votes		150,498		
Registered electors		186,727		▲7.71
INC hold		Swing	▲2.90	

=== Assembly Election 2008 ===
2008 Karnataka Legislative Assembly election : Gauribidanur
Party	Candidate	Votes	%	±%
INC	N. H. Shivashankara Reddy	39,127	30.41%	▼13.32
BJP	N. M. Ravinarayana Reddy	27,959	21.73%	New
JD(S)	Jyothi Reddy. N.	27,480	21.36%	▼15.30
Independent	Ashok Kumar. R	21,989	17.09%	New
Independent	K. V. Sadashivaiah	3,446	2.68%	New
Independent	Shivashankar. H. V	3,277	2.55%	New
CPI(M)	Siddagangappa	1,645	1.28%	New
BSP	Krishna Kumar. P. T	1,537	1.19%	New
LJP	Narasimha Murthy. B. K	1,502	1.17%	New
Margin of victory		11,168	8.68%	▲1.61
Turnout		128,673	74.23%	▲1.62
Total valid votes		128,661		
Registered electors		173,355		▲10.68
INC hold		Swing	▼13.32	

=== Assembly Election 2004 ===
2004 Karnataka Legislative Assembly election : Gauribidanur
Party	Candidate	Votes	%	±%
INC	N. H. Shivashankara Reddy	49,636	43.73%	▲11.47
JD(S)	Jyothi Reddy. N.	41,611	36.66%	▲11.08
JD(U)	Lakshminarayana. S. H	16,750	14.76%	▲8.09
JP	Krishna Kumar. P. T	4,028	3.55%	New
Kannada Nadu Party	Pathan Rahamatulla	1,490	1.31%	New
Margin of victory		8,025	7.07%	▲6.24
Turnout		113,732	72.61%	▼2.68
Total valid votes		113,515		
Registered electors		156,629		▲7.63
INC gain from Independent		Swing	▲10.65	

=== Assembly Election 1999 ===
1999 Karnataka Legislative Assembly election : Gauribidanur
Party	Candidate	Votes	%	±%
Independent	N. H. Shivashankara Reddy	34,541	33.08%	New
INC	S. V. Ashwathanarayana Reddy	33,679	32.26%	▲18.25
JD(S)	Jyothi Reddy. N.	26,705	25.58%	New
JD(U)	T. N. Seetharam	6,965	6.67%	New
Independent	K. V. Sadashivaiah	1,553	1.49%	New
BSP	H. L. Venkatesh	689	0.66%	New
Margin of victory		862	0.83%	▼7.28
Turnout		109,568	75.29%	▼2.81
Total valid votes		104,405		
Rejected ballots		5,114	4.67%	▲3.00
Registered electors		145,520		▲14.42
Independent gain from JD		Swing	▼10.30	

=== Assembly Election 1994 ===
1994 Karnataka Legislative Assembly election : Gauribidanur
Party	Candidate	Votes	%	±%
JD	Jyothi Reddy. N.	42,159	43.38%	▲7.13
Independent	S. V. Ashwathanarayana Reddy	34,274	35.27%	New
INC	G. V. Krishna Murthy	13,620	14.01%	▼35.39
BJP	N. T. Madanagopala Reddy	5,284	5.44%	New
INC	G. Nanujundappa	863	0.89%	New
Margin of victory		7,885	8.11%	▼5.04
Turnout		99,332	78.10%	▲4.35
Total valid votes		97,184		
Rejected ballots		1,657	1.67%	▼3.49
Registered electors		127,179		▲7.41
JD gain from INC		Swing	▼6.02	

=== Assembly Election 1989 ===
1989 Karnataka Legislative Assembly election : Gauribidanur
Party	Candidate	Votes	%	±%
INC	S. V. Ashwathanarayana Reddy	40,911	49.40%	▲6.89
JD	Jyothi Reddy. N.	30,020	36.25%	New
JP	Hanumappa Reddy. K. V	8,609	10.40%	New
Independent	Adinarayanappa	1,876	2.27%	New
Margin of victory		10,891	13.15%	▲2.96
Turnout		87,315	73.75%	▲0.27
Total valid votes		82,810		
Rejected ballots		4,505	5.16%	▼5.39
Registered electors		118,400		▲19.59
INC gain from JP		Swing	▼3.30	

=== Assembly Election 1985 ===
1985 Karnataka Legislative Assembly election : Gauribidanur
Party	Candidate	Votes	%	±%
JP	Mukhyamantri Chandru	34,291	52.70%	▲0.54
INC	B. N. K. Papaiah	27,660	42.51%	▼3.81
Independent	B. N. Devadas	891	1.37%	New
Independent	Jayachandra	537	0.83%	New
Independent	H. Ramaiah	519	0.80%	New
Independent	N. C. Lakshmipathy Babu	401	0.62%	New
Margin of victory		6,631	10.19%	▲4.35
Turnout		72,744	73.48%	▼2.19
Total valid votes		65,066		
Rejected ballots		7,678	10.55%	▲8.42
Registered electors		99,002		▲11.63
JP hold		Swing	▲0.54	

=== Assembly Election 1983 ===
1983 Karnataka Legislative Assembly election : Gauribidanur
Party	Candidate	Votes	%	±%
JP	R. N. Lakshmipathi	34,260	52.16%	▲6.57
INC	V. Krishna Rao	30,426	46.32%	▲44.66
Independent	Kumaraswamy	998	1.52%	New
Margin of victory		3,834	5.84%	▲0.02
Turnout		67,113	75.67%	▼6.59
Total valid votes		65,684		
Rejected ballots		1,429	2.13%	▼0.45
Registered electors		88,691		▲8.25
JP gain from INC(I)		Swing	▲0.75	

=== Assembly Election 1978 ===
1978 Karnataka Legislative Assembly election : Gauribidanur
Party	Candidate	Votes	%	±%
INC(I)	B. N. K. Papaiah	33,756	51.41%	New
JP	R. N. Lakshmipathi	29,932	45.59%	New
INC	Ramaiah. K. L	1,089	1.66%	▼58.24
Independent	Mohan. C. S	564	0.86%	New
Margin of victory		3,824	5.82%	▼15.63
Turnout		67,391	82.26%	▲12.42
Total valid votes		65,655		
Rejected ballots		1,736	2.58%	▲2.58
Registered electors		81,928		▲9.45
INC(I) gain from INC		Swing	▼8.49	

=== Assembly Election 1972 ===
1972 Mysore State Legislative Assembly election : Gauribidanur
Party	Candidate	Votes	%	±%
INC	V. Krishna Rao	30,469	59.90%	▼11.57
INC(O)	R. N. Lakshmipathi	19,556	38.45%	New
Independent	T. M. Anjaiah Setty	477	0.94%	New
ABJS	Seetharama Reddy	365	0.72%	New
Margin of victory		10,913	21.45%	▲12.45
Turnout		52,278	69.84%	▲13.83
Total valid votes		50,867		
Registered electors		74,856		▲26.73
INC gain from Independent		Swing	▼20.57	

=== Assembly Election 1967 ===
1967 Mysore State Legislative Assembly election : Goribindnur
Party	Candidate	Votes	%	±%
Independent	R. N. Lakshmipathi	23,598	80.47%	New
INC	K. H. V. Reddi	20,959	71.47%	▲30.80
Margin of victory		2,639	9.00%	▼9.67
Turnout		33,082	56.01%	▼16.24
Total valid votes		29,327		
Registered electors		59,067		▼1.80
Independent hold		Swing	▲21.14	

=== Assembly Election 1962 ===
1962 Mysore State Legislative Assembly election : Gauribidanur
Party	Candidate	Votes	%	±%
Independent	R. N. Lakshmipathi	24,391	59.33%	New
INC	K. H. Venkata Reddy	16,718	40.67%	▲10.30
Margin of victory		7,673	18.67%	▼17.65
Turnout		43,459	72.25%	▲2.48
Total valid votes		41,109		
Registered electors		60,148		▲11.04
Independent hold		Swing	▼7.36	

=== Assembly Election 1957 ===
1957 Mysore State Legislative Assembly election : Gauribidanur
Party	Candidate	Votes	%	±%
Independent	K. H. Venkata Reddy	25,203	66.69%	New
INC	N. C. Nagaiah Reddy	11,476	30.37%	▼22.55
Independent	Hanumantharayappa	1,114	2.95%	New
Margin of victory		13,727	36.32%	▲24.97
Turnout		37,793	69.77%	▲9.52
Total valid votes		37,793		
Registered electors		54,166		▲22.60
Independent gain from INC		Swing	▲13.77	

=== Assembly Election 1952 ===
1952 Mysore State Legislative Assembly election : Goribindnur
Party	Candidate	Votes	%	±%
INC	N. C. Nagaiah Reddy	14,087	52.92%	New
Independent	Venkatasami Gowda	11,066	41.57%	New
Independent	T. Chandraiah	1,464	5.50%	New
Margin of victory		3,021	11.35%	
Turnout		26,617	60.25%	
Total valid votes		26,617		
Registered electors		44,180		
INC win (new seat)				

== See also ==
- Chikballapur district
- List of constituencies of Karnataka Legislative Assembly
