= R. Roshan Baig =

Indian politician

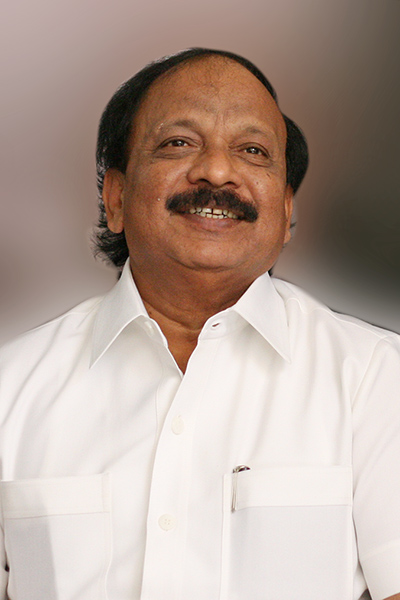

Minister of Home Affairs
- In office June 1996 – August 1999

Minister for Urban Development, Minister for Infrastructure, Minister for Haj
- In office 01 January 2014 – 30 May 2018
- Constituency: Shivajinagar

MLA of Karnataka Legislative Assembly
- In office 2008 - 2019
- Preceded by: Katta Subramanya Naidu
- Succeeded by: Arshad Rizwan
- Constituency: Shivajinagar
- In office 1999-2008
- Preceded by: R. Krishnappa
- Succeeded by: Seat disestablished
- Constituency: Jayamahal
- In office 1994-1999
- Preceded by: A. K. Anatha Krishna
- Succeeded by: Katta Subramanya Naidu
- Constituency: Shivajinagar
- In office 1985-1989
- Preceded by: M. Raghupathy
- Succeeded by: A. K. Anatha Krishna
- Constituency: Shivajinagar

Personal details
- Born: 15 July 1951 (age 75) Bangalore, Mysore State, India
- Party: Indian National Congress, Janata Party
- Spouse: Sabiha Fatima
- Children: 3
- Website: http://rroshanbaig.com/

R. Roshan Baig is a former seven-time member of the Karnataka Legislative Assembly and Minister from South Indian state of Karnataka. He has also been vice-chairman of the Al-Ameen Educational Society. A seven-time MLA, from 1984 to 1994 he was the member of the Janata Party for the first two terms as the MLA and from 1994 to 2019 he was the member of the Indian National Congress for 5 of his MLA terms. Baig was suspended from the Indian National Congress in 2019 after he insulted top Congress leaders for the party's poor performance in the 2019 Lok Sabha polls, Roshan Baig had held former Karnataka Chief Minister Siddaramaiah's "arrogance" and Dinesh Gundu Rao's "immaturity" responsible for the "flop show". He was also blamed for praising Prime Minister Narendra Modi's initiatives for inclusive development.

He was elected to the Karnataka Legislative Assembly for a record seven-times from Shivajinagar Assembly Constituency and Shivajinagar was touted as his bastion for over 4 decades.

== Early life ==
Baig was born premature and had health problems as a child. He had poor attendance and failed his 8th standard exam. Ultimately, he passed high school and was admitted to RC College in Bangalore, where he contested his first election, for the post of General Secretary against Nagathihalli Chandrashekhar. After earning a bachelor's degree in commerce, he studied for his L.L.B. at a government law college.

== Political career ==
Abdul Samad Siddiqui got him into politics in Janta party. He won the 1985 state elections for the 8th Assembly with the Janata Party. After the division of that party, he moved to the Indian National Congress party.

As a prominent face in Bangalore Central and Bangalore North, he's touted as the face of Muslim community in Karnataka. He was an MLA from Shivajinagar which is a Muslim majority constituency with a substantial Hindu population.

Baig claims 99% attendance to the assembly.

=== Posts held ===
- Minister of State for Home (Independent Charge)
- Minister for Tourism and Haj
- Minister for Medium & Small Scale Industries
- Minister for Infrastructure
- Minister for Information, Public Relations and Haj
- Minister For Urban Development, City Corporations, Urban Land Transport KUWSDB & KUIDFC, Haj Information & Wakf
- Member of the 8th, 10th, 11th, 12th, 13th, 14th, 15th and 16th Karnataka Legislative Assembly

== Controversies ==
In 2012 The Hindu published news about forgery case against him, in a property deal. He was later cleared of his charges.

In 2004, Baig had to resign as minister following his brother Rehan’s alleged involvement in the multi-crore fake stamp paper scandal.

The complaint against Baig is that in 2006 he bought a 1.1-acre plot in Begur Hobli, on the outskirts of Bangalore, from Keonics for a paltry sum on the pretext that he wanted to start a small-scale industry. He, however entered into a joint development agreement with Prestige Group for the construction of a commercial complex.

=== Suspension from Indian National Congress ===
The Congress Party suspended Roshan Baig on 18 June 2019, on account of what it termed "anti-party activities" after he insulted top Congress leaders for the party's poor performance in the 2019 Lok Sabha polls, Roshan Baig had held former Karnataka Chief Minister Siddaramaiah's "arrogance" and Dinesh Gundu Rao's "immaturity" responsible for the "flop show". Dinesh Gundu Rao who was embroiled in a bitter feud with Baig had also drawn the party's attention to Baig's entanglement in the events surrounding I Monetary Advisory.

== Honors ==
Recently he has been honored with the life membership of the International Film And Television Club of Asian Academy of Film & Television.
