= Kachamachanahalli, Gauribidanur =

Village in Chickballpur District

Kachamachanahalli
- Village
- Location in Karnataka, India Kachamachanahalli (India)
- Coordinates: 13.5685794°N 77.4479203°E
- Country: India
- State: Karnataka
- District: Chikkaballapura
- Talukas: Gauribidanur
- Elevation: 684 m (2,244 ft)

Population (2011)
  - Total: 1,603

Languages
  - Official: Kannada, Telugu
- Time zone: UTC+5:30 (IST)
- PIN: 561213
- Telephone code: 08155
- Vehicle registration: KA 40
- Lok Sabha constituency: Chikballapur (Lok Sabha constituency)

Kachamachanahalli is a village in the southern state of Karnataka, India. It is located in the Gauribidanur taluk of Chikkaballapura district in Karnataka. It is situated 9 km away from sub-district headquarter Gauribidanur and 45 km away from district headquarter Chikkaballapura

== Demographics ==
According to Census 2011 information the location code or village code of Kachamachanahalli village is 623217. Kachamachanahalli belongs to Gedare gram panchayat.

The total geographical area of village is 563.36 hectares. Kachamachanahalli has a total population of 1,603 peoples with 796 males and 807 females. There are about 372 houses in Kachamachanahalli village. Gauribidanur is nearest town to Kachamachanahalli which is approximately 9 km away.

== Economy ==
People belonging to the Kachamachanahalli village grow very much maize, millet silk, etc. The major occupations of the residents of Kachamachanahalli are sericulture and dairy farming. The dairy cooperative is the largest individual milk supplying cooperative in the state.

== Facilities ==
Kachamachanahalli has below types of facilities.

- Government primary School
- Kachamachanahalli KMF (Karnataka Milk Federation) Dairy
- Government Grocery store

== Temples ==
- Sri Bommalingeshwara Temple
- Kadri Lakshmi Narasimha Temple
