= Naganur =

Naganur Chapana
- Village
- Location in Karnataka, India Naganur (India)
- Coordinates: 16.14°N 74.81°E
- Country: India
- State: Karnataka
- District: Belgaum
- Talukas: Gokak

Population (2001)
  - Total: 13,459

Languages
  - Official: Kannada
- Time zone: UTC+5:30 (IST)
- Nearest city: Direfaka
- Sex ratio: 20% men 30% women ♂/♀

Naganur is a village in the southern state of Karnataka, India. It is located in the Mudalagi taluk of Belagavi district in Karnataka.

== Demographics ==
According to the 2001 India census, Naganur had a population of 13,459 with 6820 males and 6639 females.

== See also ==
- Gokak
- Belgaum
- Districts of Karnataka
