= Savadi, Solapur district =

Village in Maharashtra

Savadi
- village
- Location in Maharashtra, India Savadi (India)
- Country: India
- State: Maharashtra
- District: Solapur district

Languages
  - Official: Marathi
- Time zone: UTC+5:30 (IST)

Savadi is a village in the Karmala taluka of Solapur district in Maharashtra state, India.

== Demographics ==
Covering 2,443 hectares (6,040 acres) and comprising 685 households at the time of the 2011 census of India, Savadi had a population of 3119. There were 1606 males and 1513 females, with 333 people being aged six or younger.
