= Thondebhavi =

Village in Chickballpur District

- Village
- Location in Karnataka, India Thondebhavi (India)
- Coordinates: 13.4938646°N 77.4118476°E
- Country: India
- State: Karnataka
- District: Chikkaballapura
- Talukas: Gauribidanur
- Elevation: 684 m (2,244 ft)

Population (2011)
  - Total: 4,791

Languages
  - Official: Kannada, Urdu language
- Time zone: UTC+5:30 (IST)
- PIN: 561213
- Telephone code: 08155
- Vehicle registration: KA 40
- Lok Sabha constituency: Chikballapur (Lok Sabha constituency)

Thondebhavi is a village in the southern state of Karnataka, India. It is located in the Gauribidanur taluk of Chikkaballapura district in Karnataka. It is situated 13 km away from sub-district headquarter Gauribidanur and 25 km away from district headquarter Chikkaballapura

== Demographics ==
According to Census 2011 information the location code or village code of Thondebhavi village is 623375. Thondebhavi village is also a gram panchayat.

The total geographical area of village is 838.47 hectares. Thondebhavi has a total population of 4,791 peoples with 2,404 males and 2,387 females. There are about 1148 houses in Thondebhavi village. Gauribidanur is nearest town to Thondebhavi which is approximately 13 km away.

== Economy ==
Agriculture is the main occupation for people belongs to Thondebhavi. The land of this part is composed of black and red, Most of the land is cultivated with maize, sunflower, millet, silk, a little vegetable, flowers.

== Facilities ==
Thondebhavi has below types of facilities.

- Government higher primary School
- Government high School
- AVNR PU College
- Nursery school
- Primary Health Center
- Veterinary Hospital
- Pragathi Krishna Gramina Bank
- BSNL Telephone Exchange
- State Bank Of India
- Public Library
- Post Office
- Agriculture Centre
- RMC Market
- Sports Room
- Railway Station
- Axis Bank ATM
- Gram panchayat office (mandal office)
- Post office - Owned by Government of India.
- Hindupur-Bangalore highway (KA SH 94)
- Pinakini River
- ACC Cement Factory
- Public Toilet
- Lodge
- Garment
- Hotels

== Places of Worship ==
- Noorani Masjid
- Hanuman Temple
- Shaneshwara Temple
- Maramma Temple
- Gangamma Temple
- Jamiya Masjid
- Mylara lingeshwara swamy temple
