= Kurudi, Gauribidanur =

Village in Chickballpur District

Kurudi
- Village
- Location in Karnataka, India Kurudi (India)
- Coordinates: 13.6231484°N 77.38176°E
- Country: India
- State: Karnataka
- District: Chikkaballapura
- Talukas: Gauribidanur
- Elevation: 684 m (2,244 ft)

Population (2011)
  - Total: 2,870

Languages
  - Official: Kannada
- Time zone: UTC+5:30 (IST)
- PIN: 561210
- Telephone code: 08155
- Vehicle registration: KA 40
- Lok Sabha constituency: Chikballapur (Lok Sabha constituency)

Kurudi is a village in the southern state of Karnataka, India. It is located in the Gauribidanur taluk of Chikkaballapura district in Karnataka. It is situated 18 km away from sub-district headquarter Gauribidanur and 53 km away from district headquarter Chikkaballapura.

== Demographics ==
According to Census 2011 information the location code or village code of Kurudi village is 623199. Kurudi village is also a gram panchayat. Villages comes under Kurudi gram Panchayat are Ranganahalli, Kadirenahalli, Hosa Upparahalli, Dronakunte, Kurudi and Anudi.

The total geographical area of village is 1347.37 hectares. Kurudi has a total population of 2,870 peoples with 1,458 males and 1,412 females. There are about 700 houses in Kurudi village. Gauribidanur is nearest town to Kurudi which is approximately 18 km away.

== Economy ==
Agriculture the main occupation of Kurudi people. People belonging to the Kurudi village grow very much maize, millet silk, etc. The major occupations of the residents of Kurudi is dairy farming. The dairy cooperative is the largest individual milk supplying cooperative in the state.

== Facilities ==
Kurudi has below types of facilities.

- Government higher primary School
- Government high School
- Kurudi KMF (Karnataka Milk Federation) Dairy
- Government Grocery store
- Kurudi Gram Panchayat Office
- Government Primary health center
- State Bank of India (SBIN0041183)
- Kurudi Forest Area
- Dr HN Science Center

== Temples ==
- Anjaneya Temple
- Shri 1008 Bhagwan Parshwanath Digambar Jain Temple
- Eswara Temple

== See also ==
Ramapura
