= N. H. Shivashankara Reddy =

Indian politician

N. H. Shivashankara
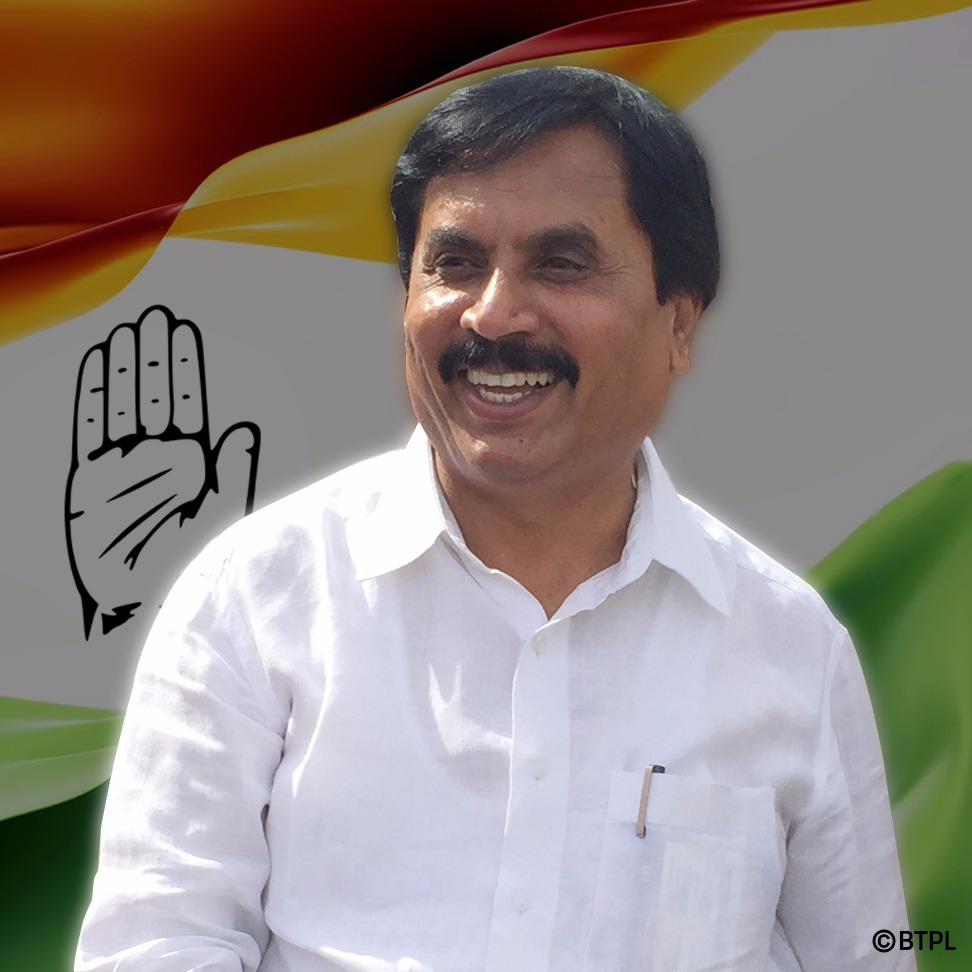

Minister of Agriculture, Government of Karnataka
- In office 6 June 2018 – 25 July 2019
- Preceded by: Krishna Byre Gowda
- Succeeded by: Laxman Savadi
- Constituency: Gauribidanur

Deputy Speaker of the Karnataka Legislative Assembly
- In office 31 May 2013 – 18 May 2018
- Preceded by: G.H Tippareddy
- Succeeded by: M. Krishna Reddy
- Constituency: Gauribidanur

Member of the Karnataka Legislative Assembly for Gauribidanur
- In office 1999–2023
- Preceded by: N. Jyothi Reddy
- Succeeded by: K H Puttaswamy Gowda

Personal details
- Born: 24 September 1954 (age 72) H. Nagasandra, Gowribidanur
- Party: Indian National Congress (From 2004)
- Other political affiliations: Independent (Till 2004)
- Spouse: Sujathamma
- Children: 2
- Education: Bachelor of Science in Agriculture

Nagasandra Hanumantha Shivashankara Reddy (born 24 September 1954) is an Indian politician from Karnataka. He is a former Member of the Legislative Assembly representing the Indian National Congress. He is the former deputy speaker of the Karnataka Legislative Assembly and 2018 Agriculture minister of Karnataka. He was a Member of Karnataka Legislative Assembly from Gauribidanur Assembly constituency for five consecutive terms.

== Early life and education ==
Reddy was born on in a Vokkaliga family in H. Nagasandra village, Gowribidanur taluk, Chikkaballapura district, Karnataka to Subhashanamma and N. S. Hanumantha Reddy. He holds a bachelor's degree in agricultural sciences from the University of Agricultural Sciences, Dharwad. He married Sujathamma and they have two children.

== Career ==
Reddy was first elected in the Gauribidanur Assembly constituency winning the 1999 Karnataka Legislative Assembly election.after he was denied a ticket by the Indian National Congress Party. Earlier, he served at the village council level. He retained the seat contesting on the Congress ticket in the 2004 Karnataka Legislative Assembly election and won for three more times in the 2008, 2013 and 2018 Assembly elections.

In July 2013, he was unanimously elected the Deputy Speaker of the Assembly. He was the Minister for Agriculture in H D Kumarswamy's second cabinet. In 2023 Karnataka Legislative Assembly election, he lost the Gauribidanur seat to K H Puttaswamy Gowda, an independent candidate, by a margin 37,286 votes.
