= Naganur (P.K.) =

- Village
- Country: India
- State: Karnataka
- District: Belgaum
- Talukas: Athani

Area
  - Total: 7.8903 km^{2} (3.0465 sq mi)
- Elevation: 547 m (1,795 ft)

Population (2011)
  - Total: 2,462
  - Density: 312.0/km^{2} (808.2/sq mi)

Languages
  - Official: Kannada
- Time zone: UTC+5:30 (IST)
- 591240>: 597312

Naganur (P.K.) is a village in Belgaum district of Karnataka, India.
