= Savadi, Belgaum =

Savadi, Belgaum Savadi
- Village
- Location in Karnataka, India Savadi, Belgaum (India)
- Coordinates: 16.72°N 75.06°E
- Country: India
- State: Karnataka
- District: Belgaum
- Talukas: Athani

Population (2001)
  - Total: 6,515

Languages
  - Official: Kannada
- Time zone: UTC+5:30 (IST)
- PIN: 591260
- Nearest city: Bijapur

Savadi is a village in the southern state of Karnataka, India. It is located in the Athani taluk of Belgaum district. Located on the banks of the Krishna river, also called Uttaravahini - which flows northwards at Savadi, most of the population here is largely dependent on agriculture for its sustenance. Animals domesticated are buffaloes, goats, dogs, horse, bullocks, sheep and fowl. Historically being a belt of Jowar cultivation, with the recent irrigation projects near the village, from the past two decades, the chief crop has been sugarcane. Savadi is closely located to many sugar industries of the Krishna basin, and is part of the major supplier belt of sugarcane in Athani Taluk, and consequently Belgaum district.

== History ==
Savadi is one of those place in South India, that traces back its history to the Neolithic age. Earliest painted pottery has been found in the tract between Savadi and Satti. In the Krishna basin, wheel-turned grey and red-wares are found, but only in small numbers. The painted pottery was painted in black, and in some cases thin white colour was used. The painted motifs included a variety of designs and animals like fish, stork, dog, peacock, deer, etc. Designs were also engraved in relievo.

Unwritten lore says that Savadi was the hermitage of a sage named Saudagnya, who performed his penance here; hence the name.

The village mosque stands tall and strong from the era of the Adil Shahi of Bijapur. The Gopalakrishna temple, that lies close to the river bank, is an ancient temple built in the (Kalyana)Chalukyan style of architecture. The presiding deity of the temple is Lord Gopalakrishna also known as Venugopal. It is a typical Trikuteshwar style temple housing two magnificent Shiva Lingas. More relics of the same temple can be found embedded in the steps of the ghats connecting to the riverbank to the village. Minor temples on the ghat and the Uttareshwara temple that lies in the river bed and becomes visible only in the dry summers, are also vital clues to the history of the region.

In addition to these, Savadi is home to Bhavimani Hanuman Temple. Located within a house, this temple is situated underground, accessed by a small set of steps. A small well is located beside the underground temple. The temple is associated with local families and is used for religious rituals.

== Robbery and restoration of the Gopalakrishna idol ==
In the year 2000, some anti social elements dug at the base of the Shiva Lingas and stole the Gopalakrishna idol. Later on, the stolen idol was discovered near Shiraguppi village(on the other side of the river). The idol has since been placed in the Vithoba temple of the village for worship. Subsequently, though some Government officials have visited this long neglected ancient temple, including those from the archaeological department, no concrete measures have been taken to restore this monument of historic and cultural importance. The entire surrounding of the magnificent temple is covered by uncontrolled growth of trees and dirt. However, Shri. Sharad Savadi whose forefathers were the Archaks of the temple is doing whatever is possible within his means for the upkeep and maintenance of this temple and for the day today Pooja of Gopalkrishna idol.

== Demographics and People ==
As of 2001 India census, Savadi had a population of 6515 with 3349 males and 3166 females.

Savadi is a hamlet with a co-existence of various communities. The annual fairs of the Sanganabasaweshwar Mutt, the Alab celebrated by Muslims, the week-long mud and milk festival of Lord Hanuman are all part and partial of Savadi's culture. The folk songs sung on these occasions are some of the rarest folklore of this region, and have consistently lacked government's attention. The annual fair in Darga, a neighbouring hamlet, consisting of about 50 houses, commemorating the death anniversary of a sufi saint, is the most happening event of the year for the locals. The Dasara celebration where there is a generous exchange of sweets, and wishing of good luck among every villager deserves special mention. The chief language spoken is Kannada.

With no good schools in Savadi, the kids travel to nearby places for their schooling. Being located remotely, Savadi lacks banks and basic healthcare facilities. Every Thursday is the village bazaar.

== See also ==
- Belgaum
- Districts of Karnataka
