= Gauribidanur =

Gauribidanur <Gauribidanuru>
- Taluk
- Location in Karnataka, India
- Coordinates: 13°36′40″N 77°31′00″E
- Country: India
- State: Karnataka
- District: Chikkaballapur

Government
  - Type: Municipal Council
- Elevation: 694 m (2,277 ft)

Population (2020)
  - Total: 37,947

Languages
  - Official: Kannada
- Time zone: UTC+5:30 (IST)
- PIN: 561208
- Vehicle registration: KA 40
- Lok Sabha constituency: Chikkaballapur

Gauribidanur is a taluk situated in Chikkaballapur district in the Indian state of Karnataka.. Gauribidanur is located at 75 kms from Bengaluru and 32 kms from district head quarter Chikkaballapur.

== Geography ==
Gauribidanur is at 13.61°N 77.52°E. It has an average elevation of 694 metres (2276 feet).

== Demographics ==
As of 2011 India census, Gauribidanur had a population of 37,947. Males constitute 49.72% of the population and females 50.28%. Gauribidanur has an average literacy rate of 72%, higher than the national average of 59.5%: male literacy is 77%, and female literacy is 67%. In Gauribidanur, 11% of the population is under 6 years of age.
