= List of members of the Karnataka Legislative Council =

The Karnataka Legislative Council, (officially in Kannada, Karnataka Vidhana Parishad) is the upper house of the bicameral legislature of Karnataka state in south western India.

== Members of Karnataka Legislative Council ==
This is a list of current and past members of the Karnataka Legislative Council. The state elects members for a term of 6 years. 25 members are indirectly elected by the state legislators, 25 members are elected by Local Authorities, 7 from Graduates constituencies and 7 from teachers constituencies. The Governor of Karnataka nominates up to 11 eminent people as members from various fields.

=== Current members ===
#	constituency	Member	Party	Term start	Term end
Elected by Legislative Assembly
1	Legislative Assembly	B. K. Hariprasad	INC	1-Jul-2026	30-Jun-2032
1	Legislative Assembly	B. K. Hariprasad	INC	1-Jul-2020	30-Jun-2026
2	Legislative Assembly	P. V. Mohan	INC	1-Jul-2026	30-Jun-2032
3	Legislative Assembly	Tippannappa Kamaknoor	INC	1 July 2026	30-Jun-2032
4	Legislative Assembly	Shivanna Malavalli	INC	1 July 2026	30-Jun-2032
5	Legislative Assembly	Vinay Karthik Prakash	INC	1-Jul-2026	30-Jun-2032
6	Legislative Assembly	N. S. Boseraju	INC	18-Jun-2024	17-Jun-2030
6	Legislative Assembly	N. S. Boseraju	INC	3-Jul-2023	17-Jun-2024
6	Legislative Assembly	N. S. Boseraju	INC	1 July 2014	30 June 2020
7	Legislative Assembly	Yathindra Siddaramaiah	INC	18-Jun-2024	17-Jun-2030
8	Legislative Assembly	K. Govindaraj	INC	18-Jun-2024	17-Jun-2030
8	Legislative Assembly	K. Govindaraj	INC	18-Jun-2018	17-Jun-2024
8	Legislative Assembly	K. Govindaraj	INC	18-Jun-2012	17-Jun-2018
9	Legislative Assembly	A. Vasanth Kumar	INC	18-Jun-2024	17-Jun-2030
10	Legislative Assembly	Bilkis Bano	INC	18-Jun-2024	17-Jun-2030
11	Legislative Assembly	Ivan D'Souza	INC	18-Jun-2024	17-Jun-2030
12	Legislative Assembly	Jagdev Guttedar	INC	18-Jun-2024	17-Jun-2030
13	Legislative Assembly	M. Nagaraju Yadav	INC	14-Jun-2022	13-Jun-2028
14	Legislative Assembly	K. Abdul Jabbar	INC	14-Jun-2022	13-Jun-2028
15	Legislative Assembly	Basanagouda Badarli	INC	11-Jul-2024	13-Jun-2028
16	Legislative Assembly	Raghu Kautilya	BJP	1-Jul-2026	30-Jun-2032
17	Legislative Assembly	Lingaraj Patil	BJP	1-Jul-2026	30-Jun-2032
18	Legislative Assembly	C. T. Ravi	BJP	18-Jun-2024	17-Jun-2030
19	Legislative Assembly	N. Ravikumar	BJP	18-Jun-2024	17-Jun-2030
20	Legislative Assembly	Marutirao Muley	BJP	18-Jun-2024	17-Jun-2030
21	Legislative Assembly	S Keshava Prasad	BJP	14-Jun-2022	13-Jun-2028
22	Legislative Assembly	Hemalatha Nayak	BJP	14-Jun-2022	13-Jun-2028
23	Legislative Assembly	Chalavadi Narayanaswamy	BJP	14-Jun-2022	13-Jun-2028
24	Legislative Assembly	T. N. Javarayi Gowda	JDS	18-Jun-2024	17-Jun-2030
25	Legislative Assembly	T.A. Sharavana	JDS	14-Jun-2022	13-Jun-2028
Elected by Local Authorities
1	Bidar	Bhimrao Patil	INC	6-Jan-2022	5-Jan-2028
2	Kalaburagi–Yadgir	B. G. Patil	BJP	6-Jan-2022	5-Jan-2028
3	Bijapur–Bagalkot	Sunil Gouda B. Patil	INC	6-Jan-2022	5-Jan-2028
4	Bijapur–Bagalkot	P. H. Poojara	BJP	6-Jan-2022	5-Jan-2028
5	Belgaum	Channaraj Hattiholi	INC	6-Jan-2022	5-Jan-2028
6	Belgaum	Lakhan Jarakiholi	Ind	6-Jan-2022	5-Jan-2028
7	Uttara Kannada	Ganapathi Ulvekar	BJP	6-Jan-2022	5-Jan-2028
8	Dharwad–Gadag–Haveri	Saleem Ahmed	INC	6-Jan-2022	5-Jan-2028
9	Dharwad–Gadag–Haveri	Pradeep Shettar	BJP	6-Jan-2022	5-Jan-2028
10	Raichur–Koppal	Sharana Gowda Patil	INC	6-Jan-2022	5-Jan-2028
11	Bellary–Vijaynagar	Y. M. Satish	BJP	6-Jan-2022	5-Jan-2028
12	Chitradurga–Davangere	K. S. Naveen	BJP	6-Jan-2022	5-Jan-2028
13	Shivamogga	D. S. Arun	BJP	6-Jan-2022	5-Jan-2028
14	Dakshina Kannada–Udupi	Kishore B.R.	BJP	21-Oct-2024	5-Jan-2028
15	Dakshina Kannada–Udupi	Manjunath Bhandari	INC	6-Jan-2022	5-Jan-2028
16	Chikmagaluru	A. V. Gayatri Shanthegowda	INC	16-Jul-2026	5-Jan-2028
17	Hassan	Suraj Revanna	JDS	6-Jan-2022	5-Jan-2028
18	Tumakuru	R. Rajendra	INC	6-Jan-2022	5-Jan-2028
19	Mandya	M. G. Gooligowda	INC	6-Jan-2022	5-Jan-2028
20	Bengaluru Urban	H. S. Gopinath Reddy	BJP	6-Jan-2022	5-Jan-2028
21	Bengaluru Rural–Ramanagar	Shambulingaiah Ravi	INC	6-Jan-2022	5-Jan-2028
22	Kolar–Chikkaballapur	Anil Kumar	INC	6-Jan-2022	5-Jan-2028
23	Kodagu	Suja Kushalappa	BJP	6-Jan-2022	5-Jan-2028
24	Mysuru–Chamarajanagara	C. N. Manje Gowda	JDS	6-Jan-2022	5-Jan-2028
25	Mysuru–Chamarajanagara	D. Thimmaiah	INC	6-Jan-2022	5-Jan-2028
Elected by Graduates
1	Karnataka South-East Graduates	Chidanand M. Gowda	BJP	10-Nov-2020	9-Nov-2026
2	Karnataka North-East Graduates	Chandrasekhar Patil	INC	22-Jun-2024	21-Jun-2030
3	Karnataka North-West Graduates	Hanumant Nirani	BJP	5-Jul-2022	4-Jul-2028
4	Karnataka South Graduates	Madhu Madhe Gowda	INC	5-Jul-2022	4-Jul-2028
5	Karnataka West Graduates	S. V. Sankanura	BJP	10-Nov-2020	9-Nov-2026
6	Bangalore Graduates	Dr. Ramoji Gowda	INC	22-Jun-2024	21-Jun-2030
7	Karnataka South-West Graduates	Dhananjaya Sarji	BJP	22-Jun-2024	21-Jun-2030
Elected by Teachers
1	Karnataka South Teachers	K. Vivekananda	JDS	22-Jun-2024	21-Jun-2030
2	Karnataka South-East Teachers	D. T. Srinivas Yadav	INC	8-Jun-2024	9-Jun-2030
3	Karnataka North-East Teachers	Shashil G. Namoshi	BJP	10-Nov-2020	9-Nov-2026
4	Bangalore Teachers	Puttanna	INC	20-Feb-2024	9-Nov-2026
5	Karnataka West Teachers	Basavaraj Horatti	BJP	5-Jul-2022	4-Jul-2028
6	Karnataka North-West Teachers	Prakash Hukkeri	INC	5-Jul-2022	4-Jul-2028
7	Karnataka South-West Teachers	S. L. Bhojegowda	JDS	22-Jun-2024	21-Jun-2030
Nominated by Governor
1	Nominated	Arathi Krishna	INC	10-Sep-2025	09-Sep-2031
2	Nominated	K Shivakumar	INC	10-Sep-2025	09-Sep-2031
3	Nominated	FH Jakkappanavar	INC	10-Sep-2025	09-Sep-2031
4	Nominated	Umashree	INC	21-Aug-2023	20-Aug-2029
5	Nominated	M. R. Seetharam	INC	21-Aug-2023	20-Aug-2029
6	Nominated	H. P. Sudham Das	INC	21-Aug-2023	20-Aug-2029
7	Nominated	TBD	INC	2026	21-Jul-2032

== Past members ==
- MLA - elected by Members of Karnataka Legislative Assembly
- LA - Local Authorities
- NOM - Nominated

Name	Party		Constituency	Tenure		Term	Notes
D. M. Puttegowda	INC	Chikmagalur LA	6-Jan-2004	5-Jan-2010			
S. M. Anand	INC	Hassan LA	6-Jan-2004	5-Jan-2010			
V. S. Ugrappa	INC	Tumkur LA	6-Jan-2004	5-Jan-2010			
S. M. Shankar	INC	Mandya LA	6-Jan-2004	5-Jan-2010			
Shambulingaiah Ravi	INC	Bangalore Rural LA	6-Jan-2004	5-Jan-2010	1		
K. Naseer Ahmed	INC	Kolar LA	6-Jan-2004	5-Jan-2010	1		
Arun Machaiah	Ind	Kodagu LA	6-Jan-2004	5-Jan-2010		resigned on 17-Apr-2008	
N. Manjunath	INC	Mysore LA	6-Jan-2004	5-Jan-2010			
B. Chidanand	JDS	Mysore LA	6-Jan-2004	5-Jan-2010			
Prof. B. K. Chandrashekhar	INC	MLA	1-Jul-2002	30-Jun-2008	2		
Saleem Ahmed	INC	MLA	1-Jul-2002	30-Jun-2008	2		
D. Madegowda	INC	MLA	1-Jul-2002	30-Jun-2008			
Ashok Kattimani	INC	MLA	1-Jul-2002	30-Jun-2008			
Veerashetty Kusnoor	INC	MLA	1-Jul-2002	30-Jun-2008		resigned on 3-May-2008	
V. S. Acharya	BJP	MLA	1-Jul-2002	30-Jun-2008	2		
Sachidananda Khot	JDU	MLA	1-Jul-2002	30-Jun-2008		joined JDS on 3-Mar-2006	
K. C. Kondaiah	INC	MLA	8-Jun-2002	17-Jun-2006	1	bye - res of M. V. Rajasekharan	
Prabhakar Kore	INC	NOM	21-Jun-2001	20-Jun-2007			
L. Hanumanthaiah	INC	NOM	21-Jun-2001	20-Jun-2007			
B. A. Hasanabba	INC	NOM	21-Jun-2001	20-Jun-2007			
Umashree	INC	NOM	21-Jun-2001	20-Jun-2007			
Ramesh Raju M. D.	INC	NOM	21-Jun-2001	20-Jun-2007			
Niranjan Naidu	INC	Bellary LA	14-May-2001	5-Jan-2004		bye - death of T. S. Mruthunjayappa	
Nirmala	INC	MLA	15-Feb-2001	13-May-2004		bye - death of T. Kempamma	
Kariyanna	INC	MLA	18-Jun-2000	17-Jun-2006			
M. Krishnappa	INC	MLA	18-Jun-2000	17-Jun-2006			
Jalaja Naik	INC	MLA	18-Jun-2000	17-Jun-2006			
Maruthi Rao Male	INC	MLA	18-Jun-2000	17-Jun-2006			
M. V. Rajasekharan	INC	MLA	18-Jun-2000	17-Jun-2006	1	elected to RS Karnataka on 10-Apr-2002	
Nafees Fazal	INC	MLA	18-Jun-2000	17-Jun-2006	2		
Winnifred Fernandes	INC	MLA	18-Jun-2000	17-Jun-2006			
V. R. Sudarshan	INC	MLA	18-Jun-2000	17-Jun-2006	3		
B. S. Yediyurappa	BJP	MLA	18-Jun-2000	17-Jun-2006		elected to Shikaripura on 17-May-2004	
Vimala Gowda	BJP	MLA	18-Jun-2000	17-Jun-2006	1		
M. P. Prakash	JDU	MLA	18-Jun-2000	17-Jun-2006		elected to Hoovina Hadagali on 24-May-2004	
Prof. B. K. Chandrashekhar	INC	MLA	18-Mar-2000	30-Jun-2002	1	bye - death of K. B. Mallikarjun	
Kamalakar Laxman Gokarna	JD	MLA	12-Feb-1999	30-Jun-2002	1	bye - res of Prof. A. Lakshmisagar	
K. H. Srinivas	JD	NOM	28-Jul-1998	27-Jul-2004			
P. Ramaiah	JD	NOM	28-Jul-1998	27-Jul-2004			
S. D. Karpuramath	JD	NOM	28-Jul-1998	27-Jul-2004			
Alkod Hanumanthappa	JD	MLA	14-May-1998	13-May-2004			
Kale Budde Ismail	JD	MLA	14-May-1998	13-May-2004			
M.C. Nanaiah	JD	MLA	14-May-1998	13-May-2004	1		
B. L. Shankar	JD	MLA	14-May-1998	13-May-2004		resigned on 14-Feb-2004	
Rani Satish	INC	MLA	14-May-1998	13-May-2004			
T. Kempamma	INC	MLA	14-May-1998	13-May-2004		expired on 4-Dec-2000	
Mukhyamantri Chandru	BJP	MLA	14-May-1998	13-May-2004	1		
Basavaraj Havagiyappa Patil	INC	Bidar LA	6-Jan-1998	5-Jan-2004	1		
Channareddy Patil Tunnur	INC	Gulbarga LA	6-Jan-1998	5-Jan-2004			
Basagoudappa Gurusiddappa Patil	JD	Bijapur LA	6-Jan-1998	5-Jan-2004			
S. R. Patil	INC	Bijapur LA	6-Jan-1998	5-Jan-2004	1		
Satish Jarkiholi	JD	Belgaum LA	6-Jan-1998	5-Jan-2004	1		
Veerakumar Patil	INC	Belgaum LA	6-Jan-1998	5-Jan-2004	1		
V. D. Hegde	JD	Uttara Kannada LA	6-Jan-1998	5-Jan-2004			
Basavaraj Bommai	JD	Dharwad LA	6-Jan-1998	5-Jan-2004	1		
Abdul Hakim M. Hindasagari	INC	Dharwad LA	6-Jan-1998	5-Jan-2004	1		
Basavaraj Patil Itagi	INC	Raichur LA	6-Jan-1998	5-Jan-2004	1		
T. S. Mruthunjayappa	JD	Bellary LA	6-Jan-1998	5-Jan-2004		expired on 20-Dec-2000	
B. T. Channabasappa	JD	Chitradurga LA	6-Jan-1998	5-Jan-2004	1		
H. S. Shanataveerappa Gowda	BJP	Shimoga LA	6-Jan-1998	5-Jan-2004			
Manoor Vasudev Kamath	INC	Dakshina Kannada LA	6-Jan-1998	5-Jan-2004			
S. V. Manjunath	JD	Chikmagalur LA	6-Jan-1998	5-Jan-2004			
B. V. Karigowda	JD	Hassan LA	6-Jan-1998	5-Jan-2004			
K. N. Rajanna	INC	Tumkur LA	6-Jan-1998	5-Jan-2004			
H. Honappa	JD	Mandya LA	6-Jan-1998	5-Jan-2004			
C. Boraiah	JD	Bangalore Rural LA	6-Jan-1998	5-Jan-2004			
K. V. Subba Reddy	JD	Kolar LA	6-Jan-1998	5-Jan-2004			
T. John	INC	Kodagu LA	6-Jan-1998	5-Jan-2004	1		
Y. Mahesh	JD	Mysore LA	6-Jan-1998	5-Jan-2004			
C. Ramesh	INC	Mysore LA	6-Jan-1998	5-Jan-2004			
K. B. Shanappa	JD	NOM	5-Dec-1996	4-Dec-2002	1		
M. S. Siddaraju	JD	NOM	5-Dec-1996	4-Dec-2002			
David Simeon	JD	NOM	5-Dec-1996	4-Dec-2002			
Prafulla Madhukar	JD	MLA	1-Jul-1996	30-Jun-2002			
D. L. Jagadeesh	JD	MLA	1-Jul-1996	30-Jun-2002			
B. A. Mohiddin	JD	MLA	1-Jul-1996	30-Jun-2002			
K. B. Mallikarjun	JD	MLA	1-Jul-1996	30-Jun-2002		expired on 28-Oct-1999	
Prof. A. Lakshmisagar	JD	MLA	1-Jul-1996	30-Jun-2002		resigned on 25-Apr-1998	
Saleem Ahmed	INC	MLA	1-Jul-1996	30-Jun-2002	1		
V. S. Acharya	BJP	MLA	1-Jul-1996	30-Jun-2002	1		
V. S. Ugrappa	JD	NOM	27-Nov-1995	27-Jul-1998		bye -	
Siddalingaiah	JD	NOM	12-May-1995	11-May-2001			
H. L. Nagegowda	JD	NOM	12-May-1995	11-May-2001			
Mahadev Banakar	JD	NOM	12-May-1995	11-May-2001			
Saritha Kusumakar Desai	JD	NOM	12-May-1995	11-May-2001			
Yejasuddin	JD	NOM	12-May-1995	11-May-2001			
Abhayachandra Jain	INC	MLA	18-Jun-1994	17-Jun-2000		elected to Moodabidri in Oct-1999	
K. Mallanna	INC	MLA	18-Jun-1994	17-Jun-2000			
Jiddi Shivaraya Adiveppa	INC	MLA	18-Jun-1994	17-Jun-2000			
Nafees Fazal	INC	MLA	18-Jun-1994	17-Jun-2000	1		
Marilinge Gowda	INC	MLA	18-Jun-1994	17-Jun-2000			
V. R. Sudarshan	INC	MLA	18-Jun-1994	17-Jun-2000	2		
T. N. Narasimha Murthy	INC	MLA	18-Jun-1994	17-Jun-2000			
Bheemanna Khandre	INC	MLA	18-Jun-1994	17-Jun-2000			
Digambar Rao	INC	MLA	18-Jun-1994	17-Jun-2000			
N. C. Madhuraj	INC	MLA	18-Jun-1994	17-Jun-2000		expired on 13-Nov-1998	
N. Thipanna	JD	MLA	18-Jun-1994	17-Jun-2000	1		
M. Shivanna	INC	MLA	9-Jun-1978	1982	1	By-election	

== Members elected by Legislative Assembly ==
Name	Party	Tenure		Term
Jagadish Shettar	INC	23 June 2023	4 June 2024	1
Baburao Chinchansur	BJP	5 August 2022	21 March 2023	1
Laxman Savadi	BJP	14 June 2022	10 May 2023	2
Laxman Savadi	BJP	17 February 2020	13 June 2022	2
P. Muniraju Gowda	BJP	15 March 2021	17 June 2024	1
Sunil Vallyapure	BJP	1 July 2020	30 June 2026	1
Pratap Simha Nayak	BJP	1 July 2020	30 June 2026	1
M. T. B. Nagaraj	BJP	1 July 2020	30 June 2026	1
R. Shankar	BJP	1 July 2020	30 June 2026	1
K. Naseer Ahmed	INC	1 July 2020	30 June 2026	2
K. Naseer Ahmed	INC	27 September 2018	30 June 2020	2
Govindaraju	JD(S)	1 July 2020	30 June 2026	1
Tejashwini Gowda	BJP	18 June 2018	17 June 2024	1
K. P. Nanjundi	BJP	18 June 2018	17 June 2024	1
S. Rudregowda	BJP	18 June 2018	17 June 2024	1
N. Ravikumar	BJP	18 June 2018	17 June 2024	1
Raghunath Rao Malkapure	BJP	18 June 2018	17 June 2024	2
Raghunath Rao Malkapure	BJP	18 June 2012	17 June 2018	2
H. M. Ramesh Gowda	JD(S)	27 September 2018	13 June 2022	1
M. C. Venugopal	INC	27 September 2018	30 June 2020	1
K. Harishkumar	INC	18 June 2018	17 June 2024	1
Aravind Kumar Arali	INC	18 June 2018	17 June 2024	1
C. M. Ibrahim	INC	18 June 2018	5 August 2022	2
C. M. Ibrahim	INC	22 August 2017	17 June 2018	2
B. M. Farooq	JD(S)	18 June 2018	17 June 2024	1
S. L. Dharmegowda	JD(S)	18 June 2018	28 December 2020	1
V. Somanna	BJP	14 June 2016	15 May 2018	2
V. Somanna	BJP	14 June 2010	13 June 2016	2
Lehar Singh Siroya	BJP	14 June 2016	13 June 2022	1
Ramappa Timmapur	INC	14 June 2016	13 June 2022	1
Allum Veerabhadrappa	INC	14 June 2016	13 June 2022	1
Veena Achaiah	INC	14 June 2016	13 June 2022	1
Rizwan Arshad	INC	14 June 2016	5 December 2019	1
K. V. Narayana Swamy	JD(S)	14 June 2016	13 June 2022	1
Jayamala	INC	1 July 2014	30 June 2020	1
H M Revanna	INC	1 July 2014	30 June 2020	1
G. Parameshwara	INC	1 July 2014	15 May 2018	1
T. A. Sharavana	JD(S)	1 July 2014	30 June 2020	1
Dr. U. Mallikarjun	Independent	1 July 2014	30 June 2020	1
K. S. Eshwarappa	BJP	1 July 2014	15 May 2018	1
B. J. Puttaswamy	BJP	18 June 2012	17 June 2018	1
D. S. Veeraiah	BJP	18 June 2012	17 June 2018	1
Somanna Bevinamarada	BJP	18 June 2012	17 June 2018	1
Bhanu Prakash Avadhani	BJP	18 June 2012	17 June 2018	1
Vimala Gowda	BJP	18 June 2012	17 April 2017	2
Vimala Gowda	BJP	18 June 2006	17 June 2012	2
Monappa Bhandari	BJP	14 July 2012	30 June 2014	1
Syed Mudeer Aga	JD(S)	18 June 2012	17 June 2018	1
Byrathi Suresh	INC	18 June 2012	17 June 2018	1
M. R. Seetharam	INC	18 June 2012	17 June 2018	1
Motamma	INC	18 June 2012	17 June 2018	2
Motamma	INC	18 June 2006	17 June 2012	2
Sadananda Gowda	BJP	22 December 2011	30 June 2014	1
Ashwath Narayan	BJP	15 June 2010	14 June 2016	1
C. H. Vijayashankar	BJP	15 June 2010	14 June 2016	1
Narayana Bhandage	BJP	15 June 2010	14 June 2016	1
Mattikati Veeranna	INC	15 June 2010	14 June 2016	2
Mattikati Veeranna	INC	15 June 2004	14 June 2010	2
R. V. Venkatesh	INC	15 June 2010	14 June 2016	1
M. Srinivas	JD(S)	15 June 2010	14 June 2016	2
M. Srinivas	JD(S)	15 June 2004	14 June 2010	2
S. Kailash	BJP	3 December 2008	14 June 2010	1
G. M. Madhu	BJP	3 December 2008	14 June 2010	1
Siddaraju	BJP	1 July 2008	30 June 2014	1
Bharathi Shetty	BJP	1 July 2008	30 June 2014	1
V. S. Acharya	BJP	1 July 2008	14 February 2012	1
N. Shankarappa	BJP	1 July 2008	14 October 2011	1
M. V. Rajasekharan	INC	1 July 2008	30 June 2014	1
K. V. Narayana Swamy	JD(S)	1 July 2008	30 June 2014	1
M.C. Nanaiah	JD(S)	1 July 2008	30 June 2014	1
G. Janardhana Reddy	BJP	18 June 2006	17 June 2012	1
Thontadarya	BJP	18 June 2006	17 June 2012	1
D. S. Veeraiah	BJP	18 June 2006	17 June 2012	1
K. C. Kondaiah	INC	18 June 2006	17 June 2012	1
Qazi Arshad Ali	INC	18 June 2006	17 June 2012	1
V. R. Sudarshan	INC	18 June 2006	17 June 2012	1
Abdul Azeem	JD(S)	18 June 2006	17 June 2012	1
S. Chikkamadu	JD(S)	18 June 2006	17 June 2012	1
H. C. Neeravari	JD(S)	18 June 2006	17 June 2012	1
R. V. Venkatesh	INC	14 July 2005	14 June 2010	1
Qazi Arshad Ali	INC	30 October 2004	17 June 2006	1
Vittal	JD(S)	30 October 2004	17 June 2006	1
Shobha Karandlaje	BJP	15 June 2004	27 May 2008	1
Arvind Limbavali	BJP	15 June 2004	27 May 2008	1
Mukhyamantri Chandru	BJP	15 June 2004	14 June 2010	2
R. V. Devraj	INC	15 June 2004	16 May 2005	1
B. R. Gurudev	JD(S)	15 June 2004	21 January 2010	1

== Members elected by Local Authorities constituencies ==
Constituency	Name	Party	Tenure		Term
Bidar	Vijay Singh	INC	6 January 2016	5 January 2022	1
Bidar	Basavaraj Havagiyappa Patil	BJP	6 January 2010	5 January 2016	3
Bidar	Basavaraj Havagiyappa Patil	INC	6 January 2004	5 January 2010	3
Bidar	Basavaraj Havagiyappa Patil	INC	6 January 1998	5 January 2004	3
Kalaburagi–Yadgir	B. J. Patil	BJP	6 January 2016	5 January 2022	1
Kalaburagi–Yadgir	Allam Prabhu Patil	INC	6 January 2010	5 January 2016	1
Kalaburagi–Yadgir	Amatheppa Kandakoor	INC	6 January 2004	5 January 2010	1
Bijapur–Bagalkot	Sunil Gouda Patil	INC	11 September 2018	5 January 2022	1
Bijapur–Bagalkot	Basangouda Patil Yatnal	Independent	6 January 2016	15 May 2018	1
Bijapur–Bagalkot	G. S. Nyamgouda	BJP	6 January 2010	5 January 2016	1
Bijapur–Bagalkot	Siddu Nyamagouda	INC	6 January 2004	5 January 2010	1
Bijapur–Bagalkot	S. R. Patil	INC	6 January 2016	5 January 2022	4
Bijapur–Bagalkot	S. R. Patil	INC	6 January 2010	5 January 2016	4
Bijapur–Bagalkot	S. R. Patil	INC	6 January 2004	5 January 2010	4
Bijapur–Bagalkot	S. R. Patil	INC	6 January 1998	5 January 2004	4
Belgaum	Mahantesh Kavatagimath	BJP	6 January 2016	5 January 2022	2
Belgaum	Mahantesh Kavatagimath	BJP	6 January 2010	5 January 2016	2
Belgaum	Shashikanth Akkappa Naik	BJP	4 November 2008	5 January 2010	1
Belgaum	Satish Jarkiholi	JD(S)	6 January 2004	23 May 2008	2
Belgaum	Satish Jarkiholi	JD	6 January 1998	5 January 2004	2
Belgaum	Vivekrao Vasanthrao Patil	Independent	6 January 2016	5 January 2022	1
Belgaum	Veerakumar Patil	INC	6 January 2010	5 January 2016	3
Belgaum	Veerakumar Patil	INC	6 January 2004	5 January 2010	3
Belgaum	Veerakumar Patil	INC	6 January 1998	5 January 2004	3
Uttara Kannada	Shrikant Laxman Gotnekar	INC	6 January 2016	5 January 2022	2
Uttara Kannada	Shrikant Laxman Gotnekar	INC	6 January 2010	5 January 2016	2
Uttara Kannada	Shubha Latha Asnotikar	INC	6 January 2004	5 January 2010	1
Dharwad–Gadag–Haveri	Srinivas Mane	INC	6 January 2016	2 November 2021	2
Dharwad–Gadag–Haveri	Srinivas Mane	INC	6 January 2010	5 January 2016	2
Dharwad–Gadag–Haveri	Abdul Hakim M. Hindasagari	INC	6 January 2004	5 January 2010	2
Dharwad–Gadag–Haveri	Abdul Hakim M. Hindasagari	INC	6 January 1998	5 January 2004	2
Dharwad–Gadag–Haveri	Pradeep Shettar	BJP	6 January 2016	5 January 2022	1
Dharwad–Gadag–Haveri	Nagaraj Chabbi	INC	26 August 2013	5 January 2016	1
Dharwad–Gadag–Haveri	Shivaraj Sajjanar	BJP	6 January 2010	5 April 2013	2
Dharwad–Gadag–Haveri	Shivaraj Sajjanar	BJP	4 November 2008	5 January 2010	2
Dharwad–Gadag–Haveri	Basavaraj Bommai	JD(U)	6 January 2004	17 April 2008	2
Dharwad–Gadag–Haveri	Basavaraj Bommai	JD	6 January 1998	5 January 2004	2
Raichur–Koppal	Basavaraj Patil Itagi	INC	6 January 2016	5 January 2022	1
Raichur–Koppal	Halappa Achar	BJP	6 January 2010	5 January 2016	1
Raichur–Koppal	H. R. Srinath	INC	6 January 2004	5 January 2010	1
Bellary–Vijaynagar	K. C. Kondaiah	INC	6 January 2016	5 January 2022	1
Bellary–Vijaynagar	Mruthunjaya Jinaga	BJP	6 January 2010	5 January 2016	1
Bellary–Vijaynagar	K. S. L. Swamy	INC	6 January 2004	5 January 2010	1
Chitradurga–Davangere	G. Raghu Achar	INC	6 January 2016	5 January 2022	2
Chitradurga–Davangere	G. Raghu Achar	Independent	26 August 2013	5 January 2016	2
Chitradurga–Davangere	G. H. Thippareddy	BJP	6 January 2010	8 May 2013	1
Chitradurga–Davangere	B. T. Channabasappa	JD(U)	6 January 2004	16 April 2009	2
Chitradurga–Davangere	B. T. Channabasappa	JD	6 January 1998	5 January 2004	2
Shivamogga	Prassana Kumar	INC	6 January 2016	5 January 2022	1
Shivamogga	R. K. Siddaramanna	BJP	6 January 2010	5 January 2016	1
Shivamogga	Mir Azeez Ahmed	INC	6 January 2004	5 January 2010	1
Dakshina Kannada–Udupi	Kota Srinivas Poojary	BJP	6 January 2022	4 June 2024	4
Dakshina Kannada–Udupi	Kota Srinivas Poojary	BJP	6 January 2016	5 January 2022	4
Dakshina Kannada–Udupi	Kota Srinivas Poojary	BJP	6 January 2010	5 January 2016	4
Dakshina Kannada–Udupi	Kota Srinivas Poojary	BJP	26 June 2008	5 January 2010	4
Dakshina Kannada–Udupi	Blasius D'Souza	INC	6 January 2004	26 January 2008	1
Dakshina Kannada–Udupi	K. Prathapachandra Shetty	INC	6 January 2016	5 January 2022	3
Dakshina Kannada–Udupi	K. Prathapachandra Shetty	INC	6 January 2010	5 January 2016	3
Dakshina Kannada–Udupi	K. Prathapachandra Shetty	INC	6 January 2004	5 January 2010	3
Dakshina Kannada–Udupi	Anna Vinayachandra	BJP	6 January 1998	5 January 2004	1
Chikmagaluru	M. K. Pranesh	BJP	6 January 2022	15 July 2026	2
Chikmagaluru	M. K. Pranesh	BJP	6 January 2016	5 January 2022	2
Chikmagaluru	A. V. Gayatri Shanthegowda	INC	6 January 2010	5 January 2016	1
Hassan	Gopalaswamy	INC	6 January 2016	5 January 2022	1
Hassan	Shivaram Patel	JD(S)	6 January 2010	5 January 2016	1
Tumakuru	Kanthraj	JD(S)	6 January 2016	5 January 2022	1
Tumakuru	M. R. Hulinaykar	JD(S)	6 January 2010	5 January 2016	1
Mandya	N. Appaji Gowda	JD(S)	6 January 2016	5 January 2022	1
Mandya	B. Ramakrishna	JD(S)	6 January 2010	5 January 2016	1
Bengaluru Urban	M Narayanaswamy	INC	6 January 2016	5 January 2022	1
Bengaluru Urban	Dayananda	INC	6 January 2010	5 January 2016	1
Bengaluru Urban	Munivenkata Reddy	INC	6 January 2004	5 January 2010	2
Bengaluru Urban	Munivenkata Reddy	INC	27 August 2001	5 January 2004	2
Bengaluru Urban	C. Narayana Reddy	INC	6 January 1998	1 May 2000	1
Bengaluru Rural–Ramanagar	Shambulingaiah Ravi	INC	6 January 2016	5 January 2022	1
Bengaluru Rural–Ramanagar	E Krishnappa	JD(S)	6 January 2010	5 January 2016	1
Kolar–Chikkaballapur	C. R. Manohar	JD(S)	6 January 2016	5 January 2022	1
Kolar–Chikkaballapur	Naseer Ahmed	INC	6 January 2010	5 January 2016	1
Kodagu	Sunil Subramani Mandepada	BJP	6 January 2016	5 January 2022	1
Kodagu	T. John	INC	6 January 2010	5 January 2016	1
Kodagu	S. G. Medappa	BJP	4 November 2008	5 January 2010	1
Mysuru–Chamarajanagara	Sandesh Nagraju	JD(S)	6 January 2016	5 January 2022	2
Mysuru–Chamarajanagara	Sandesh Nagraju	JD(S)	6 January 2010	5 January 2016	2
Mysuru–Chamarajanagara	Dharmasena	INC	6 January 2016	5 January 2022	2
Mysuru–Chamarajanagara	Dharmasena	INC	26 August 2013	5 January 2016	2
Mysuru–Chamarajanagara	Prof K.R.Mallikarjunappa	BJP	6 January 2010	March 2013	1

== Members Elected from Graduates constituencies ==
Constituency	Name	Party	Tenure		Term
Bangalore Graduates	A. Devegowda	BJP	22 June 2018	21 June 2024	1
Bangalore Graduates	Ramachandra Gowda	BJP	22 June 1988	21 June 2018	5
Karnataka North-East Graduates	Chandrashekhar B. Patil	INC	22 June 2018	21 June 2024	1
Karnataka North-East Graduates	N. Amarnath Patil	BJP	22 June 2012	21 June 2018	1
Karnataka North-East Graduates	Manohara Maski	BJP	22 June 2006	21 June 2012	1
Karnataka North-East Graduates	M. R. Tanga	BJP	22 June 1988	21 June 2006	3
Karnataka North-West Graduates	Hanumant Nirani	BJP	5 July 2016	4 July 2022	1
Karnataka North-West Graduates	Mahantesh Koujalagi	INC	5 July 2010	4 July 2016	1
Karnataka North-West Graduates	M. P. Nadagouda	JD(U)	1 July 2004	30 June 2010	2
Karnataka North-West Graduates	M. P. Nadagouda	JD	1 July 1998	30 June 2004	2
Karnataka South Graduates	K. T. Srikante Gowda	JD(S)	5 July 2016	4 July 2022	1
Karnataka South Graduates	Go Madhusudana	BJP	5 July 2010	4 July 2016	3
Karnataka South Graduates	K. T. Srikante Gowda	JD(S)	5 July 2004	4 July 2010	1
Karnataka South Graduates	Go Madhusudana	BJP	1 July 1998	30 June 2004	1
Karnataka South Graduates	Go Madhusudana	BJP	12 February 1997	30 June 1998	1
Karnataka South Graduates	B. R. Krishnamurthy	BJP	1 July 1992	17 February 1996	1
Karnataka South-East Graduates	R. Chowda Reddy Thoopalli	JD(S)	1 July 2014	30 June 2020	1
Karnataka South-East Graduates	A. H. Shivayogiswamy	BJP	1 July 2008	30 June 2014	1
Karnataka South-East Graduates	H. S. Shivashankar	JD(U)	1 July 2002	30 June 2008	1
Karnataka South-East Graduates	A. H. Shivayogiswamy	BJP	1 July 1996	30 June 2002	1
Karnataka South-West Graduates	Ayanur Manjunath	BJP	22 June 2018	21 June 2024	1
Karnataka South-West Graduates	D. H. Shankaramurthy	BJP	22 June 2012	21 June 2018	5
Karnataka South-West Graduates	D. H. Shankaramurthy	BJP	22 June 2006	21 June 2012	5
Karnataka South-West Graduates	D. H. Shankaramurthy	BJP	22 June 2000	21 June 2006	5
Karnataka South-West Graduates	D. H. Shankaramurthy	BJP	22 June 1994	21 June 2000	5
Karnataka South-West Graduates	D. H. Shankaramurthy	BJP	22 June 1988	21 June 1994	5
Karnataka West Graduates	S. V. Sankanur	BJP	1 July 2014	30 June 2020	1
Karnataka West Graduates	Mohan Limbikai	BJP	1 July 2008	30 June 2014	1
Karnataka West Graduates	H. K. Patil	INC	1 July 2002	30 June 2008	4
Karnataka West Graduates	H. K. Patil	INC	1 July 1996	30 June 2002	4
Karnataka West Graduates	H. K. Patil	INC	1 July 1990	30 June 1996	4
Karnataka West Graduates	H. K. Patil	INC	1 July 1984	30 June 1990	4

== Members Elected from Teachers constituencies ==
Constituency	Name	Party	Tenure		Term
Karnataka South Teachers	Maritibbe Gowda	JD(S)	22 June 2018	21 June 2024	4
Karnataka South Teachers	Maritibbe Gowda	JD(S)	22 June 2012	21 June 2018	4
Karnataka South Teachers	Maritibbe Gowda	Independent	22 June 2006	21 June 2012	4
Karnataka South Teachers	Maritibbe Gowda	INC	22 June 2000	21 June 2006	4
Karnataka South Teachers	K. S. Sachidananda	JD	22 June 1994	21 June 2000	1
Karnataka South-East Teachers	Y. A. Narayanaswamy	BJP	22 June 2018	21 June 2024	1
Karnataka South-East Teachers	Ramesh Babu	JD(S)	7 February 2017	21 June 2018	1
Karnataka South-East Teachers	Y. A. Narayanaswamy	BJP	22 June 2012	17 February 2016	1
Karnataka South-East Teachers	Y. A. Narayanaswamy	Independent	22 June 2006	21 June 2012	1
Karnataka South-East Teachers	S Channabasavaiah	JD(U)	22 June 2000	4 September 2005	1
Karnataka South-East Teachers	K. C. Puttasidda Shetty	Independent	22 June 1994	21 June 2000	1
Karnataka North-East Teachers	Sharanappa Mattur	INC	1 July 2014	30 June 2020	1
Karnataka North-East Teachers	Shashil G. Namoshi	BJP	1 July 2008	30 June 2014	3
Karnataka North-East Teachers	Shashil G. Namoshi	BJP	1 July 2002	30 June 2008	3
Karnataka North-East Teachers	Shashil G. Namoshi	BJP	1 July 1996	30 June 2002	3
Bangalore Teachers	Puttanna	INC	20 February 2024	9 November 2026	5
Bangalore Teachers	Puttanna	BJP	10 November 2020	9 March 2023	5
Bangalore Teachers	Puttanna	JD(S)	1 July 2014	30 June 2020	5
Bangalore Teachers	Puttanna	JD(S)	1 July 2008	30 June 2014	5
Bangalore Teachers	Puttanna	JD(S)	1 July 2002	30 June 2008	5
Bangalore Teachers	K. Narahari	BJP	1 July 1996	30 June 2002	1
Karnataka West Teachers	Basavaraj Horatti	JD(S)	5 July 2016	4 July 2022	7
Karnataka West Teachers	Basavaraj Horatti	JD(S)	5 July 2010	4 July 2016	7
Karnataka West Teachers	Basavaraj Horatti	JD(S)	1 July 2004	30 June 2010	7
Karnataka West Teachers	Basavaraj Horatti	JD	1 July 1998	30 June 2004	7
Karnataka West Teachers	Basavaraj Horatti	JD	1 July 1992	30 June 1998	7
Karnataka West Teachers	Basavaraj Horatti	JP	1 July 1986	30 June 1992	7
Karnataka West Teachers	Basavaraj Horatti	Independent	1 July 1980	30 June 1986	7
Karnataka North-West Teachers	Arun Shahapur	BJP	5 July 2016	4 July 2022	2
Karnataka North-West Teachers	Arun Shahapur	BJP	5 July 2010	4 July 2016	2
Karnataka North-West Teachers	G. K. Patil	Independent	1 July 2004	30 June 2010	1
Karnataka North-West Teachers	Shrikant Sidappa Pujari	Independent	1 July 1998	30 June 2004	1
Karnataka South-West Teachers	S. L. Bhojegowda	JD(S)	22 June 2018	21 June 2024	1
Karnataka South-West Teachers	Ganesh Karnik	BJP	22 June 2012	21 June 2018	2
Karnataka South-West Teachers	Ganesh Karnik	BJP	22 June 2006	21 June 2012	2
Karnataka South-West Teachers	K. Balakrishna Bhat	BJP	22 June 2000	21 June 2006	2
Karnataka South-West Teachers	K. Balakrishna Bhat	BJP	22 June 1994	21 June 2000	2

== Members nominated by Governor ==
Name	Party	Tenure		Term
Ramesh Babu	INC	10 September 2025	21 July 2026	1
Adagur H. Vishwanath	BJP	22 July 2020	21 July 2026	1
Shantaram Siddi	BJP	22 July 2020	21 July 2026	1
Bharathi Shetty	BJP	22 July 2020	21 July 2026	2
Talwar Sabanna	BJP	22 July 2020	21 July 2026	1
C. P. Yogeeshwara	BJP	22 July 2020	23 November 2024	1
K. A. Thippeswamy	JD(S)	28 January 2019	27 January 2025	1
Prakash Rathod	INC	30 October 2018	29 October 2024	2
Prakash Rathod	INC	21 January 2004	20 January 2010	2
U. B. Venkatesh	INC	30 October 2018	29 October 2024	1
C. M. Lingappa	INC	9 June 2017	8 June 2023	1
P. R. Ramesh Kumar	INC	18 May 2017	17 May 2023	1
Mohan Kumar Kondajji	INC	18 May 2017	17 May 2023	1
Jayamala	INC	24 June 2014	23 June 2020	1
Iqbal Ahmed Saradgi	INC	24 June 2014	23 June 2020	1
Abdul Jabbar Khan	INC	24 June 2014	23 June 2020	1
Ivan D'Souza	INC	24 June 2014	23 June 2020	
V. S. Ugrappa	INC	24 June 2014	6 November 2018	
B. B. Shivappa	BJP	19 March 2013	20 June 2014	2
K. B. Shanappa	BJP	10 August 2012	9 August 2018	2
Tara Anuradha	BJP	10 August 2012	9 August 2018	1
M. D. Lakshminarayana	Independent	10 August 2012	9 August 2018	1 joined INC on 19-Mar-2014
Lehar Singh Siroya	BJP	29 May 2010	28 May 2016	1
N.Thippanna	BJP	29 May 2010	20 May 2012	2
N.Thippanna	JD(S)	21 May 2006	21 January 2010	2
Prof P. V. Krishna Bhatta	BJP	4 February 2010	3 February 2016	1
Jaggesh	BJP	4 February 2010	3 February 2016	1
Mumtaz Ali Khan	BJP	21 June 2008	27 September 2013	1
Vijay Sankeshwar	BJP	21 June 2008	11 December 2012	1
S. R. Leela	BJP	21 June 2008	20 June 2014	1
Doddarangegowda	BJP	21 June 2008	20 June 2014	1
Prof M. R. Doreswamy	BJP	21 June 2008	20 June 2014	1
Srinath	BJP	21 May 2006	20 May 2012	1
Y. S. V. Datta	JD(S)	21 May 2006	20 May 2012	1
Mallajamma	INC	21 January 2004	20 January 2010	1
Chandrashekhara Kambara	INC	21 January 2004	20 January 2010	1
