= 2004 Indian general election in Karnataka =

Indian general election in Karnataka, 2004
- April–May 2004

28 seats

	First party	Second party
Party	BJP	INC
Alliance	NDA	INC+ (post poll UPA)
Seats won	18	8
Seat change	▲11	▼10
	Third party
Party	JD(S)
Seats won	2
Seat change	▲2
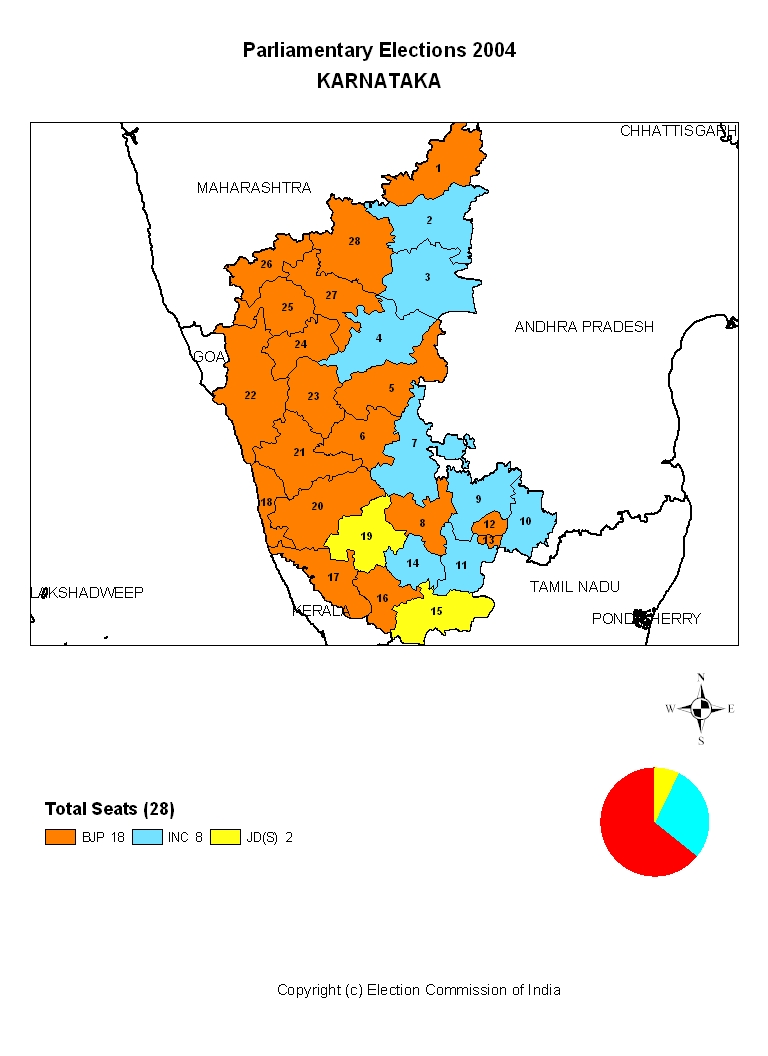
- Results of the election Karnataka
Prime Minister before election
A. B. Vajpayee
BJP
Prime Minister after election
Manmohan Singh
INC

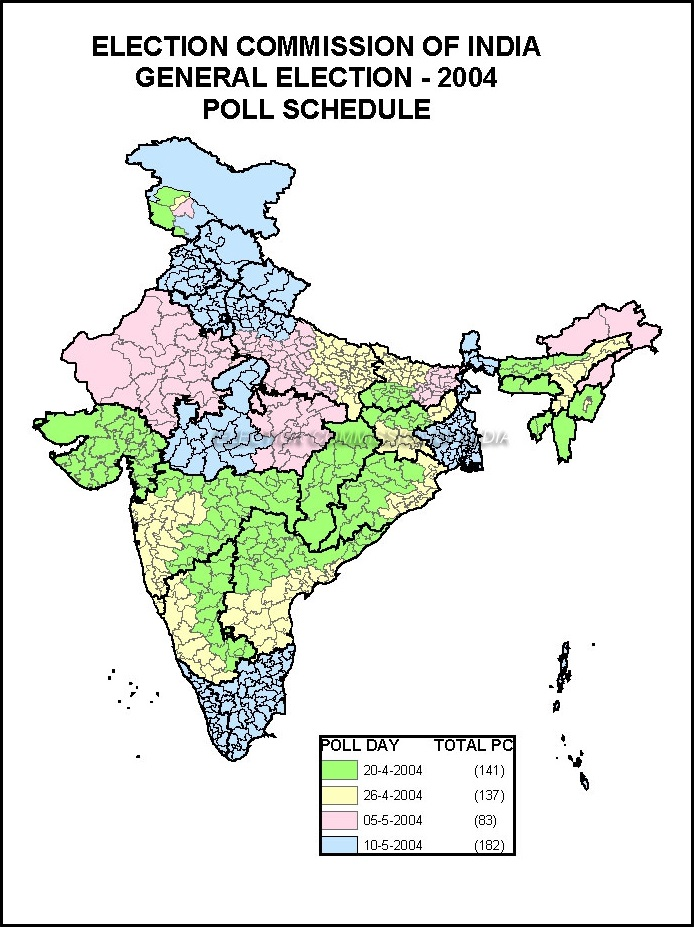
Polling dates

Results

The 2004 Indian general election in Karnataka, occurred for 28 seats in the state. Of the 28 seats, 24 belonged to the general category and 4 were belonging to SC category.

== Schedule ==
The schedule of the election was announced by the Election Commission of India on 29 February 2004.

Poll event	Phase	
Poll event	1	2
Date of announcement	29 February 2004	
Notification date	24 March 2004	31 March 2004
Last date for filing nomination	31 March 2004	7 April 2004
Scrutiny of nomination	2 April 2004	8 April 2004
Last date for withdrawal of nomination	5 April 2004	10 April 2004
Date of poll	20 April 2004	26 April 2004
Date of counting of votes	13 May 2004	
No. of constituencies	15	13

== Parties and alliances ==
Party/Alliance		Flag	Electoral symbol	Leader	Seats contested
NDA	Bharatiya Janata Party			B. S. Yediyurappa	24
NDA	Janata Dal (United)				4
Indian National Congress				S. M. Krishna	28
Janata Dal (Secular)				H. D. Deve Gowda	28

== List of Candidates ==
Constituency		NDA		INC		JD(S)	
#	Name	Party	Candidate	Party	Candidate	Party	Candidate
1	Bidar (SC)	BJP	Ramchandra Veerappa	INC	Suryawanshi Narsingrao	JD(S)	Motiram Chowdhary
2	Gulbarga	BJP	Basavaraj Patil Sedam	INC	Iqbal Ahmed Saradgi	JD(S)	Vithal Heroor
3	Raichur	BJP	Kallur Sureshreddy	INC	Venkatesh Nayak	JD(S)	R. Madangopal Nayak
4	Koppal	BJP	N. Bheemappa Saloni	INC	K. Virupaxappa	JD(S)	Sanganna Agadi
5	Bellary	BJP	G. Karunakara Reddy	INC	K. C. Kondaiah	JD(S)	B. Gulagi Nagaraj
6	Davangere	BJP	G. M. Siddeshwara	INC	S. S. Mallikarjun	JD(S)	Channaiah Odeyar
7	Chitradurga	BJP	C. P. Mudalagiriyappa	INC	N. Y. Hanumanthappa	JD(S)	P. Kodandaramaiah
8	Tumkur	BJP	S. Mallikarjunaiah	INC	G. S. Basavaraj	JD(S)	D. L. Jagadeesh
9	Chikballapur	JD(U)	Ashok Krishnappa	INC	R. L. Jalappa	JD(S)	Shashi Kumar
10	Kolar (SC)	BJP	D. S. Veeraiah	INC	K. H. Muniyappa	JD(S)	S. L. Gangadharappa
11	Kanakapura	BJP	Ramachandra Gowda	INC	Tejashwini See Ramesh	JD(S)	H. D. Devegowda
12	Bangalore North	BJP	H. T. Sangliana	INC	C. K. Jaffer Sharief	JD(S)	C. M. Ibrahim
13	Bangalore South	BJP	Ananth Kumar	INC	M. Krishnappa	JD(S)	Jayanthi
14	Mandya	JD(U)	K. S. Jayaram	INC	M. H. Ambareesh	JD(S)	Dr. S. Ramegowda
15	Chamarajanagar (SC)	JD(U)	N. Chamaraju	INC	A. Siddaraju	JD(S)	M. Shivanna
16	Mysore	BJP	C. H. Vijayashankar	INC	S. N. Wadiyar	JD(S)	A. S. Guruswamy
17	Mangalore	BJP	D. V. Sadananda Gowda	INC	M. Veerappa Moily	JD(S)	A. K. Subbaiah
18	Udupi	BJP	Manorama Madhwaraj	INC	Vinay Kumar Sorake	JD(S)	Taranatha Kodavoor
19	Hassan	JD(U)	H. N. Nanje Gowda	INC	H. C. Srikantaiah	JD(S)	H. D. Devegowda
20	Chikmagalur	BJP	D. C. Srikantappa	INC	B. L. Shankar	JD(S)	Taradevi Siddhartha
21	Shimoga	BJP	S. Bangarappa	INC	Ayanur Manjunath	JD(S)	G. Madappa
22	Kanara	BJP	Ananthkumar Hegde	INC	Margaret Alva	JD(S)	G. Devaraya Naik
23	Dharwad South	BJP	Manjunath Kunnur	INC	I.G. Sanadi	JD(S)	Prema Sanganabasana
24	Dharwad North	BJP	Pralhad Joshi	INC	B. S. Patil	JD(S)	Shagoti Chikkappa
25	Belgaum	BJP	Suresh Angadi	INC	Amarsinh Vasantrao Patil	JD(S)	Jameelahamed Reza
26	Chikkodi (SC)	BJP	Ramesh Jigajinagi	INC	S. B. Ghatage	JD(S)	Shivabal Khokate
27	Bagalkot	BJP	P. C. Gaddigoudar	INC	S. R. Patil	JD(S)	S. D. Siddappa
28	Bijapur	BJP	Basangouda Yatnal	INC	B. Somanagouda Patil	JD(S)	K. N. Siddappa

== Results ==
Alliance/ Party		Popular vote			Seats		
Alliance/ Party		Votes	%	±pp	Contested	Won	+/−
NDA	BJP	87,32,783	34.77	▲7.58	24	18	▲11
NDA	JD(U)	4,68,682	1.87	▼11.41	4	0	▼3
NDA	Total	92,01,465	36.64	Steady	28	18	Steady
INC		92,47,605	36.82	▼8.59	28	8	▼10
JD(S)		51,35,205	20.45	▲9.60	28	2	▲2
Others		15,30,384	6.09	Steady	48	0	Steady
IND		5,88,117	2.34	▲0.53	40	0	Steady
Total		2,51,14,659	100%	-	172	28	-

== Results by Constituency ==
Constituency		Winner				Runner Up				Margin	%
#	Name	Candidate	Party	Votes	%	Candidate	Party	Votes	%	Margin	%
1	Bidar (SC)	Ramchandra Veerappa	BJP	312,838	38.35	Narsingrao Hulla	INC	289,217	35.45	23,621	2.90
2	Gulbarga	Iqbal Ahmed Saradgi	INC	312,601	37.76	Basavaraj Patil Sedam	BJP	255,130	30.82	57,471	6.94
3	Raichur	Venkatesh Nayak	INC	289,424	35.08	Raja M. Nayak	JD(S)	288,916	35.02	508	0.06
4	Koppal	K. Virupaxappa	INC	356,158	39.84	Nagappa B. Saloni	BJP	312,535	34.96	43,623	4.88
5	Bellary	G. Karunakara Reddy	BJP	318,978	33.57	K. C. Kondaiah	INC	287,299	30.23	31,679	3.33
6	Davangere	G. M. Siddeshwara	BJP	370,499	40.70	S. S. Mallikarjun	INC	337,823	37.11	32,676	3.59
7	Chitradurga	N. Y. Hanumanthappa	INC	322,609	35.11	P. Kodandaramaiah	JD(S)	285,149	31.03	37,460	4.08
8	Tumkur	S. Mallikarjunaiah	BJP	303,016	35.08	D. L. Jagadeesh	JD(S)	300,665	34.81	2,351	0.27
9	Chikballapur	R. L. Jalappa	INC	376,204	40.40	Shashi Kumar	JD(S)	316,182	33.96	60,022	6.45
10	Kolar (SC)	K. H. Muniyappa	INC	385,582	42.41	D. S. Veeraiah	BJP	373,947	41.13	11,635	1.28
11	Kanakapura	Tejashwini See Ramesh	INC	584,238	37.63	Ramachandra Gowda	BJP	467,575	30.12	116,663	7.51
12	Bangalore North	H. T. Sangliana	BJP	473,502	40.93	C. K. Jaffer Sharief	INC	443,144	38.31	30,358	2.62
13	Bangalore South	Ananth Kumar	BJP	386,682	48.30	Krishnappa	INC	324,411	40.52	62,271	7.78
14	Mandya	M. H. Ambareesh	INC	411,116	47.94	Dr. S Ramegowda	JD(S)	286,678	33.43	124,438	14.51
15	Chamarajanagar (SC)	M. Shivanna	JD(S)	316,661	37.11	A. Siddaraju	INC	272,672	31.96	43,989	5.16
16	Mysore	C. H. Vijayashankar	BJP	316,442	33.06	A. S. Guruswamy	JD(S)	306,292	32.00	10,150	1.06
17	Mangalore	D. V. Sadananda Gowda	BJP	384,760	48.61	M. Veerappa Moily	INC	351,345	44.39	33,415	4.22
18	Udupi	Manorama Madhwaraj	BJP	369,627	47.37	Vinay Kumar Sorake	INC	340,624	43.65	29,003	3.72
19	Hassan	H. D. Devegowda	JD(S)	462,625	50.72	H. C. Srikantaiah	INC	272,320	29.85	190,305	20.86
20	Chikmagalur	D. C. Srikantappa	BJP	341,391	41.67	B. L. Shankar	INC	267,719	32.68	73,672	8.99
21	Shimoga	S. Bangarappa	BJP	450,097	50.73	Ayanur Manjunath	INC	373,952	42.15	76,145	8.58
22	Kanara	Ananthkumar Hegde	BJP	433,174	51.94	Margaret Alva	INC	260,948	31.29	172,226	20.65
23	Dharwad South	Manjunath Channappa	BJP	442,759	51.20	I. G. Sanadi	INC	297,647	34.42	145,112	16.78
24	Dharwad North	Pralhad Joshi	BJP	385,084	47.51	B. S. Patil	INC	302,006	37.26	83,078	10.25
25	Belgaum	Suresh Angadi	BJP	410,843	45.96	Amarsinh Vasantrao Patil	INC	326,090	36.48	84,753	9.48
26	Chikkodi (SC)	Ramesh Jigajinagi	BJP	379,580	45.30	Ghatage S B	INC	336,088	40.11	43,492	5.19
27	Bagalkot	P. C. Gaddigoudar	BJP	459,451	52.90	S. R. Patil	INC	292,068	33.63	167,383	19.27
28	Bijapur	Basangouda Patil Yatnal	BJP	344,905	43.67	Basanagouda S. Patil	INC	307,372	38.92	37,533	4.75

== Bye-Elections Held ==
Constituency			Winner				Runner Up				Margin
No.	Name	Date	Candidate	Party	Votes	%	Candidate	Party	Votes	%	Margin
1	Bidar (SC)	28 June 2004	Narsingrao Suryawanshi	INC	196,917	32.18	Ramchandra Veerappa	BJP	183,447	29.98	13,470
1	Bidar (SC)	28 June 2004	The Bidar Lok Sabha bypoll was held to fill a vacancy in the constituency during the 14th Lok Sabha.								
21	Shimoga	2 September 2005	S. Bangarappa	SP	269,013	36.00	Ayanur Manjunath	INC	252,376	33.77	16,949
21	Shimoga	2 September 2005	The Shimoga Lok Sabha bypoll was held following the resignation of the incumbent MP.								

== Post-election Union Council of Ministers from Karnataka ==
#	Name	Constituency	Designation	Department	From	To	Party
1	K. H. Muniyappa	Kolar (SC)	MoS	Road Transport and Highways	23 May 2004	22 May 2009	INC
2	Ambareesh M. H.	Mandya	MoS	Information and Broadcasting	24 Oct 2006	15 Feb 2007	INC
3	Oscar Fernandes	Rajya Sabha (Karnataka)	Cabinet Minister	Labour and Employment	24 Oct 2006	3 Mar 2009	INC
3	Oscar Fernandes	Rajya Sabha (Karnataka)	MoS(I/C)	Statistics and Programme Implementation	23 May 2004	29 Jan 2006	INC
3	Oscar Fernandes	Rajya Sabha (Karnataka)	MoS(I/C)	NRI Affairs (Overseas Indian Affairs)	18 Nov 2005	29 Jan 2006	INC
3	Oscar Fernandes	Rajya Sabha (Karnataka)	MoS(I/C)	Youth Affairs and Sports	18 Nov 2005	29 Jan 2006	INC
4	M. V. Rajasekharan	Rajya Sabha (Karnataka)	MoS	Planning	23 May 2004	6 Apr 2008	INC
5	K. Rahman Khan	Rajya Sabha (Karnataka)	MoS	Chemicals and Fertilizers	23 May 2004	20 Jul 2004	INC

== Assembly Segment wise lead ==
Party	Assembly segments	Position in Assembly (as of 2004 election)
Bharatiya Janata Party	109	79
Indian National Congress	67	65
Janata Dal (Secular)	47	58
Janata Dal (United)	1	5
Others	0	17
Total	224	

== See also ==
- Elections in Karnataka
