= First Siddaramaiah ministry =

Government of Karnataka, India (2013–18)

- 30th Ministry of the Karnataka
- Siddaramaiah
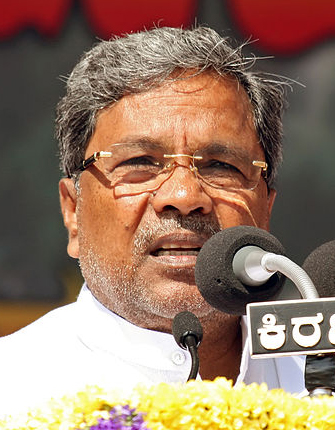
- Date formed: 13 May 2013
- Date dissolved: 15 May 2018

People and organisations
- Head of state: H. R. Bhardwaj (24 June 2009 – 28 June 2014) Konijeti Rosaiah (29 June 2014 – 31 August 2014) Vajubhai Vala (1 September 2014 – 15 May 2018)
- Head of government: Siddaramaiah
- No. of ministers: 33
- Ministers removed: 04
- Member parties: Indian National Congress
- Status in legislature: Majority
- Opposition party: JD(S); BJP
- Opposition leader: H. D. Kumaraswamy (2013-2014); Jagadish Shettar (2014-2018)

History
- Election: 2013
- Outgoing election: 2018
- Legislature term: 5 years
- Budget: 5
- Predecessor: Shettar cabinet
- Successor: H. D. Kumaraswamy second ministry

The Siddaramaiah cabinet was the Council of Ministers in Karnataka, a state in South India headed by Siddaramaiah that was formed after the 2013 Karnataka Legislative Assembly elections.

== Chief Minister & Cabinet Ministers ==
SI No.	Name	Constituency	Department	Party
1.	Siddaramaiah, Chief Minister	Varuna	Minister of Finance, Kannada languages & Culture, Cabinet affairs, Personnel & Administrative reforms, Intelligence wing, Housing and Bangalore city development. Other departments not allocated to a Minister.	INC
2.	Ramalinga Reddy	BTM Layout	Minister of Home affairs.	INC
3.	D. K. Shivakumar	Kanakapura	Minister of Energy.	INC
4.	R. V. Deshpande	Haliyal	Minister of Large & Medium scale industries and Infrastructure development.	INC
5.	H. M. Revanna	MLC	Minister of Transport.	INC
6.	K. J. George	Sarvagna Nagar	Bengaluru Development and Town Planning (31 October 2015 - 18 July 2016); Home (20 May 2013 - 29 October 2015)	INC
7.	Krishna Byre Gowda	Byatarayanapura	Minister of Agriculture.	INC
8.	Ramanath Rai	Bantwal	Minister of Forest, Ecology and Environment.	INC
9.	K. R. Ramesh Kumar	Srinivaspur	Minister of Health and Family welfare.	INC
10.	R. Roshan Baig	Shivajinagar	Minister of Urban development (2016-2018), City corporations, Urban land transport, KUWSDB & KUIDFC, Haj and Waqf. Infrastructure Development, information (2014-2016)	INC
11.	Basavaraj Rayareddy	Yelburga	Minister of Higher Education.	INC
12.	S. S. Mallikarjun	Davanagere	Minister of Horticulture and Agriculture marketing.	INC
13.	H. K. Patil	Gadag	Minister of Rural development and Panchayat raj.	INC
14.	T. B. Jayachandra	Sira	Minister of Minor irrigation, Law & Justice and Parliamentary affairs.	INC
15.	U. T. Khader	Mangalore	Minister of Food & Civil supplies and Consumer affairs.	INC
16.	M. B. Patil	Babaleshwar	Minister of Medium and Major irrigation.	INC
17.	R. B. Timmapur	MLC	Minister of Excise.	INC
18.	Umashree	Terdal	Minister of Women & Child welfare and Kannada & Culture.	INC
19.	A. Manju	Arkalgud	Minister of Animal husbandry and Sericulture.	INC
20.	Santosh Lad	Kalaghatagi	Minister of Labour.	INC
21.	Tanveer Sait	Narasimharaja	Minister of Primary & Secondary education and Minority welfare & Wakf.	INC
22.	Ramesh Jarkiholi	Gokak	Minister of Small scale industries.	INC
23.	Kagodu Thimmappa	Sagar	Minister of Revenue.	INC
24.	Dr. H. C. Mahadevappa	Tirumakudal Narsipur	Minister of Public Works department and Ports & Inland transport.	INC
25.	Dr. Sharan Prakash Patil	Sedam	Minister of Medical education.	INC
26.	H. Anjaneya	Holalkere	Minister of Social welfare & Backward classes.	INC
27.	Pramod Madhwaraj	Udupi	Minister of Fisheries and Youth services & Sports.	INC
28.	Vinay Kulkarni	Dharwad	Minister of Mines and Geology.	INC
29.	M. R. Seetharam	MLC	Minister of Planning & Statistics, IT, BT and Science & Technology.	INC
30.	M. Krishnappa	Vijayanagar	Minister of Housing.	INC

== Minister of State ==
SI No.	Name	Constituency	Department	Party
1.	Priyank M. Kharge	Chittapur	Minister of IT, BT and Science & Technology.	INC
2.	Rudrappa Manappa Lamani	Haveri	Minister of Textiles and Muzrai.	INC
3.	Eshwara Khandre	Bhalki	Minister of Municipalities & Local bodies and Public enterprises.	INC
4.	Geeta Mahadeva Prasad	Gundlupet	Minister of Co-operation and Sugar.	INC

== Parliamentary Secretaries ==
SI No.	Name	Constituency	Department Attached	Party
1.	K. Govindaraj	MLC	Chief Minister	INC
2.	Raju Alagur	Nagathan	Housing.	INC
3.	Umesh G. Jadhav	Chincholi	Health and Family welfare.	INC
4.	R. S. Doddamani	Shirahatti	Irrigation.	INC
5.	C. S. Shivalli	Kundgol	Social Welfare.	INC
6.	Shakuntala Shetty	Puttur	Women and Child Development.	INC
7.	C. Puttarangashetty	Chamarajnagar	RDPR.	INC
8.	H. P. Manjunatha	Hunsur	Industries.	INC
9.	E. Tukaram	Sanduru	Public Works department.	INC
10.	Makbul S. Bagawan	Vijyapura Nagara	Urban Development.	INC

== Former Members ==
SI NO.	Name	Constituency	Department	Reason	Party
1.	Dr. G. Parameshwar	MLC	Minister of Home affairs.	Resigned	INC
2.	Vinay Kumar Sorake	Kaup	Minister of Urban Development.	Removed	INC
3.	M. H. Ambareesh	Mandya	Minister of Housing.	Removed	INC
4.	Satish Jarkiholi	Yemakanmardi	Minister of Excise.	Resigned	INC
5.	K. J. George	Sarvagnanagar	Minister of Bengaluru development.	Resigned	INC
6.	H. S. Mahadeva Prasad	Gundlupet	Minister of Cooperation and Sugar.	Death	INC
7.	Kimmane Ratnakar	Thirthahalli	Minister of Primary and Secondary education.	Removed	INC
8.	Dinesh Gundu Rao	Gandhi Nagar	Minister of State (Independent Charge) for Food and Civil supplies.	Removed	INC
9.	S. Shivashankarappa	Davanagere South	Minister of Horticulture and Agriculture.	Removed	INC
10.	Srinivasa Prasad	Nanjangud	Minister of Revenue.	Removed	INC
11.	P. T. Parameshwar Naik	Hoovina Hadagali	Minister of Labour.	Removed	INC
12.	Baburao Chinchansur	Gurmitkal	Minister of Textile.	Removed	INC
13.	Abhayachandra Jain	Moodabidri	Minister of State for Fisheries.	Removed	INC
14.	Shivaraj Tangadagi	Kanakagiri	Minister of Minor Irrigation.	Removed	INC
15.	H. Y. Meti	Bagalkot	Minister of Excise.	Resigned	INC
16.	S. R. Patil	MLC	Minister of Infrastructure, IT, BT, Science & Technology and Planning & Statistics.	Removed	INC
17.	Qamar ul Islam	Kalaburagi North	Minister of Wakf.	Death	INC

== See also ==
- Politics of Karnataka
