= TA/DA scam =

Political corruption scandal in India

TA/DA scam (Travel And Dearness Allowance) is a corruption scandal during the Siddaramaiah administration in Karnataka state in India. The scam was exposed by BBMP commissioner N. Manjunath Prasad that found eight Member of Legislative Council (MLC) of Karnataka Legislative Council claiming allowances by submitting fake bills.

R. B. Thimmapur, one of the accused, was later made the excise minister. in the Siddaramaiah cabinet The scam is said to have cost the state exchequer a total of 37 lakh rupees. Other MLCs accused in the scam are C. R. Manohar, S. Ravi, N. Appaji Gowda, Allum Veerabhadrappa, G. Raghu Achar, N. S. Boseraju and M. D. Lakshminarayana.

== See also ==
- Dearness allowance
