= Shivanna =

Shivanna may refer to:

- B. Shivanna, Indian politician
- Kagalvadi M. Shivanna, Indian politician
- Kote M. Shivanna, Indian politician
- M. Shivanna, Indian politician
- Shiva Rajkumar, Indian actor known as "Shivanna"
- Shivanna Sam, Trinidad and Tobago politician
- Sogadu Shivanna, Indian politician

== See also ==
- Shivanand
