= Abbasia Begum Mecci =

Indian politician

Member, Karnataka Legislative Council
- In office 1966–1970

Personal details
- Born: November 1922 Bangalore
- Died: 1970 (aged 47–48)
- Party: Indian National Congress
- Spouse: M. S. Mecci
- Children: One son and two daughters
- Education: M.Sc.

Abbasia Begum Mecci (1922–1970) was a member of the legislative council of the Indian state of Mysore (now Karnataka) during the 1960s. She is one of the very few Muslim women of her days to have achieved that status. She took M.Sc. Degree from Central College in 1961.

== Personal life ==
Abbasia Begum Mecci married M. S. Mecci and the couple has one son and two daughters.

== Positions held ==
- worked as Superintendent, Government Vigilance Shelter, Bangalore, for a year.
- Elected to the Legislative Council during April 1960.
