= M. R. Tanga =

Indian politician

Doctor M. R. Tanga

Member of Karnataka Legislative Council
- In office 22 June 1988 – 1 November 2005
- Succeeded by: Manohara Maski
- Constituency: North-East Graduates

Personal details
- Born: 28 November 1935; Gulbarga, Hyderabad State
- Died: 1 November 2005 (aged 69); Bangalore, Karnataka
- Spouse: Late Vilasmati Tanga
- Children: 4 sons
- Parent: Rukamanappa (father)
- Education: M.B.B.S, M.S., FACS, FICS, FICH

M. R. Tanga (28 November 1935 – 1 November 2005) was an Indian politician from the Bharatiya Janata Party, Karnataka who was the Member of Karnataka Legislative Council from 1988 till his death in 2005. He was the party floor leader in the state Legislative Council. He was an MLC for three terms, state unit vice-president and member of the National Executive of the Bharatiya Janata Party.
