= Bharathi Shetty =

Indian politician

Member of Karnataka Legislative Council
- In office 22 July 2020 – 21 July 2026
- Preceded by: Ivan D'Souza
- Constituency: Nominated
- In office 1 July 2008 – 30 June 2014
- Constituency: elected by Legislative Assembly members

Personal details
- Born: Bharathi Shetty; 7 April 1960 (age 66) Sorab, Shimoga district, Karnataka
- Spouse: Satish Shetty
- Parent: Ganappa Shetty (father)

Bharathi Shetty is an Indian politician who is the current member of the Karnataka Legislative Council. She was nominated as MLC on 22 July 2020 by the Yediyurappa Government.
