= S. Rudregowda =

Indian politician

Member of the Karnataka Legislative Council
- In office 18 June 2018 – 17 June 2024
- Preceded by: D. S. Veeraiah, BJP
- Succeeded by: C. T. Ravi, BJP
- Constituency: Elected by MLAs

Personal details
- Party: Bharatiya Janata Party

On 4 June 2018, S. Rudregowda was elected unopposed to the Karnataka Legislative Council. Out of 11 seats, the INC won 4 seats, JD(S) 2 and BJP 5.
