= M. Srinivas =

M. Srinivas may refer to:

- M. Srinivas (born 1942), Indian politician
- M. Srinivas (born 1945), Indian politician
- Mangalapally Srinivas, Indian Cricketer
- M. Srinivas (medical professional), Indian
