= S. Ravi =

S. Ravi may refer to:

- Sundaram Ravi (born 1966), cricket umpire
- S. Ravi (politician), member of the Tamil Nadu Legislative Assembly
- Shambulingaiah Ravi (born 1967), member of Karnataka Legislative Council
