= Anti-conversion law =

Rules restricting proselytism

Anti-conversion laws, or anti-conversion legislations, are a set of judicial rules that restrict or prohibit conversion of faith (proselytism) from one religion to another. It is a federal law in countries such as Algeria, Bhutan, India, Myanmar, and Nepal. They are meant to prevent forced conversion of individuals to different religions, and offences are punishable by imprisonment and fine. Sri Lanka has prepared its legislation, but has not yet enacted it. Pakistan had introduced the Prohibition of Forced Conversion Bill 2021 that was rejected by its Ministry of Religious Affairs in 2021.

== Algeria ==
The constitution of Algeria declares that Islam is the state religion. Religious conversion law was included in 2006, according to which an attempt to convert a Muslim will be penalised with five years in prison and a fine of USD70 to 140. Muhammad Aissa, director of the Ministry of Religious Affairs, explained that the new law was to restrict Christian evangelists who were part of the "tool to destabilize the country during the last bloody decade."

As amended in 2020, the provision adds that "The freedom to exercise worship is guaranteed if it is exercised in accordance with the law." It specifies that although religious conversion itself is permissible, it contains an anti-conversion law that prohibits religious act that "incites, constrains, or utilizes means of seduction intending to convert a Muslim to another religion; or by using establishments of teaching, education, health, social, culture, training…or any financial means." Classified as a criminal offence, violation carries a penalty of one million dinars (USD7,200) and five-year imprisonment.

== Bhutan ==
The constitution of Bhutan states that Buddhism is the religious heritage of the country and violation of Buddhist practices are prohibited. Although it emphasises on "the right to freedom of thought, conscience, and religion" to all its citizens, its constitution has a clause: "No person shall be compelled to belong to another faith by means of coercion or inducement." An explicit anti-conversion clause was included in the 2011 amendment; The Penal Code (Amendment) Act of Bhutan 2011 Article 463A reads:

Compelling others to belong to another faith: A defendant shall be guilty of the offence of compelling others to belong to another faith if the defendant uses coercion or other forms of inducement to cause the conversion of a person from one religion or faith to another.

The specifics of coercion and inducement are not defined. Offenders are given three-year imprisonment, and is mostly targeted at Christians.

== India ==
In India, anti-conversion laws were instituted in the 1930s under the British Rule for some Hindu princely states. The aim was to prevent Christianisation and "to preserve Hindu religious identity in the face of British missionaries." Raigarh State Conversion Act of 1936 was enforced by the Raigarh Chief, Chakradhar Singh to protect lower castes and tribes of Hindu community. The Patna Freedom of Religion Act of 1942, the Sarguja State Apostasy Act 1945, and the Udaipur State Anti-Conversion Act of 1946 were subsequently introduced.

After Indian independence, as the Indian constitution was prepared, the Constituent Assembly's Advisory Committee on Fundamental Rights proposed a clause against conversion by "coercion or undue influence" but was ultimately rejected. The Indian Conversion (Regulation and Registration) Bill was put up in 1954, which aimed to administer the "licensing of missionaries and the registration of conversion with government officials". The bill was turned down in the lower house of parliament. Other bills to check Hindus converting to other religions were introduced in 1954 and 1967, but were rejected. In 1977, the Supreme Court of India upheld (through a challenge, Rev. Stanislaus v. State of Madhya Pradesh and Orissa) that the anti-conversion regulation of Madhya Pradesh and Odisha (then Orissa) as being constitutional. In 2015, the Ministry of Law and Justice announced that the federal government could not legislate anti-conversion laws and that they were under the purview of state legislatures.

There is no federal law regulating religious conversions. Arunachal Pradesh had formulated the Freedom of Religion Act, 1978, but was never enacted. Rajasthan also approved its bills in 2006 and 2008, but did not receive approval from the Governor and the President of India both times. Tamil Nadu passed its bill in 2002, but was revoked after public protests. As of 2023, ten states have authorised their own laws. The states follow the similar principles of anti-religious conversion commonly described as conversion due to force or inducement or by fraudulent means. Religious conversions are not totally prohibited and can be done by authorisation from the district magistrates following legal procedures.

=== Chhattisgarh ===
The Chhattisgarh Religion Freedom (Amendment) Act, 2006 legalised either a three-year imprisonment and penalty up to INR 20,000 or both for offenders. In case an offender converts an individual who is a minor, woman or a member of scheduled caste or scheduled tribe, the penalty increase to four years imprisonment, and a fine of INR 200,000.

=== Gujarat ===
The Gujarat Freedom of Religion Act, 2003 was created in 2003 and updated as the Gujarat Freedom of Religion (Amendment) Bill in 2006 and in 2021. Offenders can be imprisoned for three years with a fine of up to INR 50,000. Offenders who convert an individual who is a minor, belongs to a scheduled caste or scheduled tribe or is a woman can be fined up to INR 100,000. The 2021 amendment specifies inter-religious marriage as a form of forced conversion. However, the Gujarat High Court withheld the clause.

=== Haryana ===
The Haryana Prevention of Unlawful Conversion of Religion Act, 2022, provides a penalty of one to five years imprisonment and a fine of INR 100,000. It also makes concealment of religion during marriage a punishable crime carrying a penalty of three to ten years imprisonment and a fine of INR 300,000.

=== Himachal Pradesh ===
The Himachal Pradesh Freedom of Religion Act was introduced in 2006. It was revised as the Freedom of Religion (Amendment) Bill, 2022, with milder penalties. The punishment for forced conversion was reduced to one to five years from the earlier 10 years. Marriage involving religious conversion is illegal. If conversion involves a minor, woman or a member of scheduled caste or scheduled tribe, the imprisonment is two to seven years.

=== Jharkhand ===
The Jharkhand Freedom of Religion Act, 2017 imposes imprisonment of up to three years and a fine of INR 50,000 or both for offences. The penalty is higher, a four-year imprisonment and INR 100,000 fine, or both, if the person converted is a minor, woman or a member of scheduled caste or scheduled tribe.

=== Karnataka ===
The Karnataka Protection of Right to Freedom of Religion Act, 2021, was approved in 2022 that prohibits unauthorised inter-religious marriage. Any forced conversion is punishable by three to five years imprisonment, and a fine of INR 25,000. In case an offender is a minor, woman or a member of scheduled caste or scheduled tribe, the penalty increase to three to ten years imprisonment, and a fine of INR 50,000. Mass conversion will lead to three to ten years imprisonment, and a fine of INR 100,000.

=== Madhya Pradesh ===
Madhya Pradesh was the second state to have anti-conversion law. It passed its Dharma Swatantrya Adhiniyam (Religious Freedom Act) in 1968 enforcing "prohibition of conversion from one religion to another by use of force or allurement, or by fraudulent means, and matters incidental thereto." Punishment for offence was either one-year incarceration or a fine of INR 1,000, or both. The Madhya Pradesh Freedom of Religion Ordinance, 2020, enforced in 2021, imposes offence with up to one year in prison, and a fine of INR 5,000. In case a minor, woman or a member of scheduled caste or scheduled tribe, imprisonment can be up to two years imprisonment, and a fine INR 10,000.

=== Odisha ===
The Government of Odisha (then Orissa) was the first state to institute anti-conversion law. The Orissa Freedom of Religion Act, 1967 "provides that no person shall convert or attempt to convert, either directly or otherwise, any person from one religious faith to another by the use of force or by inducement or by any fraudulent means." Violation of the law is punishable by one-year imprisonment and a fine or INR 5,000, or both. It became a model for other states.

=== Rajasthan ===
The Rajasthan Prohibition of Unlawful Religious Conversion Bill was passed on September 9, 2025. Standard conversions are punishable by seven to fourteen years imprisonment and a minimum fine of INR 500,000, with more severe punishments for the forced conversion of vulnerable groups, mass conversions, and repeat offenders.

=== Uttarakhand ===
The Uttarakhand Freedom of Religious Act, 2018 mandates a punishment to offenders one to five years in prison, or two to seven years in case of a minor, woman or a member of scheduled caste or scheduled tribe.

=== Uttar Pradesh ===
The Uttar Pradesh Prohibition of Unlawful Conversion of Religion Ordinance, 2020, approved in 2021, enforces conviction of offenders one to ten years in prison, or two to ten years in case of a minor, woman or a member of scheduled caste or scheduled tribe. Unauthorised inter-religious marriage is also an offence.

=== Controversies ===
Anti-conversion laws in India are seen as violation of secularism and religious freedom under the Fundamental Rights. A lawyer and expert in Indian constitution, Hormasji Maneckji Seervai had remarked the Supreme Court standing on upholding the anticonversion laws as wrong and "productive of the greatest public mischief."

Most of the anti-conversion laws in India were implemented after the Narendra Modi-led the Bharatiya Janata Party (BJP) took up the Indian government since 2014, except in Chhattisgarh, Himachal Pradesh and Odisha. Although prior the BJP government, Gujarat enacted its law in 2003 when BJP ruled the state legislature under Modi. The BJP has been accused by other parties and non-Hindu religions as reviving the prohibitionary laws. As one of the propagandas under the right-wing activism, the Rashtriya Swayamsevak Sangh (RSS), regulations on religious conversion became a major objectives of BJP. Especially the Hindu-Muslim marriage had been a major concern, which the Hindu nationalists popularly dubbed the "love jihad." Such movements are viewed as contravention not only of religious freedom, but also of other constitutional rights such as the Right to Life and Personal Liberty (Article 21) and the Right to Equality (Article 14). Opponents of the laws claim that these are unjustified and unconstitutional.

The BJP itself has no specified nation-wide policy on religious conversion issues, and the party leaders do not share the same enthusiasms. At the Lok Sabha session in 2022, a Union minister Giriraj Singh said, "There should be a law against dharmantaran (religious proselytisation) across the country." Even in the absence of anti-conversion laws, there are several criminal cases recorded on forced conversion. For example, in Maharashtra, there is no such laws (though the bill has been prepared) yet Christians have been arrested for allegedly converting Hindus. The Deputy Chief Minister and Home Minister Devendra Fadnavis claimed that they "already have an anti-conversion law. No one can force (anyone) to convert."

When the Karnataka bill for anti-conversion law was prepared, the BJP's spokesperson Ganesh Karnik announced that the government was fully "committed to introducing this anti-conversion bill," but an undisclosed BJP leader objected to it as there was no unanimity in the legislature and could be an "embarrassment" to the party. The BJP did not have majority initially and the bill was left undecided in 2021. In early 2022, the BJP gained support and was able to pass the bill in September.

The opposition party, the Indian National Congress, the Janata Dal (Secular) and Christian community opposed to and protested against the bill arguing it as unconstitutional and "completely illegal." Chief Minister Basavaraj Bommai defended the bill, saying, "We are not opposing religious conversion itself. We are trying to stop forceful conversion and conversion that takes advantage of the weakness... [It is only] to make sure that it is willful [sic] and legal." The bill was prepared during the earlier Congress government, to which J. C. Madhu Swamy, minister for law and parliamentary affairs, retorted: "It is absurd that Congress members are opposing a bill proposed by their own government."

In August 2021, the Gujarat High Court issued a notification of withholding parts of the Gujarat's religious laws including section 5, which is the main anti-conversion law. Following the petition filed by a petition filed by Muhammed Hakim, the court declared that the terms "violate the right to life." The court specified that inter-religious marriage is not a form of forced conversion unless there are evidences of frauds and allurement, and does not require official approval from the district magistrate.

in July 2025, the arrest of two Christian nuns in Kerala for alleged trafficking resulted in outrage and protests from Christian communities.

=== Consequences ===
In 2002, 22 scheduled caste (Satnami) people converted to Christianity at Mirigunda village in Raigarh. The accused perpetrators, two priests and a nun, were convicted by the Raigarh court for violating the law. The converted submitted a petition to the court that they were influenced from reading the Bible and not induced while converting. The court ignored the petition and convicted the three people on charges of forced conversion to imprisonment.

As of 2021, in Uttar Pradesh, 108 police reports, involving 350 people with 189 arrests and 72 convictions, were recorded for violations of anti-conversion laws. In June 2022, Mohammad Umar Gautam and Mufti Qazi Jahangir Alam Qasmi of the Islamic Dawah Centre India were arrested on charges of mass-converting Hindus to Islam. In September 2022, a 26-year-old man was arrested and charged under Uttar Pradesh's anti-conversion law. The Muslim man had eloped with a Hindu minor girl with a promise of marriage and changed her religion in 2021. The Uttar Pradesh district court convicted him, sentenced him to five years of imprisonment and gave him a ₹40,000 fine.

A day after the Karnataka law was enacted on 17 May 2022, Pastor Kuryichan V and his wife Salenamma were arrested by the Karnataka police following a complaint from the Hindu activists for performing mass conversion on tribal workers in Kodagu. They were initially arrested under the Indian Penal Code Section 295 (a) (deliberate and malicious acts, intended to outrage religious feelings of any class by insulting its religion or religious beliefs), as the police had not yet received the official notification of the anti-conversion law. and will be charged under the new law once received.

In Madhya Pradesh, three Christian missionaries were arrested in December 2021 in Bicholi village. They were accused of attempting to convert members of Hindu tribes by offering free education and medical services.

In Gujarat, the Missionaries of Charity, established by Mother Teresa, had been accused of converting Hindus. Several police cases have been closed as no evidence was brought to court. The worker nuns have been arrested. In December 2021, the organization was under investigation for alleged child trafficking. The central government froze all international funding for the organisation.

Challenge to Constitutionality

Supreme Court of India is currently hearings pleas challenging the constitutional validity of anti-conversion laws enacted by Uttar Pradesh, Madhya Pradesh, Himachal Pradesh, Uttarakhand, Chhattisgarh, Gujarat, Haryana, Jharkhand, and Karnataka.

== Myanmar ==
Myanmar is a secular state but dominated by Buddhism, especially the politics by Buddhist nationalism. Article 34 of the Constitution of Myanmar, which recognizes religious freedom: "Every citizen is equally entitled to freedom of conscience and the right to freely profess and practise religion subject to public order, morality or health and to the other provisions of this Constitution." In 2015, the Association for the Protection of Race and Religion, known as Ma Ba Tha, introduced the Race and Religion Protection Laws to the Parliament of Burma. After approval, it was enacted by the President Thein Sein on 26 August 2015. Religious conversion should by applied to and approved by authorised registration boards. The law prohibits application "for conversion to a new religion with the intent of insulting, degrading, destroying or misusing any religion," the penalty of violation of which is two-year imprisonment or a fine of 200,000 Kyats, or both.

It was seen as "another means of discrimination against anyone who is non-Buddhist" as it legally requires the state permission for converting one's religion. The U.S. Commission on International Religious Freedom Chairman Robert P. George remarked: "Burma's leaders once again have disregarded internationally agreed human rights standards. The government claims that these bills protect women and religion, but civil society groups in Burma have exposed them for what they are – tools the government uses to continue to violate the freedom of religion and related human rights."

== Sri Lanka ==
The Jathika Hela Urumaya, a Buddhist nationalists' party, introduced the Bill on Prohibition of Forcible Conversion in 2004. According to proposed provision the penalty for offence would be an imprisonment for seven years and a fine of up to Sri Lankan rupees 500,000 (USD4,425). The Christian and civil rights groups challenged it to the Supreme Court, which ruled that the main clauses violate the constitution. A modified version was put up in 2009 before the Parliament of Sri Lanka, and was rejected by the majority. In 2020, the Prime Minister Mahinda Rajapaksa announced again that the bill was prepared.
