= Veeraiah =

Veeraiah is an Indian surname. Notable people with the surname include:

- D. S. Veeraiah (born 1946), Indian politician
- Sandra Venkata Veeraiah (born 1968), Indian politician
- Dhulipalla Veeraiah Chowdary (1942–1994), Indian politician
