= Bidar sedition case =

2020 legal case

The Bidar sedition case refers to legal proceedings initiated in January 2020 against administrators of Shaheen School in Bidar, Karnataka, India. The controversy began when students at the school performed a dramatic presentation that criticized the Citizenship Amendment Act (CAA) and the proposed National Register of Citizens (NRC).

== Background and arrests ==
In January 2020, students at Shaheen Primary School in Bidar presented a theatrical performance addressing the Citizenship Amendment Act and National Register of Citizens. According to police accounts, this performance took place during a parent-teacher meeting, but parents strongly disputed this version of events, insisting the children were simply rehearsing in their classroom. The theatrical piece focused on themes related to the Citizenship Amendment Act and National Register of Citizens. Media reports suggested the play presented the NRC as potentially harmful to India's Muslim population.

The complaint against the school came from someone connected to the Akhil Bharatiya Vidyarthi Parishad (ABVP), which serves as the student organization for the Rashtriya Swayamsevak Sangh (RSS). Police filed their First Information Report (FIR) on 26 January 2020, invoking several serious provisions of the Indian Penal Code: the sedition law (IPC 124A), charges of promoting enmity between different groups (IPC 153A), and accusations of statements that could cause public mischief (IPC 505(2)).

Police arrested the school's headmistress, Fareeda Begum, and a parent, Najbunnisa, on 30 January 2020. Both women remained in custody until 11 February 2020, when a local court granted bail. The investigation included questioning 85 students, including children as young as nine years old. Although police maintained that teachers and child welfare officials were present during these sessions, the involvement of uniformed officers in minor interrogations drew substantial criticism. Police also seized a mobile phone and hard disk from the school.

== Legal proceedings ==
The Karnataka High Court expressed significant concern regarding police procedures for questioning children, characterizing it as a "serious violation of child rights." The court found that police had failed to follow required procedures under the Juvenile Justice (Care and Protection of Children) Act, 2015 when recording statements from minors. Internal police investigations subsequently confirmed violations of proper procedures for questioning minors. Following these determinations, the Karnataka High Court ordered the state government in September 2021 to initiate disciplinary action against officers who violated the Juvenile Justice Act during their investigation. The state government subsequently informed the court that appropriate disciplinary measures had been implemented.

This case became integrated into broader legal challenges to sedition law in India. In 2021, activists filed a Public Interest Litigation (PIL) in the Supreme Court of India requesting guidelines to prevent sedition charge misuse, citing the Bidar case among other examples. The Supreme Court rejected this petition. A similar PIL in August 2023, seeking to establish a mechanism for scrutinizing sedition complaints before FIR registration, was also dismissed.

== Public reaction and aftermath ==
Opposition politicians, civil society organizations, and human rights groups responded strongly to the case. Congress MLC Ivan D'Souza publicly demanded charge withdrawal, characterizing them as an assault on freedom of expression. Amnesty International urged authorities to drop the charges entirely, stating that "criticizing the government is not sedition." Child rights activists expressed particular concern about police practices of questioning young children while in uniform, viewing this as intimidating and inappropriate.

The Karnataka High Court concluded the matter on 14 June 2023 by dismissing all proceedings against the school management. The court determined that the play represented legitimate criticism of government policy and failed to meet the legal threshold for sedition. The detailed judgment, released months later, explained that the play had not incited violence or public disorder and therefore enjoyed constitutional free speech protection.

Legal scholars have since regularly referenced this case in academic discussions regarding sedition law operation in contemporary India.
