= Allum Veerabhadrappa =

Indian politician

Allam Veerabhadrappa

President of Karnataka Pradesh Congress Committee
- In office 15 March 2001 – June 2003
- Preceded by: V. S. Koujalgi
- Succeeded by: Janardhana Poojary

Member(elect) of Karnataka Legislative Council Karnataka
- In office 14 June 2016 – 14 June 2022
- Preceded by: Mattikatti Veeranna, INC

Cabinet Minister, Government of Karnataka
- In office 2003–2004
- Water Resources; Environment; Ecology
- Chief Minister: S. M. Krishna

Member of the Karnataka Legislative Assembly, Karnataka
- In office 1989–2004
- Preceded by: B Shivarama Reddy
- Succeeded by: Suryanarayana Reddy
- Constituency: Kurugodu

Personal details
- Born: 29 March 1948 (age 78) Ballari, Kingdom of Mysore (present–day Karnataka), India
- Party: INC
- Children: Allum Prashant
- Occupation: Politician, Mining

Allam Veerabhadrappa is a leader of the Indian National Congress in Karnataka. He is a former president of the Karnataka Pradesh Congress Committee.

On 10 June 2016, he was elected to the Karnataka Legislative Council. He secured 33 votes of Indian National Congress MLAs. He is a four-time MLA from Kurogod (Bellary) and was a minister in SM Krishna's cabinet.

He was minister for water resources, environment, agriculture, and ecology. He is a close associate of SM Krishna, former chief minister. He is a mine owner from Bellary. He played a key role in G. Janardhana Reddy's case.

== See also ==
- TA/DA scam
