= Ganesh Karnik =

Indian politician

Captain Ganesh Karnik

Member of Karnataka Legislative Council
- In office 22 June 2006 – 21 June 2018
- Succeeded by: S. L. Bhojegowda
- Constituency: Karnataka South-West Teachers

Personal details
- Born: 6 April 1959 (age 67) Karkala
- Citizenship: Indian
- Party: Bharatiya Janata Party
- Education: University of Agricultural Sciences, Dharwad
- Portfolio: Deputy Chairman of Karnataka Legislative Council

Military service
- Allegiance: India
- Branch/service: Indian army
- Years of service: 1981-1987
- Rank: Captain

Ganesh Karnik is an Indian former military officer and politician from the BJP who was the Member of the Karnataka Legislative Council from 22 June 2012 to 21 June 2018. He was the Chief Whip of the opposition party in Karnataka Legislative Council. He is a retired captain of the Indian Army and served along the north, east and western borders of India and voluntarily retired from the service. He has served Nitte Education Trust in various positions and continues to serve in honorary and professional capacities.

== Military career ==
Karnik joined the Indian army in 1981 and served as a commissioned officer along the North-East and the western border of the country. He took voluntary retirement from the Army in 1988 as a Captain.

== Political career ==
He has been part of Rashtriya Swayamsevak Sangh. He is also involved in social activities and has collaborated with Ramakrishna Mission, Mangalore on Swach Bharath initiatives. Karnik continuous to serve as director at Nitte Education Trust, the umbrella organisation for all educational initiatives run by Shri Vinaya Hegde.

Karnik entered the field of politics as a member of the Karnataka Legislative Council in 2006 representing the South-west Teachers’ Constituency (which includes Dakshina Kannada, Udupi, Shimoga, Kodagu, Chikmagalur districts and Channagiri and Honnalli taluks of Davanagere district). He has represented the teachers in the Council.

He highlighted how Karnataka politics had got ugly, but also said that unless more intellectuals come in and reform the political system, such practices continue to remain.

In June 2012, Karnik was elected as a member of the Karnataka Legislative Council representing the Bangalore South-East Teachers’ Constituency. Currently he is the Chief Spokesperson of the BJP for Karnataka.

He was recently appointed as the BJP incharge for Dakshina Kannada District during the Lok Sabha elections of 2024.
