= A. Devegowda =

Indian politician

Member of the Karnataka Legislative Council
- In office 22 June 2018 – 21 June 2024
- Preceded by: Ramachandra Gowda, BJP
- Succeeded by: Ramoji Gowda, INC
- Constituency: Bangalore Graduates

Personal details
- Party: Bharatiya Janata Party

A. Devegowda is an Indian politician who belongs to the Bharatiya Janata Party. As of February 2023, he is currently a member of the Karnataka Legislative Council from 22 June 2018, from the Bangalore Graduates constituency.
