= K. P. Nanjundi =

Indian politician

Member of the Karnataka Legislative Council
- In office 18 June 2018 – 23 April 2024
- Preceded by: M. Bhanuprakash, BJP

State Vice-President of Bharatiya Janata Party of the Karnataka
- In office 2017–2024

State President of Akhila Vishwakarma Mahasabha of Karnataka
- Incumbent
- Assumed office 2017

Personal details
- Born: Kullachar Nanjundachar; 1964 or 1965 (age 61–62) Bangalore
- Party: Indian National Congress; April 2024-present
- Other political affiliations: Indian National Congress (till 2017); Bharatiya Janata Party (2017-2024)

Kullachar Nanjundachar, popularly known as K. P. Nanjundi is an Indian politician and businessman serving as the state vice-president of Bharatiya Janata Party, Karnataka since 2017 and a member of Karnataka Legislative Council from 18 June 2018. He is the state president of Akhila Karnataka Vishwakarma Mahasabha. He is the owner of Sri Lakshmi Golds Palace jewellery chain and also the owner of TV1 Kannada news channel. Nanjundi, a former Congress leader, joined Bharatiya Janata Party in 2017. He is the owner of Sri Lakshmi Golds Palace jewellery chain. Nanjundi joined Indian National Congress in April 2024.

== Early life ==
Hailing from poor family in Vinoba Nagar in Bangalore, Nanjundi was born as Kullachar Nanjundachar, the fourth of eight siblings. He cleared XIIth exam with a first class. But since his father's death resulted in further financial problems, Nanjundi had to work his father's job in the day and plied an auto rickshaw at night, using the time in between to attend an evening college.

== Business ==
Nanjundi is the owner of the Sri Lakshmi Golds Palace, a chain of jewellery shops, which has branches in Bangalore, Mangalore, Hubli and Belgaum.
