= Veena Achaiah =

Indian politician

Member of the Karnataka Legislative Council
- In office 14 June 2016 – 13 June 2022
- Preceded by: Narayana Bhandage

President of Kodagu District Congress Committee
- In office 8 February 2004 – 20??
- Preceded by: M. G. Kuttappa

Personal details
- Born: 6 October 1961 (age 64) Kodagu, Mysore State, India
- Party: Indian National Congress
- Occupation: Politician

Shantheyanda Veena Achaiah (born 6 October 1961) is an Indian politician and member of the Karnataka Legislative Council from the Indian National Congress (INC). She is a former president of the Kodagu District Congress Committee, while also having served as the president of the Kodagu Zilla Panchayat.

== Career ==
Veena was first elected to the Kodagu district council in 1985. In 2002, she was elected the president of the council. She was again elected to the post in 2004 which she held for a period of 41 days before being appointed president of Kodagu District Congress Committee (KDCC), in February 2004. During this time, she also served as president of the Kodagu Mahila Congress.

In 2015, Veena served as chairperson of the Karnataka State Handicrafts Development Corporation. In June 2016, she was elected to the Karnataka Legislative Council, securing 31 votes of Indian National Congress members of the legislative assembly. She was again elected in 2020.

== Controversy ==
In 2017, during the Independence Day celebrations in Madikeri, INC leader and chairman of Karnataka Silk Marketing Board Limited, T. P. Ramesh, was caught on camera attempting to hold Veena's hand, who freed herself. After the video was shared on the media and the incident drew criticism, Ramesh responded stating that his "intention was not to touch her inappropriately" and that he treated her like his "sister". Veena stated that he had apologized to her before adding that the incident was "shocking" and that she was "taken aback by it". Ramesh later quit from the post and was resigned from the primary membership of the INC.
