= Kurugodu Assembly constituency =

Former Assembly constituency in Karnataka, India

Coordinates: 15.344903°N 76.834121°E

Kurugodu
- Former constituency for the Karnataka Legislative Assembly

Constituency details
- Country: India
- Region: South India
- State: Karnataka
- Division: Gulbarga
- District: Ballari
- Lok Sabha constituency: Bellary
- Established: 1957
- Abolished: 2008
- Reservation: None

Kurugodu Assembly constituency was one of the constituencies in Karnataka state assembly in India until 2008 when it was made defunct. It was part of Bellary Lok Sabha constituency.

== Members of the Legislative Assembly ==
Election	Member	Party
1957	Allum Sumangalamma	Indian National Congress
1962	Allum Karibasappa	Indian National Congress
1967	Allum Karibasappa	Indian National Congress
1972	H. Linga Reddy	Indian National Congress
1978	M. Ramappa	Indian National Congress
1983	Naganagouda. H	Indian National Congress
1985	B. Shivarama Reddy	Janata Party
1989	Allum Veerabhadrappa	Indian National Congress
1994	Allum Veerabhadrappa	Indian National Congress
1999	Allum Veerabhadrappa	Indian National Congress
2004	N. Suryanarayana Reddy	Janata Dal

== Election results ==
=== Assembly Election 2004 ===
2004 Karnataka Legislative Assembly election : Kurugodu
Party	Candidate	Votes	%	±%
JD(S)	N. Suryanarayana Reddy	56,517	42.20%	▲33.48
BJP	Ramalingappa. K. A	37,246	27.81%	▼13.69
INC	Allum Veerabhadrappa	29,749	22.21%	▼23.54
Independent	Arunkumar	2,966	2.21%	New
BSP	Shivalinga. B	2,813	2.10%	▼1.79
JP	Jeeru Basavaraj	2,573	1.92%	New
Parcham Party of India	Usha Rani. C	2,058	1.54%	New
Margin of victory		19,271	14.39%	▲10.13
Turnout		133,922	68.80%	▼2.62
Total valid votes		133,922		
Registered electors		194,643		▲25.57
JD(S) gain from INC		Swing	▼3.55	

=== Assembly Election 1999 ===
1999 Karnataka Legislative Assembly election : Kurugodu
Party	Candidate	Votes	%	±%
INC	Allum Veerabhadrappa	47,395	45.75%	▲12.08
BJP	N. Suryanarayana Reddy	42,987	41.50%	▲32.42
JD(S)	Y. Nettakallappa	9,038	8.72%	New
BSP	Anjinappa Chellagurki	4,027	3.89%	New
Margin of victory		4,408	4.26%	▼1.05
Turnout		110,707	71.42%	▲2.48
Total valid votes		103,589		
Rejected ballots		7,086	6.40%	▲1.84
Registered electors		155,004		▲9.54
INC hold		Swing	▲12.08	

=== Assembly Election 1994 ===
1994 Karnataka Legislative Assembly election : Kurugodu
Party	Candidate	Votes	%	±%
INC	Allum Veerabhadrappa	31,341	33.67%	▼18.99
INC	M. Ramappa	26,400	28.36%	New
JD	B. Shivarama Reddy	23,297	25.02%	▼9.90
BJP	S. Lakshminarayana	8,456	9.08%	New
Independent	M. Jayaramappa	1,103	1.18%	New
KRRS	S. Poranagoud	840	0.90%	New
Margin of victory		4,941	5.31%	▼12.43
Turnout		97,547	68.94%	▲3.50
Total valid votes		93,095		
Rejected ballots		4,452	4.56%	▼3.35
Registered electors		141,499		▲3.97
INC hold		Swing	▼18.99	

=== Assembly Election 1989 ===
1989 Karnataka Legislative Assembly election : Kurugodu
Party	Candidate	Votes	%	±%
INC	Allum Veerabhadrappa	43,189	52.66%	▲7.84
JD	B. Shivarama Reddy	28,640	34.92%	New
JP	B. Eswaraiah	9,199	11.22%	New
Independent	A. Suruyanarayana Sharma	989	1.21%	New
Margin of victory		14,549	17.74%	▲7.91
Turnout		89,064	65.44%	▲5.29
Total valid votes		82,017		
Rejected ballots		7,047	7.91%	▲5.18
Registered electors		136,099		▲34.14
INC gain from JP		Swing	▼1.99	

=== Assembly Election 1985 ===
1985 Karnataka Legislative Assembly election : Kurugodu
Party	Candidate	Votes	%	±%
JP	B. Shivarama Reddy	32,446	54.65%	New
INC	H. Nagana Gowda	26,608	44.82%	▼1.41
Margin of victory		5,838	9.83%	▲5.44
Turnout		61,030	60.15%	▲0.41
Total valid votes		59,366		
Rejected ballots		1,664	2.73%	▼1.30
Registered electors		101,460		▲18.28
JP gain from INC		Swing	▲8.42	

=== Assembly Election 1983 ===
1983 Karnataka Legislative Assembly election : Kurugodu
Party	Candidate	Votes	%	±%
INC	Naganagouda. H	22,734	46.23%	▲41.41
Independent	Rajashekharagouda. N. Alias Lokanaguoda	20,575	41.84%	New
LKD	Durugappa. B	5,536	11.26%	New
Independent	Rajeshekhargouda	329	0.67%	New
Margin of victory		2,159	4.39%	▼10.20
Turnout		51,240	59.74%	▼10.66
Total valid votes		49,174		
Rejected ballots		2,066	4.03%	▼0.22
Registered electors		85,777		▲10.06
INC gain from INC(I)		Swing	▼4.85	

=== Assembly Election 1978 ===
1978 Karnataka Legislative Assembly election : Kurugodu
Party	Candidate	Votes	%	±%
INC(I)	M. Ramappa	26,833	51.08%	New
JP	Allum Veerabhadrappa	19,168	36.49%	New
Independent	Durugappa. B	4,003	7.62%	New
INC	Seetharama Reddy. G	2,531	4.82%	▼50.74
Margin of victory		7,665	14.59%	▲3.48
Turnout		54,867	70.40%	▼1.03
Total valid votes		52,535		
Rejected ballots		2,332	4.25%	▲4.25
Registered electors		77,935		▲10.69
INC(I) gain from INC		Swing	▼4.48	

=== Assembly Election 1972 ===
1972 Mysore State Legislative Assembly election : Kurugodu
Party	Candidate	Votes	%	±%
INC	H. Linga Reddy	26,914	55.56%	▼7.71
INC(O)	Allum Veerabhadrappa	21,531	44.44%	New
Margin of victory		5,383	11.11%	▼15.42
Turnout		50,290	71.43%	▼1.48
Total valid votes		48,445		
Registered electors		70,409		▲22.72
INC hold		Swing	▼7.71	

=== Assembly Election 1967 ===
1967 Mysore State Legislative Assembly election : Kurugodu
Party	Candidate	Votes	%	±%
INC	A. Karibasappa	24,892	63.27%	▲1.14
SWA	C. M. Revanasiddaiah	14,453	36.73%	New
Margin of victory		10,439	26.53%	▲2.28
Turnout		41,828	72.91%	▲8.40
Total valid votes		39,345		
Registered electors		57,372		▲14.36
INC hold		Swing	▲1.14	

=== Assembly Election 1962 ===
1962 Mysore State Legislative Assembly election : Kurugodu
Party	Candidate	Votes	%	±%
INC	Allum Veerabhadrappa	18,995	62.13%	▲3.52
Independent	Hampa Reddy	11,580	37.87%	New
Margin of victory		7,415	24.25%	▲7.03
Turnout		32,364	64.51%	▼4.82
Total valid votes		30,575		
Registered electors		50,167		▲11.21
INC hold		Swing	▲3.52	

=== Assembly Election 1957 ===
1957 Mysore State Legislative Assembly election : Kurugodu
Party	Candidate	Votes	%	±%
INC	Allam Sumangalamma	18,332	58.61%	New
Independent	Kavithalada Doddabasappa	12,946	41.39%	New
Margin of victory		5,386	17.22%	
Turnout		31,278	69.33%	
Total valid votes		31,278		
Registered electors		45,112		
INC win (new seat)				

== See also ==
- List of constituencies of the Karnataka Legislative Assembly
