= G. Raghu Achar =

Indian National Congress political activist

Member of Karnataka Legislative Council
- In office 26 August 2013 – 5 January 2022
- Constituency: Chitradurga Local Authorities

Personal details
- Born: 10 May 1978 (age 48) Mysuru
- Party: Janata Dal (Secular) (2023–)
- Other political affiliations: Indian National Congress (–2023)

Govindchar Raghu Achar is a political activist and was a member of the Karnataka Legislative Council. He joined Janata Dal (Secular) in April 2023.

Achar was a former member of the Congress party and an ex-Member of the Legislative Council (MLC) who subsequently joined the Janata Dal (Secular) in Bengaluru. This decision was made after Achar's request for a ticket to contest the upcoming Assembly elections from Chitradurga was not granted.

== Controversy ==
On May 10, 2023, a team of electoral officials conducted a search at the residence of G Raghu Achar in Kyadigere on Tuesday night during which they confiscated Rs 58 lakh.

== See also ==
- TA/DA scam
