= K. V. Narayana Swamy =

Indian politician

Member of Karnataka Legislative Council
- In office June 2016 – June 2022

Personal details
- Party: Janata Dal (Secular)

K. V. Narayana Swamy is a Janata Dal (Secular) political activist and a member of the Karnataka Legislative Council.
