= Pradeep Shettar =

Indian politician

Member of Karnataka Legislative Council
- Incumbent
- Assumed office 6 January 2016
- Preceded by: Nagaraj Chabbi
- Constituency: Dharwad Local Authorities

Personal details
- Born: Pradeep Shettar Hubli, Dharwad district, Karnataka
- Spouse: Sneha Shettar
- Relations: Jagadish Shettar (brother)
- Parent: Shivappa Shettar (father)
- Education: B. E

Pradeep Shettar is an Indian politician who is currently a Member of Karnataka Legislative Council from Dharwad Local Authorities constituency since 6 January 2016. He is the brother of the former Chief Minister of Karnataka Jagadish Shettar.
