= Shashil G. Namoshi =

Indian politician

Member of Karnataka Legislative Council
- Incumbent
- Assumed office 10 November 2020
- Preceded by: Sharanappa Mattur
- Constituency: North East Teachers Constituency
- In office 1 July 1996 – 30 June 2014
- Succeeded by: Sharanappa Mattur
- Constituency: North East Teachers Constituency

Personal details
- Born: 21 September 1956 (age 69) Gulbarga, Karnataka
- Citizenship: Indian
- Party: Bharatiya Janata Party
- Spouse: Smt. Poornima
- Children: 1 Son- Praful, 2 Daughters
- Profession: Politician; Social Worker

Shashil Gangadhar Namoshi is an Indian politician who is the current member of the Karnataka Legislative Council, from North East Teachers Constituency from 10 November 2020. He is also the present chairman of the Hyderabad Karnataka Education Society.
