= Mudarangadi =

Indian village

Mudarangadi is a village in Kaup Taluk in Udupi District of Karnataka State, India. It belongs to Mysore division. It is located 26 km south of District headquarters Udupi and 352 km from State capital Bangalore.

Nearby villages include Kuthyaru, Santhuru, Kukkikatte, Yelluru, Pilar, Nandikoor, Inna, Belman, Palimaru, Padubidre and Shirva. Mudarangadi is surrounded by Karkal Taluk to the east, Mangalore Taluk to the south, Bantval Taluk to the south, Manjeshwar Taluk to the south. The nearest cities are Karkala, Moodubidre, Udupi and Mangalore.

It is close to the Arabian Sea. The predominant language in the village is Tulu, although Konkani and Kannada languages are also spoken.

== Transportation ==
Padubidri Railway Station is the closest to Mudarangadi. Mulki Railway Station (near to Mulki) is reachable from near by towns. The nearest major railway station is Mangalore Central Railway Station 42 km away.

Mudarangadi is easily accessible from Padubidre (8 km) and Uchila (12 km) by road.

It is also well connected to an international airport (Mangalore International Airport) at a distance of about 40 km.

== Education ==
1. St Francis Group of institutions (Kannada Medium & English Medium)
2. Govt P.U. College, Vidyanagara
