= Ramachandra Gowda =

Indian politician (1938–2026)

Cabinet Minister Government of Karnataka
- In office 30 May 2008 – 12 September 2010
- Ministry: Term
- Minister of Medical Education: 30 May 2008 – 12 September 2010
- In office 18 February 2006 – 8 October 2007
- Ministry: Term
- Minister of Sericulture: 21 June 2006 – 25 January 2007
- Minister of Planning & Statistics Department: 18 February 2006 – 8 October 2007
- Minister of Small Savings & Lottery: 18 February 2006 – 8 October 2007
- Minister of Science & Technology: 18 February 2006 – 8 October 2007

Deputy Chairman State Planning Board Government of Karnataka
- In office 23 September 2010 – 17 May 2012
- Preceded by: D. H. Shankaramurthy

Member of Karnataka Legislative Council
- In office 22 June 1988 – 21 June 2018
- Succeeded by: A. Devegowda
- Constituency: Bangalore Graduates

Personal details
- Born: 13 December 1938 Thippur, Tumkur district, Kingdom of Mysore, India
- Died: 14 July 2026 (aged 87) Bengaluru, Karnataka, India
- Party: Bharatiya Janata Party
- Spouse: Smt. Yashoda
- Profession: Engineer, Agriculturist

Ramachandra Gowda (Kannada: ರಾಮಚಂದ್ರ ಗೌಡ; 13 December 1938 – 14 July 2026) was an Indian politician who was a senior leader of the Bharatiya Janata Party (BJP) in Karnataka. Gowda took to social-political activities during his school days having been inspired by the Rashtriya Swayamsevak Sangh.

== Early life and career ==
Gowda participated in the Goa Liberation Movement when in high school. Later, he became an active member of the erstwhile Bharatiya Jana Sangh. He entered the Bangalore City Corporation as a Jana Sangh member in 1970. He was elected to the City Improvement Trust Board in the same year.

He was also the BJP State unit general secretary for a long period. He was first elected to the Karnataka Legislative Council from the Bangalore Graduates Constituency in 1988 and was re-elected three more times in 1994, 2000 and 2006. He held the portfolios of Small Savings, Mining & Geology and Science & Technology in the BJP and Janata Dal (Secular) coalition headed by H.D.Kumaraswamy. It was during his tenure as minister that the state imposed a ban on lottery. In the BJP Government headed by B.S. Yeddyurappa, he held the portfolio of Medical Education. He resigned in September 2010 after his name figured in a Medical Colleges recruitment scam for which high court gave a clean chit clearing all allegations. Subsequently, he was appointed the Deputy chairman of the State Planning Board.

== Personal life and death ==
Born on 13 December 1938 at Tippoor in Kunigal taluk of Tumkur district, he held an engineering degree. He has one son and one daughter, and died on 14 July 2026, at the age of 88.

== Sources ==
- Ramachandra gowda's personal website
