= M. Srinivas (politician, born 1945) =

Indian politician

Member of the Karnataka Legislative Council
- In office 15 June 2004 – 14 June 2016

Personal details
- Born: 30 January 1945 Narasimharajapura, Kingdom of Mysore (Now Chikmagalur district, Karnataka, India)
- Party: Janata Dal (Secular)
- Spouse: Malini Srinivas
- Children: 2
- Profession: Business (Industrialist)

Manjappa Srinivas (born 30 January 1945) is an Indian politician and former member of Karnataka Legislative Council from Janata Dal (Secular).
