= Hanumant Nirani =

Indian politician

Member of Karnataka Legislative Council
- Incumbent
- Assumed office 5 July 2016
- Preceded by: Mahantesh Shivanand Koujalgi
- Constituency: North West Graduates

Personal details
- Born: Hanumant Nirani; 1 June 1967 (age 58) Bilagi, Bijapur district, Mysore state (present-day Bagalkote district, Karnataka)
- Party: Bharatiya Janata Party
- Spouse: Shobha
- Relations: Murugesh Nirani (brother)
- Parent: Rudrappa Nirani (father)
- Education: M.Com., LLB

Hanumant Rudrappa Nirani is an Indian politician who has been a Member of the Karnataka Legislative Council from the North West Graduates constituency since 5 July 2016. He is the brother of Murugesh Nirani who was the Minister of Large and Medium Industries in the Government of Karnataka from 2021 to 2023.
