= Chandrashekhar B. Patil =

Indian politician

Chandrasekhar B. Patil

Member of the Karnataka Legislative Council
- Incumbent
- Assumed office 22 June 2018
- Preceded by: N. Amarnath Patil, BJP
- Constituency: Karnataka North-East Graduates

Personal details
- Born: Chandrashekhar Basavaraj Patil; 24 December 1970 (age 54); Humnabad, Bidar district, Mysuru State (present-day Karnataka), India
- Political party: Indian National Congress

Chandrashekhar Basavaraj Patil (born 24 December 1970) is a member of the Karnataka Legislative Council who belongs to the Indian National Congress. He won the Karnataka Legislative council seat by 321 votes against K.B. Srinivas of BJP in 2018.
