= Manohara Maski =

Indian politician

Member of Karnataka Legislative Council
- In office 22 June 2006 – 21 June 2012
- Succeeded by: Amarnath Patil
- Constituency: Karnataka North East Graduates

Personal details
- Born: 22 September 1961 (age 64) Maski, Raichur Karnataka
- Citizenship: Indian
- Party: Bharatiya Janata Party
- Spouse: Vedha Maski
- Children: 1 Son,
- Profession: Politician; Social Worker

Manohara Maski was a member of the Legislative Council of the state of Karnataka, India. He hails from the town of Raichur. He belongs to the Bharatiya Janata Party.
