= M. Shivanna =

Indian politician

Member of the Karnataka Legislative Council
- In office 1978 - 1982

Personal details
- Born: 10 June 1932 Mysore, Kingdom of Mysore, British India (present-day Karnataka, India)
- Died: 8 April 1993 (aged 60)
- Party: Indian National Congress

M. Shivanna was an Indian politician and a member of Karnataka Legislative Council. He was elected to the Karanataka Legislative Council in the bye-election from Karanataka Legislative Assembly in 1978 and remained in office till the end of his tenure. i.e., till 1982.
