= Yemakanmardi =

Yamakanmardi Yamakanmardi
- Village
- Temple entrance

- Location in Karnataka, India Yamakanmardi (India)
- Coordinates: 16.128°N 74.527°E
- Country: India
- State: Karnataka
- District: Belgaum
- Founder: Verupaxa Panta Maharaj
- Talukas: Hukeri

Population (2001)
  - Total: 8,545

Languages
  - Official: Kannada
- Time zone: UTC+5:30 (IST)
- ISO 3166 code: IN-KA
- Nearest city: Belgaum

Yamakanmardi is a village in the southern state of Karnataka, India. It is located in the Hukeri taluk of Belgaum district in Karnataka.

== Demographics ==
As of the 2001 Indian census, Yamakanmardi had a population of 8,545, with 4,288 males and 4,257 females.

== See also ==
- Belgaum
- Districts of Karnataka
