= N. Ravikumar =

Indian politician

Member (elect) of the Karnataka Legislative Council
- Assuming office 18 June 2018
- Succeeding: Somanna alias Swamilinga Bevinamarada, BJP

Chief Whip of the Opposition in the Karnataka Legislative Council
- Incumbent
- Assumed office 2023

Personal details
- Party: Bharatiya Janata Party

On 4 June 2018, N. Ravikumar was elected unopposed to the Karnataka Legislative Council. Out of 11 seats, the INC won 4 seats, JD(S) 2 and BJP 5. A full time worker of ABVP (Akila Bharathiya Vidyarthi Parishad) from his college days, he has been instrumental in many student related policies. He is serving as Chief Whip of the Opposition in the Karnataka Legislative Council and belong to the Koli caste of the Karnataka state.
