= Ivan D'Souza =

Indian politician

Member of Karnataka Legislative Council
- Incumbent
- Assumed office 18 June 2024
- Preceded by: Raghunath Rao Malkapure
- Constituency: Elected by MLAs

Personal details
- Born: 10 August 1965 (age 60) Mudarangady Udupi District
- Party: Indian National Congress
- Education: B.A, L.L.B from Mangalore University
- Website: Official Website

Ivan D'Souza (born 10 August 1965) is an Indian politician who is a member of Indian National Congress.

== Personal life ==
D'Souza was born on 10 August 1965 in Mudarangady, in Udupi District. D'Souza attended St. Francis Xavier Higher Primary School in Mudarangady, St. Mary’s High School in Shirva, then completed his PUC and graduation from St. Aloysius College Mangalore. He obtained his LLB graduate degree from SDM Law College in Mangalore to in 1989. He began his leadership through Indian Catholic Youth Movement (ICYM) organization from Mudarangady parish.

== Political career ==
D'Souza began his political career in 1992. D'Souza is currently a member of Indian National Congress. In 2008, D'Souza was named as the candidate of Indian National Congress for Mangalore South constituency. He was defeated by BJP candidate N. Yogish Bhat. D'Souza was a front runner to contest again from Mangalore South constituency in 2013 Karnataka State Elections. He is currently the KPCC Member and Convener of Election Committee for the Indian National Congress in Dakshina Kannada. He has taken part in protests against the government, particularly when there were attacks against Christians in 2008 at South Kannara.

D'Souza led the protests against the injustice and subsequent inaction by the state government and also when some women were attacked in a reported moral policing incident.

Recently when there was confusion pertaining to Congress guarantees, he stated that is meant for all in principles.

D'Souza was a member of the Karnataka Legislative Council until 2020.

He was re-elected to Karnataka Legislative Council in 2024.
