= K. Govindaraj =

Indian politician

Member of Karnataka Legislative Council
- Incumbent
- Assumed office June 2012

President of FIBA Asia

Personal details
- Born: 1 September 1959 (age 65); Bengaluru
- Political party: Indian National Congress

Kempa Govindaraj is a politician and sports administrator from Karnataka, India. He is a member of the Karnataka Legislative Council, representing the Indian National Congress.

== Early life ==
Govindaraj hails from Bangalore. He played sports during his college days. He is a post graduate in political science and also did a diploma in public relations.

== Political career ==
Govindaraj began his political journey in 1999 contesting the Shivajinagar Assembly constituency as a candidate of the Indian National Congress. He lost the 1999 Karnataka Legislative Assembly Election losing to Katta Subramanya Naidu of BJP by a margin of 10,553 votes. He was first elected to the Legislative Assembly constituency in 2012. He served as the parliamentary secretary to the Chief Minister of Karnataka Siddaramaiah from 2015 to 2018. He is also the political secretary of Chief Minister Siddaramaiah again during the Congress government from 2023. He also held the position as Syndicate Member, Kuvempu University and government nominee on the board of directors of Bangalore Water Supply Sewage Board (BWSSB). In the late nineties, he served as an Officer on Special Duty in the Legislative Council for chairman D. B. Kalmakar. In February 2017, Income Tax department held a raid at his residence. He is reportedly close to the Congress Party leaders and is said to be one of the party's fund raisers.

== Career as sports administrator ==
Govindaraj is also serving as the as president of FIBA Asia from 2023 to 2027 on a rotation basis as a nominee of South Asian Basketball Association. Earlier, he also held the post of the president of the Basketball Federation of India from 2023 to 2024 and the Karnataka Olympic Association. The other roles he held as sports administrator include secretary, Karnataka State Basketball Association and member of Sports Authority of Karnataka. He was the selection committee member for Indian basketball teams during 2000 to 2007.

== Awards ==
- Karnataka State Dasara awardee for the best sports promoter in the year 1993.
- Indira Priyadarshini award for outstanding contribution to social service and sports, 2006.
