= S. R. Patil =

Indian politician (born 1948)

Shivanagowda Rudragowda Patil

Minister of Infrastructure, Information Technology, Biotechnology, Science & Technology, Planning and Statistics of Karnataka
- In office May 2013 – May 2018

Leader of the House in Karnataka Legislative Council
- In office 5 May 2013 – 1 July 2016 9 October 2019-
- Preceded by: D. V. Sadananda Gowda
- Succeeded by: G. Parameshwara

Leader of the Opposition in Karnataka Legislative Council
- In office 28 June 2012 – 5 May 2013
- Preceded by: Motamma
- Succeeded by: D. V. Sadananda Gowda

Personal details
- Born: 31 July 1948 (age 78) Badagandi, Bilgi Taluka, Bagalkot district, Mysuru State (present-day Karnataka), India
- Party: Indian National Congress
- Spouse: Uma Patil
- Children: Anusha Patil

Shivanagowda Rudragowda Patil (Kannada:ಶಿವನಗೌಡ ರುದ್ರಗೌಡ ಪಾಟೀಲ್) Popularly known as R. S. Patil, is a veteran Indian politician from Karnataka. He was born 31 August 1948 in Badagandi, Bilgi, Bagalkot was the minister for Infrastructure, information technology, biotechnology, science and technology, planning and statistics in the Government of Karnataka. A senior congressman, he is the leader of the opposition in the Karnataka Legislative Council.

A senior leader of the Indian National Congress (INC), he is best known for his tenure as the Member of Parliament (MP) for the Bagalkot constituency during the 13th Lok Sabha (1999–2004). He hails from the Ron region and has been a significant figure in North Karnataka politics for decades.

== Early life and background ==
He was born circa 1933 in the Bagalkot district of what was then the Mysore State (now Karnataka). He was born into a prominent agricultural family, the son of Sanganagouda Patil, and was raised in the Ron region of North Karnataka. This area is historically significant for its agrarian economy and the influential political presence of the Lingayat community, which shaped his early social and political outlook.

== Legacy ==
R. S. Patil is remembered as a key figure who held the Bagalkot seat for the Congress party before the region shifted towards being a BJP stronghold under P. C. Gaddigoudar. His victory in 1999 marked one of the last major Congress wins in that specific Lok Sabha seat for over two decades.

Before entering national politics, Patil was deeply involved in local governance and community leadership within the Ron and Bagalkot belts. His upbringing in a region characterized by its dependence on the Malaprabha and Ghataprabha river basins reportedly influenced his later political focus on irrigation and rural development. By the time he contested the 1999 General Elections, he had established himself as a seasoned grassroots leader within the Indian National Congress, eventually representing the constituency at the age of 66.
