= Shambulingaiah Ravi =

Member of Karnataka Legislative Council (born 1967)

S. Ravi

Member of Karnataka Legislative Council
- Incumbent
- Assumed office 6 January 2016
- Constituency: Bangalore Rural Local Authorities

Personal details
- Born: 1 December 1967 (age 58)
- Party: Indian National Congress
- Spouse: S P Pushpalatha
- Children: Siri Ravi, Nidhi Ravi, Tejas Ravi

Shambulingaiah Ravi is an Indian National Congress activist, member of Karnataka Legislative Council and the president of Bangalore DCC Bank. He is a relative of Current Chief Minister of Karnataka, D. K. Shivakumar.

== See also ==
- TA/DA scam
