= S. L. Bhojegowda =

Indian politician

S.L. Bhojegowda

Member of the Karnataka Legislative Council
- Incumbent
- Assumed office 22 June 2018
- Preceded by: Capt. Ganesh Karnik, BJP
- Constituency: Karnataka South West Teachers

Personal details
- Party: Janata Dal (Secular)

S. L. Bhojegowda belongs to the Janata Dal (Secular).
