= D. S. Veeraiah =

Indian politician

Member of Karnataka Legislative Council
- In office 18 June 2006 – 17 June 2018
- Constituency: elected by Legislative Assembly members

Personal details
- Born: 2 January 1946 (age 80) Kadu Kothanahalli, Mandya district, Karnataka
- Party: Bharatiya Janata Party
- Spouse: S Rajeshwari
- Parent: Siddaiah (father)
- Education: M.com, L.L.B., D.G., D.Pm., A.R.

D. S. Veeraiah is an Indian politician from the Bharatiya Janata Party, Karnataka who was the Member of Legislative Council from 2006 to 2018. He had contested the 2009 Indian general election from Kolar and lost to K. H. Muniyappa of the Congress by a margin of 23,006 votes.
