= Karnataka Legislative Council =

Upper house of the state legislature of Karnataka

Karnataka Legislative Council Karnāṭaka Vidhāna Pariṣattu
- Emblem of Karnataka

- Flag of India

Type
- Type: Upper house of the Karnataka Legislature
- Term limits: 6 years

History
- Founded: 19 December 1956 (69 years ago)
- Preceded by: Mysore Legislative Council

Leadership
- Chairperson: Saleem Ahmed, INC since 14 August 2026
- Deputy Chairperson: Umashree, INC since 17 August 2026
- Leader of the House: Yathindra Siddaramaiah, INC since 13 August 2026
- Govt Chief Whip: Manjunath Bhandari, INC since 21 November 2026
- Leader of the Opposition: Chalavadi Narayanaswamy, BJP since 23 July 2024
- Secretary of the Legislative Council: K. R. Mahalaxmi since 1 October 2017

Structure
- Seats: 75 (64 Elected + 11 Nominated)
- Political groups: Government (39) INDIA (39): INC (38); IND (1); Official Opposition (31) NDA (31): BJP (24); JD(S) (7); Vacant (5) Vacant (5)

Meeting place
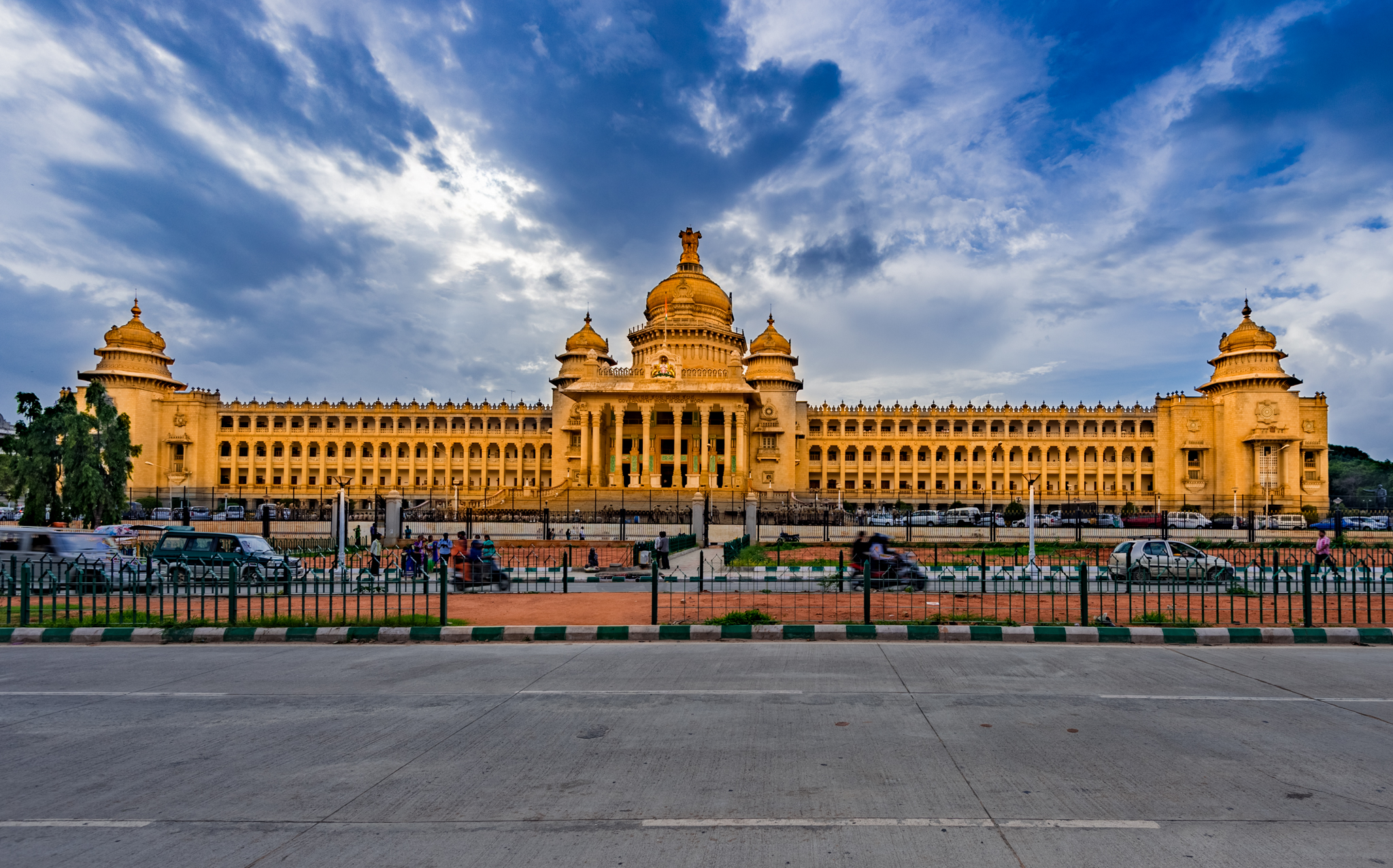
- Legislative Council, Vidhana Soudha, Bengaluru, Bengaluru Urban district, Karnataka, India
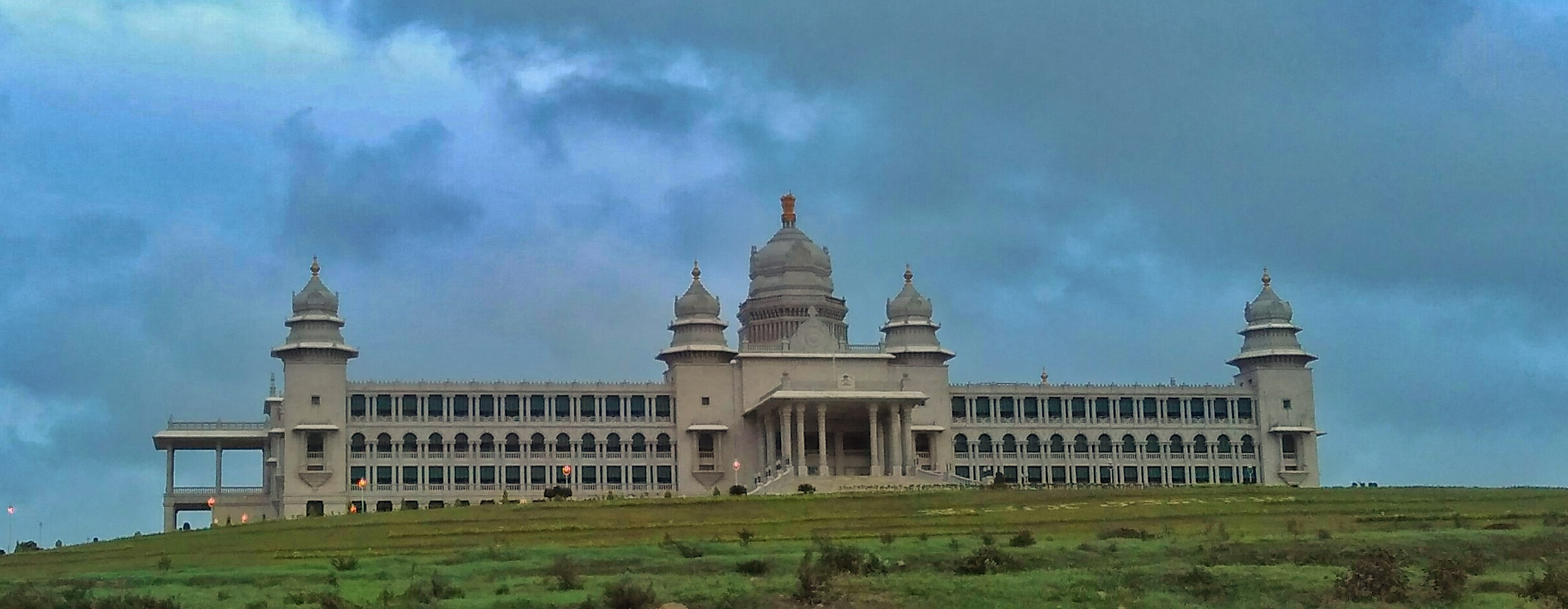
- Legislative Council, Suvarna Vidhana Soudha, Belagavi, Belagavi district, Karnataka, India (Winter session)

Website
- Karnataka Legislative Council

Constitution
- Constitution of India

Footnotes
- The Council was established in 1907 for the princely state of Mysore, which was merged with the Union of India and became Mysore State in 1947; Mysore State was re-organized to its current territorial state in 1956 and renamed as Karnataka on 1 November 1973.

The Karnataka Legislative Council (formerly the Mysore Legislative Council) is the upper house of the state legislature of Karnataka in India. Karnataka is one of six Indian states with a bicameral legislature; the Legislative Assembly is the lower house. The Council is a permanent body of 75 members, of whom 64 are elected in various ways in staggered elections and 11 are appointed by the Governor of Karnataka. Members hold their seats for six-year terms.

== History ==
Originally, the government of the princely state of Mysore comprised the diwan and the unicameral Mysore Representative Assembly (constituted in 1881 by Maharaja Chamarajendra Wadiyar X). With the intent of creating a body composed of a certain number of non-official persons with practical experience and knowledge of local conditions to assist the government in making laws and regulations, the Mysore Legislative Council was established by Regulation I of 1907, in the reign of Krishna Raja Wadiyar IV. In addition to the diwan, the president and the members of the Council, who were ex-officio members, the Council at that time consisted of not less than 10 and not more than 15 additional members to be nominated by the government and approved by the Maharaja, out of which not less than two-fifths were required to be non-officials. The minimum and maximum number of additional members was increased from 15 to 21 respectively by Regulation I of 1914 and the maximum was further increased to 30 by Regulation II of 1919.

In 1923, under the Mysore Legislative Council Regulation, (Regulation XIX of 1923), the strength of the Council was fixed at 50. Of the 50 seats, 28 were allotted to the nominated members (20 official and 8 non-official) and 22 to elected members. In 1914, the Council was empowered to discuss the state budget, and in 1923 it was given power to vote on the demands for grants. From 1919 onwards, resolutions were discussed in the Council. The term of the Council was three years in 1917 and four years in 1940.

After the implementation of the States Reorganisation Act, 1956, the strength of the Legislative Council of the re-organized Mysore State was increased to 63 under the Legislative Councils Act of 1957 and remained as such until 1987. The council was renamed following the renaming of Mysore State as Karnataka in 1973. Following adoption of a resolution in Karnataka Legislative Assembly on 18 August 1986 and subsequent approval by the Parliament of India, the strength of Legislative Council was increased to 75 with effect from 8 September 1987.

== Constituencies and Members ==
The Karnataka Legislative Council is a permanent body with one-third of its members retiring every two years. Members of Legislative Council (MLCs) serve six-year terms, with no limit on reelections.

Of the 75 members of the Council, 25 are elected by local authorities such as municipalities and corporations, 25 are elected by members of the Legislative Assembly, 7 are elected from graduates' constituencies, 7 are elected from teachers' constituencies, and 11 members are nominated by the Governor of Karnataka. The following is the list of the current members:

=== Members elected by Legislative Assembly (25) ===
Keys: INC (15) BJP (8) JD(S) (2)

| # | Member | Party | Alliance | Term start | Term end |
|---|---|---|---|---|---|
| 1 | B. K. Hariprasad | INC | INDIA | 1-Jul-2026 | 30-Jun-2032 |
| 2 | P. V. Mohan | INC | INDIA | 1-Jul-2026 | 30-Jun-2032 |
| 3 | Tippannappa Kamaknoor | INC | INDIA | 1 July 2026 | 30-Jun-2032 |
| 4 | Shivanna Malavalli | INC | INDIA | 1 July 2026 | 30-Jun-2032 |
| 5 | Vinay Karthik Prakash | INC | INDIA | 1-Jul-2026 | 30-Jun-2032 |
| 6 | N. S. Boseraju | INC | INDIA | 18-Jun-2024 | 17-Jun-2030 |
| 7 | Yathindra Siddaramaiah | INC | INDIA | 18-Jun-2024 | 17-Jun-2030 |
| 8 | K. Govindaraj | INC | INDIA | 18-Jun-2024 | 17-Jun-2030 |
| 9 | A. Vasanth Kumar | INC | INDIA | 18-Jun-2024 | 17-Jun-2030 |
| 10 | Bilkis Bano | INC | INDIA | 18-Jun-2024 | 17-Jun-2030 |
| 11 | Ivan D'Souza | INC | INDIA | 18-Jun-2024 | 17-Jun-2030 |
| 12 | Jagdev Guttedar | INC | INDIA | 18-Jun-2024 | 17-Jun-2030 |
| 13 | M. Nagaraju Yadav | INC | INDIA | 14-Jun-2022 | 13-Jun-2028 |
| 14 | K. Abdul Jabbar | INC | INDIA | 14-Jun-2022 | 13-Jun-2028 |
| 15 | Basanagouda Badarli | INC | INDIA | 11-Jul-2024 | 13-Jun-2028 |
| 16 | Raghu Kautilya | BJP | NDA | 1-Jul-2026 | 30-Jun-2032 |
| 17 | Lingaraj Patil | BJP | NDA | 1-Jul-2026 | 30-Jun-2032 |
| 18 | C. T. Ravi | BJP | NDA | 18-Jun-2024 | 17-Jun-2030 |
| 19 | N. Ravikumar | BJP | NDA | 18-Jun-2024 | 17-Jun-2030 |
| 20 | Marutirao Muley | BJP | NDA | 18-Jun-2024 | 17-Jun-2030 |
| 21 | S. Keshava Prasad | BJP | NDA | 14-Jun-2022 | 13-Jun-2028 |
| 22 | Hemalatha Nayak | BJP | NDA | 14-Jun-2022 | 13-Jun-2028 |
| 23 | Chalavadi Narayanaswamy | BJP | NDA | 14-Jun-2022 | 13-Jun-2028 |
| 24 | T. N. Javarayi Gowda | JD(S) | NDA | 18-Jun-2024 | 17-Jun-2030 |
| 25 | T. A. Sharavana | JD(S) | NDA | 14-Jun-2022 | 13-Jun-2028 |

=== Local Authorities constituencies (25) ===
Keys: INC (12) BJP (10) JD(S) (2) IND (1)

| # | Constituency | Member | Party | Term start | Term end |
|---|---|---|---|---|---|
| 1 | Bidar | Bhimrao Patil | INC | 6-Jan-2022 | 5-Jan-2028 |
| 2 | Kalaburagi–Yadgir | B. G. Patil | BJP | 6-Jan-2022 | 5-Jan-2028 |
| 3 | Bijapur–Bagalkot | Sunil Gouda B. Patil | INC | 6-Jan-2022 | 5-Jan-2028 |
| 4 | Bijapur–Bagalkot | P. H. Poojara | BJP | 6-Jan-2022 | 5-Jan-2028 |
| 5 | Belgaum | Channaraj Hattiholi | INC | 6-Jan-2022 | 5-Jan-2028 |
| 6 | Belgaum | Lakhan Jarakiholi | IND | 6-Jan-2022 | 5-Jan-2028 |
| 7 | Uttara Kannada | Ganapathi Ulvekar | BJP | 6-Jan-2022 | 5-Jan-2028 |
| 8 | Dharwad–Gadag–Haveri | Saleem Ahmed | INC | 6-Jan-2022 | 5-Jan-2028 |
| 9 | Dharwad–Gadag–Haveri | Pradeep Shettar | BJP | 6-Jan-2022 | 5-Jan-2028 |
| 10 | Raichur–Koppal | Sharana Gowda Patil | INC | 6-Jan-2022 | 5-Jan-2028 |
| 11 | Bellary–Vijaynagar | Y. M. Satish | BJP | 6-Jan-2022 | 5-Jan-2028 |
| 12 | Chitradurga–Davangere | K. S. Naveen | BJP | 6-Jan-2022 | 5-Jan-2028 |
| 13 | Shivamogga | D. S. Arun | BJP | 6-Jan-2022 | 5-Jan-2028 |
| 14 | Dakshina Kannada–Udupi | Kishore B. R. | BJP | 21-Oct-2024 | 5-Jan-2028 |
| 15 | Dakshina Kannada–Udupi | Manjunath Bhandari | INC | 6-Jan-2022 | 5-Jan-2028 |
| 16 | Chikmagaluru | A. V. Gayatri Shanthegowda | INC | 16-Jul-2026 | 5-Jan-2028 |
| 17 | Hassan | Suraj Revanna | JD(S) | 6-Jan-2022 | 5-Jan-2028 |
| 18 | Tumakuru | R. Rajendra | INC | 6-Jan-2022 | 5-Jan-2028 |
| 19 | Mandya | M. G. Gooligowda | INC | 6-Jan-2022 | 5-Jan-2028 |
| 20 | Bengaluru Urban | H. S. Gopinath Reddy | BJP | 6-Jan-2022 | 5-Jan-2028 |
| 21 | Bengaluru Rural–Ramanagar | Shambulingaiah Ravi | INC | 6-Jan-2022 | 5-Jan-2028 |
| 22 | Kolar–Chikkaballapur | Anil Kumar | INC | 6-Jan-2022 | 5-Jan-2028 |
| 23 | Kodagu | Suja Kushalappa | BJP | 6-Jan-2022 | 5-Jan-2028 |
| 24 | Mysuru–Chamarajanagara | C. N. Manje Gowda | JD(S) | 6-Jan-2022 | 5-Jan-2028 |
| 25 | Mysuru–Chamarajanagara | D. Thimmaiah | INC | 6-Jan-2022 | 5-Jan-2028 |

=== Elected from Graduates constituencies (7) ===
Keys: BJP (4) INC(3)

| # | Constituency | Member | Party | Term start | Term end |
|---|---|---|---|---|---|
| 1 | Karnataka South-East Graduates | K. M. Suresh | BJP | 10-Nov-2026 | 9-Nov-2032 |
| 2 | Karnataka North-East Graduates | Chandrasekhar Patil | INC | 22-Jun-2024 | 21-Jun-2030 |
| 3 | Karnataka North-West Graduates | Hanumant Nirani | BJP | 5-Jul-2022 | 4-Jul-2028 |
| 4 | Karnataka South Graduates | Madhu Madhe Gowda | INC | 5-Jul-2022 | 4-Jul-2028 |
| 5 | Karnataka West Graduates | S. V. Sankanura | BJP | 10-Nov-2026 | 9-Nov-2032 |
| 6 | Bangalore Graduates | Dr. Ramoji Gowda | INC | 22-Jun-2024 | 21-Jun-2030 |
| 7 | Karnataka South-West Graduates | Dhananjaya Sarji | BJP | 22-Jun-2024 | 21-Jun-2030 |

=== Elected from Teachers constituencies (7) ===
Keys: JD(S) (3) BJP (2) INC (2)

| # | Constituency | Member | Party | Term start | Term end |
|---|---|---|---|---|---|
| 1 | Karnataka South Teachers | K. Vivekananda | JD(S) | 22-Jun-2024 | 21-Jun-2030 |
| 2 | Karnataka South-East Teachers | D. T. Srinivas Yadav | INC | 8-Jun-2024 | 9-Jun-2030 |
| 3 | Karnataka North-East Teachers | Shashil G. Namoshi | BJP | 10-Nov-2026 | 9-Nov-2032 |
| 4 | Bangalore Teachers | A. P. Ranganath | JD(S) | 10-Nov-2026 | 9-Nov-2032 |
| 5 | Karnataka West Teachers | Basavaraj Horatti | BJP | 5-Jul-2022 | 4-Jul-2028 |
| 6 | Karnataka North-West Teachers | Prakash Hukkeri | INC | 5-Jul-2022 | 4-Jul-2028 |
| 7 | Karnataka South-West Teachers | S. L. Bhojegowda | JD(S) | 22-Jun-2024 | 21-Jun-2030 |

=== Nominated by the Governor (11) ===
Keys: INC (6)

- Vacant (5)

| # | Member | Party | Term start | Term end |
|---|---|---|---|---|
| 1 | Arathi Krishna | INC | 10-Sep-2025 | 09-Sep-2031 |
| 2 | K. Shivakumar | INC | 10-Sep-2025 | 09-Sep-2031 |
| 3 | F. H. Jakkappanavar | INC | 10-Sep-2025 | 09-Sep-2031 |
| 4 | Umashree | INC | 21-Aug-2023 | 20-Aug-2029 |
| 5 | M. R. Seetharam | INC | 21-Aug-2023 | 20-Aug-2029 |
| 6 | H. P. Sudham Das | INC | 21-Aug-2023 | 20-Aug-2029 |
| 7 | | | | |
| 8 | | | | |
| 9 | | | | |
| 10 | | | | |
| 11 | | | | |

== See also ==
- List of members of the Karnataka Legislative Council, current and past
- Chairperson of the Karnataka Legislative Council
- Karnataka Legislative Assembly
