= H. C. Mahadevappa =

Indian politician

- ಎಚ್‌. ಸಿ. ಮಹದೇವಪ್ಪ
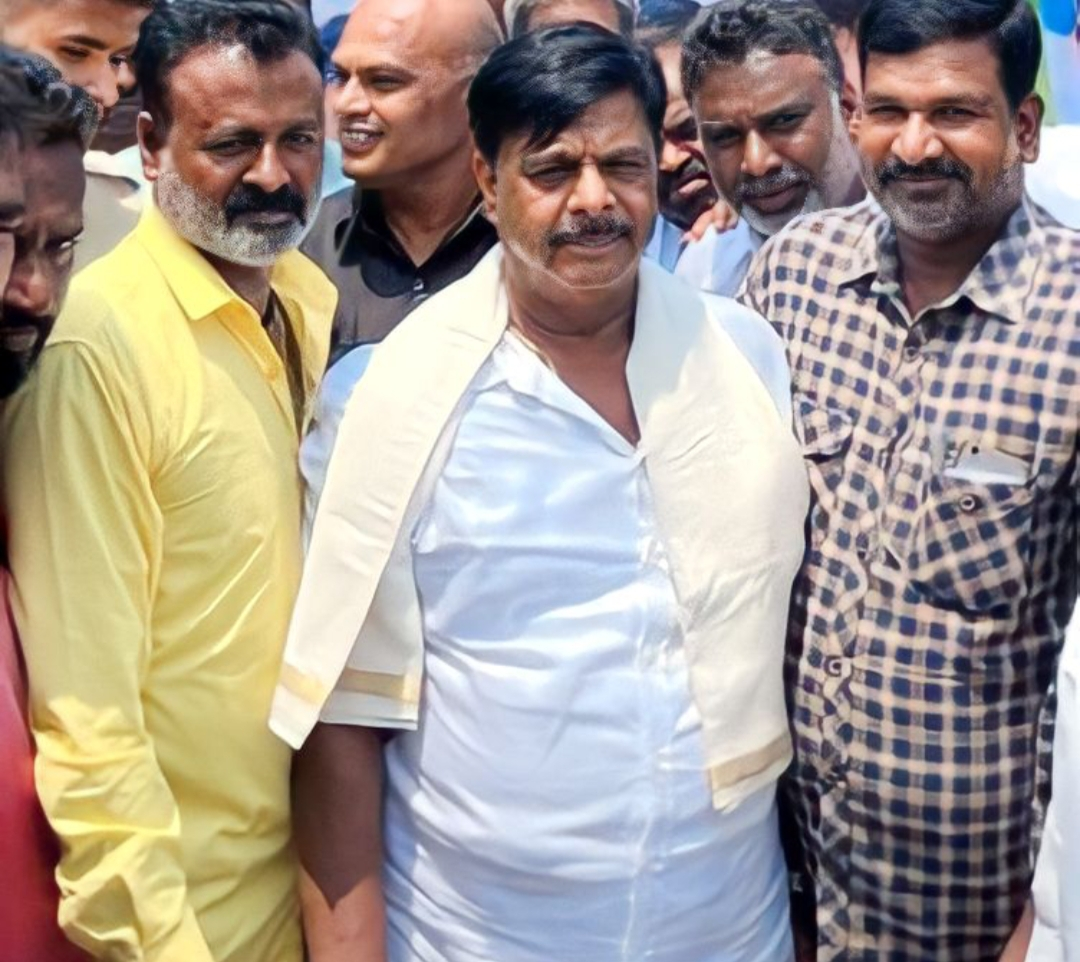
- Mahadevappa (centre) in 2023

Cabinet Minister, Government of Karnataka
- In office 27 May 2023 – 29 May 2026
- Governor: Thawarchand Gehlot
- Cabinet: Second Siddaramaiah ministry
- Chief Minister: Siddaramaiah
- Ministry and Departments: Social Welfare
- Succeeded by: K. H. Muniyappa
- In office 2013–2018
- Governor: H. R. Bhardwaj (24 June 2009 – 28 June 2014) Konijeti Rosaiah (29 June 2014 – 31 August 2014) Vajubhai Vala (1 September 2014 – 15 May 2018)
- Cabinet: First Siddaramaiah ministry
- Chief Minister: Siddaramaiah
- Ministry and Departments: Public Works Department; Ports; Inland Transport
- Succeeded by: H. D. Revanna (Public Works Department); R. B. Timmapur (Ports & Inland Transport)

Member of Karnataka Legislative Assembly
- Incumbent
- Assumed office May 2023
- Preceded by: Ashvin Kumar M
- Constituency: T. Narasipur
- In office 2004–2018
- Preceded by: Bharathi Shankar
- Succeeded by: Ashvin Kumar M
- Constituency: T. Narasipur

Personal details
- Born: April 20, 1953 (age 73) Hadinaru
- Party: Indian National Congress
- Education: JJM Medical College
- Occupation: Politician

H. C. Mahadevappa is an Indian politician from Karnataka and a six-term member of the Karnataka Legislative Assembly. A member of the Indian National Congress, he represents T. Narasipur Assembly constituency in Mysore district. He previously belonged to the Janata Party, Janata Dal and Janata Dal (Secular).

He served as Karnataka's Minister for Social Welfare from May 2023 to May 2026 in the Second Siddaramaiah ministry, and as Minister for Public Works, Ports and Inland Transport from 2013 to 2018 in the First Siddaramaiah ministry. He held earlier ministerial responsibilities in health and rural development.

== Early life and education ==
Mahadevappa was born on 20 April 1953 in Hadinaru village, in the Nanjangud taluk of present-day Mysuru district. He completed an Bachelor of Medicine, Bachelor of Surgery (MBBS) degree at JJM Medical College, Davanagere, in 1999.

He is married to Mahadevamma. Their son Sunil Bose was elected to the Lok Sabha from Chamarajanagar in the 2024 election.

== Political career ==
Mahadevappa began his political career with the Janata Party, later joining the Janata Dal and subsequently the Janata Dal (Secular). In 1985, he won from the T. Narasipur constituency.

From 1994 to 1999, he served as the Health and Family Welfare Minister in the governments led by H. D. Deve Gowda and J. H. Patel.

During the 2004 Congress-JD(S) coalition government, Mahadevappa held the Rural Development and Panchayat Raj portfolio.

In 2008, he joined the Indian National Congress (INC).

From 2008 to 2018, Mahadevappa represented the T. Narasipur constituency and served as the public works minister in Siddaramaiah’s government from 2013 to 2018.

In 2023, he was appointed an MLA from the T. Narasipur constituency. He is also the social welfare minister under Chief Minister K. Siddaramaiah's cabinet.

He represents the T. Narasipur constituency in Karnataka and serves as the cabinet minister for public works in the Karnataka government under Chief Minister K. Siddaramaiah.

Mahadevappa has engaged in various initiatives aimed at infrastructure development, social welfare, and community empowerment within Karnataka.

== Awards and recognition ==
During H. C. Mahadevappa's tenure as Minister of the Public Works Department, the Karnataka State Highway Improvement Project (KSHIP) received the iRAP International Award for excellence in road safety initiatives in the Asia-Pacific region. The award was presented by the Global Road Safety Facility (GRSF) in association with the World Bank (WB).

== Works ==
Mahadevappa contributed to infrastructure development in Karnataka through the following projects: Dharwad High Court.
