= M. Sathyanarayana =

Indian politician (died 2019)

MLA of Chamundeshwari
- In office 2008–2013
- Preceded by: Siddaramaiah
- Succeeded by: GT Devegowda

Personal details
- Born: 1944/45
- Died: 6 June 2019
- Party: Indian National Congress

M. Sathyanarayana was an Indian politician belonging to Indian National Congress. He was elected as a member of Karnataka Legislative Assembly from Chamundeshwari in 2008. He died on 6 June 2019 at the age of 74.
