= N. S. Boseraju =

Indian politician

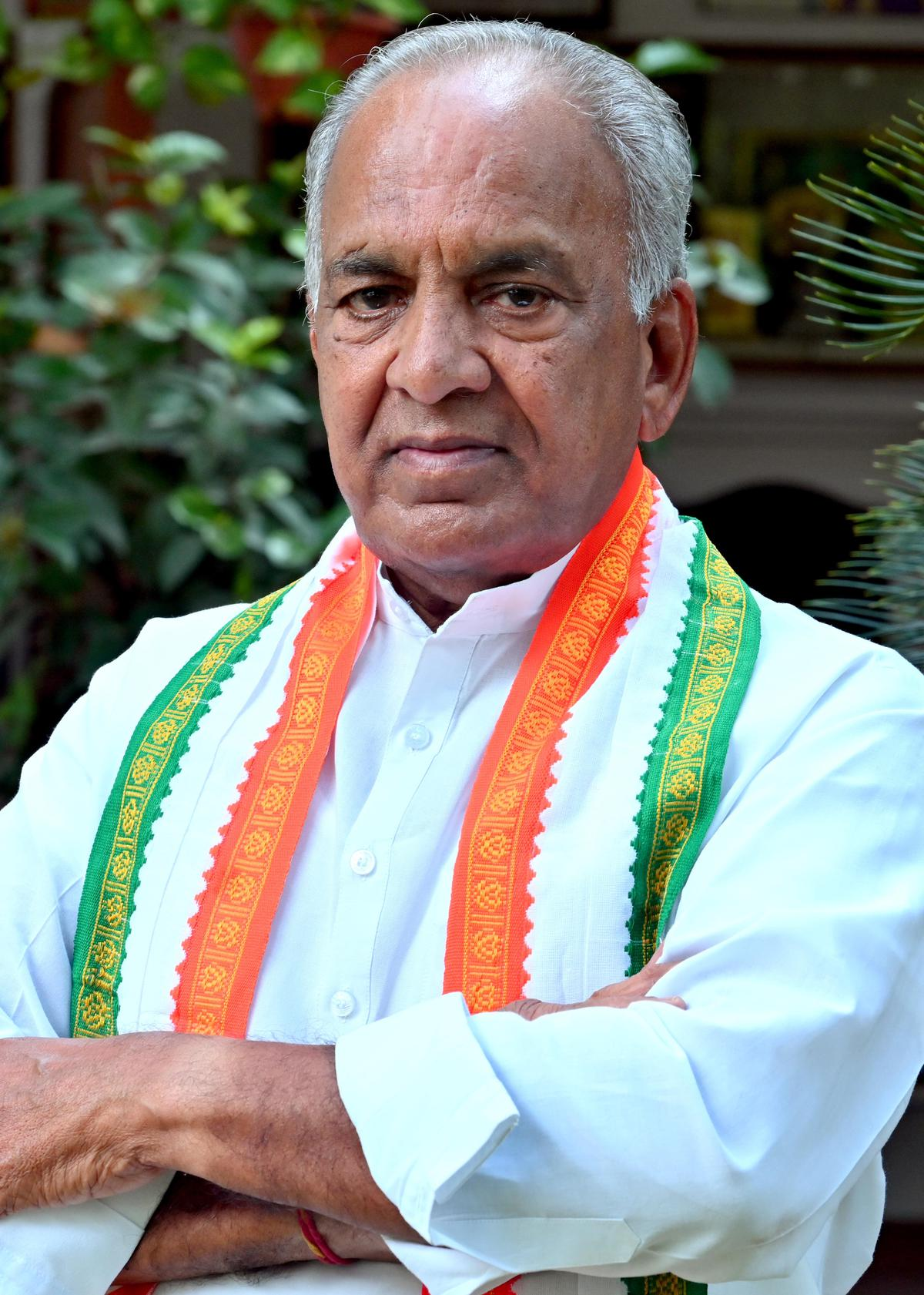

Cabinet Minister, Government of Karnataka
- In office 27 May 2023 – 29 May 2026
- Governor: Thawarchand Gehlot
- Cabinet: Second Siddaramaiah ministry
- Chief Minister: Siddaramaiah
- Ministry and Departments: Minor Irrigation; Science & Technology

Leader of the House Karnataka Legislative Council
- In office 3 July 2023 – 13 August 2026
- Chairperson & Dy Chair: Basavaraj Horrati & MK Pranesh
- Preceded by: Kota Srinivas Poojary
- Succeeded by: Yathindra Siddaramaiah

Member of Karnataka Legislative Council
- Incumbent
- Assumed office 23 June 2023
- Preceded by: Baburao Chinchansur
- In office 1 July 2014 – 30 June 2020

Member of Karnataka Legislative Assembly
- In office 1999–2008
- Preceded by: Gangadhar Naik
- Succeeded by: G. Hampayya Nayak
- Constituency: Manvi

Personal details
- Party: Indian National Congress
- Spouse: Krishna Veni

Nadimpalli S. Boseraju is an Indian politician of the Indian National Congress politician and a member of the Karnataka Legislative Council. He previously represented Manvi Assembly constituency for two consecutive terms from 1999 to 2008.

Boseraju served as the Minister for Minor Irrigation and Science and Technology in the Second Siddaramaiah ministry from May 2023 to May 2026. He was also the Leader of the House in the Karnataka Legislative Council from July 2023 to August 2026.

== Positions held ==
- 2018 - Appointed as AICC Secretary in-charge of Telangana state.

== See also ==
- TA/DA scam
