= K. Harishkumar =

Indian politician

Member of the Karnataka Legislative Council
- In office 18 June 2018 – 17 June 2024
- Preceded by: Motamma
- Succeeded by: Yathindra Siddaramaiah

Personal details
- Party: Indian National Congress

K. Harishkumar was one of the eleven people appointed as a member of Karnataka Legislative Council by the governor of Karnataka. K. Harish Kumar

Ex–Member of Legislative Council (MLC) President, Dakshina Kannada District Congress Committee Chairman, MESCOM (State Minister Cadre), Government of Karnataka Political Journey & Career Overview

Shri K. Harish Kumar is a senior Congress leader with over four decades of dedicated public service, having joined the Indian National Congress in 1978 as a grassroots worker. His political journey reflects unwavering commitment to the party ideology, farmers’ welfare, and public development.

He actively worked in the historic Chikkamagaluru by-election of 1978, where Smt. Indira Gandhi contested—an experience that shaped his political vision and commitment.

---

Key Party Positions Held

President, Youth Congress, Belthangady Block (1980–1984)

Member, Land Tribunal, Belthangady (1981–1983)

President, Block Congress Committee, Belthangady

(1984–1986 & 2004–2017)

Vice President, District Youth Congress, Dakshina Kannada (1986–1990)

Zilla Parishad Member (1987–1992)

Chairman, Works Committee (1989–1991)

General Secretary, District Congress Committee (1993–2000)

Co-Chairman, District Congress Kisan Cell (2000–2002)

President, Dakshina Kannada District Congress Committee (2017 – Present)

---

Legislative & Electoral Experience

Allotted Congress Assembly ticket in 1989; B-Form issued but cancelled at the final stage

Contested 2004 Assembly Election from Belthangady Constituency; narrowly lost

Elected as Member of the Legislative Council (MLC) from Assembly quota

Term: 2018 – 2024

---

Academic & Institutional Roles

Member, Academic Council

(2004–2007 & 2021–2024)

---

Service to Agriculture & Cooperative Sector

Elected Member, Agricultural Cooperative Society, Belthangady

(1987–1992 & 2008–2013)

President, Cooperative Agricultural Society, Belthangady

(2008–2011)

---

Current Responsibility

Chairman, MESCOM

The Government of Karnataka has upgraded the MESCOM Chairmanship to State Minister Cadre, recognizing his administrative capability and leadership.
