= Siddaramanahundi =

Village in Mysore taluka & Mysore district Karnataka

- Village
- Location within Karnataka Location within India
- Coordinates: 12°12′55″N 76°48′47″E
- Country: India
- State: Karnataka
- District: Mysore
- Taluka (Tehsil): Mysore

Government
  - Type: Gram Panchayat
  - Body: Siddaramanahundi Gram Panchayat

Siddaramanahundi is a village in Varuna Hobli of Mysore district in the Indian state of Karnataka. The village is located approximately 23 kilometers from Mysore city and has become widely recognised as the birthplace of Siddaramaiah, the former Chief Minister of Karnataka.

== Geography and administration ==
Siddaramanahundi is situated in Varuna Hobli, which falls under the Mysore taluka of Mysore district. The village is part of the Varuna assembly constituency, currently represented by Siddaramaiah in the Karnataka Legislative Assembly. The postal code for the area is 570010.

== Demographics and economy ==
Siddaramanahundi is a small rural village with a predominantly agricultural economy. The village is home to farming families primarily engaged in traditional agriculture.

== Culture and religion ==
The Siddarameshwara temple is situated in the village, which serves as a family deity temple for the local community.

== Infrastructure and development ==
Transportation connectivity has improved, with better road networks linking the village to Mysore and other districts. The village's location within the Varuna constituency has facilitated infrastructure development and government attention due to its political significance.

== Notable people ==
- Siddaramaiah, Chief Minister of Karnataka (2013–2018; 2023–2026)
