= Varuna Assembly constituency =

Legislative Assembly constituency in Karnataka, India

Coordinates: 12.3°N 76.7°E

Varuna
- Constituency No. 219 for the Karnataka Legislative Assembly
- Map of Vidhan Sabha constituency

Constituency details
- Country: India
- Region: South India
- State: Karnataka
- District: Mysore
- Lok Sabha constituency: Chamarajanagar
- Established: 2008
- Total electors: 234,533 (2023)
- Reservation: None

Member of Legislative Assembly
- 16th Karnataka Legislative Assembly
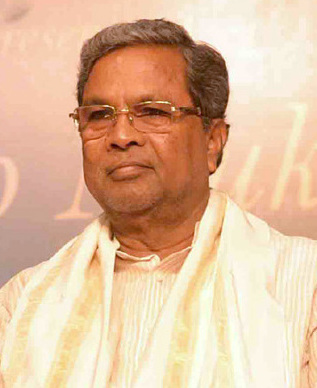
- Incumbent Siddaramaiah
- Party: INC
- Alliance: I.N.D.I.A.
- Elected year: 2023
- Preceded by: Dr. Yatindra S. INC

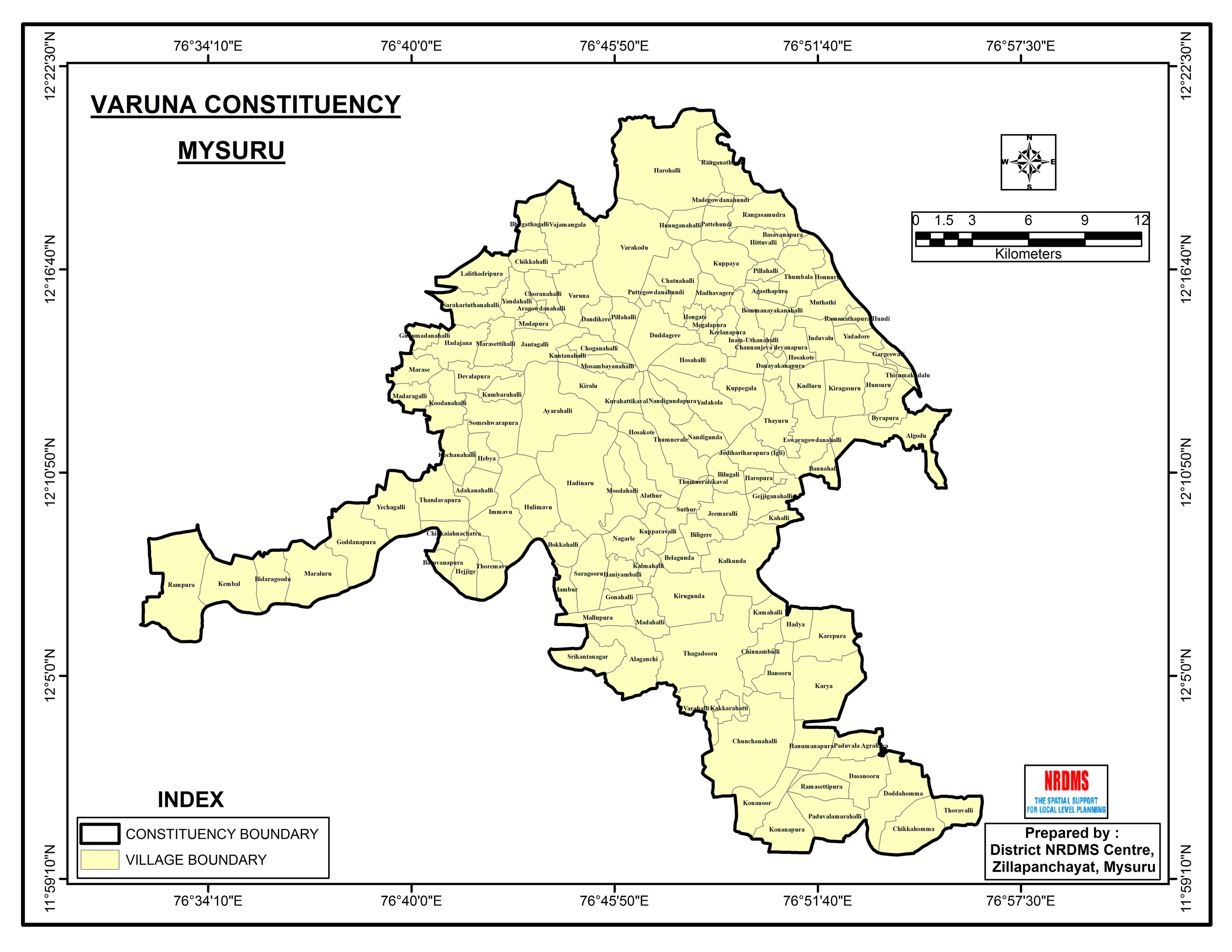
Varuna Vidhana Sabha Constituency

Assembly Constituencies of Mysore district

Varuna Assembly constituency is one of the 224 constituencies in Karnataka State Assembly in India. It is part of Chamarajanagar Lok Sabha constituency. The constituency came into existence after the 2008 delimitation exercise.

== Members of the Legislative Assembly ==
| Year | Member | Political party |
|---|---|---|
| 2008 | Siddaramaiah | Indian National Congress |
| 2013 | Siddaramaiah | Indian National Congress |
| 2018 | Yathindra Siddaramaiah | Indian National Congress |
| 2023 | Siddaramaiah | Indian National Congress |

== Election results ==
=== Assembly Election 2023 ===
2023 Karnataka Legislative Assembly election : Varuna
| Party | Candidate | Votes | % | ±% |
|---|---|---|---|---|
| INC | Siddaramaiah | 119,816 | 60.09 | ▲5.00 |
| BJP | V. Somanna | 73,653 | 36.94 | ▲15.34 |
| JD(S) | Dr BHARATHI SHANKAR N. L. | 1,037 | 0.52 | ▼14.12 |
| NOTA | None of the above | 634 | 0.32 | ▼0.54 |
| Margin of victory | | 46,163 | 23.15 | ▼10.34 |
| Turnout | | 199,801 | 85.19 | ▲5.99 |
| Total valid votes | | 199,379 | | |
| Registered electors | | 234,533 | | ▲6.10 |
| INC hold | | Swing | ▲5.00 | |

=== Assembly Election 2018 ===
2018 Karnataka Legislative Assembly election : Varuna
| Party | Candidate | Votes | % | ±% |
|---|---|---|---|---|
| INC | Yathindra Siddaramaiah | 96,435 | 55.09 | ▼6.12 |
| BJP | T. Basavaraju | 37,819 | 21.60 | New |
| JD(S) | Abhishek S. Manegar | 28,123 | 16.07 | ▲14.12 |
| NOTA | None of the above | 1,497 | 0.86 | New |
| Indian New Congress Party | Gurulingaiah | 1,245 | 0.71 | New |
| KJP | Umesha. C | 1,201 | 0.69 | ▼39.02 |
| Independent | Rajesh. N | 1,118 | 0.64 | New |
| Margin of victory | | 58,616 | 33.49 | ▲11.99 |
| Turnout | | 175,068 | 79.20 | ▼3.23 |
| Total valid votes | | 175,048 | | |
| Registered electors | | 221,053 | | ▲13.41 |
| INC hold | | Swing | ▼6.12 | |

=== Assembly Election 2013 ===
2013 Karnataka Legislative Assembly election : Varuna
| Party | Candidate | Votes | % | ±% |
|---|---|---|---|---|
| INC | Siddaramaiah | 84,385 | 61.21 | ▲10.98 |
| KJP | Kapu Siddalingaswamy | 54,744 | 39.71 | New |
| JD(S) | Cheluvaraj | 2,686 | 1.95 | ▼0.94 |
| BSP | Shivamahadeva | 2,419 | 1.75 | ▼2.04 |
| Samajwadi Janata Party (Karnataka) | G. M. Gadkar | 1,454 | 1.05 | New |
| Independent | Master. M. Suresh | 1,427 | 1.04 | New |
| Independent | Siddalingaswamy | 1,383 | 1.00 | New |
| RPI(A) | D. Eshwara Thoremavu | 1,233 | 0.89 | New |
| Bharatiya Dr. B.R.Ambedkar Janta Party | Nirmalakumari | 1,195 | 0.87 | New |
| Margin of victory | | 29,641 | 21.50 | ▲8.34 |
| Turnout | | 160,680 | 82.43 | ▲6.70 |
| Total valid votes | | 137,852 | | |
| Registered electors | | 194,918 | | ▲3.11 |
| INC hold | | Swing | ▲10.98 | |

=== Assembly Election 2008 ===
2008 Karnataka Legislative Assembly election : Varuna
| Party | Candidate | Votes | % | ±% |
|---|---|---|---|---|
| INC | Siddaramaiah | 71,908 | 50.23 | New |
| BJP | L. Revannasiddaiah | 53,071 | 37.07 | New |
| BSP | P. Gurupadaswamy | 5,426 | 3.79 | New |
| JD(S) | H. V. Krishnaswamy | 4,133 | 2.89 | New |
| Independent | A. N. Rangunayak | 2,485 | 1.74 | New |
| SP | K. Cheluvappa | 1,583 | 1.11 | New |
| Independent | H. R. Nagaraju | 1,162 | 0.81 | New |
| Independent | K. P. Mahalingaiah | 910 | 0.64 | New |
| Margin of victory | | 18,837 | 13.16 | |
| Turnout | | 143,159 | 75.73 | |
| Total valid votes | | 143,150 | | |
| Registered electors | | 189,041 | | |
| INC win (new seat) | | | | |

== See also ==
- Mysore City South Assembly constituency
- Mysore City North Assembly constituency
- Mysore Taluk Assembly constituency
- List of constituencies of Karnataka Legislative Assembly
