= Chamundeshwari Assembly constituency =

Constituency of the Karnataka Legislative Assembly in India

Coordinates: 12.27°N 76.67°E

Chamundeshwari
- Constituency for the Karnataka Legislative Assembly
- Map of Assembly constituency

Constituency details
- Country: India
- Region: South India
- State: Karnataka
- District: Mysore
- Lok Sabha constituency: Mysore
- Established: 1967
- Total electors: 329,223 (2023)
- Reservation: None

Member of Legislative Assembly
- 16th Karnataka Legislative Assembly
- Incumbent G. T. Devegowda
- Party: JD(S)
- Alliance: NDA
- Elected year: 2023
- Preceded by: M. Sathyanarayana

Assembly Constituencies of Mysore district

Chamundeshwari Assembly Constituency is one of the 224 constituencies of Karnataka Legislative Assembly. It is part of Mysore Lok Sabha constituency.

== Members of the Legislative Assembly ==
Election	Member	Party
1967	Kalastavadi Puttaswamy	Indian National Congress
1972	Kalastavadi Puttaswamy	Indian National Congress
1978	D. Jayadevaraja Urs	Indian National Congress
1983	Siddaramaiah	Independent politician
1985	Siddaramaiah	Janata Party
1989	M. Rajasekara Murthy	Indian National Congress
1994	Siddaramaiah	Janata Dal
1999	A. S. Guruswamy	Indian National Congress
2004	Siddaramaiah	Janata Dal
2006 By-election	Siddaramaiah	Indian National Congress
2008	M. Sathyanarayana	Indian National Congress
2013	G. T. Devegowda	Janata Dal
2018	G. T. Devegowda	Janata Dal
2023	G. T. Devegowda	Janata Dal

== Election results ==
=== Assembly Election 2023 ===
2023 Karnataka Legislative Assembly election : Chamundeshwari
Party	Candidate	Votes	%	±%
JD(S)	G. T. Devegowda	104,873	42.44	▼11.18
INC	S. Siddegowda	79,373	32.12	▼5.57
BJP	Kaveesh Gowda. V	51,318	20.77	▲15.44
NOTA	None of the above	2,220	0.90	▲0.22
UPP	S. Harisha	2,219	0.90	New
AAP	Kiran Nagesh Kalyani	1,890	0.76	New
Margin of victory		25,500	10.32	▼5.61
Turnout		247,345	75.13	▼1.35
Total valid votes		247,118		
Registered electors		329,223		▲11.28
JD(S) hold		Swing	▼11.18	

=== Assembly Election 2018 ===
2018 Karnataka Legislative Assembly election : Chamundeshwari
Party	Candidate	Votes	%	±%
JD(S)	G. T. Devegowda	121,325	53.62	
INC	Siddaramaiah	85,283	37.69	
BJP	S. R. Gopalrao	12,064	5.33	▼2.23
Independent	P. Karigowda	1,665	0.74	New
NOTA	None of the above	1,549	0.68	New
Margin of victory		36,042	15.93	▲9.47
Turnout		226,273	76.48	▲2.25
Total valid votes		226,263		
Registered electors		295,843		▲23.54
JD(S) hold		Swing	▼15.39	

=== Assembly Election 2013 ===
2013 Karnataka Legislative Assembly election : Chamundeshwari
Party	Candidate	Votes	%	±%
JD(S)	G. T. Devegowda	75,864	42.87	▲19.15
INC	M. Sathyanarayana	68,761	38.86	▲1.10
KJP	Appanna. M	16,799	15.28	New
BJP	A. Hemanthkumar Gowda	8,308	7.56	▼20.11
Independent	Srinivas	2,433	2.21	New
Independent	Mellahalli Mahadevaswamy	1,806	1.64	New
Margin of victory		7,103	4.01	▼3.07
Turnout		177,761	74.23	▲7.19
Total valid votes		109,938		
Registered electors		239,465		▲6.92
JD(S) gain from INC		Swing	▲31.82	

=== Assembly Election 2008 ===
2008 Karnataka Legislative Assembly election : Chamundeshwari
Party	Candidate	Votes	%	±%
INC	M. Sathyanarayana	55,828	37.19	▼10.05
BJP	Manjegowda. C. N	41,529	27.67	New
JD(S)	C. Basavegowda	35,600	23.72	▼23.42
BSP	D. T. Jayakumar	9,337	6.22	New
Independent	S. Suresh	2,735	1.82	New
SP	B. Karunakar	1,521	1.01	▼0.34
Margin of victory		14,299	9.53	▲9.42
Turnout		150,146	67.04	▲0.74
Total valid votes		150,105		
Registered electors		223,974		▼39.26
INC hold		Swing	▼10.05	

=== Assembly By-election 2006 ===
2006 Karnataka Legislative Assembly by-election : Chamundeshwari
Party	Candidate	Votes	%	±%
INC	Siddaramaiah	115,512	47.24	▲19.29
JD(S)	Shivabasappa	115,255	47.14	▲3.70
Independent	Sarvothama	4,183	1.71	New
SP	B. Karunakar	3,304	1.35	New
Margin of victory		257	0.11	▼15.38
Turnout		244,510	66.30	▲1.46
Total valid votes		244,507		
Registered electors		368,772		▲14.45
INC gain from JD(S)		Swing	▲3.80	

=== Assembly Election 2004 ===
2004 Karnataka Legislative Assembly election : Chamundeshwari
Party	Candidate	Votes	%	±%
JD(S)	Siddaramaiah	90,727	43.44	▲12.78
INC	Revanna Siddaiah. L	58,382	27.95	▼6.45
BJP	Appanna. M	39,648	18.98	▼8.64
BSP	B. Chandra	9,717	4.65	New
JP	Devaraju. K	4,089	1.96	New
Kannada Nadu Party	Krishna S. N.	2,553	1.22	New
Independent	Dasappa. T	1,996	0.96	New
Margin of victory		32,345	15.49	▲11.76
Turnout		208,916	64.84	▼4.33
Total valid votes		208,859		
Registered electors		322,199		▲34.23
JD(S) gain from INC		Swing	▲9.04	

=== Assembly Election 1999 ===
1999 Karnataka Legislative Assembly election : Chamundeshwari
Party	Candidate	Votes	%	±%
INC	A. S. Guruswamy	57,107	34.40	▲2.73
JD(S)	Siddaramaiah	50,907	30.66	New
BJP	Appanna. M	45,855	27.62	▲17.96
Independent	B. Chandra	5,085	3.06	New
Independent	Naganahalli S N Krishna	4,438	2.67	New
Independent	Kalamandira Govindaraju	2,622	1.58	New
Margin of victory		6,200	3.73	▼19.07
Turnout		166,036	69.17	▼2.59
Total valid votes		166,014		
Rejected ballots		9	0.01	▼2.13
Registered electors		240,042		▲19.50
INC gain from JD		Swing	▼20.06	

=== Assembly Election 1994 ===
1994 Karnataka Legislative Assembly election : Chamundeshwari
Party	Candidate	Votes	%	±%
JD	Siddaramaiah	76,823	54.46	▲18.19
INC	A. S. Guruswamy	44,668	31.67	▼10.97
BJP	Appanna. M	13,625	9.66	▲9.17
JP	P. Thammaiah	2,086	1.48	New
KRRS	Joganaika	1,697	1.20	New
INC	S. Latha	1,017	0.72	New
Margin of victory		32,155	22.80	▲16.43
Turnout		144,136	71.76	▼6.59
Total valid votes		141,056		
Rejected ballots		3,080	2.14	▼6.34
Registered electors		200,865		▲43.17
JD gain from INC		Swing	▲11.82	

=== Assembly Election 1989 ===
1989 Karnataka Legislative Assembly election : Chamundeshwari
Party	Candidate	Votes	%	±%
INC	M. Rajasekara Murthy	42,892	42.64	▲9.84
JD	Siddaramaiah	36,483	36.27	New
JP	S. Siddegowda	19,916	19.80	New
Margin of victory		6,409	6.37	▼4.29
Turnout		109,918	78.35	▲0.66
Total valid votes		100,592		
Rejected ballots		9,326	8.48	▲5.70
Registered electors		140,298		▲36.54
INC gain from JP		Swing	▼0.81	

=== Assembly Election 1985 ===
1985 Karnataka Legislative Assembly election : Chamundeshwari
Party	Candidate	Votes	%	±%
JP	Siddaramaiah	33,725	43.45	▲37.27
INC	K. Ranganika	25,454	32.80	▼4.83
Independent	A. S. Guruswamy	15,125	19.49	New
Independent	Shivamallikarjuna Swamy	1,063	1.37	New
Independent	D. S. Lingaraju	812	1.05	New
BJP	M. B. Beerappa	726	0.94	▼1.53
Independent	Chakrajajjaiah	710	0.91	New
Margin of victory		8,271	10.66	▲4.96
Turnout		79,833	77.69	▲8.53
Total valid votes		77,615		
Rejected ballots		2,218	2.78	▼1.40
Registered electors		102,755		▲10.86
JP gain from Independent		Swing	▲0.12	

=== Assembly Election 1983 ===
1983 Karnataka Legislative Assembly election : Chamundeshwari
Party	Candidate	Votes	%	±%
Independent	Siddaramaiah	26,614	43.33	New
INC	D. Jayadevaraja Urs	23,110	37.63	▲15.00
JP	P. Thammaiah	3,797	6.18	▼28.26
Independent	C. N. Mahadevapa	2,945	4.79	New
Independent	G. Shivanna	2,333	3.80	New
BJP	M. B. Beerappa	1,518	2.47	New
Independent	T. Thimmaboye	705	1.15	New
Independent	Gururaj. M	399	0.65	New
Margin of victory		3,504	5.70	▲3.79
Turnout		64,099	69.16	▼4.00
Total valid votes		61,421		
Rejected ballots		2,678	4.18	▼0.11
Registered electors		92,685		▲14.93
Independent gain from INC(I)		Swing	▲6.97	

=== Assembly Election 1978 ===
1978 Karnataka Legislative Assembly election : Chamundeshwari
Party	Candidate	Votes	%	±%
INC(I)	D. Jayadevaraja Urs	20,529	36.36	New
JP	M. Rajasekara Murthy	19,450	34.44	New
INC	K. Kamperegowda	12,776	22.63	▼33.11
Independent	S. Boregowda	1,807	3.20	New
Independent	Rachanika	1,147	2.03	New
Independent	N. P. Rudrappa Rao	352	0.62	New
Margin of victory		1,079	1.91	▼25.01
Turnout		59,000	73.16	▲16.21
Total valid votes		56,467		
Rejected ballots		2,533	4.29	▲4.29
Registered electors		80,642		▲16.91
INC(I) gain from INC		Swing	▼19.38	

=== Assembly Election 1972 ===
1972 Mysore State Legislative Assembly election : Chamundeshwari
Party	Candidate	Votes	%	±%
INC	Kalastavadi Puttaswamy	20,981	55.74	▼2.38
Independent	K. Javare Gowda	10,849	28.82	New
ABJS	M. B. Beerappa	3,620	9.62	▲3.01
SSP	M. N. Thimmaiah	2,188	5.81	New
Margin of victory		10,132	26.92	▲4.07
Turnout		39,279	56.95	▲6.70
Total valid votes		37,638		
Registered electors		68,976		▲19.66
INC hold		Swing	▼2.38	

=== Assembly Election 1967 ===
1967 Mysore State Legislative Assembly election : Chamundeshwari
Party	Candidate	Votes	%	±%
INC	Kalastavadi Puttaswamy	15,721	58.12	New
PSP	M. N. Thimmaiah	9,540	35.27	New
ABJS	Dr. J. M. Raman	1,788	6.61	New
Margin of victory		6,181	22.85	
Turnout		28,967	50.25	
Total valid votes		27,049		
Registered electors		57,644		
INC win (new seat)				

== See also ==
- Mysore City South Assembly constituency
- Mysore City North Assembly constituency
- Mysore Taluk Assembly constituency

List of constituencies of the Karnataka Legislative Assembly
