= T. Narasipur Assembly constituency =

Legislative Assembly constituency in Karnataka State, India

Coordinates: 12.21°N 76.9°E

T. Narasipur
- Constituency No. 220 for the Karnataka Legislative Assembly
- Map of Vidhana Sabha constituency

Constituency details
- Country: India
- Region: South India
- State: Karnataka
- District: Mysore
- Lok Sabha constituency: Chamarajanagar
- Established: 1951
- Total electors: 204,865 (2023)
- Reservation: SC

Member of Legislative Assembly
- 16th Karnataka Legislative Assembly
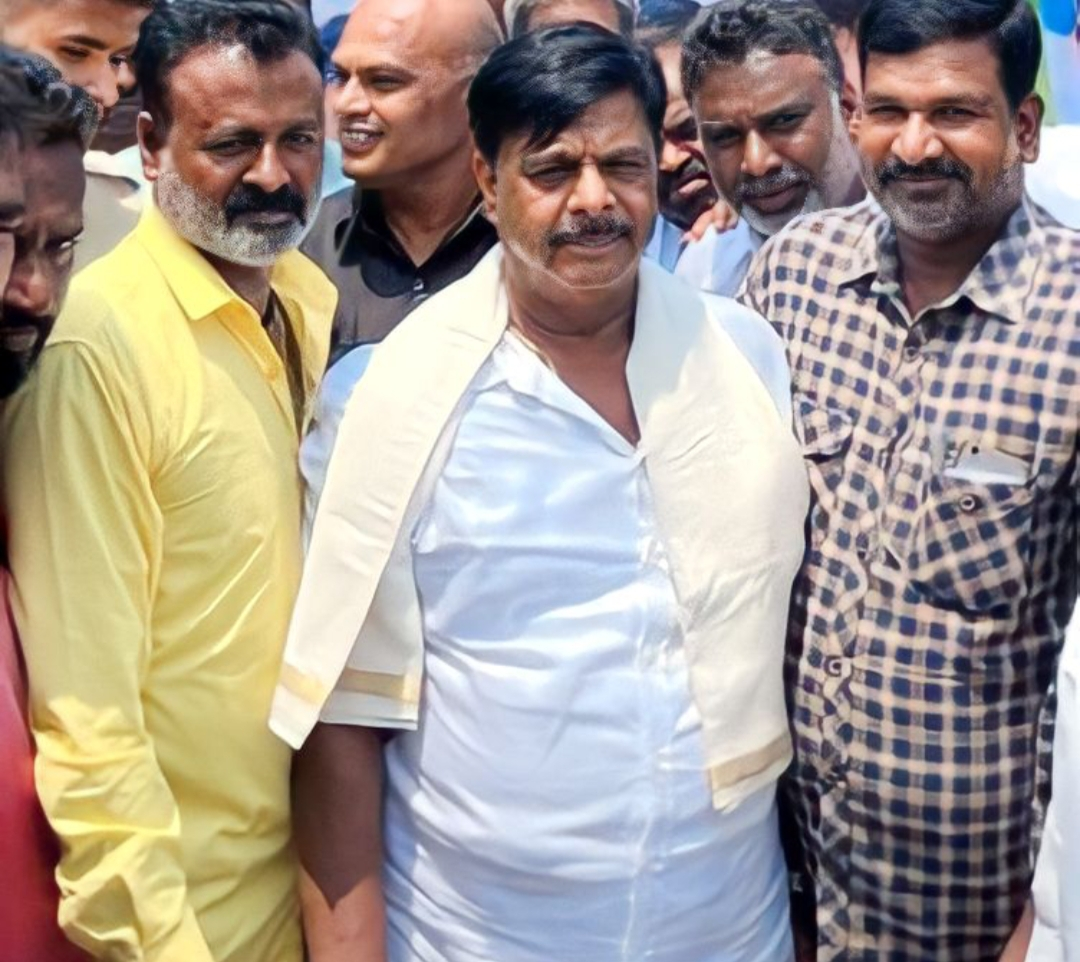
- Incumbent H. C. Mahadevappa
- Party: Indian National Congress
- Elected year: 2023
- Preceded by: M. Ashvin Kumar

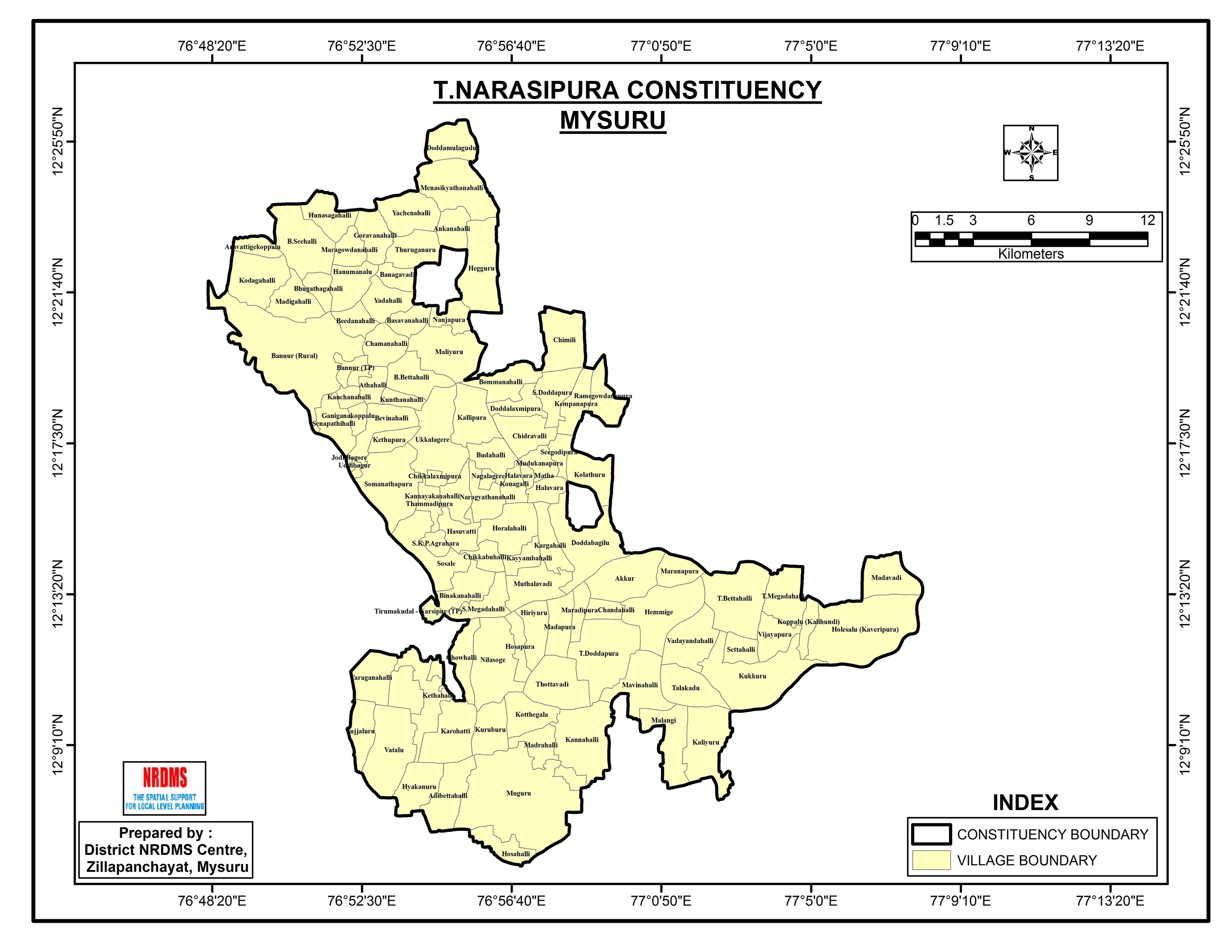
T. Narasipura Vidhana Sabha Constituency

Assembly Constituencies of Mysore district

Tirumakudalu Narasipura Assembly constituency is one of the 224 Legislative Assembly constituencies of Karnataka in India. It is part of Mysore district and is reserved for candidates belonging to the Scheduled Castes. The seat was established in 1957 after 1956 reorganization.

== Members of the Legislative Assembly ==
Election	Member	Party
1952	S. Sreenivasa Iyenger	Kisan Mazdoor Praja Party
1957	M. Rajasekara Murthy	Indian National Congress
1962	M. Rajasekara Murthy	Indian National Congress
1967	M. Rajasekara Murthy	Indian National Congress
1972	M. Rajasekara Murthy	Indian National Congress
1978	Venkataramana. P	Indian National Congress
1983	V. Vasudeva	Janata Party
1985	Dr. H. C. Mahadevappa	Janata Party
1989	M. Sreenivasaiah	Indian National Congress
1994	Dr. H. C. Mahadevappa	Janata Dal
1999	Dr. Bharathi Shankar	Bharatiya Janata Party
2004	Dr. H. C. Mahadevappa	Janata Dal
2008	Dr. H. C. Mahadevappa	Indian National Congress
2013	Dr. H. C. Mahadevappa	Indian National Congress
2018	Ashvin Kumar. M	Janata Dal
2023	Dr. H. C. Mahadevappa	Indian National Congress

== Election results ==
=== Assembly Election 2023 ===
2023 Karnataka Legislative Assembly election : T. Narasipur
Party	Candidate	Votes	%	±%
INC	Dr. H. C. Mahadevappa	77,884	48.00%	▲12.29
JD(S)	Ashvin Kumar. M	59,265	36.53%	▼17.52
BJP	Dr. M. Revanna	20,389	12.57%	▲4.96
NOTA	None of the above	1,335	0.82%	▼0.25
BSP	B. R. Puttaswamy	992	0.61%	New
Margin of victory		18,619	11.48%	▼6.86
Turnout		162,392	79.27%	▲0.98
Total valid votes		162,256		
Registered electors		204,865		▲3.24
INC gain from JD(S)		Swing	▼6.05	

=== Assembly Election 2018 ===
2018 Karnataka Legislative Assembly election : T. Narasipur
Party	Candidate	Votes	%	±%
JD(S)	Ashvin Kumar. M	83,929	54.05%	▲17.94
INC	Dr. H. C. Mahadevappa	55,451	35.71%	▼0.62
BJP	S. Shankar	11,812	7.61%	▲4.08
NOTA	None of the above	1,660	1.07%	New
Margin of victory		28,478	18.34%	▲18.12
Turnout		155,357	78.29%	▲3.06
Total valid votes		155,286		
Registered electors		198,441		▲10.31
JD(S) gain from INC		Swing	▲17.72	

=== Assembly Election 2013 ===
2013 Karnataka Legislative Assembly election : T. Narasipur
Party	Candidate	Votes	%	±%
INC	Dr. H. C. Mahadevappa	53,219	36.33%	▲0.56
JD(S)	M. C. Sundareshan	52,896	36.11%	▲11.87
KJP	Pottabasavaiah	15,204	10.38%	New
BJP	C. Ramesh	5,175	3.53%	▼18.44
Independent	Sampathkumar	1,537	1.05%	New
Bharatiya Dr. B.R.Ambedkar Janta Party	B. M. Doddamadaiah	1,226	0.84%	New
Independent	Talakadu. G. Kemparaju	971	0.66%	New
Margin of victory		323	0.22%	▼11.31
Turnout		135,328	75.23%	▲7.35
Total valid votes		146,477		
Registered electors		179,888		▲2.48
INC hold		Swing	▲0.56	

=== Assembly Election 2008 ===
2008 Karnataka Legislative Assembly election : T. Narasipur
Party	Candidate	Votes	%	±%
INC	Dr. H. C. Mahadevappa	42,593	35.77%	▲12.29
JD(S)	M. C. Sundareshan	28,869	24.24%	▼13.37
BJP	Dr. Subhash Bharani	26,160	21.97%	▲6.24
BSP	S. Gurappaji	10,373	8.71%	▲1.96
Independent	Pottabasavaiah	2,776	2.33%	New
Independent	Somanna	2,287	1.92%	New
Independent	Siddaiah	1,405	1.18%	New
SP	Chitta Bodh	870	0.73%	New
Independent	S. Shivamurthy	797	0.67%	New
Margin of victory		13,724	11.53%	▼2.60
Turnout		119,149	67.88%	▼0.80
Total valid votes		119,080		
Registered electors		175,533		▲19.44
INC gain from JD(S)		Swing	▼1.84	

=== Assembly Election 2004 ===
2004 Karnataka Legislative Assembly election : T. Narasipur
Party	Candidate	Votes	%	±%
JD(S)	Dr. H. C. Mahadevappa	37,956	37.61%	▲12.21
INC	M. Sreenivasaiah	23,699	23.48%	▲3.52
BJP	Gopal. T	15,880	15.73%	▼18.57
JP	Dr. Bharati Shankar. M. L	9,708	9.62%	New
BSP	Pramod Chandra. K. N	6,815	6.75%	▲6.09
Independent	Chitta Bodh	4,173	4.13%	New
Urs Samyuktha Paksha	Raju. A. M	1,411	1.40%	New
Kannada Nadu Party	Somayya Maleyuru	1,282	1.27%	New
Margin of victory		14,257	14.13%	▲5.23
Turnout		100,934	68.68%	▼1.76
Total valid votes		100,924		
Registered electors		146,966		▲10.88
JD(S) gain from BJP		Swing	▲3.31	

=== Assembly Election 1999 ===
1999 Karnataka Legislative Assembly election : T. Narasipur
Party	Candidate	Votes	%	±%
BJP	Dr. Bharathi Shankar	28,858	34.30%	▲27.03
JD(S)	Dr. H. C. Mahadevappa	21,372	25.40%	New
INC	T. N. Narasimha Murthy	16,798	19.96%	▼3.42
JD(U)	H. Vasu	13,302	15.81%	New
Kannada Chalavali Vatal Paksha	Shashikala Nagaraju	2,925	3.48%	New
BSP	K. N. Pramod Chander	552	0.66%	New
Margin of victory		7,486	8.90%	▼26.56
Turnout		93,358	70.44%	▼1.06
Total valid votes		84,138		
Rejected ballots		9,187	9.84%	▲7.37
Registered electors		132,544		▲4.85
BJP gain from JD		Swing	▼24.54	

=== Assembly Election 1994 ===
1994 Karnataka Legislative Assembly election : T. Narasipur
Party	Candidate	Votes	%	±%
JD	Dr. H. C. Mahadevappa	51,874	58.84%	▲21.35
INC	M. Sreenivasaiah	20,615	23.38%	▼27.82
BJP	R. Raghavendra Bharani	6,410	7.27%	New
Independent	K. M. Puttaswamy	5,337	6.05%	New
INC	V. Vasudeva	1,745	1.98%	New
SP	R. Nanjundaiah	1,040	1.18%	New
JP	M. Madappa	735	0.83%	New
Margin of victory		31,259	35.46%	▲21.74
Turnout		90,389	71.50%	▼0.48
Total valid votes		88,158		
Rejected ballots		2,231	2.47%	▼5.14
Registered electors		126,416		▲10.63
JD gain from INC		Swing	▲7.64	

=== Assembly Election 1989 ===
1989 Karnataka Legislative Assembly election : T. Narasipur
Party	Candidate	Votes	%	±%
INC	M. Sreenivasaiah	38,915	51.20%	▲10.95
JD	Dr. H. C. Mahadevappa	28,491	37.49%	New
JP	S. R. Varadaraju	5,148	6.77%	New
Kranti Sabha	A. M. Rajanna	1,101	1.45%	New
Independent	N. Nagaraju	479	0.63%	New
Independent	Mahadevaiah	462	0.61%	New
Margin of victory		10,424	13.72%	▼1.30
Turnout		82,255	71.98%	▲2.68
Total valid votes		75,999		
Rejected ballots		6,256	7.61%	▲5.41
Registered electors		114,270		▲26.06
INC gain from JP		Swing	▼4.07	

=== Assembly Election 1985 ===
1985 Karnataka Legislative Assembly election : T. Narasipur
Party	Candidate	Votes	%	±%
JP	Dr. H. C. Mahadevappa	33,954	55.27%	▲2.18
INC	Pottabasavaiah	24,728	40.25%	▲6.36
Independent	N. C. Biligirirangaiah	1,976	3.22%	New
Independent	Gandhisiddaiah	643	1.05%	New
Margin of victory		9,226	15.02%	▼4.17
Turnout		62,816	69.30%	▲3.39
Total valid votes		61,436		
Rejected ballots		1,380	2.20%	▼1.11
Registered electors		90,646		▲6.42
JP hold		Swing	▲2.18	

=== Assembly Election 1983 ===
1983 Karnataka Legislative Assembly election : T. Narasipur
Party	Candidate	Votes	%	±%
JP	V. Vasudeva	28,817	53.09%	▲15.56
INC	Venkataramana. P	18,398	33.89%	▲31.30
Independent	Shankar. N. R	1,574	2.90%	New
IC(S)	Parthasarathy. B. K	1,426	2.63%	New
Independent	Mahadevaswamy	898	1.65%	New
Independent	Malleshaiah. G. N	886	1.63%	New
Independent	Mahadevu. M	777	1.43%	New
BJP	Shantaraju	690	1.27%	New
Independent	Narasimhaiah. M	595	1.10%	New
Margin of victory		10,419	19.19%	▲4.93
Turnout		56,140	65.91%	▼5.17
Total valid votes		54,282		
Rejected ballots		1,858	3.31%	▼0.29
Registered electors		85,181		▲7.73
JP gain from INC(I)		Swing	▲1.30	

=== Assembly Election 1978 ===
1978 Karnataka Legislative Assembly election : T. Narasipur
Party	Candidate	Votes	%	±%
INC(I)	Venkataramana. P	28,061	51.79%	New
JP	Sreenivasa Prasad. V	20,334	37.53%	New
Independent	Rachiah. N	3,244	5.99%	New
INC	Sannaiah. M	1,403	2.59%	▼42.34
Independent	Gangadhara	592	1.09%	New
Margin of victory		7,727	14.26%	▲5.75
Turnout		56,202	71.08%	▲1.12
Total valid votes		54,181		
Rejected ballots		2,021	3.60%	▲3.60
Registered electors		79,066		▲18.19
INC(I) gain from INC(O)		Swing	▼1.65	

=== Assembly Election 1972 ===
1972 Mysore State Legislative Assembly election : T. Narasipur
Party	Candidate	Votes	%	±%
INC(O)	M. Rajasekara Murthy	24,002	53.44%	New
INC	K. Kempeere Gowda	20,178	44.93%	▼12.60
ABJS	K. Venkateshan	732	1.63%	▼5.07
Margin of victory		3,824	8.51%	▼13.25
Turnout		46,799	69.96%	▲1.08
Total valid votes		44,912		
Registered electors		66,898		▲13.71
INC(O) gain from INC		Swing	▼4.09	

=== Assembly Election 1967 ===
1967 Mysore State Legislative Assembly election : T. Narasipur
Party	Candidate	Votes	%	±%
INC	M. Rajasekara Murthy	21,455	57.53%	▲9.99
Independent	K. K. Gowda	13,339	35.77%	New
ABJS	Y. Ramabai	2,498	6.70%	New
Margin of victory		8,116	21.76%	▲12.02
Turnout		40,524	68.88%	▲1.59
Total valid votes		37,292		
Registered electors		58,831		▲15.12
INC hold		Swing	▲9.99	

=== Assembly Election 1962 ===
1962 Mysore State Legislative Assembly election : T. Narasipur
Party	Candidate	Votes	%	±%
INC	M. Rajasekara Murthy	15,469	47.54%	▼7.52
PSP	J. B. Mallaradhya	12,300	37.80%	▼7.14
ABJS	Y. Ramabai	2,936	9.02%	New
Independent	Somiah	1,835	5.64%	New
Margin of victory		3,169	9.74%	▼0.39
Turnout		34,389	67.29%	▲10.97
Total valid votes		32,540		
Registered electors		51,104		▲12.98
INC hold		Swing	▼7.52	

=== Assembly Election 1957 ===
1957 Mysore State Legislative Assembly election : T. Narasipur
Party	Candidate	Votes	%	±%
INC	M. Rajasekara Murthy	14,028	55.06%	▲22.80
PSP	S. Sreenivasa Iyenger	11,448	44.94%	New
Margin of victory		2,580	10.13%	▲4.70
Turnout		25,476	56.32%	▼9.36
Total valid votes		25,476		
Registered electors		45,234		▲11.34
INC gain from KMPP		Swing	▲17.37	

=== Assembly Election 1952 ===
1952 Mysore State Legislative Assembly election : T. Narasipur
Party	Candidate	Votes	%	±%
KMPP	S. Sreenivasa Iyenger	10,057	37.69%	New
INC	T. P. Boriah	8,607	32.26%	New
Independent	S. Boregowda	4,899	18.36%	New
Independent	S. R. Rangegowda	3,120	11.69%	New
Margin of victory		1,450	5.43%	
Turnout		26,683	65.68%	
Total valid votes		26,683		
Registered electors		40,628		
KMPP win (new seat)				

== See also ==
- List of constituencies of the Karnataka Legislative Assembly
- Mysore district
