= M. Rajasekara Murthy =

Indian politician

MP
- In office 1980–1984
- Preceded by: H.D. Tulsidas
- Succeeded by: Srikanta Datta Narsimharaja Wadiyar
- Constituency: Mysore

MP
- In office 3 April 2006 – 5 December 2010
- Succeeded by: Hema Malini
- Constituency: Karnataka, Rajya Sabha

Finance Minister of Karnataka
- In office 30 November 1989 – 10 October 1990
- Chief Minister: Veerendra Patil

Revenue Minister of Karnataka
- In office 19 November 1992 – 11 December 1994
- Chief Minister: M. Veerappa Moily

Member of Karnataka Legislative Assembly
- In office 1989 - 1994
- Preceded by: Siddaramaiah
- Succeeded by: Siddaramaiah
- Constituency: Chamundeshwari

Personal details
- Born: 10 May 1922 Malangi, Kingdom of Mysore, British India
- Died: 5 December 2010 (aged 88) New Delhi, India
- Other political affiliations: JD(S) (2006),
- Spouse: Shrimati M. Rajamma
- Children: 5 daughters
- Education: B.A., B.Com. and LL.B.
- Alma mater: University of Mysore and Law from Lucknow University

M. Rajasekara Murthy (10 May 1922 – 5 December 2010) was an Indian politician, who was a member 7th Lok Sabha the lower house of the Indian Parliament from the Lok Sabha constituency of Mysore in Karnataka. He also participated in the Freedom Struggle.

== Early life and background ==
Rajasekara Murthy was born on May 10, 1922, at Malangi Village in T. Narasipur Taluk of Mysore District. Shri Madappa was his father.

== Personal life ==
M. Rajasekara Murthy married Shrimati M. Rajamma (since deceased) and couple had 5 daughters.

== Position held ==
#	From	To	Position	Party
	1952	1957	MLA (1st term) from Yelandur (Kolar District of Mysore State)	Independent
	1957	1962	MLA (2nd term) from T Narsipur of Mysore State	Indian National Congress
	1962	1967	MLA (3rd term) from T Narsipur of Mysore State	Indian National Congress
	1967	1972	MLA (4th term) from T Narsipur of Mysore State: Minister for Industry, Information and Publicity and Film Development, Karnataka (1968–1971).	Indian National Congress
	1972	1978	MLA (5th term) from T Narsipur of Mysore State	Indian National Congress
	1980	1984	Member of Parliament in 7th Lok Sabha from Mysore	Indian National Congress (I)
	1989	1994	MLA (6th term) from Chamundeshwari from Karnataka: Minister of Finance and Excise, Govt of Karnataka (1989 - 1990); Minister of Revenue and Religious Endowments, Govt of Karnataka (1992 - 1993)	Indian National Congress
	1994	1999	MP in Rajya Sabha from Karnataka (resigned w.e.f. on 23rd Aug 1999).: Union Minister of Surface Transport (Independent Charge) (Sept 1995 - June 1996).; Member of Committee on Energy (1994 - 1996).; Member of Committee on Commerce (1995 - 1996).; Member of the Advisory Council of Customs and Central Excise (1996 - 1998).; Member of the Committee on Finance Member, Consultative Committee for the Ministry of Industry (1998 - 1999).	Indian National Congress
	2000	2005	MP in Rajya Sabha from Karnataka (resigned w.e.f. on 10 Nov 2005): Member of the Committee on Finance Member, Consultative Committee for the Ministry of Industry (Jan 2003 - Feb 2004).; Member of Central Silk Board (April 2000 - May 2003); Member, Committee on Agriculture (2001); Member of Consultative Committee for the Ministry of Science and Technology and Department of Ocean Development (2001 - Feb 2004); Member of Tobacco Board and Member of Consultative Committee for South Zone Railway (May 2002 - Nov 2005); Member of Bureau of Indian Standards (May 2002 - Sept 2004); Member of Committee on Petitions (Jan 2003 - July 2004); Member of Committee on Petroleum and Natural Gas (Aug 2004 - Nov 2005)	Bharatiya Janata Party
	2006	2010	MP in Rajya Sabha from Karnataka (died on 5 December 2010): Member of Committee on Petroleum and Natural Gas (June 2006 - July 2006); Member of Committee on Agriculture; Member of the Consultative Committee for the Ministry of Commerce and Industry; Member of the Zonal Railways Consultative Committee for Western Railways	Janata Dal (Secular)

=== Also served as ===
- Director in many public limited and private limited companies.
- President of Co-operative Bank.
- Honorary Secretary of various educational institutions, and hostels.
- Secretary of Karnataka Congress Legislature Party.
- Treasurer of Karnataka Congress (O) Legislature Party.
- Member of various committees of Karnataka Legislature.

== Political career ==
Murthy had held several senior cabinet minister positions in Karnataka Government including the important portfolios of Excise, Industry, Finance and Revenue. He was also a union minister under the then former prime minister Sri PV Narasimha Rao's cabinet.

A close follower of former Congress President S. Nijalingappa and a close associate of former Chief Minister Veerendra Patil, Murthy had served in their Ministries and also with M. Veerappa Moily, before he moved to Rajya Sabha.

He was regarded as one of the most powerful Lingayat leaders, a powerful community dominating the political scenario of the State.

He was a member of Lok Sabha once and represented Rajya Sabha thrice with Congress, BJP and JD(S) party tickets during the last three terms. He was a Minister of State (independent charge) holding the Ministries of Surface Transport and Ports in the P.V. Narasimha Rao Ministry.

Known for his discipline and administrative acumen, Murthy revived the financial position of Karnataka when he took over as Finance Minister when Veerendra Patil became the Chief Minister for the second time in 1989. It was during Veerappa Moily's regime as CM that Murthy as Revenue Minister unearthed landscam in Mysore taluk, which led to suspension and sacking of government officials for colluding with land grabbers, creating fictitious documents.

He was the cousin brother of former Union Minister M.S. Gurupadaswamy.

Entering the first Assembly in 1952 from T. Narasipura constituency, he was elected to Assembly again five times.

A close aide of the then Chief Minister S. Nijalingappa, Murthy became the Minister for Commerce and Industry.

Opposition Leader Siddharamaiah was once a contender for Chamundeswari seat represented by Murthy. It was in 1989 that Murthy of Congress defeated Siddharamaiah of JD(S) by 6892 votes. Murthy got 42,892 votes, while Siddu 36,000 votes.

Murthy has been the Member of Parliament-Rajya Sabha many times. He won one of the Rajya Sabha seats by defeating the business tycoon Vijaya Mallya. Mallya was very confident about his win due to his wealth but did not consider the factor that people and their representatives trusted Mr. Murthy and his principles and taught Dr. Vijaya Mallya that his money, power and lobby were as good as his Kingfisher Airlines against the loyalty and trust Mr. Murthy commanded.

He was a known party hopper. Initially he was with Congress, but later joined BJP followed by JD(S). He was known for being relatively self-controlled and abrasive. This irritated the high command of their respective parties, who gave into corruption and bribery. Hence he was frequently troubled and had to shift parties. He had to become the CM of Karnataka back in the early 1990s but was denied the change due to the immoral administration of his superiors and peers. Mr. Murthy was a follower of Mahatma Gandhi and his values, unlike his superiors.

== Electoral History ==
=== Rajya Sabha ===
Position	Party	Constituency	From	To	Tenure
Member of Parliament, Rajya Sabha (1st Term)	INC(I)	Karnataka	3 April 1994	23 Aug 1999	5 years, 142 days
Member of Parliament, Rajya Sabha (2nd Term)	BJP	Karnataka	3 April 2000	10 Nov 2005	5 years, 221 days
Member of Parliament, Rajya Sabha (3rd Term)	JD(S)	Karnataka	3 April 2006	5 Dec 2010	4 years, 246 days

== Death ==
Murthy died on 5 December 2010 in Delhi. His body was taken to Bangalore and the state funeral was held at Chamrajanagar on 7 December 2010.
