= B. B. Chimmanakatti =

Indian politician

B B Chimmanakatti

Member of the Karnataka Legislative Assembly
- In office 2013–2018
- Preceded by: M K Pattanashetti
- Succeeded by: Siddaramaiah
- Constituency: Badami
- In office 1994–2004
- Preceded by: M K Pattanashetti
- Succeeded by: M K Pattanashetti
- Constituency: Badami
- In office 1978–1985
- Constituency: Badami

Personal details
- Born: Badami, Bagalkot, India
- Party: Indian National Congress
- Children: 1 son (Bhimsen Chimmanakatti) and 3 daughters
- Occupation: Politician, Agriculturist

Balappa Bhimappa Chimmanakatti is a politician from the state of Karnataka. He is a leader of Indian National Congress. He won as MLA in 2013 from Badami assembly constituency. In 2018 assembly elections, then Chief Minister Siddaramaiah contested elections from Badami and hence Chimmanakatti did not contest.

== Career ==
He has been the MLA of Badami in 1978, 1983, 1994, 1999 and 2013. He is the founder of Shri Kalidasa educational society in Badami, Bagalkot district. He secured victory over Shanthagouda Thirthgouda Patil from the BJP with a margin of 9725 votes.

BB Chimmanakatti was disappointed when the Congress decided to field Siddaramaiah from Badami which raised concerns about a potential defeat in Chamundeshwari. Chimmanakatti openly expressed his dissatisfaction over not receiving a ticket as it was given to another Kuruba leader Siddaramaiah. Nonetheless, he was eventually reassured and Siddaramaiah managed to secure a narrow victory with a margin of 1,696 votes against the BJP candidate, B Sriramulu. in 2013, Chimmanakatti had won the election with a more substantial margin of over 15,000 votes. His son won Badami seat which he represented 5 times.
