= Badami Assembly constituency =

Constituency of the Karnataka Legislative Assembly in India

Coordinates: 15.92°N 75.68°E

Badami
- Constituency No. 23 for the Karnataka Legislative Assembly

Constituency details
- Country: India
- Region: South India
- State: Karnataka
- District: Bagalkote
- Lok Sabha constituency: Bagalkot
- Established: 1951
- Total electors: 220,435
- Reservation: None

Member of Legislative Assembly
- 16th Karnataka Legislative Assembly
- Incumbent Bhimsen Chimmanakatti
- Party: INC
- Elected year: 2023
- Preceded by: Siddaramaiah

Badami Assembly constituency is one of 224 assembly constituencies in Karnataka State, in India. It is part of Bagalkot Lok Sabha constituency.

== Members of the Legislative Assembly ==
Election	Member	Party
1952	Venkanagouda Hanumantagouda Patil	Indian National Congress
1957	Venkanagouda Hanumantagouda Patil	Indian National Congress
1962	Venkanagouda Hanumantagouda Patil	Indian National Congress
1967	P. K. Mahagundappa	Independent politician
1972	Raosaheb Desai	Indian National Congress
1978	B. B. Chimmanakatti	Indian National Congress
1983	B. B. Chimmanakatti	Indian National Congress
1985	Desai Ravasaheb Tulasigerappa	Janata Party
1989	Mahagundappa Kallappa Pattanshetty	Janata Dal
1994	B. B. Chimmanakatti	Indian National Congress
1999	B. B. Chimmanakatti	Indian National Congress
2004	Mahagundappa Kallappa Pattanshetty	Bharatiya Janata Party
2008	Mahagundappa Kallappa Pattanshetty	Bharatiya Janata Party
2013	B. B. Chimmanakatti	Indian National Congress
2018	Siddaramaiah	Indian National Congress
2023	Bhimsen Chimmanakatti	Indian National Congress

== Election results ==
=== Assembly Election 2023 ===
2023 Karnataka Legislative Assembly election : Badami
Party	Candidate	Votes	%	±%
INC	Bhimsen Chimmanakatti	65,845	38.95%	▼2.29
BJP	Shanthagouda Thirthgouda Patil	56,120	33.20%	▼7.00
JD(S)	Hanamant B. Mavinamarad	41,572	24.59%	▲9.65
AAP	Jogin Shivarayappa Doddakariyappa	1,650	0.98%	New
NOTA	None of the above	1,479	0.87%	▼0.35
Margin of victory		9,725	5.75%	▲4.72
Turnout		170,108	77.17%	▲1.84
Total valid votes		169,038		
Registered electors		220,435		▲1.25
INC hold		Swing	▼2.29	

=== Assembly Election 2018 ===
2018 Karnataka Legislative Assembly election : Badami
Party	Candidate	Votes	%	±%
INC	Siddaramaiah	67,599	41.24%	▼0.07
BJP	B Sreeramulu	65,903	40.20%	▲18.41
JD(S)	Hanamant B. Mavinamarad	24,484	14.94%	▼15.50
Independent	Somashekhar Basappa Baragundi	1,235	0.75%	New
NOTA	None of the above	2,007	1.22%	New
Margin of victory		1,696	1.03%	▼9.84
Turnout		164,006	75.33%	▲4.62
Total valid votes		163,925		
Registered electors		217,721		▲10.70
INC hold		Swing	▼0.07	

=== Assembly Election 2013 ===
2013 Karnataka Legislative Assembly election : Badami
Party	Candidate	Votes	%	±%
INC	B. B. Chimmanakatti	57,446	41.31%	▲0.75
JD(S)	Mahantesh Gurupadappa Mamadapur	42,333	30.44%	▲24.08
BJP	Mahagundappa Kallappa Pattanshetty	30,310	21.79%	▼23.06
KJP	Basayya Prabayya Hallur	3,095	2.23%	New
BSRCP	M S Patil	1,807	1.30%	New
BSP	Kantichandra Jyothi	1,616	1.16%	▼2.22
Independent	Dayanand Sridharrao Kulkarni	1,456	1.05%	New
JD(U)	Maruti Jamindar	1,008	0.72%	New
Margin of victory		15,113	10.87%	▲6.58
Turnout		139,076	70.71%	▲4.89
Total valid votes		139,071		
Registered electors		196,673		▲8.62
INC gain from BJP		Swing	▼3.54	

=== Assembly Election 2008 ===
2008 Karnataka Legislative Assembly election : Badami
Party	Candidate	Votes	%	±%
BJP	Mahagundappa Kallappa Pattanshetty	53,409	44.85%	▼9.01
INC	B. B. Chimmanakatti	48,302	40.56%	▲6.13
JD(S)	Ningappa Basappa Bannur	7,569	6.36%	▲0.64
BSP	Ashok Krishnaji Kattimani	4,030	3.38%	▲1.04
Independent	Virupakshagouda Shankaragouda Patil	2,678	2.25%	New
SP	Kumar Basavlingayya Hampiholi	1,242	1.04%	New
Independent	Manohar H Ayyannavar	1,040	0.87%	New
Independent	Dr. Banni Sangappa Veerappa	825	0.69%	New
Margin of victory		5,107	4.29%	▼15.14
Turnout		119,182	65.82%	▲0.30
Total valid votes		119,095		
Registered electors		181,069		▲21.23
BJP hold		Swing	▼9.01	

=== Assembly Election 2004 ===
2004 Karnataka Legislative Assembly election : Badami
Party	Candidate	Votes	%	±%
BJP	Mahagundappa Kallappa Pattanshetty	52,678	53.86%	New
INC	B. B. Chimmanakatti	33,677	34.43%	▼14.81
JD(S)	Muchakandayya Basayya Hangargi	5,590	5.72%	▲5.01
BSP	Maraditota Laxmana Rangappa	2,284	2.34%	▲1.07
Independent	Patil Veerupakshagouda Shankaragouda	1,592	1.63%	New
JP	Dodamani Rajesab Modinsab	1,123	1.15%	New
Kannada Nadu Party	Manohar Hanamantappa Elegar	858	0.88%	New
Margin of victory		19,001	19.43%	▲18.98
Turnout		97,862	65.52%	▼4.30
Total valid votes		97,802		
Registered electors		149,357		▲16.03
BJP gain from INC		Swing	▲4.62	

=== Assembly Election 1999 ===
1999 Karnataka Legislative Assembly election : Badami
Party	Candidate	Votes	%	±%
INC	B. B. Chimmanakatti	42,962	49.24%	▲15.08
JD(U)	Pattanashetty Mahagundappa Kallappa	42,565	48.78%	New
BSP	Laxman Maraditot	1,110	1.27%	New
JD(S)	Sunkad Shivana Gouda Shankara Gouda	620	0.71%	New
Margin of victory		397	0.45%	▼1.30
Turnout		89,882	69.82%	▲0.32
Total valid votes		87,257		
Registered electors		128,726		▲8.56
INC hold		Swing	▲15.08	

=== Assembly Election 1994 ===
1994 Karnataka Legislative Assembly election : Badami
Party	Candidate	Votes	%	±%
INC	B. B. Chimmanakatti	27,354	34.16%	▼1.20
JD	Mahagundappa Kallappa Pattanshetty	25,956	32.42%	▼18.51
Independent	Gaddigoudar Parwatagouda Chandanagoud	15,053	18.80%	New
Karnataka Rajya Ryota Sangha	Jogin Bhimappa Sakrappa	4,465	5.58%	New
BJP	Hallur Basayya Prabhayya	3,098	3.87%	▲2.20
INC	Arishinagodi Sonamma Bhimappa	1,373	1.71%	New
Independent	Udagatti Shasikant Hanamantappa	831	1.04%	New
Margin of victory		1,398	1.75%	▼13.83
Turnout		82,413	69.50%	▲2.03
Total valid votes		80,070		
Registered electors		118,581		▲5.06
INC gain from JD		Swing	▼16.77	

=== Assembly Election 1989 ===
1989 Karnataka Legislative Assembly election : Badami
Party	Candidate	Votes	%	±%
JD	Mahagundappa Kallappa Pattanshetty	36,596	50.93%	New
INC	Shiddayya Shivayya Kadayyanavar	25,405	35.36%	▼0.45
Kranti Sabha	Bhimappa Sakrappajogin	5,711	7.95%	New
JP	Basayya. M. M	1,490	2.07%	New
BJP	Praksh Shivayogeppa Chitta Ragi	1,198	1.67%	▲0.77
Independent	Prabhakar Hanamantarao Desai	701	0.98%	New
Margin of victory		11,191	15.58%	▼7.72
Turnout		76,153	67.47%	▼3.66
Total valid votes		71,850		
Registered electors		112,866		▲26.45
JD gain from JP		Swing	▼8.18	

=== Assembly Election 1985 ===
1985 Karnataka Legislative Assembly election : Badami
Party	Candidate	Votes	%	±%
JP	Desai Ravasaheb Tulasigerappa	36,701	59.11%	▲57.30
INC	B. B. Chimmanakatti	22,235	35.81%	▼15.07
Independent	Khaji Ismailsab Hasimsab	1,226	1.97%	New
BJP	Gudi Narasinhacharya Huchhacharya	560	0.90%	New
Independent	Naganur Chinagibadashah Kamalsab	508	0.82%	New
Independent	Jigeri Basappa Dyamanna	380	0.61%	New
Margin of victory		14,466	23.30%	▲17.76
Turnout		63,487	71.13%	▲4.48
Total valid votes		62,089		
Registered electors		89,254		▲6.81
JP gain from INC		Swing	▲8.23	

=== Assembly Election 1983 ===
1983 Karnataka Legislative Assembly election : Badami
Party	Candidate	Votes	%	±%
INC	B. B. Chimmanakatti	27,336	50.88%	▲32.03
Independent	Desai Ravasaheb Tulasigerappa	24,360	45.34%	New
JP	Payannavar Yamanappa Basappa	973	1.81%	▼34.64
Independent	Patil Gangagouda Shankaragouda	674	1.25%	New
Margin of victory		2,976	5.54%	▼2.71
Turnout		55,693	66.65%	▼6.94
Total valid votes		53,726		
Rejected ballots		1,967	3.53%	▲1.59
Registered electors		83,566		▲9.55
INC gain from INC(I)		Swing	▲6.18	

=== Assembly Election 1978 ===
1978 Karnataka Legislative Assembly election : Badami
Party	Candidate	Votes	%	±%
INC(I)	B. B. Chimmanakatti	24,249	44.70%	New
JP	Pattanashetti Kallappa Mahagundappa	19,772	36.45%	New
INC	Lagali Hoovappa Yallappa	10,226	18.85%	▼43.69
Margin of victory		4,477	8.25%	▼18.47
Turnout		56,138	73.59%	▲0.80
Total valid votes		54,247		
Rejected ballots		1,091	1.94%	▲1.94
Registered electors		76,280		▲12.58
INC(I) gain from INC		Swing	▼17.84	

=== Assembly Election 1972 ===
1972 Mysore State Legislative Assembly election : Badami
Party	Candidate	Votes	%	±%
INC	Raosaheb Desai	29,832	62.54%	▲25.98
INC(O)	P. K. Mahagundappa	17,086	35.82%	New
ABJS	K. Digambar Hanamant	783	1.64%	New
Margin of victory		12,746	26.72%	▼0.16
Turnout		49,315	72.79%	▼0.79
Total valid votes		47,701		
Registered electors		67,754		▲14.72
INC gain from Independent		Swing	▼0.90	

=== Assembly Election 1967 ===
1967 Mysore State Legislative Assembly election : Badami
Party	Candidate	Votes	%	±%
Independent	P. K. Mahagundappa	25,849	63.44%	New
INC	P. V. Hanamantagouda	14,897	36.56%	▼22.37
Margin of victory		10,952	26.88%	▲6.80
Turnout		43,455	73.58%	▲11.28
Total valid votes		40,746		
Registered electors		59,060		▲13.84
Independent gain from INC		Swing	▲4.51	

=== Assembly Election 1962 ===
1962 Mysore State Legislative Assembly election : Badami
Party	Candidate	Votes	%	±%
INC	Venkanagouda Hanumantagouda Patil	17,573	58.93%	▼1.80
SWA	Shankarappa Shankarappa Pattanshetti	11,585	38.85%	New
ABJS	Mrutyunjaya Neelkanthayya Hiremath	663	2.22%	New
Margin of victory		5,988	20.08%	▼1.38
Turnout		32,321	62.30%	▼0.42
Total valid votes		29,821		
Registered electors		51,878		▲7.04
INC hold		Swing	▼1.80	

=== Assembly Election 1957 ===
1957 Mysore State Legislative Assembly election : Badami
Party	Candidate	Votes	%	±%
INC	Venkanagouda Hanumantagouda Patil	18,460	60.73%	▼4.39
Independent	Desai Shankarappagouda Basalingappagouda	11,938	39.27%	New
Margin of victory		6,522	21.46%	▼8.78
Turnout		30,398	62.72%	▼1.42
Total valid votes		30,398		
Registered electors		48,468		▲5.52
INC hold		Swing	▼4.39	

=== Assembly Election 1952 ===
1952 Mysore State Legislative Assembly election : Badami
Party	Candidate	Votes	%	±%
INC	Venkanagouda Hanumantagouda Patil	19,186	65.12%	New
KMPP	Desai Shankarappagouda Basalingappagouda	10,276	34.88%	New
Margin of victory		8,910	30.24%	
Turnout		29,462	64.14%	
Total valid votes		29,462		
Registered electors		45,934		
INC win (new seat)				

== See also ==
List of constituencies of the Karnataka Legislative Assembly
