= G. T. Devegowda =

Indian politician

Gungralchatra Tammegowda Devegowda

Member of the Karnataka Legislative Assembly
- Incumbent
- Assumed office 2013
- Preceded by: M. Sathyanarayana
- Constituency: Chamundeshwari

Minister of Higher Education of Karnataka
- In office 23 May 2018 – 23 July 2019
- Chief Minister: H. D. Kumaraswamy
- Preceded by: Basavaraj Rayareddy
- Succeeded by: C. N. Ashwath Narayan

Personal details
- Born: Gungaralu Tammegowda Devegowda; 25 November 1949 (age 76) Gungralchatra
- Party: Janata Dal (Secular)
- Spouse: K. Lalitha
- Relations: Tammegowda (father)
- Children: 3 including GD Harish Gowda
- Profession: Politician

Gungralchatra Tammegowda Devegowda (born 1949) is an Indian politician from Karnataka. He was the Minister of Higher Education of Karnataka in the JDS and Indian National Congress Coalition government in the Second H. D. Kumaraswamy ministry from 23 May 2018 to 23 July 2019.

== Career ==
Devegowda started his political career with Congress in the 1970s, and later joined Janata Dal (Secular). In the 2018 Karnataka Legislative Assembly election, he won by a large margin against the incumbent chief minister Siddaramaiah, from Chamundeshwari Assembly segment.
