= Yathindra Siddaramaiah =

Indian politician

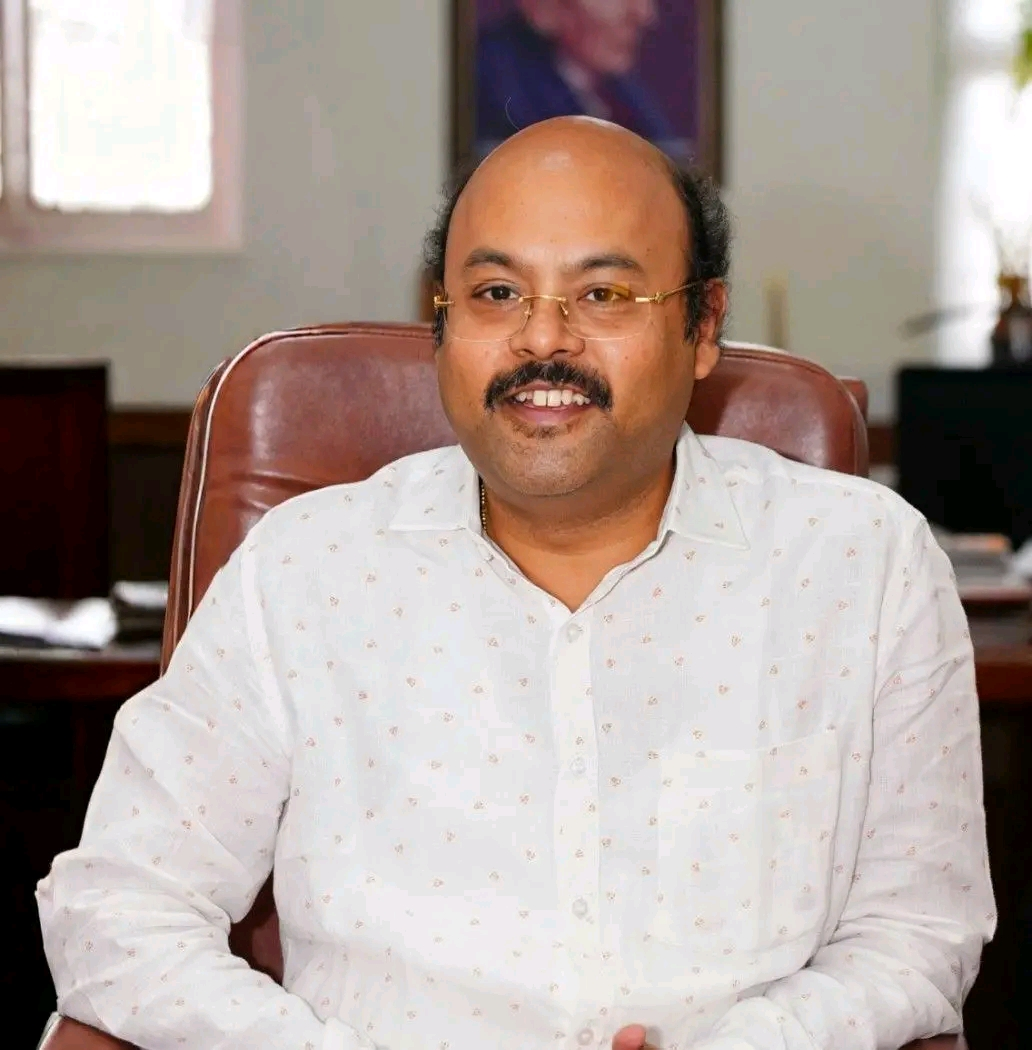

Cabinet Minister Government of Karnataka
- Incumbent
- Assumed office 04 June 2026
- Governor: Thawar Chand Gehlot
- Chief minister: D. K. Shivakumar
- Portfolios: Urban Development Department, Karnataka Urban Water Supply and Drainage Board, Urban Development Authorities (Excluding Bengaluru), Local Planning Authorities (Excluding Bengaluru related authorities)
- Preceded by: Byrathi Suresh

Leader of the House Karnataka Legislative Council
- Incumbent
- Assumed office 13 August 2026
- Chairperson Deputy Chairperson: Saleem Ahmed; Umashree
- Preceded by: N. S. Boseraju

Member of the Karnataka Legislative Council
- Incumbent
- Assumed office 18 June 2024
- Preceded by: K. Harishkumar
- Constituency: Elected by MLAs

Member of the Karnataka Legislative Assembly
- In office 12 May 2018 – 13 May 2023
- Preceded by: Siddaramaiah
- Succeeded by: Siddaramaiah
- Constituency: Varuna

Personal details
- Born: 27 June 1980 (age 46) Bangalore, Karnataka, India
- Party: Indian National Congress
- Parent(s): Siddaramaiah, Smt Parvathi S
- Education: MBBS at Bangalore Medical College, MD at KLE University, Belagavi
- Occupation: Politician, Pathologist

Yathindra Siddaramaiah is a politician from the state of Karnataka. He is a member of the Indian National Congress, and served as a MLA from Varuna. He is the younger son of former Chief Minister Siddaramaiah.

== Personal Life ==
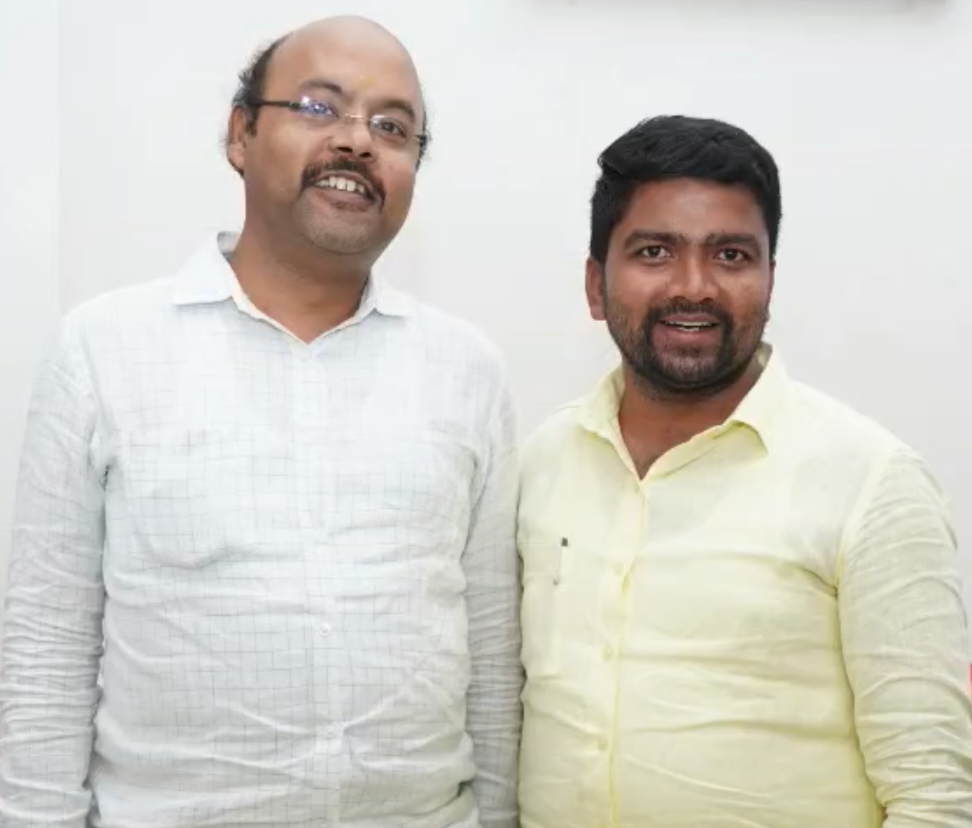

He is a doctor by profession, having trained as a pathologist.

== Political career ==
He contested the safe seat of Varuna in the 2018 Karnataka Legislative Assembly election, winning comfortably.
