= Manvi Assembly constituency =

Legislative Assembly constituency in Karnataka State, India

Coordinates: 16°N 77.05°E

Manvi
- Constituency No. 55 for the Karnataka Legislative Assembly

Constituency details
- Country: India
- Region: South India
- State: Karnataka
- District: Raichur
- Lok Sabha constituency: Raichur
- Established: 1951
- Total electors: 233,867
- Reservation: ST

Member of Legislative Assembly
- 16th Karnataka Legislative Assembly
- Incumbent G. Hampayya Nayak
- Party: Indian National Congress
- Elected year: 2023
- Preceded by: Raja Venkatappa Nayak

Manvi Assembly constituency is one of the 224 Legislative Assembly constituencies of Karnataka in India.

It is part of Raichur district and is reserved for candidates belonging to the Scheduled Tribes.

== Members of the Legislative Assembly ==
Election	Member	Party
1952	Pampana Gowda	Independent politician
1957	Baswarajeshwari	Indian National Congress
1962	Baswarajeshwari	Indian National Congress
1967	B. Sharanabasawaraj	Indian National Congress
1972	Bhimanna Narsappa	Indian National Congress
1978	R. Ambanna Naik Dorai Hanamappa Naik	Indian National Congress
1983	Raja Amarappa Naik Raja Jadi Somalinga Naik	Indian National Congress
1985	Thimmangouda Anwari	Janata Party
1989	Basangouda Amaregouda	Independent politician
1994	Gangadhar Nayak	Janata Dal
1999	N. S. Boseraju	Indian National Congress
2004	N. S. Boseraju	Indian National Congress
2008	G. Hampayya Nayak	Indian National Congress
2013	G. Hampayya Sahukar Ballatagi	Indian National Congress
2018	Raja Venkatappa Nayak	Janata Dal
2023	G. Hampayya Nayak	Indian National Congress

== Election results ==
=== Assembly Election 2023 ===
2023 Karnataka Legislative Assembly election : Manvi
Party	Candidate	Votes	%	±%
INC	G. Hampayya Nayak	66,922	42.43%	▲24.14
BJP	A. Bhagavantaray	59,203	37.53%	▲17.89
JD(S)	Raja Venkatappa Nayak	25,990	16.48%	▼18.28
AAP	Raja Shamsunder Nayak	2,932	1.86%	New
NOTA	None of the above	1,255	0.80%	▼0.41
Margin of victory		7,719	4.89%	▼5.38
Turnout		157,824	67.48%	▲4.47
Total valid votes		157,730		
Registered electors		233,867		▼4.42
INC gain from JD(S)		Swing	▲7.67	

=== Assembly Election 2018 ===
2018 Karnataka Legislative Assembly election : Manvi
Party	Candidate	Votes	%	±%
JD(S)	Raja Venkatappa Nayak	53,548	34.76%	▲0.52
Independent	Dr. Tanusree @ Preeti	37,733	24.49%	New
BJP	Sharanappa K. Gudadinni	30,250	19.64%	▲17.34
INC	G. Hampayya Nayak	28,177	18.29%	▼21.44
NOTA	None of the above	1,870	1.21%	New
AIMEP	Krishna Nayak	1,240	0.80%	New
Independent	R. Mudukappa Nayak	1,235	0.80%	New
Margin of victory		15,815	10.27%	▲4.79
Turnout		154,168	63.01%	▲1.88
Total valid votes		154,053		
Registered electors		244,675		▲22.59
JD(S) gain from INC		Swing	▼4.97	

=== Assembly Election 2013 ===
2013 Karnataka Legislative Assembly election : Manvi
Party	Candidate	Votes	%	±%
INC	G. Hampayya Sahukar Ballatagi	50,619	39.73%	▲3.87
JD(S)	Raja Venkatappa Nayak	43,632	34.24%	▲10.39
KJP	Gangadhar Nayak	14,465	11.35%	New
BSRCP	Basanagouda Daddal	4,363	3.42%	New
BJP	Ayyamma Nayak	2,935	2.30%	▼31.20
Independent	Marinagappa Haravi	1,940	1.52%	New
CPI(ML) Red Star	Com. V. Mudukappa Nayak Nirmanvi	1,294	1.02%	New
BSP	Mallappa Bangari	991	0.78%	▼0.68
JD(U)	Susheelamma R. Mudukappa Nayak	958	0.75%	New
Margin of victory		6,987	5.48%	▲3.12
Turnout		122,011	61.13%	▲6.45
Total valid votes		127,422		
Registered electors		199,588		▲2.21
INC hold		Swing	▲3.87	

=== Assembly Election 2008 ===
2008 Karnataka Legislative Assembly election : Manvi
Party	Candidate	Votes	%	±%
INC	G. Hampayya Nayak	38,290	35.86%	▼2.89
BJP	Gangadhar Nayak	35,771	33.50%	▲25.05
JD(S)	Raja Venkatappa Nayak	25,468	23.85%	▲3.16
Independent	V. Mudukappa Nayak Neermanvi	2,587	2.42%	New
SP	Adeppa Diwan	1,659	1.55%	New
BSP	Earamma Alias Sunitha	1,563	1.46%	New
Independent	Bangari Mallappa Nayak	1,433	1.34%	New
Margin of victory		2,519	2.36%	▼7.78
Turnout		106,772	54.68%	▼7.49
Total valid votes		106,771		
Registered electors		195,274		▲21.74
INC hold		Swing	▼2.89	

=== Assembly Election 2004 ===
2004 Karnataka Legislative Assembly election : Manvi
Party	Candidate	Votes	%	±%
INC	N. S. Boseraju	38,620	38.75%	▼12.41
Independent	Basanagouda Byagawat	28,513	28.61%	New
JD(S)	Gangadhar Nayak	20,623	20.69%	▲8.59
BJP	Sharanappa Gouda. S	8,420	8.45%	▼20.89
JP	R. Mudukappa Nayak	3,486	3.50%	New
Margin of victory		10,107	10.14%	▼11.68
Turnout		99,730	62.17%	▼1.97
Total valid votes		99,662		
Registered electors		160,405		▲14.39
INC hold		Swing	▼12.41	

=== Assembly Election 1999 ===
1999 Karnataka Legislative Assembly election : Manvi
Party	Candidate	Votes	%	±%
INC	N. S. Boseraju	43,400	51.16%	▲23.00
BJP	Basanagouda Byagawat	24,890	29.34%	▲26.87
JD(S)	Gangadhar Nayak	10,266	12.10%	New
Independent	M. D. Nanjundaswamy	2,930	3.45%	New
Independent	N. Jagadeesh Prasad	1,580	1.86%	New
Independent	Kanakappa Tondeppa Toranadinni	750	0.88%	New
Independent	Doddanagoud	653	0.77%	New
Margin of victory		18,510	21.82%	▲19.46
Turnout		89,945	64.14%	▲3.63
Total valid votes		84,839		
Rejected ballots		5,095	5.66%	▲1.65
Registered electors		140,222		▲12.31
INC gain from JD		Swing	▲20.64	

=== Assembly Election 1994 ===
1994 Karnataka Legislative Assembly election : Manvi
Party	Candidate	Votes	%	±%
JD	Gangadhar Nayak	22,130	30.52%	▲21.99
INC	Basavana Gouda. A. Patil Byagwat	20,420	28.16%	▼2.85
KRRS	Basavaraj Ballatgi	16,349	22.55%	New
INC	Prabhakar	9,014	12.43%	New
BJP	Mallikarjun Nadagouda	1,791	2.47%	New
Independent	Ashok Byagwat	1,245	1.72%	New
Independent	N. H. Naik	438	0.60%	New
Margin of victory		1,710	2.36%	▼7.12
Turnout		75,545	60.51%	▲4.06
Total valid votes		72,504		
Rejected ballots		3,032	4.01%	▼6.84
Registered electors		124,851		▲8.26
JD gain from Independent		Swing	▼9.97	

=== Assembly Election 1989 ===
1989 Karnataka Legislative Assembly election : Manvi
Party	Candidate	Votes	%	±%
Independent	Basangouda Amaregouda	23,500	40.49%	New
INC	S. B. Amarkhed	17,998	31.01%	▼11.33
Kranti Sabha	Basavaraj Ballatgi	6,917	11.92%	New
JD	Raja Sanjeeva Nayak	4,952	8.53%	New
Independent	Kirlingappa	2,568	4.42%	New
JP	C. Obanna	1,631	2.81%	New
Independent	Syed Noorul Hassan	468	0.81%	New
Margin of victory		5,502	9.48%	▼3.85
Turnout		65,096	56.45%	▼12.31
Total valid votes		58,034		
Rejected ballots		7,062	10.85%	▲7.71
Registered electors		115,325		▲33.92
Independent gain from JP		Swing	▼15.18	

=== Assembly Election 1985 ===
1985 Karnataka Legislative Assembly election : Manvi
Party	Candidate	Votes	%	±%
JP	Thimmangouda Anwari	31,929	55.67%	▲23.47
INC	N. S. Boseraju	24,283	42.34%	▼10.17
Independent	N. Murthy	448	0.78%	New
Independent	Syed Noorul Hassan	408	0.71%	New
Margin of victory		7,646	13.33%	▼6.98
Turnout		59,211	68.76%	▲10.38
Total valid votes		57,352		
Rejected ballots		1,859	3.14%	▼1.52
Registered electors		86,117		▲13.20
JP gain from INC		Swing	▲3.16	

=== Assembly Election 1983 ===
1983 Karnataka Legislative Assembly election : Manvi
Party	Candidate	Votes	%	±%
INC	Raja Amarappa Naik Raja Jadi Somalinga Naik	22,235	52.51%	▲31.09
JP	Shiva Shankar Gouda Amarappa Gouda	13,635	32.20%	▼3.64
Independent	R. Ambanna Nayak Dorai Hanumappa Nayak	5,133	12.12%	New
Independent	K. Eshwarappa Bassanna	865	2.04%	New
Independent	Amareshappa Nagappa	474	1.12%	New
Margin of victory		8,600	20.31%	▲16.89
Turnout		44,410	58.38%	▼6.22
Total valid votes		42,342		
Rejected ballots		2,068	4.66%	▲0.03
Registered electors		76,076		▲6.21
INC gain from INC(I)		Swing	▲13.25	

=== Assembly Election 1978 ===
1978 Karnataka Legislative Assembly election : Manvi
Party	Candidate	Votes	%	±%
INC(I)	R. Ambanna Naik Dorai Hanamappa Naik	17,325	39.26%	New
JP	K. Rajasekharappa	15,817	35.84%	New
INC	Virupaksh Rao Pampapathi Rao Nadagouda	9,454	21.42%	▼40.11
Independent	Parikshit Raj Guru Rao	1,533	3.47%	New
Margin of victory		1,508	3.42%	▼22.07
Turnout		46,273	64.60%	▲11.05
Total valid votes		44,129		
Rejected ballots		2,144	4.63%	▲4.63
Registered electors		71,629		▼0.98
INC(I) gain from INC		Swing	▼22.27	

=== Assembly Election 1972 ===
1972 Mysore State Legislative Assembly election : Manvi
Party	Candidate	Votes	%	±%
INC	Bhimanna Narsappa	22,434	61.53%	▲0.90
INC(O)	A. B. Patel	13,142	36.05%	New
SWA	Vinayak Ramchandra	883	2.42%	New
Margin of victory		9,292	25.49%	▲4.23
Turnout		38,738	53.55%	▲8.06
Total valid votes		36,459		
Registered electors		72,339		▲20.34
INC hold		Swing	▲0.90	

=== Assembly Election 1967 ===
1967 Mysore State Legislative Assembly election : Manvi
Party	Candidate	Votes	%	±%
INC	B. Sharanabasawaraj	15,032	60.63%	▼8.46
Independent	C. B. Bettadur	9,760	39.37%	New
Margin of victory		5,272	21.26%	▼30.23
Turnout		27,347	45.49%	▲2.83
Total valid votes		24,792		
Registered electors		60,111		▲5.96
INC hold		Swing	▼8.46	

=== Assembly Election 1962 ===
1962 Mysore State Legislative Assembly election : Manvi
Party	Candidate	Votes	%	±%
INC	Baswarajeshwari	15,139	69.09%	▲22.02
SWA	Ramachandrarao Vinayak Rao	3,856	17.60%	New
Lok Sewak Sangh	Somangouda Veerangouda Patil	2,918	13.32%	New
Margin of victory		11,283	51.49%	▲30.32
Turnout		24,199	42.66%	▲7.38
Total valid votes		21,913		
Registered electors		56,729		▲4.40
INC hold		Swing	▲22.02	

=== Assembly Election 1957 ===
1957 Mysore State Legislative Assembly election : Manvi
Party	Candidate	Votes	%	±%
INC	Baswarajeshwari	9,023	47.07%	▲21.98
Independent	Abdul Basit	4,964	25.90%	New
Independent	Narayan Nair	2,839	14.81%	New
Independent	Hanumappa	2,343	12.22%	New
Margin of victory		4,059	21.17%	▼28.66
Turnout		19,169	35.28%	▼9.61
Total valid votes		19,169		
Registered electors		54,337		▼0.32
INC gain from Independent		Swing	▼27.84	

=== Assembly Election 1952 ===
1952 Hyderabad State Legislative Assembly election : Manvi
Party	Candidate	Votes	%	±%
Independent	Pampana Gowda	18,333	74.91%	New
INC	S. Rama Krishna	6,139	25.09%	New
Margin of victory		12,194	49.83%	
Turnout		24,472	44.89%	
Total valid votes		24,472		
Registered electors		54,514		
Independent win (new seat)				

== See also ==
- List of constituencies of the Karnataka Legislative Assembly
- Raichur district
