= G. Hampayya Nayak =

Indian politician (born 1939)

Gaddada Hampayya Nayak Ballatagi

Member of Karnataka Legislative Assembly
- Incumbent
- Assumed office 2023
- Preceded by: Raja Venkatappa Nayak
- Constituency: Manvi
- In office 2008–2018
- Preceded by: N. S. Boseraju
- Succeeded by: Raja Venkatappa Nayak

Personal details
- Born: 1939 (age 86–87)
- Party: Indian National Congress (2008-present)
- As of April 6, 2025

Gaddada Hampayya Nayak Ballatagi (born 1939) is an Indian politician from Karnataka. He is a three-time MLA representing Indian National Congress from Manvi Assembly constituency in the Karnataka Legislative Assembly.

G. Hampayya Nayak has been appointed as Chairman Tungabhadra Command Area Development Authority in 2016.

== Early life and education ==
Nayak is from Manvi, Raichur district, Karnataka. He was born to Gaddada Ramayya Gowda, a farmer. He passed Class 10.

== Career ==
Nayak became an MLA for the third time winning the 2023 Karnataka Legislative Assembly election on a Congress ticket from Manvi. He polled 66,922 votes and defeated his nearest rival, A. Bhagavantaray of the Bharatiya Janata Party, by 7,719 votes. He became an MLA for the first time winning the 2008 Karnataka Legislative Assembly election representing the Indian National Congress party. In 2008, he defeated his nearest rival Gangadhar Nayak of the BJP by a margin of 2,519 votes. He retained the Manvi seat for Congress in the 2013 election defeating Raja Venkatappa Nayak of the Janata Dal (Secular) by a margin of 6,987 votes. Then, he lost the next election in 2018, finishing a distant fourth behind eventual winner Raja Venkatappa Nayak.
