= Siddaramaiah =

Chief Minister of Karnataka from 2013 to 2018 and 2023 to 2026

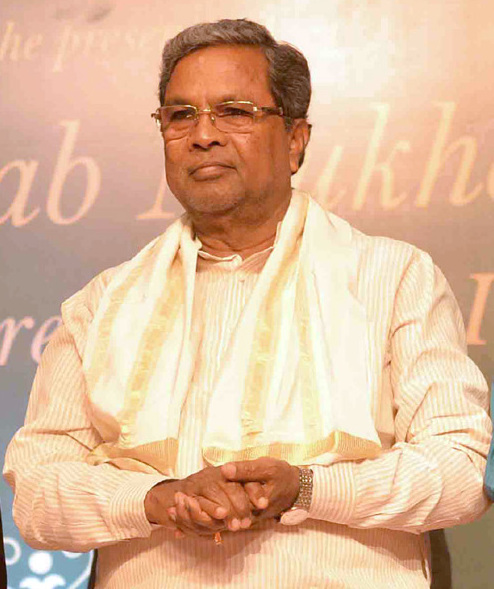
- Siddaramaiah

16th Chief Minister of Karnataka
- In office 20 May 2023 – 3 June 2026
- Governor: Thawar Chand Gehlot
- Deputy: D. K. Shivakumar
- Preceded by: Basavaraj Bommai
- Succeeded by: D. K. Shivakumar
- In office 13 May 2013 – 17 May 2018
- Governor: H. R. Bhardwaj; Konijeti Rosaiah; Vajubhai Vala
- Preceded by: Jagadish Shettar
- Succeeded by: B. S. Yediyurappa

Member of Karnataka Legislative Assembly
- Incumbent
- Assumed office 13 May 2023
- Preceded by: Yathindra Siddaramaiah
- Constituency: Varuna
- In office 17 May 2018 – 13 May 2023
- Preceded by: B B Chimmanakatti
- Succeeded by: Bhimsen Chimmanakatti
- Constituency: Badami
- In office 2008–2018
- Preceded by: Constituency established
- Succeeded by: Yathindra Siddaramaiah
- Constituency: Varuna
- In office 2004–2008
- Preceded by: A. S. Guruswamy
- Succeeded by: M. Satyanarayana
- Constituency: Chamundeshwari
- In office 1994–1999
- Preceded by: M. Rajasekara Murthy
- Succeeded by: A. S. Guruswamy
- Constituency: Chamundeshwari.
- In office 1983–1989
- Preceded by: D. Jayadevaraja Urs
- Succeeded by: M. Rajasekara Murthy
- Constituency: Chamundeshwari

Deputy Chief Minister of Karnataka
- In office 28 May 2004 – 5 August 2005
- Chief Minister: Dharam Singh
- Preceded by: Himself
- Succeeded by: M. P. Prakash
- In office 16 May 1996 – 22 July 1999
- Chief Minister: J. H. Patel
- Preceded by: J. H. Patel
- Succeeded by: Himself

Leader of the Opposition in Karnataka Legislative Assembly
- In office 9 October 2019 – 20 May 2023
- Preceded by: B. S. Yediyurappa
- Succeeded by: R. Ashoka
- In office 8 June 2009 – 12 May 2013
- Preceded by: Mallikarjun Kharge
- Succeeded by: H. D. Kumaraswamy

Personal details
- Born: Siddaramaiah Siddarame Gowda; 3 August 1947 (age 79) Siddaramana Hundi, Kingdom of Mysore (present–day Karnataka, India)
- Party: Indian National Congress (since 2006)
- Other political affiliations: All India Progressive Janata Dal (2005-2006); Janata Dal (Secular) (1999–2005); Janata Dal (1988–1999); Janata Party (1984–1988); Lok Dal (1983–1984)
- Spouse: Parvathi Siddaramaiah
- Children: 2; including Yathindra
- Education: Yuvaraja's College, Mysore (BSc); Sarada Vilas College (LL.B.)

Siddaramaiah (born 3 August 1947), also referred to by his nickname Siddu, (Note: Sources calling the subject Siddu —"CM Siddu confident of winning in coming election – Mysuru Today". —"Vishwanath backs Ibrahim, says many are not happy with CM Siddu". coastaldigest.com – The Trusted News Portal of India. —Big Kannada push ahead of polls; CM Siddu appeases pro Kannada outfits, archived from the original on 21 December 2021 —"Karnataka CM Siddu's 'Bhagya' budgets swell debt burden to Rs 2.86 lakh crore". The New Indian Express. Archived from the original on 21 February 2018. —"CM Siddu to Modi: Give Bharat Ratna to Siddaganga seer". Asianet News Network Pvt Ltd. —shastri, vittal (6 May 2018). "Get famous, elect your next CM: Siddu to Badami". Deccan Chronicle. —"Hegde was my political guide, not Deve Gowda, says CM Siddu". Star of Mysore. 22 February 2018. —"UP BJP loses 3rd MLA to Covid – Mysuru Today". —Kannada, TV9 (2 May 2021). FMR CM Siddu: ಆರೋಗ್ಯ ಸಚಿವರಿಗೇ ಫೋನ್ ಮಾಡಿದ್ದೀನಿ ಆದ್ರೂ ರೆಮ್ಡಿಸಿವರ್ ಇಂಜೆಕ್ಷನ್ ಸಿಗಲಿಲ್ಲ. TV9 Kannada (in Kannada). Archived from the original on 9 August 2021.) is an Indian politician, lawyer, former lecturer and statesman who served as the 16th Chief Minister of Karnataka from 2013 to 2018 and 2023 to 2026. He had completed his first term being only the second person to complete a full five year term. He currently serves as a member of the Congress Working Committee.

He belongs to the Indian National Congress and is formerly the leader of the Congress Legislative Party. He represented the Varuna Assembly constituency from 2023, previously from 2008 to 2018, Badami Assembly constituency from 2018 to 2023, and Chamundeshwari Assembly constituency from 2004 to 2007, 1994 to 1999, and from 1983 to 1989 in the Karnataka Legislative Assembly. He served as the Deputy Chief Minister of Karnataka from 1996 to 1999 and from 2004 to 2005 while he was a member of the Janata Dal and Janata Dal (Secular). He also served as the Leader of the Opposition in the Karnataka Legislative Assembly on two occasions, from 2009 to 2013 and from 2019 to 2023. Siddaramaiah was a member of various Janata Parivar factions for several years.

== Early life and career ==
Siddaramaiah was born to Siddarame Gowda and Boramma at a remote village called Siddaramanahundi in Varuna Hobli near T. Narasipura of Mysore district in a farming family. He is the fourth among six siblings, and he belongs to the Kuruba Gowda community.

Siddaramaiah studied at Mount Carmel School and completed his schooling from Vidyavardhaka High School, which is managed by Vidyavardhaka Sangha (VVS), Mysuru. He then went on to do his B.Sc. and LL.B. from Mysore University.

Siddaramaiah was a junior under a well-renowned lawyer, P. M. Chikkaboraiah, in Mysore and later taught law for some time at Vidyavardhaka Law College managed by Vidyavardhaka Sangha (VVS), Mysuru.

== Personal life ==
Siddaramaiah is married to Parvathi and had two sons. His elder son, Rakesh, who was seen as his father's heir in politics, died of multiple organ failure in 2016 at the age of 38. His other son, Yathindra, contested the 2018 Legislative Assembly elections and won from the seat of Varuna in Mysuru, formerly his father's seat, by over 45,000 votes.

Siddaramaiah has stated on record that he is an atheist, though he has more recently clarified his public stance on the subject: "Word has spread that I am an atheist, which I am not. I am spiritual -- I have participated in festivities as child. I have visited some of the popular pilgrimage centres. But I am definitely against superstition, as I view everything from a scientific point of view".

== Political career ==
Siddaramaiah's political career began when Nanjunda Swamy, a lawyer in Mysore, spotted him at the district courts as a law graduate. He was asked to contest and was elected to the Mysore Taluka. He contested on a Bharatiya Lok Dal ticket from Chamundeshwari constituency and entered the 7th Karnataka Legislative Assembly in 1983.

Later he joined the ruling Janata Party and became the first president of the Kannada Surveillance Committee (Kannada Kavalu Samiti), set up to supervise the implementation of Kannada as an official language. During the mid-term polls in 1985, Siddaramaiah was re-elected from the same constituency and became Minister for Animal Husbandry and Veterinary Services. In Chief Minister Ramakrishna Hegde's government, he handled diverse portfolios such as Sericulture, Animal Husbandry and Transport at different stages.

He first failed in the 1989 Assembly elections, beaten by a veteran Congress leader, M. Rajasekara Murthy. Later in 1992, he was appointed Secretary General of Janata Dal, which H. D. Deve Gowda, also called as HDK had also joined. He was elected again in the 1994 State Elections and became the minister for finance in the Janata Dal government headed by Deve Gowda. He was made Deputy Chief Minister when J. H. Patel became Chief Minister in 1996. He was sacked as Deputy Chief Minister and dropped from the Cabinet on 22 July 1999. After the split in the Janata Dal, he joined the Janata Dal (Secular) faction of Deve Gowda and became the president of its state unit. However, he lost in the 1999 state elections. In 2004, when the Indian National Congress and JD (S) formed a coalition government with Dharam Singh as Chief Minister, he was again appointed Deputy Chief Minister. He addressed ahimsa samavesha in Hubli, which had the huge public gathering. He even challenged Reddy brothers in the house when he was the leader of the opposition that he would come to Bellary through padayatra. It garnered attention of whole state and eventually Siddaramaiah came to power in 2013.

Siddaramaiah celebrated his 75th birthday on 3 August 2022 in Davanagere and called it "Siddaramotsav", where more than 2 crore followers of Siddaramaiah had attended the program.

=== Indian National Congress ===
In 2005, after differences with H. D. Deve Gowda, Siddaramaiah was expelled from JD (S). He wanted to revive a regional party "ABPJD" in the state after quitting the JD (S), but he did not because regional parties formed earlier in Karnataka had not survived. He subsequently garnered mass support from the backward classes and joined the Congress at a large public meeting held in Bangalore, in Sonia Gandhi's presence. He won the Chamundeshwari by polls held in December 2006, by a margin of 257 votes against M. Shivabasappa of JD (S), despite a fierce campaign against him by Deve Gowda, Chief Minister Kumaraswamy and Deputy Chief Minister Yeddyurappa in the constituency. In the 2008 state Assembly elections, he contested from Varuna Constituency and was re-elected for the fifth time.

He won the 2013 election from the same constituency (Varuna) on 8 May 2013 and was reelected for the 7th time. He was elected as the leader of the Congress legislative party in the Karnataka assembly on 10 May 2013. He had previously announced that the 2013 Assembly election would be his last election, but in the 2018 Karnataka Legislative Assembly election, he left his safe Varuna seat for his son, and he himself went on to contest from two constituencies, i.e. Chamundeshwari and Badami, and faced stiff competition against GT Devegowda of JD (S) and B. Sriramulu of BJP respectively, latter of which were new constituency for him. He lost in Chamundeshwari, but won in Badami vidhana sabha seat beating BJP heavyweight Sriramulu with a narrow margin of 1,696 votes and he was reelected for the 8th time. Congress under his leadership then supported the Janata Dal (Secular) in forming the government in 2018 to keep BJP out of power. He was the chairman of coordination committee that coordinated the congress-JDS coalition govt under H. D Kumarswamy. After the resignation of 17 MLAs, leading to the downfall of the coalition government, Siddaramaiah took the leadership of the upcoming by-elections in Karnataka.

The by-polls were held on 5 December 2019 for the 15 assembly seats. Though Siddaramaiah expressed his confidence in winning 12 out of the 15 contested seats, Congress managed to win only 2 seats and the JDS winning none of it. This was a major setback for his leadership and differences arose among his own party members questioning his leadership. Thus Siddaramaiah resigned as the Leader of the CLP and the Leader of opposition of the Karnataka Legislative Assembly on 9 December.

In the 2023 Karnataka legislative assembly election, Siddaramaiah contested from Varuna constituency and won. This makes his 9th election win. He was sworn in as chief minister for the second time.

== First term as chief minister (2013–2018) ==
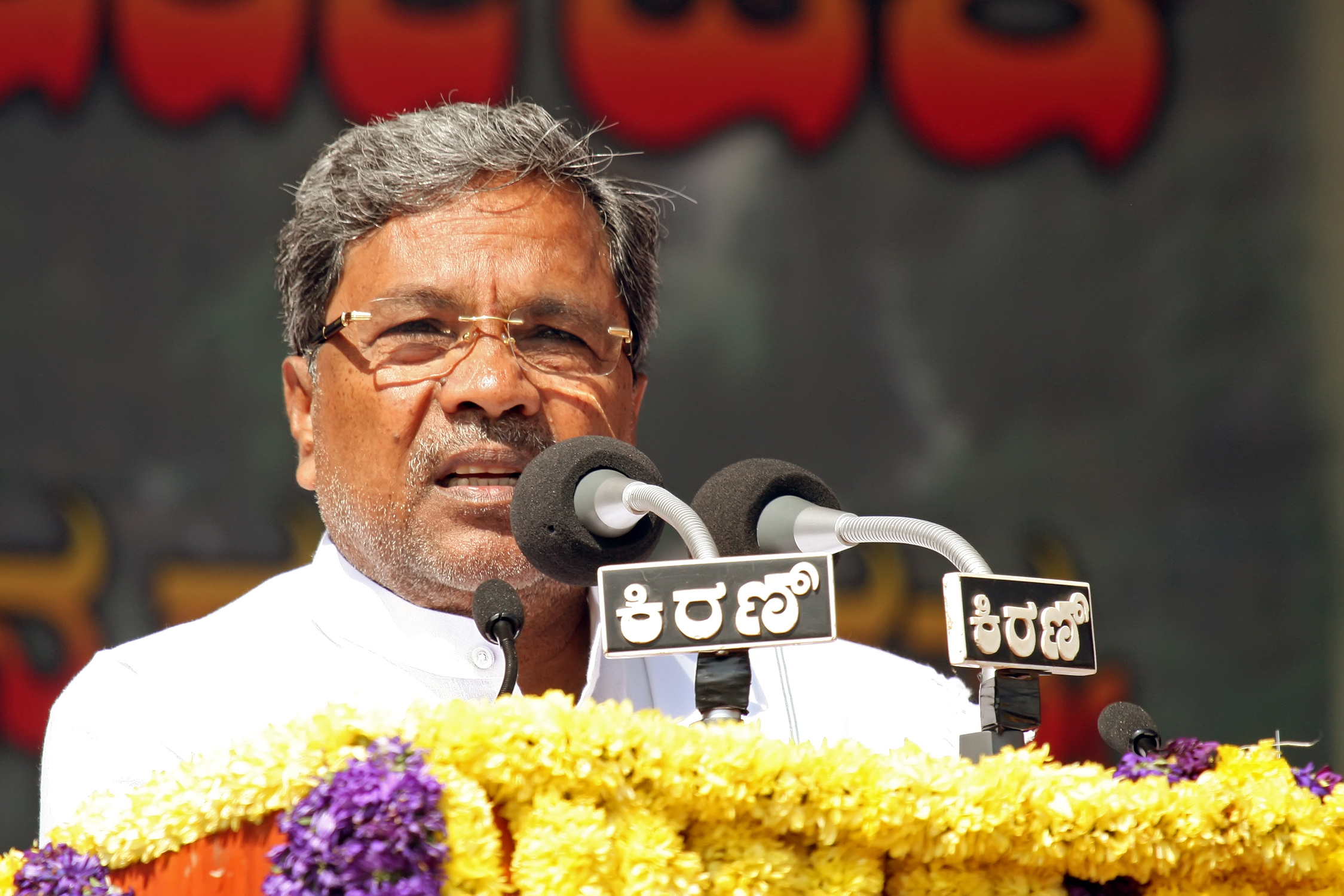
Siddaramaiah in 2013

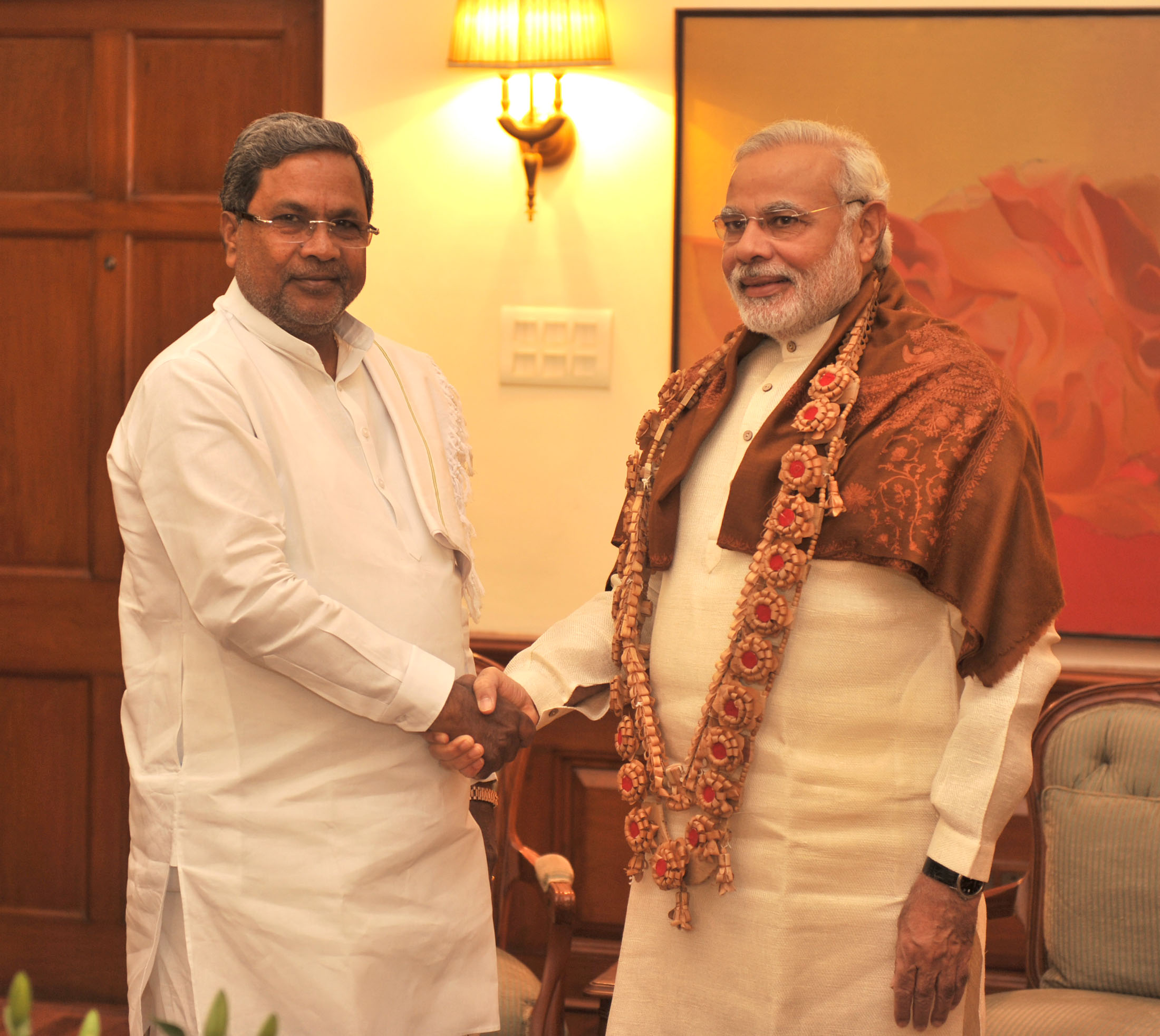
Chief Minister of Karnataka, Siddaramaiah calling on the Prime Minister, Narendra Modi

Siddaramaiah was elected as Chief Minister after Congress adopted a secret ballot to select the new chief minister. He led the Indian National Congress to victory by achieving an absolute majority of 122/224 seats in the 2013 Legislative Assembly election.

On 15 May 2018, he resigned from his position of chief minister of Karnataka, respecting the verdict of the 2018 Karnataka Legislative Assembly election. He also became the first chief minister of Karnataka to serve full 5 years term in 40 years, and the second in the history of the southern state after Devaraj Urs. He also holds the record of presenting state budget 13 times as a finance minister in Government of Karnataka. Despite allegations of mounting debt on state exchequer by the opposition, he is known for maintaining fiscal prudence within the ambit of Fiscal Responsibility and Budget Management Act of the state.

== Second term as chief minister (2023–2026) ==
After the Congress emerged victorious in the 2023 legislative assembly election, Siddaramaiah was again elected Chief Minister, and D. K. Shivakumar was appointed his deputy. After the first cabinet meet, Siddaramaiah announced that all "5 guarantees" announced in the party's manifesto had been approved and would be brought into effect in the following cabinet meet. He also insisted that the officers roll back his "zero-traffic" protocol to avoid traffic congestion problems for the public. His council of ministers was named the following week and was reported that he would hold finance, cabinet affairs and all unallocated portfolios.

His cabinet approved reverting changes by the previous BJP government in school textbooks, which included removing lessons on RSS founder K. B. Hedgewar and Hindutva figure Vinayak Damodar Savarkar, launched a scheme providing free bus rides to women in the Karnataka state buses and announced implementation of other four pre-poll guarantees in the state budget.

In July 2023, he tabled the state budget for the record 14th time in state's history. He increased taxes on liquor, beer, stamp duty and registration of properties, and certain vehicle categories to fund the above-mentioned schemes.

In July 2024 his cabinet approved a bill to reserve 50% to 75% jobs to native Kannada speakers, and 100% reservation for Group C and D employees in private and IT sectors. This idea received large opposition from people like Mohandas Pai, Kiran Mazumdar and others and hence the passing of the bill was postponed.

=== Challenges ===
In July 2023, the state witnessed series of killings which included an on-duty police constable crushed to death by a sand mafia truck, Jain monk Nandhi Maharaj from Belgaum, a worker named Venugopal in T. Narasipur and a double murder of CEO and MD of a company in Bangalore. This led to criticism of law and order situation within the state.

In July 2024, his cabinet minister B. Nagendra was accused of money transfers of around ₹1.87 billion into various bank accounts from the SC-ST Valmiki funds, in a suicide victim's death note. With these accusations prevailing the minister was asked to step down, and the Enforcement Directorate instigated the investigation taking him into custody. Siddaramaiah too agreed upon the illegal transactions on the floor of the house, but stated that it was ₹89 crores and not ₹187 crores.

On 28 May 2026, Siddaramaiah resigned as the Chief Minister amid prolonged speculation over a leadership transition. He cited that he had agreed upon his party high command's direction to resign upon completing 3 years in office. His resignation followed months of internal discussions and a reported power-sharing arrangement with Shivakumar.

== Corruption allegations and controversies ==
The Karnataka Lokayukta has filed 61 corruption cases, out of which 11 were disposed of as of 2019. Siddaramaiah has 50 cases pending against him in the Lokayukta.

=== MUDA Land Allotment Controversy ===
In August 2024, social activist T. J. Abraham filed a formal complaint with the Governor of Karnataka, alleging that Chief Minister Siddaramaiah had misused his position to influence the Mysore Urban Development Authority (MUDA) in allotting 14 residential plots in Mysuru to his wife, B. M. Parvathi. The allegations sparked political uproar, with opposition parties demanding Siddaramaiah's resignation and staging a protest march from Bengaluru to Mysuru. Further on 17 August the governor Thawar Chand Gehlot issued a prosecution notice against the chief minister to proceed investigations, based on these alleged irregularities.

In response, Siddaramaiah filed a petition challenging the governor's sanction, arguing that the decision was unconstitutional and lacked due diligence. On 24 September the High Court of Karnataka issued its judgement dismissing the petition, and stated that the "Governor has the provision to use independent decisions in such exceptional cases, and has used abundant application of mind, while the case would undoubtedly require investigation since the beneficiary is the family of the petitioner Siddaramaiah".

On 25 September 2024, the Special Court for People's Representatives ordered a comprehensive investigation into the allegations and transferred the case to the Karnataka Lokayukta Mysore division. The court also directed that a report be submitted within three months.

Subsequently, on April 16, 2024, the Karnataka High Court issued notices to Siddaramaiah and his wife, B.M. Parvathi, in response to a petition requesting a CBI investigation into the alleged MUDA land allotment scam.

=== Valmiki Development Corporation fund misappropriation (2024) ===
In May 2024, the Karnataka government's Valmiki Development Corporation, which focuses on the welfare of Scheduled Tribes, became embroiled in a financial scandal following the suicide of Chandrasekharan P., an accounts superintendent at the corporation. In a purported suicide note, Chandrasekharan alleged that over ₹1.87 billion had been illegally diverted from the corporation's accounts to private companies, including information technology firms and a cooperative bank based in Hyderabad, without proper approval.

The scandal led to the resignation and subsequent arrest of B. Nagendra, then Minister for Scheduled Tribes Welfare and ex-officio chairman of the corporation. Opposition parties, particularly the Bharatiya Janata Party (BJP) and Janata Dal (Secular), alleged that the misappropriation occurred with the knowledge of senior officials in the government. Union Minister Pralhad Joshi accused Chief Minister Siddaramaiah and Deputy Chief Minister D. K. Shivakumar of being aware of the irregularities and called for their resignation.

Siddaramaiah denied any personal involvement or prior knowledge of the alleged misappropriation and ordered an investigation by the Criminal Investigation Department (CID). As of June 2025, the investigation was ongoing, with multiple arrests made.

== Electoral performance ==
=== Karnataka Legislative Assembly Elections ===
Year	Constituency	Party	Votes	%	Opponent	Party	Votes	%	Result	Margin	%
2023	Varuna	INC	119,816	60.09	V. Somanna	BJP	73,653	36.94	Won	+46,163	+23.15
2018	Badami	INC	67,599	41.24	B. Sriramulu	BJP	65,903	40.20	Won	+1,696	+1.04
2018	Chamundeshwari	INC	85,283	37.69	G. T. Devegowda	JD(S)	121,325	53.62	Lost	-36,042	-15.93
2013	Varuna	INC	84,385	52.53	Kapu Siddalingaswamy	KJP	54,744	34.08	Won	+29,641	+18.45
2008	Varuna	INC	71,908	50.23	L. Revanasiddaiah	BJP	53,071	37.07	Won	+18,837	+13.16
2006 (Note: By-election)	Chamundeshwari	INC	115,512	47.24	Shivabasappa	JD(S)	115,255	47.14	Won	+257	+0.10
2004	Chamundeshwari	JD(S)	90,727	43.43	Revanna Siddaiah	INC	58,382	27.95	Won	+32,345	+15.48
1999	Chamundeshwari	JD(S)	50,907	30.66	A. S. Guruswamy	INC	57,107	34.40	Lost	-6,200	-3.74
1994	Chamundeshwari	JD	76,823	54.46	A. S. Guruswamy	INC	44,668	31.67	Won	+32,155	+22.79
1989	Chamundeshwari	JD	36,483	36.27	M. Rajasekara Murthy	INC	42,892	42.64	Lost	-6,409	-6.37
1985	Chamundeshwari	JP	33,725	43.45	K. Ranganaika	INC	25,454	32.80	Won	+8,271	+10.65
1983	Chamundeshwari	IND	26,614	43.33	Jayadevaraje Urs	INC	23,110	37.63	Won	+3,504	+5.70

=== Lok Sabha Elections ===
Year	Constituency	Party	Votes	%	Opponent	Party	Votes	%	Result	Margin	%
1980	Mysore	JP(S)	8,327	2.10	M. Rajasekara Murthy	INC(I)	195,724	49.46	Lost	-187,397	-47.36
1991	Koppal	JD	229,979	41.96	Basavaraj Patil Anwari	INC	241,176	44.00	Lost	-11,197	-2.04

== Positions held ==
Sl no.	Term of office	Party	Position
1.	16 May 1996 – 22 July 1999	Janata Dal	Deputy Chief Minister of Karnataka
2.	28 May 2004 – 5 August 2005	Janata Dal (Secular)	Deputy Chief Minister of Karnataka
3.	13 May 2013 – 17 May 2018	Indian National Congress	Chief Minister of Karnataka
4.	20 May 2023 – 3 June 2026	Indian National Congress	Chief Minister of Karnataka

=== Other positions held ===
- Minister for Finance, Karnataka (1994)
- Minister for Animal Husbandry and Veterinary Services (1985)
- Minister for Sericulture and Animal Husbandry
- Minister for Transport
- Minister for Higher Education
- Member, Congress Working Committee
- He has represented Chamundeshwari, Varuna, and Badami Vidhana Sabha seats at various points of his career so far.

== See also ==
- Siddaramaiah ministry

== Notes ==
Political offices
Preceded by J. H. Patel	Deputy Chief Minister of Karnataka; 31 May 1996 – 22 July 1999	Succeeded by Office Vacant
Preceded by Office Vacant	Deputy Chief Minister of Karnataka; 28 May 2004 – 5 August 2005	Succeeded by M. P. Prakash
Preceded by Jagadish Shettar	Chief Minister of Karnataka; 13 May 2013 – 15 May 2018	Succeeded by B. S. Yeddyurappa
