= Hadinaru =

- village
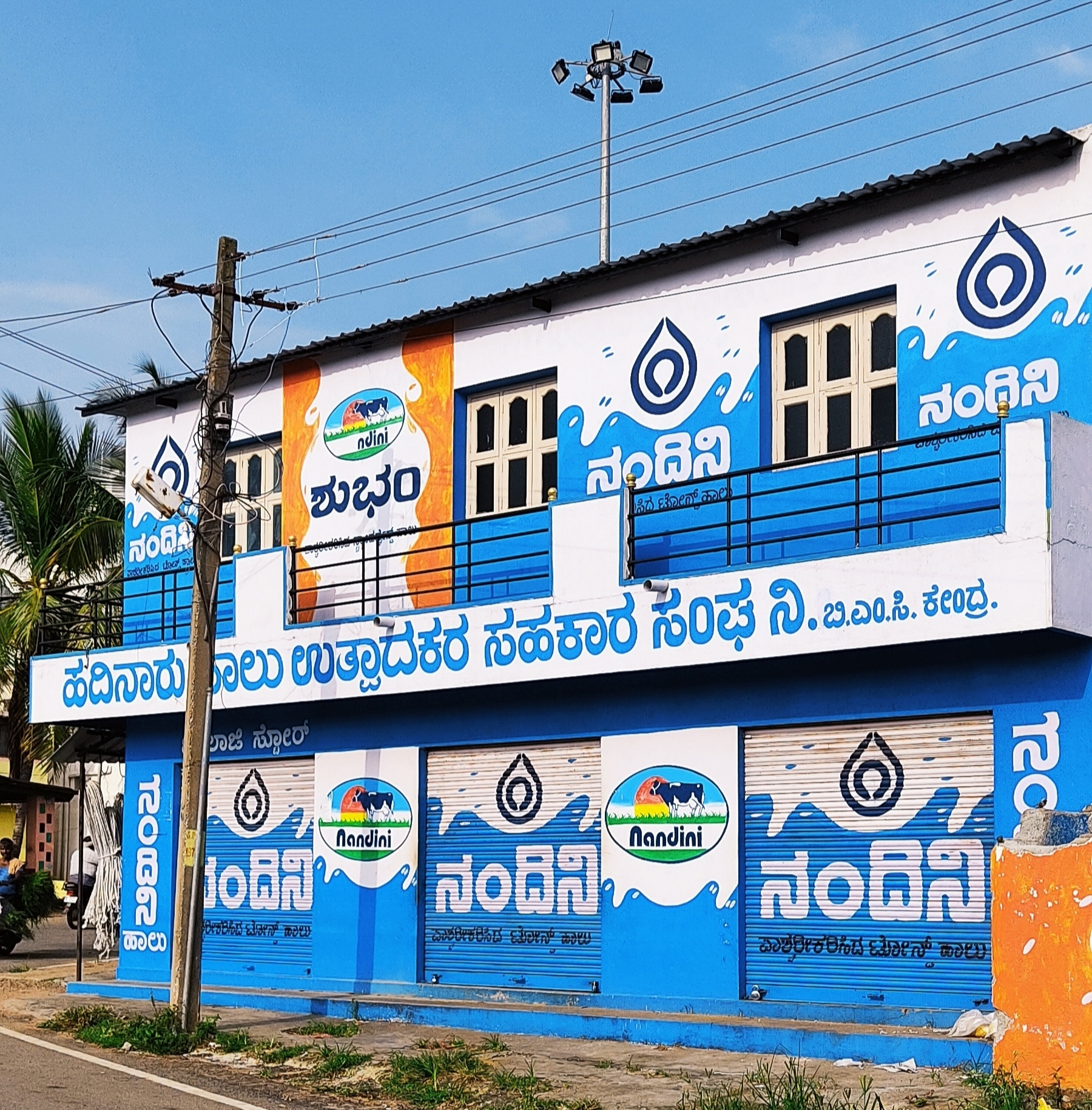
- Milk dairy
- Interactive map of Hadinaru
- Country: India
- State: Karnataka
- District: Mysore
- Talukas: Nanjangud

Government
  - Type: Panchayat raj
  - Body: Gram panchayat

Population (2001)
  - Total: 10,000

Languages
  - Official: Kannada
- Time zone: UTC+5:30 (IST)
- ISO 3166 code: IN-KA
- Vehicle registration: KA
- Website: karnataka.gov.in

Hadinaru is a village in the southern state of Karnataka, it is believed to be the origin place of Mysuru Odeyars (Wodeyars), India. It is located in the Nanjangud taluk of Mysore district in Karnataka.

== Demographics ==
As of 2001 India census, Hadinaru had a population of 6136 with 3113 males and 3023 females.

== See also ==
- Mysore
- Districts of Karnataka
