= Vidya Vardhaka Sangha High School =

Vidyavardhaka Sangha
- Mysore; India

Information
- Type: Public
- Established: 1948
- School district: mysore
- President: Gundappa Gowda
- Website: vvce.ac.in

Vidya Vardhaka Sangha High School is a school in Mysore, Karnataka, India. It was established in 1948 by the politician Kalastavadi Puttaswamy and Sahukar Channayya in Mysore with an intention of propagating education to the poorer sections of the society, at a small choultry in Mysore. The school provides education at nursery, primary, junior, high school and degree level, with subjects including law, engineering, ITI, diploma and management courses, including Vidyavardhaka College of Engineering.
