= Siddaramaiah ministry =

Siddaramaiah ministry may refer to these cabinets headed by Indian politician Siddaramaiah as Chief Minister of Karnataka:

- First Siddaramaiah ministry (2013–2018)
- Second Siddaramaiah ministry (2023–)
