= Karnataka Council of Ministers =

Executive branch of the Government of Karnataka

- Council of Ministers of Karnataka
- D. K. Shivakumar ministry
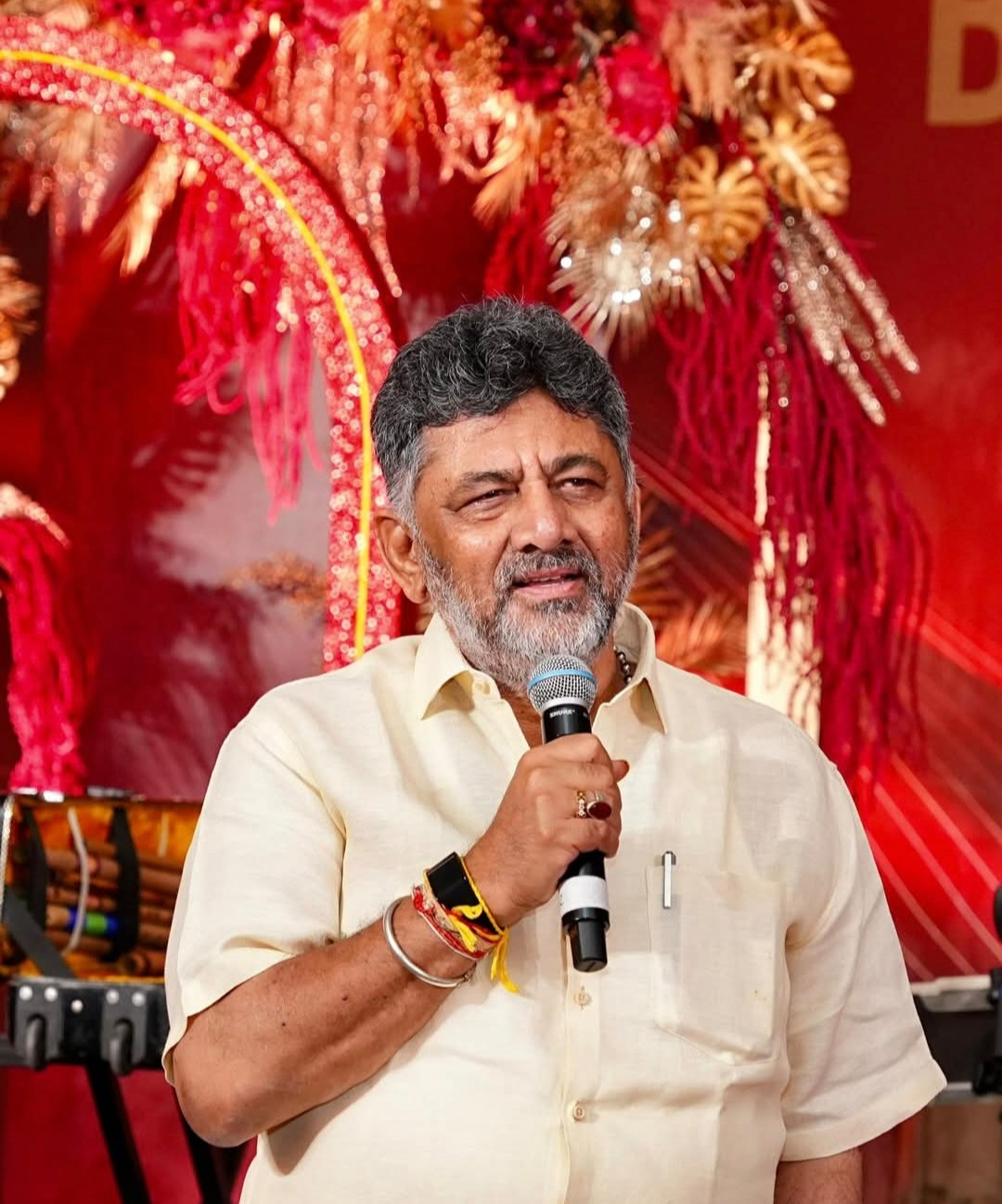
- Date established: 3 June 2026

Leadership and composition
- Head of State (Governor): Thawar Chand Gehlot
- Head of Government (Chief Minister): D. K. Shivakumar
- Deputy Head of Government (Deputy Chief Minister): G. Parameshwara
- No. of ministers: 14
- Total no. of members: 14
- Member party: Indian National Congress
- Status in legislature: Majority 134 / 224 (60%) 1 / 224 (0.4%) 2 / 224 (0.9%)
- Opposition cabinet: 66 / 224 (29%) 18 / 224 (8%) 5 / 224 (2%)
- Opposition parties: Bharatiya Janata Party (Official Opposition); Janata Dal (Secular); Other Parties
- Opposition leader: Chalavadi Narayanaswamy (Council); R. Ashoka (Assembly)

Formation and history
- Election: 2023
- Legislature term: 2023–present
- Predecessor: Second Siddaramaiah ministry

The Karnataka Council of Ministers is the executive wing of the Government of Karnataka and is headed by the Chief Minister of Karnataka, who is the head of government and leader of the state cabinet. The term of every executive wing is for 5 years. The council of ministers are assisted by bureaucrats headed by the respective department secretaries often from the Indian Administrative Service (Karnataka Cadre). The chief executive officer responsible for issuing orders on behalf of the Government is the Chief Secretary to the state government.

== Constitutional requirement ==
=== For the Council of Ministers to aid and advise Governor ===
According to Article 163 of the Constitution of India, there shall be a Council of Ministers with the Chief Minister at the head to aid and advise the Governor in the exercise of his functions. Ministers serve under the pleasure of the Governor and may be removed on the advice of the Chief Minister.

=== For other provisions as to Ministers ===
According to Article 164 of the Constitution of India, the Chief Minister shall be appointed by the Governor and the other Ministers shall be appointed by the Governor on the advice of the Chief Minister. The Council of Ministers shall be collectively responsible to the Legislative Assembly of the State. A Minister who is not a member of the Legislature for any period of six consecutive months shall cease to be a Minister.

The 91st Constitutional Amendment Act, 2003 inserted Article 164(1A), which caps the total number of ministers, including the Chief Minister, at 15 per cent of the total number of members of the Legislative Assembly, with a minimum of twelve ministers. For Karnataka's 224-member Assembly, this places the maximum cabinet size at 34 ministers.

== Chief Minister ==
The Chief Minister of Karnataka is the real head of the government and responsible for state administration. He is the leader of the parliamentary party in the legislature and heads the state cabinet. The current Chief Minister is D. K. Shivakumar, who was sworn in on 3 June 2026 following the resignation of Siddaramaiah. On 30 May 2026, Shivakumar was unanimously elected leader of the Congress Legislature Party at a meeting held at Vidhana Soudha, with Siddaramaiah himself proposing his name.

== Deputy Chief Minister ==
The Deputy Chief Minister of Karnataka is the senior minister of the cabinet after the Chief Minister. The current Deputy Chief Minister is G. Parameshwara, who was sworn in alongside Shivakumar on 3 June 2026.

== State Cabinet ==
As per the Constitution of India, all portfolios of state government are vested in the Chief Minister, who distributes various portfolios to individual ministers whom he nominates to the State Governor. The state governor appoints individual ministers for various portfolios and departments as per the advice of the Chief Minister, and together they form the State Cabinet. Actions of individual ministers are part of the collective responsibility of the state cabinet, and the Chief Minister is responsible for the actions of each minister. The state cabinet along with the Chief Minister prepares general policy and individual department policy, which guides the day-to-day administration of each minister.

== Council of Ministers ==
Portfolio allocations for the initial 14-member ministry (including the Chief Minister) are per Governor's Notification No. GS 57 GOB 2026, dated 4 June 2026, as subsequently clarified. Nineteen further ministers were sworn in on 3 August 2026, bringing the Council to 33 members including the Chief Minister; portfolio allocations for these 19 had not been formally notified as of the time of their swearing-in and are marked as pending below. A twentieth minister cleared by the Congress high command for the August expansion, MLC Gayathri Shanthegowda, had not been sworn in as of this revision (see Cabinet expansion). Sources:

Sr. No.	Name	Portrait	Constituency	Designation	Portfolio(s)	Party	Term of Office		
Sr. No.	Name	Portrait	Constituency	Designation	Portfolio(s)	Party	Took Office	Left Office	Duration
Chief Minister
1	D. K. Shivakumar		Kanakapura	Chief Minister	Finance; Cabinet Affairs; Dept. of Personnel and Administrative Reforms; Intelligence; Bengaluru Development Authority (BDA); Bengaluru Metropolitan Region Development Authority (BMRDA); All unallocated portfolios	INC	3 June 2026	Incumbent	64 days
Deputy Chief Minister
2	G. Parameshwara		Koratagere	Deputy Chief Minister	Revenue; Sports	INC	3 June 2026	Incumbent	64 days
Cabinet Ministers
3	K. H. Muniyappa		Devanahalli	Cabinet Minister	Food & Civil Supplies; Consumer Affairs	INC	3 June 2026	Incumbent	64 days
4	K. J. George		Sarvagnanagar	Cabinet Minister	Energy; Tourism	INC	3 June 2026	Incumbent	64 days
5	M. B. Patil		Babaleshwar	Cabinet Minister	Large & Medium Industries; Infrastructure Development	INC	3 June 2026	Incumbent	64
6	Satish Jarkiholi		Yemkanmardi	Cabinet Minister	Public Works	INC	3 June 2026	Incumbent	64 days
7	Krishna Byre Gowda		Byatarayanapura	Cabinet Minister	Greater Bengaluru Development (Note: (including Greater Bengaluru Authority — GBA, Bengaluru North City Corporation — BNCC, Bengaluru South City Corporation — BSCC, Bengaluru East City Corporation — BECC, Bengaluru West City Corporation — BWCC, Bengaluru Central City Corporation — BCCC, Bengaluru Water Supply & Sewerage Board — BWSSB, Bengaluru Metro Rail Corporation Limited — BMRCL))	INC	3 June 2026	Incumbent	64 days
8	Priyank Kharge		Chittapur	Cabinet Minister	Home (excluding Intelligence); Information Technology & Biotechnology; E-Governance	INC	3 June 2026	Incumbent	64 days
9	U. T. Khader		Mangalore	Cabinet Minister	Health & Family Welfare	INC	3 June 2026	Incumbent	64 days
10	Eshwara Khandre		Bhalki	Cabinet Minister	Rural Development; Panchayati Raj	INC	3 June 2026	Incumbent	64 days
11	Yathindra Siddaramaiah		MLC	Cabinet Minister	Urban Development (Note: (including Karnataka Urban Water Supply and Drainage Board — KUWSDB, Karnataka Urban Infrastructure Development and Finance Corporation — KUIDFC, all Urban Development Authorities and Local Planning Authorities; excluding BDA, BMRDA, GBA, Commissionerate of Town & Country Planning))	INC	3 June 2026	Incumbent	64 days
12	Byrathi Suresh		Hebbal	Cabinet Minister	Transport	INC	3 June 2026	Incumbent	64 days
13	Sharan Prakash Patil		Sedam	Cabinet Minister	Medical Education; Skill Development	INC	3 June 2026	Incumbent	64 days
14	Ramalinga Reddy		B.T.M Layout	Cabinet Minister	Major and Medium Irrigation	INC	3 June 2026	Incumbent	64 days (Note: Reddy tendered his resignation on 5 June 2026, citing dissatisfaction with the portfolio allocated to him; the Congress high command rejected the resignation on 6 June 2026 and he continued in office without a break in tenure. See Controversies.)
15	B. Z. Zameer Ahmed Khan		Chamrajpet	Cabinet Minister	Pending notification	INC	3 August 2026	Incumbent	3 days
16	Santosh Lad		Kalghatgi	Cabinet Minister	Pending notification	INC	3 August 2026	Incumbent	3 days
17	Rizwan Arshad		Shivajinagar	Cabinet Minister	Pending notification	INC	3 August 2026	Incumbent	3 days
18	Madhu Bangarappa		Soraba	Cabinet Minister	Pending notification	INC	3 August 2026	Incumbent	3 days
19	B. Nagendra		Bellary Rural	Cabinet Minister	Pending notification	INC	3 August 2026	Incumbent	3 days (Note: See Controversies regarding pending CBI and ED proceedings against Nagendra.)
20	S. S. Mallikarjun		Davanagere North	Cabinet Minister	Pending notification	INC	3 August 2026	Incumbent	3 days (Note: The Congress high command's initial list, released on the morning of 3 August 2026, had named Mankal S. Vaidya (Bhatkal); the party subsequently dropped Vaidya at the last minute to accommodate Mallikarjun, reportedly to address the cabinet's Lingayat representation. Vaidya, a minister in the Second Siddaramaiah ministry, was not part of the final list sworn in.)
21	K. S. Basavanthappa		Mayakonda	Cabinet Minister	Pending notification	INC	3 August 2026	Incumbent	3 days
22	Laxman Savadi		Athani	Cabinet Minister	Pending notification	INC	3 August 2026	Incumbent	3 days
23	Vijayanand Kashappanavar		Hungund	Cabinet Minister	Pending notification	INC	3 August 2026	Incumbent	3 days
24	Basavaraj Rayareddy		Yelburga	Cabinet Minister	Pending notification	INC	3 August 2026	Incumbent	3 days
25	H. C. Balakrishna		Magadi	Cabinet Minister	Pending notification	INC	3 August 2026	Incumbent	3 days
26	K. M. Shivalinge Gowda		Arsikere	Cabinet Minister	Pending notification	INC	3 August 2026	Incumbent	3 days
27	N. Chaluvaraya Swamy		Nagamangala	Cabinet Minister	Pending notification	INC	3 August 2026	Incumbent	3 days
28	Ajay Singh		Jevargi	Cabinet Minister	Pending notification	INC	3 August 2026	Incumbent	3 days
29	P. M. Narendraswamy		Malavalli	Cabinet Minister	Pending notification	INC	3 August 2026	Incumbent	3 days
30	Shivaraj Tangadagi		Kanakagiri	Cabinet Minister	Pending notification	INC	3 August 2026	Incumbent	3 days
31	Rudrappa Lamani		Haveri	Cabinet Minister	Pending notification	INC	3 August 2026	Incumbent	3 days (Note: Lamani had served as Deputy Speaker of the Karnataka Legislative Assembly since July 2023, and presided over sittings of the Assembly during the vacancy in the Speakership that followed U. T. Khader's June 2026 resignation. He vacated the Deputy Speakership upon his own induction into the Cabinet on 3 August 2026 and was succeeded in that post by A. S. Ponnanna; the Speakership itself, which he never held, passed directly from the vacancy to Gurupadagouda Patil.)
32	T. Raghumurthy		Challakere	Cabinet Minister	Pending notification	INC	3 August 2026	Incumbent	3 days
33	C. Puttarangashetty		Chamarajanagar	Cabinet Minister	Pending notification	INC	3 August 2026	Incumbent	3 days

Awaiting induction: Gayathri Shanthegowda (MLC), the twentieth name cleared by the Congress high command for the August expansion, had not taken the ministerial oath as of this revision; her induction was deferred pending her own swearing-in as an MLC. See Cabinet expansion below.

== List of cabinets of Karnataka ==
No.	Ministry	Chief Minister	Assembly (Election)	Political party
1	K. Chengalaraya Reddy ministry	K. Chengalaraya Reddy	Legislative Assembly not yet established	Indian National Congress
2	Hanumanthaiah ministry	Kengal Hanumanthaiah	1st (1952)	Indian National Congress
3	Manjappa ministry	Kadidal Manjappa	1st (1952)	Indian National Congress
4	First Nijalingappa ministry	S. Nijalingappa	1st (1952)	Indian National Congress
5	Second Nijalingappa ministry	S. Nijalingappa	2nd (1957)	Indian National Congress
6	B. D. Jatti ministry	B. D. Jatti	2nd (1957)	Indian National Congress
7	Kanthi ministry	S. R. Kanthi	3rd (1962)	Indian National Congress
8	Third Nijalingappa ministry	S. Nijalingappa	3rd (1962)	Indian National Congress
9	Fourth Nijalingappa ministry	S. Nijalingappa	4th (1967)	Indian National Congress
10	First Veerendra Patil ministry	Veerendra Patil	4th (1967)	Indian National Congress (Organisation)
11	First Urs ministry	D. Devaraj Urs	5th (1972)	Indian National Congress (Requisitionists)
12	Second Urs ministry	D. Devaraj Urs	6th (1978)	Indian National Congress (Indira)
13	Gundu Rao ministry	R. Gundu Rao	6th (1978)	Indian National Congress (Indira)
14	First Hegde ministry	Ramakrishna Hegde	7th (1983)	Janata Party
15	Second Hegde ministry	Ramakrishna Hegde	8th (1985)	Janata Party
16	Third Hegde ministry	Ramakrishna Hegde	8th (1985)	Janata Party
17	S. R. Bommai ministry	S. R. Bommai	8th (1985)	Janata Party
18	Second Veerendra Patil ministry	Veerendra Patil	9th (1989)	Indian National Congress (Indira)
19	Bangarappa ministry	S. Bangarappa	9th (1989)	Indian National Congress (Indira)
20	Moily ministry	M. Veerappa Moily	9th (1989)	Indian National Congress (Indira)
21	Deve Gowda ministry	H. D. Deve Gowda	10th (1994)	Janata Dal
22	J. H. Patel ministry	J. H. Patel	10th (1994)	Janata Dal
23	Krishna ministry	S. M. Krishna	11th (1999)	Indian National Congress
24	Dharam Singh ministry	Dharam Singh	12th (2004)	Indian National Congress
25	First Kumaraswamy ministry	H. D. Kumaraswamy	12th (2004)	Janata Dal (Secular)
26	First Yediyurappa ministry	B. S. Yediyurappa	12th (2004)	Bharatiya Janata Party
27	Second Yediyurappa ministry	B. S. Yediyurappa	13th (2008)	Bharatiya Janata Party
28	Sadananda Gowda ministry	D. V. Sadananda Gowda	13th (2008)	Bharatiya Janata Party
29	Shettar ministry	Jagadish Shettar	13th (2008)	Bharatiya Janata Party
30	First Siddaramaiah ministry	Siddaramaiah	14th (2013)	Indian National Congress
31	Second Kumaraswamy ministry	H. D. Kumaraswamy	15th (2018)	Janata Dal (Secular)
32	Third Yediyurappa ministry	B. S. Yediyurappa	15th (2018)	Bharatiya Janata Party
33	Basavaraj Bommai ministry	Basavaraj Bommai	15th (2018)	Bharatiya Janata Party
34	Second Siddaramaiah ministry	Siddaramaiah	16th (2023)	Indian National Congress
35	D. K. Shivakumar ministry	D. K. Shivakumar	16th (2023)	Indian National Congress

== Oath as the state chief minister/minister ==
I, <Name of Chief Minister/Minister>, do swear in the name of God/solemnly affirm that I will bear true faith and allegiance to the Constitution of India as by law established, that I will uphold the sovereignty and integrity of India, that I will faithfully and conscientiously discharge my duties as a Minister for the State of () and that I will do right to all manner of people in accordance with the Constitution and the law without fear or favour, affection or ill-will.

== See also ==
- Government of Karnataka
- Karnataka Legislative Assembly
- Karnataka Legislative Council
- Chief Minister of Karnataka
- List of chief ministers of Karnataka
- List of deputy chief ministers of Karnataka
- 2023 Karnataka Legislative Assembly election
