= Ministry of Finance (Karnataka) =

Karnataka Department of Finance

Ministry of Finance, Government of Karnataka
- ಕರ್ನಾಟಕ ಹಣಕಾಸು‌ ಇಲಾಖೆ

Ministry overview
- Formed: 1 May 1956
- Jurisdiction: Government of Karnataka
- Headquarters: Vidhana Soudha, Bengaluru
- Annual budget: ₹3.71 lakh crore (2025-26)
- Minister responsible: D. K. Shivakumar, Chief Minister
- Ministry executive: Ritesh Kumar Singh (IAS), Additional Chief Secretary
- Website: finance.karnataka.gov.in

The Ministry of Finance (Hindi: ಕರ್ನಾಟಕ ಹಣಕಾಸು‌ ಇಲಾಖೆ) is a ministry within the State Government of Karnataka concerned with the economy of Karnataka, serving as the Treasury of Karnataka.

== Overview ==
Established after the States Reorganisation Act, 1956, the department gained statutory authority under the Karnataka Fiscal Responsibility and Budget Management Act, 2002.

The department is structured into three wings; the Budget wing prepares annual state budgets, the Treasury wing manages ₹1.2 lakh crore transactions annually, and the State Taxes wing oversees annual revenue of ₹80,000 crore.

Key functions of the department include formulation of state economic policies, administration of ₹3.71 lakh crore budget (as of 2025), and implementation of the KPFMS digital platform.

The 2023 Comptroller and Auditor General report noted that 32 percent of scheme funds were unutilized, there were FRBM norm violations in off-budget borrowing, and that there were implementation delays in the KPFMS digital platform.

Improvement measures include, in 2023, monthly spending reviews, and a forty percent reduction in approval layers.

== List of Finance Ministers ==
S. No	Name	Party	Term			Chief Minister	
1.	H. C. Dasappa	INC	25 October 1947	30 March 1952	4 years, 157 days	Reddy	K. Chengalaraya Reddy
2.	T. Mariappa	INC	16 November 1956	9 March 1962	5 years, 113 days	Nijalingappa I	S. Nijalingappa
2.	T. Mariappa	INC	16 November 1956	9 March 1962	5 years, 113 days	Nijalingappa II	S. Nijalingappa
2.	T. Mariappa	INC	16 November 1956	9 March 1962	5 years, 113 days	Jatti	B. D. Jatti
3.	S. R. Kanthi	INC	14 March 1962	20 June 1962	98 days	Kanthi	S. R. Kanthi
4.	B. D. Jatti	INC	21 June 1962	7 June 1965	2 years, 351 days	Nijalingappa III	S. Nijalingappa
5.	Ramakrishna Hegde	INC	7 June 1965	18 March 1971	5 years, 284 days	Nijalingappa III	S. Nijalingappa
5.	Ramakrishna Hegde	INC	7 June 1965	18 March 1971	5 years, 284 days	Nijalingappa IV	S. Nijalingappa
5.	Ramakrishna Hegde	INC	7 June 1965	18 March 1971	5 years, 284 days	Patil I	Veerendra Patil
6.	M. Y. Ghorpade	INC	20 March 1972	31 December 1977	5 years, 286 days	Urs I	D. Devaraj Urs
7.	S. M. Yahya	INC	28 February 1978	7 January 1980	1 year, 313 days	Urs II	D. Devaraj Urs
8.	M. Veerappa Moily	INC	12 January 1980	6 January 1983	2 years, 359 days	Rao	R. Gundu Rao
9.	B. S. Yediyurappa	BJP	30 May 2008	31 July 2011	3 years, 62 days	Yediyurappa II	B. S. Yediyurappa
10.	D. V. Sadananda Gowda	BJP	4 August 2011	12 July 2012	343 days	Gowda	D. V. Sadananda Gowda
11.	Jagadish Shettar	BJP	12 July 2012	13 May 2013	305 days	Shettar	Jagadish Shettar
12.	Siddaramaiah	INC	13 May 2013	15 May 2018	5 years, 2 days	Siddaramaiah I	Siddaramaiah
13.	H. D. Kumaraswamy	JD(S)	23 May 2018	23 July 2019	1 year, 61 days	Kumaraswamy II	H. D. Kumaraswamy
(9).	B. S. Yediyurappa	BJP	26 July 2019	28 July 2021	2 years, 2 days	Yediyurappa III	B. S. Yediyurappa
14.	Basavaraj Bommai	BJP	28 July 2021	20 May 2023	1 year, 296 days	B. Bommai	Basavaraj Bommai
(12).	Siddaramaiah	INC	20 May 2023	3 June 2026	3 years, 14 days	Siddaramaiah II	Siddaramaiah
15.	D. K. Shivakumar	INC	3 June 2026	Incumbent	113 days	Shivakumar	D. K. Shivakumar
