= Shivakumar ministry =

35th Council of Ministers of Karnataka, India (2026–present)

- 35th Ministry of Karnataka
- 2026–present
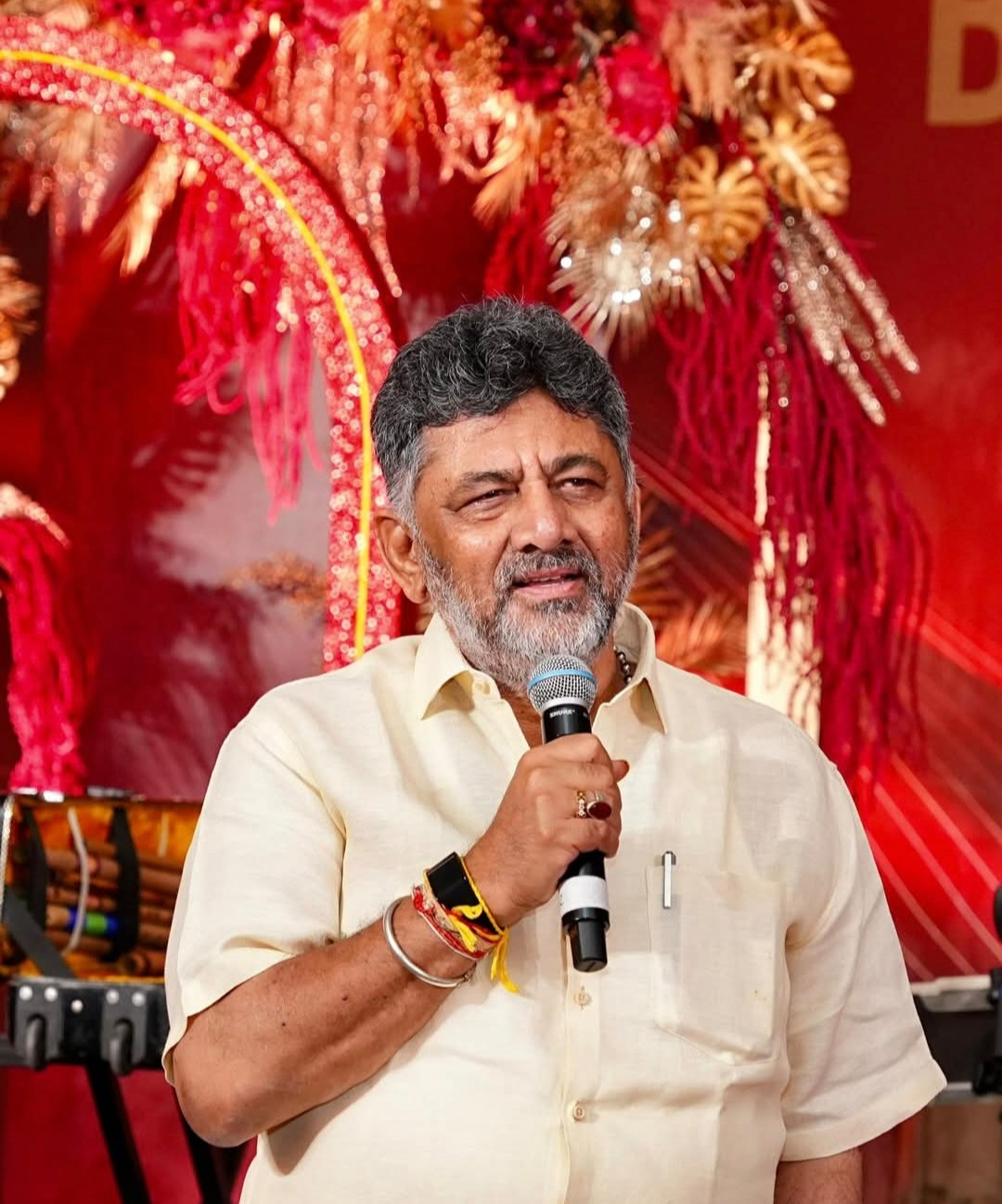
- D. K. Shivakumar in 2026
- Date formed: 3 June 2026

People and organisations
- Governor: Thawarchand Gehlot
- Chief Minister: D. K. Shivakumar
- Deputy Chief Minister: G. Parameshwara
- No. of ministers: 32
- Ministers removed: 1
- Total no. of members: 33
- Member parties: Indian National Congress
- Status in legislature: Majority
- Opposition party: Bharatiya Janata Party; Janata Dal (Secular)
- Opposition leader: Chalavadi Narayanaswamy (Council); R. Ashoka (Assembly)

History
- Election: 2023
- Legislature term: 16th Karnataka Assembly
- Budgets: 2026–27 (inherited; presented by predecessor)
- Predecessor: Second Siddaramaiah ministry

The Shivakumar Ministry (also referred to as the D. K. Shivakumar ministry) is the 35th Council of Ministers of Karnataka, headed by D. K. Shivakumar of the Indian National Congress. It was sworn in on 3 June 2026 and succeeded the Second Siddaramaiah ministry. The Governor of Karnataka, Thawarchand Gehlot, administered the oath of office and secrecy to the members of the council of ministers at the Glass House of Lok Bhavan, Bengaluru, at 4.05 pm. Prior to the ceremony, the sitting Speaker of the Karnataka Legislative Assembly, U. T. Khader, resigned from the Speakership to accept a ministerial berth in the new cabinet, leaving the post vacant pending election of a successor by the House. The Speakership remained vacant for nearly two months, with Deputy Speaker Rudrappa Lamani — in office since July 2023 — presiding over sittings of the Assembly in the interim. On 3 August 2026, the Congress high command named Gurupadagouda Patil to succeed Khader as Speaker; Lamani, inducted into the Cabinet the same day, vacated the Deputy Speakership in turn and was succeeded by Mankala Vaidya, elected on 18 August 2026.

Shivakumar's accession followed an internal Congress power-sharing arrangement under which Siddaramaiah resigned as Chief Minister after the midpoint of the term begun with the 2023 Assembly election. The transition marked the first time since 2004 that the Congress had placed a Vokkaliga leader at the head of a Karnataka government, a development widely read as a challenge to the Janata Dal (Secular)'s traditional hold on the community and as a recalibration of the party's AHINDA-based social coalition ahead of the next Assembly election, expected by May 2028.

The ministry was initially constituted with 14 members (including the Chief Minister), all carried over from the previous government except for U. T. Khader and Yathindra Siddaramaiah. Within days of formation, Cabinet Minister Ramalinga Reddy briefly tendered his resignation over a portfolio dispute; the Congress high command rejected the resignation on 6 June 2026 and Reddy continued in the ministry. The cabinet's composition at formation drew criticism from the opposition and from within the Congress for including no woman minister. On 3 August 2026, exactly two months after the ministry's formation, the Congress high command cleared the names of 20 further ministers, but only 19 of them were sworn in that day — the induction of the 20th, MLC Gayathri Shanthegowda, was deferred because she had not yet herself taken oath as a member of the Karnataka Legislative Council following a disputed 2021 Council election that the Karnataka High Court resolved in her favour in July 2026. As a result, the ministry stood at 33 members (including the Chief Minister) after the expansion, one short of the state's sanctioned strength of 34, and remained entirely male. Following B. Nagendra's resignation on 28 August 2026, the ministry fell to 32 members, with two vacancies against the sanctioned strength of 34.

== Background ==
=== Swearing-in ceremony ===
The swearing-in of the members of the council of ministers was originally planned to be held on the steps of Vidhana Soudha before a large public gathering, but was relocated to the Glass House of Lok Bhavan for a more modest ceremony, following concerns over peak-hour traffic disruption in Bengaluru. Governor Thawarchand Gehlot administered the oath of office and secrecy to a total of 14 ministers at 4:05 pm on 3 June 2026, including Chief Minister D. K. Shivakumar and Deputy Chief Minister G. Parameshwara.

Shivakumar took his oath in the name of Veera Gangadhara Ajja, the seer of the Ajjayya Mutt in Nagarbhavi, Bengaluru, whom he regards as his spiritual guide, while holding a copy of the Constitution of India. Parameshwara took oath in the name of Dr. B. R. Ambedkar; M. B. Patil in the name of Basavanna and Siddeshwar Swami; and Yathindra Siddaramaiah in the name of the Constitution. U. T. Khader and Eshwara Khandre took oath in the name of God.

The ceremony was attended by senior Congress leaders including AICC president Mallikarjun Kharge, Leader of the Opposition in the Lok Sabha Rahul Gandhi, former Chief Minister Siddaramaiah, Telangana Chief Minister Revanth Reddy, Kerala Chief Minister V. D. Satheesan, Himachal Pradesh Chief Minister Sukhvinder Singh Sukhu, AICC General Secretaries Randeep Singh Surjewala and K. C. Venugopal, Congress parliamentarian Gaurav Gogoi, and Congress leader Rajeev Shukla. Chief Justice of the Karnataka High Court Vibhu Bakhru was also present, as were film personalities including actors Dhruva Sarja, Shiva Rajkumar, Ramya, and Dhananjaya, and cricketer Anil Kumble. The event also drew religious leaders, student representatives, farmers' representatives, Dalit community leaders, and Kannada activists.

Earlier on 3 June, Shivakumar met former Prime Minister and Janata Dal (Secular) chief H. D. Deve Gowda and former Chief Minister and Bharatiya Janata Party leader B. S. Yediyurappa. Prime Minister Narendra Modi congratulated Shivakumar following the ceremony, stating that the Centre would work closely with the state government for the welfare of the people.

Portfolio allocations for the initial 14 members were formally notified by the Governor on 4 June 2026 under Notification No. GS 57 GOB 2026, issued in exercise of the powers under Clause (3) of Article 166 of the Constitution of India read with Rule 5 of the Karnataka Government (Transaction of Business) Rules, 1977.

=== Power-sharing arrangement ===
Following the 2023 Karnataka Assembly elections, the Indian National Congress formed the government under Siddaramaiah, with D. K. Shivakumar — the Karnataka Pradesh Congress Committee (KPCC) president who had led the party's election campaign — serving as Deputy Chief Minister. An internal power-sharing arrangement within the party envisaged a leadership rotation, under which Shivakumar would be elevated to Chief Minister after the midpoint of the term. Shivakumar was then an eight-time member of the Karnataka Legislative Assembly, having first been elected from the erstwhile Sathanur constituency in 1989 and representing Kanakapura since 2008. Widely regarded as the Congress party's chief troubleshooter and crisis manager in Karnataka, he was appointed KPCC president in March 2020 by AICC president Sonia Gandhi, succeeding Dinesh Gundu Rao.

This arrangement was not formally announced but was widely acknowledged in political circles, and eventually triggered months of internal speculation from late 2025 onward as Shivakumar and his supporters pushed for the transition. Siddaramaiah resigned on 28 May 2026 following direction from the Congress high command, with Governor Gehlot accepting the resignation on 29 May. The decision to resign was finalised after nearly seven hours of meetings at the AICC headquarters in New Delhi, including a one-on-one discussion between Rahul Gandhi and Siddaramaiah; Siddaramaiah subsequently proposed Shivakumar's name at the CLP meeting held at Vidhana Soudha on 30 May, where Shivakumar was unanimously elected as leader of the Karnataka Congress Legislature Party. The transition was overseen by AICC General Secretaries Venugopal and Surjewala. Shivakumar was subsequently sworn in as Chief Minister on 3 June with Parameshwara as his deputy, making him the second Vokkaliga Chief Minister of Karnataka from the Indian National Congress. The previous Vokkaliga Chief Ministers of Karnataka from the Indian National Congress was S. M. Krishna, who served from 1999 to 2004; H. D. Kumaraswamy of the Janata Dal (Secular), a Vokkaliga, held the office in 2006–07 and again in 2018–19.

=== Political significance ===
Shivakumar's elevation marked the first time the Congress had placed a Vokkaliga leader at the head of a Karnataka government since S. M. Krishna served as Chief Minister from 1999 to 2004 — a gap of more than two decades within the party. Vokkaligas, a dominant agrarian community concentrated in the Old Mysore region and the districts surrounding Bengaluru, had for much of the intervening period looked to the Janata Dal (Secular) and its patriarch H. D. Deve Gowda as their principal political vehicle. Shivakumar's ascent was therefore widely read as a direct challenge to JD(S)'s traditional hold over Vokkaliga voters, reinforced by the head of the Adichunchanagiri Mutt — the community's most influential religious institution — publicly declaring his support for Shivakumar's elevation in November 2025.

The transition also represented a shift in the Congress's internal caste axis within the state, from the AHINDA (Alpasankhyataru (minorities), Hindulidavaru (backward classes), and Dalitaru (Dalits)) coalition anchored by the outgoing Chief Minister Siddaramaiah of the Kuruba community, to a Vokkaliga-fronted leadership. Retaining the AHINDA vote bank — which had been central to the Congress's 2023 landslide — while simultaneously consolidating Vokkaliga support, was identified by analysts as the central electoral challenge facing the new government ahead of the next Assembly election, expected by May 2028. The cabinet's construction — spanning eight communities — was widely interpreted as an attempt to address this tension: three Dalit ministers covered both the right-hand and left-hand SC sub-groupings; three Lingayats balanced the other dominant-community flank; and the Deputy Chief Minister post went to a senior Dalit leader, G. Parameshwara. The 3 August 2026 expansion continued this balancing act, adding further Lingayat, Vokkaliga, SC, ST and minority representation; see Cabinet expansion below.

A further political challenge awaiting the ministry was the Karnataka Socio-Economic and Educational Survey (commonly referred to as the state's caste census), a comprehensive survey whose final report was submitted to the government in the final weeks of the Siddaramaiah administration. Leaked portions of the report suggested that the Lingayat and Vokkaliga communities were numerically smaller than widely perceived, with SC/ST, backward class, and OBC communities collectively constituting a large majority of the state's population. Formal acceptance and implementation of the survey's findings had the potential to reshape political representation and reservation policy — a particularly complex inheritance for a Chief Minister whose own community's numerical weight the survey had placed under scrutiny.

=== Early decisions ===
Following the swearing-in ceremony on 3 June 2026, Chief Minister Shivakumar visited the Ajjayya Mutt in Nagarbhavi, Bengaluru — the seat of Veera Gangadhara Ajja, the seer in whose name he had taken his oath — before proceeding to Vidhana Soudha to formally assume charge. The first cabinet meeting was held on the same evening, at which ministers signalled that the five guarantee schemes and other programmes launched by the preceding Siddaramaiah government would be continued alongside new initiatives to be announced in due course.

The decision to retain the Bangalore Development Authority (BDA) and Bangalore Metropolitan Region Development Authority (BMRDA) directly under the Chief Minister, rather than consolidating them with the Greater Bengaluru Development portfolio assigned to Krishna Byre Gowda, drew attention from political observers and real-estate stakeholders as a signal of Shivakumar's intention to retain personal oversight of Bengaluru's land and planning institutions.

== Budgets ==
The 2026–27 state budget, presented on 6 March 2026 by then Chief Minister Siddaramaiah as his seventeenth budget, remained operative at the formation of this ministry. The budget proposed a total outlay of ₹4,48,004 crore — a 13.3 per cent increase over the 2025–26 revised estimates — and set a revenue expenditure target of ₹3,38,007 crore. Capital outlay was fixed at ₹71,924 crore, up 14 per cent over the previous year's revised estimates. The fiscal deficit was pegged at 2.9 per cent of GSDP (₹97,448 crore), against a projected GSDP of ₹33,05,500 crore at current prices. ₹51,286 crore was allocated for the five guarantee schemes. Chief Minister Shivakumar, who assumed the Finance portfolio on taking office, is expected to present the ministry's first budget for the financial year 2027–28 in early 2027.

== Policies and legislation ==
=== Five Guarantees (continuation) ===
The ministry inherited the five welfare guarantee schemes — Gruha Jyoti, Gruha Lakshmi, Anna Bhagya, Shakti, and Yuva Nidhi — launched by the Second Siddaramaiah ministry between June and August 2023. The 2026–27 budget, presented by Siddaramaiah prior to the leadership transition, had already allocated ₹51,286 crore for the continuation of the five schemes. Shivakumar signalled an intent to review the beneficiary lists to weed out ineligible recipients, while affirming that the schemes themselves would be continued.

=== Greater Bengaluru Authority ===
The ministry assumed responsibility for conducting elections to the five new Greater Bengaluru Authority (GBA) city corporations — 2026 Greater Bengaluru Authority elections — and urban local bodies across Karnataka, following the restructuring of the Bruhat Bengaluru Mahanagara Palike (BBMP) under the Greater Bengaluru Governance Act, 2024, enacted by the previous ministry. Krishna Byre Gowda was allocated the Greater Bengaluru Development portfolio, covering the GBA, all five city corporations, BWSSB, and BMRCL, while Chief Minister Shivakumar retained the Bangalore Development Authority (BDA) and the Bangalore Metropolitan Region Development Authority (BMRDA) under his own portfolio. Yathindra Siddaramaiah was assigned Urban Development for the rest of Karnataka's urban local bodies, excluding BDA, BMRDA, GBA, and the Commissionerate of Town and Country Planning.

=== Official status for Tulu ===
At a special Cabinet meeting held in Mangaluru on 18 September 2026 — the first sitting of the Karnataka Cabinet outside Bengaluru under this ministry — the government accorded Tulu the status of second additional official administrative language in Dakshina Kannada and Udupi districts. The decision fulfils a long-standing demand of the Tulu-speaking coastal community, concentrated in those two districts and in the adjoining Kasaragod district of Kerala. Under the Cabinet note, ₹82 lakh is to be allocated annually for translation, training and promotion of Tulu in district-level administration.

At the same Mangaluru sitting, the Cabinet approved the Karnataka Marine Biotechnology Policy 2026–31, deciding to upgrade the existing Mangaluru fisheries college into a Fisheries, Marine and Blue Economy University with intake rising from 60 to 200 seats. The Cabinet also decided to issue a draft notification inviting public opinions and objections for one month on the proposed renaming of Dakshina Kannada district as Mangaluru — a demand that had gained renewed momentum following the earlier renaming of Ramanagara district as Bengaluru South. A final decision on the renaming will follow after the consultation period.

== Opposition response ==
The BJP's Leader of the Opposition in the Karnataka Legislative Assembly, R. Ashoka, dismissed the leadership transition as a "change of driver," arguing that replacing Siddaramaiah with Shivakumar brought no meaningful change to a government that had, in his assessment, burdened the state with debt. He alleged that the outgoing government had incurred ₹7.64 lakh crore in debt through three consecutive deficit budgets. Ashoka further criticised the cabinet as constituted at formation for not including any woman minister. The criticism was echoed within the Congress itself: senior party leader and former Union Minister Margaret Alva expressed "deep disappointment" at the absence of women in the new Council of Ministers. Chief Minister Shivakumar responded by noting that no women had been inducted in the first round of the previous government's cabinet formation either, that several vacancies remained to be filled, and indicated that future expansions would address the concern. The criticism resurfaced after the 3 August 2026 expansion: the one woman on the cleared list of 20, MLC Gayathri Shanthegowda, was not among the 19 sworn in, leaving the ministry without any woman minister. Shanthegowda was administered her MLC oath on 7 August 2026, removing the procedural obstacle to her induction, but as of 22 September 2026 — more than six weeks later — she had still not been sworn in as a minister, leaving the ministry without any woman minister nearly four months into its term.

JD(S) chief and Union Minister H. D. Kumaraswamy congratulated Shivakumar following the swearing-in ceremony, expressing hope that the new Chief Minister would pursue people-centric initiatives and contribute to Karnataka's development and progress. The congratulatory message was notable given the longstanding political rivalry between the two Vokkaliga leaders, marked by sharp exchanges during Shivakumar's tenure as Deputy Chief Minister. Karnataka BJP president B. Y. Vijayendra also offered congratulations, stating that he hoped the new government would prioritise the welfare of Karnataka's land, water resources, and Kannada language.

== Controversies ==
=== Portfolio row and Ramalinga Reddy's resignation ===
On 5 June 2026, Cabinet Minister Ramalinga Reddy submitted his resignation to Chief Minister Shivakumar, citing dissatisfaction with the portfolio allocated to him. Reddy, who represents the BTM Layout constituency and had previously served as Transport Minister in the Second Siddaramaiah ministry, had sought the Greater Bengaluru Development portfolio and claimed it had been informally promised to him. Addressing a press conference in Bengaluru, Reddy stated that he could not act against his conscience and preferred to continue only as an MLA rather than accept a portfolio he considered inconsistent with the commitment made to him. He clarified that he had not resigned from the Congress party, with which he had been associated for over 53 years.

The resignation marked the new government's first major political challenge, coming within days of taking office and ahead of a scheduled visit to Bengaluru by senior Congress leader Rahul Gandhi. Following talks between Reddy and the Congress high command, the resignation was rejected on 6 June 2026, and Reddy confirmed to reporters that he would continue in the ministry, with the question of a portfolio change left open for the leadership to decide. Shivakumar stated the same day that the matter had been settled. Reddy was allocated the Water Resources portfolio at that time; on 12 August 2026, alongside the wider portfolio allocation for the expanded cabinet, he was moved to Forest, Ecology and Environment (see Cabinet Reshuffles).

=== B. Nagendra and the Valmiki Corporation case ===
The circumstances surrounding Cabinet Minister B. Nagendra's re-induction on 3 August 2026 constituted one of the most sustained political crises of the ministry's early months, culminating in his resignation on 28 August 2026 — just 26 days after he had taken the ministerial oath.

The underlying controversy dated to May 2024, when P. Chandrasekharan, accounts superintendent of the Karnataka Maharshi Valmiki Scheduled Tribes Development Corporation Limited (KMVSTDCL), died by suicide in Shivamogga district, leaving behind a note alleging the unauthorised transfer of approximately ₹187 crore in corporation funds. The Central Bureau of Investigation registered a case on 3 June 2024 following a complaint by the Deputy General Manager of Union Bank of India, alleging cheating, forgery and criminal misappropriation involving illegal transfers and withdrawals of approximately ₹84.63 crore from KMVSTDCL's account at the bank's MG Road branch in Bengaluru between February and May 2024. Nagendra, then Scheduled Tribes Welfare Minister and chairman of the KMVSTDCL, resigned under pressure on 6 June 2024. On 12 July 2024, the Enforcement Directorate arrested him under the Prevention of Money Laundering Act following raids at 20 locations across Karnataka, Andhra Pradesh and Telangana; he spent approximately three months in judicial custody before being granted bail by a Bengaluru court in October 2024. The CBI subsequently filed multiple chargesheets; a detailed chargesheet filed in June 2026 named 30 accused, including Nagendra, his close associates Nekkanti Nagaraj and Padmanabha J. G. (then Corporation chief), and a Hyderabad-based operative alleged to have fabricated forged rubber seals and stamps to execute fraudulent banking transactions, with the diverted funds allegedly layered through approximately 600 bank accounts and converted into cash, bullion and luxury vehicles.

Nagendra's re-induction into the Cabinet on 3 August 2026 — with the CBI chargesheet and ED proceedings both pending — immediately became a political flashpoint. The opposition BJP and JD(S) disrupted the Karnataka Legislative Assembly's Monsoon Session (which opened on 13 August 2026) for at least five consecutive days demanding his removal, preventing the government from transacting legislative business. By late August, the CBI had separately approached Governor Thawarchand Gehlot seeking sanction to prosecute Nagendra; the Governor granted the sanction — a development Nagendra himself confirmed at his resignation press conference while questioning the manner in which it had been obtained.

Nagendra announced his resignation at a press conference at Vidhana Soudha on the evening of 28 August 2026, accompanied by Congress Rajya Sabha MP Nasser Hussain and Cabinet Ministers Rizwan Arshad and Ajay Singh. He said he had chosen to resign voluntarily so as not to cause the party political embarrassment, while noting that Chief Minister Shivakumar had asked him not to do so. Breaking down during the press conference, he maintained he had no involvement in the alleged diversion of funds and alleged that he was being targeted as a Dalit leader by those who opposed the elevation of people from oppressed sections of society. All proceedings against Nagendra remain pending before the courts; he has consistently denied the allegations.

=== MLA resignations and dissent following the cabinet expansion ===
The finalisation of the 20-member list triggered dissent within the Congress that continued past the swearing-in itself. Congress MLAs Yashavantarayagouda V. Patil (Indi) and Belur Gopalakrishna (Sagar) resigned from the Karnataka Legislative Assembly hours before the ceremony, alleging that assurances of a ministerial berth had been broken; Patil submitted his resignation to Deputy Speaker Rudrappa Lamani at Vidhana Soudha, where his supporters staged a protest, while Gopalakrishna said "only children of former Chief Ministers get prominence in the Congress." The resignations require formal verification and acceptance before the seats are declared vacant.

Dissent widened over the following day. Senior MLA Dinesh Gundu Rao — a six-time legislator, former Health Minister under Siddaramaiah, and a prominent Brahmin face of the party who was left out of the expansion — publicly voiced disappointment on social media, while MLAs T. B. Jayachandra and B. K. Sangameshwara were reported to be considering resignation in solidarity with the excluded aspirants. Other senior leaders excluded from the expansion included H. K. Patil, Lakshmi Hebbalkar, Shivanand Patil, R. B. Timmapur, R. V. Deshpande, K. Venkatesh, H. C. Mahadevappa, and Tanveer Sait; several accounts frame the exclusions of Mahadevappa, Venkatesh and Sait — all closely associated with former Chief Minister Siddaramaiah — as intended to avoid duplicating representation with Siddaramaiah's son Yathindra Siddaramaiah, already a minister from the Mysuru region. Congress leaders indicated that further disgruntlement was likely to be managed through appointments to state boards and corporations rather than additional cabinet berths, given no seats remained beyond the one held open for Shanthegowda.

Karnataka Home Minister Priyank Kharge defended the selection process, noting that with more than 140 Congress MLAs across every district and community, only a fraction could be accommodated in the 34-seat ministry. The Chief Minister's Office pointed to six ministers drawn from Backward Class communities, alongside deputies from those communities in the Assembly and Council, as evidence the expansion had continued the ministry's broader caste-balancing effort; observers noted the Congress high command had dropped more than a dozen ministers from the Second Siddaramaiah ministry in the process.

== Legal proceedings ==
This section summarises criminal and civil proceedings involving members of the council of ministers, sourced from election affidavits filed before the Election Commission of India, judicial records, and news reports. Unless otherwise noted, all matters listed are either pending, closed without conviction, or relate to charges that have been dismissed. All individuals are presumed innocent unless convicted by a competent court.

=== D. K. Shivakumar ===
Shivakumar is among the most extensively litigated political figures in Karnataka. In August 2017, Income Tax authorities raided properties linked to him in New Delhi and Bengaluru, seizing approximately ₹8.59 crore in unaccounted cash from his Safdarjung Enclave apartment. The IT Department filed a chargesheet before a special court in Bengaluru alleging tax evasion and hawala transactions, claiming Shivakumar had set up an extensive network to transport unaccounted cash across Delhi and Bengaluru. Based on the IT chargesheet, the Enforcement Directorate (ED) registered a Prevention of Money Laundering Act (PMLA) case in September 2018. Shivakumar was arrested by the ED on 3 September 2019 and spent fifty days in ED and judicial custody at Tihar Jail before the Delhi High Court ordered his release on bail on 23 October 2019. The ED filed a prosecution complaint (chargesheet) in 2022. In 2021, the Central Bureau of Investigation (CBI) separately registered a case of disproportionate assets against Shivakumar for the period 2013 to 2018, when he was a Cabinet Minister. The state government had granted consent to the CBI for this probe in 2019, but the Congress government withdrew that consent in November 2023. The Karnataka High Court in August 2024 held that the dispute over the withdrawal of consent was between the State and the Centre, and directed the CBI to approach the Supreme Court of India. Shivakumar was also summoned by the ED in connection with the National Herald money laundering investigation. All matters were pending as of the formation of the ministry, and Shivakumar has consistently denied the allegations, characterising the cases as politically motivated.

=== G. Parameshwara ===
Per his affidavit filed before the Election Commission of India for the 2023 Karnataka Assembly elections, Parameshwara declared three pending criminal cases, primarily related to unlawful assembly charges arising from political protests.

=== K. H. Muniyappa ===
Per his 2023 election affidavit, Muniyappa declared one pending criminal case.

=== K. J. George ===
George was implicated in one of Karnataka's most high-profile political-legal controversies. In July 2016, Deputy Superintendent of Police M. K. Ganapathi died by suicide at Vinayaka Lodge, Madikeri, hours after giving a television interview accusing then-Home Minister George and IPS officers A. M. Prasad and Pranab Mohanty of harassment. George was booked under Section 306 of the Indian Penal Code (abetment of suicide) and resigned as Home Minister. The CID, tasked with the initial investigation, filed a B report (closure report) citing lack of evidence, and George was reinstated with a different portfolio. On a petition by Ganapathi's family, the Supreme Court of India in 2017 ordered a CBI probe, and the CBI registered a fresh FIR against George and the two IPS officers. The CBI submitted its own B report in 2021, also giving all three a clean chit. A one-man judicial inquiry commission (Justice K. N. Keshavanarayana) similarly exonerated George. In September 2025, the Karnataka Cabinet rejected the commission's residual recommendations for administrative action against certain officials, accepting the CBI's closure as conclusive. The case was thus closed at the investigative level prior to Shivakumar's ministry taking office, with no conviction recorded against George.

=== M. B. Patil ===
Per his 2023 election affidavit, Patil declared five pending criminal cases.

=== Satish Jarkiholi ===
Per his 2023 election affidavit, Jarkiholi declared two criminal cases, both under IPC Sections 141, 143, 149, 290 and 336, relating to unlawful assembly, public nuisance, and acts endangering personal safety — charges typically arising from agitational politics. In November 2022, Jarkiholi made public remarks at a gathering in Belagavi in which he stated that the word "Hindu" was of Persian origin and carried a derogatory connotation, drawing sharp criticism from the BJP and prompting his own party to distance itself from the comments. A private criminal complaint was subsequently filed, and in early 2024 a special court for elected representatives in Bengaluru ordered the registration of a case against him under IPC Sections 153 and 500, relating to promoting enmity between religious groups and defamation. The Karnataka High Court quashed this case in December 2024, with Justice M. Nagaprasanna allowing Jarkiholi's petition against the proceedings. The matter was therefore concluded well before the ministry's formation.

=== Krishna Byre Gowda ===
Per his 2023 election affidavit, Gowda declared one pending criminal case.

=== Priyank Kharge ===
Per his 2023 election affidavit, Kharge declared nine pending criminal cases — the highest count among the Shivakumar ministry's cabinet ministers at formation. The most significant cluster arose from the KPCC's Mekedatu padayatra in January 2022, in which Congress leaders including Shivakumar (then KPCC president) and Kharge conducted a march without requisite permission, resulting in cases under the Karnataka Epidemic Diseases Act, 2020 and the IPC. The Karnataka High Court in September 2023 quashed the padayatra-related charges, holding that the statutory provisions were inapplicable to the conduct alleged. In December 2025, the Supreme Court issued notice to Kharge on a petition by an unsuccessful candidate in the 2023 Karnataka elections, alleging that pamphlets styled as "Congress Guarantees" circulated during the campaign amounted to corrupt practices under the Representation of the People Act, 1951.

=== U. T. Khader ===
No criminal cases were declared in Khader's most recent election affidavit filed before the Election Commission.

=== Eshwara Khandre ===
Per his 2023 election affidavit, Khandre declared seven pending criminal cases.

=== Yathindra Siddaramaiah ===
Yathindra Siddaramaiah has not been named as an accused in any criminal case in his own right. However, in the context of the MUDA (Mysuru Urban Development Authority) site allotment case, the ED probe named him as a MUDA board member during the period when alleged irregular allotments were made to his mother, B. M. Parvathi. His father, former Chief Minister Siddaramaiah, was named as the first accused in an FIR registered by the Lokayukta Police in Mysuru in September 2024, with Parvathi as the second accused. Yathindra was not named as an accused in that FIR. The ED separately registered a PMLA case and issued summons to Parvathi and Cabinet Minister Byrathi Suresh in connection with the same matter. The Karnataka High Court quashed these summons in March 2025, holding that there was no predicate offence under the Prevention of Money Laundering Act given that Parvathi had surrendered the sites in question. The Supreme Court, in a bench led by Chief Justice B. R. Gavai, dismissed the ED's Special Leave Petitions against this order on 21 July 2025, cautioning the agency against being used for political ends and finding no grounds to interfere with the High Court's ruling. The PMLA proceedings against Parvathi and Byrathi Suresh were thus concluded prior to the formation of this ministry, though the underlying Lokayukta investigation against Siddaramaiah remained separately ongoing.

=== Byrathi Suresh ===
No criminal cases were declared in Suresh's most recent election affidavit filed before the Election Commission. He was separately named in ED summons connected to the MUDA case (see Yathindra Siddaramaiah above), which were quashed by the Karnataka High Court in March 2025 and upheld by the Supreme Court in July 2025.

=== Sharan Prakash Patil ===
No criminal cases were declared in Patil's most recent election affidavit filed before the Election Commission.

=== Ramalinga Reddy ===
Per his 2023 election affidavit, Reddy declared no pending criminal cases.

=== B. Nagendra ===
See Controversies above for the full account of the CBI and ED proceedings connected to the Karnataka Maharshi Valmiki Scheduled Tribes Development Corporation matter, the Governor's grant of prosecution sanction, and Nagendra's resignation on 28 August 2026. Nagendra has also faced earlier allegations in illegal mining cases in Ballari district. All proceedings remain pending before the courts; Nagendra has consistently denied the allegations.

== Council of Ministers ==
Portfolio allocations reflect the Governor's notification of 12 August 2026, as amended on 18 August 2026 (see Cabinet Reshuffles for the sequence of all allocations). The Planning and Statistics portfolio held by B. Nagendra prior to his resignation on 28 August 2026 has not been reallocated as of this revision. Sources:

Sr. No.	Name	Portrait	MLA/MLC	Constituency	Designation	Portfolio(s)	Party	Term of Office		
Sr. No.	Name	Portrait	MLA/MLC	Constituency	Designation	Portfolio(s)	Party	Took Office	Left Office	Duration
Chief Minister
1	D. K. Shivakumar		MLA	Kanakapura	Chief Minister	Finance; Cabinet Affairs; Dept. of Personnel and Administrative Reforms; Intelligence; Information, Law, Justice and Human Rights; Agriculture Marketing; Commissionerate of Town & Country Planning; All Urban Local Bodies falling under Bengaluru Development Authority (BDA) and Bengaluru Metropolitan Region Development Authority (BMRDA) areas; All unallocated portfolios	INC	3 June 2026	Incumbent	150 days
Deputy Chief Minister
2	G. Parameshwara		MLA	Koratagere	Deputy Chief Minister	Revenue; Sports	INC	3 June 2026	Incumbent	150 days
Cabinet Ministers
3	K. H. Muniyappa		MLA	Devanahalli	Cabinet Minister	Social Welfare	INC	3 June 2026	Incumbent	150 days
4	K. J. George		MLA	Sarvagnanagar	Cabinet Minister	Energy; Tourism	INC	3 June 2026	Incumbent	150 days
5	M. B. Patil		MLA	Babaleshwar	Cabinet Minister	Large & Medium Industries; Infrastructure Development (Note: ANI's 12 August 2026 portfolio-allocation post lists Patil's department as "Commerce and Industries," while The News Minute's report on the same notification does not list him among the four ministers whose portfolios changed that day, implying continuity with his existing Large & Medium Industries and Infrastructure Development portfolio. This may reflect an informal renaming of the same department rather than a substantive change; the discrepancy between sources is noted here rather than resolved. Confirm against the Governor's written notification once available.)	INC	3 June 2026	Incumbent	150 days
6	Satish Jarkiholi		MLA	Yemkanmardi	Cabinet Minister	Public Works	INC	3 June 2026	Incumbent	150 days
7	Krishna Byre Gowda		MLA	Byatarayanapura	Cabinet Minister	Greater Bengaluru Development (Note: (including Greater Bengaluru Authority — GBA, Bengaluru North City Corporation — BNCC, Bengaluru South City Corporation — BSCC, Bengaluru East City Corporation — BECC, Bengaluru West City Corporation — BWCC, Bengaluru Central City Corporation — BCCC, Bengaluru Water Supply & Sewerage Board — BWSSB, Bengaluru Metro Rail Corporation Limited — BMRCL)); Parliamentary Affairs and Legislation	INC	3 June 2026	Incumbent	150 days
8	Priyank Kharge		MLA	Chittapur	Cabinet Minister	Home (excluding Intelligence); Information Technology & Biotechnology; E-Governance	INC	3 June 2026	Incumbent	150 days
9	U. T. Khader		MLA	Mangalore	Cabinet Minister	Health & Family Welfare; Minority Welfare; Haj and Wakf	INC	3 June 2026	Incumbent	150 days
10	Eshwara Khandre		MLA	Bhalki	Cabinet Minister	Rural Development; Panchayati Raj	INC	3 June 2026	Incumbent	150 days
11	Yathindra Siddaramaiah		MLC	Legislative Assembly	Cabinet Minister	Urban Development (Note: (including Karnataka Urban Water Supply and Drainage Board — KUWSDB, Karnataka Urban Infrastructure Development and Finance Corporation — KUIDFC, all Urban Development Authorities and Local Planning Authorities; excluding BDA, BMRDA, GBA, Commissionerate of Town & Country Planning))	INC	3 June 2026	Incumbent	150 days
12	Byrathi Suresh		MLA	Hebbal	Cabinet Minister	Transport	INC	3 June 2026	Incumbent	150 days
13	Sharan Prakash Patil		MLA	Sedam	Cabinet Minister	Medical Education; Skill Development	INC	3 June 2026	Incumbent	150 days
14	Ramalinga Reddy		MLA	B.T.M Layout	Cabinet Minister	Forest, Ecology and Environment	INC	3 June 2026	Incumbent	150 days (Note: Reddy tendered his resignation on 5 June 2026, citing dissatisfaction with the portfolio allocated to him; the Congress high command rejected the resignation on 6 June 2026 and he continued in office without a break in tenure (see Controversies). He initially held Water Resources, and was reassigned Forest, Ecology and Environment in the 12 August 2026 portfolio allocation.)
15	B. Z. Zameer Ahmed Khan		MLA	Chamrajpet	Cabinet Minister	Housing	INC	3 August 2026	Incumbent	89 days
16	Santosh Lad		MLA	Kalghatgi	Cabinet Minister	Labour and Employment	INC	3 August 2026	Incumbent	89 days
17	Rizwan Arshad		MLA	Shivajinagar	Cabinet Minister	Food and Civil Supplies; Consumer Affairs	INC	3 August 2026	Incumbent	89 days
18	Madhu Bangarappa	(to the left)	MLA	Soraba	Cabinet Minister	Primary and Secondary Education	INC	3 August 2026	Incumbent	89 days
19	S. S. Mallikarjun		MLA	Davanagere North	Cabinet Minister	Mines and Geology; Horticulture	INC	3 August 2026	Incumbent	89 days (Note: The Congress high command's initial list, released on the morning of 3 August 2026, had named Mankal S. Vaidya (Bhatkal); the party subsequently dropped Vaidya at the last minute to accommodate Mallikarjun, reportedly to address the cabinet's Lingayat representation. Vaidya, a minister in the Second Siddaramaiah ministry, was not part of the final list sworn in.)
20	K. S. Basavanthappa		MLA	Mayakonda	Cabinet Minister	Muzrai; Fisheries, Ports and Inland Water	INC	3 August 2026	Incumbent	89 days
21	Laxman Savadi		MLA	Athani	Cabinet Minister	Co-operation excluding Agriculture Marketing	INC	3 August 2026	Incumbent	89 days
22	Vijayanand Kashappanavar		MLA	Hungund	Cabinet Minister	Small Scale Industries; Public Enterprises	INC	3 August 2026	Incumbent	89 days
23	Basavaraj Rayareddy		MLA	Yelburga	Cabinet Minister	Higher Education	INC	3 August 2026	Incumbent	89 days
24	H. C. Balakrishna		MLA	Magadi	Cabinet Minister	Municipal Administration	INC	3 August 2026	Incumbent	89 days
25	K. M. Shivalinge Gowda		MLA	Arsikere	Cabinet Minister	Excise from Finance Department	INC	3 August 2026	Incumbent	89 days
26	N. Chaluvaraya Swamy		MLA	Nagamangala	Cabinet Minister	Major and Medium Irrigation	INC	3 August 2026	Incumbent	89 days
27	Ajay Singh		MLA	Jevargi	Cabinet Minister	Minor Irrigation; Science and Technology	INC	3 August 2026	Incumbent	89 days
28	P. M. Narendraswamy		MLA	Malavalli	Cabinet Minister	Agriculture	INC	3 August 2026	Incumbent	89 days
29	Shivaraj Tangadagi		MLA	Kanakagiri	Cabinet Minister	Backward Classes Welfare; Kannada and Culture	INC	3 August 2026	Incumbent	89 days
30	Rudrappa Lamani		MLA	Haveri	Cabinet Minister	Sugar and Textiles	INC	3 August 2026	Incumbent	89 days (Note: Lamani had served as Deputy Speaker of the Karnataka Legislative Assembly since July 2023, and presided over sittings of the Assembly during the vacancy in the Speakership that followed U. T. Khader's June 2026 resignation. He vacated the Deputy Speakership upon his own induction into the Cabinet on 3 August 2026 and was succeeded in that post by Mankala Vaidya, elected on 18 August 2026.)
31	T. Raghumurthy		MLA	Challakere	Cabinet Minister	Scheduled Tribe (ST) Welfare	INC	3 August 2026	Incumbent	89 days
32	C. Puttarangashetty		MLA	Chamarajanagar	Cabinet Minister	Animal Husbandry and Sericulture	INC	3 August 2026	Incumbent	89 days

Vacancies (2): Gayathri Shanthegowda (MLC, Chikkamagaluru Local Authorities' Constituency), cleared by the Congress high command for the August expansion, was administered the oath as a Member of the Karnataka Legislative Council on 7 August 2026 — removing the procedural obstacle to her ministerial induction — but had not been sworn in as a minister as of 22 September 2026, more than six weeks later. B. Nagendra (Bellary Rural) resigned on 28 August 2026 (see Former Ministers). The ministry stands at 32 members, two short of Karnataka's sanctioned strength of 34.

== Legislative posts ==
Alongside the 3 August 2026 cabinet expansion, the Congress high command approved appointments to key legislative posts, filling vacancies that had persisted since U. T. Khader's resignation as Speaker in June 2026:

- Gurupadagouda Patil was elected Speaker of the Karnataka Legislative Assembly on 14 August 2026, filling the vacancy that had remained since U. T. Khader's resignation in June 2026. During the interim, Deputy Speaker Rudrappa Lamani had been presiding over the sittings.
- Mankala Vaidya was elected Deputy Speaker of the Karnataka Legislative Assembly on 18 August 2026, succeeding Rudrappa Lamani (who vacated the post to join the Cabinet on 3 August 2026). An earlier announcement had named A. S. Ponnanna to the post, but his name was subsequently dropped and Vaidya — who had been denied a cabinet position — was proposed and elected unopposed.
- Saleem Ahmed was elected Chairman of the Karnataka Legislative Council on 14 August 2026.
- Umashree was elected Deputy Chairperson of the Karnataka Legislative Council on 18 August 2026.

== Former Ministers ==
#	Name	Portrait	Constituency	Designation	Department	Party	Took Office	Left Office	Duration	Reason
1	B. Nagendra		Bellary Rural	Cabinet Minister	Planning and Statistics	INC	3 August 2026	28 August 2026	26 days	(Note: Resigned citing the political controversy surrounding the pending CBI and ED proceedings connected to the Karnataka Maharshi Valmiki Scheduled Tribes Development Corporation case. The Governor had granted prosecution sanction to the CBI against him shortly before his resignation. Nagendra stated he did not wish to cause embarrassment to the party, while maintaining his innocence and alleging that he was being targeted as a Dalit leader. Chief Minister Shivakumar had asked him not to resign. See Controversies.)

== Cabinet Reshuffles ==
=== 3 August 2026: Cabinet expansion ===
Ministerial aspirants endured a week of suspense before the expansion was finalised, as the Congress high command remained occupied with Gen Z-led protests in Delhi and with Rahul Gandhi's parliamentary engagements even after Chief Minister Shivakumar travelled to New Delhi to secure approval. The high command ultimately cleared a list of 20 names on the morning of 3 August 2026, with the final list undergoing a last-minute change: Bhatkal MLA and former Fisheries Minister Mankal S. Vaidya, who had featured in the initial list, was dropped to accommodate senior Davanagere North MLA S. S. Mallikarjun, a prominent Lingayat leader from the influential Shamanur family who had reportedly threatened to resign over his initial exclusion. Several senior leaders considered likely for induction — including H. K. Patil, Dinesh Gundu Rao, R. B. Timmapur, Lakshmi Hebbalkar and N. S. Boseraju — were left out of the expansion.

The swearing-in ceremony was held at 4:05 pm at the Glass House of Lok Bhavan, Bengaluru, administered by Governor Thawarchand Gehlot. However, of the 20 names cleared, only 19 were sworn in: MLC Gayathri Shanthegowda, the sole woman on the list, did not participate, as she had not yet herself taken oath as a member of the Karnataka Legislative Council following the Karnataka High Court's 31 July 2026 ruling — issued by Justice S. G. Pandit on an election petition, after a recount of the disputed 2021 Council election from the Chikkamagaluru Local Authorities' Constituency — that set aside BJP MLC M. K. Pranesh's declared victory and instead declared Shanthegowda elected by a nine-vote margin. Shanthegowda was administered the oath as a Member of the Legislative Council on 7 August 2026, with Chief Minister Shivakumar present at the ceremony. Despite the removal of the legal obstacle, her ministerial induction had not taken place as of 22 September 2026 — more than six weeks after her Council oath.

The 19 sworn in were: B. Z. Zameer Ahmed Khan, Santosh Lad, Rizwan Arshad, Madhu Bangarappa, B. Nagendra, S. S. Mallikarjun, K. S. Basavanthappa, Laxman Savadi, Vijayanand Kashappanavar, Basavaraj Rayareddy, H. C. Balakrishna, K. M. Shivalinge Gowda, N. Chaluvaraya Swamy, Ajay Singh, P. M. Narendraswamy, Shivaraj Tangadagi, Rudrappa Lamani, T. Raghumurthy, and C. Puttarangashetty. Of these, B. Nagendra subsequently resigned on 28 August 2026 (see Former Ministers).

Chief Minister Shivakumar and other Congress leaders subsequently highlighted the expanded cabinet's social composition. Muslim representation rose to three Cabinet ministers — U. T. Khader, B. Z. Zameer Ahmed Khan and Rizwan Arshad — alongside Saleem Ahmed's appointment as Chairman of the Karnataka Legislative Council, which observers described as the first time four such positions had simultaneously been held by members of the Muslim community in the state. The expanded 33-member cabinet included no minister from the Brahmin community, reportedly the first time in roughly three decades that a Karnataka government had included no Brahmin minister; the 32-member ministry as constituted after Nagendra's resignation maintains this position.

=== 12 August 2026: portfolio allocation ===
Portfolios were finally allocated by the Governor's office on the evening of 12 August 2026, a day before the Assembly's Monsoon Session opened, following a delay of nearly ten days during which Chief Minister Shivakumar made multiple trips to Delhi and held meetings with disgruntled legislators and ministers pressing for specific departments. This allocation covered the 19 ministers inducted on 3 August 2026, alongside a reshuffle affecting four ministers from the original 14: D. K. Shivakumar, K. H. Muniyappa, U. T. Khader, and Ramalinga Reddy.

Portfolio changes among the original 14 ministers, effective 12 August 2026. Source:
Name	Existing Portfolios	Modified Portfolios
D. K. Shivakumar	Finance; Cabinet Affairs; Dept. of Personnel and Administrative Reforms; Intelligence; BDA; BMRDA; all unallocated portfolios	Finance; Cabinet Affairs; Dept. of Personnel and Administrative Reforms; Intelligence; Information, Law, Justice and Human Rights; Parliamentary Affairs and Legislation; Agriculture Marketing; Commissionerate of Town & Country Planning; all Urban Local Bodies under BDA and BMRDA areas; all unallocated portfolios
Ramalinga Reddy	Water Resources	Forest, Ecology and Environment
K. H. Muniyappa	Food & Civil Supplies and Consumer Affairs	Social Welfare
U. T. Khader	Health & Family Welfare	Minority Welfare, Haj & Wakf, Health & Family Welfare

K. H. Muniyappa's move to Social Welfare followed a personal appeal to the party leadership; press coverage noted that as a member of the Madiga (Dalit Left) community, Muniyappa had specifically sought the department given long-standing competing demands over it between Dalit Left and Dalit Right groups within the party.

=== 18 August 2026 ===
Name	Existing Portfolios	Modified Portfolios
D. K. Shivakumar	Finance; Cabinet Affairs; Dept. of Personnel and Administrative Reforms; Intelligence; Information, Law, Justice and Human Rights; Parliamentary Affairs and Legislation; Agriculture Marketing; Commissionerate of Town & Country Planning; all Urban Local Bodies under BDA and BMRDA areas; all unallocated portfolios	Finance; Cabinet Affairs; Dept. of Personnel and Administrative Reforms; Intelligence; Information, Law, Justice and Human Rights; Legislation; Agriculture Marketing; Commissionerate of Town & Country Planning; all Urban Local Bodies under BDA and BMRDA areas; all unallocated portfolios (Parliamentary Affairs transferred to Krishna Byre Gowda)
Krishna Byre Gowda	Greater Bengaluru Development	Greater Bengaluru Development; Parliamentary Affairs

=== 28 August 2026 ===
Name	Existing Portfolios	Modified Portfolios
B. Nagendra	Planning and Statistics	Resigned; portfolio unallocated as of 22 September 2026

== Demographics of Cabinet Ministers ==
The tables below reflect the ministry as constituted as of 22 September 2026 — 32 active members including the Chief Minister, following B. Nagendra's resignation on 28 August 2026. Precise dates of birth were not available in sources reviewed for all 32 ministers; where only an age (as reported around the time of induction) was available, an approximate birth year is given and marked with "c." (circa). Caste/community and reservation-category information is likewise given only where independently sourced; ministers for whom this could not be confirmed are marked "Not specified in sources reviewed" rather than inferred from surname or constituency alone.

=== By district ===
Representation of cabinet ministers by district (as of 22 September 2026; excluding the sole MLC, Yathindra Siddaramaiah)
1. Bagalkot (3.23%)
2. Belagavi (6.45%)
3. Bengaluru North (3.23%)
4. Bengaluru South (6.45%)
5. Bengaluru Urban (19.4%)
6. Bidar (3.23%)
7. Chamarajanagar (3.23%)
8. Chitradurga (3.23%)
9. Dakshina Kannada (3.23%)
10. Davanagere (6.45%)
11. Dharwad (3.23%)
12. Haveri (3.23%)
13. Hassan (3.23%)
14. Kalaburagi (9.68%)
15. Koppal (6.45%)
16. Mandya (6.45%)
17. Shivamogga (3.23%)
18. Tumakuru (3.23%)
19. Vijayapura (3.23%)

District	Cabinet Ministers	Name of Ministers
Bagalkot	1	Vijayanand Kashappanavar (Hungund)
Belagavi	2	Satish Jarkiholi (Yemkanmardi); Laxman Savadi (Athani)
Bengaluru North	1	K. H. Muniyappa (Devanahalli)
Bengaluru South	2	D. K. Shivakumar (Kanakapura); H. C. Balakrishna (Magadi)
Bengaluru Urban	6	K. J. George (Sarvagnanagar); Krishna Byre Gowda (Byatarayanapura); Byrathi Suresh (Hebbal); Ramalinga Reddy (B.T.M Layout); B. Z. Zameer Ahmed Khan (Chamrajpet); Rizwan Arshad (Shivajinagar)
Bidar	1	Eshwara Khandre (Bhalki)
Chamarajanagar	1	C. Puttarangashetty (Chamarajanagar)
Chitradurga	1	T. Raghumurthy (Challakere)
Dakshina Kannada	1	U. T. Khader (Mangalore)
Davanagere	2	S. S. Mallikarjun (Davanagere North); K. S. Basavanthappa (Mayakonda)
Dharwad	1	Santosh Lad (Kalghatgi)
Haveri	1	Rudrappa Lamani (Haveri)
Hassan	1	K. M. Shivalinge Gowda (Arsikere)
Kalaburagi	3	Priyank Kharge (Chittapur); Sharan Prakash Patil (Sedam); Ajay Singh (Jevargi)
Koppal	2	Shivaraj Tangadagi (Kanakagiri); Basavaraj Rayareddy (Yelburga)
Mandya	2	N. Chaluvaraya Swamy (Nagamangala); P. M. Narendraswamy (Malavalli)
Shivamogga	1	Madhu Bangarappa (Soraba)
Tumakuru	1	G. Parameshwara (Koratagere)
Vijayapura	1	M. B. Patil (Babaleshwar)
MLC (no constituency district)	1	Yathindra Siddaramaiah
Total	32	—N/a

The ministry drew representatives from 19 of Karnataka's 31 districts as of 22 September 2026, following B. Nagendra's resignation which removed the sole representative of Ballari district. (The count of 31 districts, and the district attributions used throughout this article, reflect the state government's 2024 renaming of Ramanagara district as Bengaluru South district and Bengaluru Rural district as Bengaluru North district; both D. K. Shivakumar's Kanakapura constituency and H. C. Balakrishna's Magadi constituency fall within the area formerly known as Ramanagara district and are accordingly both counted under Bengaluru South.) Mysuru district, Ballari district, Uttara Kannada, Kodagu, Chikkamagaluru, Raichur, and Yadgir, among others, are without cabinet representation.

=== By division ===
Karnataka's 31 districts are grouped into four revenue divisions — Bengaluru, Mysuru, Belagavi (also known as Kitturu Karnataka), and Kalaburagi (also known as Kalyana Karnataka) — each headed by a Regional Commissioner.

Representation of cabinet ministers by revenue division (as of 22 September 2026; excluding the sole MLC, Yathindra Siddaramaiah)
1. Bengaluru Division (45.2%)
2. Kalaburagi Division (Kalyana Karnataka) (19.4%)
3. Belagavi Division (Kitturu Karnataka) (19.4%)
4. Mysuru Division (16.1%)

Division	Cabinet Ministers	Name of Ministers (Constituency)
Bengaluru Division	14	D. K. Shivakumar (Kanakapura); G. Parameshwara (Koratagere); K. H. Muniyappa (Devanahalli); K. J. George (Sarvagnanagar); Krishna Byre Gowda (Byatarayanapura); Byrathi Suresh (Hebbal); Ramalinga Reddy (B.T.M Layout); B. Z. Zameer Ahmed Khan (Chamrajpet); Rizwan Arshad (Shivajinagar); Madhu Bangarappa (Soraba); S. S. Mallikarjun (Davanagere North); K. S. Basavanthappa (Mayakonda); H. C. Balakrishna (Magadi); T. Raghumurthy (Challakere)
Kalaburagi Division (Kalyana Karnataka)	6	Priyank Kharge (Chittapur); Eshwara Khandre (Bhalki); Sharan Prakash Patil (Sedam); Basavaraj Rayareddy (Yelburga); Ajay Singh (Jevargi); Shivaraj Tangadagi (Kanakagiri)
Belagavi Division (Kitturu Karnataka)	6	M. B. Patil (Babaleshwar); Satish Jarkiholi (Yemkanmardi); Santosh Lad (Kalghatgi); Laxman Savadi (Athani); Vijayanand Kashappanavar (Hungund); Rudrappa Lamani (Haveri)
Mysuru Division	5	U. T. Khader (Mangalore); K. M. Shivalinge Gowda (Arsikere); N. Chaluvaraya Swamy (Nagamangala); P. M. Narendraswamy (Malavalli); C. Puttarangashetty (Chamarajanagar)
N/A (MLC, no constituency division)	1	Yathindra Siddaramaiah
Total	32	—N/a

Bengaluru Division accounts for the largest single share of the ministry. Kalaburagi Division (Kalyana Karnataka) and Belagavi Division (Kitturu Karnataka) are now equal at six ministers each following Nagendra's resignation, which removed one of Kalaburagi Division's seven seats. Mysuru district — home to former Chief Minister Siddaramaiah's Varuna constituency — remains without cabinet representation.

=== By category ===
Representation of cabinet ministers by reservation category (as of 22 September 2026)
1. OBC (68.8%)
2. SC (21.9%)
3. ST (6.25%)
4. General (3.12%)

Category (India)	Category (Karnataka)	Count	Ministers
OBC	Category 1 (Most Backward Classes — No Creamy Layer)	1	C. Puttarangashetty (Uppara)
OBC	Category 2A (Most Backward Classes)	4	Yathindra Siddaramaiah (Halu Kuruba); Byrathi Suresh (Halu Kuruba); Madhu Bangarappa (Deevaru Ediga); Ajay Singh (Surajvanshi Rajput)
OBC	Category 2B (Most Backward Classes: Religious Minorities — Muslims)	3	U. T. Khader (Beary Muslim); B. Z. Zameer Ahmed Khan (Deccani Muslim); Rizwan Arshad (Deccani Muslim)
OBC	Category 3A (Backward Classes)	6	D. K. Shivakumar (Gangadikar Vokkaliga); Krishna Byre Gowda (Gangadikar Vokkaliga); N. Chaluvaraya Swamy (Gangadikar Vokkaliga); H. C. Balakrishna (Gangadikar Vokkaliga); K. M. Shivalinge Gowda (Gangadikar Vokkaliga); Ramalinga Reddy (Pakanati Reddy)
OBC	Category 3B (Backward Classes)	8	M. B. Patil (Kudu Vokkaliga Veerashaiva-Lingayat); Eshwara Khandre (Dikshavant Lingayat); Sharan Prakash Patil (Adi Banajiga Lingayat); S. S. Mallikarjun (Banajiga Lingayat); Laxman Savadi (Ganiga Lingayat); Vijayanand Kashappanavar (Panchamasali Lingayat); Basavaraj Rayareddy (Reddy Lingayat); Santosh Lad (Kshatriya Maratha)
SC	SC Left (Group A)	2	K. H. Muniyappa (Madiga); K. S. Basavanthappa (Madiga)
SC	SC Right (Group B)	3	G. Parameshwara (Adi Dravida); Priyank Kharge (Holeya); P. M. Narendraswamy (Holeya)
SC	SC Touchables / Other SCs (Group C)	2	Shivaraj Tangadagi (Bhovi); Rudrappa Lamani (Banjara)
ST	ST Category	2	Satish Jarkiholi (Valmiki Nayaka); T. Raghumurthy (Valmiki Nayaka)
General	General	1	K. J. George (Syro-Malabar Catholic)
Total		32	—N/a

Following B. Nagendra's resignation on 28 August 2026, Scheduled Tribe representation dropped from three to two ministers (6.25% of the ministry), both from the Valmiki Nayaka sub-group. OBC representation, at 22 ministers (68.75%), remains the ministry's largest bloc. The ministry has no Brahmin minister — reportedly the first time in roughly three decades that a Karnataka government has had none.

=== By community ===
Representation of cabinet ministers by caste/community (as of 22 September 2026)
1. Lingayat (21.9%)
2. Scheduled Caste (21.9%)
3. Vokkaliga (15.6%)
4. Muslim (9.38%)
5. Kuruba (6.25%)
6. Scheduled Tribe (Valmiki Nayaka) (6.25%)
7. Christian (3.12%)
8. Idiga (3.12%)
9. Rajput (3.12%)
10. Uppara (3.12%)
11. Maratha (3.12%)
12. Reddy (3.12%)

Community	Count	Share	Notes
Lingayat	7	21.9%	Largest single community (tied with SC); includes M. B. Patil (Kudu Vokkaliga Veerashaiva-Lingayat), counted here rather than under Vokkaliga per his dual-labelled affidavit entry
Scheduled Caste (combined)	7	21.9%	Spans Madiga, Adi Dravida, Holeya, Bhovi and Banjara sub-groups; see By category above for the SC Left/Right/Touchables breakdown
Vokkaliga	5	15.6%	All Gangadikar Vokkaliga, including Chief Minister D. K. Shivakumar
Muslim	3	9.4%	U. T. Khader (Beary), B. Z. Zameer Ahmed Khan and Rizwan Arshad (both Deccani)
Kuruba	2	6.3%	Yathindra Siddaramaiah and Byrathi Suresh (both Halu Kuruba)
Scheduled Tribe	2	6.3%	Both Valmiki Nayaka: Satish Jarkiholi and T. Raghumurthy; B. Nagendra (also Valmiki Nayaka) resigned 28 August 2026
Christian	1	3.1%	K. J. George (Syro-Malabar Catholic)
Idiga	1	3.1%	Madhu Bangarappa (Deevaru Ediga)
Rajput	1	3.1%	Ajay Singh (Surajvanshi)
Uppara	1	3.1%	C. Puttarangashetty
Maratha	1	3.1%	Santosh Lad (Kshatriya Maratha)
Reddy	1	3.1%	Ramalinga Reddy (Pakanati)
Total	32	—N/a	—N/a

Lingayats and Scheduled Castes are tied as the ministry's largest blocs at seven each (21.9%), ahead of Vokkaligas at five (15.6%). Scheduled Tribe representation stands at two ministers following Nagendra's resignation, down from three at the time of the August expansion.

=== By constituency type ===
Representation of cabinet ministers by constituency type (as of 22 September 2026; editorial classification, see note — excluding the sole MLC)
1. Rural (67.7%)
2. Urban (25.8%)
3. Part-urban (district/taluk HQ + rural hinterland) (6.45%)

Type	Cabinet Ministers	Name of Ministers (Constituency)
Urban (Municipal/City Corporation seat)	8	K. J. George (Sarvagnanagar, Bengaluru North City Corporation); Krishna Byre Gowda (Byatarayanapura, Bengaluru North City Corporation); U. T. Khader (Mangalore, Mangaluru City Corporation); Byrathi Suresh (Hebbal, Bengaluru North City Corporation); Ramalinga Reddy (B.T.M Layout, Bengaluru South City Corporation); B. Z. Zameer Ahmed Khan (Chamrajpet, Bengaluru Central City Corporation); Rizwan Arshad (Shivajinagar, Bengaluru Central City Corporation); S. S. Mallikarjun (Davanagere North, Davanagere City Corporation)
Part-urban (district/taluk headquarters town plus rural hinterland)	2	Rudrappa Lamani (Haveri — district headquarters town and surrounding taluk); C. Puttarangashetty (Chamarajanagar — district headquarters town and surrounding taluk)
Rural (taluk/village-majority seat)	21	D. K. Shivakumar (Kanakapura); G. Parameshwara (Koratagere); K. H. Muniyappa (Devanahalli); M. B. Patil (Babaleshwar); Satish Jarkiholi (Yemkanmardi); Priyank Kharge (Chittapur); Eshwara Khandre (Bhalki); Sharan Prakash Patil (Sedam); Santosh Lad (Kalghatgi); Madhu Bangarappa (Soraba); K. S. Basavanthappa (Mayakonda); Laxman Savadi (Athani); Vijayanand Kashappanavar (Hungund); Basavaraj Rayareddy (Yelburga); H. C. Balakrishna (Magadi); K. M. Shivalinge Gowda (Arsikere); N. Chaluvaraya Swamy (Nagamangala); Ajay Singh (Jevargi); P. M. Narendraswamy (Malavalli); Shivaraj Tangadagi (Kanakagiri); T. Raghumurthy (Challakere)
N/A (MLC, no constituency)	1	Yathindra Siddaramaiah

=== By religion ===
Representation of cabinet ministers by religion (as of 22 September 2026)
1. Hindu (81.2%)
2. Islam (9.38%)
3. Buddhism (6.25%)
4. Christian (3.12%)

Three ministers are Muslim — U. T. Khader, B. Z. Zameer Ahmed Khan, and Rizwan Arshad — one, K. J. George, is Christian, and two — Deputy Chief Minister G. Parameshwara and Priyank Kharge — are practising Buddhists; the remainder are Hindu.

=== By gender ===
Representation of cabinet ministers by gender (as of 22 September 2026)
1. Male (100.0%)

The ministry remained entirely male as of 22 September 2026. MLC Gayathri Shanthegowda, the only woman named in the August expansion, took her Council oath on 7 August 2026 but had not been sworn in as a minister as of this revision; the B. Nagendra vacancy created on 28 August 2026 adds a second open seat. Should either vacancy be filled by a woman, this section should be updated accordingly.

=== By generation ===
Representation of cabinet ministers by generational cohort (as of 22 September 2026)
1. Baby Boomer (1946–1964) (53.1%)
2. Gen X (1965–1980) (46.9%)

Generation	Count	Ministers
Baby Boomer (1946–1964)	17	K. H. Muniyappa (b. 1948); K. J. George (b. 1949); G. Parameshwara (b. 1951); Ramalinga Reddy (b. 1953); C. Puttarangashetty (b. c. 1954); Basavaraj Rayareddy (b. 1956); K. M. Shivalinge Gowda (b. 1958); Rudrappa Lamani (b. 1959); Laxman Savadi (b. c. 1960); N. Chaluvaraya Swamy (b. 1960); Eshwara Khandre (b. 1962); D. K. Shivakumar (b. 1962); Satish Jarkiholi (b. 1962); P. M. Narendraswamy (b. 1963); T. Raghumurthy (b. 1963); M. B. Patil (b. 1964); H. C. Balakrishna (b. 1965)
Gen X (1965–1980)	15	B. Z. Zameer Ahmed Khan (b. 1966); S. S. Mallikarjun (b. 1967); Sharan Prakash Patil (b. 1967); K. S. Basavanthappa (b. c. 1970); U. T. Khader (b. 1969); Shivaraj Tangadagi (b. 1971); Byrathi Suresh (b. 1972); Vijayanand Kashappanavar (b. 1972); Krishna Byre Gowda (b. 1973); Ajay Singh (b. 1974); Santosh Lad (b. 1975); Madhu Bangarappa (b. c. 1966–67); Priyank Kharge (b. 1978); Rizwan Arshad (b. 1979); Yathindra Siddaramaiah (b. 1980)
Total	32	—N/a

No Millennial or Generation Z ministers serve in the ministry as of 22 September 2026. B. Nagendra (b. 1971, Gen X) resigned on 28 August 2026; the youngest serving ministers remain Yathindra Siddaramaiah (b. 1980) and Rizwan Arshad (b. 1979).

=== By legislative experience ===
Name	Constituency	Assembly Terms	Notes
D. K. Shivakumar	Kanakapura	8	First elected from the erstwhile Sathanur in 1989; representing Kanakapura since 2008
Ramalinga Reddy	B.T.M Layout	8	Previously represented the erstwhile Jayanagara constituency (1989–2008); representing B.T.M Layout since 2008
Basavaraj Rayareddy	Yelburga	6	Also a one-term 11th Lok Sabha MP (1996–1998) from Koppal; Higher Education Minister, 2016–2018
K. J. George	Sarvagnanagar	6	
G. Parameshwara	Koratagere	6	Three terms from Madhugiri (1989, 1994, 1999); three terms from Koratagere (2008, 2018, 2023); lost Koratagere in 2013
B. Z. Zameer Ahmed Khan	Chamrajpet	5	Former Waqf Minister, Second Siddaramaiah ministry
H. C. Balakrishna	Magadi	5	
Krishna Byre Gowda	Byatarayanapura	5	One term from the erstwhile Vemagal (2003); four terms from Byatarayanapura (2008, 2013, 2018, 2023)
U. T. Khader	Mangalore	5	First elected in the 2007 Ullal by-election following the death of his father U. T. Fareed
Satish Jarkiholi	Yemkanmardi	4	Representing Yemkanmardi since its creation following the 2008 delimitation (2008, 2013, 2018, 2023); previously a Member of the Karnataka Legislative Council (MLC) from the Belgaum District Local Authorities Constituency (1998–2008)
Eshwara Khandre	Bhalki	4	Representing Bhalki since 2008
Sharan Prakash Patil	Sedam	4	Three consecutive terms 2004–2018; lost in 2018; returned in 2023
Santosh Lad	Kalghatgi	4	Former Labour Minister, Second Siddaramaiah ministry
S. S. Mallikarjun	Davanagere North	4	Two terms from Davanagere North (2013, 2023); Minister of Mines & Geology and Horticulture, Second Siddaramaiah ministry, 2023–2026
N. Chaluvaraya Swamy	Nagamangala	4	
Laxman Savadi	Athani	4	Also previously Deputy Chief Minister of Karnataka (under a BJP-led ministry, prior to his 2023 switch to Congress)
K. M. Shivalinge Gowda	Arsikere	4	
C. Puttarangashetty	Chamarajanagar	4	
Priyank Kharge	Chittapur	3	Three consecutive terms from 2013
Ajay Singh	Jevargi	3	Son of former Chief Minister Dharam Singh
P. M. Narendraswamy	Malavalli	3	
Shivaraj Tangadagi	Kanakagiri	3	Minor Irrigation Minister, 2013–2018 (First Siddaramaiah ministry); Backward Classes Welfare and Kannada & Culture Minister, 2023–2026 (Second Siddaramaiah ministry)
Rudrappa Lamani	Haveri	3	One term from the erstwhile Byadgi constituency (1999–2004) before its 2008 abolition; two terms from Haveri (2013, 2023); Deputy Speaker of the Karnataka Legislative Assembly, July 2023 – August 2026
T. Raghumurthy	Challakere	3	
Byrathi Suresh	Hebbal	2	Won 2018 and 2023
Rizwan Arshad	Shivajinagar	2	
Madhu Bangarappa	Soraba	2	Won 2013 (as Janata Dal (Secular)) and 2023 (as Indian National Congress); former Primary & Secondary Education Minister, Second Siddaramaiah ministry; son of former Chief Minister S. Bangarappa
Vijayanand Kashappanavar	Hungund	2	
K. H. Muniyappa	Devanahalli	1	Seven-time MP from Kolar (1991–2019); first elected to the Assembly in 2023
K. S. Basavanthappa	Mayakonda	1	First-time MLA
Yathindra Siddaramaiah	MLC (no constituency)	1 (MLA); 1 (MLC)	Member of the Karnataka Legislative Council since June 2024; 2018–23 prior Assembly term
Total	—N/a	123	—N/a

The combined ministry has 123 cumulative Assembly terms across its 32 active members, following the removal of B. Nagendra's 4 terms on his resignation. Basavaraj Rayareddy, with six terms, is the most experienced of the 3 August inductees. K. S. Basavanthappa is the only first-time MLA among the 19 inducted on 3 August, joining K. H. Muniyappa as the ministry's two members serving their first Assembly term.

== See also ==
- Karnataka Legislative Assembly
- Karnataka Legislative Council
- 2023 Karnataka Legislative Assembly election
- Next Karnataka Legislative Assembly election
- Second Siddaramaiah ministry
- D. K. Shivakumar
- Greater Bengaluru Authority
- 2026 Greater Bengaluru Authority elections
- 2015 Karnataka Socio-Economic and Education Survey
- Tulu language
