= Basavaraj Bommai ministry =

33rd Council of Ministers of Karnataka, India (2021–2023)

- 33rd Ministry of Karnataka
- 2021–2023
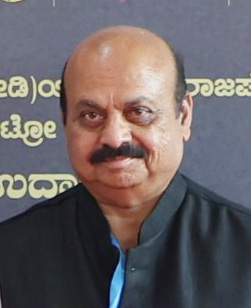
- Basavaraj Bommai in 2023
- Date formed: 28 July 2021
- Date dissolved: 13 May 2023

People and organisations
- Governor: Thawarchand Gehlot
- Chief Minister: Basavaraj Bommai
- Deputy Chief Minister: None
- No. of ministers: 29
- Ministers removed: 2
- Total no. of members: 30
- Member parties: Bharatiya Janata Party
- Status in legislature: Majority
- Opposition party: Indian National Congress; Janata Dal (Secular)
- Opposition leader: Siddaramaiah (Assembly); B. K. Hariprasad (Council)

History
- Election: 2018
- Legislature term: 15th Karnataka Assembly
- Predecessor: Third Yediyurappa ministry
- Successor: Second Siddaramaiah ministry

The Basavaraj Bommai ministry was the 33rd Council of Ministers of Karnataka, headed by Basavaraj Bommai of the Bharatiya Janata Party. It was sworn in on 28 July 2021 and served until 13 May 2023, when it was succeeded by the Second Siddaramaiah ministry. The Governor of Karnataka, Thawarchand Gehlot, administered the oath of office and secrecy to Bommai at the Glass House of Raj Bhavan, Bengaluru. The ministry had no Deputy Chief Minister throughout its tenure.

== Background ==
=== Basavaraj Bommai ===
Basavaraj Bommai (born 28 January 1960) is a mechanical engineering graduate from B. V. Bhoomaraddi College of Engineering & Technology, Hubballi, who worked briefly at Tata Motors in Pune before entering politics. He began his political career with the Janata Dal in the mid-1990s, serving as General Secretary of the party and as a member of the Karnataka Legislative Council from the Dharwad local authorities constituency in 1998 and again in 2004. He joined the Bharatiya Janata Party in February 2008 and was first elected to the Karnataka Legislative Assembly from Shiggaon (Haveri district) in the same year, a seat he has held since. He is the son of S. R. Bommai, the 11th Chief Minister of Karnataka, making him and his father the second father-son duo in Karnataka's history - alongside H. D. Deve Gowda and H. D. Kumaraswamy - to have each served as chief minister. A member of the Veerashaiva-Lingayat community, he served as Minister for Water Resources under three successive chief ministers from 2008 to 2013, and as Minister for Home Affairs, Law, Parliamentary Affairs, and Co-operation in the Fourth Yediyurappa ministry from July 2019.

=== Leadership transition ===
B. S. Yediyurappa resigned as Chief Minister on 26 July 2021, on the second anniversary of his government's formation, ending months of speculation about his departure. The BJP legislature party met the following day at a private hotel in Bengaluru, with Union Ministers Dharmendra Pradhan and G. Kishan Reddy serving as central observers. The party unanimously elected Bommai as the new leader of the legislature party, following which he drove to Raj Bhavan alongside Yediyurappa to stake claim to form the government. Governor Thawarchand Gehlot administered the oath of office to Bommai as the 23rd Chief Minister of Karnataka at the Glass House of Raj Bhavan at 11 am on 28 July 2021.

=== Cabinet expansion ===
A week after his own swearing-in, Bommai inducted 29 ministers into his cabinet on 4 August 2021, with the oath administered by Governor Gehlot at Raj Bhavan. Of the 29 ministers, 23 had previously served in the Yediyurappa cabinet, while six - V. Sunil Kumar, Araga Jnanendra, Munirathna, Halappa Achar, Shankar Patil Munenakoppa, and B. C. Nagesh - were new faces. Ten of the inductees were legislators who had defected from the Congress-JD(S) coalition in 2019, facilitating the collapse of the Second H. D. Kumaraswamy ministry and the BJP's return to power. No Deputy Chief Minister was appointed. The cabinet's composition included eight Lingayats, seven Vokkaligas, seven OBCs, three Scheduled Caste members, two Brahmins, one Scheduled Tribe member, and one woman - Shashikala Jolle.

== Policies and legislation ==
=== OBC reservation and Muslim quota ===
In its final cabinet meeting before the 2023 Karnataka Legislative Assembly election, held on 24 March 2023, the Bommai government scrapped the 4% reservation for Muslims under the OBC Category 2B and redistributed it equally between the Vokkaliga (new Category 2C, raised from 4% to 6%) and Veerashaiva-Lingayat (new Category 2D, raised from 5% to 7%) communities. Muslims were moved to the 10% Economically Weaker Sections (EWS) category. Bommai stated that there was no constitutional provision for reservation on religious grounds and framed the decision as a proactive measure to forestall judicial challenge. The move, coming one month before polling, was widely interpreted as an effort to consolidate the support of the two dominant OBC communities ahead of the elections. The decision was subsequently challenged before the Supreme Court; the incoming Second Siddaramaiah ministry administered reservations under court-directed status quo, leaving the underlying order in contested legal limbo.

== Controversies ==
=== K. S. Eshwarappa resignation ===
Santosh Patil, a Belagavi-based contractor hired by the Rural Development and Panchayat Raj Department in 2019 to construct roads worth ₹4 crore in Hindalga village, was found dead at a hotel in Udupi on 12 April 2022. In a purported WhatsApp suicide note, Patil accused RDPR Minister K. S. Eshwarappa and his aides of demanding a 40% commission for the release of payments due to him. Police registered a case of abetment of suicide against Eshwarappa. Despite initially rejecting calls for his resignation, Eshwarappa submitted his resignation to Bommai on the evening of 15 April 2022, after the BJP central leadership - including national president J. P. Nadda - directed him to step down to prevent further electoral damage to the party. Eshwarappa stated his resignation was intended to prevent embarrassment to his party and expressed confidence that he would be cleared by the investigation.

=== Death of Umesh Katti ===
Umesh Katti, the Minister for Food, Civil Supplies & Consumer Affairs and Forest, died on 6 September 2022 due to cardiac complications. Katti had represented the Hukkeri constituency in Belagavi district and was a senior BJP leader who had served across multiple ministries since 2010. Chief Minister Bommai described him as "a very close friend" and called his death "a huge loss for the state."

== Council of Ministers ==
Portfolio	Minister	Took office	Left office	Party
Chief Minister and also in-charge of: Department of Finance; Department of Cabinet Affairs; Department of Personnel and Administrative Reforms; Department of Intelligence; Department of Bengaluru Development; All other departments not allocated to any Minister.	Basavaraj Bommai	28 July 2021	20 May 2023	BJP
Minister of Major and Medium Irrigation	Govind Karjol	4 August 2021	20 May 2023	BJP
Minister of Rural Development and Panchayati Raj	K. S. Eshwarappa	4 August 2021	15 April 2022	BJP
Minister of Rural Development and Panchayati Raj	Basavaraj Bommai	15 April 2022	20 May 2023	BJP
Minister of Revenue	R. Ashoka	4 August 2021	20 May 2023	BJP
Minister of Transport; Minister of Tribal Welfare	B. Sriramulu	4 August 2021	20 May 2023	BJP
Minister of Housing; Minister of Infrastructure Development	V. Somanna	4 August 2021	20 May 2023	BJP
Minister of Food, Civil Supplies and Consumer Affairs; Minister of Forest	Umesh Katti	4 August 2021	6 September 2022	BJP
Minister of Food, Civil Supplies and Consumer Affairs; Minister of Forest	Basavaraj Bommai	6 September 2022	20 May 2023	BJP
Minister of Ports and Inland Transport; Minister of Fisheries	S. Angara	4 August 2021	20 May 2023	BJP
Minister of Law; Minister of Parliamentary Affairs; Minister of Minor Irrigation	J. C. Madhu Swamy	4 August 2021	20 May 2023	BJP
Minister of Home Affairs	Araga Jnanendra	4 August 2021	20 May 2023	BJP
Minister of Higher Education; Minister of Information Technology and Biotechnology; Minister of Science and Technology; Minister of Skill Development	C. N. Ashwath Narayan	4 August 2021	20 May 2023	BJP
Minister of Public Works	C. C. Patil	4 August 2021	20 May 2023	BJP
Minister of Environment; Minister of Tourism	Anand Singh	4 August 2021	20 May 2023	BJP
Minister of Environment; Minister of Tourism	Anand Singh	4 August 2021	20 May 2023	BJP
Minister of Social Welfare; Minister of Backward Classes Welfare	Kota Srinivas Poojary	4 August 2021	20 May 2023	BJP
Minister of Animal Husbandry	Prabhu Chauhan	4 August 2021	20 May 2023	BJP
Minister of Large and Medium Enterprises	Murugesh Nirani	4 August 2021	20 May 2023	BJP
Minister of Labour	Shivaram Hebbar	4 August 2021	20 May 2023	BJP
Minister of Co-operation	S. T. Somashekhar	4 August 2021	20 May 2023	BJP
Minister of Agriculture	B. C. Patil	4 August 2021	20 May 2023	BJP
Minister of Urban Development	Byrati Basavaraj	4 August 2021	20 May 2023	BJP
Minister of Health and Family Welfare; Minister of Medical Education	K. Sudhakar	4 August 2021	20 May 2023	BJP
Minister of Excise	K. Gopalaiah	4 August 2021	20 May 2023	BJP
Minister of Muzrai; Minister of Haj and Waqf	Shashikala Jolle	4 August 2021	20 May 2023	BJP
Minister of Municipal Administration; Minister of Small Scale Industries; Minister of Public Sector Industries	M. T. B. Nagaraj	4 August 2021	20 May 2023	BJP
Minister of Youth Empowerment and Sports; Minister of Sericulture	Narayana Gowda	4 August 2021	20 May 2023	BJP
Minister of Primary and Secondary Education	B. C. Nagesh	4 August 2021	20 May 2023	BJP
Minister of Energy; Minister of Kannada and Culture	V. Sunil Kumar	4 August 2021	20 May 2023	BJP
Minister of Mines and Geology; Minister of Women and Child Development	Halappa Achar	4 August 2021	20 May 2023	BJP
Minister of Handloom and Textiles; Minister of Sugarcane Development and Sugar	Shankar Patil	4 August 2021	20 May 2023	BJP
Minister of Horticulture; Minister of Planning, Programme Monitoring and Statistics	Munirathna	4 August 2021	20 May 2023	BJP

== District-wise representation ==
Representation of cabinet ministers by district (as constituted at formation, August 2021)
1. Bagalkote (6.67%)
2. Belagavi (6.67%)
3. Bellary (3.33%)
4. Bengaluru Urban (23.3%)
5. Bengaluru Rural (3.33%)
6. Bidar (3.33%)
7. Chikkaballapura (3.33%)
8. Chitradurga (3.33%)
9. Dakshina Kannada (3.33%)
10. Dharwad (3.33%)
11. Gadag (3.33%)
12. Haveri (6.67%)
13. Koppal (3.33%)
14. Mandya (3.33%)
15. Shivamogga (6.67%)
16. Tumakuru (6.67%)
17. Udupi (6.67%)
18. Uttara Kannada (3.33%)

District	Cabinet Ministers	Name of Ministers
Bagalkote	2	Govind Karjol; Murugesh Nirani
Belagavi	2	Umesh Katti †; Shashikala Jolle
Ballari	1	Anand Singh
Bengaluru Urban	7	R. Ashoka; C. N. Ashwath Narayan; V. Somanna; S. T. Somashekhar; Byrati Basavaraj; K. Gopalaiah; Munirathna
Bengaluru Rural	1	M. T. B. Nagaraj (MLC)
Bidar	1	Prabhu Chauhan
Chikkaballapura	1	K. Sudhakar
Chitradurga	1	B. Sriramulu
Dakshina Kannada	1	S. Angara
Dharwad	1	Shankar Patil
Gadag	1	C. C. Patil
Haveri	2	Basavaraj Bommai; B. C. Patil
Koppal	1	Halappa Achar
Mandya	1	Narayana Gowda
Shivamogga	2	K. S. Eshwarappa; Araga Jnanendra
Tumakuru	2	J. C. Madhu Swamy; B. C. Nagesh
Udupi	2	V. Sunil Kumar; Kota Srinivas Poojary (MLC)
Uttara Kannada	1	Shivaram Hebbar
Total	30	—N/a

== See also ==
- Karnataka Legislative Assembly
- Karnataka Legislative Council
- 2018 Karnataka Legislative Assembly election
- 2023 Karnataka Legislative Assembly election
- Third Yediyurappa ministry
- Second Siddaramaiah ministry
- Basavaraj Bommai
