= Second Siddaramaiah ministry =

34th Council of Ministers of Karnataka, India (2023–2026)

- 34th Ministry of Karnataka
- 2023–2026
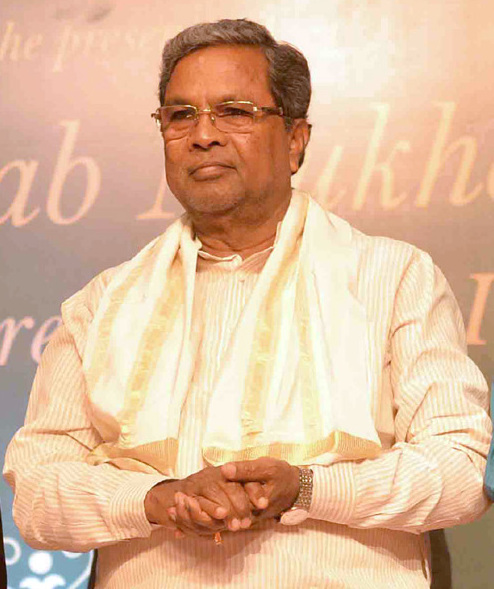
- Siddaramaiah in 2016
- Date formed: 20 May 2023
- Date dissolved: 3 June 2026

People and organisations
- Governor: Thawarchand Gehlot
- Chief Minister: Siddaramaiah
- Deputy Chief Minister: D. K. Shivakumar
- No. of ministers: 31
- Ministers removed: 3
- Total no. of members: 34
- Member parties: Indian National Congress
- Status in legislature: Majority
- Opposition party: Bharatiya Janata Party; Janata Dal (Secular)
- Opposition leader: Chalavadi Narayanaswamy (Council); R. Ashoka (Assembly)

History
- Election: 2023
- Legislature terms: 3 years, 14 days
- Predecessor: Basavaraj Bommai ministry
- Successor: Shivakumar ministry

The Second Siddaramaiah Ministry was the 34th Council of Ministers of Karnataka, headed by Siddaramaiah of the Indian National Congress (see also First Siddaramaiah ministry, 2013-2018). It was sworn in on 20 May 2023 and served until 3 June 2026, when it was succeeded by the Shivakumar ministry. The Governor of Karnataka Thawarchand Gehlot administered the oath of office to the members of the council of ministers. The ministry was formed following the Congress party's decisive victory in the 2023 Karnataka Legislative Assembly election, in which it won 135 of 224 seats.

== Background ==
The swearing-in ceremony was held at Sree Kanteerava Stadium in Bengaluru, in the presence of various leaders from Congress and allied parties. Ten members of the Indian National Congress were sworn in on 20 May 2023, including Chief Minister Siddaramaiah and Deputy Chief Minister D. K. Shivakumar. The cabinet was brought to its full strength of 34 ministers on 27 May 2023, when a further 24 legislators were sworn in at Raj Bhavan.

=== Power-sharing arrangement ===
The Congress high command's decision to appoint Siddaramaiah as Chief Minister came alongside a reported understanding that D. K. Shivakumar - the Karnataka Pradesh Congress Committee president who had led the party's 2023 election campaign - would succeed him midway through the term. This arrangement was not formally announced but was widely acknowledged in political circles, and eventually triggered months of internal speculation from late 2025 onward as Shivakumar and his supporters pushed for the transition. Siddaramaiah resigned on 29 May 2026 following direction from the Congress high command, and Shivakumar was unanimously elected Congress Legislature Party leader on the same day, subsequently being sworn in as Chief Minister on 3 June 2026 with G. Parameshwara as his Deputy Chief Minister.

== Budgets ==
Siddaramaiah, who retained the Finance portfolio throughout the ministry's tenure, presented three full state budgets during this period - each notable for balancing the fiscal cost of the Five Guarantees against demands for capital and infrastructure spending.

The first budget, presented on 7 July 2023 for the financial year 2023-24, was Siddaramaiah's record 14th as Finance Minister of Karnataka. The total budget outlay was ₹3.27 lakh crore, with approximately ₹52,000 crore earmarked for the implementation of the five guarantee schemes.

The second budget, presented on 16 February 2024 for 2024-25, was his 15th. The outlay was ₹3.71 lakh crore, with the five guarantee schemes allocated ₹52,009 crore. The revenue deficit for 2024-25 was estimated at ₹27,354 crore (1% of GSDP), higher than the previous year; Siddaramaiah defended the state's fiscal position, noting that Karnataka's fiscal deficit of 2.95% of GSDP and total borrowings remained within the limits set under the Karnataka Fiscal Responsibility Act, 2002.

The third budget, presented on 7 March 2025 for 2025-26, was Siddaramaiah's record 16th budget - the most presented by any finance minister in Karnataka's history. Total expenditure was projected at ₹4.09 lakh crore, a 12% increase over the revised estimates for 2024-25. Capital expenditure was raised to ₹71,336 crore, up 27%, reflecting a course correction toward infrastructure investment after two years dominated by welfare spending. A new Chief Minister's Infrastructure Development Programme (CMIDP) was announced with ₹8,000 crore for roads, minor irrigation, and urban infrastructure across all assembly constituencies. The five guarantees were allocated ₹51,034 crore. The fiscal deficit was targeted at 2.9% of GSDP (₹90,428 crore), and the state's total liabilities were estimated at 24.91% of GSDP - within the statutory ceiling.

== Policies and legislation ==
=== Five Guarantees ===
The ministry's central policy programme was the implementation of five pre-election guarantees that the Indian National Congress had promised during the 2023 state elections. The five schemes - Gruha Jyoti (200 units of free electricity per household per month), Gruha Lakshmi (₹2,000 monthly cash transfer to the woman head of each family), Anna Bhagya (10 kg of free rice to BPL household members), Shakti (free travel for women on state public transport buses), and Yuva Nidhi (₹3,000 per month for unemployed graduates and ₹1,500 for unemployed diploma holders, for up to two years) - were launched in phased manner between June and August 2023. By the 2025-26 budget year, the government had allocated ₹51,034 crore for the five schemes, with over 1.24 crore women receiving support through Gruha Lakshmi, 1.63 crore households benefiting from Gruha Jyoti, and 4.08 crore people covered under Anna Bhagya.

=== Greater Bengaluru Governance Act, 2024 ===
On 23 July 2024, the ministry introduced the Greater Bengaluru Governance Bill, 2024 in the Karnataka Legislative Assembly, replacing the Bruhat Bengaluru Mahanagara Palike Act, 2020. The Act established the Greater Bengaluru Authority (GBA) as an apex coordinating body and provided for the replacement of the Bruhat Bengaluru Mahanagara Palike (BBMP) with up to seven city corporations. The government officially notified the GBA's formation on 14 May 2025, with it coming into force on 15 May 2025; Chief Minister Siddaramaiah became its first chairman and Deputy Chief Minister D. K. Shivakumar its vice-chairman.

=== Socio-Economic and Educational Survey (Caste Census) ===
The ministry commissioned a fresh Socio-Economic and Educational Survey - popularly referred to as a caste census - through the Karnataka State Commission for Backward Classes, the previous survey having been conducted in 2015 but not accepted by subsequent governments. The new survey, covering nearly 5.9 crore of Karnataka's estimated 6.26 crore population, was conducted in 2025 at a cost of ₹635 crore and included 54 questions spanning social, economic, and educational indicators. Chief Minister Siddaramaiah received the completed report from the Commission on 27 May 2026, days before the ministry's dissolution.

=== Local Candidates Reservation Bill (withdrawn) ===
In July 2024, the Cabinet approved the Karnataka State Employment of Local Candidates in the Industries, Factories and Other Establishments Bill, 2024, which would have mandated private sector establishments to reserve 50% of management positions and 70% of non-management positions for local candidates - defined as persons born in Karnataka or resident for at least 15 years with Kannada proficiency. The bill drew immediate and intense criticism from industry bodies, including Nasscom, which warned that restrictions on talent could force companies to relocate and that the tech sector, which contributes approximately 25% of the state's GDP, would be adversely affected. Chief Minister Siddaramaiah announced within three days of the Cabinet's approval that the bill had been put on hold for further deliberations; it was not reintroduced during the ministry's remaining tenure.

=== OBC reservation and Muslim quota ===
The ministry inherited a contested reservation order from its predecessor: the Bommai government's March 2023 decision to scrap the 4% OBC reservation for Muslims under Category 2B, redistributing it between the Vokkaliga (Category 2C, +2%) and Veerashaiva-Lingayat (Category 2D, +2%) communities. This decision had been challenged before the Supreme Court, which had directed that the status quo be maintained pending adjudication. The Siddaramaiah government accordingly continued administering reservations under the existing court-directed status quo without formally restoring or confirming the Muslim quota, as the matter remained sub judice throughout the ministry's tenure.

== Controversies ==
=== Valmiki Corporation scam ===
The ministry's first major controversy emerged in May 2024, when Chandrashekhar P., an accounts superintendent at the Karnataka Maharshi Valmiki Scheduled Tribes Development Corporation Limited, died by suicide leaving a note alleging the illegal transfer of ₹187.3 crore from the corporation's Union Bank of India account. B. Nagendra, the then-Minister for Scheduled Tribes Welfare, resigned on 6 June 2024 amid mounting allegations of his involvement (see Former Ministers). The Enforcement Directorate arrested Nagendra in July 2024 following raids at over 15 locations across Karnataka, Andhra Pradesh, and Telangana. The ED subsequently filed a chargesheet naming Nagendra as the primary accused. The Karnataka High Court directed the CBI to take up a full investigation in July 2025; the CBI filed three chargesheets on 3 June 2026 naming Nagendra as the primary accused across all three, along with 29 others, in relation to the misappropriation of funds from the corporation, the Scheduled Tribes Welfare Department, and the Karnataka German Technical Training Institute.

=== MUDA site-allotment case ===
The Mysuru Urban Development Authority (MUDA) site-allotment case dominated Karnataka politics from mid-2024. The case centres on allegations that MUDA allotted 14 compensatory plots in an upmarket area of Mysuru to Chief Minister Siddaramaiah's wife, B. M. Parvathi, under a 50:50 ratio scheme, in lieu of 3.16 acres of her land used for a residential layout - with the allotted plots alleged to be worth substantially more than the acquired land. Governor Thawarchand Gehlot granted sanction for prosecution against Siddaramaiah in August 2024; the Chief Minister challenged this in the Karnataka High Court, which dismissed his petition on 24 September 2024 and upheld the Governor's sanction. The Lokayukta police registered an FIR against Siddaramaiah and others on 27 September 2024, and the Enforcement Directorate subsequently launched a parallel money-laundering investigation. Parvathi voluntarily wrote to MUDA offering to return the 14 plots in October 2024. Siddaramaiah denied wrongdoing throughout and characterised the case as politically motivated. The BJP-JD(S) opposition persistently demanded his resignation; Siddaramaiah did not resign and served out the full term of the ministry.

== Council of Ministers ==
Sr. No.	Name	Portraits	Constituency	Designation	Portfolio(s)	Party	Term of Office		
Sr. No.	Name	Portraits	Constituency	Designation	Portfolio(s)	Party	Took Office	Left Office	Duration
Chief Minister
1	Siddaramaiah		Varuna	Chief Minister	Finance; Cabinet Affairs; Personnel and Administrative Reforms; Intelligence; Information and Public Relations; Youth Services; Sports; S.T. Welfare; Co-operation (excluding Agricultural Marketing); Other Departments not allocated to any minister	INC	20 May 2023	3 June 2026	3 years, 14 days
Deputy Chief Minister
2	D. K. Shivakumar		Kanakapura	Deputy Chief Minister	Major and Medium Irrigation; Bengaluru City Development (including GBA, BDA, BWSSB, BMRDA, BMRCL) (Connected to these authorities related to Town Planning)	INC	20 May 2023	3 June 2026	3 years, 14 days
Cabinet Ministers
3	G. Parameshwara		Koratagere	Cabinet Minister	Home (excluding Intelligence)	INC	20 May 2023	3 June 2026	3 years, 14 days
4	H. K. Patil		Gadag	Cabinet Minister	Law; Parliamentary Affairs; Legislation; Tourism	INC	20 May 2023	3 June 2026	3 years, 14 days
5	K. H. Muniyappa		Devanahalli	Cabinet Minister	Food & Civil Supplies; Consumer Affairs	INC	20 May 2023	3 June 2026	3 years, 14 days
6	K. J. George		Sarvagnanagar	Cabinet Minister	Energy	INC	20 May 2023	3 June 2026	3 years, 14 days
7	M. B. Patil		Babaleshwar	Cabinet Minister	Large & Medium Industries; Infrastructure Development	INC	20 May 2023	3 June 2026	3 years, 14 days
8	Ramalinga Reddy		B.T.M Layout	Cabinet Minister	Transport; Muzrai	INC	20 May 2023	3 June 2026	3 years, 14 days
9	Satish Jarkiholi		Yemkanmardi	Cabinet Minister	Public Works Department	INC	20 May 2023	3 June 2026	3 years, 14 days
10	Priyank Kharge		Chittapur	Cabinet Minister	Rural Development; Panchayati Raj; IT & BT	INC	20 May 2023	3 June 2026	3 years, 14 days
11	B. Z. Zameer Ahmed Khan		Chamrajpet	Cabinet Minister	Housing; Waqf; Minorities	INC	20 May 2023	3 June 2026	3 years, 14 days
12	Krishna Byre Gowda		Byatarayanapura	Cabinet Minister	Revenue (excluding Muzrai)	INC	20 May 2023	3 June 2026	3 years, 14 days
13	Dinesh Gundu Rao		Gandhi Nagar	Cabinet Minister	Health & Family Welfare	INC	27 May 2023	3 June 2026	3 years, 7 days
14	N. Chaluvaraya Swamy		Nagamangala	Cabinet Minister	Agriculture	INC	27 May 2023	3 June 2026	3 years, 7 days
15	K. Venkatesh		Periyapatna	Cabinet Minister	Animal Husbandry; Sericulture; Planning & Statistics	INC	27 May 2023	3 June 2026	3 years, 7 days
16	H. C. Mahadevappa		Tirumakudalu Narasipura	Cabinet Minister	Social Welfare	INC	27 May 2023	3 June 2026	3 years, 7 days
17	Eshwara Khandre		Bhalki	Cabinet Minister	Forest; Ecology; Environment	INC	27 May 2023	3 June 2026	3 years, 7 days
18	Sharanabasappa Darshanapur		Shahapur	Cabinet Minister	Small Scale Industries; Public Enterprises	INC	27 May 2023	3 June 2026	3 years, 7 days
19	Shivanand Patil		Basavana Bagevadi	Cabinet Minister	Textiles; Sugarcane Development & Directorate of Sugar; Agricultural Marketing	INC	27 May 2023	3 June 2026	3 years, 7 days
20	R. B. Timmapur		Mudhol	Cabinet Minister	Excise	INC	27 May 2023	3 June 2026	3 years, 7 days
21	S. S. Mallikarjun		Davanagere North	Cabinet Minister	Mines & Geology; Horticulture	INC	27 May 2023	3 June 2026	3 years, 7 days
22	Shivaraj Tangadagi		Kanakagiri	Cabinet Minister	Backward Classes; Kannada & Culture	INC	27 May 2023	3 June 2026	3 years, 7 days
23	Sharan Prakash Patil		Sedam	Cabinet Minister	Medical Education; Skill Development	INC	27 May 2023	3 June 2026	3 years, 7 days
24	M. S. Vaidya		Bhatkal	Cabinet Minister	Fisheries & Ports; Inland Transport	INC	27 May 2023	3 June 2026	3 years, 7 days
25	Lakshmi Hebbalkar		Belagavi Rural	Cabinet Minister	Women & Child Development; Disabled & Senior Citizens Empowerment	INC	27 May 2023	3 June 2026	3 years, 7 days
26	Rahim Khan		Bidar	Cabinet Minister	Municipal Administration; Haj	INC	27 May 2023	3 June 2026	3 years, 7 days
27	N. S. Boseraju		MLC	Cabinet Minister	Minor Irrigation; Science & Technology	INC	27 May 2023	3 June 2026	3 years, 7 days
28	Santosh Lad		Kalghatgi	Cabinet Minister	Labour	INC	27 May 2023	3 June 2026	3 years, 7 days
29	Byrathi Suresh		Hebbal	Cabinet Minister	Urban Development & Town Planning (including KUWSDB & KUIDFC) (excluding Bengaluru City Development)	INC	27 May 2023	3 June 2026	3 years, 7 days
30	Madhu Bangarappa		Sorab	Cabinet Minister	Primary & Secondary Education	INC	27 May 2023	3 June 2026	3 years, 7 days
31	M. C. Sudhakar		Chintamani	Cabinet Minister	Higher Education	INC	27 May 2023	3 June 2026	3 years, 7 days

== Former Ministers ==
SI No.	Name	Portraits	Constituency	Designation	Department	Party	Took Office	Left Office	Duration	Reason
1	B. Nagendra		Bellary Rural	Cabinet Minister	Youth Services; Sports; ST Welfare	INC	27 May 2023	6 June 2024	1 year, 10 days	(Note: Resigned amid allegations of the illegal transfer of money from the State-run Karnataka Maharshi Valmiki Scheduled Tribes Development Corporation Limited.)
2	K. N. Rajanna		Madhugiri	Cabinet Minister	Co-operation (excluding Agricultural Marketing)	INC	27 May 2023	11 August 2025	2 years, 76 days	(Note: Ousted from cabinet after the Congress high command demanded action against him for publicly criticising Rahul Gandhi's 'Vote Chori' allegation.)
3	D. Sudhakar †		Hiriyur	Cabinet Minister	Planning & Statistics	INC	27 May 2023	10 May 2026	2 years, 348 days	(Note: Died in office on 10 May 2026 following a prolonged lung infection. He had been undergoing treatment at the Krishna Institute of Medical Sciences, Bengaluru, for approximately two months.)

== Cabinet Reshuffles ==
=== 6 June 2024 ===
Name	Existing Portfolios	Modified Portfolios
B. Nagendra	Youth Services, Sports, ST Welfare	Dropped
Siddaramaiah	Finance, Cabinet Affairs, Personnel and Administrative Reforms, Intelligence, Information and Public Relations, Other Departments not allocated to any minister	Finance, Cabinet Affairs, Personnel and Administrative Reforms, Intelligence, Information and Public Relations, Youth Services, Sports, S.T. Welfare, Other Departments not allocated to any minister

=== 11 August 2025 ===
Name	Existing Portfolios	Modified Portfolios
K. N. Rajanna	Co-operation (excluding Agricultural Marketing)	Dropped
Siddaramaiah	Finance, Cabinet Affairs, Personnel and Administrative Reforms, Intelligence, Information and Public Relations, Youth Services, Sports, ST Welfare, Other Departments not allocated to any minister	Finance, Cabinet Affairs, Personnel and Administrative Reforms, Intelligence, Information and Public Relations, Youth Services, Sports, ST Welfare, Co-operation (excluding Agricultural Marketing), Other Departments not allocated to any minister

=== 25 May 2026 ===
Following the death in office of D. Sudhakar on 10 May 2026, the Planning & Statistics portfolio was redistributed.

Name	Existing Portfolios	Modified Portfolios
D. Sudhakar †	Planning & Statistics	Vacant (died in office, 10 May 2026)
Siddaramaiah	Finance, Cabinet Affairs, Personnel and Administrative Reforms, Intelligence, Information and Public Relations, Youth Services, Sports, ST Welfare, Co-operation (excluding Agricultural Marketing), Other Departments not allocated to any minister	Finance, Cabinet Affairs, Personnel and Administrative Reforms, Intelligence, Information and Public Relations, Youth Services, Sports, ST Welfare, Co-operation (excluding Agricultural Marketing), Other Departments not allocated to any minister
K. Venkatesh	Animal Husbandry, Sericulture	Animal Husbandry, Sericulture, Planning and Statistics

== Demographics of Cabinet Ministers ==
Representation of cabinet ministers by district (as constituted at formation, May 2023)
1. Bagalkote (3.03%)
2. Belagavi (6.06%)
3. Bengaluru North (3.03%)
4. Bengaluru South (3.03%)
5. Bengaluru Urban (18.2%)
6. Bidar (6.06%)
7. Chikkaballapura (3.03%)
8. Chitradurga (3.03%)
9. Davanagere (3.03%)
10. Dharwad (3.03%)
11. Gadag (3.03%)
12. Kalaburagi (6.06%)
13. Koppal (3.03%)
14. Mandya (3.03%)
15. Mysuru (9.09%)
16. Raichur (3.03%)
17. Shivamogga (3.03%)
18. Tumakuru (3.03%)
19. Uttara Kannada (3.03%)
20. Vijayapura (6.06%)
21. Yadagiri (3.03%)

District	Cabinet Ministers	Name of Ministers
Bagalkote	1	R. B. Timmapur
Belagavi	2	Satish Jarkiholi; Lakshmi Hebbalkar
Bengaluru North	1	K. H. Muniyappa
Bengaluru South	1	D. K. Shivakumar
Bengaluru Urban	6	K. J. George; B. Z. Zameer Ahmed Khan; Ramalinga Reddy; Byrathi Suresh; Dinesh Gundu Rao; Krishna Byre Gowda
Bidar	2	Eshwara Khandre; Rahim Khan
Chikkaballapura	1	M. C. Sudhakar
Chitradurga	1	D. Sudhakar †
Davanagere	1	S. S. Mallikarjun
Dharwad	1	Santosh Lad
Gadag	1	H. K. Patil
Kalaburagi	2	Priyank Kharge; Sharan Prakash Patil
Koppal	1	Shivaraj Tangadagi
Mandya	1	N. Chaluvaraya Swamy
Mysuru	3	Siddaramaiah; H. C. Mahadevappa; K. Venkatesh
Raichur	1	N. S. Boseraju
Shivamogga	1	Madhu Bangarappa
Tumakuru	1	G. Parameshwara
Uttara Kannada	1	Mankal Vaidya
Vijayapura	2	Shivanand Patil; M. B. Patil
Yadagiri	1	Sharanabasappa Darshanapur
Total	33	—N/a

== See also ==
- Karnataka Legislative Assembly
- Karnataka Legislative Council
- 2023 Karnataka Legislative Assembly election
- First Siddaramaiah ministry
- D. K. Shivakumar ministry
- Greater Bengaluru Authority
