= Byrathi Suresh =

Indian politician

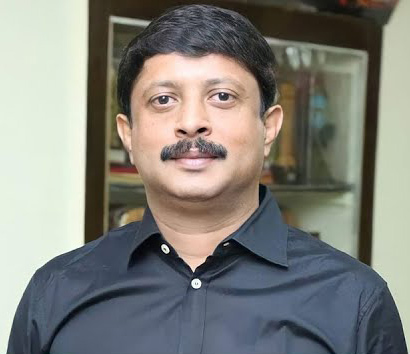
- Byrathi Suresh in 2022

Cabinet Minister Government of Karnataka
- Incumbent
- Assumed office 3 June 2026
- Governor: Thawarchand Gehlot
- Cabinet: Shivakumar ministry
- Chief Minister: D. K. Shivakumar
- Ministry and Departments: Transport
- Preceded by: Ramalinga Reddy
- In office 27 May 2023 – 29 May 2026
- Governor: Thawarchand Gehlot
- Cabinet: Second Siddaramaiah ministry
- Chief Minister: Siddaramaiah
- Ministry and Departments: Urban Development & Town Planning (including KUWSDB & KUIDFC) (excluding Bengaluru City Development)
- Preceded by: Byrati Basavaraj
- Succeeded by: Yathindra Siddaramaiah

Member of Karnataka Legislative Assembly
- Incumbent
- Assumed office 2018
- Preceded by: Y. A. Narayanaswamy
- Constituency: Hebbal

Personal details
- Born: 19 July 1972 (age 54) Byrathi, Bangalore, Karnataka, India
- Party: Indian National Congress
- Spouse: Byrathi Padmavati
- Children: Sanjay byrathi, Swathi Suresh
- Parent: Susheelamma
- Occupation: Politician, Agriculturist

Byrathi Suresh (born 19 July 1972) is an Indian politician from Karnataka. He is currently serving as Cabinet Minister for Transport in Government of Karnataka and as a member of Karnataka Legislative Assembly representing Hebbal. He belongs to Indian National Congress.

== Personal life ==
Suresh is married to Byrathi Padmavati. They have a son and a daughter. His wife Padmavati unsuccessfully contested from Hosakote in the 2019 by-elections.

== Career ==
Suresh began his political career by becoming member of the Karnataka Legislative Council in 2012. He is a close associate of chief minister Siddaramaiah. He quit his MLC post to contest the assembly elections 2018 and got elected as MLA of Hebbal Vidhana Sabha constituency.
