= Kanthi ministry =

Government of Mysore, India in 1962

- 7th Ministry of the Mysore State
- Date formed: 14 March 1962
- Date dissolved: 20 June 1962

People and organisations
- Head of state: Jayachamarajendra Wadiyar (1 November 1956 - 4 May 1963)
- Head of government: S. R. Kanthi
- No. of ministers: 10
- Member parties: Indian National Congress
- Status in legislature: Majority
- Opposition party: Praja Socialist Party
- Opposition leader: S. Shivappa (1962-1967)(assembly)

History
- Election: 1962
- Outgoing election: 1967 (After Third Nijalingappa ministry)
- Legislature term: 99 days
- Budget: 1
- Predecessor: Jatti cabinet
- Successor: Third Nijalingappa cabinet

The S. R. Kanthi cabinet was the Council of Ministers in Mysore State, a state in South India headed by S. R. Kanthi that was formed after the 1962 Mysore Legislative Assembly elections.

== Chief Minister & Cabinet Ministers ==
SI No.	Name	Constituency	Department	Party
1.	S. R. Kanthi; Chief Minister	Hungund	Minister of Finance, Education. Other departments not allocated to a Minister.	INC
2.	M. V. Krishnappa	MLC	Minister of Law & Parliamentary affairs and Labour.	INC
3.	R. M. Patil	Navalgund	Minister of Home affairs.	INC
4.	Yashodhara Dasappa	Hassan	Minister Social Welfare.	INC
5.	Kolur Mallappa	MLC	Minister for Industries and Commerce.	INC
6.	K. Nagappa Alva	Panemangalore	Minister of Health and Family welfare.	INC
7.	B. Rachaiah	Santhemarahalli	Minister of Forest, Agriculture and Cooperation.	INC
8.	Veerendra Patil	Chincholi	Minister of Public Works and Transport.	INC
9.	D. Devaraj Urs	Hunasuru	Minister of Animal Husbandry	INC
10.	D. Devaraj Urs	Hunasuru	Minister of Information	INC

== Minister of State (Deputy Minister) ==
SI No.	Name	Constituency	Department	Party
1.	Maqsood Ali Khan	Bidar		INC
2.	H. R. Abdul Gaffar	Broadway		INC

== See also ==
- Mysore Legislative Assembly
- Mysore Legislative Council
- Politics of Mysore
