= Ajay Singh (Karnataka politician) =

Indian politician in Karnataka (born 1974)

MLA Ajay Dharam Singh
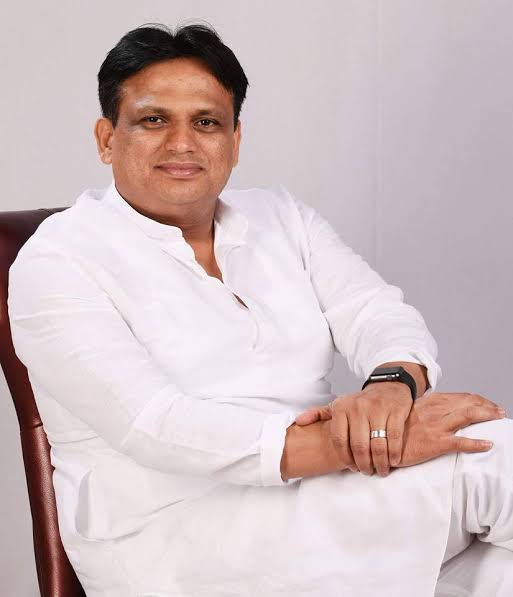

Minor Irrigation, Science & Technology Govt of Karnataka & President of Kalyan Karnataka Region Development Board
- Incumbent
- Assumed office 10 August 2023
- Preceded by: Dattatraya C. Patil Revoor

Deputy Leader of the Opposition in Karnataka Legislative Assembly
- In office 12 March 2020 – 30 January 2022
- Succeeded by: U. T. Khader

Member of Karnataka Legislative Assembly
- Incumbent
- Assumed office May 2013
- Preceded by: Doddappagouda Shivalingappagouda; Patil
- Constituency: Jevargi

General Secretary of Youth Congress of Karnataka
- In office 1999–2009

Personal details
- Born: 29 January 1974 (age 52) Gulbarga, Karnataka, India
- Party: Indian National Congress
- Spouse: Shwetha Ajay Singh
- Relations: Vijay Singh (Elder Brother), Priyadarshini Singh (Sister), Narayan Singh (Grandfather), Padmavathi Singh (Grandmother)
- Children: Saina Singh (daughter), Arhaan Jai Singh (son)
- Parent: Dharam Singh (father) Prabhavati Singh (mother) (father)
- Education: MBBS
- Alma mater: M. S. Ramaiah Medical College, Bangalore
- Occupation: Politician, Social Worker, Medical doctor
- Profession: Agriculturist

Ajay Dharam Singh (born 29 January 1974) is an Indian politician from Karnataka. He is a three time member of the Karnataka Legislative Assembly from Jevaragi constituency. He served as the president of the Kalyan Karnataka Region Development Board. He is also the Deputy Leader of the opposition in the Karnataka Legislative Assembly from 12 March 2020.

== Early life and education ==
Singh was born in Gulbarga, the present Kalaburagi district, Karnataka. He is the son of former chief minister of Karnataka Dharam Singh and Prabhavathi Singh. He completed his M.B.B.S. degree in 1992 at MS Ramaiah Medical College, Bangalore. He married Shwetha and together they have a son, Arhaan Jai Singh and a daughter, Saina Singh.

== Career ==
He served as the general secretary of Youth congress, Karnataka from 1999 to 2009. He became KPCC member in the year 2005. He contested the 2010 by election for Gulbarga South Assembly constituency caused by the demise of the sitting BJP MLA Chandrasekhar Patil Revnoor. He lost to the widow of the late MLA.

He was incharge of the election campaigning for his father, N. Dharam Singh in the 2009 Indian general election in Karnataka from Bidar. Singh won the election by 39619 votes.

He was first elected as an MLA winning the 2013 Karnataka Legislative Assembly election defeating the sitting BJP MLA, Dodapagouda, by a margin of 36,700 votes from Jewargi. He retained the seat for the Indian National Congress in the 2018 Karnataka Legislative Assembly election defeating Doddappa Gouda S. Patil Naribol of the Bharatiya Janata Party, by a margin of 16,056 votes. He was elected for the third consecutive time in the 2023 Karnataka Legislative Assembly election defeating DS Gouda of the Janata Dal (S) by a margin of 10,278 votes.

Singh founded Accident Relief Care in Bangalore in 2000. Around 50,000 accident victims have been helped by his organisation all over India. He has been organising a health camp at Jewargi every year from 2005. He founded the Dharam Singh Foundation, an NGO in 2007. The Dharam Singh Foundation provides free ambulance service to the Jewargi taluka.

== Sports career ==
In 2003, he represented India in the Asian Tenpin Bowling Championship at Bangkok. In 2004, he played for India in the Tenpin World Championship at Malaysia. In 2006, he was part of the six member team at the Doha Asian Games, 2006 in tenpin bowling. He captained the national tenpin bowling team at the indoor Asian games, Macau 2007.

He is the presently vice-president of the Tenpin Bowling Federation (India).
