= Shivaraj Tangadagi =

Indian politician

Cabinet Minister, Government of Karnataka
- Incumbent
- Assumed office 27 May 2023
- Governor: Thawarchand Gehlot
- Cabinet: Second Siddaramaiah ministry
- Chief Minister: Siddaramaiah
- Ministry and Departments: Backward Class; Kannada & Culture
- In office 2013–2018
- Governor: H. R. Bhardwaj; Konijeti Rosaiah; Vajubhai Vala
- Cabinet: First Siddaramaiah ministry
- Chief Minister: Siddaramaiah
- Ministry and Departments: Minor Irrigation

Member of Karnataka Legislative Assembly
- Incumbent
- Assumed office 2023
- Preceded by: Basavaraj Dhadesugur
- Constituency: Kanakagiri
- In office 2008–2018
- Preceded by: Veerappa Devappa Kesarahatti
- Succeeded by: Basavaraj Dhadesugur
- Constituency: Kanakagiri

Personal details
- Party: Indian National Congress
- Occupation: Politician

Shivaraj Tangadagi (10 June 1971) is an Indian politician from Karnataka. He is currently serving as Cabinet Minister in Government of Karnataka and as a member of the Karnataka Legislative Assembly representing Kanakagiri.

== Political party ==
Tangadagi is a member of the Indian National Congress.

== Ministry ==
Tangadagi was the Minister for Minor Irrigation in the Siddaramaiah-led Karnataka Government.
