= Jatti ministry =

Government of Mysore, India (1958–62)

- 6th Council of Ministers of Mysore State
- Jatti ministry
- Date formed: 16 May 1958
- Date dissolved: 9 March 1962

People and organisations
- Head of state: Jayachamarajendra Wadiyar; 1 November 1956 – 4 May 1963 (As Governor of Mysore)
- Head of government: B. D. Jatti
- Member parties: Indian National Congress
- Status in legislature: Majority

History
- Election: 1957
- Outgoing election: 1962
- Legislature terms: 6 years (Council); 5 years (Assembly)
- Predecessor: Second Nijalingappa ministry
- Successor: Kanthi ministry

B. D. Jatti Ministry was the Council of Ministers in Mysore, a state in South India headed by B. D. Jatti of the Indian National Congress.

The ministry had multiple ministers including the Chief Minister. All ministers belonged to the Indian National Congress.

B. D. Jatti became Chief minister after S. Nijalingappa resigned as Chief Minister of Mysore on 15 May 1958.

== Chief Minister & Cabinet Ministers ==
S.No	Name	MLA/MLC	Constituency	Designation	Portfolio	Party	Term of Office	
Chief Minister
1.	B. D. Jatti	MLA	Jamkhandi	Chief Minister	Other departments not allocated to any Minister	Indian National Congress	16 May 1958	9 March 1962
Cabinet Ministers
2.	H. M. Channabasappa	MLA	Krishnarajanagara	Cabinet Minister	Home	Indian National Congress	16 May 1958	9 March 1962
3.	T. Mariappa	MLA	Nagamangala	Cabinet Minister	Finance; Sericulture	Indian National Congress	16 May 1958	9 March 1962
4.	Veerendra Patil	MLA	Chincholi	Cabinet Minister	Excise; Prohibition; Rural Industries	Indian National Congress	February 1961	9 March 1962
5.	Kadidal Manjappa	MLA	Sringeri	Cabinet Minister	Revenue	Indian National Congress	16 May 1958	9 March 1962
6.	N. Rachaiah	MLA	Hunasuru	Cabinet Minister	Agriculture; Excise; Social Welfare	Indian National Congress	16 May 1958	9 March 1962

== See also ==
- Mysore Legislative Assembly
- Mysore Legislative Council
- Politics of Mysore
