= T. Raghumurthy =

Indian politician

Member of the Karnataka Legislative Assembly
- Incumbent
- Assumed office 2013
- Constituency: Challakere

Personal details
- Born: 10 June 1963 (age 63) Kadabanakatte Chitradurga district
- Party: Indian National Congress
- Occupation: Politician and Civil Engineer

T. Raghumurthy (born 10 June 1963) is a civil engineer and politician from the state of Karnataka. He is a member of Indian National Congress. He has won three times consecutively as MLA from Challakere Assembly constituency (ST)he is belongs to cast of naayaka 2013, 2018, 2023. one time minister in D K Shivakumar cabinate

== Positions held ==
- 2013: Elected to Karnataka Legislative Assembly.
- 2018: Re-elected to Karnataka Legislative Assembly.
- 2023: Third time Elected to Karnataka Legislative Assembly
- 26 January 2024 - Incumbent: Karnataka State Small Scale Industries Development Corporation Chairman
