= K. S. Basavanthappa =

Indian politician (born 1970)

Minister for Muzrai, Fisheries, Ports and Inland Water Transport, Karnataka
- Incumbent
- Assumed office 12 August 2026
- Governor: Thawar Chand Gehlot; Sudha Yadav
- Chief Minister: D. K. Shivakumar

Member of the Karnataka Legislative Assembly
- Incumbent
- Assumed office 2023
- Preceded by: N. Linganna
- Constituency: Mayakonda

Personal details
- Born: 20 July 1970 (age 56)
- Party: Indian National Congress

K. S. Basavanthappa (born 20 July 1970) is an Indian politician from Karnataka who serves as the Minister for Muzrai and Fisheries, Ports and Inland Water. He also serves as the district-in-charge minister for Vijayanagara district.

He is a first-time MLA from Mayakonda Assembly constituency which is reserved for SC community in Davangere district. He won the 2023 Karnataka Legislative Assembly election representing Indian National Congress.

== Early life and education ==
Basavanthappa is from Mayakonda, Davangere district. His parents, Sangappa and Hanumakka, were municipal sanitation workers. He belongs to the Madiga community, classified as the Scheduled Caste in Karnataka.

He studied at A.R.G College at Davanagere but discontinued his education during the first year of his pre-university course in 1987-88. During his early life, he assisted his parents with sanitation work and undertook various occupations, including checking tickets at cinema theatres and managing public sanitation contracts.

== Political Career ==
Basavanthappa started his political career as a grassroots worker of the Indian National Congress. His involvement in politics was influenced by former Karnataka minister H. Anjaneya, for whose election campaigns he worked. In 2016, he was elected to the Davanagere Zilla Panchayat and subsequently served as its president.

During the COVID-19 pandemic, he assisted patients seeking medical treatment, and became locally known as "Ambulance Basavanthappa" for his involvement in helping people during medical emergencies.

In the 2023 Karnataka Legislative Assembly election, Basavanthappa was elected from Mayakonda, a constituency reserved for Scheduled Castes. He secured 70,916 votes, defeating independent candidate B. M Pushpa Vagheeshaswamy, who received 37,614 votes, by a margin of 33,614 votes.
