= Third Nijalingappa ministry =

Government of Mysore, India (1962–67)

- 8th Council of Ministers of Mysore State
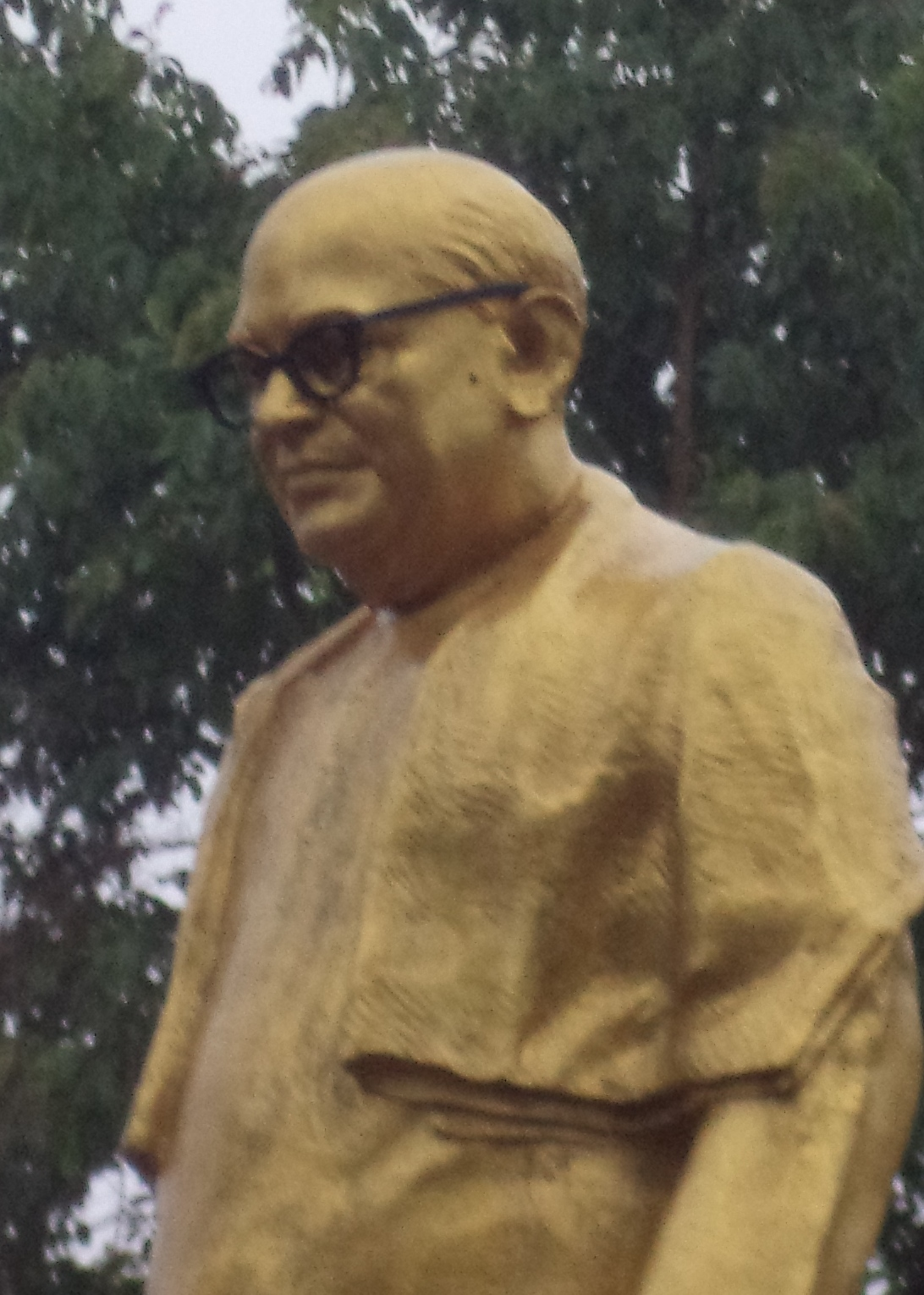
- S. Nijalingappa
- Date formed: 21 June 1962
- Date dissolved: 28 February 1967

People and organisations
- Head of state: Jayachamarajendra Wadiyar (1 November 1956 – 4 May 1963); S. M. Shrinagesh (4 May 1963 – 2 April 1965); V. V. Giri (2 April 1965 – 13 May 1967)
- Head of government: S. Nijalingappa
- Member parties: Indian National Congress
- Status in legislature: Majority
- Opposition party: Praja Socialist Party
- Opposition leader: S. Shivappa (assembly)

History
- Election: 1962
- Outgoing election: 1967
- Legislature terms: 6 years (Council); 5 years (Assembly)
- Predecessor: Kanthi ministry
- Successor: Fourth Nijalingappa ministry

Third S. Nijalingappa Ministry was the Council of Ministers in Mysore, a state in South India headed by S. Nijalingappa of the Indian National Congress.

The ministry had multiple ministers including the Chief Minister. All ministers belonged to the Indian National Congress.

S. Nijalingappa became Chief minister after S. R. Kanthi resigned as Chief Minister of Mysore on 20 June 1962.

== Chief Minister & Cabinet Ministers ==
S.No	Name	MLA/MLC	Constituency	Designation	Portfolio	Party	Term of Office	
Chief Minister
1.	S. Nijalingappa	MLA	Shiggaon	Chief Minister	Other departments not allocated to any Minister	Indian National Congress	21 June 1962	28 February 1967
Cabinet Ministers
2.	B. D. Jatti	MLA	Jamkhandi	Cabinet Minister	Finance	Indian National Congress	21 June 1962	7 June 1965
2.	B. D. Jatti	MLA	Jamkhandi	Cabinet Minister	Food	Indian National Congress	7 June 1965	28 February 1967
3.	Ramakrishna Hegde	MLA	Sirsi	Cabinet Minister	Development; Panchayat Raj; Co-operation	Indian National Congress	21 June 1962	7 June 1965
3.	Ramakrishna Hegde	MLA	Sirsi	Cabinet Minister	Finance; Excise and Prohibition; Information and Publicity	Indian National Congress	7June 1965	28 February 1967
4.	Kalastavadi Puttaswamy	MLA	Chamundeshwari	Cabinet Minister	Municipal Administration	Indian National Congress	21 June 1962	7 June 1965
4.	Kalastavadi Puttaswamy	MLA	Chamundeshwari	Cabinet Minister	Co-operation; Housing	Indian National Congress	7 June 1965	28 February 1967
5.	D. Devaraj Urs	MLA	Hunasuru	Cabinet Minister	Labour?; Transport?; Animal Husbandary?	Indian National Congress	21 June 1962	28 February 1967
6.	Veerendra Patil	MLA	Chincholi	Cabinet Minister	Public Works Department	Indian National Congress	21 June 1962	28 February 1967
7.	S. R. Kanthi	MLA	Hungund	Cabinet Minister	Education	Indian National Congress	21 June 1962	28 February 1967
8.	M. V. Krishnappa	MLC	–	Cabinet Minister	Revenue	Indian National Congress	21 June 1962	28 February 1967
9.	B. Rachaiah	MLA	Santhemarahalli	Cabinet Minister	Forest; Fisheries; Sericulture	Indian National Congress	21 June 1962	28 February 1967
10.	K. Nagappa Alva	MLA	Panemangalore	Cabinet Minister	Health and Family welfare.	Indian National Congress	21 June 1962	28 February 1967

== See also ==
- Mysore Legislative Assembly
- Mysore Legislative Council
- Politics of Mysore
