= Gundu Rao ministry =

Government of Karnataka, India (1980–83)

- 13th Council of Ministers of Karnataka State
- Date formed: 12 January 1980
- Date dissolved: 6 January 1983

People and organisations
- Head of state: Govind Narain (2 August 1977 – 15 April 1982); Ashoknath Banerji (16 April 1982 – 25 February 1987)
- Head of government: R. Gundu Rao
- No. of ministers: 46
- Member parties: Indian National Congress (Indira)
- Status in legislature: Majority
- Opposition party: Indian National Congress (Urs); Janata Party
- Opposition leader: D. Devaraj Urs; A. Lakshmisagar (Assembly)

History
- Election: 1978
- Outgoing election: 1983
- Legislature terms: 6 years (Council); 5 years (Assembly)
- Predecessor: Second Devaraj Urs cabinet
- Successor: First Ramakrishna Hegde cabinet

R. Gundu Rao was the Council of Ministers in Karnataka, a state in South India headed by R. Gundu Rao of the Indian National Congress (Indira).

The ministry had multiple ministers including the Chief Minister. All ministers belonged to the Indian National Congress (Indira).

R. Gundu Rao became Chief minister of Karnataka after the collapse of the Urs government.

His cabinet has a unique record to hold a cabinet meeting outside the capital for the first time in the state's then 25-year-long history. R. Gundu Rao along with his 14 cabinet ministers travelled to distant Belgaum, 515 km from Bangalore, the Cabinet Meeting went on to make a record 42 decisions in three hours sanctioning schemes worth more than Rs 60 crore. The subjects dealt with ranged from water supply, power and irrigation projects to the construction of two wards in a hospital in Karwar district. While Rao claimed that each one of the decisions was "major", opposition leaders dubbed his entourage as a "'touring circus". Bharatiya Janata Party (BJP) leader A. K. Subbiah and Azeez Sait, a former minister and Indian Congress (Socialist) leader had expressed a concern that those kind of Meetings will be a burden on Tax payer's money and Rao was indulging in cheap publicity.

== Chief Minister & Cabinet Ministers ==
S.No	Portfolio	Minister	Constituency	Term of Office		Party
1	Chief Minister *Other departments not allocated to any Minister.	R. Gundu Rao	Somwarpet	12 January 1980	6 January 1983	Indian National Congress (Indira)
2	Finance	Veerappa Moily	Karkal	12 January 1980	6 January 1983	Indian National Congress (Indira)
3	Urban development	Dharam Singh	Jevargi	12 January 1980	6 January 1983	Indian National Congress (Indira)
4	Housing	Dharam Singh	Jevargi	12 January 1980	6 January 1983	Indian National Congress (Indira)
5	Revenue.	Sarekoppa Bangarappa	Sorab	12 January 1980	December 1980	Indian National Congress (Indira)
5	Revenue.	Mallikarjun Kharge	Gurmitkal	December 1980	6 January 1983	Indian National Congress (Indira)
6	Agriculture.	Sarekoppa Bangarappa	Sorab	12 January 1980	6 January 1981	Indian National Congress (Indira)
7	Public Works	Kagodu Thimappa	MLC	February 1980	8 January 1981	Indian National Congress (Indira)
8	Sericulture	Renuka Rajendran	Chikballapur	12 January 1980	14 June 1981	Indian National Congress (Indira)
9	small-scale industries	Renuka Rajendran	Chikballapur	12 January 1980	14 June 1981	Indian National Congress (Indira)
10	Planning	C. M. Ibrahim	Shivajinagar	12 December 1980	1982	Indian National Congress (Indira)
11	Wakf	C. M. Ibrahim	Shivajinagar	12 December 1980	1982	Indian National Congress (Indira)
12	Small Scale Industries	C. M. Ibrahim	Shivajinagar	1981	1982	Indian National Congress (Indira)
13	Labour	C. M. Ibrahim	Shivajinagar	12 December 1980	1982	Indian National Congress (Indira)
14	Food & Civil Supplies	Kagodu Thimappa	MLC	12 December 1980	1981	Indian National Congress (Indira)
14	Food & Civil Supplies	C. M. Ibrahim	Shivajinagar	1981	1982	Indian National Congress (Indira)
14	Food & Civil Supplies	Manik Rao Patil	Aurad	1982	6 January 1983	Indian National Congress (Indira)
15	Parliamentary Affairs	Y. Ramakrishna	Anekal	12 December 1980	6 January 1983	Indian National Congress (Indira)
16	Cooperation	H. C. Srikantaiah	Shravanabelagola	12 December 1980	6 January 1983	Indian National Congress (Indira)
17	Forest	Kagodu Thimappa	MLC	February 1980	8 January 1981	Indian National Congress (Indira)
17	Forest	G. Made Gowda	Kirugavalu	8 January 1981	6 January 1983	Indian National Congress (Indira)
18	Mines and Geology	G. Made Gowda	Kirugavalu	8 January 1981	6 January 1983	Indian National Congress (Indira)

== Minister of State ==
S.No	Portfolio	Minister	Constituency	Term of Office		Party
1.	Horticulture	K. Yenkatappa	Shikaripura	12 December 1980	6 January 1983	Indian National Congress (Indira)
2.	Forest	G. Made Gowda	Kirugavalu	12 December 1980	1981	Indian National Congress (Indira)

== See also ==
- Karnataka Legislative Assembly
