= Second Urs ministry =

Government of Karnataka, India (1978–1980)

- 12th Council of Ministers of Karnataka State
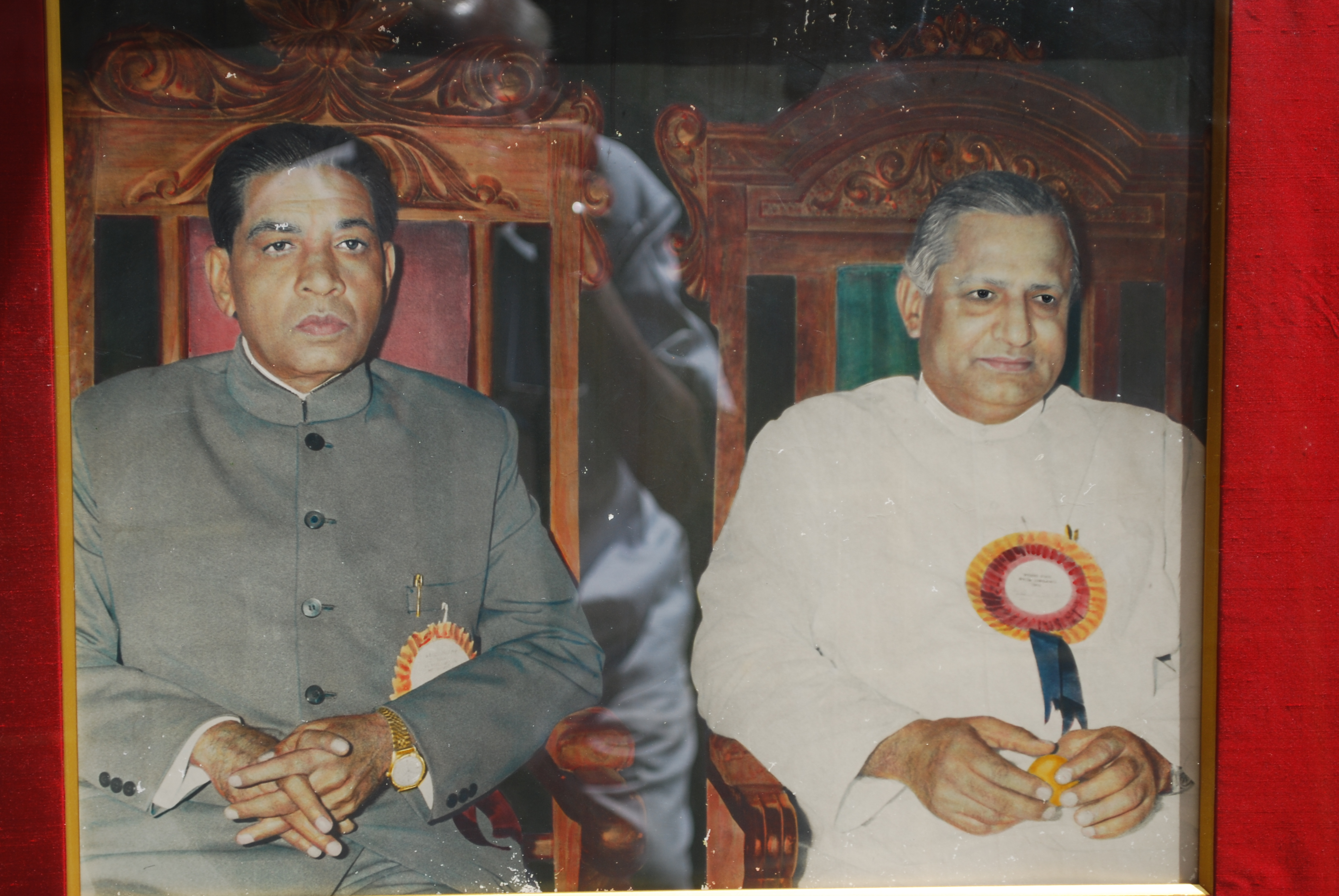
- D. Devaraj Urs; Chief Minister of Karnataka
- Date formed: 28 February 1978
- Date dissolved: 7 January 1980

People and organisations
- Head of state: Govind Narain (2 August 1977 – 15 April 1982)
- Head of government: D. Devaraj Urs
- Member parties: Indian National Congress (Indira); Indian National Congress (U)
- Status in legislature: Majority
- Opposition party: Janata Party; Indian National Congress (Indira)
- Opposition leader: (Legislative Assembly)S. R. Bommai; R. Gundu Rao

History
- Election: 1978
- Outgoing election: 1983 (After Gundu Rao ministry)
- Legislature terms: 6 years (Council); 5 years (Assembly)
- Predecessor: First Devaraj Urs cabinet
- Successor: R. Gundu Rao ministry

D. Devaraj Urs was the Council of Ministers in Karnataka, a state in South India headed by D. Devaraj Urs of the Indian National Congress (Indira).

The ministry had multiple ministers including the Chief Minister. All ministers belonged to the Indian National Congress (Indira).

D. Devaraj Urs became Chief minister of Karnataka after Indian National Congress (Indira) emerged victorious 1978 elections.

== Chief Minister & Cabinet Ministers ==
| S.No | Portfolio | Name | Portrait | Constituency | Term of Office | | Party |
|---|---|---|---|---|---|---|---|
| 1. | Chief Minister *Other departments not allocated to any Minister. | D. Devaraj Urs | | Hunasuru | 28 February 1978 | July 1979 | Indian National Congress (Indira) |
| 1. | Chief Minister *Other departments not allocated to any Minister. | D. Devaraj Urs | | Hunasuru | July 1979 | 7 January 1980 | Indian Congress (Socialist) |
| 2 | Transport; Tourism | R. Gundu Rao | | Somwarpet | 28 February 1978 | 17 December 1979 | Indian National Congress (Indira) |
| 3 | Public works Department. | Sarekoppa Bangarappa | | Sorab | 28 February 1978 | May 1979 | Indian National Congress (Indira) |
| 4 | Municipal Administration | H. C. Srikantaiah | | Shravanabelagola | March 1978 | 7 January 1980 | Indian National Congress (Indira) |
| 5 | Irrigation | D. B. Chandregowda | | MLC | July 1979 | 7 January 1980 | Indian Congress (Socialist) |

== Minister of State ==
| S.No | Portfolio | Name | Portrait | Constituency | Term of Office | Party |
|---|---|---|---|---|---|---|
| 1. | | | | | | Indian National Congress (Indira) |

== See also ==
- Karnataka Legislative Assembly
