= First Urs ministry =

Government of Mysore, India (1972–77)

- 11th Council of Ministers of Mysore State
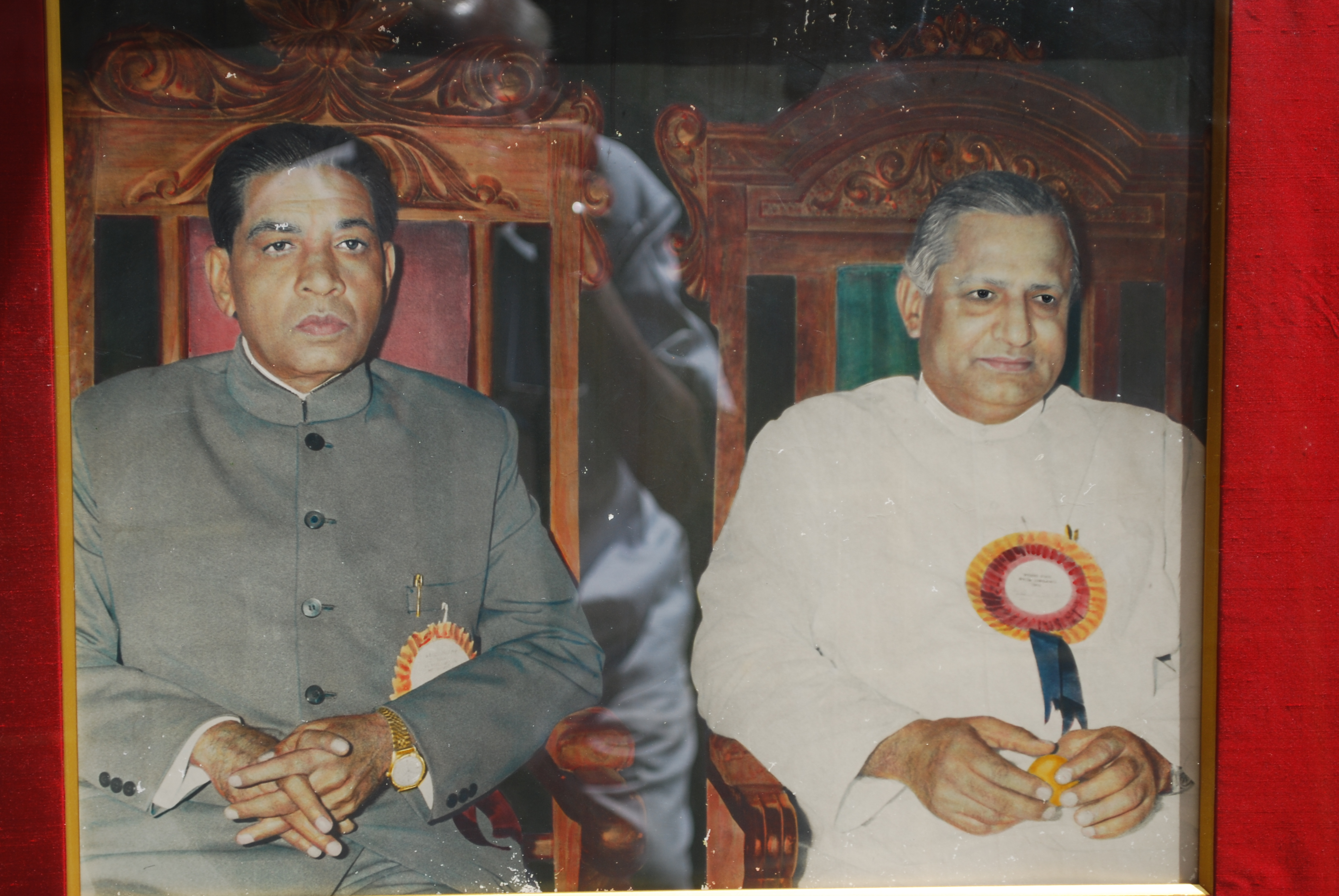
- D. Devaraj Urs; Chief Minister of Mysore
- Date formed: 20 March 1972
- Date dissolved: 31 December 1977

People and organisations
- Head of state: Mohanlal Sukhadia (1 February 1972 – 10 January 1975); Uma Shankar Dikshit (10 January 1975 – 2 August 1977); Govind Narain (2 August 1977 – 15 April 1982)
- Head of government: D. Devaraj Urs
- Member parties: Indian National Congress
- Status in legislature: Majority
- Opposition party: Indian National Congress (Organisation); UOP
- Opposition leader: H. D. Deve Gowda; H. T. Krishnappa; H. D. Deve Gowda(assembly)

History
- Election: 1972
- Outgoing election: 1978
- Legislature terms: 6 years (Council); 5 years (Assembly)
- Predecessor: First Veerendra Patil ministry
- Successor: Second Urs ministry

D. Devaraj Urs Ministry was the Council of Ministers in Mysore, a state in South India headed by D. Devaraj Urs of the Indian National Congress.

The ministry had multiple ministers including the Chief Minister. All ministers belonged to the Indian National Congress.

D. Devaraj Urs became Chief minister of Mysore after Indian National Congress emerged victorious 1972 Mysore elections.

== Chief Minister & Cabinet Ministers ==
S.No	Name	MLA/MLC	Constituency	Designation	Portfolio	Party		Term of Office	
Chief Minister
1.	D. Devaraj Urs	MLA	Hunasuru	Chief Minister	Other departments not allocated to any Minister		INC	20 March 1972	31 December 1977
Cabinet Minister
2.	M. Y. Ghorpade	MLA	Sandur	Cabinet Minister	Finance		INC	20 March 1972	31 December 1977
3.	S. M. Krishna	MLC	MLAs	Cabinet Minister	Industries; Parliamentary Affairs		INC	20 March 1972	31 December 1977
4.	H. N. Nanje Gowda	MLA	Arkalgud	Cabinet Minister	Irrigation		INC	20 March 1972	31 December 1977
5.	V. L. Patil	MLA	Raibag	Cabinet Minister	Horticulture; Social Welfare		INC	20 March 1972	31 December 1977
6.	R. Gundu Rao	MLA	Somwarpet	Cabinet Minister	Transport		INC	1975	31 December 1977
5	Revenue	B. Basavalingappa		Uttarahalli	20 March 1972	1973	Indian National Congress		
5	Revenue	N. Huchmasthy Gowda		Huliyurdurga	1973	31 December 1977	Indian National Congress		
6	Housing?; Urban development?	B. Basavalingappa		Uttarahalli	1973	31 December 1977	Indian National Congress		
8	Forest	K. H. Patil		Gadag	20 March 1972	31 December 1977	Indian National Congress		

== Minister of State ==
S.No	Portfolio	Name	Portrait	Constituency	Term of Office		Party
1	Information; Sports; Youth Services	R. Gundu Rao		Somwarpet	20 March 1972	1975	Indian National Congress
2	Home	Sarekoppa Bangarappa		Sorab	20 March 1972	31 December 1977	Indian National Congress
3	Small scale Industries	Veerappa Moily		Karkal	20 March 1972	31 December 1977	Indian National Congress
4	.	H. C. Srikantaiah		Shravanabelagola	20 March 1972	31 December 1977	Indian National Congress

== See also ==
- Mysore Legislative Assembly
- Mysore Legislative Council
- Politics of Mysore
