= C. N. Balakrishna =

Indian politician

Member of Karnataka Legislative Assembly
- Incumbent
- Assumed office 8 May 2013
- Preceded by: C. S. Putte Gowda
- Constituency: Shravanabelagola

Personal details
- Born: Cholenahalli Nanjappa Balakrishna; 7 April 1969 (age 57) Cholenahalli, Channarayapatna Taluk, Hassan district, Karnataka, India
- Party: Janata Dal (Secular)
- Parent(s): Nanjappa Gowda and Shambhamma
- Relatives: C. N. Manjunath (Brother)
- Occupation: Politician

Cholenahalli Nanjappa Balakrishna (born 7 April 1969) is an Indian politician from Karnataka. He won the 2023 Karnataka Legislative Assembly Election on Janata Dal (S) ticket from Shravanabelagola constituency in Hassan district. He defeated M.A. Gopalaswamy of the Congress party by a margin of 6,645 votes. He won the Shravanabelagola seat for the third time.

== Early life and education ==
His late father, Nanjappa, was a farmer. He is a graduate.

== Career ==
Balakrishna first became an MLA from Shravanabelagola in 2013 on JD(S) ticket defeating C. S. Putte Gowda by 24,142 votes. He won again in the 2018 Karnataka Legislative Assembly Election defeating the same opponent by 53,012 votes. He won for the third time in 2023 elections defeating M. A. Gopalaswamy of Congress by 6,645 votes.
