= K. Venkatagiri Gowda =

Indian politician

Member of Parliament, Lok Sabha
- In office 1991–1996
- Preceded by: R. Gundu Rao
- Succeeded by: Ananth Kumar
- Constituency: Bangalore South

Personal details
- Born: 26 June 1923 Byrapatna, Karnataka
- Died: 5 July 2004 (aged 81) Bangalore, Karnataka
- Party: Bharatiya Janata Party
- Spouse: Savithramma
- Education: M.A. Mysore University, Ph.D. London University

K. Venkatagiri Gowda (1923-2004) was an Indian economist and politician from Bharatiya Janata Party. He was the member of 10th Lok Sabha from Bangalore South. Gowda defeated the incumbent MP and former Chief Minister of Karnataka R. Gundu Rao and thus BJP won the elections for the 1st time in Bangalore South.

== Personal life ==
Gowda was born on 26 June 1923 at Byrapatna in Bangalore district of Karnataka. He obtained his doctorate in monetary economics from the London School of Economics in 1956.

- Father's Name: Shri Krishnadase Gowda
- Marital Status: Married on 11 June 1951
- Spouse's Name: Smt. Savithramma
- Educational Qualifications: M.A. from Mysore University, PhD from London School of Economics.

== Political career ==
In 1991, Gowda was elected to the Lok Sabha as the BJP candidate defeating the former Chief Minister R. Gundu Rao of the Congress. Thus BJP won the elections for the 1st time in Bangalore South. He was the member of 10th Lok Sabha from Bangalore South. But he fell out with the BJP leadership and openly admired the prime ministership of P.V. Narasimha Rao and the economic policies of the Prime Minister, Manmohan Singh. Soon after being elected as the MP from BJP, he left the party.

He was an anti-corruption activist.

== Political beliefs ==
He wanted "Perestroika and Glasnost for India". He tried to enter politics after his retirement from Bangalore University. He admired Congress as a party with a secular history. But the nationalistic fervour and RSS discipline of BJP impressed him a lot.

He felt that one owes his duties to his own community. So, he was always an active participant in the activities of Vokkaligara Sangha and was one of the two leaders in the Sangha politics. Towards his last days, he was made the President of this Sangha of the leading and contributing Vokkaliga community of Karnataka. He believed and often said that "Caste is one of the greatest ills of India".

A Scheduled Caste lady was his foster mother as she fed him throughout infancy and he honoured her by inviting her every year and giving her a sari, as long as she was alive.

Professor Madaiah, two times Vice-Chancellor of Mysore University often communicated with him and was seen on many of his celebrations. Professor Venugopal K R Vice-Chancellor Bangalore University (2018-2022) was instrumental in setting up Dr Venkatagiri Gowda Auditorium at Jnana Bharathi, BU who obtained his PhD in International Economics - Petrodollar and the World Economy under his guidance in 1989 and was his favourite student. Dr Rekha Jagannath Member at Karnataka State Planning Board Bengaluru, Karnataka, India was one of his very favourite students.

He wanted to establish a chair in his name, in Corruption Studies or Monetary Economics, which he taught at the London School of Economics.

Some of the budget speeches of Finance Ministers of Karnataka were framed by him. At least one of the Finance Ministers of India had his budget speeches with some parts influenced by Gowda.

== Works ==
His book on "Petro Dollars" accumulated by the oil-rich Arab countries in the mid-Seventies was widely acclaimed in India and abroad.

- Fiscal Revolution in India: A Macro Economic Analysis of Long Term Fiscal Policy.
- Appreciation of the Indian rupee: A study in the international monetary mechanism.
- International Currency Plans and Expansion of World Trade.
- Fiscal policy and inflation in post-war India, 1945 – 54
- Eurodollar Flows and International Monetary Stability.
- International currency plans: and expansion of world trade
- Perestroika and glasnost for India: new strategy for India and the Third World 'Inflation—Appreciation of the Indian Rupee'
- Commonwealth Common Market, a proposal
- New dimension for Indian planning
- The European Common Market and India
