= Koshy's =

Restaurant in Bangalore, India

Koshy’s Parade Café
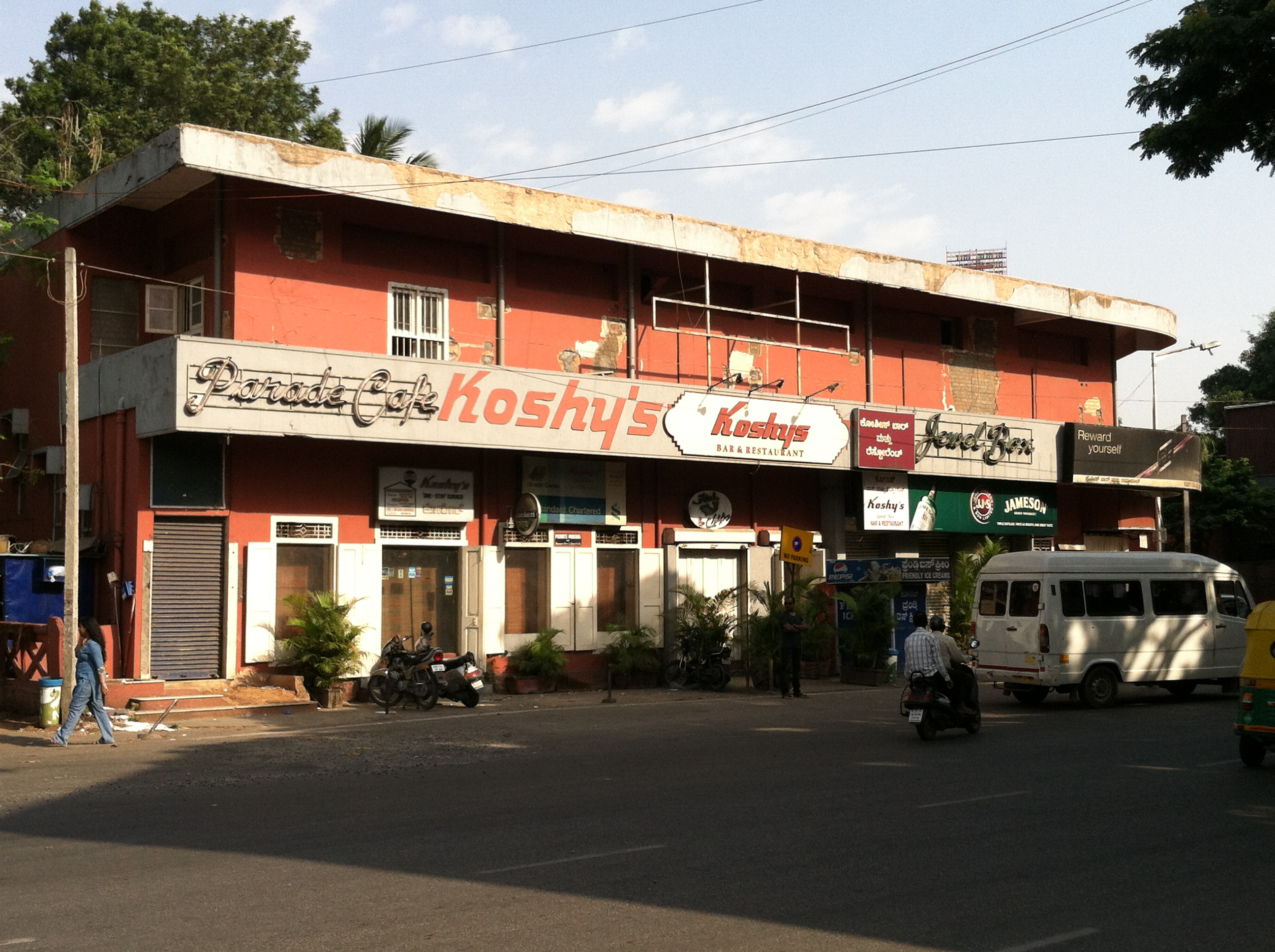
- Taken in 2012 - Koshy's Cafe - Bangalore, India - taken from St. Mark's Road

- Location in Karnataka, India Koshy's (India)

Restaurant information
- Established: 1940
- Location: 39, St. Mark's Road, Shanthala Nagar, Ashok Nagar, Bangalore, Karnataka, 560001, India
- Coordinates: 12.976833604849636°N 77.60158093068758°E

Koshy's Parade Café, popularly known as Koshy's, is a family-owned restaurant in Bangalore, India.

Jawaharlal Nehru, Queen Elizabeth II and Nikita Khruschev are among those who have dined at Koshy's.

== History ==
Koshy’s started off as a bakery in 1940, set up by P.O. Koshy, a Syrian Christian from Kerala. In 1952, the restaurant was built next to the bakery. After the death of P.O. Koshy, his sons took over the establishment. Since the 1990s, third generation Koshys, Prem and Santosh, have managed the eatery.

The colonial-era restaurant has maintained its old-world decor which is a draw for its clientele. The interior consists of wooden chairs, tables, creaky fans, antique mirrors and shuttered windows.

Koshy's regulars include journalists, writers, literati and intellectuals.

Gundu Rao, erstwhile Chief Minister of Karnataka, once described Koshy's to Prem Koshy as follows.

“I have met your grandfather and father and seen you as a kid. I have travelled across the globe looking for peace and quiet and this is the only place I find it.”

Ramachandra Guha — historian, environmentalist, writer and public intellectual — has described Koshy's as follows.

"As one grows older one has fewer wishes and hopes for oneself. One of mine is this; that I may die before my favourite café does. I can probably (just about) live without music, cricket, and even books, but life without Parade’s is impossible to contemplate."

== Food ==
Koshy’s menu has about thousand dishes. They include roast chicken, Kerala pork, fish biryani, cutlets, chicken puffs, steak, apam and stew, and potato smileys (french fries shaped like smiling faces). Koshy's also serves filter coffee and Danish pastries.
