= P. M. Narendraswamy =

Indian politician (born 1963)

Minister of Agriculture, Karnataka
- Incumbent
- Assumed office 12 August 2026
- Governor: Thawar Chand Gehlot; Sudha Yadav
- Chief Minister: D. K. Shivakumar

Member of the Karnataka Legislative Assembly
- Incumbent
- Assumed office 2023
- Preceded by: K. Annadani
- Constituency: Malavalli

Personal details
- Born: 13 April 1963 (age 63)
- Party: Indian National Congress
- Education: B.E. Civil

P. M. Narendraswamy (born 13 April 1963) is an Indian politician serving as the Minister of Agriculture in the Government of Karnataka since August 2026. A member of the Indian National Congress, he represents the Malavalli Assembly constituency in Mandya district in the Karnataka Legislative Assembly. He has been elected to the Legislative Assembly three times, in 2008, 2013 and 2023.

== Early life and education ==
Narendraswamy is from Malavalli in Mandya district, Karnataka. His father is P. L. Mallanna. He completed his Bachelor of Engineering (BE) in Civil Engineering from Ambedkar Institute of Technology, Bengaluru.

== Political Career ==
Narendraswamy began his electoral career by contesting the 1999 Karnataka Legislative Assembly election from Malavalli Assembly constituency as a candidate of the Indian National Congress. He secured 22,054 votes but lost to B. Somashekar of the Janata Dal (United) by a margin of 5,281 votes. In the 2004 Assembly election, he again contested from the same seat on a Congress ticket, securing 27,630 votes and losing to K. Annadani of the Janata Dal (Secular) by 11,230 votes.

He was first elected to the Karnataka Legislative Assembly from Malavalli in the 2008 Karnataka Legislative Assembly election as an independent candidate, defeating K. Annadani of the JD(S) by a margin of 11,919 votes.

Following his election, he joined the B. S. Yediyurappa-led Karnataka Government as Minister for Women and Child Development in June 2008. During a Cabinet reshuffle in September 2010, he was assigned the Animal Husbandry portfolio. His tenure as a minister ended in October 2010.

In the 2013 Karnataka Legislative Assembly election, he was re-elected from Malavalli as a candidate of the Congress , defeating K. Annadani by a margin of 538 votes. He lost the constituency to Annadani in the 2018 Assembly election.

Narendraswamy returned to the Karnataka Legislative Assembly in the 2023 election, securing 1,06,498 votes and defeating K. Annadani of the JD(S) by a margin of 46,846 votes.

On 5 February 2025, he was appointed chairman of the Karnataka State Pollution Control Board (KSPCB).

On 3 August 2026, Narendraswamy sworn in as a Cabinet minister in the Government of Karnataka under Chief Minister D. K. Shivakumar. On 12 August, he was allocated the Agriculture portfolio, succeeding N. Chaluvaraya Swamy.
