= Channarayapatna taluk =

Channarayapatna Taluk
- Taluk
- Location in Karnataka, India
- Coordinates: 12.904165°N 76.389281°E
- Country: India
- State: Karnataka
- District: Hassan
- Regions of Karnataka: Bayaluseeme

Government
  - Type: Taluk Panchayat
  - Body: Channarayapatna Taluka Panchayat (Taluka Administration)
  - Tehsildar & Taluka Magistrate: Naveen Kumar V S

Languages
  - Official: Kannada
- Time zone: UTC+5:30 (IST)
- PIN: 5731xx
- Vehicle registration: KA-13
- Website: channarayapatna.kar.nic.in

Channarayapatna Taluk is one of the eight taluks of Hassan District, Karnataka, India. Channarayapatna town, being the taluka headquarters, lies on the Mangalore - Bangalore National highway 75 in Karnataka, India. Its popularity can be attributed to its historical and religious significant, coconut farming, sugar and also to its fields of literature, culture, religion etc. Now it is growing predominantly towards improvements in the modern era. The Taluk Office, Channarayapatna is located off the Bangalore-Mangalore highway in Channarayapatna town. The office is housed in the royal and majestic Mini Vidhana Soudha. In addition to the Taluka office, it also houses the Sub-Registrar office, Sub-Treasury office & Labour Inspector offices. The Taluk Office is headed by the Tahsildar who is of KAS cadre. They include Shirastedars, Deputy Tahsildars, Revenue Inspectors, FDAs, SDAs & Village Accountants. The Tahsildar also heads survey section which has survey supervisors, surveyors, Band Jawans, Licensed Surveyors besides managing food & civil supplies section, which includes Food Shirastedars and Food Inspectors. The Tahsildar has to manage the Muzrai section to take care of Muzrai temples. In addition to conventional revenue duties, the Tahsildar has to perform magisterial functions as provided in the CrPC. The Tahsildar also has many other functions related to election, disaster management, SC/ST, Backward classes, women, children welfare etc. Overall, they will be responsible for the peace and tranquillity of the taluk. Channarayapatna has an average elevation of 827 metres (2713 ft). There are 40 panchayat villages in Channarayapatna Taluk, for 407 villages.

== Economy ==
Agriculture is Channarayapatna's major economic activity. Sugarcane & coconuts are the leading commercial crops, while food crops include ragi, potatoes, sunflowers, and rice. The taluk also has mineral reserves, such as chromite reserves.

== Demographics ==
As of the 2011 India census, Channarayapatna has a population of 279,798 people. Males constitute 51% of the population and females constitute 49% of the population. Channarayapatna has an average literacy rate of 73%, higher than the national average of 59.5%, with male literacy of 78% and female literacy of 68%. 11% of the population is under 6 years of age.

== Gallery ==
Map of Channarayapatna Taluk as per the 2001 Census

Map of Channarayapatna Taluk as per the 2001 Census

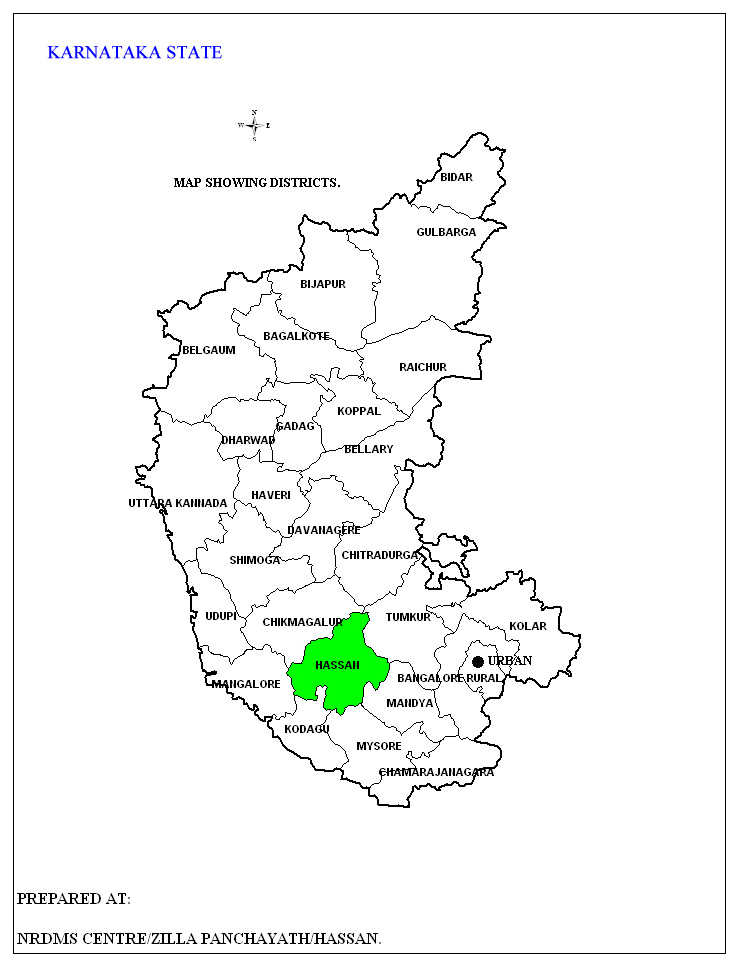
Positioning of Hassan district in Karnataka

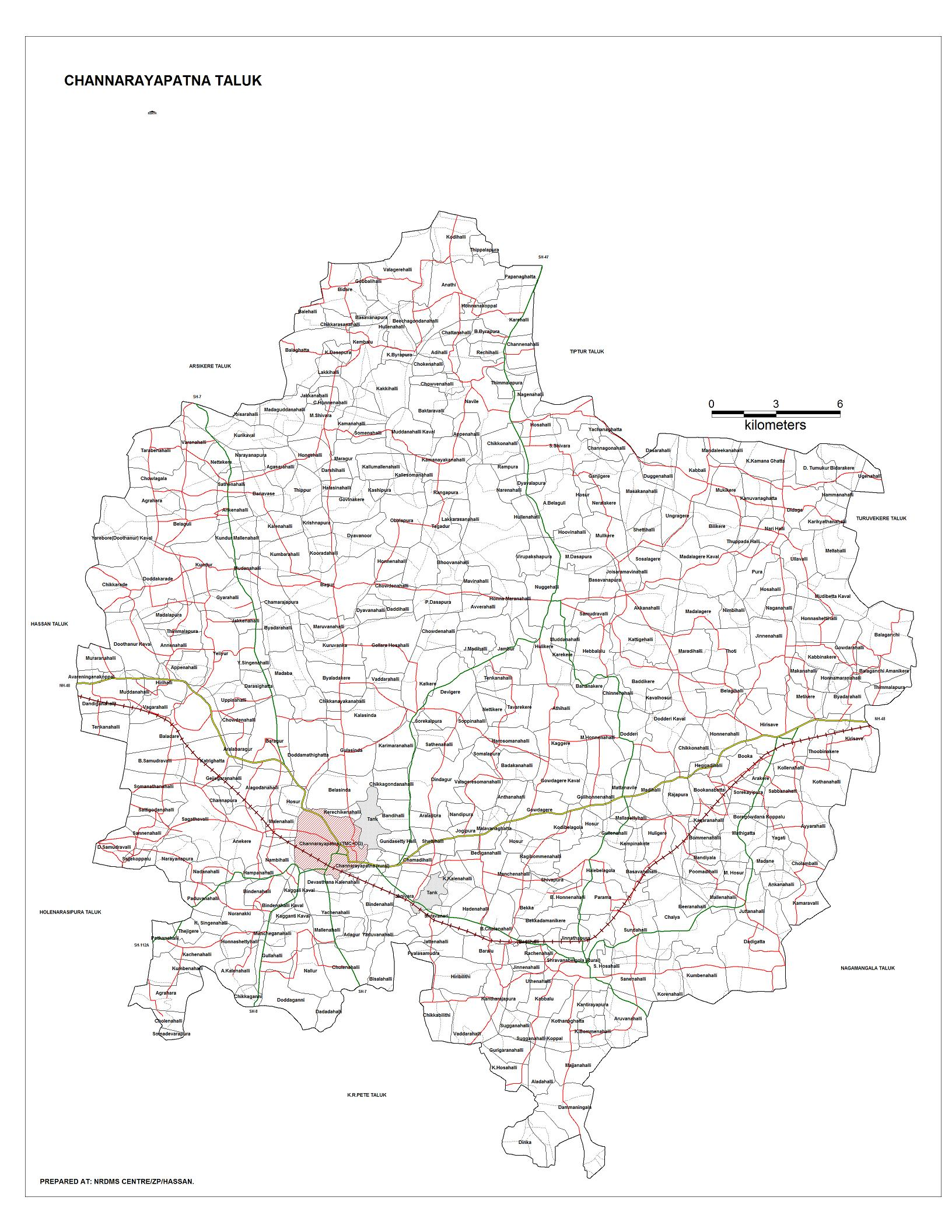
Village map of Channarayapatna Taluk

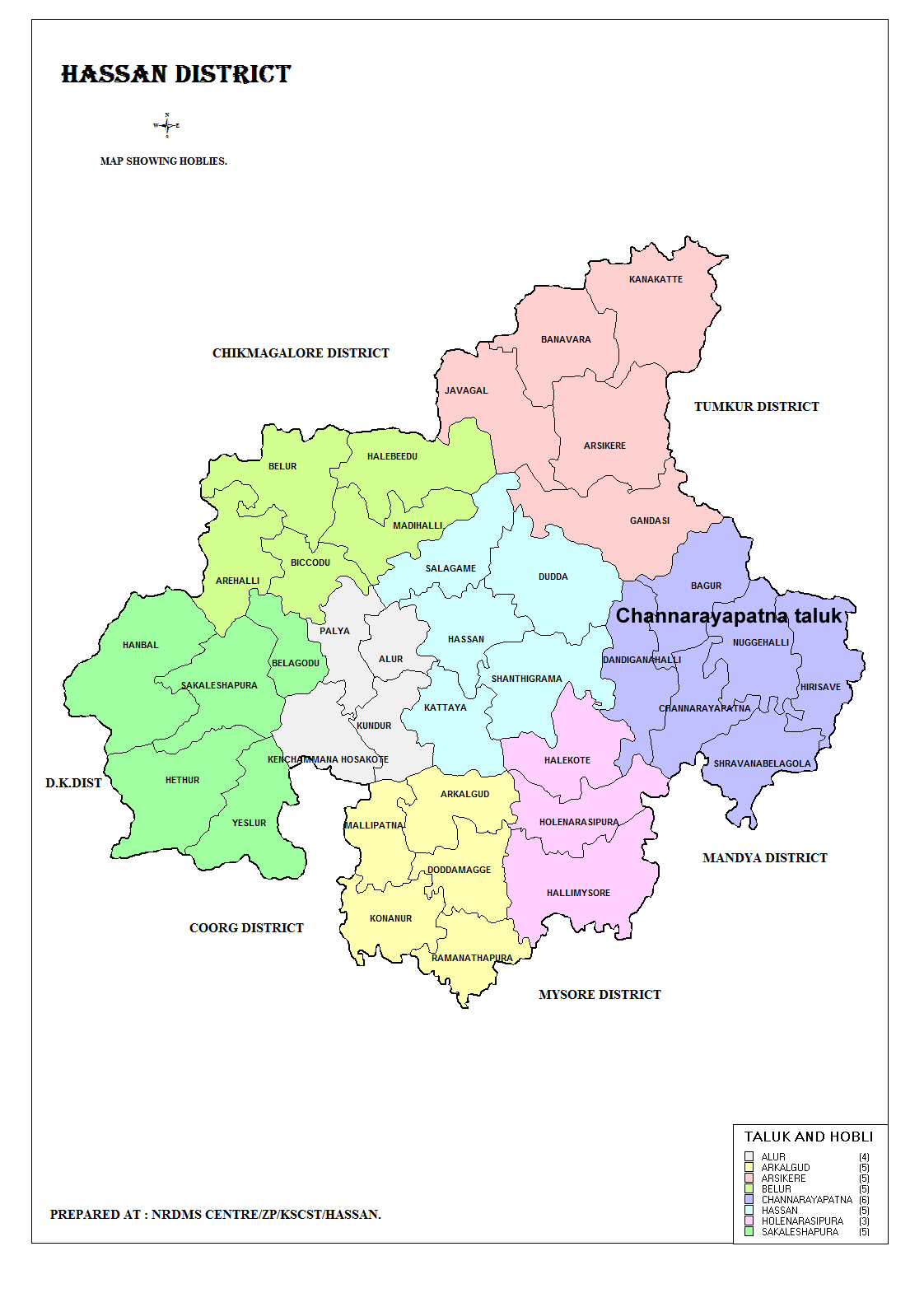
Hobli Map of Hassan district

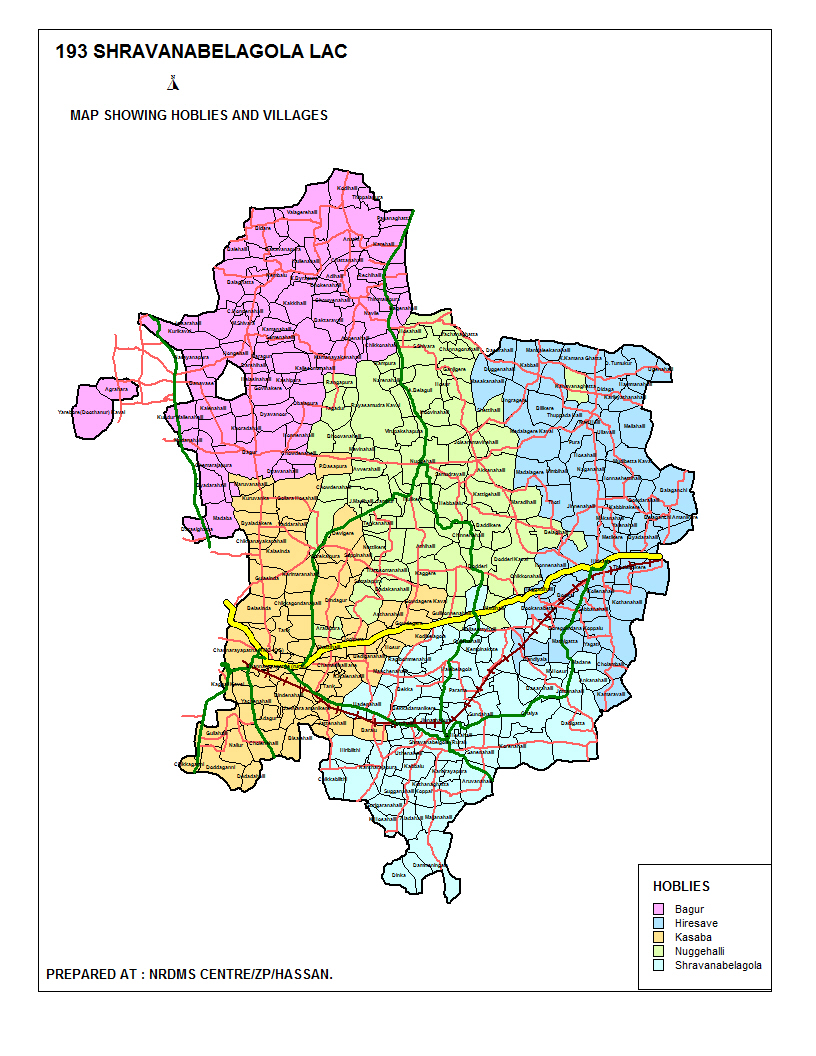
Hobli & Village map of Shravanabelagola Assembly constituency, Channarayapatna Taluk

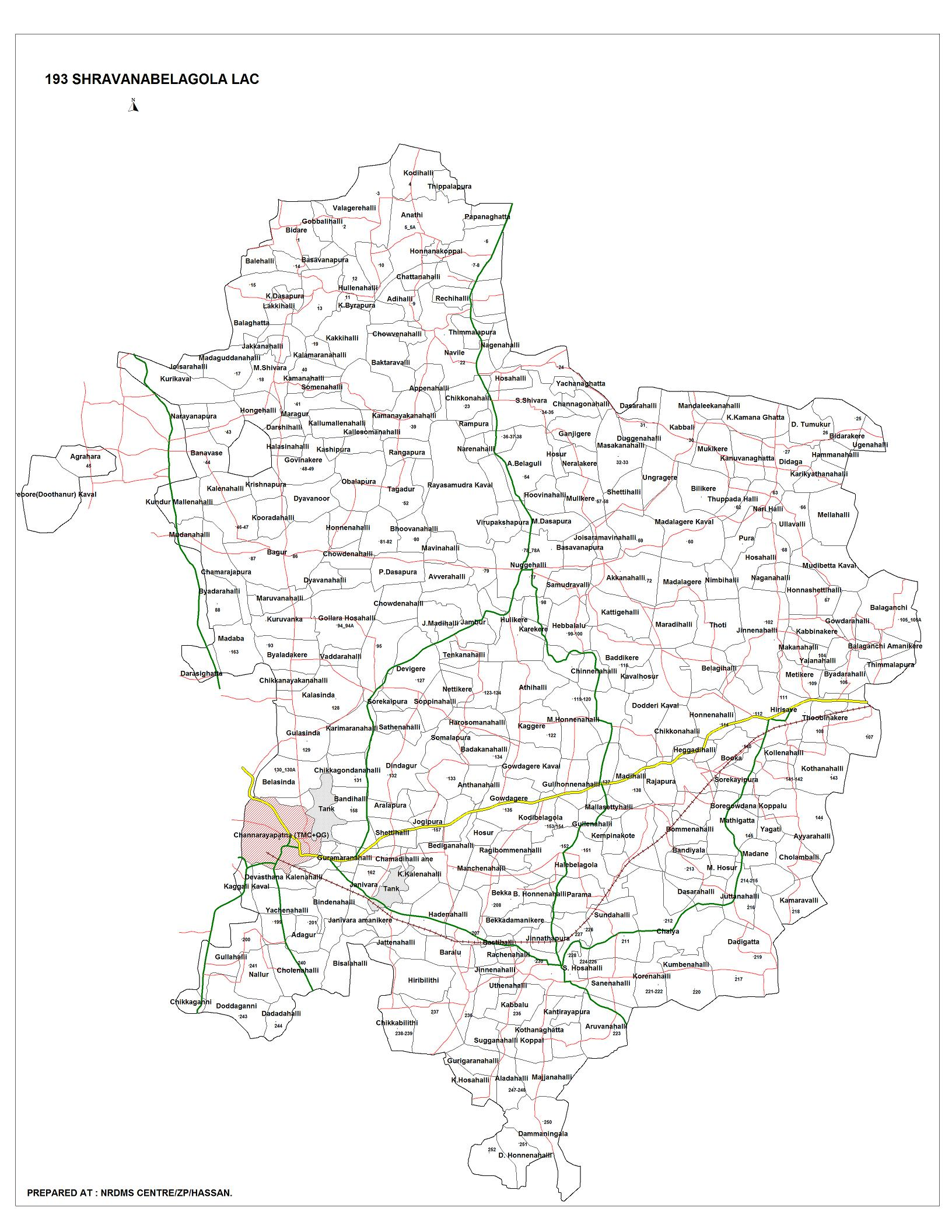
Village map of Shravanabelagola Assembly constituency, Channarayapatna Taluk

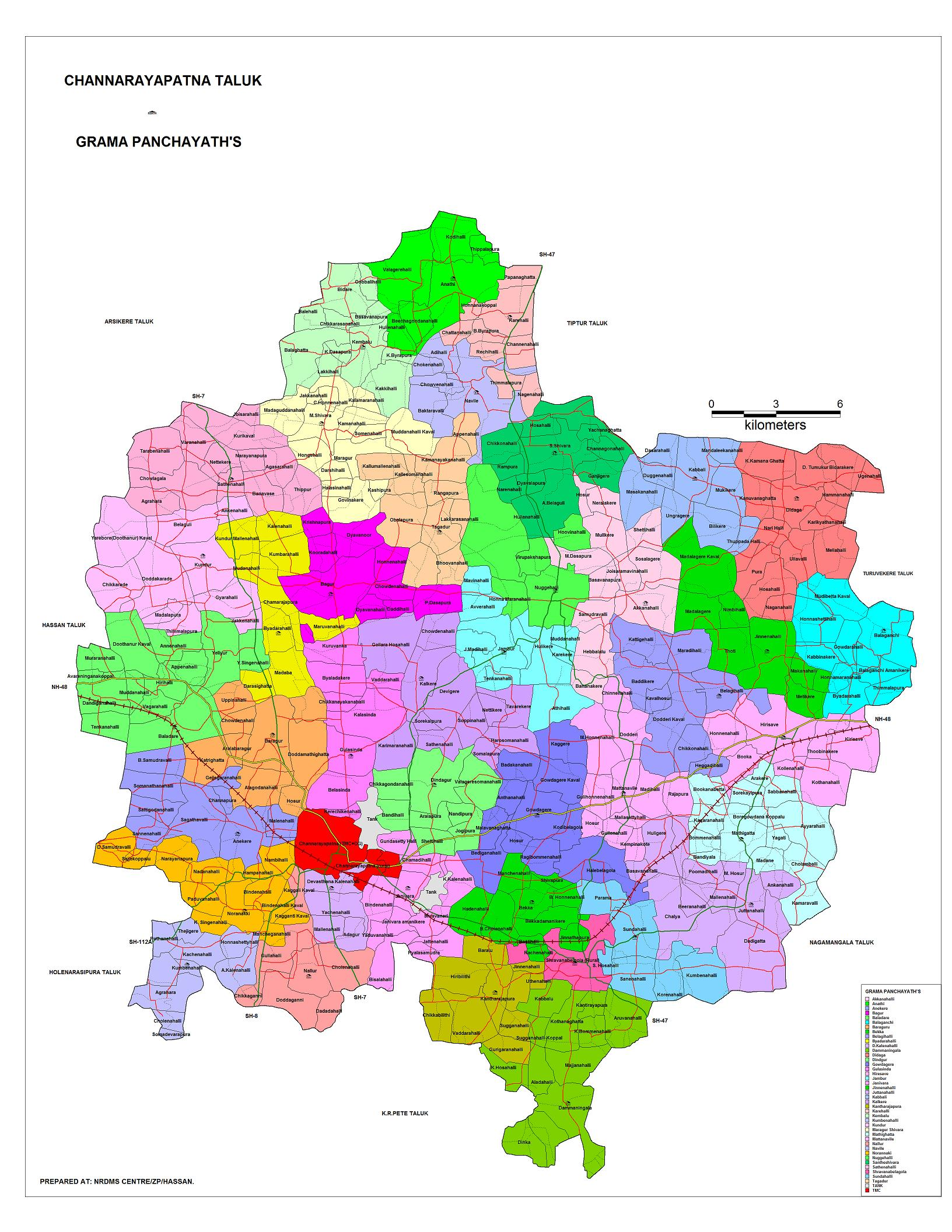
Grama panchayat and Village map of Channarayapatna Taluk

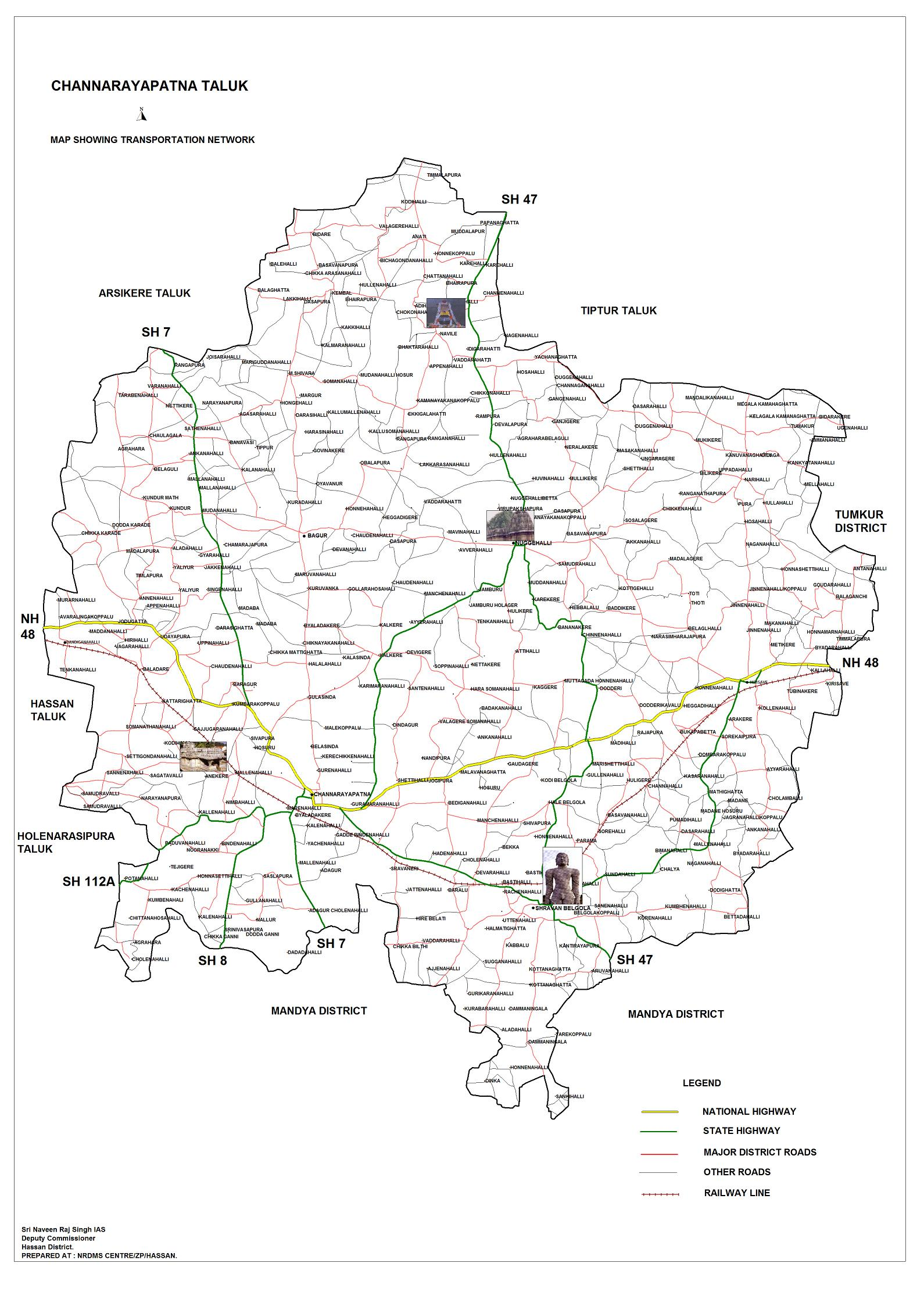
Tourism map of Channarayapatna Taluk

Channarayapatna Taluk - Hobli and Village map

Channarayapatna Taluk - Grama Panchayat and Village map

Channarayapatna Taluk map about the fluoride content in DWS

== People from Channarayapatna ==
- H. C. Srikantaiah, Former Minister and Member of Parliament
- Dr. N B Nanjappa, Former Member of legislative Assembly
- S. L. Bhyrappa, novelist and professor
- Nanditha, playback singer
- C. N. Manjunath, cardiologist and MP of Bengaluru Rural
- Nagaraj Kote, actor in Kannada Movies
