= G. Made Gowda =

Indian politician (1928–2021)

Minister of Forest, Government of Karnataka
- In office 1980–1983

Minister Mines and Geology, Government of Karnataka
- In office 1981-1983

Member of Parliament, Lok Sabha
- In office 1989–1996
- Preceded by: K. V. Shankaragowda
- Succeeded by: Krishna
- Constituency: Mandya

Member of Legislative Assembly
- In office 1967–1989
- Preceded by: M. Mallikarjunaswamy
- Succeeded by: K. M. Puttu
- Constituency: Kirugavalu

Member of Legislative Assembly
- In office 1962–1967
- Preceded by: H. V. Veeregowda
- Succeeded by: M. Mallikarjunaswamy
- Constituency: Malavalli

Personal details
- Born: 1928 Gurudevarahalli, Mysore district, Kingdom of Mysore, British India (Now Mandya district, Karnataka)
- Died: 17 July 2021 (aged 92/93 years) K. M. Doddi, Mandya district, Karnataka, India
- Party: Indian National Congress (Till 1971, 1982–2021)
- Other political affiliations: Indian National Congress (Organization) (1971-1977); Janata Party (1977-1982)
- Spouse(s): J. P. Padmamma (April, 1958 - 18 July 2021, his death)
- Children: Two sons and two daughters
- Education: Bachelor of Arts, Bachelor of Law
- Alma mater: Maharaja's College, Mysore; Government Law College, Bangalore (Affiliated to Mysore University)
- Occupation: Politician
- Profession: Agriculturist, Lawyer, Political and Social Worker

Gurudevarahalli Madegowda popularly known as G. Made Gowda (1928 – 17 July 2021) was an Indian freedom fighter, politician and also an activist. He was former Member of Parliament and a Cabinet Minister in the state of Karnataka.

== Personal life ==
Hailing from an agricultural family, he was born in 1928 at Gurudevarahalli in Mysore district of Kingdom of Mysore during British India. He graduated with Bachelor of Arts from Maharaja's College, Mysore and later he studied Bachelor of Laws at Government Law College, Bangalore (Affiliated to Mysore University). He was inspired by Mahatma Gandhi and Gowda took part in the freedom struggle and was also imprisoned for various periods between 1942 and 1947. His participation in the freedom movement laid the foundation for his political life. He was married to J P Padma. They have two daughters and two sons. His son Madhu G Madegowda is also involved in active politics. He served as a Member of Karnataka Legislative Council (MLC). Madhu G Madegowda unsuccessfully contested the 2018 Karnataka Legislative Assembly election.

== Political life ==
Rising in politics, he became member of the Maddur Taluk Board. He was elected to Mysore Legislative Assembly in 1962 from Malavalli, Mandya district. When his seat (Malavalli) was reserved to Schedule Caste, he won Legislative Assembly elections from Kirugavalu in 1967, 1972, 1978, 1983 and 1985 and went on to become the Minister of State in R. Gundu Rao ministry in 1980 in charge of Forest Ministry. He was elevated to Cabinet Rank in 1981 and handled Mines and Geology department as an additional responsibility along with Forest Portfolio and he remained in the post till 1983. He became the Member of Parliament from Mandya constituency in 1989 and also won in subsequent election from the same constituency in 1991.

== Cauvery agitation ==
He came to limelight during Cauvery agitation for nearly four decades in Mandya district. In 1994, when then Prime Minister P. V. Narasimha Rao directed the state to release Cauvery water to Tamil Nadu, Madegowda tendered his resignation as an MP and took part in the agitation.

His role in convincing then chief minister S. Bangarappa in bringing an ordinance to overcome the interim award of Cauvery Dispute Tribunal (CWDT), is considered to be a heroic achievement of Madegowda by thousands of farmers and his admirers. When Cauvery Water Dispute Tribunal (CWDT) passed the final award in 2007, he was instrumental in holding the Cauvery agitation for more than 100 days in Mandya district and could be seen sitting at Silver Jubilee Park in Mandya throughout the agitation.

== Controversy ==
An audio clip alleged to contain a conversation between Madegowda and then Mandya district in-charge minister C. S. Puttaraju of JD(S) became popular on 7 April 2019. As per the clip, Madegowda is heard seeking money from Puttaraju for meeting the poll expenses as people are demanding money. At the same time, his son Madhu was campaigning for Nikhil in Mandya during 2019 Indian general elections and Madegowda tells that he has spoken to Madhu regarding the same. Later both Puttaraju and Madegowda admitted to the conversation and denied anything wrong with the same. In the clip, he also reminds Puttaraju that one group in Maddur, which falls in Mandya (Lok Sabha constituency) belongs to them and other belonging to then Transport minister D. C. Thammanna who happens to be the MLA of Maddur has already made monetary arrangements. Post revelation of the Controversy, Puttaraju accused Union Government and Income Tax Department of tapping his phone at the cost of making electoral dividends to Independent candidate Sumalatha Ambareesh who was supported by Narendra Modi led National Democratic Alliance. Reiterating Puttaraju's claims Madegowda claimed that even Prime Minister Narendra Modi cannot take part in election affairs without money and tried clarifying that they needed money just to meet the expenses incurred towards food and day to day outlay. Then chief minister H. D. Kumaraswamy justified the demand by saying that seeking money for poll expenses was not against rules and there is a provision in the law for it. An FIR was registered under Section 171E of IPC against Puttaraju and Madegowda based on leaked audio tape. This episode dented his image built over years.

== Death ==
He was suffering from lung ailments and was admitted to the Hospital in Bangalore on 20 Jun 2021 and later shifted to a Multi specialty Hospital in K. M. Doddi, Mandya district. He died on 17 July 2021 due to age related issues.

== Positions held ==
- Member, Taluk Board, Maddur Taluk, Mandya district
- President, MySugar Factory, Mandya
- President, DCC, Mandya, Karnataka
- Executive Member, PCC, Karnataka
- 1962–89: Member, Karnataka Legislative Assembly
- 1977-79: Member, Public Accounts Committee, Karnataka Legislature
- 1980-81: Minister of State, Forest in R. Gundu Rao ministry
- 1981-83: Cabinet Minister, Forest and Mines & Geology in R. Gundu Rao ministry
- 1989–96: Elected to Lok Sabha (Eleventh) from Mandya (2 Terms)
- 1990: Member, Committee on Papers Laid on the Table, Lok Sabha
- September 1990: Member, Consultative Committee, Ministry of Textiles, Lok Sabha
