= Karnataka Kranti Ranga =

- Founder: Devaraj Urs
- Founded: 1979
- Dissolved: 1990
- Split from: Indian National Congress
- Merged into: Indian National Congress

Karnataka Kranti Ranga (Karnataka Revolutionary Front), also known as the Kannada Kranti Ranga was a regional political party in Karnataka, India, from 1979 to 1990. KKR was formed by Devaraj Urs in 1979, as a split from the Indian National Congress. It subsequently became part of what was called the Congress (Urs) and finally merged with the Janata Party.

In 1983, KKR was "floated" by Sarekoppa Bangarappa, but merged with Congress before the 1989 Karnataka Assembly elections.
