= Malavalli Assembly constituency =

Legislative Assembly constituency in Karnataka, India

Coordinates: 12.38°N 77.06°E

Malavalli
- Constituency No. 186 for the Karnataka Legislative Assembly

Constituency details
- Country: India
- Region: South India
- State: Karnataka
- District: Mandya
- Lok Sabha constituency: Mandya
- Established: 1951
- Total electors: 248,577 (2023)
- Reservation: SC

Member of Legislative Assembly
- 16th Karnataka Legislative Assembly
- Incumbent P. M. Narendraswamy
- Party: Indian National Congress
- Elected year: 2023
- Preceded by: K. Annadani

Malavalli Assembly constituency is one of the 224 constituencies in the Karnataka Legislative Assembly of Karnataka, a southern state of India. It is also part of Mandya Lok Sabha constituency.

P. M. Narendraswamy is the current MLA from this constituency.

== Members of the Legislative Assembly ==
Election	Member	Party
1952	B. P. Nagaraja Murthy	Kisan Mazdoor Praja Party
1952	M. Chikkalingaiah	Scheduled Castes Federation
1957	H. V. Veeregowda	Indian National Congress
1957	M. Malikarjnna Swamy	Indian National Congress
1962	G. Made Gowda	Indian National Congress
1967	M. Malikarjnna Swamy	Indian National Congress
1972	M. Malikarjnna Swamy	Indian National Congress
1978	K. L. Mariswami	Janata Party
1983	B. Somasekhar	Janata Party
1985	B. Somasekhar	Janata Party
1989	Mallajamma	Indian National Congress
1994	B. Somashekar	Janata Dal
1999	B. Somashekar	Janata Dal
2004	Dr. K. Annadani	Janata Dal
2008	P. M. Narendraswamy	Independent politician
2013	P. M. Narendraswamy	Indian National Congress
2018	Dr. K. Annadani	Janata Dal
2023	P. M. Narendraswamy	Indian National Congress

== Election results ==
=== Assembly Election 2023 ===
2023 Karnataka Legislative Assembly election : Malavalli
Party	Candidate	Votes	%	±%
INC	P. M. Narendraswamy	106,498	53.79%	▲14.61
JD(S)	Dr. K. Annadani	59,652	30.13%	▼22.80
BJP	G. Muniraju	25,116	12.69%	▲7.14
BSP	M. Krishnamurthy	2,277	1.15%	New
NOTA	None of the above	1,256	0.63%	▼0.13
Margin of victory		46,846	23.66%	▲9.91
Turnout		198,122	79.70%	▼1.87
Total valid votes		197,983		
Registered electors		248,577		▲4.10
INC gain from JD(S)		Swing	▲0.86	

=== Assembly Election 2018 ===
2018 Karnataka Legislative Assembly election : Malavalli
Party	Candidate	Votes	%	±%
JD(S)	Dr. K. Annadani	103,038	52.93%	▲13.68
INC	P. M. Narendraswamy	76,278	39.18%	▼0.41
BJP	B. Somashekar	10,808	5.55%	▲4.46
NOTA	None of the above	1,471	0.76%	New
Margin of victory		26,760	13.75%	▲13.41
Turnout		194,773	81.57%	▲6.67
Total valid votes		194,675		
Registered electors		238,777		▲3.58
JD(S) gain from INC		Swing	▲13.34	

=== Assembly Election 2013 ===
2013 Karnataka Legislative Assembly election : Malavalli
Party	Candidate	Votes	%	±%
INC	P. M. Narendraswamy	61,869	39.59%	▲34.71
JD(S)	Dr. K. Annadani	61,331	39.25%	▲16.11
KJP	G. Muniraju	26,397	16.89%	New
BSRCP	Dr. Murthy. L	8,018	5.13%	New
JD(U)	B. Somashekar	3,914	2.50%	▼3.78
BSP	M. Krishnamurthy	2,628	1.68%	▼5.26
Independent	S. Swamy	2,031	1.30%	New
CPI(M)	K. Basavaraju	1,868	1.20%	New
BJP	D. N. Kumara Swamy	1,697	1.09%	▼19.13
Margin of victory		538	0.34%	▼7.92
Turnout		172,662	74.90%	▲6.07
Total valid votes		156,272		
Registered electors		230,524		▲9.99
INC gain from Independent		Swing	▲8.19	

=== Assembly Election 2008 ===
2008 Karnataka Legislative Assembly election : Malavalli
Party	Candidate	Votes	%	±%
Independent	P. M. Narendraswamy	45,288	31.40%	New
JD(S)	Dr. K. Annadani	33,369	23.14%	▼15.54
BJP	Mahadevaiah	29,158	20.22%	New
BSP	M. Prasanna	10,014	6.94%	▼0.73
JD(U)	B. Somashekar	9,062	6.28%	▼15.06
INC	Y. S. Siddaraju	7,044	4.88%	▼22.62
Independent	B. M. Mahendrakumar	2,833	1.96%	New
Independent	H. G. Somashekar	2,616	1.81%	New
Independent	R. M. Nanjundaswamy	1,028	0.71%	New
Margin of victory		11,919	8.26%	▼2.92
Turnout		144,261	68.83%	▲3.66
Total valid votes		144,231		
Registered electors		209,579		▲35.91
Independent gain from JD(S)		Swing	▼7.28	

=== Assembly Election 2004 ===
2004 Karnataka Legislative Assembly election : Malavalli
Party	Candidate	Votes	%	±%
JD(S)	Annadani. K	38,860	38.68%	▲16.26
INC	P. M. Narendraswamy	27,630	27.50%	▲3.75
JD(U)	B. Somashekar	21,443	21.34%	▼8.09
BSP	Shiva Kumara	7,704	7.67%	New
JP	Nanjundaiah. H	1,885	1.88%	New
Independent	Vijayaraju. K. J	1,102	1.10%	New
Kannada Nadu Party	Shiva Shankar. K. N	664	0.66%	New
Urs Samyuktha Paksha	Mahadavaiah. J	637	0.63%	New
Margin of victory		11,230	11.18%	▲5.49
Turnout		100,487	65.17%	▼7.16
Total valid votes		100,468		
Registered electors		154,200		▲10.80
JD(S) gain from JD(U)		Swing	▲9.25	

=== Assembly Election 1999 ===
1999 Karnataka Legislative Assembly election : Malavalli
Party	Candidate	Votes	%	±%
JD(U)	B. Somashekar	27,335	29.43%	New
INC	P. M. Narendraswamy	22,054	23.75%	▼3.89
JD(S)	K. Annadani S/o Kenchaiah	20,826	22.42%	New
Independent	B. Mallajamma D/o Late Basavaiah	16,604	17.88%	New
Independent	B. S. Puttaswamy S/o Sannaiah	4,183	4.50%	New
Independent	V. Mariswamy S/o Veeraiah	1,243	1.34%	New
Independent	B. K. Somashekar S/o. B. Kempaiah	625	0.67%	New
Margin of victory		5,281	5.69%	▼30.96
Turnout		100,661	72.33%	▼2.75
Total valid votes		92,870		
Rejected ballots		7,709	7.66%	▲5.87
Registered electors		139,168		▲3.40
JD(U) gain from JD		Swing	▼34.86	

=== Assembly Election 1994 ===
1994 Karnataka Legislative Assembly election : Malavalli
Party	Candidate	Votes	%	±%
JD	B. Somashekar	63,808	64.29%	▲43.78
INC	Mallajamma	27,435	27.64%	▼13.60
INC	Kemparaju	2,909	2.93%	New
BJP	Siddaramu. M	2,396	2.41%	▲1.70
BSP	Nanjundaswamy	1,067	1.08%	New
Independent	M. L. Lingarajamurthy	1,013	1.02%	New
Margin of victory		36,373	36.65%	▲16.12
Turnout		101,053	75.08%	▲0.17
Total valid votes		99,248		
Rejected ballots		1,805	1.79%	▼4.01
Registered electors		134,591		▲9.63
JD gain from INC		Swing	▲23.05	

=== Assembly Election 1989 ===
1989 Karnataka Legislative Assembly election : Malavalli
Party	Candidate	Votes	%	±%
INC	Mallajamma	35,723	41.24%	▲2.45
JP	M. L. Lingarajamurthy	17,936	20.70%	New
JD	B. Somashekar	17,768	20.51%	New
Independent	L. Shivalingaiah	7,153	8.26%	New
Kranti Sabha	M. Siddaiah	4,792	5.53%	New
Independent	K. Mutharaju	970	1.12%	New
Independent	Devaiah	646	0.75%	New
BJP	Thimmaiah	619	0.71%	▲0.05
Margin of victory		17,787	20.53%	▲1.04
Turnout		91,965	74.91%	▼0.67
Total valid votes		86,630		
Rejected ballots		5,335	5.80%	▲4.40
Registered electors		122,766		▲22.58
INC gain from JP		Swing	▼17.04	

=== Assembly Election 1985 ===
1985 Karnataka Legislative Assembly election : Malavalli
Party	Candidate	Votes	%	±%
JP	B. Somashekar	43,497	58.28%	▲6.77
INC	H. D. Amaranathan	28,951	38.79%	▼2.05
Independent	D. R. Nanjaiah	875	1.17%	New
BJP	M. D. Krishnappa	489	0.66%	▼0.74
Margin of victory		14,546	19.49%	▲8.82
Turnout		75,695	75.58%	▲3.72
Total valid votes		74,635		
Rejected ballots		1,060	1.40%	▼0.77
Registered electors		100,154		▲13.45
JP hold		Swing	▲6.77	

=== Assembly Election 1983 ===
1983 Karnataka Legislative Assembly election : Malavalli
Party	Candidate	Votes	%	±%
JP	Somasekhar	31,966	51.51%	▲5.59
INC	M. Madaiah	25,345	40.84%	▲32.58
Independent	Guruvaiah	1,167	1.88%	New
INC(J)	Kemparaju	1,034	1.67%	New
BJP	M. D. Krishnappa	869	1.40%	New
Independent	Madamma	603	0.97%	New
Independent	R. Siddaiah	459	0.74%	New
Independent	M. Shankaraiah	391	0.63%	New
Margin of victory		6,621	10.67%	▲10.57
Turnout		63,437	71.86%	▼3.18
Total valid votes		62,059		
Rejected ballots		1,378	2.17%	▼0.28
Registered electors		88,284		▲6.85
JP hold		Swing	▲5.59	

=== Assembly Election 1978 ===
1978 Karnataka Legislative Assembly election : Malavalli
Party	Candidate	Votes	%	±%
JP	K. L. Mariswami	27,774	45.92%	New
INC(I)	M. Shivaiah	27,712	45.82%	New
INC	M. Malikarjnna Swamy	4,998	8.26%	▼55.80
Margin of victory		62	0.10%	▼28.02
Turnout		62,004	75.04%	▲14.85
Total valid votes		60,484		
Rejected ballots		1,520	2.45%	▲2.45
Registered electors		82,624		▲18.49
JP gain from INC		Swing	▼18.14	

=== Assembly Election 1972 ===
1972 Mysore State Legislative Assembly election : Malavalli
Party	Candidate	Votes	%	±%
INC	M. Malikarjnna Swamy	26,231	64.06%	▼1.56
INC(O)	D. Rudraiah	14,717	35.94%	New
Margin of victory		11,514	28.12%	▼14.72
Turnout		41,973	60.19%	▲2.68
Total valid votes		40,948		
Registered electors		69,733		▲16.52
INC hold		Swing	▼1.56	

=== Assembly Election 1967 ===
1967 Mysore State Legislative Assembly election : Malavalli
Party	Candidate	Votes	%	±%
INC	M. Malikarjnna Swamy	21,077	65.62%	▲1.52
PSP	M. Mahadevaswamy	7,316	22.78%	▼10.98
RPI	N. M. Kempaiah	1,273	3.96%	New
Independent	M. C. Venkateshan	1,103	3.43%	New
Independent	G. Dasaiah	910	2.83%	New
Independent	Chikkalingaiah	443	1.38%	New
Margin of victory		13,761	42.84%	▲12.50
Turnout		34,419	57.51%	▼15.95
Total valid votes		32,122		
Registered electors		59,845		▲23.39
INC hold		Swing	▲1.52	

=== Assembly Election 1962 ===
1962 Mysore State Legislative Assembly election : Malavalli
Party	Candidate	Votes	%	±%
INC	G. Made Gowda	21,167	64.10%	▼3.06
PSP	M. C. Doddaiah	11,149	33.76%	▲18.71
Independent	M. C. Kempaiah	707	2.14%	New
Margin of victory		10,018	30.34%	▲10.99
Turnout		35,630	73.46%	▲23.94
Total valid votes		33,023		
Registered electors		48,502		▼41.93
INC hold		Swing	▲29.70	

=== Assembly Election 1957 ===
1957 Mysore State Legislative Assembly election : Malavalli
Party	Candidate	Votes	%	±%
INC	H. V. Veeregowda	28,454	34.40%	▼1.06
INC	M. Malikarjnna Swamy	27,102	32.76%	▼2.70
PSP	B. P. Nagaraja Murthy	12,449	15.05%	New
SCF	M. Chikkalingaiah	9,723	11.75%	▼6.49
Independent	M. N. Venkatappa	3,273	3.96%	New
Independent	M. N. Venkatappa	1,723	2.08%	New
Margin of victory		16,005	19.35%	▲19.12
Turnout		82,724	49.52%	▼45.87
Total valid votes		82,724		
Registered electors		83,528		▲8.96
INC gain from KMPP		Swing	▲9.36	

=== Assembly Election 1952 ===
1952 Mysore State Legislative Assembly election : Malavalli
Party	Candidate	Votes	%	±%
KMPP	B. P. Nagaraja Murthy	18,314	25.04%	New
INC	K. V. Veerappa	18,144	24.81%	New
SCF	M. Chikkalingaiah	13,339	18.24%	New
Independent	K. T. Ramaswamy	11,252	15.39%	New
INC	M. C. Venkateshan	7,787	10.65%	New
Independent	K. Lakshminarayana Rao	4,295	5.87%	New
Margin of victory		170	0.23%	
Turnout		73,131	47.70%	
Total valid votes		73,131		
Registered electors		76,662		
KMPP win (new seat)				

== See also ==
- Mandya district
- List of constituencies of Karnataka Legislative Assembly
