= Dinesh Gundu Rao =

Indian politician

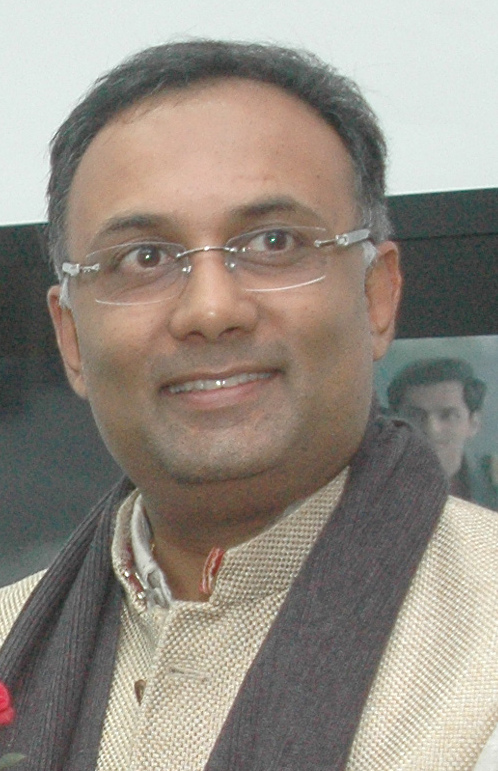

Cabinet Minister Government of Karnataka
- In office 27 May 2023 – 29 May 2026
- Governor: Thawarchand Gehlot
- Cabinet: Second Siddaramaiah ministry
- Chief Minister: Siddaramaiah
- Ministry and Departments: Health & Family Welfare
- Preceded by: K.Sudhakar
- Succeeded by: U. T. Khader
- In office 20 May 2015 – 21 June 2016
- Governor: Vajubhai Vala
- Cabinet: First Siddaramaiah ministry
- Chief Minister: Siddaramaiah
- Ministry and Departments: Food & Civil Supplies; Consumer Affairs
- Preceded by: D. N. Jeevaraj
- Succeeded by: U. T. Khader

Member of Karnataka Legislative Assembly
- Incumbent
- Assumed office 25 October 1999
- Preceded by: B. Muniyappa
- Constituency: Gandhi Nagar

Incharge of AICC for Puducherry and Tamil Nadu
- In office 11 September 2020 – 24 December 2023
- President: Mallikarjun Kharge
- Succeeded by: Ajoy Kumar

President of Karnataka Pradesh Congress Committee
- In office 4 July 2018 – 11 March 2020
- Preceded by: G. Parameshwara
- Succeeded by: D. K. Shivakumar

Personal details
- Born: 9 October 1969 (age 57) Kushalanagar, Mysore State, India
- Party: Indian National Congress
- Spouse: Tabassum Rao
- Children: 2
- Parent: R. Gundu Rao (father)
- Education: Bishop Cotton Boys School, B.M.S. College of Engineering

Dinesh Gundu Rao (born 9 October 1969) is an Indian politician who served as the minister of health and family welfare from May 2023 to June 2026 in the Government of Karnataka. He previously held the food and civil supplies and consumer affairs portfolios between 2015 and 2016. A member of the Indian National Congress, he served as president of its Karnataka unit, the Karnataka Pradesh Congress Committee, between 2018 and 2020. Rao has represented Gandhi Nagar in the Karnataka Legislative Assembly since 1999. He is the son of former Chief Minister of Karnataka R. Gundu Rao.

== Personal life ==
Rao was born in a Hindu family in Kushalanagar, a town in Mysore State's Kodagu district (now Karnataka). He is the second of the three sons of former Chief Minister of Karnataka, R. Gundu Rao. His mother Varalakshmi (died 2019), older brother Mahesh and Rajesh both had stints in politics. Dinesh attended the Bishop Cotton Boys' School in Bangalore before securing an engineering degree in electronics and communications from B.M.S. College of Engineering in 1992. He married Tabassum in an interfaith marriage in 1994, and has two daughters with her, Ananya and Amira.

== Political career ==
Rao was the Congress candidate for Assembly Constituency (Bruhat Bengaluru Mahanagara Palike District) in the 1999 Karnataka Legislative Assembly Elections. The count of total votes polled for this election was 61,212. Out of these, Rao of Congress secured 40,797 votes to win the seat, defeating the nearest rival Nagaraj V of JD (S) by a margin of 28268 votes.

He was president of the Karnataka Youth Congress, and is currently a Member of the Legislative Assembly for sixth time (MLA).

He is six time winner in the Karnataka elections. Dinesh Gundu Rao was minister of state for food, civil supplies and consumer affairs in the government of Karnataka, and he was President of the KPCC. Following his party's poor showing at the 2019 by-elections, he resigned from the position. In September 2020, he was appointed All India Congress Committee in-charge of Goa, Puducherry and Tamil Nadu. On 4 January 2023, Manickam Tagore succeeded him as AICC incharge of Goa.

=== Minister of Health ===
Rao took oath as a minister on 27 May 2023. He was handed the health and family welfare portfolio two days later. One of Rao's first acts was to review the condition of state-run dialysis centres in the State and the process in which tenders were given. He felt that prices were high and directed for a fresh tender to be rolled out and that "[s]hortage of nephrologists in these centres will also be addressed." A few months later, he stated that more than 3,000 doctors would be recruited to address their shortage in government-run hospitals. In May 2025, a pay revision of 20 to 55 percent depending on the post under the National Health Mission was approved. It included medical officers, specialist doctors, and staff nurses working in Special Newborn Care Units and Intensive care units.

In September 2023, intending to strengthen the public healthcare system in Karnataka, a memorandum of understanding was signed by the department of health with Centre for Cellular and Molecular Platforms, a Bengaluru-based deep-tech innovation hub. Rao stated that improved diagnostics and screening were two areas that the government prioritized "as a means to boost health outcomes". Later that year, a mobile clinic named Wellness on Wheels was initiated by the department. It was the product of a partnership between Volvo and Narayana Health. Rao stated that the clinic would travel across the state, including rural areas and slums, making healthcare accessible to all, and that the services offered would be echo, X-ray, ultrasound and mammogram, free of cost.

An increasing trend of female foeticide was seen in the early tenure of Rao. It was reported that sex ratio in the State fell from 947 to 929 in 2023. Addressing the issue in the assembly, Rao spoke of "rising cases of female foeticide that thrive in the state through organised rackets comprising doctors, lab technicians, nurses and hospital managements." He also stated that there had been an increase in sex determination practices in the State, which is illegal in India. He added that a CID probe had been ordered to investigate it.

In February 2024, the government passed the Cigarettes and Other Tobacco Products Bill, 2024, raising the age limit of sale of cigarettes from 18 years to 21 years. While presenting the Bill before the House, Rao added that other provisions included "...cigarettes cannot be sold within 100 meters of schools" and a penalty of ₹1,000 was imposed in cases of violation. The sale of both tobacco and non-tobacco hookah at public places was also banned. In May that year, Rao announced a ban on food color added on street food such as Gobi Manchurian, after random samples were tested to contain Rhodamine B, a cancer-causing agent that is found in industrial dyes. In September. he wrote to the Prime Minister urging the 18 percent Goods and Services Tax (GST) on health insurance be abolished. He wrote, "A GST so high on what is an essential service/necessity, especially in a post pandemic world, is draconian to say the least and definitely not what a welfare state should be doing."
