= C. N. Manjunath =

Indian politician, writer and cardiologist

Dr. C. N. Manjunath

Member of Parliament, Lok Sabha
- Incumbent
- Assumed office 4 June 2024
- Preceded by: D. K. Suresh
- Constituency: Bangalore Rural

Personal details
- Born: Cholenahalli Nanjappa Manjunath; 23 September 1957 (age 68) Cholenahalli, Channarayapatna Taluk, Hassan district, Karnataka, India
- Party: Bharatiya Janata Party
- Spouse: H. D. Anasuya
- Parent(s): Nanjappa Gowda and Shambhamma
- Relatives: H. D. Deve Gowda (father-in-law) H. D. Kumaraswamy (brother-in-law); C. N. Balakrishna (Brother)
- Education: Mysore Medical College
- Occupation: Politician and former director at Sri Jayadeva Institute of Cardiovascular Sciences and Research
- Awards: Padma Shri; Rajyotsava Prashasti Honorary Doctorate from Bangalore University in 2019

Cholenahalli Nanjappa Manjunath (born 23 September 1957) is an Indian cardiologist turned politician. He is the MP of Bangalore Rural Lok Sabha constituency. He is the son in law of H. D. Deve Gowda.

He was the director of the Government run Sri Jayadeva Institute of Cardiovascular Sciences and Research. He had the distinction of serving as a Director of the Government's Autonomous Institute for 18 years. Ever since he had taken charge as Director of the Institute, he had provided high quality cardiac care at an affordable cost to all sections of society.

He has been mainly responsible for the Institute's growth of 500% in the last 17 years. His dedicated efforts had resulted in increasing the bed strength from 330 to 2000 exclusively for Cardiac Care which had made Shri Jayadeva Institute a largest Single Center Cardiac Care Destination Center in South East Asia. He has been instrumental in establishing advanced Cardiac Care Hospitals at Mysuru, Kalaburagi, KC General Hospital Bangalore, Rajajinagar ESI Hospital, Bangalore And initiated the Hubballi Jayadeva hospital.

His dedicated efforts had resulted in promotion of Research activities in the Institute enabling the Doctors to publish 400 Research Articles in the last 5 years in the National and International Scientific Publications.

He has provided consultancy services and follow up treatment to 30 Districts and Medical College Hospitals.

His three slogans which he practiced were "Treatment First Payment Next", "Life is more important than the Money" and "Humanity is priority". His cost-effective quality Cardiac Care Model has been appreciated by London School of Economics, Leadership School of Singapore, Yale University of USA, IIM Bangalore and even Former US President Barack Obama has acknowledged his services.

Presently, he is the Member of Parliament representing Bengaluru Rural having won the Lok Sabha Elections by huge margin of 2.7 Lakh votes.

Dr. Manjunath has been conferred Padma Shri Award in the year 2007 for his Professional, Philanthropic and Social commitments.Padma Shri He inaugurated the 410th edition Of Mysore Dasara on 17 October 2020 which is the Nadahabba (State festival) as a mark of honour for "Corona warriors" in the COVID-19 pandemic.

== Biography ==
Born to Nanjappa Gowda in the Hassan district of the south Indian state of Karnataka. According to his CV, he started his career as an intern at Bangalore Medical College in 1982 and moved to Kasturba Medical College, Mangalore in 1985 as a senior registrar at the department of cardiology, staying there for three years.

In 1988, he joined Sri Jayadeva Institute of Cardiovascular Sciences and Research as a member of faculty and worked there in various capacities such as Assistant Professor and the Professor of Cardiology till he was appointed as the director of the institution in 2006. It is said that the former director of the hospital Dr Prabudev resigned to facilitate this appointment . He also got to serve as the president of the Indian College of Cardiology. He received the fourth highest Indian civilian honour of the Padma Shri and Rajiv Gandhi University of Health Sciences (RGUHS) gave him an honorary degree of Doctor of Science.

Manjunath married the daughter of former Prime Minister of India, H. D. Deve Gowda and the family lives in Bengaluru. His life has been documented in a biography, Biography of a living legend.

== See also ==
- Sri Jayadeva Institute of Cardiology
- H. D. Deve Gowda
