= H. C. Srikantaiah =

Indian politician

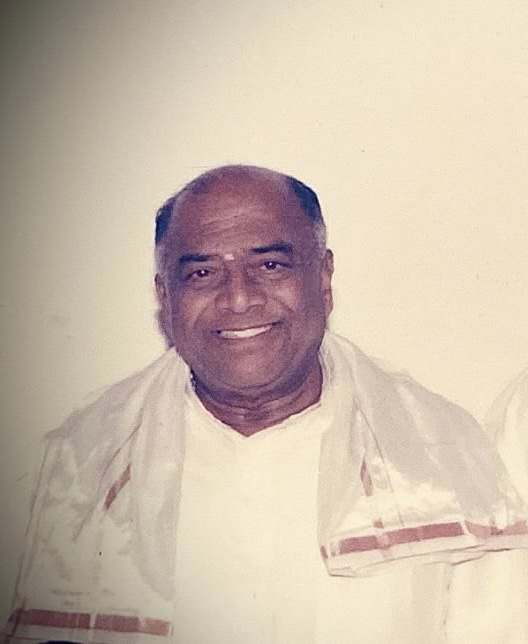

Minister of Revenue Government of Karnataka
- In office 11 October 1999 – 28 May 2004
- Chief Minister: S.M Krishna
- Preceded by: D. Manjunath
- Succeeded by: M.P Prakash

Member of Parliament, Lok Sabha
- In office 2 December 1989 – 13 March 1991
- Preceded by: H.N Nanje Gowda
- Succeeded by: H.D Deve Gowda
- Constituency: Hassan

Member of Karnataka Legislative Assembly for Shravanabelagola (Karnataka Assembly constituency)
- In office 1972–1985
- Preceded by: S. Shivappa
- Succeeded by: N. Gangadhar
- Constituency: Shravanabelagola

Member of Karnataka Legislative Assembly for Shravanabelagola
- In office 1999–2004
- Preceded by: C.S Putte Gowda
- Succeeded by: C.S Putte Gowda
- Constituency: Shravanabelagola

Member of Karnataka Legislative Council
- In office 1986–1989

Personal details
- Born: 18 July 1926 Hirisave, Mysore State, British India
- Died: 12 March 2011 (aged 84) Bengaluru, Karnataka, India
- Resting place: Hirisave, Karnataka
- Party: Indian National Congress until 2009; Bharatiya Janata Party 2009-2011
- Spouse: Late. Nagamma (m. 1948)
- Children: 3 Sons, 5 Daughters; H.S Chandru; H.S Ravi Kumar; H.S Vijay Kumar; H.S Prabha; H.S Vasantha; H.S Indira; H.S Sudha; H.S Suma
- Parent(s): Late Patel Chowdegowda and Late Rangamma
- Nickname: Annaiah (Big Brother)

Hirisave Chowdegowda Srikantaiah (18 July 1926 - 12 March 2011) was an Indian politician with the Indian National Congress party and a Member of Parliament of 9th Lok Sabha. He was elected to Karnataka Legislative Assembly from Shravanabelagola assembly constituency in Hassan from 1972 to 1985 and from 1999 to 2004. He was a Minister in Government of Karnataka in cabinets of Devaraj Urs, Veerendra Patil and S.M Krishna holding portfolios such as Revenue, Urban Development, Forest, Minor Irrigation, Public Works and Municipal Administration.

== Early life and family ==
H.C Srikantaiah was born in Hirisave village of Channarayapatna taluk in Hassan district of the erstwhile Mysore State (in present-day Karnataka). He married Nagamma in 1948. They had 3 sons and 5 daughters. He was from the Vokkaliga community in Karnataka. His eldest son H. S. Chandru died on 29 December 2020 in Bangalore. He was survived by son H. C. Lalithraghav and a daughter.

== Political career ==
H.C Srikantaiah began his political career by winning as an independent candidate from Shravanabelagola assembly constituency in Hassan in 1972. He later joined Indian National Congress and won continuously until 1985. He was a member of Karnataka Legislative Assembly from 1972 to 1985 and from 1999 to 2004. Srikantaiah was a Minister in Karnataka for almost 20 years. In 1980 H.C Srikantaiah famously defected 84 MLA's from the Congress (U) to Congress (I) to form the Government in Karnataka thus ending Devraj Urs tenure as Chief Minister of Karnataka for the second term. Srikantaiah had a chance to become the Chief minister after the defection of the 84 MLA's but Gundu Rao was picked for the post by Sanjay Gandhi. He was the Minister for Cooperation in Gundu Rao ministry. After spending nearly four decades in the Indian National Congress, Srikantaiah joined the BJP ahead of 2009 Parliament elections.

== Key Contributions ==
Abolition of Stamp Papers

The stamp paper piracy was one of the biggest scams in the recent history of the country which has caused huge losses beyond estimation to the state exchequer. The pioneering idea of abolishing the stamp papers and an alternative foolproof system was introduced by Sri. H.C Srikantaiah during his tenure of Revenue Minister.

== Death ==
He died on 12 March 2011, at a private hospital in Bangalore after a prolonged illness. He was 85. He was cremated in his birthplace Hirisave village of Channarayapatna taluk in Hassan district with state honours.
