= K. M. Doddi =

K. M. Doddi Kalamuddana Doddi
- K. M. Doddi
- Interactive map of K. M. Doddi
- Coordinates: 12.48200°N 77.03476°E
- Country: India
- State: Karnataka
- District: Mandya

Area
  - Total: 1.97 km^{2} (0.76 sq mi)

Population (2011)
  - Total: 6,393
- Time zone: UTC+5:30 (IST)
- PIN: 571422

Kala Muddana Doddi or simply K. M. Doddi is a Census town in Maddur taluk of Mandya district in the state of Karnataka, India. As per census survey 2011, its location code number is 614653.

== Location ==
K. M. Doddi is located between Maddur and Malavalli, about 18 km away from the district centre of Mandya,33 km away from Channapatna and about 100 km away from the state capital, Bangalore.

== Education ==
Bharathi Education trust in Bharathinagara is an institution of higher learning located in a rural and socially backward sector (as notified by the UGC) situated in Mandya District in Karnataka. It is an integrated First Grade College permanently affiliated to the University of Mysore, Established in 1970. It is the dream child of G. Made Gowda a veteran legislator parliamentarian, Gandhian statesman and an educational administrator gifted with foresight and vision. G. Made Gowda founded the Bharathi Education Trust in 1961 with the lofty object of providing higher education to empower rural students in a backward hinterland of Mandya.

== Economy ==
This small town is agrarian in nature. There are several nationalized bank branches such as State Bank of India, Bank of Baroda,Karnataka Bank, Canara Bank, Karnataka ಗ್ರಾಮೀಣ ಬ್ಯಾಂಕ್ ,ಡಿಸಿಸಿ ಬ್ಯಾಂಕ್, Chamundeswari Sugar's sugar factory, Several mini and micro finance services such as IIFL, Muthoot, Manapuram.
