= Kallahalli =

Karnataka village

Coordinates: 12.307628°N 76.219146°E

Kallahalli is a village in Chamarajanagara taluk in Chamarajanagara district of Karnataka state, India.
