= Hirisave =

- village
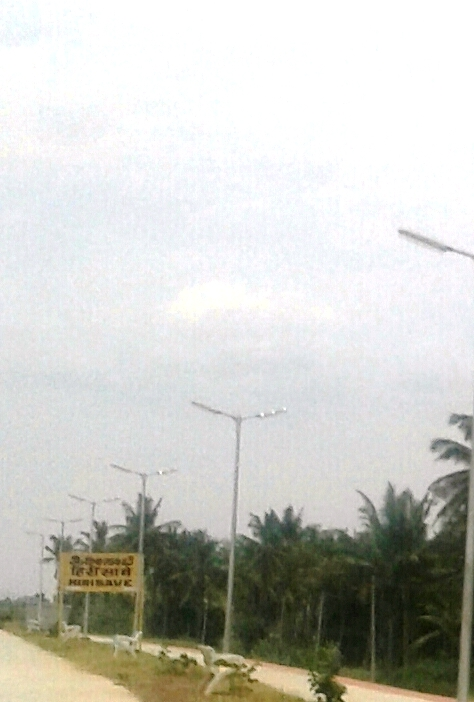
- Hirisave Railway Station
- Interactive map of Hirisave
- Coordinates: 12.917°N 76.467°E
- Country: India
- State: Karnataka
- District: Hassan

Government
  - Body: Village Panchayat

Area
  - Total: 7.7 km^{2} (3.0 sq mi)
- Elevation: 868 m (2,848 ft)

Population (2011)
  - Total: 5,009
  - Density: 650/km^{2} (1,700/sq mi)

Languages
  - Official: Kannada
- Time zone: UTC+5:30 (IST)
- PIN: 573 124
- Telephone code: 08176
- ISO 3166 code: IN-KA
- Vehicle registration: KA 13
- Website: karnataka.gov.in

Hirisave is a village in Channarayapatna taluk, of Hassan district in the state of Karnataka, India. It is 18 km from the popular Jain pilgrimage centre of Shravanabelagola. It lies on National Highway 75 which connects Bangalore with the port city of Mangalore. Most of the population speaks Kannada and major income source is from agriculture. The main tourist attraction is Hirisave Chowdeswary temple and Channakeshava temple.
