= Kirugavalu Assembly constituency =

Former constituency in Karnataka, India

Coordinates: 12.37°N 76.95°E

Kirugavalu
- Former constituency for the Karnataka Legislative Assembly

Constituency details
- Country: India
- Region: South India
- State: Karnataka
- District: Mandya
- Lok Sabha constituency: Mandya
- Established: 1962
- Abolished: 2008
- Reservation: None

Kirugavalu Assembly constituency was one of the 224 constituencies in the Karnataka Legislative Assembly of Karnataka a southern state of India. It was also part of Mandya Lok Sabha constituency.

== Members of the Legislative Assembly ==
Election	Member	Party
1962	M. Mallikarjunaswamy	Indian National Congress
1967	G. Made Gowda	Indian National Congress
1972	G. Made Gowda	Indian National Congress
1978	G. Made Gowda	Janata Party
1983	G. Made Gowda	Indian National Congress
1985	G. Made Gowda	Indian National Congress
1989	K. M. Puttu	Indian National Congress
1994	K. N. Nagegowda	Janata Dal
1999	D. C. Thammanna	Indian National Congress
2004	Nagamani. M. K	Janata Dal

== Election results ==
=== Assembly Election 2004 ===
2004 Karnataka Legislative Assembly election : Kirugavalu
Party	Candidate	Votes	%	±%
JD(U)	Nagamani. M. K	53,590	51.53%	▲7.66
INC	Madhu G. Madegowda	38,029	36.57%	▼8.02
JD(S)	Dr. Avinash Gowda. M. D	7,035	6.76%	▲0.95
JP	Ravigowda. U. C	2,611	2.51%	New
Kannada Nadu Party	Mahadevappa. K	1,423	1.37%	New
Independent	Jayashankar Gowda	1,304	1.25%	New
Margin of victory		15,561	14.96%	▲14.23
Turnout		104,009	74.24%	▼7.17
Total valid votes		103,992		
Registered electors		140,105		▲9.36
JD(U) gain from INC		Swing	▲6.94	

=== Assembly Election 1999 ===
1999 Karnataka Legislative Assembly election : Kirugavalu
Party	Candidate	Votes	%	±%
INC	D. C. Thammanna	44,523	44.59%	▲15.05
JD(U)	K. N. Nagegowda	43,799	43.87%	New
JD(S)	S. Shivanna	5,801	5.81%	New
BSP	N. Mahesh	4,887	4.89%	▲2.12
Independent	Andani	638	0.64%	New
Margin of victory		724	0.73%	▼6.93
Turnout		104,294	81.41%	▼0.50
Total valid votes		99,842		
Rejected ballots		4,411	4.23%	▲2.88
Registered electors		128,116		▲5.93
INC gain from JD		Swing	▲7.40	

=== Assembly Election 1994 ===
1994 Karnataka Legislative Assembly election : Kirugavalu
Party	Candidate	Votes	%	±%
JD	K. N. Nagegowda	36,348	37.19%	New
INC	B. Basavaraju	28,866	29.54%	▼18.82
Independent	Rame Gowda	21,453	21.95%	New
Kranti Sabha	Shivalingegowda	4,035	4.13%	▼3.97
BSP	S. Shivanna	2,709	2.77%	New
INC	K. M. Jayashankar	2,107	2.16%	New
BJP	J. Krishna	1,010	1.03%	New
Margin of victory		7,482	7.66%	▼0.66
Turnout		99,058	81.91%	▲0.45
Total valid votes		97,724		
Rejected ballots		1,334	1.35%	▼2.45
Registered electors		120,942		▲8.12
JD gain from INC		Swing	▼11.17	

=== Assembly Election 1989 ===
1989 Karnataka Legislative Assembly election : Kirugavalu
Party	Candidate	Votes	%	±%
INC	K. M. Puttu	42,391	48.36%	▼0.82
JP	Rame Gowda	35,102	40.04%	New
Kranti Sabha	S. B. Raju	7,103	8.10%	New
Independent	S. Krishnappa	1,267	1.45%	New
Independent	K. Made Gowda	840	0.96%	New
Margin of victory		7,289	8.32%	▲7.28
Turnout		91,121	81.46%	▼1.68
Total valid votes		87,657		
Rejected ballots		3,464	3.80%	▲2.68
Registered electors		111,856		▲23.82
INC hold		Swing	▼0.82	

=== Assembly Election 1985 ===
1985 Karnataka Legislative Assembly election : Kirugavalu
Party	Candidate	Votes	%	±%
INC	G. Made Gowda	36,519	49.18%	▼6.74
JP	Rame Gowda	35,747	48.14%	▲8.94
Independent	Prashanthkumar. M. S	1,242	1.67%	New
Margin of victory		772	1.04%	▼15.68
Turnout		75,103	83.14%	▲1.41
Total valid votes		74,263		
Rejected ballots		840	1.12%	▼0.38
Registered electors		90,335		▲12.00
INC hold		Swing	▼6.74	

=== Assembly Election 1983 ===
1983 Karnataka Legislative Assembly election : Kirugavalu
Party	Candidate	Votes	%	±%
INC	G. Made Gowda	36,310	55.92%	▲50.54
JP	Rame Gowda	25,454	39.20%	▼24.80
Independent	K. C. Chowdegowda	1,062	1.64%	New
Independent	P. Channabasavaiah	857	1.32%	New
Independent	B. R. Rajendraprakash	452	0.70%	New
Margin of victory		10,856	16.72%	▼16.66
Turnout		65,924	81.73%	▼6.14
Total valid votes		64,936		
Rejected ballots		988	1.50%	▼0.23
Registered electors		80,656		▲9.49
INC gain from JP		Swing	▼8.08	

=== Assembly Election 1978 ===
1978 Karnataka Legislative Assembly election : Kirugavalu
Party	Candidate	Votes	%	±%
JP	G. Made Gowda	40,711	64.00%	New
INC(I)	Rame Gowda	19,480	30.62%	New
INC	B. P. Nagaraja Murthy	3,420	5.38%	▼41.70
Margin of victory		21,231	33.38%	▲29.41
Turnout		64,730	87.87%	▲12.53
Total valid votes		63,611		
Rejected ballots		1,119	1.73%	▲1.73
Registered electors		73,663		▲7.19
JP gain from INC(O)		Swing	▲12.95	

=== Assembly Election 1972 ===
1972 Mysore State Legislative Assembly election : Kirugavalu
Party	Candidate	Votes	%	±%
INC(O)	G. Made Gowda	25,829	51.05%	New
INC	K. N. Nagegowda	23,819	47.08%	▼22.38
Independent	Devaish	493	0.97%	New
Independent	M. M. Anvchaiah	451	0.89%	New
Margin of victory		2,010	3.97%	▼34.94
Turnout		51,775	75.34%	▼0.61
Total valid votes		50,592		
Registered electors		68,720		▲25.19
INC(O) gain from INC		Swing	▼18.41	

=== Assembly Election 1967 ===
1967 Mysore State Legislative Assembly election : Kirugavalu
Party	Candidate	Votes	%	±%
INC	G. Made Gowda	27,377	69.46%	▲9.16
Independent	H. K. V. Gowdh	12,039	30.54%	New
Margin of victory		15,338	38.91%	▲18.31
Turnout		41,689	75.95%	▲19.72
Total valid votes		39,416		
Registered electors		54,891		▲14.11
INC hold		Swing	▲9.16	

=== Assembly Election 1962 ===
1962 Mysore State Legislative Assembly election : Kirugavalu
Party	Candidate	Votes	%	±%
INC	M. Mallikarjunaswamy	15,039	60.30%	New
PSP	M. Chikkalingaiah	9,901	39.70%	New
Margin of victory		5,138	20.60%	
Turnout		27,049	56.23%	
Total valid votes		24,940		
Registered electors		48,103		
INC win (new seat)				

== See also ==
- Mandya district
- List of constituencies of Karnataka Legislative Assembly
