= R. Gundu Rao =

Indian politician

2nd Chief Minister of Karnataka
- In office 12 January 1980 – 6 January 1983
- Preceded by: Devaraj Urs
- Succeeded by: Ramakrishna Hegde

Member of Parliament, Lok Sabha
- In office 1989–1991
- Preceded by: V. S. Krishna Iyer
- Succeeded by: K. Venkatagiri Gowda
- Constituency: Bangalore South

Leader of the opposition in the Karnataka Legislative Assembly
- In office 17 December 1979 – 12 January 1980
- Preceded by: S. R. Bommai
- Succeeded by: D. Devaraj Urs

Minister of Transport and Tourism, Government of Karnataka
- In office 28 February 1978 – 17 December 1979

Minister of Housing and Youth Affairs, Government of Karnataka
- In office 1976–1977

Minister of State for Information, Youth Affairs and Sports, Government of Karnataka
- In office 1973–1976

Member of the Karnataka Legislative Assembly
- In office 1972–1983
- Preceded by: Gundugutti Manjanathaya
- Succeeded by: B. A. Jivijaya
- Constituency: Somwarpet

Personal details
- Born: 8 April 1937 Fraserpet, Nanjarajapatna Taluk, Coorg Province, British India (now Kushalnagara, Kodagu, Karnataka, India)
- Died: 22 August 1993 (aged 56) London, United Kingdom
- Party: Indian National Congress
- Spouse: Varalakshmi (m. 1965)
- Children: 3; including Dinesh

Rama Gundu Rao (27 September 1937 – 22 August 1993) was an Indian politician who was the 2nd Chief Minister of Karnataka from 1980 to 1983. A member of the Indian National Congress (INC), he was appointed Chief Minister after the resignation of the D. Devaraj Urs-led ministry, following the party's loss in 27 seats out of 28 in the 1980 general election. Rao, a loyalist of then Prime Minister Indira Gandhi, joined Congress (I), her faction of the INC, and formed the government in the State.

Rao was born and raised in Karnataka's Kodagu district. It was here that he began his political career when he was elected president of the Somwarpet Town Municipal Council. After joining the INC in 1965, he quickly rose through the ranks, and was elected to the legislative assembly of Mysore (later Karnataka) twice. After briefly serving as leader of opposition, he was appointed Chief Minister in 1980. In 1989, he was elected member of the Lok Sabha, the lower house of India's Parliament from Bangalore South. Rao died from leukemia in 1993, aged 56. His son Dinesh is also a politician and currently serves as the Minister of Health in the government of Karnataka.

== Early life ==
Rao was born in a Kannada-speaking Hindu Brahmin family in Kushalanagara in the erstwhile Coorg Province (now in Kodagu district of Karnataka) of British India on 8 April 1937. His parents were K. Rama Rao and Chinnamma. His father was a Headmaster in a local school. He studied in Ammathi High school. He was a well-known Ball Badminton Player in Kodagu and had won numerous trophies.

== Political career ==
=== Early political career ===
Rao began his political career when he was 24. Forming a political party named the Gundu Rao Party and driven by a group of youngsters, he contested the Kushalanagar municipal elections and won. He served as president of the council for a period of ten years between 1961 and 1971. However, he joined the Indian National Congress (INC) in 1965, and was appointed member of the Kodagu District Congress. He later served as the president of the Kodagu Youth Congress and subsequently the Karnataka Youth Congress, before becoming a member of the All India Congress Committee.

=== As legislator ===
Contesting the 1972 Mysore State Legislative Assembly election from Somvarpet, Rao won. The following year, he was appointed the minister of state and was handed the information, sports and youth affairs under the chief ministership of D. Devaraj Urs. In 1976, he was handed the cabinet rank and was appointed minister of housing and youth affairs. He held the portfolios until the government was dismissed in 1977. Upon being reelected in 1978 to the Assembly, Rao was handed the transport and tourism portfolios in the second Urs ministry. However, Rao grew distant from Urs' politics during this time and resigned as cabinet minister in 1979. His closeness to former Prime Minister Indira Gandhi led to his joining her faction of the party after the split, the Congress (I) that year. For a few days, he served as leader of opposition in the assembly. The loss in all of the 28 seats of the Lok Sabha Karnataka during the 1980 general election led to the resignation of the Urs-led Congress government. Aided by the support of Congress(I) legislators, which included 85 who had defected from Congress(U), and those of Janata Party, meant Rao laid claim to form a government with 127 legislators. He took oath as Karnataka's eighth chief minister on 12 January 1980. At age 43, he became the youngest Chief Minister in Karnataka's history.

=== Chief Minister ===
As Chief Minister, Rao was responsible for the construction of the Majestic bus station in Bangalore, which is today known as Kempegowda Bus Station. He also sanctioned numerous medical and engineering colleges in Karnataka. The Cauvery IInd Stage was completed within a year and half during his tenure. He was also responsible for the construction of the Kala Mandira in Mysore.

The Gokak agitation seeking supremacy for Kannada in the administration and education of Karnataka as well as the police firing on farmers at Nargund and Navalgund were the low points during his tenure as Chief minister. While he was acknowledged as an efficient administrator, he was more well known for his flamboyance, boldness and outspokenness.

=== As parliamentarian ===
Following his defeat in the 1983 election and Indira Gandhi's assassination in 1984, Rao fell out with her son and successor Rajiv Gandhi. He was denied the Somvarpet ticket to content the 1985 election. This led to Rao joining the All India Indira Gandhi Congress formed by Pranab Mukherjee in 1986. However, in 1989, he re-admitted to the INC by Gandhi. Rao then contested the election to the Lok Sabha from Bangalore South. He won by a margin of 250,000 votes, but stood in the opposition to the V. P. Singh-led Third Front government. Upon failing to retain his seat in 1991, Rao distanced himself from electoral politics.

== Personal life ==
Rao married Varalakshmi on 26 May 1965, and had three children with her: sons Mahesh, Dinesh and Rajesh. Rao was a regular at the iconic Koshy's in Bangalore and once stated that he had travelled across the globe looking for peace and Koshy's was the only place he found it.

Rao was diagnosed with leukemia and was admitted to the Royal Free Hospital in London on 1 June 1993. A three-course treatment had been completed and reported to have been recovering, before his death on 22 August. His wife unsuccessfully contested his seat in the 1996 election. She died in 2021. All three sons of Rao had stints in politics. Mahesh joined the Bharatiya Janata Party in 2003, while Dinesh had joined the INC soon after Rao's death, and would go on to become a legislator. The youngest son, Rajesh, joined the Janata Party in 2002 and was appointed State Youth President. Previously, he had appeared in Kannada-language films such as Hoovu Hannu (1993) and Samara (1995). He died from brain hemorrhage in 2012. Dinesh went on to become a legislator, and has represented Gandhinagar at the Karnataka Legislative Assembly since 1999. He has also served as cabinet minister holding portfolios such as food and civil supplies, and health and family welfare.

Preceded by D. Devaraj Urs	Chief Minister of Karnataka; 12 January 1980 – 6 January 1983	Succeeded by Ramakrishna Hegde
