= Shravanabelagola Assembly constituency =

Legislative Assembly constituency in Karnataka State, India

Coordinates: 12.85°N 76.48°E

Shravanabelagola
- Constituency No. 193 for the Karnataka Legislative Assembly
- Map of Shravanabelagola Assembly constituency

Constituency details
- Country: India
- Region: South India
- State: Karnataka
- District: Hassan
- Lok Sabha constituency: Hassan
- Established: 1956
- Total electors: 205,242 (2023)
- Reservation: None

Member of Legislative Assembly
- 16th Karnataka Legislative Assembly
- Incumbent C. N. Balakrishna
- Party: JD(S)
- Alliance: NDA
- Elected year: 2023
- Preceded by: C. S. Putte Gowda

Shravanabelagola Assembly constituency

Shravanabelagola Assembly constituency is one of the 224 Legislative Assembly constituencies of Karnataka in India. It is part of Hassan district.

== Members of the Legislative Assembly ==
Election	Member	Party
1957	N. G. Narasimhegowda	Praja Socialist Party
1962	S. Shivappa	Praja Socialist Party
1967	S. Shivappa	Praja Socialist Party
1972	H. C. Srikantaiah	Independent politician
1978	H. C. Srikantaiah	Indian National Congress
1983	H. C. Srikantaiah	Indian National Congress
1985	N. Gangadhar	Janata Party
1989	N. B. Nanjappa	Indian National Congress
1994	C. S. Putte Gowda	Janata Dal
1999	H. C. Srikantaiah	Indian National Congress
2004	C. S. Putte Gowda	Janata Dal
2008	C. S. Putte Gowda	Janata Dal
2013	C. N. Balakrishna	Janata Dal
2018	C. N. Balakrishna	Janata Dal
2023	C. N. Balakrishna	Janata Dal

== Election results ==
=== Assembly Election 2023 ===
2023 Karnataka Legislative Assembly election : Shravanabelagola
Party	Candidate	Votes	%	±%
JD(S)	C. N. Balakrishna	85,668	48.93	▼14.15
INC	M. A. Gopalaswamy	79,023	45.14	▲13.75
BJP	Chidhananda. C. R	5,648	3.23	▼1.26
NOTA	None of the above	667	0.38	▼0.16
Margin of victory		6,645	3.80	▼27.89
Turnout		175,199	85.36	▲2.66
Total valid votes		175,067		
Registered electors		205,242		▲1.48
JD(S) hold		Swing	▼14.15	

=== Assembly Election 2018 ===
2018 Karnataka Legislative Assembly election : Shravanabelagola
Party	Candidate	Votes	%	±%
JD(S)	C. N. Balakrishna	105,516	63.08	▲8.20
INC	C. S. Putte Gowda	52,504	31.39	▼8.29
BJP	Shivananjegowda	7,506	4.49	▲3.24
NOTA	None of the above	906	0.54	New
Margin of victory		53,012	31.69	▲16.49
Turnout		167,271	82.70	▲0.49
Total valid votes		167,261		
Registered electors		202,255		▲6.70
JD(S) hold		Swing	▲8.20	

=== Assembly Election 2013 ===
2013 Karnataka Legislative Assembly election : Shravanabelagola
Party	Candidate	Votes	%	±%
JD(S)	C. N. Balakrishna	87,185	54.88	▲5.26
INC	C. S. Putte Gowda	63,043	39.68	▼2.81
BJP	Manjunath. C. N. Patel	1,981	1.25	▼1.61
Margin of victory		24,142	15.20	▲8.07
Turnout		155,819	82.21	▲7.11
Total valid votes		158,869		
Registered electors		189,549		▲7.40
JD(S) hold		Swing	▲5.26	

=== Assembly Election 2008 ===
2008 Karnataka Legislative Assembly election : Shravanabelagola
Party	Candidate	Votes	%	±%
JD(S)	C. S. Putte Gowda	65,726	49.62	▼3.29
INC	H. C. Srikantaiah	56,280	42.49	▲15.77
BJP	Anand Shivappa	3,782	2.86	▼2.01
BSP	C. R. Abdul Hadi	2,578	1.95	New
Independent	Kurubara Kalenahalli Kovi Babanna	2,526	1.91	New
SP	C. S. Naveen	1,575	1.19	New
Margin of victory		9,446	7.13	▼19.06
Turnout		132,534	75.10	▲5.86
Total valid votes		132,467		
Registered electors		176,481		▼8.30
JD(S) hold		Swing	▼3.29	

=== Assembly Election 2004 ===
2004 Karnataka Legislative Assembly election : Shravanabelagola
Party	Candidate	Votes	%	±%
JD(S)	C. S. Putte Gowda	70,461	52.91	▲19.79
INC	Vijay Kumar. H. S	35,585	26.72	▼24.33
Independent	Chandre Gowda. C. N	13,505	10.14	New
BJP	Devaraje Gowda	6,484	4.87	▼6.05
JP	Range Gowda. R	3,822	2.87	New
RPI(A)	Channaiah. C. R	2,044	1.53	New
Urs Samyuktha Paksha	Mohan Kumar. B	1,283	0.96	New
Margin of victory		34,876	26.19	▲8.26
Turnout		133,247	69.24	▼4.25
Total valid votes		133,184		
Registered electors		192,448		▲6.46
JD(S) gain from INC		Swing	▲1.86	

=== Assembly Election 1999 ===
1999 Karnataka Legislative Assembly election : Shravanabelagola
Party	Candidate	Votes	%	±%
INC	H. C. Srikantaiah	65,624	51.05	▲14.52
JD(S)	C. S. Putte Gowda	42,576	33.12	New
BJP	H. C. Srikantaiah	14,034	10.92	▲6.73
Independent	K. T. Govindegowda	4,170	3.24	New
Independent	N. G. Vishakantegowda	2,141	1.67	New
Margin of victory		23,048	17.93	▲1.18
Turnout		132,840	73.49	▼1.27
Total valid votes		128,545		
Rejected ballots		4,246	3.20	▲2.18
Registered electors		180,768		▲6.53
INC gain from JD		Swing	▼2.23	

=== Assembly Election 1994 ===
1994 Karnataka Legislative Assembly election : Shravanabelagola
Party	Candidate	Votes	%	±%
JD	C. S. Putte Gowda	66,906	53.28	▲49.09
INC	H. C. Srikantaiah	45,871	36.53	▼20.30
INC	C. V. Rajappa	5,686	4.53	New
BJP	N. Gangadhar	5,258	4.19	New
Independent	H. B. Gangaraju	1,079	0.86	New
Margin of victory		21,035	16.75	▼2.06
Turnout		126,856	74.76	▼0.36
Total valid votes		125,565		
Rejected ballots		1,291	1.02	▼2.03
Registered electors		169,690		▲12.64
JD gain from INC		Swing	▼3.55	

=== Assembly Election 1989 ===
1989 Karnataka Legislative Assembly election : Shravanabelagola
Party	Candidate	Votes	%	±%
INC	N. B. Nanjappa	62,350	56.83	▲11.61
JP	C. S. Putte Gowda	41,711	38.02	New
JD	Devaraje Gowda	4,595	4.19	New
Margin of victory		20,639	18.81	▲12.61
Turnout		113,165	75.12	▲0.67
Total valid votes		109,710		
Rejected ballots		3,455	3.05	▲1.85
Registered electors		150,652		▲27.98
INC gain from JP		Swing	▲5.41	

=== Assembly Election 1985 ===
1985 Karnataka Legislative Assembly election : Shravanabelagola
Party	Candidate	Votes	%	±%
JP	N. Gangadhar	44,522	51.42	▲11.60
INC	N. B. Nanjappa	39,155	45.22	▼10.04
Independent	B. R. Chidambara	2,912	3.36	New
Margin of victory		5,367	6.20	▼9.24
Turnout		87,641	74.45	▼0.67
Total valid votes		86,589		
Rejected ballots		1,052	1.20	▼0.44
Registered electors		117,713		▲16.76
JP gain from INC		Swing	▼3.84	

=== Assembly Election 1983 ===
1983 Karnataka Legislative Assembly election : Shravanabelagola
Party	Candidate	Votes	%	±%
INC	H. C. Srikantaiah	41,164	55.26	New
JP	N. Gangadhar	29,662	39.82	▲3.92
Independent	D. C. Laxman	1,060	1.42	New
Independent	B. N. Krishna Murthy	739	0.99	New
Independent	Kanatarajapurada. M. S. Vasu	574	0.77	New
Independent	C. N. Laxmaiah Alias Mariyappa	506	0.68	New
Independent	T. P. Ramegowda	456	0.61	New
Margin of victory		11,502	15.44	▼9.40
Turnout		75,732	75.12	▼3.67
Total valid votes		74,488		
Rejected ballots		1,244	1.64	▼0.45
Registered electors		100,817		▲9.75
INC gain from INC(I)		Swing	▼5.49	

=== Assembly Election 1978 ===
1978 Karnataka Legislative Assembly election : Shravanabelagola
Party	Candidate	Votes	%	±%
INC(I)	H. C. Srikantaiah	43,045	60.75	New
JP	N. Gangadhar	25,440	35.90	New
Independent	K. Jairam	2,376	3.35	New
Margin of victory		17,605	24.84	▲0.54
Turnout		72,373	78.79	▲12.04
Total valid votes		70,861		
Rejected ballots		1,512	2.09	▲2.09
Registered electors		91,857		▲19.66
INC(I) gain from Independent		Swing	▲0.05	

=== Assembly Election 1972 ===
1972 Mysore State Legislative Assembly election : Shravanabelagola
Party	Candidate	Votes	%	±%
Independent	H. C. Srikantaiah	30,308	60.70	New
INC	Sakuntalamma	18,174	36.40	▲0.99
Independent	G. S. Thyagaraju	994	1.99	New
Independent	N. G. Kempegowda	458	0.92	New
Margin of victory		12,134	24.30	▼4.87
Turnout		51,239	66.75	▼8.18
Total valid votes		49,934		
Registered electors		76,767		▲13.62
Independent gain from PSP		Swing	▼3.89	

=== Assembly Election 1967 ===
1967 Mysore State Legislative Assembly election : Shravanabelagola
Party	Candidate	Votes	%	±%
PSP	S. Shivappa	30,637	64.59	▲1.72
INC	H. C. Srikantaiah	16,798	35.41	▼1.72
Margin of victory		13,839	29.17	▲3.43
Turnout		50,622	74.93	▲4.64
Total valid votes		47,435		
Registered electors		67,562		▲33.93
PSP hold		Swing	▲1.72	

=== Assembly Election 1962 ===
1962 Mysore State Legislative Assembly election : Shravanabelagola
Party	Candidate	Votes	%	±%
PSP	S. Shivappa	21,136	62.87	▲5.55
INC	K. Lakkappa	12,483	37.13	▲13.13
Margin of victory		8,653	25.74	▼7.58
Turnout		35,459	70.29	▲2.05
Total valid votes		33,619		
Registered electors		50,444		▲16.58
PSP hold		Swing	▲5.55	

=== Assembly Election 1957 ===
1957 Mysore State Legislative Assembly election : Shravanabelagola
Party	Candidate	Votes	%	±%
PSP	N. G. Narasimhegowda	16,923	57.32	New
INC	K. Lakkappa	7,086	24.00	New
Independent	S. Shivappa	4,980	16.87	New
Independent	S. L. Narasimhaiah	537	1.82	New
Margin of victory		9,837	33.32	
Turnout		29,526	68.24	
Total valid votes		29,526		
Registered electors		43,269		
PSP win (new seat)				

== Gallery ==
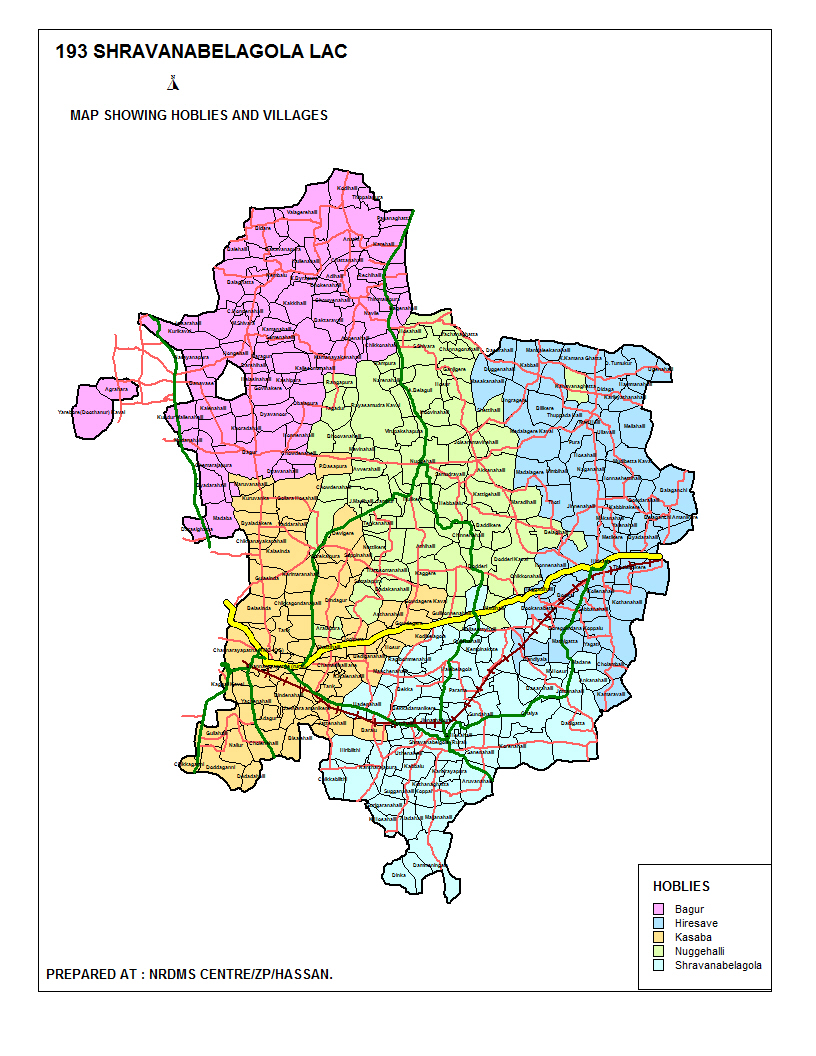
Hobli & Village Map of Shravanabelagola Assembly constituency, Channarayapatna Taluk

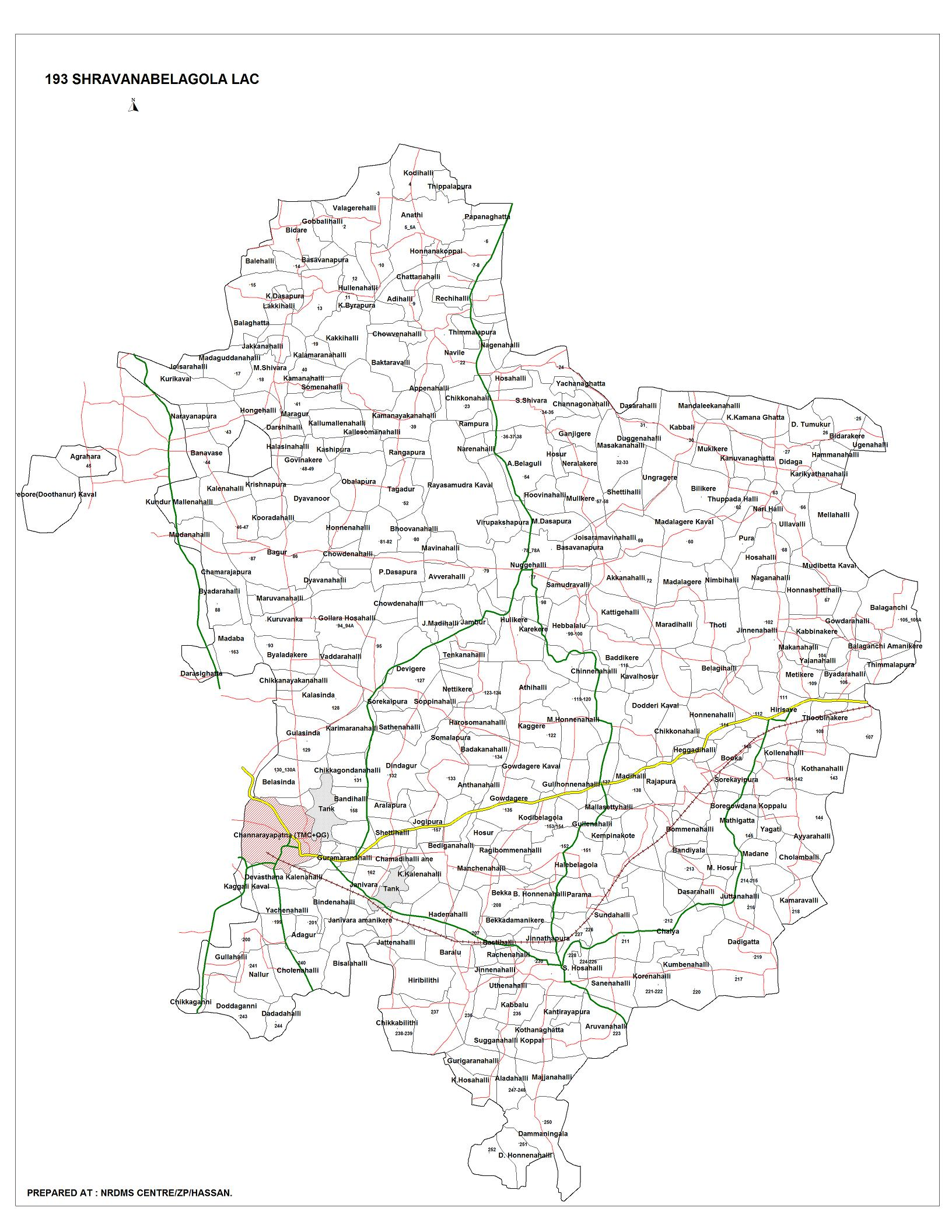
Village Map of Shravanabelagola Assembly constituency, Channarayapatna Taluk

== See also ==
- List of constituencies of the Karnataka Legislative Assembly
- Hassan district
