= D. Devaraj Urs =

Indian politician (1915–1982)

D. Devaraj Arasu

1st Chief Minister of Karnataka
- In office 28 February 1978 – 7 January 1980
- Preceded by: President's rule
- Succeeded by: R. Gundu Rao
- In office 1 November 1973 – 31 December 1977
- Preceded by: Office Established
- Succeeded by: President's rule

5th Chief Minister of Mysore State
- In office 20 March 1972 – 31 October 1973
- Preceded by: Veerendra Patil
- Succeeded by: Office Abolished

Member of the Karnataka Legislative Assembly Hunasuru
- In office 1952–1957
- Preceded by: Constituency established
- Succeeded by: N. Rachaiah
- In office 1962–1967
- Preceded by: N. Rachaiah
- Succeeded by: D. V. Devaraj
- In office 1978 – 6 June 1982
- Preceded by: U. Kariyappa Gowda
- Succeeded by: Chandra Prabha Arasu

Personal details
- Born: 20 August 1915 Kallahalli, Kingdom of Mysore, British India
- Died: 6 June 1982 (aged 66)
- Party: Karnataka Kranti Ranga
- Other political affiliations: Indian National Congress (1952–1969); Indian National Congress (R) (1971–1977); Indian National Congress (I) (1978–1979); Indian National Congress (S) (1979–1982)
- Spouse: Chikkammanni
- Children: 3
- Relatives: Kemparaj Urs (brother)

Devaraj Devaraj Arasu (20 August 1915 – 6 June 1982) was an Indian politician who served two terms as the Chief Minister of Karnataka (1972–77, 1978–80). He is the second longest serving Chief Minister of Karnataka in terms of days of tenure in office after Siddaramaiah. He entered politics in 1952 and was an MLA for 10 years. When the Indian National Congress split in 1969 as Samstha (Congress(O)) and Indira Congress (Congress (R)), he stood with Indira Gandhi. He became the Chief Minister of Karnataka (fifth Assembly) for the first time from 20 March 1972 to 31 December 1977 and again from 17 March 1978 to 8 June 1980 (sixth Assembly).

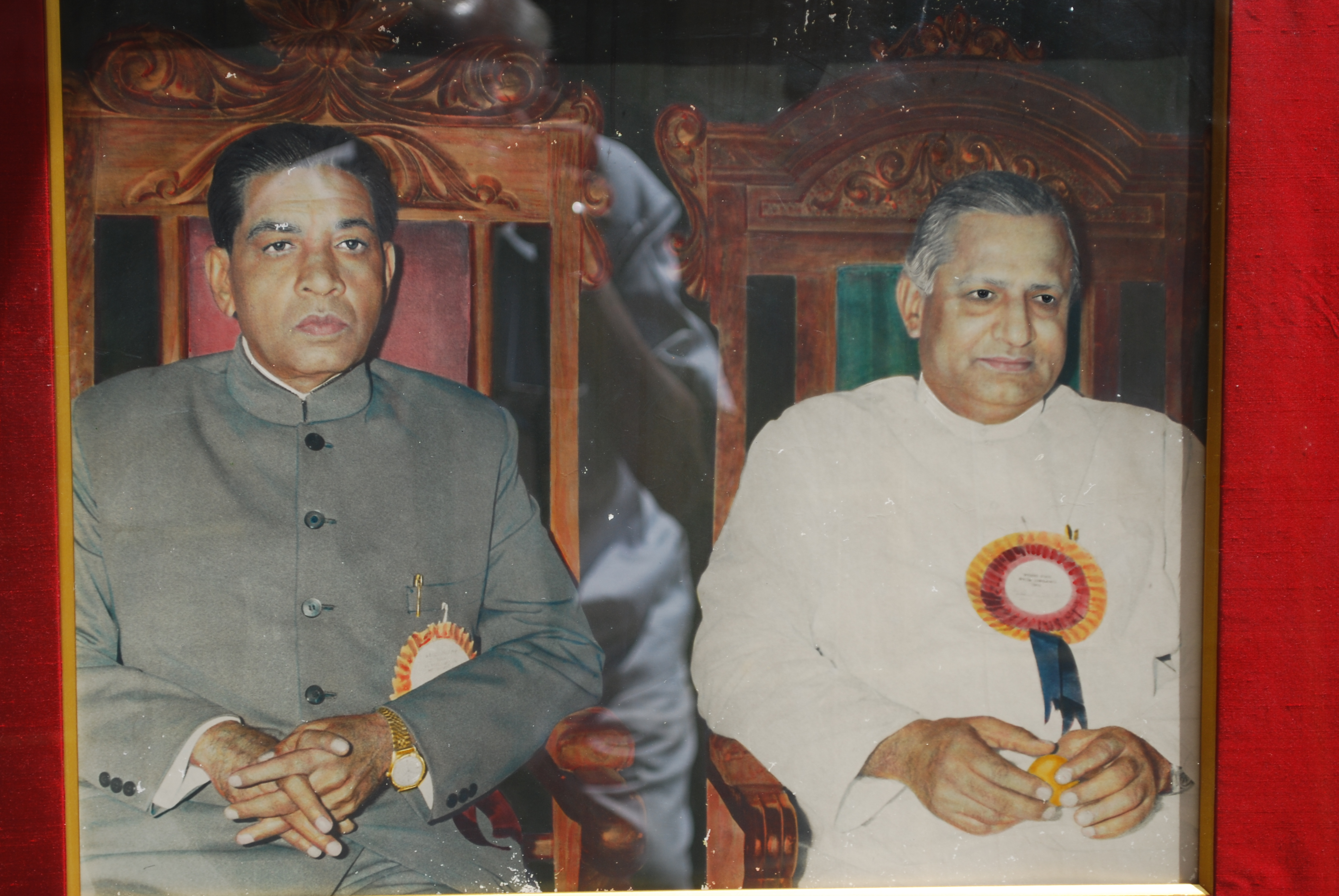
Devaraj Urs with industrialist Dr. M.S. Ramaiah

== Early life ==
D. Devaraj Arasu was born at Kallahalli Hunsur Taluk, Mysore district, the then Kingdom of Mysore. His father, also named Devaraj Arasu, was a land-owner and his mother, Devira Ammanni, was a pious and traditional lady. His younger brother, Kemparaj was an actor. The family belonged to the Arasu community and were very distant relatives to the Wodeyar royal family.

Arasu was married to 11-year-old Chikkammanni (or Chikka Ammani), a girl from his own community and from a suitable family, in a match arranged by their parents when he was almost 15. The marriage proved to be harmonious and conventional. They had three daughters – Chandra Prabha, Nagrathna and Bharathi.

Arasu had his primary and high school education at the Arasu Boarding School in Mysore, which had been set up by the Maharaja of Mysore expressly to provide suitable education to the sons of the Arasu community, to equip them for higher responsibilities in their adulthood. After passing school, Arasu studied at the Central College in Bengaluru and took a BSc Degree. After completing his education, Arasu returned to Kallahalli and engaged himself in agriculture, overseeing the extensive lands owned by his family.

== Politics ==
Arasu entered politics in 1952 by contesting the first elections held in the country after it attained independence. At this time, the Maharaja was still the head of state in Mysore (until 1956), the state retained the same boundaries as before independence, and the Arasu community was entrenched in the countryside due to centuries of ties with village communities. Arasu was elected from Hunasuru constituency to the state legislature and served as a member of the legislative assembly for ten years (two successive terms). As the Indian National Congress party leader from Mysore State, Arasu was a member of the intra-party "Syndicate" of powerful regional leaders. However, he was never as antagonistic towards Prime Minister Indira Gandhi as other leaders of the Syndicate, such as K. Kamaraj. When the first Congress split took place in 1969, and the Syndicate formed the Congress (O) ('O' for "Organization") while Indira Gandhi formed the Congress (R), he chose to abandon the Syndicate and go with Indira Gandhi.

The Congress (O), under S. Nijalingappa, Veerendra Patil, Ramakrishna Hegde and Deve Gowda dominated Karnataka electorally and had a majority in the state assembly. Arasu led the Congress (R) in the state and helped win all the 27 seats at the 1971 Lok Sabha elections. Under his leadership Congress(R) won 165/216 seats in the 1972 legislative assembly elections, thus garnering more than 75% of the seats. Congress(O) came a distant second with 24 seats. Independents won 20 seats. CPI won 3 while BJS, the earlier avatar of BJP, stood second in 16 seats, winning none. He was chief minister of Karnataka for the full term of the assembly from 1972 to December 1977. In January 1978, he joined Congress (I) as Mrs Gandhi split the party yet again. The new party won the assembly elections in February 1978 and Arasu was appointed Chief Minister. But in 1979, he left Congress(I) following differences with Indira Gandhi, and joined the other Congress faction, Congress (S). He continued to be CM as many MLAs joined him. The other Congress faction was even known as Congress (Arasu) briefly when he became its president. But in the 1980 Lok Sabha elections, his party won just one seat in Karnataka. Most MLAs in his camp deserted him to re-join Congress(I) and Gundu Rao became Chief Minister in January 1980. Arasu then formed the Karnataka Kranti Ranga in 1982, a few months before his death.

== Tenure as Chief Minister of Karnataka ==
Devaraj Arasu tenure is particularly remembered for his reforms that targeted the depressed classes of Karnataka, namely the scheduled castes and the other backward castes.

In response to the prime minister's declaration that poverty was her first priority ("Garibi Hatao!") and her Twenty-Point Programme, Arasu formed a state cabinet dominated by technocrats and academics. His priority was land reform, and his slogan was "Land to the tiller"; under him a sustained effort was made to equalize the land distribution through much of the state. Karnataka, thus, other than the communist bastions of Kerala and West Bengal, has had one of the most successful land redistributions in the country. A side-effect of this was to break the hold of the previously dominant Lingayat and Vokkaliga castes over local politics. He was helped in his endeavours by his colleagues Huchamasti Gowda, B Subbayya Shetty and others from his cabinet.

Other schemes included the building of shelters for migrant workers; the pardon of rural debt; and, in a populist masterstroke, a plan to have an electric bulb in every house. When R. K. Baliga, founder of Electronics City proposed the concept of developing the electronic city in the early 1970s it was met with skepticism but Devaraj Arasu made him the Chairman of the Karnataka State Electronics Development Corporation (Keonics) in 1976. In 1978 Keonics established Electronics City on 332 acres (1.34 km^{2}) in Konappana Agrahara and Doddathogur village, near Bangalore.

In 1979, however, he exited Congress (I). He had quarrelled with Indira Gandhi, and was appearing before the Supreme Court in Karnataka vs. Union of India, and thus felt the time was right to cut his losses and leave the Congress. This was a miscalculation because although many legislators in Karnataka, Kerala and Goa went with him – such as A. K. Antony, Priyaranjan Das Munshi and K. P. Unnikrishnan – Mrs. Gandhi swept back to power at the national level and the fledgling Congress (Arasu) was routed. Arasu subsequently joined the Janata Party, and his protégé Ramakrishna Hegde recaptured power in Karnataka from the Congress in 1984. The Congress (Arasu) itself became Congress (S) in 1983.

== Dates in power ==
During the Fifth Assembly of Karnataka State, D. Devaraj Arasu was the Chief Minister from 20-03-1972 to 31-12-1977. President's Rule was imposed from 31-12-1977 to 28-02-1978 in the run-up to 1978 election. The Sixth Assembly lasted its five-year term, from 17 March 1978 to 8 June 1983. Devraj Arasu was Chief Minister from 28-02-1978 to 07-01-1980, first with Congress(I) up to 24 June 1979, and then Congress (S) when he was expelled from Congress(I) following differences with Indira Gandhi. When Mrs Gandhi swept to power in Delhi in January 1980, most of the MLAs backing him re-joined Congress(I). Devaraj Arasu was ousted and succeeded by R. Gundu Rao as CM in January 1980.

- 20-03-1972 to 31-12-1977. Karnataka CM (Congress)
- 28-02-1978 to July 1979. Karnataka CM (Congress (Indira))
- July 1979 to 7 January 1980. Karnataka CM (Congress(Socialist))

== Legacy ==
Devarj Arasu was the first person from backward classes to hold the Chief Minister post in Karnataka during 1972-1977. For previous 25 years i.e. from 1947 to 1972, erstwhile Mysuru state's Chief Minister post was held by persons only from either dominant Okkaliga or Lingayat communities. Thus, Devaraj Arasu broke this dominance of two communities wrt. Chief Minister post with the support of Indira Gandhi, then Prime Minister of India.

He is the first Chief Minister of Karnataka/Mysore state to complete the five year term during 1972-1977. As of 2025, he is the longest serving Chief Minister of Karnataka in terms of tenure i.e. 7 years and 238 days.

D. Devaraj Arasu was a social reformer. Arasu espoused the causes of poor and ushered in a "silent social revolution" in Karnataka. He was the voice of the poor and stood for the cause of the downtrodden in society. Devaraj Arasu was elected continuously from Hunasuru as an MLA for 28 years, from 1952 to 1980. The land reforms spearheaded by him, in which the tiller of the land became the owner, was exemplary. It reduced the chasm between the rich and the poor, doing away with social inequality. Mysore district had the highest incidents of bonded labour in India during that time and the decision of the Arasu Government to abolish it was remarkable. Arasu must be remembered for his achievements in weaning away poor people from the clutches of the rich moneylenders. His measures brought several changes but his land reforms brought poverty to many families who were solely dependent on their small land holdings.

The deeds of the late Chief Minister in the irrigation sector too had helped the farmer community tremendously. The Kali project, one of them, was executed amidst opposition from several quarters. Among the contributions of the late Chief Minister was the stress laid on the education of the people belonging to the backward classes and establishment of the backwards and minorities hostels for the students hailing from those sections of society. Absorbing 16,000 unemployed graduates in the stipendiary scheme whose services were confirmed later, abolition of carrying night soil by Dalits and bonded labour. During his tenure, in 1977, separate Backward classes and Minority department, and Karnataka Backward classes development corporation were formed. For these reasons, Devaraj Arasu respectfully known as "Reformer of Backward classes" in Karnataka. Renaming Mysuru state as Karnataka in 1973 were some landmark decisions taken by him.

Devaraj Arasu introduced many backward classes persons to politics. Decade after his Chief Ministership, many backward classes persons held Chief Minister post in Karnataka politics viz. Sarekoppa Bangarappa, Veerappa Moily, Siddaramaiah in the Okkaliga and Lingayat communities dominated politics in Karnataka.
