= Bagalkot Lok Sabha constituency =

Lok Sabha constituency in Karnataka

Coordinates: 16.2°N 75.7°E

Bagalkot
- Lok Sabha constituency
- Bagalkot Lok Sabha constituency map

Constituency details
- Country: India
- Region: South India
- State: Karnataka
- Assembly constituencies: Mudhol; Terdal; Jamkhandi; Bilgi; Badami; Bagalkot; Hungund; Nargund
- Established: 1967
- Reservation: None

Member of Parliament
- 18th Lok Sabha
- Incumbent Gaddigoudar Parvatagouda Chandanagouda
- Party: Bharatiya Janata Party
- Elected year: 2019

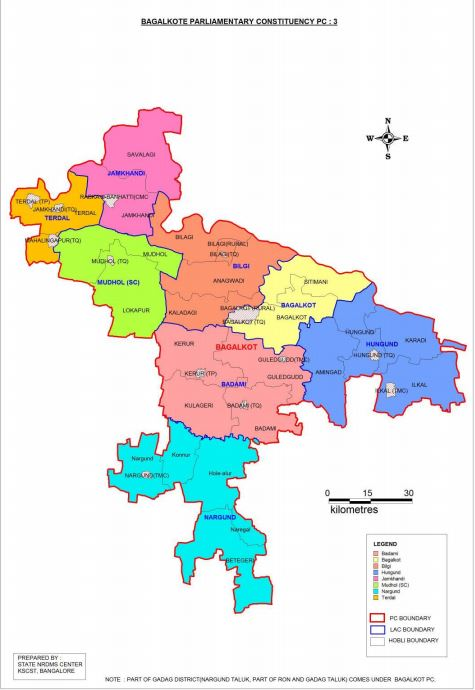

Bagalkot Lok Sabha constituency is one of the 28 Lok Sabha constituencies in Karnataka state in southern India. This constituency came into existence in 1967. Sanganagouda Basanagouda Patil, was the first Member of Parliament.

== Assembly segments ==
Presently, Bagalkot Lok Sabha constituency comprises the following eight legislative assembly segments:

No (Note: Constituency number)	Name	District	MLA, from 2023	MLA's Party	Party Leading (in 2024 Lok Sabha)
19	Mudhol (SC)	Bagalkot	R. B. Timmapur	INC	BJP
20	Terdal	Bagalkot	Siddu Savadi	BJP	BJP
21	Jamkhandi	Bagalkot	Jagadish Gudaguntimath	BJP	BJP
22	Bilgi	Bagalkot	J. T. Patil	INC	BJP
23	Badami	Bagalkot	Bhimsen Chimmanakatti	INC	BJP
24	Bagalkot	Bagalkot	U. H. Meti	INC	BJP
25	Hungund	Bagalkot	Vijayanand Kashappanavar	INC	BJP
68	Nargund	Gadag	C. C. Patil	BJP	INC

== Members of Parliament ==
Year	Member	Party
1952-67 : See Bijapur South
1967	Sanganagouda Patil	Indian National Congress
1971	Sanganagouda Patil	Indian National Congress
1977	Sanganagouda Patil	Indian National Congress
1980	Veerendra Patil	Indian National Congress (I)
1984	Hanmantagouda Patil	Indian National Congress
1989	Subhash Patil	Indian National Congress
1991	Siddu Nyamagouda	Indian National Congress
1996	H. Y. Meti	Janata Dal
1998	Ajaykumar Sarnaik	Lok Shakti
1999	R. S. Patil	Indian National Congress
2004	P. C. Gaddigoudar	Bharatiya Janata Party
2009	P. C. Gaddigoudar	Bharatiya Janata Party
2014	P. C. Gaddigoudar	Bharatiya Janata Party
2019	P. C. Gaddigoudar	Bharatiya Janata Party
2024	P. C. Gaddigoudar	Bharatiya Janata Party

== Election results ==
=== General Election 2024 ===
2024 Indian general election: Bagalkot
Party	Candidate	Votes	%	±%
BJP	P. C. Gaddigoudar	671,039	50.93	▼4.24
INC	Samyukta Shivanand Patil	6,02,640	45.74	▲4.53
NOTA	None of the above	3,420	0.26	▼0.68
Majority		68,399	5.19	▼8.77
Turnout		13,19,713	72.91	
BJP hold		Swing	▼4.24	

=== General Election 2019 ===
2019 Indian general elections: Bagalkot
Party	Candidate	Votes	%	±%
BJP	Parvatagouda Gaddigoudar	664,638	55.17	
INC	Veena Kashappanavar	4,96,451	41.21	
NOTA	None of the above	11,328	0.94	
RPI	Parashuram Laxman Neelnaik	7,486	0.62	
Majority		1,68,187	13.96	
Turnout		12,04,702	70.70	
BJP hold		Swing		

=== General election 2014 ===
2014 Indian general elections: Bagalkot
Party	Candidate	Votes	%	±%
BJP	Parvatagouda Gaddigoudar	571,548	52.95	
INC	Ajay Kumar Sarnaik	4,54,988	42.16	
IND.	Shankar Bidari	10,959	1.02	
NOTA	None of the above	10,764	1.00	
Majority		1,16,560	10.80	
Turnout		10,79,324	68.81	
BJP hold		Swing		

== See also ==
- Bagalkot district
- List of constituencies of the Lok Sabha
