= Fourth Nijalingappa ministry =

Government of Mysore, India (1967–68)

- 9th Council of Ministers of Mysore State
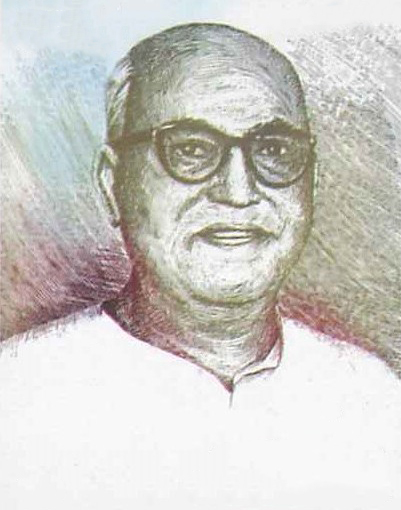
- S. Nijalingappa
- Date formed: 15 March 1967
- Date dissolved: 28 May 1968

People and organisations
- Head of state: V. V. Giri (2 April 1965 – 13 May 1967); Gopal Swarup Pathak (13 May 1967 – 30 August 1969)
- Head of government: S. Nijalingappa
- Member parties: Indian National Congress
- Status in legislature: Majority
- Opposition party: Praja Socialist Party
- Opposition leader: S. Shivappa (assembly)

History
- Election: 1967
- Outgoing election: 1972 (After First Veerendra Patil ministry)
- Legislature terms: 6 years (Council); 5 years (Assembly)
- Predecessor: Third Nijalingappa ministry
- Successor: First Veerendra Patil ministry

Fourth S. Nijalingappa Ministry was the Council of Ministers in Mysore, a state in South India headed by S. Nijalingappa of the Indian National Congress.

The ministry had multiple ministers including the Chief Minister. All ministers belonged to the Indian National Congress.

S. Nijalingappa became Chief Minister of Mysore after Indian National Congress emerged victorious 1967 Mysore elections.

== Chief Minister & Cabinet Ministers ==
S.No	Portfolio	Name	Portrait	Constituency	Term of Office		Party
1	Chief Minister *Other departments not allocated to any Minister.	S. Nijalingappa		Bagalkot	15 March 1967	28 May 1968	Indian National Congress
2	Health	Kalastavadi Puttaswamy		Mysore	15 March 1967	28 May 1968	Indian National Congress
3	Finance	Ramakrishna Hegde		Haliyal	15 March 1967	28 May 1968	Indian National Congress
4	Housing; Labour?; Transport?; Sericulture?; Animal Husbandary?	D. Devaraj Urs		Hunasuru	15 March 1967	28 May 1968	Indian National Congress
5	Public Works Department	Veerendra Patil		Chincholi	15 March 1967	28 May 1968	Indian National Congress
6	Law; Parliamentary Affairs	S. R. Kanthi		Hungund	15 March 1967	28 May 1968	Indian National Congress
7	Revenue; Forest	B. Rachaiah		Santhemarahalli	15 March 1967	28 May 1968	Indian National Congress

== See also ==
- Mysore Legislative Assembly
- Mysore Legislative Council
- Politics of Mysore
