= First Veerendra Patil ministry =

Government of Mysore, India (1968–1971)

- 10th Council of Ministers of Mysore State
- Date formed: 29 May 1968
- Date dissolved: 18 March 1971

People and organisations
- Head of state: Gopal Swarup Pathak (13 May 1967 – 30 August 1969); Dharma Vira (23 October 1970 – 1 February 1972); Mohanlal Sukhadia (1 February 1972 – 10 January 1975)
- Head of government: Veerendra Patil
- Member parties: Indian National Congress (Organisation)
- Status in legislature: Majority
- Opposition party: Indian National Congress (R)
- Opposition leader: H. Siddaveerappa (assembly)

History
- Election: 1967
- Outgoing election: 1972
- Legislature terms: 6 years (Council); 5 years (Assembly)
- Predecessor: Fourth Nijalingappa ministry
- Successor: First Urs ministry

Veerendra Patil was the Council of Ministers in Mysore, a state in South India headed by Veerendra Patil of the Indian National Congress.

The ministry had multiple ministers including the Chief Minister of Mysore. All ministers belonged to the Indian National Congress (Organisation).

Veerendra Patil became Chief minister after incumbent Chief Minister of Mysore S. Nijalingappa moved to federal politics and became President of All India Congress Committee. Meanwhile, Nijalingappa chose Patil as his successor.

== Chief Minister & Cabinet Ministers ==
S.No	Name	MLA/MLC	Constituency	Designation	Portfolio	Party	Term of Office	
Chief Minister
1.	Veerendra Patil	MLA	Chincholi	Chief Minister	Other departments not allocated to any Minister	INC(O)	29 May 1968	18 March 1971
Cabinet Minister
2.	Ramakrishna Hegde	MLA	Haliyal	Cabinet Minister	Finance	INC(O)	29 May 1968	18 March 1971
3.	Kalastavadi Puttaswamy	MLA	Chamundeshwari	Cabinet Minister	Labour; Law; Parliamentary affairs.	INC(O)	29 May 1968	18 March 1971
4.	K. V. Shankaregowda	MLC	MLAs	Cabinet Minister	Education	INC(O)	29 May 1968	18 March 1971
5.	M. Rajasekara Murthy	MLA	T. Narsipur	Cabinet Minister	Industry; Information; Publicity; Film Development	INC(O)	29 May 1968	18 March 1971
6.	V. L. Patil	MLA	Raibag	Cabinet Minister	Social Welfare	INC(O)	29 May 1968	18 March 1971
7.	Y. Ramakrishna	MLA	Uttarahalli	Cabinet Minister	Health	INC(O)	29 May 1968	18 March 1971
8.	P. M. Nadagouda	MLC	MLAs	Cabinet Minister	Development	INC(O)	29 May 1968	18 March 1971
9.	B. Rachaiah	MLA	Santhemarahalli	Cabinet Minister	Agriculture; Horticulture	INC(O)	29 May 1968	18 March 1971
10.	Basangouda Mallana Gouda	MLA	Bijapur	Minister of State	Municipal Administration	INC(O)	29 May 1968	18 March 1971
11.	Andanappa Doddameti	MLA	Ron	Minister of State	Minor Irrigation	INC(O)	29 May 1968	18 March 1971

== See also ==
- Mysore Legislative Assembly
- Mysore Legislative Council
- Politics of Mysore
