= Anand Nyamagouda =

Former Member of Karnataka Legislative Assembly

Anand Siddu Nyamagouda

Member of the Karnataka Legislative Assembly
- In office 2018–2023
- Preceded by: Siddu Nyamagouda
- Succeeded by: Jagadish Gudagunti
- Constituency: Jamkhandi

Personal details
- Born: 1983
- Political party: Indian National Congress
- Parent: Siddu Nyamagouda (father)
- Education: MBA
- Occupation: Politician, agriculturist

Anand Nyamagouda (born 1983) is an Indian politician and agriculturist who serves as the chairman of Jamakhandi Sugars Ltd. He is the son of the late Siddu Nyamagouda, a senior Congress leader and former Minister of State for Coal in the Government of India.

Anand was elected to the 2018 Karnataka Legislative Assembly election as the Indian National Congress candidate for the Jamkhandi constituency in the 2018 election and served as the Leader of the Opposition from 4–21 March 2021.

== Early life ==
Anand Nyamagouda was born in 1983 to Siddu Nyamagouda, who was known for building India's first private dam in 1989. The dam, named Shrama Bindu Sagar, is built across the Krishna River at Chikkapadasalagi village in Jamakhandi. Anand received his MBA in Finance from Bangalore University.

== Political career ==
Anand entered politics following the death of his father in a car accident. Siddu Nyamagouda was a veteran Congress leader, a two-time MLA, and served as the Minister of State for Coal in P. V. Narasimha Rao's cabinet. After his father's death, a by-election was held in the Jamkhandi constituency.

Anand contested the by-election under pressure from party workers and local residents, and he was elected as the Indian National Congress candidate with 97,017 votes. He also served briefly as the Leader of the Opposition from 4–21 March 2021.
