= Gurupadagouda Patil =

Indian politician

G. S. Patil
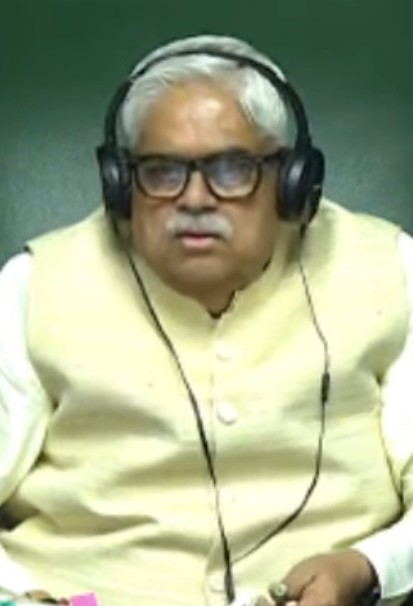
- Patil in 2026

18th Speaker of Karnataka Legislative Assembly
- Incumbent
- Assumed office 14 August 2026
- Chief Minister: D. K. Shivakumar
- Preceded by: U. T. Khader

Member of the Karnataka Legislative Assembly
- Incumbent
- Assumed office 2023
- Preceded by: Kalakappa Gurushantappa Bandi
- Constituency: Ron
- In office 2013–2018
- Preceded by: Kalakappa Gurushantappa Bandi
- Succeeded by: Kalakappa Gurushantappa Bandi
- Constituency: Ron
- In office 1999–2004
- Preceded by: Bidarur Shrishailappa Virupaxappa
- Succeeded by: Kalakappa Gurushantappa Bandi
- Constituency: Ron
- In office 1989–1994
- Preceded by: Doddameti Jananadev Shivanagappa
- Succeeded by: Bidarur Shrishailappa Virupaxappa
- Constituency: Ron

Personal details
- Born: Gurupadagouda Sanganagouda Patil; 10 April 1948 (age 78) Ron, Gadag district, Mysore State, India
- Party: Indian National Congress
- Parent: Patil (father)
- Education: Bachelor of Arts
- Occupation: Politician

Gurupadagouda Sanganagouda Patil (born 1948) is an Indian politician from Karnataka. He is a four time MLA from Ron Assembly constituency in Gadag district. He won the 2023 Karnataka Legislative Assembly election representing Indian National Congress.

G.S. Patil has been appointed as Chairman for Karnataka Renewable Energy Development Ltd in 2016.

He was appointed chairman for Mineral Development Corporation on 26 January 2024.

== Early life and education ==
Patil is from Ron, Gadag district. His father Sanganagouda Basanagouda Patil was a farmer and a former M.P. from Bijapur South Lok Sabha constituency. He completed his Class 12 and discontinued his B.Sc. while at Karnatak Science College, Dharwad.

== Career ==
Patil won the Ron Assembly constituency representing Indian National College in the 2023 Karnataka Legislative Assembly election. He polled 94,865 votes and defeated his nearest rival, Kalakappa Bandi of Bharatiya Janata Party, by a margin of 24,688 votes. He was first elected to Ron seat as an Indian National Congress candidate in 1989 Karnataka Legislative Assembly election and regained it for the second time in the 1999 Assembly election. Then, he lost to Kalakappa when he contested the 2004 Assembly election and again in 2009 Assembly election. However, he tasted victory for the third time as he won the 2013 Karnataka Legislative Assembly election representing Indian National Congress and defeated Kalakappa Bandi of BJP by a margin of votes. Their rivalry continued in 2018 as Kalakappa won the poll but again Patil regained it in the 2023 election to become an MLA for the fourth time.
