= Kiranagi =

- village
- Country: India
- State: Karnataka
- District: Gulbarga
- Talukas: Gulbarga

Population (2001)
  - Total: 5,658

Languages
  - Official: Kannada
- Time zone: UTC+5:30 (IST)

Kiranagi is a village in the southern state of Karnataka, India. It is located in the Gulbarga taluk of Kalaburagi district in Karnataka.

It is said that during the Indo-China war in 1962, the then Karnataka chief minister Veerendra Patil (1924-1997) visited Kirangi village in Gulbarga district in a Statewide campaign for raising funds for the government. Hearing about the cause, the villagers of Kirangi reacted with a surge of patriotism and mobilised more than 100 tolas of gold within an hour and handed over the donation to Patil. The chief minister was astounded by the prosperity of the village and the large-heartedness of the community. He immediately gave Kirangi a new name: Honna Kirangi (Honnu meaning gold).

== Demographics ==
As of 2001 India census, Kiranagi had a population of 5658 with 2903 males and 2755 females.

== See also ==
- Gulbarga
- Districts of Karnataka
