= Kalastavadi Puttaswamy =

Indian politician

K. Puttaswamy
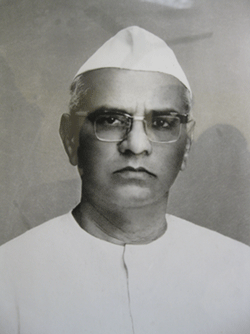

Minister of Labour, Law and Parliamentary affairs, Government of Karnataka
- In office 29 May 1968 – 18 March 1971
- Chief Minister: Veerendra Patil

Minister of Health and Housing, Government of Karnataka
- In office 15 March 1967 – 28 May 1968
- Chief Minister: S. Nijalingappa

Minister of Co-operation and Housing, Government of Karnataka
- In office 1965 – 28 February 1967
- Chief Minister: S. Nijalingappa

Minister of Municipal administration, Government of Karnataka
- In office 1962–1965
- Chief Minister: S. Nijalingappa

Member of Karnataka Legislative Assembly
- In office March 1978 – 30 April 1978
- Preceded by: Seat established
- Succeeded by: B. N. Kengegowda
- Constituency: Chamaraja
- In office 1967–1977
- Preceded by: Himself (as MLA of Mysore)
- Succeeded by: D. Jayadevaraja Urs
- Constituency: Chamundeshwari
- In office 1957–1967
- Preceded by: Shivananje Gowda (as MLA of Mysore Taluk)
- Succeeded by: Himself (as MLA of Chamundeshwari)
- Constituency: Mysore
- In office 1951–1957
- Preceded by: Seat established
- Succeeded by: A. G. Chunche Gowda
- Constituency: Shrirangapattana

Personal details
- Born: 1917 Arakere, Kingdom of Mysore
- Died: 30 April 1978 (aged 60–61)
- Party: Indian National Congress
- Other political affiliations: Congress for Democracy (1977–1978)
- Spouse: Jayalakshamma (m. 1943)
- Children: 3

Kalastavadi Puttaswamy (1917 – 1978) was an Indian independence activist, lawyer, politician and educationist. A member of the Indian National Congress (INC), he was elected to the Karnataka Legislative Assembly for a then record seven times, having won every assembly election from 1952 until his death in 1978. Puttaswamy held multiple cabinet portfolios under the chief ministership of S. Nijalingappa and Veerendra Patil.

Born in 1917 in Arakere, Kingdom of Mysore, Puttaswamy studied law and began legal practice in Mysore in 1942. During this time, he was also actively involved in the Indian nationalist movement. An association with INC leader Sahukar Chennaiah gradually led Puttaswamy to take an interest in electoral politics, and was elected to the Constituent Assembly post-independence in 1948. Four years later, he was elected to the Mysore Legislative Assembly from Shrirangapattana on an INC ticket. Subsequently, he successfully contested the Mysore, Chamundeshwari and Chamaraja seats in the assembly. As an educationist, Puttaswamy founded the Vidyavardhaka Sangha in Mysore.

== Early life ==
Puttaswamy was born in 1917 to an agriculturist family of Vokkaligas, as the first son of Kalastavadi Lingegowda and Lingamma. He was born in Arakere of the erstwhile Kingdom of Mysore (in present-day Mandya district of Karnataka, India). Kalastavadi is a village off the Mysore–Srirangapatna road where Lingegowda was born before he settled in Arakere. However, he went by the name Kalastavadi Lingegowda, and the prefix stuck to his son's name too.

Puttaswamy completed his primary education in Arekere before moving to Mysore, where he completing his matriculation. He later enrolled at Maharaja's College for intermediate and bachelor of arts (honours) studies. During this time, he became actively involved in the independence movement, and participated in the 1938 flag satyagraha in Shivapura. After securing a degree in law from Pune, Puttaswamy returned to Mysore in 1942 to begin his legal career. The following year, he married Jayalakshamma, who was a relative of an Indian National Congress (INC) leader Sahukar Chennaiah. This alliance would later bring Puttaswamy closer to key political circles in the Mysore region.

== Career ==
Puttaswamy's legal practice began under H. C. Dasappa, a senior politician and lawyer during the time. He later established independent practice while also serving public offices as a politician. He was urged to enter electoral politics by Chennaiah. This led to him contesting successfully the Mandya District Board elections in 1946. In 1948, he was elected to the Constituent Assembly from Mysore. Four years later, he was elected to the Mysore Legislative Assembly from Shrirangapattana with an INC ticket. At the next election, he contested Mysore and won, which he would retain in 1962. He contested the Mysore seat owing to his popularity on the back of his successful campaign to the presidency of the Mysore City Corporation (then a municipal council). By 1962, Chennaiah had left the INC to co-found the Janata Party while Puttaswamy stayed.

Puttaswamy's re-election to the assembly and the formation of the INC government led to his appointment as cabinet minister. He was handed the municipal administration portfolio in the Nijalingappa cabinet. Between 1965 and 1967, he held the cooperation and housing portfolios. In 1967, he entered the assembly from Chamundeshwari, and was appointed the minister for housing and health in the fourth Nijalingappa cabinet. In his final stint as cabinet minister, between 1968 and 1971, he held the labour, law and parliamentary affairs portfolios in the Veerendra Patil ministry. Ahead of the 1972 election, Puttaswamy joined the Indira Gandhi faction of the INC following the party's split, and retained his assembly seat from Chamundeshwari. For the 1978 election, he successfully contested the Chamaraja seat with a ticket of Congress for Democracy, a party formed by Jagjivan Ram. In the process, he was elected to the assembly for the seventh time. However, a month after being elected, Puttaswamy died from cardiac arrest, on 30 April 1978.

=== Vidyavardhaka Sangha ===
In 1948, Puttaswamy founded the Vidyavardhaka Sangha, intending to provide affordable education, in Mysore. Initially, an industrial training institute was established in its premises, before the educational institute was started. In 1974, her served as principal of its law college. An engineering college, the Vidyavardhaka College of Engineering, and nine other institutions exist today governed by the Vidyavardhaka Sangha.

== Personal life ==
Puttaswamy and Jayalakshamma had three children together: daughter Prameela, and sons Chandrashekhar and Vishwanath. Chandrashekhar is a physician, while Vishwanath serves as secretary of the Vidyavardhaka Sangha. Vishwanath previously served as the first mayor of the Mysore City Corporation, from 1983 to 1984.
