= Guledgud Assembly constituency =

Former Assembly constituency in Karnataka, India

Coordinates: 16.049356°N 75.790899°E

Guledgud
- Former constituency No. 215 for the Karnataka Legislative Assembly

Constituency details
- Country: India
- Region: South India
- State: Karnataka
- Division: Belagavi
- District: Bagalkot
- Lok Sabha constituency: Bagalkot
- Established: 1957
- Abolished: 2008
- Reservation: None

Guledgud Assembly constituency Vidhan Sabha seat was one of the constituencies in Karnataka state assembly in India until 2008 when it was made defunct. It was part of Bagalkot Lok Sabha constituency.

== Members of the Legislative Assembly ==
Election	Member	Party
1952	Madivalappa Rudrappa Pattanshetti	Indian National Congress
1957	Madivalappa Rudrappa Pattanshetti	Indian National Congress
1962	Madivalappa Rudrappa Pattanshetti	Indian National Congress
1967	P. M. Rudrappa	Indian National Congress
1972	G. P. Nanjayyanamath	Indian National Congress
1975 By-election (Note: Died on 20/03/1975)	B. M. Horakeri	Indian National Congress
1978	Janali Basanagouda Veeranagouda	Indian National Congress
1983	Banni Mallikarjun Veerappa	Bharatiya Janata Party
1985	Shankrayya Gadigayya Nanjayynmath	Indian National Congress
1989	H. Y. Meti	Janata Dal
1994	H. Y. Meti	Janata Dal
1996 By-election (Note: Resigned on 27/05/1996)	Rajashekhar Veeranna Sheelavant	Bharatiya Janata Party
1999	Shankrayya Gadigayya Nanjayynmath	Indian National Congress
2004	H. Y. Meti	Janata Dal

== Election results ==
=== Assembly Election 2004 ===
2004 Karnataka Legislative Assembly election : Guledgud
Party	Candidate	Votes	%	±%
JD(S)	H. Y. Meti	30,832	34.80%	▲9.12
BJP	Rajashekhar Veeranna Sheelavant	29,426	33.22%	▲8.14
INC	Shankrayya Gadigayya Nanjayynmath	23,520	26.55%	▼20.23
Independent	Hoolageri Mallappa Kapaleppa	2,009	2.27%	New
BSP	Shirur Basalingappa Guralingappa	1,583	1.79%	New
Kannada Nadu Party	Baragundi Basappa Gurusangappa	1,215	1.37%	New
Margin of victory		1,406	1.59%	▼19.51
Turnout		88,635	63.79%	▼5.05
Total valid votes		88,585		
Registered electors		138,946		▲14.36
JD(S) gain from INC		Swing	▼11.98	

=== Assembly Election 1999 ===
1999 Karnataka Legislative Assembly election : Guledgud
Party	Candidate	Votes	%	±%
INC	Shankrayya Gadigayya Nanjayynmath	37,029	46.78%	▲21.35
JD(S)	H. Y. Meti	20,326	25.68%	New
BJP	Rajashekhar Veeranna Sheelavant	19,848	25.08%	▼22.18
Independent	Goudar Umesh Yalagurdappa	1,948	2.46%	New
Margin of victory		16,703	21.10%	▼0.73
Turnout		83,642	68.84%	▲3.24
Total valid votes		79,151		
Rejected ballots		4,467	5.34%	▲3.01
Registered electors		121,496		▲2.38
INC gain from BJP		Swing	▼0.48	

=== Assembly By-election 1996 ===
1996 Karnataka Legislative Assembly by-election : Guledgud
Party	Candidate	Votes	%	±%
BJP	Rajashekhar Veeranna Sheelavant	35,932	47.26%	▲17.64
INC	Hulageri Mallanna Kapaleppa	19,337	25.43%	▲7.09
JD	Raveendra Pralhad Kalaburgi	18,047	23.74%	▼11.85
Independent	Kazi Kutubuddin Bashasab	2,580	3.39%	New
Margin of victory		16,595	21.83%	▲15.86
Turnout		77,849	65.60%	▼0.44
Total valid votes		76,034		
Rejected ballots		1,815	2.33%	▼0.82
Registered electors		118,673		▲1.74
BJP gain from JD		Swing	▲11.67	

=== Assembly Election 1994 ===
1994 Karnataka Legislative Assembly election : Guledgud
Party	Candidate	Votes	%	±%
JD	H. Y. Meti	26,549	35.59%	▼9.54
BJP	Rajashekhar Veeranna Sheelavant	22,093	29.62%	▲24.02
INC	Janali Basanagouda Veeranagouda	13,679	18.34%	▼24.10
INC	Adin Mallappa Chinnappa	7,895	10.58%	New
Kranti Sabha	Ramanna Hanamantappa Radder	2,529	3.39%	▲0.80
Independent	Umachagi Ravindranath Shanmukappa	642	0.86%	New
Independent	Hiremath Gangayya Sangayya	510	0.68%	New
Margin of victory		4,456	5.97%	▲3.28
Turnout		77,023	66.04%	▼1.59
Total valid votes		74,593		
Rejected ballots		2,430	3.15%	▼2.43
Registered electors		116,639		▲3.72
JD hold		Swing	▼9.54	

=== Assembly Election 1989 ===
1989 Karnataka Legislative Assembly election : Guledgud
Party	Candidate	Votes	%	±%
JD	H. Y. Meti	32,411	45.13%	New
INC	Shankrayya Gadigayya Nanjayynmath	30,479	42.44%	▼1.50
BJP	Hanamanthgouda Sheshanagouda Patil	4,022	5.60%	▼4.40
Kranti Sabha	Madhusudan Srikrisandas Tiwari	1,863	2.59%	New
JP	Indi Huchchappa Basappa	1,204	1.68%	New
Margin of victory		1,932	2.69%	▲0.05
Turnout		76,051	67.63%	▼3.34
Total valid votes		71,811		
Rejected ballots		4,240	5.58%	▲2.99
Registered electors		112,456		▲22.55
JD gain from INC		Swing	▲1.19	

=== Assembly Election 1985 ===
1985 Karnataka Legislative Assembly election : Guledgud
Party	Candidate	Votes	%	±%
INC	Shankrayya Gadigayya Nanjayynmath	27,875	43.94%	▲1.11
JP	Hangaragi Veereyya Sangayya	26,202	41.30%	New
BJP	Banni Mallikarjun Veerappa	6,343	10.00%	▼33.83
LKD	Ramesh Bharashram Hirachand	1,495	2.36%	New
Independent	Angadi Parashram Hirachand	587	0.93%	New
Margin of victory		1,673	2.64%	▲1.64
Turnout		65,124	70.97%	▲6.21
Total valid votes		63,436		
Rejected ballots		1,688	2.59%	▼0.89
Registered electors		91,765		▲8.52
INC gain from BJP		Swing	▲0.11	

=== Assembly Election 1983 ===
1983 Karnataka Legislative Assembly election : Guledgud
Party	Candidate	Votes	%	±%
BJP	Banni Mallikarjun Veerappa	23,166	43.83%	New
INC	Janali Basanagouda Veeranagouda	22,640	42.83%	▲34.99
Independent	Talageri Mallappa Basappa	3,091	5.85%	New
Independent	Aripachaseb Murtujasab	2,791	5.28%	New
Independent	Jamkhani Mymuddin Murtujasaheb	1,169	2.21%	New
Margin of victory		526	1.00%	▼13.02
Turnout		54,761	64.76%	▼1.78
Total valid votes		52,857		
Rejected ballots		1,904	3.48%	▼0.32
Registered electors		84,563		▲5.48
BJP gain from INC(I)		Swing	▼9.26	

=== Assembly Election 1978 ===
1978 Karnataka Legislative Assembly election : Guledgud
Party	Candidate	Votes	%	±%
INC(I)	Janali Basanagouda Veeranagouda	27,245	53.09%	New
JP	Hatagar Bajeevarao Yamanappa	20,050	39.07%	New
INC	Patil Hanamantagonda Bhimanagouda	4,021	7.84%	New
Margin of victory		7,195	14.02%	
Turnout		53,343	66.54%	
Total valid votes		51,316		
Rejected ballots		2,027	3.80%	
Registered electors		80,170		
INC(I) gain from INC		Swing		

=== Assembly By-election 1975 ===
1975 Karnataka Legislative Assembly by-election : Guledgud
Party	Candidate	Votes	%	±%
INC	B. M. Horakeri			
INC hold		Swing	▼68.96	

=== Assembly Election 1972 ===
1972 Mysore State Legislative Assembly election : Guledgud
Party	Candidate	Votes	%	±%
INC	G. P. Nanjayyanamath	24,362	68.96%	▲16.36
INC(O)	Hatagar Bajirao Yamanappa	6,314	17.87%	New
ABJS	Kasat Shrin Iwas Ramajiwan	3,319	9.40%	▼38.00
Independent	Jawali Homanna Shivappa	1,331	3.77%	New
Margin of victory		18,048	51.09%	▲45.89
Turnout		36,997	62.33%	▼0.97
Total valid votes		35,326		
Registered electors		59,353		▲9.66
INC hold		Swing	▲16.36	

=== Assembly Election 1967 ===
1967 Mysore State Legislative Assembly election : Guledgud
Party	Candidate	Votes	%	±%
INC	P. M. Rudrappa	16,778	52.60%	▼8.64
ABJS	Kasat Shrin Iwas Ramajiwan	15,119	47.40%	New
Margin of victory		1,659	5.20%	▼17.27
Turnout		34,259	63.30%	▲4.01
Total valid votes		31,897		
Registered electors		54,124		▲1.10
INC hold		Swing	▼8.64	

=== Assembly Election 1962 ===
1962 Mysore State Legislative Assembly election : Guledgud
Party	Candidate	Votes	%	±%
INC	Madivalappa Rudrappa Pattanshetti	18,160	61.24%	▲0.32
ABJS	Shrinivas Ramjivan Kasta	11,496	38.76%	New
Margin of victory		6,664	22.47%	▲0.64
Turnout		31,739	59.29%	▼5.22
Total valid votes		29,656		
Registered electors		53,535		▲7.81
INC hold		Swing	▲0.32	

=== Assembly Election 1957 ===
1957 Mysore State Legislative Assembly election : Guledgud
Party	Candidate	Votes	%	±%
INC	Madivalappa Rudrappa Pattanshetti	19,514	60.92%	▼10.13
Independent	Shebina Katti Lummanna Keshappa	12,520	39.08%	New
Margin of victory		6,994	21.83%	▼20.26
Turnout		32,034	64.51%	▼6.15
Total valid votes		32,034		
Registered electors		49,658		▲10.44
INC hold		Swing	▼10.13	

=== Assembly Election 1952 ===
1952 Bombay State Legislative Assembly election : Guledgud Kamatgi
Party	Candidate	Votes	%	±%
INC	Madivalappa Rudrappa Pattanshetti	22,571	71.05%	New
KMPP	Nanjjayyanamath Gadagaya Parayya	9,199	28.95%	New
Margin of victory		13,372	42.09%	
Turnout		31,770	70.66%	
Total valid votes		31,770		
Registered electors		44,964		
INC win (new seat)				

== See also ==
- List of constituencies of the Karnataka Legislative Assembly
