= Jamkhandi Assembly constituency =

Constituency of the Karnataka Legislative Assembly

Coordinates: 16.51°N 75.29°E

Jamkhandi
- Constituency No. 21 for the Karnataka Legislative Assembly

Constituency details
- Country: India
- Region: South India
- State: Karnataka
- District: Bagalkot
- Lok Sabha constituency: Bagalkot
- Established: 1951
- Total electors: 214,797
- Reservation: None

Member of Legislative Assembly
- 16th Karnataka Legislative Assembly
- Incumbent Jagadish Gudagunti
- Party: Bharatiya Janata Party
- Elected year: 2023
- Preceded by: Anand Nyamagouda

Jamkhandi Assembly constituency is one of 224 assembly constituencies in Karnataka in India. It is part of Bagalkot Lok Sabha constituency.

Jagadish Gudagunti is the current MLA from Jamkhandi.

== Members of the Legislative Assembly ==
Election	Member	Party
1952	Basappa Danappa Jatti	Indian National Congress
1957	Basappa Danappa Jatti	Indian National Congress
1962	Basappa Danappa Jatti	Indian National Congress
1967	Basappa Danappa Jatti	Indian National Congress
1972	Bangi Pavadeppa Mallappa	Indian National Congress
1972^	A. S. Malappa	Indian National Congress
1978	Pattar Venkappa Veerappa	Indian National Congress
1983	Bagalkot Gurupadappa Shivappa	Janata Party
1985	Bagalkot Gurupadappa Shivappa	Janata Party
1989	Kaluti Ramappa Maleppa	Indian National Congress
1994	Kaluti Ramappa Maleppa	Indian National Congress
1999	Kaluti Ramappa Maleppa	Indian National Congress
2004	Siddu Savadi	Bharatiya Janata Party
2008	Kulkarni Shrikant Subrao	Bharatiya Janata Party
2013	Siddu Nyamagouda	Indian National Congress
2018	Siddu Nyamagouda	Indian National Congress
2018^ (Note: Due to death of sitting MLA)	Anand Nyamagouda	Indian National Congress
2023	Jagadish Gudagunti	Bharatiya Janata Party

== Election results ==
=== Assembly Election 2023 ===
2023 Karnataka Legislative Assembly election : Jamkhandi
Party	Candidate	Votes	%	±%
BJP	Jagadish Gudagunti	81,937	48.86	▲12.05
INC	Anand Siddu Nyamagouda	77,221	46.05	▼16.02
Independent	Belagali Sushilkumar	5,975	3.56	New
NOTA	None of the above	984	0.59	▲0.13
Margin of victory		4,716	2.81	▼22.45
Turnout		168,002	78.21	▲1.10
Total valid votes		167,688		
Registered electors		214,797		▲5.44
BJP gain from INC		Swing	▼13.21	

=== Assembly By-election 2018 ===
2018 Karnataka Legislative Assembly by-election : Jamkhandi
Party	Candidate	Votes	%	±%
INC	Anand Nyamagouda	97,017	62.07	▲30.01
BJP	Kulkarni Shrikant Subrao	57,537	36.81	▲6.57
NOTA	None of the above	724	0.46	▲0.21
Margin of victory		39,480	25.26	▲23.44
Turnout		157,089	77.11	▲1.60
Total valid votes		156,292		
Registered electors		203,709		▼0.05
INC hold		Swing	▲30.01	

=== Assembly Election 2018 ===
2018 Karnataka Legislative Assembly election : Jamkhandi
Party	Candidate	Votes	%	±%
INC	Siddu Nyamagouda	49,245	32.06	▼5.24
BJP	Kulkarni Shrikant Subrao	46,450	30.24	▲14.31
Independent	Nirani Sangmesh Rudrappa	24,461	15.92	New
Independent	Dalawai Shrishail Murari	19,753	12.86	New
PPP	Parashuram Maharajanavar	5,167	3.36	New
JSP(K)	Komar Muttappa Hanamappa	1,524	0.99	New
Independent	Parathanahalli Toufiq	1,200	0.78	New
NOTA	None of the above	379	0.25	New
Margin of victory		2,795	1.82	▼14.23
Turnout		153,898	75.51	▲0.87
Total valid votes		153,608		
Registered electors		203,821		▲15.34
INC hold		Swing	▼5.24	

=== Assembly Election 2013 ===
2013 Karnataka Legislative Assembly election : Jamkhandi
Party	Candidate	Votes	%	±%
INC	Siddu Nyamagouda	49,145	37.30	▲0.47
Independent	Jagadish Gudagunti	27,993	21.25	New
BJP	Shrikant Kulkarni	20,982	15.93	▼38.93
KJP	Umesh Mahabalashetti	18,211	13.82	New
JD(S)	Basagond Shivagond Sindhur	10,326	7.84	▲5.76
Independent	Ravindra Dhanavant Halingali	1,415	1.07	New
BSP	Sangamesh. Kamble	1,076	0.82	▼1.60
Independent	Makabul Rajesab Sayyad	994	0.75	New
Independent	Basappa Siddappa Kokatanur	950	0.72	New
Margin of victory		21,152	16.05	▼1.97
Turnout		131,899	74.64	▲6.94
Total valid votes		131,750		
Registered electors		176,718		▲9.39
INC gain from BJP		Swing	▼17.56	

=== Assembly Election 2008 ===
2008 Karnataka Legislative Assembly election : Jamkhandi
Party	Candidate	Votes	%	±%
BJP	Kulkarni Shrikant Subrao	59,930	54.86	▲2.44
INC	Siddu Nyamagouda	40,240	36.83	▲8.26
BSP	Upaddya Parshwanath Tavanappa	2,642	2.42	▼0.47
JD(S)	Ramesh Kallappa Naik	2,274	2.08	▼9.66
Independent	Bodali Pandit Shivappa	1,988	1.82	New
Rashtriya Hindustan Sena Karnataka	Shiraguppi Sadashiv Gurappa	1,122	1.03	New
SP	Nanajagi Suresh Satyappa	1,049	0.96	New
Margin of victory		19,690	18.02	▼5.84
Turnout		109,365	67.70	▲1.12
Total valid votes		109,245		
Registered electors		161,554		▼22.99
BJP hold		Swing	▲2.44	

=== Assembly Election 2004 ===
2004 Karnataka Legislative Assembly election : Jamkhandi
Party	Candidate	Votes	%	±%
BJP	Siddu Savadi	73,223	52.42	New
INC	Kaluti Ramappa Maleppa	39,902	28.57	▼25.96
JD(S)	Dalawai Shrishail Murari	16,402	11.74	▲10.56
BSP	Ravi Babaleshwar	4,036	2.89	New
JP	Madannavar Shrishail Nagappa	2,557	1.83	New
Independent	Bhadranavar Shankareppa Kadappa	1,733	1.24	New
Kannada Nadu Party	Hugar Shankar Manohar	1,134	0.81	New
Margin of victory		33,321	23.86	▲11.43
Turnout		139,690	66.58	▼5.42
Total valid votes		139,679		
Registered electors		209,794		▲20.77
BJP gain from INC		Swing	▼2.11	

=== Assembly Election 1999 ===
1999 Karnataka Legislative Assembly election : Jamkhandi
Party	Candidate	Votes	%	±%
INC	Kaluti Ramappa Maleppa	66,018	54.53	▲13.49
JD(U)	Shah Arunkumar Manikchand	50,964	42.09	New
JD(S)	Sayyad Altaf Tajuddin Airani	1,423	1.18	New
Independent	Chalawadi Chandrakant Basappa	988	0.82	New
Margin of victory		15,054	12.43	▲10.99
Turnout		125,077	72.00	▲4.00
Total valid votes		121,074		
Rejected ballots		3,793	3.03	▼0.02
Registered electors		173,709		▲10.55
INC hold		Swing	▲13.49	

=== Assembly Election 1994 ===
1994 Karnataka Legislative Assembly election : Jamkhandi
Party	Candidate	Votes	%	±%
INC	Kaluti Ramappa Maleppa	42,505	41.04	▼14.50
JD	Bagalkot Gurupadappa Shivappa	41,011	39.59	▼0.79
BJP	Savadi Siddu Kallappa	11,408	11.01	▲10.32
INC	Mallappa Parappa Nyamagoudar	3,173	3.06	New
KRRS	Mali Shivappa Ningappa	2,268	2.19	New
CPI	Ravindra Dhanavant Halingali	1,857	1.79	New
Margin of victory		1,494	1.44	▼13.72
Turnout		106,843	68.00	▼3.11
Total valid votes		103,577		
Rejected ballots		3,261	3.05	▼1.24
Registered electors		157,131		▲6.20
INC hold		Swing	▼14.50	

=== Assembly Election 1989 ===
1989 Karnataka Legislative Assembly election : Jamkhandi
Party	Candidate	Votes	%	±%
INC	Kaluti Ramappa Maleppa	55,927	55.54	▲10.57
JD	Bagalkot Gurupadappa Shivappa	40,662	40.38	New
JP	Devaravar Ningappa Sagreppa	2,547	2.53	New
BJP	Renake Suresh Subhan	691	0.69	▼0.24
Margin of victory		15,265	15.16	▲6.47
Turnout		105,211	71.11	▼0.77
Total valid votes		100,701		
Rejected ballots		4,510	4.29	▲2.57
Registered electors		147,964		▲27.06
INC gain from JP		Swing	▲1.87	

=== Assembly Election 1985 ===
1985 Karnataka Legislative Assembly election : Jamkhandi
Party	Candidate	Votes	%	±%
JP	Bagalkot Gurupadappa Shivappa	44,150	53.67	▼3.41
INC	Nyamagouda Guralingappa Sangappa	36,998	44.97	▲20.76
BJP	Bagalkot Shakuntala Chandrashekhar	766	0.93	New
Margin of victory		7,152	8.69	▼24.18
Turnout		83,704	71.88	▼0.58
Total valid votes		82,267		
Rejected ballots		1,437	1.72	▼0.50
Registered electors		116,452		▲13.64
JP hold		Swing	▼3.41	

=== Assembly Election 1983 ===
1983 Karnataka Legislative Assembly election : Jamkhandi
Party	Candidate	Votes	%	±%
JP	Bagalkot Gurupadappa Shivappa	41,445	57.08	▲14.60
INC	Basappa Danappa Jatti	17,580	24.21	▲19.86
Independent	Airani Syed Altaf Tajuddin	11,168	15.38	New
Independent	Kittur Bhimappa Shivalingappa	1,104	1.52	New
Independent	Hugar Kallappa Murteppa	524	0.72	New
Independent	Konnur Gurbasappa Kadappa	459	0.63	New
Margin of victory		23,865	32.87	▲26.90
Turnout		74,258	72.46	▼1.49
Total valid votes		72,613		
Rejected ballots		1,645	2.22	▼0.32
Registered electors		102,478		▲10.25
JP gain from INC(I)		Swing	▲8.62	

=== Assembly Election 1978 ===
1978 Karnataka Legislative Assembly election : Jamkhandi
Party	Candidate	Votes	%	±%
INC(I)	Pattar Venkappa Veerappa	32,461	48.46	New
JP	Bagalkot Gurupadappa Shivappa	28,460	42.48	New
INC	Hugar Kallappa Murteppa	2,914	4.35	▼42.18
Independent	Awati Shamshoddin Sydusaheb	2,510	3.75	New
Independent	Gondi Mahalingappa	647	0.97	New
Margin of victory		4,001	5.97	▲2.63
Turnout		68,736	73.95	
Total valid votes		66,992		
Rejected ballots		1,744	2.54	
Registered electors		92,953		
INC(I) gain from INC(O)		Swing	▼1.41	

=== Assembly By-election 1972 ===
1972 Mysore State Legislative Assembly by-election : Jamkhandi
Party	Candidate	Votes	%	±%
INC(O)	Athani S. Malappa	22,393	49.87	▲8.19
INC	B. P. Mallappa	20,895	46.53	▼9.36
SSP	T. B. Venkareddi	1,617	3.60	New
Margin of victory		1,498	3.34	▼10.87
Total valid votes		44,905		
INC(O) gain from INC		Swing	▼6.02	

=== Assembly Election 1972 ===
1972 Mysore State Legislative Assembly election : Jamkhandi
Party	Candidate	Votes	%	±%
INC	Bangi Pavadeppa Mallappa	26,029	55.89	▲2.27
INC(O)	A. G. Desai	19,411	41.68	New
ABJS	Y. C. Shindlingappa	1,128	2.42	New
Margin of victory		6,618	14.21	▲6.97
Turnout		47,657	66.45	▼10.21
Total valid votes		46,568		
Registered electors		71,718		▲15.97
INC hold		Swing	▲2.27	

=== Assembly Election 1967 ===
1967 Mysore State Legislative Assembly election : Jamkhandi
Party	Candidate	Votes	%	±%
INC	Basappa Danappa Jatti	24,578	53.62	▼10.09
Independent	M. M. Shivappa	21,261	46.38	New
Margin of victory		3,317	7.24	▼23.34
Turnout		47,411	76.66	▲8.11
Total valid votes		45,839		
Registered electors		61,843		▲13.29
INC hold		Swing	▼10.09	

=== Assembly Election 1962 ===
1962 Mysore State Legislative Assembly election : Jamkhandi
Party	Candidate	Votes	%	±%
INC	Basappa Danappa Jatti	22,776	63.71	▲8.55
Lok Sewak Sangh	Murgod Mahadevappa Shivappa	11,844	33.13	New
ABJS	Gurusangappa Chandramappa Malagar	1,127	3.15	New
Margin of victory		10,932	30.58	▲20.27
Turnout		37,421	68.55	▲5.27
Total valid votes		35,747		
Registered electors		54,586		▲23.06
INC hold		Swing	▲8.55	

=== Assembly Election 1957 ===
1957 Mysore State Legislative Assembly election : Jamkhandi
Party	Candidate	Votes	%	±%
INC	Basappa Danappa Jatti	15,481	55.16	▼7.72
Independent	Murgod Mahadevappa Shivappa	12,587	44.84	New
Margin of victory		2,894	10.31	▼35.24
Turnout		28,068	63.28	▲2.66
Total valid votes		28,068		
Registered electors		44,357		▼29.61
INC hold		Swing	▼7.72	

=== Assembly Election 1952 ===
1952 Bombay State Legislative Assembly election : Jamkhandi
Party	Candidate	Votes	%	±%
INC	Basappa Danappa Jatti	24,020	62.88	New
Independent	Murgod Mahadevappa Shivappa	6,618	17.32	New
KMPP	Bangi Pawadayappa Mallappa	5,500	14.40	New
Socialist Party (India)	Bokhare Anna Babaji	2,064	5.40	New
Margin of victory		17,402	45.55	
Turnout		38,202	60.62	
Total valid votes		38,202		
Registered electors		63,020		
INC win (new seat)				

== See also ==
- List of constituencies of the Karnataka Legislative Assembly
