= Siddu Nyamagouda =

Indian politician (1950–2018)

Siddappa Bhimappa Nyamagoudar

Minister of Ministry of State for Coal of India
- In office 25 June 1991 – 16 May 1996
- Prime Minister: P. V. Narasimha Rao
- Minister: P. A. Sangma, Ajit Kumar Panja, Jagdish Tytler
- Constituency: Bagalkot

Member of Parliament, Lok Sabha
- In office 1991-1996
- Preceded by: Subhash Tammannappa Patil
- Succeeded by: Hullappa Yamanappa Meti
- Constituency: Bagalkot

Member of Karnataka Legislative Council
- In office 2004 - 2010
- Constituency: Elected by Local Authorities

Member of the Karnataka Legislative Assembly for Jamkhandi
- In office 2013–2018
- Preceded by: Kulkarni Shrikanth Subbrao
- Succeeded by: Anand Nyamagouda

Personal details
- Born: 5 August 1949 Jamakhandi, Bijapur district, Bombay State (Now Bagalkot district, Karnataka)
- Died: 28 May 2018 (aged 67) Tulasigere, Bagalkot district, Karnataka
- Party: Indian National Congress
- Spouse: Sumitra
- Children: Two sons and three daughters (including Anand Nyamagouda)

Siddu Nyamagouda (1950–2018), also known as Barrage Siddu, was an Indian politician who served as the Minister of State for Coal in the Government of India. He also held the position of MLC and was elected twice as Member of the Legislative Assembly to the Karnataka Legislative Assembly in 2013 and 2018 from the Jamakhandi constituency in Bagalkote district.

== Early life ==
He was born on 5 August 1950 in Jamakhandi of Bagalkot district, Karnataka. He completed his schooling from P. B. High School in Jamakhandi and later completed his Bachelor of Science from Karnatak University in Dharwad.

== Political career ==
He contested Lok Sabha election in 1991 from Bagalkot against the former Chief Minister Ramakrishna Hegde whom he defeated by a considerable margin and ultimately became Minister of State for Coal in the P. V. Narasimha Rao's cabinet. After that, he became MLC and was elected MLA of Jamkhandi in 2013 Assembly elections and got re-elected in the recent state assembly election.

Social and economic upliftment of farmers; mobilised farmers to construct rupee one crore barrage across river Krishna without Govt. aid which provided irrigation lo 30,000 acres of land and drinking water to 2.5 lakh people and employment opportunities to 1.5 lakh people; this project is the first private dam in the country constructed by the people themselves.

== Notable work ==
He is known for building India's first private dam in 1989. The dam is named as Shrama Bindu Sagar and is built across Krishna River at Chikkapadasalgi village in Jamakhandi. The construction of dam took off in 1983 and the project drew the attention of international media. When the former chief minister of Karnataka Ramakrishna Hegde led government refused to fund the project owing to political reasons even though farmers would pay for a quarter of the expenses, he mobilized the farmers to build the barrage on their own. The Dam provided irrigation lo 30,000 acres of land and drinking water to 2.5 lakh people and employment opportunities to 1.5 lakh people. Farmers pooled their money and worked for six months to build the barrage. This accomplishment catapulted Siddu to national politics. He contested Lok Sabha election in 1991 against Ramakrishna Hegde and defeated him by considerable margin which paved the way for him to become minister in the P. V. Narasimha Rao's cabinet.

== Death ==
He died on 28 May 2018 near Tulasigeri on the way back to his constituency from New Delhi when his car's tire exploded, causing him to lose control and hit a barrier. He had a wife, two sons and three daughters.
