= J. T. Patil =

Indian politician

Member of the Karnataka Legislative Assembly
- Incumbent
- Assumed office 2023
- Preceded by: Murugesh Nirani
- Constituency: Bilgi
- In office 2013–2018
- Preceded by: Murugesh Nirani
- Succeeded by: Murugesh Nirani
- Constituency: Bilgi
- In office 1994–2004
- Preceded by: Yalligutti Gangadharappa Gurusiddappa
- Succeeded by: Murugesh Nirani
- Constituency: Bilgi

Personal details
- Born: Amalzari
- Party: Indian National Congress
- Education: Bachelor of Science
- Occupation: Politician
- Profession: Agriculturist

Jagadish Timmanagouda Patil is an Indian Politician from the state of Karnataka. He is currently serving as member of the Karnataka Legislative Assembly representing Bilgi.

He was appointed chairman for Hutti Gold Mines Corporation on 26 January 2024.

== Political career ==
He is from the Indian National Congress. He was first elected to the Karnataka Legislative Assembly in 1994 till 2004. He was re-elected from Bilgi in 2013 and again in 2023.
