= H. Y. Meti =

Indian politician (1946–2025)

Hullappa Yamanappa Meti

Member of the Karnataka Legislative Assembly for Bagalkot
- In office 2023–2025
- Preceded by: Veeranna Charantimath
- Succeeded by: Umesh Meti
- In office 2013–2018
- Preceded by: Veeranna Charantimath
- Succeeded by: Veeranna Charantimath
- In office 2004–2008
- In office 1989–1999
- Constituency: Guledgud

Minister for Excise, Government of Karnataka
- In office 21 June 2016 – 14 December 2016
- Preceded by: Manohar Tahasildar
- Succeeded by: R. B. Timmapur

Member of the 11th Lok Sabha
- In office 1996–1998
- Preceded by: Siddu Nyamagouda
- Succeeded by: Ajaykumar Sarnaik
- Constituency: Bagalkot

Personal details
- Born: 9 October 1946 Thimmapur, Bombay Province, British India
- Died: 4 November 2025 (aged 79) Bengaluru, Karnataka, India
- Party: Indian National Congress
- Other political affiliations: Janata Dal (until c. 2013)
- Spouse: Laxmibai H. Meti (m. 1964)

Hullappa Yamanappa Meti (9 October 1946 – 4 November 2025) was an Indian politician. He was a member of Indian National Congress, a member of the 14th Karnataka Legislative Assembly, and a former minister in the Siddaramaiah cabinet. In the 2013 Karnataka Legislative Assembly election, Meti was elected from the Bagalkot assembly constituency, polling 68,216 votes. In the 2018 Karnataka Legislative Assembly election, he lost to Veerabhadrayya Charantimath of BJP, by a margin of 15,934 votes. Prior to that, he was a MLA for Guledgud Assembly constituency from 1989 to 1999 and 2004 to 2008.

Meti was appointed chairman of Bagalkot Urban Development Authority in 2024.

== Scandal ==
Meti was appointed Excise Minister but he resigned, after a scandal broke out, on 7 December 2016. On 11 December, a woman alleged that he sought sexual favours in return for a transfer, but said she was not the woman in the sex video. Meti described it as a political conspiracy to malign him, claiming he was not involved in any immoral act with any woman, and challenged Mulali to release the tape.

The original video was reported missing during the investigation. On 24 May 2017, the Criminal Investigation Department (CID) of the Karnataka Police, which investigated the case gave him "clean chit" and reported that the video was doctored.

On 18 August 2017, a woman claiming that she was the one in the sex video filed a complaint of kidnapping and rape against Meti.

== Personal life ==
Meti was married to Laxmibai since 1964. They had four children together: sons Mallikarjun and Umesh, and daughters Bayakka and Mahadevi. Bayakka is a former president of the zilla panchayat of Bagalkot district. Following Meti's death on 4 November 2025, at the age of 79, Umesh was elected as legislator from his assembly seat of Bagalkot.
