= Bilgi Assembly constituency =

Constituency of the Karnataka Legislative Assembly

Coordinates: 16.34°N 75.63°E

Bilgi
- Constituency No. 22 for the Karnataka Legislative Assembly

Constituency details
- Country: India
- Region: South India
- State: Karnataka
- District: Bagalkot
- Lok Sabha constituency: Bagalkot
- Established: 1957
- Total electors: 231,594
- Reservation: None

Member of Legislative Assembly
- 16th Karnataka Legislative Assembly
- Incumbent J. T. Patil
- Party: Indian National Congress
- Elected year: 2023
- Preceded by: Murugesh Nirani

Bilgi Assembly constituency is one of 224 assembly constituencies in Karnataka State, in India. It is part of Bagalkot Lok Sabha constituency.

== Members of the Legislative Assembly ==
Election	Member	Party
1957	Rachappa Mallappa Desai	Indian National Congress
1962	Rachappa Mallappa Desai	Indian National Congress
1967	Rachappa Mallappa Desai	Indian National Congress
1972	G. K. Maritammappa	Indian National Congress
1978	Patil Siddanagoud Somanagoud	Indian National Congress
1983	Patil Siddanagoud Somanagoud	Indian National Congress
1985	Tungal Baburaddi Venkappa	Janata Party
1989	Yalligutti Gangadharappa Gurusiddappa	Janata Dal
1994	J. T. Patil	Indian National Congress
1999	J. T. Patil	Indian National Congress
2004	Murugesh Nirani	Bharatiya Janata Party
2008	Murugesh Nirani	Bharatiya Janata Party
2013	J. T. Patil	Indian National Congress
2018	Murugesh Nirani	Bharatiya Janata Party
2023	J. T. Patil	Indian National Congress

== Election results ==
=== Assembly Election 2023 ===
2023 Karnataka Legislative Assembly election : Bilgi
Party	Candidate	Votes	%	±%
INC	J. T. Patil	95,652	51.75%	▲5.41
BJP	Murugesh Nirani	84,523	45.73%	▼3.39
NOTA	None of the above	1,329	0.72%	▲0.23
Margin of victory		11,129	6.02%	▲3.24
Turnout		185,189	79.96%	▲0.51
Total valid votes		184,837		
Registered electors		231,594		▲6.13
INC gain from BJP		Swing	▲2.63	

=== Assembly Election 2018 ===
2018 Karnataka Legislative Assembly election : Bilgi
Party	Candidate	Votes	%	±%
BJP	Murugesh Nirani	85,135	49.12%	▲11.97
INC	Jagadish Timmanagouda Patil	80,324	46.34%	▲1.66
JD(S)	Sangappa Tippanna Kandagal	1,773	1.02%	▼12.43
Bhaarateeya Janashakthi Congress	Ashvini Desai	1,258	0.73%	New
Independent	Meerasab Moulasab Shaikh	1,187	0.68%	New
Independent	Mansursab Babajan Mujwar	1,139	0.66%	New
NOTA	None of the above	848	0.49%	New
Margin of victory		4,811	2.78%	▼4.75
Turnout		173,366	79.45%	▲1.12
Total valid votes		173,318		
Registered electors		218,220		▲14.57
BJP gain from INC		Swing	▲4.44	

=== Assembly Election 2013 ===
2013 Karnataka Legislative Assembly election : Bilgi
Party	Candidate	Votes	%	±%
INC	J. T. Patil	66,655	44.68%	▲3.89
BJP	Murugesh Nirani	55,417	37.15%	▼6.17
JD(S)	Basavaprabhu. Appasaheb. Saranadagouda	20,067	13.45%	▲3.80
Independent	Ramesh. Yallappa. Bhajantri	1,631	1.09%	New
BSRCP	Devendrappa. Basappa. Pujar	1,215	0.81%	New
Margin of victory		11,238	7.53%	▲5.00
Turnout		149,199	78.33%	▲7.21
Total valid votes		149,179		
Registered electors		190,477		▲9.73
INC gain from BJP		Swing	▲1.36	

=== Assembly Election 2008 ===
2008 Karnataka Legislative Assembly election : Bilgi
Party	Candidate	Votes	%	±%
BJP	Murugesh Nirani	53,474	43.32%	▼9.23
INC	Ajaykumar Saranayak	50,350	40.79%	▲1.60
JD(S)	Basavprabhu Appasaheb Saranadgouda (honniyal Desai)	11,916	9.65%	▲5.70
Independent	Jamadar Asharafali Dastagirasab	2,942	2.38%	New
Rashtriya Hindustan Sena Karnataka	Basavaraj Bhimappa Sidlingappanavar	1,347	1.09%	New
BSP	Harijan Vasu Muttappa	1,212	0.98%	▼0.36
Independent	Girish Tammannarao Kulkarni	899	0.73%	New
Margin of victory		3,124	2.53%	▼10.83
Turnout		123,449	71.12%	▲4.93
Total valid votes		123,446		
Registered electors		173,584		▼11.43
BJP hold		Swing	▼9.23	

=== Assembly Election 2004 ===
2004 Karnataka Legislative Assembly election : Bilgi
Party	Candidate	Votes	%	±%
BJP	Murugesh Nirani	68,136	52.55%	▲16.73
INC	J. T. Patil	50,811	39.19%	▼8.42
JD(S)	Ashok Virupakshappa Ganigar	5,122	3.95%	▼9.97
BSP	Koosappa Yallappa Chalawadi	1,736	1.34%	New
JP	Sangamesh Shiddappa Dashyal	1,733	1.34%	New
Urs Samyuktha Paksha	Shivalingappa Venki	1,188	0.92%	New
Kannada Nadu Party	Venkappa Phoolsingh Lamani	937	0.72%	New
Margin of victory		17,325	13.36%	▲1.57
Turnout		129,724	66.19%	▼4.13
Total valid votes		129,663		
Registered electors		195,976		▲21.63
BJP gain from INC		Swing	▲4.94	

=== Assembly Election 1999 ===
1999 Karnataka Legislative Assembly election : Bilgi
Party	Candidate	Votes	%	±%
INC	J. T. Patil	51,313	47.61%	▲11.61
BJP	Shrikant Kulkarni	38,604	35.82%	▲13.73
JD(S)	Dalawai Shrishail Murari	14,997	13.92%	New
Independent	Bhavi Mallappa Appanna	2,855	2.65%	New
Margin of victory		12,709	11.79%	▼0.65
Turnout		113,297	70.32%	▲1.98
Total valid votes		107,769		
Rejected ballots		5,488	4.84%	▲2.41
Registered electors		161,119		▲15.73
INC hold		Swing	▲11.61	

=== Assembly Election 1994 ===
1994 Karnataka Legislative Assembly election : Bilgi
Party	Candidate	Votes	%	±%
INC	J. T. Patil	33,424	36.00%	▼2.06
JD	Gangadhar Gurusiddappa Yalligutti	21,877	23.56%	▼19.53
BJP	Shrikant Kulkarni	20,510	22.09%	▲9.92
Independent	Dalawai Shrishail Murari	12,713	13.69%	New
KRRS	Jeeragal Shankrappa Venkappa	2,473	2.66%	New
INC	Katageri Mallapa Sagarappa	1,383	1.49%	New
Margin of victory		11,547	12.44%	▲7.41
Turnout		95,147	68.34%	▼3.56
Total valid votes		92,838		
Rejected ballots		2,309	2.43%	▼2.66
Registered electors		139,223		▲8.65
INC gain from JD		Swing	▼7.09	

=== Assembly Election 1989 ===
1989 Karnataka Legislative Assembly election : Bilgi
Party	Candidate	Votes	%	±%
JD	Yalligutti Gangadharappa Gurusiddappa	37,677	43.09%	New
INC	Desai Vasappa Adrushappa	33,279	38.06%	▼4.24
BJP	Kulkarni Shrikant Subbaji	10,637	12.17%	▲9.60
CPI	Halingali Ravindra Dhanavant	1,723	1.97%	New
JP	Ankalagi Krishna Fakeerappa	1,638	1.87%	New
RPI	Machchindra Appasaheb Bidari	1,119	1.28%	New
Kranti Sabha	Malaghan Hanamappa	889	1.02%	New
Margin of victory		4,398	5.03%	▼3.43
Turnout		92,125	71.90%	▲8.02
Total valid votes		87,435		
Rejected ballots		4,690	5.09%	▲2.95
Registered electors		128,138		▲26.84
JD gain from JP		Swing	▼7.67	

=== Assembly Election 1985 ===
1985 Karnataka Legislative Assembly election : Bilgi
Party	Candidate	Votes	%	±%
JP	Tungal Baburaddi Venkappa	32,056	50.76%	▲26.28
INC	Patil Siddanagoud Somanagoud	26,711	42.30%	▼8.26
BJP	Anantapur Chanabasappa Racahappa	1,622	2.57%	▼13.23
Independent	Masti Hanamappa Sadashivappa	1,336	2.12%	New
Independent	Desai Kulakumar Somanagoud	1,020	1.62%	New
Independent	Piroji Dongrisab Rajesab	406	0.64%	New
Margin of victory		5,345	8.46%	▼17.62
Turnout		64,533	63.88%	▲1.56
Total valid votes		63,151		
Rejected ballots		1,382	2.14%	▼1.37
Registered electors		101,023		▲12.05
JP gain from INC		Swing	▲0.20	

=== Assembly Election 1983 ===
1983 Karnataka Legislative Assembly election : Bilgi
Party	Candidate	Votes	%	±%
INC	Patil Siddanagoud Somanagoud	27,413	50.56%	▲43.26
JP	Belagali Pampakevi Rayappa	13,273	24.48%	▼17.80
BJP	Modi Shekarappa Gurappa	8,565	15.80%	New
Independent	Harijan Sadashiv Lenkappa	1,269	2.34%	New
Independent	Patil Ranganagouda Sihddanagouda	1,257	2.32%	New
Independent	Panashetti Shekar Sangappa	914	1.69%	New
Independent	Bandiwaddar Hanamant Durgappa	808	1.49%	New
Independent	Shirabur Mallappa Pandappa	651	1.20%	New
Margin of victory		14,140	26.08%	▲17.94
Turnout		56,192	62.32%	▼5.16
Total valid votes		54,220		
Rejected ballots		1,972	3.51%	▲0.63
Registered electors		90,161		▲6.39
INC gain from INC(I)		Swing	▲0.14	

=== Assembly Election 1978 ===
1978 Karnataka Legislative Assembly election : Bilgi
Party	Candidate	Votes	%	±%
INC(I)	Patil Siddanagoud Somanagoud	28,005	50.42%	New
JP	Patil Venkatanaik Appasaheb	23,485	42.28%	New
INC	Gangal Kalabasappa Marithamappa	4,057	7.30%	▼52.48
Margin of victory		4,520	8.14%	▼14.02
Turnout		57,192	67.48%	▲5.07
Total valid votes		55,547		
Rejected ballots		1,645	2.88%	▲2.88
Registered electors		84,749		▲20.91
INC(I) gain from INC		Swing	▼9.36	

=== Assembly Election 1972 ===
1972 Mysore State Legislative Assembly election : Bilgi
Party	Candidate	Votes	%	±%
INC	G. K. Maritammappa	25,216	59.78%	▼12.66
INC(O)	S. S. Shivasiddappa	15,867	37.62%	New
SSP	T. B. Venkareddy	558	1.32%	New
ABJS	A. S. Veerabhadrappa	540	1.28%	▼2.83
Margin of victory		9,349	22.16%	▼28.44
Turnout		43,749	62.41%	▲0.70
Total valid votes		42,181		
Registered electors		70,094		▲11.79
INC hold		Swing	▼12.66	

=== Assembly Election 1967 ===
1967 Mysore State Legislative Assembly election : Bilgi
Party	Candidate	Votes	%	±%
INC	Rachappa Mallappa Desai	26,016	72.44%	▼1.88
PSP	T. B. Venkappa	7,844	21.84%	New
ABJS	B. G. Ramappa	1,476	4.11%	New
Independent	G. I. Avvappa	577	1.61%	New
Margin of victory		18,172	50.60%	▼9.73
Turnout		38,691	61.71%	▲2.20
Total valid votes		35,913		
Registered electors		62,702		▲13.15
INC hold		Swing	▼1.88	

=== Assembly Election 1962 ===
1962 Mysore State Legislative Assembly election : Bilgi
Party	Candidate	Votes	%	±%
INC	Rachappa Mallappa Desai	23,158	74.32%	▼4.80
SWA	Gurupadayya Guruachayya Advimath	4,359	13.99%	New
ABJS	Kalyan Krishnaji Kerur	2,891	9.28%	New
Independent	Mallappa Chanabasappa Guggari	753	2.42%	New
Margin of victory		18,799	60.33%	▲2.09
Turnout		32,975	59.51%	▼5.21
Total valid votes		31,161		
Registered electors		55,413		▲14.72
INC hold		Swing	▼4.80	

=== Assembly Election 1957 ===
1957 Mysore State Legislative Assembly election : Bilgi
Party	Candidate	Votes	%	±%
INC	Rachappa Mallappa Desai	24,732	79.12%	New
Independent	Bangi Pavadeppa Mallappa	6,527	20.88%	New
Margin of victory		18,205	58.24%	
Turnout		31,259	64.72%	
Total valid votes		31,259		
Registered electors		48,301		
INC win (new seat)				

== See also ==
- List of constituencies of the Karnataka Legislative Assembly
