= P. C. Gaddigoudar =

Indian politician (born 1951)

Parvatagouda Chandanagouda Gaddigoudar

Member of Parliament, Lok Sabha
- Incumbent
- Assumed office 2004
- Preceded by: R.S. Patil
- Constituency: Bagalkot

Member of Karnataka Legislative Council
- In office 8 July 1988 – 7 July 1994
- Constituency: Bijapur Local Authorities

Personal details
- Born: 1 June 1951 (age 75) Hebballi, Mysuru State (present–day Karnataka), India
- Party: Bharatiya Janata Party
- Spouse: Savitramma
- Children: 3 sons and 1 daughter

Parvatagouda Gaddigoudar (1 June 1951) is a member of the 16th Lok Sabha of India. He also represented the 14th Lok Sabha. He represents the Bagalkot constituency of Karnataka since 2004 and is a member of the Bharatiya Janata Party (BJP) political party.

== Early life ==
Parvatagouda Gaddigoudar was born on 1 June 1951 at a small hamlet Heballi in Bagalkot District to Balavva and Chandanagouda Gaddigoudar. He graduated in the faculty of Arts from Basveshwar Arts College at Bagalkot affiliated to the Karnatak University. Later, he completed his bachelor's degree in law from the prestigious Raja Lakhamagouda College of Belgaum.

He married Savitra Devi on 6 February 1976 and continued to practice law at Badami.

== Public life ==
He started his public life in the early 1980s and his major boost came when he was appointed by the then chief minister of Karnataka, Ramakrishna Hegde in 1987 as chairman of the committee to study the reorganisation of districts. The report was implemented by J.H. Patel in 1997–98. He is considered instrumental in the creation of Bagalkot district, which was created after separating it from Bijapur. Parvatagouda Gaddigoudar was nominated to The Legislative Council of Karnataka in 1988. However, in 1994, he was unable to secure ticket from Janata Dal and contested the elections to the Assembly as an independent candidate.

Just before the elections for the 14th Lok Sabha, Gaddigoudar had denied allegations that he would be leaving All India Progressive Janata Dal (a splinter group of Janata Dal with allegiance to Ramakrishna Hegde) to join the Bharatiya Janata Party. However just before the elections, he did join the Bharatiya Janata Party with his followers and got the party's nomination from Bagalkot Lok Sabha Constituency. He entered the 14th Lok Sabha by securing 459,451 votes while his nearest rival, R.S. Patil of Indian National Congress, secured 292,068.

== Positions held ==
- Member of the Legislative Council of Karnataka 1988
- Member of the 14th Lok Sabha
- Member of the 15th Lok Sabha
- Member of the Parliamentary Committee on External Affairs
- Member of the 16th Lok Sabha
- Member of the 17th Lok Sabha
