= Terdal Assembly constituency =

Legislative Assembly constituency in Karnataka, India

Coordinates: 16.50°N 75.05°E

Terdal
- Constituency No. 20 for the Karnataka Legislative Assembly

Constituency details
- Country: India
- Region: South India
- State: Karnataka
- District: Bagalkot
- Lok Sabha constituency: Bagalkot
- Established: 2008
- Total electors: 227,749
- Reservation: None

Member of Legislative Assembly
- 16th Karnataka Legislative Assembly
- Incumbent Siddu Savadi
- Party: Bharatiya Janata Party
- Elected year: 2023

Terdal Assembly constituency is one of the 224 assembly constituencies in Karnataka in India. It is part of Bagalkot Lok Sabha constituency.

== Members of the Legislative Assembly ==
Election	Member	Party
2008	Siddu Savadi	Bharatiya Janata Party
2013	Umashree	Indian National Congress
2018	Siddu Savadi	Bharatiya Janata Party
2023	Siddu Savadi	Bharatiya Janata Party

== Election results ==
=== Assembly Election 2023 ===
2023 Karnataka Legislative Assembly election : Terdal
Party	Candidate	Votes	%	±%
BJP	Siddu Savadi	77,265	43.01%	▼7.44
INC	Siddu. Ramappa. Konnur	66,520	37.03%	▼1.26
Independent	Dr. Padmajeet A. Nadagouda Patil	22,480	12.51%	New
Independent	Ambadas Kamurthi	4,224	2.35%	New
SDPI	Yamanappa Vitthal Gunadal	3,527	1.96%	New
AAP	Arjun Halagigoudar	1,742	0.97%	New
NOTA	None of the above	894	0.50%	▼0.66
Margin of victory		10,745	5.98%	▼6.18
Turnout		179,822	78.96%	▲0.19
Total valid votes		179,661		
Registered electors		227,749		▲3.32
BJP hold		Swing	▼7.44	

=== Assembly Election 2018 ===
2018 Karnataka Legislative Assembly election : Terdal
Party	Candidate	Votes	%	±%
BJP	Siddu Savadi	87,583	50.45%	▲5.85
INC	Umashree	66,470	38.29%	▼8.02
JD(S)	Basappa K. Konnur	12,462	7.18%	▲3.69
NOTA	None of the above	2,014	1.16%	New
KRRS	Gangappa Shrishailappa Meti	1,272	0.73%	New
Namma Congress	R. Veeresh Prasad (Veeresh Nekar)	1,098	0.63%	New
Margin of victory		21,113	12.16%	▲10.45
Turnout		173,628	78.77%	▲0.12
Total valid votes		173,610		
Registered electors		220,421		▲14.33
BJP gain from INC		Swing	▲4.14	

=== Assembly Election 2013 ===
2013 Karnataka Legislative Assembly election : Terdal
Party	Candidate	Votes	%	±%
INC	Umashree	70,189	46.31%	▲5.85
BJP	Siddu Savadi	67,590	44.60%	▼5.70
KJP	Basavaraj Irappa Balikai	5,558	3.67%	New
JD(S)	Ranganagouda Shivanagouda Patil	5,282	3.49%	▲1.04
Independent	Maibubsab Mahmadsab Sangtras	1,407	0.93%	New
BSRCP	Kesaragoppa Ramesh Lakkappa	1,005	0.66%	New
Margin of victory		2,599	1.71%	▼8.13
Turnout		151,625	78.65%	▲8.80
Total valid votes		151,562		
Registered electors		192,795		▲8.13
INC gain from BJP		Swing	▼3.99	

=== Assembly Election 2008 ===
2008 Karnataka Legislative Assembly election : Terdal
Party	Candidate	Votes	%	±%
BJP	Siddu Savadi	62,595	50.30%	New
INC	Umashree	50,351	40.46%	New
Independent	Gangappa Shrishailappa Meti	3,142	2.52%	New
JD(S)	Kallappa. Sangappa. Girisa Gar	3,050	2.45%	New
SP	Kadaballavar. Kallappa. B. Himappa	1,684	1.35%	New
Rashtriya Hindustan Sena Karnataka	Bagi. Mahadevi. Yallappa	1,547	1.24%	New
BSP	Pramod. Balachandra. Javalagi	1,351	1.09%	New
Margin of victory		12,244	9.84%	
Turnout		124,532	69.85%	
Total valid votes		124,451		
Registered electors		178,292		
BJP win (new seat)				

== See also ==
- List of constituencies of the Karnataka Legislative Assembly
