= Murugesh Nirani =

Indian politician (born 1965)

Dr. Murugesh Nirani

Minister of Large & Medium Industries Government of Karnataka
- In office 4 August 2021 – 13 May 2023
- Chief Minister: Basavaraj Bommai
- Preceded by: Jagadish Shettar
- In office 7 June 2008 – 13 May 2013
- Chief Minister: B. S. Yediyurappa; Sadananda Gowda; Jagadish Shettar
- Preceded by: Katta Subramanya Naidu
- Succeeded by: R. V. Deshpande

Minister of Mines & Geology Government of Karnataka
- In office 21 January 2021 – 28 July 2021
- Chief Minister: B. S. Yediyurappa
- Preceded by: C. C. Patil
- Succeeded by: Halappa Achar

Member of Karnataka Legislative Assembly
- In office 2018 – 13 May 2023
- Preceded by: J. T. Patil
- Succeeded by: J. T. Patil
- Constituency: Bilgi
- In office 2004–2013
- Preceded by: J. T. Patil
- Succeeded by: J. T. Patil
- Constituency: Bilgi

Personal details
- Born: 18 August 1965 (age 60) Bilagi, Mysore State, India (present Karnataka)
- Party: Bharatiya Janata Party
- Spouse: Kamala Nirani
- Relations: Hanumant Nirani (brother)
- Education: B.E, Business Studies
- Alma mater: Bombay University
- Website: murugeshnirani.com, archived from the original on 27 March 2022

Murugesh Rudrappa Nirani (born 18 August 1965), is an Indian industrialist and politician who served as the Minister of Large and Medium Industries of Karnataka from 2021 to 2023. He was the Member of the Legislative Assembly (MLA) of Bilgi Assembly constituency in Bagalkot twice until his defeat in the 2023 Karnataka Legislative Assembly election. He is the brother of Hanumant Nirani who is a member of the Karnataka Legislative Council.

== Early life and education ==
Nirani was born in a Lingayat family, to Rudrappa and Sushilamma, at Basav Hanchal in Bilagi taluk of Bagalkot district.

He completed his B.E. in civil engineering and gained a diploma in Business Management from Bombay University. He became one of the foremost engineers from his village.

== Entrepreneurial career ==
Nirani set up his first sugar factory in Bagalkot, with a capacity of crushing 500 tonnes of sugarcane per day.

He received the Make in India award on 24 December 2014. He is also the chairman of Nirani Group, which includes [Nirani Sugars Ltd.], [Sai Priya Sugars Ltd.], MRN Cane Power India Ltd., [Nirani Cements Pvt. Ltd.], and [Bilagi Sugar Mill Ltd.].

As of 2021, over 120,000 farmers benefit from the infrastructure created by the MRN group and over 72,000 people are employed by the MRN Group. MRN group is also one of the largest producers of ethanol in India.

== Political career ==
He joined the Rashtriya Swayamsevak Sangh during his adolescence and has been a very crucial part of his political ideology. He says that he derives inspiration from the ideologies of the Maharaja of Mysore, Krishna Raja Wadiyar IV.

Nirani worked as a grassroot worker of the BJP in North Karnataka. He contested his first election to Karnataka Legislative Assembly from Biligi in 2004 and won with a landslide victory.

On 30 May 2008, Nirani was elevated as the cabinet Minister of Large and Medium Scale Industries. He was again sworn in as the Minister of Mines and Geology in the Fourth Yediyurappa ministry.
