= Chikkapadasalgi =

Village in Karnataka, India

Chikkapadasalgi ಚಿಕ್ಕಪದಸಾಲಗಿ
- Village
- Country: India
- State: Karnataka
- District: Bagalkot
- Taluka: Jamkhandi

Government
  - Type: Panchayat
  - Body: Chikka-Padasalgi Gram Panchayat

Area
  - Total: 12.24 km^{2} (4.73 sq mi)

Population (2011)
  - Total: 4,150
- Time zone: UTC+5:30 (IST)
- PIN: 587301

Chikkapadasalgi is a village in Jamkhandi taluka, Bagalkot district, Karnataka, India. It is managed by the Chikka-Padasalgi Gram Panchayat, a rural local body within the Jamkhandi Panchayat Samiti, which is part of the Bagalkot Zila Parishad. It governs two villages and is further divided into 18 wards.

== Geography ==
The village covers an area of 1,224.02 hectares. It is located 18 kilometers from Jamkhandi, the sub-district headquarters, and 95 kilometers from Bagalkot, the district headquarters. Jamkhandi is the nearest town for the village and supports its main economic activities.

== Administration ==
Chikkapadasalgi is governed under the Indian Constitution and the Panchayati Raj Act. The village is led by a Sarpanch, an elected head of the village.

== Population ==
As of the 2011 Census, Chikkapadasalgi has a population of 4,150 people. This includes 2,096 males and 2,054 females. The village has 810 households.

== Chikkapadasalgi dam ==
The village is also known for the Shrama Bindu Sagar Dam, popularly known as the Chikkapadasalgi dam, which was constructed in 1989 across the Krishna River near Jamkhandi town. The dam was built entirely by local farmers under the leadership of Siddu Nyamagouda, a local leader who later became a Union Minister. The dam has a storage capacity of 4.3 TMC (thousand million cubic feet) of water and provides irrigation to about 70,000 acres of agricultural land in the region.
