= Vijayanand Kashappanavar =

Indian politician (born 1972)

Vijayanand S Kashappanavar
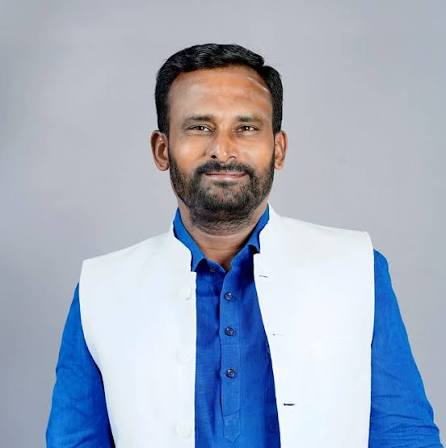

Member of the Karnataka Legislative Assembly
- Incumbent
- Assumed office 2023
- Preceded by: Doddanagouda G Patil
- Constituency: Hungund
- In office 2013–2018
- Preceded by: Doddanagouda G Patil
- Succeeded by: Doddanagouda G Patil
- Constituency: Hungund

Personal details
- Party: Indian National Congress
- Spouse: Veena Kashappanavar

Kashappanavar Vijayanand Shivashankarappa (born 1 July 1972) is an Indian politician from Karnataka. He is a member of the Karnataka Legislative Assembly from the Hungund in Bagalkot district, representing Indian National Congress. He won the 2023 Karnataka Legislative Assembly election.

He was appointed chairman for Karnataka Sports Authority on 26 January 2024.

== Early life and education ==
Shivashankarappa is from Hundgund, Bagalkote district. He was born to Shivashankarappa Rachappa Kashappanavar, a three time MLA from Hungund. He completed his pre university course in 1992 from S. J. Independent pre university college, Hitnalli thanda, Bijapur.

== Career ==
Shivashankarappa won from Hungund Assembly constituency representing Indian National Congress in the 2023 Karnataka Legislative Assembly election. He polled 78,434 votes and defeated his nearest rival, Doddanagouda G. Patil of Bharatiya Janata Party, by a margin of 30,007 votes. He won as an MLA for the first time winning the 2013 Karnataka Legislative Assembly election representing Indian National Congress from Hungund. In 2018, he lost to Doddannagouda Patil of BJP by a margin of 5,227 votes.
