= Andanappa Doddameti =

Indian politician

Minister of State for Minor Irrigation, Government of Mysore
- In office 1968 – March 1971

Member of the Mysore Legislative Assembly
- In office 1957–1972
- Succeeded by: A. V. Patil
- Constituency: Ron

Member of the Bombay Legislative Assembly
- In office 1952–1957
- Preceded by: Constituency established
- Constituency: Ron

Member of the Bombay Legislative Assembly for Dharwad North
- In office 1946–1946
- In office 1937–1939

Personal details
- Born: 16 March 1908; Jakkali, Gadag, Bombay Presidency, British India
- Died: 21 February 1972 (aged 63)
- Political party: Indian National Congress
- Spouse(s): Annapurna; Devikadevi

Andanappa Jnanappa Doddameti (16 March 1908 – 21 February 1972) was an Indian statesman. He is known for his role in the Unification of Karnataka and his significant participation in the Indian Independence Movement.

== Early life ==
Doddameti was born into a farming family of Jnanappa and Basamma in Jakkali village, Ron taluk, of the erstwhile Bombay Presidency of British India (in present-day Karnataka) on 16 March 1908. Doddameti was an agriculturist through ancestry. He joined the Indian National Congress in 1930. In 1933, he was named director of the Karnatak Provincial Congress Committee. He took part in the Non-Cooperation Movement of 1933. He was jailed for half a year and fined 2,000 Indian rupees him for his role in the Ankola stir. Doddameti discontinued his education after class three. He was married a few months before he turned 18, and had two wives — Annapurna and Devikadevi.

== Career ==
Doddameti founded the Dharwad District Harijan Sevak Sangh after his release from jail. He met Mahatma Gandhi in the Yarvada jail, and sought his blessing for the work for upliftment of Harijans. Additionally, Doddameti served as the president of the Jamkhandi State People's Conference from 1932 to 1948.

Doddameti was elected to the Bombay Legislative Assembly from the Dharwad North constituency in 1937. In 1938, he supported a motion for the creation of a Karnatak province, addressing the legislature in Kannada language. He was the first legislator to speak in Kannada in the assembly. He was jailed during a 1940 satyagraha. Previously, he was imprisoned during the Quit India movement of 1942, and spent thirty-three months in jail.

Doddameti was re-elected to the Bombay Legislative Assembly in 1946. On 1 April 1947, he moved a resolution in the Legislative Assembly calling for the creation of a Karnatak province, which was adopted by the legislature with 60 votes in favour and 8 against. He was re-elected to the Bombay Legislative Assembly in the 1952 elections, representing the Ron constituency. He served as the Working President of the Karnatak Unification League. Doddameti was a Member of the Bombay Legislative Assembly until 1956. From 1956 onwards, he served as member of the Mysore Legislative Assembly. He was re-elected to the Mysore Legislative Assembly in 1957, 1962 and 1967. In 1957 and 1966, he moved a resolutions in the Mysore Legislative Assembly, calling for the state to be renamed Karnataka.

In 1968, Doddameti was named as Minister of State for Minor Irrigation in the Mysore state government. His tenure as Minister ended in March 1971.

Doddameti died on 21 February 1972.
