= Hungund Assembly constituency =

Constituency of the Karnataka Legislative Assembly

Coordinates: 16.06°N 76.06°E

Hungund
- Constituency No. 24 for the Karnataka Legislative Assembly

Constituency details
- Country: India
- Region: South India
- State: Karnataka
- District: Bagalkot
- Lok Sabha constituency: Bagalkot
- Established: 1951
- Total electors: 222,676
- Reservation: None

Member of Legislative Assembly
- 16th Karnataka Legislative Assembly
- Incumbent Vijayanand Kashappanavar
- Party: Indian National Congress
- Elected year: 2023
- Preceded by: Doddanagouda G. Patil

Hungund Assembly constituency is one of 224 assembly constituencies in Karnataka, India. It is part of Bagalkot Lok Sabha constituency.

== Members of the Legislative Assembly ==
Election	Member	Party
1952	S. R. Kanthi	Indian National Congress
1957	S. R. Kanthi	Indian National Congress
1962	S. R. Kanthi	Indian National Congress
1967	S. R. Kanthi	Indian National Congress
1970 By-election	N. G. Parayya	NCJ
1972	Nagaral Sangappa Balappa	Indian National Congress
1978	Shankarappa Kavashetti Sugurappa	Independent politician
1983	Shivasangappa Kadapatti Shiddappa	Janata Party
1985	Shivasangappa Kadapatti Shiddappa	Janata Party
1989	Shivashankarappa Kashappanavar Rachappa	Indian National Congress
1994	Shivashankarappa Kashappanavar Rachappa	Indian National Congress
1999	Shivashankarappa Kashappanavar Rachappa	Indian National Congress
2003 By-election (Note: Death of Shivashankarappa Kashappanavar Rachappa)	K. Gouramma Shivashankarappa	Indian National Congress
2004	Doddanagouda G. Patil	Bharatiya Janata Party
2008	Doddanagouda G. Patil	Bharatiya Janata Party
2013	Vijayanand Kashappanavar	Indian National Congress
2018	Doddanagouda G. Patil	Bharatiya Janata Party
2023	Vijayanand Kashappanavar	Indian National Congress

== Election results ==
=== Assembly Election 2023 ===
2023 Karnataka Legislative Assembly election : Hungund
Party	Candidate	Votes	%	±%
INC	Vijayanand Kashappanavar	78,434	47.43%	▲9.24
BJP	Doddanagouda G. Patil	48,427	29.29%	▼12.24
KRPP	Navali Hiremath. S. R	33,790	20.43%	New
NOTA	None of the above	1,053	0.64%	▼0.44
Margin of victory		30,007	18.15%	▲14.81
Turnout		165,487	74.32%	▲1.21
Total valid votes		165,361		
Registered electors		222,676		▲3.98
INC gain from BJP		Swing	▲5.90	

=== Assembly Election 2018 ===
2018 Karnataka Legislative Assembly election : Hungund
Party	Candidate	Votes	%	±%
BJP	Doddanagouda G. Patil	65,012	41.53%	▼0.01
INC	Vijayanand Kashappanavar	59,785	38.19%	▼14.88
Independent	S. R. Navalihiremath	25,850	16.51%	New
Independent	M. Shashikumar Halepadi	2,359	1.51%	New
NOTA	None of the above	1,698	1.08%	New
Margin of victory		5,227	3.34%	▼8.19
Turnout		156,558	73.11%	▲1.71
Total valid votes		156,533		
Registered electors		214,145		▲11.55
BJP gain from INC		Swing	▼11.54	

=== Assembly Election 2013 ===
2013 Karnataka Legislative Assembly election : Hungund
Party	Candidate	Votes	%	±%
INC	Vijayanand Kashappanavar	72,720	53.07%	▲9.84
BJP	Doddanagouda G. Patil	56,923	41.54%	▼6.20
JD(S)	Abdul Zabbar S/o. Abdulhasan Kalaburgi	2,213	1.62%	▼2.36
Independent	H. L. Madar	1,292	0.94%	New
Independent	Netikatti Sharanbasappa Mahantappa	924	0.67%	New
BSP	Saim Khajesab Husenasab	847	0.62%	▼1.07
Margin of victory		15,797	11.53%	▲7.02
Turnout		137,063	71.40%	▲6.11
Total valid votes		137,024		
Registered electors		191,972		▲11.53
INC gain from BJP		Swing	▲5.33	

=== Assembly Election 2008 ===
2008 Karnataka Legislative Assembly election : Hungund
Party	Candidate	Votes	%	±%
BJP	Doddanagouda G. Patil	53,644	47.74%	▼9.17
INC	Vijayanand Kashappanavar	48,575	43.23%	▲7.03
JD(S)	B. V. Patil	4,467	3.98%	▲0.33
Independent	Sangappa Karedeppa Nashi	2,468	2.20%	New
BSP	T. Abdul Zabbar Ismailsaab	1,900	1.69%	New
JD(U)	Hongal Nagaraj Sheshappa	1,311	1.17%	New
Margin of victory		5,069	4.51%	▼16.20
Turnout		112,383	65.29%	▲3.03
Total valid votes		112,365		
Registered electors		172,121		▲20.22
BJP hold		Swing	▼9.17	

=== Assembly Election 2004 ===
2004 Karnataka Legislative Assembly election : Hungund
Party	Candidate	Votes	%	±%
BJP	Doddanagouda G. Patil	50,617	56.91%	▲33.30
INC	Kashappanavar Gouramma Shivashankarappa	32,193	36.20%	▲0.86
JD(S)	Gondi Shivappa Chandappa	3,247	3.65%	▼7.00
JP	Shastrihiremath Renukayya Somashekarayya	1,664	1.87%	New
Urs Samyuktha Paksha	Nalavadad Basavaraj Chinnappa	1,222	1.37%	New
Margin of victory		18,424	20.71%	▲8.98
Turnout		89,139	62.26%	▼1.58
Total valid votes		88,943		
Registered electors		143,177		▲4.16
BJP gain from INC		Swing	▲21.57	

=== Assembly By-election 2003 ===
2003 Karnataka Legislative Assembly by-election : Hungund
Party	Candidate	Votes	%	±%
INC	K. Gouramma Shivashankarappa	31,014	35.34%	▼2.48
BJP	P. M. Sangangouda	20,717	23.61%	New
PJD (India)	P. G. Paranagouda	15,675	17.86%	New
Independent	P. S. Hanumantagouda	11,010	12.55%	New
JD(S)	K. V. Shivasangappa	9,347	10.65%	▲8.11
Margin of victory		10,297	11.73%	▲10.52
Turnout		87,763	63.84%	▼3.29
Total valid votes		87,763		
Registered electors		137,464		▲12.01
INC hold		Swing	▼2.48	

=== Assembly Election 1999 ===
1999 Karnataka Legislative Assembly election : Hungund
Party	Candidate	Votes	%	±%
INC	Shivashankarappa Kashappanavar Rachappa	29,307	37.82%	▲2.26
JD(U)	Gavishidhanagouda Paranagouda Patil	28,371	36.61%	New
Independent	Basavaraj Shivasangappa Kadapatti	17,846	23.03%	New
JD(S)	Sanganna Channappa Kadapatti	1,969	2.54%	New
Margin of victory		936	1.21%	▼1.86
Turnout		82,387	67.13%	▲3.74
Total valid votes		77,493		
Rejected ballots		4,567	5.54%	▲2.51
Registered electors		122,725		▲6.07
INC hold		Swing	▲2.26	

=== Assembly Election 1994 ===
1994 Karnataka Legislative Assembly election : Hungund
Party	Candidate	Votes	%	±%
INC	Shivashankarappa Kashappanavar Rachappa	25,288	35.56%	▼28.07
JD	Gavishidhanagouda Paranagouda Patil	23,108	32.50%	▼2.34
Independent	Undodi Siddappa Guralingappa	14,527	20.43%	New
BJP	Patil Sanganagouda Ganganagouda	4,267	6.00%	New
Independent	Karadi Shantakumar Rajappa	1,102	1.55%	New
INC	Dr. Mashetti Nagappa Basappa	944	1.33%	New
KRRS	Mallinagouda. M. Tumbad	656	0.92%	New
BSP	S. M. Patil	432	0.61%	New
Margin of victory		2,180	3.07%	▼25.72
Turnout		73,346	63.39%	▼3.76
Total valid votes		71,105		
Rejected ballots		2,219	3.03%	▼1.08
Registered electors		115,698		▲7.57
INC hold		Swing	▼28.07	

=== Assembly Election 1989 ===
1989 Karnataka Legislative Assembly election : Hungund
Party	Candidate	Votes	%	±%
INC	Shivashankarappa Kashappanavar Rachappa	44,065	63.63%	▲18.18
JD	Shivasangappa Kadapatti Shiddappa	24,129	34.84%	New
JP	Yadahalli Rajashekhar Veerabhadrappa	545	0.79%	New
Margin of victory		19,936	28.79%	▲21.96
Turnout		72,225	67.15%	▼3.19
Total valid votes		69,253		
Rejected ballots		2,972	4.11%	▲1.31
Registered electors		107,558		▲24.97
INC gain from JP		Swing	▲11.35	

=== Assembly Election 1985 ===
1985 Karnataka Legislative Assembly election : Hungund
Party	Candidate	Votes	%	±%
JP	Shivasangappa Kadapatti Shiddappa	30,762	52.28%	▼4.34
INC	Shivashankarappa Kashappanavar Rachappa	26,745	45.45%	▲5.38
BJP	Gogi Gurunathappa Kuberappa	1,190	2.02%	New
Margin of victory		4,017	6.83%	▼9.72
Turnout		60,539	70.34%	▲6.38
Total valid votes		58,842		
Rejected ballots		1,697	2.80%	▼0.61
Registered electors		86,069		▲10.46
JP hold		Swing	▼4.34	

=== Assembly Election 1983 ===
1983 Karnataka Legislative Assembly election : Hungund
Party	Candidate	Votes	%	±%
JP	Shivasangappa Kadapatti Shiddappa	27,254	56.62%	▲39.04
INC	Patil Shivayya Mahabalayya	19,286	40.07%	▲36.99
Independent	Rachappa Kavishetti Shivalingappa	1,235	2.57%	New
Independent	Sangappa Karedeppa Nashi	361	0.75%	New
Margin of victory		7,968	16.55%	▲16.34
Turnout		49,836	63.96%	▼4.61
Total valid votes		48,136		
Rejected ballots		1,700	3.41%	▼0.56
Registered electors		77,918		▲5.86
JP gain from Independent		Swing	▲16.85	

=== Assembly Election 1978 ===
1978 Karnataka Legislative Assembly election : Hungund
Party	Candidate	Votes	%	±%
Independent	Shankarappa Kavashetti Sugurappa	19,276	39.77%	New
INC(I)	Patil Shivayya Mahabalayya	19,174	39.56%	New
JP	Melligeri Shivaputrappa Shivabasappa	8,522	17.58%	New
INC	Kathani Basappa Gaviyappa	1,491	3.08%	▼60.70
Margin of victory		102	0.21%	▼30.66
Turnout		50,469	68.57%	▲5.67
Total valid votes		48,463		
Rejected ballots		2,006	3.97%	▲3.97
Registered electors		73,604		▲13.72
Independent gain from INC		Swing	▼24.01	

=== Assembly Election 1972 ===
1972 Mysore State Legislative Assembly election : Hungund
Party	Candidate	Votes	%	±%
INC	Nagaral Sangappa Balappa	25,128	63.78%	New
INC(O)	N. T. Basaraddeppa	12,966	32.91%	New
ABJS	A. S. Shankarappa Shivappa	1,303	3.31%	New
Margin of victory		12,162	30.87%	▲16.45
Turnout		40,711	62.90%	
Total valid votes		39,397		
Registered electors		64,725		
INC gain from NCJ		Swing	▲6.57	

=== Assembly By-election 1970 ===
1970 Mysore State Legislative Assembly by-election : Hungund
Party	Candidate	Votes	%	±%
NCJ	N. G. Parayya	22,622	57.21%	New
NCN	Karadi S. Sugirappa	16,920	42.79%	New
Margin of victory		5,702	14.42%	▼25.98
Total valid votes		39,542		
NCJ gain from INC		Swing	▼12.04	

=== Assembly Election 1967 ===
1967 Mysore State Legislative Assembly election : Hungund
Party	Candidate	Votes	%	±%
INC	Karadi S. Rudrappa	23,364	69.25%	▲2.54
Independent	N. G. Parayya	9,732	28.84%	New
Independent	B. T. Govindappa	643	1.91%	New
Margin of victory		13,632	40.40%	▲1.79
Turnout		36,254	62.47%	▲0.35
Total valid votes		33,739		
Registered electors		58,036		▲12.18
INC hold		Swing	▲2.54	

=== Assembly Election 1962 ===
1962 Mysore State Legislative Assembly election : Hungund
Party	Candidate	Votes	%	±%
INC	S. R. Kanthi	20,010	66.71%	▲5.53
Independent	Gaigayya Padadappayya Nanjayanmath Alias Parayya	8,427	28.09%	New
Lok Sewak Sangh	Sardar Basavaraj Karbasappa Nagur	1,024	3.41%	New
ABJS	Tukaramappa Govindappa Bhandari	536	1.79%	New
Margin of victory		11,583	38.61%	▲16.24
Turnout		32,138	62.12%	▲3.27
Total valid votes		29,997		
Registered electors		51,733		▲6.65
INC hold		Swing	▲5.53	

=== Assembly Election 1957 ===
1957 Mysore State Legislative Assembly election : Hungund
Party	Candidate	Votes	%	±%
INC	S. R. Kanthi	17,467	61.18%	▼11.15
Independent	Nanjayyanamath Gadigeyyaparayya	11,081	38.82%	New
Margin of victory		6,386	22.37%	▼30.84
Turnout		28,548	58.85%	▼10.30
Total valid votes		28,548		
Registered electors		48,508		▲4.90
INC hold		Swing	▼11.15	

=== Assembly Election 1952 ===
1952 Bombay State Legislative Assembly election : Hungund
Party	Candidate	Votes	%	±%
INC	Kanthi Shivlingappaa Rudrappa	23,128	72.33%	New
KMPP	Desai Shankargauda Basalingappagauda	6,115	19.12%	New
Independent	Gaddi Basappa Sangappa	1,674	5.24%	New
Independent	Rajamani Danappa Karisiddappa	1,058	3.31%	New
Margin of victory		17,013	53.21%	
Turnout		31,975	69.15%	
Total valid votes		31,975		
Registered electors		46,240		
INC win (new seat)				

== See also ==
- List of constituencies of the Karnataka Legislative Assembly
