= Amalzari =

- Village
- Location in Karnataka, India
- Coordinates: 16°23′27.61″N 74°24′13.19″E
- Country: India
- State: Karnataka
- District: Belgaum

Languages
  - Official: Kannada
- Time zone: UTC+5:30 (IST)
- Postal code: 591238
- Lok Sabha constituency: Belgaum

Amalzari is a village in Belgaum district in the eastern state of Karnataka, India.
