= Bagalkot Assembly constituency =

Constituency of the Karnataka legislative assembly in India

Coordinates: 16.17°N 75.65°E

Bagalkot
- Constituency No. 24 for the Karnataka Legislative Assembly

Constituency details
- Country: India
- Region: South India
- State: Karnataka
- District: Bagalkot
- Lok Sabha constituency: Bagalkot
- Established: 1951
- Total electors: 245,532
- Reservation: None

Member of Legislative Assembly
- 16th Karnataka Legislative Assembly
- Incumbent U. H. Meti
- Party: INC
- Elected year: 2026

Bagalkot Assembly constituency is one of the 224 constituencies in the Karnataka Legislative Assembly, in India. It is also part of Bagalkot Lok Sabha constituency.

== Members of the Legislative Assembly ==
Election	Member	Party
1952	Muranal Basappa Tammanna	Indian National Congress
1957	Muranal Basappa Tammanna	Indian National Congress
1962	Muranal Basappa Tammanna	Indian National Congress
1962^ (Note: Resigned on 16/04/1962)	S. Nijalingappa	Indian National Congress
1967	Muranal Basappa Tammanna	Indian National Congress
1972	Muranal Basappa Tammanna	Indian National Congress
1978	Kalligudd Parappa Karabasappa	Indian National Congress
1983	Mantur Goolappa Venkappa	Independent politician
1985	Mantur Goolappa Venkappa	Janata Party
1989	Ajay Kumar Sambasadashiv Sarnaik	Janata Dal
1994	Ajay Kumar Sambasadashiv Sarnaik	Janata Dal
1998^ (Note: Resigned on 23/03/1998)	Pralhad Hanamantappa	Bharatiya Janata Party
1999	Pralhad Hanamantappa	Bharatiya Janata Party
2004	Veeranna Charantimath	Bharatiya Janata Party
2008	Veeranna Charantimath	Bharatiya Janata Party
2013	H. Y. Meti	Indian National Congress
2018	Veeranna Charantimath	Bharatiya Janata Party
2023	H. Y. Meti	Indian National Congress
2026^ (Note: Died on 04/11/2025)	U. H. Meti	Indian National Congress

== Election results ==
=== By-election 2026 ===
2026 Bagalkot by-election: Bagalkot
Party	Candidate	Votes	%	±%
INC	U. H. Meti	98,919	55.41	
BJP	Veerabhadrayya Charanthimath	76,587	42.90	
NOTA	None of the above	1,548	0.82	
Majority		22,332	12.51	
Turnout		178,531	68.70	
INC hold		Swing		

=== Assembly Election 2023 ===
2023 Karnataka Legislative Assembly election : Bagalkot
Party	Candidate	Votes	%	±%
INC	H. Y. Meti	79,336	46.57	▲3.40
BJP	Veerabhadrayya Charantimath	73,458	43.12	▼9.91
Independent	Mallikarjun Chandrashekharayya Charantimath	10,116	5.94	New
JD(S)	Devaraj H. Patil	3,470	2.04	New
NOTA	None of the above	1,236	0.73	▼0.45
Margin of victory		5,878	3.45	▼6.42
Turnout		170,548	69.46	▼0.55
Total valid votes		170,370		
Registered electors		245,532		▲6.33
INC gain from BJP		Swing	▼6.46	

=== Assembly Election 2018 ===
2018 Karnataka Legislative Assembly election : Bagalkot
Party	Candidate	Votes	%	±%
BJP	Veeranna Charantimath	85,653	53.03	▲6.36
INC	H. Y. Meti	69,719	43.17	▼5.57
BSP	Mohan Mallikarjuan Jigalur	996	0.62	▼0.13
NOTA	None of the above	1,902	1.18	New
Margin of victory		15,934	9.87	▲7.80
Turnout		161,671	70.01	▲0.46
Total valid votes		161,511		
Registered electors		230,918		▲14.66
BJP gain from INC		Swing	▲4.29	

=== Assembly Election 2013 ===
2013 Karnataka Legislative Assembly election : Bagalkot
Party	Candidate	Votes	%	±%
INC	H. Y. Meti	68,216	48.74	▲15.08
BJP	Veeranna Charantimath	65,316	46.67	▲4.65
Independent	Parashuram Manasing Rathod	1,941	1.39	New
JD(S)	Basavaraj Sanganagouda Patil (jakkanagoudra	1,882	1.34	▼14.39
WPOI	Parashuram Laxman Neelanayak	1,559	1.11	New
BSP	Babusha Dastgeersab Rolli (r. D. Babua)	1,052	0.75	▼0.76
Margin of victory		2,900	2.07	▼6.29
Turnout		140,071	69.55	▲7.13
Total valid votes		139,966		
Registered electors		201,390		▲13.65
INC gain from BJP		Swing	▲6.72	

=== Assembly Election 2008 ===
2008 Karnataka Legislative Assembly election : Bagalkot
Party	Candidate	Votes	%	±%
BJP	Veeranna Charantimath	46,452	42.02	▲8.69
INC	H. Y. Meti	37,206	33.66	▲5.84
JD(S)	Pujar Pralhad Hanamantappa	17,389	15.73	▲13.61
Independent	Tapashetti Prakash Ishwarappa	4,513	4.08	New
BSP	Abbaskhan Shanukhan Mujawar	1,669	1.51	▼0.20
SP	Khaji Kutubsab Bashasab	1,397	1.26	New
Independent	Godi Siddappa Satyappa	1,133	1.02	New
Independent	Girish Tammannarao Kulakarni	791	0.72	New
Margin of victory		9,246	8.36	▲3.04
Turnout		110,613	62.42	▼1.76
Total valid votes		110,550		
Registered electors		177,202		▲9.49
BJP hold		Swing	▲8.69	

=== Assembly Election 2004 ===
2004 Karnataka Legislative Assembly election : Bagalkot
Party	Candidate	Votes	%	±%
BJP	Veeranna Charantimath	34,597	33.33	▼14.51
Independent	Poojar Pralhad Hanumantappa	29,075	28.01	New
INC	Ajay Kumar Sambasadashiv Sarnaik	28,878	27.82	▼19.86
Independent	Laxman Channabasappa Muchakandi	4,033	3.89	New
JD(S)	Abdul Razak Imamsab Salikad	2,205	2.12	▲0.15
BSP	Guled Chandrakant Sidramappa	1,773	1.71	▼0.79
JP	Tondihal Sanganagouda Annadanagouda	945	0.91	New
Independent	Mahantesh Bhimappa Pujari	885	0.85	New
Independent	Girish Tammannarao Kulakarni	806	0.78	New
Margin of victory		5,522	5.32	▲5.16
Turnout		103,875	64.18	▼1.68
Total valid votes		103,809		
Registered electors		161,837		▲20.55
BJP hold		Swing	▼14.51	

=== Assembly Election 1999 ===
1999 Karnataka Legislative Assembly election : Bagalkot
Party	Candidate	Votes	%	±%
BJP	Pujar Pralhad Hanamantappa	40,418	47.84	▲23.39
INC	Dr Kanthi Rajshekhar Kidiyappa	40,280	47.68	▲26.75
BSP	Parashuram Jalagar	2,116	2.50	New
JD(S)	Shettar Sidramappa Mahantappa	1,667	1.97	New
Margin of victory		138	0.16	▼7.40
Turnout		88,421	65.86	▼0.90
Total valid votes		84,481		
Rejected ballots		3,872	4.38	▲2.03
Registered electors		134,254		▲12.50
BJP gain from JD		Swing	▲15.83	

=== Assembly Election 1994 ===
1994 Karnataka Legislative Assembly election : Bagalkot
Party	Candidate	Votes	%	±%
JD	Ajay Kumar Sambasadashiv Sarnaik	24,895	32.01	▲0.87
BJP	Pujar Pralhad Hanamantappa	19,019	24.45	▲13.36
INC	Patil Shivangoud Rudragoud	16,275	20.93	▲4.16
Independent	Kanthi Rajashekhar Kidiyappa	9,000	11.57	New
INC	Nayak Bairam Poorappa	4,265	5.48	New
Karnataka Rajya Ryota Sangha	Kuri Basavaraj Rudrappa	2,851	3.67	New
Margin of victory		5,876	7.56	▲0.02
Turnout		79,666	66.76	▼1.20
Total valid votes		77,773		
Rejected ballots		1,869	2.35	▼5.04
Registered electors		119,336		▲3.70
JD hold		Swing	▲0.87	

=== Assembly Election 1989 ===
1989 Karnataka Legislative Assembly election : Bagalkot
Party	Candidate	Votes	%	±%
JD	Ajay Kumar Sambasadashiv Sarnaik	22,551	31.14	New
Independent	Kanthi Rajashekhar Kidiyappa	17,088	23.59	New
INC	Patil Hanamantagouda Bhimanagouda	12,148	16.77	▼24.19
BJP	Pujar Pralhad Hanamantappa	8,034	11.09	▼6.69
AIML	Tarafdar Gaibusab Mohammadgous	7,706	10.64	New
Independent	Yankanchi Mahantesh	1,668	2.30	New
Independent	Magaji Shanmukhsa	1,205	1.66	New
JP	Mulla Nabisab Akabarasab	1,157	1.60	New
Margin of victory		5,463	7.54	▲7.23
Turnout		78,206	67.96	▲2.37
Total valid votes		72,428		
Rejected ballots		5,778	7.39	▲5.38
Registered electors		115,075		▲24.29
JD gain from JP		Swing	▼10.13	

=== Assembly Election 1985 ===
1985 Karnataka Legislative Assembly election : Bagalkot
Party	Candidate	Votes	%	±%
JP	Mantur Goolappa Venkappa	24,557	41.27	New
INC	Kanthi Rajashekhar Kidiyappa	24,373	40.96	▲11.80
BJP	Gachinamath Chandrashekhar Gurapadayya	10,579	17.78	▼10.38
Margin of victory		184	0.31	▼12.87
Turnout		60,732	65.59	▼4.85
Total valid votes		59,509		
Rejected ballots		1,223	2.01	▼1.09
Registered electors		92,589		▲6.12
JP gain from Independent		Swing	▼1.07	

=== Assembly Election 1983 ===
1983 Karnataka Legislative Assembly election : Bagalkot
Party	Candidate	Votes	%	±%
Independent	Mantur Goolappa Venkappa	25,213	42.34	New
INC	Kalligudd Parappa Karabasappa	17,364	29.16	▲25.14
BJP	Hundekar Totappa Malleshappa	16,770	28.16	New
Margin of victory		7,849	13.18	▲4.08
Turnout		61,452	70.44	▲0.78
Total valid votes		59,548		
Rejected ballots		1,904	3.10	▼0.08
Registered electors		87,246		▲13.33
Independent gain from INC(I)		Swing	▼1.67	

=== Assembly Election 1978 ===
1978 Karnataka Legislative Assembly election : Bagalkot
Party	Candidate	Votes	%	±%
INC(I)	Kalligudd Parappa Karabasappa	22,851	44.01	New
JP	Kamble Ganapatarao	18,126	34.91	New
Independent	Tapashetti Chandrasekhar Virupazappa	7,564	14.57	New
INC	Muranal Basappa Tammanna	2,085	4.02	▼43.75
Independent	Chavan Laxman Hemalappa	649	1.25	New
Independent	Desai Ashok Raghavendrarao	645	1.24	New
Margin of victory		4,725	9.10	▲8.68
Turnout		53,627	69.66	▲0.97
Total valid votes		51,920		
Rejected ballots		1,707	3.18	▲3.18
Registered electors		76,981		▲2.81
INC(I) gain from INC		Swing	▼3.76	

=== Assembly Election 1972 ===
1972 Mysore State Legislative Assembly election : Bagalkot
Party	Candidate	Votes	%	±%
INC	Muranal Basappa Tammanna	23,900	47.77	▼10.29
INC(O)	N. P. Mallanagouda	23,688	47.34	New
ABJS	S. B. Virupaxappa	1,434	2.87	▲0.40
SWA	T. A. Dyanamagouda	663	1.33	New
CPI(M)	N. K. Upadhyaya	348	0.70	New
Margin of victory		212	0.42	▼23.98
Turnout		51,432	68.69	▲10.42
Total valid votes		50,033		
Registered electors		74,880		▲16.79
INC hold		Swing	▼10.29	

=== Assembly Election 1967 ===
1967 Mysore State Legislative Assembly election : Bagalkot
Party	Candidate	Votes	%	±%
INC	Muranal Basappa Tammanna	19,903	58.06	▼20.22
Independent	M. T. Karabasappa	11,537	33.65	New
Independent	M. M. Hanamantachrya	1,013	2.95	New
ABJS	K. G. Dattatraya	847	2.47	New
Independent	T. A. Dyanamagouda	556	1.62	New
Independent	T. A. Reddy	426	1.24	New
Margin of victory		8,366	24.40	▼32.17
Turnout		37,362	58.27	▲4.09
Total valid votes		34,282		
Registered electors		64,117		▲11.62
INC hold		Swing	▼20.22	

=== Assembly Election 1962 ===
1962 Mysore State Legislative Assembly election : Bagalkot
Party	Candidate	Votes	%	±%
INC	Muranal Basappa Tammanna	23,212	78.28	▲8.64
ABJS	Ganapat Dattatray Kamble	6,439	21.72	New
Margin of victory		16,773	56.57	▲17.29
Turnout		31,123	54.18	▼5.42
Total valid votes		29,651		
Registered electors		57,441		▲12.58
INC hold		Swing	▲8.64	

=== Assembly Election 1957 ===
1957 Mysore State Legislative Assembly election : Bagalkot
Party	Candidate	Votes	%	±%
INC	Muranal Basappa Tammanna	21,177	69.64	▼8.88
Independent	Saranaik Sharaschandra Alias Babasaheb Shivashiddappa	9,233	30.36	New
Margin of victory		11,944	39.28	▼17.76
Turnout		30,410	59.60	▼4.97
Total valid votes		30,410		
Registered electors		51,024		▲3.77
INC hold		Swing	▼8.88	

=== Assembly Election 1952 ===
1952 Bombay State Legislative Assembly election : Bagalkot
Party	Candidate	Votes	%	±%
INC	Muranal Basappa Tammanna	24,927	78.52	New
KMPP	Desai Gurasiddappa Kadappa	6,819	21.48	New
Margin of victory		18,108	57.04	
Turnout		31,746	64.57	
Total valid votes		31,746		
Registered electors		49,168		
INC win (new seat)				

== See also ==
- List of constituencies of Karnataka Legislative Assembly
