= Bijapur South Lok Sabha constituency =

Former constituency of the Indian parliament in Karnataka

Coordinates: 16.79°N 75.72°E

Bijapur South
- Former Lok Sabha constituency

Constituency details
- Country: India
- Region: South India
- State: Karnataka
- Established: 1952
- Abolished: 1967
- Reservation: None

Bijapur South Lok Sabha constituency was a former Lok Sabha constituency in Karnataka (Bombay State from 1952 to 1956). This seat came into existence in 1951. Before 1967 Lok Sabha Elections, it ceased to exist.

== Assembly segments ==
Bijapur South Lok Sabha constituency comprised the following seven Legislative Assembly segments:

1. Jamkhandi
2. Tikota Bilgi
3. Mudhol
4. Bagalkot
5. Badami
6. Guledgud Kamatgi
7. Hungund

After Bijapur district of erstwhile Bombay State got merged with Mysore State in 1956, this seat became a part of Mysore State and before 1967 Lok Sabha Elections, it ceased to exist and was replaced by Bagalkot Lok Sabha constituency.

== Members of Parliament ==
Bombay State:

- 1951: Bidari Ramappa Balappa, Indian National Congress

Mysore State:

- 1957: Bidari Ramappa Balappa, Indian National Congress
- 1962: Sanganagouda Basanagouda Patil, Indian National Congress
- 1967 onwards:

Bagalkot Lok Sabha constituency

== See also ==
- Bijapur North Lok Sabha constituency
- Bijapur Lok Sabha constituency
- Bagalkot Lok Sabha constituency
- Bijapur district
- Bagalkot district
- List of former constituencies of the Lok Sabha
