= Veerendra Patil =

5th Chief Minister of Karnataka

5th Chief Minister of Karnataka
- In office 30 November 1989 – 10 October 1990
- Preceded by: S. R. Bommai
- Succeeded by: S. Bangarappa

Member of the Karnataka Legislative Assembly
- In office 1989–1994
- Preceded by: Veerayya Swami Mahalingayya
- Succeeded by: Vaijanath Patil
- Constituency: Chincholi

Member of Parliament, Lok Sabha
- In office 1984–1989
- Preceded by: C. M. Stephen
- Succeeded by: B.G. Jawali
- Constituency: Gulbarga
- In office 1980–1984
- Preceded by: Sanganagouda Patil
- Succeeded by: Hanmantagouda Patil
- Constituency: Bagalkot

Member of Parliament, Rajya Sabha
- In office 10 April 1972 – 9 April 1978
- Constituency: Mysore (from 1973 Karnataka)

4th Chief Minister of Mysore State
- In office 29 May 1968 – 18 March 1971
- Preceded by: S. Nijalingappa
- Succeeded by: Devaraj Urs

Member of the Mysore Legislative Assembly
- In office 1957–1967
- Preceded by: G. Ramachari (in Hyderabad LA)
- Succeeded by: V. P. Basappa
- Constituency: Chincholi

Member of the Hyderabad Legislative Assembly
- In office 1952–1956
- Preceded by: Office established
- Succeeded by: Chandrashekhar S. Patil (in Mysore LA)
- Constituency: Aland

Personal details
- Born: 28 February 1924 Chincholi, Hyderabad State, British India (now in Karnataka, India)
- Died: 14 March 1997 (aged 73) Bangalore, Karnataka, India
- Party: Indian National Congress
- Other political affiliations: Indian National Congress (O); Janata Party

Veerendra Basappa Patil (Kannada: ವೀರೇಂದ್ರ ಪಾಟೀಲ್; 28 February 1924 – 14 March 1997) was a senior Indian politician and was twice, the Chief Minister of Karnataka. He became Chief Minister for the first time from 1968–1971 and the second time was almost 18 years later, from 1989–1990.

== Biography ==
Born in a middle-class family in Chincholi in Kalaburagi district, Patil belonged to the dominant Banajiga sub-sect of Lingayat community. He was first made a Deputy minister for Home in the S. Nijalingappa government in 1957. He was elected several times from Chincholi assembly constituency of Gulbarga district to the Karnataka Legislative Assembly. In his youth, Patil teamed up with Ramakrishna Hegde and took control of the Congress organisation in the state. Being young and charismatic ministers in Nijalingappa cabinet, they both were referred as 'Lava-Kusha'. When he moved to federal politics, Nijalingappa chose Patil as his successor.

Patil's first innings as Chief minister lasted 33 months and 10 days. His control over the state administration dispelled the impression that he was just a dummy for his mentor, Nijalingappa, then the president of the All India Congress Committee.

It was during his tenure that the century-old Cauvery water dispute gained ground as Tamil Nadu objected to the irrigation projects in the Cauvery basin. Patil went ahead with the projects even though the Central Water Commission refused to clear them, to protect the interests of the farmers of the south Karnataka region who were heavily dependent on irrigation from Cauvery. Also, It was he who promoted the Karnataka Power Corporation and separated the state electricity board from the responsibility of generating power.

However, Patil was also charged with favouring his Lingayat (Banajiga) community. After the Congress split in 1969, Patil's Congress (O) party remained in power in the state until 1971 and crashed to a dismal defeat in the state assembly election in 1972 at the hands of Congress (I).

Later, Patil returned to the hub of state politics as chief of the Janata Party's Karnataka state unit. He sacrified in the 1978 Lok Sabha by-election in Chikmagalur which featured Indira Gandhi in the fray. Through the often acrimonious campaign, Patil, who was the candidate of the Janata Party, refused to indulge in personal attacks on Indira Gandhi. The same year, he lost his Rajya Sabha seat to Hegde. When he lost the state Janata Party presidency to H.D. Deve Gowda, Patil moved over to Indira Gandhi's Congress-I.

The twin defections of Veerendra Patil in Karnataka and Hitendra Desai in Gujarat turned around the fortunes of Congress(I), which otherwise had a spate of allegations against it. Winning election to the Lok Sabha from Bagalkot, he became Union Labour and Petroleum minister. However, he was later dropped from the Cabinet.

He won Gulbarga seat in 1984 Indian general elections by defeating Vidyadhar Guruji, a former MLA from Gurmitkal.

With none of the state congress leaders able to draw the masses, the state leadership fell onto Veerendra Patil's shoulders. As state party chief in Rajiv Gandhi's time, Patil reinvigorated the Congress in the state. The anti incumbency wave and the split in the Janata party resulted in a landslide victory for the Congress in November 1989. Veerendra Patil had led the election campaign on twin promises: Water & Transport facility to every village. Congress won 178 out of 224 MLA seats, which is its largest victory to-date (2020).

With fiscal deficit reigning high & diminishing returns, Veerendra Patil took charge at a difficult time. He appointed M. Rajasekara Murthy as finance minister. The duo attacked the seconds liquor lobby by hiking the export duty by 10 times, from 2% to 20%. This had the dual-effect of reducing seconds-liquor consumption and also boosting the revenue of state government. Patil's chose to take on the liquor lobby, at the risk of angering many benefactors of his party. He stuck to the line that his duty was first to the state and then, next to his party. This honesty proved dearly to him, though he became widely popular among the woman-folk of the state.

His efforts to streamline the administration and stem the rot in the secretariat was acclaimed by many. However, in October 1990 communal riots broke out in some parts of the state due to newly emerged BJP's rath yatras and communal politics. He was removed by the then Congress President Rajiv Gandhi and succeeded by Sarekoppa Bangarappa.

Patil never recouped after this incident. His health failed him and he decided against contesting the 1994 Karnataka Legislative Assembly election. Congress lost miserably and could not even become the main opposition party in that election.

He died on 14 March 1997 in Bangalore.

== Position Held ==
Position	Constituency	From	To	Ministry	Party
Hyderabad					
Member of the Legislative Assembly	Aland	1952	1956		
Mysore					
Member of the Legislative Assembly	Chincholi	1957	1967		
Minister of:	Chincholi				
Home; Industries	Chincholi	19 April 1957	16 May 1958	Nijalingappa II	
Excise; Prohibition; Rural Industries	Chincholi	February 1961	9 March 1962	Jatti	
Minister of Public Works and Transport	Chincholi	14 March 1962	20 June 1962	Kanthi	
Public Works Department	Chincholi	21 June 1962	28 February 1967	Nijalingappa III	
Public Works Department	???	15 March 1967	28 May 1968	Nijalingappa IV	
Chief Minister					
Chief Minister of Mysore	???	29 May 1968	18 March 1971	Patil I	Indian National Congress (O)
Rajya Sabha					
Member of Parliament, Rajya Sabha	Mysore (Karnataka; after 1973)	10 April 1972	9 April 1978		Indian National Congress (O)
Lok Sabha					
Member of Parliament, Lok Sabha	Bagalkot	1980	1984		Indian National Congress (I)
Minister of Petroleum and Chemicals	Bagalkot	7 March 1980	19 October 1980	Indira IV	Indian National Congress (I)
Minister of Labour and Rehabilitation	Bagalkot	2 September 1982	31 October 1984	Indira IV	Indian National Congress (I)
Minister of Labour and Rehabilitation	Bagalkot	4 November 1984	31 December 1984	Rajiv I	Indian National Congress (I)
Minister of Shipping and Transport	Bagalkot	19 October 1980	2 September 1982	Indira IV	Indian National Congress (I)
Minister of Shipping and Transport	Bagalkot	7 September 1984	31 October 1984	Indira IV	Indian National Congress (I)
Minister of Shipping and Transport	Bagalkot	4 November 1984	31 December 1984	Rajiv I	Indian National Congress (I)
Member of Parliament, Lok Sabha	Gulbarga	1984	1989		Indian National Congress (I)
Minister of Industry and Company Affairs	Gulbarga	14 January 1985	25 September 1985	Rajiv II	Indian National Congress (I)
Legislative Assembly					
Member of the Legislative Assembly	Chincholi	1989	1994		
Chief Minister of Karnataka	Chincholi	30 November 1989	10 October 1990	Patil II	

Political offices
Preceded by S.Nijalingappa	Chief Minister of Karnataka; 29 May 1968 – 18 March 1971	Succeeded by President's rule
Preceded by President's Rule	Chief Minister of Karnataka; 30 November 1989 – 10 October 1990	Succeeded by S.Bangarappa
