= Jagadish Gudagunti =

Indian politician (born 1955)

Member of the Karnataka Legislative Assembly
- Incumbent
- Assumed office 15 May 2023
- Preceded by: Anand Nyamagouda
- Constituency: Jamkhandi

Personal details
- Party: Bharatiya Janata Party

Jagadish Shivayya Gudagunti (born 1955) is an Indian politician from Karnataka. He is a member of the Karnataka Legislative Assembly from Jamkhandi Assembly constituency in Bagalkot district. He won the 2023 Karnataka Legislative Assembly election representing the Bharatiya Janata Party.

== Early life and education ==
Gudagunti is from Jamkhandi, Bagalkot district, Karnataka. His father is Shivayya Gudagunti. He completed his Diploma in Mechanical Engineering in 1972 at Basaveshwar Engineering College, Bagalkote.

== Career ==
Gudagunti was elected as an MLA for the first time from Jamkhandi Assembly constituency representing the Bharatiya Janata Party in the 2023 Karnataka Legislative Assembly election. He polled 81,937 votes and defeated his nearest rival, Anand Siddu Nyamagouda of the Indian National Congress, by a margin of 4,716 votes. In 2013 Karnataka Legislative Assembly election, he contested as an independent candidate and polled 27,993 votes but lost to Nyamagouda of the Congress by a margin of 21,152 votes. Nyamagouda got 49,145 votes.

In October 2023, members of Dalit Sangharsh Samiti staged a protest in Jamkhandi condemning the statement of Gudagunti, who allegedly gave a call to the backward communities to shun reservations. They demanded an apology from the local MLA.
