= Ron Assembly constituency =

Legislative Assembly constituency in Karnataka State, India

Coordinates: 15.7°N 75.73°E

Ron
- Constituency No. 67 for the Karnataka Legislative Assembly

Constituency details
- Country: India
- Region: South India
- State: Karnataka
- District: Gadag
- Lok Sabha constituency: Haveri
- Established: 1951
- Total electors: 232,510
- Reservation: None

Member of Legislative Assembly
- 16th Karnataka Legislative Assembly
- Incumbent Gurupadagouda Patil
- Party: Indian National Congress
- Elected year: 2023
- Preceded by: Kalakappa Bandi

Ron Assembly constituency is one of the 224 Legislative Assembly constituencies of Karnataka in India.

It is part of Gadag district.

== Members of the Legislative Assembly ==
Election	Member	Party
1952	Andanappa Doddameti	Indian National Congress
1957	Andanappa Doddameti	Indian National Congress
1962	Andanappa Doddameti	Indian National Congress
1967	Andanappa Doddameti	Indian National Congress
1972	A. V. Patil	Indian National Congress
1978	Muthikatti Veerabhadrappa Adiveppa	Indian National Congress
1983	Doddameti Jananadev Shivanagappa	Janata Party
1985	Doddameti Jananadev Shivanagappa	Janata Party
1989	Gurupadagouda Patil	Indian National Congress
1994	Bidarur Shrishailappa Virupaxappa	Janata Dal
1999	Gurupadagouda Patil	Indian National Congress
2004	Kalakappa Gurushantappa Bandi	Bharatiya Janata Party
2008	Kalakappa Gurushantappa Bandi	Bharatiya Janata Party
2013	Gurupadagouda Patil	Indian National Congress
2018	Kalakappa Gurushantappa Bandi	Bharatiya Janata Party
2023	Gurupadagouda Patil	Indian National Congress

== Election results ==
=== Assembly Election 2023 ===
2023 Karnataka Legislative Assembly election : Ron
Party	Candidate	Votes	%	±%
INC	Gurupadagouda Patil	94,865	53.24%	▲8.45
BJP	Kalakappa Gurushantappa Bandi	70,177	39.38%	▼9.71
AAP	Anekal Doddaiah	8,839	4.96%	New
NOTA	None of the above	1,600	0.90%	▼0.67
Independent	Shivanand Shankrappa Rathod	1,463	0.82%	New
Margin of victory		24,688	13.85%	▲9.55
Turnout		178,346	76.70%	▲0.85
Total valid votes		178,196		
Registered electors		232,510		▲3.34
INC gain from BJP		Swing	▲4.15	

=== Assembly Election 2018 ===
2018 Karnataka Legislative Assembly election : Ron
Party	Candidate	Votes	%	±%
BJP	Kalakappa Bandi	83,735	49.09%	▲5.27
INC	Gurupadagouda Patil	76,401	44.79%	▼13.20
JD(S)	Ravindranath Jambunath Doddameti	3,421	2.01%	▼2.91
NOTA	None of the above	2,671	1.57%	New
Independent	Sunilkumar Bahmanapad	1,813	1.06%	New
CPI(M)	Mallikarjun Hadapad	1,177	0.69%	New
Margin of victory		7,334	4.30%	▼9.87
Turnout		170,656	75.85%	▲1.26
Total valid votes		170,561		
Registered electors		224,989		▲14.94
BJP gain from INC		Swing	▼8.90	

=== Assembly Election 2013 ===
2013 Karnataka Legislative Assembly election : Ron
Party	Candidate	Votes	%	±%
INC	Gurupadagouda Patil	74,593	57.99%	▲17.52
BJP	Kalakappa Gurushantappa Bandi	56,366	43.82%	▲1.81
JD(S)	Hemagirish Gurupadappa Havinal	6,334	4.92%	▼3.94
Independent	Rangangouda Vasudevagouda Patil	1,976	1.54%	New
BSRCP	Ashok V. Bavenakatti	1,636	1.27%	New
Independent	Mallikarjungouda B. Sankanagoudra	1,472	1.14%	New
KJP	Sharnappa Basappa Menashinkai	1,372	1.07%	New
BSP	Nigabasappa Ramappa Doddamani	1,210	0.94%	▲0.26
Margin of victory		18,227	14.17%	▲12.64
Turnout		146,006	74.59%	▲7.62
Total valid votes		128,630		
Registered electors		195,737		▲9.80
INC gain from BJP		Swing	▲15.98	

=== Assembly Election 2008 ===
2008 Karnataka Legislative Assembly election : Ron
Party	Candidate	Votes	%	±%
BJP	Kalakappa Gurushantappa Bandi	50,145	42.01%	▼7.50
INC	Gurupadagouda Patil	48,315	40.47%	▼0.50
JD(S)	Dandin Ravi Bisttappa	10,577	8.86%	▲6.85
Independent	Hosalli Prakash Mukappa	2,724	2.28%	New
Independent	Panchayya V. Hiremath	2,452	2.05%	New
Independent	Shrishailappa Kariyappa Bellikoppa	1,392	1.17%	New
BSP	Mohan K. Hiregoudar	815	0.68%	New
SP	Amareswar Gundappa Budihal	809	0.68%	New
Margin of victory		1,830	1.53%	▼7.01
Turnout		119,379	66.97%	▲0.02
Total valid votes		119,377		
Registered electors		178,268		▲26.46
BJP hold		Swing	▼7.50	

=== Assembly Election 2004 ===
2004 Karnataka Legislative Assembly election : Ron
Party	Candidate	Votes	%	±%
BJP	Kalakappa Gurushantappa Bandi	46,733	49.51%	New
INC	Gurupadagouda Patil	38,668	40.97%	▼15.93
JP	Ashok M. Naval Gund	3,355	3.55%	New
JD(S)	Vishwabrahman Manjunath Bhimarao	1,898	2.01%	▼20.30
Kannada Nadu Party	Budihal Nagesh Andanappa	1,312	1.39%	New
Independent	Neelappa Fakirappa Tegginamani	1,291	1.37%	New
KRRS	Gowdar Lokanagouda Santagouda	1,127	1.19%	New
Margin of victory		8,065	8.54%	▼26.05
Turnout		94,384	66.95%	▼1.24
Total valid votes		94,384		
Registered electors		140,970		▲8.37
BJP gain from INC		Swing	▼7.39	

=== Assembly Election 1999 ===
1999 Karnataka Legislative Assembly election : Ron
Party	Candidate	Votes	%	±%
INC	Gurupadagouda Patil	47,957	56.90%	▲16.76
JD(S)	Bidarur Shrishailappa Virupaxappa	18,802	22.31%	New
JD(U)	Ashok M. Naval Gund	11,137	13.21%	New
Independent	Amareswar Budihal	2,229	2.64%	New
BSP	Lakshman. D. Talwar	2,003	2.38%	New
Independent	Neelappa Fakirappa Tegginamani	1,186	1.41%	New
Independent	Ramappa Dodda Veerappa Jangannavar	965	1.15%	New
Margin of victory		29,155	34.59%	▲23.33
Turnout		88,707	68.19%	▼0.85
Total valid votes		84,279		
Rejected ballots		4,343	4.90%	▲0.97
Registered electors		130,088		▲12.92
INC gain from JD		Swing	▲5.49	

=== Assembly Election 1994 ===
1994 Karnataka Legislative Assembly election : Ron
Party	Candidate	Votes	%	±%
JD	Bidarur Shrishailappa Virupaxappa	39,268	51.41%	▲21.50
INC	Gurupadagouda Patil	30,664	40.14%	▼5.86
BJP	Subhas Mahalingappa Savadi	2,402	3.14%	New
KRRS	Sureshbabu Patil	1,987	2.60%	New
INC	Shivarudarappa Veerappa Sankanur	1,170	1.53%	New
Independent	S. R. Meti Advocate	601	0.79%	New
Margin of victory		8,604	11.26%	▼4.83
Turnout		79,536	69.04%	▲0.07
Total valid votes		76,386		
Rejected ballots		3,126	3.93%	▼2.41
Registered electors		115,208		▲4.97
JD gain from INC		Swing	▲5.41	

=== Assembly Election 1989 ===
1989 Karnataka Legislative Assembly election : Ron
Party	Candidate	Votes	%	±%
INC	Gurupadagouda Patil	32,610	46.00%	▲6.05
JD	Doddameti Jananadev Shivanagappa	21,203	29.91%	New
Independent	Ashok Devraj Bagmar	12,388	17.47%	New
Kranti Sabha	Vijaykumarsarj Shivalingsarj Desai	3,686	5.20%	New
JP	Savalagi Rajendra Ningappa	579	0.82%	New
Margin of victory		11,407	16.09%	▼2.64
Turnout		75,694	68.97%	▲1.23
Total valid votes		70,895		
Rejected ballots		4,799	6.34%	▲3.75
Registered electors		109,749		▲26.28
INC gain from JP		Swing	▼12.68	

=== Assembly Election 1985 ===
1985 Karnataka Legislative Assembly election : Ron
Party	Candidate	Votes	%	±%
JP	Doddameti Jananadev Shivanagappa	33,653	58.68%	▼0.42
INC	Patil Rudragouda Sanganagouda	22,911	39.95%	▲0.86
Independent	Hiremani Balappa Veerappa	428	0.75%	New
Independent	Itagi Shivappa Ningappa	361	0.63%	New
Margin of victory		10,742	18.73%	▼1.28
Turnout		58,876	67.74%	▲1.57
Total valid votes		57,353		
Rejected ballots		1,523	2.59%	▼0.99
Registered electors		86,910		▲3.32
JP hold		Swing	▼0.42	

=== Assembly Election 1983 ===
1983 Karnataka Legislative Assembly election : Ron
Party	Candidate	Votes	%	±%
JP	Doddameti Jananadev Shivanagappa	31,721	59.10%	▲19.06
INC	Muthikatti Veerabhadrappa Adiveppa	20,979	39.09%	▲35.63
Independent	Daragad Hussainsab Imamsaheb	971	1.81%	New
Margin of victory		10,742	20.01%	▲8.72
Turnout		55,665	66.17%	▼1.21
Total valid votes		53,671		
Rejected ballots		1,994	3.58%	▼0.29
Registered electors		84,118		▲5.35
JP gain from INC(I)		Swing	▲7.77	

=== Assembly Election 1978 ===
1978 Karnataka Legislative Assembly election : Ron
Party	Candidate	Votes	%	±%
INC(I)	Muthikatti Veerabhadrappa Adiveppa	26,546	51.33%	New
JP	Pujar Neelagangayya Basayya	20,709	40.04%	New
Independent	Balutagi Durgappa Kanumappa	2,671	5.16%	New
INC	Daragad Husenasab Imamsab	1,791	3.46%	▼55.13
Margin of victory		5,837	11.29%	▼9.92
Turnout		53,799	67.38%	▲4.78
Total valid votes		51,717		
Rejected ballots		2,082	3.87%	▲3.87
Registered electors		79,843		▲36.60
INC(I) gain from INC		Swing	▼7.26	

=== Assembly Election 1972 ===
1972 Mysore State Legislative Assembly election : Ron
Party	Candidate	Votes	%	±%
INC	A. V. Patil	20,567	58.59%	▼3.30
Independent	N. Basayya Pujal	13,121	37.38%	New
ABJS	Balappa Irappa Hiremani	1,413	4.03%	New
Margin of victory		7,446	21.21%	▼2.57
Turnout		36,590	62.60%	▼7.70
Total valid votes		35,101		
Registered electors		58,450		▲10.94
INC hold		Swing	▼3.30	

=== Assembly Election 1967 ===
1967 Mysore State Legislative Assembly election : Ron
Party	Candidate	Votes	%	±%
INC	Andanappa Doddameti	21,573	61.89%	▼2.03
Independent	P. M. Sanganagouda	13,285	38.11%	New
Margin of victory		8,288	23.78%	▼10.85
Turnout		37,038	70.30%	▲5.50
Total valid votes		34,858		
Registered electors		52,685		▲9.30
INC hold		Swing	▼2.03	

=== Assembly Election 1962 ===
1962 Mysore State Legislative Assembly election : Ron
Party	Candidate	Votes	%	±%
INC	Andanappa Doddameti	18,640	63.92%	▲8.10
Independent	Sivamurtayya Madiwalayya Math	8,543	29.30%	New
ABJS	Dattajirao Sadasivarao Kulkarni	1,978	6.78%	New
Margin of victory		10,097	34.63%	▲22.99
Turnout		31,235	64.80%	▼5.97
Total valid votes		29,161		
Registered electors		48,203		▲6.77
INC hold		Swing	▲8.10	

=== Assembly Election 1957 ===
1957 Mysore State Legislative Assembly election : Ron
Party	Candidate	Votes	%	±%
INC	Andanappa Doddameti	17,836	55.82%	▼14.52
Independent	Patil Andanagouda Veeranagouda	14,116	44.18%	New
Margin of victory		3,720	11.64%	▼29.04
Turnout		31,952	70.77%	▲4.46
Total valid votes		31,952		
Registered electors		45,146		▼17.70
INC hold		Swing	▼14.52	

=== Assembly Election 1952 ===
1952 Bombay State Legislative Assembly election : Ron
Party	Candidate	Votes	%	±%
INC	Andanappa Doddameti	25,585	70.34%	New
Independent	Patil Veerangauda Kalangauda	10,789	29.66%	New
Margin of victory		14,796	40.68%	
Turnout		36,374	66.31%	
Total valid votes		36,374		
Registered electors		54,854		
INC win (new seat)				

== See also ==
- List of constituencies of the Karnataka Legislative Assembly
- Gadag district
