= Sanganagouda Basanagouda Patil =

Indian politician (1925–2001)

Sanganagouda Basanagouda Patil (23 November 1925 – 20 December 2001) was an Indian politician who was a member of Lok Sabha for Bijapur South in the then state of Mysore.

== Early life ==
Patil was born in Sunag, Bijapur district. He is a freedom fighter and was first elected as an MP in 1962 from Bagalkot Lok Sabha constituency in 1967.

== Career ==
Patil became a member of the 3rd Lok Sabha after winning the Bijapur South seat in the 1962 Lok Sabha election in the then state Mysore. He was elected to 4th, 5th and 6th Lok Sabha from Bagalkot constituency in the state of Karnataka.

Patil died in Bagalkot on 20 December 2001, at the age of 76.
