= Siddu Savadi =

Indian politician (born 1959)

Siddu Savadi (born 22 July 1959) is an Indian politician from Karnataka. He has served three terms in the Karnataka Legislative Assembly from the Terdal Assembly constituency which is in Bagalkot district. He most recently won the 2023 Karnataka Legislative Assembly election as a member of the Bharatiya Janata Party.

== Early life and education ==
Savadi is from Terdal, Bagalkot district. His father Kallappa Savadi was a farmer. He did his schooling at Sri Prabhulingeshwar High School, Terdal, and passed his Class X in 1976. Thereafter, he discontinued his studies.

== Career ==
He became an MLA for the first time winning the 2008 Karnataka Legislative Assembly election representing the Terdal Assembly constituency for the Bharatiya Janata Party. He was defeated by actor Umashree in the 2013 Karnataka Legislative Assembly election, but regained his seat in the 2018 Karnataka Legislative Assembly election. He was re-elected in the 2023 Assembly election. In the latter election, he received 77,265 votes and defeated his nearest rival, Siddappa Ramappa Konnur of the Indian National Congress, by a margin of 10,745 votes.
