= Shrama Bindu Sagar =

- Location of Shrama Bindu Sagar in Karnataka
- Country: India
- Location: Jamkhandi, Bagalkot district, Karnataka
- Coordinates: 16.5675°N 75.3896°E
- Purpose: Irrigation
- Status: Operational
- Construction began: 1988
- Opening date: 1989

Dam and spillways
- Type of dam: Barrage
- Height (foundation): 7 meters
- Length: 430 m (1,410 ft)

Reservoir
- Creates: Shrama Bindu Sagar
- Total capacity: 3 TMC
- Catchment area: Krishna River basin

Shrama Bindu Sagar is a barrage built across the Krishna River near Jamkhandi town in Karnataka, India. It was constructed in 1989 with the help of local farmers who collectively financed the project to meet irrigation needs in the region.

== Background and history ==
The construction of Shrama Bindu Sagar began under the leadership of Siddu Nyamagouda, a farmer leader who gained political recognition by defeating former chief minister Ramakrishna Hegde in a parliamentary election and later served as a union minister in the Narasimha Rao government. During the 1980s, farmers in the region lacked adequate irrigation facilities despite the presence of the Krishna River. The government's initial response to the farmers' request for a barrage was to collect a significant amount of money before providing any grants.

Nyamagouda worked with local farmers to form an association called the Krishna Teera Rait Sangh (Krishna Bank Farmers' Association). The barrage was constructed without any government funding, with farmers bearing the entire cost. The project stored 3 TMC (thousand million cubic feet) of water and irrigated approximately 30,000 acres of land. The barrage is 430 meters long and 7 meters deep and took one year to complete.

Initially, the stored water was sufficient to irrigate the lands. However, as the irrigated area expanded to 70,000 acres, water shortages began to recur. In response, farmers demanded the release of Krishna water from Maharashtra. In 2013–2014, Nyamagouda and his team raised the height of the barrage by 1.5 meters using 25 high-powered pumps. These pumps were employed to lift water from the river during periods of low natural inflow, particularly in the winter months when the Krishna River's flow diminished.

== Legacy ==
The state government named the barrage Shramabindu Sagara in honor of Siddu Nyamagouda, who died in a car accident in 2018.
