= K. Chengalaraya Reddy ministry =

Government of Mysore, India (1947–1952)

- 1st Council of Ministers of Mysore State
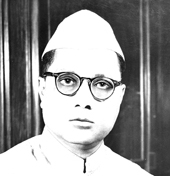
- K. C. Reddy
- Date formed: 25 October 1947
- Date dissolved: 30 March 1952

People and organisations
- Head of state: Jayachamarajendra Wadiyar; 26 January 1950 – 1 November 1956 (As Rajpramukh of Mysore)
- Head of government: K. C. Reddy
- Member parties: Indian National Congress
- Status in legislature: Legislative Assembly not established

History
- Election: Legislative Assembly not established
- Outgoing election: 1952
- Legislature term: 6 years (Council)
- Predecessor: Office Established
- Successor: Hanumanthaiah ministry

K. C. Reddy Ministry was the Council of Ministers in Mysore, a state in South India headed by K. Chengalaraya Reddy of the Indian National Congress.

The ministry had multiple ministers including the Chief Minister of Mysore. All ministers belonged to the Indian National Congress.

After independence of India in 1947, he was at the forefront of the Mysore Chalo movement seeking responsible state government in Mysore State and went on to become the first Chief Minister of the state after Jayachamarajendra Wadiyar, the Maharaja of Mysore signed the Instrument of Accession to join the new dominion of India on three subjects, namely, defence, external affairs, communications and hence Mysore did not lose its sovereignty on other subjects. The Constitution of India was adopted by the Indian Constituent Assembly on 26 November 1949 and came into effect on 26 January 1950 with a democratic government system, completing the country's transition towards becoming an independent republic replacing the Government of India Act (1935) as the governing document of India and thus, turning the nation into a newly formed republic.

Mysore became a Part-B state of the union because Maharaja of Mysore issued a proclamation on this regard on 25 November 1949.

K. C. Reddy Ministry was an adhoc arrangement from 25 October 1947 (even though India became Republic on 26 January 1950) till the first election under Adult franchise was held in 1952 and Kengal Hanumanthaiah was elected as Chief Minister of Mysore post elections there by ending the unscheduled tenure of K. C. Reddy Ministry.

== Chief Minister & Cabinet Ministers ==
S.No	Portfolio	Name	Portrait	Constituency	Term of Office		Party
1	Chief Minister *Other departments not allocated to any Minister.	K. Chengalaraya Reddy		Legislative Assembly not established	25 October 1947	30 March 1952	Indian National Congress
2	Transport; Food and civil Supplies	T. Mariappa		Legislative Assembly not established	1950	30 March 1952	Indian National Congress
3	Home	T. Mariappa		Legislative Assembly not established	25 October 1947	30 March 1952	Indian National Congress
4	Mysore railways; Mysore Army	T. Mariappa		Legislative Assembly not established	25 October 1947	1950	Indian National Congress
4	Mysore railways; Mysore Army	T. Siddalingaya		MLC	1950	30 March 1952	Indian National Congress
5	Finance; Industries	H. C. Dasappa		Legislative Assembly not established	25 October 1947	30 March 1952	Indian National Congress
6	Public Works; Revenue	H. Siddaiah		Legislative Assembly not established	25 October 1947	30 March 1952	Indian National Congress
7	Law; Labour	K. T. Bhashyam		Legislative Assembly not established	25 October 1947	30 March 1952	Indian National Congress
8	Local Self-Government	R. Chennigaramaiah		Legislative Assembly not established	25 October 1947	30 March 1952	Indian National Congress
9	Public Health; Excise	Janab Mohmood Shariff		Legislative Assembly not established	25 October 1947	30 March 1952	Indian National Congress
10	Education	D. H. Chandrasekhariaya		Legislative Assembly not established	25 October 1947	30 March 1952	Indian National Congress
11	City Municipalities; Muzarai	P. Subbarama Chetty		Legislative Assembly not established	25 October 1947	30 March 1952	Indian National Congress

== See also ==
- Mysore Legislative Assembly
- Mysore Legislative Council
- Politics of Mysore
