= First Nijalingappa ministry =

Government of Mysore, India (1956–57)

- 4th Council of Ministers of Mysore State
- Basavaraj Bommai ministry
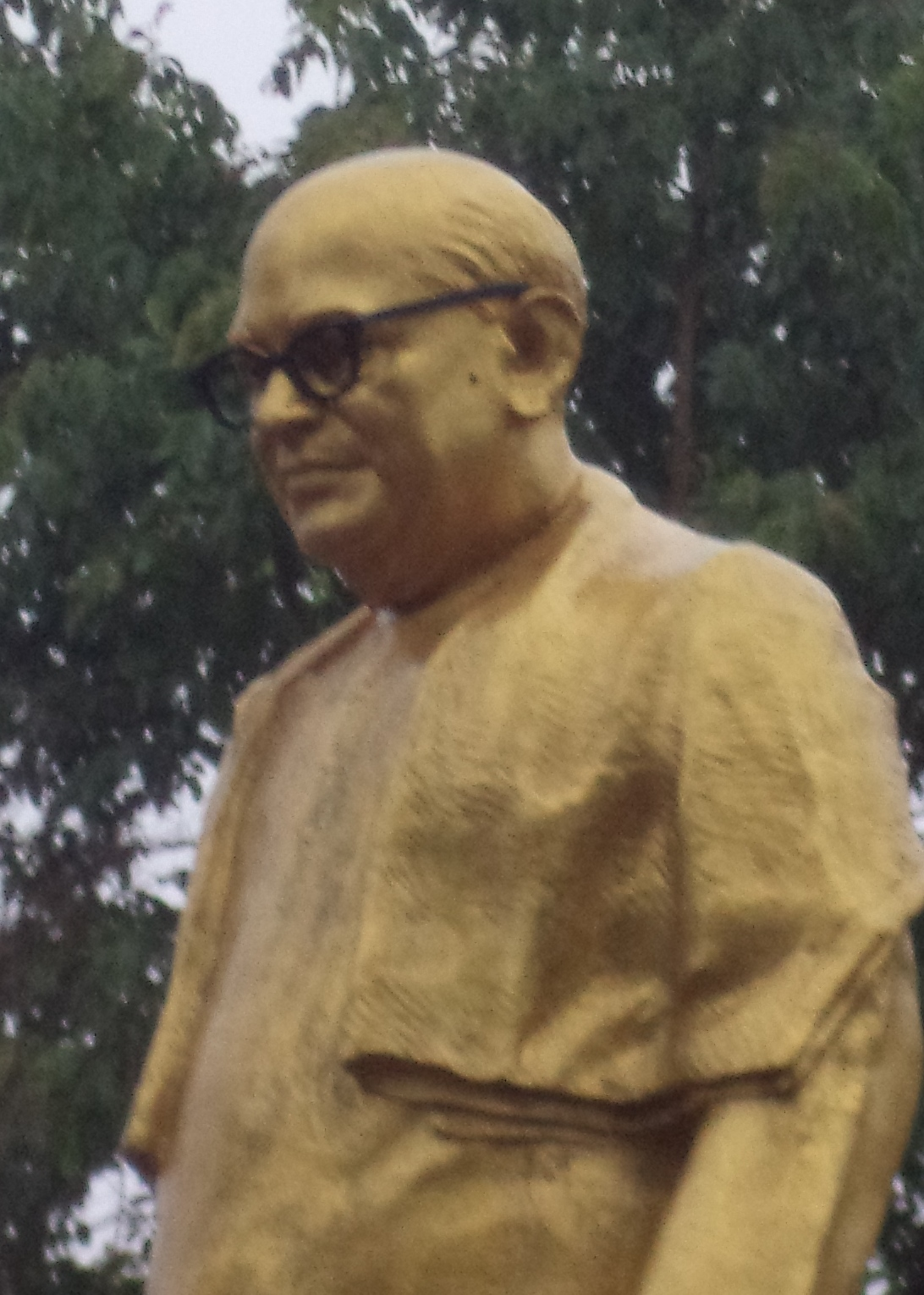
- S. Nijalingappa
- Date formed: 1 November 1956
- Date dissolved: 1 April 1957

People and organisations
- Head of state: Jayachamarajendra Wadiyar; 1 November 1956 – 4 May 1963 (As Governor of Mysore)
- Head of government: S. Nijalingappa
- Member parties: Indian National Congress
- Status in legislature: Majority

History
- Election: 1952
- Outgoing election: 1957
- Legislature terms: 6 years (Council); 5 years (Assembly)
- Predecessor: Manjappa ministry
- Successor: Second Nijalingappa ministry

First S. Nijalingappa Ministry was the Council of Ministers in Mysore, a state in South India headed by S. Nijalingappa of the Indian National Congress.

The ministry had multiple ministers including the Chief Minister. All ministers belonged to the Indian National Congress.

S. Nijalingappa became Chief minister of Mysore after Kadidal Manjappa resigned as Chief Minister of Mysore on 31 October 1956 following Unification of Karnataka.

== Chief Minister and cabinet ministers ==
S.No	Portfolio	Name	Portrait	Constituency	Term of Office		Party
1.	Chief Minister *Other departments not allocated to any Minister.	S. Nijalingappa		None	1 November 1956	1 April 1957	Indian National Congress
2.		Kadidal Manjappa		Tirthahalli	1 November 1956	1 April 1957	Indian National Congress
3.	Finance	T. Mariappa		Nagamangala	1 November 1956	1 April 1957	Indian National Congress
4.	Home	M. V. Rama Rao		Tumkur	1 November 1956	1 April 1957	Indian National Congress

== See also ==
- Mysore Legislative Assembly
- Mysore Legislative Council
- Politics of Mysore
