= Second Nijalingappa ministry =

Government of Mysore, India (1957–58)

- 5th Council of Ministers of Mysore State
- Second Siddaramaiah ministry
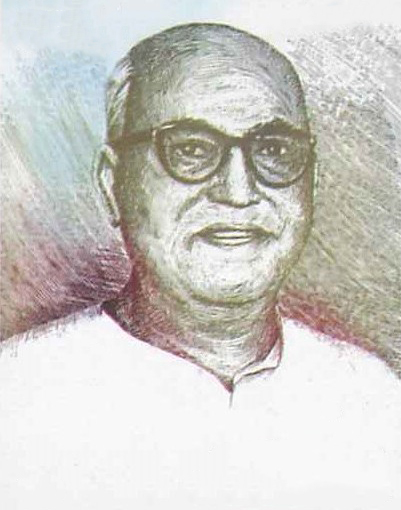
- S. Nijalingappa
- Date formed: 19 April 1957
- Date dissolved: 16 May 1958

People and organisations
- Head of state: Jayachamarajendra Wadiyar; 1 November 1956 – 4 May 1963 (As Governor of Mysore)
- Head of government: S. Nijalingappa
- Member parties: Indian National Congress
- Status in legislature: Majority

History
- Election: 1957
- Outgoing election: 1962 (After Jatti ministry)
- Legislature terms: 6 years (Council); 5 years (Assembly)
- Predecessor: First Nijalingappa ministry
- Successor: Jatti ministry

Second S. Nijalingappa Ministry was the Council of Ministers in Mysore, a state in South India headed by S. Nijalingappa of the Indian National Congress.

The ministry had multiple ministers including the Chief Minister of Mysore. All ministers belonged to the Indian National Congress.

S. Nijalingappa became Chief minister of Mysore after Indian National Congress emerged victorious 1957 Mysore elections.

== Chief Minister & Cabinet Ministers ==
S.No	Portfolio	Name	Portrait	Constituency	Term of Office		Party
1.	Chief Minister *Other departments not allocated to any Minister.	S. Nijalingappa		Molakalmuru	19 April 1957	16 May 1958	Indian National Congress
2.	Finance; Sericulture	T. Mariappa		Nagamangala	19 April 1957	16 May 1958	Indian National Congress
3.	Education	V. Venkatappa		MLC	19 April 1957	16 May 1958	Indian National Congress

== Minister of State / Deputy Ministers ==
S.No	Portfolio	Name	Portrait	Constituency	Term of Office		Party
1	Home; Industries	Veerendra Patil		Chincholi	19 April 1957	16 May 1958	Indian National Congress

== See also ==
- Mysore Legislative Assembly
- Mysore Legislative Council
- Politics of Mysore
