= Manjappa ministry =

Government of Mysore, India in 1956

- 3rd Council of Ministers of Mysore State
- Basavaraj Bommai ministry
- Date formed: 19 August 1956
- Date dissolved: 31 October 1956

People and organisations
- Head of state: Jayachamarajendra Wadiyar; 26 January 1950 – 1 November 1956 (As Rajpramukh of Mysore)
- Head of government: Kadidal Manjappa
- Member parties: Indian National Congress
- Status in legislature: Majority

History
- Election: 1952
- Outgoing election: 1957 (After First Nijalingappa ministry)
- Legislature terms: 6 years (Council); 5 years (Assembly)
- Predecessor: Hanumanthaiah ministry
- Successor: First Nijalingappa ministry

Kadidal Manjappa Ministry was the Council of Ministers in Mysore, a state in South India headed by Kadidal Manjappa of the Indian National Congress.

The ministry had multiple ministers including the Chief Minister of Mysore. All ministers belonged to the Indian National Congress.

Kadidal Manjappa became Chief Minister of Mysore after resignation of Kengal Hanumanthaiah. Manjappa resigned as Chief Minister of Mysore following Unification of Karnataka.

== Chief Minister & Cabinet Ministers ==
| S.No | Portfolio | Name | Portrait | Constituency | Term of Office | | Party |
|---|---|---|---|---|---|---|---|
| 1. | Chief Minister *Other departments not allocated to any Minister. | Kadidal Manjappa | | Tirthahalli | 19 August 1956 | 31 October 1956 | Indian National Congress |

== See also ==
- Mysore Legislative Assembly
- Mysore Legislative Council
- Politics of Mysore
