= Shantaveri Gopala Gowda =

Indian socialist, politician

Member of the Mysore Legislative Assembly
- In office 1962–1972
- Preceded by: A. R. Badri Narayan
- Succeeded by: Konanduru Lingappa
- Constituency: Tirthahalli
- In office 1952–1957
- Preceded by: Constituency established
- Succeeded by: Constituency abolished
- Constituency: Sagar Hosanagar

Personal details
- Born: 14 March 1923 Araga, Thirthahalli, Kingdom of Mysore
- Died: 9 June 1972 (aged 49) Bangalore, Karnataka, India
- Spouse: Sonakka (m. 1964)
- Children: 2
- Known for: Socialist movement in Karnataka

Shantaveri Gopala Gowda (14 March 1923 – 9 June 1972) was an Indian socialist politician who was thrice elected to the Legislative Assembly of Karnataka, in 1952, 1962 and 1967. He is considered one of India's most important socialist leaders, and a pioneer of socialism in Karnataka. He was influenced by Ram Manohar Lohia. His leadership began as early as 1951. He was considered "charismatic" and he gained many followers. He mentored several socialists in Karnataka including J. H. Patel, Bangarappa, S. M. Krishna and D. Devaraj Urs, al of who would go on to become chief ministers of the state. Urs was inspired and understood the depth of Gowda's mind and life which was devoted to the poor and working classes, especially the farmers. The Land Reforms Act and renaming of the state from Mysore to Karnataka are thanks to his association with Gowda.

== Early life ==
Gopala Gowda was born in Araga, a village in the Thirthahalli taluk of the erstwhile Kingdom of Mysore (in present-day Shimoga district, Karnataka), into a Vokkaliga family. His father was Kollurayya Gowda, who worked as a postal constable, and mother Sheshamma, a homemaker. Gowda had two older siblings: brother Dharmayya and sister Siddhamma. He completed his primary schooling in Araga, and lower secondary in Shikaripura. While pursuing his matriculation, Gowda got involved in the independence movement, and took part in the Quit India Movement in 1942. He was arrested on charges of cutting the telegraph lines. During his time at the Shimoga prison, he met personalities such as Gorur Ramaswamy Iyengar, K. T. Bhashyam, T. Mariappa and H. Siddaiah. In 1944, he completing his schooling before enrolling in a college in Shimoga to pursue the intermediate course.

== Career ==
Upon the publication of his biography, N. Dharam Singh, chief minister of Karnataka, said that "the agitation and the political contribution of the late Shantaveri Gopala Gowda are significant in the history of the Legislature".

Gowda's career centered on agrarian reform and the promotion of the Kannada language. His political influence was characterized by a strong connection to the rural farming community and close associations with the regional intelligentsia. He is primarily recognized for leading the Kagodu Satyagraha, a protest movement involving an indefinite fast intended to secure land rights and economic protections for farmers in Karnataka. This movement increased the visibility of agrarian issues at a national level.Following his death, the socialist movement in Karnataka experienced a gradual decline. M.D. Nanjundaswamy, the leader of the Karnataka Rajya Raitha Sangha, is cited as a key figure who continued the political and agrarian strategies initiated by Gowda.

Throughout his life, Gowda maintained relationships with prominent figures in Kannada literary and intellectual circles, including Gopalakrishna Adiga, Dr. U.R. Ananthamurthy, P. Lankesh, M.D. Nanjundaswamy, etc.

== Personal life ==
Gowda married Sonakka, the daughter of a Hubli-based lawyer, on 3 March 1964. Sonakka (died 2019) worked as a schoolteacher. The couple had two children together: daughter Ila Geetha (b. 1967) and son Ramamanohar (b. 1968). Gowda named his son after Ram Manohar Lohia. Gowda's health began deteriorating after 1970 leading to his death on 9 June 1972 at the Victoria Hospital in Bangalore.

His life served as the basis for the novel Avasthe ("State of Life"), written by Dr. U.R. Ananthamurthy. In 1987, the novel was adapted into a film of the same title, featuring actor Anant Nag in the lead role, which depicted the trajectory of Gowda’s political and personal life.
