= Hanumanthaiah ministry =

Government of Mysore, India (1952–56)

- 2nd Council of Ministers of Mysore
- 1952–1956
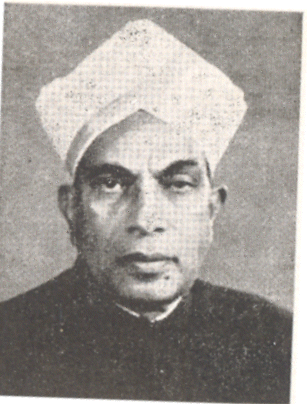
- Kengal Hanumanthaiah
- Date formed: 30 March 1952
- Date dissolved: 19 August 1956

People and organisations
- Rajpramukh: Jayachamarajendra Wadiyar; 26 January 1950 – 1 November 1956 (As Rajpramukh of Mysore)
- Chief Minister: Kengal Hanumanthaiah
- Member parties: Indian National Congress
- Status in legislature: Majority

History
- Election: 1952
- Outgoing election: 1957 (After First Nijalingappa ministry)
- Legislature term: 1952–1957
- Predecessor: K. C. Reddy ministry
- Successor: Manjappa ministry

Kengal Hanumanthaiah Ministry was the Council of Ministers in Mysore, a state in South India headed by Kengal Hanumanthaiah of the Indian National Congress.

The ministry had multiple ministers including the Chief Minister of Mysore. All ministers belonged to the Indian National Congress.

Kengal Hanumanthaiah became Chief Minister of Mysore after Indian National Congress emerged victorious 1952 Mysore elections.

== Chief Minister & Cabinet Ministers ==
S.No	Portfolio	Name	Portrait	Constituency	Term of Office		Party
1	Chief Minister *Other departments not allocated to any Minister.	Kengal Hanumanthaiah		Ramanagara	30 March 1952	19 August 1956	Indian National Congress
2	Revenue; Public Works Department	Kadidal Manjappa		Tirthahalli Koppa	30 March 1952	19 August 1956	Indian National Congress
3	Law; Education	A. G. Ramachandra Rao		Holenarsipur	30 March 1952	19 August 1956	Indian National Congress
4	Health; Public Affairs	T. Channaiah		Mulbagal Srinivasapur	30 March 1952	19 August 1956	Indian National Congress
5	Municipal Governance; Information and Broadcasting	H. Siddaveerappa		Harihar	30 March 1952	19 August 1956	Indian National Congress
6	Agriculture	Dr. R. Nagana Gowda		Hospet	30 March 1952	19 August 1956	Indian National Congress
7	Industries	H. M. Channabasappa		Periyapatna	2 July 1954	17 April 1956	Indian National Congress
7	Industries	H. M. Channabasappa		Periyapatna	26 May 1956	19 August 1956	Indian National Congress
8		T. Siddalingaya		Doddaballapur	30 March 1952	1953	Indian National Congress

== See also ==
- Mysore Legislative Assembly
- Mysore Legislative Council
- Politics of Mysore
