= Mariappa =

Mariappa may refer to:

- Adrian Mariappa (born 1986), English-born Jamaican professional footballer who plays as a defender
- Mariappa Kempaiah (1932–2008), Indian footballer
- Mariappa Nagar, a place in Chidambaram, Cuddalore in India with pin code 608002
- Mariyappa First Grade College, a college in Basaveshwaranagar, Bangalore, India
- T. Mariappa, finance minister of Mysore State, India
