= Agalabagilu =

- village
- Interactive map of Agalabagilu
- Coordinates: 13.7644°N 75.1993°E
- Country: India
- State: Karnataka
- District: Shimoga
- Talukas: Tirthahalli

Government
  - Body: Village Panchayat

Languages
  - Official: Kannada
- Time zone: UTC+5:30 (IST)
- Nearest city: Shimoga
- Civic agency: Village Panchayat

Agalabagilu is a village in the southern state of Karnataka, India. It is located in the Tirthahalli taluk of Shimoga district in Karnataka.

== See also ==
- Shimoga
- Mangalore
- Districts of Karnataka
