= Hanumanthaiah =

Hanumanthaiah is a name. People with the name include:

- Kengal Hanumanthaiah (1908–1980), Indian politician, Chief Minister of Mysore State 1952–1956
  - Hanumanthaiah ministry 1952–1956
- L. Hanumanthaiah (born 1958), Indian politician and poet
