= Aralasurali =

Village in Karnataka, India

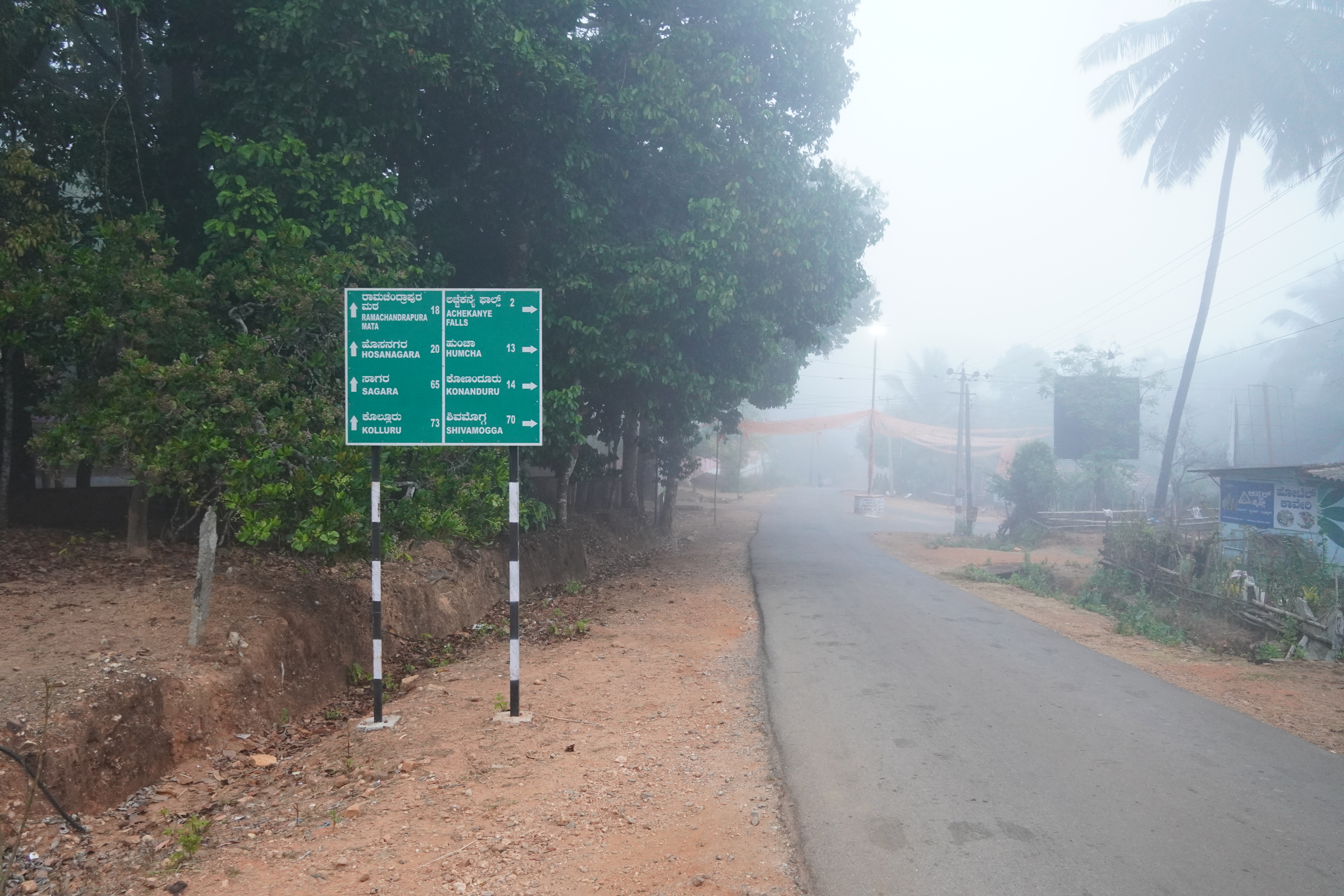
Road To Bandhya

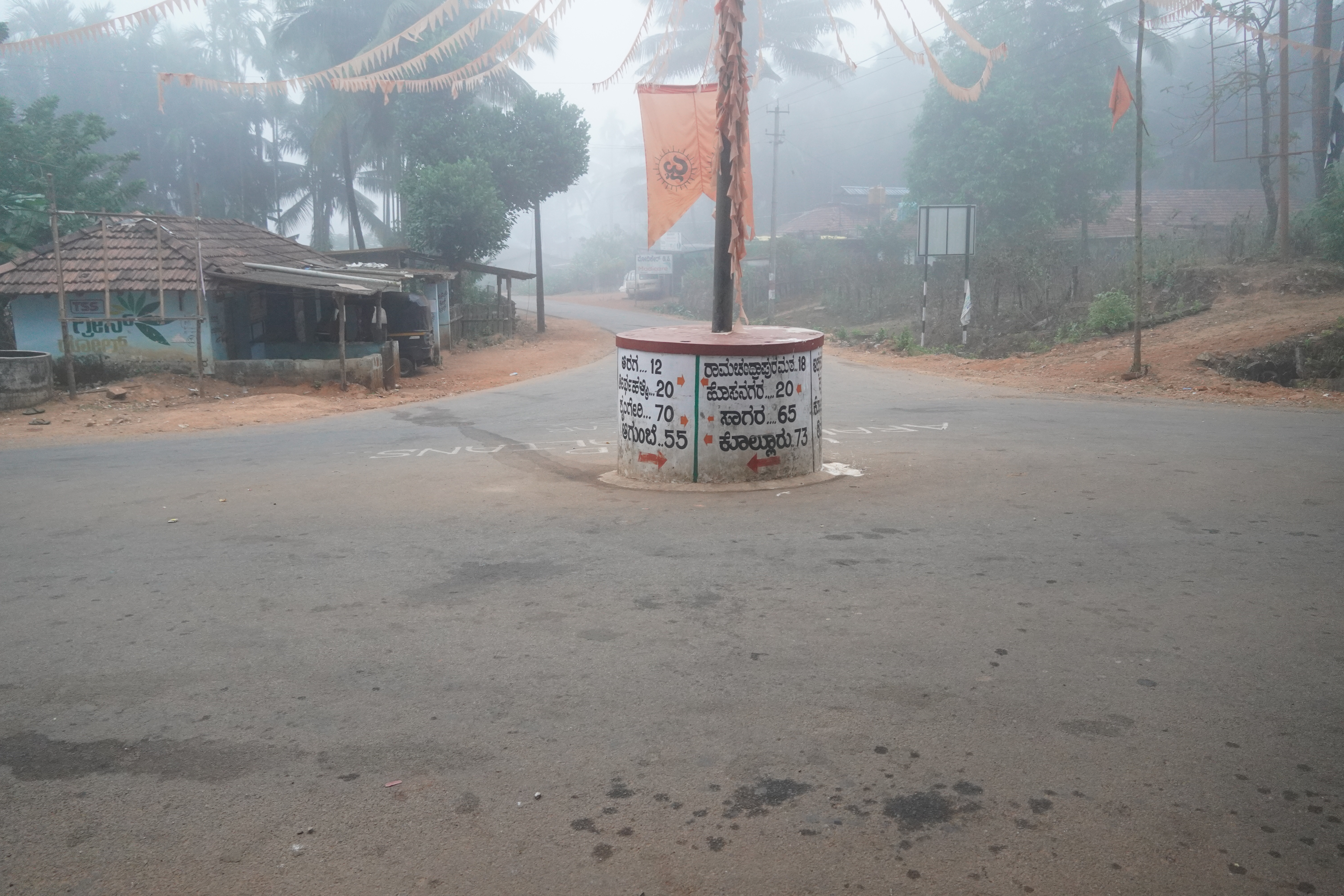
Circle near Aralasurali Subramanya Swamy Temple

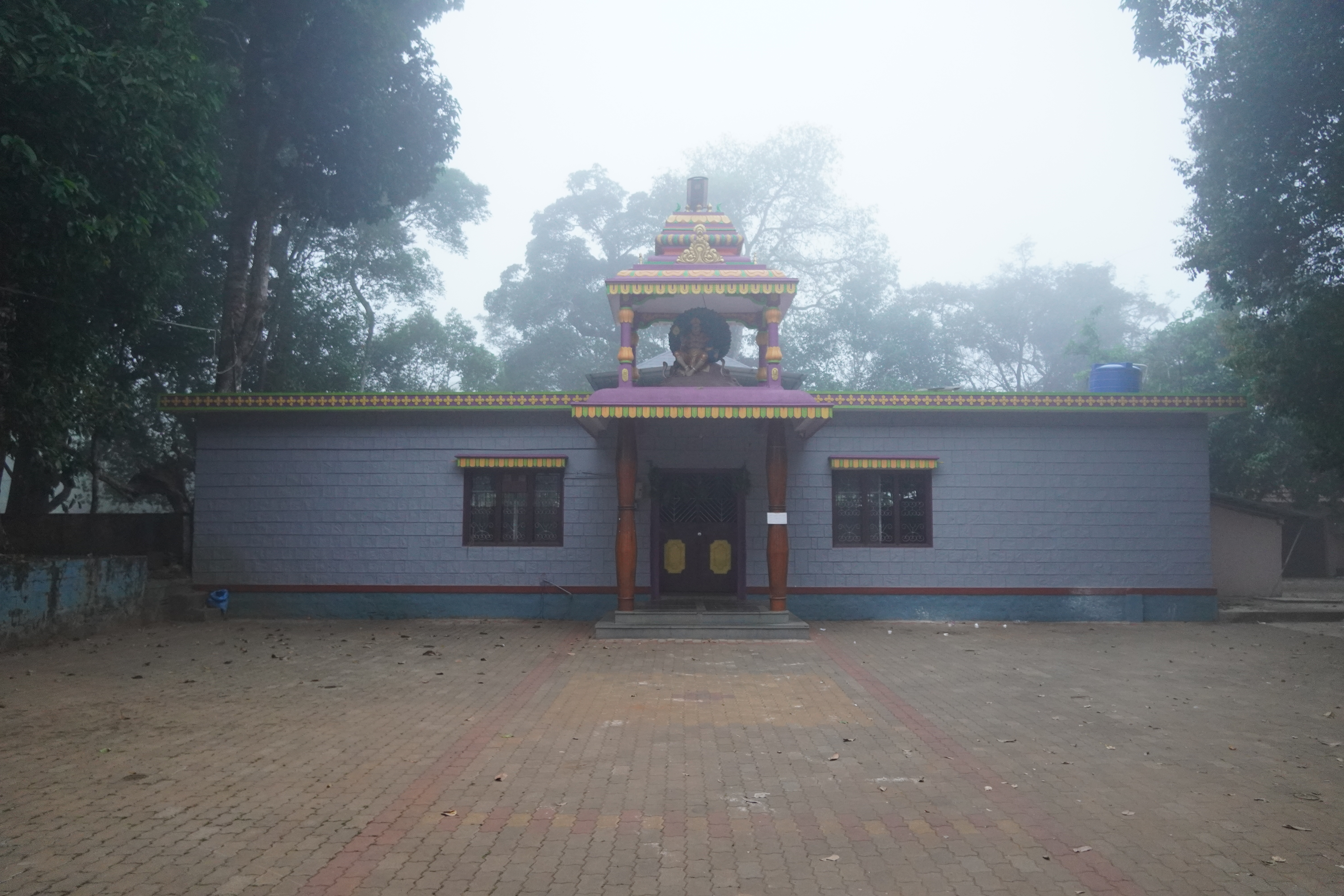
Main landmark of the village

Aralasurali is a village located in the Tirthahalli taluk of Shimoga district, Karnataka, India. It belongs to Bangalore Division. It is located 53 km towards west from District headquarters Shivamogga. 15 km from Tirthahalli. 325 km from state capital Bangalore
