= Aklapura =

- village
- Aklapura is in Shimoga district
- Country: India
- State: Karnataka
- District: Shimoga
- Talukas: Tirthahalli

Government
  - Body: Village Panchayat

Languages
  - Official: Kannada
- Time zone: UTC+5:30 (IST)
- Nearest city: Shimoga
- Civic agency: Village Panchayat

Aklapura is a village in the southern state of Karnataka, India. It is located in the Tirthahalli taluk of Shimoga district in Karnataka.

== See also ==
- Shimoga
- Mangalore
- Districts of Karnataka
