= N. Chaluvaraya Swamy =

Indian politician

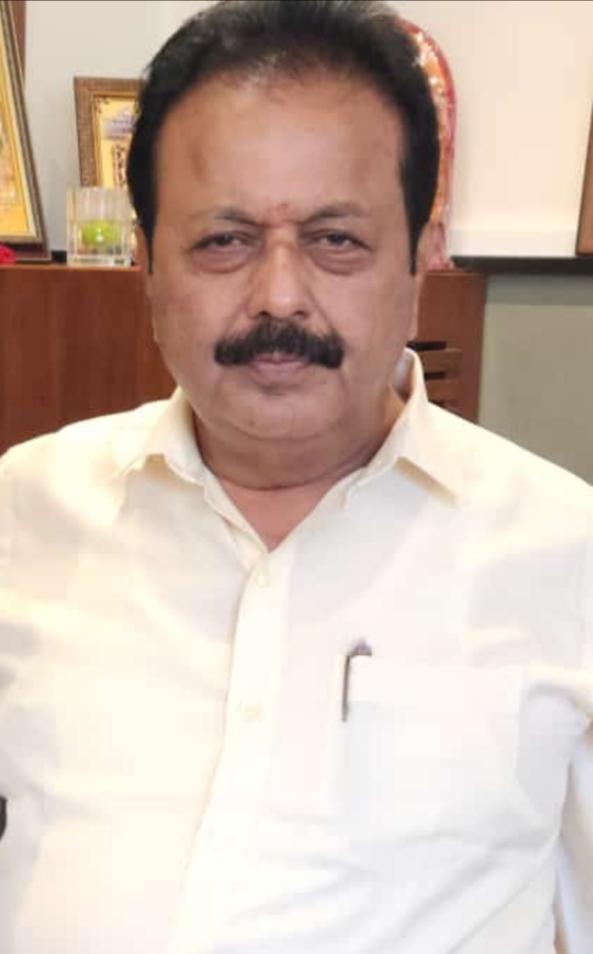
- Swamy in 2024

Cabinet Minister, Government of Karnataka
- Incumbent
- Assumed office 03 August 2026
- Governor: Thawarchand Gehlot
- Chief Minister: D. K. Shivakumar
- Ministry and Departments: Major and Medium Irrigation

Cabinet Minister, Government of Karnataka
- In office 27 May 2023 – 03 June 2026
- Chief Minister: Siddaramaiah
- Ministry and Departments: Agriculture

Member of Karnataka Legislative Assembly
- Incumbent
- Assumed office 13 May 2023
- Preceded by: Suresh Gowda
- Constituency: Nagamangala
- In office 2013–2018
- Preceded by: Suresh Gowda
- Succeeded by: Suresh Gowda
- Constituency: Nagamangala
- In office 1999–2008
- Preceded by: L. R. Shivarame Gowda
- Succeeded by: Suresh Gowda
- Constituency: Nagamangala

Member of Parliament, Lok Sabha
- In office 2009–2013
- Preceded by: Ambareesh
- Succeeded by: Ramya
- Constituency: Mandya

Personal details
- Born: 1 June 1960 (age 66) Ijjala Ghatta, Nagamangala Taluk, Mandya district, Karnataka
- Party: Indian National Congress
- Spouse: Dhanalakshmi B. K.
- Children: 2

N. Chaluvaraya Swamy is an Indian politician from Karnataka. He is a member of the Indian National Congress and a member of the Karnataka Legislative Assembly representing Nagamangala. He has served as a Cabinet Minister in the Government of Karnataka and currently holds the portfolio of Major and Medium Irrigation.

== Early life and education ==
N. Chaluvaraya Swamy was born on 1 June 1960 to Narasimhegowda and Sakamma in Ijjala-Ghatta, Mandya district, Karnataka. He comes from an agricultural family in Nagamangala taluk. He is married to B. K. Dhanalakshmi and has two sons. He holds a diploma in Civil Engineering.

== Political career ==
=== Local government and Karnataka Legislative Assembly ===
Chaluvaraya Swamy was a member of the Zilla panchayat from 1994 to 1999 and served as its vice-president from 1996 to 1997. He was elected to the Karnataka Legislative Assembly from Nagamangala in 1999 and was re-elected in 2004. He subsequently served as a minister in the Government of Karnataka, including as Minister for Health and later as Minister for Transport.

=== Member of Parliament ===
In the 2009 Indian general election, Chaluvaraya Swamy was elected to the Lok Sabha from the Mandya constituency as a candidate of the Janata Dal (Secular). He was a member of the 15th Lok Sabha from 2009 to 2013.

During his parliamentary tenure, he participated in parliamentary debates and raised questions on a range of subjects. PRS Legislative Research records 835 questions and 18 debates during his tenure in the 15th Lok Sabha.

=== Return to Karnataka politics ===
In 2013, Chaluvaraya Swamy returned to the Karnataka Legislative Assembly and was elected from Nagamangala as a Janata Dal (Secular) candidate. In the 2018 Karnataka Legislative Assembly election, he contested from Nagamangala on an Indian National Congress ticket but was defeated by Suresh Gowda of the Janata Dal (Secular).

He was elected again from Nagamangala in the 2023 Karnataka Legislative Assembly election as a candidate of the Indian National Congress.

=== Minister of Agriculture ===
Following the formation of the Second Siddaramaiah ministry in May 2023, Chaluvaraya Swamy was appointed Minister for Agriculture in the Government of Karnataka.

During his tenure as Agriculture Minister, he was associated with programmes and initiatives concerning farmers, agricultural development, agricultural trade and related departmental activities.

=== Minister of Water Resources ===
In 2026, Chaluvaraya Swamy was assigned the Water Resources (Major and Medium Irrigation) portfolio in the Government of Karnataka.

As Water Resources Minister, his portfolio includes major and medium irrigation projects and matters concerning Karnataka's water resources. He has also represented the state's position on inter-state water matters, including the Cauvery water dispute.

== Electoral performance ==
Electoral performance

1999 Karnataka Assembly election – Nagamangala – Janata Dal (Secular) – Won

2004 Karnataka Assembly election – Nagamangala – Janata Dal (Secular) – Won

2009 Indian general election – Mandya – Janata Dal (Secular) – Won

2013 Karnataka Assembly election – Nagamangala – Janata Dal (Secular) – Won

2018 Karnataka Assembly election – Nagamangala – Indian National Congress – Lost

2023 Karnataka Assembly election – Nagamangala – Indian National Congress – Won
