= L. R. Shivarame Gowda =

Indian politician

Member of Parliament, Lok Sabha
- In office 6 November 2018 – 23 May 2019
- Preceded by: C. S. Puttaraju, JD(S)
- Succeeded by: Sumalatha
- Constituency: Mandya

Member of Karnataka Legislative Assembly
- In office 1989–1999
- Preceded by: H. T. Krishnappa
- Succeeded by: N. Chaluvaraya Swamy
- Constituency: Nagamangala

Personal details
- Party: Indian National Congress

L. R. Shivarame Gowda (born 1 June 1956), is an Indian politician and the chairman of Karnataka Federation Independent Schools Management. On 6 November 2018, he was elected as Member of Parliament from the Mandya parliamentary constituency. In April 2023, he had joined Bharatiya Janata Party. However, on 16th Feb 2025, he rejoined the Indian National Congress again.

== Personal life ==
Shivarame Gowda was born to Patel L. Ramegowda & Lakshmamma in Lalanakere, Nagamangala Mandya District. Shivarame Gowda was married to Sudha S. Gowda & has a son and a daughter.

== Political career ==
In 1978, he entered into politics by becoming a member of TAPS. In 1984, he contested as an independent candidate from Nagamangala Constituency. He also served as the Chairman of Karnataka State Coir Development Corporation.

=== Positions held ===
From 1980 to 1983, he served as the Treasurer of the Karnataka Congress Youth Unit. Between 1983 and 1987, he held the position of Secretary and subsequently became the chief of the Karnataka Congress Youth Wing. In 1987, he was elected as a member of the Zilla Panchayat representing the Bindiganavile Constituency.

In 1989, he contested as an independent candidate from the Nagamangala Constituency and was elected as a Member of the Legislative Assembly. He secured a second term as an independent candidate from the same constituency in the 1994 elections.

In 2000, he participated in the assembly elections from the Nagamangala Constituency. Between 2000 and 2004, he served as the President of the Mandya District Congress.
