= K. T. Bhashyam =

Indian politician

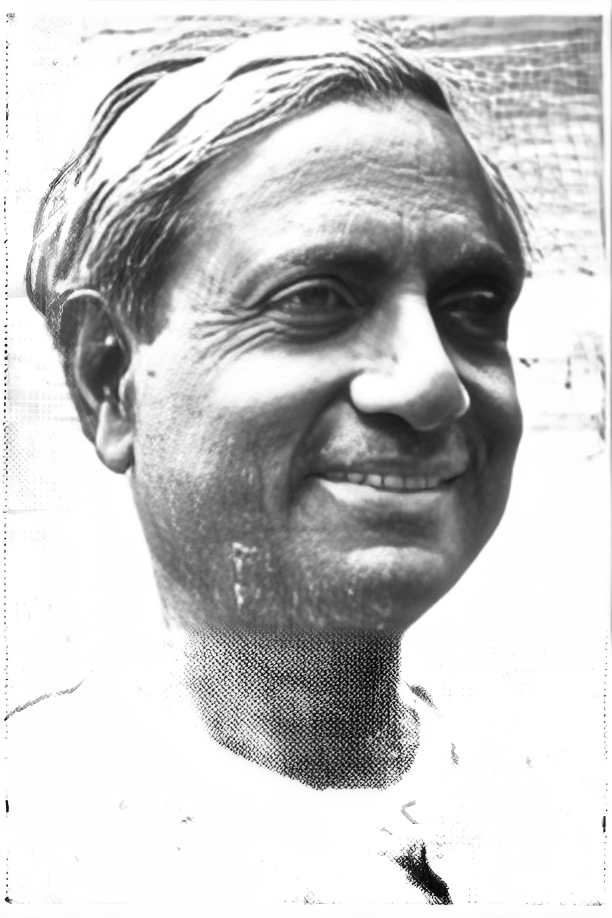

Chairman of Mysore Legislative Council
- In office 17 June 1952 – 24 May 1956
- Succeeded by: T. Subramanya

Minister of Labour, Government of Mysore
- In office 1947 - 1952
- Chief Minister: K. Chengalaraya Reddy
- Constituency: Legislation not established

Minister of Law, Government of Mysore
- In office 1947–1952
- Chief Minister: K. Chengalaraya Reddy
- Constituency: Legislation not established

Member of Mysore Legislative Council
- In office 1952 – 24 May 1956
- Succeeded by: H. C. Boraiah

Personal details
- Born: 12 April 1895 Bangalore, Kingdom of Mysore, British India
- Died: 24 May 1956 (aged 61) Bangalore, Mysore state, India
- Party: Indian National Congress(1947-1956)
- Other political affiliations: Mysore Congress (1938-1947); Prajasamyuktha (Till 1938)
- Spouse: Kalyani
- Education: Bachelor of Arts, Bachelor of Law
- Alma mater: Madras University
- Occupation: Politician
- Profession: Lawyer, Political and Social Worker

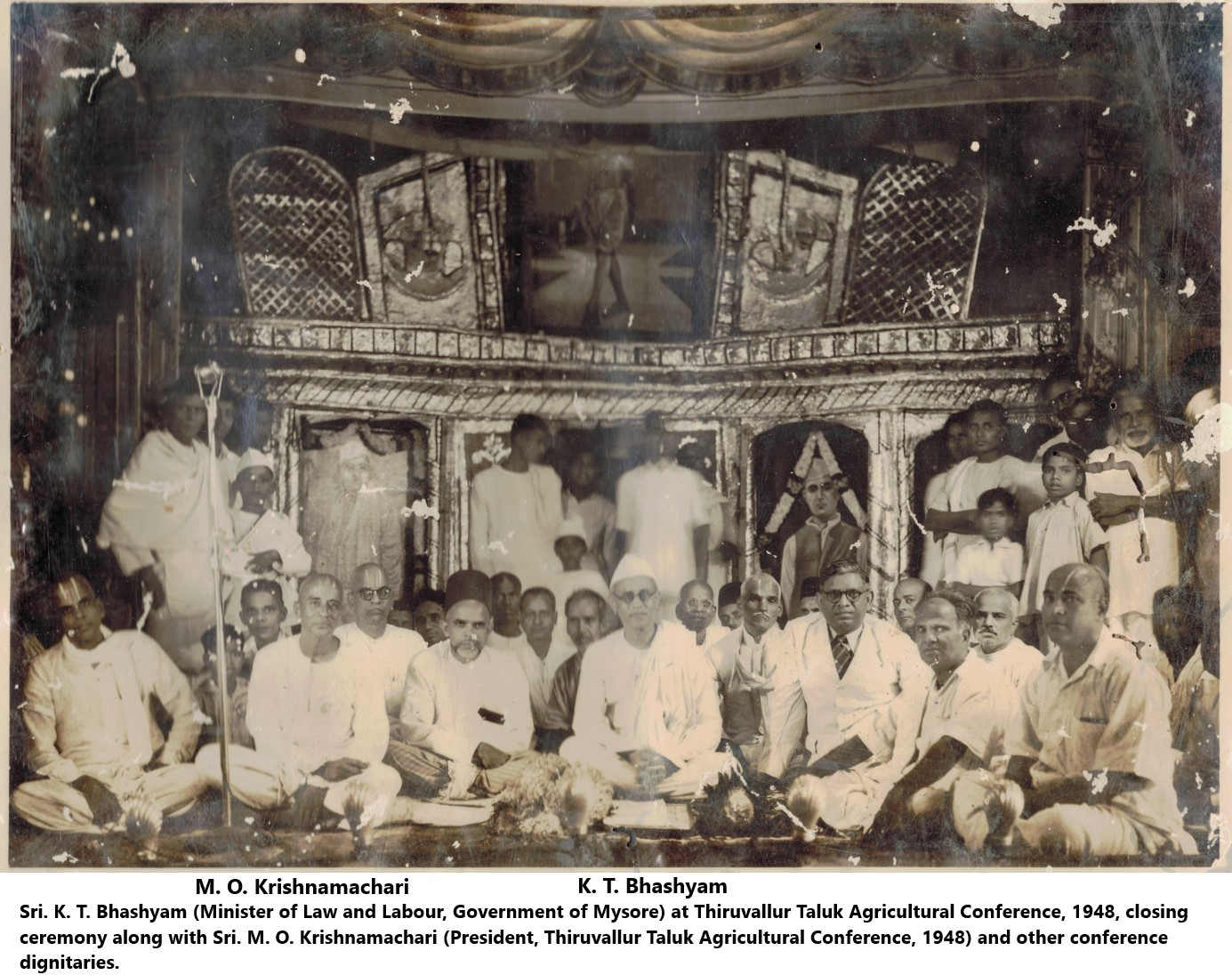
Sri. K. T. Bhashyam (Minister of Law and Labour, Government of Mysore) at Thiruvallur Taluk Agricultural Conference, 1948 closing ceremony along with Sri. M. O. Krishnamachari (President, Thiruvallur Taluk Agricultural Conference, 1948) and other conference dignitaries.

K. Thuppul Narasimha Iyengar Bhashyam (12 April 1895 - 24 May 1956) was an Indian politician from the state of Mysore.

== Personal life ==
Bhashyam was born 12 April 1885 to Narasimha Iyengar and his mother died within a week after his birth from post-delivery complications. His father was an advocate and Bhashyam was his only child. He spent his childhood and lower primary schooling in Madras, which was the hometown of his mother and was interested more in Sports during schooling. His father brought him back to Bangalore for Higher Primary education and later joined Central College, which was still affiliated to Madras University (Mysore University was yet to be started) to pursue BA. Later he studied BL at Madras Law College and returned back to Bangalore in 1919 and started practising Law. He became an Advocate at Mysore High Court thereafter under the mentorship of senior Lawyers Mokshagundam Ramachandrarao and Somashekar. P. V. Rangaswamy Iyengar (Perangutur Vankipuram Rangaswamy Iyengar) was then Salt Commissioner, was popular among common men since he was responding in addressing their problems. He was fond of the oratory skills of Bhashyam and later became the father-in-law of Bhashyam when his only daughter Kalyani married Bhashyam since both families were from the same community. He was from the same lineage of popular figures like Jayalalithaa (Former Chief Minister of Tamil Nadu) and famous lawyer LS Raju who made a significant contribution to the history of Mysore State.

== Involvement in Independence struggle ==
Bhashyam was involved in Indian independence movement when he was a barrister at Mysore High Court and was well recognized in White formals with a white Cap and wearing a white shawl on the shoulder. He participated in a Hunger strike in 1921 and became a member of Indian National Congress in 1922. He was a member of Mysore Representative Assembly from 1926 to 1939 and was a popular figure among Mysore Congress members. He wrote the book Hindu Kanooninalli Mahileyaru (Role of women in Hindu Law) in 1928 and was recognized as a leader who highlights the problems faced by women at that time. He established the Cotton weavers association in 1929 to highlight the problems of such labourers. He was also the President of Youth Congregation at Majestic Theatre in Bangalore.

== Political life ==
Bhashyam became a Councillor of Bangalore Town Municipal Council in 1930 and established a Gym for freedom fighters to maintain their fitness and was arrested for 3 months. The reason being he was accused of mobilizing freedom fighters. He was a member of Mysore Legislative Council from 1934 to 1938. He united two Political parties Prajapaksha and Prajamitra and floated the merged party Prajasamyuktha and was arrested accusing Anti-king of activities, but later released unconditionally. Prajasamyuktha was merged with Mysore Congress and grabbed more than sixty thousand people and became members across the Kingdom of Mysore in 1938. He was instrumental in stitching ties between Kingdom of Mysore and freedom fighters post Vidurashwatha massacre. He was stopped from giving a speech at Shivapura near Maddur during the Shivapura movement in 1938. His membership to the Bar council was terminated in 1940 and he could not continue practising Law thereafter. He was the President of the Mysore Congress during 1940-41. He became president of the Binny Mill Employees Association in 1941. He was also arrested during Quit India Movement in 1942. He became the President of the Labourers association in 1944. He gave a popular speech in the Kochi people association in Irinjalakuda, Kingdom of Cochin on 28 October 1945. On 15 August 1947 when the nation was celebrating, the Diwan of Mysore, who happens to be the Minister in the Maharaja's court, Arcot Ramasamy Mudaliar, accompanied by Thambu Chetty had suggested Jayachamarajendra Wadiyar, the Maharaja of Mysore to delay the Instrument of Accession to join the new dominion of India. This created anger among people, who were for the Kingdom of Mysore joining the Dominion of India. Like-minded people led by the figureheads like K. Chengalaraya Reddy, Kengal Hanumanthaiah, V. Venkatappa, Subrahmanyam along with Bhashyam and others initiated a movement by the name Mysore Chalo and marched to protest against the decision taken by the Mysuru Palace. Mysore Chalo movement is still remembered and observed on October 24 every year. Post Independence, he became Law and Labor minister in K. C. Reddy ministry of Mysore State and was instrumental in addressing problems faced by Labourers. It was during this term, the Labourers were allowed to take Weekly Off. He participated in an International congregation for the welfare of Labourers (1948 in San Francisco, California and 1949 in Geneva, Switzerland). Yuvaraja Sri Sir Kanteerava Narasimharaja Wodeyar laid the stone for Sahakara Bhavan in Mysore on 22 March 1933 and Bhashyam named it after the Yuvaraja when he was The Law and Labour Minister of Mysore State on 7 October 1951) He became the member of Mysore Legislative Council in 1952 and also the Chairman of the same house very soon. His rulings as a Chairman is marked as a reference since he maintain the neutrality between ruling and opposition, to act as a constructive link between the systems, which was a much needed quality for a Patriarch of the House. Following the Assassination of Mahatma Gandhi, Saganappa and many youths who had joined Indian independence movement participated in the freedom movement and followed by Gandhi's principles built a Temple in honor of Gandhiji located opposite to Anjaneyaswamy Temple at Nidaghatta in Kadur Taluk, Chikmagalur district. It was inaugurated by the Bhashyam on February 22, 1948, who was Then Law and Labour Minister of Mysore State He also inaugurated Lakshmi Theatre in Mysore when he was a minister.

== Death ==
On 24 May 1956, he suffered a massive Heart attack soon after he entered his house, returning from a function and died on spot. His mortal remains were seen by a huge crowd. He was cremated with full state honour following a procession across Bangalore city.

== Places in honor ==
- Bhashyam Circle, Sadashivanagar, Bangalore
- Bhashyam Circle, Rajajinagar, Bangalore
- Bhashyam Park, opposite to Mantri Square, Sampige Road, Malleshwaram / Seshadripuram, Bangalore
