= Araga Jnanendra =

Indian politician

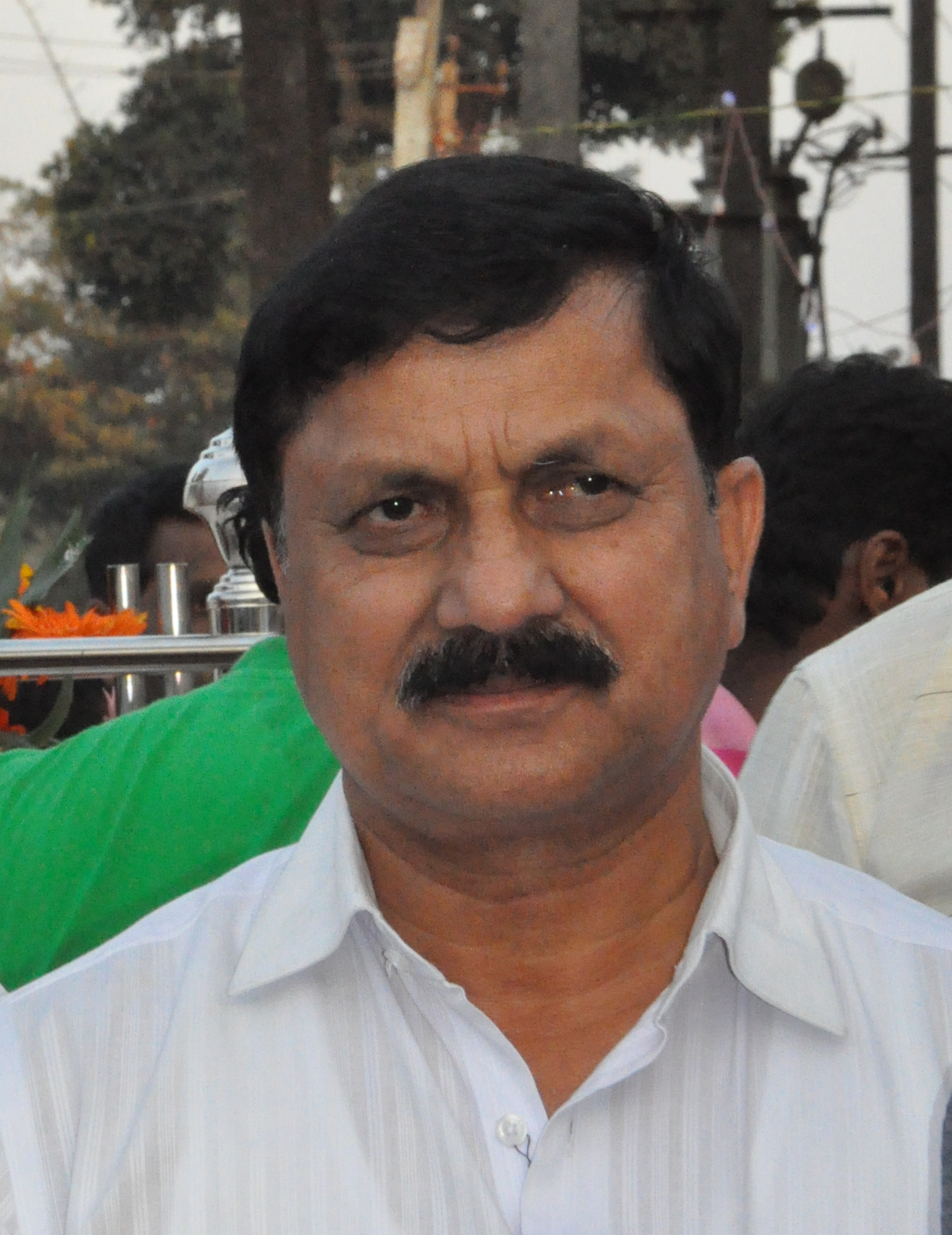

Minister of Home Affairs Government of Karnataka
- In office 4 August 2021 – 13 May 2023
- Governor: Thawar Chand Gehlot
- Chief Minister: Basavaraj Bommai
- Preceded by: Basavaraj Bommai
- Succeeded by: G. Parameshwara

Chairman of Karnataka Housing Board
- In office 28 July 2020 – 28 July 2021
- Chief Minister: B. S. Yediyurappa

Chairman of Mysore Paper Mills
- In office 4 June 2008 – June 2012
- Chief Minister: B. S. Yediyurappa; Sadananda Gowda

Member of Karnataka Legislative Assembly
- Incumbent
- Assumed office 2018
- Preceded by: Kimmane Rathnakar
- Constituency: Tirthahalli
- In office 1994–2008
- Preceded by: D B Chandregowda
- Succeeded by: Kimmane Rathnakar
- Constituency: Tirthahalli

Personal details
- Born: Araga Dnyanendra; 15 March 1953 (age 73) Araga, Mysore State, India
- Party: Bharatiya Janata Party
- Spouse: Prafulla
- Children: 2
- Education: Kuvempu University
- Profession: Political

Araga Jnanendra is an Indian politician who previously served as the Minister of Home Department Excluding Intelligence Wing of Karnataka from 4 August 2021 to 13 May 2023. He is the Member of the Karnataka Legislative assembly from Thirthahalli constituency.

== Early life and education ==
Araga Jnanendra Kumar was born in 1953 in Hisana, Araga village, located in the Thirthahalli taluk. He received his primary education in the village. He went on to complete his B.Com. degree at State College in Shimoga.

== Political career ==
He is a member of Rashtriya Swayamsevak Sangh, and began his career in electoral politics in 1983.

In 1983 and 1985 he contested and lost Member of Legislative assembly (MLA) elections.

In 1986 he won Jilla Parishatha election and worked as President of Krushi Sthayi Samithi. In 1989 he lost the MLA elections for the third time. He finally won the Member of Legislative assembly (MLA) election for the first time in 1994.

Beginning in 1991 he worked in Shimoga Co-operative Milk Dairy.

He was reelected in the MLA election in 1999 and 2004 but in 2009 he lost the MLA election.

In 2009 he was selected Chairman of Mysore Paper Mills, Badravathi.

In 2013 he lost the MLA election.

In 2018 he won the Assembly election by a margin of 22000 votes.

In 2021 he was sworn in as cabinet minister in Govt. of Karnataka.
