= Kimmane Rathnakar =

Indian politician

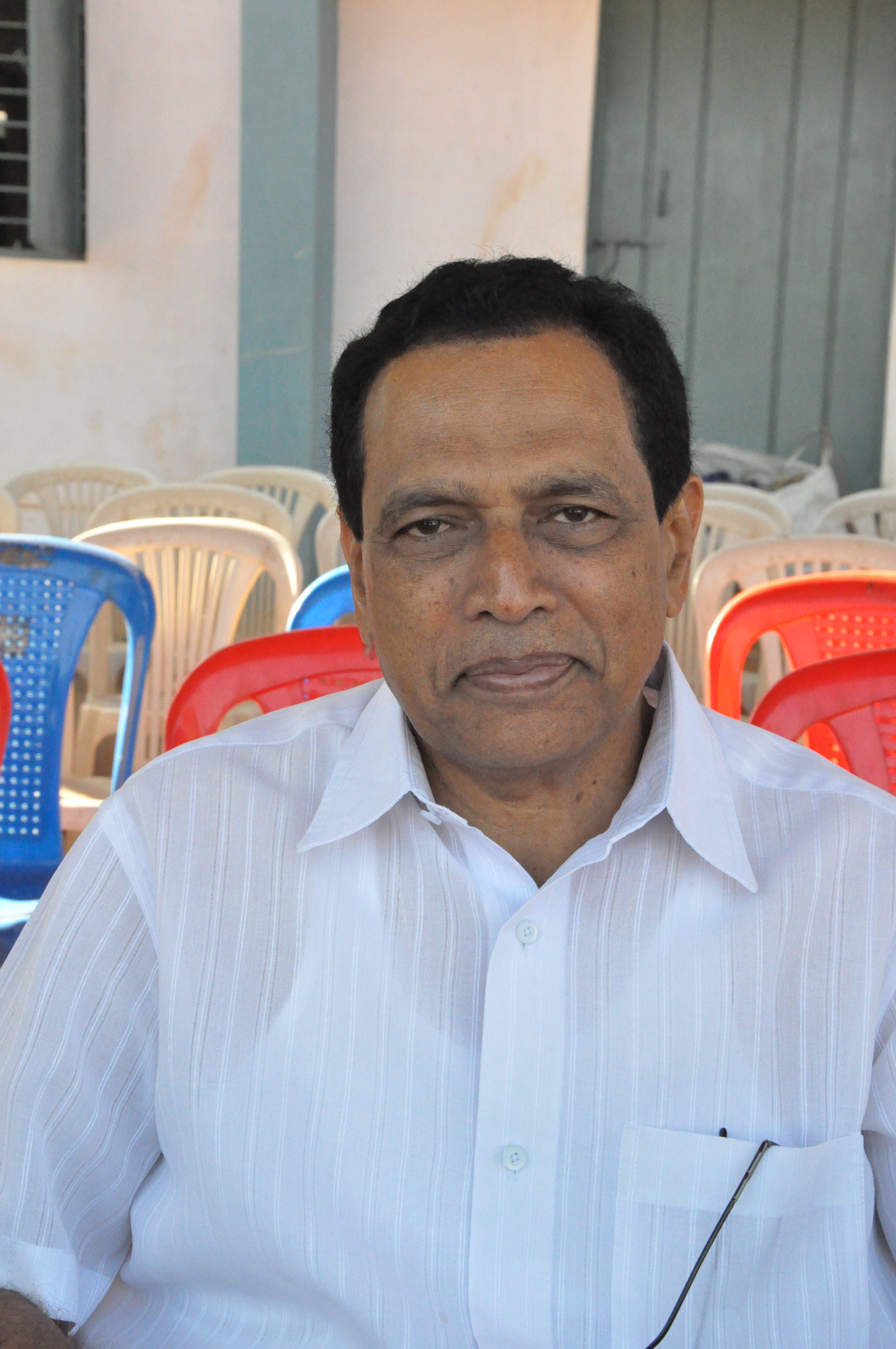

Minister of Primary and Secondary education & Sakala of Karnataka
- In office 2013–2016
- Preceded by: Vishweshwar Hegde Kageri
- Succeeded by: Tanveer Sait

Member of Legislative Assembly (Thirthahalli)
- In office 4 June 2008 – 16 May 2018
- Preceded by: Araga Jnanendra
- Succeeded by: Araga Jnanendra
- Constituency: Thirthahalli, Shimoga

Personal details
- Born: Kimmane Rathnakar; 17 July 1951 (age 74)
- Party: Indian National Congress
- Profession: Advocate, Politician

Kimmane Rathnakar is an Indian professional advocate and politician who served as the Minister of Primary and Secondary Education & Sakala of Karnataka from 2013 to 2016. He was a Member of the Karnataka Legislative Assembly from Thirthahalli constituency from 4 June 2008 to 16 May 2018 in Shimoga District. He belongs to the Indian National Congress.

== Early life and education ==
Rathnakar completed his schooling in Thirthahalli, and then he completed a Bachelor of Science degree at Bhuvanendra College, Karkala. In 1966, he completed his law degree at BMS College of Law.

== Political career ==
He was the minister for Primary and Secondary education, Government of Karnataka till 18 June 2016. In 2013, `Rathnakar (Indian National Congress) beat RM Manjunatha Gowda (KJP) by 1343 votes to become member of the assembly for the second consecutive time. But, in 2018, he lost to Araga Jnanendra (BJP) by 21,679 votes.

== Act of bravery ==
On 17 September 2013, Rathnakar's staff saved a family of 6 from drowning into Beguvalli Lake near Shimoga. He was coming back to Bangalore from his hometown Thirthahalli, when he spotted a car sinking with its occupants crying for help. The Minister's bodyguard and driver jumped into the lake and saved the family. He also arranged for their medical treatment and shared his clothes with them.
