= T. Siddalingayya =

Indian politician

Member of the Rajya Sabha
- In office 3 May 1967 – 2 April 1970
- Preceded by: C. M. Poonacha

Member of Mysore Legislative Assembly
- In office 1952–1962
- Preceded by: Constituency established
- Succeeded by: G. Rame Gowda
- Constituency: Doddaballapur

Minister of Industries and Commerce, Government of Mysore
- In office 1952–1953

Minister for Education and Health, Government of Mysore
- In office 6 February 1950 – December 1950

Member of Constituent Assembly of India
- In office 1946–1950

Personal details
- Born: 3 September 1896 Doddaballapura, Kingdom of Mysore
- Died: 23 July 1984 (aged 87) Bangalore, Karnataka, India
- Party: Indian National Congress
- Spouse: Parvatamma (died 1938)
- Children: 3
- Profession: Lawyer; Politician

Totappa Siddalingayya (3 September 1896 – 23 July 1984) was a lawyer and politician from Indian State of Mysore (now Karnataka). He served as a member of the Constituent Assembly of India and later of the Rajya Sabha, the Upper House of the Indian Parliament. After practicing as a lawyer briefly, he joined the Indian National Congress in 1936, and served as cabinet minister in post-independence India, in his home State of Mysore.

== Early life ==
Siddalingaya was born on 3 September 1896 in Doddaballapura to Siddamma and Totappa as the third of their nine children. Upon completing schooling in Bangalore, he obtained a bachelor of arts degree from Maharaja's College in Mysore. His classmates included future civil servant S. K. Venkataranga and poet V. Seetharamaiah. Siddalingayya chose philosophy as his optional subject and studied under the guidance of Sarvepalli Radhakrishnan. He completed his post-graduate studies in law in Madras and Travancore, before practicing as a lawyer with a senior lawyer Mokshagundam Krishnamurthy in Bangalore. After three years, he returned to Doddaballapura and began to practice law independently.

== Career ==
In 1932, Siddalingayya joined the Theosophical Lodge in Bangalore, and came in contact with progressive thinkers of the time such as B. M. Srikantaiah, S. V. Ranganna and P. Kodandaramaiah. Inspired by this and a growing interest in public affairs led to his joining the Indian National Congress. In 1936, under his leadership, a Doddaballapura unit of the Congress was established. Contesting with a Congress ticket, he won the year's municipal elections from the city.

After independence, Siddalingayya was appointed the Minister of Education and Health in the government of Mysore. He assumed the position in February 1950 before resigning ten months later. He contested the first general elections to the Mysore Legislative Assembly in 1952 from the Doddaballapur Assembly constituency and won with the highest percentage of votes polled. Siddalingayya was appointed the Minister of Industries and Commerce as part of the Hanumanthaiah ministry. However, differences between members of the Congress led to his resignation the following year. He was reelected in 1957 after he defeated T. C. Gangadharappa of the Jan Sangh. Siddalingayya represented Mysore State in Rajya Sabha between 1967 and 1970. Earlier, he was member of Mysore Legislative Council during 1947–1950, and minister in government of Mysore during 1952–1953, and a member of the Constituent Assembly of India.

Siddalingayya was married to Parvatamma and had three children with her — sons Rajashekharayya and Shanta Kumar and daughter, Sarojamma. Parvatamma died from tuberculosis in 1938, shortly after the Siddalingayya's imprisonment following his participation in the Shivapura Satyagraha.
