= Kadidal Manjappa =

Indian politician

3rd Chief Minister of Mysore State
- In office 19 August 1956 – 31 October 1956
- Governor: Jayachamarajendra Wadiyar
- Preceded by: Kengal Hanumanthaiah
- Succeeded by: S. Nijalingappa

Minister of Revenue, Government of Mysore
- In office 1952–1956
- Chief Minister: Kengal Hanumanthaiah

Member of the Mysore Legislative Assembly
- In office 1952–1957
- Preceded by: Constituency established
- Succeeded by: Constituency abolished
- Constituency: Tirthahalli Koppa

Personal details
- Born: 10 July 1908 Harohalli, Shimoga, Kingdom of Mysore
- Died: 8 March 1992 (aged 83)
- Party: Indian National Congress (1938–1977)
- Other political affiliations: Congress for Democracy (1977)

Kadidal Manjappa (10 July 1908 – 8 March 1992) was an Indian independence activist, politician and writer, who served as the third Chief Minister of Karnataka (then Mysore State) for a short period in 1956.

== Early life ==
Manjappa was born on 10 July 1908 in Harohalli, a village in Shimoga district of the erstwhile Kingdom of Mysore (in present-day Karnataka, India). He was born into a Vokkaliga family of farmers. He was the eldest among eight children of Duggappa Gowda, who died when Manjappa was aged 12, and Gangamma. He completed his graduation from the Maharaja's College, Mysore and obtained his law degree from the Poona Law college. Manjappa practiced as a lawyer starting 1935 in Shimoga.

== Political career ==
In 1938, he became a member of the Indian National Congress when the party established its unit in the Mysore region. He got himself actively involved in the independence movement and participated in the Shivapura satyagraha that took place near Maddur that year, and subsequently the Quit India Movement, which led to his imprisonment. He continued legal practice during this time and was elected unopposed to the judicial council in 1945. Post-independence, he contested the first elections to the Mysore Legislative Assembly in 1952 from Tirthahalli Koppa and won. In the Hanumanthaiah ministry, he was appointed the minister for revenue and public works. In 1956, he was appointed the third Chief Minister of the State and held the position for a total of 74 days. It was during this time that the Vidhana Soudha, which serves as the seat of the state legislature of Karnataka, was inaugurated.

In 1957, he was elected from Sringeri. As part of the Jatti ministry, he was once again handed the revenue portfolio. During his tenure, the Karnataka Land Reforms Act, 1961, was passed. He was reelected from Sringeri in 1962. Disillusioned by the people around him and the politics of the State, Manjappa subsequently announced retirement from electoral politics.

== Later life and final years ==
After a career in politics, Manjappa took to writing, and wrote three novels and an autobiography. In his first novel, Panjaravalliya Panju (The Martyr of Panjaravalli), which was published in 1962, with preface written by D. R. Bendre, Manjappa explores the conflict between human goodness and evil politics through the experiences of a family across three generations. His second novel titled NaaLeya NeraLu was published in 1966 and the final one, Kranti KooTa, in 1975. His autobiography, Nanasaagada Kanasu, was published in 1990. Manjappa suffered from stomach ulcer and died on 8 March 1992.

== Legacy ==
Manjappa was a freedom fighter and a true Gandhian who led many struggles in the state for probity in public life. He served as a minister in various central and state governments for 32 years. He played an important role in initiating land reforms in the early 1950s by introducing laws related to the abolition of absentee landlordism and recognition to the right of cultivators. He is remembered for introducing the Tenancy Act. Several other progressive acts like the Inam abolition act came into being because of vision. He joined protests against emergency excesses in 1976 and later, headed the Karnataka state unit of "Congress for Democracy" floated by Babu Jagjivan Ram.

The former Langford Road in Bengaluru has been renamed as "Kadidal Manjappa Road" in his honor. His centenary celebrations were held in 2008.

== See also ==
- List of chief ministers of Karnataka

Preceded by Kengal Hanumanthaiah	Chief Minister of Karnataka; 19 August 1956 – 31 October 1956	Succeeded by S. Nijalingappa
