= Nagamangala Assembly constituency =

Legislative Assembly constituency in Karnataka, India

Coordinates: 12.83°N 76.76°E

Nagamangala
- Constituency No. 191 for the Karnataka Legislative Assembly

Constituency details
- Country: India
- Region: South India
- State: Karnataka
- District: Mandya
- Lok Sabha constituency: Mandya
- Established: 1951
- Total electors: 214,272 (2023)
- Reservation: None

Member of Legislative Assembly
- 16th Karnataka Legislative Assembly
- Incumbent N. Chaluvaraya Swamy
- Party: Indian National Congress
- Elected year: 2023
- Preceded by: Suresh Gowda

Nagamangala Assembly constituency is one of the 224 constituencies in the Karnataka Legislative Assembly of Karnataka, a southern state of India. It is also part of Mandya Lok Sabha constituency.

== Members of the Legislative Assembly ==
Election	Member	Party
1952	M. Shankaralinge Gowda	Independent politician
1953 By-election (Note: Died in 1953)	K. Singarigowda	Indian National Congress
1957	T. Mariappa	Indian National Congress
1962	T. N. Madappa Gowda	Independent politician
1967	K. Singarigowda	Indian National Congress
1972	T. N. Madappa Gowda	Indian National Congress
1972 By-election (Note: Died on 27/07/1972)	H. T. Krishnappa	Indian National Congress
1978	H. T. Krishnappa	Independent politician
1983	Chigarigowda	Independent politician
1984 By-election (Note: Died on 21/06/1984)	H. T. Krishnappa	Independent politician
1985	H. T. Krishnappa	Janata Party
1989	L. R. Shivarame Gowda	Independent politician
1994	L. R. Shivarame Gowda	Independent politician
1999	N. Chaluvaraya Swamy	Janata Dal
2004	N. Chaluvaraya Swamy	Janata Dal
2008	Suresh Gowda	Indian National Congress
2013	N. Chaluvaraya Swamy	Janata Dal
2018	Suresh Gowda	Janata Dal
2023	N. Chaluvaraya Swamy	Indian National Congress

== Election results ==
=== Assembly Election 2023 ===
2023 Karnataka Legislative Assembly election : Nagamangala
Party	Candidate	Votes	%	±%
INC	N. Chaluvaraya Swamy	90,634	47.17%	▲11.50
JD(S)	Suresh Gowda	86,220	50%	▼17.07
BJP	Sudha Shivaramegowda	7,769	4.04%	▲2.98
Independent	B. M. Mallikarjun (Fighter Ravi)	3,293	1.71%	New
NOTA	None of the above	577	0.30%	▼0.06
Margin of victory		4,414	2.30%	▼23.97
Turnout		192,174	89.69%	▲1.83
Total valid votes		192,146		
Registered electors		214,272		▲3.67
INC gain from JD(S)		Swing	▼14.77	

=== Assembly Election 2018 ===
2018 Karnataka Legislative Assembly election : Nagamangala
Party	Candidate	Votes	%	±%
JD(S)	Suresh Gowda	112,396	61.94%	▲3.82
INC	N. Chaluvaraya Swamy	64,729	35.67%	▼9.18
BJP	Gowda Dr. Parthasarathy. V	1,915	1.06%	▲0.35
NOTA	None of the above	647	0.36%	New
Margin of victory		47,667	26.27%	▲13.00
Turnout		181,583	87.86%	▲6.22
Total valid votes		181,472		
Registered electors		206,678		▲2.93
JD(S) hold		Swing	▲3.82	

=== Assembly Election 2013 ===
2013 Karnataka Legislative Assembly election : Nagamangala
Party	Candidate	Votes	%	±%
JD(S)	N. Chaluvaraya Swamy	89,203	58.12%	▲12.64
INC	Suresh Gowda	68,840	44.85%	▼4.55
Independent	Murali Hoysala	1,190	0.78%	New
BJP	Dr. Parthasarathi. V. Gowd. A	1,085	0.71%	▼1.16
BSP	H. N. Narasimhamurthy	1,042	0.68%	▼0.11
Margin of victory		20,363	13.27%	▲9.35
Turnout		163,928	81.64%	▲4.31
Total valid votes		153,482		
Registered electors		200,803		▲10.67
JD(S) gain from INC		Swing	▲8.72	

=== Assembly Election 2008 ===
2008 Karnataka Legislative Assembly election : Nagamangala
Party	Candidate	Votes	%	±%
INC	Suresh Gowda	69,259	49.40%	▲5.73
JD(S)	N. Chaluvaraya Swamy	63,766	45.48%	▼3.64
BJP	L. Jayaramegowda	2,618	1.87%	▼0.47
BSP	M. Krishnegowda	1,112	0.79%	New
Independent	Krishnegowda. P. C	978	0.70%	New
Margin of victory		5,493	3.92%	▼1.53
Turnout		140,315	77.33%	▲2.47
Total valid votes		140,195		
Registered electors		181,441		▲21.65
INC gain from JD(S)		Swing	▲0.28	

=== Assembly Election 2004 ===
2004 Karnataka Legislative Assembly election : Nagamangala
Party	Candidate	Votes	%	±%
JD(S)	N. Chaluvaraya Swamy	54,847	49.12%	▼4.89
INC	Shivarame Gouda. L. R	48,760	43.67%	▲4.37
JP	Chikkanna	2,928	2.62%	New
BJP	Dr. Shivamurthy Bhat. I	2,616	2.34%	▲0.89
Kannada Nadu Party	Girigouda. H. J	1,582	1.42%	New
Independent	Shivaramegowda. B. S	919	0.82%	New
Margin of victory		6,087	5.45%	▼9.27
Turnout		111,659	74.86%	▼3.83
Total valid votes		111,652		
Registered electors		149,148		▲11.29
JD(S) hold		Swing	▼4.89	

=== Assembly Election 1999 ===
1999 Karnataka Legislative Assembly election : Nagamangala
Party	Candidate	Votes	%	±%
JD(S)	N. Chaluvaraya Swamy	55,643	54.01%	New
INC	L. R. Shivarame Gowda	40,484	39.30%	▲35.51
Independent	B. R. Narayanaswamy	2,107	2.05%	New
Independent	Md Krishnegowda	1,637	1.59%	New
BJP	B. V. Dharanendra Babu	1,493	1.45%	▼26.75
Independent	T. Chandregowda	1,060	1.03%	New
Margin of victory		15,159	14.72%	▼2.49
Turnout		105,450	78.69%	▼0.40
Total valid votes		103,016		
Rejected ballots		2,333	2.21%	▲0.98
Registered electors		134,014		▲6.19
JD(S) gain from Independent		Swing	▲8.60	

=== Assembly Election 1994 ===
1994 Karnataka Legislative Assembly election : Nagamangala
Party	Candidate	Votes	%	±%
Independent	L. R. Shivarame Gowda	44,719	45.41%	New
BJP	B. V. Dharanendra Babu	27,768	28.20%	New
JD	H. T. Krishnappa	17,107	17.37%	▲1.52
BSP	Manjegowda	4,006	4.07%	New
INC	Narasegowda	3,733	3.79%	▼16.27
Margin of victory		16,951	17.21%	▼19.53
Turnout		99,814	79.09%	▲1.58
Total valid votes		98,472		
Rejected ballots		1,227	1.23%	▼4.44
Registered electors		126,197		▲7.71
Independent hold		Swing	▼11.39	

=== Assembly Election 1989 ===
1989 Karnataka Legislative Assembly election : Nagamangala
Party	Candidate	Votes	%	±%
Independent	L. R. Shivarame Gowda	48,654	56.80%	New
INC	T. M. Chandrashekar	17,185	20.06%	▼2.94
JD	H. T. Krishnappa	13,576	15.85%	New
JP	K. N. Puttegowda	4,214	4.92%	New
Kranti Sabha	D. Melagirigowda	953	1.11%	New
Margin of victory		31,469	36.74%	▲1.86
Turnout		90,809	77.51%	▲7.43
Total valid votes		85,658		
Rejected ballots		5,151	5.67%	▲4.01
Registered electors		117,163		▲26.81
Independent gain from JP		Swing	▼1.09	

=== Assembly Election 1985 ===
1985 Karnataka Legislative Assembly election : Nagamangala
Party	Candidate	Votes	%	±%
JP	H. T. Krishnappa	36,856	57.89%	▲32.51
INC	T. M. Chandrashekar	14,645	23.00%	▲7.79
Independent	P. N. Muddegowda	5,190	8.15%	New
BJP	B. V. Dharanendra Babu	3,663	5.75%	▼6.60
LKD	Baburajendra Prasad	2,598	4.08%	New
Margin of victory		22,211	34.88%	▲22.31
Turnout		64,749	70.08%	
Total valid votes		63,671		
Rejected ballots		1,078	1.66%	
Registered electors		92,396		
JP gain from Independent		Swing	▲19.94	

=== Assembly By-election 1984 ===
1984 Karnataka Legislative Assembly by-election : Nagamangala
Party	Candidate	Votes	%	±%
Independent	H. T. Krishnappa	23,744	37.95%	New
JP	Kempamma(w)	15,879	25.38%	▲9.36
INC	L. R. S. Gowda	9,516	15.21%	▼9.27
BJP	D. Babu	7,726	12.35%	New
Independent	D. T. T. Gowda	3,941	6.30%	New
Independent	Shivanna	938	1.50%	New
Independent	C. N. Gowda	484	0.77%	New
Margin of victory		7,865	12.57%	▼21.98
Total valid votes		62,568		
Independent hold		Swing	▼21.08	

=== Assembly Election 1983 ===
1983 Karnataka Legislative Assembly election : Nagamangala
Party	Candidate	Votes	%	±%
Independent	Chigarigowda	36,966	59.03%	New
INC	H. T. Krishnappa	15,332	24.48%	▲0.06
JP	D. T. Thimmegowda	10,033	16.02%	▼14.91
Margin of victory		21,634	34.55%	▲25.77
Turnout		63,664	77.41%	▼2.33
Total valid votes		62,619		
Rejected ballots		1,045	1.64%	▼0.15
Registered electors		82,243		▲7.82
Independent hold		Swing	▲19.32	

=== Assembly Election 1978 ===
1978 Karnataka Legislative Assembly election : Nagamangala
Party	Candidate	Votes	%	±%
Independent	H. T. Krishnappa	23,721	39.71%	New
JP	K. Singarigowda	18,475	30.93%	New
INC	Chigarigowda	14,586	24.42%	▼19.19
Independent	T. M. Chandrashekar	965	1.62%	New
Independent	N. L. Byregowda	856	1.43%	New
Independent	Marigowda	669	1.12%	New
Margin of victory		5,246	8.78%	▼4.00
Turnout		60,825	79.74%	
Total valid votes		59,734		
Rejected ballots		1,091	1.79%	
Registered electors		76,280		
Independent gain from INC(O)		Swing	▼16.68	

=== Assembly By-election 1972 ===
1972 Mysore State Legislative Assembly by-election : Nagamangala
Party	Candidate	Votes	%	±%
INC(O)	H. T. Krishnappa	28,896	56.39%	▲20.51
INC	C. Gowda	22,348	43.61%	▼14.13
Margin of victory		6,548	12.78%	▼9.08
Total valid votes		51,244		
INC(O) gain from INC		Swing	▼1.35	

=== Assembly Election 1972 ===
1972 Mysore State Legislative Assembly election : Nagamangala
Party	Candidate	Votes	%	±%
INC	T. N. Madappa Gowda	24,729	57.74%	▲0.15
INC(O)	H. T. Krishnappa	15,365	35.88%	New
Independent	T. Nataraj	2,733	6.38%	New
Margin of victory		9,364	21.86%	▲2.51
Turnout		43,657	61.60%	▼9.21
Total valid votes		42,827		
Registered electors		70,870		▲12.42
INC hold		Swing	▲0.15	

=== Assembly Election 1967 ===
1967 Mysore State Legislative Assembly election : Nagamangala
Party	Candidate	Votes	%	±%
INC	K. S. Gowda	24,428	57.59%	▲13.74
Independent	T. N. Madappa Gowda	16,219	38.24%	New
Independent	Challapeddamalakondaiah	1,771	4.18%	New
Margin of victory		8,209	19.35%	▲7.04
Turnout		44,638	70.81%	▲0.16
Total valid votes		42,418		
Registered electors		63,041		▲24.48
INC gain from Independent		Swing	▲1.44	

=== Assembly Election 1962 ===
1962 Mysore State Legislative Assembly election : Nagamangala
Party	Candidate	Votes	%	±%
Independent	T. N. Madappa Gowda	19,275	56.15%	New
INC	K. Singarigowda	15,050	43.85%	▼8.40
Margin of victory		4,225	12.31%	▲7.81
Turnout		35,781	70.65%	▲3.58
Total valid votes		34,325		
Registered electors		50,643		▲11.03
Independent gain from INC		Swing	▲3.90	

=== Assembly Election 1957 ===
1957 Mysore State Legislative Assembly election : Nagamangala
Party	Candidate	Votes	%	±%
INC	T. Mariappa	15,985	52.25%	▼6.90
PSP	K. Mariappa	14,607	47.75%	New
Margin of victory		1,378	4.50%	▼13.81
Turnout		30,592	67.07%	
Total valid votes		30,592		
Registered electors		45,612		
INC hold		Swing	▼6.90	

=== Assembly By-election 1953 ===
1953 Mysore State Legislative Assembly by-election : Nagamangala
Party	Candidate	Votes	%	±%
INC	K. Singarigowda	14,458	59.15%	▲14.73
Independent	J. Thimmegowda	9,983	40.85%	New
Margin of victory		4,475	18.31%	▲7.15
Total valid votes		24,441		
INC gain from Independent		Swing	▲3.57	

=== Assembly Election 1952 ===
1952 Mysore State Legislative Assembly election : Nagamangala
Party	Candidate	Votes	%	±%
Independent	M. Shankaralinge Gowda	14,908	55.58%	New
INC	K. Singarigowda	11,914	44.42%	New
Margin of victory		2,994	11.16%	
Turnout		26,822	57.49%	
Total valid votes		26,822		
Registered electors		46,656		
Independent win (new seat)				

== See also ==
- Mandya district
- List of constituencies of Karnataka Legislative Assembly
