= T. Mariappa =

Indian politician

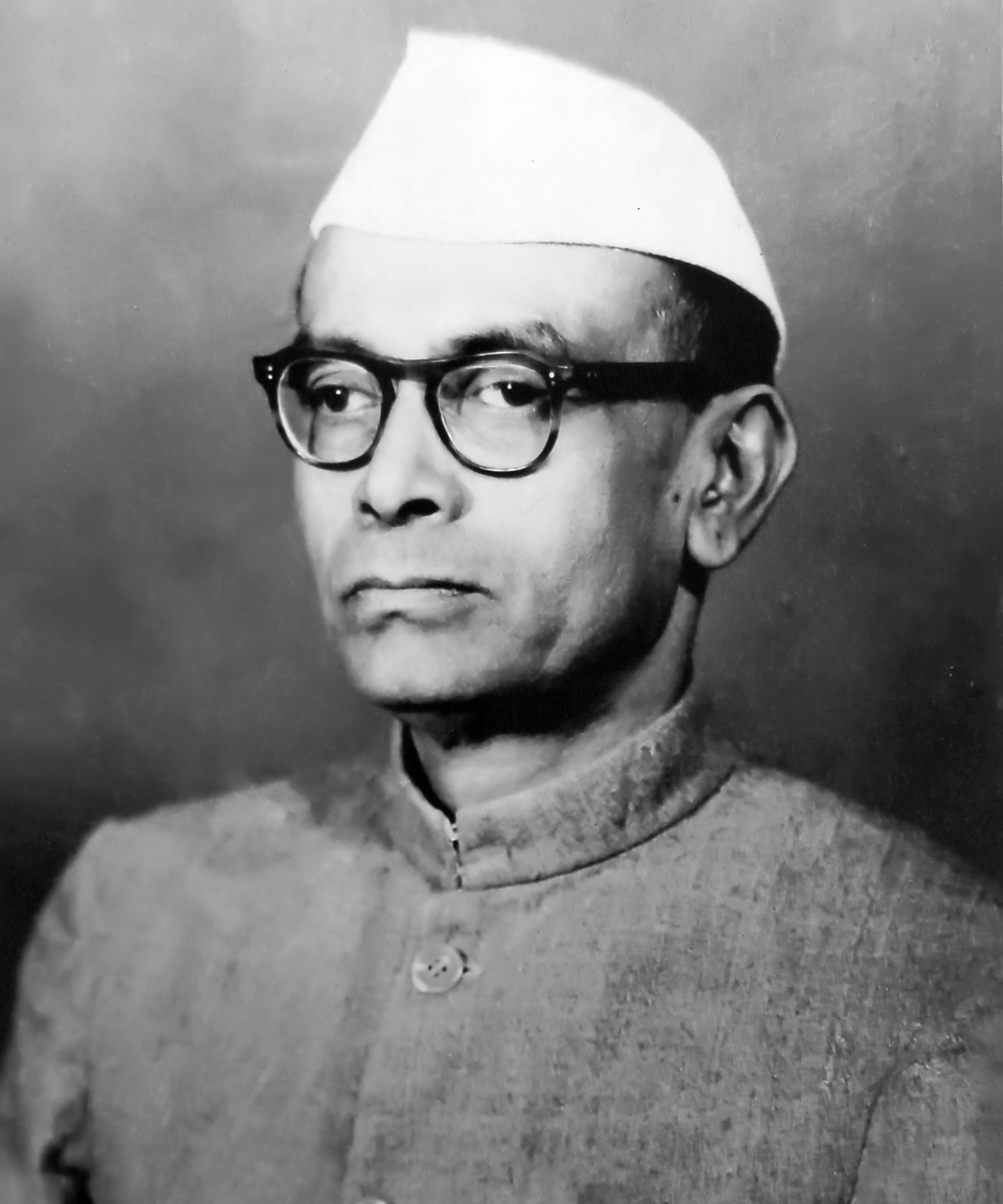

Cabinet Minister for Finance, Government of Karnataka
- In office 16 November 1956 – 9 March 1962
- Chief minister: S. Nijalingappa, B. D. Jatti
- Constituency: Nagamangala

Cabinet Minister for Sericulture, Government of Karnataka
- In office March 1957 – 9 March 1962
- Chief minister: S. Nijalingappa, B. D. Jatti
- Constituency: Nagamangala

Cabinet Minister for Home Affairs, Government of Karnataka
- In office 1947–1952
- Chief minister: K. C. Reddy
- Preceded by: Position Established

Cabinet Minister for Food and civil Supplies, Government of Karnataka
- In office 1950–1952
- Chief minister: K. C. Reddy

Cabinet Minister for Transport, Government of Karnataka
- In office 1950–1952
- Chief minister: K. C. Reddy

Cabinet Minister for Mysore Railways, Government of Karnataka
- In office 1947–1950
- Chief minister: K. C. Reddy

Cabinet Minister for Mysore Army, Government of Karnataka
- In office 1947–1950
- Chief minister: K. C. Reddy

Member of the Mysore Legislative Assembly for Nagamangala
- In office 1957–1962
- Preceded by: M. Shankaralinge Gowda
- Succeeded by: T. N. Madappa Gowda

Member of the Mysore Legislative Assembly for Mysore City North
- In office 1952–1957
- Preceded by: Position Established
- Succeeded by: Position disestablished

Personal details
- Born: 30 June 1904 Nagamangala Taluk, Kallanakere- Beereswarapura, British India (present-day Karnataka, India)
- Died: 2 October 1964 (aged 60) Bengaluru, Karnataka, India
- Party: Indian National Congress

T. Mariappa (1904–1964) was a finance minister of Mysore State, India.

He was also a member of the first Backward Classes Commission, set up in 1953 by the Government of India to investigate and advise on socio-economically deprived communities in

the country.

== Early life ==
Tigali Mariappa B.A., L.L.B. (1904–1964)

Freedom fighter

Name of the Father:- Tigali Mariappa Maistry.

Name of the mother – Hombalamma

Name of grandfather – Tigali Mari Gowda

- Tigali is a small village near Coimbatore.
- Tigali Mari Gowda was a labour contractor for a tea estate in Ooty.
- Tigali Mari Gowda was also a contractor for supply of Kambalies to tea estates.
- He migrated to Kallanakere (Beereshwarapura) in the 19th century in search of laborers and for supply of Kambalies.
- Father of Tigali Mariappa was known by the name Tigali Mariaya Maistry.
- Tigali Mariya Maistry continued the business of his father Tigali Mari Gowda.
- Tigali Mariya Maistry due to his business association with Britishers took a keen interest in the education of his first son Tigali Mariappa.
- Tigali Mariappa also continued the business of his father Tigali Mariya Maistry till 1924.

== Education ==
- 1909–1920 – Primary and secondary education in A.V. School, Nagamangala.
- 1920–1924 – Maharaja’s College Mysore.
- 1924–1928 – Law College Pune

And was a classmate of Shri. S. Nijalingappa, Chief Minister of Mysore.

== Career ==
T. Mariappa with Shri Sowcarchanniah

Budget by Shri T. Mariappa

T. Mariappa with Shri. Jawaharlal Nehru

- 1928–1947 – Advocate at Mysore in the office of the Shri. H.C. Dasappa who was a union railway minister in the cabinet of Shri. Pandit Jawaharlal Nehru and Shri. Lal Bahadur Shastri.
- 1929–1947 – Member of Mysore Representative Assembly. Member of Legislative Council Mysore. Leader of Constitution Assembly Mysore.
- 1947–1950 – Minister for Home, Mysore Railways, Mysore Army in the cabinet of Shri. K.C. Reddy
- 1950–1952 – Minister for Home, Transport, Food and civil Supplies.
- 1952–1957 – MLA for Mysore City North.
- 1953–1955 – Member and author of the report of KAKA KALELKAR Commission for Backward Classes, Govt. of India.
- 1956–1957 – Minister for Finance in the New Mysore State (Now Karnataka).
- 1957–1962 – MLA for Nagamangala, Mandya District.
- 1957–1962 – Minister for Finance and Sericulture-In the cabinet of Shri. S. Nijaligappa/ Shri. B.D. Jatti.

== Other positions held ==
- 1940–1947:- President of the Labour union of K.R. Mills Mysore.
- 1952–1955:- President of the Labour union of Post and Telegraph Employees.
- 1955–1956:- General secretary, Mysore Pradesh Congress Committee
- 1955–1956:- Director H.M.T.
- 1962–1964:- Director Hindustan Photo Films/ Indian Telephone Industry.
- 1963–1964:- Legal Adviser MICO Bangalore.

== Critical issues and events ==
- 1948 :- Dr. K. M. Munshi in his autobiography has admired the handling of Hindu Muslim riots by T. Mariappa as minister for Home.
- 1955 :- The British Guiana Government in its official website has recorded the role of T.M. Mariappa as General Secretary, MPCC in organizing the visit of Mr. Cheddi Jagan, the then Chief Minister of British Guiana Government who had come to India to seek the support of Indian people for ending the British rule in Guiana, South America.

== Recognition of role in the State of Mysore and Karnataka ==
- 1995:- University of Mysore awarded Ph.D. to Mr. Narayanappa Lecture in History on his Thesis
- "Mysore SAMSTHAANADA APRATHISTHITHA NAYAKATVADA ONDU ADHYAYANA-T. MARIAPPA (1904–1964)”
