= Tirthahalli Koppa Assembly constituency =

Former constituency in Karnataka, India

Coordinates: 13.594581°N 75.310521°E

Tirthahalli Koppa
- Former constituency for the State Legislative Assembly

Constituency details
- Country: India
- State: Mysore State
- Division: Bangalore and Mysore
- District: Shimoga and Chikmagalur
- Lok Sabha constituency: Shimoga
- Established: 1951
- Abolished: 1957

Tirthahalli Koppa Assembly constituency was one of the Vidhan Sabha constituencies in the state assembly of Mysore State, in India. It was part of Shimoga Lok Sabha constituency.

== Members of the Legislative Assembly ==
Election	Member	Party
1952	Kadidal Manjappa	Indian National Congress

== Election results ==
=== Assembly Election 1952 ===
1952 Mysore State Legislative Assembly election : Tirthahalli Koppa
Party	Candidate	Votes	%	±%
INC	Kadidal Manjappa	16,570	59.55%	New
ABJS	K. Ramakrishna Rao	7,552	27.14%	New
Socialist Party (India)	G. Sadasivs Rao	3,705	13.31%	New
Margin of victory		9,018	32.41%	
Turnout		27,827	70.48%	
Total valid votes		27,827		
Registered electors		39,480		
INC win (new seat)				
