= Tirthahalli Assembly constituency =

Legislative Assembly constituency in Karnataka State, India

Coordinates: 13.69°N 75.25°E

Tirthahalli
- Constituency No. 114 for the Karnataka Legislative Assembly

Constituency details
- Country: India
- Region: South India
- State: Karnataka
- District: Shimoga
- Lok Sabha constituency: Shimoga
- Established: 1956
- Total electors: 188,267
- Reservation: None

Member of Legislative Assembly
- 16th Karnataka Legislative Assembly
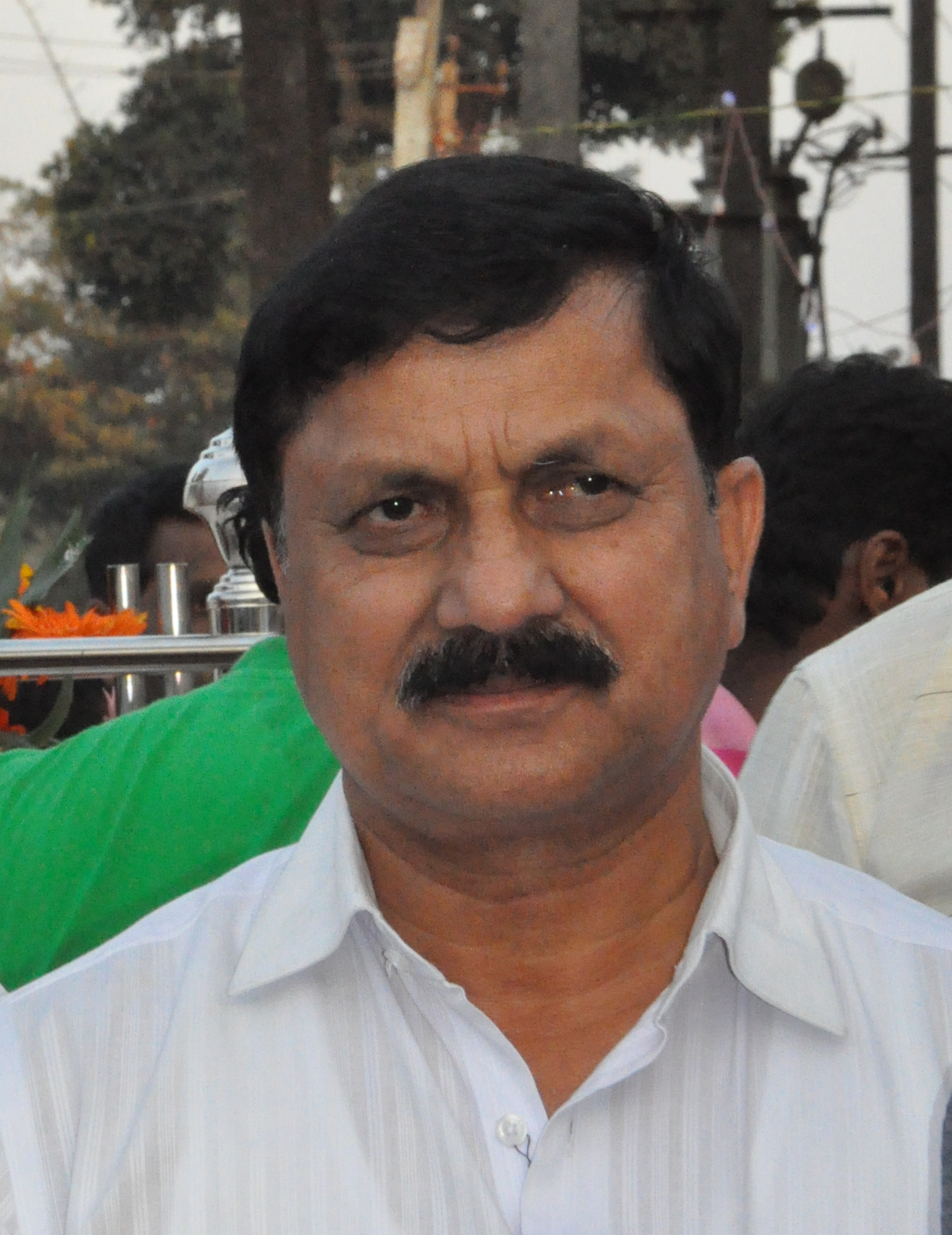
- Incumbent Araga Jnanendra
- Party: Bharatiya Janata Party
- Elected year: 2023
- Preceded by: Kimmane Rathnakar

Tirthahalli Assembly constituency is one of the 224 Legislative Assembly constituencies of Karnataka in India.

It is part of Shimoga district.

== Members of the Legislative Assembly ==
Election	Member	Party
1957	A. R. Badri Narayan	Indian National Congress
1962	Shantaveri Gopala Gowda	Socialist Party
1967	Shantaveri Gopala Gowda	Sanghata Socialist Party
1972	Konandur Lingappa	Samyukta Socialist Party
1978	Kadilal Divakar	Indian National Congress
1983	D. B. Chandregowda	Janata Party
1985	Patamakki Rathnakara	Indian National Congress
1989	D. B. Chandregowda	Janata Dal
1994	Araga Jnanendra	Bharatiya Janata Party
1999	Araga Jnanendra	Bharatiya Janata Party
2004	Araga Jnanendra	Bharatiya Janata Party
2008	Kimmane Rathnakar	Indian National Congress
2013	Kimmane Rathnakar	Indian National Congress
2018	Araga Jnanendra	Bharatiya Janata Party
2023	Araga Jnanendra	Bharatiya Janata Party

== Election results ==
=== Assembly Election 2023 ===
2023 Karnataka Legislative Assembly election : Tirthahalli
Party	Candidate	Votes	%	±%
BJP	Araga Jnanendra	84,563	52.28	▲9.25
INC	Kimmane Rathnakar	72,322	44.71	▲15.67
JD(S)	Yadur Rajaram	2,710	1.68	▼23.89
NOTA	None of the above	1,164	0.72	▼0.04
Margin of victory		12,241	7.57	▼6.42
Turnout		161,852	85.97	▲0.71
Total valid votes		161,756		
Registered electors		188,267		▲2.21
BJP hold		Swing	▲9.25	

=== Assembly Election 2018 ===
2018 Karnataka Legislative Assembly election : Tirthahalli
Party	Candidate	Votes	%	±%
BJP	Araga Jnanendra	67,527	43.03	▲18.17
INC	Kimmane Rathnakar	45,572	29.04	▲2.22
JD(S)	R. M. Manjunatha Gowda	40,127	25.57	▲10.20
NOTA	None of the above	1,195	0.76	New
Margin of victory		21,955	13.99	▲13.02
Turnout		157,044	85.26	▲3.29
Total valid votes		156,920		
Registered electors		184,189		▲8.43
BJP gain from INC		Swing	▲16.21	

=== Assembly Election 2013 ===
2013 Karnataka Legislative Assembly election : Tirthahalli
Party	Candidate	Votes	%	±%
INC	Kimmane Rathnakar	37,160	26.82	▼19.80
KJP	R. M. Manjunatha Gowda	35,817	25.85	New
BJP	Araga Jnanendra	34,446	24.86	▼18.68
JD(S)	R. Madan	21,295	15.37	▲12.61
BSRCP	Ashokamurthy	5,161	3.72	New
Independent	H. B. Kiran Kumar	1,627	1.17	New
Independent	Jadugar Nischal. V. Shetty	1,363	0.98	New
BSP	Kunaje Manjunatha Gowda	1,062	0.77	▼0.04
Margin of victory		1,343	0.97	▼2.11
Turnout		139,246	81.97	▲3.01
Total valid votes		138,566		
Registered electors		169,867		▲7.85
INC hold		Swing	▼19.80	

=== Assembly Election 2008 ===
2008 Karnataka Legislative Assembly election : Tirthahalli
Party	Candidate	Votes	%	±%
INC	Kimmane Rathnakar	57,932	46.62	▼0.28
BJP	Araga Jnanendra	54,106	43.54	▼4.75
SP	Kadthuru Dinesh	4,649	3.74	New
JD(S)	M. G. Mani Hegade	3,435	2.76	▼0.05
Independent	Sitharama Bhatta. T. S	2,344	1.89	New
BSP	Umesha D. Gowda	1,001	0.81	New
Margin of victory		3,826	3.08	▲1.69
Turnout		124,364	78.96	▲1.95
Total valid votes		124,277		
Registered electors		157,503		▲22.28
INC gain from BJP		Swing	▼1.67	

=== Assembly Election 2004 ===
2004 Karnataka Legislative Assembly election : Tirthahalli
Party	Candidate	Votes	%	±%
BJP	Araga Jnanendra	47,843	48.29	▲10.40
INC	Kimmane Rathnakar	46,468	46.90	▲18.09
JD(S)	Rama Manohar Shantaveri	2,786	2.81	▼30.48
JP	Umesha D. Gowda	1,025	1.03	New
Independent	Ramesha Karki	958	0.97	New
Margin of victory		1,375	1.39	▼3.21
Turnout		99,191	77.01	▲0.89
Total valid votes		99,080		
Registered electors		128,808		▲7.24
BJP hold		Swing	▲10.40	

=== Assembly Election 1999 ===
1999 Karnataka Legislative Assembly election : Tirthahalli
Party	Candidate	Votes	%	±%
BJP	Araga Jnanendra	33,778	37.89	▲2.28
JD(S)	Kimmane Rathnakar	29,676	33.29	New
INC	Kadilal Divakar	25,682	28.81	▲11.39
Margin of victory		4,102	4.60	▲1.26
Turnout		91,425	76.12	▲0.07
Total valid votes		89,136		
Rejected ballots		2,212	2.42	▲1.41
Registered electors		120,112		▲2.31
BJP hold		Swing	▲2.28	

=== Assembly Election 1994 ===
1994 Karnataka Legislative Assembly election : Tirthahalli
Party	Candidate	Votes	%	±%
BJP	Araga Jnanendra	31,440	35.61	▲14.04
JD	D. B. Chandregowda	28,488	32.26	▼5.39
INC	Kadilal Divakar	15,378	17.42	▼16.49
INC	D. Laxmana	8,321	9.42	New
KRRS	G. S. Rajendra	3,813	4.32	New
Margin of victory		2,952	3.34	▼0.40
Turnout		89,274	76.05	▲2.00
Total valid votes		88,298		
Rejected ballots		904	1.01	▼2.01
Registered electors		117,396		▲0.20
BJP gain from JD		Swing	▼2.04	

=== Assembly Election 1989 ===
1989 Karnataka Legislative Assembly election : Tirthahalli
Party	Candidate	Votes	%	±%
JD	D. B. Chandregowda	31,671	37.65	New
INC	Kadilal Divakar	28,526	33.91	▼8.93
BJP	Araga Jnanendra	18,142	21.57	▲8.97
JP	Hugalavalli Surendra	5,078	6.04	New
Margin of victory		3,145	3.74	▲3.63
Turnout		86,751	74.05	▼1.67
Total valid votes		84,127		
Rejected ballots		2,624	3.02	▲1.80
Registered electors		117,156		▲28.04
JD gain from INC		Swing	▼5.19	

=== Assembly Election 1985 ===
1985 Karnataka Legislative Assembly election : Tirthahalli
Party	Candidate	Votes	%	±%
INC	Patamakki Rathnakara	29,322	42.84	▲10.03
JP	D. B. Chandregowda	29,248	42.74	▲5.85
BJP	Araga Jnanendra	8,624	12.60	▼17.12
Independent	Jagadish	641	0.94	New
Independent	S. T. Devaraja	461	0.67	New
Margin of victory		74	0.11	▼3.97
Turnout		69,287	75.72	▲6.94
Total valid votes		68,440		
Rejected ballots		847	1.22	▼0.49
Registered electors		91,503		▲6.41
INC gain from JP		Swing	▲5.95	

=== Assembly Election 1983 ===
1983 Karnataka Legislative Assembly election : Tirthahalli
Party	Candidate	Votes	%	±%
JP	D. B. Chandregowda	21,442	36.89	▲11.35
INC	Kadilal Divakar	19,071	32.81	▲26.44
BJP	Araga Jnanendra	17,278	29.72	New
Margin of victory		2,371	4.08	▼26.46
Turnout		59,139	68.78	▼9.38
Total valid votes		58,128		
Rejected ballots		1,011	1.71	▼0.20
Registered electors		85,988		▲12.73
JP gain from INC(I)		Swing	▼19.19	

=== Assembly Election 1978 ===
1978 Karnataka Legislative Assembly election : Tirthahalli
Party	Candidate	Votes	%	±%
INC(I)	Kadilal Divakar	32,798	56.08	New
JP	Konandur Lingappa	14,938	25.54	New
Independent	K. M. Sreenivas Kalammanagudi	5,708	9.76	New
INC	B. N. Rangappa	3,727	6.37	▼24.24
Independent	K. T. Danamma	484	0.83	New
Independent	Narayana	445	0.76	New
Independent	T. P. Sreenath	386	0.66	New
Margin of victory		17,860	30.54	▲24.43
Turnout		59,622	78.16	▲10.40
Total valid votes		58,486		
Rejected ballots		1,136	1.91	▲1.91
Registered electors		76,281		▲19.93
INC(I) gain from SSP		Swing	▲19.36	

=== Assembly Election 1972 ===
1972 Mysore State Legislative Assembly election : Tirthahalli
Party	Candidate	Votes	%	±%
SSP	Konandur Lingappa	15,425	36.72	New
INC	K. T. Danamma	12,859	30.61	▼11.93
CPI(M)	B. N. Appanna Hegde	12,243	29.14	New
INC(O)	Susheelamma	1,483	3.53	New
Margin of victory		2,566	6.11	▼8.80
Turnout		43,101	67.76	▼6.94
Total valid votes		42,010		
Registered electors		63,606		▲18.48
SSP gain from SSP		Swing	▼20.74	

=== Assembly Election 1967 ===
1967 Mysore State Legislative Assembly election : Tirthahalli
Party	Candidate	Votes	%	±%
SSP	Shantaveri Gopala Gowda	21,963	57.46	New
INC	B. S. Viswanath	16,262	42.54	▲24.19
Margin of victory		5,701	14.91	▼22.99
Turnout		40,105	74.70	▲12.45
Total valid votes		38,225		
Registered electors		53,686		▼9.21
SSP gain from Socialist Party (India)		Swing	▲1.21	

=== Assembly Election 1962 ===
1962 Mysore State Legislative Assembly election : Tirthahalli
Party	Candidate	Votes	%	±%
Socialist Party (India)	Shantaveri Gopala Gowda	18,649	56.25	New
INC	K. T. Danamma	6,085	18.35	▼43.02
Independent	Swamy Rao	3,685	11.12	New
Independent	Virupakshappa Gowda	1,751	5.28	New
Independent	Venkappa Heggade	1,645	4.96	New
ABJS	Ramakrishna Prabhu	1,338	4.04	New
Margin of victory		12,564	37.90	▲15.15
Turnout		36,812	62.25	▼11.60
Total valid votes		33,153		
Registered electors		59,133		▲15.87
Socialist Party (India) gain from INC		Swing	▼5.12	

=== Assembly Election 1957 ===
1957 Mysore State Legislative Assembly election : Tirthahalli
Party	Candidate	Votes	%	±%
INC	A. R. Badri Narayan	23,131	61.37	New
Independent	J. S. Gopala Gouda	14,557	38.63	New
Margin of victory		8,574	22.75	
Turnout		37,688	73.85	
Total valid votes		37,688		
Registered electors		51,034		
INC win (new seat)				

== See also ==
- List of constituencies of the Karnataka Legislative Assembly
- Shimoga district
