= K. Chengalaraya Reddy =

Indian politician

Kyasamballi Chengalaraya Reddy
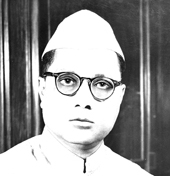

3rd Governor of Madhya Pradesh
- In office 10 February 1966 – 7 March 1971
- Chief Minister: Dwarka Prasad Mishra; Govind Narayan Singh; Nareshchandra Singh; Shyama Charan Shukla
- Preceded by: P. V. Dixit (acting)
- Succeeded by: Satya Narayan Sinha
- In office 11 February 1965 – 2 February 1966
- Chief Minister: Dwarka Prasad Mishra
- Preceded by: Hari Vinayak Pataskar
- Succeeded by: P. V. Dixit (acting)

Minister of Commerce and Industry
- In office 5 April 1961 – 19 July 1963
- Prime Minister: Jawaharlal Nehru
- Preceded by: Lal Bahadur Shastri
- Succeeded by: Manubhai Shah

1st Chief Minister of Mysore State
- In office 26 January 1950 – 30 March 1952
- Preceded by: Office Established
- Succeeded by: Kengal Hanumanthaiah

1st Prime Minister of Mysore State
- In office 25 October 1947 – 26 January 1950
- Preceded by: Office Established
- Succeeded by: Himself as Chief Minister

Personal details
- Born: 4 May 1902 Kyasamballi, Kolar District, Kingdom of Mysore, Mysore Residency, British India (Now in Kyasamballi, Kolar District, Karnataka, India)
- Died: 27 February 1976 (aged 73)
- Party: Indian National Congress

Kyasamballi Chengaluraya Reddy (4 May 1902 – 27 February 1976) was the first Chief Minister of Mysore State (Now Karnataka). Reddy later served as the governor of Madhya Pradesh.

== Early life ==
K.C. Reddy was born on 4 May 1902 into a Reddy family in Kyasamballi village, Kolar district. He was a revolutionary from childhood and participated in many protests against British rule in India.

== Career ==
After graduating in law, Reddy along with other political activists, founded the Praja Paksha (Peoples' Party) in 1930. The aim of this party was to achieve responsible government uin the Princely state of Mysore. The party gained support in rural areas as it largely highlighted the issues of farmers. The Praja Paksha and Praja Mitra Mandali joined to form the Praja Samyukta Paksha (Mysore People's Federation) in 1934. Reddy served as its president from 1935 to 1937. Later, the federation merged with the Indian National Congress and participated in the Indian independence movement. Reddy served as the president of Mysore Congress twice, in 1937–38 and 1946–47. He was also a member of the Constituent Assembly of India.

After independence of India in 1947, he was at the forefront of the Mysore Chalo movement seeking responsible state government in Mysore State and went on to become the first Chief Minister of the state. He served in this position from 1947 to 1952.

Reddy was elected as a member of the Mysore Legislative Assembly in 1952 representing Bangarapet.Subsequently, he served as a member of the Rajya Sabha from 1952 to 1957 and as a member of the Lok Sabha, representing Kolar from 1957 to 1962. During this period, he also served as Union Minister for Housing and Supplies (1957–61) and as Union Minister for Commerce and Industries (1961–62). Later, he also served as Governor of Madhya Pradesh from 1965 to 1971.

Reddy's birth centenary was commemorated in 2002 when his contribution towards the development of Karnataka was hailed. The 30 kilometre section of Outer Ring Road in Bengaluru, from Hebbal to Central Silk Board, is named after KC Reddy.

== See also ==
- List of chief ministers of Mysore State
- List of governors of Madhya Pradesh

| Preceded by Post established | Chief Minister of Mysore State; 25 October 1947 – 30 March 1952 | Succeeded by Kengal Hanumanthaiah |
