= Thirthahalli =

- Taluk
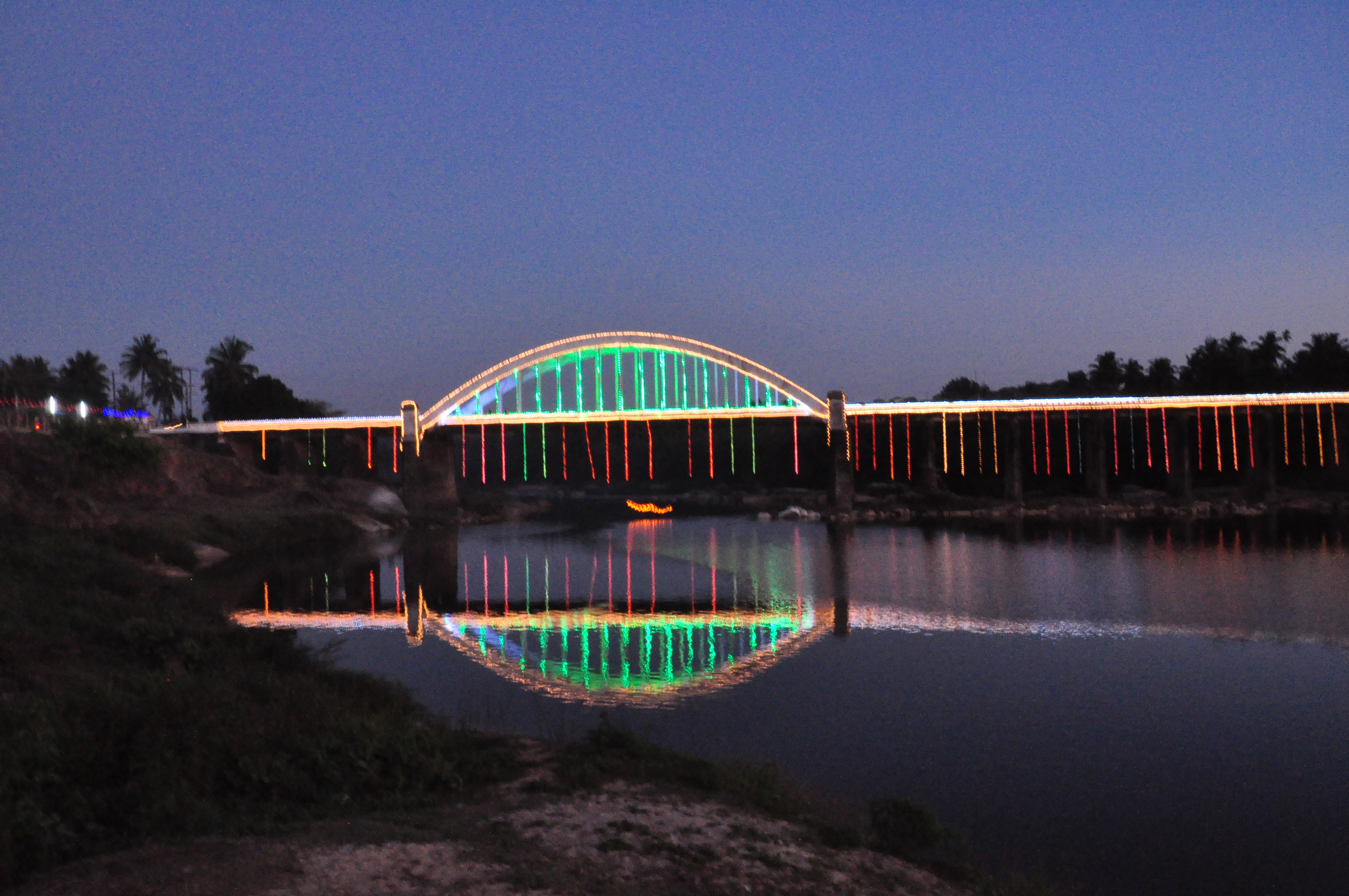
- Tunga Bridge with Lightings during Theppotsava

- Location in Karnataka, India
- Coordinates: 13.690°N 75.245°E
- Country: India
- State: Karnataka
- District: Shimoga district
- Region: Malenadu

Government
  - MLA: Araga Jnanendra

Area
  - Total: 5.91 km^{2} (2.28 sq mi)
- Elevation 566: 591 m (1,939 ft)

Population (2011)
  - Total: 142,006
  - Density: 24,000/km^{2} (62,200/sq mi)
- Time zone: UTC+5:30 (IST)
- PIN: 577 432
- Telephone code: 08181
- Vehicle registration: KA-14
- Website: www.thirthahallitown.gov.in

Thirthahalli is a panchayat town located in the Shimoga district of the state of Karnataka, India. It lies on the bank of the river Tunga and is also the headquarters of the Thirthahalli Taluk of Shimoga district.

== Geography ==
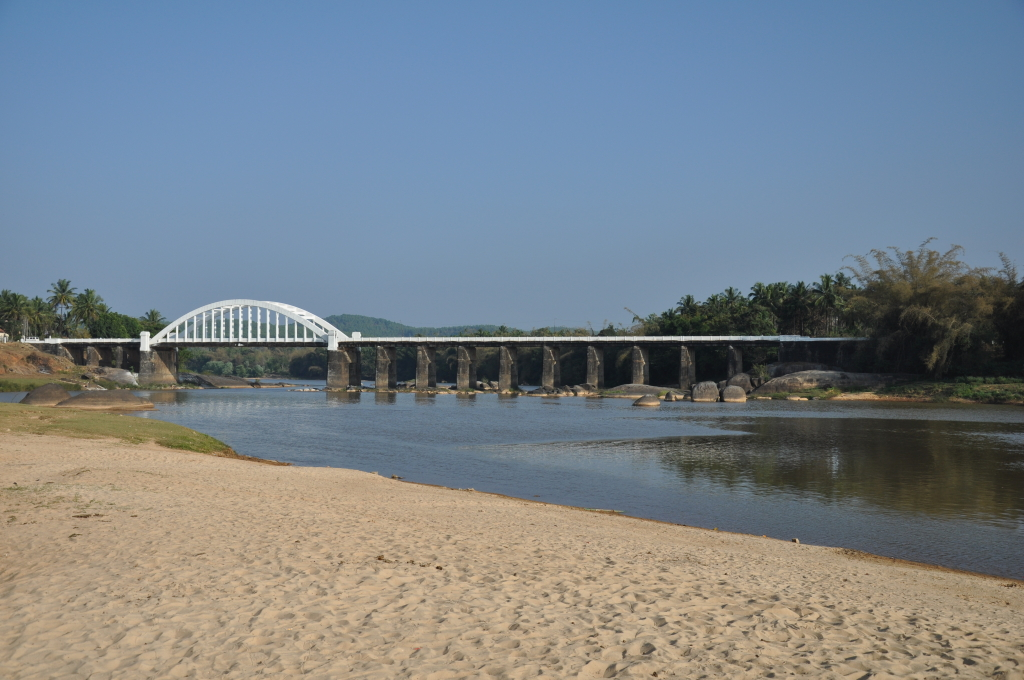
Bridge across the river Tunga at Thirthahalli

Thirthahalli is located at 13.7°N 75.23°E. It has an average elevation of 591 metres (1938 feet). The Tirthahalli Town Panchayat has population of 14,528, of which 7,093 are males and 7,435 are females as per report released by Census India 2011.

== Notable people ==
- Purandara Dasa – One of the founding proponents of Carnatic Music.
- Kuvempu – Kannada author and poet, Jnanapeetha and Padma Vibhushan awardee.
- Shantaveri Gopala Gowda – Socialist Leader and Politician.
- U. R. Ananthamurthy – Contemporary writer, Novelist and critic, Jnanapeetha and Padma Bhushan awardee.
- Kadidal Manjappa – Politician and former Chief Minister of Karnataka.
- Justice. M Rama Jois – Advocate and Chief Justice, Former Governor of Jharkhand and Bihar.
- M. K. Indira – Kannada Novelist.
- Poornachandra Tejaswi – Writer, environmentalist, and son of Kuvempu.
- Anupama Niranjana – Novelist.
- Girish Kasaravalli – Multiple award-winning Kannada Film Director, Padmashri awardee.
- Kimmane Rathnakar – Politician and former minister of Legislative assembly.
- Araga Jnanendra – Home Minister of Karnataka and former chairman of Mysore Paper Mills.
- Kaviraj (lyricist) – Poet, lyricist, director in Kannada film industry.
- Diganth – Kannada film actor.

== Education institutions ==
- Tunga Mahavidyalaya
- Sevabharathi Higher Primary School
