= Politics of Karnataka =

The politics of Karnataka is represented by three major political parties, the Indian National Congress, the Janata Dal (Secular) and the Bharatiya Janata Party. The Janata Dal (Secular) and the Indian National Congress led coalition government was in power in the state since May 2018 to July 2019. H.D. Kumaraswamy of the Janata Dal (Secular) was the Chief Minister from 23 May 2018, to 23 July 2019. Presently Siddaramaiah of INC was the CM, forming the government since 20 May 2023 to 3 June 2026.He is followed by DK Shivkumar of the same party who took the role in his place from 3 June 2026.

== In national politics ==
Karnataka consists of 28 parliamentary constituencies from which 28 members of parliament get elected to the Lok Sabha. Several politicians and bureaucrats from Karnataka have served at the center at various times in different capacities. Deve Gowda, who hails from Hassan served as the Prime minister of India in 1996. C. K. Jaffer Sharief from Chitradurga is a veteran Congressman and 9-time MP and former Minister of Railways of Government of India. B. D. Jatti from Bijapur served as the Vice President and also as acting President in the past. S.Nigalingappa from Chitradurga was Congress I president.

== Political parties ==
=== State parties ===
Janata dal (secular)

== Civic organizations ==
There are several organizations like B.PAC (Bangalore Political Action Committee) which help in the civic administration of Bangalore. These organizations are formed by responsible citizens of India like Narayana Murthy (founder of InfoSys), Kiran Mazumdar-Shaw (Biocon), T. V. Mohandas Pai, Nooraine Fazal (educationist), etc. These organizations help in creating social awareness programs, forming transparency in governance, raise voice against corruption, funding for candidates and strive towards the welfare of Citizens.

== See also ==
- Elections in Karnataka
- Government of Karnataka
- Karnataka Legislative Assembly
