= Belagavi Assembly constituency =

Belagavi Assembly constituency may refer to many Vidhana Sabha constituencies in Karnataka.

- Belagavi City Assembly constituency, a defunct constituency
- Belgaum Dakshin Assembly constituency
- Belgaum Uttar Assembly constituency
- Belgaum Rural Assembly constituency
- Belgaum I Assembly constituency, a defunct constituency
- Belgaum II Assembly constituency, a defunct constituency
- Uchagaon Assembly constituency, a defunct constituency
- Hire Bagewadi Assembly constituency, a defunct constituency

== See also ==
- Belgaum Lok Sabha constituency
- Belgaum North Lok Sabha constituency, a defunct constituency
- Belgaum South Lok Sabha constituency, a defunct constituency
