= Minister of Home Affairs (India) =

Head of the Ministry of Home Affairs of the Government of India

- Gr̥ha Mantrī
- Logo of The MHA

- Flag of The Republic of India

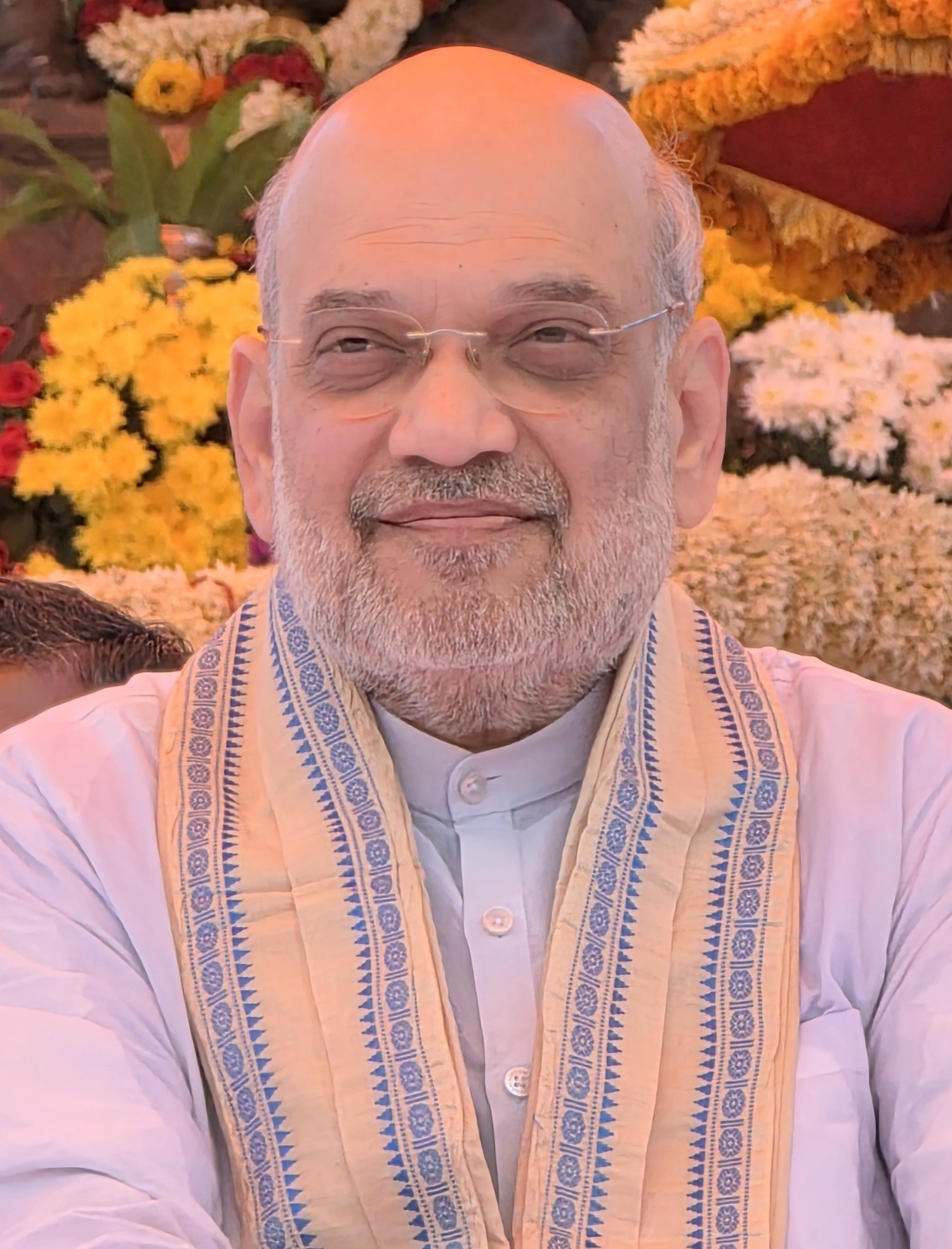
- Incumbent; Amit Shah since 30 May 2019
- Ministry of Home Affairs
- Abbreviation: MHA
- Member of: Council of Ministers of India; Cabinet Committee on Security
- Reports to: President of India; Prime Minister of India; Parliament of India
- Residence: 6A, Krishna Menon Marg, New Delhi
- Seat: Room No. 104, North Block, New Delhi
- Appointer: President of India; on the recommendation of the Prime Minister
- Formation: 15 August 1947
- First holder: Sardar Vallabhbhai Patel
- Deputy: Minister of State for Home Affairs

The minister of home affairs or the home minister is the head of the Ministry of Home Affairs of the Government of India. One of the senior-most portfolios in the Central Cabinet, the chief responsibility of the home minister is the maintenance of the internal security of India; the country's large central police force comes under its jurisdiction. Occasionally, they are assisted by the minister of state of home affairs and the lower-ranked deputy minister of home affairs.

Ever since the time of independent India's first home minister Sardar Vallabhbhai Patel, the office has been seen as second in seniority only to the prime minister in the Central cabinet. Like Patel, home ministers Yashwantrao Chavan and L. K. Advani have since held the additional portfolio of deputy prime minister. As of today, three home ministers have gone on to become the prime minister: Lal Bahadur Shastri, Charan Singh and P. V. Narasimha Rao. Amit Shah is the current and the longest serving home minister in history from 30 May 2019 till date.

On several occasions, the prime minister also held the additional portfolio of the minister of home affairs. Jawaharlal Nehru briefly acted as home minister in 1950 following the demise of Vallabhbhai Patel, Indira Gandhi briefly served as home minister in 1966 following resignation of Gulzarilal Nanda, Morarji Desai held the portfolio from 1978 till 1979, Chandra Shekhar throughout his prime ministerial tenure and H. D. Deve Gowda briefly served as home minister in 1996.

P. Chidambaram who served as the home minister from 2008 till 2012 has the rare distinction of serving as both cabinet minister and minister of state in the ministry. He served as minister of state from 1986 till 1989. The current minister is Amit Shah of the Bharatiya Janata Party who has been in office since 30 May 2019 and succeeded his party colleague Rajnath Singh as the home minister.

== Cabinet ministers ==
No.	Portrait	Minister (birth-death) Constituency	Term of office			Political party	Ministry	Prime Minister
No.	Portrait	Minister (birth-death) Constituency	From	To	Period	Political party	Ministry	Prime Minister
1		Vallabhbhai Patel (1875–1950); MCA for Bombay (Deputy Prime Minister)	15 August 1947	15 December 1950 (died in office)	3 years, 122 days	Indian National Congress	Nehru I	Jawaharlal Nehru
2		Jawaharlal Nehru (1889–1964); MP for United Provinces (Prime Minister)	15 December 1950	26 December 1950	11 days	Indian National Congress	Nehru I	Jawaharlal Nehru
3		C. Rajagopalachari (1878–1972); Unelected	26 December 1950	5 November 1951	314 days	Indian National Congress	Nehru I	Jawaharlal Nehru
4		Kailash Nath Katju (1887–1968); MP for Mandsaur	5 November 1951	13 May 1952	3 years, 66 days	Indian National Congress	Nehru I	Jawaharlal Nehru
4		Kailash Nath Katju (1887–1968); MP for Mandsaur	13 May 1952	10 January 1955	3 years, 66 days	Indian National Congress	Nehru II	Jawaharlal Nehru
5		Govind Ballabh Pant (1887–1961); Rajya Sabha MP for Uttar Pradesh	10 January 1955	17 April 1957	6 years, 56 days	Indian National Congress	Nehru II	Jawaharlal Nehru
5		Govind Ballabh Pant (1887–1961); Rajya Sabha MP for Uttar Pradesh	17 April 1957	7 March 1961 (died in office)	6 years, 56 days	Indian National Congress	Nehru III	Jawaharlal Nehru
6		Lal Bahadur Shastri (1904–1966); MP for Allahabad	8 March 1961	10 April 1962	2 years, 187 days	Indian National Congress	Nehru III	Jawaharlal Nehru
6		Lal Bahadur Shastri (1904–1966); MP for Allahabad	11 April 1962	29 August 1963	2 years, 187 days	Indian National Congress	Nehru IV	Jawaharlal Nehru
7		Gulzarilal Nanda (1898–1998); MP for Sabarkantha (Prime Minister from 27 May – 9 June 1964; and 11 – 24 January 1966)	1 September 1963	27 May 1964	3 years, 69 days	Indian National Congress	Nehru IV	Jawaharlal Nehru
7		Gulzarilal Nanda (1898–1998); MP for Sabarkantha (Prime Minister from 27 May – 9 June 1964; and 11 – 24 January 1966)	27 May 1964	9 June 1964	3 years, 69 days	Indian National Congress	Nanda I	Self
7		Gulzarilal Nanda (1898–1998); MP for Sabarkantha (Prime Minister from 27 May – 9 June 1964; and 11 – 24 January 1966)	9 June 1964	11 January 1966	3 years, 69 days	Indian National Congress	Shastri	Lal Bahadur Shastri
7		Gulzarilal Nanda (1898–1998); MP for Sabarkantha (Prime Minister from 27 May – 9 June 1964; and 11 – 24 January 1966)	11 January 1966	24 January 1966	3 years, 69 days	Indian National Congress	Nanda II	Self
7		Gulzarilal Nanda (1898–1998); MP for Sabarkantha (Prime Minister from 27 May – 9 June 1964; and 11 – 24 January 1966)	24 January 1966	9 November 1966	3 years, 69 days	Indian National Congress	Indira I	Indira Gandhi
8		Indira Gandhi (1917–1984); Rajya Sabha MP for Uttar Pradesh (Prime Minister)	9 November 1966	13 November 1966	4 days	Indian National Congress	Indira I	Indira Gandhi
9		Yashwantrao Chavan (1913–1984); MP for Nashik	13 November 1966	13 March 1967	3 years, 226 days	Indian National Congress	Indira I	Indira Gandhi
9		Yashwantrao Chavan (1913–1984); MP for Nashik	13 March 1967	27 June 1970	3 years, 226 days	Indian National Congress (R)	Indira II	Indira Gandhi
(8)		Indira Gandhi (1917–1984); MP for Rae Bareli (Prime Minister)	27 June 1970	13 March 1971	2 years, 223 days	Indian National Congress (R)	Indira II	Indira Gandhi
(8)		Indira Gandhi (1917–1984); MP for Rae Bareli (Prime Minister)	13 March 1971	5 February 1973	2 years, 223 days	Indian National Congress (R)	Indira III	Indira Gandhi
10		Uma Shankar Dikshit (1901–1991); Rajya Sabha MP for Uttar Pradesh	5 February 1973	10 October 1974	1 year, 247 days	Indian National Congress (R)	Indira III	Indira Gandhi
11		Kasu Brahmananda Reddy (1909–1994); Rajya Sabha MP for Andhra Pradesh	10 October 1974	24 March 1977	2 years, 165 days	Indian National Congress (R)	Indira III	Indira Gandhi
12		Charan Singh (1902–1987); MP for Baghpat	24 March 1977	1 July 1978	1 year, 99 days	Janata Party	Desai	Morarji Desai
13		Morarji Desai (1896–1995); MP for Surat (Prime Minister)	1 July 1978	24 January 1979	207 days	Janata Party	Desai	Morarji Desai
14		Hirubhai M. Patel (1904–1993); MP for Sabarkantha	24 January 1979	28 July 1979	185 days	Janata Party	Desai	Morarji Desai
(9)		Yashwantrao Chavan (1913–1984); MP for Satara (Deputy Prime Minister)	28 July 1979	14 January 1980	170 days	Indian National Congress (Urs)	Charan	Charan Singh
15		Zail Singh (1916–1994); MP for Hoshiarpur	14 January 1980	22 June 1982	2 years, 159 days	Indian National Congress (I)	Indira IV	Indira Gandhi
16		Ramaswamy Venkataraman (1910–2009); MP for Chennai South	22 June 1982	2 September 1982	72 days	Indian National Congress (I)	Indira IV	Indira Gandhi
17		Prakash Chandra Sethi (1919–1996); MP for Indore	2 September 1982	19 July 1984	1 year, 321 days	Indian National Congress (I)	Indira IV	Indira Gandhi
18		P. V. Narasimha Rao (1921–2004); MP for Hanamkonda	19 July 1984	31 October 1984	165 days	Indian National Congress (I)	Indira IV	Indira Gandhi
18		P. V. Narasimha Rao (1921–2004); MP for Hanamkonda	31 October 1984	31 December 1984	165 days	Indian National Congress (I)	Rajiv I	Rajiv Gandhi
19		Shankarrao Chavan (1920–2004); MP for Nanded	31 December 1984	12 March 1986	1 year, 71 days	Indian National Congress (I)	Rajiv II	Rajiv Gandhi
(18)		P. V. Narasimha Rao (1921–2004); MP for Hanamkonda	12 March 1986	12 May 1986	61 days	Indian National Congress (I)	Rajiv II	Rajiv Gandhi
20		Buta Singh (1934–2021); MP for Jalore	12 May 1986	2 December 1989	3 years, 204 days	Indian National Congress (I)	Rajiv II	Rajiv Gandhi
21		Mufti Mohammad Sayeed (1936–2016); MP for Muzaffarnagar	2 December 1989	10 November 1990	1 year, 8 days	Janata Dal	Vishwanath	Vishwanath Pratap Singh
22		Chandra Shekhar (1927–2007); MP for Ballia (Prime Minister)	10 November 1990	21 June 1991	223 days	Samajwadi Janata Party (Rashtriya)	Chandra Shekhar	Himself
(19)		Shankarrao Chavan (1920–2004); Rajya Sabha MP for Maharashtra	21 June 1991	16 May 1996	4 years, 330 days	Indian National Congress (I)	Rao	P. V. Narasimha Rao
23		Murli Manohar Joshi (born 1934); MP for Allahabad	16 May 1996	1 June 1996	16 days	Bharatiya Janata Party	Vajpayee I	Atal Bihari Vajpayee
24		H. D. Deve Gowda (born 1933); Unelected (Prime Minister)	1 June 1996	29 June 1996	28 days	Janata Dal	Deve Gowda	H. D. Deve Gowda
25		Indrajit Gupta (1919–2001); MP for Midnapore	29 June 1996	21 April 1997	1 year, 263 days	Communist Party of India	Deve Gowda	H. D. Deve Gowda
25		Indrajit Gupta (1919–2001); MP for Midnapore	21 April 1997	19 March 1998	1 year, 263 days	Communist Party of India	Gujral	Inder Kumar Gujral
26		L. K. Advani (born 1927); MP for Gandhinagar (Deputy Prime Minister from 29 June 2002)	19 March 1998	13 October 1999	6 years, 64 days	Bharatiya Janata Party	Vajpayee II	Atal Bihari Vajpayee
26		L. K. Advani (born 1927); MP for Gandhinagar (Deputy Prime Minister from 29 June 2002)	13 October 1999	22 May 2004	6 years, 64 days	Bharatiya Janata Party	Vajpayee III	Atal Bihari Vajpayee
27		Shivraj Patil (1935–2025); Rajya Sabha MP for Maharashtra	23 May 2004	30 November 2008	4 years, 191 days	Indian National Congress	Manmohan I	Manmohan Singh
28		P. Chidambaram (born 1945); MP for Sivaganga	30 November 2008	22 May 2009	3 years, 244 days	Indian National Congress	Manmohan I	Manmohan Singh
28		P. Chidambaram (born 1945); MP for Sivaganga	23 May 2009	31 July 2012	3 years, 244 days	Indian National Congress	Manmohan II	Manmohan Singh
29		Sushilkumar Shinde (born 1941); MP for Solapur	31 July 2012	26 May 2014	1 year, 299 days	Indian National Congress	Manmohan II	Manmohan Singh
30		Rajnath Singh (born 1951); MP for Lucknow	26 May 2014	30 May 2019	5 years, 3 days	Bharatiya Janata Party	Modi I	Narendra Modi
31		Amit Shah (born 1964); MP for Gandhinagar	30 May 2019	9 June 2024	7 years, 166 days	Bharatiya Janata Party	Modi II	Narendra Modi
31		Amit Shah (born 1964); MP for Gandhinagar	9 June 2024	Incumbent	7 years, 166 days	Bharatiya Janata Party	Modi III	Narendra Modi

== Ministers of state ==
No.	Portrait	Minister (birth-death) Constituency	Term of office			Political party	Ministry	Prime Minister
No.	Portrait	Minister (birth-death) Constituency	From	To	Period	Political party	Ministry	Prime Minister
1		Rustom Khurshedji Sidhwa (1882–1957)	11 October 1951	13 May 1952	215 days	Indian National Congress	Nehru I	Jawaharlal Nehru
2		B. N. Datar (1894–1963); MP for Belgaum	14 February 1956	17 April 1957	6 years, 364 days	Indian National Congress	Nehru II	Jawaharlal Nehru
2		B. N. Datar (1894–1963); MP for Belgaum	17 April 1957	10 April 1962	6 years, 364 days	Indian National Congress	Nehru III	Jawaharlal Nehru
2		B. N. Datar (1894–1963); MP for Belgaum	16 April 1962	13 February 1963	6 years, 364 days	Indian National Congress	Nehru IV	Jawaharlal Nehru
3		Ramchandra Martand Hajarnavis (1908–1976); MP for Bhandara	22 February 1963	10 March 1964	1 year, 17 days	Indian National Congress	Nehru IV	Jawaharlal Nehru
4		Jaisukhlal Hathi (1909–1982); MP for Gujarat (Rajya Sabha)	10 March 1964	27 May 1964	2 years, 248 days	Indian National Congress	Nehru IV	Jawaharlal Nehru
4		Jaisukhlal Hathi (1909–1982); MP for Gujarat (Rajya Sabha)	27 May 1964	9 June 1964	2 years, 248 days	Indian National Congress	Nanda I	Gulzarilal Nanda
4		Jaisukhlal Hathi (1909–1982); MP for Gujarat (Rajya Sabha)	9 June 1964	11 January 1966	2 years, 248 days	Indian National Congress	Shastri	Lal Bahadur Shastri
4		Jaisukhlal Hathi (1909–1982); MP for Gujarat (Rajya Sabha)	11 January 1966	24 January 1966	2 years, 248 days	Indian National Congress	Nanda II	Gulzarilal Nanda
4		Jaisukhlal Hathi (1909–1982); MP for Gujarat (Rajya Sabha)	24 January 1966	13 November 1966	2 years, 248 days	Indian National Congress	Indira I	Indira Gandhi
5		Vidya Charan Shukla (1929–2013); MP for Mahasamund	13 March 1967	27 June 1970	3 years, 106 days	Indian National Congress	Indira I	Indira Gandhi
6		Ram Niwas Mirdha (1924–2010); MP for Rajasthan (Rajya Sabha) (Personnel and Administrative Reforms)	27 June 1970	18 March 1971	264 days	Indian National Congress (R)	Indira I	Indira Gandhi
7		K. C. Pant (1931–2012); MP for Nainital	27 June 1970	18 March 1971	3 years, 135 days	Indian National Congress (R)	Indira I	Indira Gandhi
7		K. C. Pant (1931–2012); MP for Nainital	18 March 1971	9 November 1973	3 years, 135 days	Indian National Congress (R)	Indira II	Indira Gandhi
8		Om Mehta (1927–1995); MP for Jammu and Kashmir (Personnel and Administrative Reforms)	10 October 1974	24 March 1977	2 years, 165 days	Indian National Congress (R)	Indira II	Indira Gandhi
9		S. D. Patil; MP for Erandol	14 August 1977	28 July 1979	1 year, 348 days	Janata Party	Desai	Morarji Desai
10		Dhanik Lal Mandal (1932–2022); MP for Jhanjharpur	14 August 1977	15 July 1979	2 years, 153 days	Janata Party	Desai	Morarji Desai
10		Dhanik Lal Mandal (1932–2022); MP for Jhanjharpur	30 July 1979	14 January 1980	2 years, 153 days	Janata Party (Secular)	Charan	Charan Singh
11		Pendekanti Venkatasubbaiah (1921–1993); MP for Nandyal	14 January 1980	31 October 1984	4 years, 291 days	Indian National Congress (I)	Indira III	Indira Gandhi
12		Yogendra Makwana (1933–2025); MP for Gujarat (Rajya Sabha)	14 January 1980	15 January 1982	2 years, 1 day	Indian National Congress (I)	Indira III	Indira Gandhi
13		Nihar Ranjan Laskar (born 1932); MP for Karimganj	15 January 1982	7 February 1984	2 years, 23 days	Indian National Congress (I)	Indira III	Indira Gandhi
14		Ram Dulari Sinha (1922–1994); MP for Sheohar	7 February 1984	31 October 1984	267 days	Indian National Congress (I)	Indira III	Indira Gandhi
(11)		Pendekanti Venkatasubbaiah (1921–1993); MP for Nandyal	4 November 1984	31 December 1984	57 days	Indian National Congress (I)	Rajiv I	Rajiv Gandhi
(14)		Ram Dulari Sinha (1922–1994); MP for Sheohar	4 November 1984	31 December 1984	325 days	Indian National Congress (I)	Rajiv I	Rajiv Gandhi
(14)		Ram Dulari Sinha (1922–1994); MP for Sheohar	31 December 1984	25 September 1985	325 days	Indian National Congress (I)	Rajiv II	Rajiv Gandhi
15		Arif Mohammad Khan (born 1951); MP for Bahraich	12 August 1985	25 September 1985	44 days	Indian National Congress (I)	Rajiv II	Rajiv Gandhi
16		P. A. Sangma (1947–2016); MP for Tura (States)	25 September 1985	20 January 1986	117 days	Indian National Congress (I)	Rajiv II	Rajiv Gandhi
17		Arun Nehru (1944–2013); MP for Raebareli (Internal Security)	25 September 1985	20 January 1986	117 days	Indian National Congress (I)	Rajiv II	Rajiv Gandhi
(6)		Ram Niwas Mirdha (1924–2010); MP for Rajasthan (Rajya Sabha)	14 March 1986	14 June 1986	0 days	Indian National Congress (I)	Rajiv II	Rajiv Gandhi
18		Ghulam Nabi Azad (born 1949); MP for Washim (States)	12 May 1986	22 October 1986	163 days	Indian National Congress (I)	Rajiv II	Rajiv Gandhi
19		P. Chidambaram (born 1945); MP for Sivaganga	24 June 1986	2 December 1989	3 years, 161 days	Indian National Congress (I)	Rajiv II	Rajiv Gandhi
20		Chintamani Panigrahi (1922–2000); MP for Bhubaneswar	22 October 1986	25 June 1988	1 year, 247 days	Indian National Congress (I)	Rajiv II	Rajiv Gandhi
21		Santosh Mohan Dev (1934–2017); MP for Silchar (Internal Security)	25 June 1988	2 December 1989	1 year, 160 days		Rajiv II	Rajiv Gandhi
22		Subodh Kant Sahay (born 1951); MP for Ranchi	23 April 1990	5 November 1990	196 days	Janata Dal	Vishwanath	Vishwanath Pratap Singh
22		Subodh Kant Sahay (born 1951); MP for Ranchi	21 November 1990	21 June 1991	228 days	Samajwadi Janata Party (Rashtriya)	Chandra Shekhar	Chandra Shekhar
23		M. M. Jacob (1926–2018); MP for Kerala (Rajya Sabha)	21 June 1991	17 January 1993	1 year, 210 days	Indian National Congress (I)	Rao	P. V. Narasimha Rao
24		Rajesh Pilot (1945–2000); MP for Dausa (Internal Security)	18 January 1993	15 September 1995	2 years, 240 days	Indian National Congress (I)	Rao	P. V. Narasimha Rao
25		P. M. Sayeed (1941–2005); MP for Lakshadweep	19 January 1993	15 September 1995	2 years, 239 days	Indian National Congress (I)	Rao	P. V. Narasimha Rao
26		Syed Sibtey Razi (1939–2022); MP for Uttar Pradesh (Rajya Sabha)	15 September 1995	16 May 1996	244 days	Indian National Congress (I)	Rao	P. V. Narasimha Rao
27		Ram Lal Rahi (1934–2020); MP for Misrikh	15 September 1995	16 May 1996	244 days	Indian National Congress (I)	Rao	P. V. Narasimha Rao
28		Meijinlung Kamson (born 1939); MP for Outer Manipur	15 September 1995	16 May 1996	244 days	Indian National Congress (I)	Rao	P. V. Narasimha Rao
29		Mohammed Taslimuddin (1943–2017); MP for Kishanganj	1 June 1996	9 June 1996	8 days	Janata Dal	Deve Gowda	H. D. Deve Gowda
30		Maqbool Dar (1943–2008); MP for Anantnag	10 July 1996	21 April 1997	285 days	Janata Dal	Deve Gowda	H. D. Deve Gowda
30		Maqbool Dar (1943–2008); MP for Anantnag	1 May 1997	19 March 1998	322 days	Janata Dal	Gujral	Inder Kumar Gujral
31		Ram Naik (born 1934); MP for Mumbai North	5 May 1999	13 October 1999	161 days	Bharatiya Janata Party	Vajpayee II	Atal Bihari Vajpayee
32		I. D. Swami (1929–2019); MP for Karnal	13 October 1999	22 May 2004	4 years, 222 days	Bharatiya Janata Party	Vajpayee III	Atal Bihari Vajpayee
33		C. Vidyasagar Rao (born 1941); MP for Karimnagar	13 October 1999	29 January 2003	3 years, 108 days	Bharatiya Janata Party	Vajpayee III	Atal Bihari Vajpayee
34		Harin Pathak (born 1947); MP for Ahmedabad East	29 January 2003	22 May 2004	1 year, 114 days	Bharatiya Janata Party	Vajpayee III	Atal Bihari Vajpayee
35		Chinmayanand Swami (born 1947); MP for Jaunpur	24 May 2003	22 May 2004	364 days	Bharatiya Janata Party	Vajpayee III	Atal Bihari Vajpayee
36		Manikrao Hodlya Gavit (1934–2022); MP for Nandurbar	23 May 2004	6 April 2007	2 years, 318 days	Indian National Congress	Manmohan I	Manmohan Singh
37		Shriprakash Jaiswal (1944–2025); MP for Kanpur	23 May 2004	22 May 2009	4 years, 364 days	Indian National Congress	Manmohan I	Manmohan Singh
38		S. Regupathy (born 1950); MP for Pudukkottai	23 May 2004	15 May 2007	2 years, 357 days	Dravida Munnetra Kazhagam	Manmohan I	Manmohan Singh
38		V. Radhika Selvi (born 1976); MP for Tiruchendur	18 May 2007	22 May 2009	2 years, 4 days	Dravida Munnetra Kazhagam	Manmohan I	Manmohan Singh
39		Shakeel Ahmad (born 1956); MP for Madhubani	6 April 2008	22 May 2009	1 year, 46 days	Indian National Congress	Manmohan I	Manmohan Singh
40		Mullappally Ramachandran (born 1944); MP for Vatakara	28 May 2009	26 May 2014	4 years, 363 days	Indian National Congress	Manmohan II	Manmohan Singh
41		Ajay Maken (born 1964); MP for New Delhi	28 May 2009	19 January 2011	1 year, 236 days	Indian National Congress	Manmohan II	Manmohan Singh
42		Gurudas Kamat (1954–2018); MP for Mumbai North West	19 January 2011	12 July 2011	174 days	Indian National Congress	Manmohan II	Manmohan Singh
43		Jitendra Singh (born 1971); MP for Alwar	12 July 2011	28 October 2012	1 year, 108 days	Indian National Congress	Manmohan II	Manmohan Singh
44		R. P. N. Singh (born 1964); MP for Kushi Nagar	28 October 2012	26 May 2014	1 year, 210 days	Indian National Congress	Manmohan II	Manmohan Singh
45		Kiren Rijiju (born 1971); MP for Arunachal West	26 May 2014	30 May 2019	5 years, 4 days	Bharatiya Janata Party	Modi I	Narendra Modi
46		Haribhai Parthibhai Chaudhary (born 1954); MP for Banaskantha	9 November 2014	5 July 2016	1 year, 239 days	Bharatiya Janata Party	Modi I	Narendra Modi
47		Hansraj Gangaram Ahir (born 1954); MP for Chandrapur	5 July 2016	30 May 2019	2 years, 329 days	Bharatiya Janata Party	Modi I	Narendra Modi
48		G. Kishan Reddy (born 1964); MP for Secunderabad	30 May 2019	7 July 2021	2 years, 37 days	Bharatiya Janata Party	Modi II	Narendra Modi
49		Nityanand Rai (born 1966); MP for Ujiarpur	30 May 2019	9 June 2024	5 years, 9 days	Bharatiya Janata Party	Modi II	Narendra Modi
50		Ajay Mishra Teni (born 1960); MP for Kheri	7 July 2021	9 June 2024	2 years, 338 days	Bharatiya Janata Party	Modi II	Narendra Modi
51		Nisith Pramanik (born 1986); MP for Cooch Behar	7 July 2021	9 June 2024	2 years, 338 days	Bharatiya Janata Party	Modi II	Narendra Modi
(49)		Nityanand Rai (born 1966); MP for Ujiarpur	9 June 2024	Incumbent	2 years, 156 days	Bharatiya Janata Party	Modi III	Narendra Modi
52		Bandi Sanjay Kumar (born 1971); MP for Karimnagar	9 June 2024	Incumbent	2 years, 156 days	Bharatiya Janata Party	Modi III	Narendra Modi

== Deputy ministers ==
No.	Portrait	Minister (birth-death) Constituency	Term of office			Political party	Ministry	Prime Minister
No.	Portrait	Minister (birth-death) Constituency	From	To	Period	Political party	Ministry	Prime Minister
1		B. N. Datar (1894–1963); MP for Belgaum North	12 August 1952	14 February 1956	3 years, 186 days	Indian National Congress	Nehru II	Jawaharlal Nehru
2		Violet Alva (1909–1969); MP for Bombay (Rajya Sabha)	23 April 1957	10 April 1962	4 years, 352 days	Indian National Congress	Nehru III	Jawaharlal Nehru
3		Maragatham Chandrasekar (1917–2001); MP for Sriperumbudur	8 May 1962	27 May 1964	2 years, 19 days	Indian National Congress	Nehru IV	Jawaharlal Nehru
4		Lalit Narayan Mishra (1923–1975); MP for Bihar (Rajya Sabha)	26 February 1964	27 May 1964	91 days	Indian National Congress	Nehru IV	Jawaharlal Nehru
(3)		Maragatham Chandrasekar (1917–2001); MP for Sriperumbudur	27 May 1964	9 June 1964	13 days	Indian National Congress	Nanda I	Gulzarilal Nanda
(4)		Lalit Narayan Mishra (1923–1975); MP for Bihar (Rajya Sabha)	27 May 1964	9 June 1964	1 year, 242 days	Indian National Congress	Nanda I	Gulzarilal Nanda
(4)		Lalit Narayan Mishra (1923–1975); MP for Bihar (Rajya Sabha)	9 June 1964	11 January 1966	1 year, 242 days	Indian National Congress	Shastri	Lal Bahadur Shastri
(4)		Lalit Narayan Mishra (1923–1975); MP for Bihar (Rajya Sabha)	11 January 1966	24 January 1966	1 year, 242 days	Indian National Congress	Nanda II	Gulzarilal Nanda
5		Purnendu Sekhar Naskar (1921-1993); MP for Mathurapur	24 January 1966	13 March 1967	1 year, 48 days	Indian National Congress	Indira I	Indira Gandhi
6		Vidya Charan Shukla (1929–2013); MP for Mahasamund	14 February 1966	13 March 1967	1 year, 27 days	Indian National Congress	Indira I	Indira Gandhi
7		K. S. Ramaswamy (1922–2004); MP for Madras (Rajya Sabha)	18 March 1967	18 March 1971	4 years, 0 days	Indian National Congress	Indira II	Indira Gandhi
8		Fakruddinsab Hussensab Mohsin (1923–1996); MP for Dharwad South	2 May 1971	24 March 1977	5 years, 326 days	Indian National Congress (R)	Indira III	Indira Gandhi
9		Ram Lal Rahi (1934–2020); MP for Misrikh	21 June 1991	15 September 1995	4 years, 86 days	Indian National Congress (I)	Rao	P. V. Narasimha Rao
Position not in use since 1995

== Length of Tenure ==
=== List by length of tenure ===
#	Home Minister	Party	Length of term	
#	Home Minister	Party	Longest continuous term	Total tenure
1	Amit Shah	BJP	7 years, 167 days	7 years, 167 days
2	L K Advani	BJP	6 years, 64 days	6 years, 64 days
3	Govind Vallabh Pant	INC	6 years, 56 days	6 years, 56 days
4	Shankarao Chavan	INC	4 years, 330 days	6 years, 36 days
5	Rajnath Singh	BJP	5 years, 4 days	5 years, 4 days
