= 2004 Karnataka Legislative Assembly election =

- 20, 24 April 2004

All 224 Legislative Assembly seats 113 seats needed for a majority
- Turnout: 65.17 pp (▼2.48 pp)
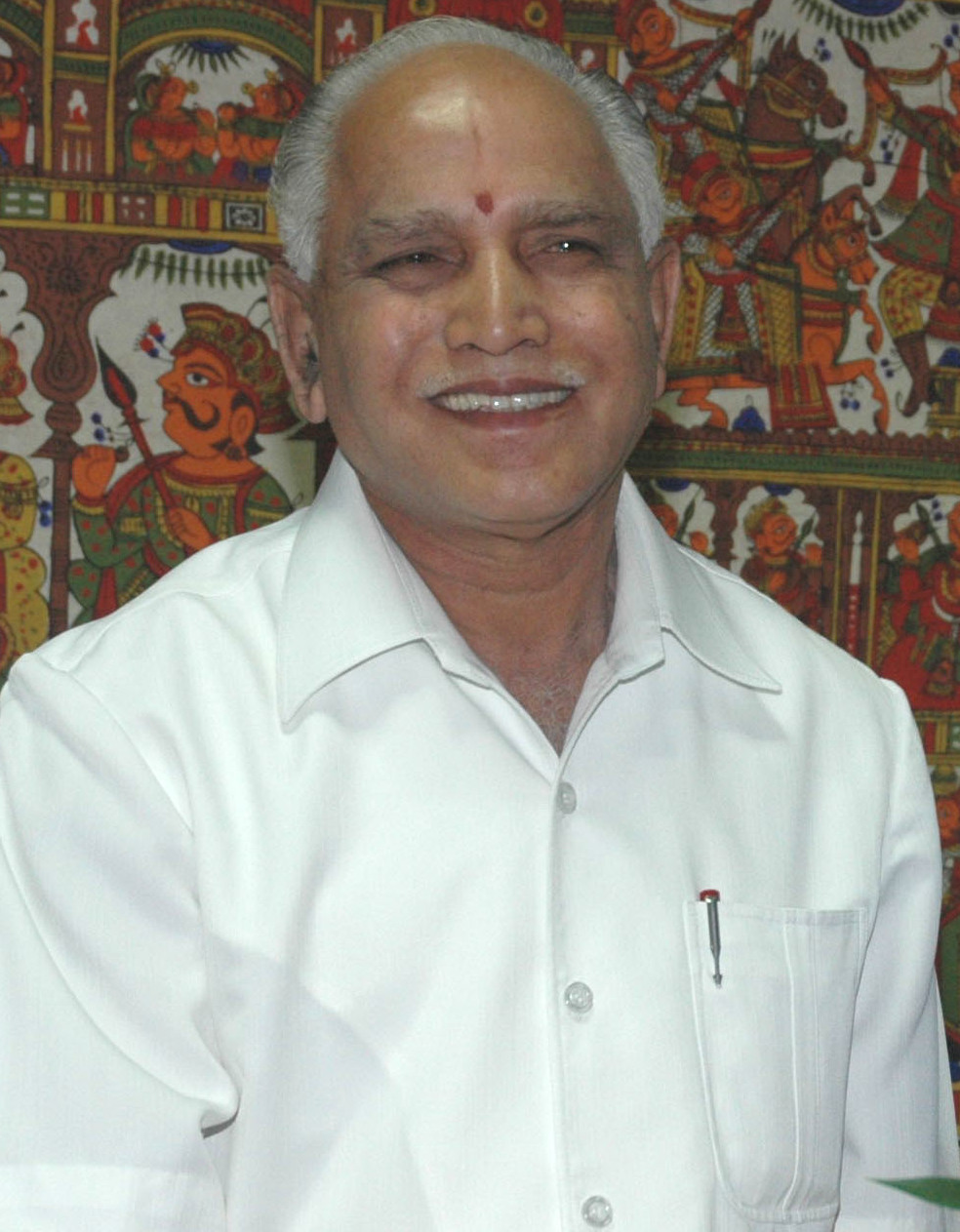

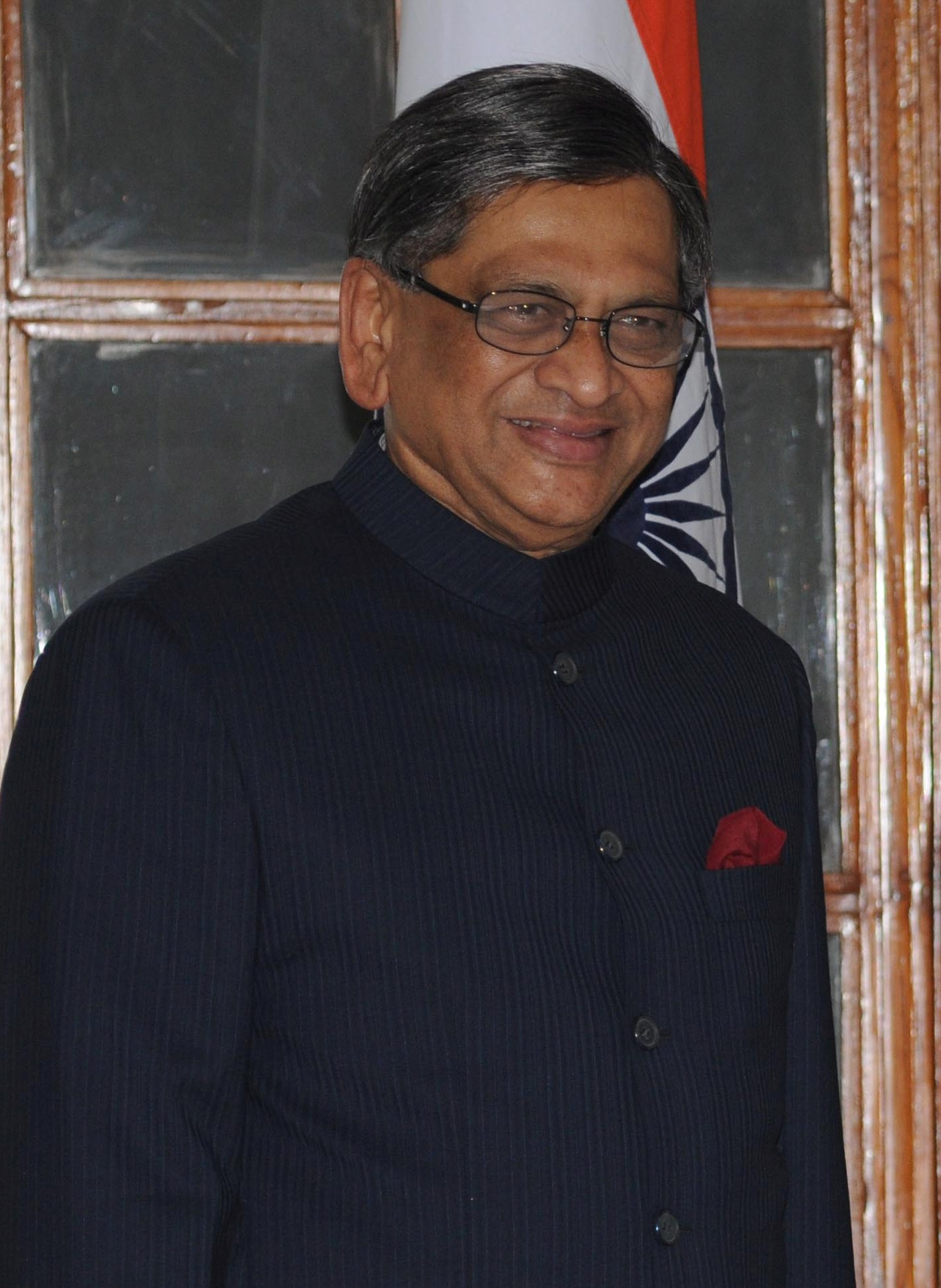

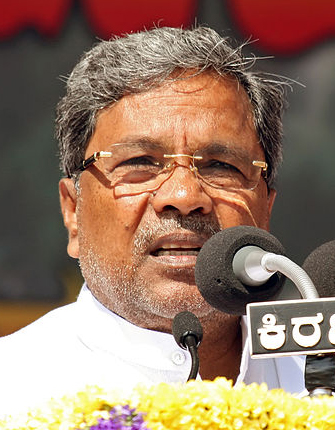
	Majority party	Minority party	Third party
Leader	B. S. Yeddyurappa	S. M. Krishna	Siddaramaiah
Party	BJP	INC	JD(S)
Alliance	NDA	INC+ (post poll UPA)	N/A
Leader since	1984	1999	1999
Leader's seat	Shikaripura	Chamrajpet	Chamundeshwari
Last election	44	132	10
Seats won	79	65	58
Seat change	▲35	▼67	▲48
Popular vote	71,18,658	88,61,959	52,20,129
Percentage	28.33%	35.27%	20.77%
Swing	▲7.64 pp	▼5.57 pp	▲10.42 pp
Chief Minister before election
S. M. Krishna
INC
Elected Chief Minister
Dharam Singh
INC

The 2004 Karnataka Legislative Assembly election took place on 20 April and 26 April 2004 in 224 constituencies in Karnataka, India. The elections were conducted to elect the government in the state of Karnataka for the next five years. The votes were counted on 13 May 2004. None of the parties were able to win a majority, and the Bharatiya Janata Party emerged as the single largest party, with 79 seats. Subsequently, the Indian National Congress with 65 members and Janata Dal (Secular) with 58 members formed a coalition to run the government with Dharam Singh as the chief minister. This was the first ever coalition government in the state.

== Background ==
in 1999 election, Indian National Congress secured a majority by winning 132 seats out of 224 seats in the assembly, after which S. M. Krishna became the chief minister of Karnataka, and Bharatiya Janata Party becoming the opposition party for the second time, securing 44 seats. Tthe two factions of the Janata Dal, Janata Dal (United) led by outgoing Chief Minister J. H. Patel, and Janata Dal (Secular) led by former Prime Minister of India H. D. Deve Gowda, secured 18 and 10 seats respectively.

== Schedule ==
The schedule of the election was announced by the Election Commission of India on 29 February 2004.

Poll event	Phase	
Poll event	1	2
Date of announcement	29 February 2004	
Notification date	24 March 2004	31 March 2004
Last date for filing nomination	31 March 2004	7 April 2004
Scrutiny of nomination	2 April 2004	8 April 2004
Last date for withdrawal of nomination	5 April 2004	10 April 2004
Date of poll	20 April 2004	26 April 2004
Date of counting of votes	13 May 2004	
No. of constituencies	120	104

== Parties and alliances ==
=== National Democratic Alliance ===
Party	Flag	Symbol	Leader	Contesting seats
Bharatiya Janata Party			B. S. Yediyurappa	198
Janata Dal (United)				26

=== United Progressive Alliance ===
Party	Flag	Symbol	Leader	Contesting seats
Indian National Congress			S. M. Krishna	224

=== Janata Dal (Secular) ===
Party	Flag	Symbol	Leader	Contesting seats
Janata Dal (Secular)			H. D. Deve Gowda	220

== Results ==
=== Party-wise ===
Parties	Popular vote			Seats		
Parties	Votes	%	+pp	Contested	Won	+/-
Bharatiya Janata Party	71,18,658	28.33	▲7.64	198	79	▲35
Indian National Congress	88,61,959	35.27	▼5.57	224	65	▼67
Janata Dal (Secular)	52,20,121	20.77	▲10.35	220	58	▲48
Janata Dal (United)	5,17,904	2.06	▼11.47	26	5	▼13
Independent	17,24,480	6.86	▼5.14	405	13	▼6
Others	17,02,468	6.71	▲4.19	642	4	▲3
Total	2,51,29,066	100.00		1715	224	±0
Valid votes	2,51,29,066	99.93				
Invalid votes	16,524	0.07				
Votes cast / turnout	2,51,45,590	65.17				
Abstentions	1,34,41,164	34.83				
Registered voters	3,85,86,754					

=== District wise results ===
District	Seats						
District	Seats	BJP	INC	JDS	JDU	IND	OTH
Bidar	6	2	1	2	—N/a	1	—N/a
Gulbarga	13	3	3	5	—N/a	1	1
Raichur	6	1	2	3	—N/a	—N/a	—N/a
Koppal	5	2	2	1	—N/a	—N/a	—N/a
Bellary	8	3	1	3	—N/a	1	—N/a
Davanagere	7	3	3	1	—N/a	—N/a	—N/a
Chitradurga	7	—N/a	5	1	1	—N/a	—N/a
Tumakuru	13	2	1	8	1	1	—N/a
Kolar	12	2	6	2	—N/a	—N/a	2
Bangalore Urban	16	6	10	—N/a	—N/a	—N/a	—N/a
Bangalore Rural	9	—N/a	5	4	—N/a	—N/a	—N/a
Mandya	9	—N/a	2	6	1	—N/a	—N/a
Chamarajanagar	5	—N/a	1	2	—N/a	1	1
Mysore	11	2	1	8	—N/a	—N/a	—N/a
Kodagu	3	2	1	—N/a	—N/a	—N/a	—N/a
Hassan	8	1	1	6	—N/a	—N/a	—N/a
Dakshina Kannada	9	7	2	—N/a	—N/a	—N/a	—N/a
Udupi	6	4	1	—N/a	—N/a	1	—N/a
Chikmagalur	6	3	1	2	—N/a	—N/a	—N/a
Shimoga	8	6	1	—N/a	—N/a	1	—N/a
Uttara Kannada	6	4	2	—N/a	—N/a	—N/a	—N/a
Dharwad	7	3	2	—N/a	1	1	—N/a
Haveri	6	4	—N/a	1	—N/a	1	—N/a
Gadag	5	2	3	—N/a	—N/a	—N/a	—N/a
Belagavi	18	8	5	1	1	3	—N/a
Bagalkot	7	6	—N/a	1	—N/a	—N/a	—N/a
Bijapur	8	3	3	1	—N/a	1	—N/a
Total	224	79	65	58	5	13	4

=== Successful candidates ===
District	Constituency		Winner				Runner up				Margin	%
District	#	Name	Candidate	Party	Votes	%	Candidate	Party	Votes	%	Margin	%
Bidar	1	Aurad	Gurupadappa Nagamarapalli	INC	45,621	41.60	Gundappa Vakil	JD(S)	34,300	31.27	11,321	10.33
Bidar	2	Bhalki	Prakash Khandre	BJP	52,652	52.01	Eshwara Khandre	INC	42,711	42.19	9,941	9.82
Bidar	3	Hulsoor (SC)	Rajendra Varma	BJP	29,285	34.00	Babu Honnanaik	IND	27,850	32.33	1,435	1.67
Bidar	4	Bidar	Bandeppa Kashempur	IND	67,019	49.37	Syed Zulfikar Hashmi	IND	39,784	29.31	27,235	20.06
Bidar	5	Humnabad	Merajuddin Patel	JD(S)	35,755	33.95	Rajashekar Patil	INC	33,586	31.89	2,169	2.06
Bidar	6	Basavakalyan	Mallikarjun Khuba	JD(S)	29,557	27.15	Basavaraj Patil Attur	IND	22,132	20.33	7,425	6.82
Gulbarga	7	Chincholi	Vaijnath Patil	JD(S)	36,184	39.07	Kailasnath Patil	INC	31,067	33.54	5,117	5.53
Gulbarga	8	Kamalapur (SC)	Revu Naik Belamgi	BJP	28,607	37.30	G. Ramakrishna	INC	23,740	30.95	4,867	6.35
Gulbarga	9	Alland	B. R. Patil	JD(S)	50,818	54.55	Subhash Guttedar	INC	35,989	38.63	14,829	15.92
Gulbarga	10	Gulbarga	Dattatraya C. Patil Revoor	BJP	78,845	48.59	Qamar ul Islam	INC	74,645	46.00	4,200	2.59
Gulbarga	11	Shahabad (SC)	Sunil Vallyapure	BJP	32,625	30.41	R. B. Chavan	INC	31,607	29.46	1,018	0.95
Gulbarga	12	Afzalpur	M. Y. Patil	JD(S)	53,122	52.42	Malikayya Guttedar	INC	34,654	34.20	18,468	18.22
Gulbarga	13	Chitapur	Vishwanath Patil Hebbal	JD(S)	40,871	47.96	Baburao Chinchansur	INC	23,921	28.07	16,950	19.89
Gulbarga	14	Sedam	Sharan Prakash Patil	INC	26,424	27.82	Chandrashekar Deshmukh	JD(S)	23,413	24.65	3,011	3.17
Gulbarga	15	Jewargi	Dharamsingh	INC	45,235	43.52	Shivalingappa Patil Naribol	BJP	42,504	40.90	2,731	2.62
Gulbarga	16	Gurmitkal (SC)	Mallikarjun Kharge	INC	37,006	45.99	Akaashi Basavaraj	JD(S)	18,459	22.94	18,547	23.05
Gulbarga	17	Yadgir	Veer Basawanthreddy Mudnal	IND	37,222	40.79	Dr. A. B. Malakraddy	INC	25,788	28.26	11,434	12.53
Gulbarga	18	Shahapur	S. Darshanapur	JD(S)	59,310	51.00	S. Shivashekarappagouda	INC	38,080	32.75	21,230	18.25
Gulbarga	19	Shorapur	Narasimha Nayak	KNP	43,608	38.63	Raja Venkatappa Naik	INC	40,733	36.08	2,875	2.55
Raichur	20	Deodurg (SC)	Alkod Hanumanthappa	JD(S)	33,460	38.47	Manappa	IND	20,125	23.14	13,335	15.33
Raichur	21	Raichur	Ahuja Papareddy	BJP	38,784	36.51	Syed Yasin	INC	29,188	27.48	9,596	9.03
Raichur	22	Kalmala	Muniyappa Muddappa B.	JD(S)	30,915	28.53	Shankaragouda Harvi	BJP	27,444	25.33	3,471	3.20
Raichur	23	Manvi	Bosuraju N. S.	INC	38,620	38.75	Basavanagouda Byagawat	IND	28,513	28.61	10,107	10.14
Raichur	24	Lingsugur	Amaregowda Patil Bayyapur	JD(S)	49,211	46.94	Anwari Basavaraj Patil	INC	45,692	43.58	3,519	3.36
Raichur	25	Sindhnoor	Badarli Hampanagouda	INC	79,001	55.26	H. Amareshappagouda	JD(S)	30,277	21.18	48,724	34.08
Koppal	26	Kushtagi	D. H. Patil	BJP	44,492	39.93	K. Sharanappa Vakeelaru	JD(S)	34,526	30.99	9,966	8.94
Koppal	27	Yelburga	Basavaraj Rayareddy	INC	49,401	47.30	Eshanna Gulagannavar	BJP	43,729	41.87	5,672	5.43
Koppal	28	Kanakagiri	Veerappa D. Kesarahatti	BJP	46,712	41.91	M. Mallikarjuna Nagappa	INC	41,136	36.91	5,576	5.00
Koppal	29	Gangavathi	Ikbal Ansari	JD(S)	39,486	34.52	H. Giregouda Advocate	BJP	36,044	31.51	3,442	3.01
Koppal	30	Koppal	K. Basavaraj Bhimappa Hitnal	INC	47,228	42.83	Karadi Sanganna Amarappa	BJP	41,880	37.98	5,348	4.85
Bellary	31	Siruguppa	M. S. Somalingappa	BJP	49,160	34.77	T. M. Chedrashekaraiah	JD(S)	42,844	30.30	6,316	4.47
Bellary	32	Kurugodu	N. Suryanarayana Reddy	JD(S)	56,517	42.20	K. A. Ramalingappa	BJP	37,246	27.81	19,271	14.39
Bellary	33	Bellary	B. Sreeramula	BJP	53,354	47.29	M. Diwakara Babu	INC	46,643	41.34	6,711	5.95
Bellary	34	Hospet	H. R. Gaviappa	IND	31,440	28.15	G. Shankara Goud	BJP	23,737	21.25	7,703	6.90
Bellary	35	Sandur	Santhosh Lad	JD(S)	65,600	56.16	Venkatarao Ghorpade	INC	30,056	25.73	35,544	30.43
Bellary	36	Kudligi	H. Anil Lad	BJP	58,977	48.88	Siraj Sheikh	INC	41,796	34.64	17,181	14.24
Bellary	37	Kottur	T. Bhagirathi	INC	29,593	27.37	N. T. Bommanna	JD(S)	26,781	24.77	2,812	2.60
Bellary	38	Hadagalli	M. P. Prakash	JD(S)	61,863	55.06	V. B. Halappa	INC	28,077	24.99	33,786	30.07
Davanagere	39	Harapanahalli (SC)	P. T. Parameshwara Naik	INC	38,158	36.34	D. Narayana Das	IND	30,164	28.73	7,994	7.61
Davanagere	40	Harihar	Y. Nagappa	INC	40,366	33.23	H. Shivappa	JD(S)	39,797	32.76	569	0.47
Davanagere	41	Davangere	Shamanur Shivashankarappa	INC	63,499	56.74	Yashawantha Rao	BJP	41,366	36.96	22,133	19.78
Davanagere	42	Mayakonda	S. A. Ravindranath	BJP	62,290	48.33	R. S. Shekharappa	INC	53,193	41.27	9,097	7.06
Chitradurga	43	Bharamasagara (SC)	H. Anjaneya	JD(U)	47,673	45.43	M. Chandrappa	INC	31,104	29.64	16,569	15.79
Chitradurga	44	Chitradurga	G. H. Thippa Reddy	INC	53,386	45.16	S. K. Basavarajan	JD(S)	51,420	43.50	1,966	1.66
Davanagere	45	Jagalur	T. Gurusiddanagowda	BJP	38,530	36.43	G. H. Ashwatha Reddy	INC	31,767	30.03	6,763	6.40
Chitradurga	46	Molakalmuru	N. Y. Gopal Krishna	INC	33,592	29.48	Patel G. M. Thippeswamy	JD(U)	27,155	23.83	6,437	5.65
Chitradurga	47	Challakere	D. Sudhakar	INC	47,550	39.96	Basavaraj Mandi Mutt	BJP	20,199	16.98	27,351	22.98
Chitradurga	48	Hiriyur (SC)	D. Manjunath	JD(S)	43,749	43.41	G. S. Manjunath	INC	31,310	31.06	12,439	12.35
Chitradurga	49	Holalkere	A. V. Umapathi	INC	48,179	43.23	G. S. Manjunath	IND	33,836	30.36	14,343	12.87
Chitradurga	50	Hosadurga	B. G. Govindappa	INC	49,780	41.73	Elkal Vijaya Kumar	JD(S)	29,052	24.35	20,728	17.38
Tumakuru	51	Pavagada (SC)	K. M. Thimmarayappa	JD(S)	53,136	39.69	Venkataramanappa	INC	45,058	33.65	8,078	6.04
Tumakuru	52	Sira	B. Sathyanarayana	JD(S)	33,166	30.86	Sreenivasaiah	INC	25,073	23.33	8,093	7.53
Tumakuru	53	Kallambella	K. S. Kiran Kumar	BJP	50,108	47.19	T. B. Jayachandra	INC	32,873	30.96	17,235	16.23
Tumakuru	54	Bellavi	K. N. Rajanna	JD(S)	35,099	31.07	C. V. Mahadevaiah	BJP	33,595	29.74	1,504	1.33
Tumakuru	55	Madhugiri (SC)	Dr. G. Parameshwara	INC	47,039	42.30	H. Kenchamaraiah	JD(S)	29,826	26.82	17,213	15.48
Tumakuru	56	Koratagere	Channigappa	JD(S)	41,826	35.58	Veeranna	JD(U)	38,832	33.04	2,994	2.54
Tumakuru	57	Tumkur	S. Shivanna	BJP	59,977	41.53	S. Shafi Ahmed	INC	51,332	35.54	8,645	5.99
Tumakuru	58	Kunigal	H. Ningappa	JD(S)	52,370	46.31	S. P. Muddahanumegowda	INC	33,280	29.43	19,090	16.88
Tumakuru	59	Huliyurdurga	D. Nagarajaya	JD(S)	27,848	32.71	Anusuyamma	BJP	23,106	27.14	4,742	5.57
Tumakuru	60	Gubbi	S. R. Sreenivasa	IND	40,431	38.57	G. S. Shivanjappa	JD(S)	28,854	27.53	11,577	11.04
Tumakuru	61	Turuvekere	M. T. Krishnappa	JD(S)	39,934	38.95	M. D. Lakshmi Narayana	BJP	30,776	30.01	9,158	8.94
Tumakuru	62	Tiptur	B. Nanjamari	JD(S)	46,996	44.84	K. Shadakshari	INC	30,173	28.79	16,823	16.05
Tumakuru	63	Chiknaikanahalli	J. C. Madhuswamy	JD(U)	43,040	44.74	C. B. Suresh Babu	JD(S)	41,412	43.05	1,628	1.69
Kolar	64	Gowribidanur	N. H. Shivashankara Reddy	INC	49,636	43.73	N. Jyothi Reddy	JD(S)	41,611	36.66	8,025	7.07
Kolar	65	Chikballapur (SC)	S. M. Muniyappa	INC	45,993	41.36	M. Shivananda	JD(S)	35,613	32.03	10,380	9.33
Kolar	66	Sidlaghatta	S. Munishamappa	JD(S)	60,322	49.85	V. Muniyappa	INC	52,875	43.70	7,447	6.15
Kolar	67	Bagepalli	G. V. Sreeramareddy	CPI(M)	57,132	52.01	N. Sampangi	INC	45,997	41.87	11,135	10.14
Kolar	68	Chintamani	Dr. M. C. Sudhakar	INC	65,256	51.17	K. M. Krishna Reddy	BJP	57,156	44.81	8,100	6.36
Kolar	69	Srinivasapur	K. R. Ramesh Kumar	INC	65,041	52.70	G. K. Venkatashiva Reddy	BJP	56,431	45.72	8,610	6.98
Kolar	70	Mulbagal	R. Srinivas	JD(S)	48,250	37.92	Y. Surendra	BJP	32,772	25.76	15,478	12.16
Kolar	71	Kolar Gold Fields (SC)	S. Rajendran	RPI	23,098	42.84	Bhakthavathsalam	ADMK	13,991	25.95	9,107	16.89
Kolar	72	Bethamangala (SC)	B. P. Venkatamuniyappa	BJP	41,117	33.54	M. Narayana Swamy	IND	40,570	33.09	547	0.45
Kolar	73	Kolar	K. Srinivasa Gowda	INC	54,755	48.69	M. S. Anand	BJP	31,004	27.57	23,751	21.12
Kolar	74	Vemgal	Krishna Byre Gowda	INC	95,563	75.73	S. N. Srirama	BJP	20,204	16.01	75,359	59.72
Kolar	75	Malur	S. N. Krishnaiah Setty	BJP	69,120	59.44	Nagaraju A.	INC	42,264	36.35	26,856	23.09
Bangalore Urban	76	Malleswaram	M. R. Seetharam	INC	47,029	52.40	Dr. C. N. Ashwath Narayan	BJP	37,252	41.51	9,777	10.89
Bangalore Urban	77	Rajajinagar	N. L. Narendra Babu	INC	67,899	46.86	S. Suresh Kumar	BJP	63,777	44.02	4,122	2.84
Bangalore Urban	78	Gandhi Nagar	Dinesh Gundu Rao	INC	40,797	66.65	Nagaraj V.	JD(S)	12,529	20.47	28,268	46.18
Bangalore Urban	79	Chickpet	P. C. Mohan	BJP	21,404	47.10	M. Sathya Narayana Swamy	INC	19,167	42.18	2,237	4.92
Bangalore Urban	80	Binnypet	V. Somanna	INC	77,657	42.68	Ashwathnarayana	BJP	50,737	27.88	26,920	14.80
Bangalore Urban	81	Chamarajapet	S. M. Krishna	INC	27,695	57.92	Mukhya Mantri Chandru	BJP	14,010	29.30	13,685	28.62
Bangalore Urban	82	Basavanagudi	K. Chandrashekhar	INC	44,600	50.57	K. N. Subbareddy	BJP	36,280	41.14	8,320	9.43
Bangalore Urban	83	Jayanagar	Ramalinga Reddy	INC	54,078	38.72	V. N. Vijayakumar	BJP	51,428	36.82	2,650	1.90
Bangalore Urban	84	Shanthinagar (SC)	S. Raghu	BJP	33,483	45.33	Muniswami M.	INC	30,005	40.62	3,478	4.71
Bangalore Urban	85	Shivajinagar	Katta Subramanya Naidu	BJP	22,001	51.44	N. A. Haris	INC	17,628	41.21	4,373	10.23
Bangalore Urban	86	Bharathinagar	Nirmal Surana	BJP	27,867	44.22	Alexander J.	INC	22,986	36.48	4,881	7.74
Bangalore Urban	87	Jayamahal	Roshan Baig	INC	41,757	46.92	Prof. Dr. Mumtaz Ali Khan	BJP	21,877	24.58	19,880	22.34
Bangalore Urban	88	Yelahanka (SC)	B. Prasanna Kumar	INC	1,44,806	45.27	Munikrishna C.	BJP	1,30,494	40.79	14,312	4.48
Bangalore Urban	89	Uttarahalli	R. Ashoka	BJP	3,13,309	45.38	S. T. Somashekhar	INC	2,29,308	33.22	84,001	12.16
Bangalore Urban	90	Varthur	A. Krishnappa	INC	1,27,490	49.52	Ashwatha Narayana Reddy	BJP	1,14,352	44.42	13,138	5.10
Bangalore Rural	91	Kanakapura	P. G. R. Sindhia	JD(S)	52,740	48.14	Narayana Gowda	INC	43,791	39.97	8,949	8.17
Bangalore Rural	92	Sathanur	D. K. Shivakumar	INC	51,603	47.91	D. M. Vishwanath	JD(S)	37,675	34.98	13,928	12.93
Bangalore Rural	93	Channapatna	C. P. Yogeeshwara	INC	64,162	53.26	M. C. Ashwath	JD(S)	47,993	39.84	16,169	13.42
Bangalore Rural	94	Ramanagaram	H. D. Kumaraswamy	JD(S)	69,554	54.15	Lingappa C. M.	INC	44,638	34.75	24,916	19.40
Bangalore Rural	95	Magadi	H. C. Balakrishna	JD(S)	49,197	41.19	H. M. Revanna	INC	37,921	31.75	11,276	9.44
Bangalore Rural	96	Nelamangala (SC)	Anjanamurthy	INC	37,578	32.21	Guruprasad B.	BJP	32,992	28.28	4,586	3.93
Bangalore Rural	97	Doddaballapur	J. Narasimhaswamy	INC	59,954	45.74	Krishnappa V.	JD(S)	46,898	35.78	13,056	9.96
Bangalore Rural	98	Devanahalli (SC)	Chandranna G.	JD(S)	61,344	42.19	Muninarasimhaiah	INC	34,000	23.38	27,344	18.81
Bangalore Rural	99	Hosakote	M. T. B. Nagaraju	INC	75,808	45.52	B. N. Bachegowda	JD(S)	74,973	45.02	835	0.50
Bangalore Urban	100	Anekal (SC)	A. Narayanaswamy	BJP	63,023	35.93	Shivanna B.	INC	60,847	34.69	2,176	1.24
Mandya	101	Nagamangala	N. Chaluvaraya Swamy	JD(S)	54,847	49.12	L. R. Shivarame Gowda	INC	48,760	43.67	6,087	5.45
Mandya	102	Maddur	D. C. Thammanna	INC	38,991	38.55	M. S. Siddaraju	IND	28,256	27.94	10,735	10.61
Mandya	103	Kiragaval	M. K. Nagamani	JD(U)	53,590	51.53	Madhu G. Madegowda	INC	38,029	36.57	15,561	14.96
Mandya	104	Malavalli (SC)	K. Annadani	JD(S)	38,860	38.68	P. M. Narendraswamy	INC	27,630	27.50	11,230	11.18
Mandya	105	Mandya	M. Srinivas	JD(S)	46,985	46.91	M. S. Atmananda	INC	32,105	32.06	14,880	14.85
Mandya	106	Keragodu	H. B. Ramu	INC	39,842	44.98	G. B. Shiva Kumar	JD(S)	27,366	30.90	12,476	14.08
Mandya	107	Srirangapatna	B. Vijayalakshmamma	JD(S)	27,371	24.32	K. S. Nanjundegowda	KRRS	26,113	23.20	1,258	1.12
Mandya	108	Pandavapura	C. S. Puttaraju	JD(S)	44,165	36.61	K. S. Puttannaiah	IND	42,649	35.35	1,516	1.26
Mandya	109	Krishnarajpet	Krishna	JD(S)	34,738	29.04	K. B. Chandrashekar	INC	29,324	24.51	5,414	4.53
Chamarajanagar	110	Hanur	Parimala Nagappa	JD(S)	61,626	52.65	R. Narendra	INC	48,613	41.53	13,013	11.12
Chamarajanagar	111	Kollegal (SC)	S. Balraj	IND	27,736	27.07	S. Jayanna	JD(S)	24,408	23.82	3,328	3.25
Mysore	112	Bannur	Sunitha Veerappa Gowda	BJP	33,522	34.00	Chikkamada Nayaka	INC	27,859	28.26	5,663	5.74
Mysore	113	T. Narasipur (SC)	Dr. H. C. Mahadevappa	JD(S)	37,956	37.61	M. Srinivasaiah	INC	23,699	23.48	14,257	14.13
Mysore	114	Krishnaraj	M. K. Somashekar	JD(S)	25,439	43.02	A. Ramdas	BJP	22,045	37.28	3,394	5.74
Mysore	115	Chamaraja	H. S. Shankaralingegowda	BJP	38,193	50.74	Sandesh Nagaraju	INC	23,416	31.11	14,777	19.63
Mysore	116	Narasimharaja	Tanveer Sait	INC	54,462	54.19	E. Maruthi Rao Pawar	JD(S)	29,853	29.71	24,609	24.48
Mysore	117	Chamundeswari	Siddaramaiah	JD(S)	90,727	43.44	L. Revanna Siddaiah	INC	58,382	27.95	32,345	15.49
Mysore	118	Nanjangud	D. T. Jayakumar	JD(S)	46,068	42.90	Mahadev M.	INC	26,483	24.66	19,585	18.24
Chamarajanagar	119	Santhemarahalli (SC)	R. Dhruvanarayana	INC	40,752	42.77	A. R. Krishnamurthy	JD(S)	40,751	42.77	1	0.00
Chamarajanagar	120	Chamarajanagar	Vatal Nagaraj	KCVP	37,072	32.04	Dr. Manjula B. P.	INC	26,589	22.98	10,483	9.06
Chamarajanagar	121	Gundlupet	H. S. Mahadeva Prasad	JD(S)	55,076	45.56	H. S. Nanjappa	INC	44,057	36.45	11,019	9.11
Mysore	122	Heggadadevanakote (SC)	M. P. Venkatesh	JD(S)	50,729	40.02	Nagaraju N.	BJP	38,412	30.30	12,317	9.72
Mysore	123	Hunsur	G. T. Deve Gowda	JD(S)	60,258	44.29	Chikkamadu S.	INC	46,126	33.90	14,132	10.39
Mysore	124	Krishnarajanagar	K. Mahadeva	JD(S)	40,341	35.32	H. Vishvanath	INC	40,018	35.04	323	0.28
Mysore	125	Periyapatna	K. Venkatesh	JD(S)	39,357	28.89	K. S. Chandre Gowda	INC	30,372	22.30	8,985	6.59
Kodagu	126	Virajpet (ST)	H. D. Basavaraju	BJP	35,550	51.48	Suma Vasanth	INC	27,484	39.80	8,066	11.68
Kodagu	127	Madikere	K. G. Bopaiah	BJP	31,610	37.61	S. Madappa Dambekodi	JD(S)	23,446	27.90	8,164	9.71
Kodagu	128	Somwarpet	B. A. Jivijaya	INC	46,560	44.27	Appachu Ranjan	BJP	43,763	41.61	2,797	2.66
Hassan	129	Belur (SC)	H. K. Kumaraswamy	JD(S)	31,438	33.28	Mallesh D.	INC	26,489	28.04	4,949	5.24
Hassan	130	Arsikere	A. S. Basavaraju	BJP	36,867	34.91	G. V. Siddappa	INC	30,418	28.81	6,449	6.10
Hassan	131	Gandsi	B. Shivaramu	INC	52,781	46.95	K. M. Shivalingegowda	JD(S)	52,763	46.94	18	0.01
Hassan	132	Shravanabelagola	G. S. Putte Gowda	JD(S)	70,461	52.90	H. S. Vijay Kumar	INC	35,585	26.72	34,876	26.18
Hassan	133	Holenarasipur	H. D. Revanna	JD(S)	64,664	53.57	G. Puttaswamy Gowda	INC	32,070	26.57	32,594	27.00
Hassan	134	Arkalgud	A. T. Ramaswamy	JD(S)	47,131	42.98	Manju A.	INC	44,192	40.30	2,939	2.68
Hassan	135	Hassan	H. S. Prakash	JD(S)	63,527	49.63	K. M. Rajegowda	INC	35,804	27.97	27,723	21.66
Hassan	136	Sakleshpur	H. M. Vishwanatha	JD(S)	41,704	38.33	B. B. Shivappa	INC	19,911	18.30	21,793	20.03
Dakshina Kannada	137	Sullia (SC)	Angara S.	BJP	61,480	52.95	Dr. B. Raghu	INC	44,395	38.24	17,085	14.71
Dakshina Kannada	138	Puttur	Shakunthala T. Shetty	BJP	65,119	50.85	N. Sudhakar Shetty	INC	54,007	42.18	11,112	8.67
Dakshina Kannada	139	Vittal	K. Padmanabha Kottari	BJP	60,250	48.01	K. M. Ibrahim	INC	59,859	47.70	391	0.31
Dakshina Kannada	140	Belthangady	K. Prabhakara Bangera	BJP	48,102	37.26	K. Harish Kumar	INC	35,281	27.33	12,821	9.93
Dakshina Kannada	141	Bantwal	B. Nagaraja Shetty	BJP	54,860	50.21	B. Ramanatha Rai	INC	48,934	44.79	5,926	5.42
Dakshina Kannada	142	Mangalore	N. Yogish Bhat	BJP	29,928	51.06	Lancelot Pinto	INC	24,827	42.36	5,101	8.70
Dakshina Kannada	143	Ullal	U. T. Fareed	INC	47,839	45.21	Chandrashekar Uchil	BJP	40,491	38.26	7,348	6.95
Dakshina Kannada	144	Surathkal	J. Krishna Palemar	BJP	57,808	48.71	K. Vijaya Kumar Shetty	INC	54,496	45.92	3,312	2.79
Udupi	145	Kaup	Lalaji R. Mendon	BJP	33,611	46.72	Vasanta V. Salian	INC	32,221	44.79	1,390	1.93
Udupi	146	Udupi	K. Raghupathy Bhat	BJP	36,341	38.92	U. R. Sabhapati	INC	34,808	37.27	1,533	1.65
Udupi	147	Brahmavar	K. Jayaprakash Hegde	IND	39,521	40.23	Pramod Madhwaraj	INC	27,348	27.84	12,173	12.39
Udupi	148	Coondapur	Halady Srinivasa Shetty	BJP	58,923	55.75	G. Ashok Kumar Hegde	INC	39,258	37.15	19,665	18.60
Udupi	149	Baindur	K. Gopala Poojary	INC	47,627	47.15	K. Lakshminarayana	BJP	44,375	43.93	3,252	3.22
Udupi	150	Karkal	V. Sunil Kumar	BJP	52,061	53.07	H. Gopala Bhandary	INC	42,266	43.09	9,795	9.98
Dakshina Kannada	151	Moodabidri	K. Abhayachandra	INC	29,926	36.32	K. Amarnath Shetty	JD(S)	26,977	32.74	2,949	3.58
Chikmagalur	152	Sringeri	D. N. Jeevaraj	BJP	47,263	45.97	D. B. Chandre Gowda	INC	29,042	28.25	18,221	17.72
Chikmagalur	153	Mudigere (SC)	M. P. Kumaraswamy	BJP	27,148	31.48	Motamma	INC	25,810	29.93	1,338	1.55
Chikmagalur	154	Chikmagalur	C. T. Ravi	BJP	57,165	58.09	C. R. Sageer Ahmed	INC	32,292	32.81	24,873	25.28
Chikmagalur	155	Birur	S. L. Dharme Gowda	JD(S)	33,164	34.59	K. B. Mallikarjuna	INC	32,031	33.41	1,133	1.18
Chikmagalur	156	Kadur	K. M. Krishnamurthy	JD(S)	43,433	43.02	M. Marulasiddappa	INC	36,144	35.80	7,289	7.22
Chikmagalur	157	Tarikere	T. H. Shivashankarappa	INC	47,593	44.24	H. Omkarappa	BJP	27,919	25.95	19,674	18.29
Davanagere	158	Channagiri	Mahima J. Patel	JD(S)	42,837	40.61	Vadnal Rajanna	INC	32,154	30.48	10,683	10.13
Shimoga	159	Holehonnur (SC)	G. Basavanneppa	BJP	50,071	44.73	Kariyanna	INC	43,769	39.10	6,302	5.63
Shimoga	160	Bhadravati	B. K. Sangameshwara	IND	52,572	53.69	M. J. Appaji	INC	35,141	35.89	17,431	17.80
Davanagere	161	Honnali	M. P. Renukacharya	BJP	46,593	38.56	D. G. Shanthanagowda	INC	39,119	32.37	7,474	6.19
Shimoga	162	Shimoga	K. S. Eshwarappa	BJP	69,015	54.35	H. N. Chandrashekarappa	INC	49,766	39.19	19,249	15.16
Shimoga	163	Tirthahalli	Araga Jnanendra	BJP	47,843	48.29	Kimmane Rathnakar	INC	46,468	46.90	1,375	1.39
Shimoga	164	Hosanagar	H. Halappa	BJP	49,086	39.08	G. D. Narayanappa	INC	32,235	25.66	16,851	13.42
Shimoga	165	Sagar	Belur Gopalkrishna	BJP	57,455	54.14	Kagodu Thimmappa	INC	42,448	40.00	15,007	14.14
Shimoga	166	Sorab	S. Kumar Bangarappa	INC	44,677	43.43	Madhu Bangarappa	BJP	32,748	31.83	11,929	11.60
Shimoga	167	Shikaripur	B. S. Yediyurappa	BJP	64,972	55.50	K. Shekarappa	INC	45,019	38.46	19,953	17.04
Uttara Kannada	168	Sirsi (SC)	Vivekanand Vaidya	BJP	47,811	42.85	Jaiwant Premanand	INC	33,652	30.16	14,159	12.69
Uttara Kannada	169	Bhatkal	Shivananda Naik	BJP	46,471	44.71	J. D. Naik	INC	42,301	40.70	4,170	4.01
Uttara Kannada	170	Kumta	Mohan Krishna Shetty	INC	34,738	33.78	Shashibhushan E. Hegde	BJP	31,273	30.41	3,465	3.37
Uttara Kannada	171	Ankola	Vishweshwar Hegde Kageri	BJP	46,787	48.52	Shantaram Hegde	INC	30,709	31.85	16,078	16.67
Uttara Kannada	172	Karwar	Gangadhar Nagesh Bhat	BJP	36,397	45.19	Prabhakar Rane	JD(S)	20,165	25.04	16,232	20.15
Uttara Kannada	173	Haliyal	R. V. Deshpande	INC	55,974	43.68	V. S. Patil	BJP	41,765	32.59	14,209	11.09
Dharwad	174	Dharwad Rural	Vinay Kulkarni	IND	33,744	32.38	A. B. Desai	JD(U)	30,514	29.28	3,230	3.10
Dharwad	175	Dharwad	S. R. Morey	INC	43,334	38.19	Chandrakant Bellad	BJP	37,584	33.13	5,750	5.06
Dharwad	176	Hubli	Jabbarkhan Honnalli	INC	41,971	46.08	Ashok Katwe	BJP	40,155	44.09	1,816	1.99
Dharwad	177	Hubli Rural	Jagadish Shettar	BJP	58,501	43.66	Anil Kumar Patil	INC	31,965	23.86	26,536	19.80
Dharwad	178	Kalghatgi	Siddanagouda Chikkanagoudra	BJP	28,065	26.91	S. Chanaveeranagouda	INC	26,016	24.95	2,049	1.96
Dharwad	179	Kundgol	Mallikarjunappa Akki	JD(U)	28,184	29.50	C. S. Shivalli	IND	23,942	25.06	4,242	4.44
Haveri	180	Shiggaon	Sindhura Rajashekar	IND	41,811	35.94	Syed Azeempeer Khadri	INC	40,971	35.22	840	0.72
Haveri	181	Hanagal	C. M. Udasi	BJP	61,167	51.14	Manohar Tahasildar	INC	43,080	36.02	18,087	15.12
Haveri	182	Hirekerur	B. C. Patil	JD(S)	39,237	35.10	U. B. Banakar	BJP	34,247	30.64	4,990	4.46
Haveri	183	Ranibennur	G. Shivanna	BJP	57,123	49.28	K. B. Koliwad	INC	41,037	35.40	16,086	13.88
Haveri	184	Byadgi (SC)	Nehru Olekar	BJP	52,686	52.54	Rudrappa Lamani	INC	41,408	41.29	11,278	11.25
Haveri	185	Haveri	Shivaraj Sajjanar	BJP	53,482	45.93	Basavaraj Shivannanavar	INC	51,286	44.05	2,196	1.88
Gadag	186	Shirhatti	S. Gaddadevaramath	INC	34,151	37.79	Ganganna Mahantashettar	JD(U)	31,205	34.53	2,946	3.26
Gadag	187	Mundargi	Shidlinganagouda Patil	INC	40,287	45.72	B. F. Dandin	JD(S)	21,071	23.91	19,216	21.81
Gadag	188	Gadag	H. K. Patil	INC	50,580	51.96	S. B. Sankannavar	BJP	35,376	36.34	15,204	15.62
Gadag	189	Ron	Kalakappa Bandi	BJP	46,733	49.51	Gurupadagouda Patil	INC	38,668	40.97	8,065	8.54
Gadag	190	Naragund	C. C. Patil	BJP	43,382	54.36	B. R. Yavagal	INC	31,260	39.17	12,122	15.19
Dharwad	191	Navalgund	R. B. Shiriyannavar	BJP	30,195	34.89	Kallappa Nagappa Gaddi	INC	26,356	30.45	3,839	4.44
Belagavi	192	Ramdurg	Mahadevappa Yadawad	BJP	56,585	54.21	Ashok Pattan	INC	31,044	29.74	25,541	24.47
Belagavi	193	Parasgad	Vishwanath Mamani	IND	38,451	34.24	Subhash Koujalgi	INC	37,006	32.95	1,445	1.29
Belagavi	194	Bailhongal	Jagadish Metgud	BJP	48,208	50.58	Mahantesh Koujalgi	INC	36,633	38.44	11,575	12.14
Belagavi	195	Kittur	Suresh Marihal	BJP	49,970	47.04	D. B. Inamdar	INC	35,265	33.19	14,705	13.85
Belagavi	196	Khanapur	Digambar Yashwantrao Patil	IND	19,115	18.26	Patil Vaishali Ashok	IND	18,747	17.91	368	0.35
Belagavi	197	Belgaum	Ramesh Kudachi	INC	32,198	32.58	Vilas Pawar	BJP	31,181	31.55	1,017	1.03
Belagavi	198	Uchagaon	Manohar Kinikar	IND	42,483	32.57	Sambhaji Laxman Patil	INC	31,277	23.98	11,206	8.59
Belagavi	199	Bagewadi	Abhay Patil	BJP	32,854	27.77	Shivaputrappa Malagi	INC	29,156	24.64	3,698	3.13
Belagavi	200	Gokak (ST)	Ramesh Jarkiholi	INC	56,768	55.19	Mallappa Muttennavar	BJP	40,593	39.47	16,175	15.72
Belagavi	201	Arabhavi	Balachandra Jarkiholi	JD(S)	62,054	47.06	Veeranna Koujalgi	INC	42,604	32.31	19,450	14.75
Belagavi	202	Hukkeri	Shashikanth Akkappa Naik	BJP	46,969	47.26	Umesh Katti	INC	46,148	46.43	821	0.83
Belagavi	203	Sankeshwar	Appayagouda Patil	INC	52,036	54.42	Rajendra Malagouda Patil	BJP	35,828	37.47	16,208	16.95
Belagavi	204	Nippani	Kakasaheb Panduranga Patil	INC	40,222	41.31	Subhash Shridhar Joshi	BJP	39,793	40.87	429	0.44
Belagavi	205	Sadalga	Prakash Hukkeri	INC	58,039	54.46	Annasaheb Jolle	BJP	38,737	36.35	19,302	18.11
Belagavi	206	Chikkodi (SC)	Hakkyagol Dattu Yellappa	BJP	32,663	34.61	S. S. Bhimannavar	INC	30,121	31.92	2,542	2.69
Belagavi	207	Raibag (SC)	Bheemappa Sarikar	JD(U)	54,049	44.20	Laxman Kamble	INC	43,855	35.87	10,194	8.33
Belagavi	208	Kagwad	Raju Kage	BJP	44,529	42.49	Kiran Kumar Patil	INC	41,077	39.19	3,452	3.30
Belagavi	209	Athani	Laxman Savadi	BJP	59,578	50.73	D. Shahajan Ismail	INC	28,325	24.12	31,253	26.61
Bagalkot	210	Jamkhandi	Siddu Savadi	BJP	73,223	52.42	Ramappa Kaluti	INC	39,902	28.57	33,321	23.85
Bagalkot	211	Bilgi	Murugesh Nirani	BJP	68,136	52.55	J. T. Patil	INC	50,811	39.19	17,325	13.36
Bagalkot	212	Mudhol (SC)	Govind Karjol	BJP	71,814	57.07	R. B. Timmapur	INC	38,872	30.89	32,942	26.18
Bagalkot	213	Bagalkot	Veeranna Charantimath	BJP	34,597	33.33	Pralhad Pujari	IND	29,075	28.01	5,522	5.32
Bagalkot	214	Badami	Mahagundappa Pattanshetti	BJP	52,678	53.86	B. B. Chimmanakatti	INC	33,677	34.43	19,001	19.43
Bagalkot	215	Guledgud	H. Y. Meti	JD(S)	30,832	34.80	Rajashekhar Sheelavant	BJP	29,426	33.22	1,406	1.58
Bagalkot	216	Hungund	Doddanagouda Patil	BJP	50,617	56.91	Gouramma Kashappanavar	INC	32,193	36.20	18,424	20.71
Bijapur	217	Muddebihal	C. S. Nadagouda	INC	30,203	36.39	Vimalabai Deshmukh	JD(S)	27,776	33.47	2,427	2.92
Bijapur	218	Huvin-Hippargi	Shivputrappa Desai	BJP	39,224	43.61	B. S. Patil	INC	32,927	36.61	6,297	7.00
Bijapur	219	Basavana-Bagewadi	Shivanand Patil	INC	50,238	48.46	S. K. Bellubbi	BJP	46,933	45.27	3,305	3.19
Bijapur	220	Tikota	M. B. Patil	INC	48,274	53.77	Rudragoudar Sahebagouda	JD(U)	19,040	21.21	29,234	32.56
Bijapur	221	Bijapur	Appu Pattanshetty	BJP	70,001	55.55	Ustad Maheboob Patel	INC	45,968	36.48	24,033	19.07
Bijapur	222	Ballolli (SC)	R. K. Rathod	JD(S)	39,915	39.90	H. R. Alagur	INC	28,873	28.86	11,042	11.04
Bijapur	223	Indi	Ravikant Patil	IND	42,984	43.61	B. G. Patil Halasangi	INC	33,652	34.14	9,332	9.47
Bijapur	224	Sindgi	Ashok Shabadi	BJP	38,853	39.28	M. C. Managuli	JD(S)	29,803	30.13	9,050	9.15

== Government formation ==
In the elections, the BJP emerged as the single largest party, winning 79 of the 224 seats. However, the Indian National Congress with 65 members and the Janata Dal (Secular) with 58 members formed a coalition to run the government. Dharam Singh of the Congress was sworn in as the chief minister on 28 May 2004. However, in early 2006, the JD(S) withdrew its support to the government and instead forged an alliance with the BJP. A new government was formed with H. D. Kumaraswamy of the JD(S) as chief minister and B. S. Yeddyurappa of the BJP as his deputy.
