= List of former constituencies of the Lok Sabha =

This is a list of former constituencies of the Lok Sabha of India, organised by date of abolition. It does not include constituencies which were merely renamed.

== Constituencies abolished in 1956 ==
=== Bombay (2) ===
The constituencies came into existence in 1951. With the implementation of States Reorganisation Act, 1956, it ceased to exist when these places of erstwhile Bombay State got merged with Mysore State in 1956.

1. Belgaum North constituency replaced by Chikkodi constituency of Karnataka
2. Belgaum South constituency replaced by Belgaum constituency of Karnataka.

=== Hyderabad (2) ===
The constituencies came into existence in 1951. With the implementation of States Reorganisation Act, 1956, it ceased to exist when these places of erstwhile Hyderabad State got merged with Mysore State in 1956.

1. Kushtagi constituency replaced by Koppal constituency of Karnataka
2. Yadgir constituency replaced by Raichur constituency of Karnataka

=== Madras (2) ===
The constituencies came into existence in 1951. With the implementation of States Reorganisation Act, 1956, it ceased to exist when these places of erstwhile Madras State got merged with Mysore State in 1956.

1. South Kanara (North) constituency replaced by Udupi constituency of Karnataka
2. South Kanara (South) constituency replaced by Mangalore constituency of Karnataka.

=== Mysore (1) ===
1. Hassan Chickmagalur constituency

== Constituencies abolished in 1966 ==
Some of the Constituencies were abolished before 1967 Lok Sabha Elections. The Lok Sabha constituencies, abolished as a result were as follows:

=== Maharashtra (1) ===
1. Gondia constituency

=== Mysore (4) ===
1. Bijapur North constituency replaced by Bijapur constituency of Karnataka
2. Bijapur South constituency replaced by Bagalkot constituency of Karnataka
3. Tiptur constituency
4. Bangalore City constituency

== Constituencies abolished in 1976 ==
The recommendations of the Delimitation Commission constituted in 1973 to redraw the boundaries of the Lok Sabha constituencies and their reservation status were approved in 1976. The Lok Sabha constituencies, abolished as a result were as follows:

=== Andhra Pradesh (2) ===
1. Gudivada constituency
2. Kavali constituency

=== Assam (1) ===
1. Cachar constituency

=== Karnataka (3) ===
1. Bangalore constituency
2. Madhugiri constituency
3. Hoskote constituency

=== Kerala (5) ===
1. Thiruvalla constituency
2. Ambalapuzha constituency
3. Peermade constituency
4. Thalassery constituency
5. Muvattupuzha constituency

=== Maharashtra (1) ===
1. Khamgaon constituency

=== Uttar Pradesh (1) ===
1. Dehradun constituency replaced by Haridwar constituency

== Constituencies abolished in 2008 ==
The most recent Delimitation Commission was constituted on July 12, 2002. The recommendations of the commission were approved by the Presidential notification on February 19, 2008. The Lok Sabha constituencies, abolished as a result were as follows:

=== Andhra Pradesh (7) ===
1. Bhadrachalam constituency
2. Bobbili constituency
3. Hanamkonda constituency
4. Miryalguda constituency
5. Parvathipuram constituency
6. Siddipet constituency
7. Tenali constituency

=== Bihar (10) ===
1. Bagaha constituency
2. Balia constituency
3. Barh constituency
4. Bettiah constituency
5. Bikramganj constituency
6. Chapra constituency
7. Motihari constituency
8. Patna constituency
9. Rosera constituency
10. Saharsa constituency

=== Chhattisgarh (1) ===
1. Sarangarh constituency

=== Delhi (3) ===
1. Delhi Sadar constituency
2. Karol Bagh constituency
3. Outer Delhi constituency

=== Gujarat (4) ===
1. Ahmedabad constituency
2. Kapadvanj constituency
3. Mandvi constituency
4. Dhandhuka constituency

=== Haryana (2) ===
1. Bhiwani constituency
2. Mahendragarh constituency

=== Karnataka (6) ===
1. Chikmagalur constituency, partially merged Udupi Chikmagalur constituency
2. Dharwad North constituency replaced by Dharwad constituency
3. Dharwad South constituency replaced by Haveri constituency
4. Kanakapura constituency replaced by Bangalore Rural constituency
5. Mangalore constituency replaced by Dakshina Kannada constituency
6. Udupi constituency, partially merged Udupi Chikmagalur constituency

=== Kerala (6) ===
1. Adoor constituency
2. Chirayinkil constituency
3. Manjeri constituency
4. Muvattupuzha constituency
5. Mukundapuram constituency
6. Ottapalam constituency

=== Madhya Pradesh (2) ===
1. Seoni constituency
2. Shajapur constituency

=== Maharashtra (15) ===
1. Bhandara constituency
2. Chimur constituency
3. Dahanu constituency
4. Erandol constituency
5. Ichalkaranji constituency
6. Karad constituency
7. Khed constituency
8. Kolaba constituency
9. Kopargaon constituency
10. Malegaon constituency
11. Pandharpur constituency
12. Rajapur constituency
13. Ratnagiri constituency
14. Washim constituency
15. Yavatmal constituency

=== Odisha (2) ===
1. Deogarh constituency
2. Phulbani constituency

=== Punjab (3) ===
1. Phillaur constituency
2. Ropar constituency
3. Tarn Taran constituency

=== Rajasthan (5) ===
1. Bayana constituency replaced by Karauli–Dholpur constituency
2. Jhalawar constituency replaced by Jhalawar–Baran constituency
3. Salumber constituency replaced by Rajsamand constituency
4. Sawai Madhopur constituency replaced by Tonk–Sawai Madhopur constituency
5. Tonk constituency replaced by Jaipur Rural constituency

=== Tamil Nadu (12) ===
1. Chengalpattu constituency replaced by Kancheepuram constituency
2. Gobichettipalayam constituency replaced by Tiruppur constituency
3. Nagercoil constituency replaced by Kanyakumari constituency
4. Palani constituency split between Dindigul constituency and Karur constituency
5. Periyakulam constituency replaced by Theni constituency
6. Pudukkottai constituency split between Karur constituency, Ramanathapuram constituency, Sivaganga constituency, Thanjavur constituency and Tiruchirapalli constituency
7. Rasipuram constituency replaced by Kallakurichi constituency and Namakkal constituency
8. Sivakasi constituency split between Tenkasi constituency, Thoothukudi constituency and Virudhunagar constituency
9. Tindivanam constituency replaced by Viluppuram constituency
10. Tiruchendur constituency split between Kanyakumari constituency, Tirunelveli constituency and Thoothukudi constituency
11. Tiruchengode constituency split between Erode constituency, Namakkal constituency and Salem constituency
12. Vandavasi constituency replaced by Arani constituency and Tiruvannamalai constituency

=== Uttar Pradesh (11) ===
1. Balrampur constituency
2. Bilhaur constituency
3. Chail constituency
4. Ghatampur constituency
5. Hapur constituency
6. Jalesar constituency
7. Khalilabad constituency
8. Khurja constituency
9. Padrauna constituency
10. Saidpur constituency
11. Shahabad constituency

=== Uttarakhand (1) ===
1. Nainital constituency replaced by Nainital–Udhamsingh Nagar constituency

=== West Bengal (8) ===
1. Burdwan constituency
2. Calcutta North West constituency
3. Calcutta North East constituency
4. Durgapur constituency
5. Katwa constituency
6. Malda constituency
7. Nabadwip constituency
8. Panskura constituency

== Constituencies abolished after 2009 ==
=== Anglo-Indian reserved seats in the Lok Sabha ===
Between 1952 and 2020, two seats were reserved in the Lok Sabha, the lower house of the Parliament of India, for members of the Anglo-Indian community. These two members were nominated by the President of India on the advice of the Government of India. In January 2020, the Anglo-Indian reserved seats in the Parliament and State Legislatures of India were abolished.

=== Delimitation of Jammu and Kashmir parliament constituencies in 2022 ===
1. Anantnag (New Anantnag–Rajouri Lok Sabha constituency carved out from existing Anantnag Lok Sabha constituency and Jammu Lok Sabha constituency)

=== Assam Delimitation of Parliamentary and Assembly constituencies in 2023 ===
1. Mangaldoi (Merged with Darrang–Udalguri Lok Sabha constituency)
2. Kaliabor (New Kaziranga Lok Sabha constituency carved out from erstwhile Kaliabor and some extent of Nowgong Lok Sabha constituency)
3. Tezpur Lok Sabha constituency (renamed as Sonitpur Lok Sabha constituency)
4. Autonomous District (renamed as Diphu Lok Sabha constituency)

== See also ==
- List of constituencies of the Lok Sabha
