= Maharashtra Ekikaran Samiti =

Political movement in Western India

- Abbreviation: MES
- Leader: Manohar Kallappa Kinekar
- President: Prakash Margale
- Secretary: Maloji Astekar
- Founders: Vasantrao Patil
- Founded: 1946
- Headquarters: Belgaum
- Ideology: Merger of 862 villages of Karnataka into Maharashtra; Hindutva
- Colours: Orange
- ECI Status: Unrecognised Party
- Alliance: Balasahebanchi Shiv Sena; Nationalist Congress Party (Ajit Pawar); Shiv Sena (Uddhav Balasaheb Thackeray); Maharashtra Navnirman Sena
- Seats in Rajya Sabha: 0 / 245
- Seats in Lok Sabha: 0 / 543
- Seats in Belgaum Mahanagara Palike: 07 / 58 (Belgaum Mahanagara Palike)
- Seats in Karnataka Legislative Assembly and Karnataka Legislative Council: 0 / 224 (Karnataka Legislative Assembly) 0 / 75 (Karnataka Legislative Council)

Party flag

Website
- https://mesamithi.in

Maharashtra Ekikaran Samiti (Committee for Integration with Maharashtra)( abbr. MES) is a linguistic socio-political committee based in Belgaum city in the Indian state of Karnataka. It acts as a party demanding the merger Belagavi district in Karnataka with the Maharashtra. The president of Maharashtra ekikaran samiti for 22 years was late Vasantrao Parashram Patil. He was elected twice from Khanapur, Karnataka Assembly constituency. He had stronghold leader from MES in Belgaum. He had good relations with NCP chief Sharad Pawar. Since his early age he had participated in the struggle.

== Electoral Performance ==
Karnataka Legislative Assembly Elections

Year	Seats won	Change in seats
1957	1 / 234	▲1
1962	6 / 234	▲5
1967	2 / 234	▼4
1972	3 / 234	▲1
1978	5 / 234	▲2
1983	3 / 234	▼2
1985	3 / 234	▼0
1989	2 / 234	▼1
1994	2 / 234	▼0
1999	0 / 234	▼2
2004	1 / 234	▲1
2008	0 / 234	▼1
2013	2 / 234	▲2
2018	0 / 234	▼2
2023	0 / 234	▼0

== History ==
After India became independent in 1947, the Belagavi district (which was in the erstwhile Bombay Presidency) became a part of the Bombay State. In 1948, the Belagavi City Council passed a resolution declaring that the district was a Marathi majority district and demanding for the inclusion of the Belagavi district in the proposed state of Samyukta Maharashtra. The Maharashtra Ekikaran Samiti was formed in the same year pursuing the single point demand for the inclusion of the district in the state of Maharashtra. The States Reorganisation Commission recommended the inclusion of the Belagavi district to the state of Mysore. The district was subsequently merged into the Mysore State (currently Karnataka) when the States Reorganisation Act, 1956 was passed by the Parliament of India. The Economic Times describes the MES to have held a significant influence in the district since.

== Electoral history ==
The committee has consistently supported candidates for the Karnataka Legislative Assembly; primarily from constituencies in the district of Belagavi. The committee members have also contested elections to the Belagavi City Corporation where it has held a dominant position from time to time. It was a registered party in the 1962 Mysore Legislative Assembly election.

- 1962 Karnataka Assembly : MES won 6 seats. MES won in Karwar, Khanapur, and Nippani.
  And all 3 candidates elected from Belagavi were from MES.
  1) Balkrishna Sunthankar, 2) Vitthal Patil, and 3) Nagendra Samaji.
- Belagavi Vidhan Sabha Seat : MES won it in 1957, 1962, 1967, 1972(?), 1978, 1983, 1985, 1989, 1994.
- Uchagaon Vidhan Sabha Seat : MES won it in 1972, 1978, 1983, 1985, 1989, 1994, 2004. The seat ceased to exist after 2008.
- Bagewadi Vidhan Sabha Constituency : MES won it in 1978, 1983. But lost in 1985 and 1994.
- Khanapur Vidhan Sabha Seat : MES won it in 1962, 1967, 1972, 1978, 2013.
- Nippani Vidhan Sabha Seat : MES won it in 1962, 1978.
- Belgaum 2021 Bypoll Shubhan Vikrant Shelke, backed by the Maharashtra Ekikaran Samiti and Shiv Sena, garnered over 1.24 lakh votes and stood third.

== Candidates in elections ==
V N Nisal (President of the first committee)
Dr Kowadkar (Leading light in 1950s)
Shri B R Sunthankar (Leading light in 1950s and 1960s), and MLA from Belagavi in 1957 and 1962
Laxman Birje, MLA from Khanapur in 1957 and 1962
Nilkanth Sardesai, MLA from Khanapur in 1967, 1972, 1978
Balwant Bhimrao Sayanak who became MLA from Belagavi in 1967 and 1978
Prabhakar Pawashe, MLA from Uchagaon in 1972 and 1978
Govind Ashtekar, MLA from Bagewadi in 1978, 1983, but lost in 1985 and 1994
Basavant Iroji Patil, MLA from Uchagaon in 1983, 1985, 1989, 1994. But he lost in 1999.
Rajabhau Mane, MLA from Belagavi in 1983, 1985
Bapusaheb Mahagaonkar, MLA from Belagavi in 1989.
Narayan Rao Tarale, MLA from Belagavi in 1994
Sambhaji Patil (1951-2019) was the mayor of Belgaum city for three terms and was elected to the Karnataka Legislative Assembly from the Belagavi Dakshin constituency for one term in 2013.
Manohar Kinekar was a former member of the Karnataka Legislative Assembly from the Uchagaon constituency in 2004, but lost from Balagavi Rural in 2013.

== See also ==
- Belagavi border dispute
