= Bagewadi Assembly constituency =

Bagewadi Assembly constituency may refer to many constituencies in Karnataka:

- Hire Bagewadi Assembly constituency, Belagavi district, Karnataka, India
- Basavana Bagevadi Assembly constituency, Bijapur district, Karnataka, India
