= Lakshmi Hebbalkar =

Indian politician

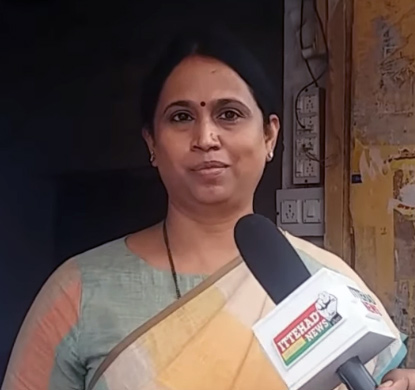
- Hebbalkar in 2020

Ex Cabinet Minister, Government of Karnataka
- In office 27 May 2023 – 29 May 2026
- Governor: Thawarchand Gehlot
- Chief Minister: Siddaramaiah
- Cabinet: Second Siddaramaiah ministry
- Ministry and Departments: Women & Child Development; Disabled & Senior Citizens Empowerment
- Preceded by: Halappa Achar

Member of the Karnataka Legislative Assembly
- Incumbent
- Assumed office May 2018
- Preceded by: Sanjay Patil
- Constituency: Belagavi Rural

Personal details
- Born: 28 May 1975 (age 51) Chikka Hattiholi, Khanapur Taluka, Belagavi district, Karnataka, India
- Party: Indian National Congress
- Spouse: Ravindra Hebbalkar
- Children: 1
- Education: Mysore University)

Lakshmi Ravindra Hebbalkar (born 28 May 1975) is an Indian politician from Karnataka. She is the ex Minister of Women and Child Development, and Disabled and Senior Citizens Empowerment in the Government of Karnataka. As a member of the Indian National Congress, she is an elected member of the Karnataka Legislative Assembly from Belagavi Rural.

== Personal life ==
Lakshmi Hebbalkar was born in Chikka Hatand joined the Congress party in 2004. She holds a master's degree in political science from Mysore University.

== Political career ==
Hebbalkar held the position of general secretary of the Karnataka Pradesh Mahila Congress Committee for a brief period before being asked to head the Belagavi District pradesh Congress Committee in 2010 as its first woman president. She unsuccessfully contested from the Belgavi (Rural) Vidhan Sabha seat in 2013, and then from Belagavi Lok Sabha seat in 2014. In 2015, she was appointed the Karnataka Pradesh Congress Committee women's wing president. In the legislative assembly election that followed, she defeated Sanjay Patil of the Bharatiya Janata Party and was elected as a legislator first time, while contesting from the same constituency. Hebbalkar was quizzed for two days by Enforcement Directorate in September 2019 in connection with a probe into a money laundering case.

Hebbalkar was reelected to the assembly in 2023 and was appointed the Minister of Women and Child Development as part of the Siddaramaiah ministry.

== Current Role and Achievements ==
- Appointment as Minister of Women and Child Development in the Karnataka government.
- Impact and responsibilities in the current role.
