= Belgaum Rural Assembly constituency =

Legislative Assembly constituency in Karnataka, India

Coordinates: 15.83°N 74.51°E

Belgaum Rural
- Constituency No. 13 for the Karnataka Legislative Assembly

Constituency details
- Country: India
- Region: South India
- State: Karnataka
- District: Belagavi
- Lok Sabha constituency: Belgaum
- Established: 1951 (first establishment); 2008 (second establishment)
- Total electors: 2,59,537
- Reservation: None

Member of Legislative Assembly
- 16th Karnataka Legislative Assembly
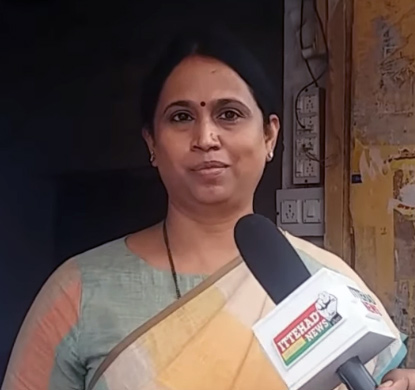
- Incumbent Lakshmi Hebbalkar
- Party: Indian National Congress
- Elected year: 2018

Belgaum Rural Assembly constituency is one of 224 assembly constituencies in Karnataka state, in India. It is one of the eight constituencies which make up Belgaum Lok Sabha constituency. The constituency came into existence for the second time when the assembly map was redrawn in 2008. Prior to that most of its area was under the now-defunct Uchagaon Assembly constituency and Hire Bagewadi Assembly constituency.

== Members of the Legislative Assembly ==
Election	Member	Party
1952	Sadashiv Bhosle	Indian National Congress
1952 By-election	S. N. Omanna	Peasants and Workers Party of India
2008	Sanjay Patil	Bharatiya Janata Party
2013	Sanjay Patil	Bharatiya Janata Party
2018	Lakshmi Hebbalkar	Indian National Congress
2023	Lakshmi Hebbalkar	Indian National Congress

== Election results ==
=== Assembly Election 2023 ===
2023 Karnataka Legislative Assembly election : Belgaum Rural
Party	Candidate	Votes	%	±%
INC	Lakshmi Hebbalkar	107,619	52.61%	▼2.13
BJP	Nagesh Annappa Manolkar	51,603	25.23%	▼1.76
Independent	R. M. Chougule	41,500	20.29%	New
NOTA	None of the above	1,165	0.57%	▼0.48
Margin of victory		56,016	27.38%	▼0.37
Turnout		204,672	78.86%	▲1.23
Total valid votes		204,562		
Registered electors		259,537		▲7.97
INC hold		Swing	▼2.13	

=== Assembly Election 2018 ===
2018 Karnataka Legislative Assembly election: Belgaum Rural
Party	Candidate	Votes	%	±%
INC	Lakshmi Hebbalkar	102,040	54.74%	▲31.19
BJP	Sanjay Patil	50,316	26.99%	▲1.79
Independent	Kinekar Manohar Kallappa	23,776	12.75%	New
JD(S)	Patil Shivanagouda. S	3,794	2.04%	▲0.83
NOTA	None of the above	1,958	1.05%	New
Margin of victory		51,724	27.75%	▲26.87
Turnout		186,605	77.63%	▲3.63
Total valid votes		186,419		
Registered electors		240,389		▲16.93
INC gain from BJP		Swing	▲29.54	

=== Assembly Election 2013 ===
2013 Karnataka Legislative Assembly election : Belgaum Rural
Party	Candidate	Votes	%	±%
BJP	Sanjay Patil	38,322	25.20%	▼6.53
Independent	Kinekar Manohar Kallappa	36,987	24.32%	New
INC	Lakshmi Ravindra Hebbalkar	35,811	23.55%	▼1.94
Independent	Anandswamy Gaddadevarmath	17,670	11.62%	New
Independent	Shivaji Kedari Suntakar	15,759	10.36%	New
KJP	Sunanda L Patil	2,290	1.51%	New
JD(S)	Ashok B Govekar	1,837	1.21%	▼1.23
Independent	Balasaheb Bhimappa Sattigeri	1,023	0.67%	New
Margin of victory		1,335	0.88%	▼5.37
Turnout		152,126	74.00%	▲2.89
Total valid votes		152,059		
Registered electors		205,579		▲9.89
BJP hold		Swing	▼6.53	

=== Assembly Election 2008 ===
2008 Karnataka Legislative Assembly election : Belgaum Rural
Party	Candidate	Votes	%	±%
BJP	Sanjay Patil	42,208	31.73%	New
INC	Malagi Shivaputrappa Chanabasappa	33,899	25.49%	▼19.32
Independent	Kinekar Manohar Kallappa	28,689	21.57%	New
Independent	Shivaji Kedari Suntakar	17,286	13.00%	New
JD(S)	Rukmini Ganganna Gouda	3,239	2.44%	New
BSP	Sahukar Mallasettappa	2,447	1.84%	New
Independent	Balu Ramling Anagolkar	2,203	1.66%	New
IUML	Rajgoli Tousif	1,447	1.09%	New
LJP	Kollanatti Bhimappa Balappa	841	0.63%	New
Margin of victory		8,309	6.25%	▼4.14
Turnout		133,031	71.11%	
Total valid votes		133,012		
Registered electors		187,080		
BJP gain from P&W		Swing	▼23.46	

=== Assembly By-election 1952 ===
1952 Bombay Legislative Assembly by-election : Belgaum Rural
Party	Candidate	Votes	%	±%
PWPI	S. N. Omanna	25,521	55.19%	New
INC	C. N. Iroji	20,718	44.81%	▼4.23
Margin of victory		4,803	10.39%	▼5.83
Total valid votes		46,239		
PWPI gain from INC		Swing	▲6.15	

=== Assembly Election 1952 ===
1952 Bombay State Legislative Assembly election : Belgaum Rural
Party	Candidate	Votes	%	±%
INC	Sadashiv Bhosle	19,138	49.04%	New
PWPI	Desai Govindrao Shamrao	12,809	32.82%	New
KMPP	Patil Kalgouda Shidgouda	4,394	11.26%	New
Independent	Jadhav Ramchandra Babasa	2,687	6.88%	New
Margin of victory		6,329	16.22%	
Turnout		39,028	69.07%	
Total valid votes		39,028		
Registered electors		56,504		
INC win (new seat)				

== See also ==
- Belagavi District
- List of constituencies of Karnataka Legislative Assembly
