= Belgaum Dakshin Assembly constituency =

Legislative Assembly constituency in Karnataka, India

Coordinates: 15.82°N 74.50°E

Belgaum Dakshin
- Constituency No. 12 for the Karnataka Legislative Assembly

Constituency details
- Country: India
- Region: South India
- State: Karnataka
- District: Belagavi
- Lok Sabha constituency: Belgaum
- Established: 2008
- Total electors: 2,48,626
- Reservation: None

Member of Legislative Assembly
- 16th Karnataka Legislative Assembly
- Incumbent Abhay Patil
- Party: Bharatiya Janata Party
- Elected year: 2023

Belgaum Dakshin Assembly constituency (also called Belgaum South) is one of the 224 constituencies of Karnataka Legislative Assembly which came into existence in 2008 when the electoral map of India was redrawn. It is a part of Belgaum Lok Sabha constituency in the Indian state of Karnataka.

== List of Member of Legislative Assembly ==
| Year | Name | Party |
|---|---|---|
1967-2008: See Belgaum, Uchagaon & Hire Bagewadi
| 2008 | Abhay Patil | Bharatiya Janata Party |
| 2013 | Sambhajirao Lakshmanrao Patil | Maharashtra Ekikaran Samiti |
| 2018 | Abhay Patil | Bharatiya Janata Party |
| 2023 | Abhay Patil | Bharatiya Janata Party |

== Election results ==
=== Assembly Election 2023 ===
2023 Karnataka Legislative Assembly election : Belgaum Dakshin
| Party | Candidate | Votes | % | ±% |
|---|---|---|---|---|
| BJP | Abhay Patil | 77,094 | 48.45% | ▼9.14 |
| Independent | Ramakant Konduskar | 64,786 | 40.72% | New |
| INC | Prabhavati Basavaraj Mastmardi | 13,015 | 8.18% | ▼9.41 |
| NOTA | None of the above | 1,599 | 1.00% | |
| Margin of victory | | 12,308 | 7.74% | ▼32.26 |
| Turnout | | 159,263 | 64.06% | ▲1.56 |
| Total valid votes | | 159,111 | | |
| Registered electors | | 248,626 | | ▲5.85 |
| BJP hold | | Swing | ▼9.14 | |

=== Assembly Election 2018 ===
2018 Karnataka Legislative Assembly election : Belgaum Dakshin
| Party | Candidate | Votes | % | ±% |
|---|---|---|---|---|
| BJP | Abhay Patil | 84,498 | 57.59% | ▲21.12 |
| INC | M. D. Lakshminarayan (annayya) | 25,806 | 17.59% | ▲2.03 |
| Independent | Prakash Appaji Maragale | 21,537 | 14.68% | New |
| Independent | Kiran Krishna Saynak | 8,295 | 5.65% | New |
| NOTA | None of the above | 1,474 | 1.00% | New |
| Independent | N. S. Shankaracharya | 1,392 | 0.95% | New |
| JD(S) | Changadev Kugaji @ Mahesh Kugaji | 940 | 0.64% | ▼0.36 |
| Independent | Vardhman Devendra Gangai | 932 | 0.64% | New |
| Margin of victory | | 58,692 | 40.00% | ▲35.22 |
| Turnout | | 146,818 | 62.50% | ▼2.75 |
| Total valid votes | | 146,715 | | |
| Registered electors | | 234,896 | | ▲16.12 |
| BJP gain from Independent | | Swing | ▲16.34 | |

=== Assembly Election 2013 ===
2013 Karnataka Legislative Assembly election : Belgaum Dakshin
| Party | Candidate | Votes | % | ±% |
|---|---|---|---|---|
| Independent | Sambhaji Lakshman Patil | 54,426 | 41.25% | New |
| BJP | Abhay Patil | 48,116 | 36.47% | ▼3.49 |
| INC | Anil. M. Potdar | 20,536 | 15.56% | ▼9.28 |
| KJP | S. M. Dodamani | 5,597 | 4.24% | New |
| JD(S) | Basavaraj Shrishailappa Javali | 1,324 | 1.00% | ▲0.13 |
| Margin of victory | | 6,310 | 4.78% | ▼6.58 |
| Turnout | | 132,002 | 65.25% | ▲1.59 |
| Total valid votes | | 131,946 | | |
| Registered electors | | 202,294 | | ▲12.56 |
| Independent gain from BJP | | Swing | ▲1.29 | |

=== Assembly Election 2008 ===
2008 Karnataka Legislative Assembly election : Belgaum Dakshin
| Party | Candidate | Votes | % | ±% |
|---|---|---|---|---|
| BJP | Abhay Patil | 45,713 | 39.96% | New |
| Independent | Kiran Krishna Saynak | 32,723 | 28.61% | New |
| INC | Patil Sambhaji Laxman | 28,419 | 24.84% | New |
| Independent | Hulabatte Rajan Shantinath | 1,809 | 1.58% | New |
| IUML | Lodhi Aijaz Ahamed Mehaboobsab | 1,322 | 1.16% | New |
| JD(S) | Pramod Balasaheb Patil | 995 | 0.87% | New |
| SS | Prakash Ramchandra Shirolkar | 855 | 0.75% | New |
| BSP | Channahosur Sidrai Gangappa | 815 | 0.71% | New |
| Margin of victory | | 12,990 | 11.36% | |
| Turnout | | 114,400 | 63.66% | |
| Total valid votes | | 114,386 | | |
| Registered electors | | 179,717 | | |
| BJP win (new seat) | | | | |
