= Belgaum I Assembly constituency =

Former constituency in Karnataka, India

Coordinates: 15.885031°N 74.429793°E

Belgaum I
- Former constituency for the State Legislative Assembly

Constituency details
- Country: India
- State: Mysore State
- District: Belagavi
- Lok Sabha constituency: Belgaum
- Established: 1957
- Abolished: 1967
- Reservation: None

Belgaum I Assembly constituency was one of the Vidhana Sabha seats in the state assembly of Mysore, in India. It was a part of Belgaum Lok Sabha constituency, which is adjacent to Chikkodi Lok Sabha constituency.

== Members of the Legislative Assembly ==
Election	Member	Party
1957	Vithal Seetaram Patil	Peasants and Workers Party of India
1962	Vithal Seetaram Patil	Maharashtra Ekikaran Samiti

== Election results ==
=== Assembly Election 1962 ===
1962 Mysore State Legislative Assembly election : Belgaum I
Party	Candidate	Votes	%	±%
MES	Vithal Seetaram Patil	17,778	57.18%	New
INC	Vithal Kallojirao Patil	13,312	42.82%	▲2.71
Margin of victory		4,466	14.36%	▼5.43
Turnout		32,911	64.75%	▼5.24
Total valid votes		31,090		
Registered electors		50,824		▲18.27
MES gain from PWPI		Swing	▼2.71	

=== Assembly Election 1957 ===
1957 Mysore State Legislative Assembly election : Belgaum I
Party	Candidate	Votes	%	±%
PWPI	Vithal Seetaram Patil	18,016	59.90%	New
INC	Vithal Kallojirao Patil	12,063	40.10%	New
Margin of victory		5,953	19.79%	
Turnout		30,079	70.00%	
Total valid votes		30,079		
Registered electors		42,973		
PWPI win (new seat)				
