= B. N. Datar =

Indian politician

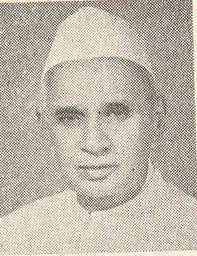

Union Minister of State, Home Affairs
- In office 14 February 1956 – 13 February 1963
- Preceded by: Rustom Khurshedji Sidhwa
- Succeeded by: Ramchandra Martand Hajarnavis

Member of Parliament, Lok Sabha
- In office 17 April 1952 – 13 February 1963
- Preceded by: constituency created
- Succeeded by: K. H. Veerabhadrappa
- Constituency: Belgaum

Personal details
- Born: 13 August 1894 Tasgaon, South Satara District, Bombay Presidency, British India (now in Sangli District, Maharashtra, India)
- Died: 13 February 1963 (aged 68) New Delhi, India
- Party: Indian National Congress
- Spouse: Subhadrabai (m. 1918–his death)
- Children: 4 sons, 4 daughters
- Education: Government Law College, Mumbai
- Occupation: Educationist, lawyer

Balwantrao Nageshrao Datar, known as B. N. Datar (13 August 1894 – 13 February 1963) was an Indian educationist, politician who served as State Minister of Home Affairs.

== Early life and education ==
Datar was educated at Deccan College, Baroda College (now the Maharaja Sayajirao University of Baroda) and the Government Law College, Mumbai, from which he qualified as a lawyer. From 1937 to 1942, he was a member of the Senate of the University of Bombay and a member of its Board of Studies in Kannada. He served on the academic council of Karnatak University from 1950 to 1952.

== Political career ==
In 1952, he was elected to the 1st Lok Sabha as a member of the Indian National Congress from the constituency of Belgaum North, holding this seat until the 1957 general election, when he was elected to the newly created seat of Belgaum. From August 1952 to February 1956, Datar was a deputy home minister in the Union government, with cabinet rank from February 1956 to April 1957. He then served as Minister of State for Home affairs until his death in office in February 1963.

Year	Description
1952	Elected to 1st Lok Sabha: Member of Parliament - Lok Sabha (1952–57)
1957	Elected to 2nd Lok Sabha: Member of Parliament - Lok Sabha (1957–62)

Lok Sabha
Preceded by none	Member of Parliament for Belgaum North; 1952 – 1957	Succeeded by Seat abolished
Preceded by Himself	Member of Parliament for Belgaum; 1957 – 1963	Succeeded by K. H. Veerabhadrappa
