= Sanjay Patil =

Indian politician

Member of the Karnataka Legislative Assembly
- In office 2008–2018
- Preceded by: None
- Succeeded by: Lakshmi Hebbalkar

Personal details
- Born: 1 January 1970 (age 56) Halondi, Hatkangale, Kolhapur, Hatkanangale
- Party: Bharatiya Janata Party
- Occupation: Politician
- Website: sanjaypatil.co.in

Sanjay Balaso Patil is an Indian Politician from the state of Karnataka. He is a two term member of the Karnataka Legislative Assembly.

== Constituency ==
He represents the Belgaum Rural constituency.

== Political Party ==
He is from the Bharatiya Janata Party.
