= Belgaum II Assembly constituency =

Former constituency in Karnataka, India

Coordinates: 15.774589°N 74.644923°E

Belgaum II
- Former constituency for the State Legislative Assembly

Constituency details
- Country: India
- State: Mysore State
- District: Belagavi
- Lok Sabha constituency: Belgaum
- Established: 1957
- Abolished: 1967
- Reservation: None

Belgaum II Assembly constituency was one of the Vidhana Sabha seats in the state assembly of Mysore, in India. It was part of Belgaum Lok Sabha constituency, which is adjacent to Chikkodi Lok Sabha constituency.

== Members of the Legislative Assembly ==
Election	Member	Party
1957	Samaji Nagendra Omana	Peasants and Workers Party of India
1962	Samaji Nagendra Omana	Maharashtra Ekikaran Samiti

== Election results ==
=== Assembly Election 1962 ===
1962 Mysore State Legislative Assembly election : Belgaum II
Party	Candidate	Votes	%	±%
MES	Nagendra Omanna Samaji	18,505	51.26%	New
INC	Chandrappa Lingapa Pattanshetti	17,592	48.74%	▲1.61
Margin of victory		913	2.53%	▼3.22
Turnout		38,251	71.77%	▲1.89
Total valid votes		36,097		
Registered electors		53,297		▲12.88
MES gain from PWPI		Swing	▼1.61	

=== Assembly Election 1957 ===
1957 Mysore State Legislative Assembly election : Belgaum II
Party	Candidate	Votes	%	±%
PWPI	Samaji Nagendra Omana	17,446	52.87%	New
INC	Patil Shiyangoud Babagoud	15,549	47.13%	New
Margin of victory		1,897	5.75%	
Turnout		32,995	69.88%	
Total valid votes		32,995		
Registered electors		47,214		
PWPI win (new seat)				
