= Abhay Patil =

Indian politician

Member of Karnataka Legislative Assembly
- Incumbent
- Assumed office 2018
- Preceded by: Sambhaji Lakshman Patil
- Constituency: Belgaum Dakshin
- In office 2008–2013
- Preceded by: Constituency created
- Succeeded by: Sambhaji Lakshman Patil
- Constituency: Belgaum Dakshin
- In office 2004–2008
- Preceded by: Shivaputrappa Malagi
- Succeeded by: Constituency defunct
- Constituency: Hire Bagewadi

Personal details
- Born: 1969 (age 56–57) Belgaum, India
- Party: Bharatiya Janata Party
- Spouse: Smt.Preeti
- Children: Anushk and Aryan
- Education: Bharatesh Industrial Training College

Abhay Kumar Patil, commonly known as Abhay Patil (born 1969), is an Indian politician belonging to the Bharatiya Janata Party (BJP). He is a Member of Legislative Assembly from Belgaum (Belagavi) Dakshin and was also the Member of Legislative Assembly from 2004 to 2008 where he represented Hire Bagewadi constituency, and from 2009 to 2013 he represented Belagavi Dakshin.

== Early life ==
Born in a family of traditional landlords to Sri. (Late) Bharamagouda Patil and Smt. (Late) Malini Bharamagouda Patil in 1969 at Belagavi, Karnataka, Abhay completed his elementary education at a government school and Chintamanrao High School at Shahpur, Belagavi. He pursued technical education and qualified from Bharatesh Industrial Training Institute in Belagavi. He is married and has two children. In the Ram Mandir movement, inspired by L. K. Advani, he decided to pursue a life in social work. He was drawn into the Rashtriya Swayamsevak Sangh and completed the Initial Training Camp soon after joining.

== Politics ==
Abhay Patil's political career began as a Karyakarta in the Bharatiya Janata Party (BJP). He rose quickly through the ranks of the cadre and was promoted as the Ward Pramukh and later the Assembly election in-charge of Hire Bagewadi constituency in 1996. His first stint at electoral politics in 1999 from Hire Bagewadi was unsuccessful. However, having been nominated for the second time in 2004 from the same constituency, he won the election at the age of 35 and was one of the youngest first-generation Member of Legislative Assembly (MLA) in India. During 2005–07, he was appointed the National Vice President of Bharatiya Janata Yuva Morcha (BJYM), under the Presidentship of Dharmendra Pradhan (former Union Minister of Education).

In 2008, he contested the Assembly elections from Belagavi Dakshin and won with a comfortable lead of 12,990 votes. During his term as MLA, he was appointed the Chairman of the Legislative Assembly's Estimates Committee for two separate terms during 2008-09 and 2012–13 by the Speaker of the Assembly. In 2013, he lost his third consecutive MLA election by a narrow margin. He was appointed Saha Sampark Pramukh of BJP Maha Sampark Abhiyaan of Karnataka's BJP unit. He won the 2018 Assembly elections on 15 May 2018 with a thumping lead of 58692 votes. He also won the 2023 Assembly elections, winning a fourth term as an MLA.

== Work ==
Patil launched 'Swacchata Abhiyaan' through 'Shramdaan' in Jaffarwadi and Hulikavi villages in 2006, as the first step in developing a Model village. BS Chandrashekhar, Chairman of the Karnataka Legislative Council, was impressed with his efforts during a visit, and sanctioned solar lamps for every household in Hulikavi.

Patil continues to engage in the cleaning of public places, gardens, places of worship, crematoriums, and graveyards every Sunday with a group of youngsters. He was responsible for promoting an IT park in Belagavi, he introduced a private members bill for it during his tenure as an MLA. He has introduced a Private member bill for the development action plan for Belagavi, 'Vision 2040', which was passed unanimously by the Assembly. He is said to have led the formation of one of the longest human chains in Belagavi in 2011, for "drawing the attention of Central Government for an Indian Institute of Technology in Belagavi".
