= Belgaum South Lok Sabha constituency =

Former Lok Sabha Constituency in Karnataka, India

Coordinates: 15.79°N 74.47°E

Belgaum South
- Former Lok Sabha constituency

Constituency details
- Country: India
- State: Bombay State
- Established: 1952
- Abolished: 1957
- Reservation: None

Belgaum South Lok Sabha constituency was a Lok Sabha constituency in Bombay State. This seat came into existence in 1951. With the implementation of States Reorganisation Act, 1956, it ceased to exist.

== Assembly segments ==
Belgaum South Lok Sabha constituency comprised the following seven Legislative Assembly segments:

1. Gokak
2. Ramdurg
3. Parasgad
4. Chandgad
5. Gadhinglaj
6. Belgaum Urban
7. Belgaum Rural

After Belgaum district of erstwhile Bombay State got merged with Mysore State in 1956, this seat ceased to exist and was replaced by Belgaum Lok Sabha constituency.

== Members of Parliament ==
- 1952: Shankargouda Patil, Indian National Congress
- 1957 onwards:Constituency does not exist. See : Belagavi Lok Sabha constituency

== See also ==
- Belgaum North Lok Sabha constituency
- Chikkodi Lok Sabha constituency
- Belgaum Lok Sabha constituency
- Belgaum district
- List of former constituencies of the Lok Sabha
