= Syed Zulfikar Hashmi =

Indian politician

Member of the Karnataka Legislative Assembly
- In office 1994–1999
- Constituency: Bidar Assembly constituency

Personal details
- Died: 20 April 2021
- Party: Bahujan Samaj Party; Janata Dal; Janata Dal (Secular)
- Children: 5
- Occupation: Politician

Syed Zulfikar Hashmi was an Indian politician from Bidar, Karnataka, known for being the first leader from South India to win an assembly election as a candidate of Bahujan Samaj Party in 1994. His victory was largely supported by Dalit and Muslim communities, especially in the aftermath of the Babri Masjid demolition in 1992. He joined the Janata Dal and later Janata Dal (Secular) but was unable to secure a seat in later elections. He advocated for unity between Dalit and Muslim communities. His political influence declined over time as he shifted party affiliations. He died from kidney ailments on 20 April 2021. He is survived by his wife and five children.
