= Belgaum Lok Sabha constituency =

Lok Sabha Constituency in Karnataka, India

Coordinates: 15.9°N 74.5°E

Belgaum
- Lok Sabha constituency
- Belagavi Lok Sabha Constituency Map

Constituency details
- Country: India
- Region: South India
- State: Karnataka
- Assembly constituencies: Arabhavi; Gokak; Belgaum Uttar; Belgaum Dakshin; Belgaum Rural; Bailahongal; Saundatti Yellamma; Ramdurg
- Established: 1951
- Total electors: 18,07,250 (2021)

Member of Parliament
- 18th Lok Sabha
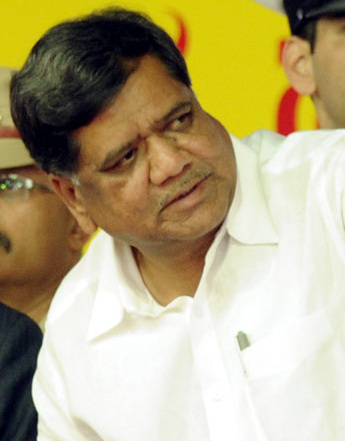
- Incumbent Jagadish Shetter
- Party: Bharatiya Janata Party
- Elected year: 2024
- Preceded by: Mangala Suresh Angadi

Belgaum Lok Sabha constituency (officially Belagavi) is one of the 28 Lok Sabha constituencies in the Indian state of Karnataka.

== Vidhana Sabha segments ==
The composition of Belgaum Lok Sabha seat has undergone several changes. In 1962, there were three assembly seats in the constituency from Belgaum, named Belgaum City, Belgaum I and Belgaum II. Then the map was redrawn and some seats like Khanapur, Uchagaon and Bagewadi were added to Belgaum seat as part of renaming. In 2008, it was back to three seats named after the city of Belgaum : North, South, and Rural. Since 2008, this seat comprises the following eight assembly segments in Karnataka Vidhan Sabha:

No (Note: Constituency number)	Name	District	Member	Party	Party Leading (in 2024)
8	Arabhavi	Belgaum	Balachandra Jarkiholi	BJP	BJP
9	Gokak	Belgaum	Ramesh Jarkiholi	BJP	BJP
11	Belgaum Uttar	Belgaum	Asif Sait	INC	BJP
12	Belgaum Dakshin	Belgaum	Abhay Patil	BJP	BJP
13	Belgaum Rural	Belgaum	Lakshmi Hebbalkar	INC	BJP
16	Bailhongal	Belgaum	Mahantesh Koujalagi	INC	BJP
17	Saundatti Yellamma	Belgaum	Vishwas Vaidya	INC	INC
18	Ramdurg	Belgaum	Ashok Mahadevappa Pattan	INC	INC

== Members of Parliament ==
Year	Name	Party
1952-57 : See Belgaum North, Belgaum South
1957	Balvantrao Datar	Indian National Congress
1962	Balvantrao Datar	Indian National Congress
1963^	Hemanand Koujalagi	Indian National Congress
1967	N. M. Nabisab	Indian National Congress
1971	Appayappa Kotrashetti	Indian National Congress
1977	Appayappa Kotrashetti	Indian National Congress
1980	Shanmukhappa Sidnal	Indian National Congress (I)
1984	Shanmukhappa Sidnal	Indian National Congress
1989	Shanmukhappa Sidnal	Indian National Congress
1991	Shanmukhappa Sidnal	Indian National Congress
1996	Shivanand Koujalagi	Janata Dal
1998	Babagouda Patil	Bharatiya Janata Party
1999	Amarsinh Patil	Indian National Congress
2004	Suresh Angadi	Bharatiya Janata Party
2009	Suresh Angadi	Bharatiya Janata Party
2014	Suresh Angadi	Bharatiya Janata Party
2019	Suresh Angadi	Bharatiya Janata Party
2021^	Mangala Angadi	Bharatiya Janata Party
2024	Jagadish Shettar	Bharatiya Janata Party

^ by-poll

== Election results ==
=== General Election 2024 ===
2024 Indian general election: Belgaum
Party	Candidate	Votes	%	±%
BJP	Jagadish Shettar	762,029	55.06	▲11.99
INC	Mrinal Ravindra Hebbalkar	583,592	42.20	▼0.35
MES	Mahadev Patil	9,503	0.69	▼10.77
NOTA	None of the above	5,726	0.41	0.63
Majority		178,437	12.89	+12.38
Turnout		1,386,821	71.79	
BJP hold		Swing		

=== 2021 Bypoll ===
Bye-election, 2021: Belgaum
Party	Candidate	Votes	%	±%
BJP	Mangala Suresh Angadi	440,327	43.07	−19.85
INC	Satish Laxmanarao Jarkiholi	435,087	42.56	+11.80
MES	Shubham Vikrant Shelke	117,174	11.46	+11.46
NOTA	None of the above	10,631	1.04	
Majority		5,240	0.51	−31.95
Turnout		1,022,793	56.15	
BJP hold		Swing		

=== 2019 Lok Sabha ===
2019 Indian general elections: Belgaum
Party	Candidate	Votes	%	±%
BJP	Suresh Angadi	761,991	63.22	+11.69
INC	V. S. Sadhunavar	370,687	30.76	−13.72
IND.	Ganesh M. Daddikar	8,151	0.68	
BSP	Badroddin Kamdod	5,750	0.48	
Majority		391,304	32.46	
Turnout		1,207,142	67.84	
BJP hold		Swing		

=== 2014 Lok Sabha ===
2014 Indian general elections: Belgaum
Party	Candidate	Votes	%	±%
BJP	Suresh Angadi	554,417	51.53	−0.58
INC	Lakshmi Hebbalkar	478,557	44.48	+9.33
NOTA	None of the above	11,509	1.07	
AAP	Angadi Muttappa	8,524	0.79	
JD(S)	Bagwan Nasir Papulsab	5,477	0.51	−8.57
Majority		75,860	7.03	
Turnout		1,078,982	68.25	+13.50
BJP hold		Swing		

=== 2009 Lok Sabha ===
2009 Indian general elections: Belgaum
Party	Candidate	Votes	%	±%
BJP	Suresh Angadi	384,324	50.85	
INC	Amarsinh Vasantarao Patil	265,637	35.15	
JD(S)	A. B. Patil	68,594	9.08	
IND.	Hanaji Ashok Pandu	10,811	1.43	
Majority		118,687	15.70	
Turnout		754,561	54.75	−11.35
BJP hold		Swing		

=== 1984 Lok Sabha ===
- Shanmukhappa Basappa Sidnal (INC) : 202,506
- Appayyagouda Basagouda Patil (JNP) : 166,966
- Prabhakar Pawashe (Maharashytra Ekikaran Samiti) : finished third.

== See also ==
- Belgaum North Lok Sabha constituency
- Belgaum South Lok Sabha constituency
- Belagavi district
- List of constituencies of the Lok Sabha
