= Uchagaon Assembly constituency =

Former constituency in Karnataka, India

Coordinates: 15.885031°N 74.429793°E

Uchagaon
- Former constituency for the Karnataka Legislative Assembly

Constituency details
- Country: India
- Region: South India
- State: Karnataka
- Lok Sabha constituency: Belagavi
- Established: 1967
- Abolished: 2008
- Reservation: None

Uchagaon Assembly constituency was one of the 224 vidhan sabha seats in the Karnataka Legislative Assembly, in India. It was part of Belagavi Lok Sabha constituency, which is adjacent to Chikkodi Lok Sabha constituency.

== Members of the Legislative Assembly ==
Election	Member	Party
1967	N. P. Bharaman	Independent politician
1972	Pawashe Prabhakar Anapa	Independent politician
1978	Pawashe Prabhakar Anapa	Independent politician
1983	Basavant Iroli Patil	Independent politician
1985	Basavant Iroli Patil	Independent politician
1989	Basavant Iroli Patil	Independent politician
1994	Basavant Iroli Patil	Independent politician
1999	Manohar Punnappa Kadolkar	Bharatiya Janata Party
2004	Manohar Kallappa Kinekar	Independent politician

== Election results ==
=== Assembly Election 2004 ===
2004 Karnataka Legislative Assembly election : Uchagaon
Party	Candidate	Votes	%	±%
Independent	Manohar Kallappa Kinekar	42,483	32.57%	New
INC	Sambhaji Laxman Patil	31,277	23.98%	▼5.99
BJP	Shankargouda Patil	30,941	23.72%	▼10.39
SS	Sanjay B. Patil	9,990	7.66%	New
Independent	Manohar Punnappa Kadolkar	3,812	2.92%	New
JD(S)	Dhavari Ramachandra Vithal	2,367	1.81%	New
Independent	Suntakar Sanjay Yeshawant	1,819	1.39%	New
CPI	Parimala Vijaykumar	1,744	1.34%	New
Kannada Nadu Party	Telagadi Parmanand Veerbhadrappa	1,464	1.12%	New
Margin of victory		11,206	8.59%	▲6.68
Turnout		130,433	63.70%	▲3.41
Total valid votes		130,428		
Registered electors		204,760		▲16.01
Independent gain from BJP		Swing	▼1.54	

=== Assembly Election 1999 ===
1999 Karnataka Legislative Assembly election : Uchagaon
Party	Candidate	Votes	%	±%
BJP	Manohar Punnappa Kadolkar	33,990	34.11%	▲26.20
Independent	Basavant Iroli Patil	32,086	32.20%	New
INC	Kadam Yuvaraj Nagoji	29,870	29.97%	▲11.27
Independent	Narayan Mahadev Rawoot	2,961	2.97%	New
Independent	Jainoddin Imamsab Dukandar	754	0.76%	New
Margin of victory		1,904	1.91%	▼27.51
Turnout		106,412	60.29%	▲3.25
Total valid votes		99,661		
Rejected ballots		6,677	6.27%	▲4.20
Registered electors		176,503		▲14.57
BJP gain from Independent		Swing	▼14.01	

=== Assembly Election 1994 ===
1994 Karnataka Legislative Assembly election : Uchagaon
Party	Candidate	Votes	%	±%
Independent	Basavant Iroli Patil	41,416	48.12%	New
INC	Kadam Yuvaraj Nagoji	16,096	18.70%	▲0.96
JD	Rai Jayasurya Rammohan	12,420	14.43%	▲4.77
BJP	Bhagojirao Chimmanna Patil	6,809	7.91%	New
Independent	Rane Madhavrao Devadattarao	2,975	3.46%	New
Independent	Majukar Yalloji Narayan	2,806	3.26%	New
INC	Pawashe Prasad Prabhakar	1,175	1.37%	New
Independent	Lalita Mahavir Patil	809	0.94%	New
Margin of victory		25,320	29.42%	▼9.81
Turnout		87,878	57.04%	▼4.09
Total valid votes		86,061		
Rejected ballots		1,817	2.07%	▼2.64
Registered electors		154,061		▲9.66
Independent hold		Swing	▼8.85	

=== Assembly Election 1989 ===
1989 Karnataka Legislative Assembly election : Uchagaon
Party	Candidate	Votes	%	±%
Independent	Basavant Iroli Patil	46,625	56.97%	New
INC	Baburao Jotiga Pisale	14,518	17.74%	▼15.16
JP	Rai Jayasurya Rammohan	11,588	14.16%	New
JD	Dhavali Maruti Fakirappa	7,909	9.66%	New
Independent	Reddy Damodar Pandurang	845	1.03%	New
Margin of victory		32,107	39.23%	▲14.93
Turnout		85,885	61.13%	▲1.66
Total valid votes		81,840		
Rejected ballots		4,045	4.71%	▲3.51
Registered electors		140,489		▲31.57
Independent hold		Swing	▼0.23	

=== Assembly Election 1985 ===
1985 Karnataka Legislative Assembly election : Uchagaon
Party	Candidate	Votes	%	±%
Independent	Basavant Iroli Patil	35,884	57.20%	New
INC	Kutre Yellappa Kummanna	20,637	32.90%	▼5.85
JP	Shantharam Shivajirao Wesne	5,368	8.56%	▲4.83
Independent	K. Vidyasagar	615	0.98%	New
Margin of victory		15,247	24.30%	▲6.11
Turnout		63,499	59.47%	▼16.90
Total valid votes		62,734		
Rejected ballots		765	1.20%	▼0.80
Registered electors		106,778		▲8.49
Independent hold		Swing	▲0.26	

=== Assembly Election 1983 ===
1983 Karnataka Legislative Assembly election : Uchagaon
Party	Candidate	Votes	%	±%
Independent	Basavant Iroli Patil	41,940	56.94%	New
INC	Nandihalli Parashuram Bharamaji	28,544	38.75%	▲38.04
JP	Pattan Mandakin Ishwar	2,748	3.73%	▼9.49
Margin of victory		13,396	18.19%	▲6.39
Turnout		75,164	76.37%	▲1.27
Total valid votes		73,661		
Rejected ballots		1,503	2.00%	▼0.75
Registered electors		98,425		▲18.32
Independent hold		Swing	▲16.81	

=== Assembly Election 1978 ===
1978 Karnataka Legislative Assembly election : Uchagaon
Party	Candidate	Votes	%	±%
Independent	Pawashe Prabhakar Anapa	24,377	40.13%	New
Independent	Nandihalli Parashuram Bharamaji	17,207	28.32%	New
JP	Mutgekar Apparao Shartwaji	8,031	13.22%	New
INC(I)	Lokur Jeevan Buddaraya	6,359	10.47%	New
Independent	Neelkanth Chanabasappa Sutakatti	3,999	6.58%	New
INC	Kolhapuri Mohan Yeshwant	430	0.71%	▼22.90
Margin of victory		7,170	11.80%	▲3.07
Turnout		62,471	75.10%	▲19.88
Total valid votes		60,751		
Rejected ballots		1,720	2.75%	▲2.75
Registered electors		83,184		▲21.73
Independent hold		Swing	▲2.04	

=== Assembly Election 1972 ===
1972 Mysore State Legislative Assembly election : Uchagaon
Party	Candidate	Votes	%	±%
Independent	Pawashe Prabhakar Anapa	13,916	38.09%	New
Independent	K. M. Basavaneppa	10,727	29.36%	New
INC	Lokur J. Buddharaya	8,628	23.61%	▼3.70
INC(O)	V. Kaliojirao Patil	3,267	8.94%	New
Margin of victory		3,189	8.73%	▼36.66
Turnout		37,734	55.22%	▼17.82
Total valid votes		36,538		
Registered electors		68,333		▲23.43
Independent hold		Swing	▼34.60	

=== Assembly Election 1967 ===
1967 Mysore State Legislative Assembly election : Uchagaon
Party	Candidate	Votes	%	±%
Independent	N. P. Bharaman	28,066	72.69%	New
INC	B. B. Peter	10,543	27.31%	New
Margin of victory		17,523	45.39%	
Turnout		40,436	73.04%	
Total valid votes		38,609		
Registered electors		55,362		
Independent win (new seat)				
