= Hire Bagewadi Assembly constituency =

Former Assembly constituency in Karnataka, India

Coordinates: 15.774589°N 74.644923°E

Hire Bagewadi
- Former constituency No. 199 for the Karnataka Legislative Assembly

Constituency details
- Country: India
- Region: South India
- State: Karnataka
- Division: Belagavi
- District: Belagavi
- Lok Sabha constituency: Belgaum
- Established: 1967
- Abolished: 2008
- Reservation: None

Hire Bagewadi Assembly constituency was one of the constituencies in Karnataka Legislative Assembly in India until 2008 when it was made defunct. It was part of Belgaum Lok Sabha constituency.

== Members of the Legislative Assembly ==
Election	Member	Party
1967	P. C. Lingappa	Indian National Congress
1972	S. A. Patil	Indian National Congress
1978	Astekar Govind Laxman	Independent politician
1983	Astekar Govind Laxman	Independent politician
1985	Shivaputrappa Channabasappa Malagi	Janata Party
1989	Modagekar @desai Krishnarao Chudamani	Independent politician
1994	Shivaputrappa Channabasappa Malagi	Janata Dal
1999	Shivaputrappa Channabasappa Malagi	Janata Dal
2004	Abhay Bharamagouda Patil	Bharatiya Janata Party

== Election results ==
=== Assembly Election 2004 ===
2004 Karnataka Legislative Assembly election : Hire Bagewadi
Party	Candidate	Votes	%	±%
BJP	Abhay Bharamagouda Patil	32,854	27.77%	▲8.75
INC	Shivaputrappa Channabasappa Malagi	29,156	24.64%	▲0.86
Independent	Suntakar Shivaji Kedari	28,420	24.02%	New
Independent	Patil Bapugouda Shivanagouda	8,799	7.44%	New
SS	Modegekar Ashok Narayan	6,540	5.53%	New
JD(S)	Babagouda Patil	6,007	5.08%	▲0.28
Kannada Nadu Party	Dr. Hadigouda R. Patil	2,300	1.94%	New
Independent	Mahammadhanif Mahamadali Sanadi	1,384	1.17%	New
Independent	Kallappa Laxman Kambale	1,141	0.96%	New
Margin of victory		3,698	3.13%	▲2.86
Turnout		118,340	71.13%	▼1.85
Total valid votes		118,308		
Registered electors		166,380		▲13.19
BJP gain from JD(U)		Swing	▲3.42	

=== Assembly Election 1999 ===
1999 Karnataka Legislative Assembly election : Hire Bagewadi
Party	Candidate	Votes	%	±%
JD(U)	Shivaputrappa Channabasappa Malagi	24,439	24.35%	New
Independent	Pingat Yallojirao Sidarai	24,166	24.08%	New
INC	Shivashankar Somalingappa Malagali	23,870	23.78%	▲8.02
BJP	Abhay Bharamagouda Patil	19,090	19.02%	▲13.54
JD(S)	Basavant. B. Pujer	4,814	4.80%	New
Independent	Naik Appasaheb Basaprabhu	2,344	2.34%	New
Independent	Anand Balakrishna Appugol	979	0.98%	New
Independent	Jamadar Abdul-majid Goussab	657	0.65%	New
Margin of victory		273	0.27%	▼5.66
Turnout		107,274	72.98%	▲1.22
Total valid votes		100,359		
Rejected ballots		6,896	6.43%	▲3.53
Registered electors		146,997		▲12.30
JD(U) gain from JD		Swing	▼4.75	

=== Assembly Election 1994 ===
1994 Karnataka Legislative Assembly election : Hire Bagewadi
Party	Candidate	Votes	%	±%
JD	Shivaputrappa Channabasappa Malagi	26,529	29.10%	▲3.88
Independent	Astekar Govind Laxman	21,125	23.17%	New
INC	Patil Ninganagouda Basanagouda	14,370	15.76%	▲1.62
INC	Patil Sambhaji Laxman	8,632	9.47%	New
Karnataka Rajya Ryota Sangha	Mokhashi Rudrappa Veerappa	8,346	9.15%	New
Independent	Yallurkar Kisan Sidray	5,534	6.07%	New
BJP	Lingaraj. B. Patil	5,000	5.48%	New
Independent	Chavali Sangappa Faseppa	828	0.91%	New
Margin of victory		5,404	5.93%	▲5.73
Turnout		93,930	71.76%	▲0.27
Total valid votes		91,177		
Rejected ballots		2,728	2.90%	▼2.04
Registered electors		130,897		▲6.72
JD gain from Independent		Swing	▲2.45	

=== Assembly Election 1989 ===
1989 Karnataka Legislative Assembly election : Hire Bagewadi
Party	Candidate	Votes	%	±%
Independent	Modagekar @desai Krishnarao Chudamani	22,212	26.65%	New
Independent	Yallurkar Kisan Sidray	22,049	26.45%	New
JD	Shivaputrappa Channabasappa Malagi	21,025	25.22%	New
INC	Appayappa Karaveerappa Kotrasetty	11,786	14.14%	▼16.19
JP	Malagali Gangadhar Sangappa	2,591	3.11%	New
Independent	Patil Shivanagouda Bhimagouda	972	1.17%	New
Independent	Apoleon Bavtis Borges	875	1.05%	New
Independent	Kademani Chandrasekhar Veerupaxi	829	0.99%	New
Independent	Kolkar Durgappa Mailappa	607	0.73%	New
Margin of victory		163	0.20%	▼1.81
Turnout		87,686	71.49%	▲5.27
Total valid votes		83,356		
Rejected ballots		4,330	4.94%	▲2.72
Registered electors		122,659		▲29.51
Independent gain from JP		Swing	▼8.49	

=== Assembly Election 1985 ===
1985 Karnataka Legislative Assembly election : Hire Bagewadi
Party	Candidate	Votes	%	±%
JP	Shivaputrappa Channabasappa Malagi	21,553	35.14%	▲5.53
Independent	Astekar Govind Laxman	20,319	33.13%	New
INC	Appayappa Karaveerappa Kotrasetty	18,603	30.33%	▲2.50
Independent	Omanna Kalappa Chowghle	853	1.39%	New
Margin of victory		1,234	2.01%	▼5.58
Turnout		62,718	66.22%	▼5.53
Total valid votes		61,328		
Rejected ballots		1,390	2.22%	▼0.43
Registered electors		94,712		▲15.37
JP gain from Independent		Swing	▼2.06	

=== Assembly Election 1983 ===
1983 Karnataka Legislative Assembly election : Hire Bagewadi
Party	Candidate	Votes	%	±%
Independent	Astekar Govind Laxman	21,333	37.20%	New
JP	Patil Ninganagouda Basanagouda	16,981	29.61%	▲7.79
INC	Yeligar Devendra Keshappa	15,955	27.83%	▲16.09
LKD	Patil Shivanagouda Channagouda Alias Kundarnad Patil	2,000	3.49%	New
Independent	Tukkar Ningappa Yallappa	489	0.85%	New
Independent	Naik Maruti Bhima	415	0.72%	New
Margin of victory		4,352	7.59%	▲0.74
Turnout		58,898	71.75%	▲0.25
Total valid votes		57,340		
Rejected ballots		1,558	2.65%	▼0.72
Registered electors		82,091		▲8.10
Independent hold		Swing	▲1.93	

=== Assembly Election 1978 ===
1978 Karnataka Legislative Assembly election : Hire Bagewadi
Party	Candidate	Votes	%	±%
Independent	Astekar Govind Laxman	18,507	35.27%	New
INC(I)	Malagali Gangadhar Sangappa	14,915	28.43%	New
JP	Balekundri Basalingu Shivshankar	11,449	21.82%	New
INC	Patil Balasaheb Bharamanna	6,162	11.74%	▼26.83
Independent	Malagali Shidalingappa Appanna	997	1.90%	New
Independent	Madanalli Gurappa Balappa	438	0.83%	New
Margin of victory		3,592	6.85%	▼6.13
Turnout		54,299	71.50%	▲7.72
Total valid votes		52,468		
Rejected ballots		1,831	3.37%	▲3.37
Registered electors		75,939		▲14.56
Independent gain from INC		Swing	▼3.30	

=== Assembly Election 1972 ===
1972 Mysore State Legislative Assembly election : Hire Bagewadi
Party	Candidate	Votes	%	±%
INC	S. A. Patil	15,621	38.57%	▼54.84
INC(O)	M. B. Patil	10,362	25.58%	New
Independent	Kutre Gurunath Maryappa	8,693	21.46%	New
Independent	N. Annappagodda Patil	890	2.20%	New
Margin of victory		5,259	12.98%	▼26.71
Turnout		42,276	63.78%	▲12.03
Total valid votes		40,504		
Registered electors		66,289		▲15.83
INC hold		Swing	▼54.84	

=== Assembly Election 1967 ===
1967 Mysore State Legislative Assembly election : Hire Bagewadi
Party	Candidate	Votes	%	±%
INC	P. C. Lingappa	26,092	93.41%	New
Independent	K. M. Basawani	15,005	53.72%	New
Independent	K. G. Mareppa	481	1.72%	New
Independent	R. M. Gurunath	229	0.82%	New
Margin of victory		11,087	39.69%	
Turnout		29,617	51.75%	
Total valid votes		27,932		
Registered electors		57,230		
INC win (new seat)				

== See also ==
- List of constituencies of the Karnataka Legislative Assembly
