= Chikkodi Lok Sabha constituency =

Lok Sabha constituency in Karnataka

Coordinates: 16.4°N 74.6°E

Chikkodi
- Lok Sabha constituency
- Chikkodi Lok Sabha Constituency Map

Constituency details
- Country: India
- Region: South India
- State: Karnataka
- Assembly constituencies: Nippani; Chikkodi-Sadalga; Athani; Kagawad; Kudachi; Raibag; Hukkeri; Yemkanmardi
- Established: 1957
- Reservation: None

Member of Parliament
- 18th Lok Sabha
- Incumbent Priyanka Satish Jarkiholi
- Party: Indian National Congress
- Elected year: 2024

Chikkodi Lok Sabha constituency (Kannada: ಚಿಕ್ಕೋಡಿ ಲೋಕ ಸಭೆ ಚುನಾವಣಾ ಕ್ಷೇತ್ರ) is one of the 28 Lok Sabha constituencies in Karnataka in southern India. It's constituency number is 1 in the list of Lok Sabha constituencies of Karnataka.

== Assembly segments ==
Presently, Chikkodi Lok Sabha constituency comprises the following eight Legislative Assembly segments:

No	Name	District	Member	Party	Party Leading (in 2024)
1	Nippani	Belagavi	Shashikala Jolle	BJP	INC
2	Chikkodi-Sadalga	Belagavi	Ganesh Hukkeri	INC	INC
3	Athani	Belagavi	Laxman Savadi	INC	BJP
4	Kagawad	Belagavi	Raju Kage	INC	INC
5	Kudachi (SC)	Belagavi	Mahendra Tammannavar	INC	INC
6	Raibag (SC)	Belagavi	Duryodhan Aihole	BJP	INC
7	Hukkeri	Belagavi	Nikhil Katti	BJP	BJP
10	Yemkanmardi (ST)	Belagavi	Satish Jarkiholi	INC	INC

== Members of Parliament ==
Year	Name	Party
1952–57 : See Belgaum North
1957	Datta Appa Katti	Scheduled Castes Federation
1962	V. L. Patil	Indian National Congress
1967	B. Shankaranand	Indian National Congress
1971	B. Shankaranand	Indian National Congress
1977	B. Shankaranand	Indian National Congress
1980	B. Shankaranand	Indian National Congress (I)
1984	B. Shankaranand	Indian National Congress
1989	B. Shankaranand	Indian National Congress
1991	B. Shankaranand	Indian National Congress
1996	Ratnamala Savanur	Janata Dal
1998	Ramesh Jigajinagi	Lok Shakti
1999	Ramesh Jigajinagi	Janata Dal (United)
2004	Ramesh Jigajinagi	Bharatiya Janata Party
2009	Ramesh Katti	Bharatiya Janata Party
2014	Prakash Hukkeri	Indian National Congress
2019	Annasaheb Jolle	Bharatiya Janata Party
2024	Priyanka Jarkiholi	Indian National Congress

== Election results ==
=== General election 2024 ===
2024 Indian general elections: Chikkodi
Party	Candidate	Votes	%	±%
INC	Priyanka Satish Jarkiholi	713,461	51.21	
BJP	Annasaheb Shankar Jolle	6,22,627	44.69	
Independent	Kallolikar Shambhu Krishna	25,466	1.83	
Majority		90,834	6.52	
Turnout		13,95,325	78.81	
INC gain from BJP		Swing		

=== General election 2019 ===
2019 Indian general elections: Chikkodi
Party	Candidate	Votes	%	±%
BJP	Annasaheb Shankar Jolle	645,017	53.0	
INC	Prakash Babanna Hukkeri	5,26,140	43.2	
BSP	Machendra Davalu Kadapure	15,575	1.3	
Majority		1,18,877	9.76	
Turnout		12,19,483	75.62	
BJP gain from INC		Swing		

=== General election 2014 ===
2014 Indian general elections: Chikkodi
Party	Candidate	Votes	%	±%
INC	Prakash Babanna Hukkeri	474,373	44.72	
BJP	Ramesh Vishwanath Katti	4,71,370	44.43	
NCP	Prataparao Patil	42,738	4.03	
JD(S)	Shrimant Balasaheb Patil	39,992	3.77	
Majority		3,003	0.28	
Turnout		10,71,495	74.30	
INC gain from BJP		Swing		

=== General election 2009 ===
2009 Indian general elections: Chikkodi
Party	Candidate	Votes	%	±%
BJP	Ramesh Vishwanath Katti	438,081	50.48	
INC	Prakash Babanna Hukkeri	3,82,794	44.11	
BSP	Shivanand Wantamuri Siddamallappa	19,762	2.28	
Majority		55,287	6.37	
Turnout		8,67,802	67.56	
BJP hold		Swing		

=== General election 2004 ===
2004 Indian general elections: Chikkodi
Party	Candidate	Votes	%	±%
BJP	Ramesh Chandappa Jigajinagi	379,580	45.30	
INC	Ghatage S. B.	3,36,088	40.11	
JD(S)	Khokate Shivabal Ramachandra	66,671	7.96	
BSP	M. Gopinath	29,275	3.49	
Majority		43,492	5.19	
Turnout		8,38,208	70.78	
BJP gain from JD(U)		Swing		

== See also ==
- Belgaum North Lok Sabha constituency
- Belgaum South Lok Sabha constituency
- Belgaum district
- List of constituencies of the Lok Sabha
