= Ganesh Hukkeri =

Indian politician (born 1978)

Member of Karnataka Legislative Assembly
- Incumbent
- Assumed office 26 August 2014
- Preceded by: Prakash Babanna Hukkeri
- Constituency: Chikkodi-Sadalga

Personal details
- Born: 24 July 1978 (age 48) Chikkodi, Karnataka, India
- Party: Indian National Congress
- Spouse: Swapnali Hukkeri
- Children: 2
- Parent: Prakash Babanna Hukkeri (father)
- Education: Karnatak University, Dharwad (B.B.A.)
- Occupation: Social Worker

Ganesh Hukkeri (born 24 July 1978) is an Indian politician from Karnataka. He is a three-time member of the Karnataka Legislative Assembly. He won the 2023 Karnataka Legislative Assembly Election representing Indian National Congress from Chikkodi-Sadalga Assembly Constituency.

== Early life and education ==
Ganesh was born to Prakash Babanna Hukkeri in Belagavi. His father Babanna was a Member of Legislative Council and former Cabinet Minister of Sugar, Small Business and Charity, Karnataka. He is a graduate. He holds Bachelor of Business Administration degree from Bharatesh College of Business Administration in Belagavi. He married Swapnali Hukkeri and has two children.

== Career ==
Ganesh started his political career as Belagavi Zilla Parishad member from the Examba constituency. He defeated Shashikala Annasaheb Jolle, who is now a sitting MLA from Nippani Assembly Constituency.

His father who won the 2013 Karnataka Legislative Assembly election from Chikkodi-Sadalga resigned the seat in 2014 after he was elected to the Lok Sabha. In the bypoll held in 2014, Ganesh, his son was nominated by the Indian National Congress Party and he defeated the BJP candidate Mahantesh Kavatagimath (MLC) by more than 33,000 votes. In September 2016, Hukkeri was appointed a parliamentary secretary in the Revenue Department of Karnataka as a special power of the Chief Minister of Karnataka.

He was elected for the second time in May 2018 defeating Annasaheb Jolle of BJP in the 2018 Karnataka Legislative Assembly election by a margin of 10,569 votes. Later, Hukkeri was appointed the Chief Whip of the Government of Karnataka.

In the 2023 Karnataka Legislative Assembly election Hukkeri won for the third time by defeating Ex.MP and DCC Bank Chairman Ramesh Vishwanath Katti by record breaking margin of 78500 votes. He won by second highest margin of victory after D. K. Shivakumar. He declared assets worth Rs.12.13 crore in the election affidavit. He also served as Director of Karnataka Sugar Federation and current Director of District Co-op Bank Belgavi.
