= Prakash Hukkeri =

Indian politician

Karnataka Legislative Council
- Incumbent
- Assumed office 13 June 2022
- Preceded by: Arun Shahapur
- Constituency: North-West Teachers

Member of Parliament
- In office 26 May 2014 – 23 May 2019
- Preceded by: Ramesh Vishwanath Katti
- Succeeded by: Annasaheb Jolle
- Constituency: Chikkodi (Lok Sabha constituency)

Minister for Small Scale Industries, Sugar and Endowments, Government of Karnataka
- In office 17 May 2013 – 26 May 2014

Karnataka Legislative Assembly
- In office 25 May 2008 – 26 May 2014
- Preceded by: Position Established
- Succeeded by: Ganesh Hukkeri
- Constituency: Chikkodi-Sadalga

Personal details
- Born: Prakash Babbanna Hukkeri; 5 March 1947 (age 79) Chikkodi, Mysuru State, British India (present–day Karnataka, India)
- Party: Indian National Congress
- Spouse: Neelambika
- Relations: Ganesh Hukkeri (Son)
- Education: J.A.Composite Pre-university college, Belagavi
- Profession: Politician

Prakash Babanna Hukkeri is a Member of Karnataka Legislative Council from North-West Teachers Constituency. He got elected in June 2022, also he was a Member of Parliament in the Lok Sabha (2014–19) representing Chikkodi constituency for the Congress Party. He is a State Vice President of the Indian National Congress Karnataka. He was a member of the Karnataka Legislative Assembly, the minister for Small scale Industries, Sugar and Endowments and the minister in charge for Haveri District in the Government of Karnataka. Hukkeri Belongs to the Panchamsali Lingayat Community.

== Karnataka Legislative Assembly election, 2013 ==
He was elected to Karnataka Legislative Assembly in the 2013 election from Chikkodi-Sadalga constituency with 1,02,237 votes. He also won in 2008 assembly elections from the same constituency.
