= Kuppanawadi =

- Village
- Country: India
- State: Karnataka
- District: Belgaum
- Talukas: Chikodi

Population (2001)
  - Total: 1,100

Languages
  - Official: Kannada
- Time zone: UTC+5:30 (IST)
- Postal code: 591287
- ISO 3166 code: IN-KA

Kuppanawadi is a village in Belgaum district in Karnataka, India.
