= Galatga =

- Village
- Location in Karnataka, India Galatga (India)
- Coordinates: 16°29′37.514″N 74°28′17.552″E
- Country: India
- State: Karnataka
- District: Belgaum
- Talukas: chikodi

Population (2001)
  - Total: 15,000

Languages
  - Official: Kannada
- Time zone: UTC+5:30 (IST)
- Postal code: 591219
- Telephone code: 08338
- Vehicle registration: 23
- Nearest city: Nipani, Kolhapur
- Lok Sabha constituency: Chikkodi
- Vidhan Sabha constituency: Nipani

Galatga is a village in the southern state of Karnataka, India. It is in the Nipani Taluk of Belgaum district in Karnataka.

== Demographics ==
At the 2001 India census, Galatga had a population of 15,000 with 7800 males and 7200 females.

== See also ==
- Belgaum
- Districts of Karnataka
