= Donawad =

- Village
- Country: India
- State: Karnataka
- District: Belgaum

Languages
  - Official: Kannada
- Time zone: UTC+5:30 (IST)

Donawad is a village in Belgaum district in the southern state of Karnataka, India.

The village is about 15 km away from the Taluka headquarters Chikodi and has a population of about 1500 people. The main economic activity is agriculture, especially sugar cane, and several sugar factories are within 40 km of the village.
