= Hukkeri Assembly constituency =

Legislative Assembly constituency in Karnataka, India

Coordinates: 16.23°N 74.60°E

Hukkeri
- Constituency No. 7 for the Karnataka Legislative Assembly

Constituency details
- Country: India
- Region: South India
- State: Karnataka
- District: Belgaum
- Lok Sabha constituency: Chikkodi
- Established: 1951
- Total electors: 208,204
- Reservation: None

Member of Legislative Assembly
- 16th Karnataka Legislative Assembly
- Incumbent Nikhil Umesh Katti
- Party: Bharatiya Janata Party
- Elected year: 2023
- Preceded by: Umesh Katti

Hukkeri Assembly constituency is one of the 224 constituencies in the Karnataka Legislative Assembly of Karnataka, a southern state of India. Hukkeri is also part of Chikkodi Lok Sabha constituency.

== Members of the Legislative Assembly ==
Election	Member	Party
1952	Malgouda Punagouda Patil	Indian National Congress
1957	Malgouda Punagouda Patil	Indian National Congress
1957	Bhogale Champabai Piraji	Indian National Congress
1962	Satigouda Satagouda Patil	Indian National Congress
1967	Appanngouda Bagewadi	Indian National Congress
1972	Virupaxappa Basappa Nooli	Indian National Congress
1978	Maha Janashetti Shivayogi Shivalingappa	Indian National Congress
1983	Desai Alagoud Basaprabhu	Indian National Congress
1985	Vishwanath Mallappa Katti	Janata Party
1985 By-election (Note: Due to Death of Vishwanath Mallappa Katti)	Umesh Katti	Janata Party
1989	Umesh Katti	Janata Dal
1994	Umesh Katti	Janata Dal
1999	Umesh Katti	Janata Dal
2004	Shashikanth Akkappa Naik	Bharatiya Janata Party
2008	Umesh Katti	Janata Dal
2013	Umesh Katti	Bharatiya Janata Party
2018	Umesh Katti	Bharatiya Janata Party
2023	Nikhil Umesh Katti	Bharatiya Janata Party

== Election results ==
=== Assembly Election 2023 ===
2023 Karnataka Legislative Assembly election : Hukkeri
Party	Candidate	Votes	%	±%
BJP	Nikhil Umesh Katti	103,574	61.69	▲8.75
INC	Appayyagouda Basagouda Patil	61,023	36.34	▼6.86
NOTA	None of the above	1,168	0.70	▼0.46
Margin of victory		42,551	25.34	▲15.60
Turnout		168,456	80.91	▼0.11
Total valid votes		167,903		
Registered electors		208,204		▲6.83
BJP hold		Swing	▲8.75	

=== Assembly Election 2018 ===
2018 Karnataka Legislative Assembly election : Hukkeri
Party	Candidate	Votes	%	±%
BJP	Umesh Katti	83,588	52.94	▼8.59
INC	Appayyagouda Basagouda Patil	68,203	43.20	▲24.79
NOTA	None of the above	1,830	1.16	New
JD(S)	Mallikarjun Babagoud Patil	1,426	0.90	▼13.77
Independent	Sanjeev B. Magadum	1,064	0.67	New
Margin of victory		15,385	9.74	▼33.37
Turnout		157,891	81.02	▲5.15
Total valid votes		157,887		
Registered electors		194,888		▲11.01
BJP hold		Swing	▼8.59	

=== Assembly Election 2013 ===
2013 Karnataka Legislative Assembly election : Hukkeri
Party	Candidate	Votes	%	±%
BJP	Umesh Katti	81,810	61.53	▲52.44
INC	Ravi Basavaraj Karale	24,484	18.41	▼17.81
JD(S)	Basavaraj Kashappa Matagar	19,501	14.67	▼35.53
KJP	Ningappa Basanaik Barigidad	3,058	2.30	New
NPP	Suresh Kallappa Manavaddar	1,780	1.34	New
BSP	Rajendra Babu Moshi	1,354	1.02	▼0.47
BSRCP	Virupakshi Basappa Marennavar	974	0.73	New
Margin of victory		57,326	43.11	▲29.13
Turnout		133,196	75.87	▼4.51
Total valid votes		132,961		
Registered electors		175,565		▲11.80
BJP gain from JD(S)		Swing	▲11.33	

=== Assembly Election 2008 ===
2008 Karnataka Legislative Assembly election : Hukkeri
Party	Candidate	Votes	%	±%
JD(S)	Umesh Katti	63,328	50.20	▲48.53
INC	Appayyagouda Basagouda Patil	45,692	36.22	▼10.21
BJP	Shashikanth Akkappa Naik	11,463	9.09	▼38.17
BSP	Basavaraj Malagouda Patil	1,886	1.49	▼1.38
Independent	Prabhakar Lagamanna Megenni	1,470	1.17	New
Independent	Panduranga Laxman Jadhav	886	0.70	New
Margin of victory		17,636	13.98	▲13.15
Turnout		126,230	80.38	▲3.34
Total valid votes		126,155		
Registered electors		157,040		▲21.72
JD(S) gain from BJP		Swing	▲2.94	

=== Assembly Election 2004 ===
2004 Karnataka Legislative Assembly election : Hukkeri
Party	Candidate	Votes	%	±%
BJP	Shashikanth Akkappa Naik	46,969	47.26	New
INC	Umesh Vishwanath Hatti	46,148	46.43	▲2.83
BSP	Shivagouda Ramagouda Patil	2,855	2.87	New
JD(S)	Malagouda Basappa Nerali	1,659	1.67	▲0.79
RPI	Mallikarjun Jayaram	1,061	1.07	New
Kannada Nadu Party	Udoshi Mohan Basavanneppa	698	0.70	New
Margin of victory		821	0.83	▼10.13
Turnout		99,390	77.04	▼2.00
Total valid votes		99,390		
Registered electors		129,017		▲8.57
BJP gain from JD(U)		Swing	▼7.29	

=== Assembly Election 1999 ===
1999 Karnataka Legislative Assembly election : Hukkeri
Party	Candidate	Votes	%	±%
JD(U)	Umesh Katti	49,699	54.55	New
INC	Patil. D. T	39,717	43.60	▲33.80
BRP	Nagappa Auvappa Awubaigol	879	0.96	New
JD(S)	Shakunthala Kariappa Naik	806	0.88	New
Margin of victory		9,982	10.96	▼18.12
Turnout		93,924	79.04	▲2.08
Total valid votes		91,101		
Rejected ballots		2,823	3.01	▲0.89
Registered electors		118,828		▲12.78
JD(U) gain from JD		Swing	▲5.00	

=== Assembly Election 1994 ===
1994 Karnataka Legislative Assembly election : Hukkeri
Party	Candidate	Votes	%	±%
JD	Umesh Katti	39,294	49.55	▲10.09
KRRS	Shashikanth Akkappa Naik	16,231	20.47	New
BJP	Amarasinh Vasantarao Patil	12,240	15.44	New
INC	Muragesh Rudrappa Dhapalapur	7,774	9.80	▼18.91
INC	Pathan Paraveenabi Kashimaab	2,203	2.78	New
SJP	P. Fazal Rehaman	642	0.81	New
Margin of victory		23,063	29.08	▲18.33
Turnout		81,085	76.96	▲3.85
Total valid votes		79,299		
Rejected ballots		1,715	2.12	▼4.19
Registered electors		105,359		▲5.26
JD hold		Swing	▲10.09	

=== Assembly Election 1989 ===
1989 Karnataka Legislative Assembly election : Hukkeri
Party	Candidate	Votes	%	±%
JD	Umesh Katti	27,056	39.46	New
INC	Murugesh Rudrappa Dhapalapur (Tarali)	19,685	28.71	▲0.45
Kranti Sabha	Shashikanth Akkappa Naik	19,644	28.65	New
JP	Attar Abdul Salam Sultan Sab	1,122	1.64	New
Independent	Shankar Shivappa Donwad	1,050	1.53	New
Margin of victory		7,371	10.75	▼30.84
Turnout		73,178	73.11	
Total valid votes		68,557		
Rejected ballots		4,621	6.31	
Registered electors		100,090		
JD gain from JP		Swing	▼30.39	

=== Assembly By-election 1985 ===
1985 Karnataka Legislative Assembly by-election : Hukkeri
Party	Candidate	Votes	%	±%
JP	Umesh Katti	37,234	69.85	▲13.68
INC	M. S. S. Shivalingappa	15,066	28.26	▼5.97
Independent	K. K. Balappa	503	0.94	New
Margin of victory		22,168	41.59	▲19.65
Total valid votes		53,305		
JP hold		Swing	▲13.68	

=== Assembly Election 1985 ===
1985 Karnataka Legislative Assembly election : Hukkeri
Party	Candidate	Votes	%	±%
JP	Vishwanath Mallappa Katti	32,713	56.17	▲13.62
INC	Balagoud Goudappa Patil	19,936	34.23	▼10.06
Independent	H. V. Gopalasetty	3,958	6.80	New
Independent	Gangappa Sambappa Chambar (Kambale)	713	1.22	New
Independent	Kotabagi Kempanna Balappa	422	0.72	New
Margin of victory		12,777	21.94	▲20.20
Turnout		59,289	75.04	▲9.00
Total valid votes		58,239		
Rejected ballots		1,050	1.77	▼1.11
Registered electors		79,011		▲7.63
JP gain from INC		Swing	▲11.88	

=== Assembly Election 1983 ===
1983 Karnataka Legislative Assembly election : Hukkeri
Party	Candidate	Votes	%	±%
INC	Desai Alagoud Basaprabhu	20,855	44.29	▲38.98
JP	Maha Janashetti Shivayogi Shivalingappa	20,034	42.55	▲2.01
Independent	Mastiholi Mahaninagappa Chigappa	1,992	4.23	New
BJP	Shivaputra Basappa Katti	1,909	4.05	New
IC(S)	Nadaf Nabisab Moulasab	1,417	3.01	New
Margin of victory		821	1.74	▼10.55
Turnout		48,480	66.04	▼5.90
Total valid votes		47,084		
Rejected ballots		1,396	2.88	▼0.19
Registered electors		73,411		▲6.16
INC gain from INC(I)		Swing	▼8.53	

=== Assembly Election 1978 ===
1978 Karnataka Legislative Assembly election : Hukkeri
Party	Candidate	Votes	%	±%
INC(I)	Maha Janashetti Shivayogi Shivalingappa	25,471	52.82	New
JP	Virupaxappa Basappa Nooli	19,547	40.54	New
INC	Sollapure Appann Nemanna	2,559	5.31	▼39.24
Independent	Kotabagi Kempanna Balappa	643	1.33	New
Margin of victory		5,924	12.29	▲8.63
Turnout		49,748	71.94	▲8.12
Total valid votes		48,220		
Rejected ballots		1,528	3.07	▲3.07
Registered electors		69,150		▲8.21
INC(I) gain from INC(O)		Swing	▲4.60	

=== Assembly Election 1972 ===
1972 Mysore State Legislative Assembly election : Hukkeri
Party	Candidate	Votes	%	±%
INC(O)	Virupaxappa Basappa Nooli	19,079	48.22	New
INC	S. H. Utubuddi Peepzade	17,629	44.55	▼7.27
SWA	B. G. Getannavar	1,243	3.14	New
Independent	Lagama Rama Naik	889	2.25	New
ABJS	B. V. Mathapati	729	1.84	New
Margin of victory		1,450	3.66	▼4.76
Turnout		40,784	63.82	▲3.25
Total valid votes		39,569		
Registered electors		63,903		▲18.85
INC(O) gain from INC		Swing	▼3.60	

=== Assembly Election 1967 ===
1967 Mysore State Legislative Assembly election : Hukkeri
Party	Candidate	Votes	%	±%
INC	Appanngouda Bagewadi	15,933	51.82	▼17.54
Independent	M. S. S. Shivalingappa	13,345	43.40	New
Independent	G. B. Ghulappa	1,469	4.78	New
Margin of victory		2,588	8.42	▼30.30
Turnout		32,567	60.57	▲6.56
Total valid votes		30,747		
Registered electors		53,768		▲16.71
INC hold		Swing	▼17.54	

=== Assembly Election 1962 ===
1962 Mysore State Legislative Assembly election : Hukkeri
Party	Candidate	Votes	%	±%
INC	Satigouda Satagouda Patil	16,161	69.36	▲6.08
PSP	Virupaxappa Chanabasappa Heddurshetti	7,139	30.64	New
Margin of victory		9,022	38.72	▲23.36
Turnout		24,880	54.01	▲2.58
Total valid votes		23,300		
Registered electors		46,068		▼46.28
INC hold		Swing	▲35.67	

=== Assembly Election 1957 ===
1957 Mysore State Legislative Assembly election : Hukkeri
Party	Candidate	Votes	%	±%
INC	Malgouda Punagouda Patil	29,716	33.69	▼35.53
INC	Bhogale Champabai Piraji	26,097	29.59	▼39.63
Independent	Bapusaheb Nanasaheb Patil	16,172	18.33	New
SCF	Tipakurle Bandopant Dhondiram	13,812	15.66	New
Independent	Malange Appaji Lagama	2,407	2.73	New
Margin of victory		13,544	15.36	▼28.53
Turnout		88,204	51.43	▼15.75
Total valid votes		88,204		
Registered electors		85,751		▲62.31
INC hold		Swing	▼35.53	

=== Assembly Election 1952 ===
1952 Bombay State Legislative Assembly election : Hukkeri
Party	Candidate	Votes	%	±%
INC	Malgouda Punagouda Patil	24,568	69.22	New
KMPP	Kalagouda Balasaheb Patil	8,990	25.33	New
Independent	Sidramgouda Satagouda Patil	1,934	5.45	New
Margin of victory		15,578	43.89	
Turnout		35,492	67.18	
Total valid votes		35,492		
Registered electors		52,831		
INC win (new seat)				

== See also ==
- Hukkeri
- Belagavi district
- Chikkodi Lok Sabha constituency
- List of constituencies of Karnataka Legislative Assembly
