= Itnal =

- Village
- Country: India
- State: Karnataka
- District: Belagavi
- Talukas: Chikodi

Languages
  - Official: Kannada
- Time zone: UTC+5:30 (IST)

Itnal is a village in Belagavi district in the southern state of Karnataka, India.
