= Jaganur =

Village in Karnataka, India

- Village
- Location in Karnataka, India Jaganur (India)
- Coordinates: 16.42°N 74.58°E
- Country: India
- State: Karnataka
- District: Belgaum
- Talukas: Chikodi

Population (2001)
  - Total: 5,661

Kannada, Marathi, English, Hindi
  - Official: Kannada
- Time zone: UTC+5:30 (IST)
- Postal code: 591305

Jaganur is a village in the southern state of Karnataka, India. It is located in the Chikodi taluk of Belgaum district in Karnataka.

== Demographics ==
As of 2001 India census, Jaganur had a population of 5661 with 2915 males and 2746 females. PIN CODE -591305

== See also ==
- Belgaum
- Districts of Karnataka
