= Janwad =

Village in Karnataka, India

Coordinates: 23°08′N 73°57′E

- Village
- Interactive map of Janwad
- Country: India
- State: Karnataka
- District: Belgaum
- Talukas: Chikodi

Languages
  - Official: Kannada
- Time zone: UTC+5:30 (IST)

Janwad is a village in Belgaum district in the southern state of Karnataka, India. The village has a matha called Shree Mahadev Swami Dharmar Math. Once in year a huge festival cum Yatra took place on the name of Lord Mahadev Swami Yarta Janwad. The village has a significant sugar cane crop.
