= Adi, Chikkodi =

Adi
- Village
- Interactive map of Adi
- Coordinates: 16.4949°N 74.3721°E
- Country: India
- State: Karnataka
- District: Belgaum
- Talukas: Chikodi

Government
  - Type: Panchayat raj
  - Body: Gram panchayat

Languages
  - Official: Kannada
- Time zone: UTC+5:30 (IST)
- ISO 3166 code: IN-KA
- Vehicle registration: KA
- Website: karnataka.gov.in

Adi (Karnataka) is a village in Belgaum district in the southern state of Karnataka, India.
