= Chandur, Karnataka =

Chandur
- Village
- Country: India
- State: Karnataka
- District: Belagavi
- Named for: Krishna River
- Talukas: Chikodi

Government
  - Type: Panchayat raj
  - Body: Gram panchayat

Population (2014)
  - Total: 6,828

Languages
  - Official: Kannada, Marathi
- Time zone: UTC+5:30 (IST)
- Postal code: 591213
- ISO 3166 code: IN-KA
- Vehicle registration: KA
- Website: karnataka.gov.in

Chandur, Karnataka is a village in Belagavi district in the southern state of Karnataka, India.
