= Hadnal =

- Village
- Country: India
- State: Karnataka
- District: Belgaum
- Talukas: Chikodi

Languages
  - Official: Kannada
- Time zone: UTC+5:30 (IST)
- Postal code: 591241

Hadnal is a village in Belagavi district in the south-western state of Karnataka, India.
