= Nagaramunnoli =

- Village
- Location in Karnataka, India Nagaramunnoli (India)
- Coordinates: 16.42°N 74.58°E
- Country: India
- State: Karnataka
- District: Belgaum
- Talukas: Chikodi

Population (2001)
  - Total: 5,453

Languages
  - Official: Kannada
- Time zone: UTC+5:30 (IST)

Nagaramunnoli is a village in the southern state of Karnataka, India. It is located in the Chikodi taluk of Belgaum district in Karnataka.

== Demographics ==
As of 2011 India census, Nagaramunnoli had a population of 10800 with 5600 males and 5200 females.

== See also ==
- Belgaum
- Districts of Karnataka
