= Appachiwadi =

- Village
- Location in Karnataka, India Appachiwadi (India)
- Coordinates: 16°29′1.04″N 74°18′16.61″E
- Country: India
- State: Karnataka
- District: Belgaum
- Talukas: Nipani

Languages
  - Official: Kannada and Marathi
- Time zone: UTC+5:30 (IST)
- Postal code: 591241
- Vehicle registration: KA 23
- Nearest city: kagal(Maharashtra)& Nipani (Karnataka)

Appachiwadi is a village in Belgaum district in the southern state of Karnataka, India.
