= Mattiwade =

- Village
- मत्तिवडे
- Nickname: sugarcane farmers village
- Location in Karnataka, India Mattiwade (India)
- Coordinates: 16.317833°N 74.386024°E
- Country: India
- State: Karnataka
- District: Belgaum
- Established: ब्रिटिश काळापासून
- Founder: Maratha Warriors
- Talukas: Nipani

Government
  - Type: ग्रामपंचायत
  - Body: ग्रामपंचायत

Population (2011)
  - Total: 2,500
- Demonym: महाराष्ट्रीयन

Languages
  - Official: Marathi
- Time zone: UTC+5:30 (IST)
- Postal code: 591229
- Vehicle registration: MH 09

Mattiwade is a village in Belgaum district of Karnataka, India.
