= Soundalga =

- Village
- Location in Karnataka, India Soundalga (India)
- Coordinates: 16.42°N 74.58°E
- Country: India
- State: Karnataka
- District: Belgaum
- Talukas: Nipani

Government
  - Type: Panchayat raj

Population (2017)
  - Total: 12,000

Languages
  - Official: Marathi, English, Hindi & Kannada
- Time zone: UTC+5:30 (IST)
- Postal code: 591241

Soundalga is a village located on the Mumbai- Bangalore Highway between Nippani and Kagal in Karnataka, India. It is in the Chikodi taluka of Belgaum district. Even though it is located on the Karnataka side of Maharashtra-Karnataka border, Marathi is the main language.

Compared to typical villages in India, Soundalga is much more developed with good infrastructure such as concrete/tar roads, water supply to every house, electricity, bus connectivity being on the highway, school, banks with ATM.

Soundalga has fertile land as one can see the greenery all 12 months while driving on the highway.

It is a hub of onion seed and onion production due to the efforts taken by Shri Subarao Kulkarni.

It has high literacy and has produced many gold medalists, engineers, doctors, PHDs, other professionals and sport personalities who have excelled at national and international levels. They have been rankers of Pune, Mumbai SSC, HSC board merit lists and working in multinational companies in Hindustan and abroad.

== Demographics ==
At the 2001 India census, Soundalga had a population of 6207 with 3155 males and 3052 females.

== See also ==
- Belgaum
- Districts of Karnataka
