= Kadapur =

- Village
- Location in Karnataka, India Kadapur (India)
- Coordinates: 16.42°N 74.58°E
- Country: India
- State: Karnataka
- District: Belgaum
- Talukas: Chikodi

Population (2001)
  - Total: 5,151

Languages
  - Official: Kannada
- Time zone: UTC+5:30 (IST)

Kadapur is a village in the southern state of Karnataka, India. It is located in the Chikodi taluk of Belgaum district in Karnataka.

== Demographics ==
As of 2001 India census, Kadapur had a population of 5151 with 2638 males and 2513 females.

== See also ==
- Belgaum
- Districts of Karnataka
