= Hanabarawadi =

Village in Karnataka, India

- Village
- Country: India
- State: Karnataka
- District: Belgaum
- Talukas: Chikodi

Languages
  - Official: Kannada
- Time zone: UTC+5:30 (IST)

Hanbarwadi is a village in Belgaum district in the southern state of Karnataka, India.

Hanbarwadi has a population of around 1000. This village is a part of Kognolli Gram panchayat. The caste prevailing in the village is Hanbar. Hanbarwadi has two temples, one is of Hanuman and other one is of Lakshmi. Mallikarjun temple is about 2 km from the village. The famous Datta Mandir is about 1.5 km from the village.
