= Nainglaj =

- Village
- Country: India
- State: Karnataka
- District: Belgaum
- Talukas: Chikodi

Population (2001)
  - Total: 10,000

Languages
  - Official: Kannada
- Time zone: UTC+5:30 (IST)
- Postal code: 591238

Nainglaj is a village in Belgaum district in the southwestern state of Karnataka, India.
