= Koganoli =

Village in Karnataka, India

Koganoli Kognoli
- Village
- Location in Karnataka, India Koganoli (India)
- Coordinates: 16°32′29.163″N 74°19′45.786″E
- Country: India
- State: Karnataka
- District: Belgaum
- Talukas: Chikodi

Population (2001)
  - Total: 9,118

Languages
  - Official: Kannada
- Time zone: UTC+5:30 (IST)
- Postal codes: 591229, 591215

Koganoli is a village in the southern state of Karnataka, India. It is located in the Chikodi taluk of Belgaum district in Karnataka.

== Demographics ==
As of 2001 India census, Koganoli had a population of 9118 with 4587 males and 4531 females.

== See also ==
- Belgaum
- Districts of Karnataka
