= Padlihal =

- Village
- Location in Karnataka, India Padlihal (India)
- Coordinates: 16°26′59.62″N 74°23′54.11″E
- Country: India
- State: Karnataka
- District: Belgaum
- Talukas: Chikodi

Languages
  - Official: Kannada
- Time zone: UTC+5:30 (IST)

Padlihal is a village in Belgaum district of Karnataka, India.
