= Nippani (Rural) =

- Village
- Country: India
- State: Karnataka
- District: Belgaum
- Talukas: Nippani

Languages
  - Official: Kannada
- Time zone: UTC+5:30 (IST)

Nippani (Rural) is a village in Belgaum district of Karnataka, India.
