= Nanadi =

- Village
- Country: India
- State: Karnataka
- District: Belgaum
- Talukas: Chikodi

Languages
  - Official: Kannada , Marathi
- Time zone: UTC+5:30 (IST)

Nanadi is a village in the Chikodi taluka Belgaum district of Karnataka, India. There are a few old temples such as Halsiddhnath Temple, Maruti Temple, Mahadev Temple, Vittal Rukmini temple, Lakxmi Temple, Thaloba Temple, Jyotiba Temple and Majjid Temple.
