= Lakhanapur =

- Village
- Location in Karnataka, India Lakhanapur (India)
- Coordinates: 16°26′3″N 74°24′6″E
- Country: India
- State: Karnataka
- District: Belgaum
- Talukas: Chikodi

Languages
  - Official: Kannada
- Time zone: UTC+5:30 (IST)

Lakhanapur is a village in Belgaum district in Karnataka, India.
