= Kungatolli =

- Village
- Country: India
- State: Karnataka
- District: Belgaum
- Founder: shivaraj
- Talukas: Chikodi

Languages
  - Official: Kannada
- Time zone: UTC+5:30 (IST)

Kungatolli is a village in Belagavi district in Karnataka, India.
