= Shashikala Annasaheb Jolle =

Indian politician (born 1969)

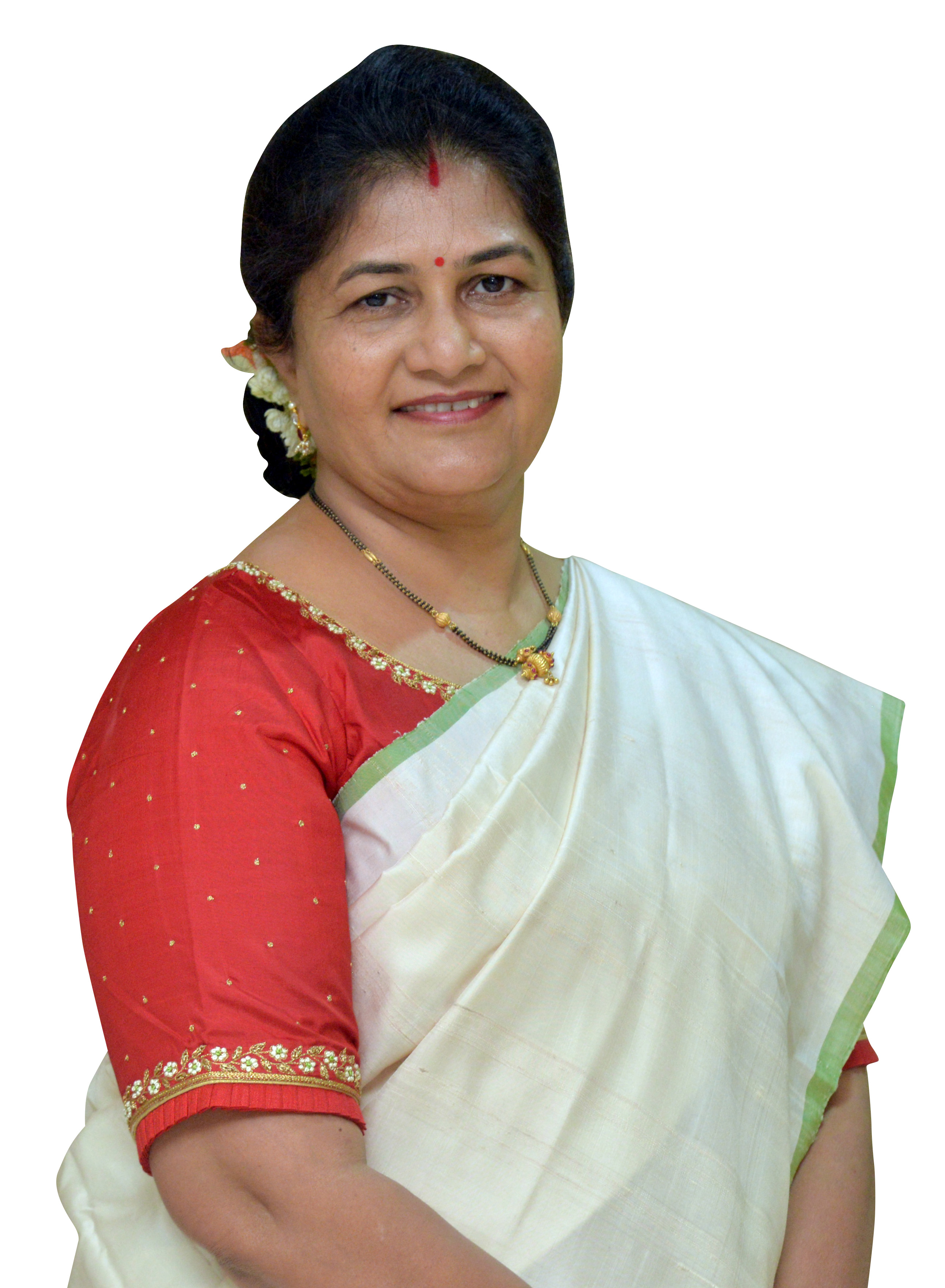

Minister of Muzrai Government of Karnataka
- In office 4 August 2021 – 13 May 2023
- Chief Minister: Basavaraj Bommai
- Preceded by: Kota Srinivas Poojary

Minister of Haj & Wakf Government of Karnataka
- In office 4 August 2021 – 13 May 2023
- Chief Minister: Basavaraj Bommai
- Preceded by: Anand Singh

Minister of Food & Civil Supplies Government of Karnataka
- In office 27 September 2019 – 10 February 2020
- Chief Minister: B. S. Yediyurappa
- Preceded by: B. Z. Zameer Ahmed Khan
- Succeeded by: K. Gopalaiah

Minister of Women & Child Development Government of Karnataka
- In office 20 August 2019 – 28 July 2021
- Chief Minister: B. S. Yediyurappa
- Preceded by: Jayamala
- Succeeded by: Halappa Achar

Member of Karnataka Legislative Assembly
- Incumbent
- Assumed office 2013
- Preceded by: Kakasaheb Pandurang Patil
- Constituency: Nippani

Personal details
- Born: 20 November 1969 (age 56) Bhivashi
- Party: Bharatiya Janata Party
- Spouse: Annasaheb Jolle
- Children: 2
- Education: Pre University Course
- Occupation: Social Worker

Shashikala Annasaheb Jolle (born 20 November 1969), is an Indian social worker and politician. She served as a minister in the BJP government led by B.S. Yediyurappa. She is a three time Member of the Legislative Assembly for the Nippani Assembly constituency representing Bharatiya Janata Party. Shashikala Jolle belongs to the Banajiga community, a sub-sect of the Lingayats.

== Career ==
Shashikala was elected to 14th Karnataka Legislative Assembly in 2013 election from Nippani constituency with 81,860 votes.

She was re-elected from Nippani in the 2018 Karnataka Legislative Assembly elections polling 87,006 votes. On 20 August 2019 she was inducted as the Cabinet Minister in the BJP Government led by B.S. Yediyurappa. Shashikala defeated Kakasaheb Patil of Congress Party and Ishwar Kamath of BSP.

Shashikala Jolle and her husband Annasaheb Jolle, both contested on BJP tickets from Nippani and Chikkodi-Sadalga constituencies respectively. However, Annasaheb Jolle lost to Ganesh Hukkeri for the second time whereas Shashikala Jolle emerged victoriously. Annasaheb Jolle later won Chikkodi Lok Sabha seat in 2019 Indian general elections.
