= Bolewadi =

- Village
- Country: India
- State: Karnataka
- District: Belgaum
- Talukas: Nippani
- Elevation: 655 m (2,149 ft)

Population (2011)
  - Total: 992

Languages
  - Official: Kannada
- Time zone: UTC+5:30 (IST)
- Postal code: 591211

Bolewadi is a village in Belgaum district in the southern state of Karnataka, India. Bolewadi village has higher literacy rate compared to Karnataka. In 2011, literacy rate of Bolewadi village was 79.28% compared to 75.36% of Karnataka. In Bolewadi Male literacy stands at 91.26% while female literacy rate was 67.34%.
