= Nikhil Umesh Katti =

Indian politician

Member of the Karnataka Legislative Assembly
- Incumbent
- Assumed office 13 May 2023
- Preceded by: Umesh Katti
- Constituency: Hukkeri

Personal details
- Party: Bharatiya Janata Party
- Parent: Umesh Katti (father)

Nikhil Umesh Katti (born 1983) is an Indian politician from Karnataka. He is a Member of the Karnataka Legislative Assembly from the Hukkeri Assembly constituency since 13 May 2023. He represents Bharatiya Janata Party.

== Early life and education ==
Katti's late father Umesh Katti, was a former eight time MLA. He completed his MBA in 2009 at University of Wales Institute, Cardiff United Kingdom.

== Career ==
Katti won from Hukkeri Assembly constituency representing Bharatiya Janata Party in the 2023 Karnataka Legislative Assembly election. He polled 103,574 votes and defeated his nearest rival, A. B. Patil of Indian National Congress, by a huge margin of 61,023 votes.
