= Arun Shahapur =

Indian politician

Member of Karnataka Legislative Council
- In office 5 July 2010 – 2022
- Succeeded by: Prakash Hukkeri
- Constituency: North-West Teachers

Personal details
- Born: Arun Shahapur Bijapur district, Karnataka
- Party: Bharatiya Janata Party
- Spouse: Deepa

Arun Shahapur is a Member of the Legislative Council for the State of Karnataka, India. A member of the Bharatiya Janata Party, he has represented the Karnataka North-West Teachers constituency (which covers the districts of Belagavi, Bagalkot, and Vijayapur) since 2010, and was elected in June 2016 to a second six-year term. He has also been working president of Karnataka's Rajya Madhyamika Shikshaka Sangha, its State Secondary Teachers Association
