= Khadaklat =

- Village
- Location in Karnataka, India Khadaklat (India)
- Coordinates: 16°26′49″N 74°28′08″E
- Country: India
- State: Karnataka
- District: Belgaum
- Talukas: Chikodi

Population (2011)
  - Total: 13,921

Languages
  - Official: Kannada
- Time zone: UTC+5:30 (IST)

Khadaklat is a village in the southern state of Karnataka, India. It is located in the Chikodi taluk of Belgaum district in Karnataka.It is located at a distance of 88 km from the district headquarters, 18 km(11 miles) from tehsil Chikkodi, 14 km (8 miles) from nearest city Nippani and 40 km (24 miles) from Kolhapur city in Maharashtra State. It was part of the then Kapashi Sansthan, most part of which is now part of the Maharashtra state, while Khadaklat was included in Karnataka. Kannada is the administrative language. The village is well known for its communal harmony. Yearly 'Urus' celebration is a great symbol of Hindu-Muslim brotherhood with both the communities celebrating it with equal zeal and enthusiasm. Main temples in Khadaklat include Mahadev Mandir, Vashikan mandir, Biradev mandir, Virupakshling, Mahalaxmi & Vitthal-Rakhumai mandir. Dargah is in itself a master piece of Adilshahi architecture. Khadaklat is a hometown of veteran Marathi/Hindi actress SULOCHANA ji, she spent her childhood in gallis of Khadaklat.

== Business ==
Agriculture is the main business in the village. Khadaklat is known for top quality tobacco production, which is used in manufacturing beedi. Other common crops include beetle nut, ground nut, jowar-bajri and sugarcane. Farms are mainly dependent on rain water although ground water and canal water is also used to some extent.

== Education ==
Khadaklat has schools up to 10th standard in Marathi, Kannada and Urdu mediums. It also has Marathi Girls' school up to 7th standard. Recently a Junior College has come up much to the benefit of not only local students but also those from villages in vicinity of Khadaklat. Only entertainment to villagers is the Santaji Chitramandir (theater), although almost every home now bears a TV set and cable network like in any other part of India.

== See also ==
- Belgaum
- Districts of Karnataka

khadaklat is mainly known for the production of the tobacco and beetle nuts.
