= Karagaon =

- Village
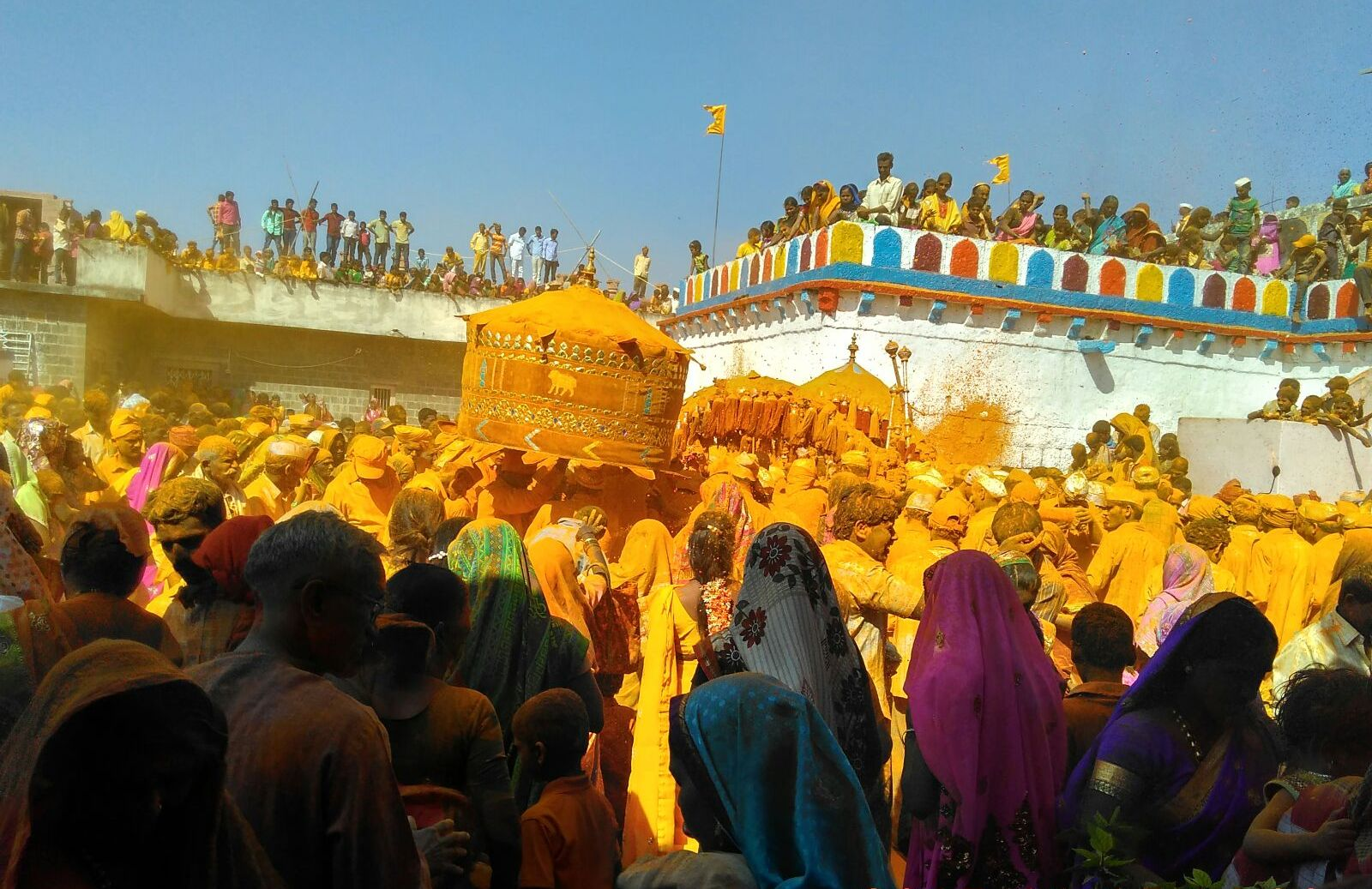
- A panorama of Karisiddeshwar fair (2015) during Deepavali
- Country: India
- State: Karnataka
- District: Belgaum
- Taluk: Chikodi

Government
  - Body: Gram Panchayat
- Elevation: 655 m (2,149 ft)

Population (2011)
  - Total: 3,002

Languages
  - Official: Kannada
- Time zone: UTC+5:30 (IST)
- Pin code: 591226
- Telephone code: 08338
- Vehicle registration: KA-23

Karagaon is a village in Belgaum district in the south western state of Karnataka, village located 16 kilometers from Chikodi (taluk headquarters) and 64 kilometers from its district headquarters Belgaum. Agriculture is the major occupation of the village, grows variety of corps like sugar cane, jawar, soybean, tobacco, and peanuts.

== Governing Body ==
Gram Panchayat is the local governing body which administrates even Donawad and Hanchinal villages as well. Village Panchayat has total 9 wards, 6 wards of Karagaon, 2 of Donawad and only a ward for Hanchinal.

== Culture ==
Karisiddeshwar temple is the largest temple, also a village god and has a huge number of devotees outside the village, apparently a crowded fair dedicated to Karisiddeshwar takes place in the time of Deepavali. Hanuman, Vithoba, Kalmeshwar, Durga, Jakkavva are also worshiped by people in the village notably. Shri Shankarananda math, a holy site has a committee that organizes different spiritual events throughout the year.

Chennaveeratti lake is 2 kilometers from the village and adjacent to the Belavi hill. It is used as a picnic spot.

== Produce ==
Karagaon is known for its hand made Kambali, a type of blanket made by sheep wool. 'Karagaon Udda' (Black gram) a type of unique grain brand is also popular, and the village was widely growing it earlier.

== Transportation ==
Karagaon is directly connected with Chikodi, Sankeshwar and Raibag. NWKRTC runs frequent buses daily, a nearest Railway Station is Ghataprabha and also Chikodi road, where trains are available for Bangalore, Mumbai, Tirupati & many key destinations. Nearest state highway

- Chikkodi – Hattaragi via Hukkeri, 6 km away.
- Nippani – Mudhol – Mahaningapur, 6 km away.
