= Adi (Chikodi) =

- Village
- Adi (Chikodi) is in Belgaum district
- Country: India
- State: Karnataka
- District: Belgaum
- Talukas: Chikodi

Government
  - Body: Village Panchayat
  - Rank: 3200

Languages
  - Official: Kannada Marathi
- Time zone: UTC+5:30 (IST)
- Nearest city: Belgaum
- Civic agency: Village Panchayat

Adi (Chikodi) is a village in the southern state of Karnataka, India. It is located in the Chikodi taluk of Belgaum district in Karnataka. Its population is nearly 5000. It is located near Bangalore-Pune highway. Famous for Shri Mallikarjun (Gram Daivat)and Shri Dattatraya (Parmatmraj Maharaja) temple

== See also ==
- Belgaum
- Districts of Karnataka
