= Shashikanth Akkappa Naik =

Indian politician

Member of Karnataka Legislative Council
- In office 4 November 2008 – 5 January 2010
- Preceded by: Satish Jarkiholi
- Succeeded by: Mahantesh Kavatagimath
- Constituency: Belgaum Local Authorities

Minister of Horticulture Government of Karnataka
- In office 21 June 2006 – 8 October 2007
- Chief Minister: H. D. Kumaraswamy
- Preceded by: B. Nagaraja Shetty
- Succeeded by: S. K. Belubbi

Member of Karnataka Legislative Assembly
- In office 2004–2008
- Preceded by: Umesh Katti
- Succeeded by: Umesh Katti
- Constituency: Hukkeri

Personal details
- Born: 1 April 1960 (age 66) Ghataprabha, Belgaum district, Karnataka
- Party: Bharatiya Janata Party
- Other political affiliations: Karnataka Rajya Raitha Sangha
- Spouse: Bharathi Naik
- Parent: Akappa (father)

Shashikant Akkappa Naik is an Indian politician from the Bharatiya Janata Party, Karnataka who served as the Minister of Horticulture from 21 June 2006 to 8 October 2007 under H. D. Kumaraswamy.

== Political career ==
Shashikanth Naik entered electoral politics by contesting 1994 Karnataka Assembly election from Hukkeri on a KRRS ticket. He lost to Umesh Katti of Janata Dal by a margin of 23,063 votes. He however defeated Umesh Katti in 2004 Karnataka Assembly election on a BJP ticket by a margin of 821 votes. He was inducted into H. D. Kumaraswamy ministry on 21 June 2006 and was allotted Horticulture Department. He however lost in 2008 to Umesh Katti of JDS, who then defected to BJP under Operation Kamala carried out by Yediyurappa. Shashikant Naik was later fielded as the BJP candidate for by-poll to Legislative Council from Belgaum local authority constituency which had fallen vacant after the sitting legislator Satish Jarkiholi was elected to Karnataka Legislative Assembly from Yemkanmardi.
