= Chikkodi-Sadalga Assembly constituency =

Legislative Assembly constituency in Karnataka, India

Coordinates: 16.50°N 74.56°E

Chikkodi-Sadalga
- Constituency No. 2 for the Karnataka Legislative Assembly

Constituency details
- Country: India
- Region: South India
- State: Karnataka
- District: Belagavi
- Lok Sabha constituency: Chikkodi
- Established: 2008
- Reservation: None

Member of Legislative Assembly
- 16th Karnataka Legislative Assembly
- Incumbent Ganesh Prakash Hukkeri
- Party: Indian National Congress
- Elected year: 2023
- Preceded by: Prakash Hukkeri

Chikkodi-Sadalga Assembly constituency is one of the 224 constituencies in the Karnataka Legislative Assembly of Karnataka, a southern state of India. Chikkodi-Sadalga seat is a segment of Chikkodi Lok Sabha constituency. Two Assembly seats, Chikkodi and Sadalga, were merged to form Chikkodi-Sadalga Assembly constituency.

== Members of the Legislative Assembly ==
Year	Member	Party
2008	Prakash Hukkeri	Indian National Congress
2013	Prakash Hukkeri	Indian National Congress
2014^	Ganesh Hukkeri	Indian National Congress
2018	Ganesh Hukkeri	Indian National Congress
2023	Ganesh Hukkeri	Indian National Congress

== Election results ==
=== Assembly Election 2023 ===
2023 Karnataka Legislative Assembly election : Chikkodi-Sadalga
Party	Candidate	Votes	%	±%
INC	Ganesh Hukkeri	128,349	69.82%	▲18.78
BJP	Ramesh Katti	49,840	27.11%	▼18.03
BSP	Arjun Bandu Mane	1,284	0.70%	▼0.94
NOTA	None of the above	957	0.52%	▼0.24
Margin of victory		78,509	42.71%	▲36.81
Turnout		184,169	81.96%	▼2.94
Total valid votes		183,835		
Registered electors		224,693		▲6.45
INC hold		Swing	▲18.78	

=== Assembly Election 2018 ===
2018 Karnataka Legislative Assembly election : Chikkodi-Sadalga
Party	Candidate	Votes	%	±%
INC	Ganesh Hukkeri	91,467	51.04%	▼8.13
BJP	Annasaheb Shankar Jolle	80,898	45.14%	▲5.86
BSP	Sadashivappa Maruti Walke	2,935	1.64%	New
NOTA	None of the above	1,363	0.76%	▲0.16
Margin of victory		10,569	5.90%	▼14.00
Turnout		179,206	84.90%	▲1.69
Total valid votes		179,201		
Registered electors		211,083		▲9.18
INC hold		Swing	▼8.13	

=== Assembly By-election 2014 ===
2014 Karnataka Legislative Assembly by-election : Chikkodi-Sadalga
Party	Candidate	Votes	%	±%
INC	Ganesh Hukkeri	94,636	59.17%	▼9.27
BJP	K. M. Mallikarjun	62,816	39.28%	▲22.11
SJP	A. S. Kurane	1,009	0.63%	New
NOTA	None of the above	953	0.60%	New
Margin of victory		31,820	19.90%	▼31.37
Turnout		160,883	83.21%	▲3.18
Total valid votes		159,929		
Registered electors		193,337		▲3.21
INC hold		Swing	▼9.27	

=== Assembly Election 2013 ===
2013 Karnataka Legislative Assembly election : Chikkodi-Sadalga
Party	Candidate	Votes	%	±%
INC	Prakash Hukkeri	102,237	68.44%	▲13.61
BJP	Basavanni Rudrappa Sangappagol	25,649	17.17%	▼18.41
BSP	Kiwad Nagesh Tukaram	15,409	10.32%	▲6.35
JD(S)	Dr. Annappa Maruti Magadum	1,842	1.23%	▼0.90
Independent	Raju Sambha Kamate	1,139	0.76%	New
Margin of victory		76,588	51.27%	▲32.02
Turnout		149,914	80.03%	▲5.76
Total valid votes		149,375		
Registered electors		187,317		▲11.18
INC hold		Swing	▲13.61	

=== Assembly Election 2008 ===
2008 Karnataka Legislative Assembly election : Chikkodi-Sadalga
Party	Candidate	Votes	%	±%
INC	Prakash Hukkeri	68,575	54.83%	New
BJP	Jigajinagi Ramesh Chandappa	44,505	35.58%	New
BSP	Veerasing Abasab Ghorpade	4,970	3.97%	New
JD(S)	Kore Kiran Ganapatarao	2,663	2.13%	New
Independent	Ravasab Mallappa Gunake	1,459	1.17%	New
Rashtriya Hindustan Sena Karnataka	Ravi B. Hampannawar	1,318	1.05%	New
Margin of victory		24,070	19.25%	
Turnout		125,129	74.27%	
Total valid votes		125,069		
Registered electors		168,481		
INC win (new seat)				

== See also ==
- Belagavi district
- Chikkodi Lok Sabha constituency
- List of constituencies of Karnataka Legislative Assembly
