= Umesh Katti =

Indian political activist (1961–2022)

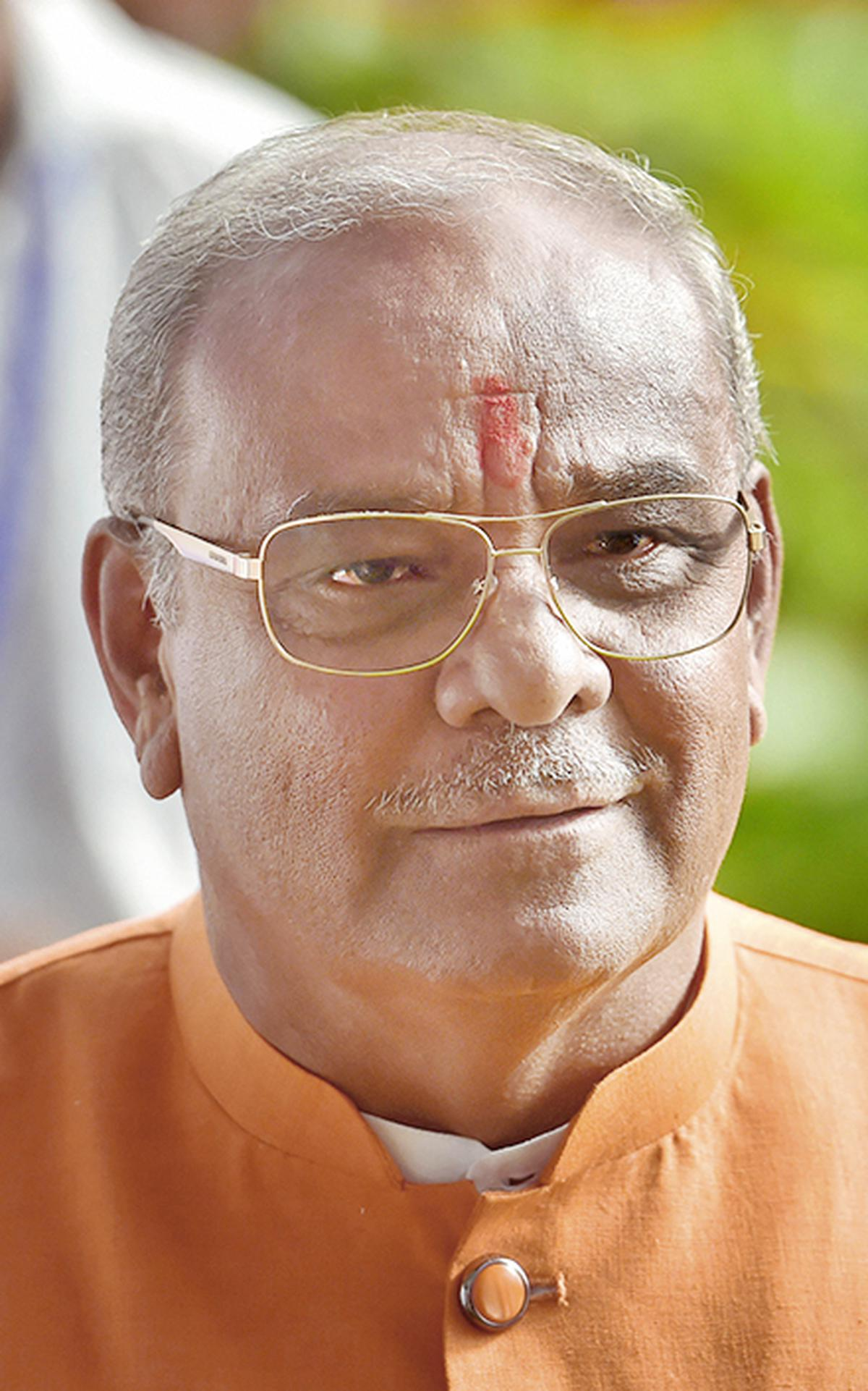

Minister of Forest Government of Karnataka
- In office 4 August 2021 – 6 September 2022
- Chief Minister: Basavaraj Bommai
- Preceded by: Arvind Limbavali
- Succeeded by: Eshwara Khandre

Minister of Food, Civil Supplies & Consumer Affairs Government of Karnataka
- In office 21 January 2021 – 6 September 2022
- Chief Minister: B. S. Yediyurappa; Basavaraj Bommai
- Preceded by: K. Gopalaiah
- Succeeded by: K. H. Muniyappa

Minister of Agriculture Government of Karnataka
- In office 23 September 2010 – 13 May 2013
- Chief Minister: B. S. Yediyurappa; Sadananda Gowda; Jagadish Shettar
- Preceded by: S. A. Ravindranath
- Succeeded by: Krishna Byre Gowda

Member of Karnataka Legislative Assembly
- In office 2008 – 5 September 2022
- Preceded by: Shashikanth Akkappa Naik
- Constituency: Hukkeri
- In office 1985–2004
- Preceded by: Vishwanath Mallappa Katti
- Succeeded by: Shashikanth Akkappa Naik
- Constituency: Hukkeri

Personal details
- Born: 14 March 1961 Khadaklat, Mysore State, India
- Died: 6 September 2022 (aged 61) Bengaluru, Karnataka, India
- Party: Bharatiya Janata Party
- Other political affiliations: Janata Party, Janata Dal, Janata Dal (United), Janata Dal (Secular).
- Relations: Ramesh Katti
- Education: KLE Society's Raja Lakhamagouda Science Institute (Autonomous)

Umesh Vishwanath Katti (14 March 1961 – 6 September 2022) was an Indian politician. He was first elected to Karnataka Assembly as member of Janata Dal. At the time of his death, he was a member of Bharatiya Janata Party and a Minister of Food, Civil Supplies & Consumer Affairs and Forest of Karnataka from 4 August 2021 to 6 September 2022. of the Karnataka Legislative Assembly. He entered politics after the demise of his father Vishwanath Katti in 1985 who was Member of the Legislative Assembly. Katti family belongs to the Banajiga community, a sub-sect of Lingayat.

He contested the 2013 Karnataka Legislative Assembly elections from Hukkeri Assembly constituency and won polling by 81,810 votes. He was an eight-term legislator from north Karnataka's Belagavi district.

He condemned Chief Minister B.S. Yediyurappa's statement about releasing Krishna waters from Tubchi-Babalad lift irrigation scheme to Maharashtra, and yet again, raised the demand for separate Statehood for north Karnataka if the region is neglected.

During Coronavirus, he had made a statement as a sitting minister and said, "We ministers should survive (Coronavirus) not sure about you (people)".

In 2021, while responding to a farmer on cuts in the rice allotment of the public distribution system, he had said "It is better to die. Actually, that is the reason we have stopped giving. Please don't call me."

On 6 September 2022, he suffered a massive heart attack and collapsed in the bathroom of his Dollar's Colony residence in Bangaluru. Katti was taken to M S Ramaiah Hospital in Bangalore, where he was later pronounced dead. His last rituals took place in his Home Town Bellad Bagewadi.
