= Hattarawat =

Indian village in the state of Karnataka

Hattarwat is a village located in Chikodi taluka in the Belgaum District of the State of Karnataka in southern India. It is also called the green valley of Chikodi.

== Geography and climate ==
It is 1,000 metres (3,300 feet) above sea level. The village is very cool. It never faces a water problem in summer. The climate is cool even when nearby villages face a temperature of 32 °C.

== History ==
The founder of the village was Nasarullah Shah Wali-Allah Taalanahu. This village is famous for Hindu-Muslim Unity.
