= 1985 elections in India =

Elections in India
- 1985

Elections in the Republic of India in 1985 included elections to fourteen state legislative assemblies.

== Overall result ==
Date(s)	State	Government before	Chief Minister before	Government after	Elected Chief Minister	Maps
3 February 1985	Madhya Pradesh	Indian National Congress	Arjun Singh	Indian National Congress	Arjun Singh	
3 February 1985	Uttar Pradesh	Indian National Congress	Narayan Dutt Tiwari	Indian National Congress	Narayan Dutt Tiwari	
5 March 1985	Andhra Pradesh	Telugu Desam Party	N. T. Rama Rao	Telugu Desam Party	N. T. Rama Rao	
5 March 1985	Gujarat	Indian National Congress	Madhav Singh Solanki	Indian National Congress	Madhav Singh Solanki	
2 and 5 March 1985	Bihar	Indian National Congress	Chandrashekhar Singh	Indian National Congress	Bindeshwari Dubey	
2 and 5 March 1985	Maharashtra	Indian National Congress	Vasantdada Patil	Indian National Congress	Vasantdada Patil	
	Himachal Pradesh	Indian National Congress	Virbhadra Singh	Indian National Congress	Virbhadra Singh	
	Karnataka	Janata Party	Ramakrishna Hegde	Janata Party	Ramakrishna Hegde	
3 May 1985	Pondicherry	President's Rule		Indian National Congress	M. O. H. Farook	
3 May 1985	Rajasthan	Indian National Congress	Hari Dev Joshi	Indian National Congress	Hari Dev Joshi	
3 May 1985	Sikkim	President's Rule		Sikkim Sangram Parishad	Nar Bahadur Bhandari	
26 September 1985	Punjab	President's Rule		Shiromani Akali Dal	Surjith Singh Barnala	
	Odisha	Indian National Congress	Janaki Ballabh Patnaik	Indian National Congress	Janaki Ballabh Patnaik	
	Assam	Indian National Congress	Hiteswar Saikia	Independent	Prafulla Kumar Mahanta	

== Legislative Assembly elections ==
=== Andhra Pradesh ===
No	Party	Seats Contested	Seats Won	Seats change	Vote Share	Swing
1	Telugu Desam Party	250	202	+1	46.21%	-7.50%
2	Indian National Congress	290	50	-10	37.25%	+3.67%
3	Communist Party of India (Marxist)	12	11	+6	2.31%	+0.20%
4	Communist Party of India	12	11	+7	2.69%	-0.10%
5	Bharatiya Janata Party	10	8	+3	1.32%	-1.14%
6	Janata Party	5	3	+2	0.76%	-0.20%

=== Assam ===
Pos	Party	Contested	Seats	Swing
1	Independent	104	92	▲82
2	Indian National Congress	125	25	▼66
3	Indian Congress (Socialist)	72	4	▲2
4	Plain Tribals Council of Assam	28	3	-
5	Communist Party of India (Marxist)	39	2	-
	Total		126	

=== Bihar ===
Party	Party Flag	Seats Contested	Seats Won	Popular Vote	Percentage
Indian National Congress		323	196	9,558,562	39.30%
Lok Dal		261	46	3,573,173	14.69%
Bharatiya Janata Party		234	16	1,833,275	7.54%
Janata Party		229	13	1,754,705	7.21%
Communist Party of India		167	12	2,154,066	8.86%
Jharkhand Mukti Morcha		57	9	443,822	1.82%
Communist Party of India (Marxist)		44	1	392,375	1.61%
Indian Congress (Socialist)		59	1	160,159	0.66%
Socialist Unity Centre of India		1	1	17,890	0.07%
Independents		2804	29	4,349,057	17.88%
Total		4237	324	24,323,868	

=== Gujarat ===
Parties and coalitions	Popular vote		Seats	
Parties and coalitions	Votes	%	Won	+/−
Indian National Congress (INC)	5,122,753	55.55	149	+8
Janata Party	1,775,338	19.25	14	-7
Bharatiya Janata Party (BJP)	1,379,120	14.96	11	+2
Independents (IND)	856,160	9.28	8	
CPM	16,543	0.18	0	0
CPI	24,013	0.26	0	0
Total	9,221,149	100.00	182	±0
Valid votes	7,770,198	98.03		
Invalid votes	155,782	1.97		
Votes cast / turnout	13,676,131	51.59		
Registered voters	15,363,762			

=== Himachal Pradesh ===
Rank	Party	Seats Contested	Seats won	% votes
1	Indian National Congress	68	58	55.86
2	Bharatiya Janata Party	57	7	35.87
3	Independent	68	2	8.28
4	Lok Dal	3	1	1.44
	Total		68	

=== Karnataka ===
Summary of results of the Karnataka Legislative Assembly election, 1985
Political Party	Seats Contested	Seats Won	Number of Votes	% of Votes	Seat change
Janata Party	205	139	6,418,795	43.60%	▲44
Indian National Congress	223	65	6,009,461	40.82%	▼17
Communist Party of India	7	3	133,008	0.90%	Steady
Bharatiya Janata Party	116	2	571,280	3.88%	▼16
Communist Party of India (Marxist)	7	2	127,333	0.86%	▼1
Independents	1200	13	1,393,626	9.47%	▼9
Total	1795	224	14,720,634		

=== Madhya Pradesh ===
SN	Party	Seats Contested	Seats won	Seats Changed	% Votes
1	Indian National Congress	320	250	+4	48.87
1	Bharatiya Janata Party	311	58	-2	32.42%
3	Janata Party	172	5	+3	4.01%
4	Indian National Congress (S)	30	1	N/A	0.40%
7	Independent	320	6	-2	10.82%
	Total		320		

=== Maharashtra ===
Summary of results of the Maharashtra State Assembly election, 1985
Political Party	No. of candidates	No. of elected	Number of Votes	% of Votes	Seat change
Indian National Congress	287	161	9,522,556	43.41%	▼25
Indian National Congress (Socialist)	126	54	3,790,850	17.28%	▲54
Janata Party	61	20	1,618,101	7.38%	▲20
Bharatiya Janata Party	67	16	1,590,351	7.25%	▲2
Peasants and Workers Party of India	29	13	825,949	3.77%	▲4
Communist Party of India	31	2	202,790	0.92%	Steady
Communist Party of India (Marxist)	14	2	174,350	0.79%	Steady
Independents	1506	20	3,836,390	17.49%	▲10
Total	2230	288	21,934,742		

=== Odisha ===
Summary of results of the 1985 Odisha Legislative Assembly election
Political Party	Flag	Seats Contested	Won	Net Change in seats	% of Seats	Votes	Vote %	Change in vote %
Indian National Congress		147	117	▼1	79.59	40,07,258	51.08	▲3.3
Communist Party of India (Marxist)		27	1	-	0.68	89,225	15.97	-
Bharatiya Janata Party		67	1	▲1	0.68	2,04,346	5.66	▼1.43
Communist Party of India		27	1	▼3	0.68	2,59,508	16.12	▲13.4
Janata Party		140	21	-	14.28	24,01,566	32.03	
Independent		374	7	N/A	4.76	8,23,850	11.54	N/A
		Total Seats	147 ( )	Voters	1,53,37,200	Turnout	80,16,583 (52.27%)	

=== Punjab ===
Result of Punjab Legislative Assembly election 1985
Party	contested	Seats won	change in seats	popular vote	%
Shiromani Akali Dal	100	73	▲23	26,30,270	38.01
Indian National Congress	117	32	▼31	26,20,042	37.86
Bharatiya Janata Party	26	6	▲5	3,45,560	4.99
Communist Party of India	38	1	▼8	3,07,496	4.44
Janata Party	5	1	▲1	75,307	1.09
Independents	542	4	▲2	8,09,254	11.69
Others	29	0	-	1,32,889	1.92
Total	857	117		69,20,818	

=== Puducherry ===
Party	Votes	%	Seats	+/–
Indian National Congress	98,601	32.68	15	▲5
Dravida Munnetra Kazhagam	87,754	29.08	5	▼9
All India Anna Dravida Munnetra Kazhagam	47,521	15.75	6	▲6
Janata Party	25,966	8.61	2	▼1
Others	22,609	7.49	0	0
Independents	19,273	6.39	2	0
Total	301,724	100.00	30	0
Valid votes	301,724	99.08		
Invalid/blank votes	2,808	0.92		
Total votes	304,532	100.00		
Registered voters/turnout	388,472	78.39		
Source: ECI

=== Rajasthan ===
Party	Votes	%	Seats	+/–
Indian National Congress	5,342,920	46.57	113	–20
Bharatiya Janata Party	2,437,594	21.24	39	+7
Lok Dal	1,360,826	11.86	27	New
Janata Party	675,103	5.88	10	+2
Communist Party of India	141,063	1.23	1	0
Indian National Congress (Jagjivan)	74,176	0.65	0	New
Communist Party of India (Marxist)	66,921	0.58	0	–1
Indian Congress (Socialist)	9,731	0.08	0	New
Independents	1,365,641	11.90	10	–2
Total	11,473,975	100.00	200	0
Valid votes	11,473,975	98.40		
Invalid/blank votes	186,527	1.60		
Total votes	11,660,502	100.00		
Registered voters/turnout	21,228,702	54.93		
Source: ECI

=== Sikkim ===
Party	Votes	%	Seats	+/–
Sikkim Sangram Parishad	60,371	62.20	30	+14
Indian National Congress	23,440	24.15	1	+1
Janata Party	913	0.94	0	0
Sikkim Prajatantra Congress	438	0.45	0	–4
Communist Party of India (Marxist)	336	0.35	0	0
Communist Party of India	25	0.03	0	New
Independents	11,534	11.88	1	0
Total	97,057	100.00	32	0
Valid votes	97,057	97.61		
Invalid/blank votes	2,378	2.39		
Total votes	99,435	100.00		
Registered voters/turnout	155,041	64.13		
Source: ECI

=== Uttar Pradesh ===
Party	Votes	%	Seats	+/–
Indian National Congress	11,544,698	39.25	269	–40
Lok Dal	6,304,455	21.43	84	New
Bharatiya Janata Party	2,890,884	9.83	16	+5
Janata Party	1,646,005	5.60	20	+16
Communist Party of India	894,620	3.04	6	0
Indian National Congress (Jagjivan)	669,031	2.27	5	New
Doordarshi Party	228,688	0.78	0	New
Communist Party of India (Marxist)	198,780	0.68	2	0
Indian Congress (Socialist)	88,616	0.30	0	New
All India Forward Bloc	4,074	0.01	0	New
Revolutionary Socialist Party	1,297	0.00	0	New
Republican Party of India	562	0.00	0	0
Independents	4,942,962	16.80	23	+6
Total	29,414,672	100.00	425	0
Valid votes	29,414,672	98.53		
Invalid/blank votes	437,456	1.47		
Total votes	29,852,128	100.00		
Registered voters/turnout	65,404,531	45.64		
Source: ECI
