= Mahantesh Kavatagimath =

Indian politician

Member of Karnataka Legislative Council
- In office 6 January 2010 – 5 January 2022
- Preceded by: Shashikanth Akkappa Naik
- Succeeded by: Lakhan Jarkiholi
- Constituency: Belgaum Local Authorities

Personal details
- Born: Mahantesh Kavatagimath; 16 January 1966 (age 60) Saundatti, Belgaum district, Karnataka, India
- Party: Bharatiya Janata Party
- Spouse: Rajeshwari

Mahantesh Mallikarjun Kavatagimath is an Indian politician who served as the Chief whip of the Bharatiya Janata Party in Karnataka Legislative Council from 2 July 2018 up to 5 January 2022. He was elected from Belgaum Local Authorities in 2010 & 2016, twice in a row. He lost the election in 2022 after Lakhan Jarkiholi contested as an Independent and won.

He is actively involved in educational pursuits. He is on the board of the Karnataka Lingayat Education Society.
