= Nippani Assembly constituency =

Legislative Assembly constituency in Karnataka, India

Coordinates: 16.40°N 74.38°E

Nippani
- Constituency No. 1 for the Karnataka Legislative Assembly

Constituency details
- Country: India
- Region: South India
- State: Karnataka
- District: Belagavi
- Lok Sabha constituency: Chikkodi
- Established: 1956
- Reservation: None

Member of Legislative Assembly
- 16th Karnataka Legislative Assembly
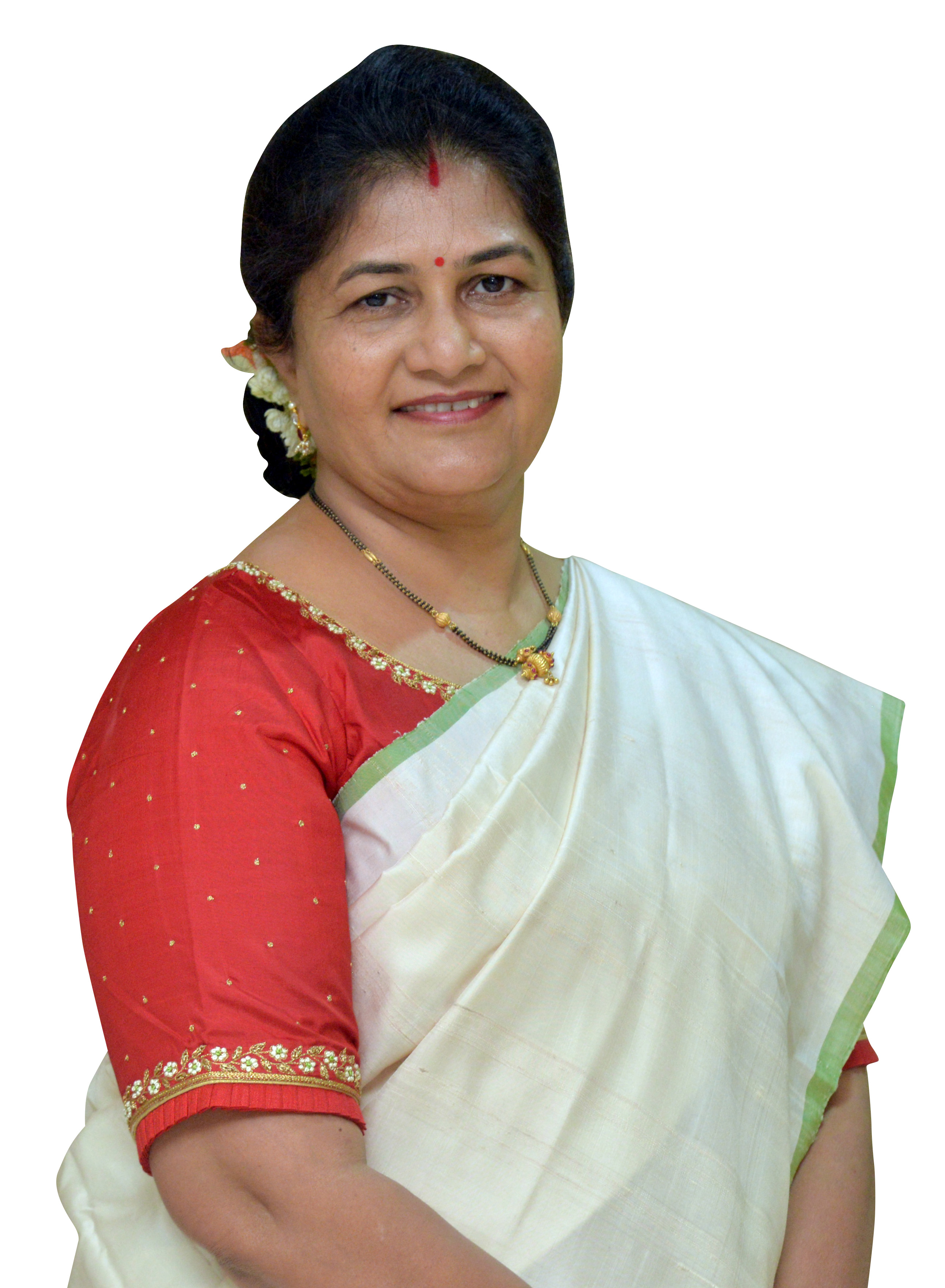
- Incumbent Shashikala Annasaheb Jolle
- Party: Bharatiya Janata Party
- Elected year: 2023
- Preceded by: Kakasaheb Pandurang Patil

Nippani Assembly constituency is one of the 224 constituencies in the Karnataka Legislative Assembly of Karnataka, a southern state of India. It is a segment of Chikkodi Lok Sabha constituency.

== Members of the Legislative Assembly ==
| Election | Member | Party |
|---|---|---|
| 1957 | Naik Balvant Dattoba | Independent politician |
| 1962 | Govind Krishna Manavi | Maharashtra Ekikaran Samiti |
| 1967 | Govind Krishna Manavi | Independent politician |
| 1972 | K. R. Vithalrao | Indian National Congress |
| 1978 | Balavant Gopal Chavan | Independent politician |
| 1983 | Balasaheb Dattaji Shinde | Independent politician |
| 1985 | Veerkumar Appaso Patil | Indian National Congress |
| 1989 | Joshi Subhash Sridhar | Janata Dal |
| 1994 | Joshi Subhash Sridhar | Janata Dal |
| 1999 | Kakasaheb Pandurang Patil | Indian National Congress |
| 2004 | Kakasaheb Pandurang Patil | Indian National Congress |
| 2008 | Kakasaheb Pandurang Patil | Indian National Congress |
| 2013 | Shashikala Annasaheb Jolle | Bharatiya Janata Party |
| 2018 | Shashikala Annasaheb Jolle | Bharatiya Janata Party |
| 2023 | Shashikala Annasaheb Jolle | Bharatiya Janata Party |

== Election results ==
=== Assembly Election 2023 ===
2023 Karnataka Legislative Assembly election : Nippani
| Party | Candidate | Votes | % | ±% |
|---|---|---|---|---|
| BJP | Shashikala Annasaheb Jolle | 73,348 | 39.14% | ▼11.37 |
| NCP | Uttam Raosaheb Patil | 66,056 | 35.25% | New |
| INC | Kakasaheb P. Patil | 44,107 | 23.53% | ▼22.04 |
| NOTA | None of the above | 919 | 0.49% | ▼0.35 |
| Margin of victory | | 7,292 | 3.89% | ▼1.05 |
| Turnout | | 188,686 | 83.25% | ▲2.13 |
| Total valid votes | | 187,412 | | |
| Registered electors | | 226,662 | | ▲6.69 |
| BJP hold | | Swing | ▼11.37 | |

=== Assembly Election 2018 ===
2018 Karnataka Legislative Assembly election : Nippani
| Party | Candidate | Votes | % | ±% |
|---|---|---|---|---|
| BJP | Shashikala Annasaheb Jolle | 87,006 | 50.51% | ▼3.10 |
| INC | Kakaso Pandurang Patil | 78,500 | 45.57% | ▲4.18 |
| BSP | Kamat Ramesh Ishwar | 2,476 | 1.44% | ▲0.28 |
| NOTA | None of the above | 1,447 | 0.84% | New |
| AIMEP | Rohini Shrimant Dixit | 1,353 | 0.79% | New |
| Margin of victory | | 8,506 | 4.94% | ▼7.28 |
| Turnout | | 172,352 | 81.12% | ▲0.50 |
| Total valid votes | | 172,251 | | |
| Registered electors | | 212,456 | | ▲12.00 |
| BJP hold | | Swing | ▼3.10 | |

=== Assembly Election 2013 ===
2013 Karnataka Legislative Assembly election : Nippani
| Party | Candidate | Votes | % | ±% |
|---|---|---|---|---|
| BJP | Shashikala Annasaheb Jolle | 81,860 | 53.61% | ▲23.69 |
| INC | Kakaso Pandurang Patil | 63,198 | 41.39% | ▲5.66 |
| BSP | Sujit Dinakar Mhetri | 1,771 | 1.16% | ▼2.08 |
| Independent | Dr. Chandrakant Bashetti Kurabetti | 1,545 | 1.01% | New |
| Independent | Ramachandra Appanna Pujari | 1,232 | 0.81% | New |
| Margin of victory | | 18,662 | 12.22% | ▲6.41 |
| Turnout | | 152,927 | 80.62% | ▲6.63 |
| Total valid votes | | 152,690 | | |
| Registered electors | | 189,698 | | ▲8.84 |
| BJP gain from INC | | Swing | ▲17.88 | |

=== Assembly Election 2008 ===
2008 Karnataka Legislative Assembly election : Nippani
| Party | Candidate | Votes | % | ±% |
|---|---|---|---|---|
| INC | Kakasaheb Pandurang Patil | 46,070 | 35.73% | ▼5.58 |
| BJP | Shashikala Annasaheb Jolle | 38,583 | 29.92% | ▼10.95 |
| JD(S) | Subhash Shridhar Joshi | 35,657 | 27.65% | ▲24.21 |
| BSP | Khot Ravindra Annasaheb | 4,182 | 3.24% | ▲0.70 |
| Independent | Harish Ramachandra Tarale | 2,075 | 1.61% | New |
| SP | Naiku Ishwar Khot | 1,149 | 0.89% | New |
| Margin of victory | | 7,487 | 5.81% | ▲5.37 |
| Turnout | | 128,958 | 73.99% | ▲1.67 |
| Total valid votes | | 128,952 | | |
| Registered electors | | 174,283 | | ▲29.46 |
| INC hold | | Swing | ▼5.58 | |

=== Assembly Election 2004 ===
2004 Karnataka Legislative Assembly election : Nippani
| Party | Candidate | Votes | % | ±% |
|---|---|---|---|---|
| INC | Kakasaheb Pandurang Patil | 40,222 | 41.31% | ▼13.41 |
| BJP | Joshi Subhash Sridhar | 39,793 | 40.87% | New |
| SS | Kurbetti Bharat Bashetti | 9,831 | 10.10% | New |
| JD(S) | Prasanna Kumar Shant Kumar Gujar | 3,345 | 3.44% | ▲2.91 |
| BSP | Poojari Ramachandra Appanna | 2,469 | 2.54% | ▲1.86 |
| Independent | Shirkoli Jahengir Appannasab | 878 | 0.90% | New |
| Independent | Mahesh Maruti Shreyakar | 818 | 0.84% | New |
| Margin of victory | | 429 | 0.44% | ▼11.52 |
| Turnout | | 97,359 | 72.32% | ▲1.30 |
| Total valid votes | | 97,356 | | |
| Registered electors | | 134,620 | | ▲5.57 |
| INC hold | | Swing | ▼13.41 | |

=== Assembly Election 1999 ===
1999 Karnataka Legislative Assembly election : Nippani
| Party | Candidate | Votes | % | ±% |
|---|---|---|---|---|
| INC | Kakasaheb Pandurang Patil | 48,270 | 54.72% | ▲19.88 |
| JD(U) | Joshi Subhash Sridhar | 37,721 | 42.76% | New |
| BSP | Baigin | 604 | 0.68% | New |
| Independent | Subhash Tukaram Sangakar | 583 | 0.66% | New |
| BRP | Babasaheb Balagouda Desai | 572 | 0.65% | New |
| Margin of victory | | 10,549 | 11.96% | ▲10.05 |
| Turnout | | 90,563 | 71.02% | ▼1.76 |
| Total valid votes | | 88,217 | | |
| Rejected ballots | | 2,346 | 2.59% | ▲0.95 |
| Registered electors | | 127,520 | | ▲9.54 |
| INC gain from JD | | Swing | ▲17.97 | |

=== Assembly Election 1994 ===
1994 Karnataka Legislative Assembly election : Nippani
| Party | Candidate | Votes | % | ±% |
|---|---|---|---|---|
| JD | Joshi Subhash Sridhar | 30,612 | 36.75% | ▲0.32 |
| INC | Veerkumar Appasaheb Patil | 29,017 | 34.84% | ▼1.09 |
| Independent | Kakaso Pandurang Patil | 16,722 | 20.08% | New |
| KRRS | Patil Shivaji Krishna | 2,600 | 3.12% | New |
| Independent | Manvi Shamarao Govindrao | 1,121 | 1.35% | New |
| INC | Nippankar Desai Pratapsing Ranojirao | 1,069 | 1.28% | New |
| BJP | Paramane Sadashiv Balappa | 781 | 0.94% | New |
| Independent | Jahangir Appasaheb Shirkoli | 579 | 0.70% | New |
| Margin of victory | | 1,595 | 1.91% | ▲1.41 |
| Turnout | | 84,725 | 72.78% | ▲2.00 |
| Total valid votes | | 83,295 | | |
| Rejected ballots | | 1,387 | 1.64% | ▼6.02 |
| Registered electors | | 116,414 | | ▲6.56 |
| JD hold | | Swing | ▲0.32 | |

=== Assembly Election 1989 ===
1989 Karnataka Legislative Assembly election : Nippani
| Party | Candidate | Votes | % | ±% |
|---|---|---|---|---|
| JD | Joshi Subhash Sridhar | 26,009 | 36.43% | New |
| INC | Amble Channarao Vishnupanth | 25,655 | 35.93% | ▼38.71 |
| Independent | Manvi Shamarao Govindrao | 15,607 | 21.86% | New |
| JP | Manohar Halappa Banne | 1,863 | 2.61% | New |
| Kranti Sabha | Kamate Shivamurthi Bhima | 1,472 | 2.06% | New |
| Margin of victory | | 354 | 0.50% | ▼61.14 |
| Turnout | | 77,328 | 70.78% | ▲1.25 |
| Total valid votes | | 71,404 | | |
| Rejected ballots | | 5,924 | 7.66% | ▲6.27 |
| Registered electors | | 109,246 | | ▲20.90 |
| JD gain from INC | | Swing | ▼38.21 | |

=== Assembly Election 1985 ===
1985 Karnataka Legislative Assembly election : Nippani
| Party | Candidate | Votes | % | ±% |
|---|---|---|---|---|
| INC | Veerkumar Appaso Patil | 46,242 | 74.64% | ▲45.46 |
| Independent | Chavan Balwantrao Gopal | 8,052 | 13.00% | New |
| Independent | Desai Nipankar Pratap Singh Ranojirao | 6,284 | 10.14% | New |
| Independent | Shinde Malatibai Rajaram | 745 | 1.20% | New |
| Independent | Tatoba Laxman Kamate | 631 | 1.02% | New |
| Margin of victory | | 38,190 | 61.64% | ▲55.28 |
| Turnout | | 62,825 | 69.53% | ▼0.33 |
| Total valid votes | | 61,954 | | |
| Rejected ballots | | 871 | 1.39% | ▼0.45 |
| Registered electors | | 90,363 | | ▲9.08 |
| INC gain from Independent | | Swing | ▲36.51 | |

=== Assembly Election 1983 ===
1983 Karnataka Legislative Assembly election : Nippani
| Party | Candidate | Votes | % | ±% |
|---|---|---|---|---|
| Independent | Balasaheb Dattaji Shinde | 21,658 | 38.13% | New |
| Independent | Joshi Subhash Sridhar | 18,043 | 31.76% | New |
| INC | Patil Malagouda Hari | 16,578 | 29.18% | New |
| Margin of victory | | 3,615 | 6.36% | ▼36.39 |
| Turnout | | 57,871 | 69.86% | ▼3.49 |
| Total valid votes | | 56,804 | | |
| Rejected ballots | | 1,067 | 1.84% | ▼0.46 |
| Registered electors | | 82,842 | | ▲7.33 |
| Independent hold | | Swing | ▼26.14 | |

=== Assembly Election 1978 ===
1978 Karnataka Legislative Assembly election : Nippani
| Party | Candidate | Votes | % | ±% |
|---|---|---|---|---|
| Independent | Balavant Gopal Chavan | 35,548 | 64.27% | New |
| Independent | Dhariya Gopinath Mainkchand | 11,904 | 21.52% | New |
| JP | Shinde Malatibai Rajaram | 6,825 | 12.34% | New |
| Independent | Upadhye Chandrakant Balappa | 1,036 | 1.87% | New |
| Margin of victory | | 23,644 | 42.75% | ▲23.14 |
| Turnout | | 56,614 | 73.35% | ▼3.26 |
| Total valid votes | | 55,313 | | |
| Rejected ballots | | 1,301 | 2.30% | ▲2.30 |
| Registered electors | | 77,182 | | ▲18.82 |
| Independent gain from INC | | Swing | ▲5.71 | |

=== Assembly Election 1972 ===
1972 Mysore State Legislative Assembly election : Nippani
| Party | Candidate | Votes | % | ±% |
|---|---|---|---|---|
| INC | K. R. Vithalrao | 28,494 | 58.56% | ▲21.24 |
| Independent | Balavant Gopal Chavan | 18,950 | 38.95% | New |
| INC(O) | P. Parasharam Patil | 1,214 | 2.49% | New |
| Margin of victory | | 9,544 | 19.61% | ▼4.74 |
| Turnout | | 49,761 | 76.61% | ▼7.98 |
| Total valid votes | | 48,658 | | |
| Registered electors | | 64,957 | | ▲12.09 |
| INC gain from Independent | | Swing | ▼3.11 | |

=== Assembly Election 1967 ===
1967 Mysore State Legislative Assembly election : Nippani
| Party | Candidate | Votes | % | ±% |
|---|---|---|---|---|
| Independent | Govind Krishna Manavi | 29,041 | 61.67% | New |
| INC | M. S. Yeshwantapa | 17,575 | 37.32% | ▲11.95 |
| Independent | P. K. Patil | 474 | 1.01% | New |
| Margin of victory | | 11,466 | 24.35% | ▼24.91 |
| Turnout | | 49,019 | 84.59% | ▲11.55 |
| Total valid votes | | 47,090 | | |
| Registered electors | | 57,949 | | ▲11.67 |
| Independent gain from MES | | Swing | ▼12.96 | |

=== Assembly Election 1962 ===
1962 Mysore State Legislative Assembly election : Nippani
| Party | Candidate | Votes | % | ±% |
|---|---|---|---|---|
| MES | Govind Krishna Manavi | 27,280 | 74.63% | New |
| INC | Balarishna Keshav Patwardhan | 9,274 | 25.37% | ▲2.77 |
| Margin of victory | | 18,006 | 49.26% | ▼4.29 |
| Turnout | | 37,904 | 73.04% | ▼1.15 |
| Total valid votes | | 36,554 | | |
| Registered electors | | 51,894 | | ▲12.46 |
| MES gain from Independent | | Swing | ▼1.51 | |

=== Assembly Election 1957 ===
1957 Mysore State Legislative Assembly election : Nippani
| Party | Candidate | Votes | % | ±% |
|---|---|---|---|---|
| Independent | Naik Balvant Dattoba | 26,069 | 76.14% | New |
| INC | Patil Pandurang Parashram | 7,737 | 22.60% | New |
| Independent | Joshi Govind Sadashiv | 430 | 1.26% | New |
| Margin of victory | | 18,332 | 53.55% | |
| Turnout | | 34,236 | 74.19% | |
| Total valid votes | | 34,236 | | |
| Registered electors | | 46,145 | | |
| Independent win (new seat) | | | | |

== See also ==
- Belagavi district
- Chikkodi Lok Sabha constituency
- List of constituencies of Karnataka Legislative Assembly
