= Ramesh Katti =

Indian politician

Ramesh Vishwanath Katti

Member of Parliament, Lok Sabha
- In office 2009–2014
- Preceded by: Ramesh Jigajinagi
- Succeeded by: Prakash Hukkeri
- Constituency: Chikkodi

The Belagavi District Central Cooperative Bank
- Incumbent
- Assumed office 1988
- Designation: Term
- President: 1999–present
- Vice President: 1992–1993
- Director: 1988–1992

Personal details
- Born: 21 October 1964 (age 61)
- Party: Bharatiya Janata Party
- Relations: Umesh Katti (brother)
- Parent: Vishwanath Katti (father)

Ramesh Vishwanath Katti (born 21 October 1964) is an Indian politician. He was a member of the Indian Parliament from 2009 to 2014, representing Chikkodi (Lok Sabha constituency). He is also an Incumbent President of The Belgaum District Central Co-Operative Bank. Katti belongs to the Banajiga community, a sub-sect of Lingayat.

== Office ==
He is rendering services to other Cooperative Institutions including:

- President, The Belgaum District Central Coop. Bank Ltd., Belgaum
- Ex-Chairman, Shri Hiranyakeshi Sahakari Sakkare Karkhane Niyamit
- Sankeshwar (Dist. Belgaum)
- Vice President, National Heavy Engineering Coop. Ltd., Pune
- President, Mahanteshwar Vidya Sansthe
- Bellad Bagewad, Ex-Chairman and Director : The Bellad Bagewadi Urban Souhard Sahakari Bank Niyamit, B. Bagewadi
- Founder : Rahul Katti Sports & Social Club, B.Bagewadi
- Director : Karnataka State Federation of Cooperative Sugar Factories Ltd., Bangalore, Director :
- Krishi Seva Sahakari Bank Ltd., Bellad-Bagewadi, Director :
- Karnataka Ranga Bhoomi Abhivruddhi & Uttejan Sahakari Sangh, Belgaum
- Director : Chamber of Commerce and Industries, Belgaum
- Member Murusavir Vidhyavardhak Sangh Residential School, Shirdhan
- Ex-Director: National Federation of Coop. Sugar Factories Ltd., Delhi

== Awards ==
Ramesh Katti received many awards and honours including "Bharatiya Udyog Ratna Award -96″, "Rashtriya Udyog Ratna Award","National Industrial Excellence Award", "Udyog Vikas Ratna Award", " S. V. Parthasarathy Award " with " Gold Medal " in appreciation of the better adoption of Water Recycling Unit and " Shrestha Sahakari" Award – 2007.
