= Nippani =

- City
- Location in Karnataka, India
- Coordinates: 16.4000°N 74.3833°E
- Country: India
- State: Karnataka
- District: Belagavi district

Government
  - M.P.: Priyanka Satish Jarkiholi
  - M.L.A.: Shashikala Annasaheb Jolle

Area
  - Total: 34 km^{2} (13 sq mi)
- Elevation: 585 m (1,919 ft)

Population (2011)
  - Total: 151,386
  - Rank: Third in district
  - Density: 4,500/km^{2} (12,000/sq mi)

Languages
  - Official: Kannada
- Time zone: UTC+5:30 (IST)
- PIN: 591237
- Telephone code: 08338
- Vehicle registration: KA 23
- Sex ratio: 1000/1000 ♂/♀

Nippani is the third largest city and a taluk in Belgaum District in the Indian state of Karnataka. It is an agricultural and commercial trade center. Nippani and its surrounding villages are known for growing high-quality tobacco that is rolled into beedis.

The City Municipal Council was constituted in 1987, and the taluk in 2018.

== Geography and climate ==
Because Nippani is close to the Western Ghats, it enjoys a good rainy season. Temperature ranges from 16 to 40 °C (61 to 104 °F). Nippani is at its coldest in winter (November through February). It is located 77 km (47.85 mi) from Belagavi and 39 km (24.23 mi) from Kolhapur.

== Demographics ==
As of the 2011 Census of India, Nippani had a population of 62,865. Males constituted 50% of the population; females, 50%. Nippani had an average literacy rate of 57%, higher than India's national average of 59.5%, of which male literacy was 79% and female literacy, 64%. Ten percent of the population was under 6 years of age.

Kannada is the oifficial language, but both Kannada and Marathi are dominantly spoken. The linguistic breakdown is 39.50%, Kannada; 35.41%, Marathi; 17.77%, Urdu; 3.48%, Hindi; 1.59%, Telugu; and 1.55%, Gujarati.

Languages of Nippani City (2011)
1. Kannada (39.5%)
2. Marathi (35.4%)
3. Urdu (17.8%)
4. Hindi (3.48%)
5. Telugu (1.59%)
6. Gujarati (1.55%)
7. Others (0.70%)

== Business ==
Nippani is dependent mostly on agriculture and its local textile industry. It is also well known for its tobacco business, beedi factories, tobacco mills, foundry, tile, and wood businesses; and aluminium pot-making factory.

Nippani is a notable tobacco producer in India, home to a tobacco trade market. Several sugar factories are also located in or near Nippani.

== Education ==
There are several notable institutions of higher education in Nippani, several of which are under the Karnataka Lingayat Education Society (KLE Society), an organisation running 300 institutions engaged in education, health care, and research in Karnataka and Maharashtra. Among these institutions are the following:

KLE's G.I. Bagewadi College of Arts, Commerce & Science became Karnataka's first recipient to receive "A+ accreditation" from India's National Assessment and Accreditation Council (NAAC), in 2017. KLE also built the Independent PU College beside the KLE College of Pharmacy in Nippani.

VSM's Somashekhar R. Kothiwale Institute of Technology, Nippani is the sole engineering college in Nippani Taluk.

Devchand College (formerly Janta College) was established by Padma Bhushan–awardee Shriman Devchandji Shah in 1960, and is affiliated to Shivaji University, Kolhapur. The college also hosts Yashwantrao Chavan Maharashtra Open University, Centre for Distance Education, Shivaji University in Kolhapur.

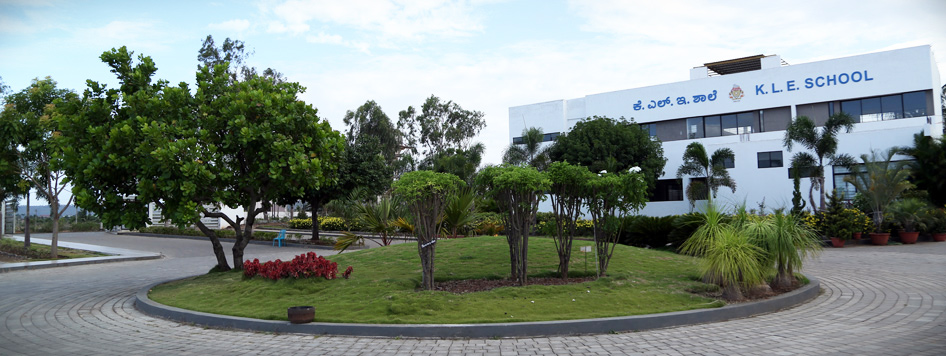
KLE's English-medium CBSE school

KLE's English-medium CBSE school in Nippani was established in 2004.

== Tourism and attractions ==
Located 407 km (252.9 mi) from Mumbai and 166 km (103.15 mi) from Goa. Tourist sites of particular interest in or near Nippani include Ramling Mandir; Tavandi (Stavanidhi); Nipanikar Wada; Samadhi Math; Sai Mandir; and Jawahalal Nehru Lake.

Ramling Mandir is a temple dedicated to Lord Shiva. Situated in the village of Shippur 6 km (3.73 mi)from Nippani, it is believed to be held from Ramayan Yug. Beside its location, which is at the centre of Shippur Hill, it has regular and fresh water sources for the entire year. The temple hosts a feast in the Hindu month of Shravan during the monsoon season.

Tavandi (Stavanidhi), located 5 km (3.11 mi) from Nippani, has four Jain temples. The huge idol of Brahmadev draws people from all social sectors. There is a temple dedicated to Devi Padmavati between the main road and the Tirth Temple. The main temple at Stavanidhi has three Vedis. The first chaitya is dedicated to Bhagwan Surparsvanath, with an idol of Bhagwan Rishabdev of 11 A.D. In the second chaitya is an idol of Bhagwan Parsvanath, known as Navkhand ( "nine pieces"), as well as idols of Yaksha Brahmadev and Devi Padmavati. The third chaitya is dedicated to Yaksha Brahmadev which has a huge idol of Sindoori colour. On the temple's upper storey is a Shassterakut and Chamukha. The images in Kayotsang posture of Bhagwan Neminath, Baghwan Adinath, Bhagwan Parsvanath and Bhagwan Mahavir in Padmasan as Mulnayak are also installed here. A fair is organised in the month of January on the night of Amavasya.

Visitors can stroll into the Nipanikar Wada and view the 19th century wall paintings. Around 4 km (2.49 mi) from Nippani in a village boundary called Shirgupping is a well-preserved aqueduct built by the founder of the city of Nippani H.H. Shrimant, Siddhoji raje Naik Nimbalkar, Nippankar Sarlashkar Desai Sarkar. This water channel is an engineering marvel of 19th centuries water system that served the city for a century, famous among locals by the name "Udatya Bambache Pani". The aqueduct is location and the storage in city is around 5 km (3.11 mi), water root still can be traced by chimney locally known as Udate Bamb.

The Ambhabai Mandir, situated in Mamdapur, is a temple dedicated to Lord Ambhabai.

== Transportation ==
Road

Nippani is connected by road via National Highways 48 (now part of the Golden Quadrilateral connecting Delhi, Haryana, Rajasthan, Gujarat, Maharashtra, Karnataka, and Tamil Nadu).

The North Western Karnataka Road Transport Corporation runs buses to all corners of Karnataka and to neighbouring states. There are also many prominent private bus companies providing services to all major destinations in Karnataka and surrounding states. KSRTC services almost all villages in Karnataka: 92% of the villages (6,743 out of 7,298 villages) and 44% of the villages in other areas (6,743 out of 7,298). KSRTC operates 6,463 schedules per day, covering an effective distance of 23.74 lakh km (1.457 million mi) with a total fleet of 7,599 buses and transporting, on average, 24.57 lakh (2.457 million) passengers per day.

Rail

A new rail track for Belagavi-Karad via Nippani announced in 2016 was to pass through Nippani and ensure rail connectivity to the town.

== Politics ==
Nippani is an Assembly constituency in Chikkodi Lok Sabha constituency. Shashikala Annasaheb Jolle is the MLA of Nippani and Priyanka Satish Jarkiholi is the MP from the Chikkodi Lok Sabha seat as of the 2024 Indian general elections.
