= Chikkodi =

Town in Karnataka, India

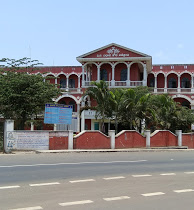
- Mini Vidhanasoudha Chikodi
- Interactive map of Chikkodi
- Coordinates: 16.425466°N 74.5869573°E
- Country: India
- State: Karnataka
- District: Belagavi

Government
  - Body: Town Municipal Council
  - Member of Parliament (MP): Priyankaa Jarakiholi
  - Member of Legislative Assembly (MLA): Ganesh Prakash Hukkeri

Area
  - City: 18.48 km^{2} (7.14 sq mi)
  - Rural: 1,213.74 km^{2} (468.63 sq mi)
- Elevation: 683 m (2,241 ft)

Population (2011)
  - City: 38,307
  - Density: 2,073/km^{2} (5,369/sq mi)
  - Rural: 503,838

Languages
  - Official: Kannada
- Time zone: UTC+5:30 (IST)
- PIN: 591201
- Telephone code: 08338
- Vehicle registration: KA 23
- Website: chikkoditown.mrc.gov.in

Chikkodi is a city, taluka and one of three Subdivisional headquarter, in the Belagavi district of Karnataka, India. Chikodi, Athani, Hukkeri, Raybag, Nipani and Kagwad are the taluks that come under Chikodi Subdivision. It is 75 kilometers from the city of Belgaum,53 kilometres from sangli.65 kilometers from Kolhapur, 51 kilometers from Miraj, 160 kilometers from Hubli, and 570 kilometers from the capital of Karnataka state, Bangalore. Chikodi has many district level offices but it is not designated as a district by the Government of Karnataka. It is one of the major cities that lie in the border between Karnataka and Maharashtra states.

== Geography ==
Chikodi is located at 16.43°N 74.6°E. It has an average elevation of 683 meters (2240 feet). The town has an area of 18.29 km^{2}, and is situated amidst hills. The topography within 2 kilometers of Chikodi contains significant variations in elevation as it is surrounded by range of hills, with a maximum elevation change of 169 meters and an average elevation above sea level of 657 meters. The Krishna river is the chief source of agricultural and drinking water. The other river system of the taluka consists of Vedganga, Dudhaganga and Panchganga.

=== Climate ===
Chikodi has a tropical savanna climate. The wet season is pleasant, windy, and overcast while the dry season is hot and partly cloudy. The dry season lasts for 2.5 months, from 9 March to 23 May, with an average daily high temperature above 34 °C. Chikodi receives rainfall from both the northeast and the southwest monsoons and the wettest months are June–September. The rainy period of the year lasts for 6.1 months, from 14 May to 18 November, with a sliding 31-day rainfall of at least 13 millimeters. The most rain falls during the 31 days centered around 18 July, with an average total accumulation of 239 millimeters. Over the course of the year, the temperature typically varies from 14 °C to 37 °C and is rarely below 13 °C or above 39 °C. December & January are generally cold as compared to the rest of year. The coldest month is January with an average low temperature of 14 °C and the hottest month is April with an average high temperature of 35.7 °C. Winter temperatures rarely drop below 13 °C (55.4 °F), and summer temperatures seldom exceed 38 °C.

Climate data for Chikodi
Month	Jan	Feb	Mar	Apr	May	Jun	Jul	Aug	Sep	Oct	Nov	Dec	Year
Record high °C (°F)	33.6 (92.5)	36 (97)	38.1 (100.6)	40 (104)	39.5 (103.1)	37.1 (98.8)	34.8 (94.6)	34.1 (93.4)	35.8 (96.4)	34.2 (93.6)	34.1 (93.4)	35.2 (95.4)	36.02 (96.84)
Mean daily maximum °C (°F)	29 (84)	33.1 (91.6)	34 (93)	38 (100)	37 (99)	30 (86)	28 (82)	27 (81)	28 (82)	28 (82)	29 (84)	28 (82)	30.84 (87.51)
Daily mean °C (°F)	22 (72)	25 (77)	27 (81)	29 (84)	29 (84)	25 (77)	24 (75)	23 (73)	23 (73)	23 (73)	22 (72)	22 (72)	24.5 (76.1)
Mean daily minimum °C (°F)	14 (57)	16 (61)	19 (66)	22 (72)	24 (75)	23 (73)	22 (72)	21 (70)	19 (66)	17 (63)	15 (59)	14 (57)	18.83 (65.89)
Record low °C (°F)	11.9 (53.4)	13.9 (57.0)	15.4 (59.7)	16.7 (62.1)	18.3 (64.9)	19.1 (66.4)	18.2 (64.8)	17.9 (64.2)	18.5 (65.3)	18.4 (65.1)	17.6 (63.7)	14.1 (57.4)	17.39 (63.30)
Average precipitation mm (inches)	0.68 (0.03)	0.8 (0.03)	8.75 (0.34)	3.94 (0.16)	47.28 (1.86)	81.52 (3.21)	62.41 (2.46)	56.67 (2.23)	32.42 (1.28)	55.4 (2.18)	18.1 (0.71)	5.6 (0.22)	361.37 (14.23)
Average rainy days	1	2	5	5	11	21	20	18	16	11	4	4	123
Average relative humidity (%)	41	31	38	41	58	77	86	91	81	61	55	52	59.33
Mean monthly sunshine hours	307	288.5	310	274.5	308	182.4	84.5	74	170.5	264.5	233.5	280	2,777.4
Average ultraviolet index	6	6	7	7	7	5	5	5	6	6	6	6	6
Source 1: Monthly Weather Forecast
Source 2: Indian Meteorological Department

== Demographics ==
As of 2011 India census, Chikodi had a population of 38,307. Males constitute 51% of the population and females 49%. The average literacy rate is 73%, higher than the national average of 59.5%; with male literacy at 79% and female literacy at 66%.

== See also ==
- Adi (Chikkodi)
- Sri Citramukhi
- Hattarawat
- Karagaon
- Gatti basavann
- Yadur Virupaxi Temple
- Toranahalli Hanuman Temple
