= List of party switchers during Operation Lotus =

The following India politicians switched parties via Operation Kamala to the Bharatiya Janata Party while they were holding elected office.

== Karnataka ==
=== 2008 ===
MLA	Constituency	Party	Notes	Refs
J. Narasimha Swamy	Doddaballapur	Indian National Congress	Won back seat as BJP candidate	
Anand Asnotikar	Karwar	Indian National Congress	Won back seat as BJP candidate	
Jaggesh	Turuvekere	Indian National Congress	Did not contest. Nominated as MLC. Won by JDS candidate M. T. Krishnappa	
Gurupadappa Nagamarapalli	Bidar	Indian National Congress	Did not contest. Won by INC candidate Rahim Khan	
S. V. Ramachandra	Jagalur (ST)	Indian National Congress	Won back seat as BJP candidate	
M Narayanaswamy	Bangarapet	Indian National Congress	Won back seat as BJP candidate	
C. P. Yogeshwara	Channapatna	Indian National Congress	Lost to JDS candidate M. C. Ashwath	
V. Somanna	Govindraj Nagar	Indian National Congress	Lost to INC candidate Priya Krishna	
Balachandra Jarkiholi	Arabhavi	Janata Dal (Secular)	Won back seat as BJP candidate	
Umesh Katti	Hukkeri	Janata Dal (Secular)	Won back seat as BJP candidate	
K. Shivanagouda Naik	Devadurga (ST)	Janata Dal (Secular)	Won back seat as BJP candidate	
D. C. Gourishankar	Madhugiri	Janata Dal (Secular)	Did not contest. Won by JDS candidate Anitha Kumaraswamy	

=== 2019 ===
Name	Office	Date of party switch	Old party	New party	Notes	Refs
R. Shankar	MLA of the 14th Karnataka Legislative Assembly from Ranebennur	14 Nov 2019	Karnataka Pragnyavantha Janatha Party	Bharatiya Janata Party	R. Shankar, who along with 15 other disqualified Congress and JD (S) MLAs joined the BJP.	
R. Roshan Baig	MLA of the 14th Karnataka Legislative Assembly from Shivajinagar	14 Nov 2019	Indian National Congress	Bharatiya Janata Party	R. Shankar, who along with 15 other disqualified Congress and JD (S) MLAs joined the BJP.	
Pratap Gowda Patil	MLA of the 14th Karnataka Legislative Assembly from Maski	14 Nov 2019	Indian National Congress	Bharatiya Janata Party	R. Shankar, who along with 15 other disqualified Congress and JD (S) MLAs joined the BJP.	
M. T. B. Nagaraju	MLA of the 14th Karnataka Legislative Assembly from Hoskote	14 Nov 2019	Indian National Congress	Bharatiya Janata Party	R. Shankar, who along with 15 other disqualified Congress and JD (S) MLAs joined the BJP.	
Shrimant Balasaheb Patil	MLA of the 14th Karnataka Legislative Assembly from Kagawad	14 Nov 2019	Indian National Congress	Bharatiya Janata Party	R. Shankar, who along with 15 other disqualified Congress and JD (S) MLAs joined the BJP.	
Byrati Basavaraj	MLA of the 14th Karnataka Legislative Assembly from Krishnarajapuram	14 Nov 2019	Indian National Congress	Bharatiya Janata Party	R. Shankar, who along with 15 other disqualified Congress and JD (S) MLAs joined the BJP.	
Munirathna	MLA of the 14th Karnataka Legislative Assembly from Rajarajeshwari Nagar	14 Nov 2019	Indian National Congress	Bharatiya Janata Party	R. Shankar, who along with 15 other disqualified Congress and JD (S) MLAs joined the BJP.	
S. T. Somashekhar	MLA of the 14th Karnataka Legislative Assembly from Yeshvanthapura	14 Nov 2019	Indian National Congress	Bharatiya Janata Party	R. Shankar, who along with 15 other disqualified Congress and JD (S) MLAs joined the BJP.	
Ramesh Jarkiholi	MLA of the 14th Karnataka Legislative Assembly from Gokak	14 Nov 2019	Indian National Congress	Bharatiya Janata Party	R. Shankar, who along with 15 other disqualified Congress and JD (S) MLAs joined the BJP.	
Anand Singh	MLA of the 14th Karnataka Legislative Assembly from Vijayanagara	14 Nov 2019	Indian National Congress	Bharatiya Janata Party	R. Shankar, who along with 15 other disqualified Congress and JD (S) MLAs joined the BJP.	
B. C. Patil	MLA of the 14th Karnataka Legislative Assembly from Hirekerur	14 Nov 2019	Indian National Congress	Bharatiya Janata Party	R. Shankar, who along with 15 other disqualified Congress and JD (S) MLAs joined the BJP.	
Mahesh Kumathalli	MLA of the 14th Karnataka Legislative Assembly from Athani	14 Nov 2019	Indian National Congress	Bharatiya Janata Party	R. Shankar, who along with 15 other disqualified Congress and JD (S) MLAs joined the BJP.	
Dr. K. Sudhakar	MLA of the 14th Karnataka Legislative Assembly from Chikkaballapur	14 Nov 2019	Indian National Congress	Bharatiya Janata Party	R. Shankar, who along with 15 other disqualified Congress and JD (S) MLAs joined the BJP.	
Arbail Shivaram Hebbar	MLA of the 14th Karnataka Legislative Assembly from Yellapur	14 Nov 2019	Indian National Congress	Bharatiya Janata Party	R. Shankar, who along with 15 other disqualified Congress and JD (S) MLAs joined the BJP.	
K. Gopalaiah	MLA of the 14th Karnataka Legislative Assembly from Mahalakshmi Layout	14 Nov 2019	Janata Dal (Secular)	Bharatiya Janata Party	R. Shankar, who along with 15 other disqualified Congress and JD (S) MLAs joined the BJP.	
Narayana Gowda	MLA of the 14th Karnataka Legislative Assembly from Krishnarajpet	14 Nov 2019	Janata Dal (Secular)	Bharatiya Janata Party	R. Shankar, who along with 15 other disqualified Congress and JD (S) MLAs joined the BJP.	
Adagur H. Vishwanath	MLA of the 14th Karnataka Legislative Assembly from Hunsur	14 Nov 2019	Janata Dal (Secular)	Bharatiya Janata Party	R. Shankar, who along with 15 other disqualified Congress and JD (S) MLAs joined the BJP.	

== See also ==
- Anti-defection law (India)
- Operation Kamala
- Aaya Ram Gaya Ram
- List of state governments dismissed by the Indian National Congress
