= Satish Jarkiholi =

Indian politician

Satish Laxmanrao Jarkiholi
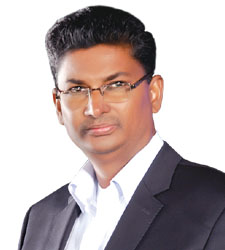

Cabinet Minister Government of Karnataka
- Incumbent
- Assumed office 20 May 2023
- Governor: Thawarchand Gehlot
- Cabinet: Shivakumar ministry Second Siddaramaiah ministry
- Chief Minister: D. K. Shivakumar; Siddaramaiah
- Ministry and Departments: Public Works Department
- Preceded by: C. C. Patil
- In office 22 December 2018 – 23 July 2019
- Governor: Vajubhai Vala
- Cabinet: Second Kumaraswamy ministry
- Chief Minister: H. D. Kumaraswamy
- Ministry and Departments: Forest; Ecology; Environment
- Preceded by: R. Shankar
- Succeeded by: Anand Singh
- In office 2013–2016
- Governor: Vajubhai Vala
- Cabinet: First Siddaramaiah ministry
- Chief Minister: Siddaramaiah
- Ministry and Departments: Excise
- Succeeded by: Manohar Tahasildar

Member of Karnataka Legislative Assembly
- Incumbent
- Assumed office 2008
- Preceded by: Position Established
- Constituency: Yemakanmardi

Working President Karnataka Pradesh Congress Committee
- Incumbent
- Assumed office 11 March 2020

Minister of State for Textiles, Government of Karnataka
- In office 2004–2005

Member of Karnataka Legislative Council
- In office 1998–2008
- Succeeded by: Shashikanth Akkappa Naik
- Constituency: Belgaum District Local Authorities Constituency (MLC)

Personal details
- Born: 1 June 1962 (age 64) Gokak, Mysore State, India
- Party: Indian National Congress(2006 onwards)
- Other political affiliations: Independent(2005-2006) Janata Dal (Secular) (1999 - 2005) Janata Dal (till 1999)
- Spouse: Shakuntala
- Children: Priyanka Jarkiholi; Rahul Jarkiholi
- Relatives: Ramesh Jarkiholi (brother), Balachandra Jarkiholi (brother)
- Profession: Agriculturist, Businessman
- Website: www.satishsugars.com
- As of December, 2015

Satish Laxmanrao Jarkiholi (born 1 June 1962) is an Indian politician from Indian National Congress from Belgaum, Karnataka. He is currently serving as the Minister of Public Works Department in Government of Karnataka and is also a Member of Karnataka Legislative Assembly representing Yemakanmardi constituency since 2008.

He was the forest and environment minister in the H. D. Kumarswamy cabinet from 22 December 2018 to 23 July 2019. He is a former minister of Small scale Industries and also was a Minister of Excise in the Siddaramaiah cabinet.

== Life ==
Satish Jarkiholi was born in a prominent sugarcane-growing family in Belagavi district. His brothers Ramesh Jarkiholi and Balachandra Jarkiholi are both politicians and represent Gokak and Arabhavi legislative constituencies respectively. His daughter Priyanka Jarkiholi is nominated by the Indian National Congress party to contest from the Chikkodi Parliamentary Constituency in 2024 Indian General Election in Karnataka.

== Belgaum Lok Sabha constituency by-election, 2021 ==
He unsuccessfully contested the 2021 by poll from Belgaum Lok sabha seat, vacated after the demise of incumbent MP Suresh Angadi, former Minister of State for Railways. He was defeated by Mangala Suresh Angadi (wife of Suresh Angadi) with a margin of 5,240 votes. Mangala Suresh Angadi was the first politician to defeat Satish Jarkiholi, in his political life spanning about 30 years.
