= Operation Lotus (BJP) =

Incidents of Political corruption in India based on bribery

Operation Lotus, also known as Operation Kamala, is a term coined in 2008 to describe a political strategy used by the Bharatiya Janata Party (BJP) in the Indian state of Karnataka. The operation was led by former minister G. Janardhana Reddy and involved efforts to secure support from legislators of opposition parties. This approach enabled the BJP to bypass the provisions of the anti-defection law and achieve a majority in the state assembly.

The term "Kamala" (or "Kamal") refers to the lotus, which is the electoral symbol of the BJP. Operation Kamala is commonly used in Indian political discussions to describe strategies involving the inducement or persuasion of MLAs and MPs from other parties—particularly the Indian National Congress (INC)—to support the BJP in forming or maintaining power in state legislatures where it does not have an outright majority.

== Delhi ==
Former Delhi Chief Minister Arvind Kejriwal has alleged that "BJP has spent Rs 6,500 crore [65 billion] rupees on buying 277 MLAs, they also tried to buy Aam Aadmi Party’s (AAP) MLAs in Delhi, and they offered 20 crores to each. They brought Rs 800 crores to buy MLAs of Delhi." Kejriwal conducted a floor test in the Delhi Assembly to prove that his government continued to have the majority in the assembly and BJP's alleged Operation Lotus in Delhi had failed to poach AAP MLAs. CM successfully proved his majority in the legislature.

== Goa ==
=== 2019 ===
In July 2019 fourteen members of Indian National Congress switched their parties and joined Bharatiya Janata Party.

List of MLAs
No.	Assembly Constituency		MLA	Notes
No.	#	Name	MLA	Notes
1	22	Siroda	Subhash Shirodkar	In 2017 changed party from Congress to BJP
2	1	Mandrem	Dayanand Sopte	In 2019 changed party from Congress to BJP
3	4	Tivim	Nilkanth Halarnkar	In 2019 changed party from Congress to BJP
4	7	Saligao	Jayesh Salgaonkar	In 2019 changed party from GFP to BJP
5	9	Porvorim	Rohan Khaunte	In 2019 changed party from Independent to BJP
6	11	Panaji	Atanasio Monserrate	In 2019 changed party from Congress to BJP
7	12	Taleigao	Jennifer Monserrate	In 2019 changed party from Congress to BJP
8	13	St. Cruz	Antonio Fernandes	in 2019 changed party from Congress to BJP
9	14	St. Andre	Francisco Silveira	in 2019 changed party from Congress to BJP
10	19	Valpoi	Vishwajit Pratapsingh Rane	In 2019 changed party from Congress to BJP
11	28	Nuvem	Wilfred D'sa	in 2019 changed party from Congress to BJP
12	34	Cuncolim	Clafasio Dias	in 2019 changed party from Congress to BJP
13	35	Velim	Filipe Nery Rodrigues	in 2019 changed party from Congress to BJP
14	36	Quepem	Chandrakant Kavlekar	in 2019 changed party from Congress to BJP
15	40	Canacona	Isidore Fernandes	in 2019 changed party from Congress to BJP
16	21	Ponda	Ravi Naik	In 2021 changed party from Congress to BJP

=== 2022 ===
On 14 September 2022, 8 Congress MLAs switched to BJP. Former Chief Minister of Goa Digambar Kamat and Michael Lobo, along with other 6 Congress MLAs joined Bharatiya Janata Party, after meeting Dr. Pramod Sawant, Chief Minister of Goa from BJP.

No.	Constituency	Name	Remarks
6	Siolim	Delilah Lobo	Defected from Congress to BJP on 14 September 2022
7	Saligao	Kedar Naik	Defected from Congress to BJP on 14 September 2022
8	Calangute	Michael Lobo	Defected from Congress to BJP on 14 September 2022
13	St. Cruz	Rodolfo Louis Fernandes	Defected from Congress to BJP on 14 September 2022
15	Cumbarjua	Rajesh Faldessai	Defected from Congress to BJP on 14 September 2022
24	Mormugao	Sankalp Amonkar	Defected from Congress to BJP on 14 September 2022
28	Nuvem	Aleixo Sequeira	Defected from Congress to BJP on 14 September 2022
31	Margao	Digambar Kamat	Defected from Congress to BJP on 14 September 2022

== Karnataka ==
=== 2008 ===
The BJP won 110 seats in the assembly elections in May 2008, falling three seats short of a simple majority. With the backing of six independents, Yeddyurappa took the oath of office as chief minister to establish the first BJP administration in south India. But to further secure the stability of the administration, the BJP lured seven MLAs—three from the Congress and four from the JD(S), in an operation purportedly funded by mining tycoon and former BJP minister Janardhan Reddy of Bellary—by offering them money and power. The BJP scored five victories in the by-elections, bringing its total in the 224-member assembly to 115. Operation Kamala eventually became the name of the entire exercise.

The MLAs who switched parties during Operation Kamala and resigned include J. Narasimha Swamy, Anand Asnotikar, Jaggesh, Balachandra Jarkiholi, K. Shivanagouda Naik. Umesh Katti and D. C. Gourishankar.

=== 2019 ===
Ramesh Jarkiholi organized 14 other Congress MLAs to resign their posts. Ramesh Jarkiholi was one of the 15 MLAs from Congress and 2 from JD(S) who resigned in July 2019, bringing down the HDK Congress-JD(S) coalition and allowing B.S. Yeddyurappa (BSY) to return to power. After Supreme Court ruling held up their disqualification but allowed them to run, Jarkiholi joined BJP along with all other rebels inducted by Yeddyurappa and other important persons.

Investigations

- On 31 March 2021, the bench of Justice D'Cunha refused to quash the FIR against the sitting Chief Minister of Karnataka B. S. Yediyurappa in a case nicknamed the Operation Kamala case. At the time of the alleged incident, Yediyurappa was the leader of opposition.

Reactions

- In an interview with Deccan Herald in March 2019, B. S. Yediyurappa said "Operation Kamala was not wrong and I don't regret it. It is part of democracy."
- Lehar Singh Siroya claimed that the BJP cadre in the State was “by and large against the Operation Kamala” as that would not help the party in the long term.
- H. D. Kumaraswamy alleged that the BJP used Operation Kamala to affect the defections of MLAs from his government, causing it to fall.

== Madhya Pradesh ==
The crisis started when the long established loyalist Congress politician Jyotiraditya Scindia suddenly resigned from the INC and joined the BJP. This led to many supporters of him resigning from Congress as well. Hardeep Singh Dang resigned from assembly membership and consequently from Indian National Congress, citing in a letter that it was due to 'ignorance from his party', and then joined BJP on March 21, 2020, along with 21 others. Ultimately, this exodus led to the fall of the Kamal Nath government.

== See also ==
- Aaya Ram Gaya Ram
- Law of India
- List of party switchers during Operation Kamala
- List of scandals in India
- Disqualification of convicted representatives in India
- 2019 Maharashtra political crisis
- 2022 Maharashtra political crisis
- 2019 Karnataka Political Crisis
- 2015–2016 Arunachal Pradesh political crisis
- Political corruption
- List of state governments dismissed by the Indian National Congress
