= T. Venkataramanaiah =

Member of the Legislative Assembly, Dodaballapur

Member of Karnataka Legislative Assembly
- In office 2013 – 13 May 2023
- Preceded by: J. Narasimha Swamy
- Succeeded by: Dheeraj Muniraj
- Constituency: Doddaballapur

Personal details
- Born: 4 May 1960 (age 64); Appakaranahalli village in Doddaballapur, Karnataka, India
- Political party: Indian National Congress (2013 –present)
- Spouse: Varalakshmi
- Children: 3
- Education: SSLC

T. Venkataramanaiah (born May 4, 1960), also referred to as Appakaranahalli Venkatesh is an Indian politician, currently serving as a member of the Karnataka Legislative Assembly from Doddaballapur constituency, since 2013. He is a member of the Indian National Congress party.

== Early life ==
T. Venkataramanaiah was born to Timmaiah and Ganga Hanumakka in Appakaranahalli village in Doddaballapur taluk on 4 May 1960. He is also known as Appakaranahalli Venkatesh. He was born into a poverty ridden undivided family of 30 members.

== Education ==
He completed his primary and high school education in Hulikunte village in Doddaballapur taluk. He completed SSLC and joined Nelamangala PU college.

== Marriage ==
He married Varalakshmi in 1989. The couple have three children: Thilak, Kiran and Jeevitha.

== Political life ==
He campaigned for his mother in the Mandal Panchayat election for the first time and played a vital role in her victory. That victory was like a political debut for himself. From that point onwards he was involved in various social services and quickly became popular. He contested for the MLA election from Doddaballapur constituency for the first time in 2013 and secured a surprise victory over many political bigwigs. Later he was re-elected in 2018 from Doddaballapur.
