= Mangala Suresh Angadi =

Indian politician

Mangala Angadi

Member of Parliament, Lok Sabha
- In office 2 May 2021 – 4 June 2024
- Preceded by: Suresh Angadi
- Succeeded by: Jagadish Shettar
- Constituency: Belgaum

Personal details
- Born: 26 October 1963 (age 62) Belgaum, Mysore State, India
- Party: Bharatiya Janata Party
- Spouse: Suresh Angadi (m. 1986; died 2020)
- Children: 2 daughters
- Education: J.S.S. College Gokak (B.Sc)

Mangala Suresh Angadi is an Indian politician and a former Member of Parliament, Lok Sabha from Belagavi parliamentary constituency of Karnataka state. She is the first Woman Member of Parliament from Belagavi.

== Personal life ==
Angadi was married to the late Suresh Angadi, former Minister of State of Railways. She has two daughters.

== Political career ==
She successfully contested the 2021 by poll from Belagavi Lok sabha seat from the Bharatiya Janata Party, after the demise of Suresh Angadi.

She won against the Karnataka Pradesh Congress Committee working president, Satish Jarkiholi by 5,240 votes. She is the first politician to defeat Satish Jarkiholi. He had never lost an election in his political life of about 30 years.
