= Yemkanmardi Assembly constituency =

Legislative Assembly constituency in Karnataka, India

Coordinates: 16.13°N 74.53°E

Yemkanmardi
- Constituency No. 10 for the Karnataka Legislative Assembly

Constituency details
- Country: India
- Region: South India
- State: Karnataka
- District: Belagavi
- Lok Sabha constituency: Chikkodi
- Established: 2008
- Reservation: ST

Member of Legislative Assembly
- 16th Karnataka Legislative Assembly
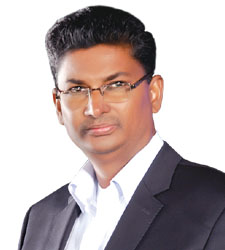
- Incumbent Satish Jarkiholi
- Party: Indian National Congress
- Elected year: 2023

Yemkanmardi Assembly constituency is one of the 224 constituencies in the Karnataka Legislative Assembly of Karnataka, a southern state of India. Yemkanmardi is also part of Chikkodi Lok Sabha constituency.

== Members of the Legislative Assembly ==
Election	Member	Party
2008	Satish Jarkiholi	Indian National Congress
2013	Satish Jarkiholi	Indian National Congress
2018	Satish Jarkiholi	Indian National Congress
2023	Satish Jarkiholi	Indian National Congress

== Election results ==
=== Assembly Election 2023 ===
2023 Karnataka Legislative Assembly election : Yemkanmardi
Party	Candidate	Votes	%	±%
INC	Satish Jarkiholi	100,290	60.25%	▲11.09
BJP	Basavaraj Hundri	43,079	25.88%	▼21.38
JD(S)	Astagi Maruti Mallappa	19,567	11.76%	▲10.53
Independent	Maruti Tippanna Naik	2,052	1.23%	New
NOTA	None of the above	996	0.60%	▼0.54
Margin of victory		57,211	34.37%	▲32.46
Turnout		166,521	82.00%	▲2.53
Total valid votes		166,446		
Registered electors		203,082		▲7.86
INC hold		Swing	▲11.09	

=== Assembly Election 2018 ===
2018 Karnataka Legislative Assembly election : Yemkanmardi
Party	Candidate	Votes	%	±%
INC	Satish Jarkiholi	73,512	49.16%	▼7.62
BJP	Astagi Maruti Mallappa	70,662	47.26%	▲10.03
JD(S)	Shankar Bharama Gasti	1,837	1.23%	▼1.46
NOTA	None of the above	1,702	1.14%	New
KJP	Dr. Yalgund Basanaik Naik	1,299	0.87%	▼0.84
Margin of victory		2,850	1.91%	▼17.64
Turnout		149,627	79.47%	▲2.64
Total valid votes		149,532		
Registered electors		188,279		▲16.03
INC hold		Swing	▼7.62	

=== Assembly Election 2013 ===
2013 Karnataka Legislative Assembly election : Yemkanmardi
Party	Candidate	Votes	%	±%
INC	Satish Jarkiholi	70,726	56.78%	▲14.31
BJP	Astagi Maruti Mallappa	46,376	37.23%	▲20.15
JD(S)	Sanaram Siddappa Naik	3,348	2.69%	▼24.33
KJP	Dr. Yalgund Basanaik Naik	2,129	1.71%	New
Independent	Basavaraj Siddalingappa Sayannavar	1,981	1.59%	New
Margin of victory		24,350	19.55%	▲4.10
Turnout		124,671	76.83%	▲3.89
Total valid votes		124,560		
Registered electors		162,267		▲8.94
INC hold		Swing	▲14.31	

=== Assembly Election 2008 ===
2008 Karnataka Legislative Assembly election : Yemkanmardi
Party	Candidate	Votes	%	±%
INC	Satish Jarkiholi	46,132	42.47%	New
JD(S)	Balagouda Malagouda Patil	29,351	27.02%	New
BJP	Mallappa Laxman Muttennavar	18,557	17.08%	New
Independent	Kolekar Yalappa Hanumant	10,320	9.50%	New
Independent	Maruti Sannappa Gutaguddi	2,179	2.01%	New
BSP	Ramachandra Bhimappa Naik	1,201	1.11%	New
Independent	Pujeri Basavraj Irappa	894	0.82%	New
Margin of victory		16,781	15.45%	
Turnout		108,645	72.94%	
Total valid votes		108,634		
Registered electors		148,948		
INC win (new seat)				

== See also ==
- Yemkanmardi
- Belagavi district
- Chikkodi Lok Sabha constituency
- List of constituencies of Karnataka Legislative Assembly
