= R. L. Jalappa =

Indian politician (1925–2021)

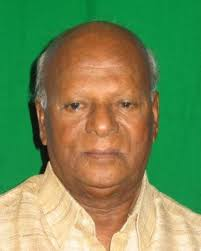

Union Minister of Textiles
- In office 29 June 1996 – 20 January 1998
- Preceded by: Gaddam Venkatswamy
- Succeeded by: Kashiram Rana

Member of the Lok Sabha for Chikballapur
- In office 15 May 1996 – 22 May 2009
- Preceded by: V. Krishna Rao
- Succeeded by: Veerappa Moily

Personal details
- Born: 19 October 1925 Tubagere, Kingdom of Mysore, British India
- Died: 17 December 2021 (aged 96) Kolar, Karnataka, India
- Party: Indian National Congress (till 1979; 1998–present)
- Other political affiliations: Janata Dal (1989–1998); Janata Party (1980–1989); Karnataka Kranti Ranga (1979–1980)
- Spouse: Vijayalaxmi (m. 1982)
- Children: 7 (Including J. Narasimha Swamy)
- Education: Maharaja's College, Mysore
- Profession: Politician; Agriculturist; Educationist

R. Laxminarayanappa Jalappa (19 October 1925 – 17 December 2021) was an Indian politician who was the leader of the Karnataka state branch of the Indian National Congress (INC).

Jalappa was a member of the INC till 1979 when he quit the party to form the Karnataka Kranti Ranga with D. Devaraj Urs, which merged with the Janata Party the following year. Ten years later, he joined the Janata Dal and was elected to the Lok Sabha, the lower House of the Indian Parliament, in 1996, from Chikballapur. He served as the Union Minister of Textiles from 1996 to January 1998, when he quit the party and resigned as minister to rejoin the INC. He was elected to the Lok Sabha again, a member of which he remained till 2009. He also served as the chairman of the Sri Devaraj Urs Medical College situated in Kolar, Karnataka. He died from respiratory and kidney failure in Kolar, on 17 December 2021, at the age of 96.
