= Suresh Angadi =

Indian politician (1955–2020)

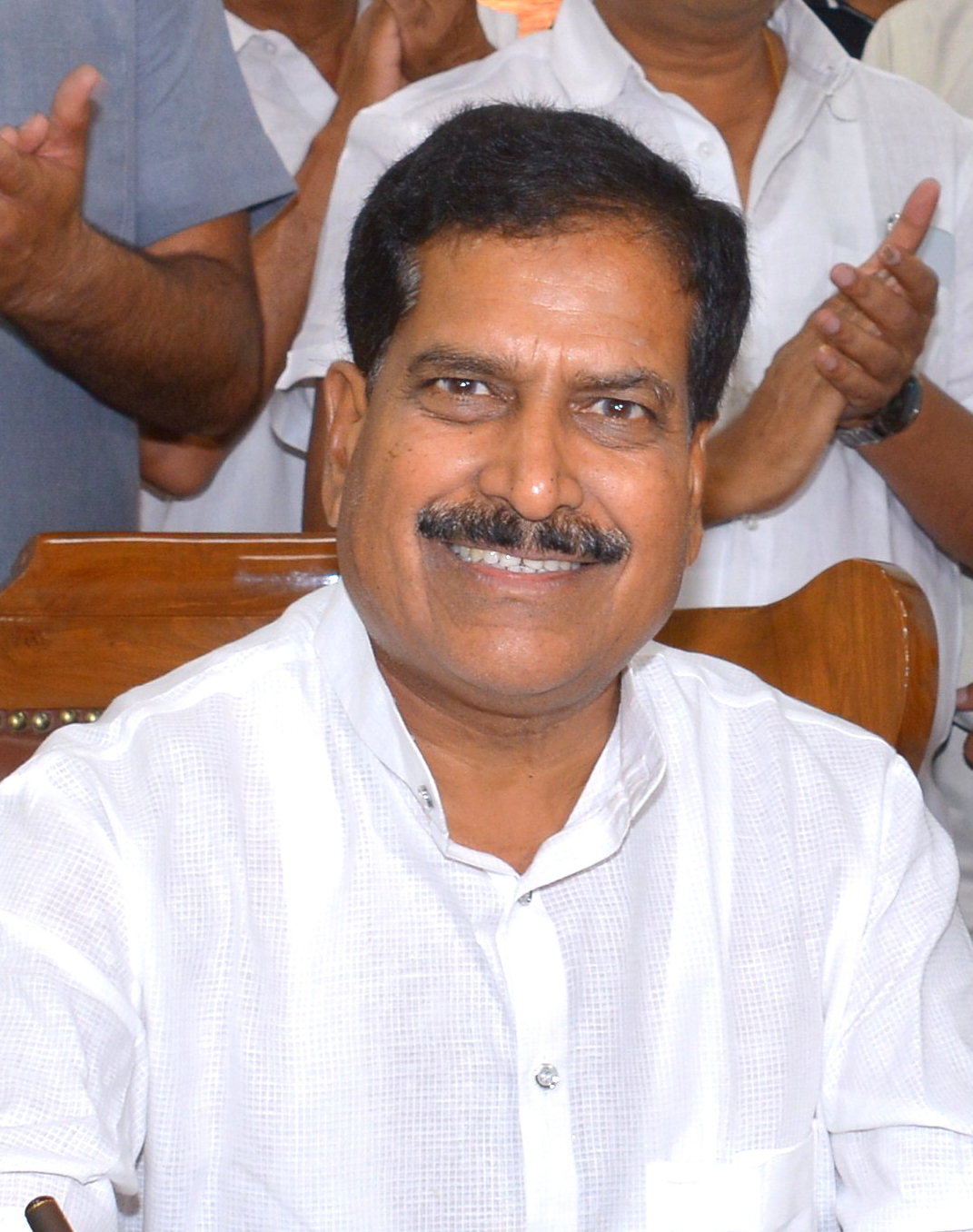
- Angadi assuming office in May 2019

Minister of State for Railways of India
- In office 30 May 2019 – 23 September 2020
- Prime Minister: Narendra Modi
- Minister: Piyush Goyal
- Preceded by: Manoj Sinha
- Succeeded by: Raosaheb Danve, Darshana Jardosh

Member of Parliament, Lok Sabha
- In office 22 May 2004 – 23 September 2020
- Preceded by: Amarsinh Vasantrao Patil
- Succeeded by: Mangala Suresh Angadi
- Constituency: Belgaum

Personal details
- Born: Suresh Channabasappa Angadi; 1 June 1955 Kanvi Karvinakoppa, Bombay State, India
- Died: 23 September 2020 (aged 65) New Delhi, India
- Cause of death: COVID-19
- Party: Bharatiya Janata Party
- Spouse: Mangala Suresh Angadi
- Children: 2 (daughters)
- Education: Educated at S.S.S. Samiti College of Commerce, Belgaum, Karnataka; R.L. Law College, Belgaum, Karnataka
- Political offices: 2001-2004 : President, Belgaum district unit, Bharatiya Janta Party,

Suresh Channabasappa Angadi (1 June 1955 – 23 September 2020) was an Indian politician who served as the Union Minister of State for Railways of India from 30 May 2019 to 23 September 2020. He was Member of Parliament, Lok Sabha from 2004 to September 2020. He was a leader of the Bharatiya Janata Party from Karnataka.

He was elected to the Lok Sabha from Belgaum for four consecutive terms starting in 2004 (14th Lok Sabha) and was reelected in 2009, 2014, and 2019. He never lost an election.

== Early life ==
Suresh Angadi was born on 1 June 1955 to Somavva and Chanabasappa in an agricultural family in Kanvi Karvinakoppa near Belgaum. He graduated with a bachelor's degree in commerce from the S.S.S. Samithi College of Commerce in Belgaum. He also then obtained his law degree from Raja Lakhamgouda Law College in Belgaum.

== Political career ==
Angadi began his political career in 1996 with the Bharatiya Janata Party as the vice-president of the party's Belagavi district unit. In 2001 he was nominated as the president of the district unit and continued to hold that post until he was nominated as the party's candidate for the Belgaum Lok Sabha constituency in 2004. He defeated his opponent, the Indian National Congress candidate, and became a Member of the 14th Lok Sabha. He was then re-elected to Lok Sabha from Belgaum in 2009, 2014, and 2019. He held the distinction of never having lost an election.

In May 2019, Angadi became Minister of State for Railways and served in that position until his death in September 2020. As a minister, he approved the Suburban Commuter Rail project in Bangalore. He also signed a Memorandum of understanding (MoU) with the Bangalore International Airport for the building of a railway station near the airport that would provide connectivity to the center of the city. The station was to be built by BIAL and handed over to the Indian Railways for operations and maintenance.

Some of the other projects advanced by Angadi as the Minister of State for Railways included the country's first private and the longest 'roll-on, roll-off' freight service for goods trucks along the 682 kilometre route between Bangalore and Solapur. As the Minister of State for Railways, he also introduced the direct recruitment examination to the railways in 2019, with over 4.7 million candidates appearing in the examination that was conducted in 15 languages. In 2019, he had also signed a MoU with the Confederation of Indian Industry to drive energy efficiency and pilot projects aimed at setting up net-zero buildings and mechanisms for sharing of energy management practices between the industry association and the Indian Railways. He had announced a call for 150 railway stations across the country to be green certified by 2020.

In his 16-month tenure as the Minister of State for Railways he was credited with introducing over 50 train services just in the South Western division alone. At the beginning of the COVID-19 lockdown in India, he introduced special trains across states in India, including 31 pairs of special Rajdhani express trains and 254 pairs of special mail and express trains, aimed at enabling travel of migrant labour.

He also headed the Suresh Angadi Education Foundation, which runs educational institutions across Karnataka.

== Death ==
Angadi tested positive for COVID-19 on 11 September 2020, during the COVID-19 pandemic in India, and was initially asymptomatic. He was later hospitalised at AIIMS hospital in New Delhi and died on 23 September 2020, at the age of 65, making him the first Indian Union minister to die of COVID-19. Given the ongoing COVID-19 restrictions his body was not allowed to be transported to Belgaum and Angadi was buried as per the COVID-19 protocol in the Lingayat-Veerashaiva burial ground at Sector 24, Dwarka in Delhi.

Lok Sabha
Preceded by Amarsinh Vasantrao Patil	Member of Parliament for Belgaum; 2004 – 2020	Succeeded by Mangala Suresh Angadi
