= President's rule =

Indian law of suspension of state government

In India, President's rule is the suspension of state government and imposition of direct Union government rule in a state. Under Article 356 of the Constitution of India, if a state government is unable to function according to Constitutional provisions, the Union government can take direct control of the state machinery. Subsequently, executive authority is exercised through the union-appointed governor, who has the authority to appoint other administrators to assist them. The administrators are usually nonpartisan retired civil servants not native to the state.

When a state government is functioning correctly, it is run by an elected Council of Ministers responsible to the state's legislative assembly. The council is led by the chief minister, who is the chief executive of the state; the Governor is only a constitutional head. However, during President's rule, the Council of Ministers is dissolved, later on vacating the office of Chief Minister. Furthermore, the Legislative Assembly is either prorogued or dissolved, necessitating a new election.

Prior to 2019, the constitution of the state of Jammu and Kashmir had a similar system of Governor's rule, under its Section 92. The state's governor issued a proclamation, after obtaining the consent of the President of India allowing Governor's rule for up to six months after which President's rule under Article 356 of the Constitution of India could be imposed. After the revocation of Article 370, President's rule applies to Jammu and Kashmir under section 73 (since Article 356 of Constitution of India does not apply to union territories) of Jammu and Kashmir Reorganisation Act, 2019.

Following the 1994 landmark judgment in S. R. Bommai v. Union of India, the Supreme Court of India restricted arbitrary impositions of President's rule.

Chhattisgarh and Telangana are the only states where the President's rule has never been imposed so far.

== Imposition in state ==
In practice, President's rule has been imposed in a State under any one of the following different circumstances:

- A state Assembly is unable to elect a leader as Chief Minister for a time prescribed by the Governor of that State, at the Will of Governor.
- Breakdown of a coalition leading to the Chief Minister not having majority support in the Assembly; and the Chief minister fails/will definitely fail to prove otherwise, within a time prescribed by the Governor of that state.
- Loss of majority in the Assembly due to a vote of no-confidence in the house.
- Elections postponed for unavoidable reasons like war, epidemic, pandemic or natural disasters.
- On the report of the Governor of the State that the State's constitutional machinery or legislature fails to abide by Constitutional norms.

If approved by both Houses, President's rule can continue for 6 months. It can be extended for a maximum of 3 years with the approval of the Parliament done every 6 months; however in extreme rare cases it can be extended repeatedly if the Election Commission of India recommends that elections are not possible. If the Lok Sabha is dissolved during this time, the rule is valid for 30 days from the first sitting of the new Lok Sabha provided that this continuance has already been approved by Rajya Sabha. The 44th Amendment Act of 1978 introduced a new provision to put a restraint on the power of Parliament to extend the President's rule in a state. According to this provision, the president's rule can only be extended over a year, under the following conditions:

- There is already a national emergency throughout India, or in the whole or any part of the state.
- The Election Commission certifies that elections cannot be conducted in the state.

President's rule can be revoked at any time by the President and does not need Parliament's approval.

Until the mid-1990s, President's rule was often imposed in states through the abuse of authority of Governors who were in collusion with the Union government. The Supreme Court of India in March 1994 established a precedent in S. R. Bommai v. Union of India, due to which such abuse has been drastically reduced.

== Imposition in Union territories with a Legislative Assembly ==
Article 356 is not applicable to Union territories, so there are many ways by which President's rule can be imposed in different Union territories with a Legislative Assembly.

=== Jammu and Kashmir ===
Until the revocation of special status and bifurcation into two Union territories, President's rule applied after the application of Governor's rule under the erstwhile state's constitution for 6 months.

After the revocation and bifurcation, the reorganized union territory of Jammu and Kashmir is subject to the section 73 of the Jammu and Kashmir Reorganization Act, 2019, which is used to impose President's rule as the Article 356 is not applicable to Union Territories. The provision states:

73. If the President, on receipt of a report from the Lieutenant Governor of Union territory of Jammu and Kashmir, or otherwise, is satisfied,—

(a) that a situation has arisen in which the administration of the Union territory of Jammu and Kashmir cannot be carried on in accordance with the provisions of this Act, or

(b) that for the proper administration of Union territory of Jammu and Kashmir it is necessary or expedient so to do,

the President may, by order, suspend the operation of all or any of the provisions of this Act for such period as he thinks fit and makes such incidental and consequential provisions as

may appear to him to be necessary or expedient for administering the Union territory of Jammu and Kashmir in accordance with the provisions of this Act.

=== Delhi ===
In NCT of Delhi, President's rule is applied on the basis of Article 239AB of the Constitution of India (as the Article 356 is not applicable to Union Territories) which reads thus:

239AB. – If the President, on receipt of a report from the Lieutenant Governor or otherwise, is satisfied—

(a) that a situation has arisen in which the administration of the National Capital Territory cannot be carried on in accordance with the provisions of article 239AA or of any law made in pursuance of that article; or

(b) that for the proper administration of the National Capital Territory it is necessary or expedient so to do, the President may by order suspend the operation of any provision of Article 239AA or of all or any of the

provisions of any law made in pursuance of that article for such period and subject to such conditions as maybe specified in such law and make such incidental and consequential provisions as may appear to him to be necessary or expedient for administering the National Capital Territory in accordance with the provisions of article 239 and article 239AA.

=== Puducherry ===
In the union territory of Puducherry, President's rule is applied on the basis of Article 51 of the Government of Union Territories Act, 1963. Which thus reads

51. Provision in case of failure of constitutional machinery. — If the President, on receipt of a report from the Administrator of the Union territory or otherwise, is satisfied,―

(a) that a situation has arisen in which the administration of the Union territory cannot be carried on in accordance with the provisions of this Act, or

(b) that for the proper administration of the Union territory it is necessary or expedient so to do, the President may, by order, suspend the operation of all or any of the provisions of this Act for such period as he thinks fit and make such incidental and consequential provisions as may appear to him to be necessary or expedient for administering the Union territory in accordance with the provisions of article 239.

== Misuse and criticism ==
Article 356 gives wide powers to the Union government to assert its authority over a state if civil unrest occurs and the state government does not have the means to end it. Though the purpose of this article is to give more powers to the Union government to preserve the unity and integrity of the nation, it has often been misused by the ruling parties at the centre, who used it as a pretext to dissolve state governments ruled by political opponents. Thus, it is seen by many as a threat to the federal state system. Since the adoption of the Indian constitution in 1950, the Union government has used this 134 times to dissolve elected state governments by imposing President's rule.

The article was used for the first time in Punjab on 20 June 1951. It was next used in the state of Patiala and East Punjab States Union (PEPSU) in 1953, and then in 1959 to dismiss the Communist Party of India–led government in Kerala in the aftermath of anti-communist protests. In the 1970s and 1980s, it was common for the Union government to dismiss state governments led by opposition parties. The Indira Gandhi regime and post-emergency Janata Party were noted for this practice. Indira Gandhi's government between 1966 and 1977 is known to have imposed President's rule 39 times in different states. Similarly, the Janata Party which came to power after the emergency issued President's rule in 9 states which were ruled by Congress.

The practice was limited only after the Supreme Court established strict guidelines for imposing President's rule in its ruling on the S. R. Bommai v. Union of India case in 1994. This landmark judgement has helped curtail the widespread abuse of Article 356. The judgement established strict guidelines for imposing President's rule. Subsequent pronouncements by the Supreme Court in Jharkhand and other states have further limited the scope for misuse of Article 356. Only since the early 2000s has the number of cases of imposition of President's rule has been drastically reduced.

Article 356 has always been the focal point of a wider debate of the federal structure of government in Indian polity. During debates in the Constituent Assembly of India regarding emergency provisions of the Constitution of India, B. R. Ambedkar argued for their inclusion under the assumption "that such articles will never be called into operation and that they would remain a dead letter". The Sarkaria Commission Report on Centre-State Relations 1983 has recommended that Article 356 must be used "very sparingly, in extreme cases, as a measure of last resort, when all the other alternatives fail to prevent or rectify a breakdown of Constitutional machinery in the state".

== List of instances ==
‡ Denotes currently imposed President rule

List of instances of President's rule being applied
State	Term	Date of imposition	Date of revocation	Duration	Reason(s) to impose the President's rule
Andhra Pradesh	1	18 January 1973	10 December 1973	327 days	Breakdown of law & order due to Jai Andhra Agitation, in CM P. V. Narasimha Rao's tenure.
Andhra Pradesh	2	1 March 2014	8 June 2014	99 days	Political impasse following the resignation of CM Kiran Kumar Reddy and several other congress party legislators from the Government as well as the Party, in protest against Indian Parliament passing Andhra Pradesh Reorganisation Bill to bifurcate united Andhra Pradesh and create a separate Telangana state. President's rule revoked from Telangana areas on 2 June 2014 and bifurcated Andhra Pradesh areas on 8 June 2014. President rule reimposed unlawfully by the President after the two months time limit without taking approval of the Parliament under Article 356.
Andhra State	1	15 November 1954	28 March 1955	133 days	Loss of majority.
Arunachal Pradesh	1	3 November 1979	18 January 1980	76 days	Loss of majority following defections in a fluid political environment during Janata party rule at the centre.
Arunachal Pradesh	2	25 January 2016	19 February 2016	26 days	21 Congress MLAs joined hands with 11 of the BJP and two Independents, making the contemporary government a minority. Supreme Court declared the imposition of president rule as ultra vires and reinstated the dismissed Congress led government in the state. In a landmark judgement, it found fault with the unconstitutional role played by the Governor by interfering in the activities of legislatures and speaker of the Vidhan Sabha
Assam	1	12 December 1979	6 December 1980	360 days	'Assam Agitation' against illegal foreign nationals staying in Assam started to take roots under the leadership of the All Assam Students' Union (AASU). The violence fuelled by United Liberation Front of Asom (ULFA) resulted in breakdown of law and order.
Assam	2	30 June 1981	13 January 1982	197 days	Congress (I) government led by Anwara Taimur representing immigrant minorities collapsed following intensification of 'Assam Agitation' against illegal foreign national staying in Assam.
Assam	3	19 March 1982	27 February 1983	345 days	Congress (I) government led by Keshab Gogoi representing ethnic Asom people collapsed following continued violence in Assam.
Assam	4	28 November 1990	30 June 1991	214 days	Government dismissed in spite of AGP CM Prafulla Mahanta enjoying majority support in Assembly. The dismissal was triggered apparently by the threat to internal security due to banned organisation ULFA's activities. During the president's rule, Operation Bajrang was launched to flush out ULFA militants.
Bihar	1	29 June 1968	26 February 1969	242 days	Loss of majority following defections in a fluid political environment.
Bihar	2	4 July 1969	16 February 1970	227 days	Loss of majority following defections in a fluid political environment due to split in ruling Congress party
Bihar	3	9 January 1972	19 March 1972	70 days	Loss of majority following defections in a fluid political environment.
Bihar	4	30 April 1977	24 June 1977	55 days	Government dismissed in spite of Jagannath Mishra enjoying majority support in Assembly.
Bihar	5	17 February 1980	8 June 1980	112 days	Government dismissed in spite of Ram Sundar Das enjoying majority support in Assembly.
Bihar	6	28 March 1995	4 April 1995	7 days	President's rule imposed for a brief period of one week to facilitate passage of vote on account (to permit day-to-day government expenses in Bihar) by Parliament while awaiting the results of Assembly elections held during the Chief Ministership of Lalu Prasad.
Bihar	7	12 February 1999	8 March 1999	24 days	Breakdown of law and order, killings of 11 Dalits at Narayanpur. The Vajpayee Government, revoked the president's rule within 26 days since the coalition did not have a majority in the Rajya Sabha.
Bihar	8	7 March 2005	24 November 2005	262 days	Indecisive outcome of elections. In a landmark judgement, Supreme Court ruled that the imposition of the president's rule without giving the chance to the elected legislatures to form new government is unconstitutional and mala fide act by the president.
Delhi	1	16 February 2014	14 February 2015	363 days	Arvind Kejriwal resigned as Chief Minister after failing to table the Jan Lokpal Bill in the Delhi Assembly.
Goa	1	14 December 1990	25 January 1991	42 days	C.M. resigned consequent upon his disqualification by High Court – No other Government found viable.
Goa	2	10 February 1999	9 June 1999	119 days	Loss of majority and no alternate claimant to form next government.
Goa	3	4 March 2005	7 June 2005	95 days	Government dismissed after controversial confidence vote secured in the Assembly by CM Pratap Sinh Rane.
Goa, Daman and Diu	1	3 December 1966	5 April 1967	123 days	The Union Territory of Goa's Assembly was dissolved to conduct an opinion poll to determine whether Goa should be merged with Maharashtra.
Goa, Daman and Diu	2	27 April 1979	16 January 1980	264 days	Loss of majority following split in the ruling MGP Party.
Gujarat	1	13 May 1971	17 March 1972	309 days	Loss of majority following vertical split in Congress during 1969 presidential election.
Gujarat	2	9 February 1974	18 June 1975	1 year, 129 days	Chimanbhai Patel led Congress government resigned due to Navnirman Movement Anti-Corruption protests. The protesters forced MLA's resignations, forcing dissolution of assembly.
Gujarat	3	12 March 1976	24 December 1976	287 days	"Non-Passage" of budget leading to collapse of government.
Gujarat	4	17 February 1980	7 June 1980	111 days	Government dismissed in spite of Babubhai J Patel enjoying majority support in the Assembly
Gujarat	5	19 September 1996	23 October 1996	34 days	Government dismissed following a controversial confidence vote. The Assembly was placed in suspended animation, which led to subsequent installation of Vaghela government, supported by Congress.
Haryana	1	21 November 1967	21 May 1968	182 days	Government dismissed in spite of having a tenuous majority.
Haryana	2	30 April 1977	21 June 1977	52 days	Government dismissed in spite of B D Gupta enjoying majority support in Assembly.
Haryana	3	6 April 1991	23 June 1991	78 days	Rebellion in the ruling party.
Himachal Pradesh	1	30 April 1977	22 June 1977	53 days	Government dismissed in spite of Thakur Ram Lal enjoying majority support in Assembly.
Himachal Pradesh	2	15 December 1992	3 December 1993	353 days	Government dismissed in the aftermath of the destruction of Babri Masjid-Ram Janmasthan in Uttar Pradesh.
Jammu and Kashmir (State)	1	27 March 1977	9 July 1977	104 days	Sheikh Abdullah led National Conference government bowed out after being reduced to a minority following withdrawal of support by the Congress Party.
Jammu and Kashmir (State)	2	7 March 1986	6 November 1986	244 days	Loss of majority.
Jammu and Kashmir (State)	3	19 January 1990	9 October 1996	6 years, 264 days	Increased Militancy, Exodus of Kashmiri Hindus & breakdown of law & order
Jammu and Kashmir (State)	5	10 July 2008	5 January 2009	179 days	Loss of majority following collapse of coalition. CM Gulam Nabi Azad's decision to transfer land for Amarnath pilgrimage led to PDP pulling out of coalition Govt.
Jammu and Kashmir (State)	6	9 January 2015	1 March 2015	51 days	Failure of Government formation after fractured verdict in Assembly elections. BJP & PDP reached an understanding to form an alliance to form Government in J&K.
Jammu and Kashmir (State)	7	8 January 2016	4 April 2016	87 days	Death of chief minister Mufti Mohammad Sayeed.
Jammu and Kashmir (State)	8	19 June 2018	30 October 2019	1 year, 133 days	Resignation of the Chief Minister following loss of coalition partner. On 31 October 2019, Jammu and Kashmir state was split into two union territories, UT of Jammu and Kashmir and UT of Ladakh.
Jammu and Kashmir (Union Territory)	1	31 October 2019	13 October 2024	4 years, 348 days	Imposed under section 73 of Jammu and Kashmir Reorganisation Act, 2019 (Article 356 does not apply to Union Territories)
Jharkhand	1	19 January 2009	30 December 2009	345 days	Political instability due to CM Shibu Soren's resignation following defeat in Tamar bypolls.
Jharkhand	2	1 June 2010	11 September 2010	102 days	Loss of majority.
Jharkhand	3	18 January 2013	13 July 2013	176 days	Loss of majority BJP's ruling coalition partner JMM withdrew its support to the government pushing it into a minority. Chief Minister Arjun Munda resigned and sought dissolution of the state Assembly.
Karnataka	1	27 March 1971	20 March 1972	359 days	Loss of majority.
Karnataka	2	31 December 1977	27 February 1978	58 days	Government dismissed in spite of Congress CM Devraj Urs enjoying majority support in Assembly.
Karnataka	3	21 April 1989	30 November 1989	223 days	Loss of majority of CM S. R. Bommai, followed by dissolution of Assembly. On an appeal by S. R. Bommai, in a landmark judgement delivered in 1994, the Indian Supreme Court laid out the procedure to be followed before dissolving an elected assembly. The historic ruling in this case reduced the scope for misuse of Article 356 by future central governments and governors.
Karnataka	4	10 October 1990	17 October 1990	7 days	Government of Veerendra Patil dismissed by Prime Minister V. P. Singh and state was placed under president's rule with the assembly placed in suspended animation until next chief Minister was elected.
Karnataka	5	9 October 2007	12 November 2007	34 days	Loss of majority.
Karnataka	6	20 November 2007	30 May 2008	192 days	Loss of majority.
Kerala	1	31 July 1959	22 February 1960	206 days	Government dismissed in spite of Communist CM EMS Namboodiripad enjoying majority support in Assembly.
Kerala	2	10 September 1964	6 March 1967	2 years, 177 days	Loss of majority followed by indecisive outcome of elections.
Kerala	3	4 August 1970	3 October 1970	60 days	Loss of majority.
Kerala	4	5 December 1979	25 January 1980	51 days	Loss of majority.
Kerala	5	21 October 1981	28 December 1981	68 days	Loss of majority due to withdrawal of support by Congress(S) and Kerala Congress(M).
Kerala	6	17 March 1982	24 May 1982	68 days	Loss of majority following defection of Lonappan Nambadan.
Madhya Pradesh	1	30 April 1977	23 June 1977	54 days	Government dismissed in spite of Shyama Charan Shukla enjoying majority support in Assembly.
Madhya Pradesh	2	17 February 1980	9 June 1980	113 days	Government dismissed in spite of Sundar Lal Patwa enjoying majority support in Assembly.
Madhya Pradesh	3	15 December 1992	7 December 1993	357 days	Govt. dismissed in the aftermath of Babri Masjid-Ram Janmasthan destruction in Uttar Pradesh.
Maharashtra	1	17 February 1980	9 June 1980	113 days	Govt. dismissed in spite of Sharad Pawar enjoying majority support in the Assembly.
Maharashtra	2	28 September 2014	31 October 2014	33 days	Govt. dismissed since Congress Separated from its allies NCP and Others.
Maharashtra	3	12 November 2019	23 November 2019	11 days	No party could form a government after a fractured election verdict and Shiv Sena broke the pre-poll alliance it had with the BJP. See also: 2019 Maharashtra political crisis.
Manipur	1	25 October 1967	19 February 1968	117 days	Short lived ministry collapsed following resignation of speaker, resulting in neither ruling nor opposition congress having a clear majority in the assembly. Assembly kept in suspended animation.
Manipur	2	16 October 1969	20 March 1972	2 years, 156 days	Violent secessionist insurgency and statehood demands resulted in breakdown of law and order.
Manipur	3	28 March 1973	4 March 1974	341 days	President's rule was imposed even though the opposition had a "tenuous" majority and could have formed a government.
Manipur	4	16 May 1977	26 June 1977	41 days	Collapse of Government following defections.
Manipur	5	14 November 1979	13 January 1980	60 days	Discontent within Janata Party Government and corruption charges led to dismissal of government and dissolution of Assembly.
Manipur	6	28 February 1981	19 June 1981	111 days	Incumbent Government fell following defections. Governor did not permit an alternate government to be formed by People's Democratic Front on the basis of his assessment regarding stability of the proposed ministry.
Manipur	7	7 January 1992	8 April 1992	92 days	Incumbent coalition Government fell following defections. president's rule imposed keeping assembly in suspension.
Manipur	8	31 December 1993	13 December 1994	347 days	1000 persons died in Naga-Kuki clashes and continued violence.
Manipur	9	2 June 2001	5 March 2002	276 days	Loss of majority.
Manipur	10	13 February 2025	3 February 2026	355 days	Chief Minister N. Biren Singh resigned following the 2023–2025 Manipur violence amidst a crisis of possible no-confidence motion. Assembly put under suspended animation. Chief Minister Yumnam Khemchand Singh appointed new CM & President’s rule finally lifted after nearly 1 year.
Meghalaya	1	11 October 1991	5 February 1992	117 days	The Centre imposed president's rule in Meghalaya in the wake of a political crisis after the then Speaker PR Kyndiah suspended five MLAs, mostly independents, on grounds of defection.
Meghalaya	2	19 March 2009	13 May 2009	56 days	Government dismissed after controversial confidence vote secured in the Assembly by CM Donkupar Roy.
Mizoram	1	11 May 1977	2 June 1978	1 year, 22 days	Mizo Union Ministry led by Chief Minister Chhunga resigned in May 1977, ostensibly to facilitate the progress of peace talks.
Mizoram	2	11 November 1978	8 May 1979	178 days	Chief Minister Sailo's refusal to grant undue favours caused dissension in his party which led to the fall of his government and imposition of president's rule.
Mizoram	3	7 September 1988	24 January 1989	139 days	Defections reduced the Government to minority.
Nagaland	1	22 March 1975	25 November 1977	2 years, 248 days	Defections and counter defections led to imposition of president's rule.
Nagaland	2	7 August 1988	25 January 1989	171 days	The state was under a brief spell of central rule again after the Hokishe Sema-led Congress government was reduced to a minority. The decision was challenged in the Supreme Court in held to be invalid in 1994.
Nagaland	3	2 April 1992	22 February 1993	326 days	Fluid party position and deteriorating law and order situation.
Nagaland	4	3 January 2008	12 March 2008	69 days	Government dismissed after controversial confidence vote secured in the Assembly by CM Neiphiu Rio.
Odisha	1	25 February 1961	23 June 1961	118 days	Harekrishna Mahtab led Congress-Gantantra Parishad Minority Government resigned on 21 February 1961 due to differences in the Congress Party. President's rule was imposed on 25 February 1961.
Odisha	2	11 January 1971	3 April 1971	82 days	Break-up of coalition.
Odisha	3	3 March 1973	6 March 1974	1 year, 3 days	Facing imminent collapse of government, incumbent chief minister recommended dissolution of assembly and fresh elections.
Odisha	4	16 December 1976	29 December 1976	13 days	Chief Minister Nandini Satpathy was forced out and assembly placed under suspended animation. A new Congress government was sworn in after revocation of president's rule.
Odisha	5	30 April 1977	26 June 1977	57 days	Government dismissed in spite of Binayak Acharya enjoying majority support in Assembly.
Odisha	6	17 February 1980	9 June 1980	113 days	Government dismissed in spite of Nilamani Routray enjoying majority support in Assembly.
Patiala and East Punjab States Union	1	4 March 1953	7 March 1954	1 year, 3 days	President's rule was invoked in the erstwhile PEPSU (Patiala and East Punjab States Union ) State when the Akali Dal government, led by Gian Singh Rarewala, was dismissed.
Puducherry	1	18 September 1968	17 March 1969	180 days	Assembly was dissolved and president's rule imposed as opposition parties had a chance to form a government after the fall of the Congress government.
Puducherry	2	3 January 1974	6 March 1974	62 days	Assembly dissolved after fall of DMK government following decision of two ministers to join newly formed AIADMK.
Puducherry	3	28 March 1974	2 July 1977	3 years, 96 days	Fall of coalition government of AIADMK, Congress(O) following division of votes by Congress(R) and DMK. The Assembly was dissolved.
Puducherry	4	12 November 1978	16 January 1980	1 year, 65 days	Fall of government due to political instability.
Puducherry	5	24 June 1983	16 March 1985	1 year, 265 days	Government dismissed following withdrawal of Congress(I) from coalition government. In spite of incumbent chief minister asking for an opportunity to prove his majority on the floor of the house, the assembly was dissolved.
Puducherry	6	12 January 1991	4 July 1991	173 days	DMK Government dismissed in spite of having a majority in the Assembly.
Puducherry	7	25 February 2021	7 May 2021	71 days	Congress Government resigned due to loss of majority and no alternate claimant to form next government.
Punjab	1	20 June 1951	17 April 1952	302 days	Prime Minister Jawaharlal Nehru kept the Punjab Assembly in suspension for nine months and 28 days to help the state Congress government get its act together.
Punjab	2	5 July 1966	1 November 1966	119 days	State administration was taken over, ostensibly to facilitate bifurcation of Punjab state into two, Punjab and Haryana.
Punjab	3	23 August 1968	17 February 1969	178 days	Break-up of coalition.
Punjab	4	15 June 1971	17 March 1972	276 days	Following poor performance in March, 1971 Lok Sabha Elections, incumbent Chief Minister advised dissolving state assembly and holding fresh elections to state legislature.
Punjab	5	30 April 1977	20 June 1977	51 days	Government dismissed in spite of Giani Zail Singh enjoying majority support in Assembly.
Punjab	6	17 February 1980	7 June 1980	111 days	Government dismissed in spite of Parkash Singh Badal enjoying majority support in Assembly.
Punjab	7	6 October 1983	29 September 1985	1 year, 358 days	Many Khalistani separatist groups announced the creation of Khalistan.
Punjab	8	11 May 1987	23 February 1992	4 years, 288 days	Breakdown of law and order by several militant groups.
Rajasthan	1	13 March 1967	26 April 1967	44 days	Indecisive outcome of elections.
Rajasthan	2	30 April 1977	22 June 1977	53 days	Government dismissed in spite of Hari Dev Joshi enjoying majority support in Assembly.
Rajasthan	3	17 February 1980	5 June 1980	109 days	Government dismissed in spite of Bhairon Singh Shekhawat enjoying majority support in Assembly.
Rajasthan	4	15 December 1992	4 December 1993	354 days	Government dismissed in spite of Bhairon Singh Shekhawat enjoying majority support in Assembly.
Sikkim	1	18 August 1978	17 October 1979	1 year, 60 days	Loss of majority following split in Kazi Lhendup Dorji led Janata Party government. The central government imposed president's rule and followed up with electoral reforms before ordering fresh elections.
Sikkim	2	25 May 1984	8 March 1985	287 days	Congress Government formed following induced collapse of Nar Bahadur Bhandari Sikkim Janata Parishad Government was dismissed as it did not enjoy a majority in the Assembly.
Tamil Nadu	1	31 January 1976	30 June 1977	1 year, 150 days	The government headed by former chief minister M. Karunanidhi was dismissed by former prime minister Indira Gandhi in spite enjoying majority in the legislative assembly, due to charges of corruption while the Sarkaria Commission was set up to probe the allegations.
Tamil Nadu	2	17 February 1980	9 June 1980	113 days	The government headed by former chief minister M. G. Ramachandran was dismissed by former prime minister Indira Gandhi in spite enjoying majority in the legislative assembly.
Tamil Nadu	3	30 January 1988	27 January 1989	363 days	The government headed by former chief minister V. N. Janaki Ramachandran was dismissed by former prime minister Rajiv Gandhi after controversial confidence vote secured by her in the legislative assembly.
Tamil Nadu	4	30 January 1991	24 June 1991	145 days	The government headed by former chief minister M. Karunanidhi was dismissed by former prime minister Chandra Shekhar on charges of supporting anti-national activities, in spite of the governor Surjit Singh Barnala's report and enjoying majority in the legislative assembly.
Travancore-Cochin	1	23 March 1956	5 April 1957	1 year, 13 days	Loss of majority following split in Congress Party.
Tripura	1	1 November 1971	20 March 1972	140 days	In the backdrop of refugee influx due to Bangladesh Liberation War, split in the Congress and Communist agitation for Tripura to become a full-fledged state, president's rule was imposed. On 1 January 1972 Tripura became a State and assembly elections held subsequently.
Tripura	2	5 November 1977	4 January 1978	60 days	Collapse of short lived government in a fluid political environment.
Tripura	3	11 March 1993	10 April 1993	30 days	Elections postponed from 15 February 1993 to 3 April 1993 on account of deteriorating law and order situation. Caretaker CM resigns.
Uttar Pradesh	1	25 February 1968	26 February 1969	1 year, 1 day	Loss of majority following withdrawal of support by Congress (R) led by Indira Gandhi.
Uttar Pradesh	2	1 October 1970	18 October 1970	17 days	Charan Singh Ministry supported by Congress collapsed following split in Congress party.
Uttar Pradesh	3	13 June 1973	8 November 1973	148 days	Chief Minister resigned as a result of the 1973 Provincial Armed Constabulary revolt.
Uttar Pradesh	4	30 November 1975	21 January 1976	52 days	Congress Government of H N Bahuguna tendered resignation due to infighting within the party.
Uttar Pradesh	5	30 April 1977	23 June 1977	54 days	Government dismissed in spite of N D Tiwari enjoying majority support in Assembly.
Uttar Pradesh	6	17 February 1980	9 June 1980	113 days	Government dismissed in spite of Banarasi Das enjoying majority support in Assembly.
Uttar Pradesh	7	6 December 1992	4 December 1993	363 days	Government dismissed in the aftermath of the destruction of Babri Masjid-Ram Janmasthan.
Uttar Pradesh	8	18 October 1995	21 March 1997	1 year, 154 days	Loss of majority following collapse of coalition followed by indecisive outcome of fresh elections.
Uttar Pradesh	9	8 March 2002	3 May 2002	56 days	Indecisive outcome of elections.
Uttarakhand	1	27 March 2016	21 April 2016	25 days	Collapse of CM Harish Rawat's ministry following a split in the state unit of Congress party. In the hearing of related case, Uttarakhand High Court declared the president's rule imposition by the President unconstitutional and restored the Harish Rawat's led government in the state.
Uttarakhand	2	22 April 2016	11 May 2016	19 days	Supreme Court of India held the stay on Uttarakhand High Court's verdict thus reinstating the president's rule in the state.
West Bengal	1	20 February 1968	24 February 1969	1 year, 4 days	State placed under president's rule following collapse of two successive short lived coalition governments.
West Bengal	2	31 July 1970	1 April 1971	244 days	Collapse of United Front Coalition between Bangla Congress and CPI(M).
West Bengal	3	26 June 1971	19 March 1972	267 days	Collapse of Democratic Coalition following split in Bangla Congress.
West Bengal	4	1 May 1977	20 June 1977	50 days	Government dismissed in spite of Siddhartha Shankar Ray enjoying majority support in Assembly.

== See also ==
- Direct rule
- Federal intervention (A similar procedure used in Argentina)
- Federalism in India
- Part Eighteen of the Constitution of India
- List of state governments dismissed by the Indian National Congress
