= Doddaballapur Assembly constituency =

Legislative Assembly constituency in Karnataka, India

Coordinates: 13.29°N 77.53°E

Doddaballapur
- Constituency No. 180 for the Karnataka Legislative Assembly
- Map of Assembly constituency

Constituency details
- Country: India
- Region: South India
- State: Karnataka
- District: Bangalore Rural
- Lok Sabha constituency: Chikkaballapur
- Established: 1951
- Total electors: 214,240 (2023)
- Reservation: None

Member of Legislative Assembly
- 16th Karnataka Legislative Assembly
- Incumbent Dheeraj Muniraju
- Party: Bharatiya Janata Party
- Elected year: 2023
- Preceded by: T. Venkataramanaiah

Doddaballapur Assembly constituency is one of the 224 constituencies in the Karnataka Legislative Assembly of Karnataka, a state of India. It is also part of Chikballapur Lok Sabha constituency and was formerly in Mysore State.

== Members of the Legislative Assembly ==
Election	Member	Party
1952	Totappa Siddalingiah	Indian National Congress
1957	Totappa Siddalingiah	Indian National Congress
1962	G. Rame Gowda	Independent politician
1967	G. Rame Gowda	Independent politician
1972	G. Rame Gowda	Indian National Congress
1978	G. Rame Gowda	Indian National Congress
1983	R. L. Jalappa	Janata Party
1985	R. L. Jalappa	Janata Party
1989	R. L. Jalappa	Janata Dal
1994	R. L. Jalappa	Janata Dal
1996 By-election	R. G. Venkatachalaiah	Janata Dal
1999	V. Krishnappa	Bharatiya Janata Party
2004	J. Narasimha Swamy	Indian National Congress
2008	J. Narasimha Swamy	Indian National Congress
2013	T. Venkataramanaiah	Indian National Congress
2018	T. Venkataramanaiah	Indian National Congress
2023	Dheeraj Muniraj	Bharatiya Janata Party

== Election results ==
=== Assembly Election 2023 ===
2023 Karnataka Legislative Assembly election : Doddaballapur
Party	Candidate	Votes	%	±%
BJP	Dheeraj Muniraj	85,144	46.69%	▲30.33
INC	T. Venkataramanaiah	53,391	29.28%	▼14.11
JD(S)	B. Munegowda	39,280	21.54%	▼15.96
AAP	Purushothama	1,356	0.74%	New
NOTA	None of the above	1,010	0.55%	▼0.05
Margin of victory		31,753	17.41%	▲11.52
Turnout		182,701	85.28%	▲2.01
Total valid votes		182,365		
Registered electors		214,240		▲5.42
BJP gain from INC		Swing	▲3.30	

=== Assembly Election 2018 ===
2018 Karnataka Legislative Assembly election : Doddaballapur
Party	Candidate	Votes	%	±%
INC	T. Venkataramanaiah	73,225	43.39%	▲15.55
JD(S)	B. Munegowda	63,280	37.50%	▲12.71
BJP	J. Narasimha Swamy	27,612	16.36%	▼7.09
Independent	Dr. K. N. Venkatesh	1,018	0.60%	New
NOTA	None of the above	1,016	0.60%	New
Margin of victory		9,945	5.89%	▲4.85
Turnout		169,224	83.27%	▲2.27
Total valid votes		168,757		
Registered electors		203,231		▲10.98
INC hold		Swing	▲15.55	

=== Assembly Election 2013 ===
2013 Karnataka Legislative Assembly election : Doddaballapur
Party	Candidate	Votes	%	±%
INC	T. Venkataramanaiah	38,877	27.84%	▼13.48
Independent	B. Munegowda	37,430	26.80%	New
JD(S)	C. Channigappa	34,628	24.79%	▼13.54
BJP	J. Narasimha Swamy	32,753	23.45%	▲8.36
KJP	V. Nagendra Prasad	1,517	1.09%	New
BSP	Purushothama	1,439	1.03%	▼0.52
CPI(M)	R. Chandra Thejaswi	984	0.70%	▼0.61
Margin of victory		1,447	1.04%	▼1.96
Turnout		148,338	81.00%	▲5.20
Total valid votes		139,664		
Registered electors		183,126		▲10.87
INC hold		Swing	▼13.48	

=== Assembly Election 2008 ===
2008 Karnataka Legislative Assembly election : Doddaballapur
Party	Candidate	Votes	%	±%
INC	J. Narasimha Swamy	51,724	41.32%	▼4.42
JD(S)	C. Channigappa	47,970	38.33%	▲2.55
BJP	M. Narayangowda	18,882	15.09%	▲2.05
BSP	Purushothama	1,946	1.55%	New
CPI(M)	R. Chandra Thejaswi	1,644	1.31%	New
Independent	N. Lakshminarayan	1,463	1.17%	New
Margin of victory		3,754	3.00%	▼6.96
Turnout		125,205	75.80%	▲6.55
Total valid votes		125,166		
Registered electors		165,178		▼12.72
INC hold		Swing	▼4.42	

=== Assembly Election 2004 ===
2004 Karnataka Legislative Assembly election : Doddaballapur
Party	Candidate	Votes	%	±%
INC	J. Narasimha Swamy	59,954	45.74%	▲3.06
JD(S)	V. Krishnappa	46,898	35.78%	New
BJP	Narayana Gowda. M	17,086	13.04%	▼42.21
JP	Venkatesh. K. N	2,738	2.09%	New
Urs Samyuktha Paksha	Muniraju. M	2,006	1.53%	New
Independent	Lakshminarayana. N	1,207	0.92%	New
Kannada Nadu Party	Basavaraju. K. C	1,173	0.89%	New
Margin of victory		13,056	9.96%	▼2.61
Turnout		131,063	69.25%	▼2.40
Total valid votes		131,062		
Registered electors		189,257		▲13.71
INC gain from BJP		Swing	▼9.51	

=== Assembly Election 1999 ===
1999 Karnataka Legislative Assembly election : Doddaballapur
Party	Candidate	Votes	%	±%
BJP	V. Krishnappa	62,096	55.25%	New
INC	R. G. Venkatachalaiah	47,966	42.68%	▲34.48
CPI	R. Chandra Thejaswi	2,324	2.07%	New
Margin of victory		14,130	12.57%	▲10.84
Turnout		119,256	71.65%	▼4.09
Total valid votes		112,386		
Rejected ballots		6,807	5.71%	▲4.49
Registered electors		166,435		▲10.80
BJP gain from JD		Swing	▲8.57	

=== Assembly By-election 1996 ===
1996 Karnataka Legislative Assembly by-election : Doddaballapur
Party	Candidate	Votes	%	±%
JD	R. G. Venkatachalaiah	52,450	46.68%	▼7.37
Independent	A. Narasimhaiah	50,501	44.94%	New
INC	C. D. Sathya Narayana Gowda	9,218	8.20%	▼25.38
Margin of victory		1,949	1.73%	▼18.74
Turnout		113,760	75.74%	▼0.96
Total valid votes		112,366		
Rejected ballots		1,389	1.22%	▼0.53
Registered electors		150,207		▲2.37
JD hold		Swing	▼7.37	

=== Assembly Election 1994 ===
1994 Karnataka Legislative Assembly election : Doddaballapur
Party	Candidate	Votes	%	±%
JD	R. L. Jalappa	59,764	54.05%	▲4.25
INC	V. Krishnappa	37,130	33.58%	▼12.57
BJP	K. M. Hanumantharayappa	8,637	7.81%	New
KRRS	T. N. Prabhudeva	3,945	3.57%	New
Margin of victory		22,634	20.47%	▲16.83
Turnout		112,541	76.70%	▲0.97
Total valid votes		110,568		
Rejected ballots		1,973	1.75%	▼2.22
Registered electors		146,730		▲10.49
JD hold		Swing	▲4.25	

=== Assembly Election 1989 ===
1989 Karnataka Legislative Assembly election : Doddaballapur
Party	Candidate	Votes	%	±%
JD	R. L. Jalappa	48,096	49.80%	New
INC	V. Krishnappa	44,577	46.15%	▲15.70
JP	J. K. Srinivasamurthy	3,037	3.14%	New
Margin of victory		3,519	3.64%	▼26.49
Turnout		100,577	75.73%	▼1.45
Total valid votes		96,584		
Rejected ballots		3,993	3.97%	▲2.73
Registered electors		132,805		▲27.13
JD gain from JP		Swing	▼10.78	

=== Assembly Election 1985 ===
1985 Karnataka Legislative Assembly election : Doddaballapur
Party	Candidate	Votes	%	±%
JP	R. L. Jalappa	48,238	60.58%	▲4.55
INC	Satchidananda	24,246	30.45%	▼6.51
BJP	K. M. Hanumantha Rayappa	5,967	7.49%	▲1.91
Independent	Rahim Baba	593	0.74%	New
Margin of victory		23,992	30.13%	▲11.06
Turnout		80,627	77.18%	▲1.97
Total valid votes		79,628		
Rejected ballots		999	1.24%	▲0.14
Registered electors		104,463		▲9.13
JP hold		Swing	▲4.55	

=== Assembly Election 1983 ===
1983 Karnataka Legislative Assembly election : Doddaballapur
Party	Candidate	Votes	%	±%
JP	R. L. Jalappa	39,896	56.03%	▲15.19
INC	Gurujappa. K. C	26,316	36.96%	▲35.60
BJP	K. M. Hanumantha Rayappa	3,970	5.58%	New
Independent	Narayanaswamy. B	653	0.92%	New
Margin of victory		13,580	19.07%	▲3.02
Turnout		71,989	75.21%	▼6.69
Total valid votes		71,200		
Rejected ballots		789	1.10%	▼0.46
Registered electors		95,721		▲11.22
JP gain from INC(I)		Swing	▼0.86	

=== Assembly Election 1978 ===
1978 Karnataka Legislative Assembly election : Doddaballapur
Party	Candidate	Votes	%	±%
INC(I)	G. Rame Gowda	39,476	56.89%	New
JP	A. Neelakantaiah	28,338	40.84%	New
INC	M. Hanumanthaiah	946	1.36%	▼73.98
Margin of victory		11,138	16.05%	▼38.29
Turnout		70,487	81.90%	▲17.96
Total valid votes		69,389		
Rejected ballots		1,098	1.56%	▲1.56
Registered electors		86,062		▲11.78
INC(I) gain from INC		Swing	▼18.45	

=== Assembly Election 1972 ===
1972 Mysore State Legislative Assembly election : Doddaballapur
Party	Candidate	Votes	%	±%
INC	G. Rame Gowda	36,196	75.34%	▲29.17
ABJS	D. Pillegowda	10,086	20.99%	▲16.61
INC(O)	N. G. R. Naidu	1,763	3.67%	New
Margin of victory		26,110	54.34%	▲51.05
Turnout		49,227	63.94%	▼12.87
Total valid votes		48,045		
Registered electors		76,993		▲20.61
INC gain from Independent		Swing	▲25.88	

=== Assembly Election 1967 ===
1967 Mysore State Legislative Assembly election : Doddaballapur
Party	Candidate	Votes	%	±%
Independent	G. Rame Gowda	23,376	49.46%	New
INC	A. Neelakantaiah	21,822	46.17%	▲22.49
ABJS	P. Gowda	2,069	4.38%	New
Margin of victory		1,554	3.29%	▼36.39
Turnout		49,031	76.81%	▲3.53
Total valid votes		47,267		
Registered electors		63,838		▲12.05
Independent hold		Swing	▼13.90	

=== Assembly Election 1962 ===
1962 Mysore State Legislative Assembly election : Doddaballapur
Party	Candidate	Votes	%	±%
Independent	G. Rame Gowda	25,288	63.36%	New
INC	A. Neelakantaiah	9,450	23.68%	▼40.87
CPI	H. Muguvalappa	3,804	9.53%	New
ABJS	D. Papanna	1,154	2.89%	New
Margin of victory		15,838	39.68%	▼2.46
Turnout		41,751	73.28%	▲20.28
Total valid votes		39,913		
Registered electors		56,972		▲11.20
Independent gain from INC		Swing	▼1.19	

=== Assembly Election 1957 ===
1957 Mysore State Legislative Assembly election : Doddaballapur
Party	Candidate	Votes	%	±%
INC	Totappa Siddalingiah	17,527	64.55%	▼5.81
ABJS	T. C. Gangadharappa	6,084	22.41%	New
Independent	A. Ramakrishnaiah	3,541	13.04%	New
Margin of victory		11,443	42.14%	▼3.43
Turnout		27,152	53.00%	▼17.59
Total valid votes		27,152		
Registered electors		51,232		▲26.40
INC hold		Swing	▼5.81	

=== Assembly Election 1952 ===
1952 Mysore State Legislative Assembly election : Doddaballapur
Party	Candidate	Votes	%	±%
INC	Totappa Siddalingiah	20,130	70.36%	New
KMPP	H. C. Subbanna	7,092	24.79%	New
Independent	A. Ramakrishnaiah	1,390	4.86%	New
Margin of victory		13,038	45.57%	
Turnout		28,612	70.59%	
Total valid votes		28,612		
Registered electors		40,531		
INC win (new seat)				

== See also ==
- Bangalore rural district
- List of constituencies of Karnataka Legislative Assembly
