= Tubagere =

Tubagere Tubugere
- Town
- Location in Karnataka, India
- Coordinates: 13.373°N 77.570°E
- Country: India
- State: Karnataka
- District: Bengaluru North
- Established: 08/09/1345
- Founder: Doddakondappa

Government
  - Body: Nanu
- Elevation: 881 m (2,890 ft)

Population (2023)
  - Total: 26,789

Languages
  - Official: Kannada, Telugu, Urdu, Hindi
- Time zone: UTC+5:30 (IST)
- PIN: 561 203
- Telephone code: 08119
- Vehicle registration: KA-43
- Website: www.tubagere.in

Tubagere or Tubagere pete is a Town and Grama Panchayat in Bengaluru North district in Karnataka, India. Primary language spoken is Kannada. Population of 2,485 as of 2011.

Tubgere is a major agricultural hub near Doddaballapur. It is seen as a model town center's rural Bio-Resources Complex Project. The aim of the project is to increase the income of farmers by four times in five years starting from 1 April 2005, through reduction of the cost of cultivation and crop diversification.

The Bio-Resources Complex Project, launched on a pilot basis by the National Bio-Resources Development Board of the Union Government, has benefited numerous farming families across 51 villages in Tubagere Hobli, Doddaballpur taluk.

== Government offices ==
1. Grama Panchayat office, Tubagere
2. Assistant Engineer (Panchayat Raj) office, Tubagere Hobali
3. Assistant Engineer (BESCOM) office, Tubagere Section
4. Raitha Samparka Kendra (Agriculture), Tubagere Hobali
5. Upa-Tahsildar (Revenue) office, Tubagere Hobali
6. Registrar (Birth & Death) Office, Tubagere Circle
7. Government Veterinary Hospital, Tubagere
8. Pri-Metric Hostel, Tubagere
9. Primary Health Center, Tubagere
10. Post Office, Tubagere (561204)
11. Union Bank of India, Tubagere
12. Milk dairy
13. Agriculral Co-operative society
14. Ration depo

== School and colleges ==
1. Government Middle school
2. Government High School, Tubagere
3. Government PU College, Tubagere
4. S L R S TUBAGERE, Private School

== Bank ==
1. Union Bank of India, Tubagere
2. Indian overseas bank ATM

== Tourist places ==
- Makali Durga Hills
- Sri Raghavendra Swamy Matha: Lakkasandra.
- Prasanna Lakshmi Venkateshwara Swamy Temple: Tubagere
- Sri Subramanya Ghati Temple
- Benakana Hala
- Sappalamma gudi Pettammanahalli
- Iscon Goshala
- Rashtrotthana Goshala (Ghati subramanaya)
- Sotenahalli forest (kallaragutta nickname)
- Tubagere Lake
- Devarabetta sri vishwa shaneshwara temple
- Nandi hills
- etc.
