= Arabhavi =

Village in Karnataka, India

- Village
- Location in Karnataka, India Arabhavi (India)
- Coordinates: 16.14°N 74.81°E
- Country: India
- State: Karnataka
- District: Belgaum
- Talukas: Mudalagi

Population (2001)
  - Total: 9,179

Languages
  - Official: Kannada
- Time zone: UTC+5:30 (IST)

Arabhavi is a village in the southern state of Karnataka, India. It is located in the Mudalagi taluk of Belagavi district. It is the location of a college of horticulture that is attached to University of Horticulture Sciences, Bagalkot.

== Demographics ==
As of 2014 India census, Arabhavi has a population of 9179 with 4515 males and 4664 females. It is situated nearby Gokak taluk.

== See also ==
- Belgaum
- Districts of Karnataka
