= Arabhavi Assembly constituency =

Constituency of the Karnataka legislative assembly in India

Coordinates: 16.22°N 74.82°E

Arabhavi
- Constituency No. 8 for the Karnataka Legislative Assembly

Constituency details
- Country: India
- Region: South India
- State: Karnataka
- District: Belgaum
- Lok Sabha constituency: Belgaum
- Established: 1967
- Total electors: 248,632
- Reservation: None

Member of Legislative Assembly
- 16th Karnataka Legislative Assembly
- Incumbent Balachandra Jarkiholi
- Party: Bharatiya Janata Party
- Elected year: 2018

Arabhavi Assembly constituency is one of the 224 constituencies in the Karnataka Legislative Assembly of Karnataka, a southern state of India. It is a segment of Belagavi Lok Sabha constituency. It is in Belgaum district.

== Members of the Legislative Assembly ==
| Year | Member | Party |
|---|---|---|
| 1967 | A. R. Panchaganvi | Indian National Congress |
| 1972 | Koujalgi Veeranna Shivalingappa | Indian National Congress |
| 1978 | Koujalgi Veeranna Shivalingappa | Indian National Congress |
| 1983 | Koujalgi Veeranna Shivalingappa | Indian National Congress |
| 1985 | R. M. Patil | Janata Party |
| 1989 | Koujalgi Veeranna Shivalingappa | Indian National Congress |
| 1994 | Koujalgi Veeranna Shivalingappa | Indian National Congress |
| 1999 | Koujalgi Veeranna Shivalingappa | Indian National Congress |
| 2004 | Balachandra Jarkiholi | Janata Dal (Secular) |
| 2008 | Balachandra Jarkiholi | Janata Dal (Secular) |
| 2008^ (Note: Resigned on 05/07/2008 due to which by-election was held.) | Balachandra Jarkiholi | Janata Dal (Secular) |
| 2013 | Balachandra Jarkiholi | Bharatiya Janata Party |
| 2018 | Balachandra Jarkiholi | Bharatiya Janata Party |
| 2023 | Balachandra Jarkiholi | Bharatiya Janata Party |

== Election results ==
=== Assembly Election 2023 ===
2023 Karnataka Legislative Assembly election : Arabhavi
| Party | Candidate | Votes | % | ±% |
|---|---|---|---|---|
| BJP | Balachandra Jarkiholi | 115,402 | 60.70% | ▲6.36 |
| Independent | Bhimappa Gundappa Gadad | 43,862 | 23.07% | |
| INC | Arvind Mahadevarao Dalwai | 23,956 | 12.60% | New |
| JD(S) | Prakash Ramappa Kalashetti | 1,217 | 0.64% | New |
| NOTA | None of the above | 930 | 0.49% | ▼0.30 |
| Margin of victory | | 71,540 | 37.63% | ▲10.88 |
| Turnout | | 191,530 | 77.03% | ▲0.67 |
| Total valid votes | | 190,105 | | |
| Registered electors | | 248,632 | | ▲7.23 |
| BJP hold | | Swing | ▲6.36 | |

=== Assembly Election 2018 ===
2018 Karnataka Legislative Assembly election : Arabhavi
| Party | Candidate | Votes | % | ±% |
|---|---|---|---|---|
| BJP | Balachandra Jarkiholi | 96,144 | 54.34% | ▼14.08 |
| JD(S) | Bhimappa Gundappa Gadad | 48,816 | 27.59% | New |
| INC | Arvind Mahadevrao Dalwai | 23,253 | 13.14% | New |
| Independent | Chunappa Uddappa Pujeri | 2,962 | 1.67% | New |
| Sarva Janata Party | Ashok Pandappa Hanaji | 1,745 | 0.99% | New |
| Independent | Bhimappa Siddappa Naik | 1,161 | 0.66% | New |
| NOTA | None of the above | 1,398 | 0.79% | New |
| Margin of victory | | 47,328 | 26.75% | ▼25.09 |
| Turnout | | 177,045 | 76.36% | ▲2.49 |
| Total valid votes | | 176,936 | | |
| Registered electors | | 231,864 | | ▲18.02 |
| BJP hold | | Swing | ▼14.08 | |

=== Assembly Election 2013 ===
2013 Karnataka Legislative Assembly election : Arabhavi
| Party | Candidate | Votes | % | ±% |
|---|---|---|---|---|
| BJP | Balachandra Jarkiholi | 99,283 | 68.42% | ▲26.61 |
| INC | Utagi Ramappa Kareppa | 24,062 | 16.58% | New |
| KJP | Latur Suresh Mahalingappa | 11,445 | 7.89% | New |
| JD(S) | Gurappa Kallappa Hittanagi | 3,081 | 2.12% | New |
| Independent | Guruputra Kempanna Kullur | 2,012 | 1.39% | New |
| SKP | Goudar Shivanagouda Ningappa | 1,527 | 1.05% | ▼0.10 |
| Independent | Mahantappa Sabanna Goudar | 1,388 | 0.96% | New |
| BSP | Basavanth Irappa Vader | 910 | 0.63% | New |
| Margin of victory | | 75,221 | 51.84% | ▲47.62 |
| Turnout | | 145,121 | 73.87% | ▼0.25 |
| Total valid votes | | 145,099 | | |
| Registered electors | | 196,454 | | ▲14.39 |
| BJP gain from JD(S) | | Swing | ▲26.61 | |

=== Assembly By-election 2008 ===
2008 Karnataka Legislative Assembly by-election : Arabhavi
| Party | Candidate | Votes | % | ±% |
|---|---|---|---|---|
| JD(S) | Balachandra Jarkiholi | | | |
| JD(S) hold | | Swing | | |

=== Assembly Election 2008 ===
2008 Karnataka Legislative Assembly election : Arabhavi
| Party | Candidate | Votes | % | ±% |
|---|---|---|---|---|
| JD(S) | Balachandra Jarkiholi | 53,206 | 41.81% | ▼5.25 |
| BJP | Vivekrao Vasantrao Patil | 47,838 | 37.59% | New |
| INC | Koujalgi Veeranna Shivalingappa | 17,106 | 13.44% | ▼18.87 |
| BSP | Suresh Mahalingappa Lathur | 3,735 | 2.94% | ▼13.26 |
| Independent | Ashok Pandappa Hanaji | 2,944 | 2.31% | New |
| SKP | Goudar Shivanagouda Ningappa | 1,469 | 1.15% | New |
| SP | Undri Gopal Bharamappa | 954 | 0.75% | New |
| Margin of victory | | 5,368 | 4.22% | ▼10.53 |
| Turnout | | 127,292 | 74.12% | ▲3.68 |
| Total valid votes | | 127,252 | | |
| Registered electors | | 171,744 | | ▼8.34 |
| JD(S) hold | | Swing | ▼5.25 | |

=== Assembly Election 2004 ===
2004 Karnataka Legislative Assembly election : Arabhavi
| Party | Candidate | Votes | % | ±% |
|---|---|---|---|---|
| JD(S) | Balachandra Jarkiholi | 62,054 | 47.06% | New |
| INC | Koujalgi Veeranna Shivalingappa | 42,604 | 32.31% | ▼15.21 |
| BJP | Suresh Mahalingappa Lathur | 21,362 | 16.20% | New |
| JP | Mathapathi Mahantesh Irayya | 2,183 | 1.66% | New |
| Independent | Khanagoodar Shivagoudappa Balappa | 1,607 | 1.22% | New |
| Kannada Nadu Party | Kittur Ramappa Veerappa | 1,074 | 0.81% | New |
| Uttarakhand Sanskriti Parishad | Metagudda Jayadeva Nijalingappa | 975 | 0.74% | New |
| Margin of victory | | 19,450 | 14.75% | ▼2.22 |
| Turnout | | 131,978 | 70.44% | ▲3.69 |
| Total valid votes | | 131,859 | | |
| Registered electors | | 187,369 | | ▲9.63 |
| JD(S) gain from INC | | Swing | ▼0.46 | |

=== Assembly Election 1999 ===
1999 Karnataka Legislative Assembly election : Arabhavi
| Party | Candidate | Votes | % | ±% |
|---|---|---|---|---|
| INC | Koujalgi Veeranna Shivalingappa | 51,094 | 47.52% | ▼1.11 |
| BJP | Tammanna Siddappa Parsi | 32,844 | 30.54% | New |
| Independent | Prathibha Patil | 9,957 | 9.26% | New |
| JD(S) | Handigund Bhimappa Balappa | 8,940 | 8.31% | New |
| Independent | Latur Suresh Mahalingappa | 4,695 | 4.37% | New |
| Margin of victory | | 18,250 | 16.97% | ▼0.41 |
| Turnout | | 114,076 | 66.75% | ▼4.06 |
| Total valid votes | | 107,530 | | |
| Registered electors | | 170,908 | | ▲12.46 |
| INC hold | | Swing | ▼1.11 | |

=== Assembly Election 1994 ===
1994 Karnataka Legislative Assembly election : Arabhavi
| Party | Candidate | Votes | % | ±% |
|---|---|---|---|---|
| INC | Koujalgi Veeranna Shivalingappa | 50,866 | 48.63% | ▲14.29 |
| JD | Patil Pratibha Vasantarao | 32,686 | 31.25% | New |
| Karnataka Rajya Ryota Sangha | Sonawalkar Krishnappa Hanamantappa | 9,236 | 8.83% | New |
| INC | Jekabal Shivaputra Donkappa | 4,893 | 4.68% | New |
| BJP | Kadari Irappa Bhimappa | 4,806 | 4.59% | New |
| Independent | Madennavar Shidaram Kenchappa | 673 | 0.64% | New |
| Margin of victory | | 18,180 | 17.38% | ▲10.05 |
| Turnout | | 107,614 | 70.81% | ▲3.97 |
| Total valid votes | | 104,608 | | |
| Registered electors | | 151,978 | | ▲4.93 |
| INC hold | | Swing | ▲14.29 | |

=== Assembly Election 1989 ===
1989 Karnataka Legislative Assembly election : Arabhavi
| Party | Candidate | Votes | % | ±% |
|---|---|---|---|---|
| INC | Koujalgi Veeranna Shivalingappa | 31,009 | 34.34% | ▲4.27 |
| Kranti Sabha | Parsi Tammanna Siddappa | 24,389 | 27.01% | New |
| Independent | Prathibha Patil | 16,976 | 18.80% | New |
| JD | R. M. Patil | 12,356 | 13.68% | ▼25.50 |
| JP | Gotadki Shidlingappa Balappa | 2,334 | 2.58% | New |
| BJP | Basavaraj Dundappa Huddar | 1,018 | 1.13% | New |
| Independent | Imamsab Appala Kalloli | 717 | 0.79% | New |
| Independent | Tukaram Kallappa Bagai | 658 | 0.73% | New |
| Margin of victory | | 6,620 | 7.33% | ▼1.78 |
| Turnout | | 96,810 | 66.84% | ▲1.66 |
| Total valid votes | | 90,304 | | |
| Registered electors | | 144,844 | | ▲31.48 |
| INC gain from JP | | Swing | ▼4.84 | |

=== Assembly Election 1985 ===
1985 Karnataka Legislative Assembly election : Arabhavi
| Party | Candidate | Votes | % | ±% |
|---|---|---|---|---|
| JP | R. M. Patil | 27,503 | 39.18% | New |
| Independent | Koujalgi Veeranna Shivalingappa | 21,108 | 30.07% | |
| INC | P. J. Mangalekar | 17,042 | 24.28% | New |
| LKD | Chavali Bhimappa Yallappa | 3,261 | 4.65% | New |
| Margin of victory | | 6,395 | 9.11% | ▼32.56 |
| Turnout | | 71,811 | 65.18% | ▲3.04 |
| Total valid votes | | 70,192 | | |
| Registered electors | | 110,167 | | ▲15.36 |
| JP gain from INC | | Swing | ▼18.43 | |

=== Assembly Election 1983 ===
1983 Karnataka Legislative Assembly election : Arabhavi
| Party | Candidate | Votes | % | ±% |
|---|---|---|---|---|
| INC | Koujalgi Veeranna Shivalingappa | 32,974 | 57.61% | ▲2.20 |
| JP | Gotadki Shidlingappa Balappa | 9,125 | 15.94% | New |
| Independent | Naik Maruti Vasudev | 7,791 | 13.61% | New |
| Independent | Biraj Maruti Rangappa | 2,606 | 4.55% | New |
| BJP | Huddar Basavara Dundappa | 2,140 | 3.74% | New |
| Independent | Kambali Vittappa Giddaalakkappa | 631 | 1.10% | New |
| Independent | Belakud Irappa Ramappa | 504 | 0.88% | New |
| Margin of victory | | 23,849 | 41.67% | ▲10.85 |
| Turnout | | 59,341 | 62.14% | ▼8.20 |
| Total valid votes | | 57,234 | | |
| Registered electors | | 95,497 | | ▲13.44 |
| INC gain from INC(I) | | Swing | ▲2.20 | |

=== Assembly Election 1978 ===
1978 Karnataka Legislative Assembly election : Arabhavi
| Party | Candidate | Votes | % | ±% |
|---|---|---|---|---|
| INC(I) | Koujalgi Veeranna Shivalingappa | 31,462 | 55.41% | ▼6.44 |
| INC | Patil Vasantrao Lakhagouda | 13,964 | 24.59% | New |
| JP | Pujeri Ningayya Sangayya | 10,213 | 17.99% | ▼7.88 |
| Independent | Hosamath Panchaxari Shivabasayya | 766 | 1.35% | New |
| Independent | Sunadholi Pralhad Madwacharya | 372 | 0.66% | New |
| Margin of victory | | 17,498 | 30.82% | ▼5.17 |
| Turnout | | 59,213 | 70.34% | ▲18.37 |
| Total valid votes | | 56,777 | | |
| Rejected ballots | | 2,436 | 4.11% | ▲4.11 |
| Registered electors | | 84,183 | | ▲21.50 |
| INC(I) gain from INC | | Swing | ▼6.44 | |

=== Assembly Election 1972 ===
1972 Mysore State Legislative Assembly election : Arabhavi
| Party | Candidate | Votes | % | ±% |
|---|---|---|---|---|
| INC | Koujalgi Veeranna Shivalingappa | 21,362 | 61.85% | New |
| INC(O) | Pujeri Ningayya Sangayya | 8,934 | 25.87% | New |
| Independent | A. Yemanapa Siddappa | 2,360 | 6.83% | |
| ABJS | S. M. Bodhachary | 1,026 | 2.97% | New |
| Independent | Chimappa Yellappa | 854 | 2.47% | New |
| Margin of victory | | 12,428 | 35.99% | ▼7.90 |
| Turnout | | 36,009 | 51.97% | ▼2.48 |
| Total valid votes | | 34,536 | | |
| Registered electors | | 69,285 | | ▲15.70 |
| INC hold | | Swing | ▼1.49 | |

=== Assembly Election 1967 ===
1967 Mysore State Legislative Assembly election : Arabhavi
| Party | Candidate | Votes | % | ±% |
|---|---|---|---|---|
| INC | A. R. Panchaganvi | 18,584 | 63.34% | New |
| Independent | A. Yemanapa Siddappa | 5,708 | 19.46% | New |
| ABJS | A. A. Gurlingappa | 5,047 | 17.20% | New |
| Margin of victory | | 12,876 | 43.89% | |
| Turnout | | 32,608 | 54.45% | |
| Total valid votes | | 29,339 | | |
| Registered electors | | 59,882 | | |
| INC gain from | | | | |

== See also ==
- Arabhavi
- Belagavi district
- List of constituencies of Karnataka Legislative Assembly
