= Gokak Assembly constituency =

Legislative Assembly constituency in Karnataka state, India

Coordinates: 16.16°N 74.82°E

Gokak
- Constituency No. 9 for the Karnataka Legislative Assembly

Constituency details
- Country: India
- Region: South India
- State: Karnataka
- District: Belagavi
- Lok Sabha constituency: Belagavi
- Established: 1951
- Reservation: None

Member of Legislative Assembly
- 16th Karnataka Legislative Assembly
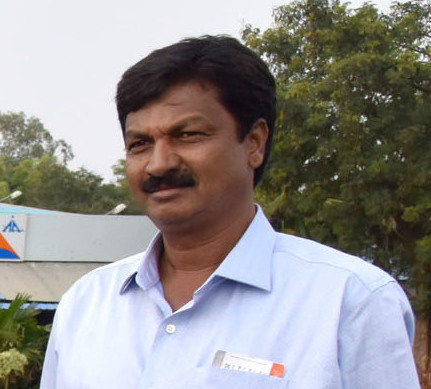
- Incumbent Ramesh Jarkiholi
- Party: Bharatiya Janata Party
- Elected year: 2019

Gokak Assembly constituency is one of the 224 seats in Karnataka State Assembly in India. It is part of Belagavi Lok Sabha constituency.

== Members of the Legislative Assembly ==
Election	Member	Party
1952	Panchagavi Appana Ramappa	Indian National Congress
1967	L. S. Naik	Indian National Congress
1972	G. C. Tammanna	Indian National Congress
1978	Nail Laxman Siddappa	Indian National Congress
1983	Muttennavar Mallappa Laxman	Janata Party
1985	Muttennavar Mallappa Laxman	Janata Party
1989	Shankar Hanmant Karning	Indian National Congress
1994	Naik Chandrashekhar Sadashiva	Janata Dal
1999	Ramesh Jarkiholi	Indian National Congress
2004	Ramesh Jarkiholi	Indian National Congress
2008	Ramesh Jarkiholi	Indian National Congress
2013	Ramesh Jarkiholi	Indian National Congress
2018	Ramesh Jarkiholi	Indian National Congress
2019 By-election (Note: Disqualified by the Hon'ble Speaker under the 10th Schedule of the Constitution with effect from 25/07/2019)	Ramesh Jarkiholi	Bharatiya Janata Party
2023	Ramesh Jarkiholi	Bharatiya Janata Party

== Election results ==
=== Assembly Election 2023 ===
2023 Karnataka Legislative Assembly election : Gokak
Party	Candidate	Votes	%	±%
BJP	Ramesh Jarkiholi	105,313	55.31%	▲6.02
INC	Kadadi Mahantesh Kallappa	79,901	41.97%	▲9.03
NOTA	None of the above	1,060	0.56%	▼0.09
Margin of victory		25,412	13.35%	▼3.00
Turnout		190,580	74.31%	▲1.80
Total valid votes		190,390		
Registered electors		256,471		▲4.24
BJP hold		Swing	▲6.02	

=== Assembly By-election 2019 ===
2019 Karnataka Legislative Assembly by-election : Gokak
Party	Candidate	Votes	%	±%
BJP	Ramesh Jarkiholi	87,450	49.29%	▲5.62
INC	Lakhan Laxmanarao Jarakiholi	58,444	32.94%	▼18.93
JD(S)	Ashok Ningayyaswami Pujari	27,948	15.75%	▲14.86
Independent	Sanjay Irappa Kurbett	1,420	0.80%	New
NOTA	None of the above	1,153	0.65%	▼0.57
Margin of victory		29,006	16.35%	▲8.14
Turnout		178,408	72.51%	▲0.66
Total valid votes		177,409		
Registered electors		246,034		▲1.50
BJP gain from INC		Swing	▼2.58	

=== Assembly Election 2018 ===
2018 Karnataka Legislative Assembly election : Gokak
Party	Candidate	Votes	%	±%
INC	Ramesh Jarkiholi	90,249	51.87%	▼2.99
BJP	Ashok Ningayyaswami Pujari	75,969	43.67%	▲40.70
NOTA	None of the above	2,121	1.22%	New
JD(S)	Kareppa Lakkappa Talawar	1,553	0.89%	▼34.56
AIMEP	Paravin Jabbar Tambule	1,477	0.85%	New
Margin of victory		14,280	8.21%	▼11.19
Turnout		174,167	71.85%	▲0.09
Total valid votes		173,980		
Registered electors		242,402		▲19.78
INC hold		Swing	▼2.99	

=== Assembly Election 2013 ===
2013 Karnataka Legislative Assembly election : Gokak
Party	Candidate	Votes	%	±%
INC	Ramesh Jarkiholi	79,175	54.86%	▲18.76
JD(S)	Ashok Ningayyaswami Pujari	51,170	35.45%	▲5.58
KJP	Umesh Adiveppa Nirwani	4,366	3.03%	New
BJP	Vasudev Mahadevappa Savatikai	4,293	2.97%	▼25.08
Independent	Halappa Kallappa Vanagol	2,047	1.42%	New
Independent	Bhimashi Jarkiholi	1,831	1.27%	New
Margin of victory		28,005	19.40%	▲13.17
Turnout		145,224	71.76%	▲2.60
Total valid votes		144,327		
Registered electors		202,371		▲12.18
INC hold		Swing	▲18.76	

=== Assembly Election 2008 ===
2008 Karnataka Legislative Assembly election : Gokak
Party	Candidate	Votes	%	±%
INC	Ramesh Jarkiholi	44,989	36.10%	▼19.09
JD(S)	Ashok Ningayyaswami Pujari	37,229	29.87%	▲27.27
BJP	Bhimashi Laxmanrao Jarkiholi	34,958	28.05%	▼11.42
Independent	Shrikant Adiveppa Modagi	2,734	2.19%	New
BSP	Dastagirsab Mugudsab Pailwan	1,893	1.52%	New
SP	M. M. Khaji	1,240	1.00%	New
JD(U)	Hatti Shivanand Murigeppa	973	0.78%	New
Margin of victory		7,760	6.23%	▼9.50
Turnout		124,773	69.16%	▲1.35
Total valid votes		124,623		
Registered electors		180,404		▲18.85
INC hold		Swing	▼19.09	

=== Assembly Election 2004 ===
2004 Karnataka Legislative Assembly election : Gokak
Party	Candidate	Votes	%	±%
INC	Ramesh Jarkiholi	56,768	55.19%	▼17.41
BJP	Muttennavar Mallappa Laxman	40,593	39.47%	▲28.41
JP	Guddakayu Shankar Tammanna	2,817	2.74%	New
JD(S)	Patil Basavaraj Rajgouda	2,678	2.60%	New
Margin of victory		16,175	15.73%	▼41.00
Turnout		102,923	67.81%	▼2.96
Total valid votes		102,856		
Registered electors		151,789		▲2.57
INC hold		Swing	▼17.41	

=== Assembly Election 1999 ===
1999 Karnataka Legislative Assembly election : Gokak
Party	Candidate	Votes	%	±%
INC	Ramesh Jarkiholi	72,888	72.60%	▲43.45
JD(U)	Naik Chandrashekhar Sadashiva	15,932	15.87%	New
BJP	Muttennavar Mallappa Laxman	11,099	11.06%	▼3.34
Margin of victory		56,956	56.73%	▲41.24
Turnout		104,725	70.77%	▲2.88
Total valid votes		100,395		
Rejected ballots		4,298	4.10%	▲1.45
Registered electors		147,988		▲15.20
INC gain from JD		Swing	▲27.96	

=== Assembly Election 1994 ===
1994 Karnataka Legislative Assembly election : Gokak
Party	Candidate	Votes	%	±%
JD	Naik Chandrashekhar Sadashiva	37,891	44.64%	▲15.49
INC	Shankar Hanmant Karning	24,741	29.15%	▼19.31
BJP	Choti Siddappa Mallappa	12,227	14.40%	New
KRRS	Ashok Bhimarayappa Patil	5,881	6.93%	New
INC	Yallappa Bhimappa Naik	3,949	4.65%	New
Margin of victory		13,150	15.49%	▼3.83
Turnout		87,208	67.89%	▲0.57
Total valid votes		84,887		
Rejected ballots		2,312	2.65%	▼2.27
Registered electors		128,464		▲5.47
JD gain from INC		Swing	▼3.82	

=== Assembly Election 1989 ===
1989 Karnataka Legislative Assembly election : Gokak
Party	Candidate	Votes	%	±%
INC	Shankar Hanmant Karning	37,781	48.46%	▲3.00
JD	Muttennavar Mallappa Laxman	22,723	29.15%	New
Kranti Sabha	Vadanaik Satteppa Gutteppa	12,772	16.38%	New
JP	Nayak Nayakanna Appanna	2,490	3.19%	New
Independent	Bhimgouda Malagouda Patil	1,922	2.47%	New
Margin of victory		15,058	19.32%	▲12.75
Turnout		81,991	67.32%	▼1.21
Total valid votes		77,960		
Rejected ballots		4,031	4.92%	▲3.33
Registered electors		121,801		▲26.44
INC gain from JP		Swing	▼3.58	

=== Assembly Election 1985 ===
1985 Karnataka Legislative Assembly election : Gokak
Party	Candidate	Votes	%	±%
JP	Muttennavar Mallappa Laxman	33,806	52.04%	▲2.32
INC	Jarkiholi Ramappa Laxman	29,537	45.46%	▲1.43
BJP	C. Rudrappa	583	0.90%	▼3.04
Independent	Nayak Chintrappa Hanamatappa	450	0.69%	New
Margin of victory		4,269	6.57%	▲0.88
Turnout		66,014	68.53%	▲4.54
Total valid votes		64,967		
Rejected ballots		1,047	1.59%	▼1.47
Registered electors		96,334		▲13.14
JP hold		Swing	▲2.32	

=== Assembly Election 1983 ===
1983 Karnataka Legislative Assembly election : Gokak
Party	Candidate	Votes	%	±%
JP	Muttennavar Mallappa Laxman	26,258	49.72%	▲22.34
INC	Laxman Shiddappa Naik	23,253	44.03%	▲33.01
BJP	C. Rudrappa	2,082	3.94%	New
Independent	Kattimani Chandappa Jampanna	1,025	1.94%	New
Margin of victory		3,005	5.69%	▼28.52
Turnout		54,484	63.99%	▼2.52
Total valid votes		52,815		
Rejected ballots		1,669	3.06%	▲0.17
Registered electors		85,143		▲7.72
JP gain from INC(I)		Swing	▼11.88	

=== Assembly Election 1978 ===
1978 Karnataka Legislative Assembly election : Gokak
Party	Candidate	Votes	%	±%
INC(I)	Nail Laxman Siddappa	31,447	61.60%	New
JP	Kattimani Chandappa Jampanna	13,980	27.38%	New
INC	Guddakayu Chandrasekhar Tamanna	5,625	11.02%	▼55.24
Margin of victory		17,467	34.21%	▼5.68
Turnout		52,574	66.51%	▲1.24
Total valid votes		51,052		
Rejected ballots		1,522	2.89%	▲2.89
Registered electors		79,043		▲18.69
INC(I) gain from INC		Swing	▼4.66	

=== Assembly Election 1972 ===
1972 Mysore State Legislative Assembly election : Gokak
Party	Candidate	Votes	%	±%
INC	G. C. Tammanna	28,005	66.26%	▲10.24
INC(O)	B. M. Patil	11,144	26.37%	New
ABJS	A. V. Basavanneppa	1,647	3.90%	New
Independent	Laxman Shiddappa Naik	1,472	3.48%	New
Margin of victory		16,861	39.89%	▲6.71
Turnout		43,471	65.27%	▲6.32
Total valid votes		42,268		
Registered electors		66,597		▲14.36
INC hold		Swing	▲10.24	

=== Assembly Election 1967 ===
1967 Mysore State Legislative Assembly election : Gokak
Party	Candidate	Votes	%	±%
INC	L. S. Naik	17,522	56.02%	▼15.15
Independent	P. H. Karaning	7,144	22.84%	New
Independent	P. S. Mallgoud	5,990	19.15%	New
Independent	K. C. Jampanna	620	1.98%	New
Margin of victory		10,378	33.18%	▼9.15
Turnout		34,330	58.95%	▲2.41
Total valid votes		31,276		
Registered electors		58,236		▲5.01
INC hold		Swing	▼15.15	

=== Assembly Election 1952 ===
1952 Bombay State Legislative Assembly election : Gokak
Party	Candidate	Votes	%	±%
INC	Panchagavi Appana Ramappa	22,316	71.17%	New
KMPP	Mamdapur Basawantappa Balappa	9,042	28.83%	New
Margin of victory		13,274	42.33%	
Turnout		31,358	56.54%	
Total valid votes		31,358		
Registered electors		55,460		
INC win (new seat)				

== See also ==
- Belagavi District
- List of constituencies of Karnataka Legislative Assembly
