= L. S. Naik =

Indian politician (1967–1971)

L. S. Naik was a Member of the legislative assembly (1967–1971) from Gokak constituency to the Karnataka state, Bangalore. Then Veerendra Patil was the Chief Minister of the Karnataka state.
