= Dheeraj Muniraj =

Indian politician (born 1992)

Dheeraj Muniraj (born 8 January 1992) is an Indian politician from Karnataka. He is an MLA from Doddaballapur Assembly constituency in Bangalore Rural district. He won the 2023 Karnataka Legislative Assembly election representing Bharatiya Janata Party.

== Early life and education ==
Muniraj is from Doddaballapur, Bangalure Rural district. His father is P. Muniraj. He did his schooling at Clarence High School, Bengaluru. He completed his Bachelor of Engineering in Electronics and Communications in 2014 at R V College of Engineering, Bengaluru and his Master of Science in engineering in 2016 at Texas A&M University, College of Station, Texas, USA.

== Career ==
Muniraj won from Doddaballpur Assembly constituency representing Bharatiya Janata Party in the 2023 Karnataka Legislative Assembly election. He polled 85,144 votes and defeated his nearest rival, T. Venkatesh of Indian National Congress by a margin of 31,753 votes.
