= List of state governments dismissed by the Indian National Congress =

This is the list of state governments of India dismissed by the Indian National Congress between 1952 and present.

== List ==
S.No	Year	Assembly	CM before	Party	CM after	Party	Reason(s) for dismissal of State Government	References
1.	1953	Patiala and East Punjab States Union	Gian Singh Rarewala	Independent	President's rule		Suspended the Government using Article 356	
2.	1959	Kerala	E. M. S. Namboodiripad	Communist Party of India	President's rule		The immediate effect of the Vimochana Samaram was the controversial dismissal of government on 31 July 1959 and imposition of President's rule.	
3.	2 December 1966	Goa, Daman and Diu	Dayanand Bandodkar	Maharashtrawadi Gomantak Party	President's rule		Government was dismissed in order to ensure that the referendum poll was ‘free and fair’, and conceding to the demands of the UGP	
4.	2 November 1967	Haryana	Birender Singh	Vishal Haryana Party	President's rule		Government was dismissed by the Union government after CM refused to accept the late Indira Gandhi as the arbitrator for dispute between Punjab and Haryana over river waters, Chandigarh and the Hindi-speaking areas of the state of Punjab.	
5.	11 January 1971	Odisha	Rajendra Narayan Singh Deo	Swatantra Party	President's rule		Break-up of coalition	
6.	18 March 1971	Karnataka	Veerendra Patil	Indian National Congress (O)	President's rule		Suspended The Government Using Article 356	
7.	12 May 1971	Gujarat	Hitendra Kanaiyalal Desai	Indian National Congress (O)	President's rule		Loss of majority following vertical split in Congress during 1969 presidential election	
8.	27 March 1973	Manipur	Mohammed Alimuddin	Manipur Peoples Party	President's rule		President's rule was imposed even though the opposition had a "tenuous" majority and could have formed a government	
9.	5 December 1974	Manipur	Yangmaso Shaiza	Manipur Hills Union	Raj Kumar Dorendra Singh	Indian National Congress	Incumbent Coalition MLAS Defected To Congress	
10.	1 February 1976	Tamil Nadu	M. Karunanidhi	Dravida Munnetra Kazhagam	President's rule		Government dismissed in spite of Chief minister Karunanidhi enjoying majority support in Assembly, due to the Government not strictly enforcing provisions of Emergency rules.	
11.	12 March 1976	Gujarat	Babubhai J. Patel	Indian National Congress (O)	Madhav Singh Solanki	Indian National Congress	"Non-Passage" of budget leading to collapse of government	
12.	21 November 1976	Meghalaya	Williamson A. Sangma	All Party Hill Leaders Conference	Williamson A. Sangma	Indian National Congress	Incumbent Ruling Party MLAS Defected To Congress	
13.	16 February 1980	Rajasthan	Bhairon Singh Shekhawat	Janata Party	Jagannath Pahadia	Indian National Congress	Government dismissed in spite of Bhairon Singh Shekhawat enjoying majority support in Assembly	
14.	17 February 1980	Uttar Pradesh	Banarasi Das	Janata Party	President's rule		Government dismissed in spite of Banarasi Das enjoying majority support in Assembly	
15.	17 February 1980	Odisha	Nilamani Routray	Janata Party	Janaki Ballabh Patnaik	Indian National Congress	Government dismissed in spite of Nilamani Routray enjoying majority support in Assembly	
16.	17 February 1980	Gujarat	Babubhai J. Patel	Janata Party	Madhav Singh Solanki	Indian National Congress	Government dismissed in spite of Babubhai J Patel enjoying majority support in the Assembly	
17.	17 February 1980	Bihar	Ram Sundar Das	Janata Party	President's rule		Government dismissed in spite of Ram Sundar Das enjoying majority support in the Assembly	
18.	17 February 1980	Punjab	Parkash Singh Badal	Shiromani Akali Dal	President's rule		Government dismissed in spite of Parkash Singh Badal enjoying majority support in Assembly	
19.	17 February 1980	Maharashtra	Sharad Pawar	Indian National Congress (Socialist)	President's rule		Government dismissed in spite of Sharad Pawar enjoying majority support in the Assembly	
20.	18 February 1980	Tamil Nadu	M. G. Ramachandran	All India Anna Dravida Munnetra Kazhagam	President's rule		Government dismissed in spite of CM M. G. Ramachandran enjoying majority support in Assembly, due to Farmers Strike for subsidised electricity.	
21.	18 February 1980	Madhya Pradesh	Sunderlal Patwa	Janata Party	President's rule		Government dismissed in spite of Sundar Lal Patwa enjoying majority support in Assembly	
22.	7 May 1981	Meghalaya	B. B. Lyngdoh	All Party Hill Leaders Conference	Williamson A. Sangma	Indian National Congress	Incumbent Ruling Party MLAS Defected To Congress	
23.	31 March 1983	Meghalaya	B. B. Lyngdoh	All Party Hill Leaders Conference	Williamson A. Sangma	Indian National Congress	Incumbent Ruling Party MLAS Defected To Congress	
24.	24 June 1983	Puducherry	M. D. R. Ramachandran	Dravida Munnetra Kazhagam	President's rule		Government dismissed following withdrawal of Congress(I) from coalition government. In spite of incumbent chief minister asking for an opportunity to prove his majority on the floor of the house, the assembly was dissolved.	
25.	11 May 1984	Sikkim	Nar Bahadur Bhandari	Sikkim Janata Parishad	B. B. Gurung	Indian National Congress	Government formed following induced collapse of Nar Bahadur Bandari Sikkim Janata Parishad Government was dismissed as it did not enjoy a majority in the Assembly	
26.	2 July 1984	Jammu and Kashmir	Farooq Abdullah	Jammu & Kashmir National Conference	Ghulam Mohammad Shah	Awami National Conference	Congress Supported Rebel MLAS Of NC To Form Government	
27.	16 August 1984	Andhra Pradesh	N. T. Rama Rao	Telugu Desam Party	Nadendla Bhaskara Rao	Rebel Telugu Desam Party	Congress Supported Rebel MLAS Of TDP To Form Government	
28.	31 January 1988	Tamil Nadu	V. N. Janaki Ramachandran	All India Anna Dravida Munnetra Kazhagam	President's rule		Government dismissed after controversial confidence vote secured in the Assembly by CM V. N. Janaki Ramachandran, after death of chief minister M. G. Ramachandran.	
29.	7 September 1988	Mizoram	Laldenga	Mizo National Front	President's rule		Defections By Congress reduced the Government to minority	
30.	28 November 1990	Assam	Prafulla Kumar Mahanta	Asom Gana Parishad	President's rule		Government dismissed in spite of AGP CM Prafulla Mahanta enjoying majority support in Assembly. The dismissal was triggered apparently by the threat to internal security due to banned organisation ULFA's activities.Suspended The Government Using Article 356	
31.	10 October 1991	Meghalaya	B. B. Lyngdoh	Hill People's Union	President's rule		The Centre imposed president's rule in Meghalaya in the wake of a political crisis after the then Speaker PR Kyndiah suspended five MLAs, mostly independents, on grounds of defection	
31.	5 February 1992	Meghalaya	B. B. Lyngdoh	Hill People's Union	D. D. Lapang	Indian National Congress	Incumbent Ruling Party MLAS Defected To Congress	
32.	6 January 1992	Manipur	Raj Kumar Ranbir Singh	Manipur Peoples Party	President's rule		Incumbent Coalition MLAS Defected To Congress	
32.	8 April 1992	Manipur	Raj Kumar Ranbir Singh	Manipur Peoples Party	Raj Kumar Dorendra Singh	Indian National Congress	Incumbent Coalition MLAS Defected To Congress	
33.	2 April 1992	Nagaland	Vamuzo Phesao	Nagaland People's Council	President's rule		Fluid party position and deteriorating law and order situation	
34.	6 December 1992	Uttar Pradesh	Kalyan Singh	Bharatiya Janata Party	President's rule		Government dismissed in the aftermath of the destruction of Babri Masjid-Ram Janmasthan in Uttar Pradesh.	
35.	15 December 1992	Himachal Pradesh	Shanta Kumar	Bharatiya Janata Party	President's rule		Government dismissed in the aftermath of the destruction of Babri Masjid-Ram Janmasthan in Uttar Pradesh.	
36.	15 December 1992	Rajasthan	Bhairon Singh Shekhawat	Bharatiya Janata Party	President's rule		Government dismissed in the aftermath of the destruction of Babri Masjid-Ram Janmasthan in Uttar Pradesh.	
37.	15 December 1992	Madhya Pradesh	Sunderlal Patwa	Bharatiya Janata Party	President's rule		Government dismissed in the aftermath of the destruction of Babri Masjid-Ram Janmasthan in Uttar Pradesh.	
38.	19 September 1996	Gujarat	Suresh Mehta	Bharatiya Janata Party	Shankersinh Vaghela	Rashtriya Janata Party	Government dismissed following a controversial confidence vote. The Assembly was placed in suspended animation, which led to subsequent installation of Vaghela government, supported by Congress	
39.	2 February 2005	Goa	Manohar Parrikar	Bharatiya Janata Party	Pratapsingh Rane	Indian National Congress	Incumbent Coalition MLAS Defected To Congress	
40.	3 January 2008	Nagaland	Neiphiu Rio	Naga People's Front	President's rule		Suspended the Government using Article 356	
41.	19 March 2009	Meghalaya	Donkupar Roy	United Democratic Party	President's rule		Government dismissed after controversial confidence vote secured in the Assembly by CM Donkupar Roy	
41.	13 April 2009	Meghalaya	Donkupar Roy	United Democratic Party	D. D. Lapang	Indian National Congress	Incumbent Coalition MLAS Supported To Congress	
