= Balachandra Jarkiholi =

Indian politician

Member of the Karnataka Legislative Assembly, from Arabhavi
- Incumbent
- Assumed office 2004

Minister for Municipalities and Local Bodies Member of the Karnataka Legislative Assembly
- In office 2008–2013

Minister for Social Welfare and Member of the Karnataka Legislative Assembly
- In office 2004–2008

Chairman of the Karnataka Milk Federation
- Incumbent
- Assumed office 1 September 2019
- Preceded by: H. D. Revanna

Personal details
- Born: 1 June 1966 (age 60) Gokak
- Party: Bharatiya Janata Party
- Occupation: Politician

Balachandra Laxmanrao Jarkiholi (b 1966) is an Indian politician who is the current MLA from Arabhavi, Belagavi district and chairman of Karnataka Milk Federation. He and his 4 brothers are all very active in local politics.

== Political career ==
He was elected to the Karnataka Legislative Assembly from Arabhavi constituency in Belgaum district in 2004 and 2008 on a Janata Dal (Secular) ticket. In 2013 and 2018 he fought the election on a Bharatiya Janata Party ticket and won again from Arabhavi.

== Ministry ==
He was a Minister in the H.D. Kumaraswamy led 2004 and 2008 Government.
