= J. Narasimha Swamy =

Indian politician

J. Narasimha Swamy was an Indian politician. He was elected to the Karnataka Legislative Assembly from Doddaballapura in the 2008 Karnataka Legislative Assembly election as a member of the Indian National Congress, later as a member of Bharatiya Janata Party. He is the son of Former Textile Minister R. L. Jalappa.
