= Diggewadi =

- Village
- Location in Karnataka, India Diggewadi (India)
- Coordinates: 16.5688°N 74.7425°E
- Country: India
- State: Karnataka
- District: Belgaum
- Taluka: Raybag
- Founder: Donkaani

Population (2001)
  - Total: 6,059

Languages
  - Official: Kannada
- Time zone: UTC+5:30 (IST)
- ISO 3166 code: IN-KA
- Website: karnataka.gov.in

Diggewadi is a village in Raybag taluk in Belgaum Panchayat in the southern state of Karnataka, India. The official language of Diggewadi is Kannada.

== Geography ==
Diggewadi is located at 16.5688° N, 74.7425° E. The village is 95 km (59 mi) north of Belgaum, 15 km (9 mi) north of Raybag and 587 km (365 mi) north of the state capital. Ankali, located 8 km (5 mi) west of Diggewadi, is the major hub connecting many towns in the Maharashtra State.

Diggewadi shares its borders with Bavana Soundatti in the west, Jalalpur in the east, and both Kanchakarawadi and Yadravi in the south. The Krishna flows north of Diggewadi and crosses the Ingali village. 8 km (5 mi) east from Diggewadi is Chinchali. Among the closest cities to the village are Belgaum, Bijapur, Kolhapur, and Sangli–Miraj.

== Demographics ==
According to the 2011 State Census, Diggewadi has 881 houses and a population of 4,617. The literacy rate is 75.89 percent compared to the national average of 74.04 percent.

Agriculture is the main source of livelihood for the majority of the people living in Diggewadi.
