= Pachhapur railway station =

Railway station in Karnataka

Pachhapur

General information
- Location: State Highway 1, Rustumpur, Belagavi district, Karnatak; India
- Coordinates: 16.093145°N 74.672174°E
- Elevation: 669 metres (2,195 ft)
- System: Indian Railways station
- Owner: Indian Railways
- Operator: Indian Railways
- Line: Pune–Miraj–Londa line
- Platforms: 1
- Tracks: broad gauge

Construction
- Structure type: Standard (on ground)

Other information
- Status: Functioning
- Station code: PCH
- Zone(s): SWR
- Division(s): Hubli

Services
Preceding station	Indian Railways	Following station
Suldhal towards ?	South Western Railway zone Pune–Miraj–Londa line	Parkanhatti towards ?
Location
- Interactive map

Pachhapur railway station is a railway station located on the Pune–Miraj–Londa railway line operated by the South Western Railway zone under Hubli railway division. It is situated beside State Highway 1 at Rustumpur in Belagavi district in the Indian state of Karnatak.
