= Kudachi (Rural) =

- Town
- Location in Karnataka, India Kudachi (Rural) (India)
- Coordinates: 16.48°N 74.78°E
- Country: India
- State: Karnataka
- District: Belgaum
- Talukas: Raybag

Population (2011)
  - Total: 35,000

Languages
  - Official: Kannada Urdu
- Time zone: UTC+5:30 (IST)
- PIN -->: 591311
- Nearest city: Miraj, Sangli (Mah)

Kudachi (Rural) is an urban area in the southern state of Karnataka, India. It is located in the Raybag taluk of Belgaum district in Karnataka.

== Demographics ==
At the 2001 India census, Kudachi (rural) had a population of 13,733 with 7,232 males and 6501 females.

== See also ==
- Kudachi
- Belgaum
- Districts of Karnataka
