= Amarsinh Vasantrao Patil =

Indian politician

Amarsinh Vasanthrao Patil

Member of Parliament, Lok Sabha
- In office 1999–2004
- Preceded by: Babagouda Rudragouda Patil
- Succeeded by: Suresh Angadi
- Constituency: Belgaum

President, Zila Parishad, Belgaum district
- In office 1987–1992

Personal details
- Born: 22 September 1960 (age 66) Ghataprabha, Mysore State, India
- Party: Bharatiya Janata Party (2016–present)
- Other political affiliations: Indian National Congress (till 2016)
- Spouse: Bhagyashree A. Patil (m. 1989)
- Relations: Vivekrao Vasanthrao Patil (Brother), Pranay Vivek Patil (Nephew)
- Children: 1 Son and 1 daughter
- Parents: V.L. Patil (father); Arunadevi V. Patil (mother)

Amarsinh Vasanthrao Patil (born 1960) is an Indian politician, and member of 13th Lok Sabha. He was runner up for 13th Lok Sabha election and 15th Lok Sabha elections from Belgaum. Before being elected to Lok Sabha, he was the President Belgaum district Zila Parishad. He is the son of V.L. Patil, a politician and freedom fighter. His brother Vivekrao Vasanthrao Patil is an elected member of the legislative council and was elected independently with a record victory margin that was the highest in the state since independence. He was elected director of the Karnataka Milk Federation and then elected as the chairman. Vivekrao is a member of the Belgaum Chamber of Commerce, a chairman of the Raibag Sugar Factory and a chairman of the Belgaum District Co-operative bank. He runs a chain of over 50 educational institutions in Karnataka, Maharashtra and Goa. He is also a writer and among other things has written several novels. One of them, Dawn to Dust, was a best selling romantic tragedy novel in Europe and India. A Bollywood movie (Dhadkan) was based on it.

He was first affiliated with Indian National Congress and later joined Bharatiya Janata Party at Chinchali in Raibag Taluk of Belgaum district in presence of Pralhad Joshi, was President of the Bharatiya Janata Party, Karnataka
