= Sambre railway station =

Railway station in Karnataka

Sambre

General information
- Location: Sambra, Belagavi district, Karnatak; India
- Coordinates: 15.891068°N 74.593121°E
- Elevation: 732 metres (2,402 ft)
- System: Indian Railways station
- Owner: Indian Railways
- Operator: Indian Railways
- Line: Pune–Miraj–Londa line
- Platforms: 1
- Tracks: broad gauge

Construction
- Structure type: Standard (on ground)

Other information
- Status: Functioning
- Station code: SXB
- Zone(s): SWR
- Division(s): Hubli

Services
Preceding station	Indian Railways	Following station
Belagavi towards ?	South Western Railway zone Pune–Miraj–Londa line	Sulebhavi towards ?
Location
- Interactive map

Sambre railway station is a railway station located on the Pune–Miraj–Londa railway line operated by the South Western Railway zone under Hubli railway division. It is situated at Sambra in Belagavi district in the Indian state of Karnatak.
