= Jalalpur, Karnataka =

Village in Karnataka, India

Jalalpur
- Village
- Location within Karnataka Location within India
- Coordinates: 16°32′56″N 74°46′01″E
- Country: India
- State: Karnataka
- District: Belagavi
- Taluk: Raybag

Government
  - Type: Gram panchayat

Area
  - Total: 6.59 km^{2} (2.54 sq mi)
- Elevation: 549 m (1,801 ft)

Population (2011)
  - Total: 4,496
  - Density: 682/km^{2} (1,770/sq mi)

Languages
  - Official: Kannada
- Time zone: UTC+5:30 (IST)
- PIN: 591317
- STD code: 08331
- Vehicle registration: KA-22

Jalalpur is a village in Raybag Taluk, Belagavi District, Karnataka, India. It is located near the state border with Maharashtra, approximately 83 kilometres north of the district seat Belgaum, and 6 kilometres north of the taluk seat Raibag. As of 2011, it had a total population of 4,496.

== Geography ==
Jalalpur is situated to the south of Krishna River. It covers an area of 659.21 hectares.

== Demographics ==
According to the 2011 Indian Census, there were 874 households within Jalalpur. Out of the 4,496 residents, 2,326 are male and 2,170 are female. The overall literacy rate is 60.23%, with 1,605 of the male population and 1,103 of the female population being literate. The village's census location code is 597357.
