= V. L. Patil =

Indian politician

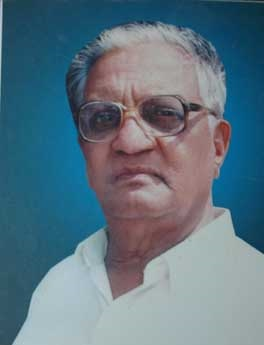

Minister for Revenue, Government of Karnataka
- In office 1985–1989

Minister for Revenue, Government of Karnataka
- In office 1983–1984

Minister for Labour, Government of Karnataka
- In office 1983–1984

Minister for Industries, Government of Karnataka
- In office 1983–1984

Minister for Transportation, Government of Karnataka
- In office 1983–1984

Minister for Social Welfare, Government of Karnataka
- In office 1972–1977

Minister for Social Welfare, Government of Karnataka
- In office 1968–1971

Minister for Horticulture, Government of Karnataka
- In office 1972–1977

Member of Parliament, Lok Sabha
- In office 1962–1967
- Preceded by: Datta Appa Katti
- Succeeded by: B. Shankaranand
- Constituency: Chikkodi

Member of the Karnataka Legislative Assembly for Kagwad
- In office 1983–1989
- Preceded by: Annarao Balappa Jakanur
- Succeeded by: Annarao Balappa Jakanur

Member of the Mysore Legislative Assembly for Raibag
- In office 1967–1978
- Preceded by: Balu Shidraya Soudagar
- Succeeded by: Rama Shidling Nadoni

Member of the Mysore Legislative Assembly for Raibag
- In office 1957–1962
- Preceded by: Position Established
- Succeeded by: Balu Shidraya Soudagar

Member of the Bombay Legislative Assembly for Chikodi Raibagh
- In office 1951–1957
- Preceded by: Position Established
- Succeeded by: Position Abolished

Personal details
- Born: 25 March 1922 Byakud, Belgaum
- Died: 9 December 2012 (aged 90) Bangalore, India
- Party: Indian National Congress (1960–1977, 1999–2012)
- Other political affiliations: Independent(Till 1959) Janata Party (1977–1988) Janata Dal (1988–1999)
- Spouse: Arunadevi
- Children: 3, including Vivekrao and Amarsinh
- Occupation: Politician

Vasanthrao Lakangouda Patil (25 March 1922 – 9 December 2012), widely known as 'Aabaji' was an Indian politician, industrialist, and freedom fighter.

== Early life and education ==
Vasantrao Patil was born on 25 March 1922 to a Kuruba-Patil (Dhangar) family in Byakud village, Bombay state. He was born to Sidagouda and Anandibai Patil. Patil had an older sister and a younger brother, Hutatma Prataprao. His ancestors administered the surrounding region on behalf of Shahu Maharaj of Kolhapur (Shahaji II). He began his higher education at Rajaram College, Kolhapur, but was unable to complete his degree due to his involvement in the freedom movement.

== Freedom movement ==
Under influence of his teachers like M.R. Desai, Acharya Jawadekar, N.S. Hardikar and barrister Khardekar, Vasantrao was instilled the spirit of patriotism and social service. While in Kolhapur he came in contact with a radical freedom fighter by the name of Nana Patil (Kranti Sinha), who further bolstered his decision to take part in the freedom struggle. Under Nana's guidance both Vasantrao and Prataprao became heavily involved in orchestrating skirmishes in the areas which are today known as Southern Maharashtra and North Karnataka. This led to the assassination of his younger brother Prataprao. Due to the grief of losing his only brother, Vasantrao left college in 1943 and became fully involved in the freedom struggle. As Vasantrao's reputation strengthened, he became one of the most wanted men in the region, leading to a 'shoot at sight' imposition by the British administration.

== Political career ==
Patil first entered politics when he was elected M.L.A. from Chikodi Raibagh in 1952 as an Independent candidate, and became the first elected representative for the area post independence. In 1957 he contested successfully once again as an independent candidate from Raibag, which was merged into the newly created State of Karnataka. He won the election with a significant majority and in addition to this, wielded considerable power across Bombay-Karnataka districts. These events stunned Jawaharlal Nehru, the Prime Minister of India at the time. This caused Nehru to invite Patil to Delhi because Nehru wanted to see the person who had shattered the 'Congress storm'. Nehru invited him to the Congress Party but Patil rejected the offer, as he was a staunch opponent of Nehruvian Socialism (however, he later joined the Congress Party after requests from senior leaders at the time). Below are details of further positions held by Patil:

- 1962–1967 Member of Parliament from Chikkodi (IND)
- 1968–1971 M.L.A. from Raibag & Minister of Social Welfare under the Veerendra Patil government (INC)
- 1972–1977 M.L.A. from Raibag & Minister of Social Welfare and Horticulture under the Devraj Urs government (INC)
- Between 1972 and 1977 he was member of Central Congress Working Committee and wielded great influence over the Congress Party in Karnataka.
- 1983–1984 M.L.A. from Kagwad & Minister of Industries, Labour, Transportation and Revenue under the Ramakrishna Hegde government (JP)
- 1985–1989 M.L.A. from Kagwad & Revenue Minister under the Ramakrishna Hegde and S. R. Bommai government (JP)

During his political years Patil is credited with implementing various irrigation schemes which turned barren lands into sugarcane belts: for this he was referred to as ‘ನಡೆದಾಡುವ ದೇವರು’ (walking titan) and ‘ಹಸಿರು ಕ್ರಾಂತಿಯ ಹರಿಕಾರ’ (the forerunner of the Green Revolution) by farmers in the region. Patil's popularity was such that other politicians feared to contest elections against him, thus garnering the name ‘The Tiger of Raibag'. Among his many acquaintances, B.R. Ambedkar ('the father of the Indian Constitution') was one of Patil's most revered friends. Patil actively supported Ambedkar during his campaigns and would often seek his advice regarding politics and society.

== Industry and social service ==
Patil established one of the first cooperative sugar factories in Karnataka, Raibag Sahakara Sakkare Karkhane. Additionally, he set up a trust fund called 'Hutatma Prataprao Trust' in the name of his slain brother to provide financial assistance to farmers and students. Adding on to the trust fund, Patil set up a chain of educational institutions under the name of Shikshan Prasarak Mandal Education Society Raibag, which operates 3 degree colleges, 7 junior colleges, 10 high schools, 4 D. ed. Colleges, 1 B. ed. College, and 1 DMC college in Belgaum, Karnataka. Patil was also involved in setting up educational institutions in Kolhapur. Shikshan Prasarak Mandal Kolhapur was set up by Patil, M.R. Desai and barrister Kharadekar. Patil was chairman of the Karnataka Health Institute in Ghataprabha, and was instrumental in modernising the rural hospital which provides medicines and treatments to the rural populace.

A few years prior to his death, Patil established another private sugar factory, Bhagyashri Lagmawwa Sugars Ltd. in his hometown Bekkeri and had fully planned another factory in nearby Alagawadi. He was awarded the Indira Gandhi Sadbhavana National Award in 2008 for the various social endeavours in his life.

== Personal life ==
Patil married Arunadevi and had four children: Prataprao, Prathibha, Vivekrao and Amarsinh. Prathibha, an active politician, died in 2003. Amarsinh is a barrister (LLM, University of Cambridge) . He was the elected Member of Parliament (INC) from Belgaum (1999–2004) during the NDA regime. Amarsinh now manages the Shikshan Prasarak (SP) Mandal Raibag, and Bhagyashri Lagmawwa Sugars after the death of Patil. Prataprao is another well known political leader in the area. Vivekrao is a recognised educationalist who runs the Mahakali Education Society, which manages a chain of schools and colleges in Belgaum District. He is the elected president of the Karnataka milk federation, Belgaum District.

V.L. Patil died on 9 December 2012 in Bangalore, India due to a long-standing illness. Patil was cremated in his home village Bekkeri, with full state honours.

== See also ==
- List of political families
- Indian Independence Activists
