= Suldhal railway station =

Railway station in Karnataka, India

Suldhal

General information
- Location: Suladhal, Belagavi district, Karnatak; India
- Coordinates: 16.001728°N 74.678143°E
- Elevation: 684 metres (2,244 ft)
- System: Indian Railways station
- Owner: Indian Railways
- Operator: Indian Railways
- Line: Pune–Miraj–Londa line
- Platforms: 1
- Tracks: broad gauge

Construction
- Structure type: Standard (on ground)

Other information
- Status: Functioning
- Station code: SUL
- Zone(s): SWR
- Division(s): Hubli

Services
| Preceding station | Indian Railways | Following station |
|---|---|---|
| Sulebhavi towards ? | South Western Railway zone Pune–Miraj–Londa line | Pachhapur towards ? |
Location
- Interactive map

Suldhal railway station is a railway station located on the Pune–Miraj–Londa railway line operated by the South Western Railway zone under Hubli railway division. It is situated at Suladhal in Belagavi district in the Indian state of Karnatak.
