= Sulebhavi railway station =

Railway station in Karnataka

Sulebhavi

General information
- Location: Sulebhavi, Belagavi district, Karnatak; India
- Coordinates: 15.912563°N 74.641724°E
- Elevation: 734 metres (2,408 ft)
- System: Indian Railways station
- Owner: Indian Railways
- Operator: Indian Railways
- Line: Pune–Miraj–Londa line
- Platforms: 1
- Tracks: broad gauge

Construction
- Structure type: Standard (on ground)

Other information
- Status: Functioning
- Station code: SBH
- Zone(s): SWR
- Division(s): Hubli

Services
Preceding station	Indian Railways	Following station
Sambre towards ?	South Western Railway zone Pune–Miraj–Londa line	Suldhal towards ?
Location
- Interactive map

Sulebhavi railway station is a railway station located on the Pune–Miraj–Londa railway line operated by the South Western Railway zone under Hubli railway division. It is situated at Sulebhavi in Belagavi district in the Indian state of Karnatak.
