= Raibag Assembly constituency =

Legislative Assembly constituency in Karnataka, India

Coordinates: 16.49°N 74.77°E

Raibag
- Constituency No. 6 for the Karnataka Legislative Assembly

Constituency details
- Country: India
- Region: South India
- State: Karnataka
- District: Belagavi
- Lok Sabha constituency: Chikkodi
- Established: 1956
- Total electors: 213,888 (2023)
- Reservation: SC

Member of Legislative Assembly
- 16th Karnataka Legislative Assembly
- Incumbent Duryodhan Aihole
- Party: Bharatiya Janata Party
- Elected year: 2023
- Preceded by: Bheemappa Sarikar

Raibag Assembly constituency is one of the 224 constituencies in the Karnataka Legislative Assembly of Karnataka, a southern state of India. Raibag is also part of Chikkodi Lok Sabha constituency.

== Members of the Legislative Assembly ==
Election	Member	Party
1952	V. L. Patil	Independent politician
1957	V. L. Patil	Independent politician
1957	Talwalkar Sampatrao Pradhanji	Scheduled Castes Federation
1962	Balu Shidraya Soudagar	Indian National Congress
1967	V. L. Patil	Indian National Congress
1972	V. L. Patil	Indian National Congress
1978	Nadoni Rama Shidling	Janata Party
1983	Kamble Shravana Satyappa	Janata Party
1985	Ghewari Maruti Gangappa	Janata Party
1989	Ghatage Shama Bhima	Indian National Congress
1994	Ghatage Shama Bhima	Indian National Congress
1999	Ghatage Shama Bhima	Indian National Congress
2004	Sarikar Bheemappa Channappa	Janata Dal
2008	Duryodhan Aihole	Bharatiya Janata Party
2013	Duryodhan Aihole	Bharatiya Janata Party
2018	Duryodhan Aihole	Bharatiya Janata Party
2023	Duryodhan Aihole	Bharatiya Janata Party

== Election results ==
=== Assembly Election 2023 ===
2023 Karnataka Legislative Assembly election : Raibag
Party	Candidate	Votes	%	±%
BJP	Duryodhan Aihole	57,500	34.79%	▼10.09
Independent	Shambhu Kallolikar	54,930	33.23%	New
JD(S)	Pradeepkumar R. Malagi	25,393	15.36%	New
INC	Mahaveer Laxman Mohite	22,685	13.72%	▼20.16
NOTA	None of the above	1,860	1.13%	▲0.34
AAP	Shankar Subrav Khatedar	1,057	0.64%	New
Margin of victory		2,570	1.55%	▼9.45
Turnout		165,698	78.36%	▲1.51
Total valid votes		165,288		
Registered electors		211,461		▲7.97
BJP hold		Swing	▼10.09	

=== Assembly Election 2018 ===
2018 Karnataka Legislative Assembly election : Raibag
Party	Candidate	Votes	%	±%
BJP	Duryodhan Aihole	67,502	44.88%	▲14.14
INC	Pradeepkumar R. Malagi	50,954	33.88%	▲9.28
Independent	Mahaveer Mohite	24,627	16.37%	New
BSP	Dr. Rajeev Kamble	1,724	1.15%	▲0.11
NOTA	None of the above	1,184	0.79%	New
Margin of victory		16,548	11.00%	▲10.32
Turnout		150,508	76.85%	▲1.68
Total valid votes		150,399		
Registered electors		195,850		▲20.46
BJP hold		Swing	▲14.14	

=== Assembly Election 2013 ===
2013 Karnataka Legislative Assembly election : Raibag
Party	Candidate	Votes	%	±%
BJP	Duryodhan Aihole	37,535	30.74%	▼9.95
Independent	Pradeepkumar R. Malagi	36,706	30.06%	New
INC	Kiranagi Sukumar Pundalik	30,043	24.60%	▼1.05
JD(S)	Babu Shankar Bagewadi	7,338	6.01%	▼12.94
KJP	Balasab Shamrao Waddar	3,983	3.26%	New
Independent	Prabhakar Hanamant Gaggari	2,040	1.67%	New
BSP	Mayur Shravan Madale	1,275	1.04%	▼2.72
Margin of victory		829	0.68%	▼14.37
Turnout		122,221	75.17%	▲9.11
Total valid votes		122,106		
Registered electors		162,587		▲10.95
BJP hold		Swing	▼9.95	

=== Assembly Election 2008 ===
2008 Karnataka Legislative Assembly election : Raibag
Party	Candidate	Votes	%	±%
BJP	Duryodhan Aihole	39,378	40.69%	New
INC	Omprakash S. Kanagali	24,818	25.65%	▼10.22
JD(S)	Balasab Shamrao Waddar	18,342	18.95%	▲17.11
BSP	Dr. Sanjay Naduwinmani	3,637	3.76%	▼0.74
Rashtriya Hindustan Sena Karnataka	Vasanth Kumar. T. S	2,663	2.75%	New
Independent	Ratnamala Savanoor	1,193	1.23%	New
Independent	Ravindra Bhimrao Lakshannavar	1,181	1.22%	New
Independent	Mahaveer Sattyappa Sane	1,176	1.22%	New
Independent	Honole Gajendra Annappa	830	0.86%	New
Margin of victory		14,560	15.05%	▲6.71
Turnout		96,812	66.06%	▼0.48
Total valid votes		96,772		
Registered electors		146,543		▼20.25
BJP gain from JD(U)		Swing	▼3.51	

=== Assembly Election 2004 ===
2004 Karnataka Legislative Assembly election : Raibag
Party	Candidate	Votes	%	±%
JD(U)	Sarikar Bheemappa Channappa	54,049	44.20%	▲0.80
INC	Laxman Yamanappa Kamble	43,855	35.87%	▼14.18
KRRS	Balakrishna Ramappa Kadam	6,410	5.24%	New
BSP	Dr. Savakar S. Kamble	5,507	4.50%	New
JP	Ghatge Jayakumar Rajaram	2,753	2.25%	New
JD(S)	Rayannavar Vijayanand Shahurao	2,248	1.84%	▲1.07
Independent	Mahaveer Ramachandra Aihole	1,667	1.36%	New
Kannada Nadu Party	Sadashiv Ramappa Pol	1,045	0.85%	New
Independent	Deepak Alias Dileep Annsaheb Koravi	884	0.72%	New
Margin of victory		10,194	8.34%	▲1.69
Turnout		122,280	66.54%	▲2.00
Total valid votes		122,275		
Registered electors		183,764		▲9.19
JD(U) gain from INC		Swing	▼5.85	

=== Assembly Election 1999 ===
1999 Karnataka Legislative Assembly election : Raibag
Party	Candidate	Votes	%	±%
INC	Ghatage Shama Bhima	52,728	50.05%	▲14.28
JD(U)	Parashuram Yallappa Jaganur	45,720	43.40%	New
Independent	Baburav K. Kambale	4,062	3.86%	New
Independent	Mani Sadashiv Sangappa Dada	972	0.92%	New
JD(S)	Gangaram Mahadev Dodamani	815	0.77%	New
Margin of victory		7,008	6.65%	▼1.42
Turnout		108,631	64.54%	▲5.53
Total valid votes		105,348		
Rejected ballots		3,266	3.01%	▲0.13
Registered electors		168,304		▲6.79
INC hold		Swing	▲14.28	

=== Assembly Election 1994 ===
1994 Karnataka Legislative Assembly election : Raibag
Party	Candidate	Votes	%	±%
INC	Ghatage Shama Bhima	32,297	35.77%	▼7.12
JD	Murgod Dundappa. D	25,008	27.70%	▼6.55
KRRS	Bhavimani Saidappa. B	10,564	11.70%	New
INC	Nadoni Rama Shidling	8,434	9.34%	New
Independent	Kamble Krishna Yamanappa	7,820	8.66%	New
BJP	Golasangi Vasudev. C	3,683	4.08%	New
Independent	Kamble Satteppa Bhimappa	1,481	1.64%	New
Independent	Kamble Sadashiv Bhujappa	622	0.69%	New
Margin of victory		7,289	8.07%	▼0.57
Turnout		92,999	59.01%	▼7.12
Total valid votes		90,281		
Rejected ballots		2,683	2.88%	▼4.26
Registered electors		157,606		▲9.38
INC hold		Swing	▼7.12	

=== Assembly Election 1989 ===
1989 Karnataka Legislative Assembly election : Raibag
Party	Candidate	Votes	%	±%
INC	Ghatage Shama Bhima	37,948	42.89%	▼5.31
JD	Ghewari Maruti Gangappa	30,300	34.25%	New
Kranti Sabha	Madhukar Krishna Sannakki	15,290	17.28%	New
Independent	Shravan Satteppa Kamble	2,416	2.73%	New
JP	Kumar. S. Durganwar	1,422	1.61%	New
Margin of victory		7,648	8.64%	▲5.04
Turnout		95,282	66.13%	▼5.32
Total valid votes		88,477		
Rejected ballots		6,805	7.14%	▲5.68
Registered electors		144,092		▲26.33
INC gain from JP		Swing	▼8.91	

=== Assembly Election 1985 ===
1985 Karnataka Legislative Assembly election : Raibag
Party	Candidate	Votes	%	±%
JP	Ghewari Maruti Gangappa	41,597	51.80%	▲1.08
INC	Basanaik Shrimant Krishna	38,706	48.20%	▲2.80
Margin of victory		2,891	3.60%	▼1.73
Turnout		81,494	71.45%	▼0.46
Total valid votes		80,303		
Rejected ballots		1,191	1.46%	▼1.10
Registered electors		114,058		▲29.24
JP hold		Swing	▲1.08	

=== Assembly Election 1983 ===
1983 Karnataka Legislative Assembly election : Raibag
Party	Candidate	Votes	%	±%
JP	Kamble Shravana Satyappa	31,365	50.72%	▲13.22
INC	Nadoni Rama Shidling	28,071	45.40%	▲13.42
BJP	Kamble Bhagavant Nigappa	1,032	1.67%	New
Independent	Tatoba Dadu Kamble	878	1.42%	New
Independent	Katti Ramachandra Dashrath	490	0.79%	New
Margin of victory		3,294	5.33%	▼0.19
Turnout		63,463	71.91%	▲6.73
Total valid votes		61,836		
Rejected ballots		1,627	2.56%	▼0.65
Registered electors		88,256		▲12.46
JP hold		Swing	▲13.22	

=== Assembly Election 1978 ===
1978 Karnataka Legislative Assembly election : Raibag
Party	Candidate	Votes	%	±%
JP	Nadoni Rama Shidling	18,562	37.50%	New
INC	Holer Laxman Vithal	15,830	31.98%	▼38.10
INC(I)	Ramachandra Adrashappa Doddamani	14,875	30.05%	New
Margin of victory		2,732	5.52%	▼34.65
Turnout		51,148	65.18%	▼6.13
Total valid votes		49,505		
Rejected ballots		1,643	3.21%	▲3.21
Registered electors		78,476		▲3.99
JP gain from INC		Swing	▼32.58	

=== Assembly Election 1972 ===
1972 Mysore State Legislative Assembly election : Raibag
Party	Candidate	Votes	%	±%
INC	Vasanthrao Lakangouda Patil	36,372	70.08%	▼11.89
INC(O)	Sidling Rama Bane	15,526	29.92%	New
Margin of victory		20,846	40.17%	▼23.76
Turnout		53,813	71.31%	▲7.53
Total valid votes		51,898		
Registered electors		75,463		▲18.59
INC hold		Swing	▼11.89	

=== Assembly Election 1967 ===
1967 Mysore State Legislative Assembly election : Raibag
Party	Candidate	Votes	%	±%
INC	Vasanthrao Lakangouda Patil	31,732	81.97%	▼7.32
Independent	N. B. Kamappa	6,981	18.03%	New
Margin of victory		24,751	63.93%	▼14.65
Turnout		40,586	63.78%	▲3.28
Total valid votes		38,713		
Registered electors		63,633		▲26.02
INC hold		Swing	▼7.32	

=== Assembly Election 1962 ===
1962 Mysore State Legislative Assembly election : Raibag
Party	Candidate	Votes	%	±%
INC	Balu Shidraya Soudagar	26,049	89.29%	▲52.55
RPI	Vasant Gurupad Pattan	3,125	10.71%	New
Margin of victory		22,924	78.58%	▲66.33
Turnout		30,548	60.50%	▼0.38
Total valid votes		29,174		
Registered electors		50,493		▼45.90
INC gain from Independent		Swing	▲56.67	

=== Assembly Election 1957 ===
1957 Mysore State Legislative Assembly election : Raibag
Party	Candidate	Votes	%	±%
Independent	Vasanthrao Lakangouda Patil	37,070	32.62%	New
SCF	Talwalkar Sampatrao Pradhanji	32,553	28.65%	New
INC	Shah Balachandra Premchandra	23,152	20.38%	▼23.14
INC	Kambale Shivrudrappa Udapa	18,593	16.36%	▼27.16
Independent	Shetti Shrimandar Balappa	2,259	1.99%	New
Margin of victory		13,918	12.25%	▼0.70
Turnout		113,627	60.88%	▼10.53
Total valid votes		113,627		
Registered electors		93,325		▲129.34
Independent hold		Swing	▼23.86	

=== Assembly Election 1952 ===
1952 Bombay State Legislative Assembly election : Chikkodi Raibagh
Party	Candidate	Votes	%	±%
Independent	Vasanthrao Lakangouda Patil	16,410	56.48%	New
INC	Dalavai Ningappa Bahadur	12,647	43.52%	New
Margin of victory		3,763	12.95%	
Turnout		29,057	71.41%	
Total valid votes		29,057		
Registered electors		40,692		
Independent win (new seat)				

== See also ==
- Raibag (Rural)
- Belagavi district
- Chikkodi Lok Sabha constituency
- List of constituencies of Karnataka Legislative Assembly
