= Kabbur =

- Village
- Location in Karnataka, India Kabbur (India)
- Coordinates: 16.349°N 74.729°E
- Country: India
- State: Karnataka
- District: Belgaum
- Talukas: mudalagi

Population (2011)
  - Total: 18,868

Languages
  - Official: Kannada
- Time zone: UTC+5:30 (IST)
- Postal code: 591222
- Website: http://www.kabburtown.mrc.gov.in

Kabbur is a town in the southern state of Karnataka, India. It is located in the Chikodi taluk of Belgaum district in Karnataka.

== Demographics ==
Kabbur has 2059 families residing in it. The Kabbur town has a population of 18868 of which 5543 are males and 5406 are females as per Population Census 2011.

In Kabbur town the population of children with age 0-6 is 1800, which makes up 16.44% of the total population of the village. The average sex ratio of Kabbur village is 975 which is higher than Karnataka state average of 973. Child Sex Ratio for the Kabbur as per census is 978, higher than Karnataka average of 948.

Kabbur town has a lower literacy rate compared to Karnataka. In 2011, the literacy rate of Kabbur village was 65.79% compared to the 75.36% of Karnataka. In Kabbur male literacy stands at 74.21% while the female literacy rate was 57.15%.

Kabbur is administrated by Sarpanch (Head of Village) who is elected representative of village. The Town Panchayat (TP) Kabbur was constituted in 2015. It is located 20 km from Chikkodi and famous for Sugarcane. Name of this village derived from an inscription found in kalmeshwar temple which is mentioned as "piriyara agrahara karaburu" which is modified into present Kabbur. It has more than 25 temples and at least once in a month there will be a fair(jatre). It is also famous for Datti Kunitha and Mallkamba. The TP has 19 wards. Kabbur TP stretches to an area of 12.00 km^{2}. The town has the famous Kalmeshwar temple, Hanuman temple, Jain temple, church, Masjid and Gourishankar Math. Agriculture is the main occupation.

== Getting there ==
By Road

Chikodi is 20 km from Kabbur and is the nearest city.

By Train

Nearby railway stations are Chikodi Road railway station, Bagewadi railway station and Sangli railway station which are major railway station 65 km near to Kabbur.

== See also ==
- Belgaum
- Districts of Karnataka
