= Devanakatti =

- Village
- Country: India
- State: Karnataka
- District: Belgaum
- Taluka: Raybag

Government
  - Type: Panchayat raj

Languages
  - Official: Kannada
- Time zone: UTC+5:30 (IST)

Devanakatti is a village located in the Raybag taluk of Belgaum district, in the southern Indian state of Karnataka. It is administered under the Panchayati raj system of local governance.

== See also ==
- Raybag
- Belgaum district
- Villages in Karnataka
