= Yabaratti =

- Village
- Country: India
- State: Karnataka
- District: Belgaum
- Talukas: Raybag

Population (2011)
  - Total: Around 4,500

Languages
  - Official: Kannada
- Time zone: UTC+5:30 (IST)
- Postal code: 591220
- Vehicle registration: KA23, KA71

Yabaratti (ಯಬರಟ್ಟಿ) is a village in Belgaum district in the southern state of Karnataka, India. Yabaratti is mainly known for its education. Most of the families here are educated and people are in different positions across the jobs.It is 118 km from Belgaum. The famous Basaveshwara, Hanuman, Vitthal, and Oghasiddeshwar temples are also located here. Siddhivinayak Yuva Tarun Sangh is also famous here.This village has made a huge contribution to sugarcane cultivation.The youth here give great encouragement to sports. Recently added to the Gram Panchayat list Gram Panchayat Yabaratti ಗ್ರಾಮ ಪಂಚಾಯಿತಿ ಯಬರಟ್ಟಿ,
