= Alakhanur =

- Village
- Location in Karnataka, India Alakhanur (India)
- Coordinates: 16.48°N 74.78°E
- Country: India
- State: Karnataka
- District: Belgaum
- Talukas: Raybag

Population (2001)
  - Total: 8,865

Languages
  - Official: Kannada
- Time zone: UTC+5:30 (IST)

Alakhanur is a village in the southern state of Karnataka, India. It is located in the Raybag taluk of Belgaum district in Karnataka.

== Demographics ==
As of 2001 India census, Alakhanur had a population of 8865 with 4573 males and 4292 females.

== See also ==
- Belgaum
- Districts of Karnataka
