= Rayabag railway station =

Railway station in Karnataka

Rayabag

General information
- Location: Nagarala, Raybag, Belagavi district, Karnatak; India
- Coordinates: 16.483374°N 74.806825°E
- Elevation: 595 metres (1,952 ft)
- System: Indian Railways station
- Owner: Indian Railways
- Operator: Indian Railways
- Line: Pune–Miraj–Londa line
- Platforms: 3
- Tracks: broad gauge

Construction
- Structure type: Standard (on ground)

Other information
- Status: Functioning
- Station code: RBG
- Zone(s): SWR
- Division(s): Hubli

Services
Preceding station	Indian Railways	Following station
Chikodi Road towards ?	South Western Railway zone Pune–Miraj–Londa line	Chinchli towards ?
Location
- Interactive map

Rayabag railway station is a railway station located on the Pune–Miraj–Londa railway line operated by the South Western Railway zone under Hubli railway division. It is situated at Nagarala, Raybag in Belagavi district in the Indian state of Karnatak.
