= Itanal =

- Village
- Location in Karnataka, India Itanal (India)
- Coordinates: 16.48°N 74.78°E
- Country: India
- State: Karnataka
- District: Belgaum
- Talukas: Raybag

Population (2001)
  - Total: 6,613

Languages
  - Official: Kannada
- Time zone: UTC+5:30 (IST)

Itanal is a village in the southern state of Karnataka, India. It is located in the Raybag taluk of Belgaum district in Karnataka.

== Demographics ==
At the 2001 India census, Itanal had a population of 6613 comprising 3339 males and 3274 females.

== See also ==
- Belgaum
- Districts of Karnataka
