= Shedbal railway station =

Railway station in Karnataka

General information
- Location: Shedbal, Belagavi district, Karnatak; India
- Coordinates: 16.720293°N 74.752769°E
- Elevation: 592 metres (1,942 ft)
- System: Indian Railways station
- Owner: Indian Railways
- Operator: Indian Railways
- Line: Pune–Miraj–Londa line
- Platforms: 1
- Tracks: broad gauge

Construction
- Structure type: Standard (on ground)

Other information
- Status: Functioning
- Station code: SED
- Zone(s): SWR
- Division(s): Hubli

Services
Preceding station	Indian Railways	Following station
Ugar Khurd towards ?	South Western Railway zone Pune–Miraj–Londa line	Vijaynagar towards ?
Location
- Interactive map

Shedbal railway station is a railway station located on the Pune–Miraj–Londa railway line operated by the South Western Railway zone under Hubli railway division. It is situated at Shedbal in Belagavi district in the Indian state of Karnatak.
