= Nipanal =

- Village
- Location in Karnataka, India Nipanal (India)
- Coordinates: 16.48°N 74.78°E
- Country: India
- State: Karnataka
- District: Belgaum
- Talukas: Raibag

Population (2001)
  - Total: 5,269

Languages
  - Official: Kannada
- Time zone: UTC+5:30 (IST)
- Nearest city: Raibag

Nipanal is a village in the southern state of Karnataka, India. It is located in the Raybag taluk of Belgaum district in Karnataka.

== Demographics ==
As of 2001 India census, Nipanal had a population of 5269 with 2667 males and 2602 females.

== See also ==
- Belgaum
- Districts of Karnataka
