= Chikodi Road railway station =

Railway station in Karnataka

Chikodi Road

General information
- Location: Kabbur, Belagavi district, Karnatak; India
- Coordinates: 16.369048°N 74.769494°E
- Elevation: 664 metres (2,178 ft)
- System: Indian Railways station
- Owner: Indian Railways
- Operator: Indian Railways
- Line: Pune–Miraj–Londa line
- Platforms: 1
- Tracks: broad gauge

Construction
- Structure type: Standard (on ground)

Other information
- Status: Functioning
- Station code: CKR
- Zone(s): SWR
- Division(s): Hubli

Services
Preceding station	Indian Railways	Following station
Bagewadi towards ?	South Western Railway zone Pune–Miraj–Londa line	Rayabag towards ?
Location
- Interactive map

Chikodi Road railway station is a railway station located on the Pune–Miraj–Londa railway line operated by the South Western Railway zone under Hubli railway division. It is situated at Kabbur in Belagavi district in the Indian state of Karnatak.
