= Parkanhatti railway station =

Railway station in Karnataka

Parkanhatti

General information
- Location: Parakanhatti, Belagavi district, Karnatak; India
- Coordinates: 16.140169°N 74.695447°E
- Elevation: 650 metres (2,130 ft)
- System: Indian Railways station
- Owner: Indian Railways
- Operator: Indian Railways
- Line: Pune–Miraj–Londa line
- Platforms: 1
- Tracks: broad gauge

Construction
- Structure type: Standard (on ground)

Other information
- Status: Functioning
- Station code: PRKH
- Zone(s): SWR
- Division(s): Hubli

Services
Preceding station	Indian Railways	Following station
Pachhapur towards ?	South Western Railway zone Pune–Miraj–Londa line	Gokak Road towards ?
Location
- Interactive map

Parkanhatti railway station is a halt railway station located on the Pune–Miraj–Londa railway line operated by the South Western Railway zone under Hubli railway division. It is situated at Parakanhatti in Belagavi district in the Indian state of Karnatak.
