= Mayakka Temple, Chinchali =

Hindu place of worship in Karnataka, India

Mayakka Devi Temple

Religion
- Affiliation: Hinduism
- District: Belagavi

Location
- Location: Chinchali, Raybag taluk
- State: Karnataka
- Country: India

Website
- http://www.chinchalimayakkadevi.com/

Mayakka Temple is a temple of Hindu worshiped goddess Mayakka Devi, who is worshipped by the different names such as Mahakali, Mhakubai, Mayavva etc. The temple is situated in Chinchali village of Raybag taluk in Belagavi district, Karnataka, India.

== History ==
As per the records of 1881, it is said that the goddess Mayakka Devi hail from Maanadesh (Atpadi taluka and nearby from Sangli district of Maharashtra). The legend is that she came here chasing two demons named kila and Kattai and killed them at this place and settled here after that.

== Fair ==
A fair is held yearly at the temple in the month of February and usually runs for a month. It includes chariot pulling, various sports competitions like bull race and several recreational events like circus, popular dramas and music concerts.

== Trust ==
The temple trust was formed in the year 1998.
