= Chinchli railway station =

Railway station in Karnataka

Chinchli

General information
- Location: Chinchali, Belagavi district, Karnatak; India
- Coordinates: 16.571697°N 74.855323°E
- Elevation: 561 metres (1,841 ft)
- System: Indian Railways station
- Owner: Indian Railways
- Operator: Indian Railways
- Line: Pune–Miraj–Londa line
- Platforms: 1
- Tracks: broad gauge

Construction
- Structure type: Standard (on ground)

Other information
- Status: Functioning
- Station code: CNC
- Zone(s): SWR
- Division(s): Hubli

Services
Preceding station	Indian Railways	Following station
Rayabag towards ?	South Western Railway zone Pune–Miraj–Londa line	Kudachi towards ?
Location
- Interactive map

Chinchli railway station is a railway station located on the Pune–Miraj–Londa railway line operated by the South Western Railway zone under Hubli railway division. It is situated at Chinchali in Belagavi district in the Indian state of Karnatak.
