= Yelpratti =

- Village
- Country: India
- State: Karnataka
- District: Belgaum
- Taluka: Raybag

Population (2011)
  - Total: 6,542

Languages
  - Official: Kannada
- Time zone: UTC+5:30 (IST)
- ISO 3166 code: IN-KA

Yelpratti is a village in the Raybag taluka of Belgaum district in the southern Indian state of Karnataka. As of the 2011 Indian census, it had a population of 6,542.
