= Bommanal =

- Village
- Country: India
- State: Karnataka
- District: Belgaum
- Talukas: Raybag

Languages
  - Official: Kannada
- Time zone: UTC+5:30 (IST)
- ISO 3166 code: IN-KA

Bommanal is a village in Belgaum district in the southern state of Karnataka, India.The Village Bommanal is situated in Raibag Taluka and the Village is famous for Bhaireshwar Temple i.e. oldest Kal Bhairav Temple. "Om Bhaireshwar Namah" is the mantra of Lord Bhaireshwar.
