= Bhiradi =

- Village
- Location in Karnataka, India Bhiradi (India)
- Coordinates: 16.48°N 74.78°E
- Country: India
- State: Karnataka
- District: Belgaum
- Talukas: Raybag

Population (2001)
  - Total: 7,743

Languages
  - Official: Kannada
- Time zone: UTC+5:30 (IST)

Bhiradi is a village in the southern state of Karnataka, India. It is located in the Raybag taluk of Belgaum district in Karnataka.

Murshiddeswar Temple Bhiradi

Mahadev Temple

Margadevi Temple Bhiradi

== Demographics ==
As of 2001 India census, Bhiradi had a population of 7743 with 4029 males and 3714 females.

MARGADEVI TEMPLE NEAR AMBEDKAR NAGAR BHIRADI

== ಮುರಸ್ದಿದ್ದೇಶ್ವರ ದೇವಸ್ಥಾನ ==
- ೮೦೦ ವರ್ಷದ ಇತಿಹಾಸ ವುಳ್ಳ ಪ್ರಸಿದ್ಧ ದೇವಸ್ಥಾನ ಇದು.
- ಪ್ರತಿ ವರ್ಷ ದೀಪಾವಳಿ ಹಬ್ಬದ ಸಂದರ್ಭದಲ್ಲಿ ಜಾತ್ರೆ ನಡೆಯುತ್ತದೆ.
- ಯಾವುದೆ ಭೇದ ಭಾವ ವಿಲ್ಲದೆ ಈ ಜಾತ್ರೆಯಲ್ಲಿ ಊರಿನ ಜನರು ಪಾಲ್ಗೊಳ್ಳುವರು.
