= Kudachi railway station =

Railway station in Karnataka

Kudachi

General information
- Location: Kudachi, Belagavi district, Karnatak; India
- Coordinates: 16.62608°N 74.858687°E
- Elevation: 548 metres (1,798 ft)
- System: Indian Railways station
- Owner: Indian Railways
- Operator: Indian Railways
- Line: Pune–Miraj–Londa line
- Platforms: 2
- Tracks: broad gauge

Construction
- Structure type: Standard (on ground)

Other information
- Status: Functioning
- Station code: KUD
- Zone(s): SWR
- Division(s): Hubli

Services
Preceding station	Indian Railways	Following station
Chinchli towards ?	South Western Railway zone Pune–Miraj–Londa line	Ugar Khurd towards ?
Location
- Interactive map

Kudachi railway station is a railway station located on the Pune–Miraj–Londa railway line operated by the South Western Railway zone under Hubli railway division. It is situated at Kudachi in Belagavi district in the Indian state of Karnatak.
