= Nilaji =

- Village
- Country: India
- State: Karnataka
- District: Belgaum
- Taluka: Raibag

Area
  - Total: 1,596.38 ha (3,944.7 acres)

Population (2011)
  - Total: 6,904
  - Density: 432.5/km^{2} (1,120/sq mi)

Languages
  - Official: Kannada
- Time zone: UTC+5:30 (IST)

Nilaji is a village in Belgaum district of Karnataka, India. It is located in Raibag taluk.

== Demographics ==
As of the 2011 Census of India, Nilaji has a total population of 6,904, with 3,552 males, 3,352 females and 1,177 households. The Scheduled Castes and Scheduled Tribes comprise 2,203 and 47 of the population.
