= Ghataprabha railway station =

Railway station in Karnataka

Ghataprabha

General information
- Location: Ghataprabha, Belagavi district, Karnatak; India
- Coordinates: 16.240719°N 74.759823°E
- Elevation: 626 metres (2,054 ft)
- System: Indian Railways station
- Owner: Indian Railways
- Operator: Indian Railways
- Line: Pune–Miraj–Londa line
- Platforms: 2
- Tracks: broad gauge

Construction
- Structure type: Standard (on ground)

Other information
- Status: Functioning
- Station code: GPB
- Zone(s): SWR
- Division(s): Hubli

Services
Preceding station	Indian Railways	Following station
Gokak Road towards ?	South Western Railway zone Pune–Miraj–Londa line	Bagewadi towards ?
Location
- Interactive map

Ghataprabha railway station is a railway station located on the Pune–Miraj–Londa railway line operated by the South Western Railway zone under Hubli railway division. It is situated at Ghataprabha in Belagavi district in the Indian state of Karnatak.
