= Ugar Khurd railway station =

Railway station in Karnataka

Ugar Khurd

General information
- Location: Ugar Khurd, Belagavi district, Karnatak; India
- Coordinates: 16.669705°N 74.822126°E
- Elevation: 561 metres (1,841 ft)
- System: Indian Railways station
- Owner: Indian Railways
- Operator: Indian Railways
- Line: Pune–Miraj–Londa line
- Platforms: 2
- Tracks: broad gauge

Construction
- Structure type: Standard (on ground)

Other information
- Status: Functioning
- Station code: UGR
- Zone(s): SWR
- Division(s): Hubli

Services
Preceding station	Indian Railways	Following station
Kudachi towards ?	South Western Railway zone Pune–Miraj–Londa line	Shedbal towards ?
Location
- Interactive map

Ugar Khurd railway station is a railway station located on the Pune–Miraj–Londa railway line operated by the South Western Railway zone under Hubli railway division. It is situated at Ugar Khurd in Belagavi district in the Indian state of Karnatak.
