= Alagawadi, Belagavi =

Alagawadi
- Village
- Country: India
- State: Karnataka
- District: Belgaum

Languages
  - Official: Kannada
- Time zone: UTC+5:30 (IST)

Alagawadi is a village in Raibag of the Belgaum district in the southern state of Karnataka, India.
