= Koligudda =

- Village
- Country: India
- State: Karnataka
- District: Belgaum
- Talukas: Raybag

Languages
  - Official: Kannada
- Time zone: UTC+5:30 (IST)
- Postal code: 591220

Koligudda is a village in the Raybag Taluk of the Belgaum district in Karnataka, India. It is situated 123 kilometers northeast of Belgaum, between the Athani-Gokak road.

The Gram Panchayat of the village has received the state-level Gandhi Grama Puraskar for three times in the five-year period from 2015 to 2019, with awards given in 2015-16, 2016-17, and 2018-19.

== Demographics ==
Year	Population
1951	622
1961	770
1971	1225
1981	1796
2001	3946

According to the census of 2011, there were approximately 768 households in the village. The total population was 4,247, with 2,203 males and 2,044 females. In the age group 0-6, there were 589 people; Of which 307 were boys and 282 were girls.

Kannada is the primary language of the village.

Many people have government jobs, such as the police, teacher, and the army.

== Culture and Society ==
The main attractions of the village are the Anand Ashram and the Sri Kalikadevi temple (Lakkavvayi). The major annual fairs held in the village include the Koligudda Pallaki Utsav, which is held annually at the Anand Ashram during Dasara, and the Kalika Devi Jatra, which takes place during the month of Shravana. The Ayyappa Swamy Maha Utsav is also held annually during the annual pilgrimage to the Ayyappa temple, during which devotees walk barefoot over a bed of hot embers as a form of devotion.

An 18-foot tall black granite statue of Kalika Devi is being constructed on a hill near the Sri Kalikadevi temple, and a tree park has been established nearby.

== Agriculture ==
The area of the village is about 817.33 hectares. Agriculture is the main source of income for most of the villagers. Sugarcane is the primary crop grown in the village, while other important crops include jowar, maize, and wheat. The River Krishna is the main source of water for agricultural purposes.
