= Nandikurali =

- Village
- Location in Karnataka, India Nandikurali (India)
- Coordinates: 16.48°N 74.78°E
- Country: India
- State: Karnataka
- District: Belgaum
- Talukas: Raybag

Population (2011)
  - Total: 9,182

Languages
  - Official: Kannada
- Time zone: UTC+5:30 (IST)

Nandikurali is a village in the southern state of Karnataka, India. It is located in the Raybag taluk of Belgaum district in Karnataka.

== Demographics ==
According to the census of 2011, The village has 1,791 households with a total population of around 9,182.

== Economy ==
The majority of the population are cultivators or agricultural workers. About 80% of the villagers are involved in cultivating sugarcane, but maize, wheat, and onions, are also produced. While most of the villagers are involved in agriculture, some are involved in other professions such as tailoring, carpentry, shoemaking and goldsmithing.

Nandikurali has the highest number of "Jaggery Houses " in Raibag taluk, with more than 60 jaggery houses in the village alone producing jaggery sugar. White, red, and black varieties are produced and exported to Sangli, Belgaum, Hubli, Kolhapur, and Mahalingpur. The best jaggery houses in the village are "Kedaraling Bell Tayarika Ghataka", "Amogh Siddeshwar Bell Tayarika Ghataka" and "Aranya Siddeshawar Bell Tayarika Ghatak".

The village contains two canals, which are supplied with water from lake "Hullyal Keri" originating in Raybag taluk. This lake is filled from the Hidkal Dam through a long canal. Nandikurali receives lake water for 4 months between June and October.

== Education ==
The literacy rate in Nandikurali 63.56%.

There are at least seven educational institutions run by the government and private sector. Among them, govt-run KHPS, Nandikurali with current student enrollment of 402 as of 2019, June is a prominent one. The school celebrated its centenary on 28 August 2018. It was established in the year 1928. With 13 active teaching staff, the govt school has computer labs and smart classes. The school imparts the quality education to the rural children up to class of 7.
