= Handigund =

Handigund Hainagund
- Village
- Location in Karnataka, India Handigund (India)
- Coordinates: 16.48°N 74.78°E
- Country: India
- State: Karnataka
- District: Belgaum
- Talukas: Raybag

Population (2001)
  - Total: 7,382

Languages
  - Official: Kannada
- Time zone: UTC+5:30 (IST)
- PIN: 591235
- Nearest city: Mahalingpur

Handigund is a village in the southern state of Karnataka, India. Its name derives from Hainagund(ಹೈನಗುಂದ), which means "famous for milking". The village is the site of three private primary schools and four high schools and one PU college. It is located in the Raybag taluk of Belgaum district in Karnataka.

== Demographics ==
As of 2001 India census, Handigund had a population of 7382 with 3757 males and 3625 females.

== See also ==
- Belgaum
- Districts of Karnataka
