= Vijaynagar railway station =

Railway station in Maharastra, India

Vijaynagar

General information
- Location: Miraj Road, Vijaynagar, Sangli district, Maharashtra; India
- Coordinates: 16.777812°N 74.69629°E
- Elevation: 564 metres (1,850 ft)
- System: Indian Railways station
- Owner: Indian Railways
- Operator: Indian Railways
- Line: Pune–Miraj–Londa line
- Platforms: 1
- Tracks: broad gauge

Construction
- Structure type: Standard (on ground)

Other information
- Status: Functioning
- Station code: VJR
- Zone(s): SWR
- Division(s): Hubli

Services
Preceding station	Indian Railways	Following station
Shedbal towards ?	South Western Railway zone Pune–Miraj–Londa line	Miraj Junction towards ?
Location
- Interactive map

Vijaynagar railway station is a railway station located on the Pune–Miraj–Londa railway line operated by the South Western Railway zone under Hubli railway division. It is situated beside Miraj Road at Vijaynagar in Sangli district in the Indian state of Maharashtra.
