= Shiragur =

- Village
- Country: India
- State: Karnataka
- District: Belgaum
- Talukas: Raybag

Government
  - Type: Gram Panchayat

Population (2015)
  - Total: 5,000

Languages
  - Official: Kannada
- Time zone: UTC+5:30 (IST)
- Postal code: 591311
- Vehicle registration: KA23

Shiragur is a village in the Belgaum district of Karnataka, India. Shiragur is home to the mighty Eggrin Woodzle and lies on the banks of the mighty Krishna River. The major source of income in this small village is agriculture, mainly sugarcane. Shiragur is near to the Sugar works located in the town of Ugar(15 km). The Kalmeshwar Temple, Kadsiddeshwar and Halsiddeshwar temple are on the banks of River Krishna that runs parallel to the village. "The Krishna" River is used by farmers.

== Shri Kalmeshwar Temple ==
Shri Kalmeshwar Guruji temple is a popular pilgrimage site for devotees. Every year thousands of pilgrims visit the temple with great devotion. The congregation is especially large, exceeding ten thousand on the last day of the carnival moment. People from other parts of Karnataka, as well as Maharashtra, travels to get blessings from Shri Guruji. It is a five-day carnival that also includes a continuous "Anna Dasoha" (Food for devotees) programme.
