= Gokak Road railway station =

Railway station in Karnataka

Gokak Road

General information
- Location: Konnur, Belagavi district, Karnatak; India
- Coordinates: 16.205164°N 74.738839°E
- Elevation: 625 metres (2,051 ft)
- System: Indian Railways station
- Owner: Indian Railways
- Operator: Indian Railways
- Line: Pune–Miraj–Londa line
- Platforms: 2
- Tracks: broad gauge

Construction
- Structure type: Standard (on ground)

Other information
- Status: Functioning
- Station code: GKK
- Zone(s): SWR
- Division(s): Hubli

Services
Preceding station	Indian Railways	Following station
Parkanhatti towards ?	South Western Railway zone Pune–Miraj–Londa line	Ghataprabha towards ?
Location
- Interactive map

Gokak Road railway station is a railway station located on the Pune–Miraj–Londa railway line operated by the South Western Railway zone under Hubli railway division. It is situated at Konnur in Belagavi district in the Indian state of Karnatak.
