= Bekkeri =

- Village
- Location in Karnataka, India Bekkeri (India)
- Coordinates: 16.48°N 74.78°E
- Country: India
- State: Karnataka
- District: Belgaum
- Talukas: Raybag

Population (2001)
  - Total: 5,567

Languages
  - Official: Kannada
- Time zone: UTC+5:30 (IST)

Bekkeri is a village in the southern state of Karnataka, India. It is located in the Raybag taluk of Belagavi district (formerly Belgaum district).

== Demographics ==
As of 2001 India census, Bekkeri had a population of 5,567 with 2,857 males and 2,710 females.

== See also ==
- Belgaum
- Districts of Karnataka
