= Vivekrao Vasanthrao Patil =

Indian politician, educator, author and industrialist

Member of Legislative Council, Karnataka
- Incumbent
- Assumed office 2016
- Preceded by: Veerkumar Appaso Patil (INC)

Chairman, Karnataka Milk Federation, Belgaum
- Incumbent
- Assumed office 2014

Chairman, Mahakali educational charitable society
- Incumbent
- Assumed office 1978

Chairman, Phoenix Public School
- Incumbent
- Assumed office 1988

Personal details
- Born: 16 June 1958 (age 68) Solapur, India
- Party: Independent
- Relations: Pranay Vivek Patil (son); Amarsinh Vasantrao Patil (Brother)
- Parent: V.L. Patil (father)
- Education: St. Peters school, Panchgani

Vivekrao Vasanthrao Patil (born 1958) is an Indian politician, educator, author and industrialist. Born in Solapur, he is the son of V.L. Patil, a politician and freedom fighter. Vivekrao is the Indian politician. He completed his MBA from Chatrapati Shivaji University, Kolhapur.

He is an elected member of the legislative council and was elected independently with a record victory margin that was the highest in the state since independence. He was elected director of the Karnataka Milk Federation and then elected as the chairman. Vivekrao is a member of the Belgaum Chamber of Commerce, a chairman of the Raibag Sugar Factory and a chairman of the Belgaum District Co-operative bank. He is a Political Strongman in the state.

He runs a chain of over 50 educational institutions in Karnataka, Maharashtra and Goa.

He is a writer and among other things has written several novels. One of them, Dawn to Dust, was a best selling romantic tragedy novel in Europe and India. A Bollywood movie (Dhadkan) was based on it.
