= Chinchali, Karnataka =

Village in Karnataka, India

Chinchali
- Village
- Location within Karnataka Location within India
- Coordinates: 16°33′54″N 74°49′03″E
- Country: India
- State: Karnataka
- District: Belagavi
- Taluk: Raybag

Government
  - Type: Gram Panchayat

Area
  - Total: 32.57 km^{2} (12.58 sq mi)
- Elevation: 540 m (1,770 ft)

Population (2011)
  - Total: 18,986
  - Density: 582.9/km^{2} (1,510/sq mi)

Languages
  - Official: Kannada
  - Other: English
- Time zone: UTC+5:30 (IST)
- PIN: 591217
- STD code: 08331
- Vehicle registration: KA-22

Chinchali is a village in Raybag Taluk, Belagavi District, Karnataka, India. It is located near the state boundary with Maharashtra, approximately 84 kilometres north of the district seat Belgaum, and 10 kilometres northeast of the taluk seat Raibag. In the year 2011, the village has a population of 18,986.

== Geography ==
Chinchali is situated on the southeast of the Krishna River. The Karnataka State Highway 73 passes through the village. Its average elevation is 540 metres above the sea level. Chinchli railway station is situated on Pune–Miraj–Londa railway line operated by the South Western Railway zone under Hubli railway division.

== Climate ==
Chinchali has a Tropical Savanna Climate (Aw) under the Köppen Climate Classification. It sees the least rainfall in February, with 0 mm of average precipitation; and the most rainfall in July, with 177 mm of average precipitation.

Climate data for Chinchali
Month	Jan	Feb	Mar	Apr	May	Jun	Jul	Aug	Sep	Oct	Nov	Dec	Year
Mean daily maximum °C (°F)	30.5 (86.9)	33 (91)	36 (97)	37.9 (100.2)	36.6 (97.9)	29.8 (85.6)	27 (81)	26.9 (80.4)	28.2 (82.8)	29.8 (85.6)	30.3 (86.5)	30.1 (86.2)	31.3 (88.4)
Daily mean °C (°F)	23.9 (75.0)	26 (79)	28.7 (83.7)	30.3 (86.5)	29.3 (84.7)	25.5 (77.9)	24 (75)	23.7 (74.7)	24.2 (75.6)	25 (77)	24.8 (76.6)	23.8 (74.8)	25.8 (78.4)
Mean daily minimum °C (°F)	17.2 (63.0)	18.8 (65.8)	21.6 (70.9)	23.3 (73.9)	23.6 (74.5)	22.9 (73.2)	22.2 (72.0)	21.8 (71.2)	21.3 (70.3)	20.8 (69.4)	19.5 (67.1)	17.6 (63.7)	20.9 (69.6)
Average rainfall mm (inches)	2 (0.1)	0 (0)	4 (0.2)	17 (0.7)	42 (1.7)	169 (6.7)	177 (7.0)	143 (5.6)	132 (5.2)	106 (4.2)	32 (1.3)	6 (0.2)	830 (32.9)
Source: Climate-Data.org

== Demographics ==
At the 2011 India census, Chinchali has 3,741 households. Among the total population of 18,986, 9,723 are male and 9,263 are female. The total literacy rate is 57.94%, with 6,325 of the male population and 4,676 of the female population being literate. The census location code of the village is 597359.

== Landmark ==
- Mayakka Temple
