= Duryodhan Aihole =

Indian political activist (born 1957)

Member of Karnataka Legislative Assembly
- Incumbent
- Assumed office 2008
- Preceded by: Bheemappa Sarikar
- Constituency: Raibag

Personal details
- Born: 22 January 1957 (age 68); Nidagundi, Mysore State
- Political party: Bharatiya Janata Party
- Spouse: Sushila
- Children: 2 sons, 5 daughters
- Parent: Mahalingappa Aihole (father)

Duryodhan Mahalingappa Aihole (born 22 January 1957) is a politician from Karnataka. He is a member of the Karnataka Legislative Assembly representing Bharatiya Janata Party from Raibag Assembly constituency.

== Early life and education ==
Aihole is from Raibag, Belgaum district. His father is Mahalingappa Aihole. He studied till 10th standard at Harogeri Vidhyalaya, Harogeri before he discontinued studies.

== Career ==
Aihole won the Raibag Assembly constituency representing Bharatiya Janata Party in the 2013 Karnataka Legislative Assembly election. He was re-elected from the same constituency again in the 2018 Karnataka Legislative Assembly election. He won for a third consecutive time in the 2023 Karnataka Legislative Assembly election from the same Raibag seat.
