= Bagewadi railway station =

Railway station in Karnataka

Bagewadi

General information
- Location: Bagewadi , Belagavi district, Karnatak; India
- Coordinates: 16.307771°N 74.7536°E
- Elevation: 608 metres (1,995 ft)
- System: Indian Railways station
- Owner: Indian Railways
- Operator: Indian Railways
- Line: Pune–Miraj–Londa line
- Platforms: 2
- Tracks: broad gauge

Construction
- Structure type: Standard (on ground)

Other information
- Status: Functioning
- Station code: BGWD
- Zone(s): SWR
- Division(s): Hubli

Services
Preceding station	Indian Railways	Following station
Ghataprabha towards ?	South Western Railway zone Pune–Miraj–Londa line	Chikodi Road towards ?
Location
- Interactive map

Bagewadi railway station is a railway station located on the Pune–Miraj–Londa railway line operated by the South Western Railway zone under Hubli railway division. It is situated at Bagewadi in Belagavi district in the Indian state of Karnatak.
