= Soundatti =

Soundatti Bavan Soundatti
- Village
- Location in Karnataka, India Soundatti (India)
- Coordinates: 16.48°N 74.78°E
- Country: India
- State: Karnataka
- District: Belgaum
- Talukas: Raybag

Population (2001)
  - Total: 8,761

Languages
  - Official: Kannada
- Time zone: UTC+5:30 (IST)
- PIN: 591213
- Telephone code: 08331
- Vehicle registration: KA23
- Nearest city: Ankali

Soundatti is a village in the southern state of Karnataka, India. It is located in the Raybag taluk of Belgaum district in Karnataka.

== Demographics ==
As of 2001 India census, Soundatti had a population of 8761 with 4507 males and 4254 females. It is situated on Krishna river.

== See also ==
- Saundatti
- Belgaum
- Districts of Karnataka
