= Sambra =

- Suburban
- Location in Karnataka, India Sambra (India)
- Coordinates: 15.88°N 74.56°E
- Country: India
- State: Karnataka
- District: Belagavi
- Talukas: Belagavi

Population (2001)
  - Total: 10,755

Languages
  - Official: Kannada
- Time zone: UTC+5:30 (IST)
- 5: 591124

Sambra is a suburb in Belagavi city in the state of Karnataka, India. It is located in Belagavi taluk of Belagavi district in Karnataka. It houses the Belagavi Airport which is a domestic airport serving the city of Belagavi.

== Demographics ==
As of 2017 India census, Sambra had a population of 10755 with 6188 males and 4567 females.

== Indian Air Force Station ==
Indian Air Force has an Airmen Training Centre (non-flying station) at Sambra or Sambre, Belagavi..

== Education ==
Sambra has a Kendriya Vidyalaya (central school) to provide education to the air force personnel's, other defence personnel's and local children.

== See also ==
- Belagavi
- Districts of Karnataka
