= Rustumpur =

Coordinates: 21°42′N 76°17′E

- Village
- Interactive map of Rustumpur
- Country: India
- State: Karnataka
- District: Belgaum
- Talukas: Hukeri

Languages
  - Official: Kannada
- Time zone: UTC+5:30 (IST)
- Postal code: 591237

Rustumpur is a village in Belgaum district of Karnataka, India.
