= Ingali =

Village in Karnataka, India

Ingali desai
- Village
- Location in Karnataka, India Ingali (India)
- Coordinates: 16.42°N 74.58°E
- Country: India
- State: Karnataka
- District: Belgaum
- Talukas: Chikodi

Population (2010)
  - Total: 10,558

Languages
  - Official: Kannada
- Time zone: UTC+5:30 (IST)
- Telephone code: 08338
- Vehicle registration: KA23
- Nearest city: Chikkodi (31 km), Miraj (33 km), Sangli (50 km)
- Lok Sabha constituency: Bangalore

Ingali is a village in the southern state of Karnataka, India. It is located in the Chikodi taluk of Belgaum district in Karnataka.

== Demographics ==
As of 2001 India census, Ingali had a population of 7920 with 4140 males and 3780 females.

== See also ==
- Belgaum
- Districts of Karnataka
