= Suladhal =

- Village
- Country: India
- State: Karnataka
- District: Belagavi

Languages
  - Official: Kannada
- Time zone: UTC+5:30 (IST)

Suladhal is a village in Belagavi district of Karnataka, India.
