= Yadravi =

Coordinates: 15°44′N 75°08′E

- Village
- Interactive map of Yadravi
- Country: India
- State: Karnataka
- District: Belgaum

Languages
  - Official: Kannada
- Time zone: UTC+5:30 (IST)

Yadravi is a village in Belgaum district in the southern state of Karnataka, India.
