= Kudachi =

- Town
- Location in Karnataka, India
- Coordinates: 16°37′37.436″N 74°51′14.423″E
- Country: India
- State: Karnataka
- District: Belagavi

Area
  - Total: 1 km^{2} (0.39 sq mi)
  - Rank: 1
- Elevation: 536 m (1,759 ft)

Population (2011)
  - Total: 23,154
  - Density: 4,963/km^{2} (12,850/sq mi)

Languages
  - Official: Kannada
- Time zone: UTC+5:30 (IST)
- PIN: 591 311
- Telephone code: 08331
- ISO 3166 code: IN-KA
- Vehicle registration: KA 23
- Website: karnataka.gov.in

Kudachi is a municipal town in Belagavi district in Karnataka.

"Akhni," widely known as Yakhni Pulao, is a famous local dish.

== Demographics ==
As of 2011 India census, Kudachi had a population of 23,154. Males constitute 52% of the population and females 48%. Kudachi has an average literacy rate of 68%, lower than the national average of 74.9%: male literacy is 60%, and female literacy is 46%. In Kudachi, 16% of the population is under 6 years of age.

Religions in Kudachi
Religion	Percent
Hindus	27%
Muslims	69.5%
Jainism	3.12%
Others†	0.1%
Distribution of religions †Includes Sikhs (0.1%), Buddhists (<0.1%).

The major source of income in this small town is agriculture, mainly sugar cane. Kudachi is near to the sugar works located in the town of Ugar (9 km).

== Land of Sufi Saints ==
Shrine of Hazrat Maasaheba Ashrafe Dojahan R.A., Kudachi (Kudchi), Karnataka – India

Kudachi is often referred to as the land of Sufi saints, as this town has been blessed by the presence of many revered saints throughout history.

Shaikh Sirajuddin Junaidi Rahmatullah Alaih, to whom the town of Kudachi was granted as an Inam (land grant) in the year 1370 A.D., is one of the most prominent among them. In his honor, an annual festival called 'Gadda' is celebrated for at least a week.

Hazrat Maasaheba Ashrafe Dojahan Rahmatullah Alaih migrated to Kudachi from Balkh, Afghanistan, and eventually made this town his home. His Dargah (shrine) in Kudachi is now a well-known spiritual and tourist destination.

Another Sufi saint, Dada Makhdoom Rahmatullah Alaih, is remembered for his legacy of justice and service to the community. People continue to visit his shrine, seeking blessings and justice.

== Economy ==
Kudachi is a town located on the banks of river Krishna River, agriculture is the predominant occupation and is a single largest contributor to Kudachi's economy. The main crops grown are sugarcane, maize, jowar, wheat, pulses and Kudachi brinjal.

== Travel ==
It is 105 km from Belgaum, the district headquarters. It can also be accessed from Miraj, which is 37 km from Kudachi. One can reach Kudachi from anywhere in India by rail and road. Kudachi railway station is the nearest railway connection. The nearest airport to Kudachi is Belgaum and Kolhapur.
