= Raibag (village) =

- Town
- Location in Karnataka, India Raibag (India)
- Coordinates: 16.48°N 74.78°E
- Country: India
- State: Karnataka
- District: Belagavi
- Talukas: Raybag

Population (2011)
  - Total: 10,732

Languages
  - Official: Kannada
- Time zone: UTC+5:30 (IST)
- Postal code: 591317

Raibag is a large village in the southern Indian state of Karnataka. It is located in Raybag taluk of Belagavi district.

== Demographics ==
As of 2011 India census, Raybag (Rural) had a population of 10,732, Comprising 5,548 males and 5,184 females.

== History ==
In ancient days Raybag was called Poobaagi, which means hoovina baagi (flowers place). The Ratta dynasty ruled Poobaagi for centuries, it was Ancient Hub of Jainism. Jain Basadi, Somanath temple and Narasimha temple are historical places in the town.

Rajaditya, a Jain mathematician who served as a court mathematician of the Hoysala kingdom, was originally from this village.

== Notables ==
Rajaditya was a mathematician from Poobaagi.

== See also ==
- Belgaum
- Districts of Karnataka
