= Pune–Miraj–Londa line =

Railway line in India

- Belagavi, an important railway station on Pune–Miraj–Londa line

Overview
- Status: Operational
- Owner: Indian Railways
- Locale: Maharashtra, Karnataka
- Termini: Pune; Londa

Service
- Operator(s): Central Railway, South Western Railway
- Depot: Pune

History
- Opened: 1890

Technical
- Line length: 468 km (291 mi)
- Number of tracks: 2/1
- Track gauge: 5 ft 6 in (1,676 mm) broad gauge
- Old gauge: 1,000 mm (3 ft 3 3/8 in) metre gauge
- Electrification: 25 kV 50 Hz AC overhead line
- Operating speed: 100 km/h

The Pune–Miraj–Londa line is an important railway line connecting Pune in Maharashtra and Londa in Karnataka. It covers a distance of 468 kilometres (291 mi) across Maharashtra and Karnataka. Of the total 468 km distance of this line, 280 km stretch falls under the jurisdiction of Central Railways and the remaining 188 km section under South Western Railway.

== History ==
The Southern Maratha Railway (SMR) completed the metre-gauge Vasco–Guntakal railway line along with the branch from Londa to Pune in 1890. The metre gauge Miraj–Kolhapur railway line was opened for traffic on 21 April 1891. The 2 ft 6 in (762 mm) narrow-gauge line from Barsi Road to Pandharpur was extended to Miraj in 1927.

The Pune to Londa main section was converted from 1,000 mm (3 ft 3 3/8 in) to 1,676 mm (5 ft 6 in) 5 ft 6 in (1,676 mm) broad gauge in 1971. Gauge conversion from 2 ft 6 in (762 mm) to 5 ft 6 in (1,676 mm) of the Miraj–Latur track and extension of the new line to Latur Road was taken up in 1992 and completed in stages. The gauge conversion of the last phase of the 375-kilometre (233 mi) long track was completed in 2008.

The Lonand–Phaltan branch line was completed by 2002.

== Electrification ==
The electrification of the Pune–Miraj–Londa line is under progress as of 2022. The branch line Miraj–Kolhapur was electrified in 2019. The Pune–Miraj line was electrified in 2022. Miraj–Londa line electrification is in progress. The branch line Lonand–Phaltan is also being electrified.

The electrification and doubling of the entire line is complete as on 30 Nov 2025.

== Speed limit ==
The main-line and the branch lines are classified as 'Group D' lines, and the speeds are limited to 110 km/h.

== Loco sheds ==
Pune diesel loco shed houses 175+ locos. These include WDM-2, WDM-3A, WDM-3D, WDG-3A, WDP-4D and WDG-4 locos. Pune trip shed houses WAP-4, WAP-5, WAP-7, WCAM-2/2P, WCAM-3 and WCAG-1 locos. Pune has one trip shed for WDS-4 shunters.

== Major stations ==
Major cities in Western Maharashtra such as Pune, Satara, Karad, Sangli and Miraj lie on the Pune–Miraj–Londa line while Kolhapur is connected by a branch line to Miraj. In Karnataka, Belagavi is the major city which lies on the Pune–Miraj–Londa line.
