= Raybag =

Raybag Raibag
- Taluka
- Location in Karnataka, India Raybag (India)
- Coordinates: 16°29′33.532″N 74°46′28.85″E
- Country: India
- State: Karnataka
- District: Belgaum

Government
  - Body: Nagar Palika
- Elevation: 590 m (1,940 ft)

Population (2011)
  - Total: 18,984

Languages
  - Official: Kannada
- Time zone: UTC+5:30 (IST)
- Postal code: 591317
- ISO 3166 code: IN-KA
- Vehicle registration: KA23
- Website: www.raibagtown.mrc.gov.in

Raybag or Rāyabāga is a taluka in Belgaum district in the Indian state of Karnataka. Its name is based on the words "Rai" and "bagh", meaning the king's (Rai's) garden (bagh).

== Geography ==
Raybag is located at 16.48°N 74.78°E. It has an average elevation of 590 metres (1935 feet). Famous for its rich agriculture produce of banana and sugarcane, this place is underdeveloped. Rayabag railway station was built during the British Raj to keep control on this territory which they used for military administrating office.

== Demographics ==
As of 2011 India census, Raybag had a population of 18,984. Males constitute 52% of the population and females 48%. Raybag has an average literacy rate of 68%, higher than the national average of 59.5%: male literacy is 75%, and female literacy is 60%. In Raybag, 14% of the population is under 6 years of age.
